= United States Senate Banking Subcommittee on Securities, Insurance, and Investment =

The Senate Banking Subcommittee on Securities, Insurance, and Investment is one of six subcommittees within the Senate Committee on Banking, Housing, and Urban Affairs.

== Jurisdiction ==
The Subcommittee on Securities, Insurance, and Investment oversees issues related to securities, annuities, and other financial investments. This includes the Securities Exchange Commission, the Securities Investor Protection Corporation (SIPC), and the Commodity Futures Trading Commission. The subcommittee also is responsible for oversight of government-issued securities, financial exchanges and markets, financial derivatives, accounting standards, and insurance.

== Members, 119th Congress ==
Majority	Minority
Mike Rounds, South Dakota, Chair; Mike Crapo, Idaho; John Kennedy, Louisiana; Cynthia Lummis, Wyoming; Katie Britt, Alabama; Jim Banks, Indiana; Kevin Cramer, North Dakota; Bernie Moreno, Ohio	Mark Warner, Virginia, Ranking Member; Jack Reed, Rhode Island; Catherine Cortez Masto, Nevada; Raphael Warnock, Georgia; Andy Kim, New Jersey; Lisa Blunt Rochester, Delaware; Angela Alsobrooks, Maryland
Ex officio
Tim Scott, South Carolina	Elizabeth Warren, Massachusetts

== Historical subcommittee rosters ==
=== 117th Congress ===
Majority	Minority
Bob Menendez, New Jersey, Chair; Jack Reed, Rhode Island; Mark Warner, Virginia; Elizabeth Warren, Massachusetts; Catherine Cortez Masto, Nevada; Tina Smith, Minnesota; Kyrsten Sinema, Arizona; Raphael Warnock, Georgia	Tim Scott, South Carolina, Ranking Member; Richard Shelby, Alabama; Mike Crapo, Idaho; Mike Rounds, South Dakota; Thom Tillis, North Carolina; John N. Kennedy, Louisiana; Cynthia Lummis, Wyoming; Jerry Moran, Kansas
Ex officio
Sherrod Brown, Ohio	Pat Toomey, Pennsylvania

=== 118th Congress ===
Majority	Minority
Bob Menendez, New Jersey, Chair (until August 20, 2024); George Helmy, New Jersey, Chair (from September 9, 2024); Jack Reed, Rhode Island; Jon Tester, Montana; Mark Warner, Virginia; Elizabeth Warren, Massachusetts; Kyrsten Sinema, Arizona (until October 17, 2023); Raphael Warnock, Georgia; Laphonza Butler, California (from October 17, 2023)	Mike Rounds, South Dakota, Ranking Member; Mike Crapo, Idaho; Thom Tillis, North Carolina; John N. Kennedy, Louisiana; Bill Hagerty, Tennessee; JD Vance, Ohio
Ex officio
Sherrod Brown, Ohio	Tim Scott, South Carolina
