= United States Senate Banking Subcommittee on Economic Policy =

The Senate Banking Subcommittee on Economic Policy is one of six subcommittees within the Senate Committee on Banking, Housing, and Urban Affairs.

== Jurisdiction ==
The Subcommittee on Economic Policy oversees economic growth, employment and price stability, federal monetary policy, including the policy functions of the Federal Reserve System; the Council of Economic Advisers; money and credit, including currency, coinage, and notes; control of prices of commodities, rents and services; economic stabilization and defense production; the Defense Production Act; financial aid to commerce and industry; loan guarantees; flood insurance; and disaster assistance carried out by the Federal Emergency Management Agency within the Department of Homeland Security.

== Members, 119th Congress ==
Majority	Minority
John Kennedy, Louisiana, Chair; Mike Rounds, South Dakota; Thom Tillis, North Carolina; Pete Ricketts, Nebraska; Jim Banks, Indiana	Raphael Warnock, Georgia, Ranking Member; Jack Reed, Rhode Island; Tina Smith, Minnesota; Lisa Blunt Rochester, Delaware
Ex officio
Tim Scott, South Carolina	Elizabeth Warren, Massachusetts

== Historical subcommittee rosters ==
=== 117th Congress ===
Majority	Minority
Elizabeth Warren, Massachusetts, Chair; Jack Reed, Rhode Island; Chris Van Hollen, Maryland; Tina Smith, Minnesota; Jon Ossoff, Georgia	John Kennedy, Louisiana, Ranking Member; Tim Scott, South Carolina; Thom Tillis, North Carolina; Kevin Cramer, North Dakota; Steve Daines, Montana
Ex officio
Sherrod Brown, Ohio	Pat Toomey, Pennsylvania

=== 118th Congress ===
Majority	Minority
Elizabeth Warren, Massachusetts, Chair; Jack Reed, Rhode Island; Robert Menendez, New Jersey (until August 20, 2024); Chris Van Hollen, Maryland; Tina Smith, Minnesota; John Fetterman, Pennsylvania; George Helmy, New Jersey (from September 11, 2024)	John Kennedy, Louisiana, Ranking Member; Mike Rounds, South Dakota; Thom Tillis, North Carolina; Cynthia Lummis, Wyoming; Steve Daines, Montana
Ex officio
Sherrod Brown, Ohio	Tim Scott, South Carolina
