= United States Senate Banking Subcommittee on National Security and International Trade and Finance =

The Senate Banking Subcommittee on National Security and International Trade and Finance is one of six subcommittees within the Senate Committee on Banking, Housing, and Urban Affairs.

== Jurisdiction ==
The Subcommittee on Security and International Trade and Finance oversees export and foreign trade promotion, federal export controls and financing, international economic policy, and international financial and development institutions. International organizations or federal agencies that fall under its jurisdiction are the World Bank, the International Monetary Fund, the U.S. Export-Import Bank, the International Trade Administration, and the Bureau of Industry and Security.

== Members, 119th Congress ==
Majority	Minority
Bill Hagerty, Tennessee, Chair; Pete Ricketts, Nebraska; Jim Banks, Indiana; Dave McCormick, Pennsylvania	Andy Kim, New Jersey, Ranking Member; Chris Van Hollen, Maryland; Catherine Cortez Masto, Nevada
Ex officio
Tim Scott, South Carolina	Elizabeth Warren, Massachusetts

== Historical subcommittee rosters ==
=== 117th Congress ===
Majority	Minority
Mark Warner, Virginia, Chair; Jon Tester, Montana; Kyrsten Sinema, Arizona; Jon Ossoff, Georgia	Bill Hagerty, Tennessee, Ranking Member; Mike Crapo, Idaho; John Kennedy, Louisiana; Steve Daines, Montana
Ex officio
Sherrod Brown, Ohio	Pat Toomey, Pennsylvania

=== 118th Congress ===
Majority	Minority
Mark Warner, Virginia, Chair; Jon Tester, Montana; Chris Van Hollen, Maryland; Catherine Cortez Masto, Nevada; Kyrsten Sinema, Arizona (Note: Kyrsten Sinema is an independent but caucuses with the Democrats.) (until October 17, 2023); Laphonza Butler, California (from October 17, 2023)	Bill Hagerty, Tennessee, Ranking Member; Katie Britt, Alabama; Kevin Cramer, North Dakota; Steve Daines, Montana
Ex officio
Sherrod Brown, Ohio	Tim Scott, South Carolina
