= Protecting America from Chinese Cars Act =

Proposed Act of Congress

United States Congress
- Long title: Protecting America from Chinese Cars Act of 2026
- Territorial extent: United States
- Considered by: United States Senate
- Introduced by: Senators Elissa Slotkin and Haley Stevens (both D-MI)
- Introduced: May 27, 2026
- Status: Not passed

The Protecting America from Chinese Cars Act of 2026 is a proposed Act of Congress proposed by Senators Elissa Slotkin and Haley Stevens that will bar Chinese-made vehicles from entering the United States market.

== Background ==
China is a major exporter of automobiles, including electric vehicles (EVs).

On April 29, 2026, Senators Bernie Moreno and Elissa Slotkin introduced the Connected Vehicle Security Act that were used to ban Chinese-made vehicles, parts, and software.

== Provisions ==
The act includes a ban on Chinese-made vehicles from other countries (such as Mexico or Canada) from entering the United States via roads, targeting vehicles designed or manufactured by Chinese entities, or those with less than 15% of Chinese ownership. The act empowers the U.S. Customs and Border Protection to define and identify prohibited vehicles within 90 days.

== Reactions ==
Supporters argue that modern vehicles are essentially "surveillance packages on wheels" capable of mapping infrastructure, tracking drivers, and creating vulnerabilities for remote manipulation. Lawmakers have cited broader concerns that foreign adversaries could access highly sensitive data or even utilize "kill switches" in connected infrastructure.

== See also ==
- Connected Vehicle Security Act
