= United States Senate Banking Subcommittee on Housing, Transportation, and Community Development =

The Senate Banking Subcommittee on Housing, Transportation, and Community Development is one of six subcommittees within the Senate Committee on Banking, Housing, and Urban Affairs.

== Jurisdiction ==
The Subcommittee on Housing, Transportation, and Community Development is the primary oversight committee for the U.S. Department of Housing and Urban Development (HUD). The subcommittee oversees urban mass transit systems and general urban affairs and development issues, HUD community development programs; the Federal Housing Administration; the Rural Housing Service; and Fannie Mae and Freddie Mac, federal corporations that help Americans with the costs of homeownership. The subcommittee also oversees all issues related to public and private housing, senior housing, nursing home construction, and Indian housing issues.

== Members, 119th Congress ==
Majority	Minority
Katie Britt, Alabama, Chair; Mike Crapo, Idaho; Mike Rounds, South Dakota; Kevin Cramer, North Dakota; Bernie Moreno, Ohio; Dave McCormick, Pennsylvania	Tina Smith, Minnesota, Ranking Member; Chris Van Hollen, Maryland; Ruben Gallego, Arizona; Lisa Blunt Rochester, Delaware; Angela Alsobrooks, Maryland
Ex officio
Tim Scott, South Carolina	Elizabeth Warren, Massachusetts

== Historical subcommittee rosters ==
=== 117th Congress ===
Majority	Minority
Tina Smith, Minnesota, Chair; Jack Reed, Rhode Island; Bob Menendez, New Jersey; Jon Tester, Montana; Catherine Cortez Masto, Nevada; Chris Van Hollen, Maryland; Jon Ossoff, Georgia; Raphael Warnock, Georgia	Mike Rounds, South Dakota Ranking Member; Richard Shelby, Alabama; Mike Crapo, Idaho; Bill Hagerty, Tennessee; Cynthia Lummis, Wyoming; Jerry Moran, Kansas; Kevin Cramer, North Dakota; Steve Daines, Montana
Ex officio
Sherrod Brown, Ohio	Pat Toomey, Pennsylvania

=== 118th Congress ===
Majority	Minority
Tina Smith, Minnesota, Chair; Jack Reed, Rhode Island; Bob Menendez, New Jersey (until August 20, 2024); Jon Tester, Montana; Catherine Cortez Masto, Nevada; Kyrsten Sinema, Arizona (until October 17, 2023); Raphael Warnock, Georgia; John Fetterman, Pennsylvania; Laphonza Butler, California (from October 17, 2023); George Helmy, New Jersey (from September 11, 2024)	Cynthia Lummis, Wyoming Ranking Member; Mike Crapo, Idaho; Mike Rounds, South Dakota; John Kennedy, Louisiana; Bill Hagerty, Tennessee; JD Vance, Ohio; Katie Britt, Alabama
Ex officio
Sherrod Brown, Ohio	Tim Scott, South Carolina

== See also ==
- U.S. House Financial Services Subcommittee on Housing and Community Opportunity
