= Connected Vehicle Security Act =

Proposed legislation in the United States

United States Congress
- Long title: Connected Vehicle Security Act of 2026
- Territorial extent: United States
- Considered by: United States Senate
- Introduced by: Senators Bernie Moreno (R-OH) and Elissa Slotkin (D-MI)
- Introduced: April 29, 2026
- Status: Not passed

The Connected Vehicle Security Act of 2026 is a proposed Act of Congress proposed by Senators Bernie Moreno and Elissa Slotkin that would ban automobiles, parts, and software manufactured in or in partnership with China and other adversarial nations from the United States market.

Slotkin justified the bill on national security grounds, noting that Chinese vehicles posed a surveillance risk, and also risked undercutting American automakers.

On July 22, 2026, the Senate Committee on Commerce, Science, and Transportation unanimously approved and advanced the Connected Vehicle Security Act of 2026, to ban internet-connected vehicles and technology linked to foreign adversaries.

On September 3, 2026, the Alliance for Automotive Innovation, which represents major auto manufacturers such as Detroit's Big Three (Ford, General Motors, and Chrysler), sent a letter to congressional leaders asking for a permanent ban on connected vehicles, software, and hardware from foreign adversaries.

== Background ==
China is a major exporter of automobiles, including electric vehicles (EVs).

In January 2025, the US Department of Commerce’s Bureau of Industry and Security issued a rule restricting the import and sale of vehicles, software, and hardware from China and Russia. The BIS determined these presented a national security risk to the US.

On April 28, 2026, over 70 Democratic lawmakers signed a letter to President Donald Trump urging him to ban the import of Chinese-made vehicles in advance of his planned visit to China in May 2026.

== Provisions ==
The act includes the following:

- Ban on Foreign Adversary Vehicles, Hardware, and Software
- Empowers the Department of Commerce "to identify and block high-risk vehicle technologies, components, and transactions that threaten U.S. economic or national security"

== Reaction ==
United Auto Workers President Shawn Fain said "by building on and strengthening the existing connected vehicles rule, this legislation puts common sense guardrails on a major threat to our nation’s auto industry."

General Motors issued a statement in support of the Act, writing that it "supports policies that protect and strengthen American manufacturing and the global competitiveness of U.S. automakers, and we remain committed to long-term investments in our domestic workforce, facilities, and technology."

The Consumer Access to Repair (CAR) Coalition wrote "as government and industry share a commitment to ensuring the automotive supply chain be free of connections to certain countries, this legislation will confirm that takes place."

Oren Cass, chief economist for American Compass said "America needs a hard break from China that restores our economic sovereignty and prevents the Chinese Communist Party from subverting our markets," adding "nowhere is that priority more pressing than the automotive sector. Beijing’s immense subsidies and beggar-thy-neighbor policies are fueling a rapid Chinese takeover around the globe—a threat that, left unchecked, will undermine American industry, trade policy, and national security."

== See also ==
- Protecting America from Chinese Cars Act
