= Andy Kim =

American politician and diplomat (born 1982)

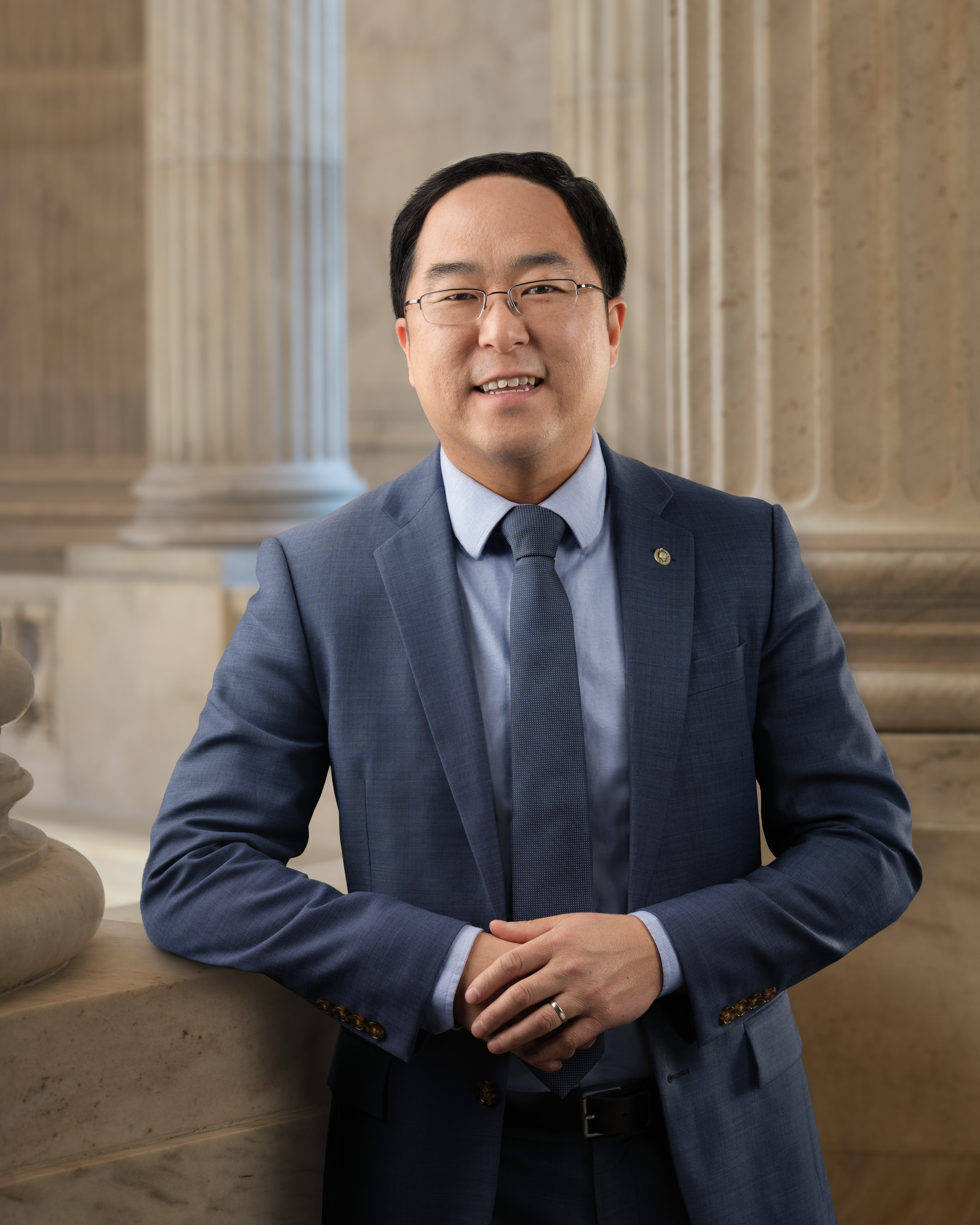
- Official portrait, 2024

United States Senator from New Jersey
- Incumbent
- Assumed office December 8, 2024 Serving with Cory Booker
- Preceded by: George Helmy

Member of the U.S. House of Representatives from New Jersey's 3rd district
- In office January 3, 2019 – December 8, 2024
- Preceded by: Tom MacArthur
- Succeeded by: Herb Conaway

Personal details
- Born: Andrew Kim; July 12, 1982 (age 44) Boston, Massachusetts, U.S.
- Party: Democratic
- Spouse: Kammy Lai (m. 2012)
- Children: 2
- Education: Deep Springs College (AA); University of Chicago (BA); Magdalen College, Oxford (MPhil, DPhil)
- Website: Senate website Campaign website
- Kim's voice Kim speaks on U.S. military safety and readiness. Recorded June 21, 2019

Andrew Kim (born July 12, 1982) is an American politician and former diplomat serving as the junior United States senator from New Jersey since 2024. A progressive Democrat, Kim served from 2019 to 2024 as the U.S. representative from New Jersey's 3rd congressional district.

Kim worked as a civilian advisor at the United States Department of State in Afghanistan during the Obama administration. He was elected to the House of Representatives in 2018, defeating incumbent Tom MacArthur.

With incumbent senator Bob Menendez facing corruption and bribery charges, Kim announced his candidacy for the U.S. Senate in September 2023. He won the Democratic primary after successfully petitioning to abolish "county line" primary ballots in New Jersey. Kim went on to win in the 2024 general election, becoming the first Korean-American in the Senate and the first Asian-American U.S. senator from New Jersey.

== Early life and career ==
Kim was born on July 12, 1982, in Boston, Massachusetts, to South Korean immigrant parents from Miryang, and grew up in South Jersey. His father was a geneticist and his mother was a nurse. Kim grew up in the Marlton section of Evesham Township, New Jersey, and attended Rice Elementary School before moving to Cherry Hill and graduating from Cherry Hill High School East in 2000. After two years at Deep Springs College, he transferred to the University of Chicago, where he graduated Phi Beta Kappa in 2004 with a degree in political science.

During college, Kim was an intern at the United States Agency for International Development and at the Chicago Coalition for the Homeless. He later received a Rhodes Scholarship and a Harry S. Truman Scholarship to study international relations at Magdalen College, Oxford. At Oxford, Kim became friends with fellow Rhodes Scholar Pete Buttigieg, the future U.S. secretary of transportation from 2021 to 2025.

Kim worked at the U.S. State Department. He served in Afghanistan as a civilian adviser to generals David Petraeus and John R. Allen before working as a national security adviser under President Barack Obama. Kim served as a United States National Security Council official. After the Sinjar massacre, Kim wrote the plan implemented by Obama to strike ISIS.

== U.S. House of Representatives ==
=== Elections ===
==== 2018 ====
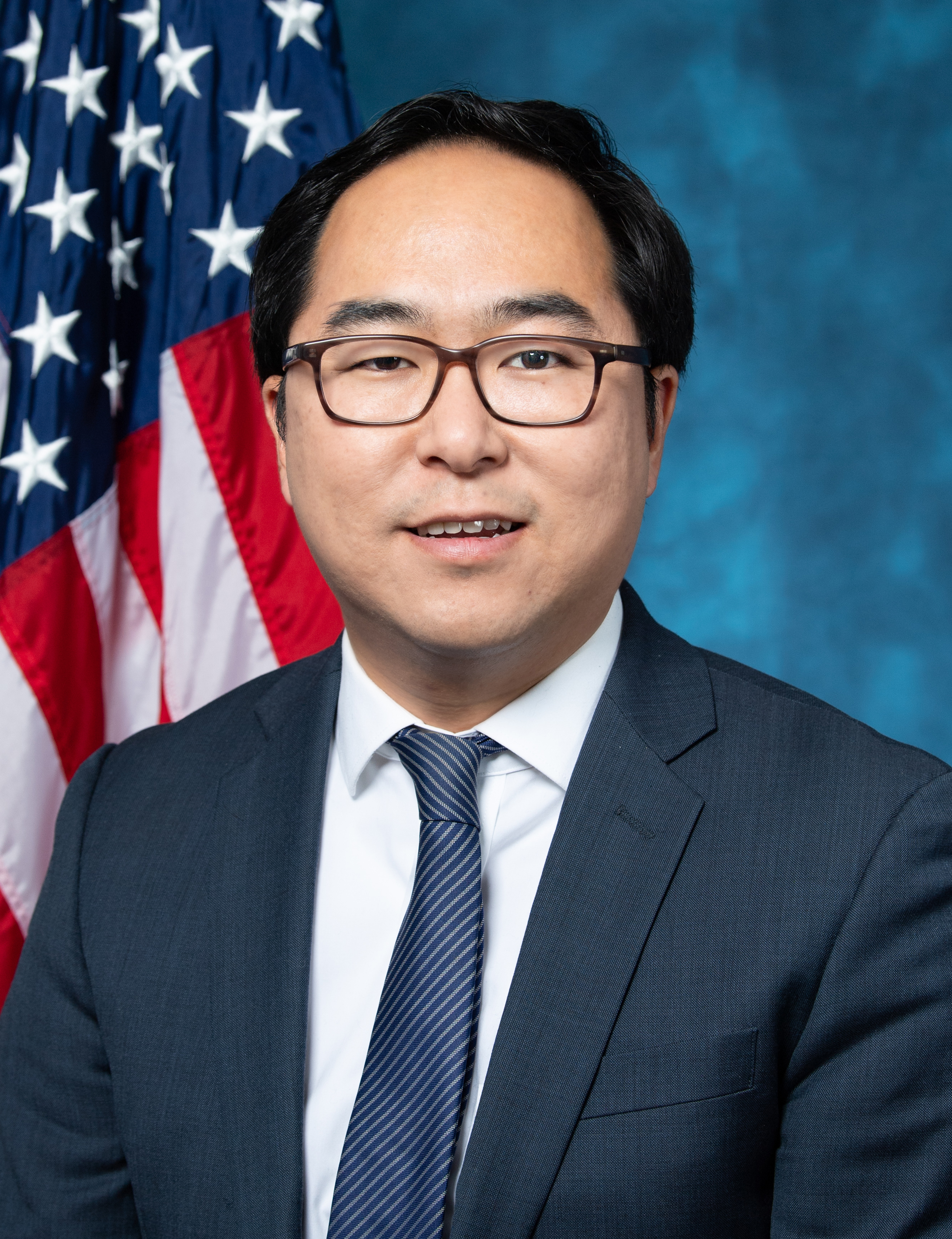
Representative Andy Kim during the 116th Congress

A resident of Bordentown Township, New Jersey, Kim ran against two-term incumbent Republican Tom MacArthur in the 2018 United States House of Representatives election after winning the June Democratic primary.

Kim was endorsed by Barack Obama, former U.S. vice president Joe Biden, New Jersey governor Phil Murphy, and actress Piper Perabo. He said he was inspired to run by MacArthur's efforts to repeal the Affordable Care Act.

During the campaign, MacArthur sought to portray Kim as a D.C. elitist and outsider. In an ad run by the New Jersey Republican Party, Kim was described as "Real Fishy" in Wonton font on a picture of dead fish. The ad was criticized for its racial undertones.

The race was considered too close to call on election night, but the next night, an influx of absentee ballots in Burlington County, home to the majority of the district's voters, gave Kim a 2,500-vote lead, prompting him to declare victory. MacArthur conceded eight days later. With a margin of victory of fewer than 4,000 votes, or slightly over 1% of votes cast, this was New Jersey's closest congressional race. Kim became the first Asian American U.S. representative from New Jersey.

==== 2020 ====
Kim ran for reelection in 2020. In the general election, he faced Republican nominee David Richter, a businessman. Richter originally planned to run against then-Democrat Jeff Van Drew in the second district, but after Van Drew switched parties, Richter decided to run against Kim in the third district. Although the race was projected to be close, Kim won by 53% to 45%, even though the district again voted for Donald Trump.

==== 2022 ====
After redistricting, Kim's district became considerably more Democratic: Joe Biden would have won the reconfigured district by 14.1 percentage points in 2020, and Phil Murphy would have won it by 1.6 percentage points in 2021. Kim won by a margin of 11.8 percentage points (55.4 to 43.6), defeating the Republican nominee, yacht manufacturer Robert Healey Jr.

=== Tenure ===
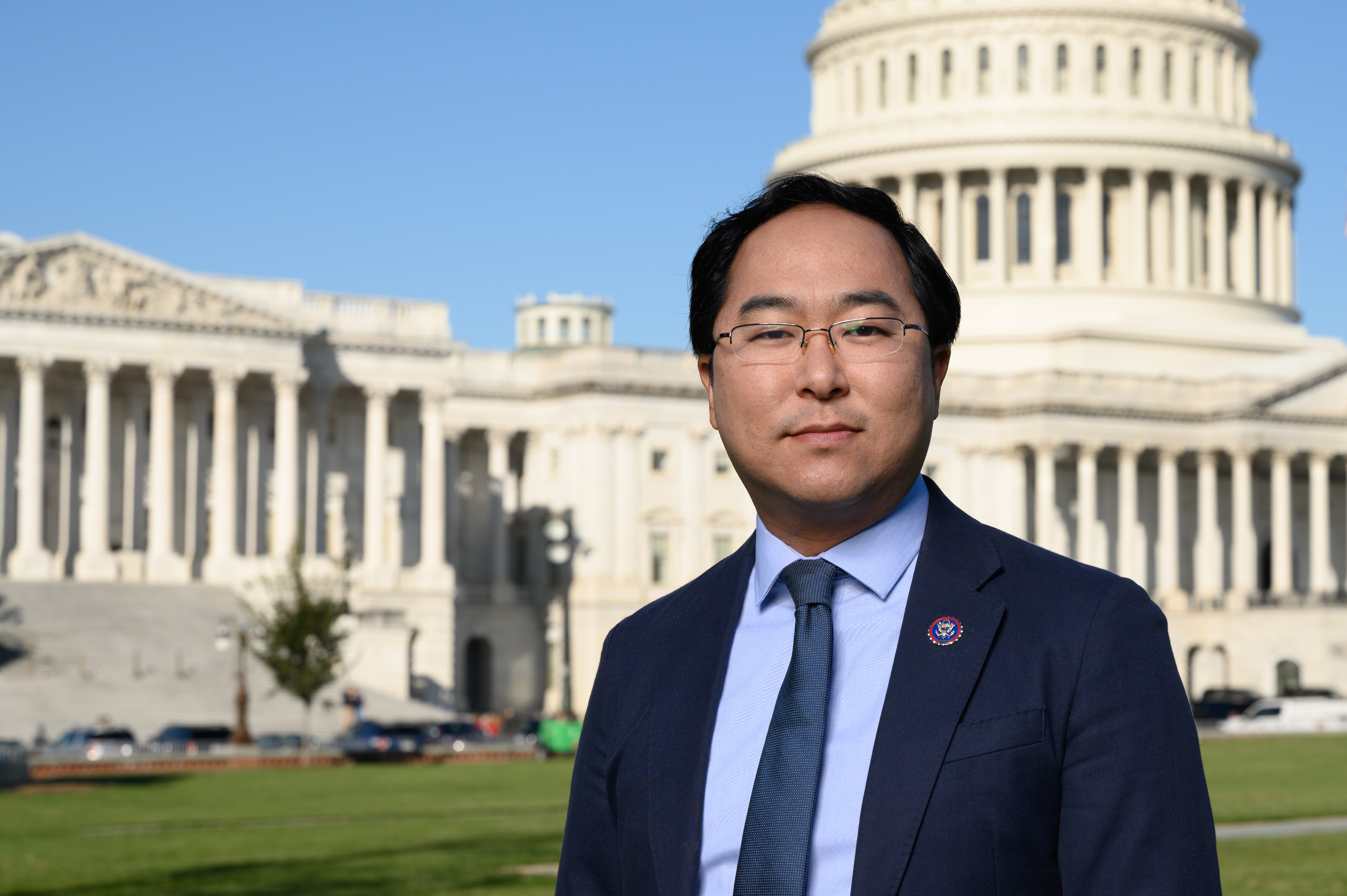
Kim during his second term in 2021

Kim is the first Democratic member of Congress of Korean descent and the second overall after Republican Jay Kim (no relation).

Kim's first official action during his tenure was to vote for Nancy Pelosi as speaker of the House, but he voted against her nomination during a November 2018 Democratic caucus meeting. He cited the need to reopen the government amid the ongoing government shutdown for his decision to back Pelosi.

In February 2019, Kim introduced his first bill, the Strengthening Health Care and Lowering Prescription Drug Costs Act (SAVE Act). In May, the SAVE Act passed the House, 234–183. The bill, designed to lower prescription drug costs, included a provision to prohibit brands from stopping generic versions of drugs from being sold on the market and was not expected to pass the Senate.

In June 2019, Kim co-sponsored an amendment to stop a pay raise for members of Congress.

In April 2020, House leadership appointed Kim to the House Select Subcommittee on the Coronavirus crisis.

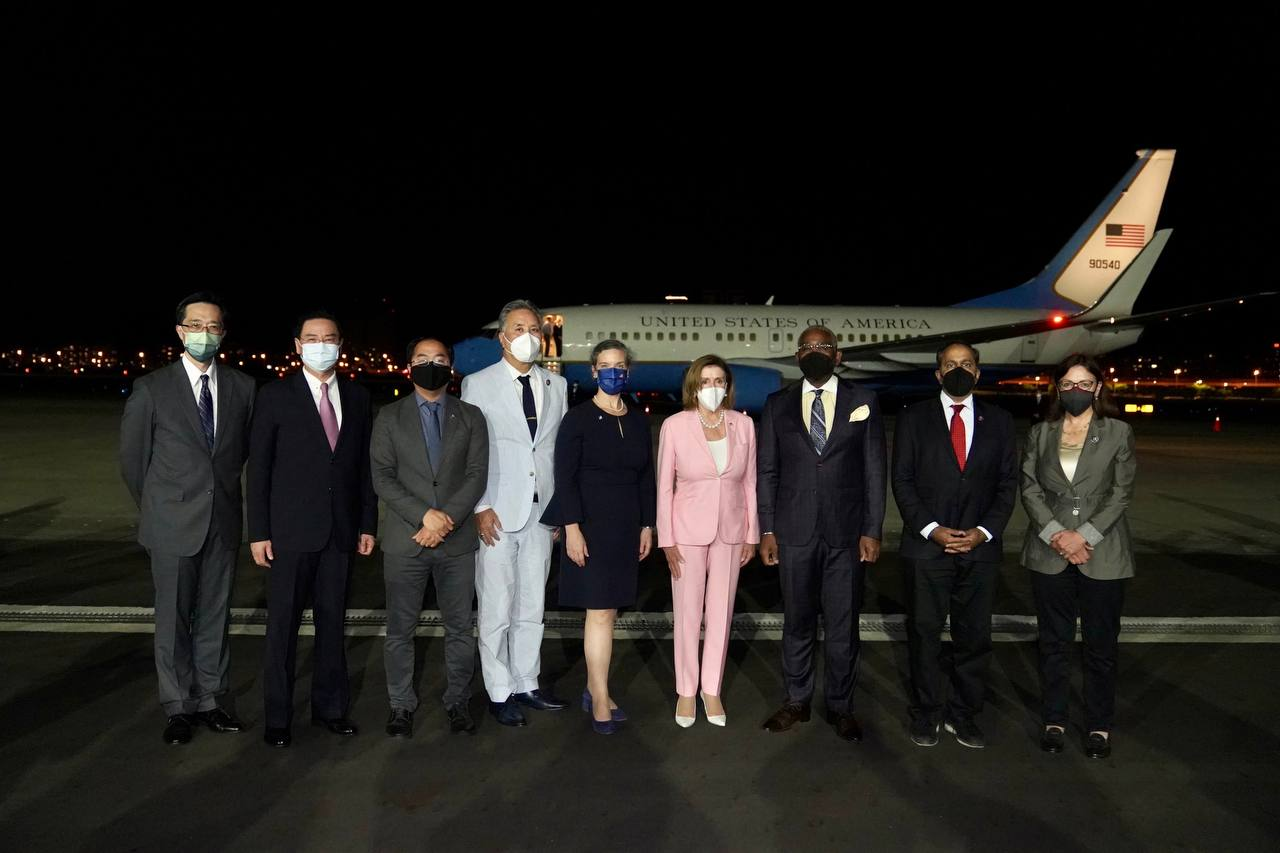
Kim as part of Congressional delegation to Taiwan in August 2022

Kim voted with President Joe Biden's stated position 100% of the time in the 117th Congress, according to a FiveThirtyEight analysis. This results in a Biden Plus/Minus score of +45, indicating significantly higher support for Biden's priorities than would be expected given the makeup of his district. He supported the Inflation Reduction Act, the American Rescue Plan, and the CHIPS and Science Act.

During his tenure, Kim made an effort to host at least one Congressional town hall a month.

In 2021 and 2022, Kim was included on Gold House's annual "A100" list, which honors those of Asian Pacific descent, "who made the greatest impact on culture and society over the past year".

==== 2020 presidential election ====
On January 7, 2021, after voting to certify the 2020 presidential election, Kim gained widespread media attention after he was photographed cleaning up trash left behind after the January 6 United States Capitol attack. He donated the blue suit he wore in the photo to the Smithsonian Institution, which was collecting items from the insurrection.

=== Committee assignments ===
- Committee on Armed Services
  - Subcommittee on Cyber, Information Technologies, and Innovation
  - Subcommittee on Military Personnel
- Committee on Foreign Affairs
  - Subcommittee on Indo-Pacific
  - Subcommittee on Oversight and Accountability
- Select Committee on Strategic Competition between the United States and the Chinese Communist Party

=== Caucus memberships ===
- Congressional Progressive Caucus
- Congressional Asian Pacific American Caucus
- Future Forum
- Congressional Dads Caucus
- Congressional Caucus for the Equal Rights Amendment
- Congressional Ukraine Caucus
- Rare Disease Caucus

== U.S. Senate ==
=== Election ===
==== Primary election ====
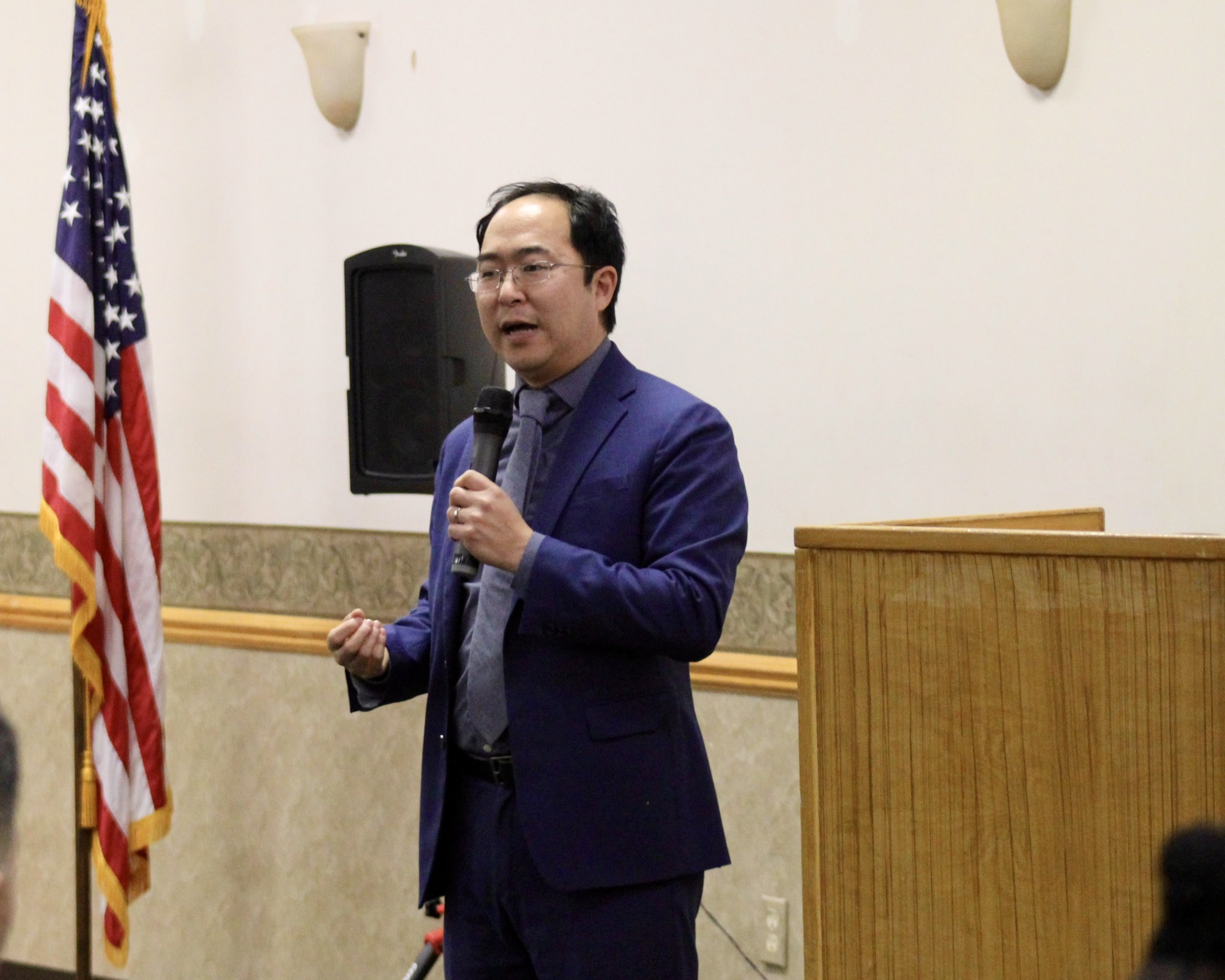
Kim in February 2024

On September 23, 2023, Kim announced that he would mount a primary challenge to incumbent Democratic senator Bob Menendez in the 2024 Senate election, the day after Menendez was indicted on federal corruption charges. Kim was the first major Democrat to challenge Menendez, and did not first notify any state or county Democratic party officials. He said he felt disappointed by the corruption charges, and that he sought to restore integrity in politics. Kim was soon challenged by New Jersey first lady and former Goldman Sachs analyst Tammy Murphy, the wife of incumbent governor Phil Murphy. Her candidacy was accused of being nepotistic, with some papers calling Kim an "underdog" and "insurgent" taking on the "New Jersey political machine". On November 14, 2023, he released his first campaign ad, which showed him having an unscripted conversation with voters.

Early in the race, Kim received some endorsements, most notably from Senator John Fetterman of Pennsylvania, U.S. representatives such as Brendan Boyle and Grace Meng (of Pennsylvania and New York, respectively), and various local party chapters, mayors, and unions. He was also endorsed by former national security advisor Susan Rice and former New Jersey congressman Tom Malinowski; both had worked with him during his time at the State Department. When Kim was endorsed by the College Democrats of New Jersey, they were reportedly pressured to endorse Murphy instead. Kim criticized these efforts, saying, "We seek fairness in our democracy and must not deviate when it advantages us." He later accused "party elites" of trying to "put their thumb on the scale" in the election. The National Organization for Women (NOW) endorsed Kim over Murphy in late February.

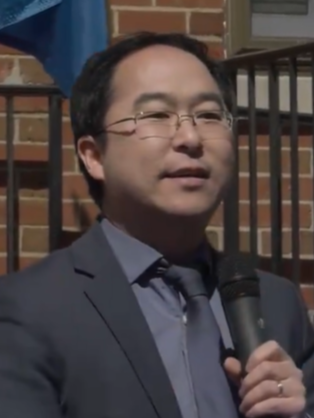
Kim speaking in March 2024

After Murphy declined to participate in what would have been the first primary debate, Kim discussed his candidacy and platform alone with the New Jersey Globe on February 4. The two debated on February 18, in a live-streamed event again hosted by the New Jersey Globe. Polls conducted since October showed Kim maintaining a lead over Murphy with a plurality of support. On February 10, Kim secured New Jersey's Monmouth County Democratic Party nomination, the first in the state, having won the county convention with 265 votes to Murphy's 181. The result was seen as an upset, as it was Murphy's home county, and various county officials had already endorsed her. Kim won the endorsement of his home county of Burlington on February 24 with 90% of the vote. Ultimately, Kim won 17 of the 19 county line endorsements.

On February 26, Kim's legal team sued in the District Court of New Jersey to abolish the "county line" ballot system, joined by opponents Patricia Campos-Medina and Larry Hamm. Kim called the system "unconstitutional" and sought a general redesign of ballots. After Murphy dropped out of the race, Kim said he would continue his efforts against the county line procedure. Politico reported Kim would stand to benefit from the line due to a lack of serious opposition, but the lawsuit proceeded. Federal judge Zahid Quraishi struck down the county line on March 29, and directed clerks to instead print ballots with candidates organized by office in random order for the 2024 primary election. The Third Circuit Court of Appeals declined to block the ruling on April 4, 2024, ahead of a deadline to finalize ballot designs for the primary on April 5.

On March 24, 2024, Murphy announced that she was suspending her campaign. In his statement after Murphy announced she was dropping out, Kim asked supporters to respect her, saying, "we are all a part of something bigger than all of us". Kim was then considered the presumptive nominee, and many predicted an easy victory in the general election. Various news outlets, including The Hill, considered Murphy's withdrawal a victory for Kim against New Jersey "machine politics". The development, along with the Menendez scandal, helped boost Kim's campaign and spurred hope of greater reform.

On June 4, Kim won the Democratic primary with 75% of the vote.

==== General election ====
The same day as the primary, incumbent senator Bob Menendez, who was still on trial for bribery, filed to run for reelection. Although still a registered Democrat, Menendez was set to appear on the ballot as an independent. Curtis Bashaw, a real estate developer and former director of the Casino Reinvestment Development Authority, won the Republican primary on June 7. Upon winning his primary, Kim criticized Menendez for running, and attacked Bashaw for his endorsement of Donald Trump in the presidential election.

By July, Kim had raised more than $9 million for his campaign, with 94% of the donations $100 or less. On July 9, he voiced concerns over President Biden's age and his presidential campaign. When Biden suspended his campaign on July 21, Kim endorsed Vice President Kamala Harris, who eventually became the nominee. He later addressed the Democratic National Convention in August.

Menendez was found guilty on all counts in his corruption trial on July 16, 2024. Kim once again urged Menendez to resign. Both he and Bashaw called the conviction a “sad day for New Jersey". Kim said he would accept an invitation to be appointed to the Senate by Governor Phil Murphy were Menendez to resign or be expelled. On July 23, Menendez announced he would resign from office on August 20. Menendez later requested his name be removed from the ballot on August 16, ending his campaign. On the same day, Murphy announced he would appoint George Helmy, his former chief of staff, to replace Menendez in the Senate. Kim said he supported the appointment and that he would "look forward to working with him in the Capitol". Murphy said that Helmy would step down from the Senate when either Kim or Bashaw was certified as the winner of the election on November 27. Murphy confirmed that he would then appoint the winner of the general election. Helmy was sworn in on September 9. Later that month, Garden State Equality, an LGBT rights group based in New Jersey, endorsed Kim over Bashaw, who is openly gay.

=== Committee assignments ===
- Committee on Banking, Housing, and Urban Affairs
  - Subcommittee on Financial Institutions and Consumer Protection
  - Subcommittee on National Security and International Trade and Finance (ranking member)
  - Subcommittee on Securities, Insurance, and Investment
- Committee on Commerce, Science, and Transportation
  - Subcommittee on Aviation, Space, and Innovation
  - Subcommittee on Telecommunications and Media
  - Subcommittee on Surface Transportation, Freight, Pipelines, and Safety
- Committee on Homeland Security and Governmental Affairs
  - Subcommittee on Border Management, Federal Workforce, and Regulatory Affairs
  - Subcommittee on Disaster Management, District of Columbia, and Census (ranking member)
- Committee on Health, Education, Labor and Pensions
  - Subcommittee on Education and the American Family
  - Subcommittee on Primary Health and Retirement Security

== Political positions ==
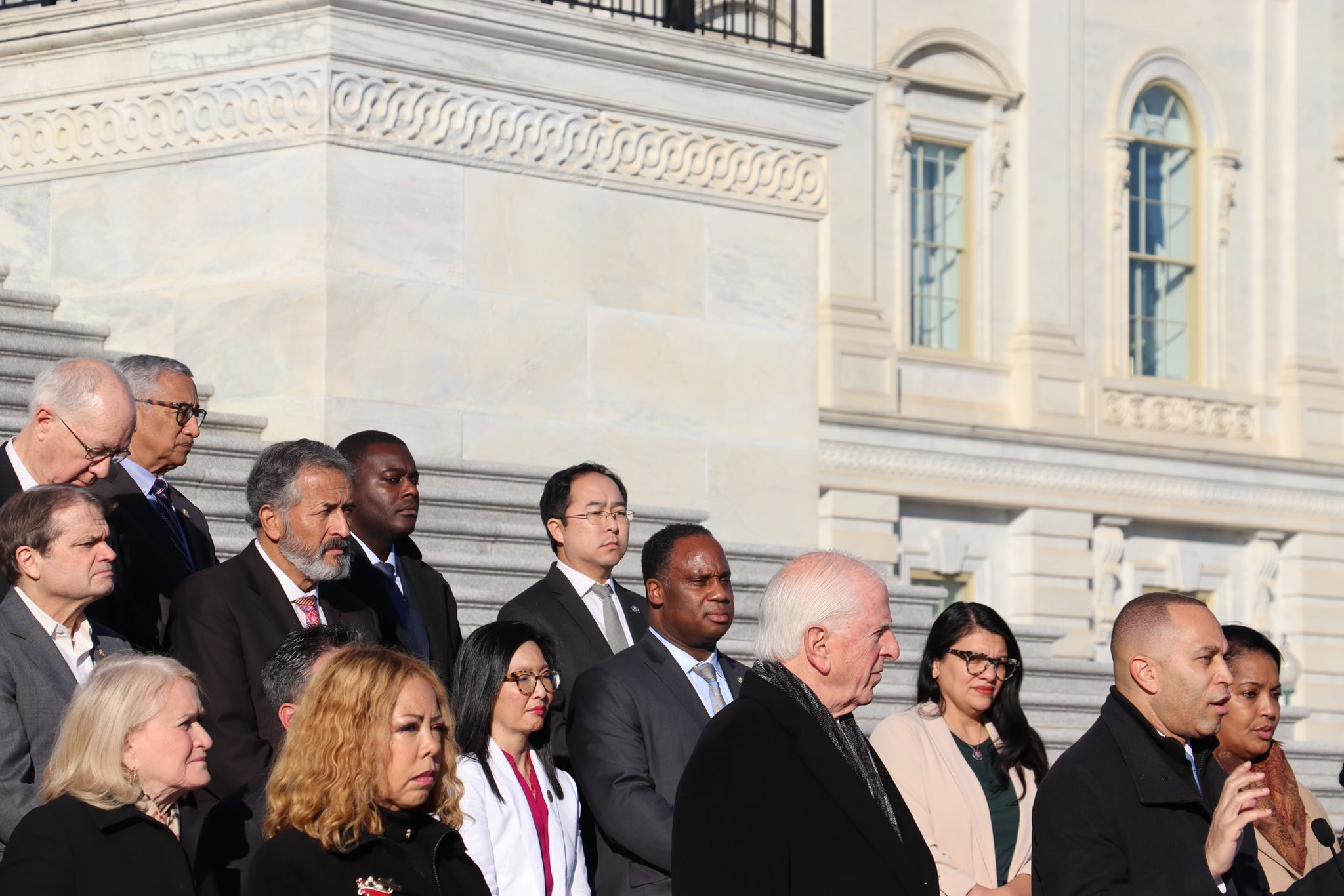
Kim with other House Democrats advocating for gun violence legislation in December 2023

Kim was a member of the Congressional Progressive Caucus during his time in the House of Representatives.

=== Abortion ===
When the Supreme Court overturned Roe v. Wade in 2022, Kim said he was "outraged" by the decision, calling it an "injustice". In 2024, he said he would vote to codify reproductive rights into federal law. Kim has called himself "proudly pro-choice" and said reproductive healthcare is an "essential human right".

=== Campaign finance ===
Kim has said the Supreme Court decision Citizens United v. FEC "significantly damaged democracy" and supports overturning it. He has been endorsed by the End Citizens United political action committee, which ran several ads for Kim's 2024 Senate campaign.

=== Environment ===
Kim supports investing in clean energy and electrifying transit systems. He was endorsed by the League of Conservation Voters and the Sierra Club in the 2024 Senate election. Kim believes climate change is a national security crisis.

=== Filibuster ===
Kim supports ending the filibuster in the United States Senate and has criticized its "weaponization over the past few decades".

=== Foreign policy ===
Kim supports providing aid to the Ukrainian military amid the Russian invasion of Ukraine that has been ongoing since February 2022. He called the death of Russian opposition leader Alexei Navalny a murder. He called the 2023 Camp David Principles between the U.S., Japan, and South Korea "historic".

==== Israel-Palestine conflict ====
In 2024, Kim supported Israel's right to defend itself and advocated for aid to Israel, including funding for the Iron Dome. He expressed his "empathy" for Israelis and Jewish Americans, comparing the threats Israel faces to those South Korea faces from North Korea. In April 2025, Kim voted for a pair of resolutions proposed by Senator Bernie Sanders to cancel the Trump administration's sales of $8.8 billion in bombs and other munitions to Israel. The proposals were defeated, 82 to 15. As of August 2025, Kim has voted four times since he became a senator in December 2024 to block weapons sales from the U.S. to Israel, citing the unprecedented level of "human misery" and "humanitarian catastrophe" in Gaza. He said the investigation of Israel's "horrific" atrocities, "clear" mass starvation, and war crimes in the Gaza war as constituting a genocide is legitimate. But Kim, who studied genocide in graduate school, has not directly called the situation a genocide, saying, "having studied how important of a word that is, I don't feel like I've done my due diligence from an investigatory standpoint".

=== Gun policy ===
Kim supports universal background checks and an assault weapons ban as a way to reduce gun violence, and has an "F" grade from the NRA Political Victory Fund. He was named a Gun Sense Candidate by Moms Demand Action in 2024.

=== Healthcare ===
Kim supports universal health care, and has said that he is open to different options, such as single-payer or multi-payer systems. Kim neither supports nor opposes Medicare for All, a stance he has held since he was first elected to the House in 2018.

=== LGBTQ rights ===
In December 2022, Kim voted for the Respect for Marriage Act, which enshrined interracial and same-sex marriage protections into federal law. He co-sponsored the Equality Act, which would guarantee civil rights protections, amend existing civil rights law to explicitly include sexual orientation and gender identity as protected statuses, and prohibit discrimination on the basis of sex in public spaces. Kim has also attended pride parades across New Jersey.

=== Police ===
In 2020, Kim co-sponsored and voted for the Justice in Policing Act.

In May 2026, Kim attended a demonstration outside Delaney Hall, an immigration detention center in New Jersey where detainees were participating in a hunger and labor strike. He said Immigration and Customs Enforcement (ICE) agents pepper sprayed him while he was trying to deescalate the situation. Kim said: "What I witnessed and experienced today was shameful. Delaney Hall is a failure; it's this administration's failure. The only way to make this right for our communities is to shut it down and make sure the failures we've seen never happen again."

=== Stock trading ===
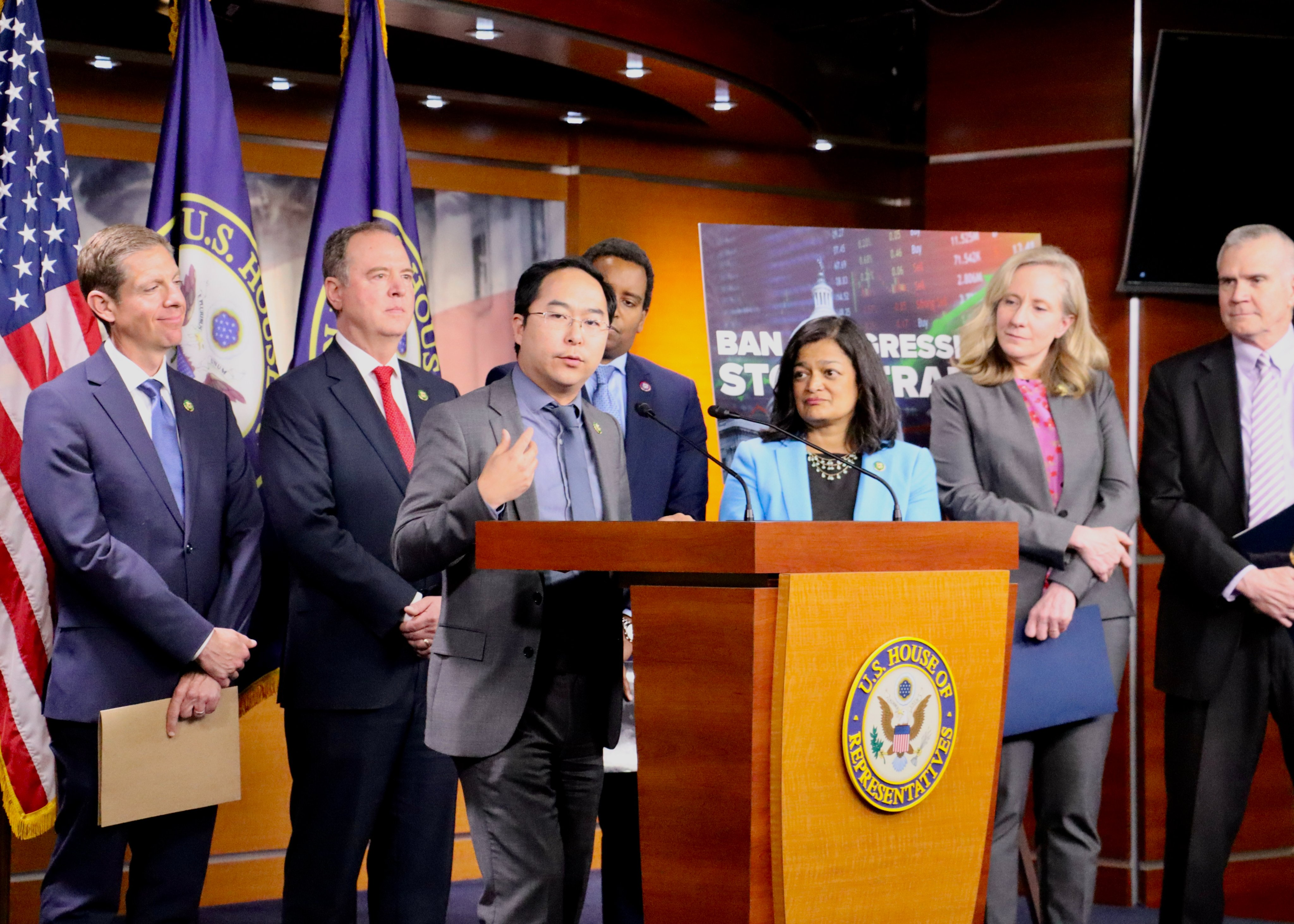
Kim speaking at a press conference supporting a ban on Congressional stock trading in May 2023

Kim supports banning members of Congress from stock trading, saying in December 2021 that he "disagree[d] strongly" with Speaker Nancy Pelosi, who defended the practice.

=== Veterans ===
Kim has voted to raise pay for service members every year through the NDAA, and supports doubling funding for veteran suicide prevention and outreach programs.

=== Immigration ===
On May 22, 2026, in Newark, New Jersey, immigrants detained in Delaney Hall, a private prison run by GEO Group used for holding immigrants detained by Immigration and Customs Enforcement (ICE), held a month-long hunger and labor strike protesting conditions inside the facility. Detainees were allegedly given expired food with worms or mold, sleep on the floor in overcrowded rooms, have been denied medical care for serious conditions, and have reportedly been abused by guards. Protests and civil unrest outside the facility in support of the strikers quickly escalated, resulting in over 90 arrests. Conditions inside the facility worsened, with reports of batons, pepper spray, and tear gas being used against strikers and multiple ambulances arriving at the facility throughout the strike. The strikes ended due to actions taken by guards to intimidate, segregate, and discipline strikers, such as by putting strike leaders in solitary confinement, threatening to force-feed strikers, and transporting strikers to unknown facilities around the country.

On May 25, Kim visited the facility, with fellow House Representatives from New Jersey Rob Menendez and Frank Pallone. Kim and Menendez reported unsanitary bathroom facilities, poor medical care, and abuse by guards. Kim said high schoolers were in the facility, and that taxpayers spend $100,000 per year on each person detained in the facility.

External footage
- Senator Andy Kim pepper sprayed — News 12

During clashes between protesters and ICE agents, ICE agents drove a vehicle toward a crowd of protesters blocking its exit. Kim stood with his hands raised in the air between protesters and the ICE agents in an attempt to deescalate and stop ICE agents from hitting protesters with the vehicle. ICE agents then used pepper spray and pepper balls on the crowd, and Kim was caught in the crossfire. Medics helped Kim recover from pepper spray shortly after. Senate minority leader Chuck Schumer shared a photo of Kim after the incident alongside a photo of Senator Alex Padilla forced to the ground and handcuffed in 2025, writing, "When even U.S. Senators are targeted, every American should understand: no one is safe from ICE's abuses." This post was criticized by Department of Homeland Security (DHS) secretary Markwayne Mullin.

== Personal life ==
Kim married Kammy Lai, a tax attorney, in 2012. They have two sons, born in 2015 and 2017. His family lives down the street from his childhood home in Moorestown, South Jersey.

Kim is a Presbyterian.

One of Kim's passions is making bagels, and he has said that were he not a politician, he would have started his own bagel shop. He taught bagel making classes over Zoom in April 2021 in an effort to raise money for his 2022 reelection campaign.

== Electoral history ==
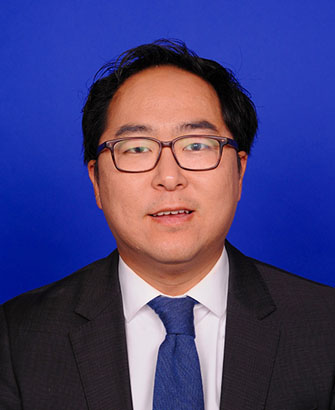
Kim in 2018 before the 116th Congress

2018 Democratic primary results
Party	Candidate	Votes	%
Democratic	Andy Kim	28,514	100
Total votes		28,514	100

New Jersey's 3rd congressional district, 2018
Party	Candidate	Votes	%
Democratic	Andy Kim	153,473	50.0
Republican	Tom MacArthur (incumbent)	149,500	48.7
Constitution	Larry Berlinski	3,902	1.3
Total votes		306,875	100.0
Democratic gain from Republican			

2020 Democratic primary results
Party	Candidate	Votes	%
Democratic	Andy Kim (incumbent)	79,417	100.0

New Jersey's 3rd congressional district, 2020
Party	Candidate	Votes	%
Democratic	Andy Kim (incumbent)	229,840	53.2
Republican	David Richter	196,327	45.5
For the People	Martin Weber	3,724	0.9
Constitution	Robert Shapiro	1,871	0.4
Total votes		431,762	100.0
Democratic hold			

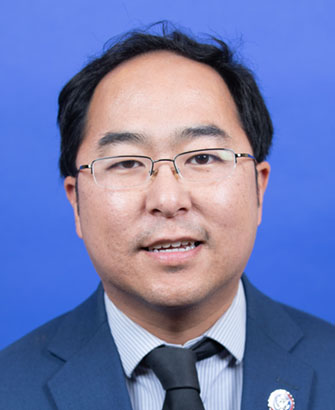
Kim in 2022 during the 117th Congress

2022 Democratic primary results
Party	Candidate	Votes	%
Democratic	Andy Kim (incumbent)	39,433	92.8
Democratic	Reuven Hendler	3,062	7.2
Total votes		42,495	100.0

New Jersey's 3rd congressional district, 2022
Party	Candidate	Votes	%
Democratic	Andy Kim (incumbent)	150,498	55.5
Republican	Bob Healey	118,415	43.6
Libertarian	Christopher Russomanno	1,347	0.5
Independent	Gregory Sobocinski	1,116	0.4
Total votes		271,376	100.0
Democratic hold			

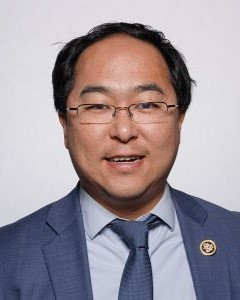
Kim in 2024 before the 119th Congress

2024 Democratic primary results
Party	Candidate	Votes	%
Democratic	Andy Kim	392,602	74.83%
Democratic	Patricia Campos-Medina	84,286	16.06%
Democratic	Lawrence Hamm	47,796	9.11%
Total votes		524,684	100.0%

2024 United States Senate election in New Jersey
Party	Candidate	Votes	%	±%
Democratic	Andy Kim	2,161,491	53.61%	−0.4%
Republican	Curtis Bashaw	1,773,589	43.99%	+1.16%
Green	Christina Khalil	45,443	1.13%	+0.34%
Libertarian	Kenneth Kaplan	24,242	0.60%	−0.07%
Vote Better	Patricia Mooneyham	17,224	0.43%	N/A
Socialist Workers	Joanne Kuniansky	9,806	0.24%	N/A
Total votes		4,031,795	100.0%	N/A
Democratic hold				

== See also ==
- Delaney Hall hunger strike and protests
- List of Asian Americans and Pacific Islands Americans in the United States Congress

U.S. House of Representatives
Preceded by Tom MacArthur	Member of the U.S. House of Representatives from New Jersey's 3rd congressional district 2019–2024	Succeeded by Herb Conaway
Party political offices
Preceded by Bob Menendez	Democratic nominee for U.S. Senator from New Jersey (Class 1); 2024	Most recent
U.S. Senate
Preceded by George Helmy	United States Senator (Class 1) from New Jersey; 2024–present Served alongside: Cory Booker	Incumbent
U.S. order of precedence (ceremonial)
Preceded by Pete Ricketts	Order of precedence of the United States as United States Senator	Succeeded by Adam Schiff
Preceded by Adam Schiff	United States senators by seniority 86th	Succeeded by Ruben Gallego
