= United States Senate Banking Subcommittee on Digital Assets =

The Senate Banking Subcommittee on Digital Assets is one of six subcommittees within the Senate Committee on Banking, Housing, and Urban Affairs. It was created for the 119th Congress.

== Jurisdiction ==
- Digital assets, including but not limited to cryptocurrencies and stablecoins.
- Activities of digital asset issuers, trading and lending platforms, custody providers, and other intermediaries, when such activities are related to digital assets.
- Regulatory activities of the Department of Treasury, the Federal Reserve System, Office of the Comptroller of the Currency, Federal Deposit Insurance Corporation, National Credit Union Administration, Securities and Exchange Commission, to the extent they directly or indirectly exercise supervisory or regulatory authority over digital assets and digital asset intermediaries.
- Financial literacy in digital assets.

== Members, 119th Congress ==
Majority	Minority
Cynthia Lummis, Wyoming, Chair; Thom Tillis, North Carolina; Bill Hagerty, Tennessee; Bernie Moreno, Ohio; Dave McCormick, Pennsylvania	Ruben Gallego, Arizona, Ranking Member; Mark Warner, Virginia; Chris Van Hollen, Maryland; Tina Smith, Minnesota
Ex officio
Tim Scott, South Carolina	Elizabeth Warren, Massachusetts
