= United States Senate Banking Subcommittee on Financial Institutions and Consumer Protection =

The Senate Banking Subcommittee on Financial Institutions and Consumer Protection is one of six subcommittees within the Senate Committee on Banking, Housing, and Urban Affairs.

== Jurisdiction ==
The Subcommittee on Financial Institutions oversees banks, savings associations, credit unions and other financial institutions, including deposit insurance, and e-commerce. It also oversees the Federal Home Loan Bank System, regulatory activities of the Federal Reserve System, the Office of the Comptroller of the Currency and the Office of Thrift Supervision within the Treasury Department, the Federal Deposit Insurance Corporation (FDIC), and the National Credit Union Administration.

== Members, 119th Congress ==
Majority	Minority
Thom Tillis, North Carolina, Chair; Mike Crapo, Idaho; John Kennedy, Louisiana; Bill Hagerty, Tennessee; Cynthia Lummis, Wyoming; Katie Britt, Alabama; Pete Ricketts, Nebraska; Kevin Cramer, North Dakota	Catherine Cortez Masto, Nevada, Ranking Member; Jack Reed, Rhode Island; Mark Warner, Virginia; Raphael Warnock, Georgia; Andy Kim, New Jersey; Ruben Gallego, Arizona; Angela Alsobrooks, Maryland
Ex officio
Tim Scott, South Carolina	Elizabeth Warren, Massachusetts

== Historical subcommittee rosters ==
=== 117th Congress ===
Majority	Minority
Raphael Warnock, Georgia, Chair; Bob Menendez, New Jersey; Jon Tester, Montana; Mark Warner, Virginia; Elizabeth Warren, Massachusetts; Catherine Cortez Masto, Nevada; Chris Van Hollen, Maryland; Kyrsten Sinema, Arizona	Thom Tillis, North Carolina, Ranking Member; Richard Shelby, Alabama; Tim Scott, South Carolina; Mike Rounds, North Dakota; Bill Hagerty, Tennessee; Cynthia Lummis, Wyoming; Jerry Moran, Kansas; Kevin Cramer, North Dakota
Ex officio
Sherrod Brown, Ohio	Pat Toomey, Pennsylvania

=== 118th Congress ===
Majority	Minority
Raphael Warnock, Georgia, Chair; Mark Warner, Virginia; Elizabeth Warren, Massachusetts; Chris Van Hollen, Maryland; Catherine Cortez Masto, Nevada; Tina Smith, Minnesota; John Fetterman, Pennsylvania	Thom Tillis, North Carolina, Ranking Member; Mike Crapo, Idaho; Cynthia Lummis, Wyoming; JD Vance, Ohio; Katie Britt, Alabama; Kevin Cramer, North Dakota
Ex officio
Sherrod Brown, Ohio	Tim Scott, South Carolina

== See also ==
- U.S. House Financial Services Subcommittee on Financial Institutions and Consumer Credit
