= United States Senate Committee on Banking, Housing, and Urban Affairs =

Standing committee of the United States Senate

Senate Banking, Housing and Urban Affairs Committee
Standing committee
- Active United States Senate; 119th Congress

History
- Formed: 1913
- Formerly known as: Committee on Banking and Currency

Leadership
- Chair: Tim Scott (R); Since January 3, 2025
- Ranking Member: Elizabeth Warren (D); Since January 3, 2025

Structure
- Seats: 24 members
- Political parties: Majority (13): Republican (13); Minority (11): Democratic (11)

Jurisdiction
- Policy areas: Banking, insurance price controls, deposit insurance, monetary policy, financial assistance, currency, coinage, housing, urban development, mass transit

Subcommittees
- Economic Policy; Financial Institutions and Consumer Protection; Housing, Transportation, and Community Development; National Security and International Trade and Finance; Securities, Insurance, and Investment; Digital Assets

Meeting place
- 534 Dirksen Senate Office Building; Washington, D.C.

Website
- www.banking.senate.gov

The United States Senate Committee on Banking, Housing, and Urban Affairs (formerly the Committee on Banking and Currency), also known as the Senate Banking Committee, has jurisdiction over matters related to banks and banking, price controls, deposit insurance, export promotion and controls, federal monetary policy, financial aid to commerce and industry, issuance of redemption of notes, currency and coinage, public and private housing, urban development, mass transit, and government contracts.

The current chair of the committee is Republican Tim Scott of South Carolina, and the ranking member is Democrat Elizabeth Warren of Massachusetts.

== History ==
The committee is one of twenty standing committees in the United States Senate. The committee was formally established as the "Committee on Banking and Currency" in 1913, when Senator Robert L. Owen of Oklahoma sponsored the Federal Reserve Act. Senator Owen served as the committee's inaugural chair.

== Jurisdiction ==
In accordance with Rule XXV of the United States Senate, all proposed legislation, messages, petitions, memorials, and other matters relating to the following subjects are referred to the Senate Banking Committee:

1. Banks, banking, and financial institutions;
2. Control of the prices of commodities, rents, and services;
3. Deposit insurance;
4. Economic stabilization and defense production;
5. Export and foreign trade promotion;
6. Export controls;
7. Federal monetary policy, including the Federal Reserve System;
8. Financial aid to commerce and industry;
9. Issuance and redemption of notes;
10. Money and credit, including currency and coinage;
11. Nursing home construction;
12. Public and private housing (including veterans' housing);
13. Renegotiation of Government contracts; and,
14. Urban development and urban mass transit.

The Senate Banking Committee is also charged to "study and review, on a comprehensive basis, matters relating to international economic policy as it affects United States monetary affairs, credit, and financial institutions; economic growth, urban affairs, and credit, and report thereon from time to time."

== Members, 119th Congress ==
Majority	Minority
Tim Scott, South Carolina, Chair; Mike Crapo, Idaho; Mike Rounds, South Dakota; Thom Tillis, North Carolina; John Kennedy, Louisiana; Bill Hagerty, Tennessee; Cynthia Lummis, Wyoming; Katie Britt, Alabama; Pete Ricketts, Nebraska; Jim Banks, Indiana; Kevin Cramer, North Dakota; Bernie Moreno, Ohio; Dave McCormick, Pennsylvania	Elizabeth Warren, Massachusetts, Ranking Member; Jack Reed, Rhode Island; Mark Warner, Virginia; Chris Van Hollen, Maryland; Catherine Cortez Masto, Nevada; Tina Smith, Minnesota; Raphael Warnock, Georgia; Andy Kim, New Jersey; Ruben Gallego, Arizona; Lisa Blunt Rochester, Delaware; Angela Alsobrooks, Maryland

== Subcommittees ==
Subcommittee	Chair	Ranking Member
Economic Policy	John Kennedy (R-LA)	Raphael Warnock (D-GA)
Financial Institutions and Consumer Protection	Thom Tillis (R-NC)	Catherine Cortez Masto (D-NV)
Housing, Transportation, and Community Development	Katie Britt (R-AL)	Tina Smith (D-MN)
National Security and International Trade and Finance	Bill Hagerty (R-TN)	Andy Kim (D-NJ)
Securities, Insurance, and Investment	Mike Rounds (R-SD)	Mark Warner (D-VA)
Digital Assets	Cynthia Lummis (R-WY)	Ruben Gallego (D-AZ)

== Leadership ==
=== Committee on Banking and Currency, 1913–1970 ===
Chairs
Name	Party	State	Start	End
Robert Owen	Democratic	Oklahoma	1913	1919
George McLean	Republican	Connecticut	1919	1927
Peter Norbeck	Republican	South Dakota	1927	1933
Duncan Fletcher	Democratic	Florida	1933	1936
Robert Wagner	Democratic	New York	1937	1947
Charles Tobey	Republican	New Hampshire	1947	1949
Burnet Maybank	Democratic	South Carolina	1949	1953
Homer Capehart	Republican	Indiana	1953	1955
William Fulbright	Democratic	Arkansas	1955	1959
Willis Robertson	Democratic	Virginia	1959	1966
John Sparkman	Democratic	Alabama	1967	1970

Ranking members
Name	Party	State	Start	End
John Townsend	Republican	Delaware	???	1941
Charles Tobey	Republican	New Hampshire	1941	1947
Robert Wagner	Republican	New York	1947	1949
Charles Tobey	Republican	New Hampshire	1949	1951
Homer Capehart	Republican	Indiana	1951	1953
Burnet Maybank	Democratic	South Carolina	1953	1954
Bill Fulbright	Democratic	Arkansas	1954	1955
Homer Capehart	Republican	Indiana	1955	1963
Wallace Bennett	Republican	Utah	1963	1970

=== Committee on Banking, Housing, and Urban Affairs, 1970–present ===
Chairs
Name	Party	State	Start	End
John Sparkman	Democratic	Alabama	1970	1975
William Proxmire	Democratic	Wisconsin	1975	1981
Jake Garn	Republican	Utah	1981	1987
William Proxmire	Democratic	Wisconsin	1987	1989
Donald Riegle	Democratic	Michigan	1989	1995
Al D'Amato	Republican	New York	1995	1999
Phil Gramm	Republican	Texas	1999	2001
Paul Sarbanes	Democratic	Maryland	2001	
Phil Gramm	Republican	Texas	2001	
Paul Sarbanes	Democratic	Maryland	2001	2003
Richard Shelby	Republican	Alabama	2003	2007
Chris Dodd	Democratic	Connecticut	2007	2011
Tim Johnson	Democratic	South Dakota	2011	2015
Richard Shelby	Republican	Alabama	2015	2017
Mike Crapo	Republican	Idaho	2017	2021
Sherrod Brown	Democratic	Ohio	2021	2025
Tim Scott	Republican	South Carolina	2025	present

Ranking members
Name	Party	State	Start	End
Wallace Bennett	Republican	Utah	1970	1971
John Tower	Republican	Texas	1971	1977
Edward Brooke	Republican	Massachusetts	1977	1979
Jake Garn	Republican	Utah	1979	1981
Pete Williams	Democratic	New Jersey	1981	1982
Donald Riegle	Democratic	Michigan	1982	1983
William Proxmire	Democratic	Wisconsin	1983	1987
Jake Garn	Republican	Utah	1987	1993
Al D'Amato	Republican	New York	1993	1995
Paul Sarbanes	Democratic	Maryland	1995	2001
Phil Gramm	Republican	Texas	2001	2003
Paul Sarbanes	Democratic	Maryland	2003	2007
Richard Shelby	Republican	Alabama	2007	2013
Mike Crapo	Republican	Idaho	2013	2015
Sherrod Brown	Democratic	Ohio	2015	2021
Pat Toomey	Republican	Pennsylvania	2021	2023
Tim Scott	Republican	South Carolina	2023	2025
Elizabeth Warren	Democratic	Massachusetts	2025	present

== Historical membership rosters ==
Majority	Minority
Sherrod Brown, Ohio, Chair; Jack Reed, Rhode Island; Bob Menendez, New Jersey (until August 20, 2024); Jon Tester, Montana; Mark Warner, Virginia; Elizabeth Warren, Massachusetts; Chris Van Hollen, Maryland; Catherine Cortez Masto, Nevada; Tina Smith, Minnesota; Kyrsten Sinema, Arizona (until October 17, 2023); Raphael Warnock, Georgia; John Fetterman, Pennsylvania; Laphonza Butler, California (October 17, 2023–December 8, 2024); George Helmy, New Jersey (September 11, 2024–December 8, 2024); Adam Schiff, California (from December 10, 2024); Andy Kim, New Jersey (from December 10, 2024)	Tim Scott, South Carolina, Ranking Member; Mike Crapo, Idaho; Mike Rounds, South Dakota; Thom Tillis, North Carolina; John Kennedy, Louisiana; Bill Hagerty, Tennessee; Cynthia Lummis, Wyoming; JD Vance, Ohio; Katie Britt, Alabama; Kevin Cramer, North Dakota; Steve Daines, Montana

Subcommittees

Subcommittee	Chair	Ranking Member
Economic Policy	Elizabeth Warren (D-MA)	John Kennedy (R-LA)
Financial Institutions and Consumer Protection	Raphael Warnock (D-GA)	Thom Tillis (R-NC)
Housing, Transportation, and Community Development	Tina Smith (D-MN)	Cynthia Lummis (R-WY)
National Security and International Trade and Finance	Mark Warner (D-VA)	Bill Hagerty (R-TN)
Securities, Insurance, and Investment	George Helmy (D-NJ)	Mike Rounds (R-SD)

=== 117th Congress ===
Majority	Minority
Sherrod Brown, Ohio, Chair; Jack Reed, Rhode Island; Bob Menendez, New Jersey; Jon Tester, Montana; Mark Warner, Virginia; Elizabeth Warren, Massachusetts; Chris Van Hollen, Maryland; Catherine Cortez Masto, Nevada; Tina Smith, Minnesota; Kyrsten Sinema, Arizona; Jon Ossoff, Georgia; Raphael Warnock, Georgia	Pat Toomey, Pennsylvania, Ranking Member; Richard Shelby, Alabama; Mike Crapo, Idaho; Tim Scott, South Carolina; Mike Rounds, South Dakota; Thom Tillis, North Carolina; John Kennedy, Louisiana; Bill Hagerty, Tennessee; Cynthia Lummis, Wyoming; Jerry Moran, Kansas; Kevin Cramer, North Dakota; Steve Daines, Montana

Subcommittees

Subcommittee	Chair	Ranking Member
Economic Policy	Elizabeth Warren (D-MA)	John Kennedy (R-LA)
Financial Institutions and Consumer Protection	Raphael Warnock (D-GA)	Thom Tillis (R-NC)
Housing, Transportation, and Community Development	Tina Smith (D-MN)	Mike Rounds (R-SD)
National Security and International Trade and Finance	Mark Warner (D-VA)	Bill Hagerty (R-TN)
Securities, Insurance, and Investment	Bob Menendez (D-NJ)	Tim Scott (R-SC)

=== 116th Congress ===
Majority	Minority
Mike Crapo, Idaho, Chair; Richard Shelby, Alabama; Pat Toomey, Pennsylvania; Tim Scott, South Carolina; Ben Sasse, Nebraska; Tom Cotton, Arkansas; Mike Rounds, South Dakota; Thom Tillis, North Carolina; John Kennedy, Louisiana; Martha McSally, Arizona (until December 2, 2020); Jerry Moran, Kansas; Kevin Cramer, North Dakota	Sherrod Brown, Ohio, Ranking Member; Jack Reed, Rhode Island; Bob Menendez, New Jersey; Jon Tester, Montana; Mark Warner, Virginia; Elizabeth Warren, Massachusetts; Brian Schatz, Hawaii; Chris Van Hollen, Maryland; Catherine Cortez Masto, Nevada; Doug Jones, Alabama; Tina Smith, Minnesota; Kyrsten Sinema, Arizona

Subcommittees

Subcommittee	Chair	Ranking Member
Economic Policy	Tom Cotton (R-AR)	Catherine Cortez Masto (D-NV)
Financial Institutions and Consumer Protection	Tim Scott (R-SC)	Elizabeth Warren (D-MA)
Housing, Transportation, and Community Development	David Perdue (R-GA)	Bob Menendez (D-NJ)
National Security and International Trade and Finance	Ben Sasse (R-NE)	Mark Warner (D-VA)
Securities, Insurance, and Investment	Pat Toomey (R-PA)	Chris Van Hollen (D-MD)

=== 115th Congress ===
Majority	Minority
Mike Crapo, Idaho, Chair; Richard Shelby, Alabama; Bob Corker, Tennessee; Pat Toomey, Pennsylvania; Dean Heller, Nevada; Tim Scott, South Carolina; Ben Sasse, Nebraska; Tom Cotton, Arkansas; Mike Rounds, South Dakota; David Perdue, Georgia; Thom Tillis, North Carolina; John Kennedy, Louisiana	Sherrod Brown, Ohio, Ranking Member; Jack Reed, Rhode Island; Bob Menendez, New Jersey; Jon Tester, Montana; Mark Warner, Virginia; Elizabeth Warren, Massachusetts; Heidi Heitkamp, North Dakota; Joe Donnelly, Indiana; Brian Schatz, Hawaii; Chris Van Hollen, Maryland; Catherine Cortez Masto, Nevada; Doug Jones, Alabama (joined the committee in January 2018, following his election)

Subcommittees

Subcommittee	Chair	Ranking Member
Economic Policy	Tom Cotton (R-AR)	Heidi Heitkamp (D-ND)
Financial Institutions and Consumer Protection	Pat Toomey (R-PA)	Elizabeth Warren (D-MA)
Housing, Transportation, and Community Development	Tim Scott (R-SC)	Bob Menendez (D-NJ)
National Security and International Trade and Finance	Ben Sasse (R-NE)	Joe Donnelly (D-IN)
Securities, Insurance, and Investment	Dean Heller (D-NV)	Mark Warner (D-VA)

=== 114th Congress ===
Majority	Minority
Richard Shelby, Alabama, Chair; Mike Crapo, Idaho; Bob Corker, Tennessee; David Vitter, Louisiana; Pat Toomey, Pennsylvania; Mark Kirk, Illinois; Dean Heller, Nevada; Tim Scott, South Carolina; Ben Sasse, Nebraska; Tom Cotton, Arkansas; Mike Rounds, South Dakota; Jerry Moran, Kansas	Sherrod Brown, Ohio, Ranking Member; Jack Reed, Rhode Island; Chuck Schumer, New York; Bob Menendez, New Jersey; Jon Tester, Montana; Mark Warner, Virginia; Jeff Merkley, Oregon; Elizabeth Warren, Massachusetts; Heidi Heitkamp, North Dakota; Joe Donnelly, Indiana

Subcommittees

Subcommittee	Chair	Ranking Member
Economic Policy	Dean Heller (R-NV)	Elizabeth Warren (D-MA)
Financial Institutions and Consumer Protection	Pat Toomey (R-PA)	Jeff Merkley (D-OR)
Housing, Transportation, and Community Development	Tim Scott (R-SC)	Bob Menendez (D-NJ)
National Security and International Trade and Finance	Mark Kirk (R-IL)	Heidi Heitkamp (D-ND)
Securities, Insurance, and Investment	Mike Crapo (R-ID)	Mark Warner (D-VA)

=== 113th Congress ===
Majority	Minority
Tim Johnson, South Dakota, Chair; Jack Reed, Rhode Island; Chuck Schumer, New York; Bob Menendez, New Jersey; Sherrod Brown, Ohio; Jon Tester, Montana; Mark Warner, Virginia; Jeff Merkley, Oregon; Kay Hagan, North Carolina; Joe Manchin, West Virginia; Elizabeth Warren, Massachusetts; Heidi Heitkamp, North Dakota	Mike Crapo, Idaho, Ranking Member; Richard Shelby, Alabama; Bob Corker, Tennessee; David Vitter, Louisiana; Mike Johanns, Nebraska; Pat Toomey, Pennsylvania; Mark Kirk, Illinois; Jerry Moran, Kansas; Tom Coburn, Oklahoma; Dean Heller, Nevada

Subcommittee	Chair	Ranking Member
Economic Policy	Jeff Merkley (D-OR)	Dean Heller (R-NV)
Financial Institutions and Consumer Protection	Sherrod Brown (D-OH)	Pat Toomey (R-PA)
Housing, Transportation, and Community Development	Bob Menendez (D-NJ)	Jerry Moran (R-KS)
National Security and International Trade and Finance	Mark Warner (D-VA)	Mark Kirk (R-IL)
Securities, Insurance, and Investment	Jon Tester (D-MT)	Mike Johanns (R-NE)

== See also ==
- List of United States Senate committees
- United States House Committee on Financial Services, the congressional counterpart of this committee
- Pecora Commission, the commission established to investigate the causes of the Wall Street Crash of 1929
- Lavelle, Kathryn C. Money and Banks in the American Political System. NY: Cambridge. 97811017609167
