= Bernie Moreno =

American politician and businessman (born 1967)

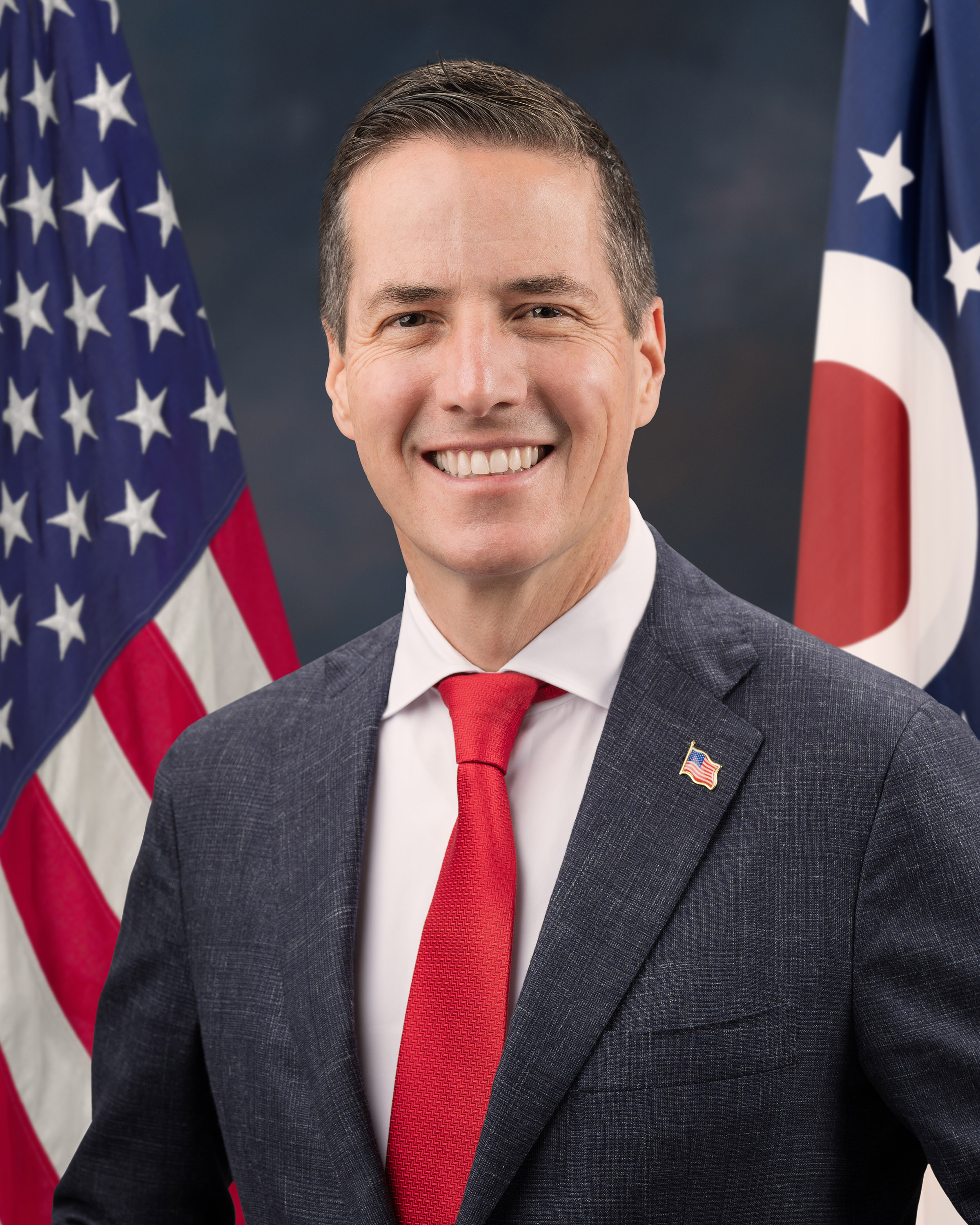
- Official portrait, 2025

Chair-elect of the National Republican Senatorial Committee
- Assuming office January 3, 2027
- Leader: John Thune
- Succeeding: Tim Scott

United States Senator from Ohio
- Incumbent
- Assumed office January 3, 2025 Serving with Jon Husted
- Preceded by: Sherrod Brown

Personal details
- Born: Bernardo Francisco Moreno Mejía; February 14, 1967 (age 59) Bogotá, Colombia
- Citizenship: Colombia (until 1985); United States (since 1985)
- Party: Republican
- Spouse: Bridget Brickley (m. 1989)
- Children: 4
- Relatives: Luis Moreno (brother); Max Miller (ex-son-in-law)
- Education: University of Michigan (BBA)
- Website: Senate website; Campaign website
- Moreno's voice Moreno on the Connected Vehicle Security Act; Recorded September 24, 2026

Bernardo Francisco Moreno Mejía (/məriːnoʊ/ mər-EE-noh; born February 14, 1967) is an American politician and businessman serving since 2025 as the senior United States senator from Ohio. He is a member of the Republican Party.

Moreno was born in Colombia to a family that soon immigrated to the United States, where he grew up in Florida. After graduating from the University of Michigan, he entered business and moved to Ohio in 2005, where he operated car dealerships predominantly in Greater Cleveland before becoming involved in blockchain companies.

Moreno first ran for the U.S. Senate in 2022, but withdrew before the Republican primary. In 2024, he defeated Democratic incumbent Sherrod Brown, becoming Ohio's junior senator on January 3, 2025. A week later, he became the state's senior senator when JD Vance resigned to become vice president. Moreno is the first Hispanic American senator from Ohio and one of the first two Colombian American U.S. senators, alongside Ruben Gallego. After the 2026 elections, he was elected chair of the National Republican Senatorial Committee.

== Early life and education ==
Bernardo Francisco Moreno Mejía was born in Bogotá, Colombia, on February 14, 1967. When Moreno was five, the family moved to Fort Lauderdale, Florida, where he was raised. His father, Bernardo Moreno Mejía Sr., was a physician and surgical assistant who held high-ranking positions in the Colombian government. His mother, Marta Mejía Pradilla, was a real estate agent. Moreno became a U.S. citizen at age 18 and renounced his Colombian citizenship. Moreno's family of nine lived in a three-bedroom condominium in Lauderdale-by-the-Sea for two months before moving to a four-bedroom house in Pompano Beach.

Moreno attended the University of Michigan, graduating with a bachelor's degree in business administration. After it was publicized that his Cleveland Foundation biography incorrectly included a Master of Business Administration degree, his Senate campaign blamed the error on "a staffer who made a mistake".

== Business career ==
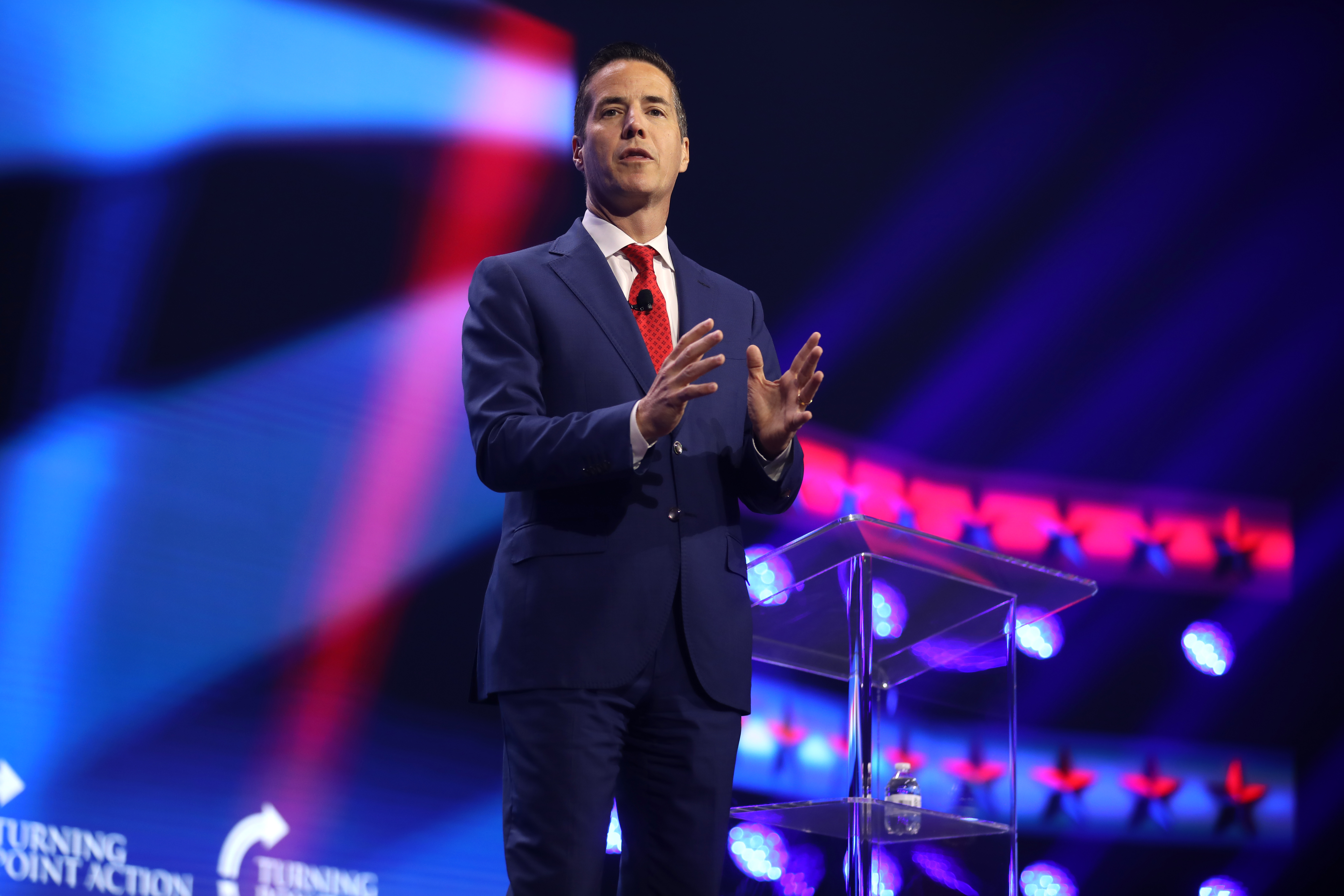
Moreno speaking at the 2023 Turning Point Action Conference in West Palm Beach, Florida

After college, Moreno worked at General Motors as an analyst and field consultant for the Saturn Corporation division. He moved to Massachusetts in the early 1990s to become the general manager of the Saturn dealership at The Herb Chambers Companies.

Moreno relocated to Ohio in 2005 and bought a Mercedes-Benz dealership in North Olmsted, Ohio, near Cleveland. Moreno was the president of the Collection Auto Group, a car dealership company. By 2016, he owned more than a dozen dealerships, mostly located in Ohio. In 2019, he began to sell a number of his dealerships to focus on his new blockchain-based technology company, Ownum.

In 2018, Moreno established the Sales Center for Excellence at Cleveland State University. In 2019, Moreno was elected to the Cleveland Business Hall of Fame in Cleveland Magazine. Moreno was appointed to the board of trustees for the MetroHealth System in October 2019 and served until he resigned in February 2021 to focus on seeking public office.

In 2023, Moreno settled over a dozen wage theft lawsuits before launching his U.S. Senate campaign, agreeing to pay over $400,000 to two former employees. A state judge rebuked him for shredding documents potentially related to the case. A March 2024 report found that Moreno had faced two lawsuits alleging gender and age-based discrimination; Moreno's campaign responded by saying both employees who sued him supported his Senate campaign.

== U.S. Senate (2025–present) ==
=== Elections ===
==== 2022 ====
In April 2021, Moreno entered the race for the Republican nomination for U.S. Senate to replace the retiring incumbent Rob Portman. On February 3, 2022, Moreno dropped out of the race, reportedly after meeting with Donald Trump.

==== 2024 ====
On April 10, 2023, Moreno filed paperwork to run for Ohio's U.S. Senate seat in the 2024 election. Donald Trump endorsed Moreno in December 2023. Moreno won the Republican primary on March 19, 2024, defeating Matt Dolan and Frank LaRose. Moreno defeated incumbent Senator Sherrod Brown in the general election. During the general election campaign, the crypto industry spent more than $40 million in support of Moreno's campaign. Brown was considered adversarial to the crypto industry.

In the run-up to the Republican Senate primary in March 2024, the Associated Press reported that an account on Adult FriendFinder had been created in 2008 using Moreno's email address. The account solicited "men for 1-on-1 sex". The profile listed Moreno's date of birth, and geolocation data indicated that it was set up for use in a part of Fort Lauderdale where property records show Moreno's parents owned a home at the time. In a statement Moreno's lawyer provided to the Associated Press, a former intern said he created the account and called it an "aborted prank".

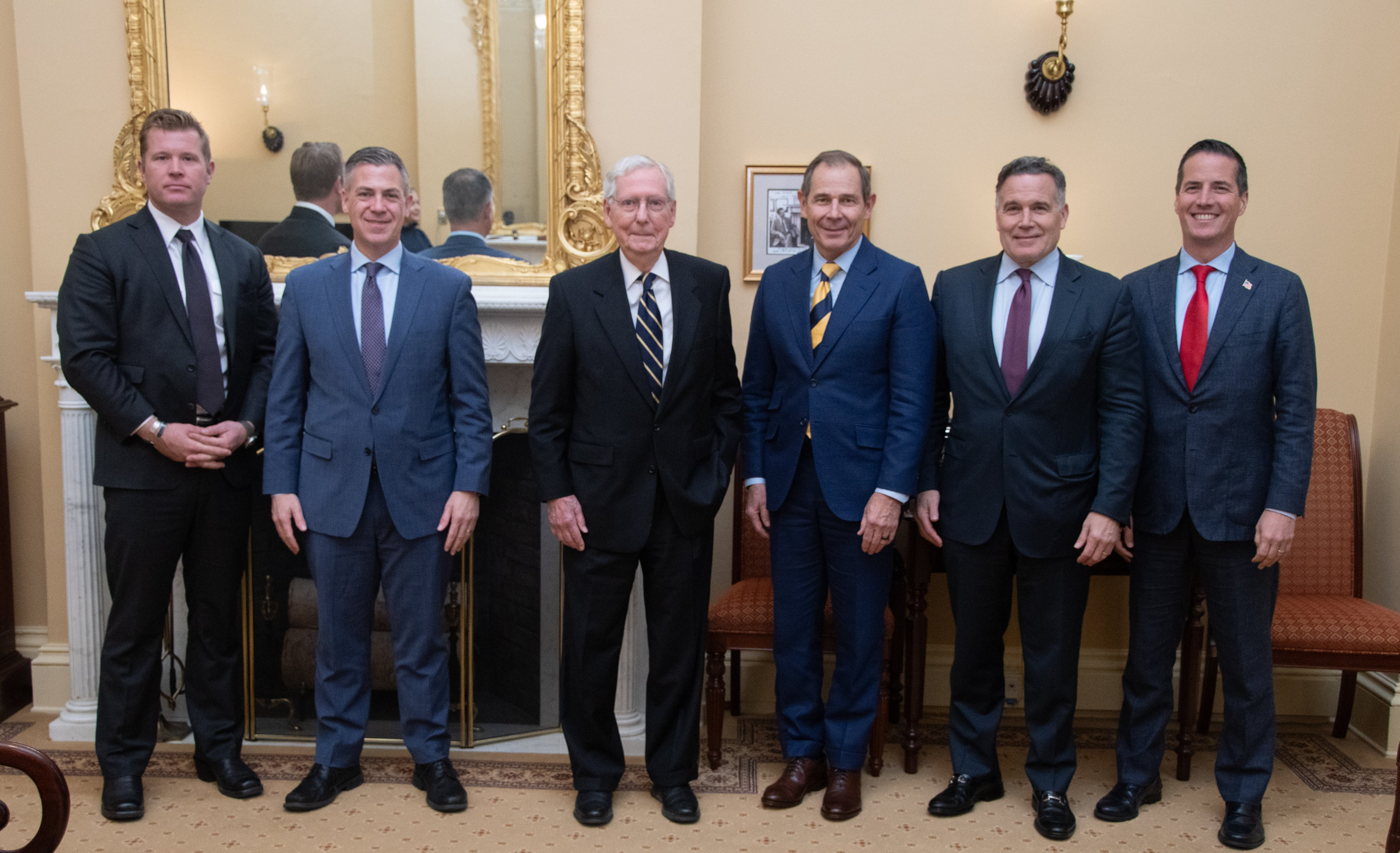
Moreno with fellow incoming Republican senators meeting Senator Mitch McConnell, November 2024

=== Tenure ===
Moreno was sworn in on January 3, 2025, as a junior U.S. senator in the 119th United States Congress. When JD Vance resigned from the Senate on January 10 to prepare to take office as vice president of the United States on January 20, Moreno became Ohio's senior U.S. senator. In April, Moreno negotiated a year-long delay in the closure of the Chillicothe Paper Mill with H.I.G. Capital. On November 10, 2026, he was elected chair of the National Republican Senatorial Committee.

Moreno attended a rally for Republican candidate Mike Rogers in the 2026 United States Senate election in Michigan. At a subsequent rally in Chillicothe, Ohio, Moreno made an Islamophobic comment, implying that Rogers' opponent, Abdul El-Sayed, who is Muslim, was not fit for office because he was not Christian. Moreno called El-Sayed "somebody that just is an affront to me as an American. By the way, an affront to me as a naturalized citizen of this country," and said that "Do you think he understands that concept that our rights come from God almighty? That Jesus came here for our salvation? He should be nowhere near Washington, D.C., and Mike Rogers is gonna kick his ass on Tuesday." The Nexus Project, a nonprofit opposed to antisemitism, criticized Moreno, stating that "If acceptance of Jesus were a litmus test for public service, every non-Christian person would be disqualified."

=== Committee assignments ===
For the 119th Congress:

- Committee on Banking, Housing, and Urban Affairs
  - Subcommittee on Housing, Transportation, and Community Development
  - Subcommittee on Securities, Insurance, and Investment
  - Subcommittee on Digital Assets
- Committee on the Budget
- Committee on Commerce, Science, and Transportation
  - Subcommittee on Telecommunications and Media
  - Subcommittee on Coast Guard, Maritime, and Fisheries
  - Subcommittee on Science, Manufacturing, and Competitiveness
  - Subcommittee on Surface Transportation, Freight, Pipelines, and Safety
- Committee on Homeland Security and Governmental Affairs
  - Permanent Subcommittee on Investigations
  - Subcommittee on Border Management, Federal Workforce, and Regulatory Affairs

== Political positions ==
After the 2020 presidential election, Moreno criticized those denying the results of the election, but in 2021 he said the election had been "stolen".

Moreno has said energy is a top priority, expressing support for using coal, oil, and extracted natural gas, as well as building more nuclear plants. He previously expressed support for background checks for gun owners and in a 2019 interview said "What gun do you need with 100 bullets in it?" When asked about these remarks in 2024, a spokesperson for his campaign said that they "unequivocally" did not reflect his position anymore.

In 2023, Moreno said that reparations should be paid to the descendants of Union soldiers who died in the Civil War (in the context of whether descendants of enslaved Americans should receive them).

=== Abortion ===
Moreno opposes abortion, describing himself in a 2022 interview as "Absolute pro-life. No exceptions." In 2023, Moreno's campaign revealed that he had personally donated $100,000 to Protect Women Ohio Fund, the campaign against Ohio's 2023 abortion-rights referendum. At a March 2024 Republican primary debate, he voiced support for exceptions for rape, incest and when the woman's life is in danger. At that debate, he also expressed support for access to contraception. He later expressed opposition to the Right to Contraception Act and said that he would have voted with U.S. Senate Republicans to block the bill. A spokesman said Moreno "supports comprehensive access to birth control for women but not the far-left gimmicks in this bill". He supports a federal 15-week ban on abortions. In 2025, he voted for legislation banning federal funding of organizations that perform abortions.

=== LGBT rights ===
Before his Senate campaigns, Moreno expressed support for the LGBT community. His business sponsored the hosting of the 2014 Gay Games by Cleveland and Akron. In a 2016 interview, Moreno noted that his eldest son is gay and credited the TV series Modern Family for changing perceptions of same-sex marriage.

According to an Associated Press News profile, Moreno had "shifted from a public supporter of LGBTQ rights to a hardline opponent" by the time of his 2024 Senate run. His campaign social media accounts attacked opponents as supporters of a "radical trans agenda".

=== Immigration ===
On immigration, Moreno has expressed support for a Mexico–U.S. border wall, deploying military personnel on the border, and designating Mexican cartels as Foreign Terrorist Organizations (FTOs). Moreno has also repeatedly called for an end to birthright citizenship. In 2016, he expressed support for a pathway to citizenship for undocumented immigrants, saying "we need to help them come out of the shadows", but now supports deporting them.

In 2025, Moreno introduced the Exclusive Citizenship Act of 2025, which requires that U.S. citizens with dual citizenship renounce their other citizenship. This bill, designated as S.3283 (119th Congress), was referred to the Senate Judiciary Committee on December 1, 2025.

=== Foreign policy ===
Moreno has called for an end to U.S. support for Ukraine in the ongoing Russo-Ukrainian War. He has expressed support for Israel and has said Israel needs to "end Hamas—end it like we ended ISIS." After the 2023 Hamas-led attack on Israel, Moreno argued Israel does not need any additional funding from the United States.

Moreno wrote The Trump Doctrine For Colombia and the Western Hemisphere, a memo calling for sanctions against President of Colombia Gustavo Petro. He presented the memo, headlined with AI-generated images of Petro and Nicolás Maduro in prison uniforms, to Trump in October 2025. He supported the United States abduction of Maduro.

=== Donald Trump ===
In 2016, Moreno called Trump a "lunatic invading" the Republican Party and said he could not support a party led by "that maniac". In a 2016 tweet, Moreno wrote, "He attacked immigrants, tries to silence the press, & appeals to the darkest part of human nature", and asked his followers whether he was describing Trump or Adolf Hitler. He wrote in a tweet that he had written in a vote for Marco Rubio in the 2016 presidential election. During a 2019 radio interview, Moreno said, "there's no scenario in which I would support Trump."

By 2024, Moreno was a Trump supporter, had received his endorsement for Senate, and said, "I wear with honor my endorsement from President Trump."

=== Social Security ===
In June 2026, Moreno and Senator Elizabeth Warren published a joint opinion piece in The New York Times announcing that they had agreed to work together on a proposal to lift or eliminate the Social Security payroll tax cap.

== Personal life ==
In 1989, Moreno married Bridget Brickley. They have four children together and live in Westlake, Ohio. Moreno's daughter Emily was married to Congressman Max Miller. In August 2024, Miller filed for divorce. Emily Miller accused Max Miller of throwing boiling water at her and pointing a gun at her, which he denied. In August 2026, after declining to comment for nearly two years, Moreno publicly called for Miller to resign from Congress, saying he "should not serve in the House of Representatives" and calling him a danger to his daughter.

Moreno's brother, Luis Alberto Moreno, is a former Colombian Ambassador to the United States and a member of the World Economic Forum's board of trustees. He is a cousin of Lina Moreno de Uribe, former first lady of Colombia.

== Electoral history ==
2024 U.S. Senate Republican primary results
Party	Candidate	Votes	%
Republican	Bernie Moreno	557,626	50.48%
Republican	Matt Dolan	363,013	32.86%
Republican	Frank LaRose	184,111	16.67%
Total votes		1,104,750	100.0%

2024 United States Senate election in Ohio
Party	Candidate	Votes	%	±%
Republican	Bernie Moreno	2,857,383	50.09%	+3.51%
Democratic	Sherrod Brown (incumbent)	2,650,949	46.47%	−6.93%
Libertarian	Don Kissick	195,648	3.43%	+3.43%
Write-in		640	0.01%	−0.01%
Total votes		5,704,620	100.00%	
Turnout			69.91%	+15.26
Republican gain from Democratic				

== See also ==
- List of United States senators from Ohio
- List of Hispanic and Latino Americans in the United States Congress

Party political offices
Preceded by Jim Renacci	Republican nominee for U.S. Senator from Ohio (Class 1); 2024	Most recent
U.S. Senate
Preceded by Sherrod Brown	U.S. Senator (Class 1) from Ohio; 2025–present Served alongside: JD Vance, Jon Husted, Sherrod Brown (elect)	Incumbent
U.S. order of precedence (ceremonial)
Preceded by Angela Alsobrooks	Order of precedence of the United States as United States Senator	Succeeded by Jim Banks
Preceded by Dave McCormick	United States senators by seniority 93rd	Succeeded by Angela Alsobrooks
