= Katie Britt =

American politician and attorney (born 1982)

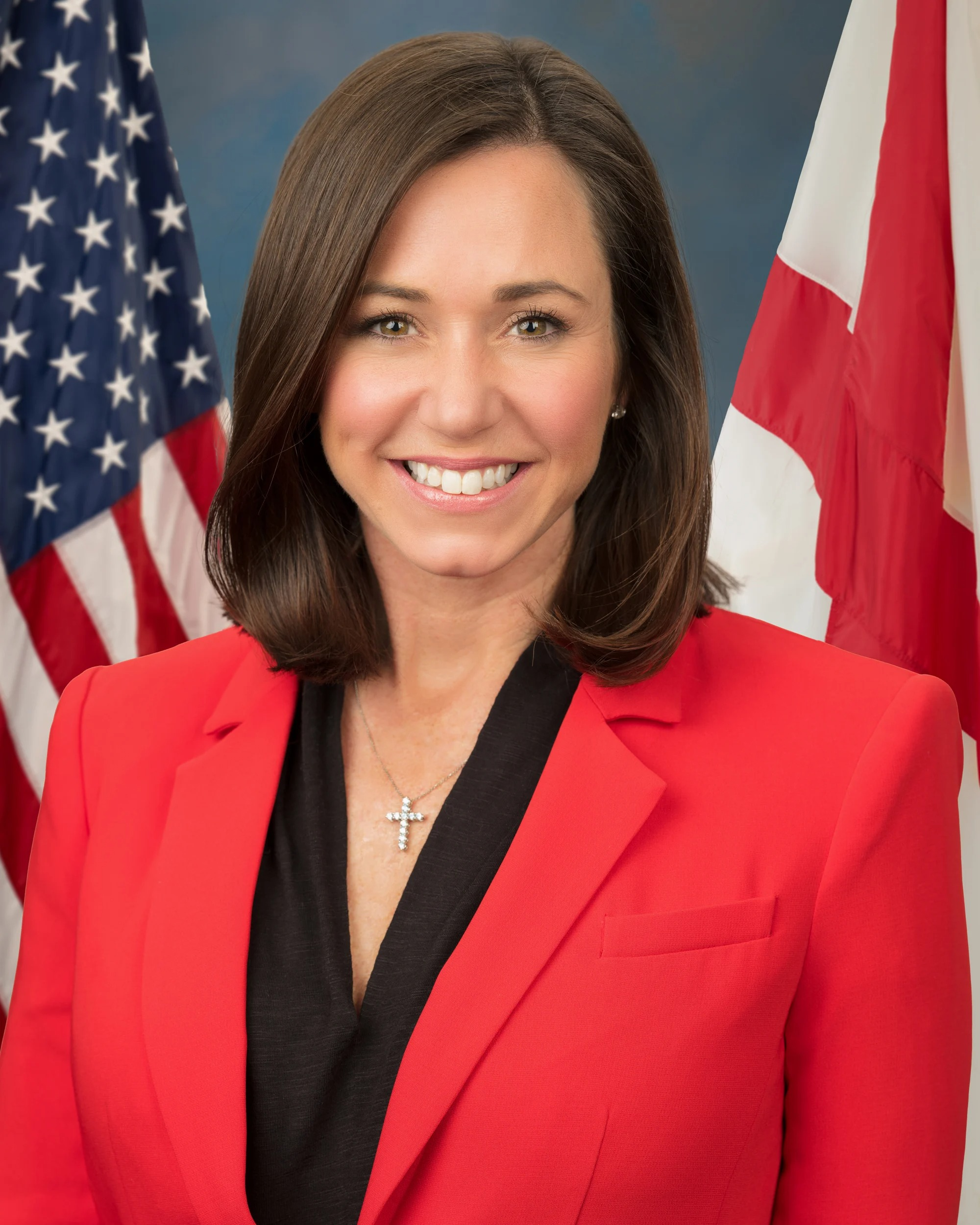
- Official portrait, 2022

United States Senator from Alabama
- Incumbent
- Assumed office January 3, 2023 Serving with Tommy Tuberville
- Preceded by: Richard Shelby

Personal details
- Born: Katie Elizabeth Boyd; February 2, 1982 (age 44) Enterprise, Alabama, U.S.
- Party: Republican
- Spouse: Wesley Britt (m. 2008)
- Children: 2
- Education: University of Alabama (BS, JD)
- Website: Senate website Campaign website
- Britt's voice Britt questioning witnesses on increased crypto regulations. Recorded February 14, 2023

Katie Elizabeth Boyd Britt (née Boyd; born February 2, 1982) is an American politician and attorney serving since 2023 as the junior United States senator from Alabama. A member of the Republican Party, Britt is the first woman to be elected to the U.S. Senate from Alabama and the youngest Republican woman to be elected to the Senate. She was president and CEO of the Business Council of Alabama from 2019 to 2021, and served as chief of staff for the previous incumbent, Richard Shelby, from 2016 to 2018. Britt is expected to become Alabama's senior senator when Tommy Tuberville leaves office in January 2027.

== Early life and education ==
Britt was born Katie Elizabeth Boyd on February 2, 1982, to Julian and Debra Boyd in Enterprise, Alabama. During her youth she worked at her family's business. Her family lived near Fort Rucker in Dale County, Alabama. Her father owned a hardware store and later a boat dealership; her mother owned a dance studio. A graduate of Enterprise High School, Britt was a cheerleader and a valedictorian. After graduating in 2000 she studied political science at the University of Alabama. She was elected president of the university's Student Government Association and graduated in 2004 with a Bachelor of Science. Later she attended the University of Alabama School of Law, graduating in 2013 with a Juris Doctor.

== Law and public affairs career ==
After she graduated from the University of Alabama, Britt joined the staff of U.S. Senator Richard Shelby in May 2004 as deputy press secretary. She was promoted to press secretary there. In 2007, she left Shelby's staff and worked as a special assistant to University of Alabama president Robert Witt. At the University of Alabama School of Law, she participated in Tax Moot Court.

After law school, Britt first worked at Johnston Barton Proctor & Rose LLP in Birmingham. When the firm shut down in March 2014, Britt and 17 former employees joined the Birmingham office of Butler Snow LLP. She started the firm's government affairs branch. In November 2015, Britt took a leave of absence from Butler Snow to return to Shelby's staff, working on his reelection campaign as the deputy campaign manager and communications director.

In 2016, Shelby named Britt his chief of staff, and head of his Judicial Nomination Task Force. In May 2016, Yellowhammer News forecasted Britt as one of "the people who will be running Alabama in a few years".

In December 2018, Britt was selected as president and CEO of the Business Council of Alabama, effective January 2, the first woman to lead the organization. As the head of what Alabama Daily News called one of the state's "most influential political organizations", she focused on workforce and economic development through tax incentives, and addressed the state's prison system and participation in the 2020 United States census. During the COVID-19 pandemic in 2020, she led a "Keep Alabama Open" effort to self-govern business affairs by avoiding shutdowns and maintain employment. In April 2021, she was elected to the Alabama Wildlife Federation's board of directors. Britt resigned from her positions at the Business Council of Alabama in June 2021, amid media speculation that she would run for the U.S. Senate.

== U.S. Senate ==
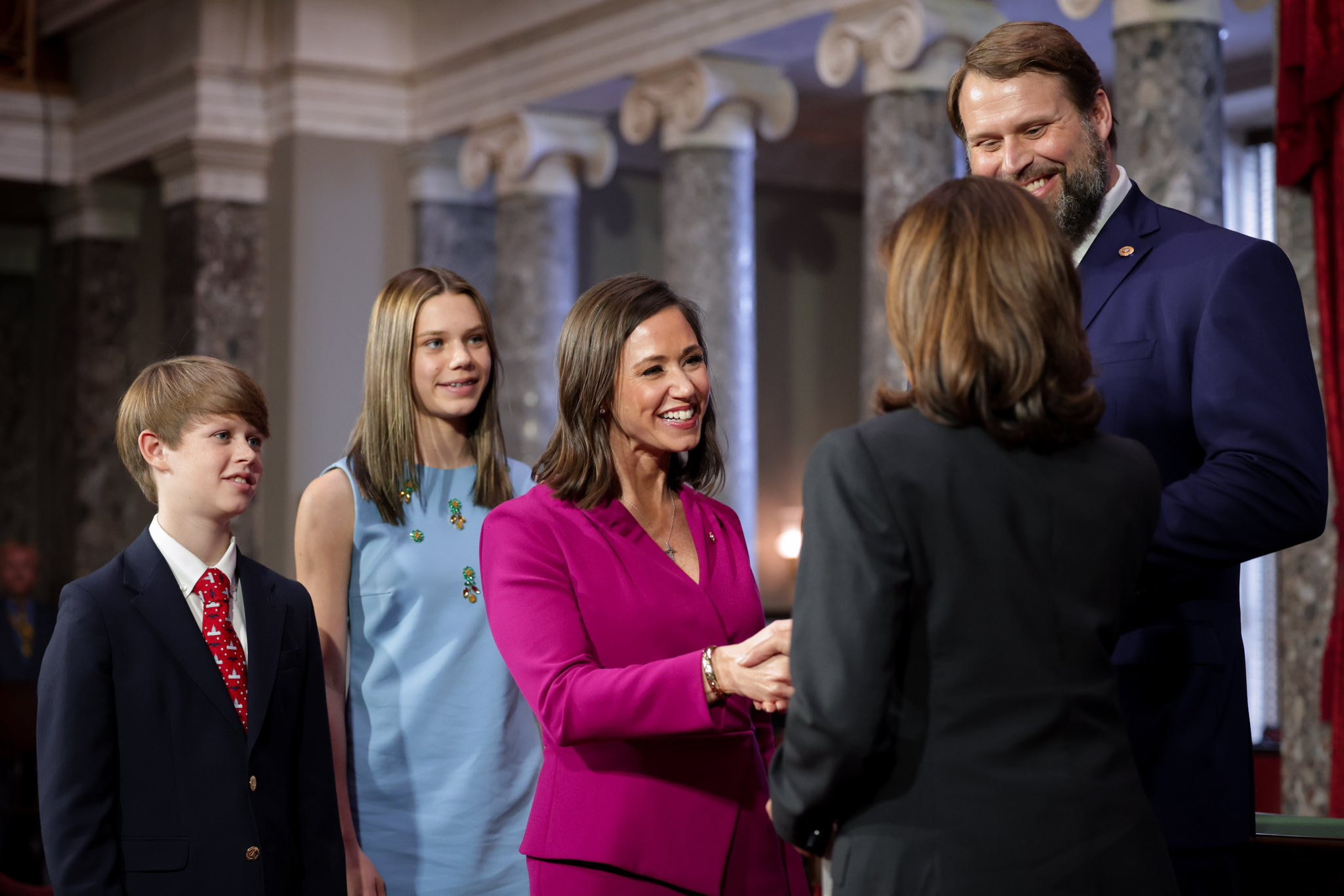
Britt and her family at her inauguration with Vice President Kamala Harris, 2023

=== 2022 election ===
On June 8, 2021, Britt announced her candidacy in the Republican primary for the 2022 Senate election in Alabama. She had never previously run for public office and gradually climbed in the polls as the race went on.

As a Senate candidate, Britt publicly aligned herself with former President Donald Trump. She gave credence to Trump's false claims of fraud in the 2020 presidential election. She advanced to a runoff in the Republican primary against Representative Mo Brooks. Trump officially endorsed Britt on June 10, 2022, calling her a "fearless America First warrior". He had previously withdrawn an endorsement of Brooks. Britt defeated Brooks in the runoff on June 21, 2022, with 63% of the vote. She then handily won the general election on November 8.

After winning the election, Britt became the first woman elected a U.S. senator from Alabama (previous female U.S. senators from Alabama had been appointed to the position). She was also the youngest Republican woman elected U.S. senator and the second-youngest woman overall (Democrat Blanche Lincoln being the youngest).

=== Tenure ===
Britt took office on January 3, 2023. After leadership elections for the 118th United States Congress, she did not say whether she supported Mitch McConnell or Rick Scott for Senate Minority Leader. Before taking office, she was selected as the only incoming senator to serve on the newly formed Republican Party Advisory Council of the Republican National Committee.

Britt's first vote in the U.S. Senate was opposing a Biden administration nominee to a Department of Defense position. During her first month in office, she co-sponsored eight bills and visited the Mexico–United States border twice. She continued to visit the border while co-sponsoring bills to curtail illegal immigration, as well as funding for a border wall.

In February 2023, CoinDesk reported that Britt was one of three members of Alabama's congressional delegation who received money from FTX, a defunct cryptocurrency exchange, alongside Robert Aderholt and Gary Palmer. Her office responded to an inquiry from CoinDesk by stating that the money had been donated. As a member of the Senate Committee on Appropriations, Britt joined 22 other senators in March 2023 in calling for an amendment to the U.S. Constitution requiring a balanced budget each year, while also criticizing the Biden administration's budgetary plans.

In March 2023, after Mexican law enforcement occupied a port in Quintana Roo owned by the Birmingham-based Vulcan Materials Company, Britt joined other members of Alabama's congressional delegation in negotiating the forces' withdrawal. She called the takeover unlawful and met with Mexican officials at the Washington, D.C. embassy, condemning the actions taken at the port. The Mexican personnel withdrew from the port by the end of the month.

A 2024 study by McCourt School of Public Policy of Georgetown University ranked Britt as the least bipartisan U.S. senator in 2023.

==== Response to 2024 State of the Union address ====
External videos
- Republican Response to the State of the Union Address, March 7, 2024, C-SPAN

On March 7, 2024, Britt gave the Republican response to President Joe Biden's State of the Union Address, which he delivered earlier that night. She criticized Biden's policies on immigration and the economy, called Biden "dithering and diminished", and said that Republicans "strongly support continued nationwide access to in vitro fertilization".

After blaming Biden for the increase of migrants at the border and saying that she had visited the border shortly after taking office, Britt mentioned a woman who had told her that she was "sex trafficked by the cartels starting at the age of 12". Britt said: "we wouldn't be okay with this happening in a Third World country. This is the United States of America, and it is past time, in my opinion, that we start acting like it. President Biden's border policies are a disgrace." She appeared to imply that the woman had been abused recently in the U.S. because of Biden's policies.

==== Fact-check of misleading sex trafficking story ====
In a TikTok post that went viral, journalist Jonathan M. Katz was the first person to identify Britt's unnamed woman as Karla Jacinto Romero. Jacinto was 12 in 2004 when she was forced into prostitution in Mexican brothels; she escaped four years later. Jacinto was not trafficked into the U.S., whose president at the time was George W. Bush, not Biden. Britt's communication director later confirmed to the Washington Post that Britt was referring to Jacinto. Jacinto has said that drug cartels were not involved in her experience, though Britt on another occasion said that they were. The New York Times phoned Jacinto in Mexico and was told that she found out on social media about Britt telling her story during the speech. Jacinto said that she "thought it was very strange" and that she preferred to keep politics out of her work to stop trafficking. The Times called Britt's account "highly misleading and improperly contextualized". Jacinto told CNN that Britt "should first take into account what really happens before telling a story of that magnitude" and that she had not met with Britt individually, as Britt had implied, but at an event with other activists and government officials. Jacinto had told her story to a Congressional committee in Washington in 2015, one that had nothing to do with the U.S. border or "cartels".

Britt eventually acknowledged that Jacinto's experience preceded Biden's presidency but continued to criticize his immigration policies.

==== Reactions to her response ====
Britt's speech received mixed reviews ranging from bewilderment to dismay, including from Republicans. Trump praised it and wrote, "Katie Britt was a GREAT contrast to an Angry, and obviously very Disturbed, 'President'" on his social media platform, Truth Social. Senator Mitch McConnell commended her speech saying: "I have zero criticism of her performance. I thought it was really outstanding." Former Trump aide Alyssa Farah Griffin called Britt's decision to deliver her speech from a kitchen "bizarre", and Democratic Representative Brendan Boyle criticized Britt's "overacting". New York magazine's Intelligencer described the speech as "lurid and banal" and delivered with a "broad range of over-the-top emotions"; The Independent wrote that journalists mocked it online as "dramatic", "creepy", and "insincere". Two days later, Saturday Night Live lampooned the response in what the Washington Post called a "stinging parody" in which Britt (portrayed by Scarlett Johansson) auditioned for the part of "Scary Mom".

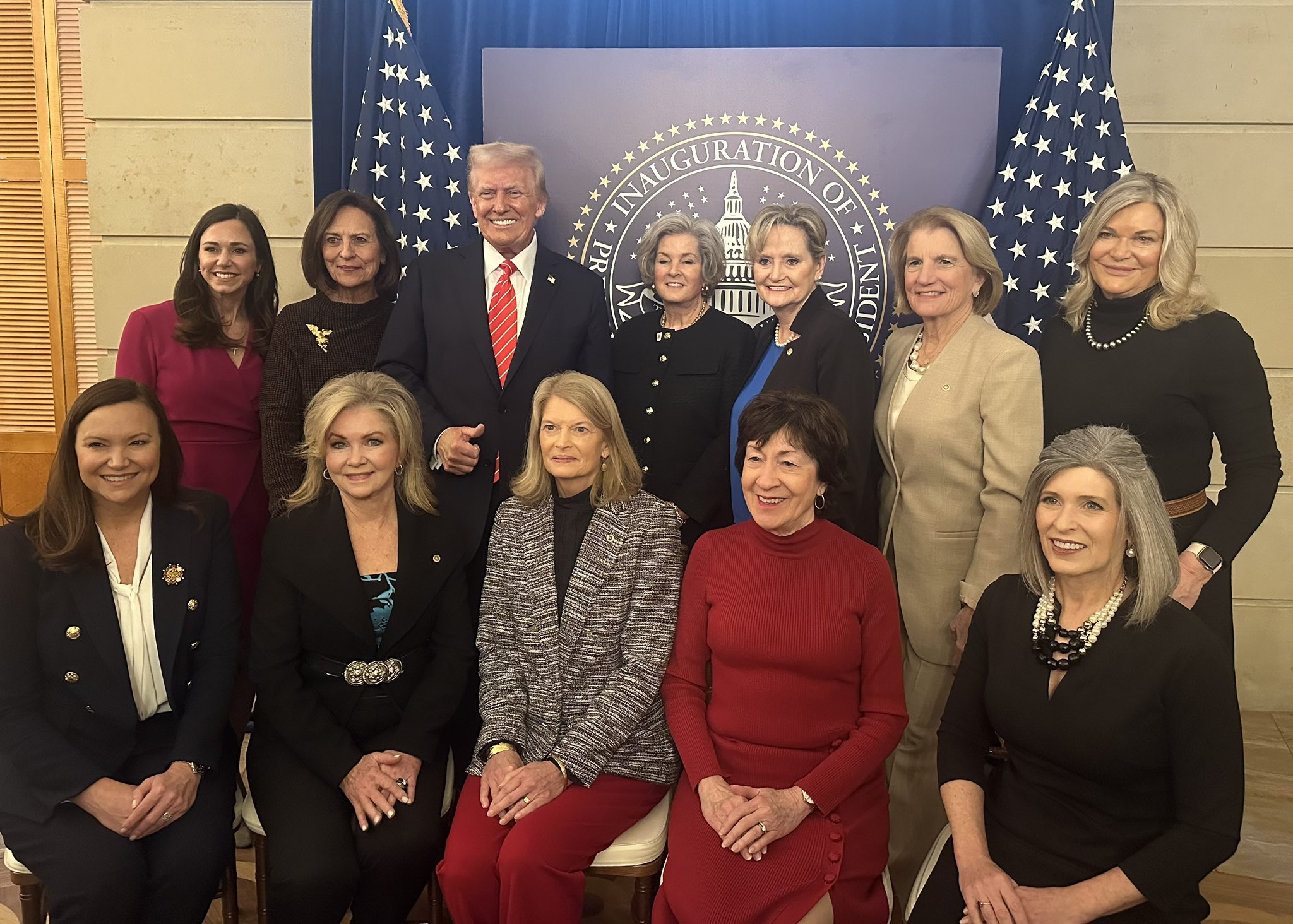
Britt with President Donald Trump, Susie Wiles, and fellow female Republican senators, January 2025

==== 119th United States Congress committee assignments ====
- Committee on Appropriations
- Committee on Banking, Housing, and Urban Affairs
  - Subcommittee on Financial Institutions and Consumer Protection
  - Subcommittee on Housing, Transportation and Community Development (chair)
  - Subcommittee on Securities, Insurance, and Investment
- Committee on the Judiciary
- Committee on Rules and Administration

Caucuses

- Senate Republican Conference

== Political positions ==
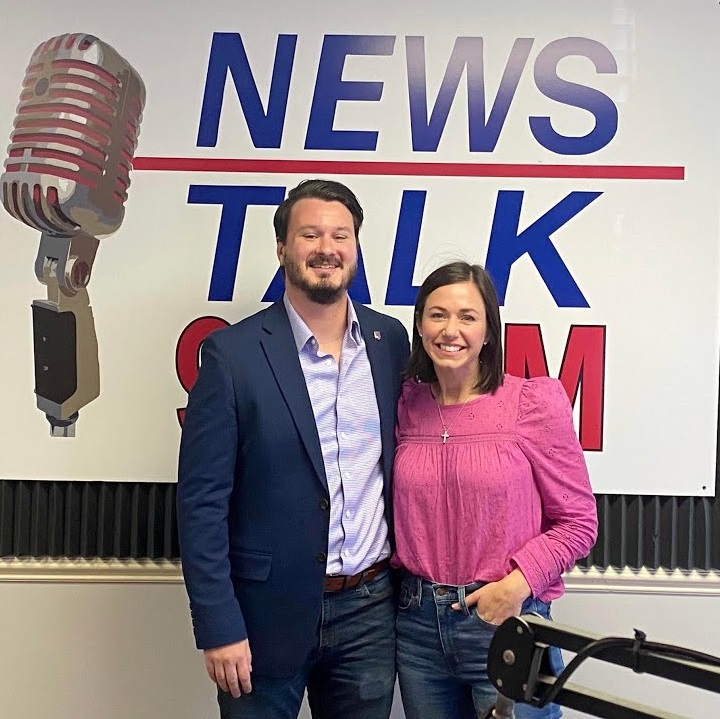
Britt with radio host Joey Clark in 2021

=== Abortion ===
Britt identifies herself as pro-life, a stance that was scrutinized during the 2022 U.S. Senate election. Her initial television advertisements emphasized her view on abortion, asserting that life begins at conception and equating late-term abortions to murder. In May 2022, just before the first round of the Republican primary, rival candidate Michael Durant criticized Britt's abortion stance. He pointed out a resolution passed by the Student Senate while she was president of the University of Alabama Student Government Association that demanded that morning-after pills be made available at the university health center's pharmacy, which was already prescribing the pills at the time. In response, Britt's campaign claimed she neither supported nor voted on the resolution and was unable to veto it due to the limitations of her position. The Alabama Political Reporter corroborated these statements based on The Crimson White articles from the time of Britt's presidency. Furthermore, Britt's campaign insisted she would "uphold the sanctity of life" if elected senator.

Britt responded to the Alabama Supreme Court's 2024 ruling that frozen embryos should be considered living beings by saying that "defending life and ensuring continued access to IVF services for loving parents are not mutually exclusive". She subsequently advocated for state and national bills to protect families' rights to seek IVF services. Britt has stood by Donald Trump's plan to leave abortion as a state issue.

=== Education ===
In July 2021, Britt supported a motion from Alabama Governor Kay Ivey to ban the teaching of critical race theory in public schools. She has been called a "vocal proponent" of school choice by Yellowhammer News.

In April 2022, Britt said, "Our schools should be focused on education, not indoctrination. Of course, our youngest students should not be learning about sex in the classroom—that's the role of parents, not teachers. We need to get God back in our classrooms and return students to saying the Pledge of Allegiance every day while standing for our flag."

=== Foreign policy ===
Britt is a critic of the Chinese Communist Party. In August 2022, she charged the Biden administration with inaction and "total weakness" in regard to China, highlighting humanitarian crises in China, as well as its dominance in manufacturing, saying that China was "taking jobs". In September 2022, she joined other Republicans in accusing the social media platform TikTok of being a "Trojan horse" for the Chinese Communist Party. In October 2022, Britt pledged to co-sponsor a bill introduced by Senators Tommy Tuberville and Tom Cotton to keep Chinese-owned companies from purchasing American farmland. In March 2023, Britt and Cotton introduced the Not One More Inch or Acre Act, which would ban any Chinese national or Chinese entity from owning American land. Britt and Cotton introduced the bill again in January 2025.

In 2022, as a Senate candidate, Britt wrote an op-ed pledging that she would support Israel if elected, writing, "Supporting Israel is in America's interest, it's in Alabama's interest, and as a Christian conservative, I believe God commands us to support Israel." In November 2023, she compared the October 7, 2023 Hamas-led attack on Israel to the September 11 attacks and said she opposed a ceasefire. Britt supported a $14.3 billion aid package for Israel passed in the Republican-controlled House. In July 2024, Britt and Jim Risch introduced the Countering Hate Against Israel by Federal Contractors Act, a bill that would bar the federal government "from contracting with entities who boycott the State of Israel".

In February 2025, President Trump announced that Britt would lead the U.S. delegation to attend Uruguayan President Yamandú Orsi's inauguration.

In June 2026, Britt praised President Trump's decision to launch the 2026 Iran war, with her spokesperson saying, "Britt believes the president has done what no other leader in the world has had the courage to do in nearly 50 years by taking on the Iranian regime head-on in his quest to keep Americans safe and secure."

=== Gun rights ===
Following the passing of the Protecting Our Kids Act in June 2022, Britt told 1819 News that she believes red flag laws are a "gateway to push [a] disarming agenda". She opposes gun laws that she says infringe on the Second Amendment. She has called the Second Amendment "a critical check against the timeless tyranny of government".

=== Immigration ===
Britt supports reducing legal immigration "to a sensible level" and prioritizing skills and merit over family associations. She has said she will introduce legislation to prevent birthright citizenship from applying to children whose parents entered the country illegally. She also supports and has pledged to sponsor the RAISE Act, first introduced by Senator Tom Cotton in 2017. Britt introduced the Laken Riley Act.

=== LGBT rights ===
In April 2022, Britt voiced support for the Alabama Vulnerable Child Protection Act (SB184), which criminalizes gender-affirming surgeries for transgender youth, as well as HB322, which was modeled after the Florida Parental Rights in Education Act and requires students to only use restrooms that align with the gender listed on their birth certificate.

=== Technology and social media ===
Following her election to the U.S. Senate, Britt named expansion of broadband access as one of her areas of focus. After the release of the Twitter Files in December 2022, Britt joined Alabama representatives Jerry Carl and Barry Moore in calling for reform to Section 230, specifically criticizing Big Tech and saying that she was looking forward to congressional hearings "getting to the bottom of what occurred at Twitter in 2020".

In January 2025, Britt and Senators Chris Murphy, Ted Cruz, and Brian Schatz introduced the Kids Off Social Media Act (KOSMA). Senators John Curtis, Peter Welch, John Fetterman, Ted Budd, Mark Warner, and Angus King also co-sponsored the Act, which would set a minimum age of 13 to use social media platforms and prevent social media companies from feeding "algorithmically targeted" content to users under 17. Britt said: "There's no doubt our country is in the throes of a mental health crisis, and the rise of social media usage among children and teenagers is inextricably tied to this issue. As a mom, this is something my own kids and their friends have to contend with every day. And as a senator, I know our nation has to contend with it to safeguard the next generation. Putting in place commonsense guardrails that protect our kids from the dangers of social media is critical for their future and America's future. I'm committed to working with my colleagues on both sides of the aisle to put parents in the driver's seat and enact commonsense, age-appropriate solutions to tackle this generational challenge".

== Personal life ==
Katie Britt is married to Wesley Britt, a former NFL player. They met while attending the University of Alabama and married on March 8, 2008. They live in Montgomery, Alabama, and have two children.

== Electoral history ==
Republican primary for the 2022 United States Senate election in Alabama
Party	Candidate	Votes	%
Republican	Katie Britt	289,425	44.8
Republican	Mo Brooks	188,539	29.2
Republican	Michael Durant	150,817	23.3
Republican	Jake Schafer	7,371	1.1
Republican	Karla DuPriest	5,739	0.9
Republican	Lillie Boddie	4,849	0.7
Total votes		646,740	100.0

Republican primary runoff for the 2022 United States Senate election in Alabama
Party	Candidate	Votes	%
Republican	Katie Britt	253,251	63.0
Republican	Mo Brooks	148,636	37.0
Total votes		401,887	100.0

2022 United States Senate election in Alabama
Party	Candidate	Votes	%	±%
Republican	Katie Boyd Britt	940,048	66.64	+2.68
Democratic	Will Boyd	435,428	30.87	−5.00
Libertarian	John Sophocleus	32,790	2.32	N/A
Write-in		2,454	0.17	+0.00
Total votes		1,410,720	100.00	

Party political offices
Preceded by Richard Shelby	Republican nominee for U.S. Senator from Alabama (Class 3); 2022	Most recent
Preceded by Sarah Huckabee Sanders	Response to the State of the Union address 2024	Succeeded by Elissa Slotkin
Vacant Title last held by Renee Ellmers; 2017 as Chair of the Republican Women's Policy Committee	Chair of the Republican Women's Caucus; 2025–present Served alongside: Kat Cammack	Incumbent
U.S. Senate
Preceded by Richard Shelby	U.S. Senator (Class 3) from Alabama; 2023–present Served alongside: Tommy Tuberville, Barry Moore (elect)	Incumbent
U.S. order of precedence (ceremonial)
Preceded by Peter Welch	Order of precedence of the United States as United States Senator	Succeeded by Eric Schmitt
Preceded by Eric Schmitt	United States senators by seniority 83rd	Succeeded by Pete Ricketts
