= George Helmy =

American politician (born 1979)

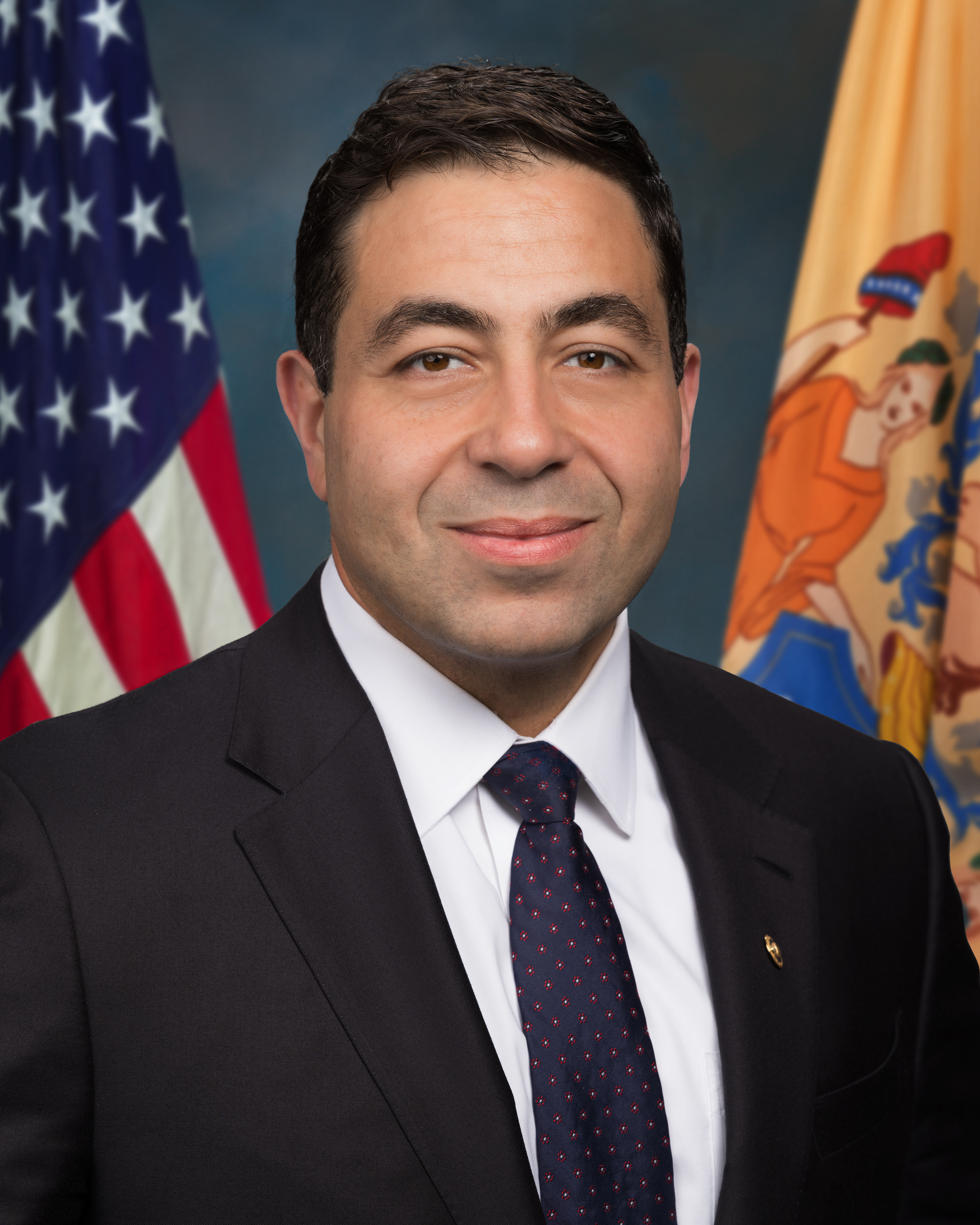
- Official portrait, 2024

United States Senator from New Jersey
- In office August 23, 2024 – December 8, 2024
- Appointed by: Phil Murphy
- Preceded by: Bob Menendez
- Succeeded by: Andy Kim

Chief of Staff to the Governor of New Jersey
- In office February 4, 2019 – September 30, 2023
- Governor: Phil Murphy
- Preceded by: Kathleen Frangione (acting)
- Succeeded by: Diane Gutierrez-Scaccetti

Personal details
- Born: George Samir Helmy; October 27, 1979 (age 46) Jersey City, New Jersey, U.S.
- Party: Democratic (2018, 2024–present)
- Other political affiliations: Republican (before 2011); Independent (2011–2018, 2018–2024)
- Spouse: Caroline Helmy
- Children: 2
- Education: Rutgers University, Newark (BA); Harvard University (MLA)
- Helmy's voice Helmy on the humanitarian crisis in Gaza. Recorded November 18, 2024

George Samir Helmy (born October 27, 1979) is an American politician who served as a United States senator from New Jersey from August to December 2024. A member of the Democratic Party, he was appointed by governor Phil Murphy after Senator Bob Menendez resigned. He served as Murphy's chief of staff from 2019 to 2023. Helmy was the first Coptic American U.S. senator. As of 2025, Helmy serves on the Rutgers University Board of Governors.

== Early life and education ==
Helmy was born in Jersey City, New Jersey, to two Egyptian-born immigrants, and grew up in Glen Ridge, New Jersey. He played on the basketball and football teams at Glen Ridge High School. He received a bachelor's degree in psychology from Rutgers University–Newark and a master's degree in finance and management from Harvard University. Helmy is Egyptian American.

== Career ==
Helmy worked for UPS as a business operations manager from 2001 to 2013, and as staff assistant and constituent advocate for Senator Frank Lautenberg from 2012 to 2013. He then served as deputy and later state director for Senator Cory Booker before being hired as Governor Phil Murphy's chief of staff in January 2019. He resigned in October 2021 to join Murphy's reelection campaign before returning to the role 18 days later, after the election. Helmy left the governor's office at the end of September 2023 and was succeeded by NJDOT commissioner Diane Gutierrez-Scaccetti. After departing the governor's office, he served as executive vice president and chief external affairs and policy officer at RWJBarnabas Health and as a commissioner of the Port Authority of New York and New Jersey.

On June 6, 2020, former Department of Health Assistant Commissioner Christopher Neuwirth sued the State of New Jersey, including Governor Murphy, Chief of Staff George Helmy, and New Jersey Attorney General Matthew Platkin for firing him over whistleblowing that State Police Superintendent Patrick J. Callahan tried pressuring him into testing Helmy's relatives for COVID-19 in April 2020. At that time, the state Department of Health was experiencing a shortage of COVID-19 tests, so Neuwirth declined the request and reported the incident as an ethics violation.

Helmy was a registered Republican until 2011, when he became an independent voter. He briefly registered as a Democrat in 2018, to vote in the party's primary that year for U.S. representative in New Jersey's 11th congressional district, but left the party at the end of the year, and remained an independent until March 2024, when he re-joined the Democratic Party.

=== U.S. Senate ===
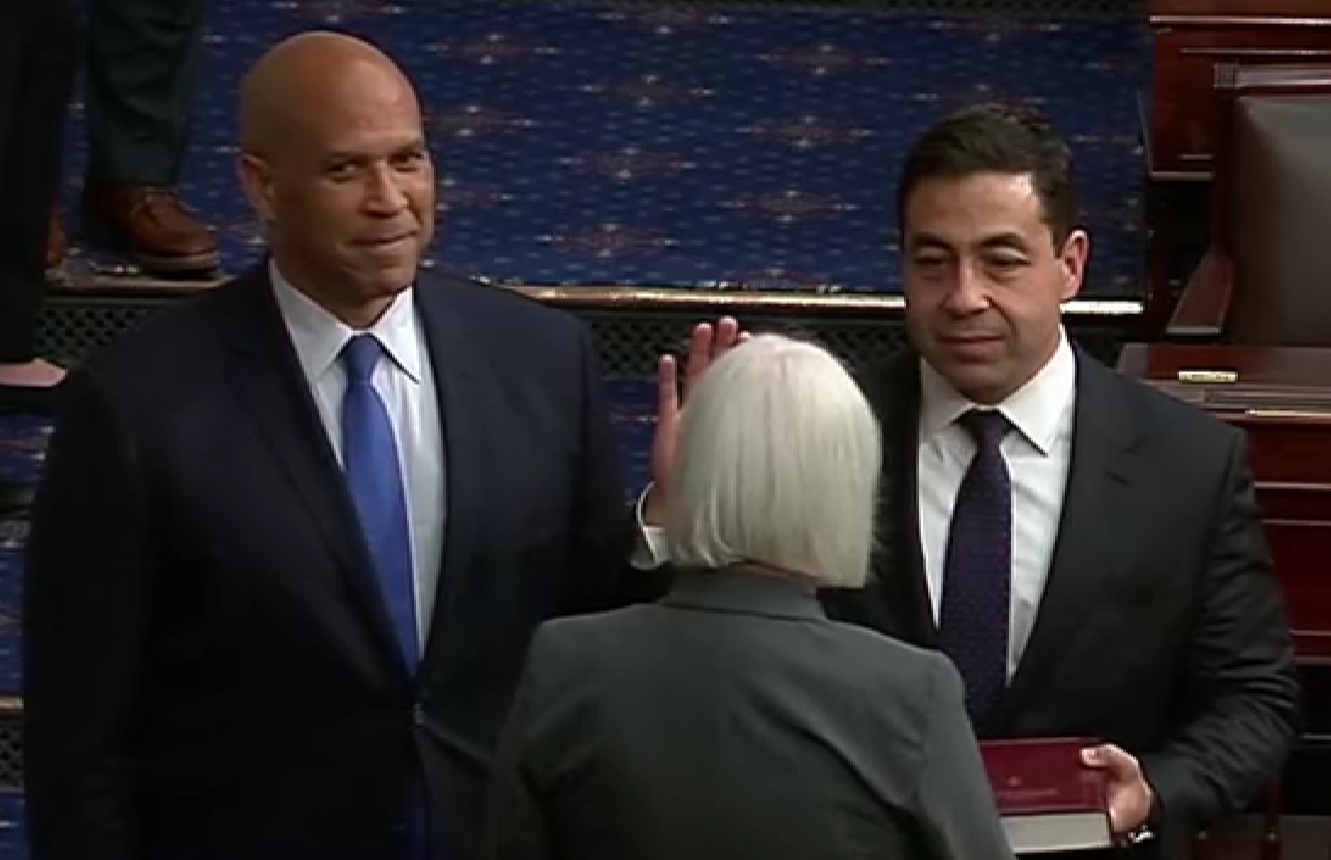
Senate president pro tempore Patty Murray swears in Helmy, as Senator Cory Booker looks on.

The New Jersey Globe reported on August 13, 2024, that Helmy would be appointed to the United States Senate seat vacated by the resignation of Bob Menendez. Murphy announced Helmy's appointment on August 16. On September 9, he was sworn in by Senate President pro tempore Patty Murray. He was assigned as a caretaker and was not a candidate in the November 2024 election. Murphy announced that Helmy would resign after the 2024 election was certified, to be replaced by the election's winner, to give New Jersey's new senator an advantage in seniority over the other newly elected senators, who take office on January 3, 2025. Andy Kim won that election. Helmy resigned on December 8, 2024, with Kim taking office the next day. Helmy was the sole Arab American in the Senate during his brief tenure.

On September 10, 2024, Helmy introduced his first sponsored bill, which would rename facilities at the Paterson Great Falls National Historical Park in honor of Congressman Bill Pascrell, who had died on August 21, 2024.

In his September 19, 2024 maiden speech, Helmy highlighted youth mental health as an issue he wished to focus on as a Senator. Helmy has emphasised the health impacts of social media use for children, and spoke with Alabama Republican Katie Britt in support of the Stop the Scroll Act. The prospective act would mandate warning labels for mental health risks on social media platforms.

In a speech to the Senate on November 18, 2024, Helmy spoke of the humanitarian crisis in the Gaza Strip, arguing that the then-death toll of 44,000 Palestinians in the Gaza war, half of whom were women and children, "should shock our conscience to the very core". Helmy stated that he had toured a Jordan warehouse with abundant supplies of aid, which were unable to reach Gaza due to the ongoing Israeli blockade.

==== Committee assignments ====
- Committee on Banking, Housing, and Urban Affairs
- Committee on Finance
- Committee on Foreign Relations

=== Post-senate career ===
In February 2025, Governor Phil Murphy appointed Helmy to serve on the Rutgers University Board of Governors, effective until June 30, 2030. In June 2025, Murphy unveiled a budget that diverted opioid settlement funds to New Jersey hospitals under the pretense of aiding facilities affected by Medicaid cuts in the One Big Beautiful Bill Act. However, Helmy's post-Senate transition to executive vice president of RWJBarnabas Health raised conflict-of-interest concerns.

== Personal life ==
As of 2024, Helmy lives in Mountain Lakes, New Jersey. He and his wife, Caroline, have two children. Helmy is the first Coptic American U.S. senator.

== See also ==
- List of Arab and Middle Eastern Americans in the United States Congress

U.S. Senate
| Preceded by Bob Menendez | United States Senator (Class 1) from New Jersey; 2024; Served alongside: Cory Booker | Succeeded by Andy Kim |
U.S. order of precedence (ceremonial)
| Preceded by Jeffrey Chiesa as Former U.S. Senator | Order of precedence of the United States | Succeeded by Paul G. Kirk as Former U.S. Senator |
