= Delmar, Delaware =

- Town
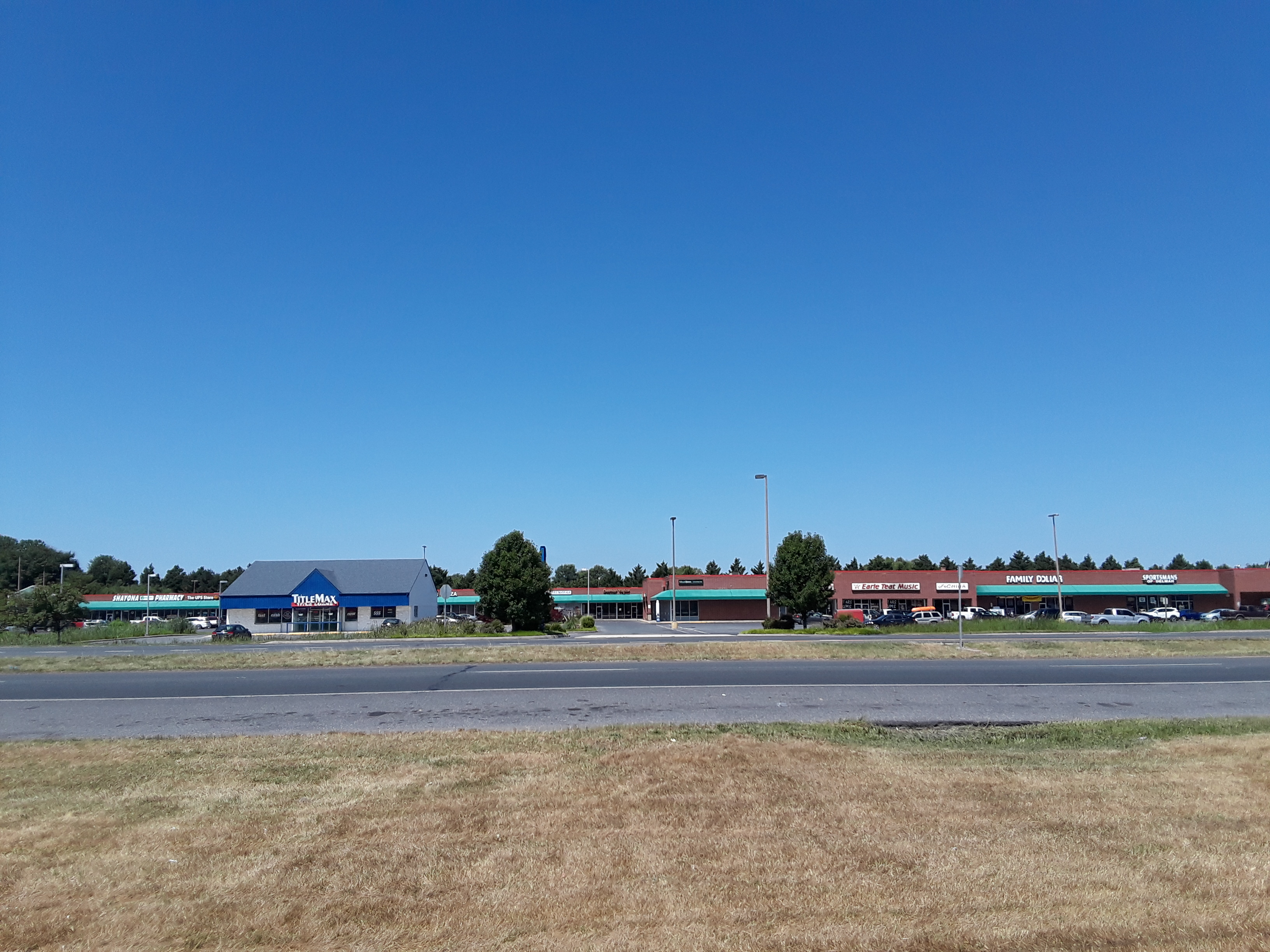
- State Line Plaza on US Route 13 in Delmar

- Flag Seal
- Motto: The Little Town Too Big for One State
- Location of Delmar in Sussex County, Delaware.

- Location within the state of Delaware Delmar (the United States)
- Coordinates: 38°27′23″N 75°34′38″W
- Country: United States
- State: Delaware
- County: Sussex
- Founded: 1859
- Incorporated: 1899

Government
  - Type: Mayoral
  - Mayor: Michael Houlihan
  - Vice Mayor: Mary Lee Pase

Area
  - Total: 1.90 sq mi (4.92 km^{2})
  - Land: 1.90 sq mi (4.92 km^{2})
  - Water: 0 sq mi (0.00 km^{2}) 0.0%
- Elevation: 52 ft (16 m)

Population (2020)
  - Total: 2,027
  - Density: 1,066.5/sq mi (411.79/km^{2})
- Time zone: UTC−5 (Eastern)
  - Summer (DST): UTC−4 (Eastern)
- ZIP code: 19940
- Area code: 302
- FIPS code: 10-20380
- GNIS feature ID: 213878
- Website: www.townofdelmar.us

Delmar is a town in Sussex County, Delaware, United States, on the Maryland border along the Transpeninsular Line. Its motto is "The Little Town Too Big for One State." As of the 2020 census, Delmar had a population of 2,027. It is part of the Salisbury, Maryland-Delaware Metropolitan Statistical Area and a suburb of Salisbury, MD.

== History ==
The Town of Delmar was founded in October 1859 with the extension of the Delaware Railroad to the southern boundary of Delaware. The Transpeninsular Line was responsible for the founding of this unique bi-state town because the Charter of the Delaware Railroad Company permitted only the building of a railroad within the State of Delaware and the charter of the corresponding railroad company in Maryland permitted only the laying of railroad track within the State of Maryland. Thus, in 1859, the two respective railroads met and the town of Delmar was born. The name is a portmanteau of the states whose border this railroad center straddles - Delaware and Maryland.

The Town of Delmar grew slowly until 1884 when the New York, Philadelphia and Norfolk Railroad (in 1921 acquired by the Pennsylvania Railroad) completed a railroad from Pocomoke City, Maryland to Cape Charles, Virginia and also established a ferry service across the Chesapeake Bay between Cape Charles and Norfolk, Virginia. These new developments immediately made the Delmarva Peninsula an important link between the north and south. The Town of Delmar, being the midway town of the Delmarva Peninsula and already a railroad terminal, was the point for trains to change crews and locomotives and also a center for maintenance of the rolling equipment. As a result of these developments, a tremendous influx of experienced railroad men moved into the community and considerable extra employment was furnished for local townspeople. During this accelerated rapid growth period, Delmar became a "boom town". New dwelling units sprang up all over town and new businesses were established to meet the demands of its growing population. By 1889, the population of the Town of Delmar had increased to 680 and was still growing.

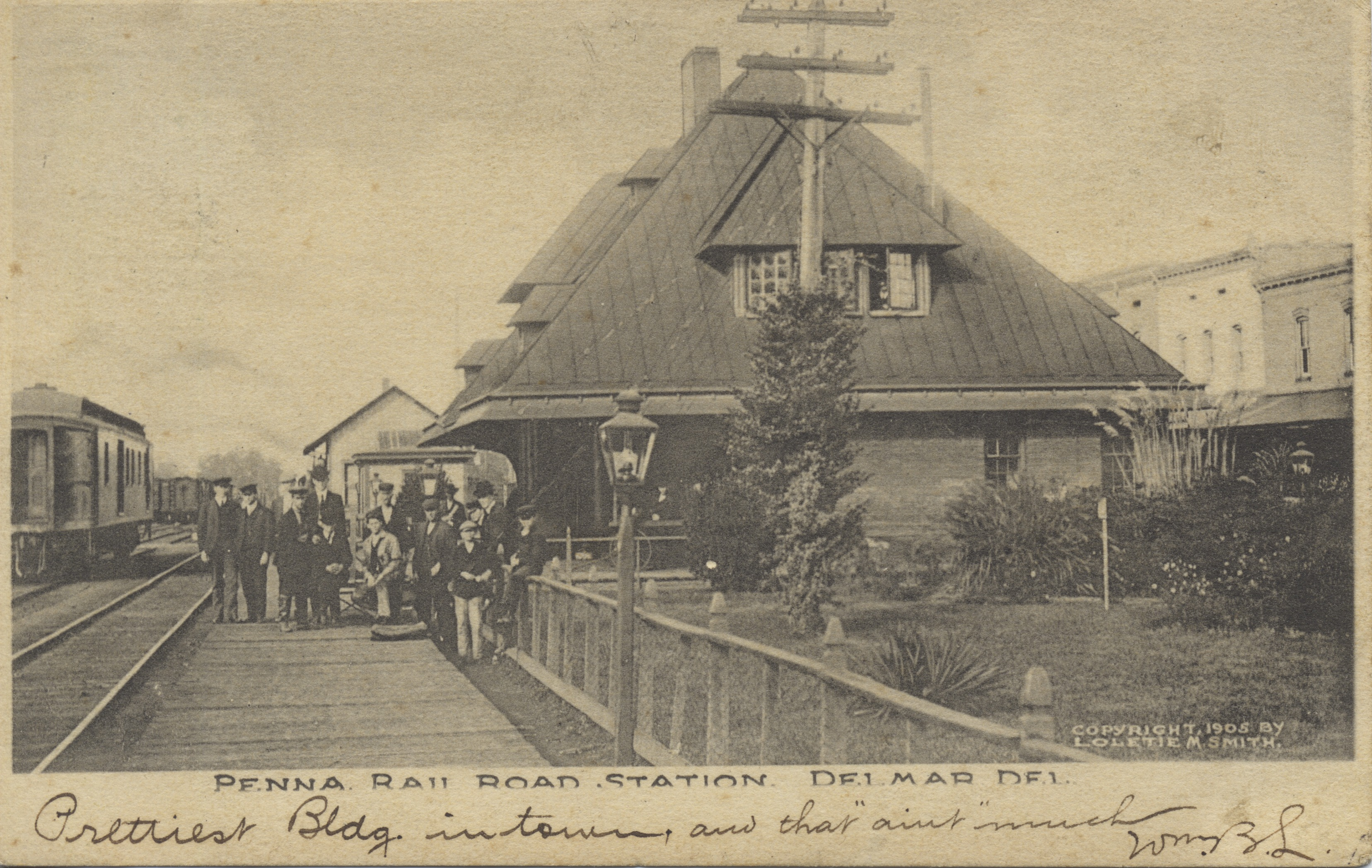
Railway station, 1905

In 1888, the Town of Delmar, Maryland was granted a charter by the General Assembly of Maryland. An examination of this charter and the laws of Maryland fails to reveal any mention of the twin town of Delmar, Delaware. Therefore, it could be assumed that up until this time there was very little cooperation between halves of the Town of Delmar. The Town of Delmar was almost entirely destroyed by fire in 1892 and again in 1901. The first fire destroyed everything in its path over a ten-acre (40,000 m^{2}) area and the second major fire was almost as destructive. In each instance, the Town of Delmar was rebuilt and continued as a flourishing town. The first indication of any cooperation between Delmar, Maryland and Delmar, Delaware came in 1924 when surveys were conducted for a possible sewerage system for the entire town of Delmar. The construction of the sewerage system in 1927 was considered the first joint project between the two towns in that the law provided that both towns would maintain the outfall sewer with Maryland paying the expenses and billing the Delaware side one-half of all costs.

The biggest push towards abolishing the jurisdictional, legal effects of the state line came when the Lions Club voted to sponsor a project for the consolidation of the two school systems in the town. Since the town was founded, each side had its own individual school with the one in Delaware operating under the local school board and the Maryland school operating under the Wicomico County Board of Education. This very controversial issue was bitterly contested for over three years and finally in 1949, this dream became a reality when the junior and senior high schools were consolidated into one school using the Delaware facilities. Four years later the fourth, fifth and sixth grades were also consolidated with classes in the Maryland school. This controversial decision represented one of the greatest steps forward educationally for the town of Delmar and also towards eliminating the jurisdictional barrier between the two parts of town.

The Dickerson Potato House, Highball Signal, and West Potato House are listed on the National Register of Historic Places.

== Geography ==
According to the United States Census Bureau, the town has a total area of 0.9 square miles (2.3 km^{2}), all land.

== Transportation ==
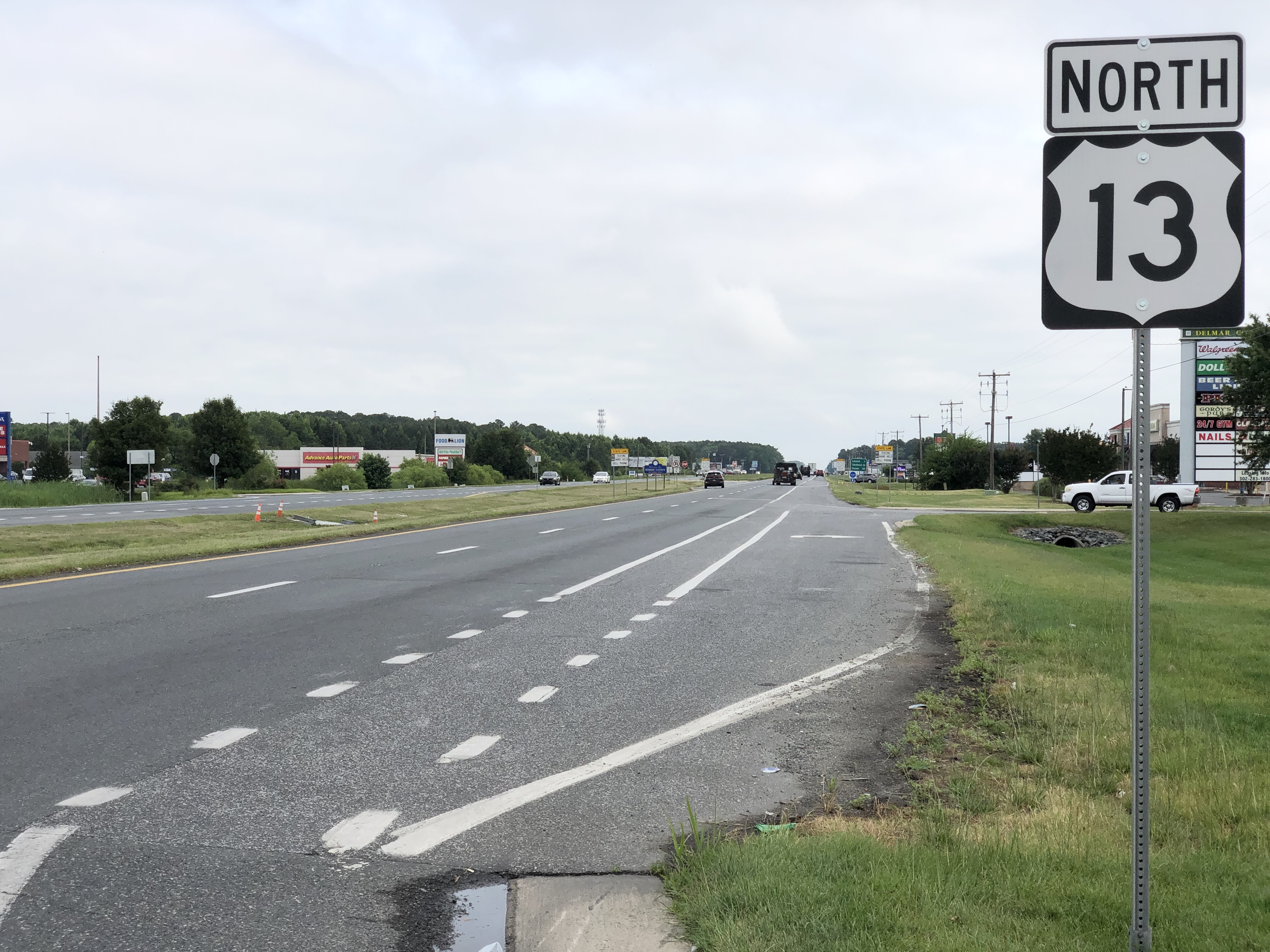
US 13 northbound in Delmar

The main transportation method in and out of Delmar is by road. U.S. Route 13 (Sussex Highway) is the primary highway serving the town, connecting northwards towards Dover and southwards towards Salisbury. Route 54 also traverses the south edge of town, following an east–west alignment on State Street along the state border and town line with neighboring Delmar, Maryland. DART First State operates the Route 212 bus that connects Delmar to Georgetown via Laurel, Seaford, and Bridgeville. The Delmarva Central Railroad's Delmarva Subdivision line passes north–south through Delmar.

== Demographics ==
Historical population
Census	Pop.	Note	%±
1880	130		—
1890	360		176.9%
1900	444		23.3%
1910	530		19.4%
1920	780		47.2%
1930	838		7.4%
1940	881		5.1%
1950	1,015		15.2%
1960	934		−8.0%
1970	943		1.0%
1980	948		0.5%
1990	962		1.5%
2000	1,407		46.3%
2010	1,597		13.5%
2020	2,027		26.9%
U.S. Decennial Census

=== 2020 census ===
As of the 2020 census, Delmar had a population of 2,027. 99.6% of residents lived in urban areas, while 0.4% lived in rural areas.

The median age was 36.4 years. 26.6% of residents were under the age of 18 and 19.3% of residents were 65 years of age or older. For every 100 females there were 83.6 males, and for every 100 females age 18 and over there were 79.5 males age 18 and over.

There were 789 households in Delmar, of which 37.1% had children under the age of 18 living in them. Of all households, 36.8% were married-couple households, 15.6% were households with a male householder and no spouse or partner present, and 40.1% were households with a female householder and no spouse or partner present. About 31.3% of all households were made up of individuals and 15.8% had someone living alone who was 65 years of age or older. There were 840 housing units, of which 6.1% were vacant. The homeowner vacancy rate was 2.6% and the rental vacancy rate was 4.0%.

Racial composition as of the 2020 census
Race	Number	Percent
White	1,248	61.6%
Black or African American	525	25.9%
American Indian and Alaska Native	8	0.4%
Asian	41	2.0%
Native Hawaiian and Other Pacific Islander	0	0.0%
Some other race	37	1.8%
Two or more races	168	8.3%
Hispanic or Latino (of any race)	96	4.7%

=== 2010 census ===
As of the census of 2010, there were 1,597 people living in the town and 606 households. The racial makeup of the town was 75.64% White, 10.58% African American, 0% Native American, 1% Asian, 1.37% from other races, and 8.89% from two or more races. Hispanic or Latino of any race were 6.95% of the population.

In the town, the population was spread out, with 26.6% under the age of 18, 7.9% from 18 to 24, 22.7% from 25 to 44, 23.4% from 45 to 64, and 19.4% who were 65 years of age or older. The median age was 41.6 years. For every 100 females, there were 80.9 males. For every 100 females age 18 and over, there were 75.4 males.

=== Income and poverty ===
The median income for employed civilians over 16 in the town was $25,214, and the median income for a family was $35,500. Males had a median income of $27,375 versus $24,226 for females. About 327 families and 21.5% of the population were below the poverty line.

== Education ==
Delmar is within the Delmar School District. It operates Delmar Middle School and Delmar Senior High School. Students attend Delmar Elementary School in Delmar, Maryland as per an agreement with the Wicomico County Public Schools.

== Notable people ==
- William Alland, actor, Citizen Kane; also a producer and screenwriter
- Alex Ellis, American football tight end for the Tennessee Titans and Jacksonville Jaguars of the National Football League
- Lauren Witzke, far-right conspiracy theorist and Republican nominee for the U.S. Senate in 2020

== See also ==
- Twin cities (geographical proximity)
- Delmar, Maryland
