= Express train =

Type of train service

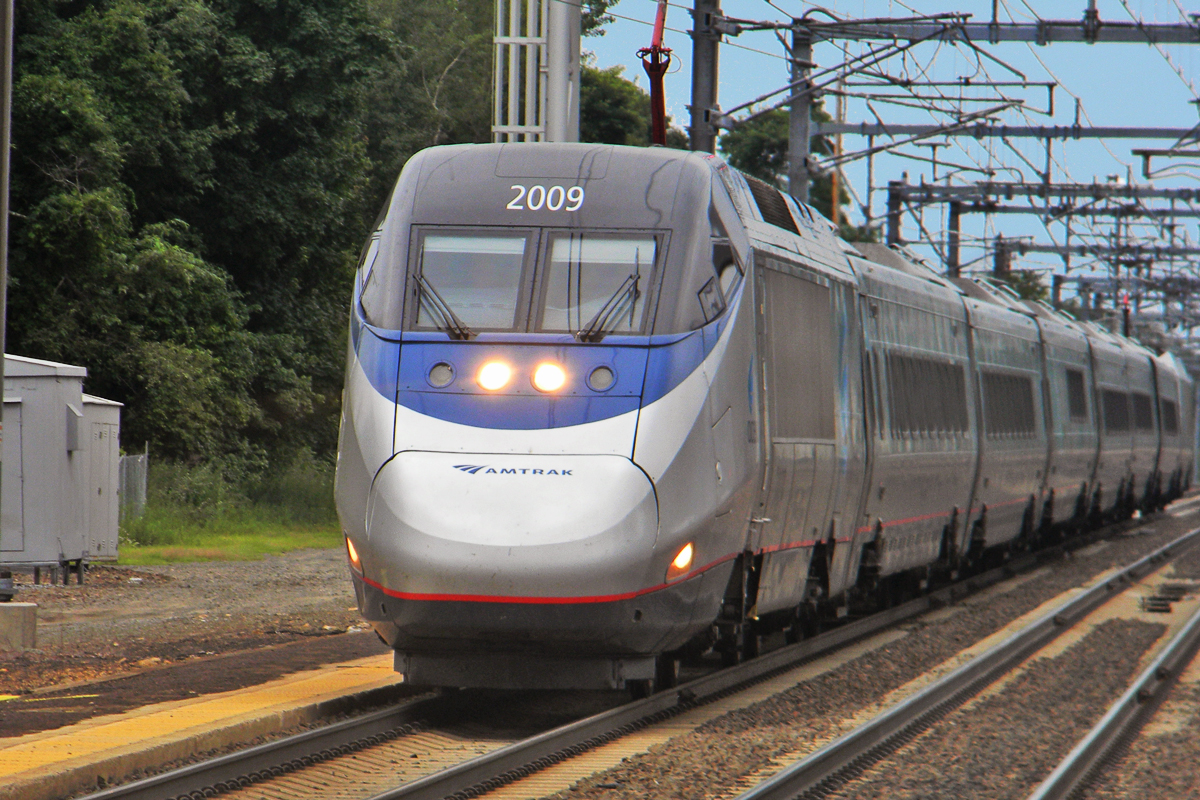
Amtrak's Acela makes a limited number of stops between Washington, D.C., and Boston, allowing it to travel between these cities faster than local trains.

The red trains are local, the blue trains are express

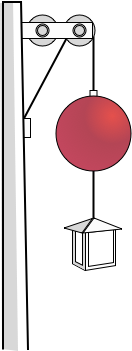
Ball Signal USA (1830) "High ball"

An express train is a type of passenger train that makes few or no stops between its origin and destination stations, usually major destinations, providing faster service than local trains that stop at many or all of the stations along their route. They are sometimes referred to by terms such as "fast train" or "high-speed train", e.g., the German Schnellzug.

Though many high-speed rail services are express, not all trains described as express have been much faster than other services; trains in the United Kingdom in the 19th century were called expresses as long as they had a "journey speed" of at least 40 miles per hour (64 km/h). Express trains sometimes have higher fares than other routes, and bearers of a rail pass may be required to pay an extra fee. First class may be the only class available.

Some express train routes that overlap with local train service may stop at stations near the tail ends of the line. This can be done, for example, where there is no supplemental local service to those stations. Express train routes may also become local at times when ridership is not high enough to justify parallel local service, such as at nighttime.

== See also ==
- Limited express
- Limited-stop
- Skip-stop
- Regional rail
- Inter-city rail
- Highball Signal
