= 2004 New Castle County Executive election =

- November 2, 2004
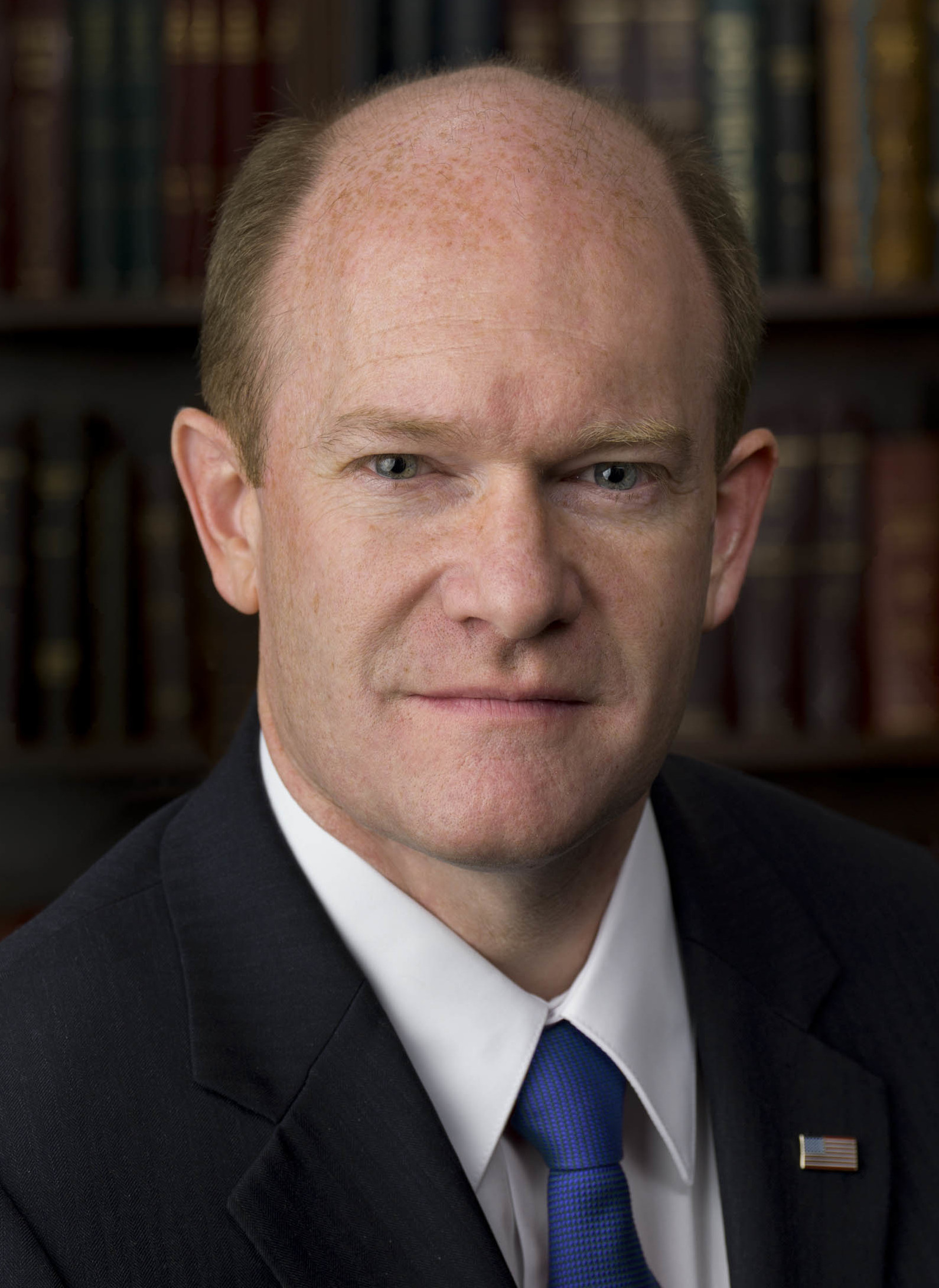

| Nominee | Chris Coons | Chris Castagno |
| Party | Democratic | Republican |
| Popular vote | 131,397 | 93,424 |
| Percentage | 58.45% | 41.55% |
New Castle County Executive before election
Thomas P. Gordon
Democratic
Elected New Castle County Executive
Chris Coons
Democratic

The 2004 New Castle County Executive election was held on November 2, 2004. Incumbent Democratic County Executive Thomas P. Gordon was term-limited and unable to seek a third consecutive term. County Council President Chris Coons won the Democratic primary by a wide margin and faced New Castle City Council President Chris Castagno, the Republican nominee, in the general election. Coons defeated Castagno by a wide margin, winning his first term with 58 percent of the vote to Castagno's 42 percent.

== Democratic primary ==
=== Candidates ===
- Chris Coons, County Council President
- Sherry Freebery, County Chief Administrative Officer, former County Police Chief
- Richard Korn, Hockessin businessman

=== Results ===
Democratic primary results
| Party | Candidate | Votes | % |
|---|---|---|---|
| Democratic | Chris Coons | 17,584 | 66.57% |
| Democratic | Sherry Freebery | 4,702 | 17.80% |
| Democratic | Richard Korn | 4,130 | 15.63% |
| Total votes | | 26,416 | 100.00% |

== General election ==
=== Results ===
2004 New Castle County Executive election
| Party | Candidate | Votes | % |
|---|---|---|---|
| Democratic | Chris Coons | 131,397 | 58.45% |
| Republican | Chris Castagno | 93,424 | 41.55% |
| Total votes | | 224,821 | 100.00% |
| Democratic hold | | | |
