= 2008 New Castle County Executive election =

- November 4, 2008
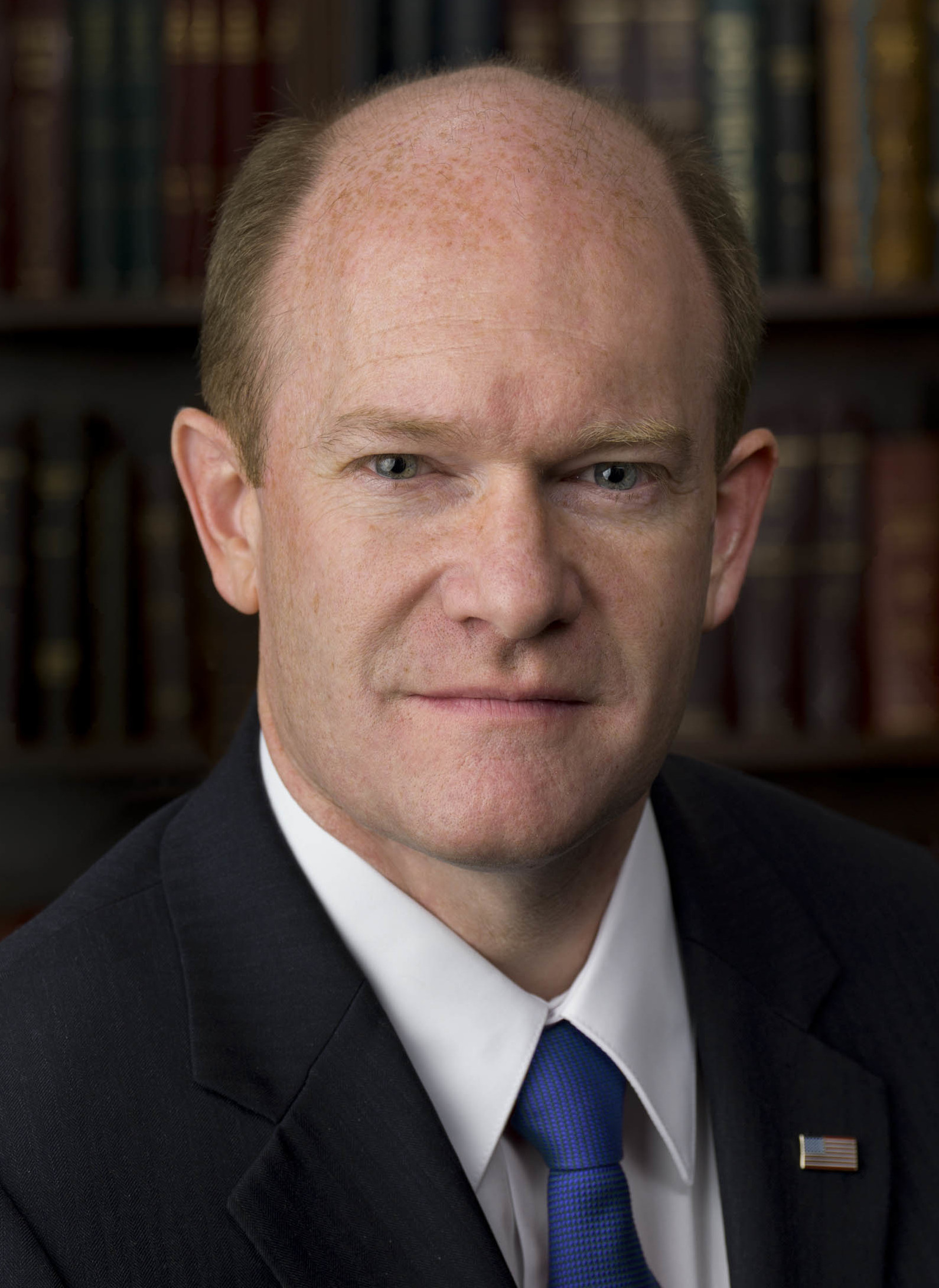
Nominee	Chris Coons
Party	Democratic
Popular vote	194,005
Percentage	100.00%
New Castle County Executive before election
Chris Coons
Democratic
Elected New Castle County Executive
Chris Coons
Democratic

The 2008 New Castle County Executive election was held on November 4, 2008. Incumbent County Executive Chris Coons ran for re-election to a second term. He was challenged in the Democratic primary by former County Executive Thomas P. Gordon, and handily defeated him, winning renomination, 65–35 percent. In the general election, Coons had no opponents and won uncontested. Coons did not end up serving out his full term. He was elected to the U.S. Senate in 2010 and resigned shortly after winning to take his seat.

== Democratic primary ==
=== Candidates ===
- Chris Coons, incumbent County Executive
- Thomas P. Gordon, former County Executive

=== Campaign ===
On March 10, 2008, Gordon announced that he would challenge Coons in the Democratic primary. During Gordon's final year as County Executive, he was indicted for racketeering and mail fraud, ultimately pleading guilty to two misdemeanors. In launching his campaign, Gordon emphasized that he wanted to "help get [the county] back to the way it was" when he left office. Coons also campaigned on his record, noting in his re-election announcement on June 7, 2008, that he was "willing to step up and make the tough choices" as County Executive. As the campaign progressed, Coons raised significantly more than Gordon, enabling him to out-spend him. Coons ultimately defeated Gordon in a landslide, winning his second term.

=== Results ===
Democratic primary results
Party	Candidate	Votes	%
Democratic	Chris Coons (inc.)	31,405	64.76%
Democratic	Thomas P. Gordon	17,088	35.24%
Total votes		48,493	100.00%

== General election ==
=== Results ===
2008 New Castle County Executive election
Party	Candidate	Votes	%
Democratic	Chris Coons (inc.)	194,005	100.00%
Total votes		194,005	100.00%
Democratic hold			
