= Lauren Witzke =

American far-right activist and politician

Personal details
- Born: Lauren Elena Witzke; February 9, 1988 (age 38) Delmar, Delaware, U.S.
- Party: Republican
- Education: Delaware Technical and Community College (attended); Goldey-Beacom College (BA)

Lauren Elena Witzke (born February 9, 1988) is an American far-right political activist known for her anti-LGBTQ, anti-Zionist, white nationalist, and antisemitic views as well as her promotion of QAnon. Witzke was the Republican nominee in the 2020 United States Senate election in Delaware, which she lost to incumbent Democrat Chris Coons. She is a former TV show host for TruNews.

== Early life and education ==
Witzke was born on February 9, 1988, in Delmar, Delaware. She attended Goldey–Beacom College, where she earned a bachelor's degree in business management. At Goldey–Beacom, she played softball as a catcher and shortstop, and volleyball initially as a setter and then defensive specialist.

== Career ==
=== 2020 Senate election ===
On September 16, 2020, Witzke won the Republican primary for the 2020 Senate election in Delaware with 57% of the vote, defeating attorney and former Marine James DeMartino. Witzke said that her opponent was a "RINO", an acronym for 'Republican in name only'. Her candidacy was not endorsed by the Delaware state Republican Party who had instead decided to endorse DeMartino. Witzke's Senate campaign was endorsed by white nationalist Nick Fuentes, who had marched in the August 2017 white nationalist rally in Charlottesville. Witzke accepted Fuentes' endorsement with the response of "Thank you, Nick!" During the general election campaign, Witzke claimed without evidence that Hunter Biden's laptop contained illicit images of "Chris Coons' daughter in addition to seven other underaged girls." PolitiFact rated the claim to be false.

In the November 2020 general election, Witzke was defeated by incumbent Senator Chris Coons 59-38%.

=== Media work ===
After far-right radio host and conspiracy theorist Rick Wiles was hospitalized with COVID-19 in late May 2021, his organization TruNews announced that Witzke would be filling in for him as co-host of the program. After Wiles returned, Witzke was hired as a permanent co-host of his show. As of September 6, 2021, Witzke was let go from TruNews. In October 2021, she revealed she had contracted COVID-19 and said she experienced a loss of senses and "brain fog."

== Political views ==
Witzke has appeared on VDARE, a website that the Anti-Defamation League has called a "xenophobic website" and which the Southern Poverty Law Center calls a website that "regularly publishes articles by prominent white nationalists, race scientists and anti-Semites". Witzke tweeted out her interview with VDARE, writing, "In order to preserve America, we must first preserve American families, our values, and our culture." In October 2020, Witzke defended the far-right organization the Proud Boys and said at one point that they exemplified "patriotic masculinity" and thanked the group for providing security at her campaign rallies. In 2023 she said that "America needs a strong leader that would make even the most infamous of fascists blush." In the same statement, she said that "Racial integration has hurt the black and white community." and that "Blacks are 13% of the population but commit 56% of the murders."

=== Abortion ===
Witzke opposes abortion and supported the overturning of the 1973 Supreme Court decision Roe v. Wade. Upon the death of Ruth Bader Ginsburg in September 2020, Witzke said that "Ruth Bader Ginsberg's obsession with abortion overtly singled out blacks and minorities for extermination." Witzke also attacked her Democratic opponent Chris Coons for being a "Christian-hating baby killer."

=== Black Lives Matter ===
Witzke has described Black Lives Matter as "violent terrorists" who want to "stoke societal unrest, and literally already has blood on their hands" referring to the 2020 Black Lives Matter riots in which David Dorn was killed by a burglar several miles away from riots in St. Louis.

=== COVID-19 ===
Witzke has said that COVID-19 is "satanic" and that COVID-19 vaccine is a "satanic plot" to cause "mass death." In 2022, she co-produced the film Died Suddenly, which promotes false claims about COVID-19 vaccines and Great Reset conspiracy theories.

=== Flat Earth ===
Witzke has described herself as a "flat Earther."

=== Immigration ===
Witzke has supported a complete ban on all immigration to the United States for 10 years. She has also stated that "nationalist populism is the future."

=== LGBTQ people ===
In March 2021, Witzke responded to a tweet from Richard Grenell about a trans woman who had attended CPAC by saying that transgender people are "mentally ill" and "demonic". She also iterated her opposition to both same-sex marriage and gay conservatives being welcomed into the Republican Party. Witzke has also said that Christians should "reclaim the rainbow" and celebrate June (LGBT pride month) as "Christianity month".

Witzke said that the COVID-19 outbreak that afflicted TruNews was a "demonic attack" on the channel for having self-described "ex-gay" Milo Yiannopoulos and called him "Satan's favorite sodomite".

While speaking on an online panel on the post-Trump future of the Republican Party in March 2021, Witzke attacked conservative trans woman Blaire White, saying, "The best thing you can do for us is grow out your moustache and tell people not to live like you." On the same panel, Witzke also espoused the belief that trans people are "sexual predators" and "pedophiles". In this same debate, she mentions "We also have a transgender [sic] on here, you know I don't think we should be giving a platform to this kind of degeneracy which is a gateway drug to pedophilia."

=== Pharmaceuticals ===
Witzke has compared pharmaceuticals to "a form of witchcraft" and said that God had to flood the earth because Nephilim and fallen angels were providing pharmaceuticals to humanity.

=== QAnon ===
Witzke has voiced support for the far-right conspiracy theory QAnon, which centers on claims that a cabal of Satanic, cannibalistic sexual abusers of children operating a global child sex trafficking ring conspired against U.S. President Donald Trump during his term in office. During Hurricane Ian, Witzke suggested that "elites" may have created the devastating hurricane as a "deep state" attempt to punish Florida Governor Ron DeSantis and particularly conservative areas of the state. On the conservative "Shots Fired" streaming broadcast, Witzke claimed that she has "no doubt" that the technology exists to control weather catastrophes.

=== Russia ===
At the 2022 Conservative Political Action Conference, Witzke described Russia as "a Christian nationalist nation", and said "I identify more with Putin's Christian values than I do with Joe Biden." She stated that "Christian Nationalist countries are a threat to the global regime."

=== September 11 attacks ===
Witzke believes that the 9/11 attacks were committed by Israel.

== Personal life ==
Witzke was raised Methodist. She has a history of drug use, and was arrested in 2017 for possession of methamphetamine and heroin, driving under the influence, and resisting arrest, after being found "unresponsive within a car parked in a busy Tennessee intersection." She was later reformed through a Pentecostal faith-based recovery program for which she became program director. She is a recent Evangelical Protestant convert to Orthodox Christianity, received within the Russian Orthodox Church Outside of Russia (ROCOR), and was a catechumen during her Senate campaign.

== Electoral history ==
Republican primary results, 2020
Party	Candidate	Votes	%
Republican	Lauren Witzke	30,702	56.89%
Republican	James DeMartino	23,266	43.11%
Total votes		53,968	100.00%

United States Senate election in Delaware, 2020
Party	Candidate	Votes	%	±%
Democratic	Chris Coons (incumbent)	291,804	59.44%	+3.61%
Republican	Lauren Witzke	186,054	37.90%	−4.33%
Independent Party	Mark Turley	7,833	1.59%	N/A
Libertarian	Nadine Frost	5,244	1.07%	N/A
Total votes		490,935	100.0%	
Democratic hold				

Party political offices
Preceded by Kevin Wade	Republican nominee for U.S. Senator from Delaware (Class 2); 2020	Succeeded by Michael Katz
