= West Potato House =

- U.S. National Register of Historic Places
- Location within Delaware Location within the United States
- Location: U.S. Route 13 north of its junction with Road 454A, near Delmar, Delaware
- Coordinates: 38°28′48″N 75°34′18″W
- Area: 0.1 acres (0.040 ha)
- Built: c. 1925
- MPS: Sweet Potato Houses of Sussex County MPS
- NRHP reference No.: 90001701
- Added to NRHP: November 15, 1990

West Potato House was a historic potato house located near Delmar, Sussex County, Delaware. It was one of the last surviving examples of its building type. It was built about 1925, and is a 1 1/2-story, gable fronted, balloon frame structure on a concrete block foundation. The house had a cellar. It measured 37.5 by 13.9 feet (11.4 by 4.2 m). It retained a number of important elements characteristic of potato house including: tall, narrow proportions, minimal fenestration, ventilation features, and tightly fitting door hatches.

It was placed on the National Register of Historic Places in 1990. It is listed on the Delaware Cultural and Historic Resources GIS system as destroyed or demolished.
