= Victims of Child Abuse Act Reauthorization Act of 2013 =

- Long title: To reauthorize subtitle A of the Victims of Child Abuse Act of 1990.
- Announced in: the 113th United States Congress
- Sponsored by: Sen. Christopher A. Coons (D, DE) and Sen. Roy Blunt (R, MO)
- Number of co-sponsors: 3

Citations
- Public law: Pub. L. 113–163 (text) (PDF)

Codification
- U.S.C. sections affected: 42 U.S.C. § 13001 et seq., 42 U.S.C. § 13004
- Agencies affected: United States Department of Justice Office of the Inspector General, United States Department of Justice
- Authorizations of appropriations: $20,000,000 for each of fiscal years 2014, 2015, 2016, 2017 and 2018

Legislative history
- Introduced in the Senate as S. 1799 by Sen. Christopher A. Coons (D, DE) and Sen. Roy Blunt (R, MO) on December 11, 2013; Committee consideration by United States Senate Committee on the Judiciary; Passed the Senate on June 26, 2014 (unanimous consent); Passed the House on July 28, 2014 (voice vote); Signed into law by President Barack Obama on August 8, 2014

The Victims of Child Abuse Act Reauthorization Act of 2013 (S. 1799; Pub. L. 113–163 (text) (PDF)) is a bill that would reauthorize the Victims of Child Abuse Act of 1990 and would authorize funding through 2018 to help child abuse victims. The funding is directed to Children's Advocacy Centers (CACs).

The bill was introduced into the United States Senate during the 113th United States Congress. It was signed into law on August 8, 2014, by President Barack Obama.

== Background ==
According to the National Children's Alliance, Child Advocacy Centers "employ a multi-disciplinary team of trained professionals to conduct forensic interviews of children who have been victims of abuse. These interviews are designed to be admissible in court, preventing children from being re-traumatized by having to tell their stories multiple times." The organization also reported that in 2012, "more than 286,000 children were served at over 800 Child Advocacy Centers across the United States, with over 197,000 cases reporting sexual abuse."

== Provisions of the bill ==
This summary is based largely on the summary provided by the Congressional Research Service, a public domain source.

The Victims of Child Abuse Act Reauthorization Act of 2013 would amend the Victims of Child Abuse Act of 1990 to authorize appropriations for FY2014-FY2018 for: (1) the children's advocacy program; (2) grants from the Administrator of the Office of Juvenile Justice and Delinquency Prevention to develop and implement multidisciplinary child abuse investigation and prosecution programs; and (3) grants to national organizations to provide technical assistance and training to attorneys and others instrumental to the criminal prosecution of child abuse cases in state or federal courts, for the purpose of improving the quality of criminal prosecution of such cases.

The bill would direct the Inspector General of the Department of Justice (DOJ) to conduct audits of grant recipients to prevent waste, fraud, and abuse of funds by grantees. Defines an "unresolved audit finding" as a finding in the final audit report of the Inspector General that the audited grantee has utilized grant funds for an unauthorized expenditure or otherwise unallowable cost and that is not closed or resolved within 12 months from the date when the final audit report is issued and any appeal has been completed. Directs the Administrator to give priority for grants to eligible entities that did not have an unresolved audit finding during the three fiscal years prior to submitting an application for a grant. Disqualifies a grant recipient that is found to have an unresolved audit finding from receiving grant funds during the following two fiscal years. Directs the Administrator, if an entity is awarded grant funds during the two-fiscal-year period in which the entity is barred from receiving grants, to: (1) deposit an amount equal to the funds that were improperly awarded into the General Fund of the Treasury, and (2) seek to recoup the costs of the repayment to the fund from such entity.

The bill would prohibit the Administrator from awarding a grant to a nonprofit organization that holds money in offshore accounts for the purpose of avoiding paying the tax on unrelated business income.

The bill would require each nonprofit organization awarded a grant that uses prescribed procedures to create a rebuttable presumption of reasonableness for the compensation of its officers, directors, trustees and key employees to disclose to the Administrator in the grant application the process for determining such compensation, the comparability data used, and contemporaneous substantiation of the deliberation and decision.

The bill would prohibit amounts authorized to be appropriated to DOJ from being used by the Administrator, or by any individual or organization awarded discretionary funds through a cooperative agreement, to host or support any expenditure for conferences that uses more than $20,000 in DOJ funds, without prior written authorization by the Deputy Attorney General or other specified officials.

The bill would direct the Deputy Attorney General to submit an annual report to the Senate and House Judiciary Committees on all approved conference expenditures.

== Procedural history ==
The Victims of Child Abuse Act Reauthorization Act of 2013 was introduced into the United States Senate on December 11, 2013, by Sen. Christopher A. Coons (D, DE) and Sen. Roy Blunt (R, MO). The bill was referred to the United States Senate Committee on the Judiciary. The Senate voted to pass the bill with an amendment by unanimous consent on June 26, 2014. The United States House of Representatives voted on July 28, 2014, to pass the bill in a voice vote. President Barack Obama signed it into law on August 8, 2014.

== Debate and discussion ==
The bill was introduced jointly by Senator Coons and Senator Blunt. Blunt stated that "this bill allows Child Advocacy Centers in Missouri and across the country to continue to provide a safe haven for child abuse victims and helps law enforcement hold perpetrators accountable for their actions." Senator Coons agreed, saying "we have a responsibility to protect our children from violence and abuse."

The National Association of Police Organizations (NAPO) supported the bill. The International Association of Chiefs of Police also supported the bill, saying that the "increased funding will enable child victims of violent crimes to receive the services they need and allow law enforcement to better protect children and hold perpetrators accountable."

== See also ==
- List of bills in the 113th United States Congress
