= Chris Coons =

American lawyer and politician (born 1963)

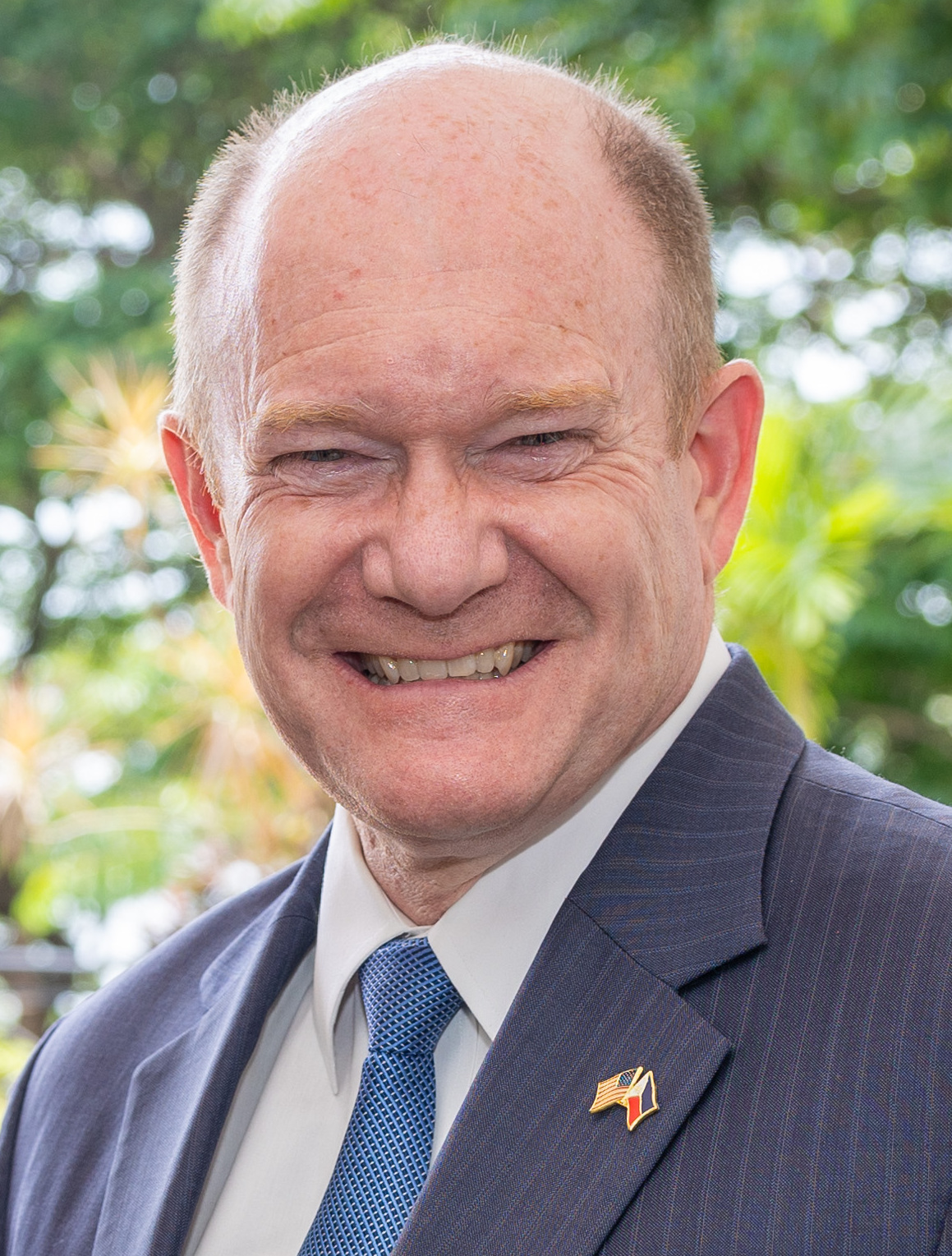
- Coons in 2024

Vice Chair of the Senate Ethics Committee
- Incumbent
- Assumed office January 3, 2025
- Preceded by: James Lankford
- In office January 3, 2017 – February 3, 2021
- Preceded by: Barbara Boxer
- Succeeded by: James Lankford

Chair of the Senate Ethics Committee
- In office February 3, 2021 – January 3, 2025
- Preceded by: James Lankford
- Succeeded by: James Lankford

United States Senator from Delaware
- Incumbent
- Assumed office November 15, 2010 Serving with Lisa Blunt Rochester
- Preceded by: Ted Kaufman

8th New Castle County Executive
- In office January 4, 2005 – November 15, 2010
- Preceded by: Thomas Gordon
- Succeeded by: Paul Clark

President of the New Castle County Council
- In office January 2, 2001 – January 4, 2005
- Preceded by: Stephanie Hansen
- Succeeded by: Paul Clark

Personal details
- Born: Christopher Andrew Coons; September 9, 1963 (age 63) Greenwich, Connecticut, U.S.
- Party: Democratic
- Spouse: Annie Lingenfelter (m. 1996)
- Children: 3
- Education: Amherst College (BA); Yale University (MAR, JD)
- Website: Senate website Campaign website
- Coons's voice Coons questions witnesses on online counterfeit goods. Recorded November 2, 2021

Christopher Andrew Coons (born September 9, 1963) is an American politician and lawyer serving as the senior United States senator from Delaware, a seat he has held since 2010. A member of the Democratic Party, he served as the county executive of New Castle County from 2005 to 2010.

Raised in Hockessin, Delaware, Coons graduated from Amherst College in Massachusetts, where he joined the Delta Kappa Epsilon fraternity. He received graduate degrees from Yale Divinity School and Yale Law School. He went to work as a volunteer relief worker in Kenya, where he had taken classes at the University of Nairobi, later returning to the U.S. to work for the Coalition for the Homeless in New York. He spent some time as a legal clerk in New York before returning to Delaware in 1996, where he spent eight years as in-house counsel for a materials manufacturing company. In the interim he worked for several nonprofit organizations.

Coons served as president of the New Castle County Council from 2001 to 2005 and county executive of New Castle County from 2005 to 2010. He balanced the county budget with a surplus in fiscal year 2010 by cutting spending and raising taxes, and the county maintained a AAA bond rating. Coons contested the 2010 Senate special election for Delaware. He defeated the Republican nominee, Christine O'Donnell, to succeed Ted Kaufman, who had been appointed to the seat when Joe Biden resigned to become Vice President of the United States. He was elected to a full term in 2014. Coons is the vice chair of the Senate Ethics Committee, having chaired the committee from 2021 to 2025. His other committee assignments include Appropriations, Foreign Relations, Judiciary, and Small Business and Entrepreneurship. He previously served as ranking member of the Senate Foreign Relations Subcommittee on African Affairs and the Judiciary Subcommittee on Bankruptcy and the Courts.

Coons co-chaired the 2017 and 2019 National Prayer Breakfasts and co-chairs the weekly Senate Prayer Breakfast. The New York Times called him an "effective" emissary of Joe Biden to former and current Republican lawmakers in Biden's 2020 campaign for president.

Coons became Delaware's senior senator and the dean of Delaware's congressional delegation when Tom Carper retired from the Senate in January 2025.

== Early life and education ==
Coons was born on September 9, 1963, in Greenwich, Connecticut, the son of Sarah Louise "Sally" (née Ives) and Kenelm Winslow "Ken" Coons. His ancestry includes English and Irish. Coons has said that his last name was spelled "Kuntz" when his family immigrated to the United States. He grew up in Hockessin, Delaware, where he attended Yorklyn Elementary School and H. B. DuPont Middle School. His parents struggled financially and divorced in the mid-1970s. He and his two brothers lived with their mother for a few years until 1977, when his mother married Robert W. Gore, the president of W. L. Gore and Associates.

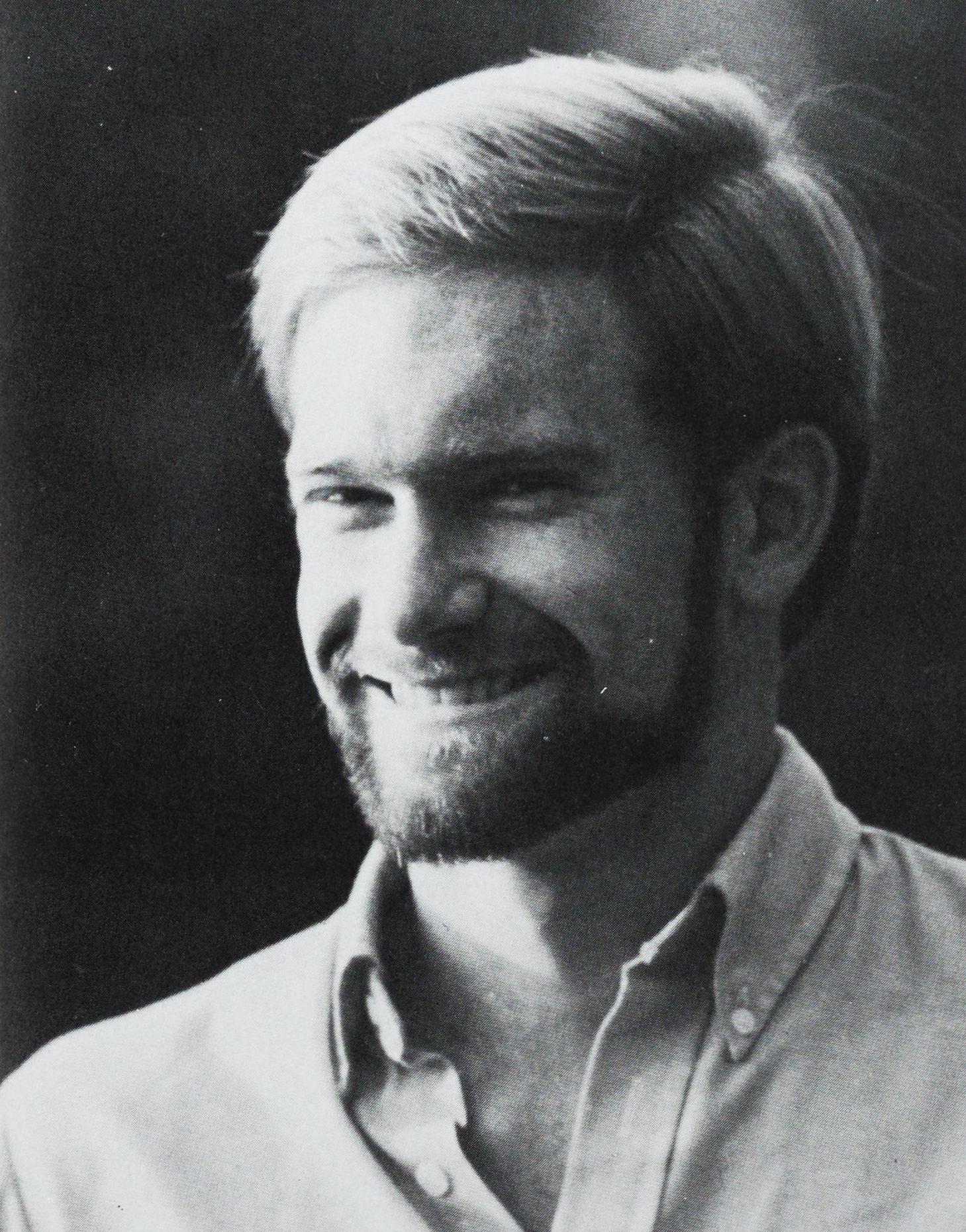
Coons in the Amherst College yearbook, 1985

Coons graduated from the private Tower Hill School in Wilmington, Delaware. He then attended Amherst College, where he was a member of Delta Kappa Epsilon fraternity (Sigma chapter) and a U.S. Senate intern. In 1983, Coons was awarded a Truman Scholarship. During his junior year of college, he studied at the University of Nairobi in Kenya through St. Lawrence University's Kenya Semester Program. He graduated from Amherst College in 1985 with a Bachelor of Arts in chemistry and political science.

In 1992, he earned a master's degree in ethics from Yale Divinity School and a J.D. degree from Yale Law School. In 2018, Delaware State University awarded Coons an honorary doctorate in humane letters.

== Professional career ==
After college, Coons worked in Washington, D.C., for the Investor Responsibility Research Center, where he wrote a book on South Africa and the U.S. divestment movement. He then worked as a volunteer for the South African Council of Churches and as a relief worker in Kenya, before returning to the U.S. to work for the National Coalition for the Homeless in New York.

Coons clerked for Judge Jane Richards Roth on the United States Court of Appeals for the Third Circuit, and then worked for the National "I Have a Dream" Foundation in New York. After returning to Delaware in 1996, Coons began his eight-year career as in-house counsel for W.L. Gore & Associates, Inc., Newark, Delaware-based makers of Gore-Tex fabrics and other high-tech materials. There he was responsible for the ethics training program, federal government relations, e-commerce legal work, and for general commercial contracting.

He has also worked for several nonprofits, including the Coalition for the Homeless, the education-oriented "I Have a Dream" Foundation, and the South African Council of Churches. Coons has served on several boards including First State Innovation, the Bear/Glasgow Boys & Girls Club, and the Delaware College of Art & Design.

Coons is on the Board of Selectors of Jefferson Awards for Public Service.

== Early political career ==
Coons first became involved in politics working on behalf of Republican politicians. As a 17-year-old, in 1980, he independently campaigned for Ronald Reagan's presidential run. He also worked on Bill Roth's U.S. Senate campaign in 1982. During college, he switched from being a Republican to a Democrat and in 1988, Coons became the issues director for the U.S. Senate campaign of Democratic Delaware Lieutenant Governor S. B. Woo. He was a delegate from Wilmington to the 1996 Democratic National Convention in Chicago. He also interned in the Senate office of Joe Biden, whose seat he would later hold in the Senate.

Coons was first elected to office in 2000, as president of the New Castle County Council. He served four years before being elected county executive in 2004. He was the New Castle County Democratic Party's endorsed candidate in 2008 and re-nominated by the party on September 9, 2008. Coons was reelected on November 4, 2008, unopposed in the general election. In his six years in office as county executive, Coons balanced the budget with a surplus in fiscal year 2010 by cutting spending and raising taxes. As New Castle county executive, Coons raised taxes despite having campaigned on a promise not to increase them. New Castle County maintained a AAA bond rating throughout his tenure.

== U.S. Senate ==
=== Elections ===
==== 2010 ====
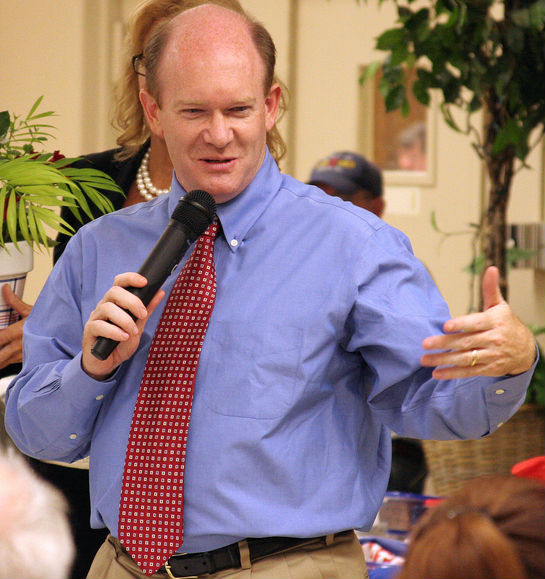
Coons on the campaign trail, 2010

Coons ran in the 2010 special election for the U.S. Senate seat then held by Democrat Ted Kaufman, who was appointed after Joe Biden resigned to take office as vice president. Kaufman had been appointed as a placeholder, and did not run in the special election. Coons was unopposed in the Democratic primary, and expected to face Republican Congressman and former Governor Mike Castle in the general election. Coons was considered a decided underdog due to Castle's moderate profile and longstanding popularity in the state, but the dynamics of the race significantly altered when Christine O'Donnell, a Tea Party Republican who had lost to Biden in 2008 and who was strongly opposed by the GOP establishment, upset Castle in the Republican primary.

In the first post-primary polls, Rasmussen Reports showed Coons with a double-digit lead over O'Donnell, describing this as a "remarkable turnaround" given that the race had leaned Republican before O'Donnell's primary victory. In the first week of October, Fairleigh Dickinson University's PublicMind Poll showed Coons with a 17-point lead, 53%–36%, over O'Donnell, and that 85% of self-identified Democratic voters had united behind Coons, while only 68% of Republican voters endorsed O'Donnell. Days before the election, a second Fairleigh Dickinson poll showed Coons leading 57% to 36% among likely voters, and 72% to 20% among voters who described themselves as moderates. As polls closed at 8 p.m. Eastern Standard Time, multiple news sources announced that Coons had defeated O'Donnell based on exit poll data. Final results gave Coons close to a 17-point margin over O'Donnell, with 56.6% of the vote to her 40%.

During the campaign, Coons became embroiled in controversy over an article he wrote in 1985 for his college newspaper: "Chris Coons: The Making of a Bearded Marxist". In it, he described how, on a college trip to Kenya, hearing wealthy Africans disparaging their country's poor while studying under a "bright and eloquent Marxist professor" at the University of Nairobi helped transform him from a Republican to what Fox News called a "Democrat suspicious of America's power and ideals". Coons campaign spokesman Dave Hoffman said the article's title was a humorous takeoff on a joke Coons's college friends had made about how his time outside the country had affected his outlook. "After witnessing crushing poverty and the consequences of the Reagan Administration's 'constructive engagement' with the South African apartheid regime, he rethought his political views, returned to the America he loved and proudly registered as a Democrat", Hoffman said in a statement to Politico.

According to Fox News, Coons was "targeted by Republicans" over the 25-year-old piece, and then-Senate-Majority-Leader Harry Reid's attempt to defend Coons by calling him "my pet" might have done more harm than good. Coons downplayed the article, as well as controversial past statements by O'Donnell, saying that voters were interested in current issues such as job creation and the national debt and not "statements that either of us made 20 or 30 years ago". Writing in Slate, David Weigel called Coons "boring" and noted that his campaign ads failed to identify him as a Democrat, but opined, "If the Tea Party Express slings the 'bearded Marxist' nonsense, I doubt it will work."

O'Donnell also attracted significant controversy; she embellished her academic record on several occasions, and after comedian Bill Maher aired a video clip of her admitting that she had "dabbled in witchcraft" while in high school, her campaign aired a widely mocked television ad that began with her saying "I am not a witch."

==== 2014 ====
Coons was elected to his first full term by defeating Republican challenger Kevin Wade and Green Party candidate Andrew Groff on November 4, 2014. Wade, an engineer and businessman, also ran against U.S. Senator Tom Carper in 2012. Coons won 55.8% of the popular vote (130,655 to Wade's 98,823 and to Groff's 4,560).

==== 2020 ====
In the 2020 Democratic primary election, Coons easily defeated technology executive Jessica Scarane, a progressive challenger endorsed by groups like Brand New Congress. In the general election, Coons faced Republican nominee Lauren Witzke, a controversial conservative activist and conspiracy theorist calling for a ten-year immigration moratorium. Coons and Witzke took part in a digital debate hosted by the Jewish Federation of Delaware, in which they debated the merits of late Supreme Court Justice Ruth Bader Ginsburg and the Black Lives Matter movement, as well as Witzke's comments about the QAnon conspiracy theory. In the November general election, Coons defeated Witzke, 59% to 38%.

=== Tenure ===
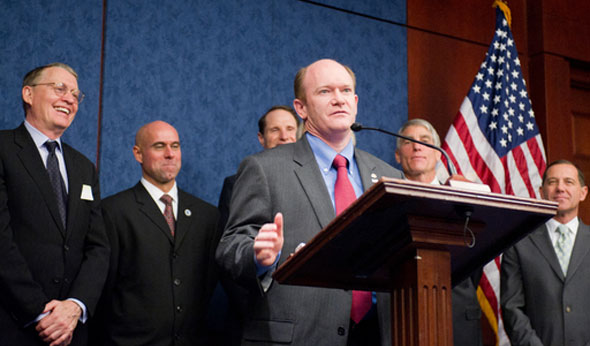
Senator Coons holding a press conference

==== 2010s ====
On November 15, 2010, Coons was sworn in as Delaware's newest senator by Vice President Joe Biden, the former occupant of Coons's Senate seat. Joe Manchin of West Virginia was sworn in on the same day, though he took an advantage in seniority over Coons, as the former governor of West Virginia.

The Affordable Care Act (commonly called Obamacare) had already been passed when Coons took office, but he has voted against repealing it, emphasizing that seniors in Delaware would have to pay higher prescription drug prices if it was repealed. In September 2017, Coons said the Graham-Cassidy bill, meant to replace the Affordable Care Act, would be playing "Russian roulette with the American health care system."

On abortion, Coons has received a 100% rating from the Planned Parenthood Action Fund and a 0% rating from the National Right to Life Committee.

In June 2013, after the death of Democratic senator Frank Lautenberg of New Jersey, Coons was appointed to his seat on the influential Appropriations Committee, becoming the first senator from Delaware to serve on the committee in 40 years. As a result, he gave up his seat on the Committee on Energy and Natural Resources.

In October 2013, Coons announced the formation of the inaugural Senate Chicken Caucus in the United States Senate. He stated, "I hope that the Senate Chicken Caucus will give America's chicken producers a platform to better inform legislators about the industry's vital contributions to our economy, and promote policy solutions that help their businesses grow and thrive."

On December 11, 2013, Coons introduced the Victims of Child Abuse Act Reauthorization Act of 2013 (S. 1799; 113th Congress), a bill that would reauthorize the Victims of Child Abuse Act of 1990 and would authorize funding through 2018 to help child abuse victims. Coons said that "we have a responsibility to protect our children from violence and abuse."

In March 2014, Coons voted against President Obama's nomination of civil rights lawyer Debo Adegbile for Assistant Attorney General for Civil Rights, even though he believed that Adegbile would have been "an asset to the Justice Department." He stated that voting for a nominee "who would face such visceral opposition from law enforcement on his first day on the job" was troubling and the vote was "one of the most difficult I have taken since joining the Senate". Obama described the Senate's vote against Adegbile as "a travesty based on wildly unfair character attacks against a good and qualified public servant." An open letter to Coons from students, faculty and alumni of the Yale Law and Divinity Schools, of which Coons is an alumnus, criticized his vote as "alarm[ing]" and "signal[ing] a lack of respect for the fundamental American legal principle that all parties have a right to zealous representation."

Coons was mentioned as a possible replacement for the late Justice Antonin Scalia in February 2016.

In April 2017, after President Trump tweeted that North Korea had "disrespected the wishes of China & its highly respected President" with a recent missile launch, Coons said Trump understood China was his sole "constructive path forward on North Korea" but that diplomacy would not work through tweeting.

In July 2017, Coons voted in favor of the Countering America's Adversaries Through Sanctions Act that placed sanctions on Iran together with Russia and North Korea.

In April 2018, following the FBI raid on the hotel room and offices of Trump's personal attorney, Michael Cohen, Coons, Cory Booker, Lindsey Graham, and Thom Tillis introduced new legislation to "limit President Trump's ability to fire special counsel Robert Mueller". Termed the Special Counsel Independence and Integrity Act, the legislation would allow any special counsel, in this case Mueller, to receive an "expedited judicial review" in the 10 days following being dismissed to determine whether the dismissal was appropriate. If not, the special counsel would be reinstated. At the same time, according to The Hill, the bill would "codify regulations" that a special counsel could be fired only by a senior Justice Department official, while having to provide reasons in writing.

==== 2020s ====
In November 2020, Coons was named a candidate for Secretary of State in the Biden administration. Biden ultimately chose Antony Blinken to lead the State Department, telling Coons, "I need you in the Senate." Coons was seen as among Biden's closest allies in the Senate, and co-chaired Biden's 2024 reelection campaign.

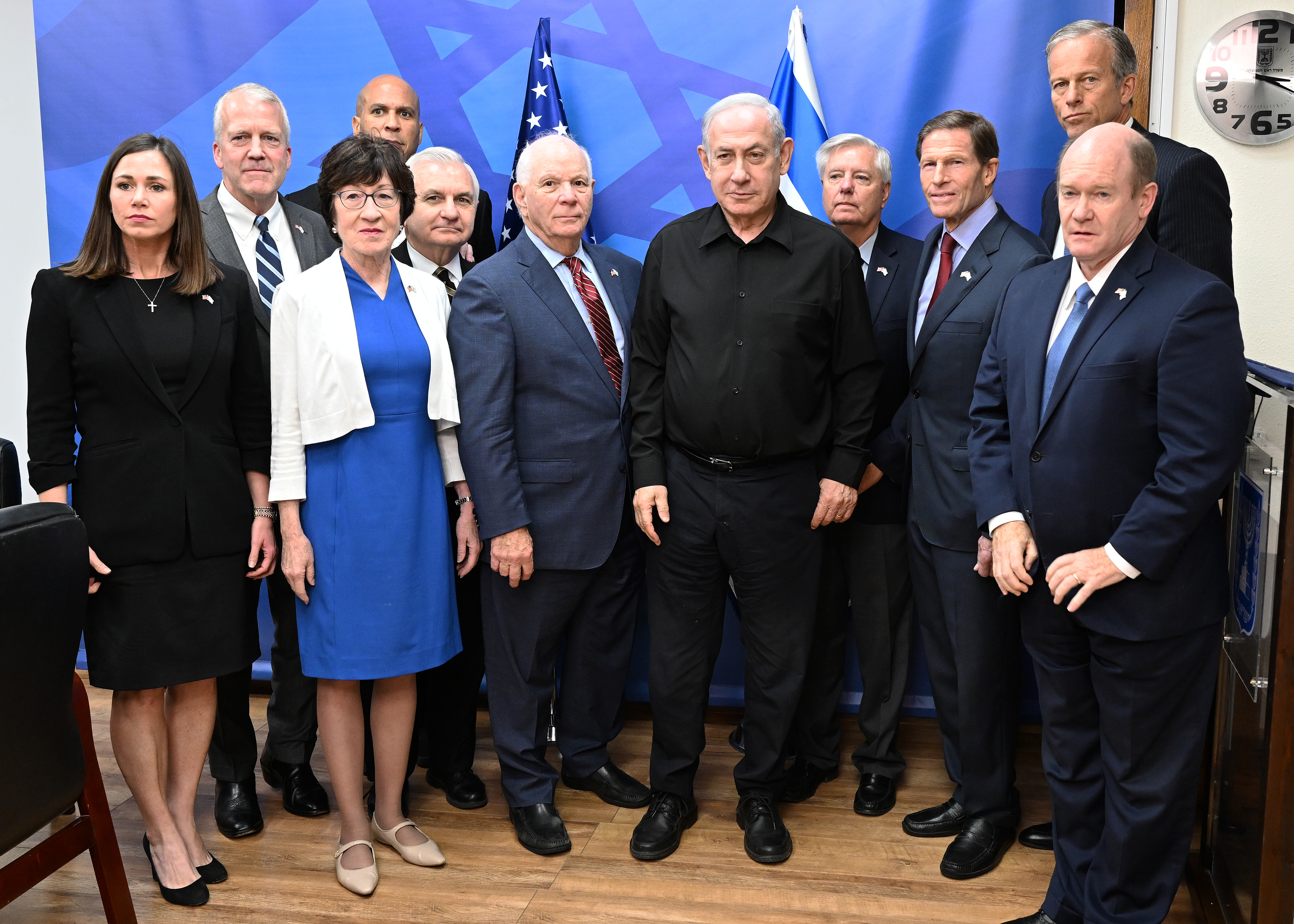
Coons with Israeli Prime Minister Benjamin Netanyahu, Israel, October 22, 2023

During the 2021 attack on the United States Capitol, Coons was evacuated from the Senate chambers, along with other senators and staff. He said there were "some scary and chaotic moments" during the attack. When the Senate reconvened to certify the Electoral College vote count, Coons called for Trump's removal, saying he "poses a real and present threat to the future of our democracy". He called for the invocation of the Twenty-Fifth Amendment to the United States Constitution the day after the event on Good Morning America. That same day, January 7, he called for Republicans Josh Hawley and Ted Cruz, who both challenged the election results, to resign from the Senate.

==== Arctic Frost investigation ====
In November 2025, following disclosures that the FBI's Arctic Frost investigation had obtained phone records of Republican senators without notification, Coons expressed concern about the surveillance of legislators, saying, "On the surface of it, it would strike me as a significant invasion of the right of senators to conduct their jobs, so this is something that needs urgent follow-up." Coons also co-sponsored the Anti-Cash Grab Act, legislation introduced by Senators Martin Heinrich and Mark Kelly to repeal a provision in the government funding bill that allowed senators to sue for $500,000 in damages over seized phone records.

==== Conservative Shift on Third Circuit ====
Coons, Senator Tom Carper, and President Biden declined to select a nominee for a judicial vacancy on the Third Circuit in Biden's home state of Delaware even though the vacancy was announced in May 2024, more than eight months before Biden's term in office ended. The White House's and the Delaware U.S. Senate delegation's decision not to fill the vacancy, along with Biden's unsuccessful nomination of Adeel A. Mangi to another Third Circuit vacancy, allowed President Trump to fill both seats in 2025 and give the Third Circuit a conservative majority. Trump nominated Jennifer Mascott, who had never taken the Delaware bar exam and was not licensed to practice law in Delaware.

=== Committee assignments ===
- Select Committee on Ethics (Ranking Member)
- Committee on Appropriations
  - Subcommittee on Commerce, Justice, Science, and Related Agencies
  - Subcommittee on Energy and Water Development
  - Subcommittee on Financial Services and General Government
  - Subcommittee on Military Construction and Veterans Affairs, and Related Agencies
  - Subcommittee on the Department of State, Foreign Operations, and Related Programs (chair)
  - Subcommittee on Transportation, Housing and Urban Development, and Related Agencies
- Committee on Foreign Relations
  - Subcommittee on Africa and Global Health Policy
  - Subcommittee on East Asia, The Pacific, and International Cybersecurity Policy
  - Subcommittee on United States Senate Foreign Relations Subcommittee on Multilateral International Development, Multilateral Institutions, and International Economic, Energy and Environmental Policy
  - Subcommittee on State Department and USAID Management, International Operations, and Bilateral International Development
- Committee on the Judiciary
  - Subcommittee on Competition Policy, Antitrust, and Consumer Rights
  - Subcommittee on Criminal Justice and Counterterrorism
  - Subcommittee on Immigration, Citizenship and Border Safety
  - Subcommittee on Intellectual Property (chair)
  - Subcommittee on Privacy, Technology and the Law
- Committee on Small Business and Entrepreneurship

Previous (2010–2015)

- Committee on the Budget
- Committee on Energy and Natural Resources

=== Caucus memberships ===
- Senate Law Enforcement Caucus (co-chair)
- Senate Climate Solutions Caucus (co-chair)
- Senate Competitiveness Caucus (co-chair)
- Senate Chicken Caucus (co-chair)
- Senate Human Rights Caucus (co-chair)
- Congressional Trademark Caucus (co-chair)
- Senate Fuel Cell and Hydrogen Caucus (co-chair)
- Senate Caucus on Malaria and Neglected Tropical Diseases (co-chair)
- Senate Oceans Caucus
- Senate Manufacturing Caucus
- Rare Disease Caucus
- Senate Renewables and Energy Efficiency Caucus
- Congressional International Creativity and Theft-Prevention Caucus
- Congressional Bipartisan HBCU Caucus
- Senate National Guard Caucus
- Senate Small Brewers Caucus
- Congressional Bicameral High-Speed & Intercity Passenger Rail Caucus
- Senate Diabetes Caucus
- Senate Global Internet Freedom Caucus
- Senate India Caucus
- Congressional French Caucus
- Cloud Task Force, Congressional High Tech Caucus
- Bicameral Congressional AIDS Caucus
- Senate Veterans Jobs Caucus
- Senate Air Force Caucus
- Senate Recycling Caucus
- National Service Congressional Caucus
- Congressional Inventions Caucus
- Afterschool Caucuses
- Congressional Coalition on Adoption

== Political positions ==
The American Conservative Union gave Coons a 3% lifetime conservative rating in 2020. Coons has been described as a pro-Israel centrist.

=== Abortion ===
Coons supported Roe v. Wade and believes abortion should remain legal throughout the country. In 2015, he signed an amicus brief to the Supreme Court in Whole Woman's Health v. Hellerstedt that urged the Court to step in to prevent states from enacting laws that restrict access to abortion. Coons described the June 2022 overturning of Roe v. Wade as taking away "the fundamental freedom for women to make their own choices about their body and their future."

=== Agriculture ===
In June 2019, Coons and 18 other Democratic senators sent USDA Inspector General Phyllis K. Fong a letter requesting that she investigate USDA instances of retaliation and political decision-making and asserting that not to conduct an investigation would mean these "actions could be perceived as a part of this administration's broader pattern of not only discounting the value of federal employees, but suppressing, undermining, discounting, and wholesale ignoring scientific data produced by their own qualified scientists."

=== Environment ===
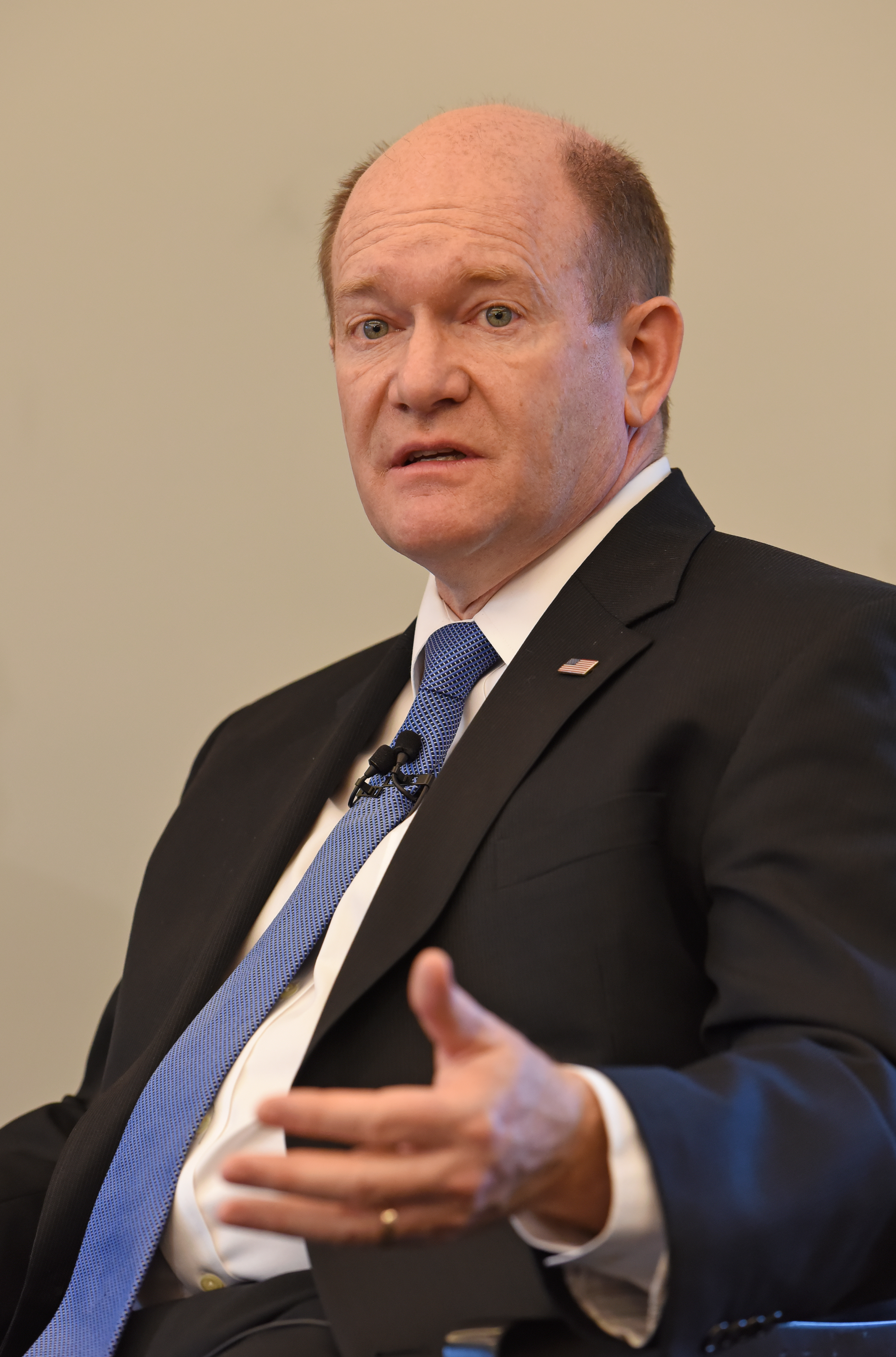
Coons in 2017

In April 2019, Coons was one of 12 senators to sign a bipartisan letter to top senators on the Appropriations Subcommittee on Energy and Water Development advocating that the Energy Department be granted maximum funding for carbon capture, use and storage (CCUS), arguing that investment in viable options to capture carbon emissions could stimulate American job growth and expressing disagreement with Trump's 2020 budget request to combine the two federal programs that include carbon capture research. Coons was revealed in a sting operation by Greenpeace to be a target for ExxonMobil in efforts to weaken the climate regulations in President Biden's INVEST in America Act. In June 2023, Coons was the primary sponsor of the PROVE IT Act, which would direct the Department of Energy to collect data on the greenhouse gas intensity of certain goods made in the United States and other countries, data that could enable climate-focused trade policy addressing international disparities in environmental standards. He was joined by lead Republican sponsor Kevin Cramer.

=== Gun law ===
As of 2010, Coons had a "F" grade from the National Rifle Association (NRA) due to his stance on gun control. In 2015, he and 23 other Democratic senators signed a letter to Obama asking him to take executive action on gun control in the wake of the Umpqua Community College shooting. Coons supported the Feinstein Amendment, which sought to ban known and suspected terrorists from buying firearms. The next year, he participated in the Chris Murphy gun control filibuster.

=== Foreign policy ===
In December 2010, Coons voted for the ratification of New START, a nuclear arms reduction treaty between the United States and Russian Federation obliging both countries to have no more than 1,550 strategic warheads as well as 700 launchers deployed during the next seven years along with providing a continuation of on-site inspections that halted when START I expired the previous year. It was the first arms treaty with Russia in eight years.

Coons is a member of the Senate Foreign Relations committee and is a staunch supporter of Israel. He has also been a guest speaker at AIPAC events. Coons is also a co-sponsor of a Senate resolution expressing objection to the UN Security Council Resolution 2334 because it undermines direct talks between the parties.

Coons condemned the genocide of the Rohingya Muslim minority in Myanmar and called for a stronger response to the crisis.

In October 2018, Coons was one of seven senators to sign a letter to United States Secretary of State Mike Pompeo expressing that they found it "difficult to reconcile known facts with at least two" of the Trump administration's certifications that Saudi Arabia and the United Arab Emirates were attempting to protect Yemeni civilians and were in compliance with US laws on arms sales, citing their lack of understanding for "a certification that the Saudi and Emirati governments are complying with applicable agreements and laws regulating defense articles when the [memo] explicitly states that, in certain instances, they have not done so."

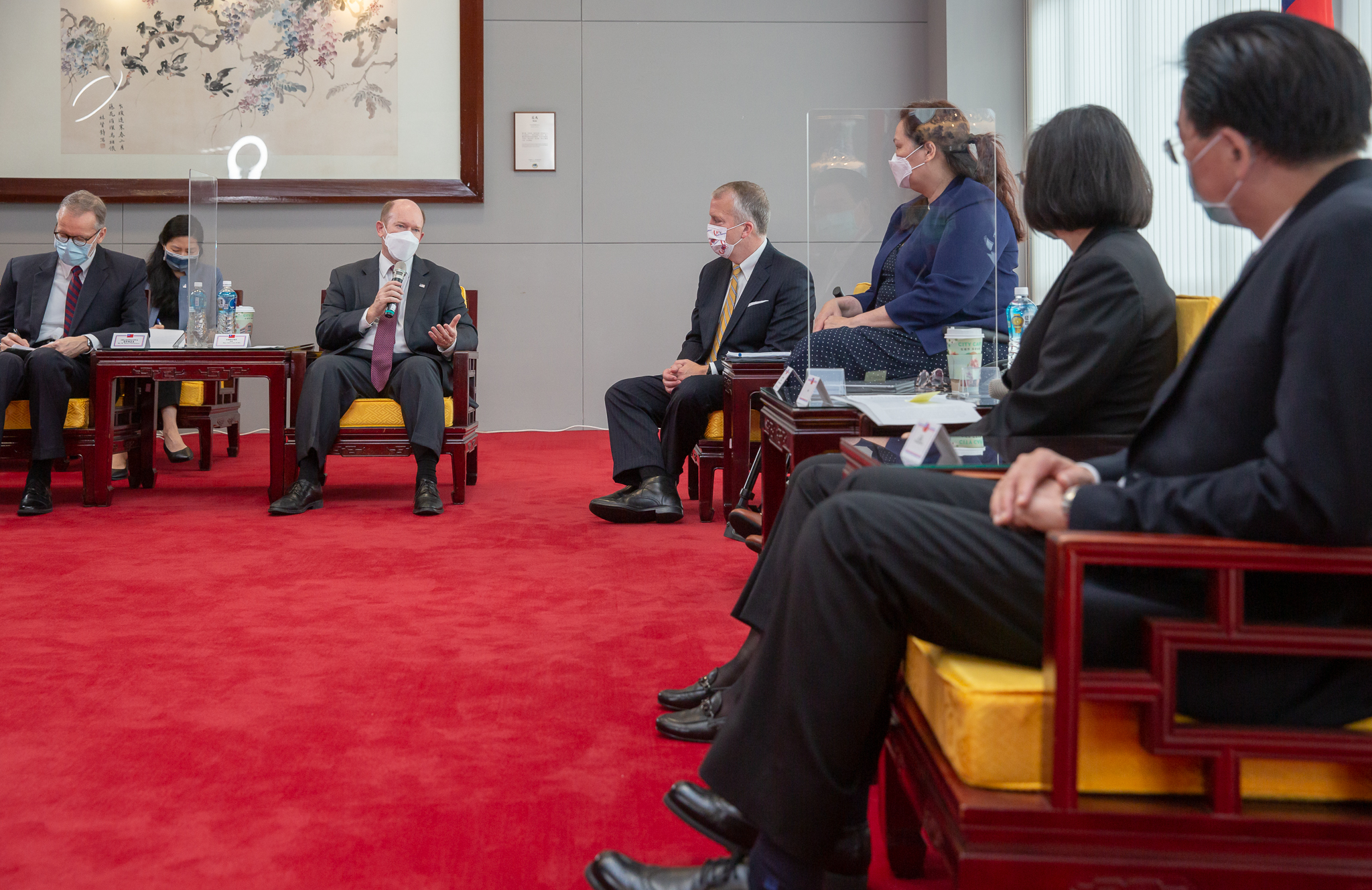
Coons with Taiwanese President Tsai Ing-wen on June 6, 2021

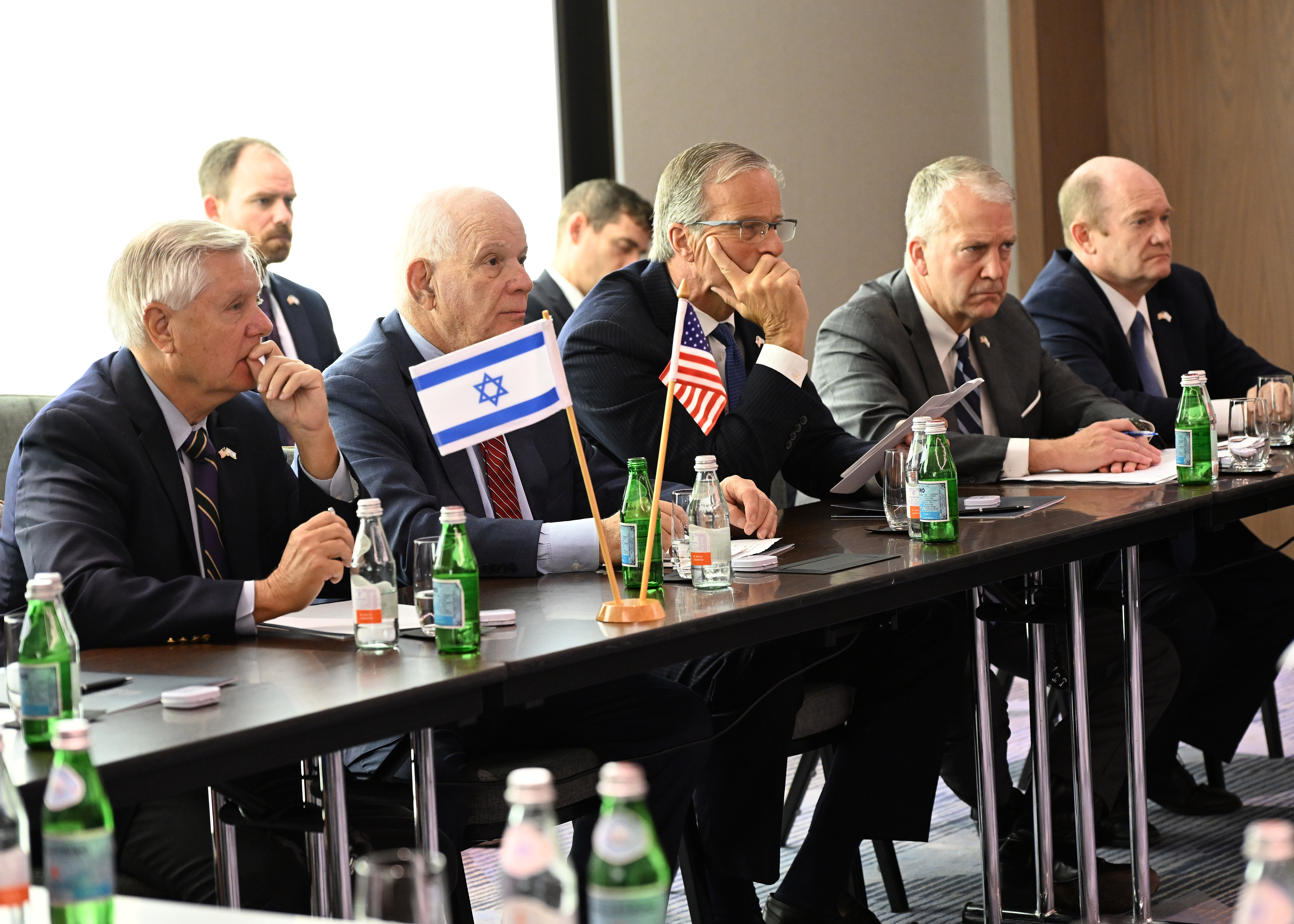
Coons in Israel on October 22, 2023

In November 2018, Coons joined Senator Marco Rubio and a bipartisan group of lawmakers in sending the Trump administration a letter raising concerns about China's undue influence over media outlets and academic institutions in the United States. They wrote, "In American news outlets, Beijing has used financial ties to suppress negative information about the CCP. In the past four years, multiple media outlets with direct or indirect financial ties to China allegedly decided not to publish stories on wealth and corruption in the CCP...Beijing has also sought to use relationships with American academic institutions and student groups to shape public discourse."

In April 2019, Coons was one of 34 senators to sign a letter to Trump encouraging him "to listen to members of your own Administration and reverse a decision that will damage our national security and aggravate conditions inside Central America", asserting that Trump had "consistently expressed a flawed understanding of U.S. foreign assistance" since becoming president and that he was "personally undermining efforts to promote U.S. national security and economic prosperity" by preventing the use of Fiscal Year 2018 national security funding. The senators argued that foreign assistance to Central American countries created less migration to the U.S., arguing that the funding improved conditions in those countries.

On June 6, 2021, Coons and Senators Tammy Duckworth and Dan Sullivan visited Taipei in an U.S. Air Force C-17 Globemaster III transport to meet President Tsai Ing-wen and Minister Joseph Wu during the pandemic outbreak of Taiwan to announce President Joe Biden's donation plan of 750,000 COVID-19 vaccines included in the global COVAX program.

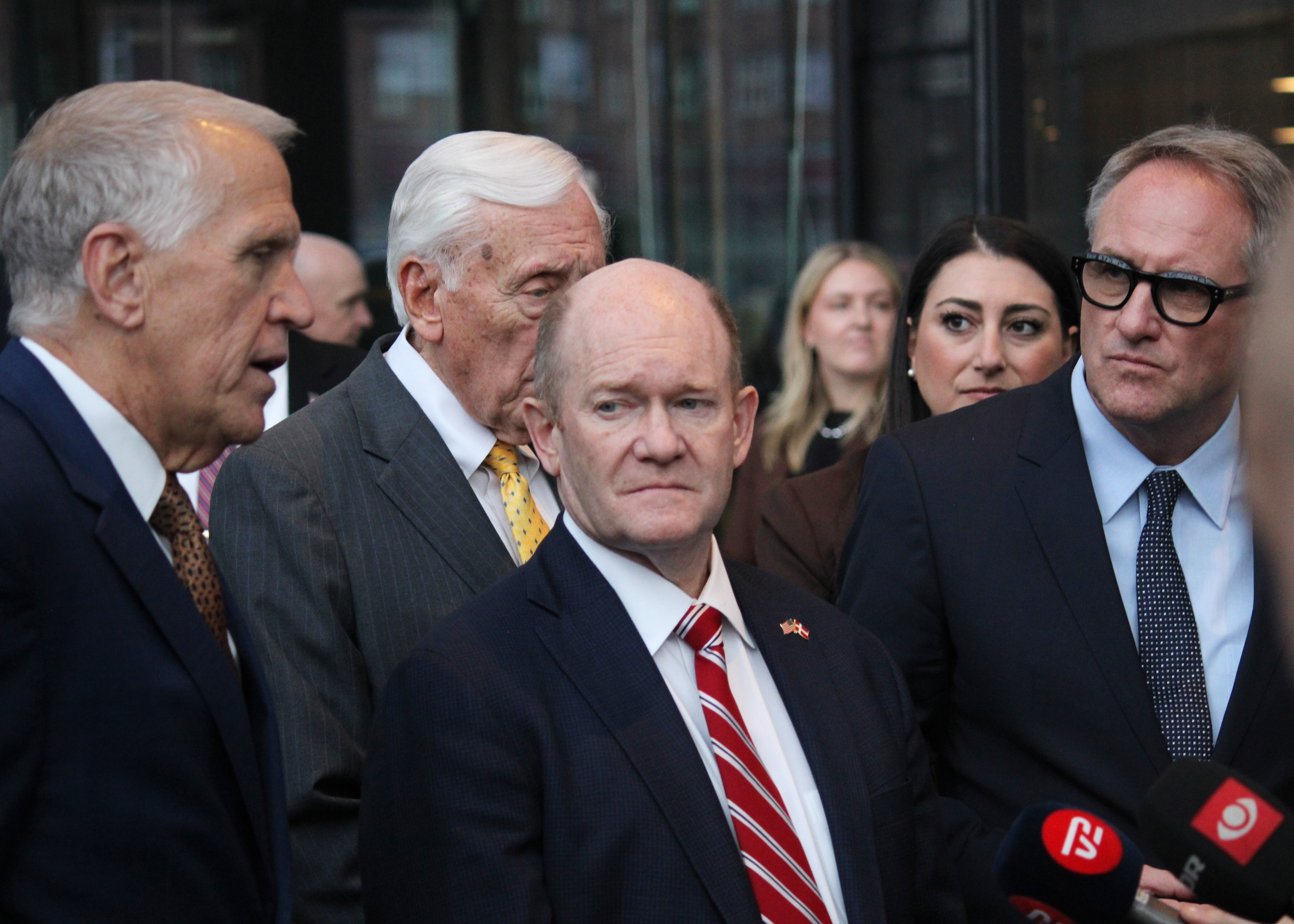
Coons speaking with Danish media at Industriens Hus in Copenhagen

In January 2024, Coons opposed a resolution proposed by Senator Bernie Sanders that would have applied the human rights provisions of the Foreign Assistance Act to U.S. military aid to Israel. The proposal was defeated, 72 to 11. In March 2024, Coons urged the Biden administration to recognize a "nonmilitarized" Palestinian state after the end of the Gaza war. In January 2026, Coons led a bipartisan congressional delegation to Copenhagen, Denmark in support of the country during the Greenland crisis.

In April 2026, Coons posted on the social media platform X that the war's financial impact extends far beyond fuel costs, with everyday expenses for ordinary Americans affected by economic hardships. "It's more than just gas", he wrote. "Everything from food to utilities to mortgages is part of it." Coons emphasized that American families, especially those already struggling with economic uncertainty and inflation, are bearing the brunt of the burden. He called the war with Iran a "war of choice", implying that it was an avoidable decision. He warned that disruptions in global energy markets are a prime example of how prolonged military actions abroad can drive up prices at home. That month, Coons was one of seven Democratic senators to join all Republicans in opposing a pair of resolutions that would have blocked sales of bulldozers and 1,000-pound bombs to Israel, saying he did not want to "abandon" Israel while reiterating opposition to the war on Iran.

=== Fiscal position ===
Coons supports free-trade agreements. He opposed the Obama-era government bailouts. He is against right-to-work laws, and supports internet sales tax.

=== Housing ===
In April 2019, Coons was one of 41 senators to sign a bipartisan letter to the housing subcommittee praising the Housing and Urban Development Department's Section 4 Capacity Building program for authorizing "HUD to partner with national nonprofit community development organizations to provide education, training, and financial support to local community development corporations (CDCs) across the country" and expressing disappointment that Trump's budget "has slated this program for elimination after decades of successful economic and community development." The senators wrote of their hope that the subcommittee would support continued funding for Section 4 in Fiscal Year 2020.

=== Labor ===
In May 2018, Coons was one of 12 senators to sign a letter to Federal Labor Relations Authority (FLRA) Chairman Colleen Kiko urging the FLRA to end efforts to close its Boston regional office until Congress debated the matter, adding that closing the FLRA's seven regional offices would cause staff to be placed farther away from the federal employees whose rights they protect.

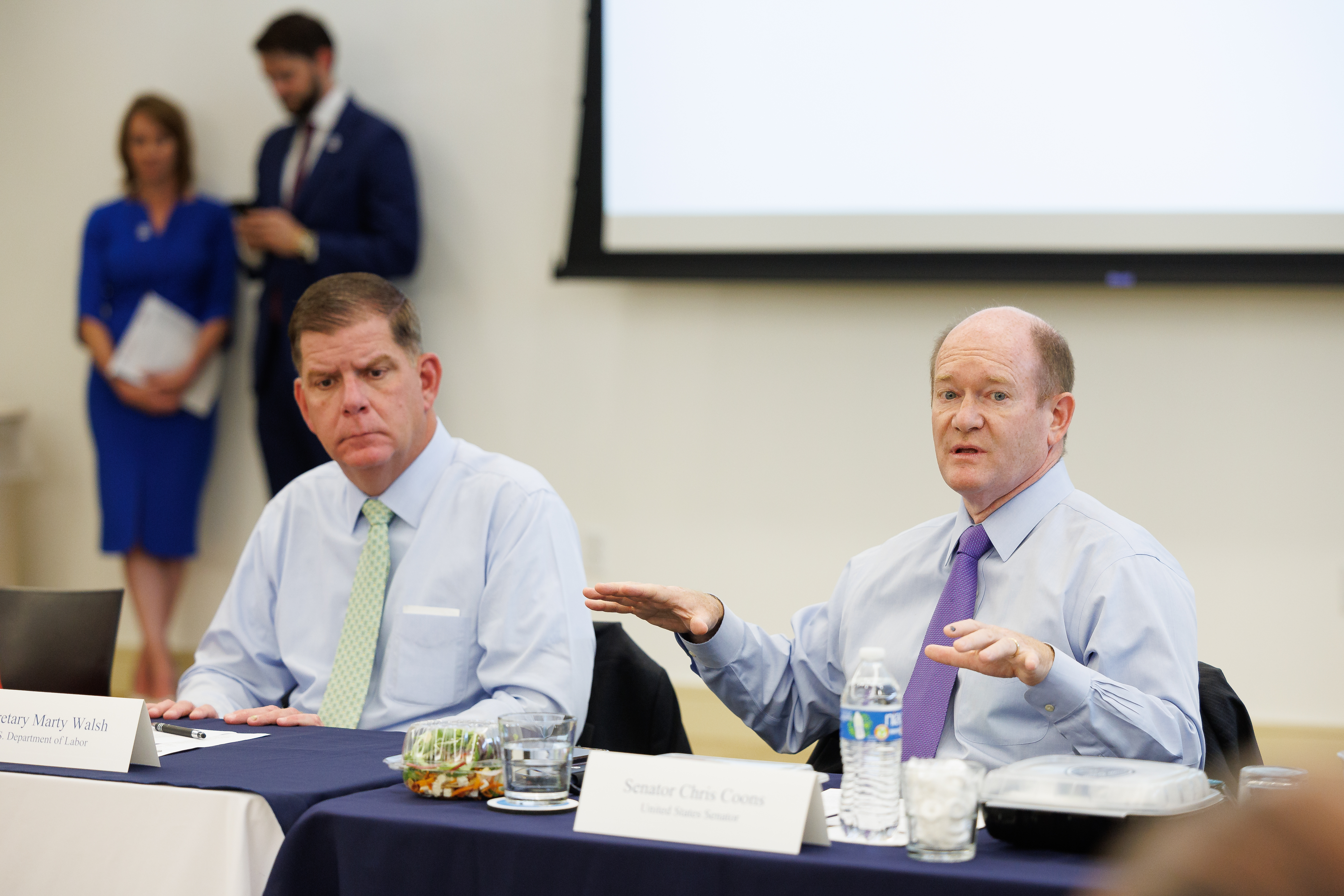
Coons (right) with then Labor Secretary, Marty Walsh (left)

On March 5, 2021, Coons voted against Bernie Sanders's amendment to include a $15/hour minimum wage in the American Rescue Plan Act of 2021.

In March 2023, Coons co-sponsored the introduction of the PRO Act in the 118th Congress.

=== LGBT rights ===
In September 2014, Coons was one of 69 members of the House and Senate to sign a letter to Health and Human Services Secretary Sylvia Burwell requesting that the Food and Drug Administration (FDA) shall revise its policy banning donation of corneas and other tissues by men who have had sex with another man in the preceding five years.

In October 2018, Coons was one of 20 senators to sign a letter to Secretary of State Mike Pompeo urging him to reverse the rollback of a policy that granted visas to same-sex partners of LGBTQIA+ diplomats who had unions that are not recognized by their home countries, writing that too many places around the world have seen LGBTQIA+ individuals "subjected to discrimination and unspeakable violence, and receive little or no protection from the law or local authorities" and that refusing to let LGBTQIA+ diplomats bring their partners to the US would be equivalent to upholding "the discriminatory policies of many countries around the world." Coons supports transgender rights.

=== Patents ===
Coons proposed the Stronger Patents Act, which would make it more expensive to challenge patents and thus easier to enforce them.

== Publications ==
=== Articles ===
- "A Bipartisan Foreign Policy Is Still Possible", Foreign Affairs, October 7, 2020
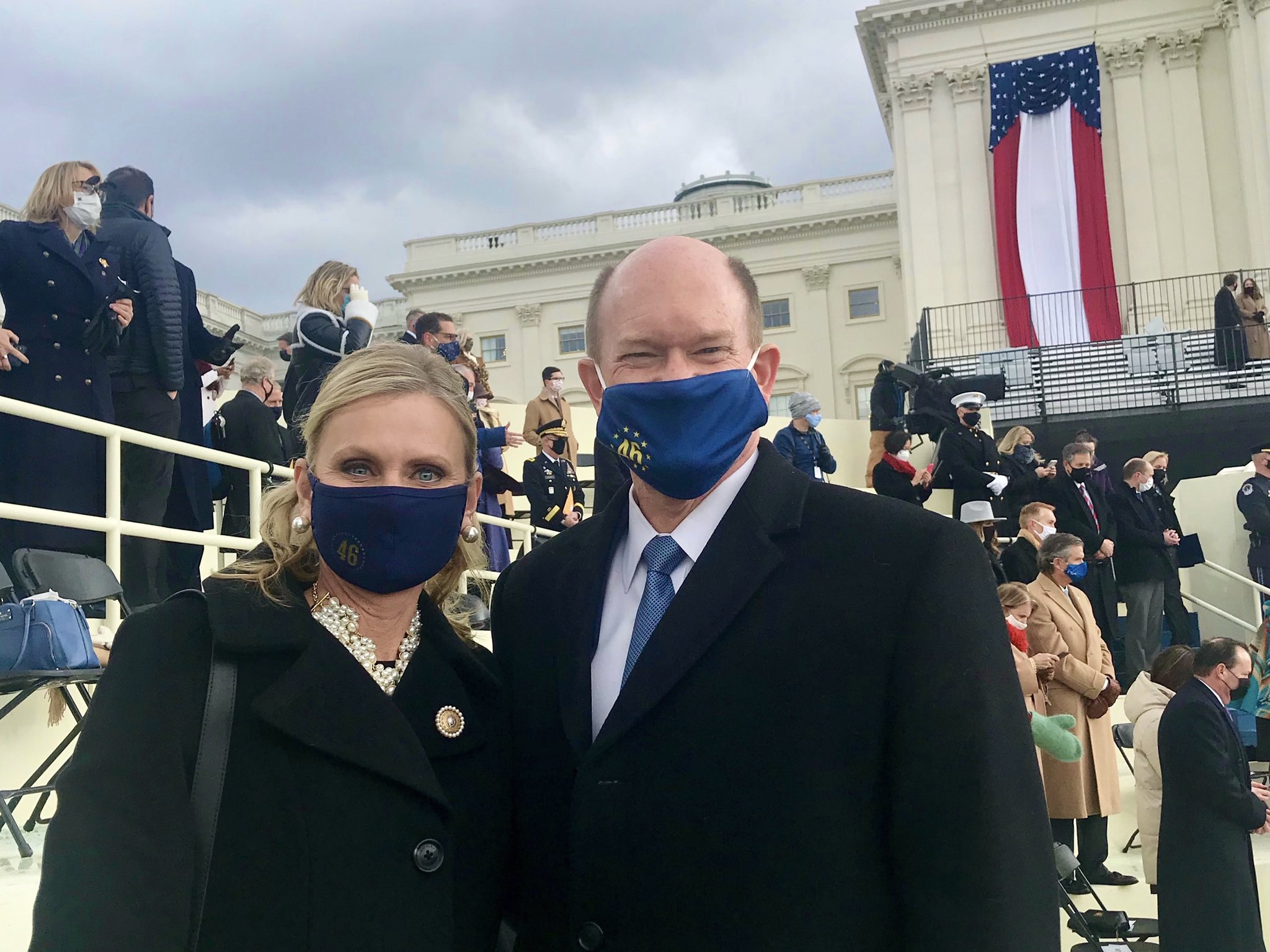
  Annie and Chris Coons at the inauguration of Joe Biden in 2021

== Personal life ==
Coons is married to Annie Coons, née Lingenfelter. They have three children, twins Mike and Jack, and daughter Maggie, and they live in Wilmington, Delaware. Coons is Presbyterian, his wife is Catholic, and they attend St. Ann Catholic Church in the city. Coons describes himself as "someone who is, privately, fairly religious," though he has never thought "that needs to be a big part of [campaigning]."

In 1999, he was awarded the Governor's Outstanding Volunteer Award for his work with the "I Have a Dream" Foundation, the Governor's Mentoring Council, and the United Way of Delaware.

As of 2018, according to OpenSecrets.org, Coons's net worth was more than $10 million.

Coons bears a striking resemblance to former German Chancellor Olaf Scholz, which the two referenced when posing for a selfie together in February 2024 with the caption "Wer ist wer" (German for "who is who").

On June 28, 2026, Coons was in a car accident, but suffered only minor injuries.

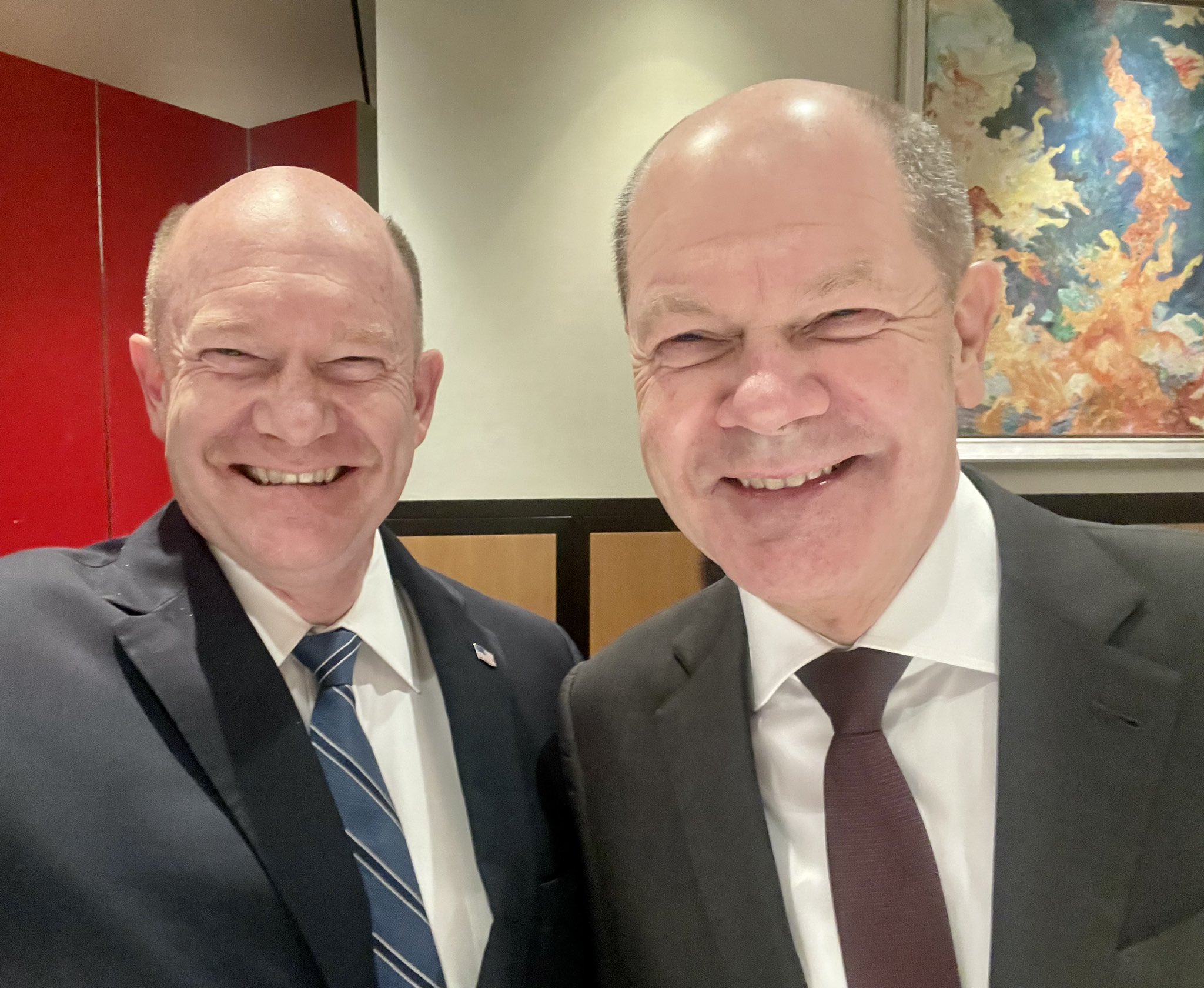
A selfie of Chris Coons (left) and German Chancellor Olaf Scholz, 2024

== Electoral history ==
New Castle County Council election, 2000: At-large District
Primary election
| Party | Candidate | Votes | % |
|---|---|---|---|
| Democratic | Christopher Coons | 7,520 | 48.44 |
| Democratic | Vincent D'Anna | 3,220 | 20.74 |
| Democratic | Martha Denison | 2,414 | 15.55 |
| Democratic | Dwight Davis | 2,370 | 15.27 |
| Total votes | | 15,524 | 100 |
General election
| Democratic | Christopher Coons | 113,050 | 56.38 |
| Republican | Michael Ramone | 87,462 | 43.62 |
| Total votes | | 200,512 | 100 |
| Democratic hold | | | |

New Castle County Executive election, 2004
Primary election
| Party | Candidate | Votes | % |
|---|---|---|---|
| Democratic | Christopher Coons | 17,584 | 66.57 |
| Democratic | Sherry Freebery | 4,702 | 17.80 |
| Democratic | Richard Korn | 4,130 | 15.63 |
| Total votes | | 26,416 | 100 |
General election
| Democratic | Christopher Coons | 131,397 | 58.45 |
| Republican | Christopher Castagno | 93,424 | 41.55 |
| Total votes | | 224,821 | 100 |
| Democratic hold | | | |

New Castle County Executive election, 2008
Primary election
| Party | Candidate | Votes | % |
|---|---|---|---|
| Democratic | Christopher Coons (incumbent) | 31,405 | 64.76 |
| Democratic | Thomas Gordon | 17,088 | 35.24 |
| Total votes | | 48,493 | 100 |
General election
| Democratic | Christopher Coons (incumbent) | 194,005 | 100 |
| Total votes | | 194,005 | 100 |
| Democratic hold | | | |

U.S. Senate election, 2010: Delaware Class II
| Party | Candidate | Votes | % |
|---|---|---|---|
| Democratic | Chris Coons | 174,012 | 56.61 |
| Republican | Christine O'Donnell | 123,053 | 40.03 |
| Independent Party | Glenn Miller | 8,201 | 2.67 |
| Libertarian | James Rash | 2,101 | 0.68 |
| Total votes | | 307,367 | 100 |
| Democratic hold | | | |

U.S. Senate election, 2014: Delaware Class II
| Party | Candidate | Votes | % |
|---|---|---|---|
| Democratic | Chris Coons (incumbent) | 130,655 | 55.83 |
| Republican | Kevin Wade | 98,823 | 42.23 |
| Green | Andrew Groff | 4,560 | 1.95 |
| Total votes | | 234,038 | 100 |
| Democratic hold | | | |

U.S. Senate election, 2020: Delaware Class II
Primary election
| Party | Candidate | Votes | % |
|---|---|---|---|
| Democratic | Chris Coons (incumbent) | 87,332 | 72.85 |
| Democratic | Jessica Scarane | 32,547 | 27.15 |
| Total votes | | 119,879 | 100 |
General election
| Democratic | Chris Coons (incumbent) | 291,804 | 59.44 |
| Republican | Lauren Witzke | 186,054 | 37.90 |
| Independent Party | Mark Turley | 7,833 | 1.60 |
| Libertarian | Nadine Frost | 5,244 | 1.07 |
| Total votes | | 490,935 | 100 |
| Democratic hold | | | |

U.S. Senate election, 2026: Delaware Class II
Primary election
| Party | Candidate | Votes | % |
|---|---|---|---|
| Democratic | Chris Coons (incumbent) | 68,154 | 77.99 |
| Democratic | Jeff Appelhans | 9,294 | 10.63 |
| Democratic | Mary Louve | 6,577 | 7.53 |
| Democratic | Eric Hansen | 3,367 | 3.85 |
| Total votes | | 87,392 | 100 |
General election
| Democratic | Chris Coons (incumbent) | 240,587 | 63.35 |
| Republican | Michael Katz | 137,837 | 36.30 |
| Write-in | | 1,330 | 0.35 |
| Total votes | | 379,754 | 100 |
| Democratic hold | | | |

Political offices
| Preceded by Stephanie Hansen | President of the New Castle County Council; 2001–2005 | Succeeded by Paul Clark |
| Preceded by Thomas Gordon | Executive of New Castle County; 2005–2010 | Succeeded by Paul Clark |
Party political offices
| Preceded by Joe Biden | Democratic nominee for U.S. Senator from Delaware (Class 2); 2010, 2014, 2020, 2026 | Most recent |
U.S. Senate
| Preceded by Ted Kaufman | United States Senator (Class 2) from Delaware; 2010–present Served alongside: Tom Carper, Lisa Blunt Rochester | Incumbent |
| Preceded by Barbara Boxer | Ranking Member of the Senate Ethics Committee; 2017–2021 | Succeeded by James Lankford |
| Preceded by James Lankford | Chair of the Senate Ethics Committee; 2021–2025 | Succeeded by James Lankford |
| Preceded by James Lankford | Ranking Member of the Senate Ethics Committee; 2025–present | Incumbent |
U.S. order of precedence (ceremonial)
| Preceded by Kirsten Gillibrand | Order of precedence of the United States as United States Senator | Succeeded by Richard Blumenthal |
| Preceded by Kirsten Gillibrand | United States senators by seniority 25th | Succeeded by Jerry Moran |
