= United States Senate Judiciary Subcommittee on Bankruptcy and the Courts =

US Senate subcommittee of the Senate Judiciary Committee

The Senate Judiciary Subcommittee on Bankruptcy and the Courts was one of seven subcommittees within the Senate Judiciary Committee in the 113th Congress.

== Jurisdiction ==
Jurisdiction: (1) Federal court jurisdiction, administration and management; (2) Rules of evidence and procedure; (3) Creation of new courts and judgeships; (4) Bankruptcy; (5) Legal reform and liability issues; (6) Local courts in territories and possessions.

== Members, 113th Congress ==
Majority	Minority
Chris Coons, Delaware, Chairman; Richard Durbin, Illinois; Sheldon Whitehouse, Rhode Island; Amy Klobuchar, Minnesota; Al Franken, Minnesota	Jeff Sessions, Alabama, Ranking Member; Chuck Grassley, Iowa; Jeff Flake, Arizona; Ted Cruz, Texas

== See also ==
- U.S. House Judiciary Subcommittee on Courts, the Internet, and Intellectual Property
- U.S. House Judiciary Subcommittee on Commercial and Administrative Law
