= National Association of Police Organizations =

American police lobbying group

The National Association of Police Organizations (NAPO) represents police and law enforcement officers, police unions and local police officer associations across the United States. It was founded in 1978. NAPO represents more than 2,000 police units and associations, 241,000 officers, 11,000 retired officers and more than 100,000 others not directly associated with the police. NAPO sponsors the Top Cops award for outstanding achievements by individual police officers.

Bill Johnson is Executive Director.

== Top Cops ==
NAPO receives nominations from fellow police officers, from which awardees for the Top Cops award are selected each year. The awardees are honored with an award dinner. The award ceremony advertises to sponsors as a promotional opportunity with "senior government executives, [...] and key decision makers in the varied fields of law enforcement". Several finance firms, insurance groups and weapons manufacturers are listed as the sponsors of the 2018 dinner.

== Endorsements ==
NAPO endorsed J. D. Hayworth against John McCain in the 2010 Arizona Senate Race.

In July 2020, NAPO endorsed Donald Trump for president.

In July 2024, NAPO once again endorsed Donald Trump for president.

== Legislation ==
NAPO publishes comprehensive booklets on their legislative priorities and official positions that they have taken with respect to bills on Capitol Hill. They also publish a scorecard, summarizing how members of the House and Senate have voted with respect to NAPO's position in each legislative period.

In 2015 the NAPO supported the "Don't Tax Our Fallen Public Safety Heroes Act" (S.322; 114th Congress). In 2013, the NAPO supported the Victims of Child Abuse Act Reauthorization Act of 2013 (S. 1799; 113th Congress), a bill that would reauthorize the Victims of Child Abuse Act of 1990 and would authorize funding through 2018 to help child abuse victims.
