= Special Counsel Independence and Integrity Act =

Proposed US legislation

- Long title: To ensure independent investigations and judicial review of the removal of a special counsel, and for other purposes
- Announced in: the 115th United States Congress
- Sponsored by: Lindsey Graham
- Number of co-sponsors: 3

Legislative history
- Introduced in the Senate as S. 2644 by Lindsey Graham (R–SC) on April 11, 2018; Committee consideration by United States Senate Committee on the Judiciary

The Special Counsel Independence and Integrity Act (S. 2644) is a proposed United States law that would impose restrictions on the firing of a special counsel appointed by the United States Attorney General.

== Provisions ==
According to the Congressional Research Service summary, the bill would mandate that "a special counsel may only be removed by the Attorney General (or the most senior Senate-confirmed Department of Justice official); may only be removed for misconduct, dereliction of duty, incapacity, conflict of interest, or other good cause; must be provided written notice that specifies the reason for removal; and may file an action to challenge the removal not later than 10 days after notice was provided."

== Legislative history ==
=== 115th Congress ===
The bill was sponsored by Senators Cory Booker (D-NJ), Lindsey Graham (R-SC), Chris Coons (D-DE) and Thom Tillis (R-NC). It was a consolidation of two previous proposals: the Special Counsel Independence Protection Act (S. 1735) sponsored by Booker and Graham, and the Special Counsel Integrity Act (S. 1741) sponsored by Tillis and Coons. The consolidated bill was announced on April 11, 2018, shortly after a raid on Michael Cohen related to the ongoing Special Counsel investigation, leading to renewed fears that President Donald Trump would fire Special Counsel Robert Mueller.

Senate Judiciary Committee Chair Chuck Grassley (R-IA) sought expedited consideration of the bill, although its chances of reaching a vote of the full Senate were considered slim due to opposition by the Republican leadership, even if the bill was passed by the committee. Senate Majority Leader Mitch McConnell (R-KY) on April 17 said that he would not bring the bill up for a vote of the full Senate, but Grassley said the Judiciary Committee would vote on it anyway. It was reported that Grassley was seeking an amendment that would require advance notice to Congress of a removal, and would require Congress to be notified if the scope of the special counsel's investigation changes. However, these changes were not included in the bill. The bill passed the committee on a 14–7 vote on April 26.

On September 27, 2018, Democrats tried to insert the text of the bill into three tax bills under consideration as an amendment, but the proposals were voted down.

=== 116th Congress ===
Versions of the bill were reintroduced at the beginning of the 116th United States Congress in January 2019 in both the House and the Senate. Although bill sponsor Lindsey Graham had become the Senate Judiciary Committee Chair, the Senate leadership was still opposed.

== Reactions ==
Members of the Republican Senate leadership opposed the bill. McConnell said, "There's no indication that Mueller's going to be fired", and "I'm the one who decides what we take to the floor, that's my responsibility as the majority leader, and we will not be having this on the floor of the Senate." Senate Majority Whip John Cornyn (R-TX) said, "I don't think it's necessary. And if it did pass, would the president sign it? I think it's unlikely that he would." Senate Minority Leader Chuck Schumer (D-NY) supported the bill, saying "Why not pass this legislation now and avoid a constitutional crisis?"

== See also ==
- Timeline of investigations into Trump and Russia (January–June 2018)
