= Dickerson Potato House =

- U.S. National Register of Historic Places
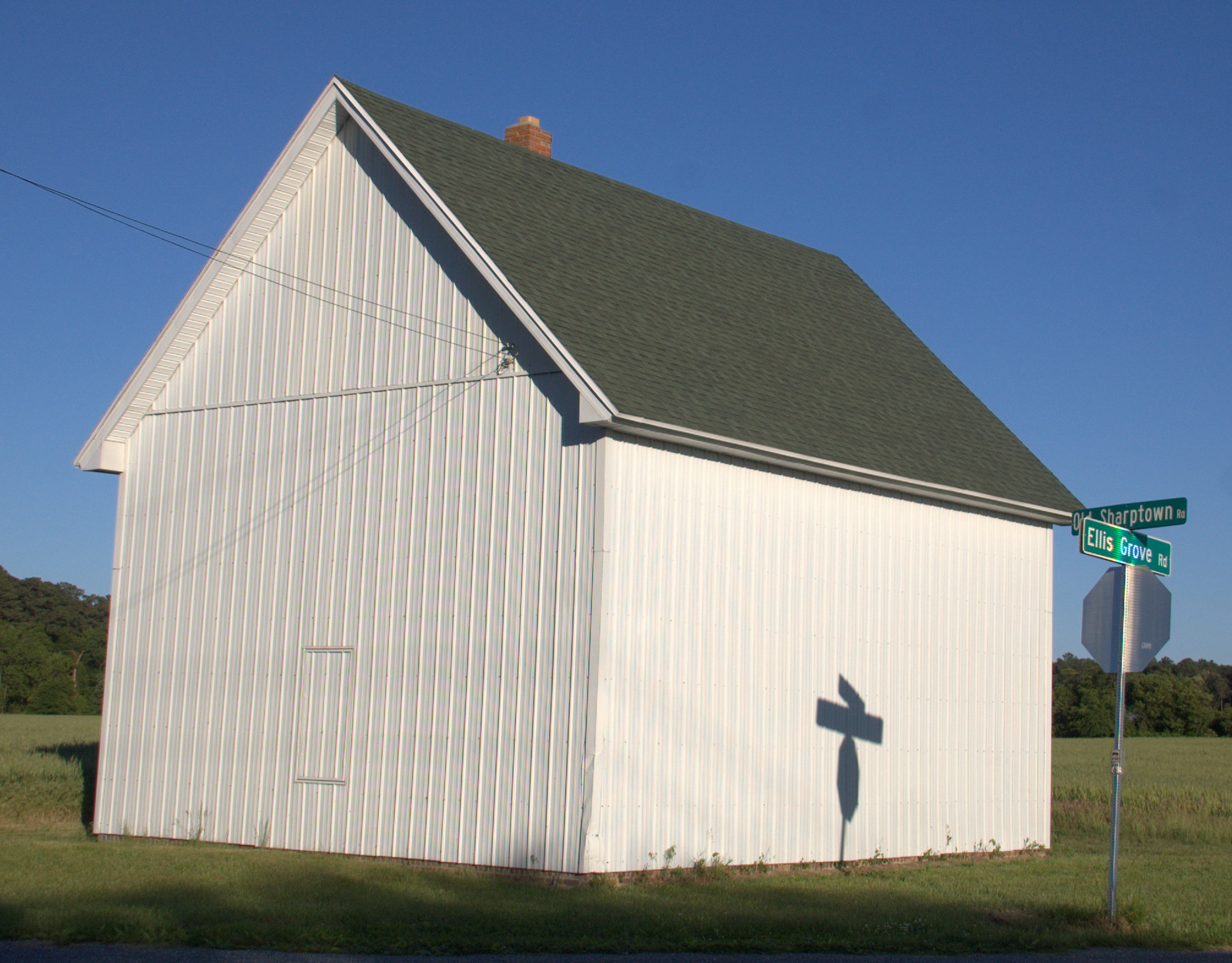

- Location within Delaware Location within the United States
- Location: Junction of Roads 494 and 498, near Delmar, Delaware
- Coordinates: 38°33′0″N 75°40′28″W
- Area: 0.1 acres (0.040 ha)
- Built: c. 1900
- MPS: Sweet Potato Houses of Sussex County MPS
- NRHP reference No.: 90001693
- Added to NRHP: November 15, 1990

Dickerson Potato House is a historic potato house located near Delmar, Sussex County, Delaware. It one of the last surviving examples of its building type. It was built about 1900, and is a two-story, gable fronted, balloon frame structure on a brick foundation. It measures 30 feet 4 inches by 23 feet 3 inches. It retains a number of important elements characteristic of potato house including: multiple sheathing, gable end orientation, interior chimney, and closely fitting window hatches.

It was placed on the National Register of Historic Places in 1990.
