= 2020 United States Senate election in Delaware =

- November 3, 2020
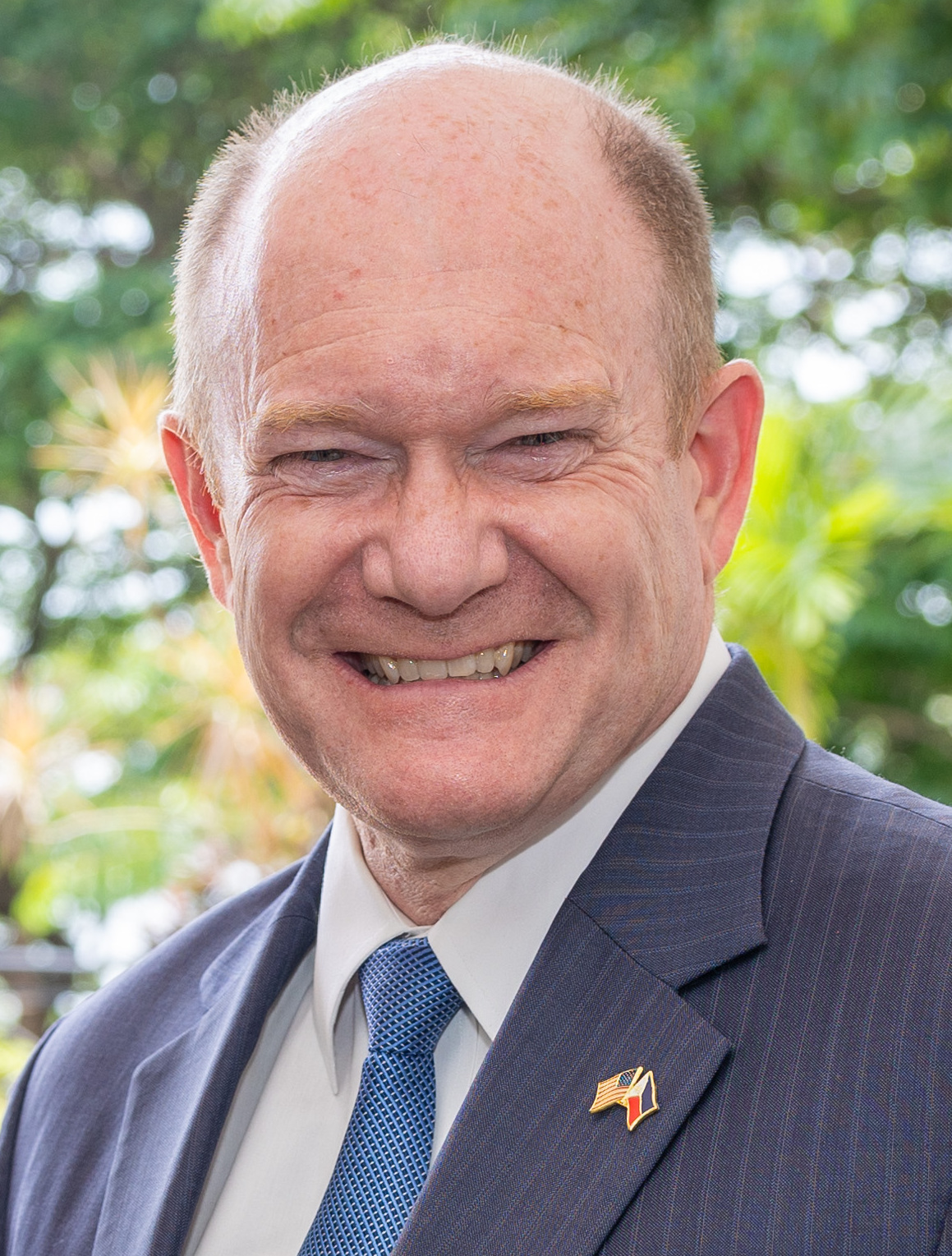

Nominee	Chris Coons	Lauren Witzke
Party	Democratic	Republican
Popular vote	291,804	186,054
Percentage	59.44%	37.90%
- Coons: 40–50% 50–60% 60–70% 70–80% 80–90% >90% Witzke: 40–50% 50–60% 60–70% 70–80% No data
U.S. senator before election
Chris Coons
Democratic
Elected U.S. Senator
Chris Coons
Democratic

The 2020 United States Senate election in Delaware was held on November 3, 2020, to elect a member of the United States Senate to represent the State of Delaware, concurrently with the 2020 U.S. presidential election, as well as other elections to the United States Senate, elections to the United States House of Representatives, and various state and local elections.

Incumbent Democratic senator Chris Coons ran for reelection to a second full term and won against Republican challenger Lauren Witzke with 59.4% of the vote. He outperformed Democratic presidential nominee and former Delaware Senator Joe Biden (whose seat Coons was elected to in a 2010 special election) by 0.7 percentage points, compared to the concurrent presidential election. Coons also won Kent County, a swing county, for the first time in his senatorial career.

== Democratic primary ==
=== Candidates ===
==== Nominee ====
- Chris Coons, incumbent U.S. senator

==== Eliminated in primary ====
- Jessica Scarane, technology executive

==== Withdrawn ====
- Scott Walker, Republican nominee for Delaware's at-large congressional district in 2018 (running for governor as a Republican)

==== Declined ====
- Kerri Evelyn Harris, former candidate for the Democratic nomination for U.S. Senate in 2018
- Lisa Blunt Rochester, incumbent U.S. representative for Delaware's at-large congressional district (running for re-election)

=== Endorsements ===
Chris Coons

U.S. vice presidents

- Joe Biden, 47th Vice President of the United States (2009-2017), United States Senator from Delaware (1973-2009), Democratic nominee for the 2020 election

State executives

- Jack Markell, Governor of Delaware (2009-2017), Treasurer of Delaware (1999-2009)

State legislators

- Margaret Rose Henry, Member of the Delaware Senate from the 2nd District (1994-2019), Majority Leader of the Delaware Senate (2017-2019)
- Sean Lynn, Member of the Delaware House of Representatives from the 31st district (2014-present)
- Nicole Poore, Majority Leader of the Delaware Senate (2009-present), Member of the Delaware Senate from the district 12 (2013-present)

Individuals

- Sarah McBride, LGBTQ rights activist, National Press Secretary of the Human Rights Campaign and candidate for the Delaware State Senate

Organizations

- 314 Action
- American Bankers Association
- Brady Campaign
- Council for a Livable World
- Delaware AFL-CIO
- Delaware Bankers Association
- Delaware Building and Construction Trades
- Delaware Stonewall PAC
- Democratic Majority for Israel
- End Citizens United
- Everytown for Gun Safety
- Giffords
- Human Rights Campaign
- Humane Society of the United States Legislative Fund
- Jewish Democratic Council of America
- Joint Action Committee for Political Affairs
- League of Conservation Voters
- Moms Demand Action
- NARAL Pro-Choice America
- Natural Resources Defense Council Action Fund
- Planned Parenthood
- Pro-Israel America
- Sierra Club
Jessica Scarane

State legislators

- John Kowalko, Member of the Delaware House of Representatives from the 25th district (2006-present)

Organizations

- Brand New Congress
- Democratic Socialists of America
- Sunrise Movement - Newark Hub

Political parties

- Working Families Party

=== Polling ===
Hypothetical head-to-head polling

with Lisa Blunt Rochester and Chris Coons

Poll source	Date(s) administered	Sample size (Note: Key: A – all adults RV – registered voters LV – likely voters V – unclear)	Margin of error	Lisa Blunt Rochester	Chris Coons	Undecided
Data for Progress	November 15–25, 2019	528 (LV)	± 6.1%	31%	35%	34%

with Chris Coons and more liberal female Democrat

Poll source	Date(s) administered	Sample size	Margin of error	Chris Coons	More liberal female Democrat	Undecided
Data for Progress	November 15–25, 2019	528 (LV)	± 6.1%	24% (Note: After being presented with a liberal set of arguments regarding Chris Coons)	45%	31%
Data for Progress	November 15–25, 2019	528 (LV)	± 6.1%	32% (Note: After being presented with a conservative set of arguments regarding Chris Coons)	36%	32%
Data for Progress	November 15–25, 2019	528 (LV)	± 6.1%	32% (Note: Voting intention without being presented with any arguments regarding Chris Coons)	36%	33%

=== Results ===
Results by county: Coons—70–80% Coons—60–70%

Democratic primary results
Party	Candidate	Votes	%
Democratic	Chris Coons (incumbent)	87,332	72.85%
Democratic	Jessica Scarane	32,547	27.15%
Total votes		119,879	100.00%

== Republican primary ==
=== Candidates ===
==== Nominee ====
- Lauren Witzke, far-right activist and proponent of the QAnon conspiracy theory

==== Eliminated in primary ====
- James DeMartino, attorney and nominee for the Delaware House of Representatives in 2016 & 2018

==== Declined ====
- Rob Arlett, former Sussex County councilman and nominee for U.S. Senate in 2018

=== Endorsements ===
James DeMartino

Organizations

- Delaware Colonial Region Republicans

Political parties

- Republican State Committee of Delaware
Lauren Witzke

U.S. representatives

- Paul Gosar, U.S. representative from Arizona (2011–present)

Individuals

- Nick Fuentes, white nationalist activist

=== Results ===
Results by county: Witzke—60–70% Witzke—50–60%

Republican primary results
Party	Candidate	Votes	%
Republican	Lauren Witzke	30,702	56.89%
Republican	James DeMartino	23,266	43.11%
Total votes		53,968	100.00%

== Other candidates ==
=== Libertarian Party ===
==== Nominee ====
- Nadine Frost, Libertarian candidate for U.S. Senate in 2018

=== Independent Party of Delaware ===
==== Nominee ====
- Mark Turley, small business owner

== General election ==
Prior to the election, Chris Coons' re-election was considered to be a near certainty regardless of the Republican challenger. The choice of Lauren Witzke, a controversial extremist and believer of QAnon, as the nominee, only cemented this prediction. Networks declared Coons the winner as soon as voting ended, based on exit polling alone. Coons also outperformed Biden (who also once held this Senate seat) in terms of percentage, but underperformed in terms of raw vote, likely due to the lack of third-party Senate candidates.

=== Predictions ===
Source	Ranking	As of
The Cook Political Report	Solid D	October 29, 2020
Inside Elections	Safe D	October 28, 2020
Sabato's Crystal Ball	Safe D	November 2, 2020
Daily Kos	Safe D	October 30, 2020
Politico	Safe D	November 2, 2020
RCP	Safe D	October 23, 2020
DDHQ	Safe D	November 3, 2020
538	Safe D	November 2, 2020
Economist	Safe D	November 2, 2020

=== General election endorsements ===
Chris Coons (D)

Labor unions

- International Federation of Professional and Technical Engineers

Organizations

- Delaware State Education Association
- National Education Association

=== Polling ===
Poll source	Date(s) administered	Sample size	Margin of error	Chris Coons (D)	Lauren Witzke (R)	Other/ Undecided
University of Delaware	September 21–27, 2020	847 (LV)	–	57%	27%	17% (Note: "None/other/undecided" with 11%; Turley (DI) with 4%; Frost (L) with 2%)

=== Results ===
United States Senate election in Delaware, 2020
Party	Candidate	Votes	%	±%
Democratic	Chris Coons (incumbent)	291,804	59.44%	+3.61%
Republican	Lauren Witzke	186,054	37.90%	−4.33%
Independent Party	Mark Turley	7,833	1.59%	N/A
Libertarian	Nadine Frost	5,244	1.07%	N/A
Total votes		490,935	100.0%	
Democratic hold				

==== By county ====
County	Chris Coons Democratic		Lauren Witzke Republican		Mark Turley IPoD		Nadine Frost Libertarian		Margin		Total votes
County	#	%	#	%	#	%	#	%	#	%	Total votes
Kent	43,893	51.65	38,571	45.39	1,553	1.83	958	1.13	5,322	6.26	84,975
New Castle	191,774	68.62	80,081	28.65	4,277	1.53	3,330	1.19	111,693	39.97	279,462
Sussex	56,137	44.38	67,402	53.28	2,003	1.58	956	0.76	-11,265	-8.90	126,498
Totals	291,804	59.44	186,054	37.90	7,833	1.60	5,244	1.07	105,750	21.54	490,935

Counties that flipped from Republican to Democratic

- Kent (largest municipality: Dover)
