= Highball Signal =

Historic railroad signal in Delmar, Delaware, US

- U.S. National Register of Historic Places
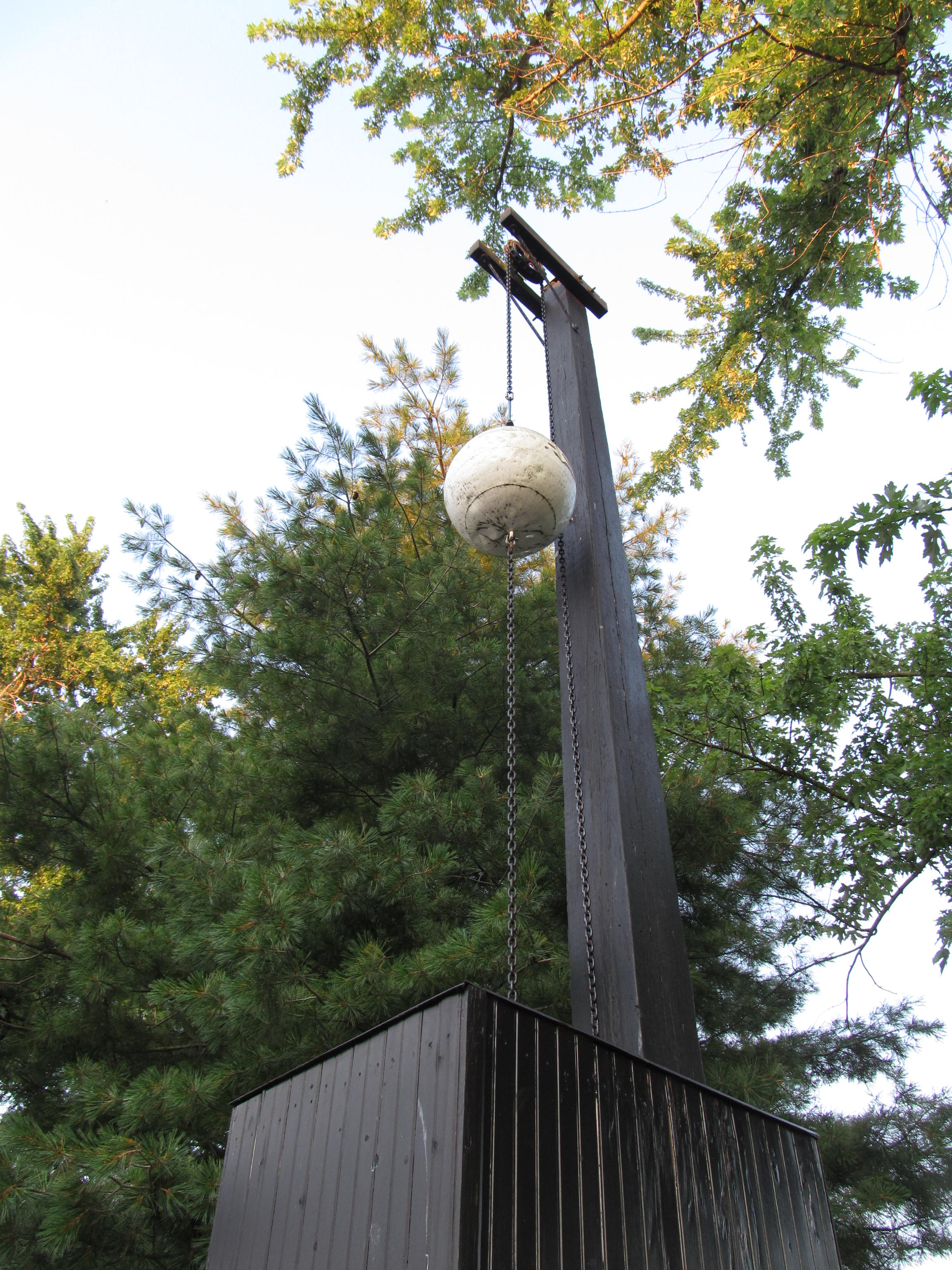
- Highball Signal, June 2012

- Location within Delaware Location within the United States
- Location: City park, near Delmarva Central Railroad in Delmar, Delaware, US
- Coordinates: 38.456414°N 75.578004°W
- Area: 0 acres (0 ha)
- NRHP reference No.: 73000553
- Added to NRHP: July 2, 1973

Highball Signal is a historic railroad signal located in Delmar, Delaware, United States. The signal can be described as a white sphere mounted onto a pole, located next to railroad tracks, intended to signal permission for a train to proceed at full speed; as long as the ball is at the top of the pole. The term "highball" came synonymous with a clear right-of-way and for trains to proceed at full speed. It was originally in service at New Castle, Delaware, and then at Hurlock, Maryland. The highball signal was moved to Delmar for display during the town's centennial in 1959, and is no longer used to direct railroad traffic, but is maintained as a public exhibition in a park near the railroad.

The Highball was placed on the US National Register of Historic Places in 1973.

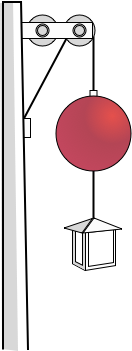
Ball Signal USA (1830) "High ball"
