= List of United States Senate committees =

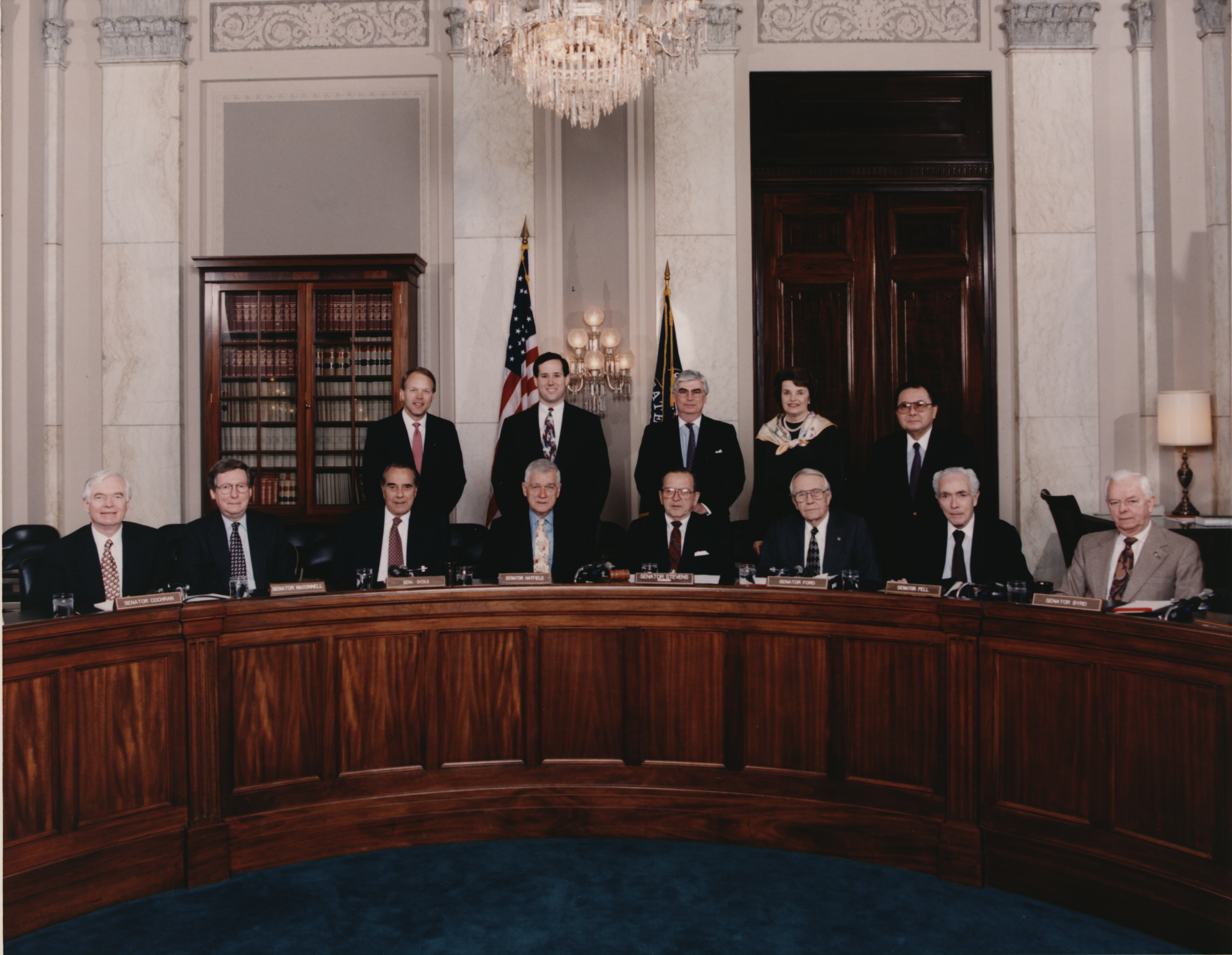
Senate Committee on Rules & Administration (1995)

Many U.S. congressional committees (standing committees and select or special committees) operate in the United States Senate. Senators can be a member of more than one committee.

== Standing committees ==
As of 2017, there are 88 subsidiary bodies of the US Senate: 16 standing committees with 67 subcommittees, four non-standing committees, and four joint committees.

| Committee | Chair | Ranking Member | Ref. |
| Subcommittee | Chair | Ranking Member | Ref. |
| Agriculture, Nutrition and Forestry | John Boozman (R-AR) | Amy Klobuchar (D-MN) | |
|---|---|---|---|
| Commodities, Derivatives, Risk Management and Trade | Cindy Hyde-Smith (R-MS) | Cory Booker (D-NJ) | |
| Conservation, Forestry, Natural Resources and Biotechnology | Roger Marshall (R-KS) | Michael Bennet (D-CO) | |
| Food and Nutrition, Specialty Crops, Organics and Research | Mitch McConnell (R-KY) | Ben Ray Luján (D-NM) | |
| Livestock, Dairy, Poultry and Food Safety | John Hoeven (R-ND) | Elissa Slotkin (D-MI) | |
| Rural Development, Energy and Credit | Joni Ernst (R-IA) | Peter Welch (D-VT) | |
| Appropriations | Susan Collins (R-ME) | Patty Murray (D-WA) | |
| Agriculture, Rural Development, Food and Drug Administration and Related Agencies | John Hoeven (R-ND) | Jeanne Shaheen (D-NH) | |
| Commerce, Justice, Science and Related Agencies | Jerry Moran (R-KS) | Chris Van Hollen (D-MD) | |
| Defense | Mitch McConnell (R-KY) | Chris Coons (D-DE) | |
| Energy and Water Development | John Kennedy (R-LA) | Patty Murray (D-WA) | |
| Financial Services and General Government | Bill Hagerty (R-TN) | Jack Reed (D-RI) | |
| Homeland Security | Katie Britt (R-AL) | Chris Murphy (D-CT) | |
| Interior, Environment and Related Agencies | Lisa Murkowski (R-AK) | Jeff Merkley (D-OR) | |
| Labor, Health and Human Services, Education and Related Agencies | Shelley Moore Capito (R-WV) | Tammy Baldwin (D-WI) | |
| Legislative Branch | Deb Fischer (R-NE) | Martin Heinrich (D-NM) | |
| Military Construction, Veterans Affairs and Related Agencies | John Boozman (R-AR) | Jon Ossoff (D-GA) | |
| State, Foreign Operations and Related Programs | Susan Collins (R-ME); Acting | Brian Schatz (D-HI) | |
| Transportation, Housing and Urban Development and Related Agencies | Cindy Hyde-Smith (R-MS) | Kirsten Gillibrand (D-NY) | |
| Armed Services | Roger Wicker (R-MS) | Jack Reed (D-RI) | |
| Airland | Kevin Cramer (R-ND) | Mark Kelly (D-AZ) | |
| Cybersecurity | Mike Rounds (R-SD) | Jacky Rosen (D-NV) | |
| Emerging Threats and Capabilities | Joni Ernst (R-IA) | Elissa Slotkin (D-MI) | |
| Personnel | Tommy Tuberville (R-AL) | Elizabeth Warren (D-MA) | |
| Readiness and Management Support | Dan Sullivan (R-AK) | Mazie Hirono (D-HI) | |
| Seapower | Rick Scott (R-FL) | Tim Kaine (D-VA) | |
| Strategic Forces | Deb Fischer (R-NE) | Angus King (I-ME) | |
| Banking, Housing and Urban Affairs | Tim Scott (R-SC) | Elizabeth Warren (D-MA) | |
| Digital Assets | Cynthia Lummis (R-WY) | Ruben Gallego (D-AZ) | |
| Economic Policy | John Kennedy (R-LA) | Raphael Warnock (D-GA) | |
| Financial Institutions and Consumer Protection | Thom Tillis (R-NC) | Catherine Cortez Masto (D-NV) | |
| Housing, Transportation and Community Development | Katie Britt (R-AL) | Tina Smith (D-MN) | |
| National Security and International Trade and Finance | Bill Hagerty (R-TN) | Andy Kim (D-NJ) | |
| Securities, Insurance and Investment | Mike Rounds (R-SD) | Mark Warner (D-VA) | |
| Budget | Ron Johnson (R-WI) | Jeff Merkley (D-OR) | |
| Commerce, Science and Transportation | Ted Cruz (R-TX) | Maria Cantwell (D-WA) | |
| Aviation, Space and Innovation | Jerry Moran (R-KS) | Tammy Duckworth (D-IL) | |
| Coast Guard, Maritime and Fisheries | Dan Sullivan (R-AK) | Lisa Blunt Rochester (D-DE) | |
| Consumer Protection, Technology and Data Privacy | Marsha Blackburn (R-TN) | John Hickenlooper (D-CO) | |
| Science, Manufacturing and Competitiveness | Ted Budd (R-NC) | Tammy Baldwin (D-WI) | |
| Surface Transportation, Freight, Pipelines and Safety | Todd Young (R-IN) | Gary Peters (D-MI) | |
| Telecommunications and Media | Deb Fischer (R-NE) | Ben Ray Luján (D-NM) | |
| Energy and Natural Resources | Mike Lee (R-UT) | Martin Heinrich (D-NM) | |
| Energy | Dave McCormick (R-PA) | Ruben Gallego (D-AZ) | |
| National Parks | Steve Daines (R-MT) | Angus King (I-ME) | |
| Public Lands, Forests and Mining | John Barrasso (R-WY) | Catherine Cortez Masto (D-NV) | |
| Water and Power | John Hoeven (R-ND) | Ron Wyden (D-OR) | |
| Environment and Public Works | Shelley Moore Capito (R-WV) | Sheldon Whitehouse (D-RI) | |
| Chemical Safety, Waste Management, Environmental Justice and Regulatory Oversight | John Curtis (R-UT) | Jeff Merkley (D-OR) | |
| Clean Air, Climate and Nuclear Innovation and Safety | Cynthia Lummis (R-WY) | Mark Kelly (D-AZ) | |
| Fisheries, Wildlife and Water | Pete Ricketts (R-NE) | Adam Schiff (D-CA) | |
| Transportation and Infrastructure | Kevin Cramer (R-ND) | Angela Alsobrooks (D-MD) | |
| Finance | Mike Crapo (R-ID) | Ron Wyden (D-OR) | |
| Energy, Natural Resources and Infrastructure | James Lankford (R-OK) | Maria Cantwell (D-WA) | |
| Fiscal Responsibility and Economic Growth | Ron Johnson (R-WI) | Tina Smith (D-MN) | |
| Health Care | Todd Young (R-IN) | Maggie Hassan (D-NH) | |
| International Trade, Customs and Global Competitiveness | John Cornyn (R-TX) | Raphael Warnock (D-GA) | |
| Social Security, Pensions and Family Policy | Chuck Grassley (R-IA) | Bernie Sanders (I-VT) | |
| Taxation and IRS Oversight | John Barrasso (R-WY) | Michael Bennet (D-CO) | |
| Foreign Relations | Jim Risch (R-ID) | Jeanne Shaheen (D-NH) | |
| Africa and Global Health Policy | Ted Cruz (R-TX) | Cory Booker (D-NJ) | |
| East Asia, the Pacific and International Cybersecurity Policy | Pete Ricketts (R-NE) | Chris Coons (D-DE) | |
| Europe and Regional Security Cooperation | Steve Daines (R-MT) | Chris Murphy (D-CT) | |
| Multilateral International Development, Multilateral Institutions and International Economic, Energy and Environmental Policy | Mike Lee (R-UT) | Tammy Duckworth (D-IL) | |
| Near East, South Asia, Central Asia and Counterterrorism | Dave McCormick (R-PA) | Jacky Rosen (D-NV) | |
| State Department and USAID Management, International Operations and Bilateral International Development | Bill Hagerty (R-TN) | Chris Van Hollen (D-MD) | |
| Western Hemisphere, Transnational Crime, Civilian Security, Democracy, Human Rights and Global Women's Issues | John Curtis (R-UT) | Tim Kaine (D-VA) | |
| Health, Education, Labor and Pensions | Bill Cassidy (R-LA) | Bernie Sanders (I-VT) | |
| Education and the American Family | Tommy Tuberville (R-AL) | Lisa Blunt Rochester (D-DE) | |
| Employment and Workplace Safety | Jim Banks (R-IN) | John Hickenlooper (D-CO) | |
| Primary Health and Retirement Security | Roger Marshall (R-KS) | Ed Markey (D-MA) | |
| Homeland Security and Governmental Affairs | Rand Paul (R-KY) | Gary Peters (D-MI) | |
| Border Management, Federal Workforce and Regulatory Affairs | James Lankford (R-OK) | John Fetterman (D-PA) | |
| Disaster Management, the District of Columbia and the Census | Josh Hawley (R-MO) | Andy Kim (D-NJ) | |
| Investigations (Permanent) | Ron Johnson (R-WI) | Richard Blumenthal (D-CT) | |
| Judiciary | Chuck Grassley (R-IA) | Dick Durbin (D-IL) | |
| Antitrust, Competition Policy and Consumer Rights | Mike Lee (R-UT) | Cory Booker (D-NJ) | |
| Border Security and Immigration | John Cornyn (R-TX) | Alex Padilla (D-CA) | |
| The Constitution | Eric Schmitt (R-MO) | Pete Welch (D-VT) | |
| Crime and Counterterrorism | Josh Hawley (R-MO) | Dick Durbin (D-IL) | |
| Federal Courts, Oversight, Agency Action and Federal Rights | Ted Cruz (R-TX) | Sheldon Whitehouse (D-RI) | |
| Intellectual Property | Thom Tillis (R-NC) | Adam Schiff (D-CA) | |
| Privacy, Technology and the Law | Marsha Blackburn (R-TN) | Amy Klobuchar (D-MN) | |
| Rules and Administration | Mitch McConnell (R-KY) | Alex Padilla (D-CA) | |
| Small Business and Entrepreneurship | Joni Ernst (R-IA) | Ed Markey (D-MA) | |
| Veterans' Affairs | Jerry Moran (R-KS) | Richard Blumenthal (D-CT) | |

== Non-standing committees ==
There are five non-standing, select, or special committees, which are treated similarly to standing committees.

| Committee | Chair | Ranking Member | Ref. |
| Aging (Special) | Rick Scott (R-FL) | Kirsten Gillibrand (D-NY) | |
| Ethics (Select) | James Lankford (R-OK) | Chris Coons (D-DE) | |
| Indian Affairs (Permanent Select) | Lisa Murkowski (R-AK) | Brian Schatz (D-HI) | |
| Intelligence (Select) | Tom Cotton (R-AR) | Mark Warner (D-VA) | |
| International Narcotics Control (Permanent Caucus) | John Cornyn (R-TX) | Sheldon Whitehouse (D-RI) | |

== Committee classes ==
Senate committees are divided, according to relative importance, into three categories: Class A, Class B, and Class C. In general, individual Senators are limited to service on two Class A committees and one Class B committee. Assignment to Class C committees is made without reference to a member's service on any other panels.

=== Standing committees ===
Standing committees are permanent bodies with specific responsibilities spelled out in the Senate's rules. Twelve of the sixteen current standing committees are Class A panels: Agriculture; Appropriations; Armed Services; Banking, Housing and Urban Affairs; Commerce, Science, and Transportation; Energy and Natural Resources; Environment and Public Works; Finance; Foreign Relations; Governmental Affairs; Judiciary; and Health, Education, Labor and Pensions.

There are four Class B standing committees: Budget, Rules and Administration, Small Business, and Veterans' Affairs. There are currently no Class C standing committees.

=== Other, select and special committees ===
Other (i.e., Indian Affairs), select and special committees are ranked as Class B or Class C committees. They are created for clearly specified purposes. There are currently two Class B committees: the Select Committee on Intelligence and the Special Committee on Aging, and two Class C committees: the Select Committee on Indian Affairs and the Select Committee on Ethics.

=== Joint committees ===
Joint Committees are used for purposes of legislative and administrative coordination between the Senate and the House of Representatives. At present there are four: the Joint Economic Committee (Class B), the Joint Committee on the Library (Class C), the Joint Committee on Printing (Class C), and the Joint Committee on Taxation (Class C).

=== Jurisdiction ===
Standing committees in the Senate have their jurisdiction set by three primary sources: Senate Rules, ad hoc Senate Resolutions, and Senate Resolutions related to committee funding. To see an overview of the jurisdictions of standing committees in the Senate, see Standing Rules of the United States Senate, Rule XXV.

== Party leadership ==
Each party determines their committees leads, who serve as chair in the majority and ranking member in the minority. The table below lists the tenure of when each member was selected for their current term as committee lead. The Republican party rules stipulate that their leads of standing committees may serve no more than three congressional terms (two years each) as chair or ranking member, unless the full party conference grants them a waiver to do so. The current majority party is listed first for each committee.

| Committee | Party Lead | State | Start | Party |
|---|---|---|---|---|
| Aging (Special) | Rick Scott | FL | January 3, 2025 | Republican |
| Aging (Special) | Kirsten Gillibrand | NY | January 3, 2025 | Democratic |
| Agriculture, Nutrition and Forestry | John Boozman | AR | January 3, 2021 | Republican |
| Agriculture, Nutrition and Forestry | Amy Klobuchar | MN | January 3, 2025 | Democratic |
| Appropriations | Susan Collins | ME | January 3, 2023 | Republican |
| Appropriations | Patty Murray | WA | January 3, 2023 | Democratic |
| Armed Services | Roger Wicker | MS | January 3, 2023 | Republican |
| Armed Services | Jack Reed | RI | January 3, 2015 | Democratic |
| Banking, Housing and Urban Affairs | Tim Scott | SC | January 3, 2023 | Republican |
| Banking, Housing and Urban Affairs | Elizabeth Warren | MA | January 3, 2025 | Democratic |
| Budget | Ron Johnson | WI | July 13, 2026 | Republican |
| Budget | Jeff Merkley | OR | January 3, 2025 | Democratic |
| Commerce, Science and Transportation | Ted Cruz | TX | January 3, 2023 | Republican |
| Commerce, Science and Transportation | Maria Cantwell | WA | January 3, 2019 | Democratic |
| Energy and Natural Resources | Mike Lee | UT | January 3, 2025 | Republican |
| Energy and Natural Resources | Martin Heinrich | NM | January 3, 2025 | Democratic |
| Environment and Public Works | Shelley Moore Capito | WV | January 3, 2021 | Republican |
| Environment and Public Works | Sheldon Whitehouse | RI | January 3, 2025 | Democratic |
| Ethics (Select) | James Lankford | OK | December 19, 2019 | Republican |
| Ethics (Select) | Chris Coons | DE | January 3, 2017 | Democratic |
| Finance | Mike Crapo | ID | January 3, 2021 | Republican |
| Finance | Ron Wyden | OR | February 12, 2014 | Democratic |
| Foreign Relations | Jim Risch | ID | January 3, 2019 | Republican |
| Foreign Relations | Jeanne Shaheen | NH | January 3, 2025 | Democratic |
| Health, Education, Labor and Pensions | Bill Cassidy | LA | January 3, 2023 | Republican |
| Health, Education, Labor and Pensions | Bernie Sanders | VT | January 3, 2023 | Independent |
| Homeland Security and Governmental Affairs | Rand Paul | KY | January 3, 2023 | Republican |
| Homeland Security and Governmental Affairs | Gary Peters | MI | January 3, 2019 | Democratic |
| Indian Affairs (Permanent Select) | Lisa Murkowski | AK | January 3, 2021 | Republican |
| Indian Affairs (Permanent Select) | Brian Schatz | HI | January 3, 2021 | Democratic |
| Intelligence (Select) | Tom Cotton | AR | January 3, 2025 | Republican |
| Intelligence (Select) | Mark Warner | VA | January 3, 2017 | Democratic |
| International Narcotics Control (Permanent Caucus) | John Cornyn | TX | January 3, 2025 | Republican |
| International Narcotics Control (Permanent Caucus) | Sheldon Whitehouse | RI | January 3, 2021 | Democratic |
| Judiciary | Chuck Grassley | IA | January 3, 2025 | Republican |
| Judiciary | Dick Durbin | IL | January 3, 2021 | Democratic |
| Rules and Administration | Mitch McConnell | KY | January 3, 2025 | Republican |
| Rules and Administration | Alex Padilla | CA | January 3, 2025 | Democratic |
| Small Business and Entrepreneurship | Joni Ernst | IA | January 3, 2023 | Republican |
| Small Business and Entrepreneurship | Ed Markey | MA | January 3, 2025 | Democratic |
| Veterans' Affairs | Jerry Moran | KS | January 6, 2020 | Republican |
| Veterans' Affairs | Richard Blumenthal | CT | January 3, 2025 | Democratic |

== See also ==
- List of United States House of Representatives committees
- List of United States congressional joint committees
- List of defunct United States congressional committees
