= List of United States congressional joint committees =

This is a list of active joint United States congressional committees.

== Committee leadership ==
For purpose of seniority on joint committees, total time in Congress—Senate and House—is counted. Most joint committees rotate their chair and vice chair position between each chamber's majority at the end of a congressional term (two years), except for Taxation, which starts each term led by the House and rotates to the Senate at the end of each term's session (one calendar year).

=== Standing committees ===
Committee	Chair	Vice Chair	Ranking Member	Vice Ranking Member
Economic	Rep. David Schweikert (R-AZ)	Sen. Eric Schmitt (R-MO)	Sen. Maggie Hassan (D-NH)	Rep. Don Beyer (D-VA)
Library	Rep. Bryan Steil (R-WI)	Sen. Mitch McConnell (R-KY)	Sen. Alex Padilla (D-CA)	Rep. Joe Morelle (D-NY)
Printing	Sen. Mitch McConnell (R-KY)	Rep. Bryan Steil (R-WI)	Rep. Joe Morelle (D-NY)	Sen. Alex Padilla (D-CA)
Taxation	Sen. Mike Crapo (R-ID)	Rep. Jason Smith (R-MO)	Rep. Richard Neal (D-MA)	Sen. Ron Wyden (D-OR)

=== Non-standing committees ===
Committee	Chair	Vice Chair	Ranking Member	Vice Ranking Member
China (Congressional-Executive Commission)	Sen. Dan Sullivan (R-AK)	Rep. Chris Smith (R-NJ)	Rep. Jim McGovern (D-MA)	Sen. Jeff Merkley (D-OR)
Security and Cooperation in Europe (Helsinki Commission)	Sen. Roger Wicker (R-MS)	Rep. Joe Wilson (R-SC)	Rep. Steve Cohen (D-TN)	Sen. Sheldon Whitehouse (R-RI)

== Party leadership ==
Each party determines their committees leads, who serve as chair in the majority and ranking member in the minority. The joint committees alternate between the chambers, with the majority lead in one serving as chair and the other as vice chair (and their respective minority opposites in the other chamber as ranking member and vice ranking member). The table below lists the tenure of when each member was selected for their current term as committee lead. The Republican party rules stipulate that their leads of standing committees may serve no more than three congressional terms (two years each) as chair or ranking member, unless the full party conference grants them a waiver to do so. This applies to the joint committees on Printing and on the Library (whose leads are from the Senate Rules and Administration and House Administration committees) and on Taxation (whose leads are from the Senate Finance and House Ways and Means committees). The current majority party of their respective chamber is listed first for each committee.

=== Senate leads ===
Committee	Party Lead	State	Start	Party
China (Congressional-Executive Commission)	Jeff Merkley	OR	January 3, 2021	Democratic
China (Congressional-Executive Commission)	Dan Sullivan	AK	January 3, 2025	Republican
Economic	Maggie Hassan	NH	January 3, 2025	Democratic
Economic	Eric Schmitt	MO	January 3, 2025	Republican
Library	Alex Padilla	CA	January 3, 2025	Democratic
Library	Mitch McConnell	KY	January 3, 2025	Republican
Printing	Alex Padilla	CA	January 3, 2025	Democratic
Printing	Mitch McConnell	KY	January 3, 2025	Republican
Security and Cooperation (Helsinki Commission)	Sheldon Whitehouse	RI	January 3, 2025	Democratic
Security and Cooperation (Helsinki Commission)	Roger Wicker	MS	January 3, 2011	Republican
Taxation	Ron Wyden	OR	February 12, 2014	Democratic
Taxation	Mike Crapo	ID	January 3, 2021	Republican

=== House leads ===
Committee	Party Lead	Start	State	Party
China (Congressional-Executive Commission)	Chris Smith	NJ	January 3, 2007	Republican
China (Congressional-Executive Commission)	Jim McGovern	MA	January 3, 2019	Democratic
Economic	David Schweikert	AZ	January 3, 2019	Republican
Economic	Don Beyer	VA	January 16, 2020	Democratic
Library	Bryan Steil	WI	January 3, 2023	Republican
Library	Joe Morelle	NY	January 3, 2023	Democratic
Printing	Bryan Steil	WI	January 3, 2023	Republican
Printing	Joe Morelle	NY	January 3, 2023	Democratic
Security and Cooperation (Helsinki Commission)	Joe Wilson	SC	January 3, 2019	Republican
Security and Cooperation (Helsinki Commission)	Steve Cohen	TN	April 6, 2021	Democratic
Taxation	Jason Smith	MO	January 3, 2023	Republican
Taxation	Richard Neal	MA	January 3, 2017	Democratic

== See also ==
- United States Joint Congressional Committee on Inaugural Ceremonies
- List of United States Senate committees
- List of United States House of Representatives committees
- List of defunct United States congressional committees

== Sources and external links ==
- "OFFICIAL ALPHABETICAL LIST OF THE HOUSE OF REPRESENTATIVES of the UNITED STATES ONE HUNDRED ELEVENTH CONGRESS". Clerk of the House of Representatives. August 3, 2011.
