= United States Senate Homeland Security Subcommittee on Border Management, Federal Workforce, and Regulatory Affairs =

The Subcommittee on Border Management, Federal Workforce, and Regulatory Affairs is one of the four subcommittees within the Senate Committee on Homeland Security and Governmental Affairs. It was known in previous Congresses as the Subcommittee on Regulatory Affairs and Federal Management and the Subcommittee on Government Operations and Border Management

== Jurisdiction ==
- Examining the federal rulemaking process including regulatory review, and evaluating the effectiveness, efficiency, economic impact, legal authority, and federal role for past and proposed regulations;
- Reviewing federal contracting and procurement, including the Federal Acquisition Regulation, and the acquisition functions of the General Services Administration and the Office of the Federal Procurement Policy;
- Assessing the management, efficiency, effectiveness, and economy of agencies and departments of the government, including oversight of issues related to energy and national security;
- Examining and assessing the federal workforce and federal employee issues, including employees’ classification, compensation and benefits, and federal benefits and retirement programs;
- Evaluating and addressing the federal government's roles and responsibilities in America's economic competitiveness and cooperation with private industry;
- Reviewing and assessing border management and operations;
- Conducting oversight of:
  - United States Postal Service modernization and solvency;
  - United States Census Bureau; and
  - The District of Columbia, excluding appropriations, but including the judicial system.

== Members, 119th Congress ==
Majority	Minority
James Lankford, Oklahoma, Chair; Ron Johnson, Wisconsin; Bernie Moreno, Ohio; Joni Ernst, Iowa; Ashley Moody, Florida	John Fetterman, Pennsylvania, Ranking Member; Maggie Hassan, New Hampshire; Ruben Gallego, Arizona; Elissa Slotkin, Michigan
Ex officio
Rand Paul, Kentucky	Gary Peters, Michigan

== Historical subcommittee rosters ==
=== 118th Congress ===
Majority	Minority
Kyrsten Sinema, Arizona, Chair; Tom Carper, Delaware; Alex Padilla, California (until October 17, 2023); Richard Blumenthal, Connecticut; Laphonza Butler, California (from October 17, 2023)	James Lankford, Oklahoma, Ranking Member; Ron Johnson, Wisconsin; Mitt Romney, Utah
Ex officio
Gary Peters, Michigan	Rand Paul, Kentucky
