= Laphonza Butler =

American politician and official (born 1979)

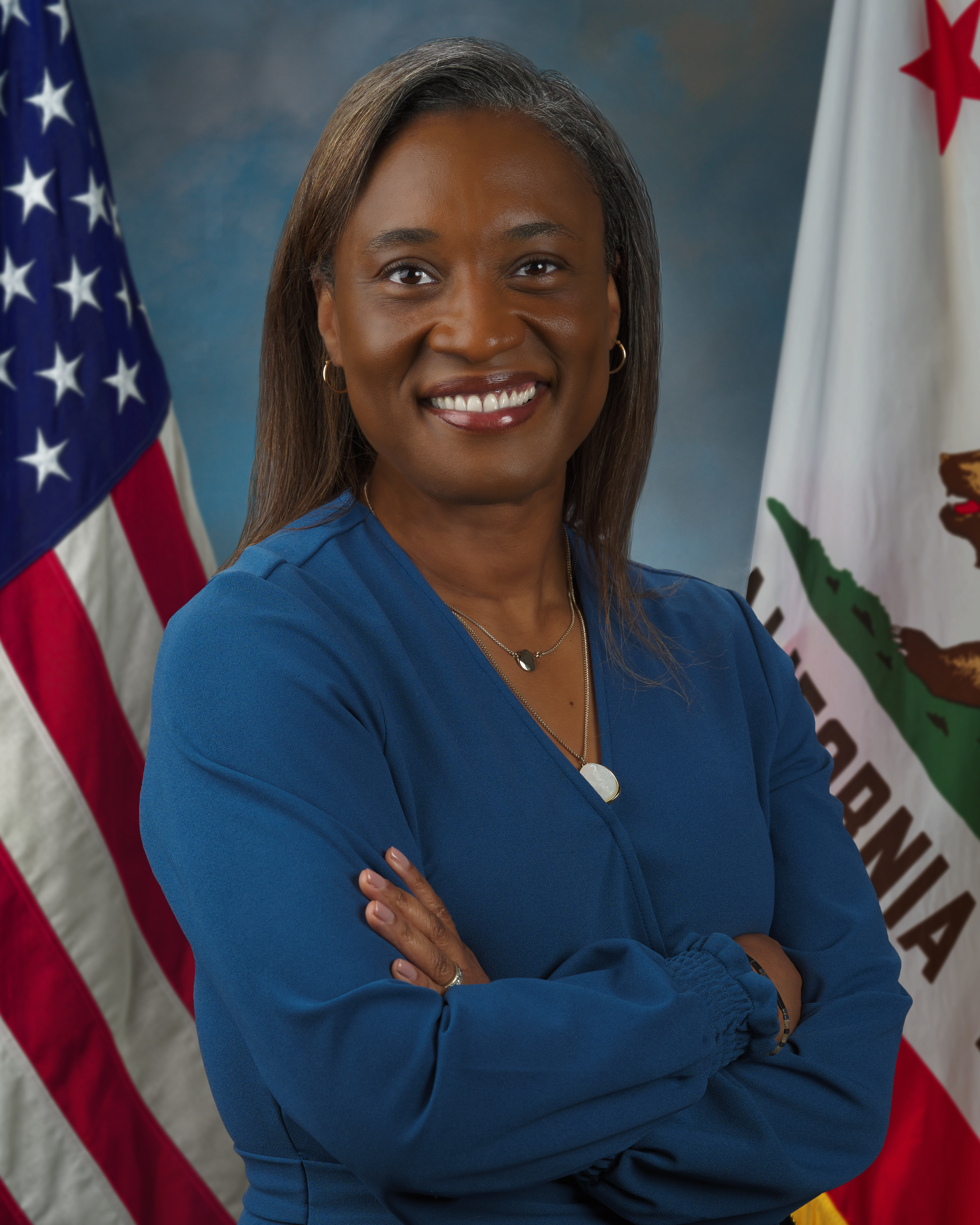
- Official portrait, 2023

United States Senator from California
- In office October 1, 2023 – December 8, 2024
- Appointed by: Gavin Newsom
- Preceded by: Dianne Feinstein
- Succeeded by: Adam Schiff

Personal details
- Born: Laphonza Romanique Butler; May 11, 1979 (age 47) Magnolia, Mississippi, U.S.
- Party: Democratic
- Spouse: Neneki Lee
- Children: 1
- Education: Jackson State University (BA)
- Butler's voice Butler on her appointment to the Senate and early life. Recorded January 17, 2024

Laphonza Romanique Butler (/ləˈfɒnzə/ lə-FON-zə; born May 11, 1979) is an American labor union official and former politician who served as a United States senator from California from 2023 to 2024. Butler began her career as a union organizer, and served as president of California SEIU State Council from 2013 to 2018. A member of the Democratic Party, she was a regent of the University of California system from 2018 to 2021, and the president of EMILY's List from 2021 to 2023.

Butler is a longtime ally of Kamala Harris. On October 1, 2023, California Governor Gavin Newsom chose Butler to fill the United States Senate seat left vacant by the death of Dianne Feinstein, becoming the first openly LGBT African American to serve in the Senate. Soon after taking office, she announced on October 19, 2023, that she would not run for a full term in the 2024 election. Adam Schiff was elected to succeed her.

== Early life and education ==
Butler was born on May 11, 1979, in Magnolia, Mississippi, the youngest of three children. Her father died of heart disease when Butler was 16 years old. She graduated as a salutatorian from South Pike High School in 1997. Butler earned a bachelor's degree in political science from Jackson State University in 2001.

== Career ==
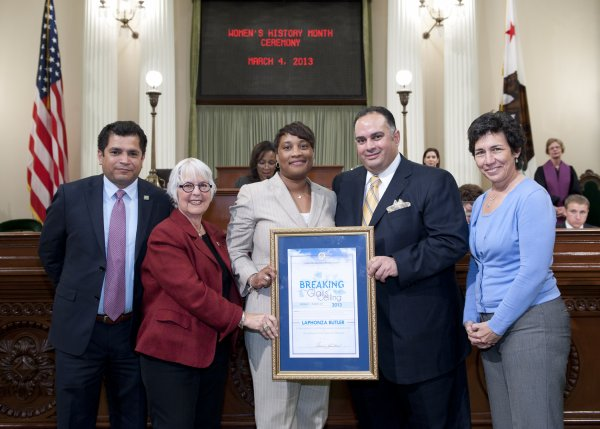
Butler (center) with State Assemblymembers Jimmy Gomez, Bonnie Lowenthal, John Pérez, and Susan Eggman in 2013

Butler began her career as a union organizer for nurses in Baltimore and Milwaukee, janitors in Philadelphia, and hospital workers in New Haven, Connecticut. In 2009, she moved to California, where she organized in-home caregivers and nurses and served as president of SEIU United Long Term Care Workers, SEIU Local 2015. Butler was elected president of the California SEIU State Council in 2013. She undertook efforts to boost California's minimum wage and raise income taxes on the wealthiest Californians. As president of SEIU Local 2015, Butler endorsed Hillary Clinton in the 2016 Democratic presidential primary. Butler was one of California's electors who voted for Clinton in the 2016 election.

In 2018, California Governor Jerry Brown appointed Butler to a 12-year term as a regent of the University of California. She resigned from her role as regent in 2021.

Butler joined SCRB Strategies, a California-based political-consulting firm, as a partner in 2018. At SCRB, she played a central role in Kamala Harris's 2020 presidential campaign. She has been a political ally of Harris's since the latter's first run for California Attorney General in 2010, when she helped Harris negotiate a shared SEIU endorsement in the race. Butler advised Uber in its dealings with organized labor while at SCRB, at a time when Uber was attempting to stop state legislation from classifying its drivers as employees. The New York Times reported that Butler "advised Uber on how to deal with unions like the Teamsters and S.E.I.U., and sat in on several face-to-face meetings between the gig companies and union representatives". Butler left SCRB in 2020 to join Airbnb as director of public policy and campaigns in North America.

In 2021, Butler was named the third president of EMILY's List. She was the first black woman and first mother to lead the organization. In February 2022, Butler joined the board of directors of Vision to Learn.

== U.S. Senate ==
=== Appointment ===
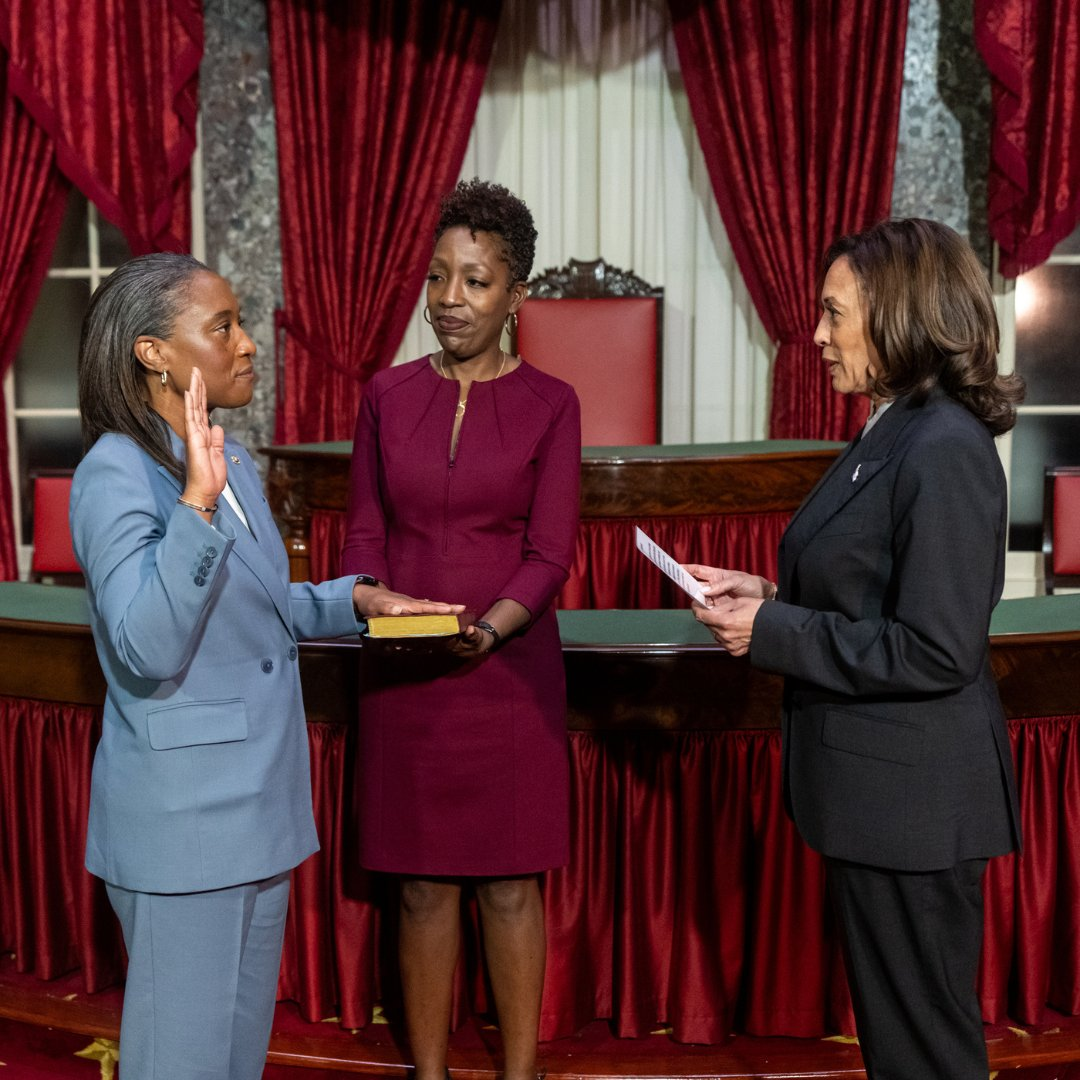
Butler sworn in by Vice President Kamala Harris in the Old Senate Chamber in 2023. Butler's wife Neneki Lee (center) holds the Bible upon which Butler is taking the oath.

In February 2023, incumbent U.S. Senator Dianne Feinstein announced she would not run for a sixth full term in the Senate in 2024. On September 29, 2023, she died at the age of 90. At the time of Feinstein's death, several prominent candidates had already announced campaigns for her seat, including U.S. Representatives Barbara Lee, Katie Porter, and Adam Schiff. California Governor Gavin Newsom had previously pledged to nominate a black woman to the office.

On October 1, 2023, Newsom chose Butler to fill the Senate seat left vacant by Feinstein's death, fulfilling his pledge to appoint a black woman. Butler was selected despite not being a resident of California, as she had moved to Maryland in 2021. The United States Constitution requires only that senators be "inhabitants" of the state they represent. Newsom's office said that Butler would re-register to vote in California before taking office as a senator. Shortly before nominating Butler, Newsom announced that his nominee would be free to run in 2024 if that person so chose, a departure from his previous position. After being sworn in, Butler announced she would not seek election to a full Senate term or run in the November 2024 special election for the final two months of Feinstein's term. Adam Schiff won both elections.

When she was sworn in on October 3, 2023, Butler became the first openly lesbian Black woman in Congress, the first openly LGBT member of the U.S. Senate from California, and its first openly LGBT Black member.

During the 2024 presidential election campaign, Butler was described as a close ally of Democratic nominee Kamala Harris, herself a former U.S. Senator from California; Butler had previously advised her during her 2020 campaign. Butler was identified by media sources as a likely contender for a position in a Harris administration.

=== Tenure ===
Butler made her first floor speech on January 17, 2024. Beginning in February 2024, she read aloud from banned books on the Senate floor to bring attention to book banning.

In January 2024, Butler voted for a resolution proposed by Bernie Sanders to apply the human rights provisions of the Foreign Assistance Act to U.S. aid to Israel's military. The proposal was defeated, 72 to 11.

During her tenure, Butler introduced 33 pieces of legislation and cosponsored 333 more.

On September 12, 2024, Butler introduced the Workforce of the Future Act of 2024, which was aimed at promoting a twenty first century Artificial Intelligence workforce and creating a program to increase access to prekindergarten through grade 12 emerging and advanced technology education and upskill workers in the technology of the future.

Butler resigned from the Senate on December 8, 2024, and was succeeded by Adam Schiff, who in November 2024 was elected both to complete the remaining weeks of Feinstein's Senate term and to the new Class 1 Senate term beginning in January 2025.

=== Committee assignments ===
- Committee on Banking, Housing, and Urban Affairs
  - Subcommittee on Housing, Transportation, and Community Development
  - Subcommittee on National Security and International Trade and Finance
  - Subcommittee on Securities, Insurance, and Investment
- Committee on Homeland Security and Governmental Affairs
  - Subcommittee on Government Operations and Border Management
  - Permanent Subcommittee on Investigations
- Committee on the Judiciary
  - Subcommittee on the Constitution (Chair)
  - Subcommittee on Criminal Justice and Counterterrorism
  - Subcommittee on Federal Courts, Oversight, Agency Action and Federal Rights
  - Subcommittee on Human Rights and the Law
- Committee on Rules and Administration

=== Caucus memberships ===
- Congressional Black Caucus

== Post-congressional tenure ==
After leaving office, Butler joined public affairs firm Actum in 2025. She reportedly signed on as an advisor for the creator of ChatGPT, OpenAI.

== Personal life ==
Butler is an open and proud lesbian, who shares a daughter with her wife, Neneci Lee. They moved to Silver Spring, Maryland in 2021, when she assumed the presidency of EMILY's List, while continuing to own a home in View Park, California, in Los Angeles County. In October 2023 when Newsom appointed her to the Senate, she moved to that home and re-registered to vote in California.

== See also ==
- List of African-American United States senators
- List of LGBT members of the United States Congress
- Sáttítla Highlands National Monument, created by President Biden with Butler's support
- Women in the United States Senate

U.S. Senate
Preceded by Dianne Feinstein	U.S. Senator (Class 1) from California; 2023–2024; Served alongside: Alex Padilla	Succeeded by Adam Schiff
U.S. order of precedence (ceremonial)
Preceded by George LeMieux as Former U.S. Senator	Order of precedence of the United States	Succeeded by Dean Barkley as Former U.S. Senator
