= United States Senate Judiciary Subcommittee on Intellectual Property =

The Senate Judiciary Subcommittee on Intellectual Property is one of Eight subcommittees within the Senate Judiciary Committee. The subcommittee was disbanded in 2007, but reinstated in 2019 at the beginning of the 116th Congress.

== Jurisdiction ==
The committee's jurisdiction extends to:

- (1) Intellectual Property laws, including those affecting patents, copyrights and trademarks;
- (2) Oversight of the U.S. Patent and Trademark Office;
- (3) Oversight of the U.S. Copyright Office;
- (4) Oversight of the intellectual property laws, treaties and policies affecting international trade.

== Members, 119th Congress ==
Majority	Minority
Thom Tillis, North Carolina, Chair; Mike Lee, Utah; Marsha Blackburn, Tennessee; Eric Schmitt, Missouri; Katie Britt, Alabama; Ashley Moody, Florida	Adam Schiff, California, Ranking Member; Sheldon Whitehouse, Rhode Island; Chris Coons, Delaware; Mazie Hirono, Hawaii; Peter Welch, Vermont

== Historical subcommittee rosters ==
=== 118th Congress ===
Majority	Minority
Chris Coons, Delaware, Chair; Peter Welch, Vermont; Mazie Hirono, Hawaii; Alex Padilla, California; Jon Ossoff, Georgia	Thom Tillis, North Carolina, Ranking Member; John Cornyn, Texas; Tom Cotton, Arkansas; Marsha Blackburn, Tennessee

=== 117th Congress ===
Majority	Minority
Patrick Leahy, Vermont, Chair; Chris Coons, Delaware; Mazie Hirono, Hawaii; Alex Padilla, California	Thom Tillis, North Carolina, Ranking Member; John Cornyn, Texas; Tom Cotton, Arkansas; Marsha Blackburn, Tennessee

=== 116th Congress ===
Majority	Minority
Thom Tillis, North Carolina, Chair; Marsha Blackburn, Tennessee; Ben Sasse, Nebraska; Lindsey Graham, South Carolina; John Cornyn, Texas; Mike Lee, Utah; Chuck Grassley, Iowa; Mike Crapo, Idaho	Chris Coons, Delaware, Ranking Member; Patrick Leahy, Vermont; Mazie Hirono, Hawaii; Kamala Harris, California; Sheldon Whitehouse, Rhode Island; Dick Durbin, Illinois; Richard Blumenthal, Connecticut

== See also ==
- United States Senate Committee on the Judiciary
- United States Senate Judiciary Subcommittee on Privacy, Technology and the Law
