= United States Senate Committee on the Judiciary =

Standing committee of the U.S. Senate

Senate Judiciary Committee
Standing committee
- Active United States Senate; 119th Congress

History
- Formed: December 10, 1816

Leadership
- Chair: Chuck Grassley (R); Since January 3, 2025
- Ranking Member: Dick Durbin (D); Since January 3, 2025

Structure
- Seats: 22 members
- Political parties: Majority (12): Republican (12); Minority (10): Democratic (10)

Jurisdiction
- Policy areas: Federal judiciary, civil procedure, criminal procedure, civil liberties, copyrights, patents, trademarks, naturalization, constitutional amendments, congressional apportionment, state and territorial boundary lines
- Oversight authority: Department of Justice, Department of Homeland Security, federal judicial nominations
- House counterpart: House Committee on the Judiciary

Meeting place
- 226 Dirksen Senate Office Building, Washington, D.C.
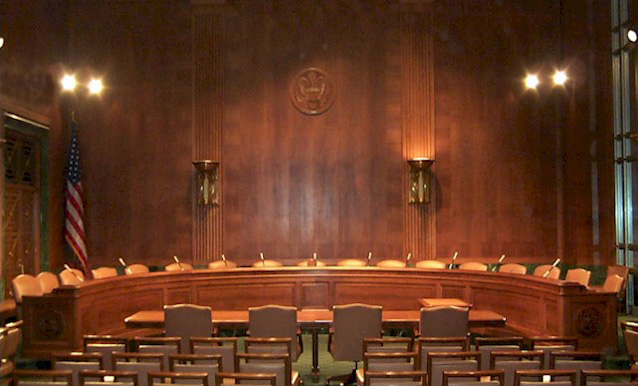

Website
- judiciary.senate.gov

Rules
- Rule XXV.1.(m), Standing Rules of the Senate; Rules of Procedure U.S. Senate Committee on the Judiciary

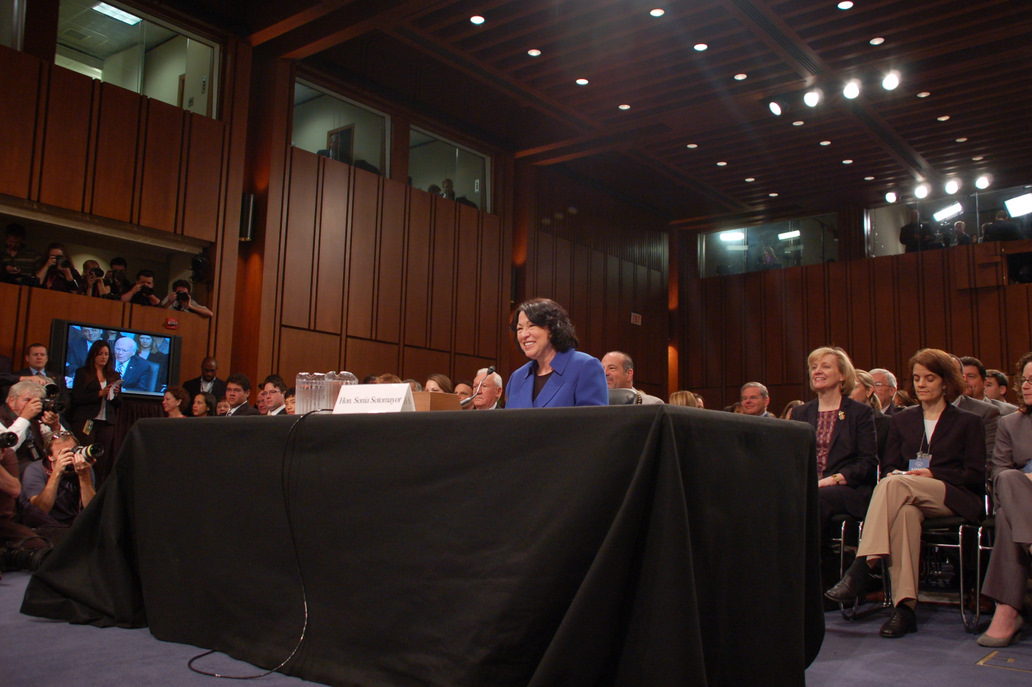
Sonia Sotomayor testifying before the Senate Judiciary Committee on her nomination for the United States Supreme Court

The United States Senate Committee on the Judiciary, informally known as the Senate Judiciary Committee, is a standing committee of 22 U.S. senators whose role is to oversee the Department of Justice (DOJ), consider executive and judicial nominations, and review pending legislation.

In addition, the Standing Rules of the Senate confer jurisdiction to the Senate Judiciary Committee in certain areas, such as considering proposed constitutional amendments and legislation related to federal criminal law, human rights law, immigration, intellectual property, antitrust law, and internet privacy.

== History ==
Established in 1816 as one of the original standing committees in the United States Senate, the Senate Committee on the Judiciary is one of the oldest and most influential committees in Congress. Its broad legislative jurisdiction has assured its primary role as a forum for the public discussion of social and constitutional issues. The committee is also responsible for oversight of key activities of the executive branch, and is responsible for the initial stages of the confirmation process of all judicial nominations for the federal judiciary.

=== Nominations ===
The committee considers presidential nominations for positions in the DOJ, including the attorney general and the director of the FBI, the Office of National Drug Control Policy, the State Justice Institute, and certain positions in the Department of Commerce and DHS. It is also in charge of holding hearings and investigating judicial nominations to the Supreme Court, the U.S. court of appeals, the U.S. district courts, and the Court of International Trade.

If a majority on the committee votes to advance a nomination, the nominee is reported favorably to the whole Senate, which can vote by simple majority to confirm the nominee.

=== Oversight ===
The Judiciary Committee's oversight of the DOJ includes all of the agencies under the DOJ's jurisdiction, such as the FBI. It also has oversight of the Department of Homeland Security (DHS).

== Members, 119th Congress ==
(January 3, 2025 – January 3, 2027)

Majority	Minority
Chuck Grassley, Iowa, Chair; John Cornyn, Texas; Mike Lee, Utah; Ted Cruz, Texas; Josh Hawley, Missouri; Thom Tillis, North Carolina; John Kennedy, Louisiana; Marsha Blackburn, Tennessee; Eric Schmitt, Missouri; Katie Britt, Alabama; Ashley Moody, Florida; Darline Graham, South Carolina	Dick Durbin, Illinois, Ranking Member; Sheldon Whitehouse, Rhode Island; Amy Klobuchar, Minnesota; Chris Coons, Delaware; Richard Blumenthal, Connecticut; Mazie Hirono, Hawaii; Cory Booker, New Jersey; Alex Padilla, California; Peter Welch, Vermont; Adam Schiff, California

== Subcommittees ==
Subcommittee	Chair	Ranking Member
Antitrust, Competition Policy and Consumer Rights	Mike Lee (R-UT)	Cory Booker (D-NJ)
Border Security and Immigration	John Cornyn (R-TX)	Alex Padilla (D-CA)
The Constitution	Eric Schmitt (R-MO)	Peter Welch (D-VT)
Crime and Counterterrorism	Josh Hawley (R-MO)	Dick Durbin (D-IL)
Federal Courts, Oversight, Agency Action and Federal Rights	Ted Cruz (R-TX)	Sheldon Whitehouse (D-RI)
Intellectual Property	Thom Tillis (R-NC)	Adam Schiff (D-CA)
Privacy, Technology and the Law	Marsha Blackburn (R-TN)	Amy Klobuchar (D-MN)

== Committee leadership ==
=== Chairs ===
Name	Party	State	Start	End
Dudley Chase	Democratic-Republican	Vermont	1816	1817
John Crittenden	Democratic-Republican	Kentucky	1817	1818
James Burrill	Federalist	Rhode Island	1818	1819
William Smith	Democratic-Republican	South Carolina	1819	1823
Martin Van Buren	Democratic-Republican	New York	1823	1828
John Berrien	Jacksonian	Georgia	1828	1829
John Rowan	Democratic-Republican	Kentucky	1829	1831
William Marcy	Jacksonian	New York	1831	1832
William Wilkins	Jacksonian	Pennsylvania	1832	1833
John Clayton	Anti-Jacksonian	Delaware	1833	1836
Felix Grundy	Jacksonian	Tennessee	1836	1838
Garret Wall	Democratic	New Jersey	1838	1841
John Berrien	Whig	Georgia	1841	1845
Chester Ashley	Democratic	Arkansas	1845	1847
Andrew Butler	Democratic	South Carolina	1847	1857
James Bayard	Democratic	Delaware	1857	1861
Lyman Trumbull	Republican	Illinois	1861	1872
George Wright	Republican	Iowa	1872	
George Edmunds	Republican	Vermont	1872	1879
Allen Thurman	Democratic	Ohio	1879	1881
George Edmunds	Republican	Vermont	1881	1891
George Hoar	Republican	Massachusetts	1891	1893
James Pugh	Democratic	Alabama	1893	1895
George Hoar	Republican	Massachusetts	1895	1904
Orville Platt	Republican	Connecticut	1904	1905
Clarence Clark	Republican	Wyoming	1905	1912
Charles Culberson	Democratic	Texas	1912	1919
Knute Nelson	Republican	Minnesota	1919	1923
Frank Brandegee	Republican	Connecticut	1923	1924
Albert Cummins	Republican	Iowa	1924	1926
George Norris	Republican	Nebraska	1926	1933
Henry Ashurst	Democratic	Arizona	1933	1941
Frederick Van Nuys	Democratic	Indiana	1941	1945
Pat McCarran	Democratic	Nevada	1945	1947
Alexander Wiley	Republican	Wisconsin	1947	1949
Pat McCarran	Democratic	Nevada	1949	1953
William Langer	Republican	North Dakota	1953	1955
Harley Kilgore	Democratic	West Virginia	1955	1956
James Eastland	Democratic	Mississippi	1956	1978
Ted Kennedy	Democratic	Massachusetts	1978	1981
Strom Thurmond	Republican	South Carolina	1981	1987
Joe Biden	Democratic	Delaware	1987	1995
Orrin Hatch	Republican	Utah	1995	2001
Patrick Leahy	Democratic	Vermont	2001	
Orrin Hatch	Republican	Utah	2001	
Patrick Leahy	Democratic	Vermont	2001	2003
Orrin Hatch	Republican	Utah	2003	2005
Arlen Specter	Republican	Pennsylvania	2005	2007
Patrick Leahy	Democratic	Vermont	2007	2015
Chuck Grassley	Republican	Iowa	2015	2019
Lindsey Graham	Republican	South Carolina	2019	2021
Dick Durbin	Democratic	Illinois	2021	2025
Chuck Grassley	Republican	Iowa	2025	present

=== Ranking members ===
Name	Party	State	Start	End
Pat McCarran	Democratic	Nevada	1947	1949
Alexander Wiley	Republican	Wisconsin	1949	1953
Pat McCarran	Democratic	Nevada	1953	1955
Alexander Wiley	Republican	Wisconsin	1955	1963
Everett Dirksen	Republican	Illinois	1963	1969
Roman Hruska	Republican	Nebraska	1969	1976
Strom Thurmond	Republican	South Carolina	1977	1981
Joe Biden	Democratic	Delaware	1981	1987
Strom Thurmond	Republican	South Carolina	1987	1993
Orrin Hatch	Republican	Utah	1993	1995
Joe Biden	Democratic	Delaware	1995	1997
Patrick Leahy	Democratic	Vermont	1997	2001
Orrin Hatch	Republican	Utah	2001	2003
Patrick Leahy	Democratic	Vermont	2003	2007
Arlen Specter	Republican	Pennsylvania	2007	2009
Jeff Sessions	Republican	Alabama	2009	2011
Chuck Grassley	Republican	Iowa	2011	2015
Patrick Leahy	Democratic	Vermont	2015	2017
Dianne Feinstein	Democratic	California	2017	2021
Chuck Grassley	Republican	Iowa	2021	2023
Lindsey Graham	Republican	South Carolina	2023	2025
Dick Durbin	Democratic	Illinois	2025	present

== Historical committee rosters ==
=== 118th Congress ===
(January 3, 2023 – January 3, 2025)

Majority	Minority
Dick Durbin, Illinois, Chair; Dianne Feinstein, California (until September 29, 2023); Sheldon Whitehouse, Rhode Island; Amy Klobuchar, Minnesota; Chris Coons, Delaware; Richard Blumenthal, Connecticut; Mazie Hirono, Hawaii; Cory Booker, New Jersey; Alex Padilla, California; Jon Ossoff, Georgia; Peter Welch, Vermont; Laphonza Butler, California (October 17, 2023–December 8, 2024); Adam Schiff, California (from December 10, 2024)	Lindsey Graham, South Carolina, Ranking Member; Chuck Grassley, Iowa; John Cornyn, Texas; Mike Lee, Utah; Ted Cruz, Texas; Josh Hawley, Missouri; Tom Cotton, Arkansas; John Kennedy, Louisiana; Thom Tillis, North Carolina; Marsha Blackburn, Tennessee

Subcommittees

Subcommittee	Chair	Ranking Member
Competition Policy, Antitrust and Consumer Rights	Amy Klobuchar (D-MN)	Mike Lee (R-UT)
The Constitution	Dianne Feinstein (D-CA) (until September 29, 2023); Laphonza Butler (D-CA) (from October 17, 2023)	Ted Cruz (R-TX)
Criminal Justice and Counterterrorism	Cory Booker (D-NJ)	Tom Cotton (R-AR)
Federal Courts, Oversight, Agency Action and Federal Rights	Sheldon Whitehouse (D-RI)	John Kennedy (R-LA)
Human Rights and the Law	Jon Ossoff (D-GA)	Marsha Blackburn (R-TN)
Immigration, Citizenship and Border Safety	Alex Padilla (D-CA)	John Cornyn (R-TX)
Intellectual Property	Chris Coons (D-DE)	Thom Tillis (R-NC)
Privacy, Technology and the Law	Richard Blumenthal (D-CT)	Josh Hawley (R-MO)

=== 117th Congress ===
(January 3, 2021 – January 3, 2023)

Majority	Minority
Dick Durbin, Illinois, Chair; Patrick Leahy, Vermont; Dianne Feinstein, California; Sheldon Whitehouse, Rhode Island; Amy Klobuchar, Minnesota; Chris Coons, Delaware; Richard Blumenthal, Connecticut; Mazie Hirono, Hawaii; Cory Booker, New Jersey; Alex Padilla, California; Jon Ossoff, Georgia	Chuck Grassley, Iowa, Ranking Member; Lindsey Graham, South Carolina; John Cornyn, Texas; Mike Lee, Utah; Ted Cruz, Texas; Ben Sasse, Nebraska; Josh Hawley, Missouri; Tom Cotton, Arkansas; John Kennedy, Louisiana; Thom Tillis, North Carolina; Marsha Blackburn, Tennessee

Subcommittees

Subcommittee	Chair	Ranking Member
Competition Policy, Antitrust and Consumer Rights	Amy Klobuchar (D-MN)	Mike Lee (R-UT)
The Constitution	Richard Blumenthal (D-CT)	Ted Cruz (R-TX)
Criminal Justice and Counterterrorism	Cory Booker (D-NJ)	Tom Cotton (R-AR)
Federal Courts, Oversight, Agency Action and Federal Rights	Sheldon Whitehouse (D-RI)	John Kennedy (R-LA)
Human Rights and the Law	Dianne Feinstein (D-CA)	Josh Hawley (R-MO)
Immigration, Citizenship and Border Safety	Alex Padilla (D-CA)	John Cornyn (R-TX)
Intellectual Property	Patrick Leahy (D-VT)	Thom Tillis (R-NC)
Privacy, Technology and the Law	Chris Coons (D-DE)	Ben Sasse (R-NE)

=== 116th Congress ===
(January 3, 2019 – January 3, 2021)

Majority	Minority
Lindsey Graham, South Carolina, Chair; Chuck Grassley, Iowa; John Cornyn, Texas; Mike Lee, Utah; Ted Cruz, Texas; Ben Sasse, Nebraska; Josh Hawley, Missouri; Thom Tillis, North Carolina; Joni Ernst, Iowa; Mike Crapo, Idaho; John Kennedy, Louisiana; Marsha Blackburn, Tennessee	Dianne Feinstein, California, Ranking Member; Patrick Leahy, Vermont; Dick Durbin, Illinois; Sheldon Whitehouse, Rhode Island; Amy Klobuchar, Minnesota; Chris Coons, Delaware; Richard Blumenthal, Connecticut; Mazie Hirono, Hawaii; Cory Booker, New Jersey; Kamala Harris, California

Subcommittees

Subcommittee	Chair	Ranking member
Antitrust, Competition Policy and Consumer Rights	Mike Lee (R-UT)	Amy Klobuchar (D-MN)
Border Security and Immigration	John Cornyn (R-TX)	Dick Durbin (D-IL)
The Constitution	Ted Cruz (R-TX)	Mazie Hirono (D-HI)
Crime and Terrorism	Josh Hawley (R-MO)	Sheldon Whitehouse (D-RI)
Intellectual Property	Thom Tillis (R-NC)	Chris Coons (D-DE)
Oversight, Agency Action, Federal Rights and Federal Courts	Ben Sasse (R-NE)	Richard Blumenthal (D-CT)

=== 115th Congress ===
(January 3, 2017 – January 3, 2019)

Majority	Minority
Chuck Grassley, Iowa, Chair; Orrin Hatch, Utah; Lindsey Graham, South Carolina; John Cornyn, Texas; Mike Lee, Utah; Ted Cruz, Texas; Ben Sasse, Nebraska; Jeff Flake, Arizona; Mike Crapo, Idaho; Thom Tillis, North Carolina; John Kennedy, Louisiana	Dianne Feinstein, California, Ranking Member; Patrick Leahy, Vermont; Dick Durbin, Illinois; Sheldon Whitehouse, Rhode Island; Amy Klobuchar, Minnesota; Chris Coons, Delaware; Richard Blumenthal, Connecticut; Mazie Hirono, Hawaii; Cory Booker, New Jersey (from January 9, 2018); Kamala Harris, California (from January 9, 2018); Al Franken, Minnesota (until January 2, 2018)

In January 2018, the Democratic minority had their number of seats increase from 9 to 10 upon the election of Doug Jones (D-AL), changing the 52–48 Republican majority to 51–49. On January 2, 2018, Al Franken, who had been a member of the committee, resigned from the Senate following accusations of sexual misconduct.

Subcommittees

Subcommittee	Chair	Ranking member
Antitrust, Competition Policy and Consumer Rights	Mike Lee (R-UT)	Amy Klobuchar (D-MN)
Border Security and Immigration	John Cornyn (R-TX)	Dick Durbin (D-IL)
Crime and Terrorism	Lindsey Graham (R-SC)	Sheldon Whitehouse (D-RI)
Oversight, Agency Action, Federal Rights and Federal Courts	Ben Sasse (R-NE)	Richard Blumenthal (D-CT) (from January 9, 2018); Chris Coons (D-DE) (until January 9, 2018)
Privacy, Technology and the Law	Jeff Flake (R-AZ)	Chris Coons (D-DE) (from January 9, 2018); Al Franken (D-MN) (until January 2, 2018)
The Constitution	Ted Cruz (R-TX)	Mazie Hirono (D-HI) (from January 9, 2018); Richard Blumenthal (D-CT) (until January 9, 2018)

=== 114th Congress ===
(January 3, 2015 – January 3, 2017)

Majority	Minority
Chuck Grassley, Iowa, Chair; Orrin Hatch, Utah; Jeff Sessions, Alabama; Lindsey Graham, South Carolina; John Cornyn, Texas; Mike Lee, Utah; Ted Cruz, Texas; Jeff Flake, Arizona; David Vitter, Louisiana; David Perdue, Georgia; Thom Tillis, North Carolina	Patrick Leahy, Vermont, Ranking Member; Dianne Feinstein, California; Chuck Schumer, New York; Dick Durbin, Illinois; Sheldon Whitehouse, Rhode Island; Amy Klobuchar, Minnesota; Al Franken, Minnesota; Chris Coons, Delaware; Richard Blumenthal, Connecticut

Subcommittees

Subcommittee	Chair	Ranking member
Antitrust, Competition Policy and Consumer Rights	Mike Lee (R-UT)	Amy Klobuchar (D-MN)
Crime and Terrorism	Lindsey Graham (R-SC)	Sheldon Whitehouse (D-RI)
Immigration and the National Interest	Jeff Sessions (R-AL)	Chuck Schumer (D-NY)
Oversight, Agency Action, Federal Rights and Federal Courts	Ted Cruz (R-TX)	Chris Coons (D-DE)
Privacy, Technology and the Law	Jeff Flake (R-AZ)	Al Franken (D-MN)
The Constitution	John Cornyn (R-TX)	Dick Durbin (D-IL)

=== 113th Congress ===
(January 3, 2013 – January 3, 2015)

Majority	Minority
Patrick Leahy, Vermont, Chair; Dianne Feinstein, California; Chuck Schumer, New York; Dick Durbin, Illinois; Sheldon Whitehouse, Rhode Island; Amy Klobuchar, Minnesota; Al Franken, Minnesota; Chris Coons, Delaware; Richard Blumenthal, Connecticut; Mazie Hirono, Hawaii	Chuck Grassley, Iowa, Ranking Member; Orrin Hatch, Utah; Jeff Sessions, Alabama; Lindsey Graham, South Carolina; John Cornyn, Texas; Mike Lee, Utah; Ted Cruz, Texas; Jeff Flake, Arizona

Subcommittees

Subcommittee	Chair	Ranking member
Antitrust, Competition Policy and Consumer Rights	Amy Klobuchar (D-MN)	Mike Lee (R-UT)
Bankruptcy and the Courts	Chris Coons (D-DE)	Jeff Sessions (R-AL)
Crime and Terrorism	Sheldon Whitehouse (D-RI)	Lindsey Graham (R-SC)
Immigration, Refugees and Border Security	Chuck Schumer (D-NY)	John Cornyn (R-TX)
Oversight, Federal Rights and Agency Action	Richard Blumenthal (D-CT)	Orrin Hatch (R-UT)
Privacy, Technology and the Law	Al Franken (D-MN)	Jeff Flake (R-AZ)
The Constitution, Civil Rights and Human Rights	Dick Durbin (D-IL)	Ted Cruz (R-TX)

=== 112th Congress ===
(January 3, 2011 – January 3, 2013)

Majority	Minority
Patrick Leahy, Vermont, Chair; Herb Kohl, Wisconsin; Dianne Feinstein, California; Chuck Schumer, New York; Dick Durbin, Illinois; Sheldon Whitehouse, Rhode Island; Amy Klobuchar, Minnesota; Al Franken, Minnesota; Chris Coons, Delaware; Richard Blumenthal, Connecticut	Chuck Grassley, Iowa, Ranking Member; Orrin Hatch, Utah; Jon Kyl, Arizona; Jeff Sessions, Alabama; Lindsey Graham, South Carolina; Mike Lee, Utah; Tom Coburn, Oklahoma

Subcommittees

Subcommittee	Chair	Ranking member
Administrative Oversight and the Courts	Amy Klobuchar (D-MN)	Jeff Sessions (R-AL)
United States Senate Judiciary Subcommittee on Antitrust, Competition Policy and Consumer Rights	Herb Kohl (D-WI)	Mike Lee (R-UT)
Crime and Terrorism	Sheldon Whitehouse (D-RI)	Jon Kyl (R-AZ)
Immigration, Refugees and Border Security	Chuck Schumer (D-NY)	John Cornyn (R-TX)
Privacy, Technology and the Law	Al Franken (D-MN)	Tom Coburn (R-OK)
The Constitution, Civil Rights and Human Rights	Dick Durbin (D-IL)	Lindsey Graham (R-SC)

=== 111th Congress ===
(January 3, 2009 – January 3, 2011)

Majority	Minority
Patrick Leahy, Vermont, Chair; Herb Kohl, Wisconsin; Dianne Feinstein, California; Russ Feingold, Wisconsin; Chuck Schumer, New York; Dick Durbin, Illinois; Ben Cardin, Maryland; Sheldon Whitehouse, Rhode Island; Amy Klobuchar, Minnesota; Ted Kaufman, Delaware (until November 15, 2010); Arlen Specter, Pennsylvania; Al Franken, Minnesota; Chris Coons, Delaware (from November 15, 2010)	Jeff Sessions, Alabama, Ranking Member; Orrin Hatch, Utah; Chuck Grassley, Iowa; Jon Kyl, Arizona; Lindsey Graham, South Carolina; John Cornyn, Texas; Tom Coburn, Oklahoma

Subcommittees

Subcommittee	Chair	Ranking member
Administrative Oversight and the Courts	Sheldon Whitehouse (D-RI)	Jeff Sessions (R-AL)
Antitrust, Competition Policy and Consumer Rights	Herb Kohl (D-WI)	Orrin Hatch (R-UT)
Crime and Drugs	Arlen Specter (D-PA)	Lindsey Graham (R-SC)
Human Rights and the Law	Dick Durbin (D-IL)	Tom Coburn (R-OK)
Immigration, Refugees and Border Security	Chuck Schumer (D-NY)	John Cornyn (R-TX)
Terrorism and Homeland Security	Ben Cardin (D-MD)	Jon Kyl (R-AZ)
The Constitution	Russ Feingold (D-WI)	Tom Coburn (R-OK)

== See also ==
- United States House Committee on the Judiciary
- List of United States Senate committees
