= United States Senate Judiciary Subcommittee on Human Rights and the Law =

US Senate subcommittee of the Senate Judiciary Committee

The United States Senate Judiciary Subcommittee on Human Rights and the Law is one of eight subcommittees within the Senate Judiciary Committee. Its creation was announced on February 14, 2021, by chairman Dick Durbin and ranking member Chuck Grassley. Created during the 117th Congress when Democrats took control of the Senate, the subcommittee is chaired by Jon Ossoff, ranking member is Marsha Blackburn.

== Jurisdiction ==
1. Human rights laws and policies
2. Enforcement and implementation of human rights laws
3. Judicial proceedings regarding human rights laws
4. Judicial and executive branch interpretations of human rights laws

== 118th Congress ==
Majority	Minority
Jon Ossoff, Georgia, Chair; Dianne Feinstein, California (until September 29, 2023); Richard Blumenthal, Connecticut; Peter Welch, Vermont; Laphonza Butler, California (from October 17, 2023)	Marsha Blackburn, Tennessee, Ranking Member; John Kennedy, Louisiana; Josh Hawley, Missouri

== Historical subcommittee rosters ==
=== 117th Congress ===
Majority	Minority
Dianne Feinstein, California, Chair; Chris Coons, Delaware; Richard Blumenthal, Connecticut	Josh Hawley, Missouri, Ranking Member; Ben Sasse, Nebraska; John Kennedy, Louisiana
