= United States Senate Judiciary Subcommittee on the Constitution =

The Senate Judiciary Subcommittee on the Constitution is one of eight subcommittees within the Senate Judiciary Committee. The subcommittee was best known in the 1970s as the committee of Sam Ervin, whose investigations and lobbying — together with Frank Church and the Church Commission — led to the passage of the Foreign Intelligence Surveillance Act.

== Jurisdiction ==
From the Senate Judiciary Committee website:

- (1) Amendments to the United States Constitution
- (2) Civil rights oversight
- (3) Property rights
- (4) Federal-state relations
- (5) Individual rights
- (6) Commemorative Congressional Resolutions
- (7) Interstate compacts

== Members, 119th Congress ==
Majority	Minority
Eric Schmitt, Missouri, Chair; John Cornyn, Texas; Mike Lee, Utah; Ted Cruz, Texas; Josh Hawley, Missouri; John Kennedy, Louisiana; Marsha Blackburn, Tennessee	Peter Welch, Vermont, Ranking Member; Sheldon Whitehouse, Rhode Island; Mazie Hirono, Hawaii; Cory Booker, New Jersey; Alex Padilla, California; Adam Schiff, California

== Historical subcommittee rosters ==
=== 118th Congress ===
Majority	Minority
Dianne Feinstein, California, Chair (until September 29, 2023); Laphonza Butler, California, Chair (from October 3, 2023); Richard Blumenthal, Connecticut; Cory Booker, New Jersey; Jon Ossoff, Georgia	Ted Cruz, Texas, Ranking Member; John Cornyn, Texas; Mike Lee, Utah

=== 117th Congress ===
Majority	Minority
Richard Blumenthal, Connecticut, Chair; Dianne Feinstein, California; Sheldon Whitehouse, Rhode Island; Jon Ossoff, Georgia	Ted Cruz, Texas, Ranking Member; John Cornyn, Texas; Mike Lee, Utah; Ben Sasse, Nebraska

=== 116th Congress ===
Majority	Minority
Ted Cruz, Texas, Chair; John Cornyn, Texas; Mike Crapo, Idaho; Mike Lee, Utah; Ben Sasse, Nebraska; Marsha Blackburn, Tennessee	Mazie Hirono, Hawaii, Ranking Member; Dick Durbin, Illinois; Sheldon Whitehouse, Rhode Island; Chris Coons, Delaware; Kamala Harris, California

== See also ==
- United States House Judiciary Subcommittee on the Constitution
