= United States Senate Judiciary Subcommittee on Border Security and Immigration =

The Senate Judiciary Subcommittee on Border Security and Immigration is one of eight subcommittees within the Senate Judiciary Committee during the 114th Congress. The judiciary subcommittee on immigration was called the Subcommittee on Immigration, Citizenship and Border Safety for the 117th–118th Congresses and was called Immigration, Refugees, and Border Security during the 113th Congress.

== Jurisdiction ==
Jurisdiction: (1) Immigration, citizenship, and refugee laws; (2) Oversight of the Department of Homeland Security U.S. Citizenship and Immigration Services and the immigration functions of the U.S Customs and Border Protection, U.S. Immigration and Customs Enforcement, and Directorate of Border and Transportation Security; (3) Oversight of the immigration-related functions of the Department of Justice, the Department of State, the Department of Health and Human Services Office of Refugee Resettlement, and the Department of Labor; (4) Oversight of international migration and refugee laws and policy: and (5) Private immigration relief bills.

== Members, 119th Congress ==
Majority	Minority
John Cornyn, Texas, Chair; Lindsey Graham, South Carolina; Ted Cruz, Texas; Thom Tillis, North Carolina; John Kennedy, Louisiana; Katie Britt, Alabama; Ashley Moody, Florida	Alex Padilla, California, Ranking Member; Sheldon Whitehouse, Rhode Island; Amy Klobuchar, Minnesota; Chris Coons, Delaware; Mazie Hirono, Hawaii; Cory Booker, New Jersey

== Historical subcommittee rosters ==
=== 118th Congress ===
Majority	Minority
Alex Padilla, California, Chair; Sheldon Whitehouse, Rhode Island; Amy Klobuchar, Minnesota; Chris Coons, Delaware; Richard Blumenthal, Connecticut; Peter Welch, Vermont; Cory Booker, New Jersey	John Cornyn, Texas, Ranking Member; Chuck Grassley, Iowa; Ted Cruz, Texas; Tom Cotton, Arkansas; Thom Tillis, North Carolina; Marsha Blackburn, Tennessee

=== 117th Congress ===
Majority	Minority
Alex Padilla, California, Chair; Dianne Feinstein, California; Amy Klobuchar, Minnesota; Chris Coons, Delaware; Richard Blumenthal, Connecticut; Mazie Hirono, Hawaii; Cory Booker, New Jersey	John Cornyn, Texas, Ranking Member; Lindsey Graham, South Carolina; Ted Cruz, Texas; Tom Cotton, Arkansas; John Kennedy, Louisiana; Thom Tillis, North Carolina; Marsha Blackburn, Tennessee

=== 116th Congress ===
Majority	Minority
John Cornyn, Texas, Chair; Thom Tillis, North Carolina; John Kennedy, Louisiana; Chuck Grassley, Iowa; Ted Cruz, Texas; Joni Ernst, Iowa; Lindsey Graham, South Carolina; Mike Lee, Utah; Josh Hawley, Missouri	Dick Durbin, Illinois, Ranking Member; Dianne Feinstein, California; Patrick Leahy, Vermont; Amy Klobuchar, Minnesota; Cory Booker, New Jersey; Richard Blumenthal, Connecticut; Mazie Hirono, Hawaii; Chris Coons, Delaware

== See also ==
- United States House Judiciary Subcommittee on Immigration, Border Security, and Claims
