= United States Senate Judiciary Subcommittee on Antitrust, Competition Policy and Consumer Rights =

US Senate subcommittee

The United States Senate Judiciary Subcommittee on Antitrust, Competition Policy and Consumer Rights is one of eight subcommittees within the Senate Judiciary Committee. It was previously known as the Subcommittee on Antitrust, Competition Policy and Consumer Rights. The Subcommittee's counterpart in the House of Representatives is the House Judiciary Subcommittee on Antitrust, Commercial and Administrative Law.

== Jurisdiction ==
According to its webpage:

1. Oversight of antitrust and competition policy, including the Sherman, Clayton, and Federal Trade Commission Acts;
2. Oversight of antitrust enforcement and competition policy at the Justice Department;
3. Oversight of antitrust enforcement and competition policy at the Federal Trade Commission;
4. Oversight of competition policy at other federal agencies.

== Members, 119th Congress ==
| Majority | Minority |
|---|---|
| Mike Lee, Utah, Chair; Josh Hawley, Missouri; Thom Tillis, North Carolina; Katie Britt, Alabama; Ashley Moody, Florida; Eric Schmitt, Missouri | Cory Booker, New Jersey, Ranking Member; Amy Klobuchar, Minnesota; Richard Blumenthal, Connecticut; Peter Welch, Vermont; Adam Schiff, California |

== Historical subcommittee rosters ==
=== 118th Congress ===
| Majority | Minority |
|---|---|
| Amy Klobuchar, Minnesota, Chair; Sheldon Whitehouse, Rhode Island; Richard Blumenthal, Connecticut; Cory Booker, New Jersey; Chris Coons, Delaware; Mazie Hirono, Hawaii; Peter Welch, Vermont | Mike Lee, Utah, Ranking Member; Chuck Grassley, Iowa; Josh Hawley, Missouri; Tom Cotton, Arkansas; Thom Tillis, North Carolina; Marsha Blackburn, Tennessee |

=== 117th Congress ===
| Majority | Minority |
|---|---|
| Amy Klobuchar, Minnesota, Chair; Patrick Leahy, Vermont; Richard Blumenthal, Connecticut; Cory Booker, New Jersey; Jon Ossoff, Georgia | Mike Lee, Utah, Ranking Member; Josh Hawley, Missouri; Tom Cotton, Arkansas; Thom Tillis, North Carolina; Marsha Blackburn, Tennessee |

=== 116th Congress ===
| Majority | Minority |
|---|---|
| Mike Lee, Utah, Chair; Chuck Grassley, Iowa; Josh Hawley, Missouri; Mike Crapo, Idaho; Marsha Blackburn, Tennessee | Amy Klobuchar, Minnesota, Ranking Member; Patrick Leahy, Vermont; Richard Blumenthal, Connecticut; Cory Booker, New Jersey |

== See also ==
- United States House Judiciary Subcommittee on the Administrative State, Regulatory Reform, and Antitrust
