= United States Senate Judiciary Subcommittee on Federal Courts, Oversight, Agency Action and Federal Rights =

The Senate Judiciary Subcommittee on Federal Courts, Oversight, Agency Action and Federal Rights is one of seven subcommittees within the United States Senate Committee on the Judiciary. It was created at the beginning of the 113th Congress. It was previously known as the Subcommittee on Oversight, Agency Action, Federal Rights and Federal Courts

== Jurisdiction ==
(1) Federal court jurisdiction, administration and management; (2) Rules of evidence and procedure; (3) Creation of new courts and judgeships; (4) Bankruptcy; (5) Legal reform and liability issues; (6) Local courts in territories and possessions; (7) Administrative practices and procedures including agency rulemaking and adjudication; (8) Judicial review of agency action; (9) Third party enforcement of federal rights; (10) Oversight of the Department of Justice grant programs, as well as government waste and abuse; (11) private relief bills other than immigration; and (12) Oversight of the Foreign Claims Settlement Act.

== Members, 119th Congress ==
Majority	Minority
Ted Cruz, Texas, Chair; Lindsey Graham, South Carolina; Mike Lee, Utah; Thom Tillis, North Carolina; John Kennedy, Louisiana; Eric Schmitt, Missouri	Sheldon Whitehouse, Rhode Island, Ranking Member; Richard Blumenthal, Connecticut; Mazie Hirono, Hawaii; Alex Padilla, California; Peter Welch, Vermont

== Historical subcommittee rosters ==
=== 118th Congress ===
Majority	Minority
Sheldon Whitehouse, Rhode Island, Chair; Dianne Feinstein, California (until September 29, 2023); Richard Blumenthal, Connecticut; Mazie Hirono, Hawaii; Cory Booker, New Jersey; Alex Padilla, California; Peter Welch, Vermont; Laphonza Butler, California (from October 17, 2023)	John Kennedy, Louisiana, Ranking Member; Chuck Grassley, Iowa; Mike Lee, Utah; Ted Cruz, Texas; Josh Hawley, Missouri; Thom Tillis, North Carolina

=== 117th Congress ===
Majority	Minority
Sheldon Whitehouse, Rhode Island, Chair; Patrick Leahy, Vermont; Mazie Hirono, Hawaii; Cory Booker, New Jersey; Alex Padilla, California; Jon Ossoff, Georgia	John Kennedy, Louisiana, Ranking Member; Lindsey Graham, South Carolina; Mike Lee, Utah; Ted Cruz, Texas; Ben Sasse, Nebraska; Thom Tillis, North Carolina

=== 116th Congress ===
Majority	Minority
Ben Sasse, Nebraska, Chair; Chuck Grassley, Iowa; Mike Crapo, Idaho; John Neely Kennedy, Louisiana; Joni Ernst, Iowa; Thom Tillis, North Carolina	Richard Blumenthal, Connecticut, Ranking Member; Patrick Leahy, Vermont; Sheldon Whitehouse, Rhode Island; Amy Klobuchar, Minnesota; Mazie Hirono, Hawaii
