= United States Congressional Joint Economic Committee =

Committee was established as a part of the Employment Act of 1946

Joint Economic Committee
Standing committee
- Active United States Congress; 119th Congress

History
- Formed: 1946

Leadership
- Chair: David Schweikert (R); Since January 3, 2025
- Vice Chair: Eric Schmitt (R); Since January 3, 2025

Structure
- Seats: 20
- Political parties: Majority (12): Republican (6); Republican (6); Minority (8): Democratic (4); Democratic (4)

Website
- jec.senate.gov

The Joint Economic Committee (JEC) is one of four standing joint committees of the U.S. Congress. The committee was established as a part of the Employment Act of 1946, which deemed the committee responsible for reporting the current economic condition of the United States and for making suggestions for improvement to the economy. The JEC is currently chaired by Representative David Schweikert of Arizona.

== Jurisdiction ==
- Study the implications of the Economic Report of the President
- Seek ways to coordinate programs involved in the Report
- File an annual report relating to its study of these implications and programs with the Senate, the House of Representatives, and all Congressional committees having legislative duties relating to the Report
- Make other reports and recommendations to the Senate and the House as the committee members see fit
- Hold hearings on the report and other economic matters as the committee members see fit.

== Members, 119th Congress ==
	Majority	Minority
Senate members	Eric Schmitt, Missouri, Vice Chair; Tom Cotton, Arkansas; Ted Budd, North Carolina; Dave McCormick, Pennsylvania; Marsha Blackburn, Tennessee; Ashley Moody, Florida	Maggie Hassan, New Hampshire, Ranking Member; Amy Klobuchar, Minnesota; Martin Heinrich, New Mexico; Mark Kelly, Arizona
House members	David Schweikert, Arizona, Chair; Jodey Arrington, Texas; Ron Estes, Kansas; Lloyd Smucker, Pennsylvania; Nicole Malliotakis, New York; Victoria Spartz, Indiana	Don Beyer, Virginia, Vice Ranking Member; Gwen Moore, Wisconsin; Sean Casten, Illinois; Dave Min, California

== Committee leadership ==
The chair and vice chair rotate between the House and Senate majority each Congressional term, while the ranking member and vice ranking member rotate between the House and Senate minority.

=== Chairs ===
Name	Party	State	Start	End	Chamber
Robert Taft	Republican	Ohio	1947	1949	Senate
Joseph O'Mahoney	Democratic	Wyoming	1949	1953	Senate
Jesse Wolcott	Republican	Michigan	1953	1955	House
Paul Douglas	Democratic	Illinois	1955	1957	Senate
Wright Patman	Democratic	Texas	1957	1959	House
Paul Douglas	Democratic	Illinois	1959	1961	Senate
Wright Patman	Democratic	Texas	1961	1963	House
Paul Douglas	Democratic	Illinois	1963	1965	Senate
Wright Patman	Democratic	Texas	1965	1967	House
William Proxmire	Republican	Wisconsin	1967	1969	Senate
Wright Patman	Democratic	Texas	1969	1971	House
William Proxmire	Republican	Wisconsin	1971	1973	Senate
Wright Patman	Democratic	Texas	1973	1975	House
Hubert Humphrey	Democratic	Minnesota	1975	1977	Senate
Richard Bolling	Democratic	Missouri	1977	1979	House
Lloyd Bentsen	Democratic	Texas	1979	1981	Senate
Henry Reuss	Democratic	Wisconsin	1981	1983	House
Roger Jepsen	Republican	Iowa	1983	1985	Senate
Dave Obey	Democratic	Wisconsin	1985	1987	House
Paul Sarbanes	Democratic	Maryland	1987	1989	Senate
Lee Hamilton	Republican	Indiana	1989	1991	House
Paul Sarbanes	Democratic	Maryland	1991	1993	Senate
Lee Hamilton	Republican	Indiana	1993	1995	House
Connie Mack III	Republican	Florida	1995	1997	Senate
Jim Saxton	Republican	New Jersey	1997	1999	House
Connie Mack III	Republican	Florida	1999	2001	Senate
Jim Saxton	Republican	New Jersey	2001	2003	House
Bob Bennett	Republican	Utah	2003	2005	Senate
Jim Saxton	Republican	New Jersey	2005	2007	House
Chuck Schumer	Democratic	New York	2007	2009	Senate
Carolyn Maloney	Democratic	New York	2009	2011	House
Bob Casey	Democratic	Pennsylvania	2011	2013	Senate
Kevin Brady	Republican	Texas	2013	2015	House
Dan Coats	Republican	Indiana	2015	2017	Senate
Pat Tiberi	Republican	Ohio	2017	2018	House
Erik Paulsen	Republican	Minnesota	2018	2019	House
Mike Lee	Republican	Utah	2019	2021	Senate
Don Beyer	Democratic	Virginia	2021	2023	House
Martin Heinrich	Democratic	New Mexico	2023	2025	Senate
David Schweikert	Republican	Arizona	2025	present	House

=== Vice Chairs ===
Name	Party	State	Start	End	Chamber
Mike Lee	Republican	Utah	2017	2019	Senate
Carolyn Maloney	Democratic	New York	2019	2021	House
Martin Heinrich	Democratic	New Mexico	2021	2023	Senate
David Schweikert	Republican	Arizona	2023	2025	House
Eric Schmitt	Republican	Missouri	2025	present	Senate

=== Ranking Members ===
Name	Party	State	Start	End	Chamber
Carolyn Maloney	Democratic	New York	2015	2017	House
Martin Heinrich	Democratic	New Mexico	2017	2019	Senate
David Schweikert	Republican	Arizona	2019	2021	House
Mike Lee	Republican	Utah	2021	2023	Senate
Don Beyer	Democratic	Virginia	2023	2025	House
Maggie Hassan	Democratic	New Hampshire	2025	present	Senate

=== Vice Ranking Members ===
Name	Party	State	Start	End	Chamber
Carolyn Maloney	Democratic	New York	2017	2019	House
Martin Heinrich	Democratic	New Mexico	2019	2021	Senate
David Schweikert	Republican	Arizona	2021	2023	House
Mike Lee	Republican	Utah	2023	2025	Senate
Don Beyer	Democratic	Virginia	2025	present	House

== Historical committee rosters ==
=== 118th Congress ===
	Majority	Minority
Senate members	Martin Heinrich, New Mexico, Chair; Amy Klobuchar, Minnesota; Maggie Hassan, New Hampshire; Mark Kelly, Arizona; John Fetterman, Pennsylvania; Peter Welch, Vermont	Mike Lee, Utah, Vice Ranking Member; Tom Cotton, Arkansas; JD Vance, Ohio; Eric Schmitt, Missouri
House members	David Schweikert, Arizona, Vice Chair; Jodey Arrington, Texas; Ron Estes, Kansas; Drew Ferguson, Georgia; Lloyd Smucker, Pennsylvania; Nicole Malliotakis, New York	Don Beyer, Virginia, Ranking Member; David Trone, Maryland; Gwen Moore, Wisconsin; Katie Porter, California

=== 117th Congress ===
	Majority	Minority
Senate members	Martin Heinrich, New Mexico, Vice Chair; Amy Klobuchar, Minnesota; Maggie Hassan, New Hampshire; Raphael Warnock, Georgia; Mark Kelly, Arizona	Mike Lee, Utah, Ranking Member; Tom Cotton, Arkansas; Rob Portman, Ohio; Bill Cassidy, Louisiana; Ted Cruz, Texas
House members	Don Beyer, Virginia, Chair; David Trone, Maryland; Joyce Beatty, Ohio; Mark Pocan, Wisconsin; Scott Peters, California; Sharice Davids, Kansas	David Schweikert, Arizona, Vice Ranking Member; Jaime Herrera Beutler, Washington; Jodey Arrington, Texas; Ron Estes, Kansas

=== 116th Congress ===
	Majority	Minority
Senate members	Mike Lee, Utah, Chair; Tom Cotton, Arkansas; Rob Portman, Ohio; Bill Cassidy, Louisiana; Ted Cruz, Texas; Kelly Loeffler, Georgia	Martin Heinrich, New Mexico, Vice Ranking Member; Amy Klobuchar, Minnesota; Gary Peters, Michigan; Maggie Hassan, New Hampshire
House members	Carolyn Maloney, New York, Vice Chair; Don Beyer, Virginia; Denny Heck, Washington; David Trone, Maryland; Joyce Beatty, Ohio; Lois Frankel, Florida	David Schweikert, Arizona, Ranking Member; Darin LaHood, Illinois; Kenny Marchant, Texas; Jaime Herrera Beutler, Washington

=== 115th Congress ===
	Majority	Minority
Senate members	Mike Lee, Utah, Vice Chair; Tom Cotton, Arkansas; Ben Sasse, Nebraska; Rob Portman, Ohio; Ted Cruz, Texas; Bill Cassidy, Louisiana	Martin Heinrich, New Mexico, Ranking Member; Amy Klobuchar, Minnesota; Gary Peters, Michigan; Maggie Hassan, New Hampshire
House members	~~Pat Tiberi, Ohio~~, Chair (until January 11, 2018); Erik Paulsen, Minnesota, Chair (from January 11, 2018); David Schweikert, Arizona; Barbara Comstock, Virginia; Darin LaHood, Illinois; Francis Rooney, Florida	Carolyn Maloney, New York, Vice Ranking Member; John Delaney, Maryland; Alma Adams, North Carolina; Don Beyer, Virginia
