= United States Senate Judiciary Subcommittee on Crime and Counterterrorism =

The Senate Judiciary Subcommittee on Crime and Counterterrorism is one of six subcommittees within the Senate Judiciary Committee. It was previously known as the Subcommittee on Crime and Terrorism and the Subcommittee on Criminal Justice and Counterterrorism

== Jurisdiction ==
- Oversight of the Department of Justice's

- Criminal Division;
- Drug Enforcement Administration;
- Executive Office of the U.S. Attorneys;
- Violence Against Women's Office; and
- U.S. Marshals Office;

- Oversight of the U.S. Sentencing Commission;
- Youth violence and directly related issues;
- Federal programs under the Juvenile Justice and Delinquency Prevention Act of 1974, as Amended (including the Runaway and Homeless Youth Act), and
- Criminal justice and victim's rights legislation;
- Oversight of the Office of National Drug Control Policy;
- Oversight of Community Oriented Policing Office and Related law Enforcement grants; and
- Oversight of the U.S. Secret Service.

== Members, 119th Congress ==
Majority	Minority
Josh Hawley, Missouri, Chair; Lindsey Graham, South Carolina; John Cornyn, Texas; Ted Cruz, Texas; Marsha Blackburn, Tennessee; Katie Britt, Alabama	Dick Durbin, Illinois, Ranking Member; Amy Klobuchar, Minnesota; Chris Coons, Delaware; Richard Blumenthal, Connecticut; Cory Booker, New Jersey

== Historical subcommittee rosters ==
=== 118th Congress ===
Majority	Minority
Cory Booker, New Jersey, Chair; Dianne Feinstein, California (until September 29, 2023); Sheldon Whitehouse, Rhode Island; Amy Klobuchar, Minnesota; Chris Coons, Delaware; Alex Padilla, California; Jon Ossoff, Georgia; Laphonza Butler, California (from October 17, 2023)	Tom Cotton, Arkansas, Ranking Member; Chuck Grassley, Iowa; John Cornyn, Texas; Mike Lee, Utah; Ted Cruz, Texas; John Kennedy, Louisiana

=== Members, 117th Congress ===
Majority	Minority
Cory Booker, New Jersey, Chair; Patrick Leahy, Vermont; Dianne Feinstein, California; Sheldon Whitehouse, Rhode Island; Amy Klobuchar, Minnesota; Alex Padilla, California; Jon Ossoff, Georgia	Tom Cotton, Arkansas, Ranking Member; Lindsey Graham, South Carolina; John Cornyn, Texas; Mike Lee, Utah; Ted Cruz, Texas; Josh Hawley, Missouri; John Kennedy, Louisiana

=== Members, 116th Congress ===
Majority	Minority
Josh Hawley, Missouri, Chair; John Cornyn, Texas; Ted Cruz, Texas; Joni Ernst, Iowa; John Kennedy, Louisiana; Lindsey Graham, South Carolina	Sheldon Whitehouse, Rhode Island, Ranking Member; Dick Durbin, Illinois; Amy Klobuchar, Minnesota; Chris Coons, Delaware; Cory Booker, New Jersey; Dianne Feinstein, California

== See also ==
- U.S. House Judiciary Subcommittee on Crime, Terrorism, and Homeland Security
