= United States Senate Judiciary Subcommittee on Privacy, Technology and the Law =

US Senate subcommittee of the Senate Judiciary Committee

The United States Senate Judiciary Subcommittee on Privacy, Technology and the Law is one of seven subcommittees within the Senate Judiciary Committee. Created at the start of the 112th Congress, it was disbanded at the beginning of the 116th Congress, but brought back during the 117th Congress. The current chair of the subcommittee is Senator Marsha Blackburn (R-TN).

== Jurisdiction ==
The committee's jurisdiction extended to:

1. Oversight of laws and policies governing the collection, protection, use and dissemination of commercial information by the private sector, including online behavioral advertising, privacy within social networking websites and other online privacy issues;
2. Enforcement and implementation of commercial information privacy laws and policies;
3. Use of technology by the private sector to protect privacy, enhance transparency and encourage innovation;
4. Privacy standards for the collection, retention, use and dissemination of personally identifiable commercial information; and
5. Privacy implications of new or emerging technologies.

== Members, 119th Congress ==
Majority	Minority
Marsha Blackburn, Tennessee, Chair; Lindsey Graham, South Carolina; John Cornyn, Texas; Josh Hawley, Missouri; John Kennedy, Louisiana; Ashley Moody, Florida	Amy Klobuchar, Minnesota, Ranking Member; Chris Coons, Delaware; Richard Blumenthal, Connecticut; Alex Padilla, California; Adam Schiff, California

== Historical subcommittee rosters ==
=== 118th Congress ===
Majority	Minority
Richard Blumenthal, Connecticut, Chair; Amy Klobuchar, Minnesota; Chris Coons, Delaware; Mazie Hirono, Hawaii; Alex Padilla, California; Jon Ossoff, Georgia	Josh Hawley, Missouri, Ranking Member; John Cornyn, Texas; Mike Lee, Utah; John Kennedy, Louisiana; Marsha Blackburn, Tennessee

== Notable activities ==
In May 2022, the subcommittee held a hearing titled "Platform Transparency: Understanding the Impact of Social Media". The hearing centered on issues pertaining to social media platforms, and evaluated proposals that would mandate platforms share information on how their algorithms operate with researchers.
