= Alex Padilla =

American politician (born 1973)

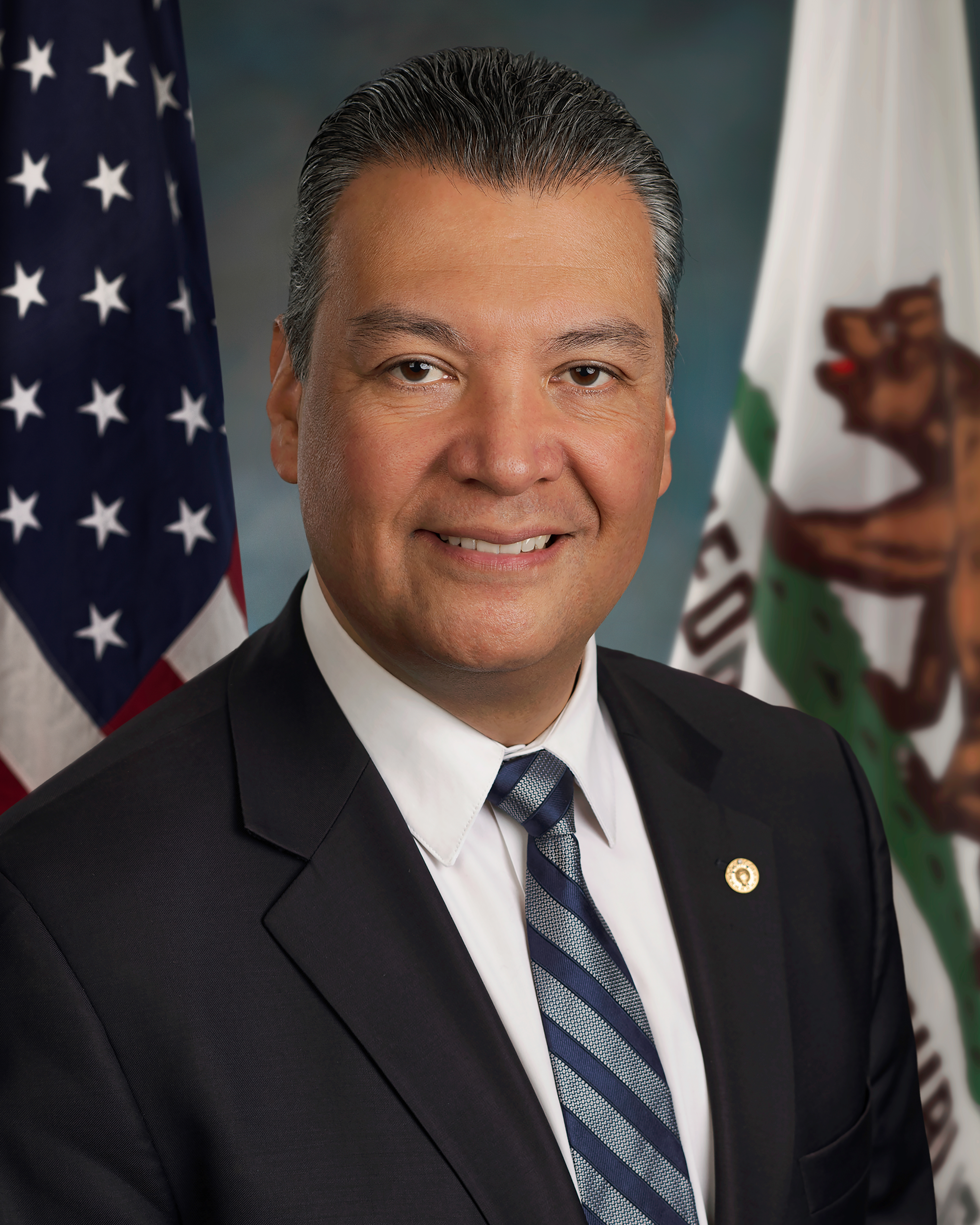
- Official portrait, 2021

Ranking Member of the Senate Rules Committee
- Incumbent
- Assumed office January 3, 2025
- Preceded by: Deb Fischer

United States Senator from California
- Incumbent
- Assumed office January 20, 2021 Serving with Adam Schiff
- Preceded by: Kamala Harris

29th Secretary of State of California
- In office January 5, 2015 – January 20, 2021
- Governor: Jerry Brown; Gavin Newsom
- Preceded by: Debra Bowen
- Succeeded by: Shirley Weber

Member of the California State Senate from the 20th district
- In office December 4, 2006 – November 30, 2014
- Preceded by: Richard Alarcon
- Succeeded by: Connie Leyva

President of the Los Angeles City Council
- In office July 4, 2001 – January 1, 2006
- Preceded by: John Ferraro
- Succeeded by: Eric Garcetti

Member of the Los Angeles City Council from the 7th district
- In office July 1, 1999 – December 4, 2006
- Preceded by: Richard Alarcon
- Succeeded by: Richard Alarcon

Personal details
- Born: March 22, 1973 (age 53) Los Angeles, California, U.S.
- Party: Democratic
- Spouse: Angela Monzon (m. 2012)
- Children: 3
- Education: Massachusetts Institute of Technology (BS)
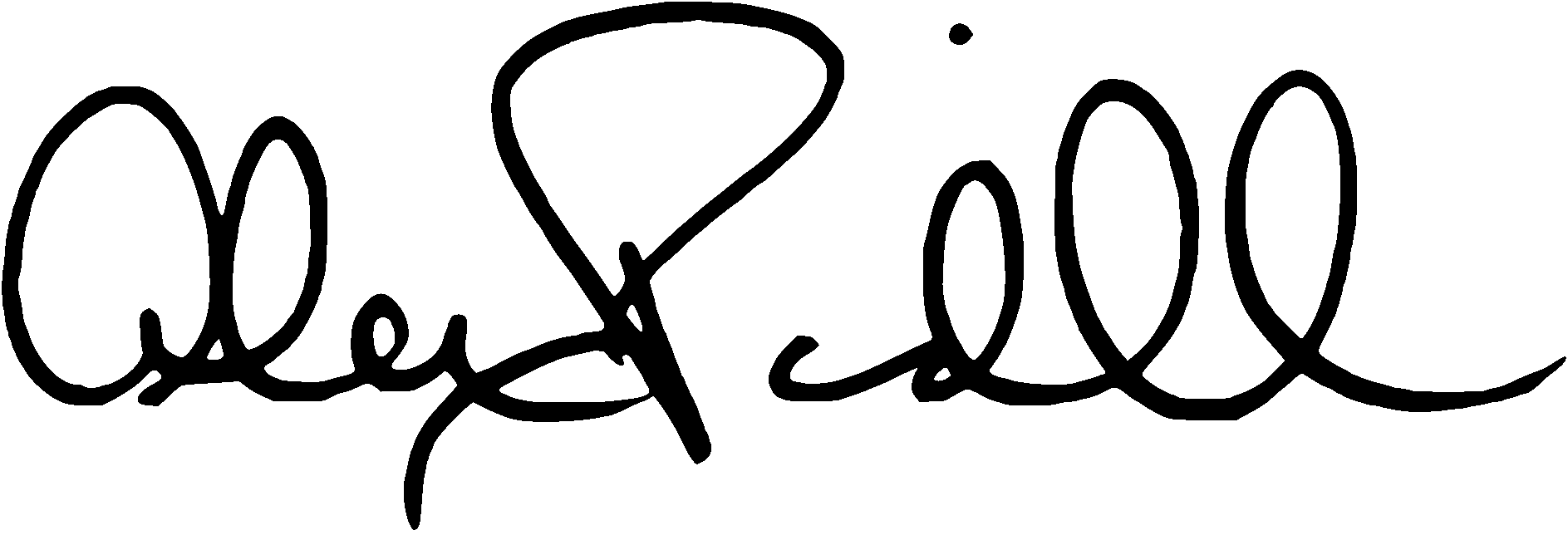
- Signature
- Website: Senate website Campaign website
- Padilla's voice Padilla questioning witnesses on the Equal Rights Amendment; Recorded February 28, 2023

Alejandro Padilla (born March 22, 1973) is an American politician and engineer serving as the senior United States senator from California, a seat he has held since 2021. A member of the Democratic Party, Padilla served as the 29th secretary of state of California from 2015 to 2021 and was a member of the California State Senate and the Los Angeles City Council.

Governor Gavin Newsom appointed Padilla to the United States Senate in 2021 after Kamala Harris was elected vice president of the United States; Harris, as the newly elected vice president and president of the Senate, swore Padilla in on January 18, 2021. In 2022, Padilla won a special election to complete Harris's term and election to a full Senate term.

Padilla became California's senior senator on September 29, 2023, upon the death of Dianne Feinstein.

== Early life and education ==
Padilla was born in Los Angeles on March 22, 1973, and is one of three children of Santos Padilla, who emigrated from Jalisco, and Guadalupe "Lupe" Padilla (née Gonzalez), who emigrated from Chihuahua. His parents met and married in Los Angeles. His parents were initially undocumented immigrants to the US, but after his birth became citizens. His father worked as a short-order cook, and his mother as a housekeeper. He grew up in Pacoima, Los Angeles, and graduated from San Fernando High School in the northeast San Fernando Valley. He earned a degree in mechanical engineering from Massachusetts Institute of Technology (MIT) in 1994. He graduated from the Coro Fellows Southern California Program in 1995.

== Early career ==
=== Los Angeles ===
After graduation, Padilla moved back to Pacoima and briefly worked as an engineer for Hughes Aircraft, where he wrote software for satellite systems.

Padilla is a former member of the governing board of MIT and president of the National Association of Latino Elected and Appointed Officials (NALEO), which has a membership of more than 6,000 Latino U.S. officials. He has chaired the Los Angeles Leadership Council for the American Diabetes Association since 2005.

Padilla began in politics as a member of the Democratic Party in 1995, in part due to his response to California Proposition 187 (1994), which excluded illegal immigrants from all non-emergency public services, including public education. The proposition was criticized as a nativist backlash against Latin American immigrants, legal and illegal alike. Padilla's first professional role was as a personal assistant to Senator Dianne Feinstein. He then served as a campaign manager for Assemblyman Tony Cárdenas in 1996, Assemblyman Gil Cedillo in 1997, and State Senator Richard Alarcon in 1998, all Democrats. All won their elections.

=== Los Angeles City Council ===
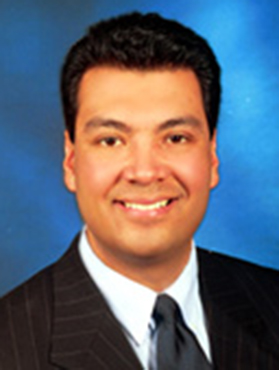
Padilla as a city councilmember in 2000

On July 1, 1999, at age 26, Padilla was sworn in as a member of the Los Angeles City Council, succeeding Alarcon. Two years later, his colleagues elected him council president. Padilla was the first Latino and the youngest person elected president of the Los Angeles City Council, defeating incumbent Ruth Galanter. On September 13, 2001, two days after the 9/11 attacks, Padilla became the acting mayor of Los Angeles for a couple of days while Mayor James K. Hahn traveled out of the city. Los Angeles Times wrote that Padilla's rise to the mayor's office raised his "political stock".

During his term as City Council president, Padilla also was elected president of the California League of Cities, the first Latino to serve in that position.

=== California State Senate ===
After retiring as president of the Los Angeles City Council, Padilla was elected to the State Senate in 2006, defeating Libertarian Pamela Brown and again succeeding Alarcon. He was reelected in 2010 with nearly 70% of the vote over Republican Kathleen Evans. Padilla served as a member of the Appropriations Committee, Business and Professions and Economic Development Committee, Governmental Organization Committee, Labor and Industrial Relations Committee, and chaired the Select Committee on Science, Innovation and Public Policy. He left office on November 30, 2014, after two terms.

In August 2012, Padilla was included in a list of 20 Latino political rising stars compiled by the San Francisco Chronicle, citing his role in the National Association of Latino Elected and Appointed Officials.

In September 2014, Padilla promoted what would later become Proposition 67, a proposed ban on plastic bags. On November 8, 2016, when Padilla was Secretary of State, the proposal was voted on in a referendum, and the option in favor of the ban on plastic bags received 53% of the vote. Padilla authored legislation that passed in 2008 requiring some restaurants to disclose calorie information on menus.

== 30th Secretary of State of California (2015–2021) ==
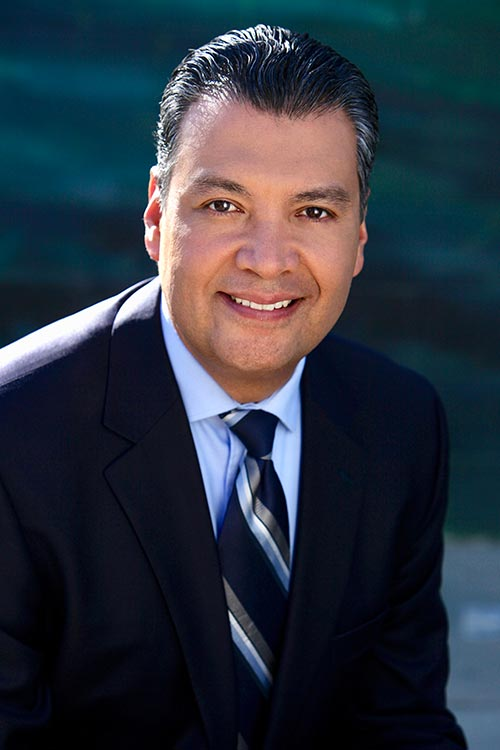
Official Secretary of State photo

On April 11, 2013, Padilla announced his intention to run for California secretary of state in 2014, to succeed the term-limited incumbent Debra Bowen. He was expected to face an intraparty battle with fellow Democrat Leland Yee, but Yee's arrest for felony racketeering caused Yee to abandon the race. Padilla won the election on November 4, 2014, with 53.6% of the vote, defeating Republican Pete Peterson. He was officially sworn into office specifically on January 5, 2015, concurrently during Jerry Brown's fourth term.

On June 29, 2017, the Presidential Advisory Commission on Election Integrity, which President Donald Trump created on May 11, requested data on enrolled voters from every state, dating back to 2006. Padilla said that California would not supply the data.

On November 6, 2018, Padilla was reelected with 64.5% of the vote, defeating Republican Mark P. Meuser.

On October 16, 2020, Padilla was involved in a controversy between the state and the California Republican Party, as the party deployed unofficial ballot boxes for voters to submit their ballots at select locations, including churches and gun stores in competitive California districts. Padilla issued a cease-and-desist order, arguing that the ballot boxes were illegal and failed to ensure ballot security. Local Republican leadership refused to follow the order and said the boxes were a form of legal ballot harvesting that had been enabled by recent Democratic legislation (which lacked a chain of custody requirement), and were a way to increase voter turnout. Accusing Democrats of hypocrisy given their widespread door-to-door ballot harvesting in the 2018 United States elections, the state Republican Party later agreed to a set of collection procedures and said a volunteer's mistake of affixing a sign denoting the ballot box as "official" had contributed to the political standoff; Padilla's office said it was continuing to investigate whether ballots were being handled correctly and that the "ineptitude or unlawfulness of a political operative or campaign volunteer" could nonetheless lead to "serious legal consequences".

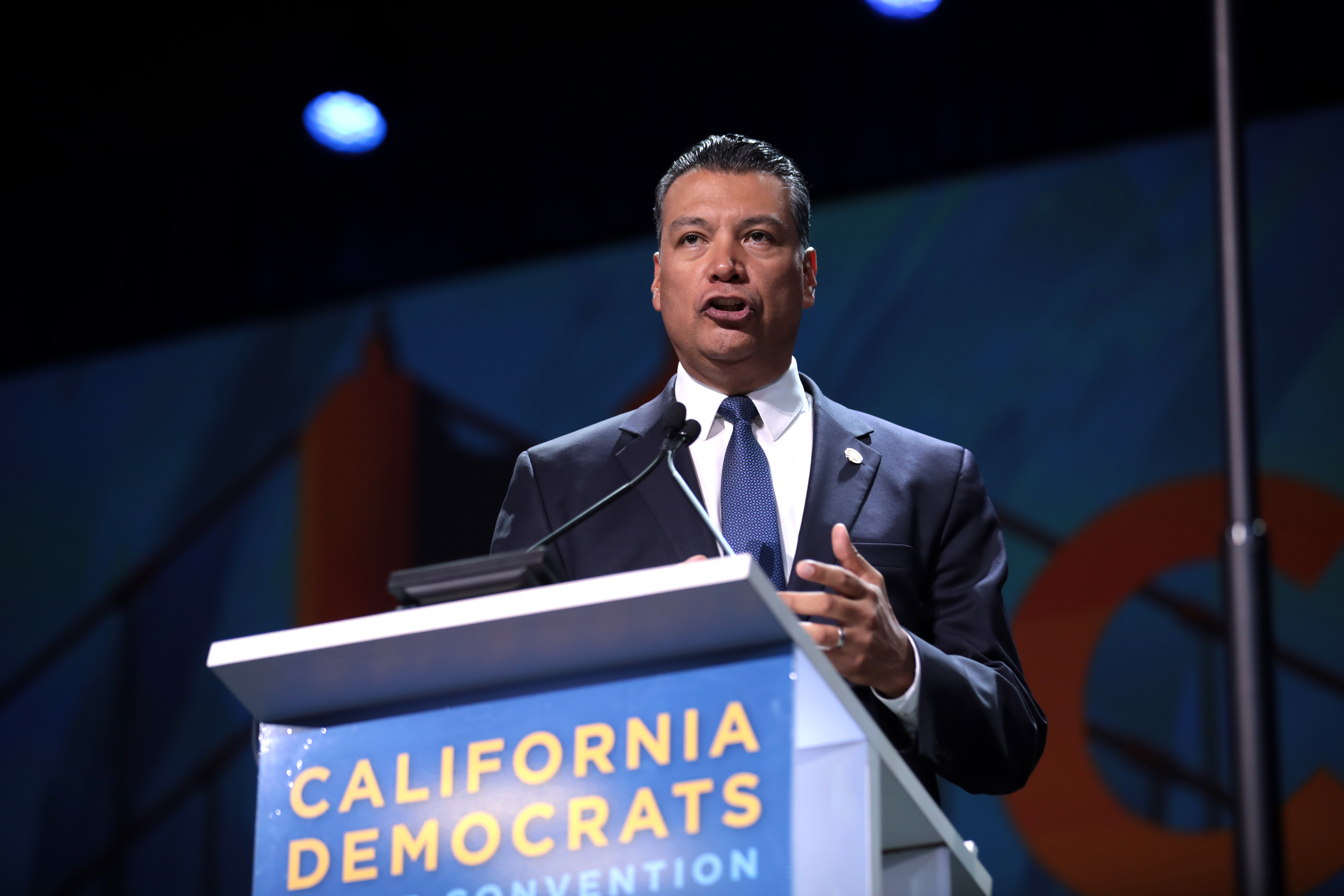
Padilla speaking with attendees at the 2019 California Democratic Party State Convention

In early 2020, Padilla announced a $35 million no-bid contract for a statewide voter education ad campaign with partisan public relations firm SKDK (then known as "SKDKnickerbocker") called "Vote Safe California", but State Controller Betty Yee blocked the funding because Padilla's office did not have the authority to use federal money that was allocated to county governments; the campaign proceeded anyway. The group had marketed itself as being on "Team Biden", and the awarding of the no-bid contract under supposed "emergency powers" despite the group's ties with the Democratic Party and work for Democratic politicians running for office in California received bipartisan criticism. Amid ongoing litigation by the Howard Jarvis Taxpayers Association, who contend that the contract bypassed fair competition rules and misappropriated federal election funding for local elections operations, and was therefore illegal, Governor Newsom signed legislation that provided state funding to reimburse SKDK in February 2021.

Upon Padilla's appointment to the U.S. Senate, Newsom appointed Assemblywoman Shirley Weber to succeed him.

== U.S. Senate (2021–present) ==
=== Appointment ===
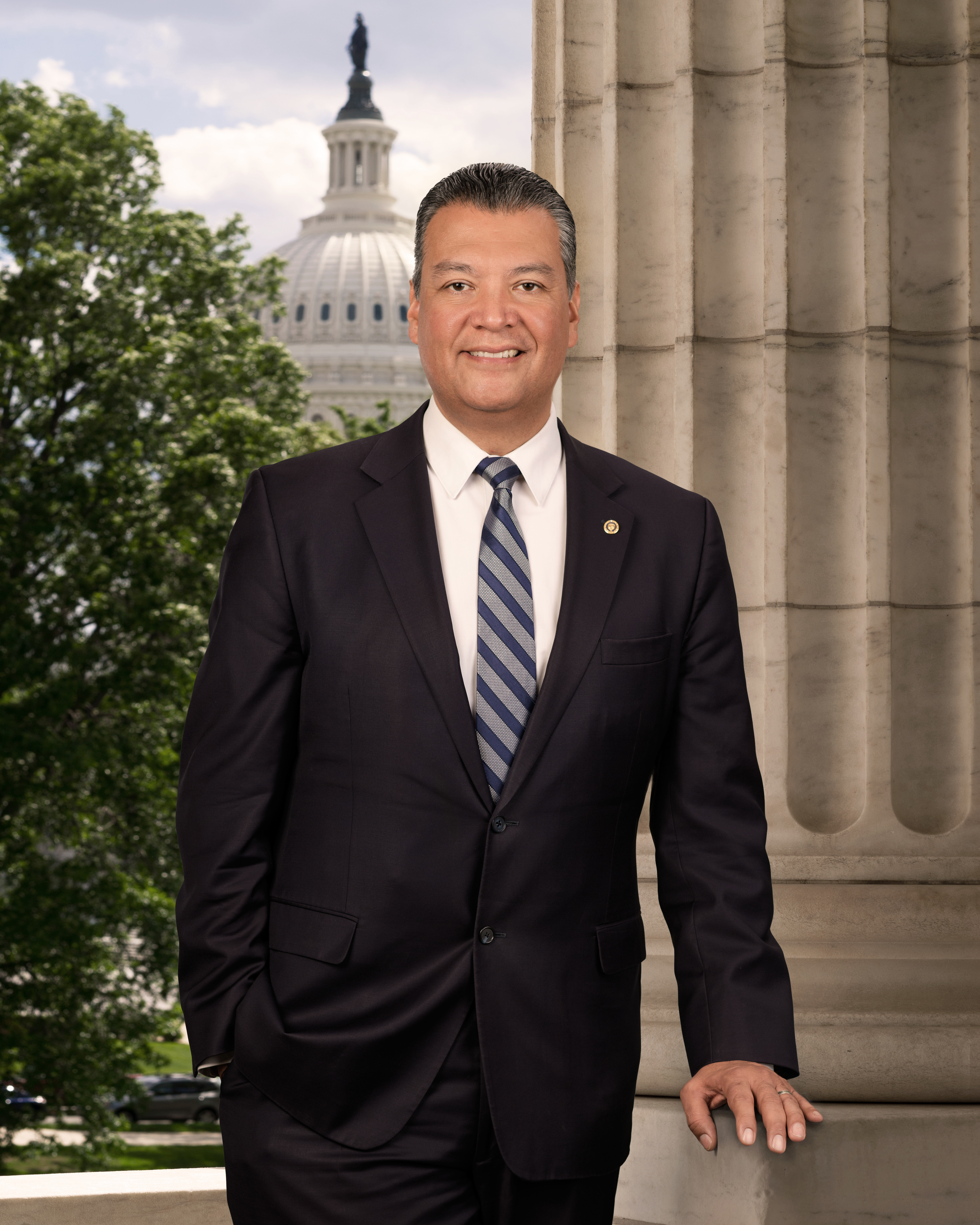
Padilla during the 117th Congress

In August 2020, Democratic presidential nominee Joe Biden selected California Senator Kamala Harris as his running mate. After they won the general election, Padilla was mentioned as a possible choice as Harris's successor in the Senate. Governor Newsom had the power to appoint her successor. In December 2020, Newsom announced that he would appoint Padilla to the seat, making him California's first Hispanic senator and the first male U.S. senator from California since Alan Cranston retired in 1993. During the speculation about whom Newsom would appoint, the senior senator from California, Dianne Feinstein, supported Padilla. To replace Padilla as California's secretary of state, Newsom appointed state assemblywoman Shirley Weber. Padilla was sworn in on January 20, 2021, by Harris along with newly elected Senators Jon Ossoff and Raphael Warnock of Georgia. He was escorted by Senator Dianne Feinstein.

Most Latinos, who are 40% of California's population, supported Padilla's appointment, but some black leaders, who wanted another black woman to replace Harris, criticized it. San Francisco Mayor London Breed called Padilla's appointment "a real blow to the African American community".

=== 2022 Senate campaign ===
Padilla announced that he would seek a full term in 2022. He appeared on two ballots: one for the special election to fill the remainder of his term in the 117th Congress, and the other for the new term beginning with the 118th Congress. The special election was due to a recent change in California law that ended Padilla's appointment in November 2022. He was on the ballot in two separate races in the November 2022 election—a special election for the final two months of Harris's Senate term, and a regular election for a full six-year term beginning in January 2023.

=== Tenure ===
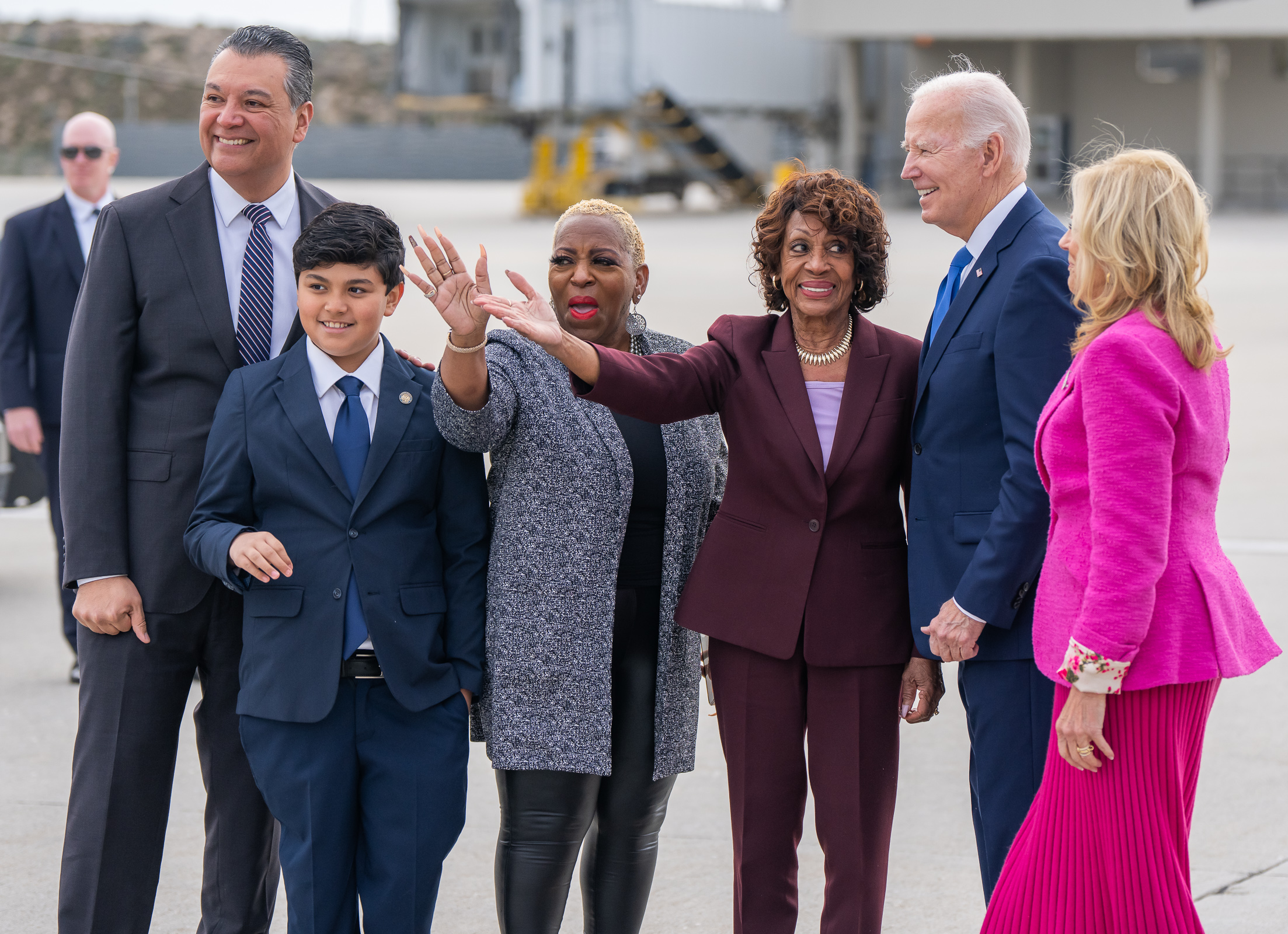
Padilla with Maxine Waters, Joe Biden & Jill Biden in February 2024

On January 20, 2021, Padilla was sworn into the United States Senate in the 117th Congress by Vice President Kamala Harris, his predecessor, becoming the first Latino to represent California in the U.S. Senate. He was sworn in by Vice President Harris on her first day, at the same time as new Georgia senators Jon Ossoff and Raphael Warnock. He served the final two years of Harris's term. He filed the necessary paperwork with the FEC to run for a full term and an unexpired term in the 2022 elections which he won in November 2022.

While in office, Padilla introduced legislation to add more legal protections for various public lands in California, including parts of the San Gabriel Mountains, Los Padres National Forest, and Carrizo Plain National Monument. Padilla also introduced legislation to help coastal communities adapt shorelines to increased flooding and erosion from sea level rise and extreme weather.

As of the end of 2023, Padilla had voted with Biden 100% of the time.

==== June 2025 incident ====
On June 12, 2025, Padilla was forcibly removed from a press conference held in the Wilshire Federal Building by Department of Homeland Security (DHS) Secretary Kristi Noem, addressing the Los Angeles protests in response to ICE operations. Padilla was in the building for a scheduled 10:30 briefing by representatives of Northern Command, including General Gregory Guillot, about the administration's plan to use the Guantanamo Bay detention camp to hold undocumented migrants. When informed that the briefing was delayed due to the press conference in a nearby room, he asked to attend, was escorted in, and stood behind the press reporters and cameras.

Noem repeatedly blamed California state governor Gavin Newsom and L.A. Mayor Karen Bass, then, about six minutes into her statement, said the Republican administration was going to "liberate the city from the socialist and burdensome leadership that this mayor and this governor have placed on this country". At that point, Padilla interrupted the press conference by walking toward the podium while saying "Madame Secretary, I want to know why you insist on exaggerating and embellishing", but he was blocked by security and forcibly removed by Secret Service agents. While he was being pushed to the back of the room, he said, "I am Senator Alex Padilla. I have questions for the secretary" and told security "Hands off, hands off!" Security pushed him out of the room and into a hallway, where several agents held him face-down on the floor and he was handcuffed by FBI Police. Padilla was briefly detained, and said he was released only after Corey Lewandowski, an adviser to Noem, ran over, yelling "Let him go! Let him go!"

Noem said she had a "great" conversation with Padilla after the incident, but that his approach was "something that I don't think was appropriate at all". Padilla said she gave "the same old company line that they're targeting the dangerous criminals". Later, Noem and White House press secretary Karoline Leavitt alleged that Padilla had lunged at Noem. A post from the official DHS account on X said that Padilla "chose disrespectful political theatre and interrupted a live press conference without identifying himself or having his Senate security pin on as he lunged toward Secretary Noem." The post also claimed that Padilla was repeatedly told to back away by officers but did not comply.

When he left the building, Padilla told reporters that his question was about ICE detaining immigrants without criminal records. He later added that he and his Judiciary Subcommittee colleagues had repeatedly asked Homeland Security about its "increasingly extreme immigration enforcement actions" without getting a response. A number of Democratic senators condemned Padilla's treatment; Republican senators Lisa Murkowski and Susan Collins also voiced concern. Jamie Raskin, the ranking Democrat on the House Judiciary Committee, wrote FBI director Kash Patel, asking for the incident to be investigated and to get a briefing.

In 2026, Senate minority leader Chuck Schumer shared a photo of the incident, alongside senator Andy Kim, who had been pepper sprayed by ICE during the 2026 Delaney Hall hunger strike and protests, writing, "When even U.S. Senators are targeted, every American should understand: no one is safe from ICE's abuses." This post was criticized by Department of Homeland Security (DHS) secretary Markwayne Mullin.

==== Response to the 2026 State of the Union address ====
Padilla gave the Democratic Spanish-language response to Trump's 2026 State of the Union address.

=== Committee assignments ===
==== Current ====
- Committee on the Judiciary
  - Subcommittee on Criminal Justice and Counterterrorism
  - Subcommittee on Federal Courts, Oversight, Agency Action and Federal Rights
  - Subcommittee on Immigration, Citizenship, and Border Safety (Ranking Member)
  - Subcommittee on Intellectual Property
  - Subcommittee on Privacy, Technology and the Law
- Committee on the Budget
- Committee on Environment and Public Works
  - Subcommittee on Clean Air, Climate and Nuclear Safety
  - Subcommittee on Fisheries, Water, and Wildlife (Chair)
  - Subcommittee on Transportation and Infrastructure
- Committee on Energy and Natural Resources (since October 2023)
- Committee on Rules and Administration

==== Previous ====
- Committee on Homeland Security and Governmental Affairs (until October 2023)

=== Caucus memberships ===
- Congressional Hispanic Caucus
- Senate Cultural Caucus
- Congressional Asian Pacific American Caucus
- Rare Disease Caucus

=== Appointments ===
- National Security Commission on Emerging Biotechnology, Commissioner

== Political positions ==
The Wall Street Journal says that Padilla had "a reputation [in the State Senate] as a business-friendly moderate". FiveThirtyEight defined him as a technocrat, not identified with either the progressive or the moderate wing of the party. The American Conservative Union gave Padilla a 0% rating in 2012. On January 18, 2021, Padilla released a statement in support of the Green New Deal and Medicare For All legislation, among other progressive policies.

=== Abortion ===
Padilla favors abortion rights, saying in 2018 that abortion rights are "not negotiable". In 2008, Padilla sponsored the bill SB 1770, which would require the Commission on Peace Officer Standards Training (POST) to prepare relevant guidelines and mechanisms for the investigation and reporting of "cases involving anti-reproductive-rights crimes". In 2018, after winning the primary for secretary of state to seek a second term, he received support from NARAL Pro-Choice America.

When Roe v. Wade was overturned in June 2022, Padilla condemned the decision.

=== Climate and environment ===
Padilla supports climate action and said during budgetary discussions in October 2021 that "[c]limate cannot be on the chopping block in this or any budget." He supports the Green New Deal and has said that it "offers a once-in-a-generation opportunity." Padilla received a 100% score from the League of Conservation Voters in 2021.

In April 2025, Padilla introduced the Fix Our Forests Act alongside Senators John Hickenlooper, John Curtis, and Tim Sheehy. The bill aims to improve forest management for wildfire risk reduction.

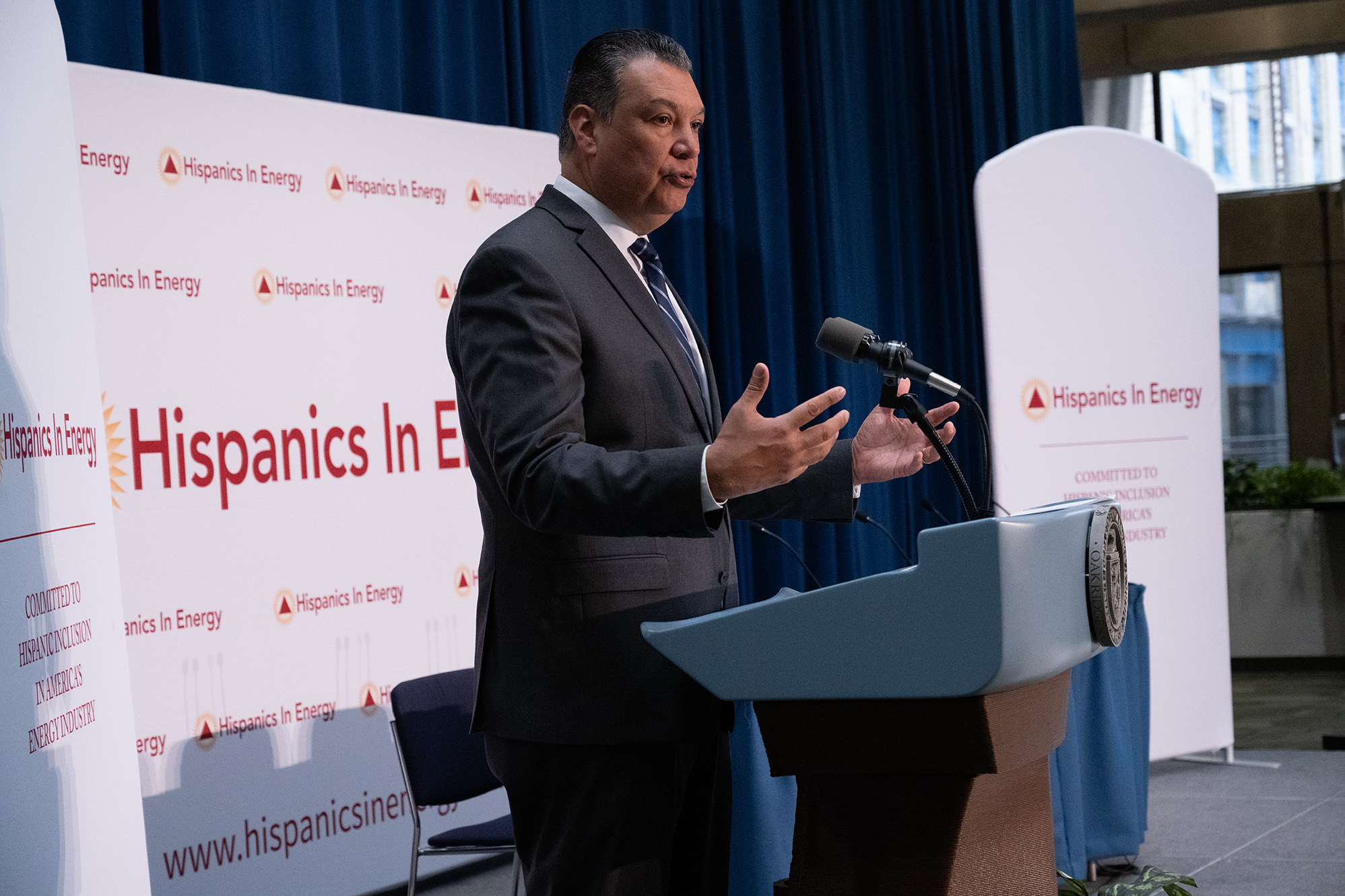
Padilla speaking at the Department of Energy's Hispanics in Energy Summit in February, 2024

=== Filibuster ===
Padilla supports ending the Senate filibuster.

=== Immigration ===
Padilla supports immigrants' rights. On January 15, 2021, he said that he supports legislation sponsored by representative Joaquin Castro to speed up the citizenship process for undocumented immigrants in essential jobs, declaring that because of the work they do, "they deserve stability".

In January 2026, Padilla emerged as a leading Senate voice against the Department of Homeland Security funding bill. After federal immigration agents fatally shot Renée Good and Alex Pretti during Operation Metro Surge in Minneapolis, Padilla and Senator Chris Murphy spent several days calling colleagues to organize opposition to the bill. On January 20, Padilla and Senator Adam Schiff conducted an oversight visit to the California City Detention Facility, the state's largest immigration detention center, where they documented concerns about conditions including inadequate medical care and nutrition. On January 26, Padilla and Senator Cory Booker introduced the Dignity for Detained Immigrants Act, which would end the use of private, for-profit detention facilities, prohibit family detention, and increase federal oversight of the immigration detention system.

=== Voting rights ===
Padilla has been known for efforts to expand voting access. When he was appointed to the Senate in 2021, Newsom called him "a national defender of voting rights". As California Secretary of State in 2020, he sent a cease-and-desist order to the California Republican Party to remove unofficial ballot drop boxes in at least three counties. Republican officials later admitted they had placed more than 50 misleading ballot boxes in Los Angeles, Orange, and Fresno Counties.

=== Puerto Rico political status ===
In November 2023, Padilla introduced legislation in the Senate to authorize a binding federally sponsored referendum, known as a plebiscite, to resolve Puerto Rico's political status. The legislation details the transition and implementation of non-territorial status for Puerto Rico: statehood, independence, or sovereignty in free association with the U.S.

=== Foreign Intelligence Surveillance Act ===
In April 2024, Padilla voted in favor of the Reforming Intelligence and Securing America Act to reauthorize the Foreign Intelligence Surveillance Act (FISA) for five years including changes to certain restrictions on surveillance under Section 702.

== Personal life ==
Padilla married Angela Monzon in 2012. They have three sons and live in the San Fernando Valley's Porter Ranch neighborhood.

== Electoral history ==
Year	Office	Party	Primary			General				Result	Swing	Ref.
Year	Office	Party	Total	%	P.	Total	%	±%	P.	Result	Swing	Ref.
1999	Los Angeles City Council	Non-partisan	6,932	47.9%	1st	9,188	66.8%	N/A	1st	Won	N/A	
2001	Los Angeles City Council	Non-partisan	18,593	100.0%	1st	N/A (Note: General election cancelled for a non-partisan office when candidate receives more than 50% of the vote in the primary)				Won	N/A	
2005	Los Angeles City Council	Non-partisan	13,482	100.0%	1st	N/A				Won	N/A	
2006	State Senator	Democratic	24,303	55.8%	1st	84,459	74.85%	–25.15%	1st	Won	Hold	
2010	State Senator	Democratic	26,431	100.0%	1st	94,356	68.34%	–6.51%	1st	Won	Hold	
2014	Secretary of State	Democratic	1,217,371	30.24%	1st	3,799,711	53.63%	+0.45%	1st	Won	Hold	
2018	Secretary of State	Democratic	3,475,643	52.56%	1st	7,909,521	64.45%	+10.82%	1st	Won	Hold	
2022	U.S. Senator (short term)	Democratic	3,740,582	54.98%	1st	6,559,303	60.89%	N/A (Note: The most recent election for this seat was between two Democrats, so there can be no percent change.)	1st	Won	Hold	
2022	U.S. Senator (full term)	Democratic	3,725,544	54.12%	1st	6,621,616	61.06%	N/A	1st	Won	Hold	

== See also ==
- List of Hispanic and Latino Americans in the United States Congress

== Notes ==
Political offices
Preceded by Ruth Galanter	President of the Los Angeles City Council; 2001–2006	Succeeded by Eric Garcetti
Preceded by Debra Bowen	Secretary of State of California; 2015–2021	Succeeded by James Schwab; Acting
U.S. Senate
Preceded by Kamala Harris	U.S. Senator (Class 3) from California; 2021–present Served alongside: Dianne Feinstein, Laphonza Butler, Adam Schiff	Incumbent
Preceded by Deb Fischer	Ranking Member of the Senate Rules Committee; 2025–present	Incumbent
Party political offices
Preceded by Kamala Harris	Democratic nominee for U.S. Senator from California (Class 3); 2022	Most recent
U.S. order of precedence (ceremonial)
Preceded by Raphael Warnock	Order of precedence of the United States as United States Senator	Succeeded by John Fetterman
Preceded by Tommy Tuberville	United States senators by seniority 76th	Succeeded by Jon Ossoff
