= US Senate career of Barack Obama =

Barack Obama
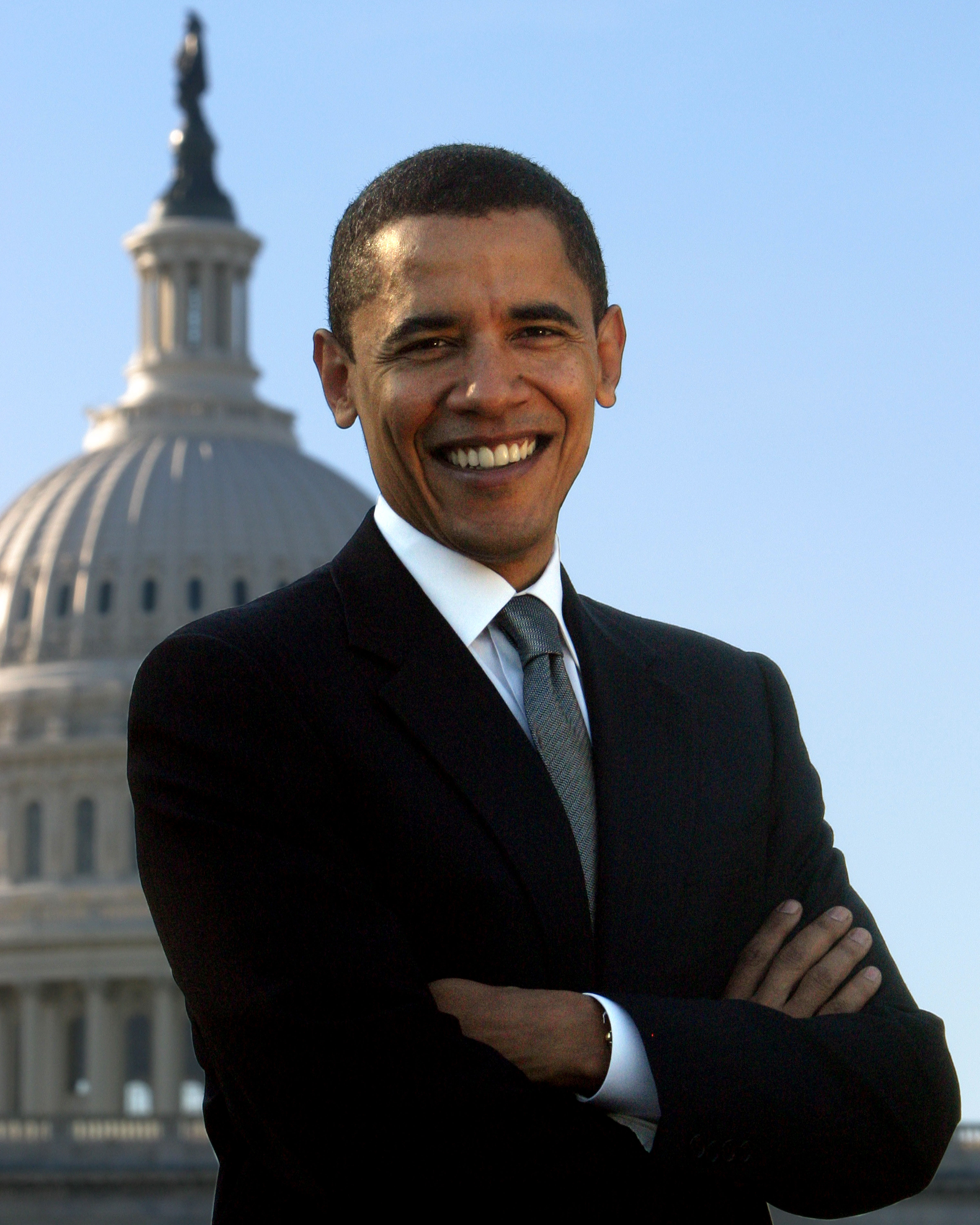
- Obama in 2005, during the 109th United States Congress

United States Senator from Illinois
- In office January 3, 2005 – November 16, 2008
- Preceded by: Peter Fitzgerald
- Succeeded by: Roland Burris

Chairman of the Senate Foreign Relations Subcommittee on European Affairs
- In office January 3, 2007 – November 16, 2008
- Preceded by: George Allen
- Succeeded by: Jeanne Shaheen

Barack Obama served as a U.S. senator representing Illinois from January 3, 2005, to November 16, 2008. A member of the Democratic Party, Obama had previously served three terms in the Illinois Senate from 1997 to 2005. He resigned his seat in the U.S. Senate upon being elected president of the United States.

Obama won the seat in an election against Alan Keyes who replaced Republican primary election winner Jack Ryan. Obama rose to national prominence by delivering the 2004 Democratic National Convention keynote address. Upon his election, he became the fifth African-American senator in U.S. history, as well as the third to have been popularly elected.

As a senator, Obama served on a variety of committees and chaired the United States Senate Foreign Relations Subcommittee on European Affairs. His bill sponsorship and voting records indicates that he was a Democratic Party loyalist. He was considered to be among the most liberal by various analyses. In his first session (109th Congress), he was involved in immigration reform. Legislation bearing his name was passed for armament reduction and federal transparency as well as relief aid.

In the first year of the 110th Congress, he worked on lobbying and campaign finance reform, election reform, climate control and troop reduction. In the second year, he legislated for oversight of certain military discharges, Iran divestment and nuclear terrorism reduction, but President George W. Bush vetoed his legislation for State Children's Health Insurance Program-related military family job protections. Obama resigned his seat after winning the 2008 presidential election.

== 2004 U.S. Senate campaign in Illinois ==
Final results of the 2004 U.S. Senate election in Illinois by county: Obama: 40-50%; 50–60%; 60–70%; 70–80%; 80–90%; Keyes: 50–60%; 60–70%

In May 2002, Obama began considering a run for the U.S. Senate, enlisting political strategist David Axelrod that Fall and formally announcing his candidacy in January 2003. Before deciding to run, Obama met with Jesse Jackson Jr., who was known to be considering a bid for the seat. "He said, 'Jesse, if you’re running for the U.S. Senate I’m not going to run'", Jackson said in recounting the conversation to The New York Times in 2008. Jackson told Obama he had already decided not to run.

Decisions by Republican incumbent Peter Fitzgerald and his Democratic predecessor Carol Moseley Braun not to contest the race launched wide-open Democratic and Republican primary contests involving fifteen candidates. Obama's candidacy was boosted by Axelrod's advertising campaign featuring images of the late Chicago Mayor Harold Washington and an endorsement by the daughter of the late Paul Simon, former U.S. Senator for Illinois. He received over 52% of the vote in the March 2004 primary, emerging 29% ahead of his nearest Democratic rival.

Obama's expected opponent in the general election, Republican primary winner Jack Ryan, withdrew from the race in June 2004. In August 2004, with less than three months to go before Election Day, Alan Keyes accepted the Illinois Republican Party's nomination to replace Ryan. A long time resident of Maryland, Keyes established legal residency in Illinois with the nomination.

Through three televised debates, Obama and Keyes expressed opposing views on stem cell research, abortion, gun control, school vouchers, and tax cuts. Obama was criticized by Keyes, as he had also been by rival pro-choice candidates in the Democratic primary, for a series of "present" votes on late-term abortion and parental notification issues. The charge that Obama's "present" votes suggested he was not firmly pro choice was refuted by two lobbyists for pro-choice groups (including Planned Parenthood).

In the general election of November 2004, Obama received 70% of the vote to Keyes's 27%, the largest victory margin for a statewide race in Illinois history. He won 92 of the state's 102 counties, including several where Democrats have not historically done well.

=== Keynote address ===
In July 2004, he wrote and delivered the keynote address at the 2004 Democratic National Convention in Boston, Massachusetts. After describing his maternal grandfather's experiences as a World War II veteran and a beneficiary of the New Deal's FHA and G.I. Bill programs, Obama spoke about changing the U.S. government's economic and social priorities.

He questioned the Bush administration's management of the Iraq War, and highlighted America's obligations to its soldiers. Drawing examples from U.S. history, he criticized heavily partisan views of the electorate and asked Americans to find unity in diversity, saying, "There is not a liberal America and a conservative America; there's the United States of America." Broadcasts of the speech by major news organizations launched Obama's status as a national political figure and boosted his campaign for U.S. Senate.

With Obama facing nearly certain victory in his U.S. Senate race against Alan Keyes at the time combined with an overwhelmingly positive reaction to his address, speculation grew about the possibility of a potential Obama candidacy for President of the United States in 2008 or later. Following the speech, Chris Mathews even went as far as predicting that Obama would become the first African-American president.

If he decided to run for President, he would join other African-Americans like Alan Keyes and Shirley Chisholm who had previous presidential runs. But as of 2004, no African-American had received a major party's presidential nomination and no African-American had won a presidential primary since Jesse Jackson in 1988.

In addition, Hillary Clinton was favored by many to become the Democratic nominee and first ever female presidential nominee in 2008 while in contrast to Clinton, Obama's background and issue positions were still unknown to the majority of the public. For the next two years, Obama would downplay speculation of a future presidential run and focus instead on his duties as a U.S. Senator.

== Initial work ==
Although a newcomer to Washington, he recruited a team of established, high-level advisers devoted to broad themes that exceeded the usual requirements of an incoming first-term senator. Obama hired Pete Rouse, a 30-year veteran of national politics and former chief of staff to Senate Democratic Leader Tom Daschle, as his chief of staff, and economist Karen Kornbluh, former deputy chief of staff to Secretary of the Treasury Robert Rubin, as his policy director.

His key foreign policy advisers have included former Clinton administration officials Anthony Lake and Susan Rice, as well as Samantha Power, author on human rights and genocide (who resigned March 7, 2008). Obama held assignments on the Senate Committees for Foreign Relations; Health, Education, Labor and Pensions; Homeland Security and Governmental Affairs; and Veterans' Affairs, and he was a member of the Congressional Black Caucus.

He was a chairman of the Subcommittee on European Affairs. Nonpartisan analyses of bill sponsorship and voting records placed him as a "rank-and-file Democrat" and "Democratic Party loyalist." The U.S. Senate Historical Office lists him as the fifth African-American Senator in U.S. history, the third to have been popularly elected, and the only African-American serving in the Senate until he resigned his seat in November 2008 in preparation for his new job as the 44th President of the United States.

=== Committees ===
- Committee on Health, Education, Labor, and Pensions (110th Congress)
  - Subcommittee on Children and Families
  - Subcommittee on Employment and Workplace Safety
- Committee on Homeland Security and Governmental Affairs (110th Congress)
  - Subcommittee on Investigations
  - Subcommittee on Federal Financial Management, Government Information and International Security
  - Ad Hoc Subcommittee on State, Local, and Private Sector Preparedness and Integration
- United States Senate Committee on Veterans' Affairs
- Committee on Environment and Public Works (109th Congress)
  - Subcommittee on Clean Air and Nuclear Safety
- Committee on Foreign Relations
  - Subcommittee on European Affairs (Chairman – 110th Congress)
  - Subcommittee on Near Eastern and South and Central Asian Affairs
  - Subcommittee on East Asian and Pacific Affairs
  - Subcommittee on African Affairs
  - Subcommittee on International Development and Foreign Assistance, Economic Affairs, and International Environmental Protection

Source: United States Senate 109th Congress Source: United States Senate 110th Congress

== 109th Congress ==
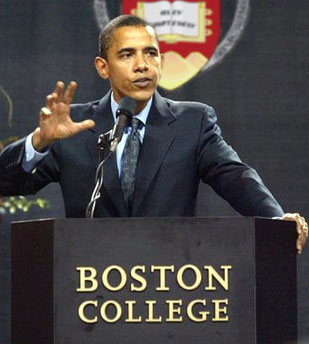
Obama addresses the First Year Student Convocation at Boston College, September 2005.

Obama took an active role in the Senate's drive for improved border security and immigration reform. In May 2005, he cosponsored the Secure America and Orderly Immigration Act introduced by Sen. John McCain (R–AZ).

He later added three amendments to the Comprehensive Immigration Reform Act, which passed the Senate in May 2006, but failed to gain majority support in the U.S. House of Representatives.

In September 2006, Obama voted for a related bill, the Secure Fence Act, authorizing construction of fencing and other security improvements along the United States–Mexico border. President Bush signed the Secure Fence Act into law in October 2006, calling it "an important step toward immigration reform."

Partnering first with Sen. Richard Lugar (R–IN), and then with Sen. Tom Coburn (R–OK), Obama successfully introduced two initiatives bearing his name. Lugar-Obama expands the Nunn-Lugar Cooperative Threat Reduction concept to conventional weapons, including shoulder-fired missiles and anti-personnel mines. The Lugar-Obama initiative subsequently received $48 million in funding.

The Coburn-Obama Transparency Act provides for the web site USAspending.gov, managed by the Office of Management and Budget. The site lists all organizations receiving Federal funds from 2007 onward and provides breakdowns by the agency allocating the funds, the dollar amount given, and the purpose of the grant or contract.

Obama and Coburn also collaborated on repeated efforts to end the abuse of no-bid contracting in the aftermath of natural disasters. In December 2006, President Bush signed into law the Democratic Republic of the Congo Relief, Security, and Democracy Promotion Act, marking the first federal legislation to be enacted with Obama as its primary sponsor.

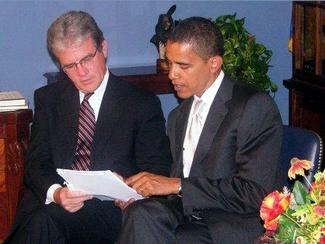
Senate bill sponsors Tom Coburn (R–OK) and Obama discuss the Coburn-Obama Transparency Act.

As a member of the Senate Foreign Relations Committee, Obama made official trips to Eastern Europe, the Middle East, and Africa. In August 2005, he traveled with Richard Lugar to Russia, Ukraine, and Azerbaijan. The trip focused on strategies to control the world's supply of conventional weapons, biological weapons, and weapons of mass destruction as a first defense against potential terrorist attacks.

Following meetings with U.S. military in Kuwait and Iraq in January 2006, Obama visited Jordan, Israel, and the Palestinian territories. At a meeting with Palestinian students two weeks before Hamas won the legislative election, Obama warned that "the U.S. will never recognize winning Hamas candidates unless the group renounces its fundamental mission to eliminate Israel."

He left for his third official trip in August 2006, traveling to South Africa, Kenya, Djibouti, Ethiopia and Chad. In a nationally televised speech at the University of Nairobi, he spoke forcefully on the influence of ethnic rivalries and corruption in Kenya. The speech touched off a public debate among rival leaders, some formally challenging Obama's remarks as unfair and improper, others defending his positions.

On June 2, 2006, Obama delivered the commencement speech at the University of Massachusetts Boston. Among other topics, he discussed his keynote address to the 2004 Democratic National Convention in Boston.

== 110th Congress ==
In the first month of the newly Democratic controlled 110th Congress, Obama worked with Russ Feingold (D–WI) to eliminate gifts of travel on corporate jets by lobbyists to members of Congress and require disclosure of bundled campaign contributions under the Honest Leadership and Open Government Act, which was signed into law in September 2007.

He joined Chuck Schumer (D–NY) in sponsoring S. 453, a bill to criminalize deceptive practices in federal elections, including fraudulent flyers and automated phone calls, as witnessed in the 2006 midterm elections.

Obama's energy initiatives scored pluses and minuses with environmentalists, who welcomed his sponsorship with John McCain (R–AZ) of a climate change bill to reduce greenhouse gas emissions by two-thirds by 2050, but were skeptical of his support for a bill promoting liquefied coal production. Obama also introduced the Iraq War De-Escalation Act of 2007, a bill to cap troop levels in Iraq, begin phased redeployment, and remove all combat brigades from Iraq before April 2008.

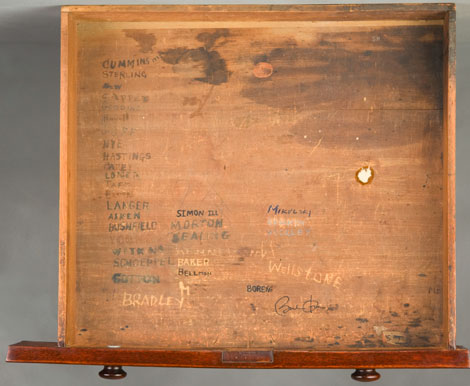
Drawer of chamber desk XXIV that was once occupied in the U.S. Senate by Obama. Note signature inside lower right half of the drawer. This chamber desk was also formerly occupied in the U.S. Senate by Howard Baker, Paul Simon, Robert F. Kennedy, and Henry Cabot Lodge.

Later in 2007, Obama sponsored with Kit Bond (R–MO) an amendment to the 2008 Defense Authorization Act adding safeguards for personality disorder military discharges, and calling for a review by the Government Accountability Office following reports that the procedure had been used inappropriately to reduce government costs.

He sponsored the Iran Sanctions Enabling Act supporting divestment of state pension funds from Iran's oil and gas industry, and joined Chuck Hagel (R–NE) in introducing legislation to reduce risks of nuclear terrorism.

A provision from the Obama-Hagel bill was passed by Congress in December 2007 as an amendment to the State-Foreign Operations appropriations bill. Obama also sponsored a Senate amendment to the State Children's Health Insurance Program (SCHIP) to provide one year of job protection for family members caring for soldiers with combat-related injuries. After passing both houses of Congress with bipartisan majorities, SCHIP was vetoed by President Bush in early October 2007, a move Obama said "shows a callousness of priorities that is offensive to the ideals we hold as Americans".

== Legislation and voting record ==
One analysis of bill co-sponsorship classified Obama as a "rank-and-file Democrat". Another, of party-line votes, tagged him a "Democratic Party loyalist". The National Journal, in its 27th annual vote ratings, identified Obama as "the most liberal senator" in 2007, though this conclusion was rated "Barely True" by PolitiFact.

Asked about the Journal's characterization of his voting record, Obama expressed doubts about the survey's methodology and blamed "old politics" categorization of political positions as conservative or liberal for creating predispositions that prevent problem-solving.

Ratings of Obama's liberalism by the Americans for Democratic Action (ADA), based on 20 ADA-selected votes each year, declined from 100% in 2005 to 95% in 2006, with one vote the ADA counted as not-liberal in 2006, and 75%, with five missed votes, in 2007. A study of the voting records of all one hundred senators, using an average of the ratings of seven liberal interest groups, described Obama as "among the least liberal", of the Democrats, scoring an 80%.

== Resignation and replacement in the U.S. Senate ==
After his election to President of the United States, Obama announced on November 13, 2008 his plan to resign his Senate seat, effective on November 16, 2008. On January 12, 2009, the Senate accepted former Illinois Attorney General Roland Burris as Obama's replacement after he was controversially appointed by Illinois Governor Rod Blagojevich.

== Recognition and honors ==
While in the U.S. Senate, Obama had a number of awards and honors bestowed on him by various groups. An October 2005 article in the British journal New Statesman listed Obama as one of 10 people who could change the world, the only politician included on the list. In 2005 and again in 2007, Time magazine named him one of the world's most influential people.

During his first three years in the U.S. Senate, Obama received Honorary Doctorates of Law from Knox College (2005), University of Massachusetts Boston (2006), Northwestern University (2006), Xavier University of Louisiana (2006), Southern New Hampshire University (2007), Howard University (2007), and Wesleyan University (2008).

The audiobook edition of Dreams from My Father earned Obama the Grammy Award for Best Spoken Word Album in 2006. He won the award a second time in 2008 for the spoken word edition of The Audacity of Hope. A school in Obama's father's hometown, which the senator visited on his 2006 Kenya trip, was renamed the Senator Barack Obama Primary School.

== See also ==
- Illinois Senate career of Barack Obama
- Political positions of Barack Obama
- Barack Obama 2008 presidential campaign
- Barack Obama 2012 presidential campaign

== Notes ==
Political offices
Preceded by Alice J. Palmer	Illinois State Senator from 13th district January 8, 1997 – November 4, 2004	Succeeded by Kwame Raoul
U.S. Senate
Preceded by Peter Fitzgerald	U.S. senator (Class 3) from Illinois; January 4, 2005 – November 16, 2008; Served alongside: Richard Durbin	Succeeded by Roland Burris
Party political offices
Preceded by Carol Moseley Braun	Democratic Party nominee for Senator from Illinois (Class 3); 2004	Succeeded by Alexi Giannoulias
U.S. order of precedence (ceremonial)
Preceded by Mel Martinez	United States order of precedence United States senators by seniority (2007)	Succeeded by Ken Salazar
