= Barbara Boxer =

American politician (born 1940)

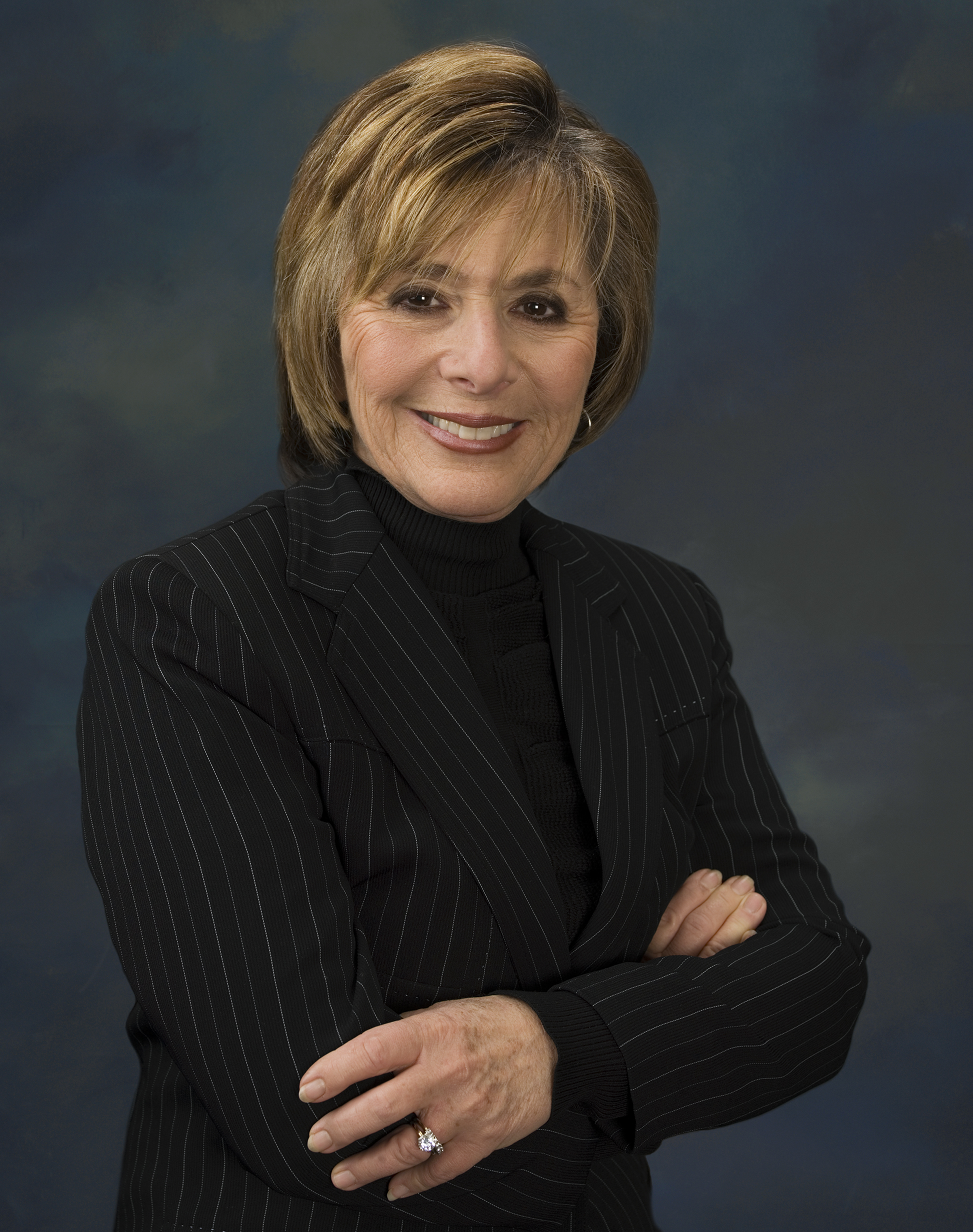
- Official portrait, 2013

United States Senator from California
- In office January 3, 1993 – January 3, 2017
- Preceded by: Alan Cranston
- Succeeded by: Kamala Harris
Senate positions
Ranking Member of the Senate Environment Committee
In office January 3, 2015 – January 3, 2017
Preceded by	David Vitter
Succeeded by	Tom Carper
Chair of the Senate Environment Committee
In office January 3, 2007 – January 3, 2015
Preceded by	Jim Inhofe
Succeeded by	Jim Inhofe
Chair of the Senate Ethics Committee
In office January 3, 2007 – January 3, 2015
Preceded by	George Voinovich
Succeeded by	Johnny Isakson

Member of the U.S. House of Representatives from California's 6th district
- In office January 3, 1983 – January 3, 1993
- Preceded by: John L. Burton
- Succeeded by: Lynn Woolsey

Personal details
- Born: Barbara Sue Levy; November 11, 1940 (age 85) Brooklyn, New York City, U.S.
- Party: Democratic
- Spouse: Stewart Boxer (m. 1962)
- Children: 2
- Education: Brooklyn College (BA)
- Boxer's voice Boxer opening a Senate Environment Committee hearing on the environmental and economic impact of the Deepwater Horizon oil spill. Recorded May 11, 2010

Barbara Sue Boxer (née Levy; born November 11, 1940) is a retired American politician, lobbyist, and former reporter who served in the United States Senate, representing California from 1993 to 2017. A member of the Democratic Party, she served as the U.S. representative for California's 6th congressional district from 1983 until 1993.

Born in Brooklyn, New York City, Boxer graduated from George W. Wingate High School and Brooklyn College. She worked as a stockbroker for several years before moving to California with her husband. During the 1970s, she worked as a journalist for the Pacific Sun and as an aide to U.S. Representative John L. Burton. She served on the Marin County Board of Supervisors for six years and became the board's first female president. With the slogan "Barbara Boxer Gives a Damn", she was elected to the United States House of Representatives in 1982, representing California's 6th district.

Boxer won the 1992 election for the U.S. Senate. Running for a third term in 2004, she received 6.96 million votes, becoming the first person to ever get more than 6 million votes in a Senate election and set a record for the most votes in any U.S. Senate election in history, until her colleague Dianne Feinstein, the senior senator from California, surpassed that number in her 2012 re-election. Boxer and Feinstein were the first female pair of U.S. senators representing any state at the same time. Boxer was the ranking member of the Environment and Public Works Committee and the vice chair of the Select Committee on Ethics. She was also the Democratic chief deputy whip. Boxer is known for her liberal perspectives.

Boxer did not seek re-election in 2016. She was succeeded by then–California attorney general and future vice president Kamala Harris. In January 2020, Boxer joined Washington, D.C.–based lobbying firm Mercury Public Affairs as co-chairwoman. In January 2021, it was reported that Boxer was working as registered foreign agent for Hikvision, a Chinese state-sponsored surveillance company implicated in human rights abuses. After initially defending her work for Hikvision, Boxer reversed course and deregistered as a foreign agent. In October 2021, Boxer and others led a high-profile mass exodus of employees from Mercury's California office to form their own public affairs and consulting company.

== Early life, family, and education ==
Barbara Sue Levy was born in Brooklyn, New York City, to Sophie (née Silvershein) and Ira Levy, a Jewish couple. She attended public schools and graduated from George W. Wingate High School in 1958.

In 1962, she married Stewart Boxer and graduated from Brooklyn College with a bachelor's degree in economics. Barbara and Stewart Boxer moved to California in 1965.

== Early career ==
Boxer worked as a stockbroker in the early 1960s while her husband went to law school. In 1968, after relocating to California, she worked on the presidential primary campaign of antiwar challenger Eugene McCarthy. In 1970, she co-founded the anti-Vietnam War Marin Alliance.

In 1972, Boxer ran for a seat on the Marin County Board of Supervisors and lost to the incumbent Republican. From 1972 to 1974, Boxer worked as a reporter and editor for the Pacific Sun. She then managed the Marin campaign of John Burton, the brother of Phillip Burton, who then was the congressman representing southern San Francisco, California. John Burton intended to run against incumbent Republican District 6 Congressman William S. Mailliard from Belvedere, California. The district would be renumbered as the 5th District in January 1975. However, Mailliard resigned on March 5, 1974, so John Burton also ran in the special election to fill the remainder of the incumbent's 6th District term. Burton narrowly won both crowded races and was sworn into office in 1974, and Boxer became his staff aide.

In 1976, Boxer was elected to the Marin County Board of Supervisors, serving for six years. She was the board's first female president.

== U.S. House of Representatives (1983–1993) ==
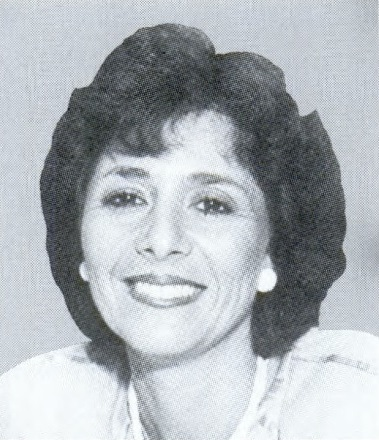
Boxer during her time in the House of Representatives

Boxer, then a Marin County supervisor, was elected to the United States House of Representatives in 1982, succeeding John Burton. Her slogan was "Barbara Boxer Gives a Damn". In the House, she represented California's 6th congressional district for five terms. She narrowly won her first election with 52 percent of the vote, but easily won re-election in her subsequent races.

Boxer was a member of the original Select Committee on Children, Youth, and Families that was established in 1983. She sat on the Armed Services committee throughout her tenure in the House.

In 1992, Boxer was implicated in the House banking scandal, which revealed that more than 450 congressional representatives and aides, herself included, wrote overdraft checks covered by the House Bank's overdraft protection. In a statement, Boxer said, "In painful retrospect, I clearly should have paid more attention to my account". She wrote a $15 check to the Deficit Reduction Fund for each of her 87 overdrafts.

In 1991, during the Anita Hill Senate hearings, where Hill accused U.S. Supreme Court nominee Clarence Thomas of sexual harassment, Boxer led a group of women House members to the Senate Judiciary Committee, demanding that the all-white, all-male Committee of Senators take Hill's charges seriously.

== U.S. Senator (1993–2017) ==
=== Elections ===
Four-term incumbent Democratic Senator Alan Cranston did not seek re-election in 1992. Boxer opted to run for Senate. In what was billed as the "Year of the Woman", Boxer beat fellow Rep. Mel Levine and Lieutenant Governor Leo McCarthy in the Democratic primary, winning 44% of the vote. In the general election, Boxer defeated Republican Bruce Herschensohn by 4.9%. A last-minute revelation that Herschensohn had patronized a strip club at least partially affected the outcome. In 1998, Boxer won a second term, beating sitting California State Treasurer Matt Fong by 10.1% of the vote. In 2004, after facing no primary opposition, Boxer defeated Republican candidate Bill Jones, the former California Secretary of State, by 20%. In 2010, Boxer defeated Republican candidate Carly Fiorina, former chief executive officer of Hewlett-Packard, by 10%. Boxer did not seek re-election in 2016.

=== Committees ===
- Committee on Commerce, Science, and Transportation
  - Subcommittee on Aviation Operations, Safety, and Security
  - Subcommittee on Consumer Protection, Product Safety, and Insurance
  - Subcommittee on Oceans, Atmosphere, Fisheries, and Coast Guard
  - Subcommittee on Surface Transportation and Merchant Marine Infrastructure, Safety, and Security
  - Subcommittee on Science and Space
- Committee on Environment and Public Works (Ranking Member)
- Committee on Foreign Relations
  - Subcommittee on Near Eastern and South and Central Asian Affairs
  - Subcommittee on East Asian and Pacific Affairs
  - Subcommittee on International Operations and Organizations, Human Rights, Democracy and Global Women's Issues (Chair)
  - Subcommittee on International Development and Foreign Assistance, Economic Affairs, and International Environmental Protection
- Select Committee on Ethics (Vice Chair)

A member of the Senate Democratic Leadership, Boxer served as the Democratic chief deputy whip, which gave her the job of lining up votes on key legislation.

=== Caucus memberships ===
- Senate Oceans Caucus
- Senate Ukraine Caucus

== Presidential politics ==
=== 2004 ===
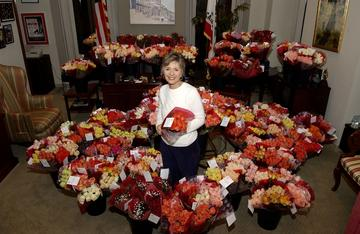
On Valentine's Day 2005, Senator Boxer received 4,500 roses for her work, including her "candid and eloquent remarks during the Rice confirmation [sic] hearings".

On January 6, 2005, Boxer joined Representative Stephanie Tubbs Jones (D-Ohio) in filing a U.S. congressional objection to the certification of Ohio's Electoral College votes in the 2004 presidential election. She called the objection her "opening shot to be able to focus the light of truth on these terrible problems in the electoral system". The Senate voted the objection down 74–1; the House voted the objection down 267–31. It was only the second congressional objection to an entire state's electoral delegation in U.S. history; the first instance was in 1877.

=== 2008 ===
As a superdelegate, Boxer had declared that she would support the winner of the California primary, which was won by Hillary Clinton. However, she reneged on that pledge and remained neutral, only officially backing Barack Obama's candidacy the day after the last primaries, once he had garnered enough delegate votes to clinch the nomination.

=== 2016 ===
Prior to Hillary Clinton's announcement, on October 20, 2013, Senator Boxer was one of 16 Democratic female senators to sign a letter endorsing Clinton as the Democratic nominee in the 2016 presidential election.

== Post-Senate career ==
After leaving the U.S. Senate, Boxer has given paid speeches; raised money for her political action committee (PAC for Change); hosted a weekly podcast with her daughter, Nicole Boxer; and worked as a lobbyist.

In April 2017, Boxer served as the keynote speaker for the Environmental Student Assembly's Earth Month at the University of Southern California, and in 2020, Boxer served as a fellow at the USC Center for the Political Future.

=== Lobbying ===
In January 2020, it was reported that Boxer had become co-chair of Mercury Public Affairs, a prominent lobbying and public affairs firm, whose corporate clients have included Airbnb and AT&T, along foreign governments such as Qatar and Turkey.

Prior to joining Mercury Public Affairs, Boxer had worked as a paid advisor to Lyft, during which time she advocated against the passage of AB-5, a California law that Lyft opposed which reclassified as "employees" many workers, including Lyft drivers, who had previously been classified as "independent contractors" under state labor law.

Boxer also has worked as a paid consultant on behalf of Poseidon Water as part of that company's effort to install a desalination plant in Huntington Beach, California, and also for CityLift Parking, a company in Oakland, California, that designs automated parking lifts.

In October 2021, Boxer, former Los Angeles mayor Antonio Villaraigosa, and former California State Assembly speaker Fabian Nunez led a high-profile mass exodus of employees from the California office of Mercury Public Affairs to set up their own public affairs and consulting firm. At the time of their departure, the press reported Mercury's California based clients included Clorox, Lyft, the California Charter Schools Association, and the Westlands Water District, the utility that oversees the heart of the state's agricultural lands in the Central Valley.

=== Foreign agent ===
On January 12, 2021, it was reported that the inaugural committee of president-elect Joe Biden returned a $500 donation from Boxer after Boxer registered as a foreign agent on behalf of Hikvision, a Chinese state-owned manufacturer of surveillance equipment. The company has been accused of involvement in the persecution of Uyghur Muslims in the Xinjiang region. In an emailed statement to the press regarding the returned donation, Boxer defended her work as a registered foreign agent by saying, "When I am asked to provide strategic advice to help a company operate in a more responsible and humane manner consistent with U.S. law in spirit and letter, it is an opportunity to make things better while helping protect and create American jobs."

Later that same day, Boxer reversed course and publicly announced on Twitter that she would deregister as a foreign agent for Hikvision, writing, "Due to the intense response to my registration I have determined that my continued work has become a negative distraction from my effort to preserve American jobs and make the company better. Therefore, I have deregistered."

== Platform and votes ==
Boxer has been described as a "liberal lion", as well as a "progressive force".

=== George W. Bush ===
Boxer and Iowa Senator Tom Harkin were the only two Senate Democrats to support Wisconsin Senator Russ Feingold's 2006 resolution to censure President George W. Bush.

==== Bush nominees ====
During the confirmation hearings for the United States secretary of state nominee Condoleezza Rice in January 2005, Boxer challenged her to admit to alleged mistakes and false statements made by the Bush administration in leading the United States into the 2003 invasion of Iraq. Along with 12 other senators, Boxer voted against confirmation. The 12 "no" votes were the most votes against a secretary of state nominee since 1825, when Henry Clay was so named.

Boxer voted against John Bolton's nomination for U.S. Ambassador to the United Nations in the Senate Foreign Relations Committee and filibustered him on the Senate floor. Because of the strong Democratic opposition, Bolton could not obtain Senate approval. However, President Bush bypassed the Senate by employing the constitutional right of recess appointment.

Boxer voted against the confirmation of Chief Justice of the United States nominee John Roberts and against the confirmation of Associate Justice nominee Samuel Alito.

=== Economy ===
On October 1, 2008, Boxer voted for the Emergency Economic Stabilization Act.

On August 26, 2013, Boxer told The Ed Show on MSNBC that the federal minimum wage should be raised to $10.00 an hour.

=== Education ===
Boxer established the Excellence in Education award to recognize teachers, parents, businesses and organizations working to make positive changes in education. Beginning in 1997, Boxer presented the Excellence in Education Award to 38 recipients.

=== Election and Electoral College reform ===
Boxer voted for the 2002 Help America Vote Act, which mandated the use of voting machines across the country, among other provisions. On February 18, 2005, Boxer and others introduced the Count Every Vote Act of 2005, which would have provided a voter-verified paper ballot for every vote cast in electronic voting machines and ensured access to voter verification for all citizens. The bill did not pass.

Boxer introduced a bill on November 15, 2016, calling for a constitutional amendment to abolish the Electoral College and to select future presidents by a simple national vote only. This bill was introduced six days after Donald Trump won the 2016 election despite losing the national popular vote to Hillary Clinton.

=== Energy ===
Boxer opposed the nuclear energy deal between the United States and India. She believed that India should not receive aid from the U.S. in the civilian nuclear energy sector until it broke its relationship with Iran.

=== Environment ===
Boxer successfully led the 2003 Senate floor battle to block oil drilling in the Arctic National Wildlife Refuge. In 2005, Boxer voted again to block oil drilling at ANWR.

Boxer introduced the National Oceans Protection Act (NOPA) of 2005.

Boxer was an original cosponsor of Senator Jim Jeffords' (I-VT) Clean Power Act.

Boxer was the Senate sponsor of the Northern California Coastal Wild Heritage Wilderness Act, which was signed into law by President George W. Bush on October 17, 2006. The bill protected 275,830 acres (1,116 km^{2}) of federal land as wilderness and 21 miles (34 km) of stream as a wild and scenic river, including such popular areas as the King Range and Cache Creek.

Boxer, along with her colleague Dianne Feinstein, voted in favor of subsidy payments to conventional commodity farm producers at the cost of subsidies for conservation-oriented farming.

=== Foreign policy ===
In 1999, the Senate passed a Boxer resolution opposing the Taliban as the official government of Afghanistan because of its human rights abuses against women.

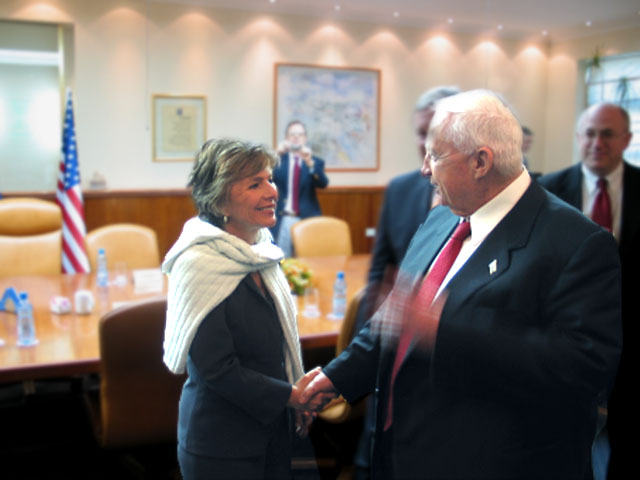
Senator Boxer meets Israeli Prime Minister Ariel Sharon in 2005.

She voted against the first Gulf War while a member of the House in 1991.

In 2012, Boxer and a bipartisan group of six senators introduced a resolution condemning Russia for aiding Syrian President Bashar al-Assad's government as the country faced civil war.

==== Iraq War ====
In October 2002, Boxer voted against the joint resolution passed by the US Congress to authorize the use of military force by the Bush administration against Iraq.

In June 2005, Senators Boxer and Russ Feingold of Wisconsin, cosponsored Senate Resolution 171 calling for a timeframe for US troop withdrawal from Iraq.

In 2005, Boxer criticized Secretary of State Condoleezza Rice's judgment in relation to the war in Iraq: "I personally believe – this is my personal view – that your loyalty to the mission you were given, to sell the war, overwhelmed your respect for the truth."

Boxer was sharply critical of US Army General David Petraeus' testimony regarding the political and military situation of Iraq in 2007, charging him with reporting while wearing "rosy glasses".

In January 2007, Boxer was in the news for comments she made when responding to Bush's plans to send an additional 20,000 troops to Iraq. "Who pays the price?" Boxer asked Secretary of State Condoleezza Rice. "I'm not going to pay a personal price. My kids are too old and my grandchild is too young. You're not going to pay a personal price with an immediate family. So who pays the price? The American military and their families... not me, not you." When Rice interjected, Boxer responded by saying, "Madam Secretary, please. I know you feel terrible about it. That's not the point. I was making the case as to who pays the price for your decisions. And the fact that this administration would move forward with this escalation with no clue as to the further price that we're going to pay militarily... I find really appalling."

=== Gun laws ===
Senator Boxer joined colleagues to pass a federal ban on various semi-automatic firearms and established the COPS program.

In the wake of the 2016 Orlando nightclub shooting, Boxer posted on Facebook that it was an "unspeakable tragedy" and she encouraged others to support "common-sense gun safety laws to protect our communities from these weapons of war."

=== Hate crimes ===
Boxer co-sponsored the Matthew Shepard Act, which expanded the federal definition of hate crimes to include crimes based on the victim's sexual orientation and gender identity.

=== Health care ===
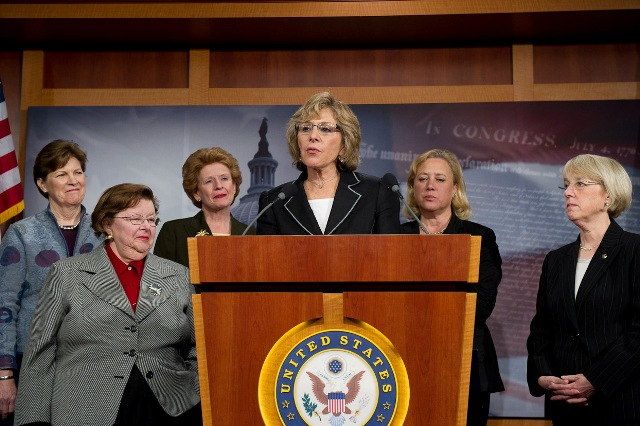
Senator Boxer joined with Senate Democratic women at a press conference to speak about women's health.

Boxer was part of a coalition to increase medical research to find cures for diseases. In 2007, she authored successful bipartisan legislation with Senator Gordon Smith to combat HIV/AIDS and tuberculosis globally. In 1997, she authored a Patients' Bill of Rights. She has written a bill to make health insurance tax-deductible and a bill to allow any American buy into the same health insurance program that members of Congress have. She supported comprehensive prescription drug coverage through Medicare and the right of all consumers to purchase lower-cost prescription drugs re-imported from Canada.

In October 2002, Boxer urged the Bush administration to take specific steps to address the causes of the steep increase in autism cases in California.

Boxer advocated for embryonic stem-cell research, asserting that it has the potential to help those with diabetes, Parkinson's disease, Alzheimer's disease, spinal cord injuries, and other diseases.

=== Intellectual property ===
Boxer supported PIPA.

=== LGBT rights ===
In 1996, Boxer was one of 14 senators to vote against the Defense of Marriage Act. She also voted against the Federal Marriage Amendment in 2004 and 2006, although when San Francisco Mayor Gavin Newsom issued a directive to the city-county clerk to issue marriage licenses to same-sex couples, she stated that she supported California's domestic partnership law but believed that marriage was between a man and a woman. She opposed Proposition 8, a constitutional amendment that prohibited same-sex marriage in California, and supported the Uniting American Families Act.

During her 2010 campaign, Boxer stated her strong support for same-sex marriage.

=== Marijuana ===
Boxer opposed reforming marijuana policy and opposed a California ballot measure to legalize and tax marijuana for those 21 and older in the state.

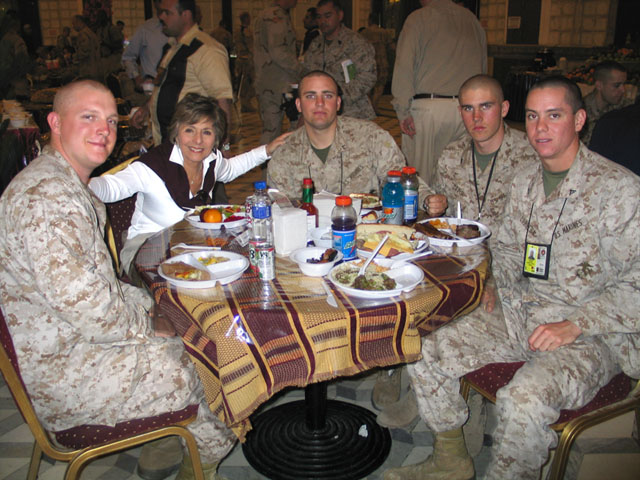
Senator Boxer has lunch with American Marines during her visit to Iraq, 22 March 2005.

=== Reproductive rights ===
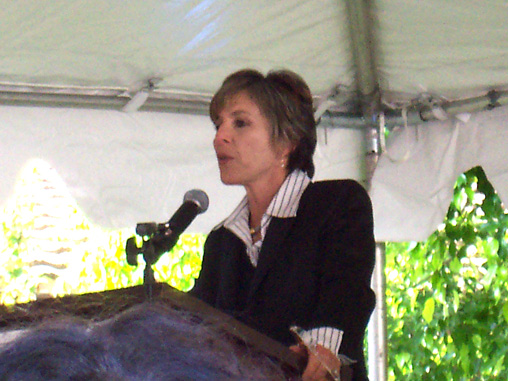
Boxer speaking at an event

As a senator, Boxer was an outspoken supporter of abortion rights. She authored the Freedom of Choice Act of 2004 and participated in the floor fight for passage of the Freedom of Access to Clinic Entrances Act.

Boxer was critical of the Stupak-Pitts Amendment to Obamacare.

=== Social Security ===
Boxer supported the then-current system of Social Security, and opposed President George W. Bush's plan for partial privatization of Social Security.

=== Surveillance ===
In June 2008, Boxer spoke in the Senate in opposition to the FISA Amendments Act of 2008, a pending bill in the United States Congress to amend the Foreign Intelligence Surveillance Act, and later broke with her counterpart Dianne Feinstein and voted against it.

== Public image ==
At 4 ft 11 in (150 cm), Boxer was one of the shortest members of the Congress. When addressing the chamber, she would sometimes stand on a portable platform, dubbed the "Boxer Box", which was carried by an aide.

=== Television appearances ===
Boxer has made cameo appearances as herself in several television shows, including Murphy Brown (1994), Gilmore Girls (2002) and Curb Your Enthusiasm (2007), as well as the 2000 film Traffic. On November 2, 2005, she made an appearance on The Daily Show with Jon Stewart to discuss her new novel, A Time To Run.

In September 2012, it was reported that Boxer and Republican Senator Olympia Snowe would appear together in an NBC sitcom. On September 20, 2012, she and Senator Snowe appeared in the fifth-season premiere of Parks and Recreation. Boxer later returned to Parks and Recreation alongside several other U.S. senators in early 2015 in the seventh season episode "Ms. Ludgate-Dwyer Goes to Washington".

In November 2016, Boxer appeared in an episode of Chelsea, presented by Chelsea Handler, entitled "Do Not Despair About Our Country", filmed shortly after the final announced result of the 2016 US presidential election, during which Handler wept about the result.

== Major speeches and statements ==
- "Excerpts from Senator Boxer's Senate Floor Statement on the Resolution Authorizing the Use of Military Force against Iraq, October 10, 2002". Archived from the original on October 17, 2002.
- Transcript from the Confirmation Hearing of Condoleezza Rice, January 18, 2005
- "On the Nomination of Alberto Gonzales to be Attorney General, February 1, 2005". Archived from the original on February 6, 2005.
- "On the President's Budget, February 7, 2005". Archived from the original on February 8, 2005.
- "On Social Security, February 11, 2005". Archived from the original on February 25, 2005.
- "Senate Floor Debate on the Arctic National Wildlife Refuge, March 16, 2005". Archived from the original on March 31, 2005.
- "Statement on Earth Day, April 20, 2005". Archived from the original on April 21, 2005.
- "On the Iraq War, July 6, 2005". Archived from the original on August 25, 2005.
- On Karl Rove's CIA Leak, July 20, 2005
- "On Her Opposition to the Confirmation of Chief Justice Nominee John Roberts, September 21, 2005". Archived from the original on September 27, 2005.
- Addressing World Affairs Council of Northern California (Video), October 13, 2006

== Books ==
Boxer's first novel, A Time to Run, was published in 2005 by San Francisco-based Chronicle Books. Her second novel, Blind Trust, was released in July 2009 by Chronicle Books.

== Personal life ==
Barbara and Stewart Boxer had two children, Doug and Nicole. On May 28, 1994, Nicole Boxer married Tony Rodham, the younger brother of Hillary Clinton, in a ceremony at the White House attended by 250 guests. (This was the first White House wedding since Tricia Nixon married Edward Cox in 1971.) Before divorcing, Boxer and Rodham had a son, Zachary, in 1995.

In 2006, Barbara and Stewart Boxer sold their house in Greenbrae, California and moved to Rancho Mirage.

On July 26, 2021, Boxer was assaulted and robbed of her mobile phone in the Jack London Square section of Oakland, California. A $2,000 reward was offered for information leading to an arrest. Boxer was not seriously injured in the attack.

== See also ==
- Women in the United States House of Representatives
- Women in the United States Senate

U.S. House of Representatives
Preceded by Phillip Burton	Member of the U.S. House of Representatives from California's 6th congressional district 1983–1993	Succeeded by Lynn Woolsey
Party political offices
Preceded by Les AuCoin, Joe Biden, Bill Bradley, Robert Byrd, Tom Daschle, Bill Hefner, Barbara B. Kennelly, George Miller, Tip O'Neill, Paul Tsongas, Tim Wirth	Response to the State of the Union address 1984; Served alongside: Max Baucus, Joe Biden, David Boren, Robert Byrd, Dante Fascell, Bill Gray, Tom Harkin, Dee Huddleston, Carl Levin, Tip O'Neill, Claiborne Pell	Succeeded by Bill Clinton; Bob Graham; Tip O'Neill
Preceded by Alan Cranston	Democratic nominee for U.S. Senator from California (Class 3); 1992, 1998, 2004, 2010	Succeeded by Kamala Harris
Preceded by John Breaux	Senate Democratic Chief Deputy Whip; 2005–2017	Succeeded by Cory Booker; Jeff Merkley; Brian Schatz
U.S. Senate
Preceded by Alan Cranston	U.S. Senator (Class 3) from California; 1993–2017; Served alongside: Dianne Feinstein	Succeeded by Kamala Harris
Preceded by Jim Inhofe	Chair of the Senate Environment Committee; 2007–2015	Succeeded by Jim Inhofe
Preceded by George Voinovich	Chair of the Senate Ethics Committee; 2007–2015	Succeeded by Johnny Isakson
Preceded by David Vitter	Ranking Member of the Senate Environment Committee; 2015–2017	Succeeded by Tom Carper
Preceded by Johnny Isakson	Ranking Member of the Senate Ethics Committee; 2015–2017	Succeeded by Chris Coons
U.S. order of precedence (ceremonial)
Preceded by Debbie Stabenow as Former U.S. Senator	Order of precedence of the United States as Former U.S. Senator	Succeeded by Pat Roberts as Former U.S. Senator
