= United States Senate Foreign Relations Subcommittee on Western Hemisphere and Global Narcotics Affairs =

The Senate Foreign Relations Subcommittee on Western Hemisphere and Narcotics Affairs was one of seven subcommittees of the Senate Foreign Relations Committee.

== Jurisdiction ==
The Subcommittee on Western Hemisphere and Narcotics Affairs was responsible for United States relations with the nations of the Western Hemisphere, including Canada and the nations of the Caribbean. The subcommittee also dealt with boundary matters, and U.S. policy with regard to the Organization of American States. Specific matters within the region that fell within the subcommittees purview are terrorism and non-proliferation; U.S. foreign assistance programs; and the promotion of U.S. trade and exports.

The subcommittee also exercised general oversight over the activities and programs of the Peace Corps and all U.S. foreign policy, programs and international cooperative efforts to combat the flow of illegal drugs or substances.

== Members, 114th Congress ==
Majority	Minority
John McCain, Arizona, Chairman; Marco Rubio, Florida; John Barrasso, Wyoming; Rand Paul, Kentucky	Tom Udall, New Mexico, Ranking Member; Barbara Boxer, California; Chris Murphy, Connecticut; Tim Kaine, Virginia
Ex officio
Bob Corker, Tennessee	Ben Cardin, Maryland

== See also ==
- United States Senate Foreign Relations Subcommittee on Western Hemisphere, Transnational Crime, Civilian Security, Democracy, Human Rights and Global Women's Issues
