= United States Senate Foreign Relations Subcommittee on State Department and USAID Management, International Operations, and Bilateral International Development =

The Subcommittee on State Department and USAID Management, International Operations, and Bilateral International Development is one of seven subcommittees of the United States Senate Foreign Relations Committee.

== Jurisdiction ==
The subcommittee’s responsibilities include all matters involving State Department, USAID, Millennium Challenge Corporation, and Peace Corps management and international operations, bilateral international development policy, and bilateral foreign assistance. This jurisdiction includes the general oversight responsibility for management and operations of the Department of State, USAID, the U.S. Agency for Global Media, and the United States Foreign Service, as well as public diplomacy matters. This subcommittee will have responsibility for reviewing the budget and operations of the State Department and USAID.

== Members, 119th Congress ==
Majority	Minority
Bill Hagerty, Tennessee, Chair; Rick Scott, Florida; John Barrasso, Wyoming; Pete Ricketts, Nebraska; Rand Paul, Kentucky	Chris Van Hollen, Maryland, Ranking Member; Chris Coons, Delaware; Tim Kaine, Virginia; Tammy Duckworth, Illinois
Ex officio
Jim Risch, Idaho	Jeanne Shaheen, New Hampshire

== Historical subcommittee members ==
=== 118th Congress ===
Majority	Minority
Ben Cardin, Maryland, Chair; Tim Kaine, Virginia; Cory Booker, New Jersey; Chris Murphy, Connecticut; Chris Coons, Delaware	Bill Hagerty, Tennessee, Ranking Member; Rand Paul, Kentucky; Ted Cruz, Texas; Pete Ricketts, Nebraska
Ex officio
Ben Cardin, Maryland	Jim Risch, Idaho

=== 117th Congress ===
Majority	Minority
Ben Cardin, Maryland, Chair; Tim Kaine, Virginia; Brian Schatz, Hawaii; Chris Murphy, Connecticut; Ed Markey, Massachusetts	Bill Hagerty, Tennessee, Ranking Member; Rand Paul, Kentucky; Ted Cruz, Texas; Ron Johnson, Wisconsin; Marco Rubio, Florida
Ex officio
Bob Menendez, New Jersey	Jim Risch, Idaho
