= A Time to Run =

2005 novel by Barbara Boxer with Mary-Rose Hayes

- Cover of the first edition
- Author: Barbara Boxer with Mary-Rose Hayes
- Language: English
- Genre: Political fiction
- Published: Chronicle Books, 2005
- Publication place: United States
- Media type: Book
- Pages: 368
- ISBN: 9780811850438
- OCLC: 61887566

A Time to Run is a political novel written by Senator Barbara Boxer with Mary-Rose Hayes. It was published by Chronicle Books and released late in 2005, to mixed and frequently partisan reviews.

== Plot summary ==
The story is set in the present day, with significant flashbacks to times beginning in the early 1970s. The protagonist is Ellen Fischer, a liberal senator from California. She is preparing for a difficult legislative battle over the conservative president's nomination of a deeply conservative female judge to the Supreme Court. Amid numerous particulars of the informal and formal governmental process in the United States, Boxer unfolds her heroine's dilemma and her past simultaneously. The dilemma is presented by a journalist, Greg Hunter, with pronounced right-wing views. Hunter is a figure from the senator's past. They had been lovers while he was in college; he lost her to his roommate, Joshua Fischer. Joshua later dies in the middle of a campaign for Senate; Ellen steps into his place and wins, launching her political career. Now, Hunter has returned, bringing with him information that could derail the judicial nominee's appointment. Fischer is buffeted by new revelations about Hunter and a well-founded distrust of his motives.

== Literary significance & criticism ==
The book was received in the spirit that has greeted other politicians' novels, such as those by Newt Gingrich and Jimmy Carter. It was received as the work of an enthusiastic amateur rather than a professional writer, despite Boxer's early experience as a journalist and the assistance of Rose. Low expectations did not prevent some reviewers from being disappointed with responses often appeared to be split on party lines. The Wall Street Journal and National Review lambasted the novel's "convoluted" plot, purple passages, and occasional grammatical errors. Center and left publications noted these flaws with more equanimity; in the San Francisco Chronicle, Daniel Handler joked that Boxer made at least as good a novelist as she would have made a senator.
