= United States Senate Foreign Relations Subcommittee on Europe and Regional Security Cooperation =

The Senate Foreign Relations Subcommittee on Europe and Regional Security Cooperation is one of seven subcommittees of the Senate Foreign Relations Committee.

== Jurisdiction ==
The subcommittee deals with all matters concerning U.S. relations with the countries in Europe and the European Union, the North Atlantic Treaty Organization, and regional intergovernmental organizations like the Organization for Security and Cooperation in Europe (except the states of Central Asia that are within the jurisdiction of the Subcommittee on Near Eastern and South Asian Affairs). This subcommittee's regional responsibilities include all matters within the geographic region, including matters relating to:

- terrorism and non-proliferation
- crime and illicit narcotics
- U.S. foreign assistance programs
- the promotion of U.S. trade and exports

In addition, this subcommittee has global responsibility for regional security cooperation.

== Members, 119th Congress ==
Majority	Minority
Steve Daines, Montana, Chair; John Barrasso, Wyoming; Pete Ricketts, Nebraska; Rand Paul, Kentucky; John Curtis, Utah	Chris Murphy, Connecticut, Ranking Member; Tammy Duckworth, Illinois; Cory Booker, New Jersey; Brian Schatz, Hawaii
Ex officio
Jim Risch, Idaho	Jeanne Shaheen, New Hampshire

== Historical subcommittee rosters ==
=== 118th Congress ===
Majority	Minority
Jeanne Shaheen, New Hampshire, Chair; Chris Murphy, Connecticut; Chris Van Hollen, Maryland; Tammy Duckworth, Illinois; Ben Cardin, Maryland	Pete Ricketts, Nebraska, Ranking Member; Rand Paul, Kentucky; John Barrasso, Wyoming; Marco Rubio, Florida
Ex officio
Ben Cardin, Maryland	Jim Risch, Idaho

=== 117th Congress ===
Majority	Minority
Jeanne Shaheen, New Hampshire, Chair; Ben Cardin, Maryland; Chris Murphy, Connecticut; Chris Van Hollen, Maryland; Chris Coons, Delaware	Ron Johnson, Wisconsin, Ranking Member; John Barrasso, Wyoming; Mitt Romney, Utah; Rob Portman, Ohio; Todd Young, Indiana
Ex officio
Bob Menendez, New Jersey	Jim Risch, Idaho

== See also ==
- United States House Foreign Affairs Subcommittee on Europe
