= United States Senate Foreign Relations Subcommittee on Africa and Global Health Policy =

The Senate Foreign Relations Subcommittee on Africa and Global Health Policy is one of seven subcommittees of the Senate Foreign Relations Committee.

== Jurisdiction ==
The subcommittee deals with all matters concerning U.S. relations with countries in Africa (except those, like the countries of North Africa, specifically covered by other subcommittees), as well as regional intergovernmental organizations like the African Union and the Economic Community of West African States. This subcommittee’s regional responsibilities include all matters within the geographic region, including matters relating to: (1) terrorism and non-proliferation; (2) crime and illicit narcotics; (3) U.S. foreign assistance programs; and (4) the promotion of U.S. trade and exports.

In addition, this subcommittee has global responsibility for health-related policy, including disease outbreak and response.

== Members, 119th Congress ==
Majority	Minority
Ted Cruz, Texas, Chair; Steve Daines, Montana; Rand Paul, Kentucky; John Cornyn, Texas; John Barrasso, Wyoming	Cory Booker, New Jersey, Ranking Member; Chris Coons, Delaware; Jeff Merkley, Oregon; Chris Van Hollen, Maryland
Ex officio
Jim Risch, Idaho	Jeanne Shaheen, New Hampshire

== Historical subcommittee rosters ==
=== 118th Congress ===
Majority	Minority
Cory Booker, New Jersey, Chair; Jeff Merkley, Oregon; Chris Coons, Delaware; Brian Schatz, Hawaii; Chris Van Hollen, Maryland	Tim Scott, South Carolina, Ranking Member; Todd Young, Indiana; John Barrasso, Wyoming; Rand Paul, Kentucky
Ex officio
Ben Cardin, Maryland	Jim Risch, Idaho

=== 117th Congress ===
Majority	Minority
Chris Van Hollen, Maryland, Chair; Cory Booker, New Jersey; Tim Kaine, Virginia; Jeff Merkley, Oregon; Chris Coons, Delaware	Mike Rounds, South Dakota, Ranking Member; Marco Rubio, Florida; Todd Young, Indiana; John Barrasso, Wyoming; Rand Paul, Kentucky
Ex officio
Bob Menendez, New Jersey	Jim Risch, Idaho

== See also ==
- United States House Foreign Affairs Subcommittee on Africa and Global Health
