= United States Senate Foreign Relations Subcommittee on Western Hemisphere, Transnational Crime, Civilian Security, Democracy, Human Rights, and Global Women's Issues =

The Senate Foreign Relations Subcommittee on Western Hemisphere, Transnational Crime, Civilian Security, Democracy, Human Rights, and Global Women's Issues is one of seven subcommittees of the Senate Foreign Relations Committee.

== Jurisdiction ==
This subcommittee deals with all matters concerning U.S. relations with the countries of the Western Hemisphere, including Canada, Mexico, Central, and South America, Cuba, and the other countries in the Caribbean, as well as the Organization of American States. This subcommittee’s regional responsibilities include all matters within the geographic region, including matters relating to (1) terrorism and nuclear non-proliferation; (2) crime and illicit narcotics; (3) U.S. foreign assistance programs; and (4) the promotion of U.S. trade and exports.

Also, this subcommittee has global responsibility for transnational crime, trafficking in persons (also known as modern slavery or human trafficking), global narcotics flows, civilian security, democracy, human rights, and global women’s issues.

== Members, 119th Congress ==
Majority	Ranking Member
John Curtis, Utah, Chair; John Cornyn, Texas; Bill Hagerty, Tennessee; Rick Scott, Florida; Ted Cruz, Texas	Tim Kaine, Virginia, Ranking Member; Jeff Merkley, Oregon; Jacky Rosen, Nevada; Chris Murphy, Connecticut
Ex officio
Jim Risch, Idaho	Jeanne Shaheen, New Hampshire

== Historical subcommittee rosters ==
=== 118th Congress ===
Majority	Minority
Tim Kaine, Virginia, Chair; Jeff Merkley, Oregon; Ben Cardin, Maryland; Jeanne Shaheen, New Hampshire; Chris Murphy, Connecticut	Marco Rubio, Florida, Ranking Member; Ted Cruz, Texas; Todd Young, Indiana; Tim Scott, South Carolina
Ex officio
Ben Cardin, Maryland	Jim Risch, Idaho

=== 117th Congress ===
Majority	Minority
Tim Kaine, Virginia, Chair; Jeff Merkley, Oregon; Ben Cardin, Maryland; Jeanne Shaheen, New Hampshire; Ed Markey, Massachusetts	Marco Rubio, Florida, Ranking Member; Rob Portman, Ohio; John Barrasso, Wyoming; Bill Hagerty, Tennessee; Ted Cruz, Texas
Ex officio
Bob Menendez, New Jersey	Jim Risch, Idaho

== See also ==
U.S. House Financial Services Subcommittee on International Organizations, Human Rights, and Oversight
