= United States Senate Foreign Relations Subcommittee on Near East, South Asia, Central Asia, and Counterterrorism =

The Senate Foreign Relations Subcommittee on Near East, South Asia, Central Asia, and Counterterrorism is one of seven subcommittees of the Senate Foreign Relations Committee.

== Jurisdiction ==
This subcommittee deals with all matters concerning U.S. relations with the countries of the Middle East, North Africa, South Asia, and Central Asia, as well as regional intergovernmental organizations. This subcommittee's regional responsibilities include all matters within the geographic region, including matters relating to: (1) terrorism and non-proliferation; (2) crime and illicit narcotics; (3) U.S. foreign assistance programs; and (4) the promotion of U.S. trade and exports.

In addition, this subcommittee has global responsibility for counterterrorism matters.

== Members, 119th Congress ==
Majority	Minority
Dave McCormick, Pennsylvania, Chair; Ted Cruz, Texas; Rick Scott, Florida; Mike Lee, Utah; Steve Daines, Montana	Jacky Rosen, Nevada, Ranking Member; Chris Murphy, Connecticut; Tim Kaine, Virginia; Cory Booker, New Jersey
Ex officio
Jim Risch, Idaho	Jeanne Shaheen, New Hampshire

== Historical subcommittee rosters ==
=== 118th Congress ===
Majority	Minority
Chris Murphy, Connecticut, Chair; Ben Cardin, Maryland; Jeanne Shaheen, New Hampshire; Tim Kaine, Virginia; Cory Booker, New Jersey	Todd Young, Indiana, Ranking Member; Mitt Romney, Utah; Ted Cruz, Texas; Marco Rubio, Florida
Ex officio
Ben Cardin, Maryland	Jim Risch, Idaho

=== 117th Congress ===
Majority	Minority
Chris Murphy, Connecticut, Chair; Jeanne Shaheen, New Hampshire; Ed Markey, Massachusetts; Cory Booker, New Jersey; Chris Van Hollen, Maryland	Todd Young, Indiana, Ranking Member; Rand Paul, Kentucky; Ted Cruz, Texas; Mitt Romney, Utah; Bill Hagerty, Tennessee
Ex officio
Bob Menendez, New Jersey	Jim Risch, Idaho

== See also ==
U.S. House Financial Services Subcommittee on the Middle East and South Asia
