= United States Senate Foreign Relations Subcommittee on East Asia, The Pacific, and International Cybersecurity Policy =

The Senate Foreign Relations Subcommittee on East Asia, The Pacific, and International Cybersecurity Policy is one of seven subcommittees of the Senate Foreign Relations Committee.

== Jurisdiction ==
The subcommittee deals with all matters concerning U.S. relations with the countries of East Asia and the Pacific as well as regional intergovernmental organizations like the Association of South East Asian Nations and the Asia-Pacific Economic Cooperation forum. This subcommittee’s regional responsibilities include all matters within the geographic region, including matters relating to: (1) terrorism and non-proliferation; (2) crime and illicit narcotics; (3) U.S. foreign assistance programs; and (4) the promotion of U.S. trade and exports.

In addition, this subcommittee has global responsibility for international cybersecurity and space policy.

== Members, 119th Congress ==
Majority	Minority
Pete Ricketts, Nebraska, Chair; Dave McCormick, Pennsylvania; John Curtis, Utah; John Cornyn, Texas; Mike Lee, Utah	Chris Coons, Delaware, Ranking Member; Jeff Merkley, Oregon; Brian Schatz, Hawaii; Chris Van Hollen, Maryland
Ex officio
Jim Risch, Idaho	Jeanne Shaheen, New Hampshire

== Historical subcommittee rosters ==
=== 118th Congress ===
Majority	Minority
Chris Van Hollen, Maryland, Chair; Jeff Merkley, Oregon; Brian Schatz, Hawaii; Tammy Duckworth, Illinois; Chris Coons, Delaware	Mitt Romney, Utah, Ranking Member; Tim Scott, South Carolina; Bill Hagerty, Tennessee; Pete Ricketts, Nebraska
Ex officio
Ben Cardin, Maryland	Jim Risch, Idaho

=== 117th Congress ===
Majority	Minority
Ed Markey, Massachusetts, Chair; Chris Coons, Delaware; Chris Murphy, Connecticut; Brian Schatz, Hawaii; Jeff Merkley, Oregon	Mitt Romney, Utah, Ranking Member; Ted Cruz, Texas; Ron Johnson, Wisconsin; Mike Rounds, South Dakota; Bill Hagerty, Tennessee
Ex officio
Bob Menendez, New Jersey	Jim Risch, Idaho

== See also ==
U.S. House Financial Services Subcommittee on Asia, the Pacific, and the Global Environment
