= United States Senate Foreign Relations Subcommittee on Multilateral International Development, Multilateral Institutions, and International Economic, Energy and Environmental Policy =

The Senate Foreign Relations Subcommittee on International Development, Multilateral Institutions, and International Economic, Energy and Environmental Policy is one of seven subcommittees of the Senate Foreign Relations Committee.

== Jurisdiction ==
The subcommittee’s responsibilities include general oversight responsibility for U.S. multilateral international development policy, multilateral foreign assistance, and all U.S. mandatory and voluntary contributions to international organizations and relationship with such entities, including the U.N. and its affiliated agencies. The subcommittee’s responsibilities also include matters related to international monetary policy, including U.S. participation in international financial institutions and trade organizations, U.S. foreign economic policy, including export enhancement and trade promotion, international investment, international trade, protection of intellectual property, and technology transfer, as well as international energy policy and environmental policy, including matters related to the oceans and the Arctic.

== Members, 119th Congress ==
Majority	Minority
Mike Lee, Utah, Chair; Rand Paul, Kentucky; Dave McCormick, Pennsylvania; John Barrasso, Wyoming; Bill Hagerty, Tennessee	Tammy Duckworth, Illinois, Ranking Member; Brian Schatz, Hawaii; Jacky Rosen, Nevada; Chris Coons, Delaware
Ex officio
Jim Risch, Idaho	Jeanne Shaheen, New Hampshire

== Historical subcommittee rosters ==
=== 118th Congress ===
Majority	Minority
Tammy Duckworth, Illinois, Chair; Chris Coons, Delaware; Brian Schatz, Hawaii; Jeanne Shaheen, New Hampshire; Tim Kaine, Virginia	John Barrasso, Wyoming, Ranking Member; Mitt Romney, Utah; Bill Hagerty, Tennessee; Rand Paul, Kentucky
Ex officio
Ben Cardin, Maryland	Jim Risch, Idaho

=== 117th Congress ===
Majority	Minority
Chris Coons, Delaware, Chair; Brian Schatz, Hawaii; Cory Booker, New Jersey; Ben Cardin, Maryland; Jeanne Shaheen, New Hampshire	Todd Young, Indiana, Ranking Member; Rob Portman, Ohio; Rand Paul, Kentucky; John Barrasso, Wyoming; Mike Rounds, South Dakota
Ex officio
Bob Menendez, New Jersey	Jim Risch, Idaho

== See also ==
- U.S. House Foreign Affairs Subcommittee on Asia, the Pacific, and the Global Environment
- U.S. House Foreign Affairs Subcommittee on International Organizations, Human Rights, and Oversight
