= United States Senate Committee on Foreign Relations =

Standing committee of the U.S. Senate which debates foreign policy, diplomacy, and aid

Senate Foreign Relations Committee
Standing committee
- Active United States Senate; 119th Congress

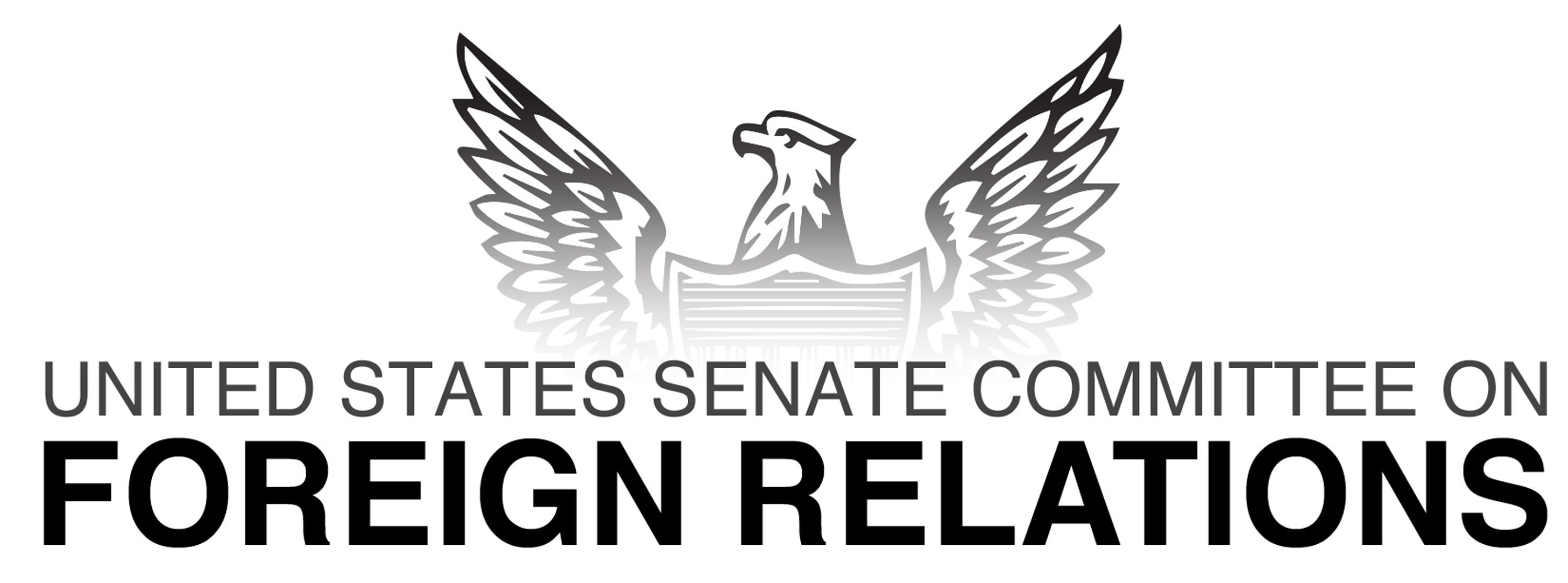

History
- Formed: 1816

Leadership
- Chair: Jim Risch (R); Since January 3, 2025
- Ranking Member: Jeanne Shaheen (D); Since January 3, 2025

Structure
- Seats: 22 members
- Political parties: Majority (12): Republican (12); Minority (10): Democratic (10)

Jurisdiction
- Policy areas: Foreign policy, aid, diplomacy
- Oversight authority: Department of State; Agency for International Development
- House counterpart: House Committee on Foreign Affairs

Meeting place
- 423 Dirksen Senate Office Building; Washington, D.C.

Website
- foreign.senate.gov

Rules
- Rule XXV.1.(j), Standing Rules of the Senate; Rules of the Committee on Foreign Relations

The United States Senate Committee on Foreign Relations is a standing committee of the U.S. Senate charged with leading foreign-policy legislation and debate in the Senate. It is generally responsible for authorizing and overseeing foreign aid programs; arms sales and training for national allies; and holding confirmation hearings for high-level positions in the Department of State. Its sister committee in the House of Representatives is the Committee on Foreign Affairs. (Note: Renamed from Committee on International Relations by the 110th Congress in January 2007.)

Along with the Finance and Judiciary committees, the Foreign Relations Committee is among the oldest in the Senate, dating to the initial creation of committees in 1816. It has played a leading role in several important treaties and foreign policy initiatives throughout U.S. history, including the Alaska Purchase, the establishment of the United Nations, and the passage of the Marshall Plan. The committee has also produced eight U.S. presidents—Andrew Jackson, James Buchanan, Andrew Johnson, Benjamin Harrison, Warren Harding, John F. Kennedy, Barack Obama, and Joe Biden (Buchanan and Biden serving as chair)—and 19 secretaries of state. Notable members have included Arthur Vandenberg, Henry Cabot Lodge, and William Fulbright.

The Foreign Relations Committee is considered one of the most powerful and prestigious in the Senate, due to its long history, broad influence on U.S. foreign policy, jurisdiction over all diplomatic nominations, and its being the only Senate committee to deliberate and report treaties.

From 2021 to 2023, the Foreign Relations Committee was chaired by Democratic senator Bob Menendez of New Jersey, until he stepped down as chair after facing federal corruption charges.

== Role ==
In 1943, a confidential analysis of the Senate Foreign Relations Committee by British scholar Isaiah Berlin for the Foreign Office stated:

The Senate of the United States ... keeps a close watch on foreign policy, not merely in theory but in practice. The two-thirds majority of the Senate needed for the ratification of all foreign treaties is only the best known of its powers, but its general control over all legislation and its power of veto over the appointment of ambassadors, and other high public officials, and the influence of its views over public opinion, give it a unique position in the determination of United States foreign policy. The organ within the Senate which moulds this policy is the Foreign Relations Committee, which has in its power to alter, delay and, under certain political circumstances, to veto almost any piece of major policy in this field.

== History ==
Between 1887 and 1907, Alabama Democrat John Tyler Morgan played a leading role on the committee. Morgan called for a canal linking the Atlantic and Pacific oceans through Nicaragua, enlarging the merchant marine and the Navy, and acquiring Hawaii, Puerto Rico, the Philippines and Cuba. He expected Latin American and Asian markets would become a new export market for Alabama's cotton, coal, iron, and timber. The canal would make trade with the Pacific much more feasible, and an enlarged military would protect that new trade. By 1905, most of his dreams had become reality, with the canal passing through Panama instead of Nicaragua.

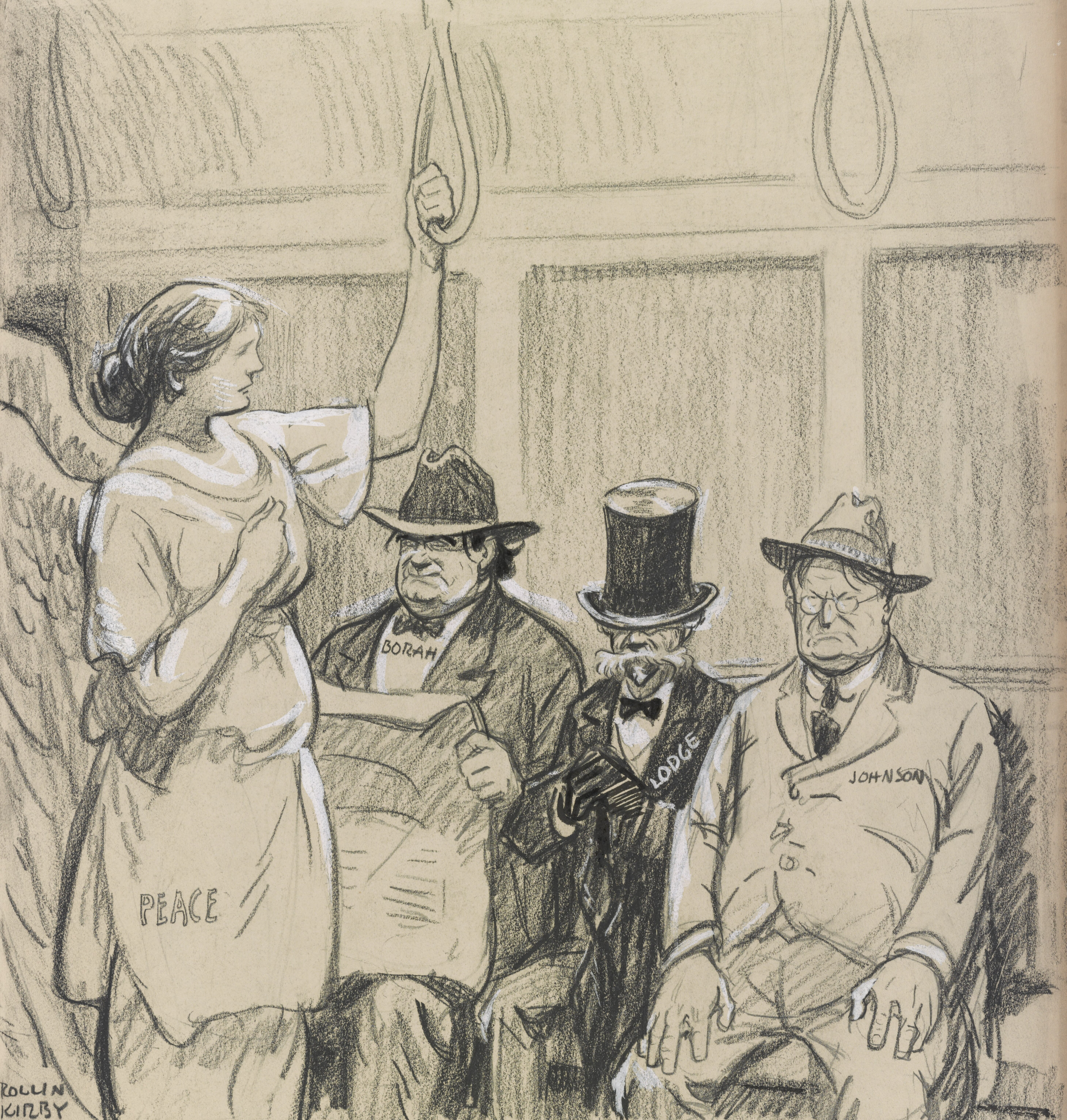
Refusing to give the lady [Peace Treaty of Versailles] a seat—by Senators Borah, Lodge and Johnson, c. 1919

During World War II, the committee took the lead in rejecting traditional isolationism and designing a new internationalist foreign policy based on the assumption that the United Nations would be a much more effective force than the old discredited League of Nations. Of special concern was the insistence that Congress play a central role in postwar foreign policy, as opposed to its ignorance of the main decisions made during the war. Republican senator Arthur Vandenberg played the central role.

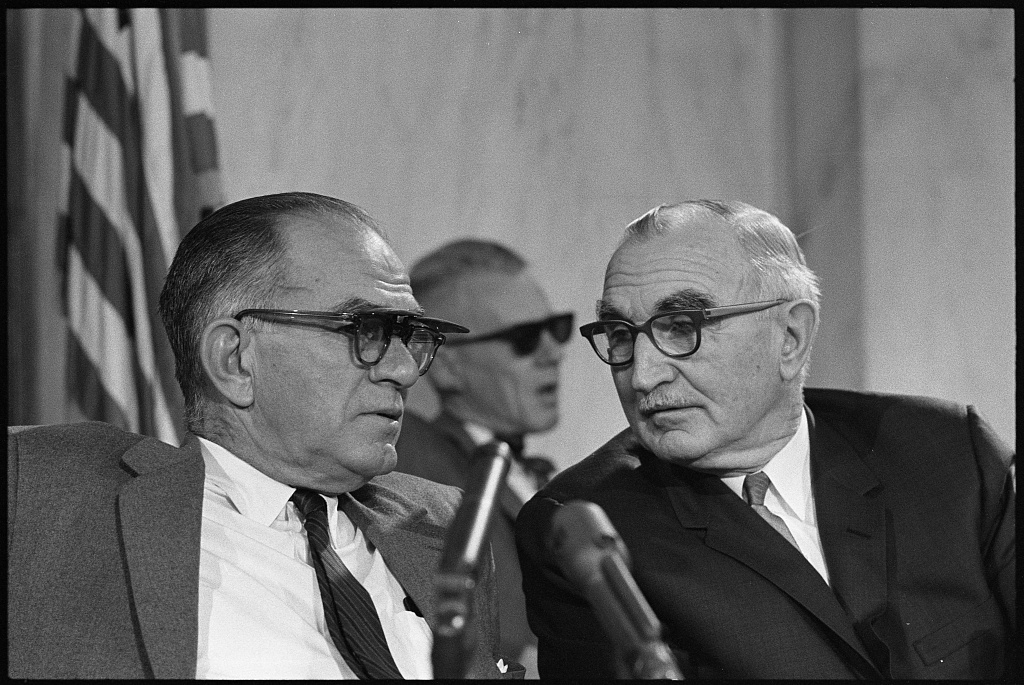
Committee chair Senator J. William Fulbright (left) with Senator Wayne Morse during a hearing on the Vietnam War in 1966

In 1966, as tensions over the Vietnam War escalated, the committee set up hearings on possible relations with Communist China. Witnesses, especially academic specialists on East Asia, suggested to the American public that it was time to adopt a new policy of containment without isolation. The hearings Indicated that American public opinion toward China had moved away from hostility and toward cooperation. The hearings had a long-term impact when Richard Nixon became president, discarded containment, and began a policy of détente with China. The problem remained of how to deal simultaneously with the Chinese government on Taiwan after formal recognition was accorded to the Beijing government. The committee drafted the Taiwan Relations Act (US, 1979) which enabled the United States both to maintain friendly relations with Taiwan and to develop fresh relations with China.

In response to conservative criticism that the state department lacked hardliners, President Ronald Reagan in 1981 nominated Ernest W. Lefever as Assistant Secretary of State. Lefever performed poorly at his confirmation hearings and the Senate Committee on Foreign Relations rejected his nomination by vote of 4–13, prompting Lefever to withdraw his name. Elliott Abrams filled the position.

Republican senator Jesse Helms, a staunch conservative, was committee chair in the late 1990s. He pushed for reform of the UN by blocking payment of U.S. membership dues.

Bertie Bowman served as a staffer on the FRC from 1966 to 1990 and as the hearing coordinator from 2000 to 2021.

== Members, 119th Congress ==
Majority	Minority
Jim Risch, Idaho, Chair; Pete Ricketts, Nebraska; Dave McCormick, Pennsylvania; Steve Daines, Montana; Bill Hagerty, Tennessee; John Barrasso, Wyoming; Mike Lee, Utah; Rand Paul, Kentucky; Ted Cruz, Texas; Rick Scott, Florida; John Curtis, Utah; John Cornyn, Texas	Jeanne Shaheen, New Hampshire, Ranking Member; Chris Coons, Delaware; Chris Murphy, Connecticut; Tim Kaine, Virginia; Jeff Merkley, Oregon; Cory Booker, New Jersey; Brian Schatz, Hawaii; Chris Van Hollen, Maryland; Tammy Duckworth, Illinois; Jacky Rosen, Nevada

=== Subcommittees ===
Subcommittees	Chair	Ranking Member
Africa and Global Health Policy	Ted Cruz (R-TX)	Cory Booker (D-NJ)
East Asia, The Pacific, and International Cybersecurity Policy	Pete Ricketts (R-NE)	Chris Coons (D-DE)
Europe and Regional Security Cooperation	Steve Daines (R-MT)	Chris Murphy (D-CT)
Multilateral International Development, Multilateral Institutions, and International Economic, Energy and Environmental Policy	Mike Lee (R-UT)	Tammy Duckworth (D-IL)
Near East, South Asia, Central Asia, and Counterterrorism	Dave McCormick (R-PA)	Jacky Rosen (D-NV)
State Department and USAID Management, International Operations, and Bilateral International Development	Bill Hagerty (R-TN)	Chris Van Hollen (D-MD)
Western Hemisphere, Transnational Crime, Civilian Security, Democracy, Human Rights and Global Women's Issues	John Curtis (R-UT)	Tim Kaine (D-VA)

== Chairs (1816–present) ==
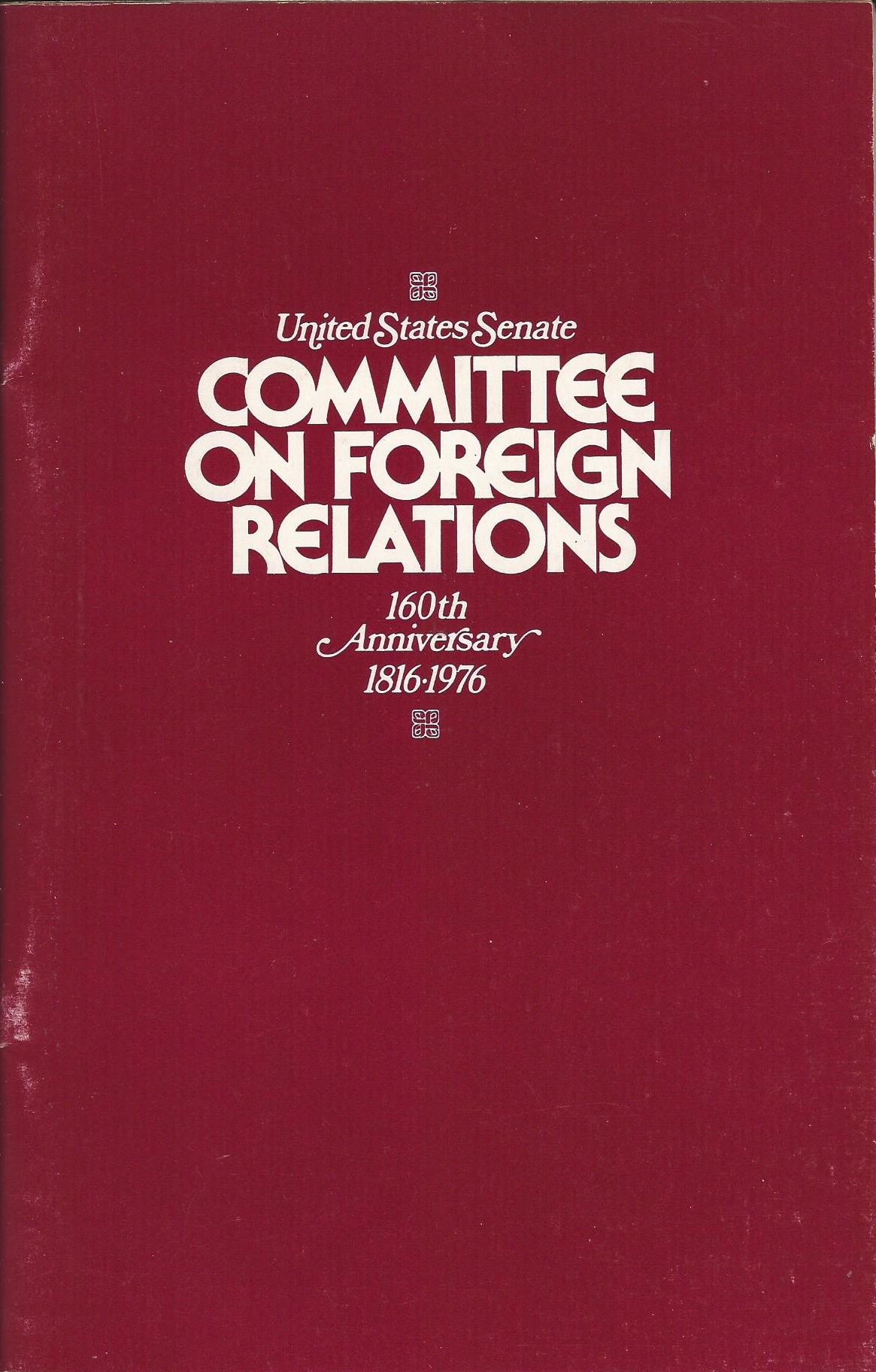
1976 publication of the Senate Foreign Relations Committee on the occasion of its 160th anniversary

Former chairs are listed below.

Name	Party	State	Start	End
James Barbour	Democratic-Republican	VA	1816	1818
Nathaniel Macon	Democratic-Republican	NC	1818	1819
James Brown	Democratic-Republican	LA	1819	1820
James Barbour	Democratic-Republican	VA	1820	1821
Rufus King	Federalist	NY	1821	1822
James Barbour	Democratic-Republican	VA	1822	1825
Nathaniel Macon	Democratic-Republican	NC	1825	1826
Nathan Sanford	Democratic-Republican	NY	1826	1827
Nathaniel Macon	Democratic-Republican	NC	1827	1828
Littleton Tazewell	Democratic	VA	1828	1832
John Forsyth	Democratic	GA	1832	1833
William Wilkins	Democratic	PA	1833	1834
Henry Clay	Whig	KY	1834	1836
James Buchanan	Democratic	PA	1836	1841
William Rives	Whig	VA	1841	1842
William Archer	Whig	VA	1842	1845
William Allen	Democratic	OH	1845	1846
Ambrose Sevier	Democratic	AR	1846	1848
Edward Hannegan	Democratic	IN	1848	1849
Thomas Benton	Democratic	MO	1849	
William King	Democratic	AL	1849	1850
Henry Foote	Democratic	MS	1850	1851
James Mason	Democratic	VA	1851	1861
Charles Sumner	Republican	MA	1861	1871
Simon Cameron	Republican	PA	1871	1877
Hannibal Hamlin	Republican	ME	1877	1879
William Eaton	Democratic	CT	1879	1881
Ambrose Burnside	Republican	RI	1881	
George Edmunds	Republican	VT	1881	
William Windom	Republican	MN	1881	1883
John Miller	Republican	CA	1883	1886
John Sherman	Republican	OH	1886	1893
John Morgan	Democratic	AL	1893	1895
John Sherman	Republican	OH	1895	1897
William Frye; Acting	Republican	ME	1897	
Cushman Davis	Republican	MN	1897	1900
Shelby Cullom	Republican	IL	1901	1911
Augustus Bacon	Democratic	GA	1913	1914
William Stone	Democratic	MO	1914	1918
Gilbert Hitchcock	Democratic	NE	1918	1919
Henry Lodge	Republican	MA	1919	1924
William Borah	Republican	ID	1924	1933
Key Pittman	Democratic	NV	1933	1940
Walter George	Democratic	GA	1940	1941
Tom Connally	Democratic	TX	1941	1947
Arthur Vandenberg	Republican	MI	1947	1949
Tom Connally	Democratic	TX	1949	1953
Alexander Wiley	Republican	WI	1953	1955
Walter George	Democratic	GA	1955	1957
Theodore Green	Democratic	RI	1957	1959
Bill Fulbright	Democratic	AR	1959	1975
John Sparkman	Democratic	AL	1975	1979
Frank Church	Democratic	ID	1979	1981
Chuck Percy	Republican	IL	1981	1985
Richard Lugar	Republican	IN	1985	1987
Claiborne Pell	Democratic	RI	1987	1995
Jesse Helms	Republican	NC	1995	2001
Joe Biden	Democratic	DE	2001	
Jesse Helms	Republican	NC	2001	
Joe Biden	Democratic	DE	2001	2003
Richard Lugar	Republican	IN	2003	2007
Joe Biden	Democratic	DE	2007	2009
John Kerry	Democratic	MA	2009	2013
Bob Menendez	Democratic	NJ	2013	2015
Bob Corker	Republican	TN	2015	2019
Jim Risch	Republican	ID	2019	2021
Bob Menendez	Democratic	NJ	2021	2023
Ben Cardin	Democratic	MD	2023	2025
Jim Risch	Republican	ID	2025	present

== Ranking members ==
Name	Party	State	Start	End
Rufus King	Federalist	NY	1816	1817
George Troup	Democratic-Republican	GA	1817	1818
Rufus King	Federalist	NY	1818	1819
James Barbour	Democratic-Republican	VA	1819	1820
James Brown	Democratic-Republican	LA	1820	1822
Nathaniel Macon	Democratic-Republican	NC	1822	1823
Andrew Jackson	Democratic-Republican	TN	1823	1824
Nathaniel Macon	Democratic-Republican	NC	1824	1825
Elijah Mills	Federalist	MA	1825	1826
Samuel Bell	Democratic-Republican (1826–1827)	NH	1826	1828
Samuel Bell	National Republican (1827–1828)	NH	1826	1828
John Berrien	Jacksonian	GA	1828	1829
Samuel Bell	National Republican	NH	1829	1831
William King	Jacksonian	AL	1831	1832
Wille Mangum	Jacksonian	NC	1832	1833
John Forsyth	Jacksonian	GA	1833	1834
Peleg Sprague	National Republican	ME	1834	1835
Wille Mangum	National Republican	NC	1835	1836
John King	Democratic	GA	1834	1838
Henry Clay	Whig	KY	1838	1839
Bedford Brown	Democratic	NC	1839	1840
John Calhoun	Democratic	SC	1840	1841
James Buchanan	Democratic	PA	1841	1845
Charles Atherton	Democratic	NH	1845	1847
Edward Hannegan	Democratic	IN	1847	1848
Wille Mangum	Whig	NC	1848	1849
Daniel Webster	Whig	MA	1849	
Wille Mangum	Whig	NC	1849	1850
Stephen Douglas	Democratic	IL	1850	1851
Henry Dodge	Democratic	WI	1851	
Wille Mangum	Whig	NC	1851	1853
John Clayton	Whig	DE	1853	1855
John Slidell	Democratic	LA	1855	1856
John Weller	Democratic	CA	1856	1857
Trusten Polk	Democratic	MO	1857	1861
Ira Harris	Republican	NY	1861	
David Wilmot	Republican	PA	1861	
Trusten Polk	Democratic	MO	1861	1862
Garrett Davis	Unionist	KY	1862 (Note: Appointed to the committee after Polk was expelled from the Senate.)	
John Henderson	Democratic	MO	1862	1863
Reverdy Johnson	Democratic	MD	1863	1864
Ira Harris	Republican	NY	1864	1865
Solomon Foot	Republican	VT	1865	
Benjamin Wade	Republican	OH	1865	1866
Joseph Fowler	Union Democratic	TN	1866	1867
Oliver Morton	Republican	IN	1867	1868
James Patterson	Republican	NH	1868	1869
Oliver Morton	Republican	IN	1869	1871
James Patterson	Republican	NH	1871	1873
Frederick Frelinghuysen	Republican	NJ	1873	1875
Roscoe Conkling	Republican	NY	1875	1877
Stanley Matthews	Republican	OH	1877	1879
Hannibal Hamlin	Republican	ME	1879	1881
Thomas Ferry	Republican	ME	1881	1883
John Morgan	Democratic	AL	1883	1885
William Frye	Republican	ME	1885	1887
John Morgan	Democratic	AL	1887	1893
John Daniel	Democratic	VA	1893	1895
Henry Lodge	Republican	MA	1895	1897
John Morgan	Democratic	AL	1897	
David Turpie	Democratic	IN	1897	1899
Joseph Foraker	Republican	OH	1899	1901
John Morgan	Democratic	AL	1901	1903
Charles Fairbanks	Republican	IN	1903	1905
John Spooner	Republican	WI	1905	1907
Augustus Bacon	Democratic	GA	1907	1909
Thomas Carter	Republican	MT	1909	1911
Theodore Burton	Republican	OH	1911	1913
Claude Swanson	Democratic	CA	1913	1915
Henry Lodge	Republican	MA	1915	1917
John Shields	Democratic	TN	1917	1919
Hiram Johnson	Republican	CA	1919	1921
Harry New	Republican	IN	1921	1923
James Wadsworth	Republican	NY	1923	1925
Claude Swanson	Democratic	CA	1923	1929
Bob La Follette	Republican	OH	1929	1931
Claude Swanson	Democratic	CA	1931	1933
William Borah	Republican	ID	1933	1941
Hiram Johnson	Republican	CA	1941	1945
Arthur Capper	Republican	KS	1945	1947
Tom Connally	Democratic	TX	1947	1949
Arthur Vandenberg	Republican	MI	1949	1951
Alexander Wiley	Republican	WI	1951	1953
Walter George	Democratic	GA	1953	1955
Alexander Wiley	Republican	WI	1955	1963
Bourke Hickenlooper	Republican	IA	1963	1969
Karl Mundt	Republican	SD	1969	1972
George Aiken	Republican	VT	1972	1975
Clifford Case	Republican	NJ	1975	1979
Jacob Javits	Republican	NY	1979	1981
Claiborne Pell	Democratic	RI	1981	1987
Richard Lugar	Republican	IN	1987 (Note: Lugar briefly held the ranking position while Helms attempted to succeed him. Lugar kept the position with the support of the committee's Republicans until a vote by the full Senate Republican Conference overruled them and installed Helms.)	
Jesse Helms	Republican	NC	1987	1995
Joe Biden	Democratic	DE	1997	2001
Jesse Helms	Republican	NC	2001	2003
Joe Biden	Democratic	DE	2003	2007
Richard Lugar	Republican	IN	2007	2013
Bob Corker	Republican	TN	2013	2015
Bob Menendez	Democratic	NJ	2015	
Ben Cardin	Democratic	MD	2015	2018
Bob Menendez	Democratic	NJ	2018	2021
Jim Risch	Republican	ID	2021	2025
Jeanne Shaheen	Democratic	NH	2025	present

== Historical committee rosters ==
=== 118th Congress ===
Majority	Minority
Ben Cardin, Maryland, Chair (from September 25, 2023); Bob Menendez, New Jersey, (Chair until September 22, 2023, member until August 20, 2024); Jeanne Shaheen, New Hampshire; Chris Coons, Delaware; Chris Murphy, Connecticut; Tim Kaine, Virginia; Jeff Merkley, Oregon; Cory Booker, New Jersey; Brian Schatz, Hawaii; Chris Van Hollen, Maryland; Tammy Duckworth, Illinois; George Helmy, New Jersey (September 10, 2024–December 8, 2024); Andy Kim, New Jersey (from December 10, 2024)	Jim Risch, Idaho, Ranking Member; Marco Rubio, Florida; Mitt Romney, Utah; Pete Ricketts, Nebraska; Rand Paul, Kentucky; Todd Young, Indiana; John Barrasso, Wyoming; Ted Cruz, Texas; Bill Hagerty, Tennessee; Tim Scott, South Carolina

Subcommittees

Subcommittees	Chair	Ranking Member
Africa and Global Health Policy	Cory Booker (D-NJ)	Tim Scott (R-SC)
East Asia, The Pacific, and International Cybersecurity Policy	Chris Van Hollen (D-MD)	Mitt Romney (R-UT)
Europe and Regional Security Cooperation	Jeanne Shaheen (D-NH)	Pete Ricketts (R-NE)
Multilateral International Development, Multilateral Institutions, and International Economic, Energy and Environmental Policy	Tammy Duckworth (D-IL)	John Barrasso (R-WY)
Near East, South Asia, Central Asia, and Counterterrorism	Chris Murphy (D-CT)	Todd Young (R-IN)
State Department and USAID Management, International Operations, and Bilateral International Development	Ben Cardin (D-MD)	Bill Hagerty (R-TN)
Western Hemisphere, Transnational Crime, Civilian Security, Democracy, Human Rights and Global Women's Issues	Tim Kaine (D-VA)	Marco Rubio (R-FL)

=== 117th Congress ===
Majority	Minority
Bob Menendez, New Jersey, Chair; Ben Cardin, Maryland; Jeanne Shaheen, New Hampshire; Chris Coons, Delaware; Chris Murphy, Connecticut; Tim Kaine, Virginia; Ed Markey, Massachusetts; Jeff Merkley, Oregon; Cory Booker, New Jersey; Brian Schatz, Hawaii; Chris Van Hollen, Maryland	Jim Risch, Idaho, Ranking Member; Marco Rubio, Florida; Ron Johnson, Wisconsin; Mitt Romney, Utah; Rob Portman, Ohio; Rand Paul, Kentucky; Todd Young, Indiana; Ted Cruz, Texas; John Barrasso, Wyoming; Mike Rounds, South Dakota; Bill Hagerty, Tennessee

Subcommittees

Subcommittees	Chair	Ranking Member
Africa and Global Health Policy	Chris Van Hollen (D-MD)	Mike Rounds (R-SD)
East Asia, The Pacific, and International Cybersecurity Policy	Ed Markey (D-MA)	Mitt Romney (R-UT)
Europe and Regional Security Cooperation	Jeanne Shaheen (D-NH)	Ron Johnson (R-WI)
Multilateral International Development, Multilateral Institutions, and International Economic, Energy and Environmental Policy	Chris Coons (D-DE)	Rob Portman (R-OH)
Near East, South Asia, Central Asia, and Counterterrorism	Chris Murphy (D-CT)	Todd Young (R-IN)
State Department and USAID Management, International Operations, and Bilateral International Development	Ben Cardin (D-MD)	Bill Hagerty (R-TN)
Western Hemisphere, Transnational Crime, Civilian Security, Democracy, Human Rights and Global Women's Issues	Tim Kaine (D-VA)	Marco Rubio (R-FL)

=== 116th Congress ===
Majority	Minority
Jim Risch, Idaho, Chair; Marco Rubio, Florida; Ron Johnson, Wisconsin; Cory Gardner, Colorado; Todd Young, Indiana; John Barrasso, Wyoming; Rob Portman, Ohio; Rand Paul, Kentucky; Lindsey Graham, South Carolina; Mitt Romney, Utah; Ted Cruz, Texas; David Perdue, Georgia	Bob Menendez, New Jersey, Ranking Member; Ben Cardin, Maryland; Jeanne Shaheen, New Hampshire; Chris Coons, Delaware; Tom Udall, New Mexico; Chris Murphy, Connecticut; Tim Kaine, Virginia; Ed Markey, Massachusetts; Jeff Merkley, Oregon; Cory Booker, New Jersey

Subcommittees	Chair	Ranking Member
Africa and Global Health Policy	Lindsey Graham (R-SC)	Tim Kaine (D-VA)
East Asia, The Pacific, and International Cybersecurity Policy	Cory Gardner (R-CO)	Ed Markey (D-MA)
Europe and Regional Security Cooperation	Ron Johnson (R-WI)	Jeanne Shaheen (D-NH)
Near East, South Asia, Central Asia, and Counterterrorism	Mitt Romney (R-UT)	Chris Murphy (D-CT)
Multilateral International Development, Multilateral Institutions, and International Economic, Energy and Environmental Policy	Todd Young (R-IN)	Jeff Merkley (D-OR)
State Department and USAID Management, International Operations, and Bilateral International Development	John Barrasso (R-WY)	Cory Booker (D-NJ)
Western Hemisphere, Transnational Crime, Civilian Security, Democracy, Human Rights and Global Women's Issues	Marco Rubio (R-FL)	Ben Cardin (D-MD)

=== 115th Congress ===
Majority	Minority
Bob Corker, Tennessee, Chair; Jim Risch, Idaho; Marco Rubio, Florida; Ron Johnson, Wisconsin; Jeff Flake, Arizona; Cory Gardner, Colorado; Todd Young, Indiana; John Barrasso, Wyoming; Johnny Isakson, Georgia; Rob Portman, Ohio; Rand Paul, Kentucky	Bob Menendez, New Jersey, Ranking Member; Ben Cardin, Maryland; Jeanne Shaheen, New Hampshire; Chris Coons, Delaware; Tom Udall, New Mexico; Chris Murphy, Connecticut; Tim Kaine, Virginia; Ed Markey, Massachusetts; Jeff Merkley, Oregon; Cory Booker, New Jersey

Subcommittees	Chair	Ranking Member
Near East, South Asia, Central Asia, and Counterterrorism	Jim Risch (R-ID)	Tim Kaine (D-VA)
Western Hemisphere, Transnational Crime, Civilian Security, Democracy, Human Rights and Global Women's Issues	Marco Rubio (R-FL)	Ben Cardin (D-MD) since February 6, 2018; Bob Menendez (D-NJ) until February 6, 2018
Europe and Regional Security Cooperation	Ron Johnson (R-WI)	Chris Murphy (D-CT)
Africa and Global Health Policy	Jeff Flake (R-AZ)	Cory Booker (D-NJ)
East Asia, The Pacific, and International Cybersecurity Policy	Cory Gardner (R-CO)	Ed Markey (D-MA)
Multilateral International Development, Multilateral Institutions, and International Economic, Energy and Environmental Policy	Todd Young (R-IN)	Jeff Merkley (D-OR)
State Department and USAID Management, International Operations, and Bilateral International Development	Johnny Isakson (R-GA)	Jeanne Shaheen (D-NH)

=== 114th Congress ===
Majority	Minority
Bob Corker, Tennessee Chair; Jim Risch, Idaho; Marco Rubio, Florida; Ron Johnson, Wisconsin; Jeff Flake, Arizona; Cory Gardner, Colorado; David Perdue, Georgia; Johnny Isakson, Georgia; Rand Paul, Kentucky; Rob Portman, Ohio; John Barrasso, Wyoming	Ben Cardin, Maryland, Ranking Member; Barbara Boxer, California; Jeanne Shaheen, New Hampshire; Chris Coons, Delaware; Tom Udall, New Mexico; Bob Menendez, New Jersey; Chris Murphy, Connecticut; Tim Kaine, Virginia; Ed Markey, Massachusetts; Jeff Merkley, Oregon

Sources: 2015 Congressional Record, Vol. 161, Page S297 –297, 661–662

Subcommittee	Chair	Ranking Member
Near East, South Asia, Central Asia and Counterterrorism	Jim Risch (R-Idaho)	Chris Murphy (D-Conn.)
Western Hemisphere, Transnational Crime, Civilian Security, Democracy, Human Rights and Global Women's Issues	Marco Rubio (R-Fla.)	Barbara Boxer (D-Calif.)
Europe and Regional Security Cooperation	Ron Johnson (R-Wisc.)	Jeanne Shaheen (D-N.H.)
Africa and Global Health Policy	Jeff Flake (R-Ariz.)	Ed Markey (D-Mass.)
State Department and USAID Management, International Operations and Bilateral International Development	Rand Paul (R-Ky.)	Barbara Boxer (D-Calif.)
East Asia, The Pacific and International Cybersecurity Policy	Cory Gardner (R-Colo.)	Ben Cardin (D-Md.)
International Development, Multilateral Institutions and International Economic, Energy and Environmental Policy	John Barrasso (R-Wyo.)	Tom Udall (D-N.M.)

=== 113th Congress ===
Majority	Minority
John Kerry, Massachusetts, Chair, until February 1, 2013; Bob Menendez, New Jersey Chair, from February 1, 2013; Barbara Boxer, California; Ben Cardin, Maryland; Jeanne Shaheen, New Hampshire; Chris Coons, Delaware; Bob Casey, Pennsylvania, until 2013; Dick Durbin, Illinois; Tom Udall, New Mexico; Chris Murphy, Connecticut; Tim Kaine, Virginia; Ed Markey, Massachusetts, from 2013	Bob Corker, Tennessee Ranking Member; Jim Risch, Idaho; Marco Rubio, Florida; Ron Johnson, Wisconsin; Jeff Flake, Arizona; John McCain, Arizona; John Barrasso, Wyoming; Rand Paul, Kentucky

Sources: 2013 Congressional Record, Vol. 159, Page S297 –297, 661–662

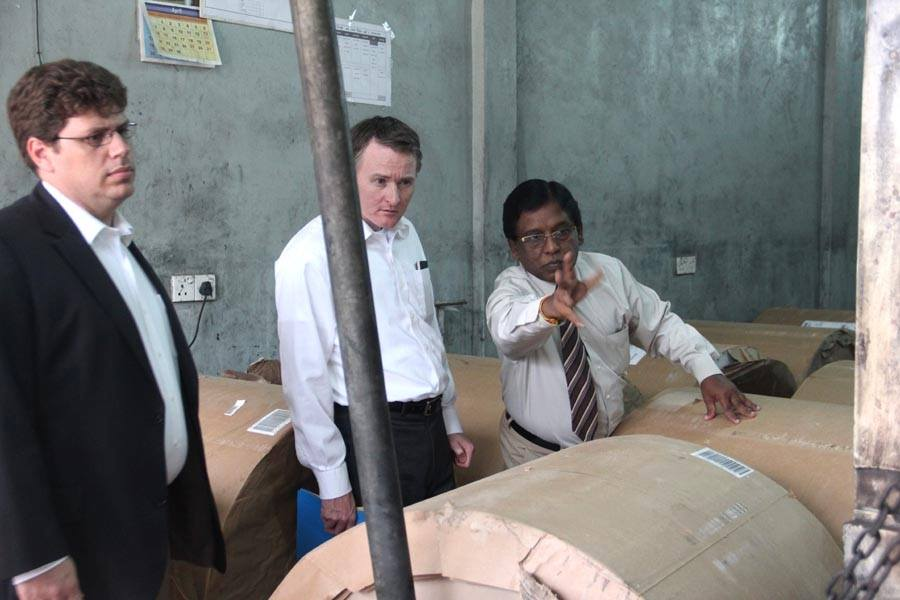
Officials from the US Senate Foreign Relations Committee inspecting burnt down printing press of Uthayan newspaper in Jaffna on December 7, 2013, while E. Saravanapavan, the managing director of the newspaper explaining something to him

Subcommittee	Chair	Ranking Member
International Operations and Organizations, Human Rights, Democracy and Global Women's Issues	Barbara Boxer (D-CA)	Rand Paul (R-KY)
East Asian and Pacific Affairs	Ben Cardin (D-MD)	Marco Rubio (R-FL)
African Affairs	Chris Coons (D-DE)	Jeff Flake (R-AZ)
Western Hemisphere and Global Narcotics Affairs	Tom Udall (D-NM)	John McCain (R-AZ)
European Affairs	Chris Murphy (D-CT)	Ron Johnson (R-WI)
Near Eastern and South and Central Asian Affairs	Tim Kaine (D-VA)	Jim Risch (R-ID)
International Development and Foreign Assistance, Economic Affairs and International Environmental Protection, and Peace Corps	Tim Kaine (D-VA), until 2013; Ed Markey (D-MA), from 2013	John Barrasso (R-WY)

== See also ==
- List of United States Senate committees
- Bureau of Legislative Affairs
