= Bill Hagerty =

American politician and diplomat (born 1959)

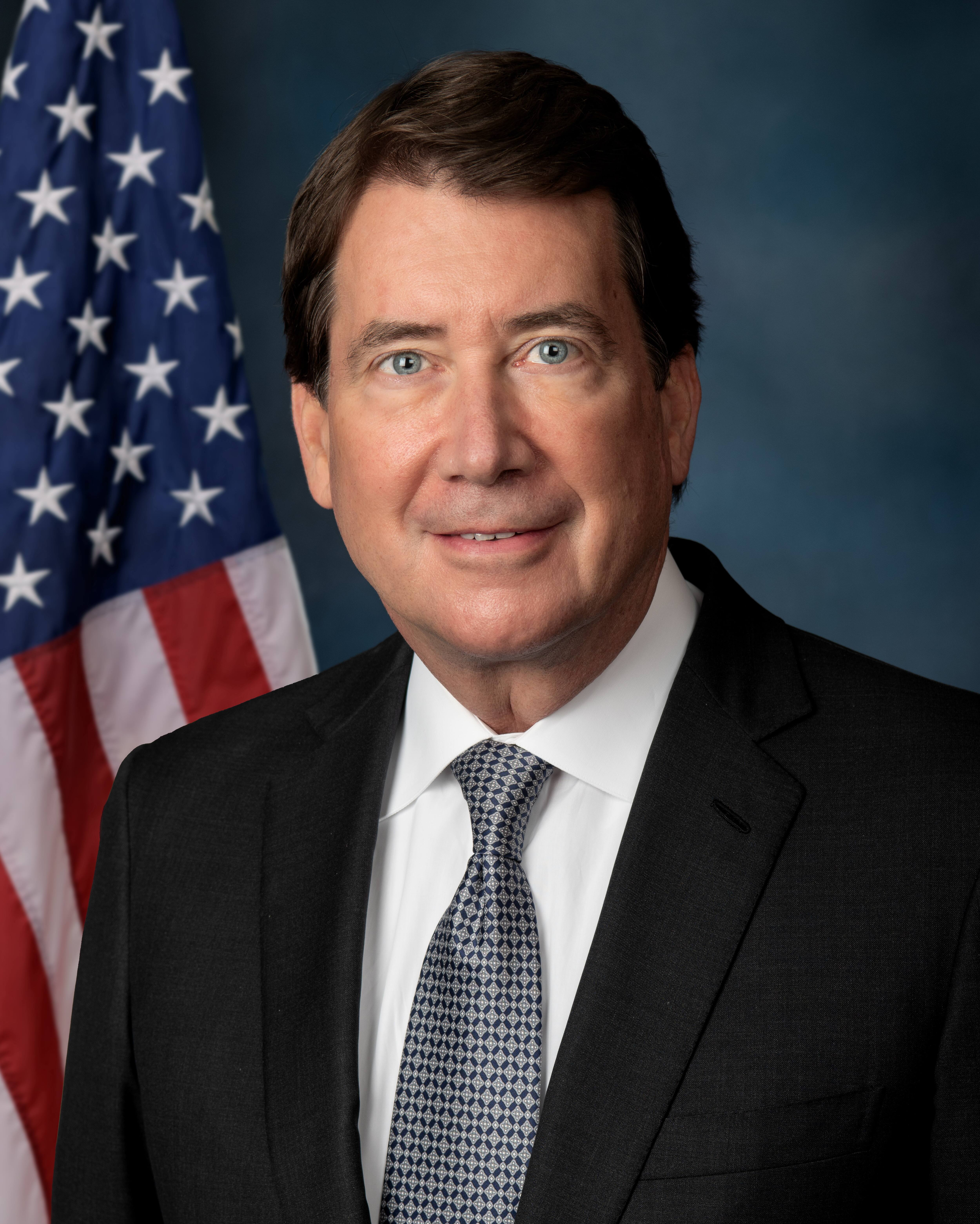
- Official portrait, 2021

United States Senator from Tennessee
- Incumbent
- Assumed office January 3, 2021 Serving with Marsha Blackburn
- Preceded by: Lamar Alexander

30th United States Ambassador to Japan
- In office August 31, 2017 – July 22, 2019
- President: Donald Trump
- Preceded by: Caroline Kennedy
- Succeeded by: Rahm Emanuel (2022)

Tennessee Commissioner of Economic and Community Development
- In office February 14, 2011 – June 6, 2014
- Governor: Bill Haslam
- Preceded by: Matt Kisber
- Succeeded by: Randy Boyd

Personal details
- Born: William Francis Hagerty IV; August 14, 1959 (age 67) Gallatin, Tennessee, U.S.
- Party: Republican
- Spouse: Chrissy Hagerty (m. 2001)
- Children: 4
- Education: Vanderbilt University (BA, JD)
- Website: Senate Website; Campaign website
- Hagerty's voice Hagerty questions witnesses on China and on fentanyl overdoses in the U.S. Recorded February 15, 2023

William Francis Hagerty IV (/ˈhæɡərti/ HAG-ər-tee; born August 14, 1959) is an American politician, businessman, and diplomat serving as the junior United States senator from Tennessee since 2021. A member of the Republican Party, he served as the 30th United States ambassador to Japan from 2017 to 2019 under President Donald Trump.

Hagerty began his career in private equity. Hagerty is the co-founder of Hagerty Peterson & Company, a private equity investment firm; he is a former managing director of the firm. From 2011 to 2014, Hagerty served as commissioner of the Tennessee Department of Economic and Community Development. He led a successful effort to bring a Major League Soccer franchise to Nashville. President Trump nominated Hagerty to serve as U.S. ambassador to Japan on March 27, 2017; the U.S. Senate confirmed him on July 13 in an 86–12 vote. Hagerty was sworn in as the 30th United States ambassador to Japan on July 27, 2017. He resigned in July 2019 to run for the U.S. Senate.

Hagerty ran in the 2020 election for the U.S. Senate seat being vacated by Lamar Alexander. He won the Republican primary and defeated Democratic nominee Marquita Bradshaw in the general election. He was reelected again in 2026. Hagerty is expected to become Tennessee's senior US senator when Marsha Blackburn resigns to take office as Governor of Tennessee.

== Early life and education ==
Hagerty is a native of Gallatin, in Sumner County, Tennessee. He became an Eagle Scout, and was awarded the Distinguished Eagle Scout Award in 2017. He is a 1977 graduate of Madisonville North Hopkins High School in Kentucky. He earned a Bachelor of Arts in economics and business administration from Vanderbilt University in 1981. He received a Juris Doctor from Vanderbilt Law School in 1984.

== Career ==
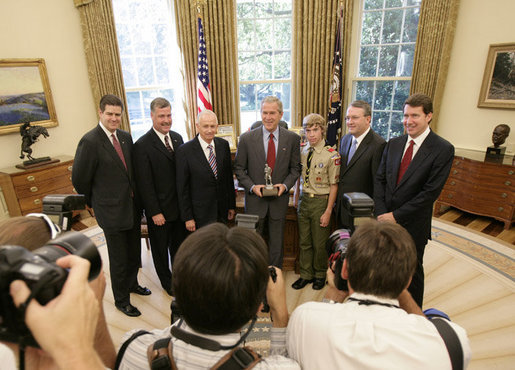
Hagerty (right) and members of the National Capital Area Council of the Boy Scouts of America with President George W. Bush in 2006

Hagerty began his career at Boston Consulting Group, culminating in a three-year assignment to Tokyo. He was an economic advisor and White House Fellow in the administration of President George H. W. Bush and then began a career in private equity, initially at Trident Capital in Silicon Valley. Hagerty is the co-founder of Hagerty Peterson & Company, a private equity investment firm; he is a former managing director of the firm. He served as a national finance chair for Mitt Romney's 2008 presidential campaign.

From 2011 to 2014, Hagerty served as commissioner of the Tennessee Department of Economic and Community Development in the cabinet of Governor Bill Haslam, where he played a role in investments by Bridgestone, Calsonic Kansei (now Magneti Marelli), and Nissan in Tennessee.

Hagerty has served on the board of CyMed, NEW Customer Services, Houghton Mifflin Harcourt, Ryman Hospitality, Pinnacle Financial Partners, and R.J. O'Brien.

=== Nashville MLS Steering Committee ===
Before his confirmation as U.S. Ambassador to Japan, Hagerty founded and led the Nashville MLS Steering Committee, a coalition seeking to bring a Major League Soccer franchise to Nashville, Tennessee. The effort was successful, with Nashville being officially selected and named the first of two new MLS expansion markets on December 20, 2017. Nashville SC debuted in the 2020 MLS season.

=== 2016 presidential election ===
During the early stages of the 2016 presidential election, Hagerty was nominated to serve on the ballot as a delegate for Jeb Bush. Bush dropped out of the race before the Tennessee primary on March 1, 2016. After the Tennessee primary, Hagerty served as Trump Victory Chair for Tennessee. After Trump became the Republican nominee, Hagerty was selected in August 2016 as director of appointments for Trump's first presidential transition team.

=== United States Ambassador to Japan ===
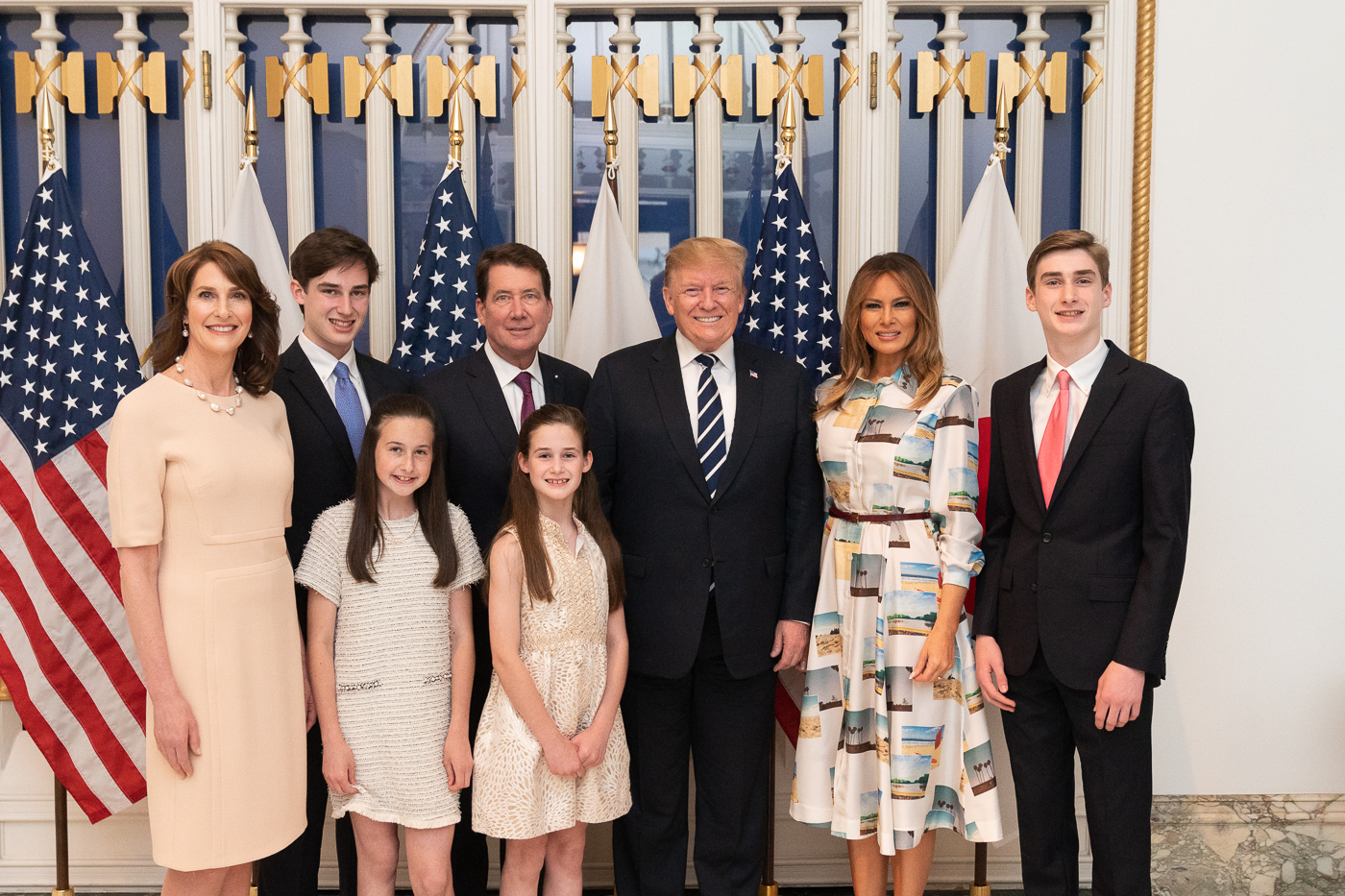
Hagerty and family with Donald and Melania Trump in the ambassadorial residence in 2019

Trump nominated Hagerty to be the United States Ambassador to Japan on March 27, 2017. Hagerty was confirmed by the Senate on July 13, 2017, in an 86–12 vote. He was sworn in on July 27, 2017.

Before his confirmation, Hagerty was reportedly also under consideration for United States Trade Representative, based on his prior international trade and U.S. foreign investment experience. The job eventually went to Robert Lighthizer, an attorney and former Reagan Administration official.

On July 16, 2019, Hagerty announced that he would resign as Ambassador to Japan to run for the Senate.

== U.S. Senate ==
=== 2020 ===
Final results by county in 2020: Bill Hagerty: 80–90%; 70–80%; 60–70%; 50–60%; Marquita Bradshaw: 60–70%; 50–60%

In December 2018, U.S. senator Lamar Alexander announced that he would not run for a fourth term. When asked about possible successors, Alexander named Hagerty and former governor Bill Haslam as the "most obvious" candidates. On July 11, 2019, Haslam announced that he would not run for the Senate. The next day, Trump tweeted that Hagerty would resign as ambassador to Japan to run for the open Senate seat. In the same tweet, Trump endorsed Hagerty for Senate. Hagerty was mentioned as a potential U.S. secretary of state during the same period.

Hagerty officially launched his Senate campaign in September 2019. By the end of the month, he had raised $1.9 million for his campaign. By April 6, Hagerty had raised more than $7 million, with $1.2 million raised in the first quarter of 2020. Speakers at Hagerty campaign fundraisers included Donald Trump Jr., Kimberly Guilfoyle, and Nikki Haley.

Beginning in late May 2020, news outlets began circulating an article, originally published by Roger Sollenberger in Salon, discussing allegations of campaign finance misconduct by Hagerty. The article focused largely on a loan given to the Hagerty Campaign by Pinnacle Financial Partners almost immediately following the Coronavirus Aid, Relief and Economic Security Act.

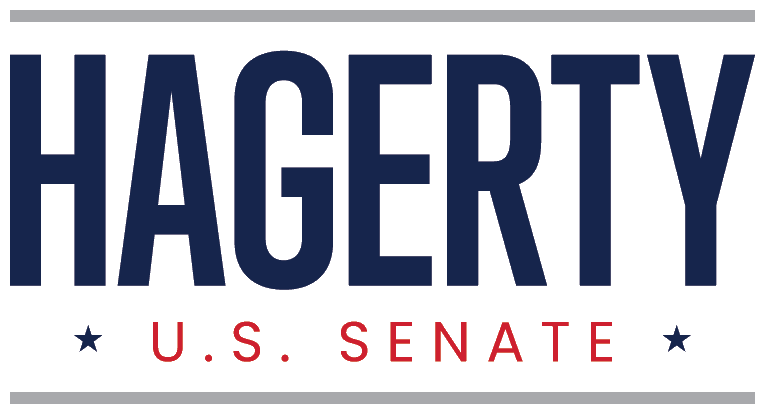
Hagerty's congressional campaign logo, used during the 2020 election

On August 6, 2020, Hagerty won the Republican primary. He defeated Democratic nominee Marquita Bradshaw in the November general election, 1,840,926 votes to 1,040,691. Hagerty took office on January 3, 2021.

=== Tenure ===
Hagerty initially planned to object to certifying the 2021 United States Electoral College vote count over unsubstantiated claims of voter fraud. But after Trump supporters stormed the U.S. Capitol, he changed his mind and voted to certify the count. On May 28, 2021, Hagerty voted against creating an independent commission to investigate the Capitol attack.

In August 2021, Hagerty used a procedural maneuver to grind the final vote on the $1 trillion Infrastructure Investment and Jobs Act to a halt, citing the expense and the upcoming $3.5 trillion reconciliation bill. His actions drew the ire of both Democratic and Republican senators, with Democrats accusing Hagerty of doing Trump's bidding and Republicans such as Mitt Romney and Kevin Cramer showing frustration.

In July 2022, Business Insider reported that Hagerty had violated the Stop Trading on Congressional Knowledge (STOCK) Act of 2012, a federal transparency and conflict-of-interest law, by failing to disclose on time sales of stock from his three of his dependent children's trusts.

In October 2024, it was reported that Hagerty was being considered for a Cabinet position, either Treasury, Commerce, or State. After Trump won, reports singled out Treasury as the most likely spot for Hagerty. Ultimately, Hagerty remained in the Senate.

On July 18, 2025, President Trump signed into law the GENIUS Act, legislation Hagerty drafted and championed. It is the first major federal cryptocurrency law and creates a regulatory framework for stablecoins.

In August 2026, Hagerty introduced the Blocking Large-scale Adversarial Distillation Efforts Act, S. 5252, with Tim Scott, Andy Kim and Catherine Cortez Masto. It would direct the Commerce Department to add foreign entities found to have carried out distillation attacks on American AI models to the Entity List.

==== Committees ====
- Committee on Banking, Housing, and Urban Affairs
- Committee on Foreign Relations
- Committee on Appropriations
- Committee on Rules and Administration

== Political positions ==
Hagerty is a self-described conservative. His views have been characterized as populist and in line with Trump's political views.

During his 2020 Senate campaign, Hagerty resigned from the board of futures brokerage R.J. O'Brien & Associates after an opponent claimed the firm was donating money to the Black Lives Matter Foundation, an organization of which Hagerty is critical. He was also called "entitled" for acquiring a $2.5 million loan to his campaign from Pinnacle Bank (where he had formerly been a director) at a time when small businesses were having difficulty getting federal stimulus loans during the COVID-19 pandemic.

Hagerty supports the death penalty for people convicted of engaging in human trafficking acts. He believes that Sharia Law is a national security threat to the U.S. and that the U.S. should continue to support Israel. Hagerty supports reducing taxes and supports enacting a balanced budget amendment to the Constitution of the United States. He opposes raising the federal minimum wage. Hagerty opposes the Patient Protection and Affordable Care Act, and believes that the federal government should reduce its involvement in health care. He supports efforts to prevent the closure of rural hospitals. Hagerty supports increased investment and development of fossil fuels, and supports repealing renewable energy and energy efficiency standards. He also supports American energy independence.

Hagerty strongly supports the United States–Mexico–Canada Agreement. In 2025, after the Mexican government seized a deep-water port owned by Vulcan Materials Company, he and senator Katie Britt reintroduced the Defending American Property Abroad Act, which would "impose retaliatory prohibitions to deter and punish any nation in the Western Hemisphere that unlawfully seizes American assets". This legislation expands the powers of the Department of Homeland Security and Office of the United States Trade Representative to investigate and prohibit vessels from entering a U.S. port and respond to foreign governments that deny U.S. companies fair and equal treatment.

== Personal life ==
Hagerty is married to Chrissy Hagerty, and has four children. He is an Episcopalian and identifies as a conservative Christian.

== Electoral history ==
2020 United States Senate Republican primary results
Party	Candidate	Votes	%
Republican	Bill Hagerty	331,267	50.75%
Republican	Manny Sethi	257,223	39.41%
Republican	George Flinn, Jr.	22,454	3.44%
Republican	Jon Henry	8,104	1.24%
Republican	Natisha Brooks	8,072	1.24%
Republican	Byron Bush	5,420	0.83%
Republican	Clifford Adkins	5,316	0.81%
Republican	Terry Dicus	2,279	0.35%
Republican	Tom Emerson, Jr.	2,252	0.35%
Republican	David Schuster	2,045	0.31%
Republican	John Osborne	1,877	0.29%
Republican	Roy Dale Cope	1,791	0.27%
Republican	Kent Morrell	1,769	0.27%
Republican	Aaron Pettigrew	1,622	0.25%
Republican	Glen Neal, Jr.	1,233	0.19%
Total votes		652,724	100.00%

2020 United States Senate election in Tennessee
Party	Candidate	Votes	%	±%
Republican	Bill Hagerty	1,840,926	62.20%	+0.33%
Democratic	Marquita Bradshaw	1,040,691	35.16%	+3.29%
Independent	Elizabeth McLeod	16,652	0.56%	N/A
Independent	Yomi Faparusi	10,727	0.36%	N/A
Independent	Stephen Hooper	9,609	0.32%	N/A
Independent	Kacey Morgan (withdrawn)	9,598	0.32%	N/A
Independent	Ronnie Henley	8,478	0.30%	N/A
Independent	Aaron James	7,203	0.29%	N/A
Independent	Eric William Stansberry	6,781	0.23%	N/A
Independent	Dean Hill	4,872	0.16%	N/A
Independent	Jeffrey Grunau	4,160	0.14%	N/A
Write-in		64	0.00%	±0.00%
Total votes		2,959,761	100.00%	
Republican hold				

== Honors ==
- Grand Cordon of the Order of the Rising Sun (2025)

Diplomatic posts
Preceded by Caroline Kennedy	United States Ambassador to Japan; 2017–2019	Succeeded by Joseph Young; Acting
Party political offices
Preceded by Lamar Alexander	Republican nominee for U.S. Senator from Tennessee (Class 2); 2020, 2026	Most recent
U.S. Senate
Preceded by Lamar Alexander	U.S. Senator (Class 2) from Tennessee; 2021–present Served alongside: Marsha Blackburn	Incumbent
U.S. order of precedence (ceremonial)
Preceded by Mark Kelly	Order of precedence of the United States as United States Senator	Succeeded by Tommy Tuberville
Preceded by John Hickenlooper	United States senators by seniority 74th	Succeeded by Tommy Tuberville
