= List of American politicians with religious occupations =

This is a list of politicians of the United States who were employed in a religious occupation before, during, or after their political service. The First Amendment of the United States Constitution, ratified 1791, prohibits the government of the United States from passing any law "respecting an establishment of religion or prohibiting the free exercise thereof." This "deregulation" of religious practice, combined with "social and ethnic diversity of the settlers," and the progressive advancement of the frontier "gave all sects room to survive. If banished from one settlement, religious sects could soon pros per in another. Finally, in all colonies, the vast majority of the population was not actively participating in any church. Irreligion as well as dissenting religions had to be tolerated." Religion and politics, then, are decoupled on the national government level but the influence of religious leaders on local electorates has resulted in many men employed in faith work being elected to public office in the United States.

Most of the Representatives and Senators who had religious occupations have been Protestants, representing an array of denominations. In 1980, Pope John Paul II reinforced an existing but lightly enforced canon law that priests should not hold public-trust political civil offices. Robert Drinan of Massachusetts, a Jesuit and ordained priest, thus did not seek reelection for another term. Drinan was the last of four Roman Catholic priests who have served in Congress, the first being Eligius Fromentin of Louisiana, the second being missionary Gabriel Richard, non-voting delegate of Michigan Territory, and the third being Robert Cornell of Wisconsin, a brother of the Premonstratensian order whose memoir was entitled Is There Is a Priest in the House?

Mitt Romney (Utah) was a bishop of the LDS Church, meaning a "lay leader who oversees a local congregation."

== Senate ==
- Parson Brownlow (Tennessee), Methodist circuit preacher before going into journalism and politics
- Walter T. Colquitt (Georgia), licensed Methodist pastor
- John Danforth (Missouri), Yale Divinity School, ordained Episcopal clergy
- Edward Everett (Massachusetts), pastor of the Brattle Street Unitarian Church in Boston
- Eligius Fromentin (Louisiana), ordained Catholic priest "exercised his ministry at Etampes, France; fled from France during the Reign of Terror"
- David L. Morril (New Hampshire), pastor of the Presbyterian Church of Goffstown nine years
- John Peter Gabriel Muhlenberg (Pennsylvania), ordained in 1768, "pastor of Lutheran churches in New Germantown and Bedminster, New Jersey," later converted to Anglicanism
- Hiram R. Revels (Mississippi), Beech Grove Quaker Seminary, Darke County Seminary, ordained African Methodist Episcopal Church minister at Baltimore
- Thomas W. Tipton (Nebraska), ordained Methodist Episcopal minister, later converted to Congregationalism
- Raphael Warnock (Georgia), senior pastor at Ebenzer Baptist Church in Atlanta
- Paine Wingate (New Hampshire), pastor of Hampton Falls Congregational Church 13 years

== House of Representatives ==
- Samuel C. Allen (Massachusetts), studied theology, pastor Northfield Congregational Church three years
- John Bacon (Massachusetts), studied theology, minister of Old South Church four years until "dismissed...owing to differences of opinion"
- David Bard (Pennsylvania), ordained Presbyterian minister and missionary
- Joseph Barker (Massachusetts), minister of First Congregational Church of Middleboro
- Robert Baylor (Alabama), agnostic converted Baptist at a revival meeting, became a leader of the Baptist community in Texas
- Benjamin Bennet (New Jersey), pastor Baptist church in Middletown
- Herbert S. Bigelow (Ohio), ordained Congregational minister
- John Brodhead (New Hampshire), theology student, minister 44 years
- Joseph Burrows (Missouri), "ordained as a minister in Cainsville"
- Merwin Coad (Iowa), ordained Disciples of Christ
- Oliver C. Comstock (New York), pastor of First Baptist Church, Rochester, New York
- Benjamin Contee (Maryland), pastor of Port Tobacco Episcopal Church
- Robert John Cornell (Wisconsin), ordained a Roman Catholic priest, Norbertine Order
- Josiah Crudup (North Carolina), Baptist minister before and after term in Congress
- Jabez L. M. Curry (Alabama), became a Baptist preacher after the American Civil War
- Manasseh Cutler (Massachusetts), studied theology, "ordained to the ministry by the Congregational Society at Hamilton"
- Robert Drinan (Massachusetts), Jesuit brother and Roman Catholic priest, "lecturer on church–state relations" at Andover Newton Theological Seminary
- Bob Edgar (Pennsylvania), Master of Divinity, ordained United Methodist minister
- Samuel Clement Fessenden (Maine), Bangor Theological Seminary, pastor of Second Congregational Church in Thomaston
- Albert P. Forsythe (Illinois), Methodist circuit preacher
- Abiel Foster (New Hampshire), pastor at Canterbury, New Hampshire, 16 years
- Patrick Gaines Goode (Ohio), Methodist Episcopal minister
- Josiah Grinnell (Iowa), Auburn Theological Seminary, Presbyterian and Episcopal pastorates in several cities
- Tennyson Guyer (Ohio), "ordained minister of the Churches of God of North America and a pastor and overseer"
- Robert Bernard Hall (Massachusetts), Yale Divinity School, ordained minister and rector
- Henry W. Hilliard (Alabama), Methodist preacher
- Nathan Thomas Hopkins (Kentucky), Baptist minister 50 years
- William H. Hudnut III (Indiana), Union Theological Seminary, ordained
- Charles Hudson (Massachusetts), ordained Universalist minister, "author of religious textbooks and sacred memoirs"
- John Jameson (Missouri), "ordained as a minister in the Christian Church"
- Glancy Jones (Pennsylvania), Episcopal minister 1835–1841
- John Kerr (Virginia), originally Presbyterian, converted to Baptism and was a missionary minister after his term in Congress
- Ole Juulson Kvale (Minnesota), Luther Theological Seminary (Minneapolis), Lutheran minister almost 30 years until elected to Congress
- Posey Green Lester (Virginia), "entered the Primitive Baptist ministry at age 25"
- Ron Lewis (Kentucky), minister of White Mills Baptist Church
- Owen Lovejoy (Illinois), pastor of the Congregational Church in Princeton, Illinois, 16 years
- Charles Henry Martin (North Carolina), Southern Baptist Theological Seminary, ordained
- Luther McKinney (New Hampshire), Universalist pastor
- James Meacham (Vermont), Andover Theological Seminary, Congregationalist minister
- Jacob Meeker (Missouri), graduate Oberlin Theological Seminary, Congregational minister
- James Milnor (Pennsylvania), Protestant Episcopal Church, minister and rector at churches in Philadelphia and New York City
- Jesse Hale Moore (Illinois), Methodist minister and presiding elder
- Frederick Augustus Conrad Muhlenberg (Pennsylvania), ordained Lutheran minister, congregations in Stouchsburg and Lebanon
- Amos Myers (Pennsylvania), "ordained to the Baptist ministry, and preached in Kentucky, Pennsylvania, and New York" after term in Congress
- Samuel P. Morrill (Maine), theology student and minister before and after service in Congress
- John Jamison Pearce (Pennsylvania), Baltimore Conference, pastor for several Methodist Episcopal congregations
- Jared Perkins (New Hampshire), minister for 30 years
- William A. Pile (Missouri), Methodist Episcopal minister
- Adam Clayton Powell Jr. (New York), pastor Abyssinian Baptist in Harlem
- Henry Otis Pratt (Iowa), Methodist Episcopal Church minister 41 years
- Gabriel Richard (Michigan Territory), "studied theology in the seminary of Augers, France, and in Paris," ordained Roman Catholic priest and missionary
- Joseph Richardson (Massachusetts), minister of the Unitarian Church at Hingham
- Alvah Sabin (Vermont), many Baptist ministries over many decades including 40 years at Georgia Baptist Church in Georgia, Vermont
- Julius Seelye (Massachusetts), Auburn Theological Seminary, studied theology in Halle, Germany, pastor of First Dutch Reform Church in Schenectady five years
- Green Clay Smith (Kentucky), pastor of the Metropolitan Baptist Church in Washington, D.C. five years
- Henry E. Stubbs (California), Christian Church clergyman 12 years
- Samuel Taggart (Massachusetts), minister of Colrain Presbyterian Church
- William P. Taulbee (Kentucky), "ordained for the ministry and admitted to the Kentucky conference of the Methodist Episcopal Church South"
- Mark Trafton (Massachusetts), theology student and minister before and after term in Congress
- Charles Upham (Massachusetts), theological department of Harvard University, ordained minister in Salem
- William D. Upshaw (Georgia), evangelist, faculty and vice president of the Linda Vista Baptist Bible College and Seminary in California, ordained Baptist minister at age 72
- Marshall Wellborn (Georgia), Baptist minister 10 years
- George Willard (Michigan), studied theology, Episcopal minister and rector
- Andrew Young (Georgia), Hartford Theological Seminary, United Church of Christ pastorates in Alabama and Georgia

== See also ==
- Catholic priests in public office
- Catholic Church in the United States
- List of Christian clergy in politics
- Separation of church and state in the United States
- Establishment Clause
- Lists of members of Congress by religious affiliation:
  - List of Buddhist members of the United States Congress
  - List of Hindu members of the United States Congress
  - List of Jewish members of the United States Congress
  - List of Mormon members of the United States Congress
  - List of Muslim members of the United States Congress
  - List of Quaker members of the United States Congress
