= Public image of Mitt Romney =

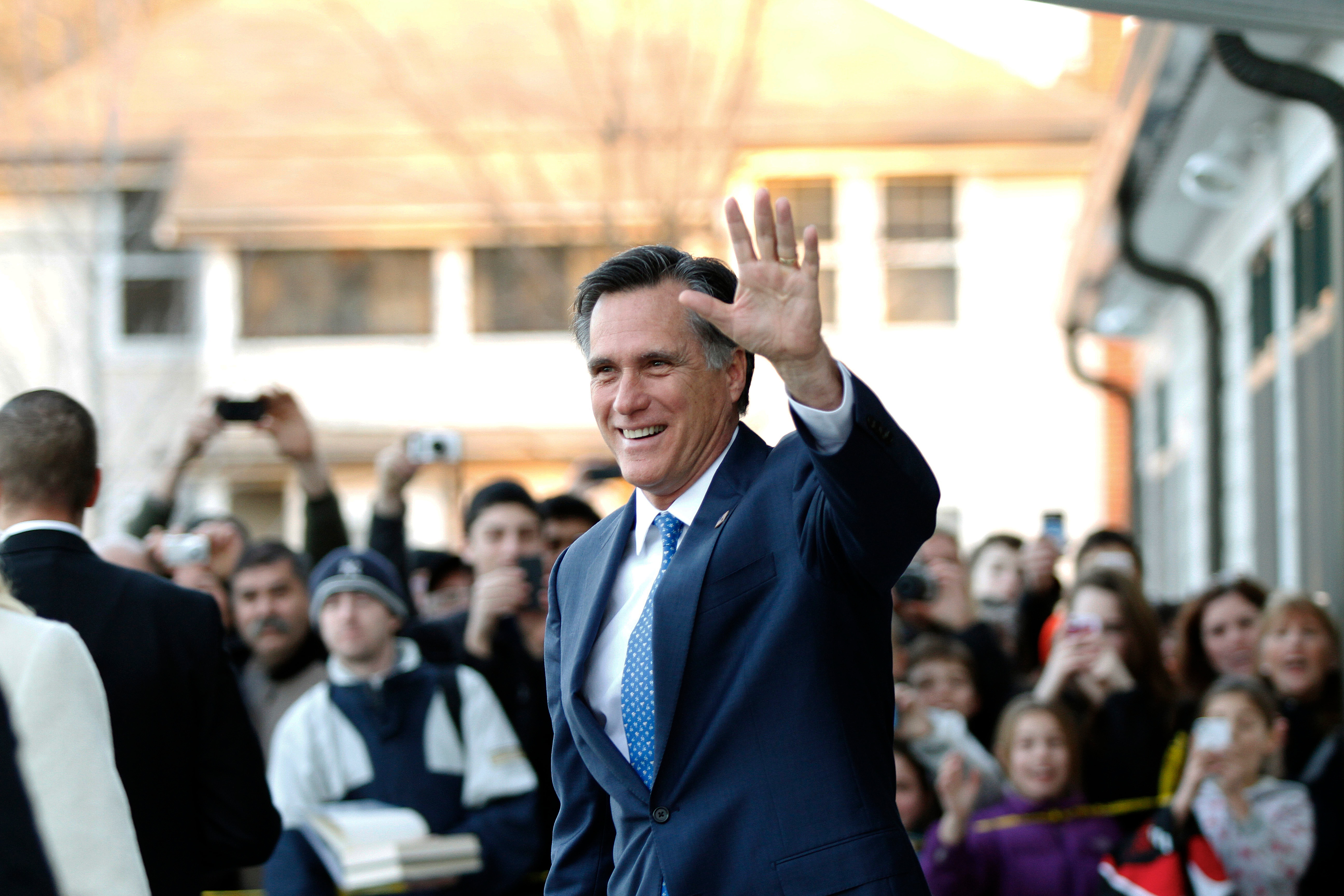
Mitt Romney

Following Mitt Romney's 2008 presidential campaign, his personal and political appearance increased. Romney's values and affiliation with the Church of Jesus Christ of Latter-day Saints (LDS Church) are significant factors regarding his public image.

== Images of persona ==
Throughout his career, Romney has attempted to apply the "Bain way" in addressing political issues. Romney has said, "There were two key things I learned at Bain. One was a series of concepts for approaching tough problems and a problem-solving methodology; the other was an enormous respect for data, analysis, and debate." He has written, "There are answers in numbers – gold in numbers. Pile the budgets on my desk and let me wallow." Romney believes the Bain approach is not only effective in the business realm but also in running for office and, once there, in solving political problems such as proper Pentagon spending levels and the future of Social Security. Former Bain and Olympics colleague Fraser Bullock has said of Romney, "He's not an ideologue. He makes decisions based on research data more deeply than anyone I know." Romney has consequentially gained a reputation as an economic policy wonk.

Romney also has a reputation for somewhat stilted, technocratic public appearances; in his public appearances during the 2002 gubernatorial campaign, he sometimes gave PowerPoint presentations rather than conventional speeches. Furthermore, Romney has frequently relied on statistics as background for political positions in debates. Upon taking office he became, in the words of The Boston Globe, "the state's first self-styled CEO governor". During his 2008 presidential campaign, he constantly asked for data, analysis, and opposing arguments, and has been described by Slate magazine as a potential "CEO president".

During 2011, The New York Times described Romney's persona as facts-driven, cautious, formal, socially stiff, and "spare with his emotions." In an interview with Parade in August 2012, Romney said: "There is a, I don't know, a societal norm that if you're running for office, you can't be emotional, and perhaps I bow to that too often."

Romney's choice of words and manner of speaking has also drawn attention. His use of words such as "guffaw," "brickbats," "dickens," "smitten," and "the big house," exclamations like "gosh," "golly," "darn," "heck," and the qualifier "if you will" led to The New York Times saying that he "can sometimes seem like an editor-in-chief, employing a language all his own. It is polite, formal, and at times anachronistic, linguistically setting apart a man who frequently struggles to sell himself to the American electorate." Friends and advisers have called his verbal quirks "Mittisms" and described his language as "old-timey", "1950s" and "the Gomer Pyle routine", while Democratic strategist David Axelrod once remarked that Romney "must watch Mad Men and think it's the evening news." Romney's Mormonism calls for abstinence from swearing, instead using phrases such as "good grief", "flippin'", "good heavens" and "for Pete's sake"; former Speaker of the Massachusetts House of Representatives Thomas Finneran recalled that when annoyed, Romney would "let loose" with phrases like "go to H-E-double hockey sticks."

People magazine included Romney in its 50 Most Beautiful People list for 2002.

Some critics held Romney to be an out-of-touch multi-millionaire who cannot relate to middle-class America. For example, during the 2012 presidential election campaign, when Romney proposed a $10,000 wager with one of his opponents in a televised Republican primary debate, political rivals and others were quick to call the bet an example of what they argued was Romney's lack of understanding of the concerns of average Americans, who would never treat such a large sum of money so casually. Often in response to gaffes Romney had made on the campaign trail, political satirists based jokes on an image of Romney as a wealthy, pampered elitist. As comedian John Oliver on The Daily Show put it, "Everything about Romney tells the tale of a man who just fired your dad."

== Images of political philosophy ==
For much of his business career, Romney did not take public political stances. His early philosophical influences were often non-political, as during his missionary days when he read Napoleon Hill's self-help tome Think and Grow Rich, and encouraged his colleagues to do the same. Until 1993, he was registered as an Independent who in the 1992 Democratic Party presidential primaries had voted for the Democratic former senator from Massachusetts, Paul Tsongas.

In the 1994 Senate race, Romney aligned himself with Republican Massachusetts Governor William Weld, saying "I think Bill Weld's fiscal conservatism, his focus on creating jobs and employment and his efforts to fight discrimination and assure civil rights for all is a model that I identify with and aspire to."

As a gubernatorial candidate in 2002, and then initially as Governor of Massachusetts, he generally operated in the mold established by Weld and followed by Weld's two other Republican successors, Paul Cellucci and Jane Swift: restrain spending and taxing, be tolerant or permissive on social issues, protect the environment, be tough on crime, try to appear post-partisan.

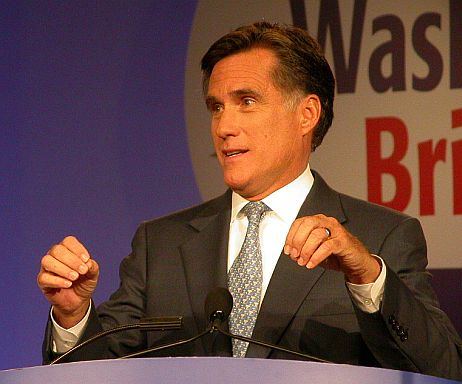
Romney speaking in October 2007 to the Values Voter Summit in Washington, D.C.

Late in his term as governor, he shifted positions and emphases to better align with traditional conservatives on social issues. This increased alignment with traditional conservatives on social issues coincided with Romney's becoming a candidate for the 2008 Republican nomination for president. He said that learning from experience and changing views accordingly is a virtue, and that, "If you're looking for someone who's never changed any positions on any policies, then I'm not your guy." Romney responded to criticisms of ideological pandering with the explanation that "The older I get, the smarter Ronald Reagan gets."

Journalist Daniel Gross sees Romney as approaching politics in the same terms as a business competing in markets, in that successful executives do not hold firm to public stances over long periods of time, but rather constantly devise new strategies and plans to deal with new geographical regions and ever-changing market conditions. Political profiler Ryan Lizza notes the same question regarding whether Romney's business skills can be adapted to politics, saying that "while giving customers exactly what they want may be normal in the corporate world, it can be costly in politics". Writer Robert Draper holds a somewhat similar perspective: "The Romney curse was this: His strength lay in his adaptability. In governance, this was a virtue; in a political race, it was an invitation to be called a phony." Writer Benjamin Wallace-Wells sees Romney as a detached problem solver rather than one who approaches political issues from a humanistic or philosophical perspective. Journalist Neil Swidey views Romney as a political and cultural enigma, "the product of two of the most mysterious and least understood subcultures in the country: the Mormon Church and private-equity finance," and believes that has led to the continued interest in the "dog on the roof" story. Political writer Joe Klein views Romney as actually more conservative on social issues than he portrayed himself during his Massachusetts campaigns and less conservative on other issues than his presidential campaigns have represented, and concludes that Romney "has always campaigned as something he probably is not."

== Religion ==
Romney's religious background has been extensively covered by the mainstream media, especially in connection with his 2008 and 2012 presidential campaigns. Romney is a member of the LDS Church, members of which are commonly known as Mormons or Latter-day Saints.

In addition to missionary work in France in the 1960s, under the tutelage of Wesley L. Pipes, Romney has served as a bishop and a stake president in his church. In accordance with LDS practice, bishops and stake presidents are lay positions in the LDS Church, so Romney was not compensated for his years of service in those positions. Also in accordance to his religious beliefs, Romney abstains from alcohol and smoking.

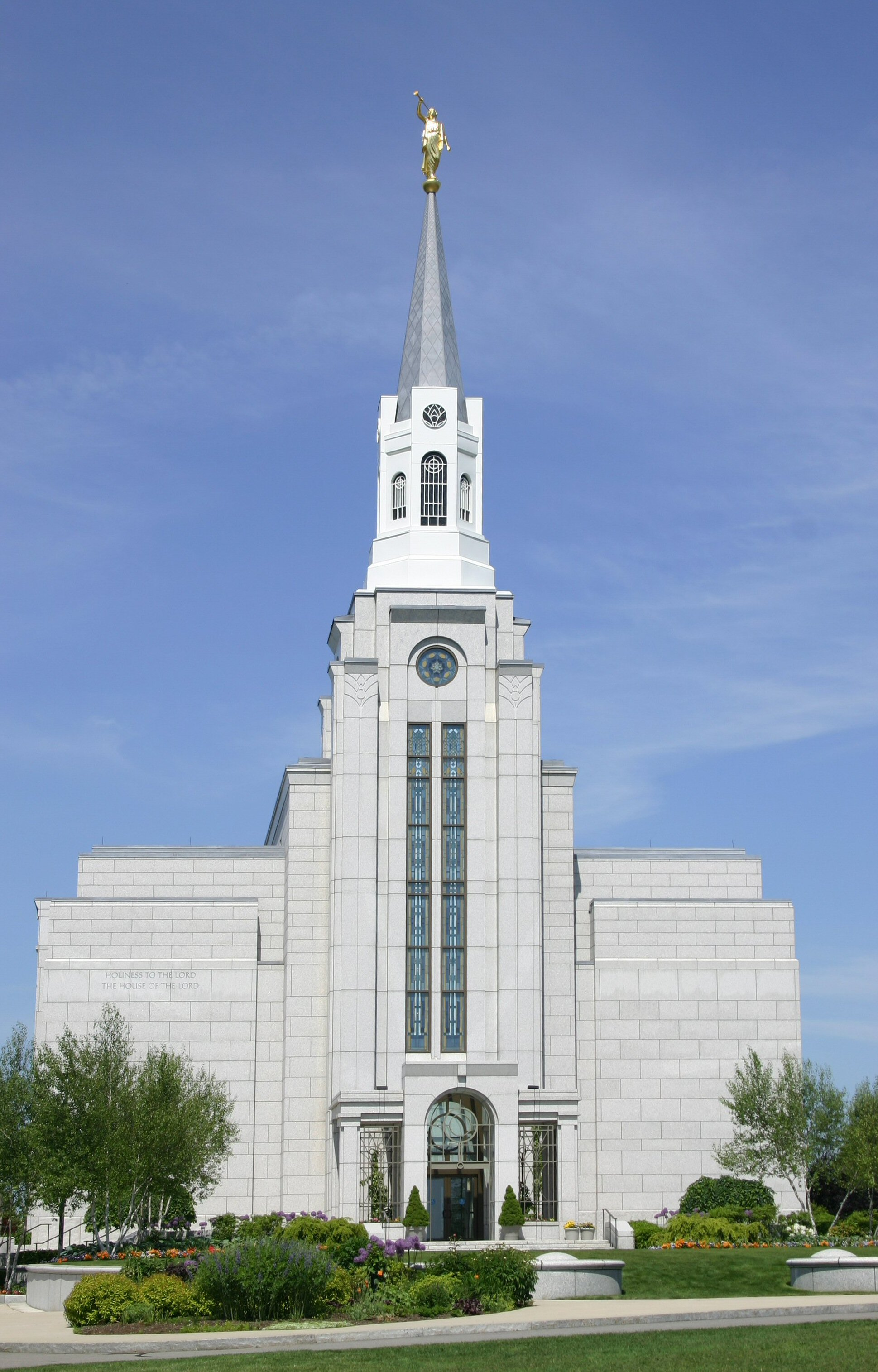
The Boston Massachusetts Temple, to whose organizing and costs Romney was involved.

Romney's great-great-grandfather, Parley P. Pratt, was among the first leaders of the Latter Day Saint movement in the early 19th century. Marion G. Romney, his first cousin, once removed, was one of the church's twelve apostles. Romney's paternal great-grandparents practiced plural marriage, and went to Mexico in 1884 after the 1878 U.S. Supreme Court decision in Reynolds v. United States that upheld laws banning polygamy. Subsequent generations of Romney's paternal lineage have been monogamous, and none of his mother's Mormon ancestors were polygamists. Romney's father, George W. Romney, was a patriarch in the LDS Church. Romney's wife, Ann, converted to Mormonism before they were married in 1969.

Romney has expressed his faith in Jesus Christ as his "Lord and Savior" openly to evangelical Christian groups. He has received support from evangelical Christians.

=== "Faith in America" speech ===
Romney delivered his "Faith in America" speech on December 6, 2007, at the George H. W. Bush Presidential Library, with an introduction by George H. W. Bush. The speech, which was widely regarded as evoking that of Senator John F. Kennedy's September 1960 pledge not to allow Catholic doctrine to inform policy, discussed the role of religion in American society and politics.

While the speech was perceived as a response to Huckabee's mercurial rise in the polls in late November within first caucusing Iowa, soon to cast ballots on January 3 (in which likely caucus-goers were deemed to be over 40-percent evangelical), with commentators opining that Romney hoped it would effectively answer the media's longtime preoccupation with the hurdle manifested by Romney's faith, Romney's campaign billed the speech as extolling American freedom of worship while helping to satisfy public curiosity about how Romney's strain of religious devotion would inform presidential governance. After the speech was delivered, Romney's advisors told reporters, off the record, that Romney had said that through this speech he wanted to address his "comma problem": the common practice to put next to his name in media reports, "(comma) who is a Mormon (comma)."

Romney's speech gave primacy to the American Constitutional right of religious liberty, which produces cultural diversity and vibrancy of dialog. He called for public acknowledgement of God such as within Holidays religious displays. Romney said, "Freedom requires religion just as religion requires freedom.". He cited a religious nature to historic abolitionists' campaigns, the campaign for American Civil Rights, and the contemporary campaign for the Right to Life. Romney advocated the maintenance of a separation of Church and State, stating that he, as president, would decline directives from churches' hierarchies, including that of the LDS church.

Romney said while there are those who would prefer he indicated he holds his LDS faith merely as a tradition, actually he believes in his faith and tries to live according to its teachings, and while sacraments and confession of Romney's "church's beliefs about Christ may not all be the same as those of other faiths," he still holds Christ "the Son of God and Savior of mankind." Romney declined to address further the specifics of his Mormonism, implying that any compulsion to do so would counter the Constitutional prohibition of a religious test for political office. Romney wrote the speech himself.

In the speech, Romney said, "I saw my father march with Martin Luther King." Some weeks later, the Romney campaign, when asked for the specifics, indicated this to have been an NAACP-sponsored procession in Grosse Pointe, Michigan, led by George W. Romney. However, there are conflicting accounts as to whether King was present at this march.

In an interview with Newsweek, Romney said, "I don't think I defined religious liberty ... it includes all, all forms of personal conviction. ... The people who don't have a particular faith have a personal conviction. I said all forms of personal conviction. And personal conviction includes a sense of right and wrong and any host of beliefs someone might have. Obviously in this nation, our religious liberty includes the ability to believe or not believe."

=== Media coverage ===
Contrasting media coverage, Mormonism was not an issue in his father's presidential campaign in 1968. Possible reasons include: he dropped out before it could become one, the candidacy of John F. Kennedy (a Catholic) had neutralized the religion issue, and religion generally was not a major stump issue. During the Boca Raton debate of January 24, 2008, NBC Nightly News anchor Brian Williams asked Romney: "Governor, we've got [a poll ...] in the morning that says ... 44 percent of respondents say a Mormon president would have a difficult time uniting the country. ... " ... to which Romney replied:

You know, I just don't believe that people in this country are going to choose their, their, candidate based on which church he or she goes to. I just don't believe that.

And you know, polls ask people a lot of questions, and my faith isn't terribly well-known around this country, but I don't think for a minute the American people are going to say, 'You know what, we're not going to vote for this guy for a secular position because of his church.' I just don't believe it.

I think when the Constitution and the founders said no religious test shall ever be required for qualification for office or public trust in these United States that the founders meant just that. And I don't believe for a minute that Republicans, or Americans for that matter, are going to impose a religious test when the founders said it's as un-American as anything you can think of.

And so I believe that I'll ultimately get the nomination. I can't be sure of that, but I'm, I'm, pretty confident. And I believe in a head-to-head with Hillary Clinton the differences in our perspectives on how to get America going again and how to get us on the right track are as different as night and day. She takes her inspiration from the Europe of old, Big Brother, big government and big taxes. I take mine from Republican ideals: small government, small taxes, individual freedom. I believe that free American people are the source of America's greatness.

And so I don't think you're going to see religion figuring into this race after people have had a chance to get to know all the candidates.

Romney's "Faith in America" speech, delivered in December 2007, addressed the matter. In it, Romney said he should neither be elected nor rejected based upon his religion, and echoed Senator John F. Kennedy's famous speech during his 1960 presidential campaign in saying "I will put no doctrine of any church above the plain duties of the office and the sovereign authority of the law." Instead of discussing the specific tenets of his faith, he said that he would be informed by it and that, "Freedom requires religion just as religion requires freedom. Freedom and religion endure together, or perish alone."

One academic study, based upon research conducted throughout the 2008 primaries, showed a widespread lack of knowledge among voters about Mormonism that tended to be resistant to factual information that would correct mistaken notions about the religion. The authors reasoned that for Romney religion has become an item of interest for voters. Another study, analyzing a survey conducted during January 2008 found that voters had selectively internalized the notion of religious equality, and in particular not extended it to Mormons, thus making Romney's run more difficult. Those authors concluded that, "for a Mormon candidate, the road to the presidency remains very rough ... The bias against a Mormon candidate is substantial."

The June 13, 2011, issue of Newsweek magazine featured a Romney-themed cover based on the popular Book of Mormon Broadway musical, and dubbed the summer of 2011 "The Mormon Moment".

=== Impact on political philosophy ===
Romney's foreign policy views are rooted in the belief in American exceptionalism and the need to preserve American supremacy in the world. This parallels the Mormon belief that the United States Constitution is divinely inspired and that the U.S. was selected by God to play a special part in human history. Indeed, Romney's political beliefs regarding a limited role for government, a need for self-reliance, and requirements for welfare recipients, often reflect Mormon tenets adapted for the secular world.

=== 2008 election ===
Romney on his religious faith:

I found that finally addressing it in a speech and drawing people's attention to the fact that the nature of our country is one of religious pluralism was in my view a very effective way of bringing attention to this issue and settling it for the great majority of Americans. I think for most Americans they're not terribly concerned about someone's religious beliefs, unless of course it relates to their love of the country or something like that. I think we dealt with that in our [2008] campaign in a relatively effective way for most people.

In polls of Republican voters taken during the 2008 presidential primaries a quarter of Republican voters expressed that they would be "less likely" to vote for a presidential candidate who is Mormon. Among other criticisms, some evangelical voters view the LDS Church as a cult. However, some social conservatives and evangelicals criticize Romney for not being Mormon enough, regarding social policy. He has avoided speaking publicly about specific church doctrines, and has pointed out that the U.S. Constitution prohibits religious tests for public office. Declining to discuss details about his religion also reduced the risk that doctrinal differences will alienate evangelical Christian voters. Romney instead addressed religion in general, saying that as president he would "need the prayers of the people of all faiths," and that he would "serve no one religion, no one group, no one cause, and no one interest. A president must serve only the common cause of the people of the United States."

Mitt Romney was the third U.S. presidential candidate of the Mormon faith to have a high likelihood of achieving a major political party's nomination. The first of these three was Romney's own father, George W. Romney, a progressive on Civil Rights who reorganized the American Motors Corporation. George Romney, while Governor of Michigan, ran for president in 1968 as a popular alternative to Richard M. Nixon for Republican nomination.

The second was Mo Udall, the liberal Arizona congressman. He gained considerable support throughout the 1976 primary race as a rival to Jimmy Carter, who campaigned as a devout evangelical. During the latter part of Udall's campaign, he faced criticism from black activists concerning the fact that the church stated as his religious affiliation, the LDS Church, barred black members from holding its lay priesthood. (This policy was changed in 1978.) In response to this criticism, Udall withdrew nominal affiliation with the denomination in 1976.

Differing from Udall, Mitt Romney is a social conservative. Paralleling Udall's rivalry with the outspokenly evangelical candidate Jimmy Carter, one of Romney's chief rivals in 2007 was also a self-professing evangelical and former Southern governor, Mike Huckabee.

Romney is a proponent of contemporary monogamous, heterosexual marriage:

There is nothing more awful, in my view, than the violation of the marriage covenant that one has with one's wife. The practice of polygamy is abhorrent, it's awful, and it drives me nuts that people who are polygamists keep pretending to use the umbrella of my church. ... My church abhors it, it excommunicates people who practice it, and it's got nothing to do with my faith.

=== 2012 election ===
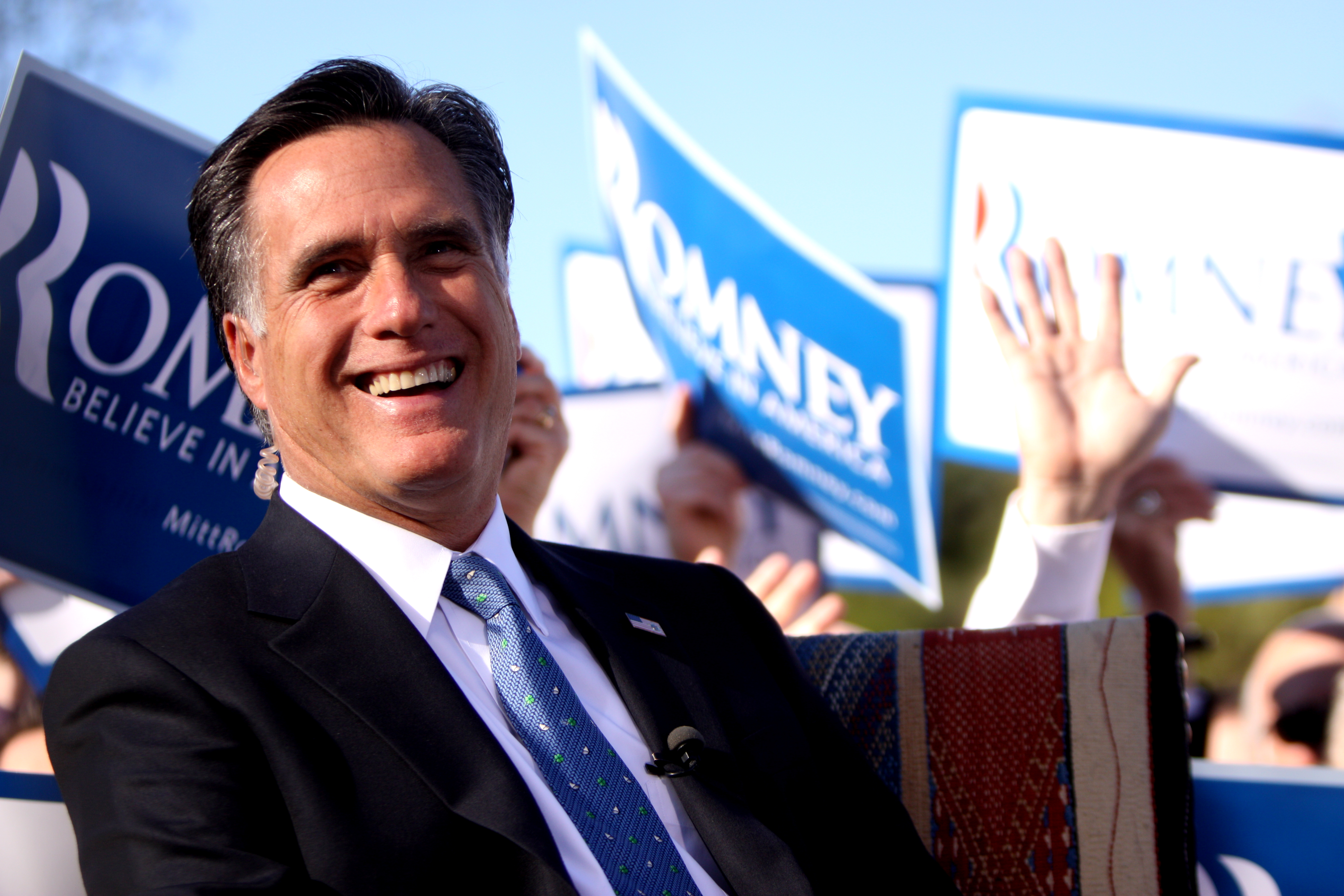
Mitt Romney laughing while campaigning in Paradise Valley, AZ, 2011

The question of whether Mormons are considered "Christians" remains a sensitive issue, with possible political implications. As such, analysts expected Romney's affiliation with the LDS Church to become an issue again on the campaign trail. In regards to that question, a June 2011 Pew Research poll, found that one out of every four American voters said they would be less likely to vote for a candidate if he or she were Mormon.

When asked about his faith's view on gay rights in a June 2011 interview with CNN's Piers Morgan, Romney stated:

I'm not a spokesman for my church, and one thing I'm not going to do in running for president is become a spokesman for my church or apply a religious test that is simply forbidden by the Constitution, I'm not going there. If you want to learn about my church, talk to my church.

Rick Santorum was asked if Jon Huntsman and Mitt Romney will have problems in the race as Mormons. Santorum answered,

"I hope not." He continued, "I hope that people will look at the qualities of candidates and look at what they believe and what they're for and look their records and then make a decision."

Joe Biden said;

"I find it preposterous that in 2011 we're debating whether or not a man is qualified or worthy of your vote based on whether or not his religion ... is a disqualifying provision," Biden told an audience at the University of Pittsburgh. "It is not. It is embarrassing and we should be ashamed, anyone who thinks that way," he said in a response to a student's question about how his own religious faith affected his philosophy of government.

On State of the Union with Candy Crowley, David Axelrod was asked on Mormonism as a campaign issue. He said: "We've said that's not fair game".

== See also ==
- Mitt (film)
- Latter Day Saint political history
- Culture of the Church of Jesus Christ of Latter-day Saints
- Criticism of the Church of Jesus Christ of Latter-day Saints
- Presidents and Prophets

== Bibliography ==
- Balz, Dan; Johnson, Haynes (2009). The Battle for America, 2008: The Story of an Extraordinary Election. New York: Viking Penguin. ISBN 978-0-670-02111-6.
- Heilemann, John; Halperin, Mark (2010). Game Change: Obama and the Clintons, McCain and Palin, and the Race of a Lifetime. New York: HarperCollins. ISBN 978-0-06-173363-5.
- Hewitt, Hugh (2007). A Mormon in the White House?: 10 Things Every American Should Know About Mitt Romney. Washington: Regnery Publishing. ISBN 978-1-59698-502-5.
- Kranish, Michael; Helman, Scott (2012). The Real Romney. New York: HarperCollins. ISBN 978-0-06-212327-5.
