= List of Christian clergy in politics =

== Background ==
There are existing sub-sections on religious denominations to deal with Christian lay people in politics, e.g. List of LDS politicians. This list is for politicians who also do Christian pastoral work, both ordained clergy and evangelists or theologians. It is therefore not appropriate to add Christian lay people to the list, although some noted theologians in the laity are included as relational.

Note that some people on this list only became clergy after their political careers.

== List ==
=== Anglican ===
- Jonathan Aitken – Church of England Vicar, Conservative Party MP, Chief Secretary to the Treasury, and Minister for Defence Procurement
- John Bani – President and head of state of Vanuatu from 25 March 1998 until 24 March 2004; Anglican priest
- Timothy Beaumont, Baron Beaumont of Whitley – UK politician; first member of the House of Lords to sit as a member of the Green Party; Anglican priest
- Dennis Drainville – New Democratic MPP for Ontario from 1990 to 1993. Later Anglican Bishop of Quebec from 2009 to 2017.
- Stephen Green, Baron Green of Hurstpierpoint - Conservative Minister of State for Trade and Investment from 2011 to 2013, Member of House of Lords Temporal since 2010, Church of England priest
- Lee Jae-joung – National Assembly member and Unification Minister of South Korea; Anglican priest
- Walter Lini – founding Prime Minister of Vanuatu (succeeded by Bani); Anglican priest
- Peter Douglas Koon – Hong Kong Anglican Priest, provincial secretary general of Hong Kong Sheng Kung Hui, Member of the Beijing Municipal Committee of the Chinese People's Political Consultative Conference, Member of the Hong Kong Legislative Council
- J. G. MacManaway – British Unionist who was disqualified from sitting on Parliament due to his status as a priest; Church of Ireland priest
- Jacob Mountain – Canadian Politician. Member of the Legislative Council of Lower Canada from 1793 - 1825 and a Member of the Legislative Council of Upper Canada from 1793 to 1825. 1st Anglican Bishop of Quebec.
- Wavel Ramkalawan – Anglican priest and 5th President of the Seychelles
- John Terris – Anglican priest, Labour politician, Deputy Speaker (hence also Acting Speaker), and Chairman of Committees of the New Zealand House of Representatives from 1984 to 1990. Mayor of Lower Hutt City 1995–2004.
- K.H. Ting – Anglican priest, Bishop of Chekiang, vice-chairman of the Chinese People's Political Consultative Conference (1989–2008), and a member of the National People's Congress, China's legislature.
- Bernadine Craft – Former Member of Wyoming House of Representatives and Wyoming's State Senate.
- John Danforth – former United States Ambassador to the United Nations and former Republican United States Senator from Missouri; ordained Episcopal priest
- Kim Jackson – Democratic Georgia State Senator. First openly out LGBT state senator in Georgian history.
- Wythe Leigh Kinsolving – Episcopal priest, essayist and campaigner for Democratic candidates in 1910s-1930s, and against US participation in World War II in late 1930s through 1941
- James Kilbourne – Episcopal Priest, surveyor, and Democratic-Republican member of the Ohio legislature and the US House of Representatives
- Bob Massie – Episcopal Priest and Democratic nominee for Lieutenant Governor of Massachusetts in 1994

=== Baptist ===
- Benny M. Abante – former two-termed Congressman of the Philippines; awarded as Most Outstanding Congressmen of Philippines in the 13th and 14th Congresses; founder and pastor of Metropolitan Bible Baptist Church in the Philippines
- William Aberhart – founder of the Social Credit Party of Alberta
- Brian Babin - Baptist Deacon and Republican representing Texas's 36th congressional district
- Chuck Baldwin – United States Constitution Party activist and Baptist pastor
- E.W. Jackson – Lawyer and Baptist Minister and bishop; candidate for Lieutenant Governor of Virginia
- Ross Clifford – Australian politician; New South Wales Legislative Council and Australian Senate candidate; Baptist theologian
- Doug Collins - Southern Baptist Pastor, Military Chaplain and 12th Secretary of the VA
- Tom Corbin - Baptist Deacon and Republican serving as a member of the South Carolina Senate from the 5th District
- Thomas Clement "Tommy" Douglas – Canadian social democratic politician and Baptist minister; elected to the Canadian House of Commons in 1935 as a member of the Co-operative Commonwealth Federation (CCF); became the Saskatchewan CCF's leader, then the seventh Premier of Saskatchewan, 1944–1961
- Walter E. Fauntroy – former member of United States Congress and Baptist pastor
- Ernie Fletcher – Governor of Kentucky, 2003–2007
- James Garrard – Governor of Kentucky, 1796–1804
- William H. Gray – former Congressman and minister
- Mark Harris – Baptist Pastor and Republican as the U.S. representative for North Carolina's 8th congressional district
- Jody Hice – Baptist Pastor and Republican serving Georgia's 10th congressional district
- Benjamin Hooks – American civil rights leader and Baptist minister
- Mike Huckabee – former governor of Arkansas and Baptist minister
- Tim Hutchinson – former Senator from Arkansas and former Baptist pastor
- Jesse Jackson – civil rights activist and Baptist minister
- Neal Jackson – Baptist Pastor and Republican member for the 78th district of the North Carolina House of Representatives
- Francys Johnson – Baptist Pastor who ran for the U.S. House Georgia District 12 and was defeated
- Brenden Jones – Baptist Deacon and Republican representing the 46th district of the North Carolina House of Representatives
- James Lankford – former member of the United States House of Representative (2011–2015) and current United States Senator from the State of Oklahoma. Lankford served as a student ministry and evangelism specialist with the Baptist General Convention of Oklahoma and Falls Creek Baptist Conference Center. He is a graduate of Southwestern Baptist Theological Seminary in Fort Worth, TX.
- Martin Luther King Jr. – civil rights activist and Baptist minister
- William H. King, III – Baptist Pastor and former City Councilman for Dickinson, TX. Democratic candidate for Galveston County Judge.
- Ron Lewis – Republican member of the United States House of Representatives from Kentucky between 1994 and 2009; Baptist minister
- Dan Patrick – Baptist (Guest) Pastor and Republican serving as the 42nd lieutenant governor of Texas
- Adam Clayton Powell Jr. – thirteen term Congressman from Harlem, New York City (1945–1971); Pastor Abyssinian Baptist Church in Harlem (1937–1972)
- Pat Robertson – Republican supporter, former United States presidential nomination candidate, and former Baptist pastor.
- Phil Shepard – Baptist Pastor and Republican member of the North Carolina General Assembly representing the 15th district
- William Tolbert – Member of the Liberian House of Representatives, Vice-President of Liberia, and last President of Liberia who represented the True Whig Party and the old Americo-Liberian aristocracy. Baptist minister and first African president of the Baptist World Alliance
- Raphael Warnock – United States Senator from Georgia, elected January 2021. Senior pastor at Ebenezer Baptist Church.
- Roger Wicker – A Baptist Deacon and Republican Senator in Mississippi

=== Roman Catholicism ===
- Barthélemy Boganda – former priest and Central African politician
- Jean-Bertrand Aristide – former President of Haiti; former Catholic priest
- Ernesto Cardenal – former Minister for Culture for Nicaragua and Catholic priest
- Robert John Cornell – Norbertine priest and Representative from Wisconsin from 1975 to 1979
- James Renshaw Cox – US presidency candidate and Catholic priest
- Robert Drinan – Roman Catholic Jesuit priest, lawyer, human rights activist, and Democratic US Representative from Massachusetts
- Jerome D'Souza – Indian Jesuit, member of the Constituent Assembly of India 1946–50
- José Manuel Gallegos – Priest and New Mexico delegate from 1853 to 1856
- Ivan Grubišić – Roman Catholic priest, sociologist, and independent representative in the Croatian Parliament
- Andrej Hlinka – Slovak public activist and Catholic priest
- Theodor Innitzer (later Cardinal Innitzer) – Austrian Minister of Social Administration (1929–1930)
- Ludwig Kaas – prominent German politician during Weimar Republic and Catholic priest
- Gabriel Wilhelmus Manek, S.V.D. - Member of Provincial Parliament (M.P.P) of East Indonesia
- Hugo Kołłątaj – Polish social and political activist, political thinker, historian, philosopher and Catholic priest
- Fernando Arturo de Meriño – President of the Dominican Republic (1880–1882)
- Mihovil Pavlinović – Roman Catholic priest, writer, and People's Party representative in the Diet of Dalmatia, Croatian Parliament and Austro-Hungarian Imperial Council
- Gabriel Richard – French Roman Catholic priest who became a delegate from Michigan Territory to the US House of Representatives
- Ignaz Seipel – Chancellor of Austria for two stints during the 1920s
- Josip Juraj Strossmayer – bishop of the Roman Catholic Diocese of Đakovo, leader of the People's Party, member of the Croatian Parliament, prefect of the Virovitica County, and President of the Croatian Royal Board
- Stanisław Staszic – Polish priest, philosopher, statesman, geologist, scholar, poet and writer; a leader of the Polish Enlightenment; famous for works related to the "Great" or "Four-Year Sejm" (1788–1792) and its Constitution of 3 May 1791
- Luigi Sturzo – one of the founders of the Italian People's Party; Catholic priest
- Jozef Tiso – fascist Slovak politician of the SPP; Roman Catholic priest who became a deputy of the Czechoslovak parliament, a member of the Czechoslovak government, and finally the President of Independent Slovak Republic from 1939 to 1945, allied with Nazi Germany
- Beda Weber – German Benedictine professor, author, and member of the Frankfurt Parliament

==== Eastern Catholic Churches ====
- Paul Weyrich – U.S. conservative political activist and commentator, ordained protodeacon in the Melkite Greek Catholic Church

=== Congregational Church ===
- Bryan Berghoef - Pastor, United Church of Christ and a Democrat who ran for Michigan House of Representatives District 2
- Samuel C. Fessenden – U.S. Congressman, pastor
- Washington Gladden – leading American Congregational church pastor leading member of the Progressive Movement, serving for two years as a member of the Columbus, Ohio city council
- Derek Jones – first Mayor of Gaborone, Botswana 1966–68
- Fred Nile – New South Wales Legislative Council (Australia) member and Fellowship of Congregational Churches minister
- Shane Reeves – Church of Christ Deacon and Republican for the Tennessee State Senate District 14
- Andrew Young – civil rights activist; former mayor of Atlanta, Georgia; America's first African-American ambassador to the United Nations; United Church of Christ pastor

=== Disciples of Christ ===
- James A. Garfield – preacher, teacher, and lawyer from Ohio before becoming a Congressman and later the 20th President of the United States
- Gerald L. K. Smith – founder of the quasi-fascist America First Party; Disciples of Christ minister
- Jim Spainhower – U.S. politician from Missouri and former Disciples of Christ minister

=== Dutch Reformed Church ===
- Thomas François Burgers – President of the South African Republic 1871–77; pastor
- Rowan Cronjé – Rhodesian/South African politician, Member of Parliament and cabinet minister
- Abraham Kuyper – Dutch politician, journalist, statesman and theologian; founded the Anti-Revolutionary Party and was Prime Minister of the Netherlands between 1901 and 1905; Dutch Reformed Church minister
- Daniel François Malan – former Prime Minister of South Africa and minister

=== Eastern Orthodox Churches ===
- Boulos Basili – priest, first priest to enter the Egyptian Assembly in 1971 after winning a free election in his district Shoubra, in Cairo, Egypt; served in the parliament until 1975
- Miron Cristea – first Patriarch of the Romanian Orthodox Church and Prime Minister of Romania
- Damaskinos – Archbishop of Athens and All Greece (primate of the Church of Greece) and Regent of Greece (1944–1946) for the exiled King George II
- Makarios III – archbishop and primate of the autocephalous Cypriot Orthodox Church (1950–1977) and first President of the Republic of Cyprus (1960–1977)
- Fan S. Noli – Albanian Orthodox bishop and politician, who served briefly as prime minister and regent of Albania in 1924
- Feofan Prokopovich – archbishop and statesman in the Russian Empire, elaborated and implemented Peter the Great's reform of the Russian Orthodox Church
- Mitro Repo – Finnish Orthodox Christian priest, member of the European Parliament from 2009 until 2014, elected as an independent candidate on the Social Democratic Party's ticket.

=== Evangelist ===
- Charles Colson – chief counsel for President of the United States Richard Nixon from 1969 to 1973 and was one of the Watergate Seven; maintains a variety of media channels which discuss contemporary issues from an Evangelical Christian worldview; his views are typically consistent with a politically conservative interpretation of evangelical Christianity
- Marcelo Crivella – Evangelical pastor, mayor of Rio de Janeiro
- Eduardo Villanueva – known as Bro. Eddie; religious and political leader in the Philippines; 2010 Philippine presidential candidate; founder and leader of the Jesus is Lord Church
- Dan Johnson – known as the "Pope;" Elected to the Kentucky House of Representatives for the 49th District; Committed suicide after allegations and investigations for child molestation
- Johnny Teague – Pastor of an Evangelical Church and Republican who ran for Texas' District 9 seat

=== Evangelical Lutheran ===
- Lauri Ingman – Archbishop of Turku (1930–1934), Prime Minister of Finland (1918–1919, 1924–1925)
- Dean Johnson – former majority leader of the Minnesota Senate; minister in the Evangelical Lutheran Church in America

=== Lutheran ===
- Ida Auken – Denmark
- Margrete Auken – Denmark
- Kjell Magne Bondevik – Norwegian Lutheran minister and politician; Prime Minister of Norway from 1997 to 2000, and from 2001 to 2005
- Joachim Gauck – President of Germany from 2012 to 2017
- Walter H. Moeller – American politician of the Democratic party; entered a Lutheran seminary in 1935 and served as a pastor in the 1940s and after his retirement from politics
- Frederick Muhlenberg – First Speaker of the US House of Representatives; 1793–1795.
- W. T. P. Simarmata – Bishop (Ephorus) of the Batak Christian Protestant Church (HKBP) from 2012 to 2016, later member of the Indonesian Regional Representative Council from 2019 to 2022

=== Methodist ===
- Canaan Banana – president of Zimbabwe and Methodist minister
- Henry Augustus Buchtel – American public official and educator, ordained to the Methodist Episcopal ministry and served for a year as a missionary in Bulgaria
- John Bull – American clergyman and physician who represented Missouri in the US Congress in 1833 and 1834
- Emanuel Cleaver – United Methodist pastor and a Democratic politician from the state of Missouri; elected to the United States House of Representatives in November 2004 to represent Missouri's 5th congressional district
- Robert W. Edgar – former Congressman and Methodist pastor
- Adam Hamilton – Methodist Minister and current senator-elect from Kansas
- Hong Ki-Ju – Methodist Minister, Korean Independence activist, co-founder of Korean Social Democratic Party, member of Korean Provisional People's Committee, member of North Korean Legislature, Vice Chairman of the Standing Committee of the 1st Supreme People's Assembly of North Korea, and Minister of Justice
- Robert P. Shuler – Prohibition Party candidate who received the highest vote in any election in US history; Methodist pastor
- Johnnie Simpson Jr. – United Methodist pastor, Councilman for Dickinson TX, and board member for Houston-Galveston Area Council.
- Donald Soper, Baron Soper – prominent Methodist minister, socialist and pacifist
- Ted Strickland – Governor of Ohio, briefly a United Methodist pastor
- Silas C. Swallow – U.S. Methodist preacher and prohibitionist politician
- George Thomas, 1st Viscount Tonypandy – lay preacher, British and Welsh Labour M.P. in the House of Commons and served as Speaker of the House
- Aaron S. Watkins – Prohibition Party candidate and Methodist minister
- Robert L. Williams – third Governor of Oklahoma and Methodist minister
- Terry Wynn – Methodist local preacher and Member of the European Parliament
- Yi Yun-Yong – Methodist Minister, Korean Independence activist, co-founder of Korean Social Democratic Party, served in the South Pyeongan Province branch of the Committee for the Preparation of Korean Independence, Vice chair of the Pyongyang People's Political Committee, member of the National Assembly of the Republic of Korea, and served as the acting Prime Minister of the Republic of Korea, and as minister-without-portfolio in the Rhee Administration

=== Pentecostal ===
- Aniym Pius Aniym – Pentecostal pastor, president of Nigerian senate
- Andrew Evans – South Australian Legislative Council (Family First Party) member and Pentecostal Christian pastor
- Anne McBride – Canadian politician ordained in the Assemblies of God
- Frederick Chiluba – Pentecostal pastor, President of Zambia
- Judy Turner – New Zealand politician, pastoral and community worker at New Life Churches, New Zealand

=== Presbyterian ===
- William H. Hudnut III – Presbyterian minister, Congressional representative from Indiana 1972–1974, four-term mayor of Indianapolis
- Ian Paisley – First Minister of Northern Ireland, veteran politician and church leader in Northern Ireland; founding member and former Moderator of the Free Presbyterian Church of Ulster
- Ham Tae-Young – 3rd Vice-President of the Republic of Korea, judge during the Korean Empire, Korean independence and nationalist leader
- Stephanie Stahl Hamilton – Ordained PCUSA minister, Democratic member of both Arizona House of Representatives and the state senate
- Kang Ryang-uk – Presbyterian Minister, Relative of Kim Il-Sung, secretary general of the Provisional People's Committee of North Korea, representative of the 1st class of the Supreme People's Assembly of Korea, Secretary of the Standing Committee, Chairman of the Korean Christian Federation, Vice-chairman and later Chairman of the North Korean Social Democratic Party, and was twice elected as Vice-president
- Larry Pittman – Republican member of the North Carolina General Assembly and ordained minister in the Presbyterian Church of America
- James Smith – Presbyterian minister who was appointed to a diplomatic post in Scotland by President Abraham Lincoln
- Norman Thomas – Presbyterian minister who was a six-time presidential nominee for the Socialist Party of America.
- John Witherspoon – signatory of the United States Declaration of Independence as a representative of New Jersey; the only active clergyman to sign the Declaration
- Arnold Nordmeyer - Presbyterian Minister, Minister of Finance (1957–1960), Leader of the Labour Party and Leader of the Opposition (1963–1965).

=== United Church ===
- Bill Blaikie – retired Deputy Speaker of the House of Commons of Canada from 2006 to 2008; a Member of Parliament since 1979, representing the Winnipeg riding of Elmwood–Transcona and its antecedents as a member of the New Democratic Party; Minister of United Church of Canada
- Lorne Calvert – former premier of the Canadian province of Saskatchewan and current leader of Her Majesty's Loyal Opposition, as leader of the Saskatchewan New Democratic Party; ordained minister of United Church of Canada
- Cheri DiNovo - NDP MPP for Ontario's Provincial Parliament and ordained United Church of Canada minister.
- Brian Howe – Australian politician, was Deputy Prime Minister in the Labor government of Paul Keating, and minister of Uniting Church in Australia
- Stanley Knowles – Canadian parliamentarian; United Church minister
- Doug Lauchlan – Canadian politician, minister and educator, ordained minister in the United Church of Canada
- David MacDonald – United Church of Canada minister and a former Canadian politician and author
- Doug Martindale – politician in Manitoba, Canada; member of the Legislative Assembly of Manitoba since 1990, serving as a member of the New Democratic Party; ordained United Church minister
- Davis McCaughey – key architect in the formation of the Uniting Church in Australia; Governor of Victoria 1986–1992
- Keith Seaman – Uniting Church in Australia
- Lloyd Stinson – politician in Manitoba, Canada; leader of that province's Co-operative Commonwealth Federation (CCF) from 1953 to 1959; ordained United Church minister

=== Other ===
- Gregorio Aglipay – first supreme bishop of the Philippine Independent Church
- Harold Albrecht – Brethren in Christ
- Benjamin W. Arnett – Ohio State Legislature politician and African Methodist Episcopal Church pastor
- Cori Bush - Pastor of the Kingdom Embassy International Church and Democrat for Missouri's 1st congressional district
- Graham Capill – Reformed Churches of New Zealand
- William Irvine – Methodist, then Unitarian
- Donald Malinowski – Polish National Catholic Church
- Kenneth Meshoe – Hope of Glory Tabernacle
- Gordon Moyes – New South Wales Legislative Council (Australia), Christian Democratic Party member, Churches of Christ in Australia minister
- Douglas Nicholls – Churches of Christ in Australia
- Clementa C. Pinckney – African Methodist Episcopal
- Hiram Rhodes Revels – African Methodist Episcopal
- Efraín Ríos Montt – Church of the Word

=== Unclassified ===
- Scott Craig – Pastor of Bighorn Canyon Community Church; has represented district 33 in the South Dakota House of Representatives since 11 January 2013
- Jerone Davison - Pastor in Maricopa County, Arizona; Republican candidate for Arizona's 4th congressional district.
- Reinhold Niebuhr – Christian Realism; in his younger days he was a socialist candidate for New York State Senate
- Wavel Ramkalawan – Seychelles politician and priest
- John I. Sauls - Non-Denominational Pastor (former) and Republican representing the 51st district in the North Carolina House of Representatives
- Tuve Skånberg
- Albert Edward Smith – Communist Party of Canada politician, but considered himself Christian throughout
- William Horace Temple – Christian Socialist
- László Tőkés – Bishop in Reformed Church in Romania and involved in the Democratic Union of Hungarians in Romania
- Tim Walberg – non-denominational Protestant

== See also ==
- List of American politicians with religious occupations

== Sources ==
- Political graveyard clergy/politicians section
