= Raphael Warnock =

American pastor and politician (born 1969)

The Reverend Raphael Warnock
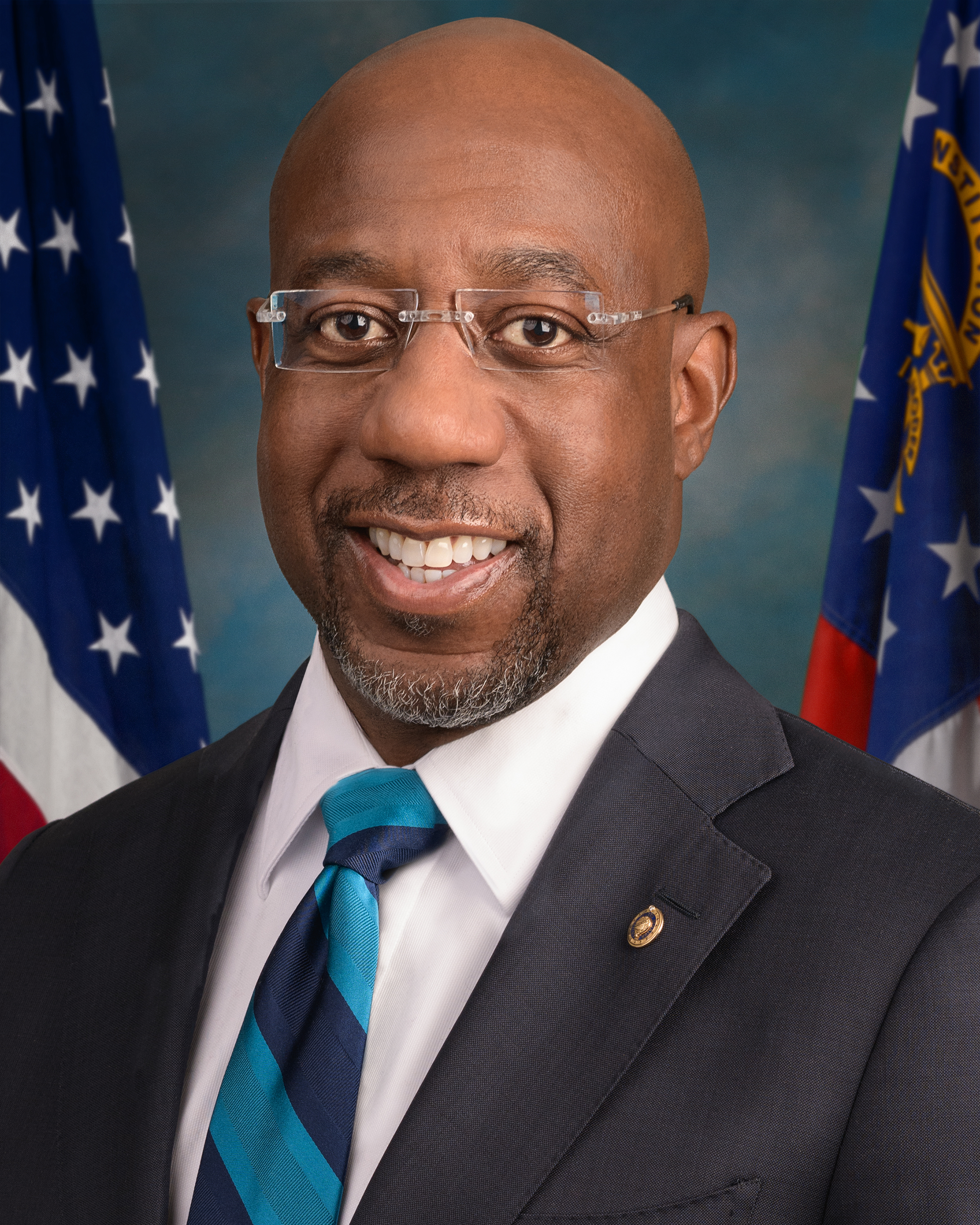
- Official portrait, 2021

United States Senator from Georgia
- Incumbent
- Assumed office January 20, 2021 Serving with Jon Ossoff
- Preceded by: Kelly Loeffler

Personal details
- Born: Raphael Gamaliel Warnock; July 23, 1969 (age 57) Savannah, Georgia, U.S.
- Party: Democratic
- Spouse: Oulèye Ndoye (m. 2016; div. 2020)
- Children: 2
- Education: Morehouse College (BA); Union Theological Seminary (MDiv, MPhil, PhD)
- Occupation: Politician; pastor; minister
- Website: Senate website Campaign website

Religious life
- Religion: Christian
- Denomination: Baptist (Progressive National Baptist Convention)
- Church: Ebenezer Baptist Church

Senior posting
- Post: Senior pastor (2005–present)
- Raphael Warnock's voice Raphael Warnock speaks in support of the nomination of Ketanji Brown Jackson to the Supreme Court; Recorded April 7, 2022

Raphael Gamaliel Warnock (Note: "Raphael Warnock" is pronounced /ˈrɑːfiɛl ˈwɔːrnɒk/, RAH-fee-el WOR-nok) (born July 23, 1969) is an American politician and Mainline Protestant minister in the Baptist tradition serving since 2021 as the junior (Note: Despite being sworn in at the same time as fellow Georgia Senator Jon Ossoff, Warnock is the junior senator because Ossoff's surname precedes Warnock's alphabetically.) United States senator from Georgia. A member of the Democratic Party, Warnock has been the senior pastor of Atlanta's Ebenezer Baptist Church since 2005.

Warnock was the senior pastor of Douglas Memorial Community Church from 2001 to 2005. He came to prominence in Georgia politics as a leading activist in the campaign to expand Medicaid in the state under the Affordable Care Act. He was the Democratic nominee in the 2020 United States Senate special election in Georgia, defeating incumbent Republican Kelly Loeffler in a runoff election.

Warnock and Jon Ossoff are the first Democrats elected to the U.S. Senate from Georgia since Zell Miller in 2000. Their elections were critical in securing a 50–50 Senate majority for Democrats, with Vice President Kamala Harris serving as the tie-breaking vote. Warnock was a reliable supporter of Joe Biden's legislative efforts during his presidency. He was reelected to a full term in 2022, defeating Republican nominee Herschel Walker.

Warnock is the first African American to represent Georgia in the Senate, the first Black Democrat elected to the Senate from a Southern state, and only the second black U.S. senator directly elected from a Southern state, after Tim Scott.

== Early life and education ==
Warnock was born in Savannah, Georgia, on July 23, 1969. He grew up in public housing as the eleventh of twelve children born to Verlene (née Brooks) and Jonathan Warnock, both Pentecostal pastors. His father served in the U.S. Army during World War II, where he learned automobile mechanics and welding, and subsequently opened a small car restoration business where he restored junked cars for resale. His mother picked cotton and tobacco in the summers in Waycross, Georgia, as a teenager and became a pastor.

Warnock graduated from Sol C. Johnson High School in 1987, and having wanted to follow in the footsteps of Martin Luther King Jr., attended Morehouse College, from which he graduated cum laude in 1991 with a Bachelor of Arts degree in psychology. He credits his participation in the Upward Bound program for making him college-ready, as he was able to enroll in early college courses through Savannah State University. He then earned a Master of Divinity from Union Theological Seminary, a school affiliated with Columbia University. At Union, Warnock was mentored by James Cone. Warnock continued his studies and earned a Master of Philosophy, and a Doctor of Philosophy in 2006. In 2014, his dissertation was published as a book, The Divided Mind of the Black Church.

== Religious work ==
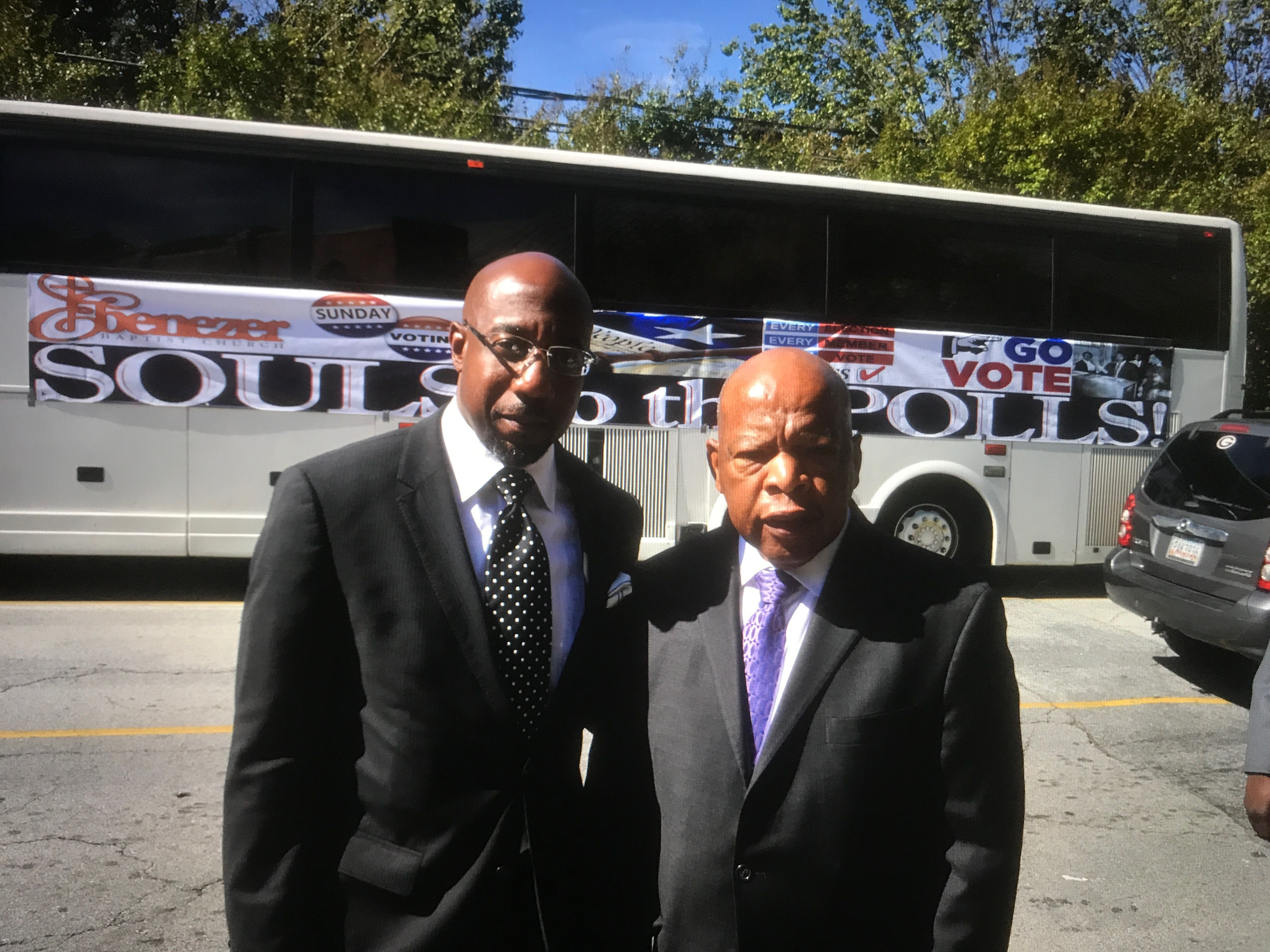
Warnock with John Lewis at a "Souls to the Polls" event. Warnock later officiated Lewis's funeral at Ebenezer Baptist Church.

Warnock began his ministry as an intern and licentiate at the Sixth Avenue Baptist church in Birmingham, Alabama, under the civil rights movement leader John Thomas Porter. In the 1990s, he served as youth pastor and then assistant pastor at Abyssinian Baptist Church in New York. While Warnock was pastor at Abyssinian, the church declined to hire workfare recipients as part of organized opposition to then-mayor Rudy Giuliani's workfare program. The church also hosted Fidel Castro on October 22, 1995, while Warnock was youth pastor. There is no evidence Warnock was involved in that decision. During the 2020–21 United States Senate special election in Georgia, his campaign refused to say whether Warnock attended the event.

In January 2001, Warnock was elected senior pastor of Douglas Memorial Community Church in Baltimore, Maryland. He and an assistant minister were arrested and charged with obstructing a 2002 police investigation into suspected child abuse at a summer camp run by the church. The police report called Warnock "extremely uncooperative and disruptive". Warnock had demanded that the counselors have lawyers present when being interviewed by police. The charges were later dropped with the deputy state's attorney's acknowledgment that it had been a "miscommunication", adding that Warnock had aided the investigation and that prosecution would be a waste of resources. Warnock said he was merely asserting that lawyers should be present during the interviews and that he had intervened to ensure that an adult was present while a juvenile suspect was being questioned. Warnock stepped down as the church's senior pastor in 2005.

On Father's Day 2005, Warnock was named senior pastor of the Ebenezer Baptist Church in Atlanta, Georgia, Martin Luther King Jr.'s former congregation; he is the fifth and the youngest person to serve as Ebenezer's senior pastor since its founding. He has continued in the post while serving in the Senate.

As pastor, Warnock advocated for clemency for Troy Davis, who was executed in 2011. In 2013, he delivered the benediction at the public prayer service at the second inauguration of Barack Obama. After Fidel Castro died in 2016, Warnock told his church to pray for the Cuban people, calling Castro's legacy "complex, kind of like America's legacy is complex". In March 2019, Warnock hosted an interfaith meeting on climate change at his church, featuring Al Gore and William Barber II. He presided at Representative John Lewis's funeral at Ebenezer Church in July 2020.

On Easter Sunday 2021, Warnock's Twitter account tweeted, "The meaning of Easter is more transcendent than the resurrection of Jesus Christ. Whether you are a Christian or not, through a commitment to helping others we are able to save ourselves." Some conservative Christians and political commentators criticized the tweet, including Benjamin Watson, Allie Beth Stuckey, and Jenna Ellis, who called it "heretical". The tweet was deleted that afternoon, with a spokesperson for Warnock saying, "the tweet was posted by staff and was not approved" but declining to say whether it reflected Warnock's beliefs.

== Political activism ==
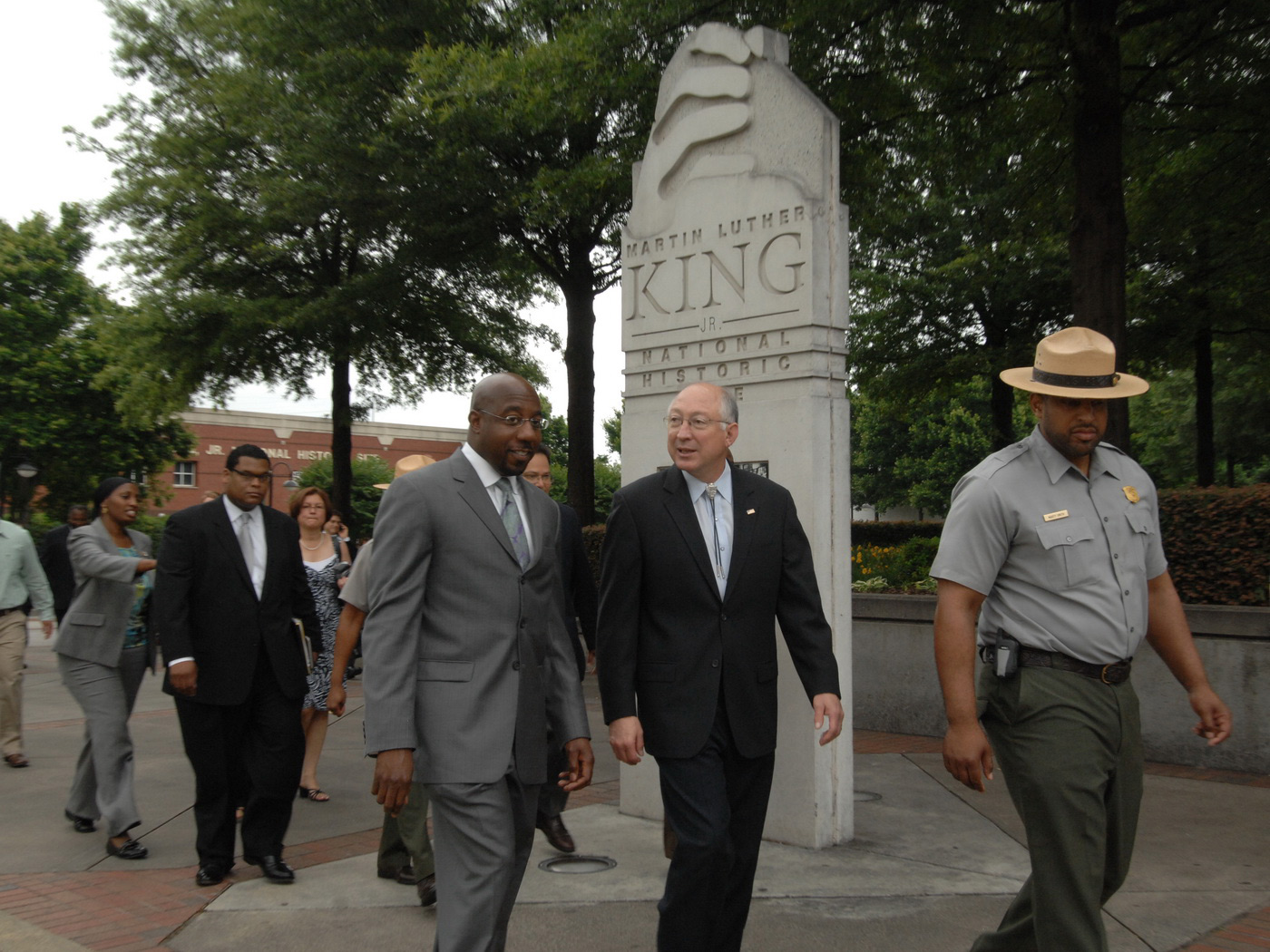
Warnock with Secretary of the Interior Ken Salazar at the Martin Luther King Jr. National Historical Park in 2009

Warnock came to prominence in Georgia politics as a leader in the campaign to expand Medicaid in the state. In 2013, he wrote an editorial for the Atlanta Journal Constitution that criticized Governor Nathan Deal for not supporting an integrated prom at the Wilcox County High School. In March 2014, Warnock led a sit-in at the Georgia State Capitol to press state legislators to accept the expansion of Medicaid offered by the Patient Protection and Affordable Care Act. He and other leaders were arrested during the protest. Warnock also actively campaigned for Georgia Democrats to increase outreach to low-income communities. In 2015, Warnock considered running in the 2016 election for the United States Senate seat held by Johnny Isakson as a member of the Democratic Party. He opted not to run.

From June 2017 to January 2020, Warnock chaired the New Georgia Project, a nonpartisan organization founded by Democrat Stacey Abrams and focused on increasing voter registration. In 2025, it admitted to 16 violations of state campaign finance laws related to its illegal partisan activities and was ordered to pay $300,000 by the Georgia State Ethics Commission, the largest fine for campaign finance violations in state history. The New Georgia Project raised and spent millions of dollars in its partisan efforts and failed to disclose its activities or properly register as an independent political committee.

Warnock supports expanding the Affordable Care Act and has called for the passage of the John Lewis Voting Rights Act. He also supports increasing COVID-19-relief funding. A proponent of abortion rights and gay marriage, he has been endorsed by Planned Parenthood. He opposes the concealed carry of firearms, saying that religious leaders do not want guns in places of worship. Warnock has long opposed the death penalty.

== United States Senator ==
=== Elections ===
==== 2020–21 Special ====
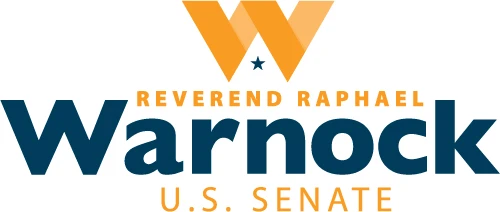
Warnock's U.S. Senate campaign logo

In January 2020, Warnock decided to run in the 2020 special election for the United States Senate seat held by Kelly Loeffler, who was appointed after Johnny Isakson's resignation. Stacey Abrams encouraged him to run and coordinated his support from Democratic leadership. He was endorsed by Democratic senators Chuck Schumer, Cory Booker, Sherrod Brown, Kirsten Gillibrand, Jeff Merkley, Chris Murphy, Bernie Sanders, Brian Schatz, and Elizabeth Warren; the Democratic Senatorial Campaign Committee; Stacey Abrams; and former presidents Barack Obama and Jimmy Carter. Several players of the Atlanta Dream, a WNBA team Loeffler co-owned at the time, wore shirts endorsing Warnock in response to controversial comments Loeffler made about the Black Lives Matter movement.

The closing argument of Warnock's campaign focused on the $2,000 stimulus payments that he and Ossoff promised to approve if they were elected and thus gave Democrats a U.S. Senate majority.

In the January 5 runoff election, Warnock narrowly defeated Loeffler with 51.04% of the vote. With this victory, he became the first African American to represent Georgia in the U.S. Senate, the first black Democratic U.S. senator representing a Southern state, and the first black Democrat elected to the U.S. Senate by a former state of the Confederacy. Warnock and Ossoff are the first Democrats elected to the U.S. Senate from Georgia since Zell Miller in 2000. On January 7, Loeffler conceded. The election result was certified on January 19.

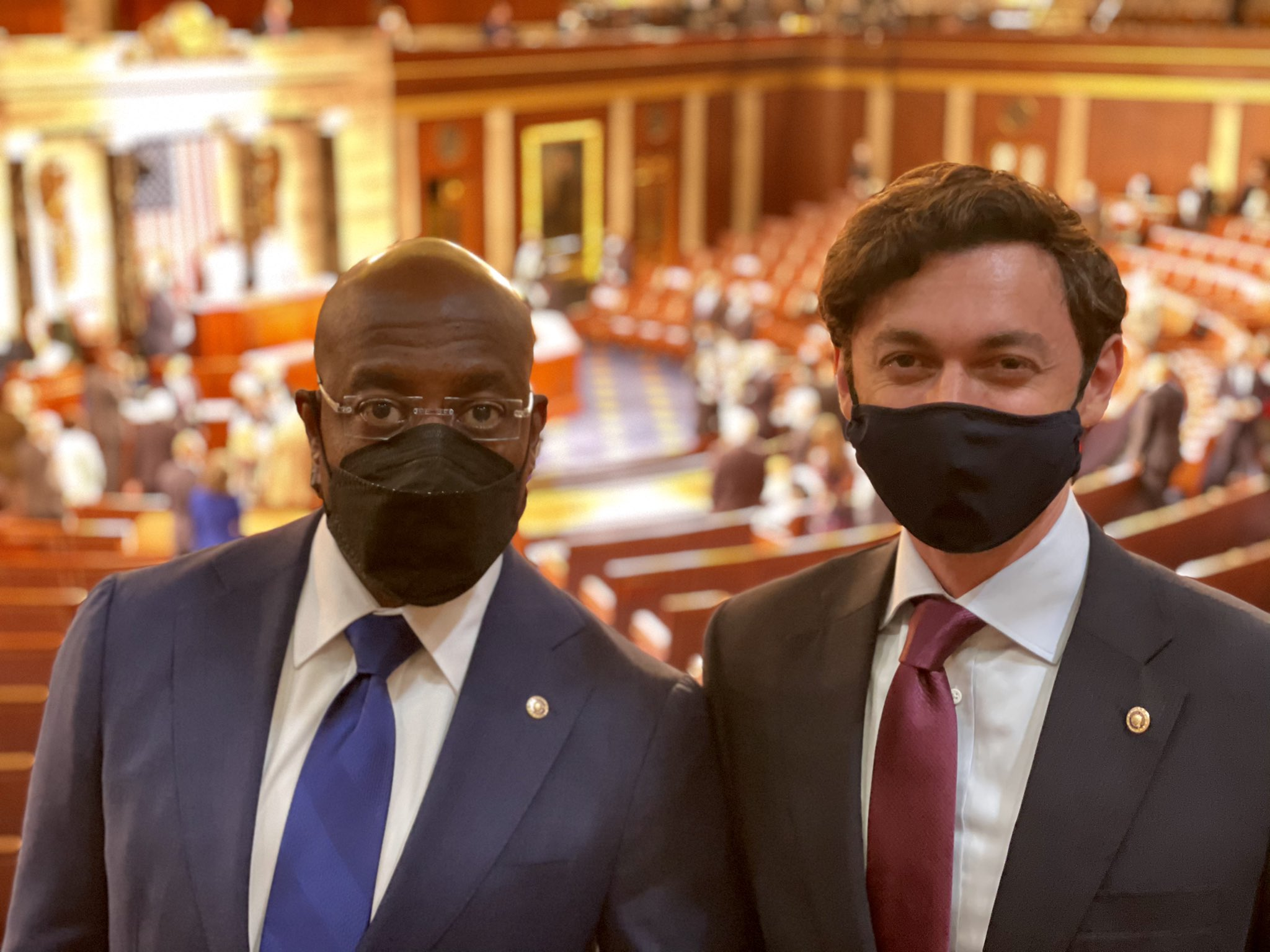
Warnock and Ossoff at the State of the Union in April 2021 after winning their first runoff elections

==== 2022 ====
On January 27, 2021, Warnock announced that he would seek reelection to a full term in 2022.

Since no candidate received a majority of the vote in the general election on November 8, 2022, Warnock faced Walker in a runoff election on December 6, and won, 51.4% to 48.6%. He became the first Georgia Democrat to win reelection to the Senate since Sam Nunn in 1990 and the first Deep South Democrat to win reelection to the Senate since Mary Landrieu of Louisiana in 2008.

=== Tenure ===
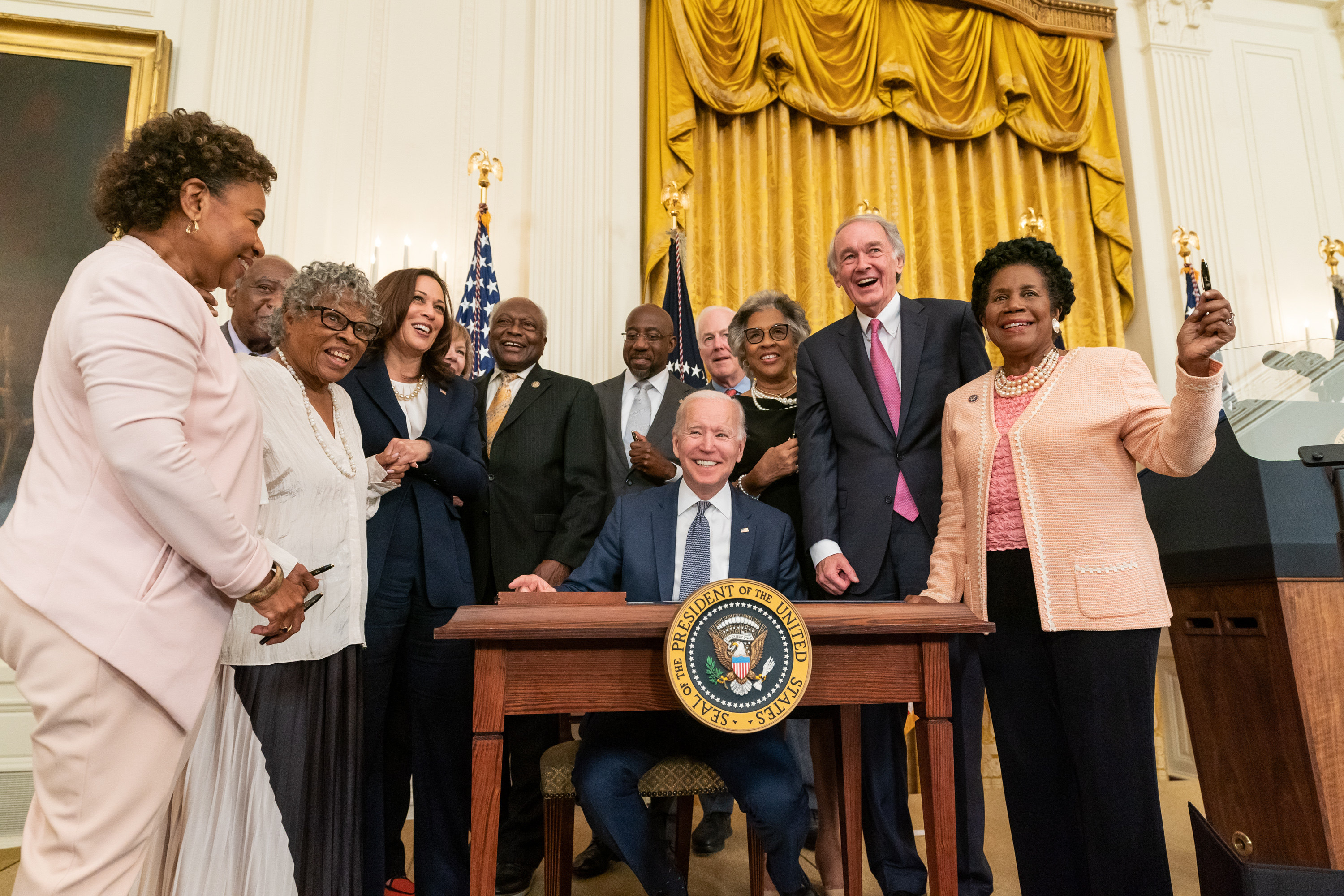
Warnock (grey necktie, behind President Biden) during the signing of Juneteenth National Independence Day Act, June 17, 2021

On January 20, 2021, Warnock was sworn into the United States Senate in the 117th Congress by Vice President Kamala Harris alongside newly elected Senator Jon Ossoff and former California Secretary of State Alex Padilla. Warnock was escorted by Senator Tim Kaine of Virginia.

On February 13, 2021, Warnock voted to convict former president Donald Trump of inciting the January 6 United States Capitol attack.

On March 5, 2021, Warnock and 29 other Democratic and independent senators co-sponsored an amendment to raise the federal minimum wage to $15 an hour.

On March 17, 2021, he delivered his first speech on the Senate floor, in support of the passage of the For the People Act and the John Lewis Voting Rights Act.

In January 2022, when Johnny Isakson, a former U.S. senator from Georgia, died, Warnock introduced a Senate resolution to honor Isakson, which was enacted with bipartisan support. Warnock called Isakson "a patriot, a public servant" who "knew how to show up for people".

In October 2022, a bill by Warnock and Senator Jon Ossoff was enacted into law, naming a United States Post Office building in Atlanta, Georgia after John Lewis, who was a U.S. representative for Atlanta until his death in 2020.

In September 2023, Warnock was the only Democrat on the Senate Banking Committee to vote against the Secure and Fair Enforcement Regulation (SAFER) Banking Act, which provides a safe harbor for legal state-level marijuana dispensaries and growers to access federally regulated banks.

=== Committee assignments ===
Warnock has been assigned to the following committees for the 117th United States Congress:

- Committee on Agriculture, Nutrition, and Forestry
  - Subcommittee on Commodities, Risk Management, and Trade (Chair)
  - Subcommittee on Food and Nutrition, Specialty Crops, Organics, and Research
  - Subcommittee on Livestock, Dairy, Poultry, Local Food Systems, and Food Safety and Security
- Committee on Commerce, Science, and Transportation
  - Subcommittee on Aviation Safety, Operations, and Innovation
  - Subcommittee on Communications, Media, and Broadband
  - Subcommittee on Space and Science
  - Subcommittee on Surface Transportation, Maritime, Freight, and Ports
- Committee on Banking, Housing, and Urban Affairs
  - Subcommittee on Securities, Insurance, and Investment
  - Subcommittee on Housing, Transportation, and Community Development
  - Subcommittee on Financial Institutions and Consumer Protection (Chair)
- Congressional Joint Economic Committee
- Special Committee on Aging

=== Caucuses ===
- Black Maternal Health Caucus
- Congressional Black Caucus
- Rare Disease Caucus

== Political positions ==
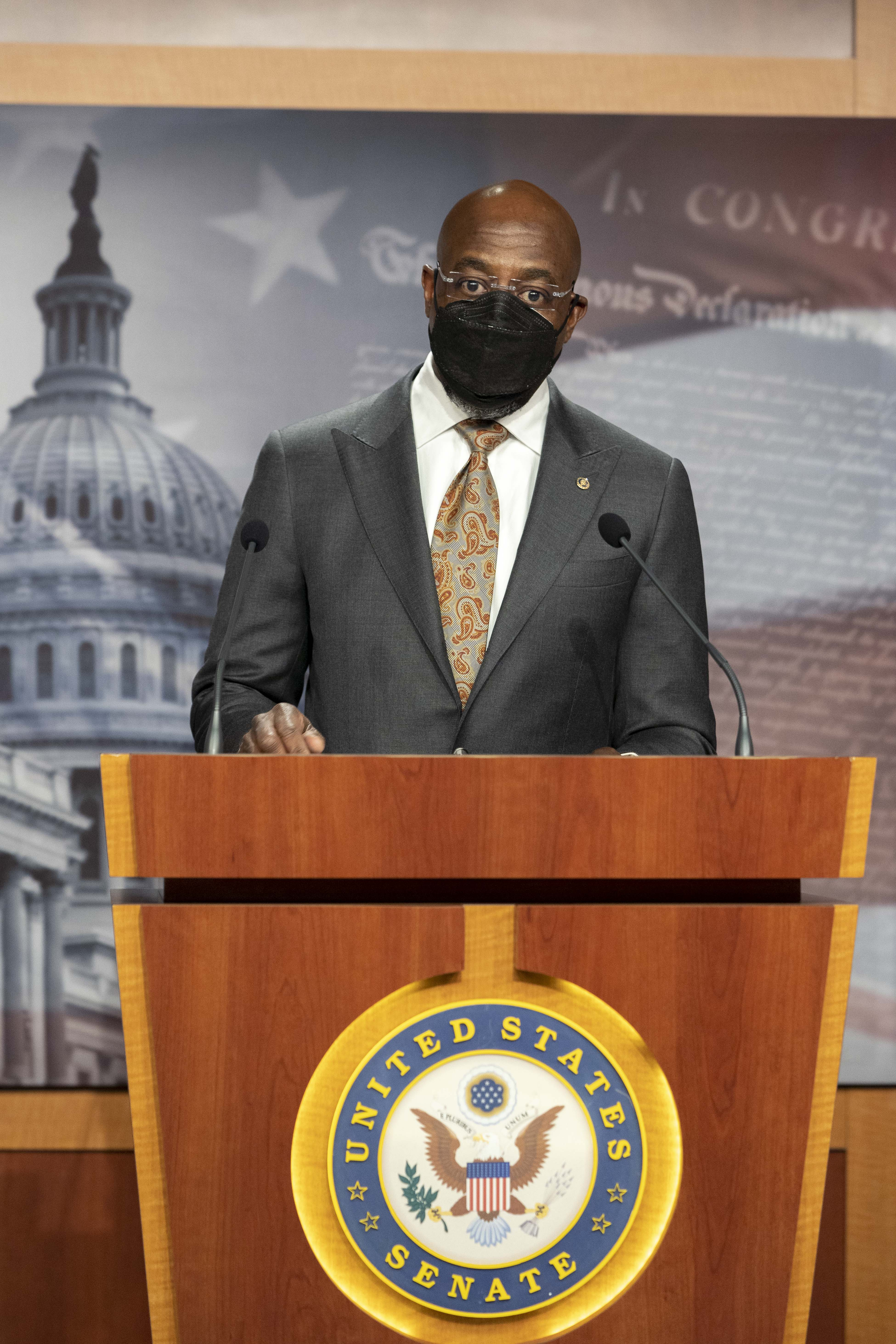
Warnock speaking at a press conference on the COVID-19 relief bill in 2021

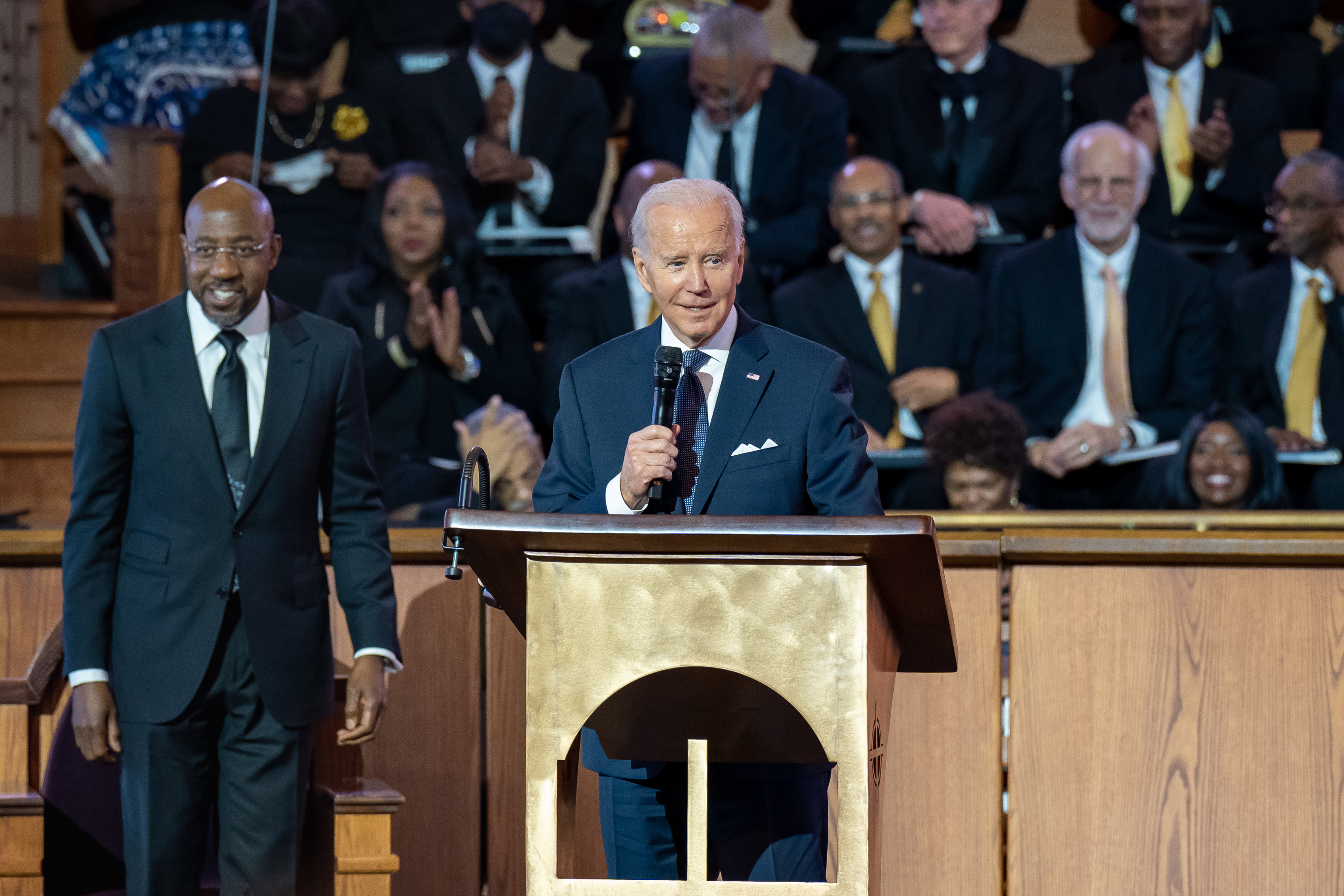
Warnock with President Biden at Ebenezer Baptist Church, 2023

In April 2021, Politico reported that Warnock, as a U.S. senator, had embraced "a progressive agenda". As of December 2022, Warnock had voted in line with President Joe Biden's stated position 96.5% of the time.

According to GovTrack, for Warnock's Senate term from 2021 to 2023, he was ranked "most politically right" of all Senate Democrats in the 117th Congress, and was noted to have joined "bipartisan bills the 2nd most often" of all Senate Democrats in the 117th Congress.

=== Abortion ===
Warnock has described himself as a "pro-choice pastor".

In December 2020, during Warnock's Senate campaign, a group of 25 black ministers wrote him an open letter asking him to reconsider his abortion stance, calling it "contrary to Christian teachings" and saying that abortion disproportionately affects African Americans. The Warnock campaign responded with a statement, writing that "Warnock believes a patient's room is too small a place for a woman, her doctor, and the U.S. government and that these are deeply personal health care decisions – not political ones."

Warnock called the June 2022 overturning of Roe v. Wade "misguided" and "devastating for women and families in Georgia and nationwide."

=== Agriculture ===
Warnock was the main sponsor of S.278 - Emergency Relief for Farmers of Color Act of 2021. The bill would aid historically disaffected minority groups in the agriculture sector. It was introduced alongside Senator Cory Booker's Justice for Black Farmers Act.

Warnock worked with Senator Tommy Tuberville to reduce barriers to trade for peanut exports in order to assist peanut farmers in Georgia.

=== Capital punishment and criminal justice ===
Warnock opposes the death penalty. He unsuccessfully attempted to stop the execution of death-row inmate Troy Davis, who had been convicted of the 1989 murder of police officer Mark MacPhail in Savannah, Georgia.

=== Defense ===
After President Joe Biden recommended in March 2022 that the Air National Guard's Combat Readiness Training Center in Savannah, Georgia, be closed, Warnock was one of several Georgia lawmakers to oppose the move, calling Biden's recommendation "bad for Savannah and bad for our national security"; the Appropriations subcommittee of the House of Representatives rejected the recommendation in June 2022.

Warnock supported the National Defense Authorization Act for Fiscal Year 2022, which provides funding for defense purposes, saying: "Georgia is an important military state ... Fort Stewart will get an upgrade in its energy plant to the tune of $22 million. There is also $100 million in this bill for barracks at Fort Stewart. We have to make sure that those who we ask to serve have what they need in order to serve". The barracks are slated to house over 370 soldiers.

=== Economy and infrastructure ===
Warnock worked together with Senator Ted Cruz to introduce legislation to prioritize the building of Interstate 14, connecting Augusta, Macon, and Columbus in Georgia to Texas; Warnock said the interstate would be "helpful for our military installations" and "the economy in this region". The prioritization was ultimately approved within the Infrastructure Investment and Jobs Act that passed in November 2021, with the interstate slated to also pass through Midland–Odessa, Texas; Alexandria, Louisiana; Laurel, Mississippi; and Montgomery, Alabama.

Warnock has helped to obtain millions in funding for the Port of Savannah and for the new Northeast Georgia Inland Port in Hall County, Georgia.

Warnock supports raising the federal minimum wage to $15 an hour.

=== Environment ===
In 2022, Warnock emphasized the importance of the national climate bill within his campaign. Warnock referenced the contaminated water and air in Black and brown communities, such as the water crises in Jackson, Mississippi, and Flint, Michigan, and the burden placed on low-income families that pay a larger portion of their income on utilities.

After attending a groundbreaking at Hyundai's electric vehicle plant in Savannah, Georgia alongside Governor Brian Kemp, Warnock told reporters that climate policy is a "moral" issue. He said, "I've also put forward a lot of legislation focused on creating a green energy future, everything from electric vehicles to electric batteries being manufactured in the state to investing in solar manufacturing".

Warnock was a cosponsor of the Recycling Infrastructure and Accessibility Act of 2022, a bipartisan bill that "requires the Environmental Protection Agency (EPA) to establish a pilot grant program for improving recycling accessibility in communities".

=== Gun control ===
Warnock received a "F" grade from the NRA Political Victory Fund (NRA-PVF) during his Senate campaign. The NRA accused him of supporting the criminalization of private gun transfers and banning standard-issue magazines, and it endorsed Loeffler. In 2014, Warnock gave a sermon in which he criticized Georgia's gun laws, saying that "somebody decided that they had the bright idea to pass a piece of legislation that would allow guns and concealed weapons to be carried in churches. Have you ever been to a church meeting?... Whoever thought of that had never been to a church meeting."

=== Healthcare ===
In October 2021, Warnock and Ossoff said they had obtained federal funding under the American Rescue Plan Act for health centers across Georgia, including two in Macon and four in Albany, each of which received between $500,000 to $1,100,000. Reacting to this, Warnock affirmed his support for the American Rescue Plan, saying: "We must continue to do all we can to provide support and funding to our health care infrastructure and workers on the front lines of this pandemic."

A bipartisan bill on maternal health by Warnock and Senator Marco Rubio was incorporated into a $1.5 trillion federal spending package that passed Congress in March 2022. Warnock's bill allocated $50 million for integrated healthcare services grants, $45 million to innovation grants, $25 million for training of healthcare workers, and approval of a study on how to teach health professionals to reduce discrimination. Warnock said, "Georgia is dead last when it comes to women and their access to healthcare" and that the bill's aim was "to make sure that when women are trying to bring a child in this world, they don't have to do so with one foot in the grave".

In August 2022, the Senate passed the Inflation Reduction Act, which included two proposals by Warnock: a $2,000 annual limit on prescription drug costs for seniors on Medicare, and a $35 monthly limit on insulin costs for people on Medicare. Republican lawmakers successfully challenged a third proposal by Warnock that would have imposed a $35 monthly limit on out-of-pocket insulin costs for people on private insurance, which was struck from the bill by the Senate Parliamentarian in accordance with the Byrd Rule.

=== Immigration ===
Warnock criticized President Trump's "shithole countries" comment in 2018 and his subsequent signing of a proclamation honoring Martin Luther King Jr., saying, "I would argue that a proclamation without an apology is hypocrisy. There is no redemption without repentance and the president of the United States needs to repent."

Warnock also has supported keeping Title 42 expulsions, saying, "We need assurances that we have security at the border and that we protect communities on this side of the border."

In 2025, Warnock was one of 12 Senate Democrats who joined all Republicans to vote for the Laken Riley Act.

=== LGBTQ rights ===
Warnock was endorsed by the Human Rights Campaign in 2020 and 2022 for his views on LGBTQ rights. He supports the Equality Act, which would prohibit discrimination based on gender identity and sexual orientation. Warnock also supported and cosponsored the Respect for Marriage Act, which would codify same-sex and interracial marriages, but was absent for the final vote due to campaigning.

=== Supreme Court ===
During a December 2020 debate, Warnock twice declined to answer whether he supported "packing the Supreme Court" by adding additional justices.

=== Veterans and military families ===
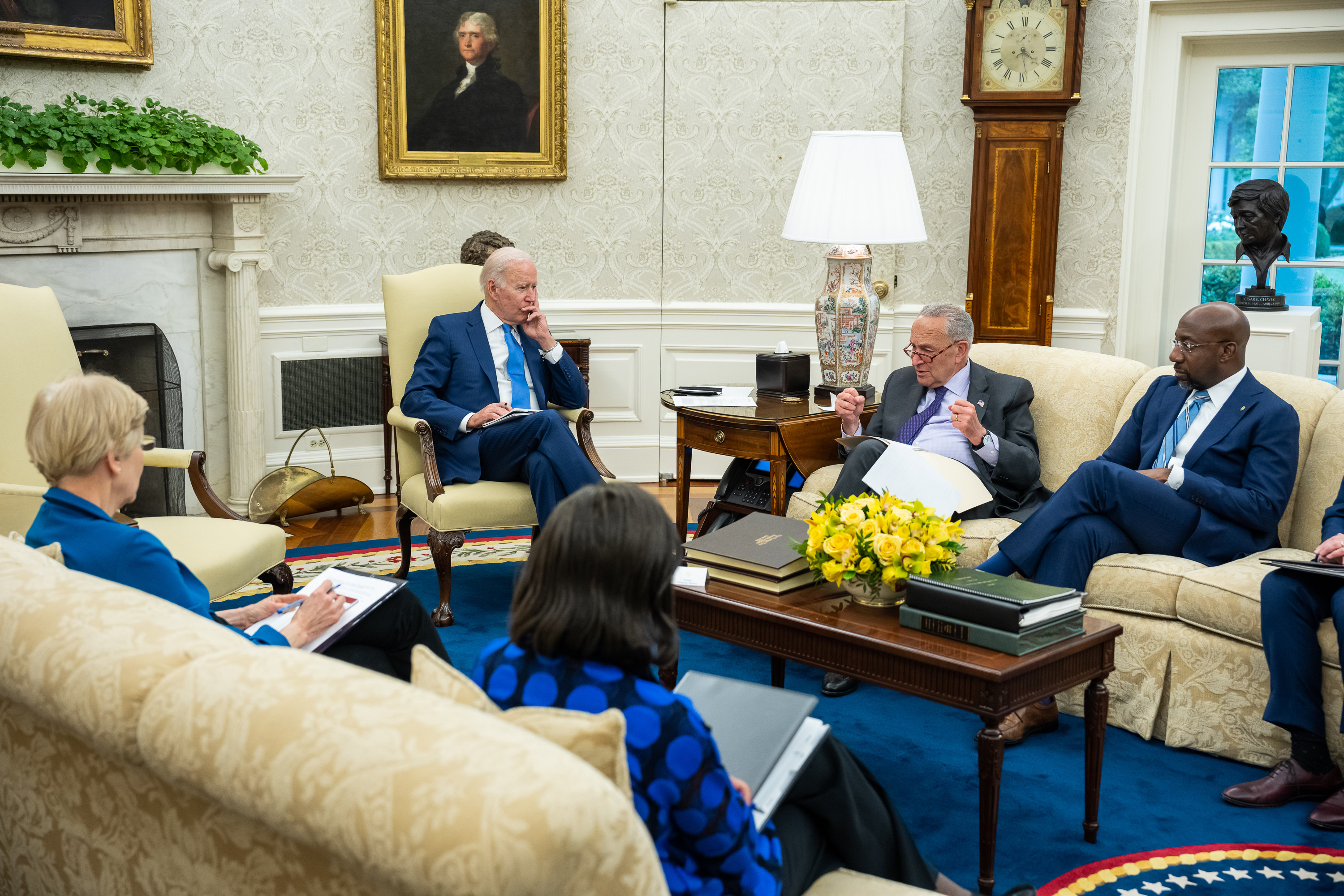
President Biden meeting with U.S. Senators Raphael Warnock, Chuck Schumer, and Elizabeth Warren at the White House in May 2022

In June 2021, Warnock and Ossoff assisted six Georgia organizations that work to reduce veteran homelessness by obtaining between $375,000 to $500,000 of federal funds for each organization, using funds from the Department of Labor's Homeless Veterans' Reintegration Program, which are intended to help the veterans find jobs.

In September 2021, Warnock worked together with Senator Cindy Hyde-Smith to introduce legislation designating September 19 to 25 as Gold Star Families Remembrance Week nationwide, to honor sacrifices made by families of servicemen who died serving the United States; the legislation passed the Senate unanimously.

In November 2021, a bill of Warnock's was enacted that approved a government study into whether there were racial disparities in benefits provided by the United States Department of Veterans Affairs.

=== Voting rights ===
In his maiden speech on the U.S. Senate floor, Warnock said that one of his primary goals upon assuming office was to oppose voting restrictions and support federal voting reforms. He has said that passing legislation to expand voting rights is important enough to end the Senate filibuster.

On March 17, 2021, Warnock said in a Senate floor speech that voting rights were under attack at a rate not seen since the Jim Crow era. On April 20, 2021, Warnock and voting rights activist Stacey Abrams testified before the Senate Judiciary Committee in favor of passing the John Lewis Voting Rights Act and For the People Act. He was again critical of the new election laws passed in his home state, calling it a "full-fledged assault on voting rights, unlike anything we seen since the era of Jim Crow." He has said that he does not oppose voter ID laws, but criticizes them when they discriminate against certain groups.

=== Welfare ===
While he was assistant pastor at Abyssinian Baptist Church, Warnock opposed New York mayor Rudy Giuliani's workfare reforms. In 1997, he told The New York Times, "We are worried that workfare is being used to displace other workers who receive respectable compensation... We are concerned that poor people are being put into competition with other poor people, and in that respect, we think workfare is a hoax".

=== Israeli-Palestinian conflict ===
In a May 2018 sermon, Warnock criticized Israel's alleged shooting of nonviolent Palestinian protesters, comparing the Palestinian cause to the Black Lives Matter movement. He emphasized the struggle for human dignity and Palestinians' right to self-determination, while also advocating a two-state solution where "all of God's children can live together". In 2019, after a visit to Israel and the West Bank, Warnock signed a statement with other clergy that was critical of Israel's military occupation and settlement expansion in the West Bank. This statement compared the West Bank's heavy militarization to apartheid South Africa's occupation of Namibia, highlighting concerns about the viability of a two-state solution given these conditions.

Warnock reversed course on some of these positions during his Senate campaign in November 2020, calling the Boycott, Divestment, Sanctions (BDS) movement against Israel "anti-Semitic" and a refusal to acknowledge Israel's right to exist. He has said that he does not believe that Israel is an apartheid state and that he recognizes Israel's significance as a democracy in the Middle East and its importance as America's partner in the region. Warnock has also expressed a commitment to working toward ensuring Iran does not obtain a nuclear weapon and has voiced his opposition to conditioning U.S. assistance to Israel.

In October 2023, Warnock publicly condemned Hamas's acts of violence against Israel at the start of Gaza war. In a statement, he called the violence "heinous" and emphasized the importance of seeking a "lasting peace grounded in justice and human dignity for all of God's creatures." Warnock later delivered a Senate speech emphasizing American leadership in achieving Israeli-Palestinian peace. He called for a negotiated ceasefire in the Gaza war, the release of hostages, and opening humanitarian corridors to aid Gaza, and he underscored the need for a two-state solution based on peace, security, and self-determination for both peoples. Warnock was one of 19 Democratic senators to sign a letter to the Biden administration urging the United States to recognize a "nonmilitarized" Palestinian state after the war in Gaza.

In November 2024, Warnock voted for all three Israel-related measures proposed by Bernie Sanders: to block sales to Israel of JDAMS, tank rounds, and mortar rounds. The measures would have blocked approximately $20 billion in U.S. arms sales to Israel. In April 2025, Warnock voted against a pair of resolutions sponsored by Sanders to withhold billions of dollars in offensive weapons sales and other military aid to Israel. That summer, during the Gaza Strip famine, Warnock reversed his position and voted for a pair of similar Sanders-led resolutions on withholding military aid to Israel.

== Personal life ==
Warnock lives in Atlanta. He married Oulèye Ndoye in a public ceremony on February 14, 2016; the couple had held a private ceremony in January. They have two children. The couple separated in November 2019, and their divorce was finalized in 2020.

In March 2020, when Warnock and Ndoye were going through divorce proceedings, Ndoye accused Warnock of running over her foot with his car during a verbal argument; Warnock denied the accusation. According to an Atlanta Police Department report, after Warnock called police to the scene, Ndoye was reluctant to show her foot to the responding police officer, who "did not see any signs that Ms. Ouleye's foot was ran [sic] over"; medical professionals then arrived at the scene, but were "not able to locate any swelling, redness, or bruising or broken bones" on Ndoye's foot. Police did not charge Warnock with any crimes regarding the incident.

In February 2022, Ndoye asked the court to modify their child custody agreement, granting her "additional custody of their two young children so she can complete a Harvard University program", and for a recalculation of child support payments.

In October 2022, Savannah's city government honorarily renamed Cape Street, the street on which Warnock grew up during the 1980s, as Raphael Warnock Way.

== Electoral history ==
2020–21 United States Senate special election in Georgia
Party	Candidate	Votes	%
Democratic	Raphael Warnock	1,617,035	32.90
Republican	Kelly Loeffler (incumbent)	1,273,214	25.91
Republican	Doug Collins	980,454	19.95
Democratic	Deborah Jackson	324,118	6.60
Democratic	Matt Lieberman	136,021	2.77
Democratic	Tamara Johnson-Shealey	106,767	2.17
Democratic	Jamesia James	94,406	1.92
Republican	Derrick Grayson	51,592	1.05
Democratic	Joy Felicia Slade	44,945	0.91
Republican	Annette Davis Jackson	44,335	0.90
Republican	Kandiss Taylor	40,349	0.82
Republican	Wayne Johnson (withdrawn)	36,176	0.74
Libertarian	Brian Slowinski	35,431	0.72
Democratic	Richard Dien Winfield	28,687	0.58
Democratic	Ed Tarver	26,333	0.54
Independent	Allen Buckley	17,954	0.37
Green	John Fortuin	15,293	0.31
Independent	Al Bartell	14,640	0.30
Independent	Valencia Stovall	13,318	0.27
Independent	Michael Todd Greene	13,293	0.27
Total votes		4,914,361	100.0

2021 United States Senate special election in Georgia runoff
Party	Candidate	Votes	%	±%
Democratic	Raphael Warnock	2,289,113	51.04%	+10.00%
Republican	Kelly Loeffler (incumbent)	2,195,841	48.96%	−5.84%
Total votes		4,484,954	100.0%	
Democratic gain from Republican				

2022 United States Senate election in Georgia
Party	Candidate	Votes	%	±%
Democratic	Raphael Warnock (incumbent)	1,946,117	49.44%	+1.05%
Republican	Herschel Walker	1,908,442	48.49%	−0.88%
Libertarian	Chase Oliver	81,365	2.07%	+1.35%
Total votes		3,935,924	100.0%	

2022 United States Senate election in Georgia runoff
Party	Candidate	Votes	%	±%
Democratic	Raphael Warnock (incumbent)	1,820,633	51.40%	+0.36%
Republican	Herschel Walker	1,721,244	48.60%	−0.36%
Total votes		3,541,877	100.0%	
Democratic hold				

== Publications ==
External videos
- After Words interview with Warnock on A Way Out of No Way, June 26, 2022, C-SPAN

=== Books ===
- Warnock, Raphael G. (December 2013). The Divided Mind of the Black Church: Theology, Piety, and Public Witness. New York: NYU Press. ISBN 9780814794463. OCLC 844308880.
- Warnock, Raphael G. (June 2022). A Way Out of No Way. New York: Penguin Press. ISBN 9780593491546. OCLC 1281244406.
- Warnock, Raphael G. (January 2023). Put Your Shoes On & Get Ready!. New York: Penguin Random House. ISBN 9780593528877. OCLC 1356411136.
- Warnock, Raphael G. (April 2025). We're in This Together: Leo's Lunch Box. New York: Penguin Random House. ISBN 9780593691526. OCLC 1484705406.

=== Articles ===
- "I Can Still Hear My Father's Voice", New York Times, June 15, 2022

== See also ==
- List of African-American firsts
- List of African-American United States senators
- List of African-American United States Senate candidates
- List of Christian clergy in politics
- List of American politicians with religious occupations

== Notes ==
Party political offices
Preceded by Jim Barksdale	Democratic nominee for U.S. Senator from Georgia (Class 3); 2020, 2022	Most recent
U.S. Senate
Preceded by Kelly Loeffler	U.S. Senator (Class 3) from Georgia; 2021–present Served alongside: Jon Ossoff	Incumbent
U.S. order of precedence (ceremonial)
Preceded by Jon Ossoff	Order of precedence of the United States as United States Senator	Succeeded by Alex Padilla
Preceded by Jon Ossoff	United States senators by seniority 78th	Succeeded by Peter Welch
