= List of Muslim members of the United States Congress =

This is a list of Muslim members of the United States Congress.

As of 2026, six Muslims have served in the United States Congress, the first being Keith Ellison, who was elected in 2006. As of the 119th Congress, five Muslims currently serve in Congress, all in the House of Representatives; all are members of the Democratic Party.

In the 2026 midterm elections, a record seven Muslims, including three newly elected members, were elected to Congress and will be sworn in when the 120th Congress convenes in January 2027. All are Democrats. Among them is Abdul El-Sayed, who will become the first Muslim senator.

== Senate ==
In the 2026 United States Senate election in Michigan, Democrat Abdul El-Sayed defeated Republican Mike Rogers, becoming the first Muslim elected to the Senate. He is expected to take office on January 3, 2027, becoming the first Muslim to serve in the chamber.

Mehmet Oz was nominated by the Republican Party in the 2022 United States Senate election in Pennsylvania, becoming the first Muslim nominated by a major political party for the U.S. Senate, but was defeated by Democrat John Fetterman.

Senator	Party	State	Term			Notes
Senator	Party	State	Start	End	Length of service	Notes
Abdul El-Sayed	Democratic	Michigan	January 3, 2027	Senator-elect (not yet seated)		First Muslim elected to the Senate.

== House of Representatives ==
In addition to the representatives below, former representative Hansen Clarke (D-MI-13) of Michigan was raised in a Muslim family but converted to Catholicism. Current representatives Abraham Hamadeh (R-AZ-08) of Arizona, who identifies as religiously unaffiliated, and Yassamin Ansari (D-AZ-03) of Arizona, who identifies as agnostic, were raised in Muslim families.

Representative	Party	District	Term			Notes
Representative	Party	District	Start	End	Length of service	Notes
Keith Ellison	Democratic	MN-05	January 3, 2007	January 3, 2019	12 years, 0 days	First Muslim in Congress. Converted to Islam from Catholicism in 1982. Retired to run successfully for Minnesota Attorney General.
André Carson	Democratic	IN-07	March 11, 2008	Incumbent	18 years, 254 days	Raised Baptist, converted to Islam as a teenager.
Ilhan Omar	Democratic	MN-05	January 3, 2019	Incumbent	7 years, 321 days	One of the first two Muslim women in Congress. First Muslim to succeed another Muslim. Born to a Muslim family in Somalia and immigrated as a refugee to the United States in 1995.
Rashida Tlaib	Democratic	MI-13, MI-12	January 3, 2019	Incumbent	7 years, 321 days	One of the first two Muslim women in Congress. Born to a Muslim family of Palestinian immigrants. First Muslim Congressmember from Michigan.
Lateefah Simon	Democratic	CA-12	January 3, 2025	Incumbent	1 year, 321 days	First Muslim elected to Congress from outside of the Midwestern United States.
Aisha Wahab	Democratic	CA-14	September 2, 2026	Incumbent	79 days	Born in Queens, New York to a Muslim family of Afghan refugees. Following the death of her parents, she was adopted by an Afghan American couple in Fremont, California.

=== Representatives-elect ===
Representative	Party	District	Term			Notes
Representative	Party	District	Start	End	Length of service	Notes
Darializa Avila Chevalier	Democratic	NY-13	January 3, 2027			Convert to Islam. First Muslim Congressmember from New York.
Adam Hamawy	Democratic	NJ-12	January 3, 2027			First Muslim Congressmember from New Jersey.

== See also ==
- List of Buddhist members of the United States Congress
- List of Hindu members of the United States Congress
- List of Jewish members of the United States Congress
- List of Mormon members of the United States Congress
- List of Quaker members of the United States Congress
- List of Arab and Middle Eastern Americans in the United States Congress
