= Latter Day Saint political history =

This is a chronological listing of significant events surrounding Latter Day Saints seeking or winning political office. It refers primarily to members of the Church of Jesus Christ of Latter-day Saints (LDS Church), but also some members of other Latter Day Saint movement religions, such as Church of Jesus Christ of Latter Day Saints (Strangite), Community of Christ, formerly the Reorganized Church of Jesus Christ of Latter Day Saints (RLDS). In addition to listing events chronologically, political firsts are noted. This list is very incomplete.

- 1838

John Corrill elected to the Missouri House of Representatives.

This was the first Latter Day Saint elected to a state office in any state.

- 1841

William B. Smith elected to the Illinois House of Representatives.

This was the first Latter Day Saint elected to a state office in Illinois.
This was the first time a member of the Smith Family was elected to office.

- 1842

Joseph Smith elected Mayor of Nauvoo.

- 1844

Joseph Smith declares himself a candidate for President of the United States. He is assassinated during his campaign.

This was the first Latter Day Saint to run for president.
This was the first Latter Day Saint assassinated in office (as Mayor of Nauvoo).

- 1850

Brigham Young is appointed Governor of Utah Territory.
This is the first Latter Day Saint to hold a U.S. governorship.

- 1853

Jefferson Hunt is elected to the California State Assembly.

This is the first Latter Day Saint elected to state office in California.

James J. Strang is elected to the Michigan Legislature.

This is the first Latter Day Saint elected to state office in Michigan.

- 1855

James J. Strang is reelected to the Michigan Legislature.

- 1858

Brigham Young removed from office as Governor of Utah.

- 1896

Utah gains statehood.

Martha Hughes Cannon first woman elected to any state senate in U.S. history (Utah).
Heber Manning Wells elected Utah Governor.

This is the first Latter Day Saint to be Utah governor since Brigham Young.
This is the first Latter Day Saint to be elected governor of any state.

Frank J. Cannon elected U.S. Senator from Utah

First Latter-day Saint elected to the Senate. (Cannon later left the LDS Church and became a bitter anti-Mormon.)

- 1902

Reed Smoot elected to the U.S. Senate in Utah.

First LDS Church General Authority elected to the Senate.

- 1911

Israel A. Smith elected to the Iowa State Legislature.

First direct descendant of Latter Day Saint movement founder Joseph Smith to be elected to political office.

- 1922

George Sutherland appointed to the U.S. Supreme Court.

- 1928

J. Reuben Clark appointed U.S. Undersecretary of State.

- 1930

J. Reuben Clark appointed U.S. Ambassador to Mexico.

- 1940

Berkeley Bunker appointed U.S. Senator from Nevada.

First Latter Day Saint to hold national office from Nevada.
First Latter Day Saint U.S. Senator from outside Utah.

- 1944

Berkeley Bunker elected to U.S. House of Representatives from Nevada.

- 1953

Ezra Taft Benson appointed U.S. Secretary of Agriculture.
Ivy Baker Priest appointed U.S. Treasurer.

- 1961

Stewart Udall appointed U.S. Secretary of the Interior.

- 1962

George W. Romney elected Governor of Michigan.

- 1968

George W. Romney declares candidacy for President of the United States (as Republican).

First Latter Day Saint to run for a major party's presidential nomination.

- 1969

David Matthew Kennedy appointed U.S. Secretary of Treasury.
George W. Romney appointed U.S. Secretary of Housing and Urban Development.

- 1976

Mo Udall declares candidacy for President of the United States (as Democrat).

- 1980

Paula Hawkins elected to U.S. Senate from Florida.

- 1981

Terrel Bell appointed U.S. Secretary of Education.

- 1982

Bay Buchanan baptized into LDS Church as sitting U.S. Treasurer.
Harry Reid wins election as a representative from Nevada.

- 1985

Jake Garn becomes first sitting U.S. Senator to fly in space.

- 1986

Harry Reid wins election as a Senator from Nevada.

- 1988

Evan Mecham impeached and removed from office as Governor of Arizona

- 1999

Three members of the Udall family serve in Congress simultaneously. Two are Latter-day Saint.

- 2000

Orrin Hatch declares candidacy for President of the United States (as Republican).

- 2002

Mitt Romney elected Governor of Massachusetts.

- 2004

Harry Reid becomes the Democratic Leader of the United States Senate, and the Senate Minority leader

- 2005

Michael O. Leavitt appointed U.S. Secretary of Health and Human Services.

- 2007

Harry Reid becomes Senate Majority Leader
Mitt Romney announces his candidacy for the U.S. presidency.

- 2011

Mitt Romney announces his candidacy for the U.S. presidency.

First Latter Day Saint to receive a major party's presidential nomination.

Jon Huntsman, Jr. announces his candidacy for the U.S. presidency.

- 2016

Evan McMullin announces his candidacy for U.S. presidency.

== See also ==
- List of Mormon members of the United States Congress
