= List of Mormon members of the United States Congress =

This is a list of Mormons, or members of the Church of Jesus Christ of Latter-day Saints (LDS Church), who are serving, or have served, in the United States Congress.

Since Utah's admittance to the Union in 1896, many members of the LDS Church have been elected to the United States Congress. A majority have been from Utah (the only state with an LDS Church majority), and most of the rest from other states in the American West.

As of 2025, there are nine LDS Church members serving in Congress; three in the Senate and six in the House of Representatives. All nine are members of the Republican Party.

== Senate ==
In addition to the senators below, former Senator Larry Pressler (R) of South Dakota joined the LDS Church after his service in Congress. Senator Kyrsten Sinema (I) of Arizona grew up in the LDS Church, but left after graduating from Brigham Young University. Senator Marco Rubio (R) of Florida was baptized as a child while living in Nevada but left the church after his family moved back to Florida.

Senator	Party	State	Term			Notes
Senator	Party	State	Start	End	Length of service	Notes
Frank J. Cannon	Republican	Utah	January 22, 1896	March 4, 1899	3 years, 41 days	
Reed Smoot	Republican	Utah	March 4, 1903	March 4, 1933	30 years, 0 days	Also served on the Quorum of the Twelve Apostles.
William H. King	Democratic	Utah	March 4, 1917	January 3, 1941	23 years, 305 days	
Elbert D. Thomas	Democratic	Utah	March 4, 1933	January 3, 1951	17 years, 305 days	
Berkeley L. Bunker	Democratic	Nevada	November 27, 1940	December 2, 1942	2 years, 5 days	
Orrice Abram Murdock Jr.	Democratic	Utah	January 3, 1941	January 3, 1947	6 years, 0 days	
Arthur Vivian Watkins	Republican	Utah	January 3, 1947	January 3, 1959	12 years, 0 days	
Wallace F. Bennett	Republican	Utah	January 3, 1951	December 20, 1974	23 years, 351 days	
Howard Cannon	Democratic	Nevada	January 3, 1959	January 3, 1983	24 years, 0 days	
Frank Moss	Democratic	Utah	January 3, 1959	January 3, 1977	18 years, 0 days	
Jake Garn	Republican	Utah	December 21, 1974	January 3, 1993	18 years, 13 days	
Orrin Hatch	Republican	Utah	January 3, 1977	January 3, 2019	42 years, 0 days	
Paula Hawkins	Republican	Florida	January 1, 1981	January 3, 1987	6 years, 2 days	First Mormon woman and first Mormon from east of the Mississippi River to serve in Congress.
Harry Reid	Democratic	Nevada	January 3, 1987	January 3, 2017	30 years, 0 days	First Mormon convert to serve in the Senate.
Bob Bennett	Republican	Utah	January 3, 1993	January 3, 2011	18 years, 0 days	
Gordon H. Smith	Republican	Oregon	January 3, 1997	January 3, 2009	12 years, 0 days	
Mike Crapo	Republican	Idaho	January 3, 1999	Incumbent	27 years, 311 days	
Tom Udall	Democratic	New Mexico	January 3, 2009	January 3, 2021	12 years, 0 days	
Mike Lee	Republican	Utah	January 3, 2011	Incumbent	15 years, 311 days	
Dean Heller	Republican	Nevada	May 9, 2011	January 3, 2019	7 years, 239 days	
Jeff Flake	Republican	Arizona	January 3, 2013	January 3, 2019	6 years, 0 days	
Mitt Romney	Republican	Utah	January 3, 2019	January 3, 2025	6 years, 0 days	Ran unsuccessfully for president in 2008 and 2012. Retired
John Curtis	Republican	Utah	January 3, 2025	Incumbent	1 year, 311 days	

== House of Representatives ==
In addition to the representatives below, former Representative Jim Gibbons (R) of Nevada and Senator Kyrsten Sinema (I) of Arizona grew up in the Church, but left as adults.

Representative	Party	District	Term			Notes
Representative	Party	District	Start	End	Length of service	Notes
William H. King	Democratic	UT-AL	March 4, 1897	March 3, 1899	1 year, 364 days	Ran successfully for U.S. Senator from Utah.
William H. King	Democratic	UT-AL	April 2, 1900	March 3, 1901	335 days	Ran successfully for U.S. Senator from Utah.
Joseph Howell	Republican	UT-AL	March 4, 1903	March 3, 1913	13 years, 364 days	
Joseph Howell	Republican	UT-01	March 3, 1913	March 3, 1917	13 years, 364 days	
Milton H. Welling	Democratic	UT-01	March 4, 1917	March 3, 1921	3 years, 364 days	
Don B. Colton	Republican	UT-01	March 4, 1921	March 3, 1933	11 years, 364 days	
Orrice Abram Murdock Jr.	Democratic	UT-01	March 4, 1933	January 3, 1941	7 years, 305 days	Ran successfully for U.S. Senator from Utah.
J. W. Robinson	Democratic	UT-02	March 4, 1933	January 3, 1941	7 years, 305 days	
Walter K. Granger	Democratic	UT-01	January 3, 1941	January 3, 1953	12 years, 0 days	
Berkeley L. Bunker	Democratic	NV-AL	January 5, 1945	January 5, 1947	2 years, 0 days	Appointed U.S. Senator from Nevada.
William A. Dawson	Republican	UT-02	January 3, 1947	January 3, 1949	2 years, 0 days	
William A. Dawson	Republican	UT-02	January 3, 1953	January 3, 1959	6 years, 0 days	
Hamer Budge	Republican	ID-02	January 3, 1951	January 3, 1961	10 years, 0 days	Appointed 16th chairman of the Securities and Exchange Commission.
John E. Moss	Democratic	CA-03	January 3, 1953	December 31, 1978	25 years, 362 days	
Douglas R. Stringfellow	Republican	UT-01	January 3, 1953	January 3, 1955	2 years, 0 days	
Henry Aldous Dixon	Republican	UT-01	January 3, 1955	January 3, 1961	6 years, 0 days	
Stewart Udall	Democratic	AZ-02	January 3, 1955	January 18, 1961	6 years, 15 days	Appointed 37th United States Secretary of the Interior.
David S. King	Democratic	UT-02	January 3, 1959	January 3, 1963	4 years, 0 days	
David S. King	Democratic	UT-02	January 3, 1965	January 3, 1967	2 years, 0 days	
Ralph R. Harding	Democratic	ID-02	January 3, 1961	January 3, 1965	4 years, 0 days	
M. Blaine Peterson	Democratic	UT-01	January 3, 1961	January 3, 1963	2 years, 0 days	
Mo Udall	Democratic	AZ-02	May 2, 1961	May 4, 1991	30 years, 2 days	Ran unsuccessfully for president in 1976.
Laurence J. Burton	Republican	UT-01	January 3, 1963	January 3, 1971	8 years, 0 days	
Richard T. Hanna	Democratic	CA-34	January 3, 1963	December 31, 1974	11 years, 362 days	
Sherman P. Lloyd	Republican	UT-02	January 3, 1963	January 3, 1965	2 years, 0 days	
Sherman P. Lloyd	Republican	UT-02	January 3, 1967	January 3, 1973	6 years, 0 days	
Del M. Clawson	Republican	CA-23	June 11, 1963	January 3, 1975	15 years, 203 days	
Del M. Clawson	Republican	CA-33	January 3, 1975	December 31, 1978	15 years, 203 days	
Kenneth W. Dyal	Democratic	CA-33	January 3, 1965	January 3, 1967	2 years, 0 days	
George V. Hansen	Republican	ID-02	January 3, 1965	January 3, 1969	4 years, 0 days	
George V. Hansen	Republican	ID-02	January 3, 1975	January 3, 1985	10 years, 0 days	
Orval H. Hansen	Republican	ID-02	January 3, 1969	January 3, 1975	6 years, 0 days	
K. Gunn McKay	Democratic	UT-01	January 3, 1971	January 3, 1981	10 years, 0 days	
Wayne Owens	Democratic	UT-02	January 3, 1973	January 3, 1975	2 years, 0 days	
Wayne Owens	Democratic	UT-02	January 3, 1987	January 3, 1993	6 years, 0 days	
Clair Burgener	Republican	CA-42	January 3, 1973	January 3, 1975	10 years, 0 days	
Clair Burgener	Republican	CA-43	January 3, 1975	January 3, 1983	10 years, 0 days	
Allan Turner Howe	Democratic	UT-02	January 3, 1975	January 3, 1977	2 years, 0 days	
Cecil Heftel	Democratic	HI-01	January 3, 1977	July 11, 1986	11 years, 189 days	
David Daniel Marriott	Republican	UT-02	January 3, 1977	January 3, 1985	8 years, 0 days	
Norman D. Shumway	Republican	CA-14	January 3, 1979	January 3, 1991	12 years, 0 days	
James V. Hansen	Republican	UT-01	January 3, 1981	January 3, 2003	22 years, 0 days	
Howard C. Nielson	Republican	UT-03	January 3, 1983	January 3, 1991	8 years, 0 days	
Ron Packard	Republican	CA-43	January 3, 1983	January 3, 1993	18 years, 0 days	
Ron Packard	Republican	CA-48	January 3, 1993	January 3, 2001	18 years, 0 days	
Harry Reid	Democratic	NV-01	January 3, 1983	January 3, 1987	4 years, 0 days	Ran successfully for U.S. Senator from Nevada.
David Smith Monson	Republican	UT-02	January 3, 1985	January 3, 1987	2 years, 0 days	
Richard H. Stallings	Democratic	ID-02	January 3, 1985	January 3, 1993	8 years, 0 days	
Wally Herger	Republican	CA-02	January 3, 1987	January 3, 2013	26 years, 0 days	
John Doolittle	Republican	CA-14	January 3, 1991	January 3, 1993	18 years, 0 days	
John Doolittle	Republican	CA-04	January 3, 1993	January 3, 2009	18 years, 0 days	
Bill Orton	Democratic	UT-03	January 3, 1991	January 3, 1997	6 years, 0 days	
Richard Swett	Democratic	NH-02	January 3, 1991	January 3, 1995	4 years, 0 days	First Mormon elected to the House from a state east of the Mississippi River.
Mike Crapo	Republican	ID-02	January 3, 1993	January 3, 1999	6 years, 0 days	Ran successfully for U.S. Senator from Idaho.
Ernest Istook	Republican	OK-05	January 3, 1993	January 3, 2007	14 years, 0 days	
Buck McKeon	Republican	CA-25	January 3, 1993	January 3, 2015	22 years, 0 days	
Enid Greene Mickelsen	Republican	UT-02	January 3, 1995	January 3, 1997	2 years, 0 days	First Mormon woman to serve in the House.
Matt Salmon	Republican	AZ-01	January 3, 1995	January 3, 2001	6 years, 0 days	
Matt Salmon	Republican	AZ-05	January 3, 2013	January 3, 2017	4 years, 0 days	
Chris Cannon	Republican	UT-03	January 3, 1997	January 3, 2009	12 years, 0 days	
Merrill Cook	Republican	UT-02	January 3, 1997	January 3, 2001	4 years, 0 days	
Mike Simpson	Republican	ID-02	January 3, 1999	Incumbent	27 years, 311 days	
Tom Udall	Democratic	NM-03	January 3, 1999	January 3, 2009	10 years, 0 days	Ran successfully for U.S. Senator from New Mexico.
Jeff Flake	Republican	AZ-01	January 3, 2001	January 3, 2003	12 years, 0 days	Ran successfully for U.S. Senator from Arizona.
Jeff Flake	Republican	AZ-06	January 3, 2003	January 3, 2013	12 years, 0 days	Ran successfully for U.S. Senator from Arizona.
Jim Matheson	Democratic	UT-02	January 3, 2001	January 3, 2013	14 years, 0 days	
Jim Matheson	Democratic	UT-04	January 3, 2013	January 3, 2015	14 years, 0 days	
Rob Bishop	Republican	UT-01	January 3, 2003	January 3, 2021	18 years, 0 days	
Dean Heller	Republican	NV-02	January 3, 2007	May 9, 2011	4 years, 126 days	Ran successfully for U.S. Senator from Nevada.
Jason Chaffetz	Republican	UT-03	January 3, 2009	June 30, 2017	8 years, 178 days	
Raúl Labrador	Republican	ID-01	January 3, 2011	January 3, 2019	8 years, 0 days	First Hispanic Mormon to serve in Congress.
Chris Stewart	Republican	UT-02	January 3, 2013	September 15, 2023	10 years, 255 days	
Curt Clawson	Republican	FL-19	June 24, 2014	January 3, 2017	2 years, 193 days	
Cresent Hardy	Republican	NV-04	January 3, 2015	January 3, 2017	2 years, 0 days	
Mia Love	Republican	UT-04	January 3, 2015	January 3, 2019	4 years, 0 days	First black Mormon to serve in Congress.
Andy Biggs	Republican	AZ-05	January 3, 2017	Incumbent	9 years, 311 days	
John Curtis	Republican	UT-03	November 13, 2017	January 3, 2025	7 years, 51 days	Ran successfully for U.S. Senator from Utah.
Ben McAdams	Democratic	UT-04	January 3, 2019	January 3, 2021	2 years, 0 days	
Ben McAdams	Democratic	UT-01	Representative-elect	Representative-elect		
Blake Moore	Republican	UT-01	January 3, 2021	Incumbent	5 years, 311 days	
Burgess Owens	Republican	UT-04	January 3, 2021	Incumbent	5 years, 311 days	First black male Mormon to serve in Congress.
Celeste Maloy	Republican	UT-02	November 28, 2023	Incumbent	4 years, 347 days	
Mike Kennedy	Republican	UT-03	January 3, 2025	Incumbent	1 year, 311 days	

=== Members-elect ===
Representative	Party	District	Start Date
Mark Lamb	Republican	AZ-05	January 3, 2027

=== Territorial delegates ===
Delegate	Party	District	Term			Notes
Delegate	Party	District	Start	End	Length of service	Notes
John Milton Bernhisel	Independent	Utah Territory	March 4, 1851	March 3, 1859	7 years, 364 days	
William Henry Hooper	Democratic	Utah Territory	March 4, 1859	March 3, 1861	1 year, 364 days	
George Q. Cannon	Republican	Utah Territory	March 4, 1873	February 25, 1882	8 years, 358 days	Also served on the Quorum of the Twelve Apostles and as First Counselor in the First Presidency.
John Thomas Caine	Democratic	Utah Territory	November 7, 1882	March 3, 1893	10 years, 116 days	
Frank J. Cannon	Republican	Utah Territory	March 4, 1895	January 4, 1896	306 days	
Eni Faleomavaega	Democratic	American Samoa	January 3, 1989	January 3, 2015	26 years, 0 days	

=== Elected to the House of Representatives, but not seated ===
Representative	Party	District	Year elected	Notes
B. H. Roberts	Democratic	UT-AL	1898	Not seated due to his practice of polygamy

== See also ==
- Latter Day Saint political history
- List of Latter Day Saints
- List of Buddhist members of the United States Congress
- List of Hindu members of the United States Congress
- List of Jewish members of the United States Congress
- List of Muslim members of the United States Congress
- List of Quaker members of the United States Congress
