= List of Buddhist members of the United States Congress =

This is a list of Buddhist members of the United States Congress.

As of 2025, four Buddhists have been elected to Congress, the first being both Mazie Hirono and Hank Johnson in 2007. As of the 119th Congress, three Buddhists currently serve in Congress, two in the House of Representatives and one in the Senate. All being members of the Democratic Party.

== Senate ==
Senator	Party	State	Term			Sect (School)	Notes
Senator	Party	State	Start	End	Length of service	Sect (School)	Notes
Mazie Hirono	Democratic	Hawaii	January 3, 2013	Incumbent	13 years, 322 days	Jodo Shu (Pure Land)	First Buddhist senator

== House of Representatives ==
Representative	Party	District	Term			Sect (School)	Notes
Representative	Party	District	Start	End	Length of service	Sect (School)	Notes
Mazie Hirono	Democratic	HI-02	January 3, 2007	January 3, 2013	6 years, 0 days	Jodo Shu (Pure Land)	One of the first two Buddhists in Congress. Retired to run successfully for U.S. Senator from Hawaii.
Hank Johnson	Democratic	GA-04	January 3, 2007	Incumbent	19 years, 322 days	Soka Gakkai (Nichiren)	One of the first two Buddhists in Congress
Colleen Hanabusa	Democratic	HI-01	January 3, 2011	January 3, 2015	4 years, 0 days	Jodo Shinshu (Pure Land)	Retired to run unsuccessfully for U.S. Senator from Hawaii.
Colleen Hanabusa	Democratic	HI-01	November 14, 2016	January 3, 2019	2 years, 50 days	Jodo Shinshu (Pure Land)	Elected in special election to succeed Mark Takai, who died in office Retired to run unsuccessfully for governor of Hawaii
Derek Tran	Democratic	CA-45	January 3, 2025	Incumbent	1 year, 322 days	Unspecified	Tran has not specified a specific school or sect, but has spoken at Vietnamese Buddhist temples, a tradition that is usually Mahayana, and in defense of prosecuted Vietnamese Buddhist officials.

== Secular Buddhism ==
A number of members of the United States Congress who do not formally affiliate with or have a background of Buddhism varyingly engage with Buddhist practices like mindfulness, meditation and studying the Buddhist Dharma; notably US Representative from SC-1, Mark Sanford (R), engaged with and spoke about Buddhism and stated that his friend told him he was "becoming a Buddhist Christian", with his own staffers reportedly telling FITSNews that "it seemed to me he [Sanford] was both Christian and Buddhist." However, Sanford did refute claims that he had formally converted to Buddhism.

Former US Representative Tim Ryan (D) of Ohio also engaged with Buddhist practices through a secular lens; Ryan, formally a Roman Catholic, regularly engaged with Buddhist meditation and mindfulness; publishing the book A Mindful Nation in 2012 and speaking about his practice regularly throughout his career, as well as encouraging his fellow Congressmembers to try meditation as well as securing federal funding for a meditation program for schools in his district. However, Ryan, similarly to Sanford, has stated he is still a Catholic.

== See also ==
- List of Hindu members of the United States Congress
- List of Jewish members of the United States Congress
- List of Mormon members of the United States Congress
- List of Muslim members of the United States Congress
- List of Quaker members of the United States Congress
- List of Asian Americans and Pacific Islands Americans in the United States Congress
