= List of Hindu members of the United States Congress =

This is a list of Hindu members of the United States Congress.

As of 2025, five Hindus have been elected to Congress, the first being Tulsi Gabbard in 2013. As of the 119th Congress, four Hindus currently serve in Congress, all in the House of Representatives, and all being members of the Democratic Party.

== Senate ==
No Hindu has ever served in the United States Senate. Kamala Harris (D) of California, a former senator who was elected Vice President in 2020, was raised by a Hindu mother but identifies as a Baptist.

== House of Representatives ==
In addition to the representatives below, former representative Bobby Jindal (R-LA-01) of Louisiana was born in a Hindu family but converted to Catholicism. Current representatives Ami Bera (D-CA-06) of California who identifies as a Unitarian Universalist, and Pramila Jayapal (D-WA-07) of Washington, whose religious affiliation is unknown, were born in Hindu families.

Representative	Party	District	Term			Notes
Representative	Party	District	Start	End	Length of service	Notes
Tulsi Gabbard	Democratic	HI-02	January 3, 2013	January 3, 2021	8 years, 0 days	First practicing Hindu elected to Congress. Retired to run unsuccessfully for president of the United States.
Ro Khanna	Democratic	CA-17	January 3, 2017	Incumbent	9 years, 306 days	One of the first two practicing Hindus of Indian descent to be elected to Congress.
Raja Krishnamoorthi	Democratic	IL-08	January 3, 2017	Incumbent	9 years, 306 days	One of the first two practicing Hindus of Indian descent to be elected to Congress.
Shri Thanedar	Democratic	MI-13	January 3, 2023	Incumbent	3 years, 306 days	Previously identified as a Protestant in Pew Research Center's survey of the 118th Congress, later changed affiliation to Hindu in the 119th Congress.
Suhas Subramanyam	Democratic	VA-10	January 3, 2025	Incumbent	1 year, 306 days	

== See also ==
- List of Buddhist members of the United States Congress
- List of Jewish members of the United States Congress
- List of Mormon members of the United States Congress
- List of Muslim members of the United States Congress
- List of Quaker members of the United States Congress
- List of Asian Americans and Pacific Islands Americans in the United States Congress
