= List of Quaker members of the United States Congress =

As of 2025, twenty-four Quakers have ever been elected to the United States Congress, the first being John Chew Thomas in 1799. One Quaker currently serves in the Congress.

== Senate ==
Senator	Party	State	Term			Notes
Senator	Party	State	Start	End	Length of service (days)	Notes
William Windom	Republican	Minnesota	July 15, 1870	January 22, 1871	191 days	Successor qualified
William Windom	Republican	Minnesota	March 4, 1871	March 7, 1881	10 years, 3 days	Resigned to become United States Secretary of the Treasury
William Windom	Republican	Minnesota	March 7, 1889	January 29, 1891	1 year, 328 days	Lost re-election
Arthur Capper	Republican	Kansas	March 4, 1919	January 3, 1949	29 years, 305 days	Retired
Joseph R. Grundy	Republican	Pennsylvania	December 11, 1929	December 1, 1930	355 days	Lost re-election
Paul Douglas	Democratic	Illinois	January 3, 1949	January 3, 1967	18 years, 0 days	Lost re-election
Richard Nixon	Republican	California	December 1, 1950	January 1, 1953	2 years, 31 days	Resigned, having been elected vice president of the United States
John Hickenlooper	Democratic	Colorado	January 3, 2021	Incumbent	5 years, 223 days	

== House of Representatives ==
Senator	Party	District	Term			Notes
Senator	Party	District	Start	End	Length of service (days)	Notes
John Chew Thomas	Federalist	MD-02	March 4, 1799	March 1, 1801	1 year, 362 days	Retired
John Conard	Democratic- Republican	PA-01	March 8, 1813	March 8, 1815	2 years, 0 days	Retired
William Darlington	Democratic- Republican	PA-02	March 4, 1815	March 3, 1817	1 year, 364 days	
William Darlington	Democratic- Republican	PA-02	March 4, 1819	March 3, 1823	3 years, 364 days	
Edward Bates	National Republican Party	MO-AL	March 4, 1827	March 3, 1829	1 year, 364 days	
John Wethered	Whig	MD-03	April 8, 1843	March 8, 1845	1 year, 334 days	
Joseph Grinnell	Whig	MA-10	December 7, 1843	March 8, 1851	7 years, 91 days	Retired
Samuel G. Wright	Whig	NJ-02	March 4, 1845	July 30, 1845	148 days	Died in office
David P. Holloway	Opposition	IN-05	January 4, 1855	January 3, 1857	1 year, 365 days	
William Windom	Republican	MN-01	January 4, 1863	January 4, 1869	6 years, 0 days	Retired
Isaac Ambrose Barber	Republican	MD-01	January 4, 1897	January 3, 1899	1 year, 364 days	
Thomas S. Butler	Republican	PA-06	March 8, 1897	March 8, 1903	31 years, 79 days	Died in office
Thomas S. Butler	Republican	PA-07	March 8, 1903	March 8, 1923	31 years, 79 days	Died in office
Thomas S. Butler	Republican	PA-08	March 8, 1923	May 26, 1928	31 years, 79 days	Died in office
William W. Cocks	Republican	NY-01	March 4, 1905	March 3, 1911	5 years, 364 days	
A. Mitchell Palmer	Democratic	PA-26	March 4, 1909	March 3, 1915	5 years, 364 days	Retired to unsuccessfully run for the Senate
Frederick C. Hicks	Republican	NY-01	January 4, 1916	March 3, 1923	6 years, 364 days	
Andrew Biemiller	Democratic	WI-05	January 3, 1945	January 3, 1947	2 years, 0 days	Lost re-election
Andrew Biemiller	Democratic	WI-05	January 3, 1949	January 3, 1951	2 years, 0 days	Lost re-election
Richard Nixon	Republican	CA-12	January 3, 1947	November 30, 1950	3 years, 331 days	Resigned on appointment to the Senate
Edward Tylor Miller	Republican	MD-01	January 3, 1947	January 3, 1959	12 years, 0 days	Lost re-election
William G. Bray	Republican	IN-07	January 3, 1951	January 3, 1967	16 years, 0 days	Lost re-election
William G. Bray	Republican	IN-06	January 3, 1967	January 3, 1975	16 years, 0 days	Lost re-election
Edwin B. Forsythe	Republican	NJ-06	November 3, 1970	January 3, 1983	13 years, 147 days	Died in office
Edwin B. Forsythe	Republican	NJ-13	January 3, 1983	March 29, 1984	13 years, 147 days	Died in office
Rush Holt Jr.	Democratic	NJ-12	January 3, 1999	January 3, 2015	16 years, 0 days	Retired

== See also ==
- List of Buddhist members of the United States Congress
- List of Hindu members of the United States Congress
- List of Jewish members of the United States Congress
- List of Mormon members of the United States Congress
- List of Muslim members of the United States Congress
