= Samuel A. Spiegel =

American lawyer and politician (1914–1977)

Samuel Anthony Spiegel (April 26, 1914 – May 26, 1977) was an American lawyer, politician, and judge from New York City.

== Life ==
Spiegel was born on April 26, 1914, in New York City, New York, the son of Galician Jewish immigrants Max Spiegel and Gussie Zeller. His father was a tailor.

Spiegel attended New York City public schools, Seward Park High School, and St. John's College of Arts and Sciences. He graduated from St. John's Law School in 1936 and became a practicing lawyer in 1937. He was a partner in the law firm Spiegel and Davis and had law offices at 291 Broadway. During World War II, he initially served in the United States Army with the Volunteer Officer's Candidate Program. When the Program was abolished, he spent around three years in the United States Navy, where he was a defense counsel in court-martial cases (for which he received a commendation) and a teacher of law.

In 1956, Spiegel was elected to the New York State Assembly as a Democrat, representing the New York County 4th District. He served in the Assembly in 1957–1958, 1959–1960, and 1961–1962. In the latter two elections, he ran with both the Democratic Party and the Liberal Party. During that time, he wrote "The Forgotten Man in Housing," a widely used reference book on public housing law, site tenants, relocation practices, and administrative rules and regulations. He also lectured on State Government, Housing and Legislation at City College of New York, Pace College, and Long Island University. In the Assembly, he sponsored laws that permitted tenants to withhold rent payments to landlords that failed to properly maintain their buildings and prioritize public housing to people displaced in urban renewal. He also successfully fought against a change in billing procedures by Consolidated Edison that would have led to higher charges for some apartment dwellers.

In October 1962, Mayor Robert F. Wagner Jr. appointed Spiegel an interim Justice of the New York City Civil Court. He was then elected to a full term as Justice. In 1966, he was elected Justice of the New York Supreme Court, First Judicial District as a Democrat and Liberal candidate. As Justice, he defended the rights of drug addicts, welfare recipients, and women seeking abortions. In 1967, he ruled that a law confining addicts to institutions for forced treatment against their will was unconstitutional. In 1969, he warned the state that if it didn't live up to its obligation to provide meaningful drug rehabilitation programs to prisoners he would order the release of some of the prisoners. He also ruled that welfare recipients were entitled to a fair hearing before their payments were reduced, suspended, or ended, forced the reversal of a state decision to bar Medicaid payments for abortions in all but "medically indicted cases," and held that it was an unwarranted invasion of privacy to require women who had abortions to have their names and addresses on fetal death certificates.

In 1976, Spiegel was elected one of Manhattan's two Surrogates by an overwhelming margin. Before he died a few months into his term as Surrogate, he was working on establishing an office public guardian in the Surrogate Court to represent widows and orphans in the settlement of wills so they wouldn't have to pay legal fees to lawyers from the estate proceedings. He was returning from a Surrogates meeting in Saratoga Springs when he had his third (and ultimately fatal) heart attack.

Spiegel was a director of the Grand Street Settlement, the Stuyvesant Polyclinic, the Home for Sons & Daughters of Israel, the Downtown Talmud Torah, the Hebrew Immigrant Aid Society, the Lower East Side Democratic Club, and the East Side Chamber of Commerce. He was also chairman of Local School Board No. 3, president of the Clark House Alumni Association and the Seward Park High School Alumni Association, chancellor commander of the Lenton Lodge of the Knights of Pythias, and a member of the New York County Lawyers' Association, the American Bar Association, the New York Association of Plaintiffs' Trial Lawyers, the American Legion, the Grand Street Boys, and the Inter-Faith Movement, Inc. He was also president of the Samuel Dickstein Lodge of B'nai B'rith.

In 1942, Spiegel married teacher Charlotte S. Newman, with Rabbi Bernard Bergman officiating the wedding at the Knapp Mansion in Brooklyn. Charlotte successfully advocated for requiring metal guard windows for New York City apartments with children under 10, the first such requirement in the country, which dramatically reduced the number of children killed or injured from falling from windows. She was a passenger during the Achille Lauro hijacking. She was a member of the League of Women Voters and a delegate to multiple Democratic National Conventions. In 1953, she became co-leader of her largely Puerto Rican district. In 1963, she became the first woman chair of the Democratic county executive committee. And when Tammany Hall leader Edward N. Costikyan resigned in 1964, she was named acting leader until the executive committee elected a successor, making her the first woman to lead Tammany Hall. The New York City Bar Association challenged this on propriety grounds, since her husband Spiegel was serving on the Civil Court at the time, and argued one of them needed to resign. They fought against the criticism and received support from the New York Civil Liberties Union and the New York State Association of Trial Lawyers. They had two daughters, Jill and Maura.

Spiegel died from a heart attack at the Beekman Downtown Hospital on May 26, 1977. His funeral was held at the Riverside Memorial Chapel. The Samuel A. Spiegel Square on Madison Street, Grand Street, and Jackson Street on the Lower East Side was named after him.

New York State Assembly
Preceded by Leonard Farbstein	New York State Assembly; New York County, 4th District; 1957–1962	Succeeded by Jerome W. Marks
