= Harry B. Wolf =

American politician

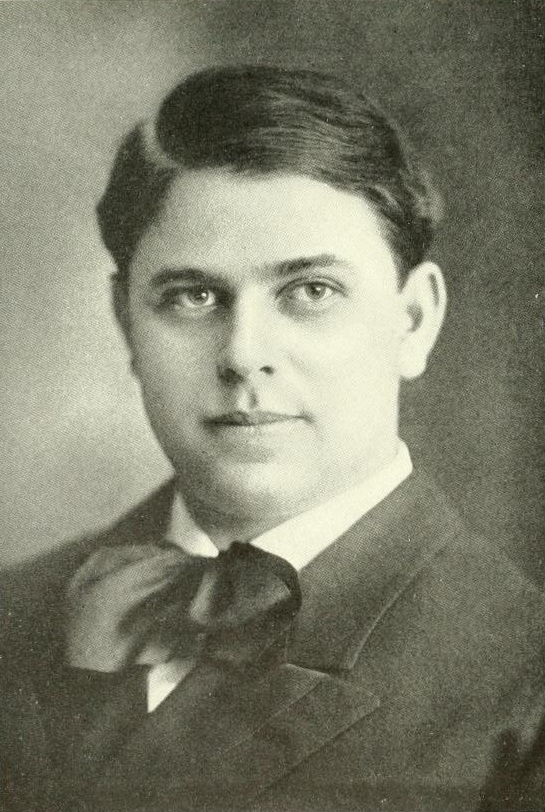
From 1914's Distinguished Men of Baltimore and of Maryland

Harry Benjamin Wolf (June 16, 1880 – February 17, 1944) was an American politician and Congressman from Maryland.

== Formation ==
Born in Baltimore, Maryland from Jacob Wolf and Mollie Furstenberg Wolf, he had two other siblings.

Wolf attended the public schools of the city. To earn money, he was a paperboy and sold fruit, before he and his brother bought a horse and a wagon in order to sell bananas bought on the waterfront to Baltimore shopkeepers, earning an important sum of money.

He graduated from the law department of the University of Maryland, Baltimore in 1901.

== Law career ==
He was admitted to the bar the same year and commenced the practice of law in Baltimore, specialising in criminal cases, and also engaged in the real estate business and hotel-property investments, even creating a successful ferry company.

In 1922, defending 19-year-old Walter Socolow, one of the five persons arrested for the murder of William Norris, Wolf saved him from hanging, while being held guilty by the jury, by conspiring with one of Socolow's accomplices to destroy the confession of another accomplice, who had turned State's evidence. Wolf was held guilty of obstructing justice, disbarred, fined and placed on probation.

From 1911, Wolf, along with other lawyers, was involved in a scheme to get cheaper housemaids for prominent Baltimore families by using Habeas corpus writs for Rosewood Center mentally challenged inmates. Once released into the custody of these families, they were often mistreated, with a low or even no pay, and sometimes abandoned in the streets when these families complained about their low productivity, or else dying from the poor labor conditions. This scheme was denounced by Leo Kanner in 1937.

== Politics ==
Wolf served as a member of the Maryland House of Delegates from 1906 to 1908.

He was nominated by the local section of the Democratic party, and was elected as a Democrat to the Sixtieth Congress, serving from March 4, 1907, to March 3, 1909. He was an unsuccessful candidate for reelection in 1908 to the Sixty-first Congress, being beaten by John Kronmiller, and resumed the practice of his profession and other business interests in Baltimore.

== Personal life ==
He married Sara and they had four sons, Frederick S. Wolf, Edwin J. Wolf, Harry B. Wolf Jr. and Alan M. Wolf. Sara died on August 12, 1964.

He was named grand master of the Independent Order of B'rith Shalom.

== Death ==
He died in Baltimore, and is interred in the Hebrew Friendship Cemetery.

== See also ==
- List of Jewish members of the United States Congress

U.S. House of Representatives
Preceded by Frank Charles Wachter	Member of the U.S. House of Representatives from Maryland's 3rd congressional district 1907–1909	Succeeded by John Kronmiller
