= SS Ralph A. Cram =

World War II Liberty ship of the United States

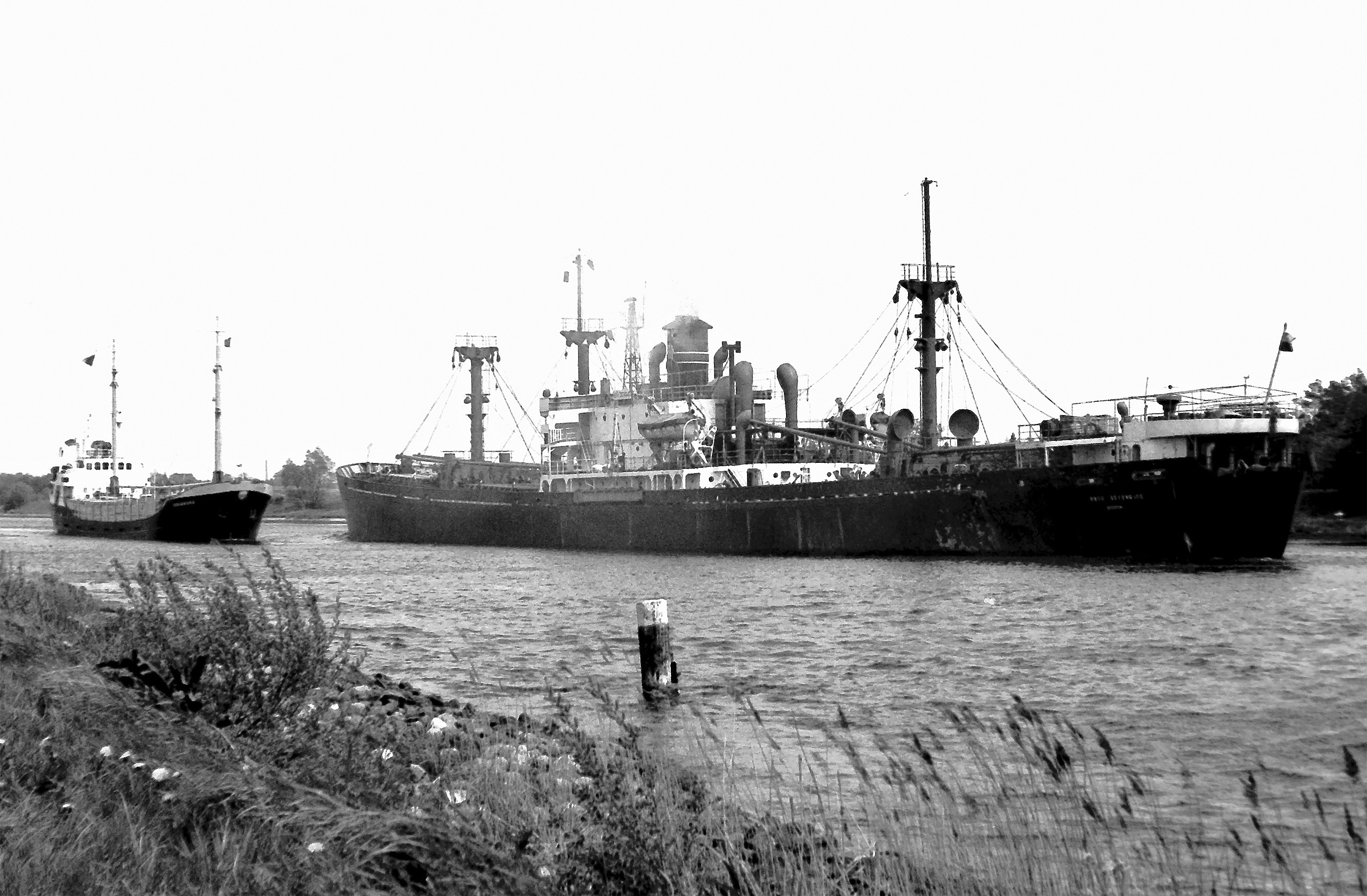
- Huta Ostroviec in 1969

History

United States
- Name: Ralph A. Cram
- Namesake: Ralph A. Cram
- Builder: California Shipbuilding Corp.
- Completed: 1943
- Commissioned: 1943
- Renamed: Atlantico, 1947; Huta Ostroviec, 1963
- Fate: Scrapped, 1973

General characteristics
- Class & type: Liberty ship
- Displacement: 14,245 long tons (14,474 t)
- Length: 441 ft 6 in (134.57 m) o/a; 417 ft 9 in (127.33 m) p/p; 427 ft (130 m) w/l
- Beam: 57 ft (17 m)
- Draft: 27 ft 9 in (8.46 m)
- Propulsion: Two oil-fired boilers; Triple-expansion steam engine; 2,500 hp (1,900 kW); Single screw
- Speed: 11 knots (20 km/h; 13 mph)
- Range: 20,000 nmi (37,000 km; 23,000 mi)
- Capacity: 10,856 t (10,685 long tons) deadweight (DWT)
- Crew: 81
- Armament: Stern-mounted 4 in (100 mm) deck gun for use against surfaced submarines, variety of anti-aircraft guns

SS Ralph A. Cram was an American Liberty ship built in 1943 for service in World War II. Her namesake was Ralph Adams Cram, an influential American architect of collegiate and ecclesiastical buildings. She was operated by Smith-Johnson Steamship Corporation under charter with the Maritime Commission and War Shipping Administration.

== Design ==
Like other Liberty ships, she was 441 feet (134 m) long and 56 feet (17 m) wide, carried 9000 tons of cargo and had a top speed of 11 knots (20 km/h). Most Liberty ships were named after prominent deceased Americans.

== Construction and career ==
This particular ship was built by California Shipbuilding Corporation in Los Angeles. She was completed and commissioned in 1943.

After the war, she was sold to commercial service and renamed Atlantico in 1947.

Later again sold to Polish Steamship Company in 1963 and renamed Huta Ostroviec.

She was scrapped in 1973.
