= Grover M. Moscowitz =

American judge (1886–1947)

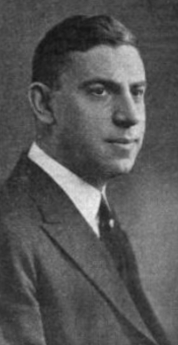

Judge of the United States District Court for the Eastern District of New York
- In office December 21, 1925 – March 31, 1947
- Appointed by: Calvin Coolidge
- Preceded by: Edwin Louis Garvin
- Succeeded by: Leo F. Rayfiel

Personal details
- Born: August 31, 1886 Hot Springs, Arkansas, US
- Died: March 31, 1947 (aged 60) New York City, New York, US
- Education: New York University School of Law (LL.B.)

Grover M. Moscowitz (August 31, 1886 – March 31, 1947) was a United States district judge of the United States District Court for the Eastern District of New York.

== Education and career ==
Born in Hot Springs, Arkansas, Moscowitz received a Bachelor of Laws from New York University School of Law in 1906. He was in private practice of law in Brooklyn, New York from 1907 to 1925. He was a special deputy state attorney general of New York from 1909 to 1910 and from 1922 to 1925.

== Federal judicial service ==
Moscowitz was nominated by President Calvin Coolidge on December 16, 1925, to a seat on the United States District Court for the Eastern District of New York vacated by Judge Edwin Louis Garvin. He was confirmed by the United States Senate on December 21, 1925, and received his commission the same day. His service was terminated on March 31, 1947, due to his death in New York City, New York.

== See also ==
- List of Jewish American jurists

== Sources ==
Legal offices
Preceded by Edwin Louis Garvin	Judge of the United States District Court for the Eastern District of New York; 1925–1947	Succeeded by Leo F. Rayfiel
