= Edwin Louis Garvin =

American judge (1877–1960)

Edwin L. Garvin

Judge of the United States District Court for the Eastern District of New York
- In office March 21, 1918 – October 31, 1925
- Appointed by: Woodrow Wilson
- Preceded by: Van Vechten Veeder
- Succeeded by: Grover M. Moscowitz

Personal details
- Born: Edwin Louis Garvin; October 25, 1877 Brooklyn, New York
- Died: October 10, 1960 (aged 82) Patchogue, New York
- Education: New York University (A.B.); New York University School of Law (LL.B.)

Edwin Louis Garvin (October 25, 1877 – October 10, 1960) was a United States district judge of the United States District Court for the Eastern District of New York.

== Education and career ==
Born on October 25, 1877, in Brooklyn, New York, Garvin received an Artium Baccalaureus degree in 1897 from New York University and a Bachelor of Laws in 1899 from New York University School of Law. He entered private practice in New York City, New York, from 1902 to 1915. He was a justice of the New York Court of Special Sessions from 1915 to 1918.

== Federal judicial service ==
Garvin was nominated by President Woodrow Wilson on March 6, 1918, to a seat on the United States District Court for the Eastern District of New York vacated by Judge Van Vechten Veeder. He was confirmed by the United States Senate on March 21, 1918, and received his commission the same day. His service terminated on October 31, 1925, due to his resignation.

== Later career and death ==
Following his resignation from the federal bench, Garvin resumed private practice in New York City starting in 1925. He was a Judge for the Kings County, New York Court in 1940. He was a justice of the Supreme Court of New York from 1941 to 1947. He was an official referee for the Supreme Court of New York from 1948 to 1960. He died on October 10, 1960, in Patchogue, New York.

== Sources ==
Legal offices
Preceded by Van Vechten Veeder	Judge of the United States District Court for the Eastern District of New York; 1918–1925	Succeeded by Grover M. Moscowitz
