= Jerome W. Marks =

American politician

Member of the New York State Assembly from the 61st district
- In office January 1, 1967 – December 31, 1968
- Preceded by: James H. Tully Jr.
- Succeeded by: Anthony G. DiFalco

Member of the New York State Assembly from the 67th district
- In office January 1, 1966 – December 31, 1966
- Preceded by: District created
- Succeeded by: Albert H. Blumenthal

Member of the New York State Assembly from New York's 4th district
- In office January 1, 1963 – December 31, 1965
- Preceded by: Samuel A. Spiegel
- Succeeded by: District abolished

Personal details
- Born: June 22, 1915 Manhattan, New York City, New York
- Died: March 9, 2011 (aged 95) Manhattan, New York City, New York
- Party: Democratic

Jerome W. Marks (June 22, 1915 – March 9, 2011) was an American politician who served in the New York State Assembly from 1963 to 1968.

He died on March 9, 2011, in Manhattan, New York City, New York at age 95.
