= List of Jewish members of the United States Congress =

== Senate ==
| Name | Party | State | Term | | | Notes |
| Name | Party | State | Start | End | Duration | Notes |
|---|---|---|---|---|---|---|
| **David Levy Yulee** (Note: Born (and raised) Jewish, but converted to Episcopalianism in his mid-to-late 30s while serving as a U.S. Senator.) (1810–1886) | Democratic | Florida | July 1, 1845 | March 4, 1851 | 5 years, 246 days | Lost renomination |
| **David Levy Yulee** (1810–1886) | Democratic | Florida | March 4, 1855 | January 21, 1861 | 5 years, 323 days | Withdrew from the Senate in 1861 following the secession of Florida from the Union |
| **Judah P. Benjamin** (1811–1884) | Whig (1853–1856) | Louisiana | March 4, 1853 | February 4, 1861 | 7 years, 337 days | Withdrew from the Senate in 1861 following the secession of Louisiana from the Union |
| **Judah P. Benjamin** (1811–1884) | Democratic (1856–1861) | Louisiana | March 4, 1853 | February 4, 1861 | 7 years, 337 days | Withdrew from the Senate in 1861 following the secession of Louisiana from the Union |
| **Benjamin F. Jonas** (1834–1911) | Democratic | Louisiana | March 4, 1879 | March 4, 1885 | 6 years, 0 days | Lost renomination |
| **Joseph Simon** (1851–1935) | Republican | Oregon | October 7, 1898 | March 4, 1903 | 4 years, 148 days | Retired |
| **Isidor Rayner** (1850–1912) | Democratic | Maryland | March 4, 1905 | November 25, 1912 | 7 years, 266 days | Died in office |
| **Simon Guggenheim** (1867–1941) | Republican | Colorado | March 4, 1907 | March 4, 1913 | 6 years, 0 days | Retired |
| **Herbert H. Lehman** (1878–1963) | Democratic | New York | November 9, 1949 | January 3, 1957 | 7 years, 55 days | Retired |
| **Richard L. Neuberger** (1912–1960) | Democratic | Oregon | January 3, 1955 | March 9, 1960 | 5 years, 66 days | Died in office |
| **Jacob Javits** (1904–1986) | Republican | New York | January 9, 1957 | January 3, 1981 | 23 years, 360 days | Lost reelection as Liberal Party nominee after having lost Republican Party renomination |
| **Ernest Gruening** (1887–1974) | Democratic | Alaska | January 3, 1959 | January 3, 1969 | 10 years, 0 days | Lost renomination Lost write-in reelection |
| **Abraham Ribicoff** (1910–1998) | Democratic | Connecticut | January 3, 1963 | January 3, 1981 | 18 years, 0 days | Retired |
| **Howard Metzenbaum** (1917–2008) | Democratic | Ohio | January 4, 1974 | December 23, 1974 | 353 days | Resigned to permit governor to appoint winner of general election, after previously having lost renomination for new term |
| **Howard Metzenbaum** (1917–2008) | Democratic | Ohio | December 29, 1976 | January 3, 1995 | 18 years, 5 days | Retired |
| **Richard Stone** (1928–2019) | Democratic | Florida | January 1, 1975 | December 31, 1980 | 5 years, 365 days | Lost renomination |
| **Edward Zorinsky** (1928–1987) | Democratic | Nebraska | December 28, 1976 | March 6, 1987 | 10 years, 68 days | Died in office |
| **Rudy Boschwitz** (born 1930) | Republican | Minnesota | December 30, 1978 | January 3, 1991 | 12 years, 4 days | Lost reelection |
| **William Cohen** (Note: Born to a Jewish father and a Protestant mother, Cohen was raised Jewish until his Bar Mitzvah, after which he quit the Jewish faith.) (born 1940) | Republican | Maine | January 3, 1979 | January 3, 1997 | 18 years, 0 days | Retired |
| **Carl Levin** (1934–2021) | Democratic | Michigan | January 3, 1979 | January 3, 2015 | 36 years, 0 days | Retired |
| **Warren Rudman** (1930–2012) | Republican | New Hampshire | December 29, 1980 | January 3, 1993 | 12 years, 5 days | Retired |
| **Arlen Specter** (1930–2012) | Republican (1981–2009) | Pennsylvania | January 3, 1981 | January 3, 2011 | 30 years, 0 days | Lost renomination by the Democratic Party, to which he had switched the prior year. |
| **Arlen Specter** (1930–2012) | Democratic (2009–2011) | Pennsylvania | January 3, 1981 | January 3, 2011 | 30 years, 0 days | Lost renomination by the Democratic Party, to which he had switched the prior year. |
| **Frank Lautenberg** (1924–2013) | Democratic | New Jersey | December 27, 1982 | January 3, 2001 | 18 years, 7 days | Retired |
| **Frank Lautenberg** (1924–2013) | Democratic | New Jersey | January 3, 2003 | June 3, 2013 | 10 years, 151 days | Died in office |
| **Chic Hecht** (1928–2006) | Republican | Nevada | January 3, 1983 | January 3, 1989 | 6 years, 0 days | Lost reelection |
| **Herb Kohl** (1935–2023) | Democratic | Wisconsin | January 3, 1989 | January 3, 2013 | 24 years, 0 days | Retired |
| **Joe Lieberman** (1942–2024) | Democratic (1989–2006) | Connecticut | January 3, 1989 | January 3, 2013 | 24 years, 0 days | Lost renomination, but re-elected on the Connecticut for Lieberman ticket in 2006; Retired |
| **Joe Lieberman** (1942–2024) | Independent (2006–2013) | Connecticut | January 3, 1989 | January 3, 2013 | 24 years, 0 days | Lost renomination, but re-elected on the Connecticut for Lieberman ticket in 2006; Retired |
| **Paul Wellstone** (1944–2002) | Democratic (DFL) | Minnesota | January 3, 1991 | October 25, 2002 | 11 years, 295 days | Died in office |
| **Dianne Feinstein** (1933–2023) | Democratic | California | November 10, 1992 | September 29, 2023 | 30 years, 323 days | Died in office |
| **Barbara Boxer** (born 1940) | Democratic | California | January 3, 1993 | January 3, 2017 | 24 years, 0 days | Retired |
| **Russ Feingold** (born 1953) | Democratic | Wisconsin | January 3, 1993 | January 3, 2011 | 18 years, 0 days | Lost reelection |
| **Ron Wyden** (born 1949) | Democratic | Oregon | February 6, 1996 | Incumbent | 30 years, 279 days | |
| **Chuck Schumer** (born 1950) | Democratic | New York | January 3, 1999 | Incumbent | 27 years, 313 days | First Jewish Senate Majority Leader and Senate Minority Leader |
| **Norm Coleman** (born 1949) | Republican | Minnesota | January 3, 2003 | January 3, 2009 | 6 years, 0 days | Lost reelection |
| **Ben Cardin** (born 1943) | Democratic | Maryland | January 3, 2007 | January 3, 2025 | 18 years, 0 days | Retired |
| **Bernie Sanders** (born 1941) | Independent | Vermont | January 3, 2007 | Incumbent | 19 years, 313 days | Elected as an Independent. Began identifying alternately as an Independent or Democrat while running in the 2016 Democratic presidential primaries. Officially joined the Democratic Party after signing a declaratory pledge, but kept his independent affiliation in the Senate. |
| **Al Franken** (born 1951) | Democratic (DFL) | Minnesota | July 7, 2009 | January 2, 2018 | 8 years, 179 days | Resigned |
| **Michael Bennet** (born 1964) | Democratic | Colorado | January 21, 2009 | Incumbent | 17 years, 295 days | |
| **Richard Blumenthal** (born 1946) | Democratic | Connecticut | January 3, 2011 | Incumbent | 15 years, 313 days | |
| **Brian Schatz** (born 1972) | Democratic | Hawaii | December 26, 2012 | Incumbent | 13 years, 321 days | |
| **Jacky Rosen** (born 1957) | Democratic | Nevada | January 3, 2019 | Incumbent | 7 years, 313 days | |
| **Jon Ossoff** (born 1987) | Democratic | Georgia | January 20, 2021 | Incumbent | 5 years, 296 days | |
| **Adam Schiff** (born 1960) | Democratic | California | December 9, 2024 | Incumbent | 1 year, 338 days | |
| **Elissa Slotkin** (born 1976) | Democratic | Michigan | January 3, 2025 | Incumbent | 1 year, 313 days | |

=== Elected to the Senate, but not seated ===
| Name | Party | State | Year elected | Notes |
|---|---|---|---|---|
| **Michael Hahn** (1830–1886) | Republican | Louisiana | 1865 | Not seated due to policy of Radical Republicans not to seat any senators-elect from former Confederate states until a Reconstruction plan had been adopted |

=== List of states with Jewish U.S. senators ===
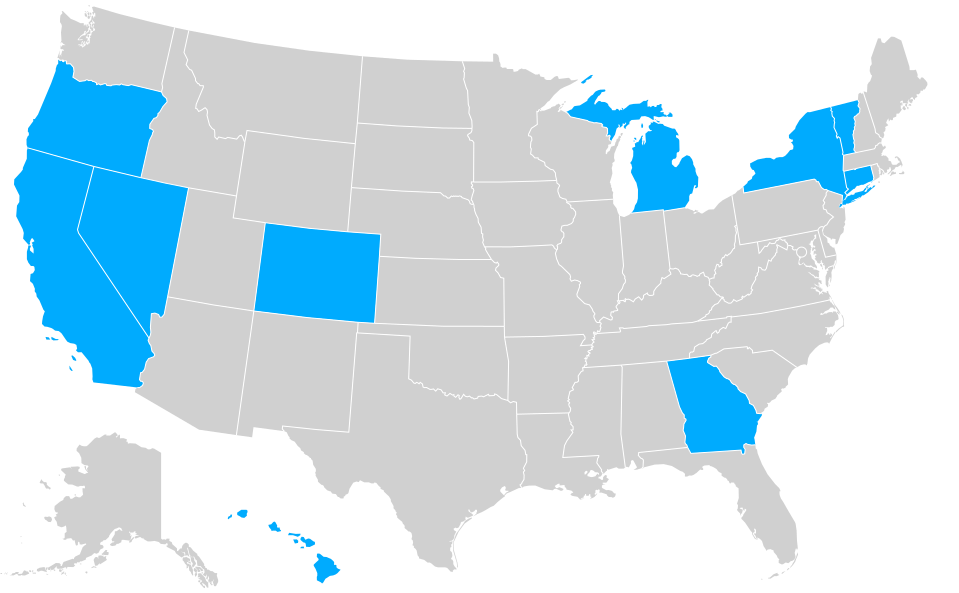
Map of Jewish senators serving in the 119th Congress. States colored in blue have a Jewish incumbent.

Twenty-two states have been represented by Jewish senators. As of January 3, 2025, 10 states are represented by Jewish senators.

| State | Current | Previous | Total | First Jewish senator |
|---|---|---|---|---|
| Alabama | 0 | 0 | 0 | |
| Alaska | 0 | 1 | 1 | Ernest Gruening |
| Arizona | 0 | 0 | 0 | |
| Arkansas | 0 | 0 | 0 | |
| California | 1 | 2 | 3 | Dianne Feinstein |
| Colorado | 1 | 1 | 2 | Simon Guggenheim |
| Connecticut | 1 | 2 | 3 | Abraham A. Ribicoff |
| Delaware | 0 | 0 | 0 | |
| Florida | 0 | 2 | 2 | David Levy Yulee |
| Georgia | 1 | 0 | 1 | Jon Ossoff |
| Hawaii | 1 | 0 | 1 | Brian Schatz |
| Idaho | 0 | 0 | 0 | |
| Illinois | 0 | 0 | 0 | |
| Indiana | 0 | 0 | 0 | |
| Iowa | 0 | 0 | 0 | |
| Kansas | 0 | 0 | 0 | |
| Kentucky | 0 | 0 | 0 | |
| Louisiana | 0 | 2 | 2 | Judah P. Benjamin |
| Maine | 0 | 1 | 1 | William Cohen |
| Maryland | 0 | 2 | 2 | Isidor Rayner |
| Massachusetts | 0 | 0 | 0 | |
| Michigan | 1 | 1 | 2 | Carl Levin |
| Minnesota | 0 | 4 | 4 | Rudy Boschwitz |
| Mississippi | 0 | 0 | 0 | |
| Missouri | 0 | 0 | 0 | |
| Montana | 0 | 0 | 0 | |
| Nebraska | 0 | 1 | 1 | Edward Zorinsky |
| Nevada | 1 | 1 | 2 | Chic Hecht |
| New Hampshire | 0 | 1 | 1 | Warren Rudman |
| New Jersey | 0 | 1 | 1 | Frank Lautenberg |
| New Mexico | 0 | 0 | 0 | |
| New York | 1 | 2 | 3 | Herbert H. Lehman |
| North Carolina | 0 | 0 | 0 | |
| North Dakota | 0 | 0 | 0 | |
| Ohio | 0 | 1 | 1 | Howard Metzenbaum |
| Oklahoma | 0 | 0 | 0 | |
| Oregon | 1 | 2 | 3 | Joseph Simon |
| Pennsylvania | 0 | 1 | 1 | Arlen Specter |
| Rhode Island | 0 | 0 | 0 | |
| South Carolina | 0 | 0 | 0 | |
| South Dakota | 0 | 0 | 0 | |
| Tennessee | 0 | 0 | 0 | |
| Texas | 0 | 0 | 0 | |
| Utah | 0 | 0 | 0 | |
| Vermont | 1 | 0 | 1 | Bernie Sanders |
| Virginia | 0 | 0 | 0 | |
| Washington | 0 | 0 | 0 | |
| West Virginia | 0 | 0 | 0 | |
| Wisconsin | 0 | 2 | 2 | Herb Kohl |
| Wyoming | 0 | 0 | 0 | |

=== Concurrently serving Jewish senators from the same state ===
| State | Start date | End date | Duration | Senior senator | Junior senator |
|---|---|---|---|---|---|
| California | January 3, 1993 | January 3, 2017 | 24 years, 0 days | Dianne Feinstein (D) | Barbara Boxer (D) |
| Wisconsin | January 3, 1993 | January 3, 2011 | 18 years, 0 days | Herb Kohl (D) | Russ Feingold (D) |
| Connecticut | January 3, 2011 | January 3, 2013 | 2 years, 0 days | Joe Lieberman (I) | Richard Blumenthal (D) |

=== Elections with two Jewish major-party nominees ===
Incumbent senators are in bold.

Elections with two Jewish major-party nominees
| Election year | State | Winner | Second-place finisher |
|---|---|---|---|
| 1990 | Maine | **William Cohen** | Neil Rolde |
| 1990 | Minnesota | Paul Wellstone | **Rudy Boschwitz** |
| 1992 | California | Barbara Boxer | Bruce Herschensohn |
| 1996 | Minnesota | **Paul Wellstone** | Rudy Boschwitz |
| 2008 | Minnesota | Al Franken | **Norm Coleman** |
| 2008 | New Jersey | **Frank Lautenberg** | Dick Zimmer |
| 2022 | Connecticut | **Richard Blumenthal** | Leora Levy |

== House of Representatives ==
| Name | Party | District | Term | | | Notes |
| Name | Party | District | Start | End | Duration | Notes |
|---|---|---|---|---|---|---|
| Lewis Charles Levin (1808–1860) | American (Know Nothing) | PA-01 | March 4, 1845 | March 4, 1851 | 6 years, 0 days | Lost reelection |
| Emanuel B. Hart (1809–1897) | Democratic | NY-03 | March 4, 1851 | March 4, 1853 | 2 years, 0 days | Lost renomination |
| Philip Phillips (1807–1884) | Democratic | AL-01 | March 4, 1853 | March 4, 1855 | 2 years, 0 days | Retired |
| Henry Myer Phillips (1811–1884) | Democratic | PA-04 | March 4, 1857 | March 4, 1859 | 2 years, 0 days | Lost reelection |
| Michael Hahn (1830–1886) | Union | LA-02 | December 3, 1862 | March 4, 1863 | 91 days | Retired |
| Michael Hahn (1830–1886) | Republican | LA-02 | March 4, 1885 | March 15, 1886 | 1 year, 11 days | Died in office |
| Leonard Myers (1827–1905) | Republican | PA-03 | March 4, 1863 | March 3, 1875 | 11 years, 364 days | Lost reelection |
| Myer Strouse (1825–1878) | Democratic | PA-10 | March 4, 1863 | March 4, 1867 | 4 years, 0 days | Retired |
| William M. Levy (1827–1882) | Democratic | LA-04 | March 4, 1875 | March 4, 1877 | 2 years, 0 days | Lost reelection |
| Leopold Morse (1831–1892) | Democratic | MA-04 (from 1877); MA-05 (from 1883) | March 4, 1877 | March 4, 1885 | 8 years, 0 days | Retired |
| Leopold Morse (1831–1892) | Democratic | MA-03 | March 4, 1887 | March 4, 1889 | 2 years, 0 days | Retired |
| Edwin Einstein (1842–1905) | Republican | NY-07 | March 4, 1879 | March 4, 1881 | 2 years, 0 days | Retired |
| Julius Houseman (1832–1891) | Democratic | MI-05 | March 4, 1883 | March 4, 1885 | 2 years, 0 days | Retired |
| Joseph Pulitzer (1847–1911) | Democratic | NY-09 | March 4, 1885 | April 10, 1886 | 1 year, 37 days | Resigned |
| Isidor Rayner (1850–1912) | Democratic | MD-04 | March 4, 1887 | March 4, 1889 | 2 years, 0 days | Lost reelection |
| Isidor Rayner (1850–1912) | Democratic | MD-04 | March 4, 1891 | March 4, 1895 | 4 years, 0 days | Retired |
| Nathan Frank (1852–1931) | Republican | MO-09 | March 4, 1889 | March 4, 1891 | 2 years, 0 days | Retired |
| Adolph Meyer (1842–1908) | Democratic | LA-01 | March 4, 1891 | March 8, 1908 | 17 years, 4 days | Died in office |
| Julius Goldzier (1854–1925) | Democratic | IL-04 | March 4, 1893 | March 4, 1895 | 2 years, 0 days | Lost reelection |
| Isidor Straus (1845–1912) | Democratic | NY-15 | January 30, 1894 | March 4, 1895 | 1 year, 33 days | Retired |
| Israel F. Fischer (1858–1940) | Republican | NY-04 | March 4, 1895 | March 4, 1899 | 4 years, 0 days | Lost reelection |
| Lucius Littauer (1859–1944) | Republican | NY-22 (from 1897); NY-25 (from 1903) | March 4, 1897 | March 4, 1907 | 10 years, 0 days | Retired |
| Julius Kahn (1861–1924) | Republican | CA-04 | March 4, 1899 | March 4, 1903 | 4 years, 0 days | Lost reelection |
| Julius Kahn (1861–1924) | Republican | CA-04 | March 4, 1905 | December 18, 1924 | 19 years, 289 days | Died in office |
| Jefferson Monroe Levy (1852–1924) | Democratic | NY-13 | March 4, 1899 | March 4, 1901 | 2 years, 0 days | Retired |
| Jefferson Monroe Levy (1852–1924) | Democratic | NY-13 (from 1911); NY-14 (from 1913) | March 4, 1911 | March 4, 1915 | 4 years, 0 days | Retired |
| Mitchell May (1870–1961) | Democratic | NY-06 | March 4, 1899 | March 4, 1901 | 2 years, 0 days | Lost reelection |
| Henry M. Goldfogle (1856–1929) | Democratic | NY-09 (from 1901); NY-12 (from 1913) | March 4, 1901 | March 4, 1915 | 14 years, 0 days | Lost reelection |
| Henry M. Goldfogle (1856–1929) | Democratic | NY-12 | March 4, 1919 | March 4, 1921 | 2 years, 0 days | Lost reelection |
| Montague Lessler (1869–1938) | Republican | NY-07 | January 7, 1902 | March 4, 1903 | 1 year, 56 days | Lost reelection |
| Martin Emerich (1846–1922) | Democratic | IL-01 | March 4, 1903 | March 4, 1905 | 2 years, 0 days | Retired |
| Adolph J. Sabath (1866–1952) | Democratic | IL-05 (from 1907); IL-07 (from 1949) | March 4, 1907 | November 6, 1952 | 45 years, 247 days | Died in office |
| Harry Benjamin Wolf (1880–1944) | Democratic | MD-03 | March 4, 1907 | March 4, 1909 | 2 years, 0 days | Lost reelection |
| Victor L. Berger (1860–1929) | Socialist | WI-05 | March 4, 1911 | March 4, 1913 | 2 years, 0 days | Lost reelection |
| Victor L. Berger (1860–1929) | Socialist | WI-05 | March 4, 1919 | November 10, 1919 | 251 days | House refused to seat due to conviction under the Espionage Act of 1917 |
| Victor L. Berger (1860–1929) | Socialist | WI-05 | March 4, 1923 | March 4, 1929 | 6 years, 0 days | Lost reelection |
| Jacob A. Cantor (1854–1921) | Democratic | NY-20 | November 4, 1913 | March 4, 1915 | 1 year, 120 days | Lost reelection |
| Isaac Bacharach (1870–1956) | Republican | NJ-02 | March 4, 1915 | January 3, 1937 | 21 years, 305 days | Lost reelection |
| Meyer London (1871–1926) | Socialist | NY-12 | March 4, 1915 | March 4, 1919 | 4 years, 0 days | Lost reelection |
| Meyer London (1871–1926) | Socialist | NY-12 | March 4, 1921 | March 4, 1923 | 2 years, 0 days | Lost reelection |
| Isaac Siegel (1880–1947) | Republican | NY-20 | March 4, 1915 | March 4, 1923 | 8 years, 0 days | Retired |
| Milton Kraus (1866–1942) | Republican | IN-11 | March 4, 1917 | March 4, 1923 | 6 years, 0 days | Lost reelection |
| Nathan D. Perlman (1887–1952) | Republican | NY-14 | November 2, 1920 | March 4, 1927 | 6 years, 122 days | Lost reelection |
| Lester D. Volk (1884–1962) | Republican | NY-10 | November 2, 1920 | March 4, 1923 | 2 years, 122 days | Retired |
| Martin C. Ansorge (1882–1967) | Republican | NY-21 | March 4, 1921 | March 4, 1923 | 2 years, 0 days | Lost reelection |
| Benjamin L. Rosenbloom (1880–1965) | Republican | WV-01 | March 4, 1921 | March 4, 1925 | 4 years, 0 days | Retired to run unsuccessfully for the Republican nomination for United States Senate |
| Albert B. Rossdale (1878–1968) | Republican | NY-23 | March 4, 1921 | March 4, 1923 | 2 years, 0 days | Lost reelection |
| Sol Bloom (1870–1949) | Democratic | NY-19 (from 1923); NY-20 (from 1945) | January 30, 1923 | March 7, 1949 | 26 years, 36 days | Died in office |
| Emanuel Celler (1888–1981) | Democratic | NY (several) | March 4, 1923 | January 3, 1973 | 49 years, 305 days | Lost renomination |
| Samuel Dickstein (1885–1954) | Democratic | NY-12 (from 1923); NY-19 (from 1945) | March 4, 1923 | December 30, 1945 | 22 years, 301 days | Resigned to take seat on the New York Supreme Court |
| Meyer Jacobstein (1880–1963) | Democratic | NY-38 | March 4, 1923 | March 4, 1929 | 6 years, 0 days | Retired |
| Benjamin M. Golder (1891–1946) | Republican | PA-04 | March 4, 1925 | March 4, 1933 | 8 years, 0 days | Lost reelection |
| Florence Prag Kahn (1866–1948) | Republican | CA-04 | March 4, 1925 | January 3, 1937 | 11 years, 305 days | First Jewish woman in Congress. Lost reelection |
| William W. Cohen (1874–1940) | Democratic | NY-17 | March 4, 1927 | March 4, 1929 | 2 years, 0 days | Retired |
| William I. Sirovich (1882–1939) | Democratic | NY-14 | March 4, 1927 | December 17, 1939 | 10 years, 288 days | Died in office |
| Henry Ellenbogen (1900–1985) | Democratic | PA-33 | March 4, 1933 | January 3, 1938 | 4 years, 305 days | Resigned to take seat on the Allegheny County Court of Common Pleas to which he had been elected |
| Herman P. Kopplemann (1880–1957) | Democratic | CT-01 | March 4, 1933 | January 3, 1939 | 5 years, 305 days | Lost reelection |
| Herman P. Kopplemann (1880–1957) | Democratic | CT-01 | January 3, 1941 | January 3, 1943 | 2 years, 0 days | Lost reelection |
| Herman P. Kopplemann (1880–1957) | Democratic | CT-01 | January 3, 1945 | January 3, 1947 | 2 years, 0 days | Lost reelection |
| Theodore A. Peyser (1873–1937) | Democratic | NY-17 | March 4, 1933 | August 8, 1937 | 4 years, 157 days | Died in office |
| William M. Citron (1896–1976) | Democratic | CT-AL | January 3, 1935 | January 3, 1939 | 4 years, 0 days | Lost reelection |
| Leon Sacks (1902–1972) | Democratic | PA-01 | January 3, 1937 | January 3, 1943 | 6 years, 0 days | Lost reelection |
| Morris Michael Edelstein (1888–1941) | Democratic | NY-14 | February 6, 1940 | June 4, 1941 | 1 year, 118 days | Died in office |
| Samuel A. Weiss (1902–1977) | Democratic | PA (several) | January 3, 1941 | January 7, 1946 | 5 years, 4 days | Resigned to take seat on the Allegheny County Court of Common Pleas to which he had been elected |
| Arthur George Klein (1904–1968) | Democratic | NY-14 | July 29, 1941 | January 3, 1945 | 3 years, 158 days | Retired |
| Arthur George Klein (1904–1968) | Democratic | NY-19 | February 19, 1946 | December 31, 1956 | 10 years, 316 days | Resigned to take seat on the New York Supreme Court to which he had been elected |
| Daniel Ellison (1886–1960) | Republican | MD-04 | January 3, 1943 | January 3, 1945 | 2 years, 0 days | Lost reelection |
| Benjamin J. Rabin (1896–1969) | Democratic | NY-24 | January 3, 1945 | December 31, 1947 | 2 years, 362 days | Resigned to take seat on the New York Supreme Court to which he had been elected |
| Leo F. Rayfiel (1888–1978) | Democratic | NY-14 | January 3, 1945 | September 13, 1947 | 2 years, 253 days | Resigned to take seat on the U.S. District Court for the Eastern District of New York to which he had been appointed and confirmed |
| Jacob K. Javits (1904–1986) | Republican | NY-21 | January 3, 1947 | December 31, 1954 | 7 years, 362 days | Resigned to become New York Attorney General |
| Abraham J. Multer (1900–1986) | Democratic | NY-14 (from 1947); NY-13 (from 1953) | November 4, 1947 | December 31, 1967 | 20 years, 57 days | Resigned to take seat on the New York Supreme Court to which he had been elected |
| Leo Isacson (1910–1996) | American Labor | NY-24 | February 17, 1948 | January 3, 1949 | 321 days | Lost reelection |
| Earl Chudoff (1907–1993) | Democratic | PA-04 | January 3, 1949 | January 5, 1958 | 9 years, 2 days | Resigned to take seat on the Philadelphia Court of Common Pleas to which he had been elected |
| Isidore Dollinger (1903–2000) | Democratic | NY-26 | January 3, 1949 | December 31, 1959 | 10 years, 362 days | Resigned to become Bronx County District Attorney |
| Abraham A. Ribicoff (1910–1998) | Democratic | CT-01 | January 3, 1949 | January 3, 1953 | 4 years, 0 days | Retired to run unsuccessfully for the United States Senate |
| Sidney R. Yates (1909–2000) | Democratic | IL-09 | January 3, 1949 | January 3, 1963 | 14 years, 0 days | Retired to run unsuccessfully for the United States Senate |
| Sidney R. Yates (1909–2000) | Democratic | IL-09 | January 3, 1965 | January 3, 1999 | 34 years, 0 days | Retired |
| Leonard Irving (1898–1962) | Democratic | MO-04 | January 3, 1949 | January 3, 1953 | 4 years, 0 days | Lost renomination |
| Louis B. Heller (1905–1993) | Democratic | NY-07 (from 1949); NY-08 (from 1953) | February 15, 1949 | July 21, 1954 | 5 years, 156 days | Resigned to take seat on the New York Court of Special Sessions |
| Sidney A. Fine (1903–1982) | Democratic | NY-23 (from 1951); NY-22 (from 1953) | January 3, 1951 | January 2, 1956 | 4 years, 364 days | Resigned to take seat on the New York Supreme Court |
| Samuel Friedel (1898–1979) | Democratic | MD-07 | January 3, 1953 | January 3, 1971 | 18 years, 0 days | Lost renomination |
| Lester Holtzman (1913–2002) | Democratic | NY-06 | January 3, 1953 | December 31, 1961 | 8 years, 362 days | Resigned to take seat on the New York Supreme Court to which he had been elected |
| Irwin D. Davidson (1906–1981) | Democratic | NY-20 | January 3, 1955 | December 31, 1956 | 1 year, 363 days | Resigned to take seat on the New York Court of General Sessions |
| Herbert Zelenko (1906–1979) | Democratic | NY-21 | January 3, 1955 | January 3, 1963 | 8 years, 0 days | Lost renomination |
| Leonard Farbstein (1902–1993) | Democratic | NY-19 | January 3, 1957 | January 3, 1971 | 14 years, 0 days | Lost renomination |
| Ludwig Teller (1911–1965) | Democratic | NY-20 | January 3, 1957 | January 3, 1961 | 4 years, 0 days | Lost renomination |
| Seymour Halpern (1913–1997) | Republican | NY-04 (from 1959); NY-06 (from 1963) | January 3, 1959 | January 3, 1973 | 14 years, 0 days | Retired |
| Herman Toll (1907–1967) | Democratic | PA-06 (from 1959); PA-04 (from 1963) | January 3, 1959 | January 3, 1967 | 8 years, 0 days | Retired |
| Jacob H. Gilbert (1920–1981) | Democratic | NY-23 (from 1960); NY-22 (from 1963) | March 8, 1960 | January 3, 1971 | 10 years, 301 days | Lost renomination |
| Charles Samuel Joelson (1916–1999) | Democratic | NJ-08 | January 3, 1961 | September 4, 1969 | 8 years, 244 days | Resigned to take seat on the New Jersey Superior Court to which he had been appointed |
| Benjamin Stanley Rosenthal (1923–1983) | Democratic | NY (several) | February 20, 1962 | January 4, 1983 | 20 years, 318 days | Died in office |
| Richard Ottinger (1929–2026) | Democratic | NY-25 | January 3, 1965 | January 3, 1971 | 6 years, 0 days | Retired to run unsuccessfully for the United States Senate |
| Richard Ottinger (1929–2026) | Democratic | NY-24 (from 1975); NY-20 (from 1983) | January 3, 1975 | January 3, 1985 | 10 years, 0 days | Retired |
| Joseph Y. Resnick (1924–1969) | Democratic | NY-28 | January 3, 1965 | January 3, 1969 | 4 years, 0 days | Retired to run unsuccessfully for the Democratic nomination for United States Senate |
| James H. Scheuer (1920–2005) | Democratic | NY-21 | January 3, 1965 | January 3, 1973 | 8 years, 0 days | Lost renomination |
| James H. Scheuer (1920–2005) | Democratic | NY-11 (from 1975); NY-8 (from 1983) | January 3, 1975 | January 3, 1993 | 18 years, 0 days | Retired |
| Herbert Tenzer (1905–1993) | Democratic | NY-05 | January 3, 1965 | January 3, 1969 | 4 years, 0 days | Retired |
| Lester L. Wolff (1919–2021) | Democratic | NY-03 (from 1965); NY-06 (from 1973) | January 3, 1965 | January 3, 1981 | 16 years, 0 days | Lost reelection |
| Joshua Eilberg (1921–2004) | Democratic | PA-04 | January 3, 1967 | January 3, 1979 | 12 years, 0 days | Lost reelection |
| Sam Steiger (1929–2012) | Republican | AZ-03 | January 3, 1967 | January 3, 1977 | 10 years, 0 days | Retired to run unsuccessfully for the United States Senate |
| Bertram L. Podell (1925–2005) | Democratic | NY-13 | February 20, 1968 | January 3, 1975 | 6 years, 317 days | Lost renomination |
| Ed Koch (1924–2013) | Democratic | NY-17 (from 1969); NY-18 (from 1973) | January 3, 1969 | December 31, 1977 | 8 years, 362 days | Resigned to become Mayor of New York City |
| Allard K. Lowenstein (1929–1980) | Democratic | NY-05 | January 3, 1969 | January 3, 1971 | 2 years, 0 days | Lost reelection |
| Abner J. Mikva (1926–2016) | Democratic | IL-02 | January 3, 1969 | January 3, 1973 | 4 years, 0 days | Lost reelection |
| Abner J. Mikva (1926–2016) | Democratic | IL-10 | January 3, 1975 | September 26, 1979 | 4 years, 266 days | Resigned to take seat on the U.S. Court of Appeals for the D.C. Circuit to which he had been appointed and confirmed |
| Bella Abzug (1920–1998) | Democratic | NY-19 (from 1971); NY-20 (from 1973) | January 3, 1971 | January 3, 1977 | 6 years, 0 days | Retired to run unsuccessfully for the Democratic nomination for the United States Senate |
| Benjamin Gilman (1922–2016) | Republican | NY (several) | January 3, 1973 | January 3, 2003 | 30 years, 0 days | Retired |
| Elizabeth Holtzman (born 1941) | Democratic | NY-16 | January 3, 1973 | January 3, 1981 | 8 years, 0 days | Retired to run unsuccessfully for the United States Senate |
| William Lehman (1913–2005) | Democratic | FL-13 (from 1973); FL-17 (from 1983) | January 3, 1973 | January 3, 1993 | 20 years, 0 days | Retired |
| Edward Mezvinsky (born 1937) | Democratic | IA-01 | January 3, 1973 | January 3, 1977 | 4 years, 0 days | Lost reelection |
| William Cohen (born 1940) | Republican | ME-2 | January 3, 1973 | January 3, 1979 | 6 years, 0 days | Retired to run successfully for United States Senate |
| Bill Gradison (born 1928) | Republican | OH-01 (from 1975); OH-02 (from 1983) | January 3, 1975 | January 31, 1993 | 18 years, 28 days | Resigned |
| John Hans Krebs (1926–2014) | Democratic | CA-17 | January 3, 1975 | January 3, 1979 | 4 years, 0 days | Lost reelection |
| Elliott H. Levitas (1930–2022) | Democratic | GA-04 | January 3, 1975 | January 3, 1985 | 10 years, 0 days | Lost reelection |
| Fred Richmond (1923–2019) | Democratic | NY-14 | January 3, 1975 | August 25, 1982 | 7 years, 234 days | Resigned |
| Stephen Solarz (1940–2010) | Democratic | NY-13 | January 3, 1975 | January 3, 1993 | 18 years, 0 days | Lost renomination |
| Gladys Spellman (1918–1988) | Democratic | MD-05 | January 3, 1975 | February 24, 1981 | 6 years, 52 days | Seat declared vacant after suffering a debilitating heart attack and becoming comatose |
| Henry Waxman (born 1939) | Democratic | CA (several) | January 3, 1975 | January 3, 2015 | 40 years, 0 days | Retired |
| Anthony Beilenson (1932–2017) | Democratic | CA-23 (from 1977); CA-24 (from 1993) | January 3, 1977 | January 3, 1997 | 20 years, 0 days | Retired |
| Mickey Edwards (born 1937) | Republican | OK-05 | January 3, 1977 | January 3, 1993 | 16 years, 0 days | Lost renomination |
| Dan Glickman (born 1944) | Democratic | KS-04 | January 3, 1977 | January 3, 1995 | 18 years, 0 days | Lost reelection |
| Marc L. Marks (1927–2018) | Republican | PA-24 | January 3, 1977 | January 3, 1983 | 6 years, 0 days | Retired |
| Ted Weiss (1927–1992) | Democratic | NY-20 (from 1977); NY-17 (from 1983) | January 3, 1977 | September 14, 1992 | 15 years, 255 days | Died in office |
| Bill Green (1929–2002) | Republican | NY-18 (from 1978); NY-15 (from 1983) | February 14, 1978 | January 3, 1993 | 14 years, 324 days | Lost reelection |
| Martin Frost (born 1942) | Democratic | TX-24 | January 3, 1979 | January 3, 2005 | 26 years, 0 days | Lost reelection |
| Ken Kramer (born 1942) | Republican | CO-05 | January 3, 1979 | January 3, 1987 | 8 years, 0 days | Retired to run unsuccessfully for the United States Senate |
| Howard Wolpe (1939–2011) | Democratic | MI-03 | January 3, 1979 | January 3, 1993 | 14 years, 0 days | Retired |
| Bobbi Fiedler (1937–2019) | Republican | CA-21 | January 3, 1981 | January 3, 1987 | 6 years, 0 days | Retired to run unsuccessfully for the Republican nomination for the United States Senate |
| Barney Frank (1940–2026) | Democratic | MA-04 | January 3, 1981 | January 3, 2013 | 32 years, 0 days | Retired |
| Sam Gejdenson (born 1948) | Democratic | CT-02 | January 3, 1981 | January 3, 2001 | 20 years, 0 days | Lost reelection |
| Tom Lantos (1928–2008) | Democratic | CA-11 (from 1981); CA-12 (from 1993) | January 3, 1981 | February 11, 2008 | 27 years, 39 days | Died in office; the only Holocaust survivor to have served in the United States Congress. |
| Chuck Schumer (born 1950) | Democratic | NY (several) | January 3, 1981 | January 3, 1999 | 18 years, 0 days | Retired to run successfully for the United States Senate |
| Bob Shamansky (1927–2011) | Democratic | OH-12 | January 3, 1981 | January 3, 1983 | 2 years, 0 days | Lost reelection |
| Ron Wyden (born 1949) | Democratic | OR-03 | January 3, 1981 | February 5, 1996 | 15 years, 33 days | Resigned after being elected to the United States Senate |
| Howard Berman (born 1941) | Democratic | CA-26 (from 1983); CA-28 (from 2003) | January 3, 1983 | January 3, 2013 | 30 years, 0 days | Lost reelection |
| Barbara Boxer (born 1940) | Democratic | CA-06 | January 3, 1983 | January 3, 1993 | 10 years, 0 days | Retired to run successfully for the United States Senate |
| Ben Erdreich (born 1938) | Democratic | AL-06 | January 3, 1983 | January 3, 1993 | 10 years, 0 days | Lost reelection |
| Sander Levin (born 1931) | Democratic | MI (several) | January 3, 1983 | January 3, 2019 | 36 years, 0 days | Retired |
| Mel Levine (born 1943) | Democratic | CA-27 | January 3, 1983 | January 3, 1993 | 10 years, 0 days | Retired to run unsuccessfully for the Democratic nomination for the United States Senate |
| Norman Sisisky (1927–2001) | Democratic | VA-04 | January 3, 1983 | March 29, 2001 | 18 years, 85 days | Died in office |
| Lawrence J. Smith (1941–2026) | Democratic | FL-16 | January 3, 1983 | January 3, 1993 | 10 years, 0 days | Retired |
| Gary Ackerman (born 1942) | Democratic | NY-07 (from 1983); NY-05 (from 1993) | March 1, 1983 | January 3, 2013 | 30 years, 0 days | Retired |
| Sala Burton (1925–1987) | Democratic | CA-05 | June 21, 1983 | February 1, 1987 | 3 years, 225 days | Died in office |
| John Miller (1938–2017) | Republican | WA-01 | January 3, 1985 | January 3, 1993 | 8 years, 0 days | Retired |
| Ben Cardin (born 1943) | Democratic | MD-03 | January 3, 1987 | January 3, 2007 | 20 years, 0 days | Retired to run successfully for the United States Senate |
| Eliot Engel (1947–2026) | Democratic | NY (several) | January 3, 1989 | January 3, 2021 | 32 years, 0 days | Lost renomination |
| Nita Lowey (1937–2025) | Democratic | NY (several) | January 3, 1989 | January 3, 2021 | 32 years, 0 days | Retired |
| Steven Schiff (1947–1998) | Republican | NM-01 | January 3, 1989 | March 25, 1998 | 9 years, 81 days | Died in office |
| Bernie Sanders (born 1941) | Independent | VT-AL | January 3, 1991 | January 3, 2007 | 16 years, 0 days | Retired to run successfully for the United States Senate |
| Dick Zimmer (1944–2025) | Republican | NJ-12 | January 3, 1991 | January 3, 1997 | 6 years, 0 days | Retired to run unsuccessfully for the United States Senate |
| Jerry Nadler (born 1947) | Democratic | NY (several) | November 3, 1992 | January 3, 2027 | 34 years, 9 days | Retiring |
| Sam Coppersmith (born 1955) | Democratic | AZ-01 | January 3, 1993 | January 3, 1995 | 2 years, 0 days | Retired to run unsuccessfully for the United States Senate |
| Peter Deutsch (born 1957) | Democratic | FL-20 | January 3, 1993 | January 3, 2005 | 12 years, 0 days | Retired to run unsuccessfully for the Democratic nomination for the United States Senate |
| Bob Filner (1942–2025) | Democratic | CA-50 (from 1993); CA-51 (from 2003) | January 3, 1993 | December 3, 2012 | 19 years, 335 days | Resigned to become mayor of San Diego |
| Eric Fingerhut (born 1959) | Democratic | OH-19 | January 3, 1993 | January 3, 1995 | 2 years, 0 days | Lost reelection |
| Daniel Hamburg (born 1948) | Democratic | CA-01 | January 3, 1993 | January 3, 1995 | 2 years, 0 days | Lost reelection |
| Jane Harman (born 1945) | Democratic | CA-36 | January 3, 1993 | January 3, 1999 | 6 years, 0 days | Retired to run unsuccessfully for the Democratic nomination for Governor of California |
| Jane Harman (born 1945) | Democratic | CA-36 | January 3, 2001 | February 28, 2011 | 10 years, 56 days | Resigned to head the Woodrow Wilson International Center for Scholars |
| Herb Klein (1930–2023) | Democratic | NJ-08 | January 3, 1993 | January 3, 1995 | 2 years, 0 days | Lost reelection |
| David A. Levy (born 1953) | Republican | NY-04 | January 3, 1993 | January 3, 1995 | 2 years, 0 days | Lost renomination |
| Marjorie Margolies (born 1942) | Democratic | PA-13 | January 3, 1993 | January 3, 1995 | 2 years, 0 days | Lost reelection |
| Lynn Schenk (born 1945) | Democratic | CA-49 | January 3, 1993 | January 3, 1995 | 2 years, 0 days | Lost reelection |
| Jon D. Fox (1947–2018) | Republican | PA-13 | January 3, 1995 | January 3, 1999 | 4 years, 0 days | Lost reelection |
| Steve Rothman (born 1952) | Democratic | NJ-09 | January 3, 1997 | January 3, 2013 | 16 years, 0 days | Lost renomination |
| Brad Sherman (born 1954) | Democratic | CA (several) | January 3, 1997 | Incumbent | 29 years, 313 days | |
| Robert Wexler (born 1961) | Democratic | FL-19 | January 3, 1997 | January 3, 2010 | 13 years, 0 days | Resigned |
| Shelley Berkley (born 1951) | Democratic | NV-01 | January 3, 1999 | January 3, 2013 | 14 years, 0 days | Retired to run unsuccessfully for the United States Senate |
| Jan Schakowsky (born 1944) | Democratic | IL-09 | January 3, 1999 | January 3, 2027 | 27 years, 313 days | Retiring |
| Anthony Weiner (born 1964) | Democratic | NY-09 | January 3, 1999 | June 21, 2011 | 12 years, 169 days | Resigned |
| Eric Cantor (born 1963) | Republican | VA-07 | January 3, 2001 | August 18, 2014 | 13 years, 227 days | Resigned after having lost renomination; first Jewish House Majority Leader |
| Susan Davis (born 1944) | Democratic | CA-51 (from 2001); CA-53 (from 2003) | January 3, 2001 | January 3, 2021 | 20 years, 0 days | Retired |
| Steve Israel (born 1958) | Democratic | NY-02 (from 2001); NY-03 (from 2013) | January 3, 2001 | January 3, 2017 | 16 years, 0 days | Retired |
| Adam Schiff (born 1960) | Democratic | CA (several) | January 3, 2001 | December 9, 2024 | 23 years, 341 days | Resigned to take seat as U.S. senator |
| Rahm Emanuel (born 1959) | Democratic | IL-05 | January 3, 2003 | January 2, 2009 | 5 years, 365 days | Resigned to become White House Chief of Staff |
| Debbie Wasserman Schultz (born 1966) | Democratic | FL-20 (from 2005); FL-23 (from 2013); FL-25 (from 2023) | January 3, 2005 | Incumbent | 21 years, 313 days | |
| Allyson Schwartz (born 1948) | Democratic | PA-13 | January 3, 2005 | January 3, 2015 | 10 years, 0 days | Retired to run unsuccessfully for the Democratic nomination for Governor of Pennsylvania |
| Steve Cohen (born 1949) | Democratic | TN-09 | January 3, 2007 | January 3, 2027 | 19 years, 313 days | Retiring |
| Gabby Giffords (born 1970) | Democratic | AZ-08 | January 3, 2007 | January 25, 2012 | 5 years, 22 days | Resigned to recover from the assassination attempt on her life in 2011 |
| Paul Hodes (born 1951) | Democratic | NH-02 | January 3, 2007 | January 3, 2011 | 4 years, 0 days | Retired to run unsuccessfully for the United States Senate |
| Steve Kagen (born 1949) | Democratic | WI-08 | January 3, 2007 | January 3, 2011 | 4 years, 0 days | Lost reelection |
| Ron Klein (born 1957) | Democratic | FL-22 | January 3, 2007 | January 3, 2011 | 4 years, 0 days | Lost reelection |
| John Yarmuth (born 1947) | Democratic | KY-03 | January 3, 2007 | January 3, 2023 | 16 years, 0 days | Retired |
| John Adler (1959–2011) | Democratic | NJ-03 | January 3, 2009 | January 3, 2011 | 2 years, 0 days | Lost reelection |
| Jason Chaffetz (Note: Raised Jewish from birth by his Jewish father, but later converted to Mormonism.) (born 1967) | Republican | UT-03 | January 3, 2009 | June 30, 2017 | 8 years, 178 days | Resigned |
| Alan Grayson (born 1958) | Democratic | FL-08 | January 3, 2009 | January 3, 2011 | 2 years, 0 days | Lost reelection |
| Alan Grayson (born 1958) | Democratic | FL-09 | January 3, 2013 | January 3, 2017 | 4 years, 0 days | Retired to run unsuccessfully for the Democratic nomination to the United States Senate |
| Jared Polis (born 1975) | Democratic | CO-02 | January 3, 2009 | January 3, 2019 | 10 years, 0 days | Retired to run successfully for Governor of Colorado |
| Ted Deutch (born 1966) | Democratic | FL-19 (from 2010); FL-21 (from 2013); FL-22 (from 2017) | April 13, 2010 | September 30, 2022 | 12 years, 170 days | Resigned to become CEO of the American Jewish Committee |
| David Cicilline (born 1961) | Democratic | RI-01 | January 3, 2011 | May 31, 2023 | 12 years, 148 days | Resigned to become CEO of the Rhode Island Foundation |
| Suzanne Bonamici (born 1954) | Democratic | OR-01 | January 31, 2012 | Incumbent | 14 years, 285 days | |
| Lois Frankel (born 1948) | Democratic | FL-22 (from 2013); FL-21 (from 2017); FL-22 (from 2023) | January 3, 2013 | Incumbent | 13 years, 313 days | |
| Alan Lowenthal (born 1941) | Democratic | CA-47 | January 3, 2013 | January 3, 2023 | 10 years, 0 days | Retired |
| Brad Schneider (born 1961) | Democratic | IL-10 | January 3, 2013 | January 3, 2015 | 2 years, 0 days | Lost reelection |
| Brad Schneider (born 1961) | Democratic | IL-10 | January 3, 2017 | Incumbent | 9 years, 313 days | |
| Lee Zeldin (born 1980) | Republican | NY-01 | January 3, 2015 | January 3, 2023 | 8 years, 0 days | Retired to run unsuccessfully for Governor of New York |
| Josh Gottheimer (born 1975) | Democratic | NJ-05 | January 3, 2017 | Incumbent | 9 years, 313 days | |
| David Kustoff (born 1966) | Republican | TN-08 | January 3, 2017 | Incumbent | 9 years, 313 days | |
| Jamie Raskin (born 1962) | Democratic | MD-08 | January 3, 2017 | Incumbent | 9 years, 313 days | |
| Jacky Rosen (born 1957) | Democratic | NV-03 | January 3, 2017 | January 3, 2019 | 2 years, 0 days | Retired to run successfully for the United States Senate |
| Susan Wild (born 1957) | Democratic | PA-15 (from 2018); PA-07 (from 2019) | November 27, 2018 | January 3, 2025 | 6 years, 37 days | Lost reelection |
| Andy Levin (born 1960) | Democratic | MI-09 | January 3, 2019 | January 3, 2023 | 4 years, 0 days | Lost renomination after redistricting |
| Mike Levin (Note: With a Jewish father and Catholic mother, he was baptized as a Catholic but "was raised with both the Catholic faith and also the Jewish faith.") (born 1978) | Democratic | CA-49 | January 3, 2019 | Incumbent | 7 years, 313 days | |
| Elaine Luria (born 1975) | Democratic | VA-02 | January 3, 2019 | January 3, 2023 | 4 years, 0 days | Lost reelection |
| Dean Phillips (born 1969) | Democratic | MN-03 | January 3, 2019 | January 3, 2025 | 6 years, 0 days | Retired to run unsuccessfully for the Democratic nomination for President of the United States |
| Max Rose (born 1986) | Democratic | NY-11 | January 3, 2019 | January 3, 2021 | 2 years, 0 days | Lost reelection |
| Kim Schrier (born 1968) | Democratic | WA-08 | January 3, 2019 | Incumbent | 7 years, 313 days | |
| Elissa Slotkin (born 1976) | Democratic | MI-08 (from 2019); MI-07 (from 2023) | January 3, 2019 | January 3, 2025 | 6 years, 0 days | Retired to run successfully for the United States Senate |
| Jake Auchincloss (born 1988) | Democratic | MA-04 | January 3, 2021 | Incumbent | 5 years, 313 days | |
| Sara Jacobs (born 1989) | Democratic | CA-51 (from 2023); CA-53 (from 2021) | January 3, 2021 | Incumbent | 5 years, 313 days | |
| Kathy Manning (born 1956) | Democratic | NC-06 | January 3, 2021 | January 3, 2025 | 4 years, 0 days | Retired |
| Becca Balint (born 1968) | Democratic | VT-AL | January 3, 2023 | Incumbent | 3 years, 313 days | |
| Dan Goldman (born 1976) | Democratic | NY-10 | January 3, 2023 | January 3, 2027 | 3 years, 313 days | Lost renomination |
| Greg Landsman (born 1976) | Democratic | OH-01 | January 3, 2023 | Incumbent | 3 years, 313 days | |
| Seth Magaziner (born 1983) | Democratic | RI-02 | January 3, 2023 | Incumbent | 3 years, 313 days | |
| Max Miller (born 1988) | Republican | OH-07 | January 3, 2023 | January 3, 2027 | 3 years, 313 days | Lost reelection |
| Jared Moskowitz (born 1980) | Democratic | FL-23 | January 3, 2023 | Incumbent | 3 years, 313 days | |
| Laura Friedman (born 1966) | Democratic | CA-30 | January 3, 2025 | Incumbent | 1 year, 313 days | |
| Craig Goldman (born 1968) | Republican | TX-12 | January 3, 2025 | Incumbent | 1 year, 313 days | |
| Eugene Vindman (born 1975) | Democratic | VA-07 | January 3, 2025 | Incumbent | 1 year, 313 days | |
| Randy Fine (born 1974) | Republican | FL-06 | April 2, 2025 | Incumbent | 1 year, 224 days | |

=== Elected to the House of Representatives, representative-elect ===
| Name | Party | District | Start | Notes |
|---|---|---|---|---|
| Daniel Biss (born 1977) | Democratic | IL-9 | January 3, 2027 | Elect |
| Zach Dembo (born 1985) | Democratic | KY-06 | January 3, 2027 | Elect |
| Sam Forstag (born 1994) | Democratic | MT-01 | January 3, 2027 | Elect |
| Brad Lander (born 1969) | Democratic | NY-10 | January 3, 2027 | Elect |
| Micah Lasher (born 1981) | Democratic | NY-12 | January 3, 2027 | Elect |
| Elaine Luria (born 1975) | Democratic | VA-2 | January 3, 2027 | Elect |
| Jeremy Moss (born 1986) | Democratic | MI-11 | January 3, 2027 | Elect |
| Scott Wiener (born 1970) | Democratic | CA-11 | January 3, 2027 | Elect |

=== Elected to the House of Representatives, but not seated ===
| Name | Party | District | Year elected | Notes | | | | | |
|---|---|---|---|---|---|---|---|---|---|
| Name | Party | District | Year elected | Notes | David Levy Yulee (Note: Born (and raised) Jewish, but converted to Episcopalianism in his mid-to-late 30s) (1810–1886) | Democratic | FL-AL | 1845 | "Did not take his seat in the House" when elected to the Senate |
| Samuel Marx (1867–1922) | Democratic | NY-19 | 1922 | Not seated due to death prior to start of term | | | | | |

=== Territorial delegates ===
| Name | Party | Territory | Term | | | Notes |
| Name | Party | Territory | Start | End | Duration | Notes |
|---|---|---|---|---|---|---|
| David Levy Yulee (1810–1886) | Democratic | Florida | March 4, 1841 | March 3, 1845 | 3 years, 364 days | Office eliminated when Territory of Florida was admitted to the Union as the State of Florida |

=== List of states with Jewish U.S. representatives ===
Map of Jewish House members serving in the 119th Congress. Districts colored in blue have a Jewish incumbent.

| State | Current | Previous | Total | First |
|---|---|---|---|---|
| Alabama | 0 | 2 | 2 | Philip Phillips |
| Alaska | 0 | 0 | 0 | |
| Arizona | 0 | 3 | 3 | Sam Steiger |
| Arkansas | 0 | 0 | 0 | |
| California | 4 | 18 | 22 | Julius Kahn |
| Colorado | 0 | 2 | 2 | Ken Kramer |
| Connecticut | 0 | 4 | 4 | Herman Kopplemann |
| Delaware | 0 | 0 | 0 | |
| Florida | 4 | 7 | 11 | William Lehman |
| Georgia | 0 | 1 | 1 | Elliott Levitas |
| Hawaii | 0 | 0 | 0 | |
| Idaho | 0 | 0 | 0 | |
| Illinois | 2 | 7 | 9 | Julius Goldzier |
| Indiana | 0 | 1 | 1 | Milton Kraus |
| Iowa | 0 | 1 | 1 | Edward Mezvinsky |
| Kansas | 0 | 1 | 1 | Dan Glickman |
| Kentucky | 0 | 1 | 1 | John Yarmuth |
| Louisiana | 0 | 3 | 3 | Michael Hahn |
| Maine | 0 | 1 | 1 | William Cohen |
| Maryland | 1 | 6 | 7 | Isidor Rayner |
| Massachusetts | 1 | 2 | 3 | Leopold Morse |
| Michigan | 0 | 5 | 5 | Julius Houseman |
| Minnesota | 0 | 1 | 1 | Dean Phillips |
| Mississippi | 0 | 0 | 0 | |
| Missouri | 0 | 2 | 2 | Nathan Frank |
| Montana | 0 | 0 | 0 | |
| Nebraska | 0 | 0 | 0 | |
| Nevada | 0 | 2 | 2 | Shelley Berkley |
| New Hampshire | 0 | 1 | 1 | Paul Hodes |
| New Jersey | 1 | 6 | 7 | Isaac Bacharach |
| New Mexico | 0 | 1 | 1 | Steven Schiff |
| New York | 2 | 66 | 68 | Emanuel Hart |
| North Carolina | 0 | 1 | 1 | Kathy Manning |
| North Dakota | 0 | 0 | 0 | |
| Ohio | 2 | 3 | 5 | Bill Gradison |
| Oklahoma | 0 | 1 | 1 | Mickey Edwards |
| Oregon | 1 | 1 | 2 | Ron Wyden |
| Pennsylvania | 0 | 16 | 16 | Lewis Charles Levin |
| Rhode Island | 1 | 1 | 2 | David Cicilline |
| South Carolina | 0 | 0 | 0 | |
| South Dakota | 0 | 0 | 0 | |
| Tennessee | 2 | 0 | 2 | Steve Cohen |
| Texas | 1 | 1 | 2 | Martin Frost |
| Utah | 0 | 1 | 1 | Jason Chaffetz |
| Vermont | 1 | 1 | 2 | Bernie Sanders |
| Virginia | 1 | 3 | 4 | Norman Sisisky |
| Washington | 1 | 1 | 2 | John Miller |
| West Virginia | 0 | 1 | 1 | Benjamin Rosenbloom |
| Wisconsin | 0 | 2 | 2 | Victor Berger |
| Wyoming | 0 | 0 | 0 | |
| Total | 25 | 177 | 202 | |

== See also ==
- Congressional Jewish Caucus
- List of Jewish American politicians
- List of Jewish United States Cabinet members

Others

- List of Buddhist members of the United States Congress
- List of Hindu members of the United States Congress
- List of Mormon members of the United States Congress
- List of Muslim members of the United States Congress
- List of Quaker members of the United States Congress
