= Smith-Johnson Steamship Corporation =

Former US Shipping Company

- Industry: Shipping, charter shipping
- Founded: 1921 in New York City, United States
- Fate: Sold 1955
- Key people: Howell B. Smith; Algot W. Johnson

Smith-Johnson Steamship Corporation, Smith & Johnson was founded by Howell B. Smith (1898–1979) and Algot W. Johnson (1900–1987) in 1921 in New York City. Howell B. Smith and Algot W. Johnson worked as ship brokers for the Munson Steamship Line before starting their own firm in 1921. Smith-Johnson Steamship Corporation's main work was as a shipbroker for Norwegian ships. During World War II Smith & Johnson operated ships to support the war effort, they also opened an office in New Orleans. Unlike other firms, they did not purchase any of the many surplus ships after the war. Smith and Johnson sold the firm in 1955, it continued to operate under other names till about 1982.

Howell B. Smith was born on July 4, 1898, in Rhode Island and raised in Norwood, New Jersey. Smith was in the United States Navy during World War I, from July 5, 1917, to April 5, 1921, Smith was a seaman on the USS Leviathan, a troopship. Smith second assignment in the Navy was as a coxswain with the 3rd Naval District in New York. Smith died on February 25, 1979, in New York City. Smith retired from Smith-Johnson Steamship Corporation in 1955. During World War II, from 1941 to 1944 he also worked at the emergency department the United States Maritime Commission. Smith-Johnson Steamship Corporation supported the war effort. Howell B. Smith also founded the Merchant Shipping Company.

Algot W. Johnson was born in Brooklyn, New York, on July 15, 1900. During World War I, he was for a short time in the United States Army. Algot W. Johnson's father, Charles Johnson, came to the United States from Sweden in 1891. Charles Johnson worked in a New York shipyard as a joiner. Algot W. Johnson died on October 19, 1987, in Palm Beach, Florida.

== World War II ==
Smith-Johnson Steamship Corporation fleet of ships that were used to help the World War II effort. During World War II Smith-Johnson Steamship Corporation operated Merchant navy ships for the United States Shipping Board. During World War II Smith-Johnson Steamship Corporation was active with charter shipping with the Maritime Commission and War Shipping Administration. Smith-Johnson Steamship Corporation operated Liberty ships and Victory ships for the merchant navy. The ship was run by its Smith-Johnson Steamship Corporation crew and the US Navy supplied United States Navy Armed Guards to man the deck guns and radio.

== Ships ==
Partial list of ships operated by Smith-Johnson:

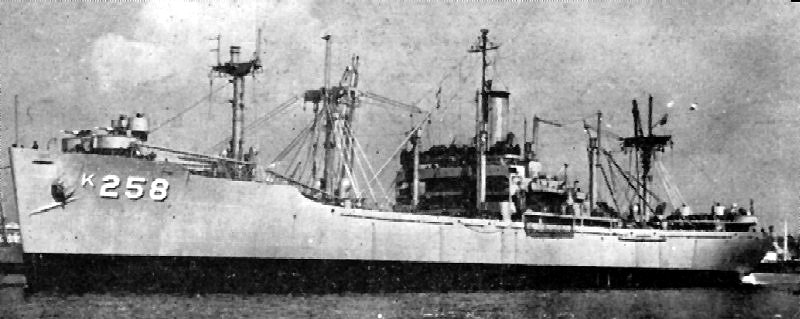
A Victory ship of World War II

Liberty ship of World War II

  - Liberty ships operated:
- SS Isaac Shelby, hit a mine, off the coast of Italy in January 1945.
- Matt W. Ransom, on April 15, 1943, was hit a mine laid by German submarine U-117 off Casablanca, made it to Gibraltar, and then to England. Too much damage to repair, she was sunk on June 8, 1944, as part of Gooseberry Harbour off Normandy beach.
- SS Ralph A. Cram
- Edward G. Janeway
- Edward K. Collins
- Wallace M. Tyler
- SS John B. Lennon
- Negley D. Cochran
- SS M. Michael Edelstein
- Joseph Lee
- Joshua Slocum
- James M. Porter
- John Gallup
- Fitzhugh Lee II
- Mathew B. Brady
- Edwin T. Meredith
- John A. Donald
- James M. Gillis
- David Belasco
- Frank C. Emerson
- Eloy Alfaro
- Thomas J. Lyons
- M. Michael Edelstein
  - Type N3 ship
- Edward Nickels, N3-S-A2

  - Victory ships operated:
- SS Williams Victory
- SS Muhlenberg Victory
  - Other
- SS Aenos (1944), was also SS Empire Contyne, 1,935 GRT cargo ship, was built by Flensburger Schiff-Gesellschaft in 1945 as Rodenbeck.

== See also ==
- World War II United States Merchant Navy
