= Samuel Mandelbaum =

US federal judge (1884–1946)

Judge of the United States District Court for the Southern District of New York
- In office June 22, 1936 – November 20, 1946
- Appointed by: Franklin D. Roosevelt
- Preceded by: Seat established by 49 Stat. 1491
- Succeeded by: Harold Medina

Personal details
- Born: Samuel Mandelbaum; September 20, 1884 Russian Empire
- Died: November 20, 1946 (aged 62) University Place, New York, U.S.
- Education: New York University School of Law (LL.B., LL.M.)

Samuel Mandelbaum (September 20, 1884 – November 20, 1946) was a United States district judge of the United States District Court for the Southern District of New York.

== Education and career ==
Born on September 20, 1884, in the Russian Empire, Mandelbaum received a Bachelor of Laws in 1912 from New York University School of Law and a Master of Laws in 1913 from the same institution. He entered private practice in New York City, New York from 1912 to 1923. He was a member of the New York State Assembly from 1923 to 1932 and a member of the New York State Senate from 1932 to 1936.

== Federal judicial service ==
Mandelbaum was nominated by President Franklin D. Roosevelt on June 15, 1936, to the United States District Court for the Southern District of New York, to a new seat authorized by 49 Stat. 1491. He was confirmed by the United States Senate on June 20, 1936, and received his commission on June 22, 1936. His service terminated on November 20, 1946, due to his death in University Place, New York.

== See also ==
- List of Jewish American jurists

== Sources ==
- Gould, Milton S. (1979), The Witness Who Spoke with God and Other Tales from the Courthouse, New York: Viking Press, ISBN 0-670-69158-5.
- Younger, Irving (1978), "What Happened in Erie", Texas Law Review, 56: 1011.

New York State Assembly
| Preceded by Samuel Dickstein | New York State Assembly New York County, 4th District; 1923–1932 | Succeeded by Leonard Farbstein |
New York State Senate
| Preceded by Edward J. Ahearn | New York State Senate 14th District; 1933–1936 | Succeeded by William J. Murray |
Legal offices
| Preceded by Seat established by 49 Stat. 1491 | Judge of the United States District Court for the Southern District of New York; 1936–1946 | Succeeded by Harold Medina |
