= Leo F. Rayfiel =

American lawyer, jurist, and politician

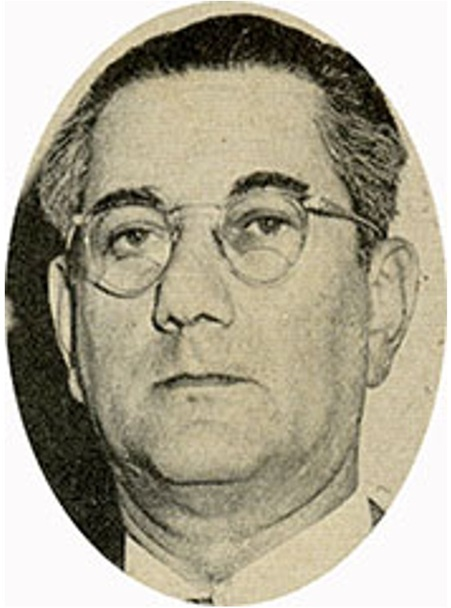
- 1947 photo of Rayfiel by Harris & Ewing

Senior Judge of the United States District Court for the Eastern District of New York
- In office March 4, 1966 – November 18, 1978

Judge of the United States District Court for the Eastern District of New York
- In office July 30, 1947 – March 4, 1966
- Appointed by: Harry S. Truman
- Preceded by: Grover M. Moscowitz
- Succeeded by: Jack B. Weinstein

Member of the U.S. House of Representatives from New York's 14th district
- In office January 3, 1945 – September 13, 1947
- Preceded by: Arthur G. Klein
- Succeeded by: Abraham J. Multer

Member of the New York State Assembly

Member of the U.S. House of Representatives from 's Kings County, 2nd district
- In office 1939–1944
- Preceded by: Benjamin Brenner
- Succeeded by: J. Sidney Levine

Personal details
- Born: Leo Frederick Rayfiel; March 22, 1888 New York City, U.S.
- Died: November 18, 1978 (aged 90) Wayne, New Jersey, U.S.
- Resting place: Wellwood Cemetery; West Babylon, New York
- Party: Democratic
- Spouse: Flora Marks (m. 1916)
- Children: 3 (including David Rayfiel)
- Education: New York University (LLB)
- Profession: Attorney

Leo Frederick Rayfiel (March 22, 1888 – November 18, 1978) was an American lawyer, jurist, and politician who served as a United States representative from New York for one term from 1945 to 1947. He served as a United States district judge of the United States District Court for the Eastern District of New York from 1947 to 1978.

== Early life ==
Leo F. Rayfiel was born in New York City on March 22, 1888, a son of Hyman Rafiel and Hannah Rich Rayfiel. Rayfiel was one of eight siblings who lived to adulthood, and his family moved to Brooklyn when Rayfiel was three years old, where he attended Brooklyn's Public School 84. He graduated from Boys High School in 1906. Rayfiel then attended the New York University School of Law, from which he received his Bachelor of Laws in 1908.

Rather than begin a legal career, Rayfiel toured the country as a traveling musician in a group that included Gus Edwards, George Jessel, and Eddie Cantor. He later worked as a salesman in the garment industry and was based in Atlanta. After two years managing a clothing store in Denver, in 1914 Rayfiel returned to Brooklyn and studied law in preparation for the bar exam.

=== Family ===
In June 1916, Rayfiel married Flora Marks, his former bookkeeper and the daughter of garment manufacturer Harris Marks. They were the parents of three sons. Robert worked as a chemical engineer. David was a well-known Hollywood screenwriter. Howard was an attorney and screenwriter who worked for many years as counsel to Desilu Studios.

== Career ==
Rayfiel attained admission to the bar in 1918. A specialist in real estate law, he practiced in Brooklyn from 1918 to 1945. A Democratic Party loyalist, in 1928, Rayfiel turned down a nomination for the New York State Assembly so he could continue practicing law. In 1938, Rayfiel won election to the Assembly, and he served from 1939 to 1944.

Rayfiel was elected to the 80th Congress in 1944. He won reelection to the 81st Congress and served from January 3, 1945, until resigning on September 13, 1947. On June 30, 1947, Rayfiel was nominated by President Harry S. Truman to the seat on the United States District Court for the Eastern District of New York that was vacated by Judge Grover M. Moscowitz. He was confirmed by the United States Senate on July 23, 1947, and received his commission on July 30, 1947. He assumed senior status on March 4, 1966.

Rayfiel's service ended on November 18, 1978, due to his death in Wayne, New Jersey. He was interred in Wellwood Cemetery in West Babylon, New York.

== See also ==
- List of Jewish members of the United States Congress
- List of Jewish American jurists

New York State Assembly
Preceded by Benjamin Brenner	New York State Assembly Kings County, 2nd District; 1939–1944	Succeeded by J. Sidney Levine
U.S. House of Representatives
Preceded by Arthur G. Klein	Member of the U.S. House of Representatives from New York's 14th congressional district 1945–1947	Succeeded by Abraham J. Multer
Legal offices
Preceded by Grover M. Moscowitz	Judge of the United States District Court for the Eastern District of New York; 1947–1966	Succeeded by Jack B. Weinstein
