= SS M. Michael Edelstein =

World War II Liberty ship of the United States

History

United States
- Name: M. Michael Edelstein
- Namesake: M. Michael Edelstein
- Owner: War Shipping Administration (WSA)
- Operator: Smith & Johnson Co.
- Ordered: as type (EC2-S-C1) hull, MC hull 2305
- Builder: J.A. Jones Construction, Panama City, Florida
- Cost: $949,954
- Yard number: 46
- Way number: 1
- Laid down: 28 April 1944
- Launched: 5 June 1944
- Sponsored by: Mrs. Dorothy Strom
- Completed: 22 June 1944
- Identification: Call Signal: WQEV
- Fate: Sold to Italy, 27 December 1945

Italy
- Name: Milano; Milano II
- Namesake: Milano
- Owner: Tirrenia Societe Italiana di Navigazione, Naples, Italy
- Acquired: 1946
- Fate: Sold, 1954

Italy
- Name: Merit
- Owner: Societa in Nome Colletivo Fratelli Lo Faro di Giovanni, Genoa, Italy
- Acquired: 1954
- Fate: Sold, 1956

Italy
- Name: Albaro
- Owner: Fratelli Lo Faro di Giovanni, Genoa, Italy
- Acquired: 1956
- Fate: Sold, 1963

Italy
- Name: Maria Bottiglieri
- Owner: Giovanni Bottiglieri, Naples, Italy
- Acquired: 22 January 1947
- Fate: Scrapped, 1969

General characteristics
- Class & type: Liberty ship; type EC2-S-C1, standard
- Tonnage: 10,865 LT DWT; 7,176 GRT
- Displacement: 3,380 long tons (3,434 t) (light); 14,245 long tons (14,474 t) (max)
- Length: 441 feet 6 inches (135 m) oa; 416 feet (127 m) pp; 427 feet (130 m) lwl
- Beam: 57 feet (17 m)
- Draft: 27 ft 9.25 in (8.4646 m)
- Installed power: 2 × Oil fired 450 °F (232 °C) boilers, operating at 220 psi (1,500 kPa); 2,500 hp (1,900 kW)
- Propulsion: 1 × triple-expansion steam engine, (manufactured by General Machinery Corp., Hamilton, Ohio); 1 × screw propeller
- Speed: 11.5 knots (21.3 km/h; 13.2 mph)
- Capacity: 562,608 cubic feet (15,931 m^{3}) (grain); 499,573 cubic feet (14,146 m^{3}) (bale)
- Complement: 38–62 USMM; 21–40 USNAG
- Armament: Varied by ship; Bow-mounted 3-inch (76 mm)/50-caliber gun; Stern-mounted 4-inch (102 mm)/50-caliber gun; 2–8 × single 20-millimeter (0.79 in) Oerlikon anti-aircraft (AA) cannons and/or, 2–8 × 37-millimeter (1.46 in) M1 AA guns

SS M. Michael Edelstein was a Liberty ship built in the United States during World War II. She was named after M. Michael Edelstein, a member of the U.S. House of Representatives from New York's 14th district.

== Construction ==
M. Michael Edelstein was laid down on 28 April 1944, under a Maritime Commission (MARCOM) contract, MC hull 2305, by J.A. Jones Construction, Panama City, Florida; she was sponsored by Mrs. Dorothy Strom, and launched on 5 June 1944.

== History ==
She was allocated to Smith & Johnson Co., on 22 June 1944. On 27 December 1945, she was transferred to the Italian Government, which in turn sold her for $553,253.57 to Tirrenia Societe Italiana di Navigazione, Naples, Italy, for commercial use. She was renamed Milano. After being sold to three more Italian owners she was scrapped in Spezia, Italy, in 1969.

== Bibliography ==
- "Jones Construction, Panama City FL". www.ShipbuildingHistory.com. 13 October 2010.
- "Liberty Ships – World War II".
- Maritime Administration. "M. Michael Edelstein". Ship History Database Vessel Status Card. U.S. Department of Transportation, Maritime Administration. Archived from the original on 12 December 2019.
- Davies, James (May 2004). "Specifications (As-Built)" (PDF). p. 23.
- "SS M. Michael Edelstein ".
