= John Kronmiller =

American politician

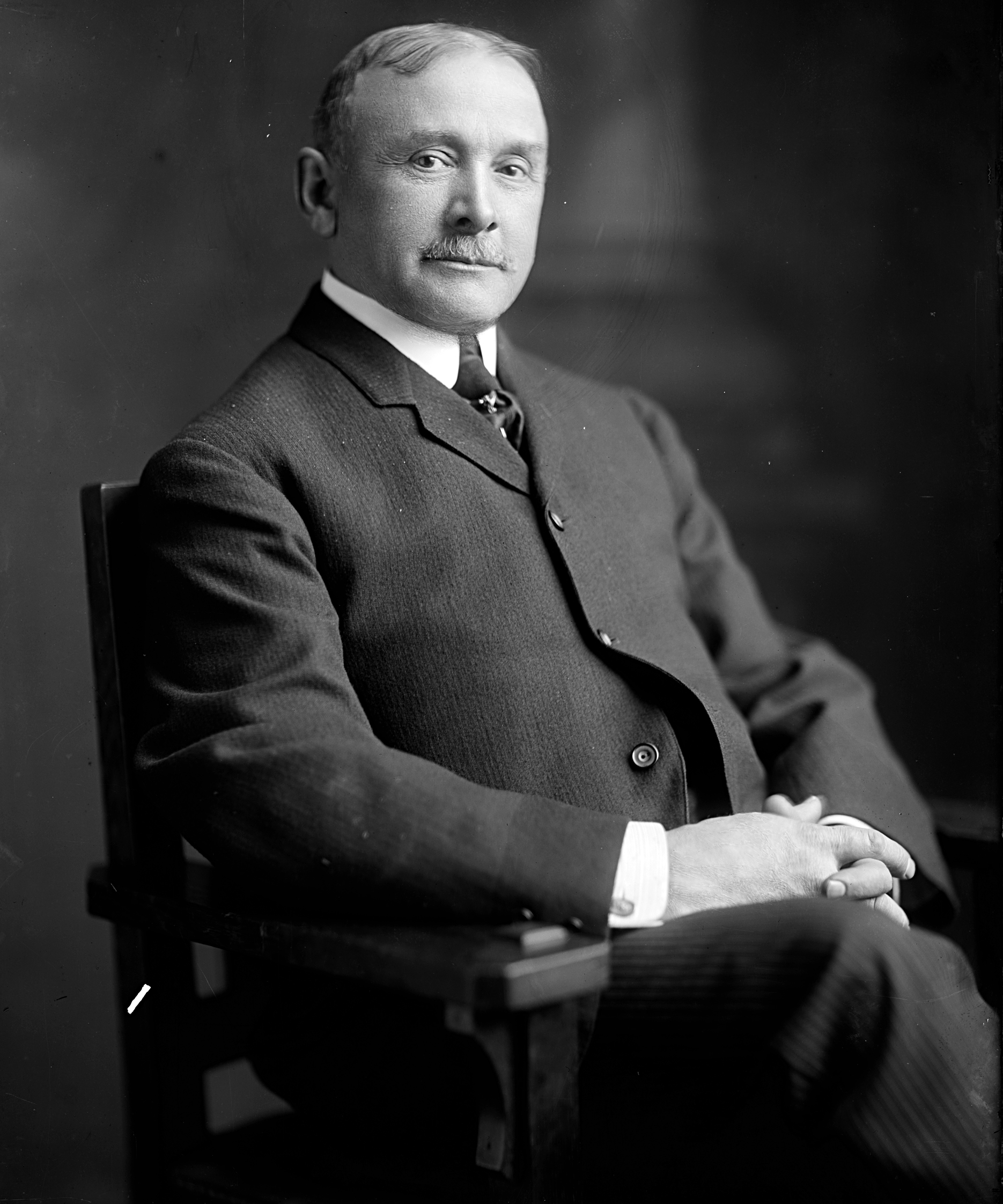
John Kronmiller

John Kronmiller (December 6, 1858 – June 19, 1928) was an American politician and Congressman from Maryland.

Born in Baltimore, Maryland, Kronmiller attended private and public schools and later engaged in the mercantile business and the manufacturing of ivory goods. He served on the city council from 1905 to 1907 before being elected as a Republican to the Sixty-first Congress, serving from March 4, 1909, to March 3, 1911. He was not a candidate for renomination in 1910.

Kronmiller later served as a voluntary member of the board of visitors to the Baltimore City Jail from 1908 to 1912, as director of the Maryland General Hospital in 1913 and 1914, and resumed his former manufacturing pursuits. He was a member of the board of supervisors of election for the city of Baltimore from December 29, 1914, to May 1, 1916. He died in Baltimore, and is interred in Loudon Park Cemetery.

U.S. House of Representatives
Preceded by Harry Benjamin Wolf	Member of the U.S. House of Representatives from Maryland's 3rd congressional district 1909–1911	Succeeded by George Konig
