= Leonard Farbstein =

American politician

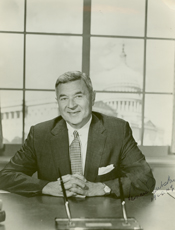

Member of the U.S. House of Representatives from New York's 19th district
- In office January 3, 1957 – January 3, 1971
- Preceded by: Arthur G. Klein
- Succeeded by: Bella Abzug

Member of the New York State Assembly from the 4th district
- In office January 1, 1933 – December 31, 1956
- Preceded by: Samuel Mandelbaum
- Succeeded by: Samuel A. Spiegel

Personal details
- Born: October 12, 1902 New York City, U.S.
- Died: November 9, 1993 (aged 91) New York City, U.S.
- Party: Democratic
- Spouse: Blossom Langer
- Children: 1
- Education: City College of New York; New York University Law School; Hebrew Union Teachers College

Leonard Farbstein (October 12, 1902 – November 9, 1993) was an American lawyer and politician who served seven terms as a U.S. representative from New York from 1957 to 1971.

== Early life and career ==
Farbstein was born on October 12, 1902, in New York City to Louis and Yetta (Schlanger) Farbstein. His father, Louis, was a Jewish immigrant from Russia-Poland and worked as a tailor.

During Farbstein's childhood, he sold newspapers and handkerchiefs after school. In the World War I era, Farbstein as a teenager, served in the United States Coast Guard Reserve.

At war's end, he graduated from High School of Commerce in New York and worked at the Audubon Society during those years. He attended City College of New York and Hebrew Union Teachers College. He received an LL.B. from the New York University School of Law in 1924, and practiced law in New York City.

== Political career ==
=== State legislature ===
Farbstein ran for the New York State Assembly and won his first election in 1932. He was a member of the New York State Assembly from 1933 to 1956.

=== Congress ===
He was elected as a Democrat to the 85th United States Congress and the six succeeding Congresses, holding office from January 3, 1957, to January 3, 1971. In 1966, Farbstein was a senior member of the House Foreign Affairs Committee. He was an open supporter of Lyndon B. Johnson's policy on the Vietnam War. In 1970, he was defeated for re-nomination by Bella Abzug.

== Death ==
Farbstein died on November 9, 1993, aged 91, in New York City, and was interred in Cedar Park Cemetery in Paramus, New Jersey.

== Personal life ==
On September 18, 1947, Farbstein married Blossom Langer, and they had one son whom they named after Farbstein's father.

Farbstein was an avid tennis player and golfer. He also enjoyed swimming as a form of exercise.

== See also ==
- List of Jewish members of the United States Congress

== General Reference ==
- Leonard Farbstein Papers, 1955-1970. M.E. Grenander Department of Special Collections and Archives, University Libraries, University at Albany, State University of New York (hereafter referred to as the Farbstein Papers).

New York State Assembly
Preceded by Samuel Mandelbaum	New York State Assembly; New York County, 4th District; 1933–1956	Succeeded by Samuel A. Spiegel
U.S. House of Representatives
Preceded by Arthur G. Klein	Member of the U.S. House of Representatives from New York's 19th congressional district 1957–1971	Succeeded by Bella Abzug
