= SS John B. Lennon =

World War II Liberty ship of the United States

History

United States
- Name: John B. Lennon
- Namesake: John B. Lennon
- Ordered: as type (EC2-S-C1) hull, MC hull 1509
- Builder: J.A. Jones Construction, Brunswick, Georgia
- Cost: $1,429,841
- Yard number: 125
- Way number: 3
- Laid down: 10 November 1943
- Launched: 22 December 1943
- Sponsored by: Mrs. F.R. Bustin
- Completed: 31 December 1943
- Identification: Call Signal: KVKP
- Fate: Sold into commercial service 1947; Scrapped, October 1968

General characteristics
- Class & type: Type EC2-S-C1 Liberty ship
- Displacement: 14,245 long tons (14,474 t)
- Length: 441 ft 6 in (134.57 m) o/a; 417 ft 9 in (127.33 m) p/p; 427 ft (130 m) w/l
- Beam: 57 ft (17 m)
- Draft: 27 ft 9 in (8.46 m)
- Propulsion: Two oil-fired boilers; Triple-expansion steam engine; 2,500 hp (1,900 kW); Single screw
- Speed: 11 knots (20 km/h; 13 mph)
- Range: 20,000 nmi (37,000 km; 23,000 mi)
- Capacity: 10,856 t (10,685 long tons) deadweight (DWT)
- Crew: 81
- Armament: Stern-mounted 4 in (100 mm) deck gun for use against surfaced submarines, variety of anti-aircraft guns

SS John B. Lennon was an American Liberty ship in World War II. The ship was built by the J.A. Jones Construction shipyard at Brunswick, Georgia; sponsored by Mrs. F.R. Bustin, and launched on 22 December 1943.

The ship was named after John B. Lennon, the treasurer of the American Federation of Labor, later appointed by Woodrow Wilson to the U.S. Department of Labor's board of mediators and Commission of Conciliation, and also served on the U.S. Commission of Industrial Relations.

== Ship history ==
John B. Lennon was operated by the Smith-Johnson Steamship Corporation under a charter with the Maritime Commission and War Shipping Administration. John B. Lennon sailed from the shipyard at Brunswick to New York City in early January 1944, and at the end of the month joined Convoy HX 227 in sailing to the west coast of Scotland. For the next two months was engaged in convoys around the northern coasts of the UK.

On 27 March 1944, she sailed from Liverpool as part of Convoy JW 58 to the Soviet Union, arriving in Kola Inlet on 4 April, and returning with Convoy RA 59, which left the Soviet Union on 28 April, and arrived back at Loch Ewe on 6 May. On 11 May 1944 John B. Lennon left from Liverpool as part of Convoy ON 236 for New York City, and returning with Convoy HX 297 in early July. In late July 1944 she shifted her operations to sail in convoys between ports on the southern coast of England and the Baie de la Seine in northern France. In September she returned to the U.S., sailing with Convoy ON 252 between Belfast and Philadelphia.

In October 1944, John B. Lennon joined Convoy UGS 57, sailing from Hampton Roads to Port Said in Egypt. She then transited the Suez Canal and sailed independently through the Red Sea to Aden, then up the Persian Gulf to spend some time at Khorramshahr, Iran. After several weeks she left the Persian Gulf to sail down the eastern coast of Africa, spending Christmas and the New Year at Tanga in Tanganyika, then sailing via Cape Town and Trinidad back to New York City, arriving there on 21 February 1945. The ship made another voyage to Africa in April 1945, sailing from New York to Cape Town, and calling at several South African ports, before returning via West Africa, and arriving back in the U.S. in June. Finally, between August and December 1945 the ship made two voyages between ports in the United States, and France, Italy and North Africa, presumably as part of Operation Magic Carpet, the effort to return millions of U.S. troops home.

John B. Lennon was sold into commercial service in 1947, and under her new owners the Société Nationale des Chemins de fer Français (SNCF) was renamed Strasbourg. The ship was bought by Cie de Transports Oceaniques in 1948, and Messageries Maritimes in 1955. From 1959, now owned by Mina Corp., she sailed under the Lebanese flag under the name Mantric. The ship was finally scrapped in Onomichi, Japan in 1968.
