= Arthur G. Klein =

American politician

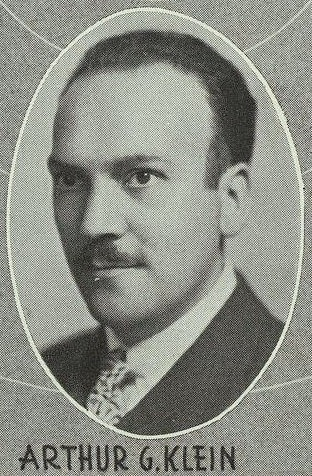

Member of the U.S. House of Representatives from New York
- In office February 20, 1946 – December 31, 1956
- Preceded by: Samuel Dickstein
- Succeeded by: Leonard Farbstein
- Constituency: 19th district
- In office July 29, 1941 – January 3, 1945
- Preceded by: Morris Michael Edelstein
- Succeeded by: Leo F. Rayfiel
- Constituency: 14th district

Personal details
- Born: August 8, 1904 New York City, US
- Died: February 20, 1968 (aged 63) New York City, US
- Resting place: Mount Moriah Cemetery in Fairview, Bergen County, New Jersey
- Party: Democratic
- Education: New York University
- Occupation: Lawyer, jurist

Arthur George Klein (August 8, 1904 – February 20, 1968) was an American lawyer, jurist, and politician who served eight terms as a United States representative from New York during the mid-20th century. He also served as a justice on the New York Supreme Court from 1957 to 1968.

== Biography ==
Arthur G. Klein was born in New York City on August 8, 1904. He attended public schools and Washington Square College of New York University at New York City. He graduated from the law department of New York University in 1926.

=== Early career ===
He was admitted to the bar in 1927, and commenced practice in New York City. He was connected with the U.S. Securities and Exchange Commission in Washington, D.C., and New York City between 1935 and 1941.

=== Congress ===
He was elected as a Democrat to the Seventy-seventh Congress to fill the vacancy caused by the death of M. Michael Edelstein. He was reelected to the Seventy-eighth Congress and served from July 29, 1941, to January 3, 1945. He was not a candidate for renomination in 1944, He was elected to the Seventy-ninth Congress to fill the vacancy caused by the resignation of Samuel Dickstein and then reelected in 1946 to the Eightieth and to the four succeeding United States Congresses and served from February 19, 1946, until his resignation December 31, 1956.

=== New York Supreme Court ===
He was elected to the New York State Supreme Court for the term commencing January 1, 1957, and served until his death.

== Death ==
He died in New York City February 20, 1968, and is interred in Mount Moriah Cemetery in Fairview, Bergen County, New Jersey.

== See also ==
- List of Jewish members of the United States Congress

U.S. House of Representatives
| Preceded by Morris Michael Edelstein | Member of the U.S. House of Representatives from New York's 14th congressional district 1941–1945 | Succeeded by Leo F. Rayfiel |
| Preceded by Samuel Dickstein | Member of the U.S. House of Representatives from New York's 19th congressional district 1946–1956 | Succeeded by Leonard Farbstein |
