= William I. Sirovich =

American politician (1882–1939)

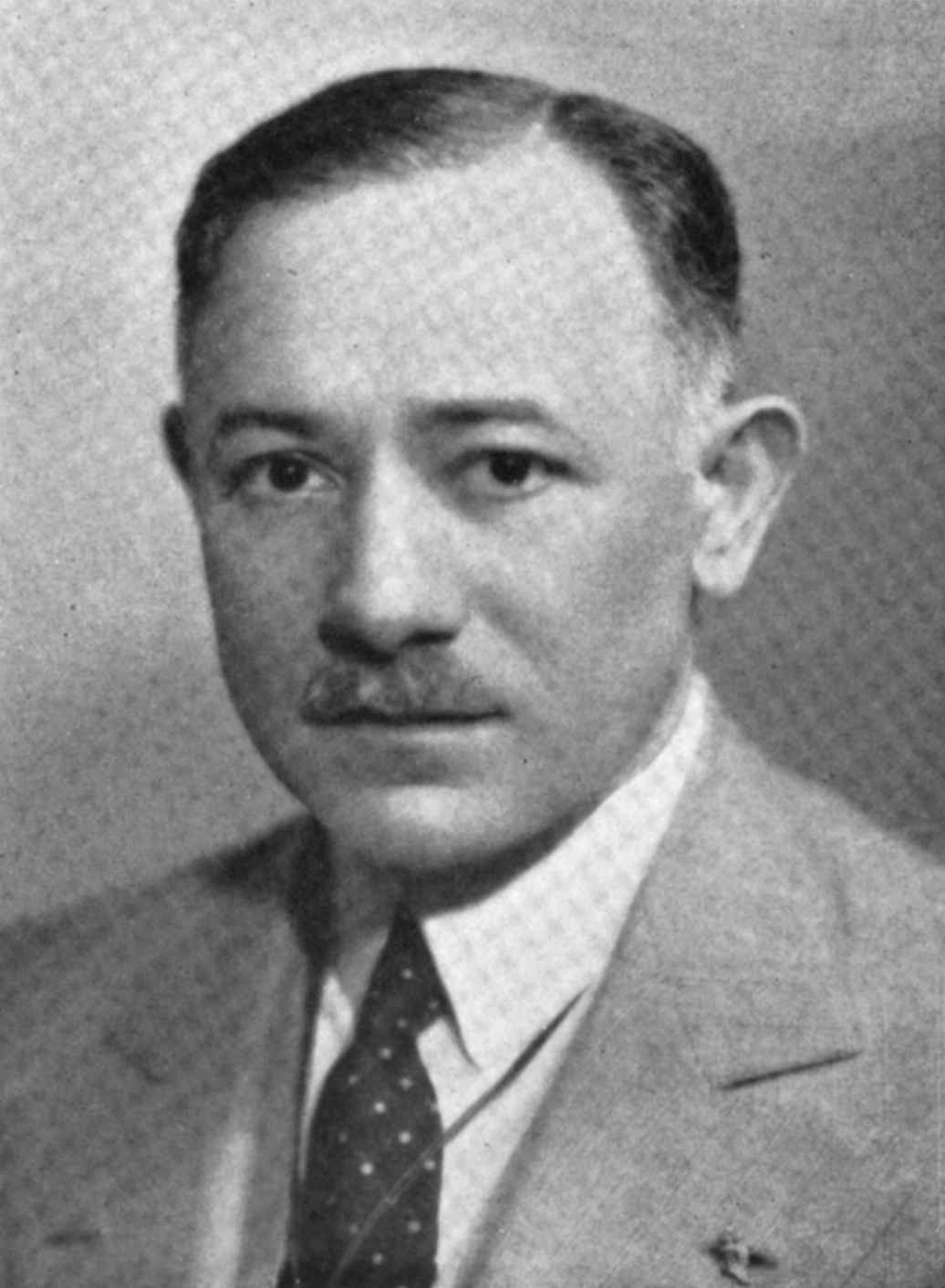

Member of the U.S. House of Representatives from New York's 14th district
- In office March 4, 1927 – December 17, 1939
- Preceded by: Nathan D. Perlman
- Succeeded by: Morris Michael Edelstein

Personal details
- Born: William Irving Sirovich; March 18, 1882 York County, Pennsylvania
- Died: December 17, 1939 (aged 57) New York City
- Resting place: Mount Hebron Cemetery
- Party: Democratic Party
- Education: College of the City of New York; Columbia University College of Physicians and Surgeons
- Occupation: Playwright, physician

William Irving Sirovich (March 18, 1882 – December 17, 1939) was an American medical doctor, playwright and politician from New York. From 1927 to 1939, he served six terms in the U.S. House of Representatives.

== Early life ==
Sirovich was born in 1882 in York County, Pennsylvania to Hungarian-Jewish immigrants Jacob and Rose Sirovich (née Weinstock). The family moved to New York City in 1888. Sirovich attended the public schools there and graduated from the College of the City of New York in 1902 and from the Columbia University College of Physicians and Surgeons in 1906.

=== Early career ===
He commenced the practice of medicine in New York City in 1906 and also engaged as a lecturer, editor, and playwright, several of his plays being produced on Broadway.

== Political career ==
In 1908 and 1910, he ran on the Independence League ticket for New York State Treasurer but was defeated by Republican Thomas B. Dunn (1908) and Democrat John J. Kennedy (1910).

He was a member of the fifth district school board from 1906 to 1926 and was appointed as a member of the commission to inquire into the subject of widows' pensions and of the State pension commission in 1913. He was appointed a member of the State charities convention in 1914 and served as superintendent of Peoples Hospital in New York City from 1910 to 1927. He was appointed commissioner of child welfare in 1919 and served until 1931.

In 1924 he was an unsuccessful candidate for election to the 69th United States Congress. He ran again in 1926 and was elected.

=== Congress ===
Sirovich was elected as a Democrat to the 70th, 71st, 72nd, 73rd, 74th, 75th and 76th United States Congresses, and served from March 4, 1927, until his death in December 1939. During the 72nd through 76th Congresses he was Chairman of the Committee on Patents.

He was President of the Industrial National Bank in New York City from 1929 to 1932 and was a delegate to the Inter-Parliamentary Union Congress held at Bucharest, Romania, in 1931.

== Death ==
Sirovich died in New York City in 1939. He was buried at the Mount Hebron Cemetery in Flushing.

== See also ==
- List of Jewish members of the United States Congress
- List of members of the United States Congress who died in office (1900–1949)

U.S. House of Representatives
Preceded by Nathan David Perlman	Member of the U.S. House of Representatives from New York's 14th congressional district 1927–1939	Succeeded by Morris Michael Edelstein
