= SS Aenos (1944) =

Cargo ship

History
- Name: Rodenbek (1944–45); Empire Contyne (1945–52); Aenos (1955–63); Marlin (1963–65)
- Owner: Knohr & Burchard (1944–45); Ministry of War Transport (1945–46); United States Maritime Commission (1946–48); Smith-Johnson Steamship Corporation (1948–51); Compagnia Maritime Estrella (1951–63); Southern Star Shipping Co Ltd (1963–65)
- Operator: Knohr & Burchard (1944–45); W A Souter & Co Ltd (1945–46); United States Maritime Commission (1946–48); Smith-Johnson Steamship Corporation (1948–51); P D Marchessini & Co (1951–63); Southern Star Shipping Co Ltd (1963–65)
- Port of registry: (Nazi Germany) Hamburg (1944–45); (United Kingdom) London (1945–46); (United States) New York (1945–51); Panama City (1951–63); (Liberia) Monrovia (1963–65)
- Builder: Flensburger Schiffbau-Gesellschaft
- Launched: 1944
- Out of service: 18 October 1965
- Identification: Code Letters GSNY (1945–46); United Kingdom Official Number 180739 (1945–46)
- Fate: Sunk 1965

General characteristics
- Type: Cargo ship
- Tonnage: 1,935 GRT(1913-27); 948 NRT
- Length: 279 ft 8 in (85.24 m)
- Beam: 44 ft 4 in (13.51 m)
- Depth: 15 ft 9 in (4.80 m)
- Installed power: Compound steam engine
- Propulsion: Screw propeller
- Complement: 23 (Marlin)

Location of the sinking of Marlin off North Carolina.

Aenos was a 1,935-gross register ton cargo ship that was built in 1944 as Rodenbek by Flensburger Schiffbau-Gesellschaft, Flensburg, Germany. In 1945, she was seized by the Allies at Flensburg, passed to the Ministry of War Transport (MoWT) and was renamed Empire Contyne. She was allocated to the United States in 1946 and sold into merchant service in 1948. In 1952, she was sold to Panama and renamed Aenos. In 1963, she was sold to Liberia and renamed Marlin, serving until 1965 when she foundered after her cargo shifted off North Carolina.

== Description ==
The ship was built in 1944 by Flensburger Schiff-Gesellschaft, Flensburg.

The ship was 279 feet 8 inches (85.24 m) long, with a beam of 44 feet 4 inches (13.51 m). She had a depth of 15 feet 9 inches (4.80 m) and a draught of 18 feet 4.5 inches (5.60 m).

The ship was propelled by a compound steam engine which had two cylinders of 15 1/2 inches (39 cm) and two cylinders of 35 1/2 inches (90 cm) diameter by 35 1/2 inches (90 cm) stroke. The engine was built by Waggon-und Maschinenbau AG, Görlitz.

== History ==
Rodenbek was built for Knohr & Burchard, Hamburg. She was seized in May 1945 at Flensburg, passed to the MoWT and renamed Empire Contyne. Her port of registry was changed to London. She was placed under the management of W A Souter & Co Ltd. The Code Letters GSNY and United Kingdom Official Number 180739 were allocated.

In 1946, Empire Contyne was allocated to the United States Maritime Commission. She was allocated to the reserve fleet on 23 October 1946. On 28 April 1948, she was sold to the Smith-Johnson Steamship Corporation, New York, for $65,733. Delivery was on 28 May 1948.

On 15 September 1951, Empire Contyne was sold to Compagnia Maritime Estrella, Panama and was renamed Aenos. She was operated under the management of P D Marchessini & Co.

In 1963, Aenos was sold to the Southern Star Shipping Co, Liberia and was renamed Marlin. She served until 18 October 1965 when her cargo shifted on a voyage from Tampa, Florida, United States to Port Williams, Nova Scotia, Canada. Marlin sank 130 nautical miles (240 km) off Cape Fear, North Carolina (34°38′N 75°32′W). Of her 23 crew, 22 were rescued by the British motorship Piako, and the other was rescued by a helicopter of the United States Coast Guard. The Coast Guard had despatched USCGC Chilula to the assistance of Marlin on receiving her distress call, but it lost sight of her after nightfall.
