= Van Vechten Veeder =

American judge

Judge of the United States District Court for the Eastern District of New York
- In office January 26, 1911 – December 31, 1917
- Appointed by: William Howard Taft
- Preceded by: Seat established by 36 Stat. 838
- Succeeded by: Edwin Louis Garvin

Personal details
- Born: Cole Van Vechten Veeder; July 4, 1867 Schenectady, New York
- Died: December 4, 1942 (aged 75) New York City, New York
- Education: Columbia University; University of Virginia; Albany Law School
- Occupation: Attorney

Coles Van Vechten Veeder (July 4, 1867 – December 4, 1942) was a United States district judge of the United States District Court for the Eastern District of New York.

== Early life ==
Born in Schenectady, New York, Veeder was the son of John Wynkoop Veeder (1822–1899) and his second wife, Margaret (nee Van Vechten) Veeder (1844–1916).

Veeder attended Columbia University and the University of Virginia. At the latter, he was a member of the Fraternity of Delta Psi (a.k.a. St. Anthony Hall). He read law in 1890, and received an M.A. from Union College (now Albany Law School).

== Career ==
He was admitted to the Illinois Bar in 1890 and worked in private practice in Chicago until 1900, and subsequently in New York City, New York until 1911.

On January 13, 1911, Veeder was nominated by President William Howard Taft to a new seat on the United States District Court for the Eastern District of New York created by 36 Stat. 838. He was confirmed by the United States Senate on January 26, 1911, and received his commission the same day. Veeder's service was terminated on December 31, 1917, due to his resignation.

Following his resignation from the federal bench, Veeder returned to private practice in New York City with the firm Burlingham, Veeder, Clark and Hupper. He remained in private practice until 1942. He was president of the Maritime Law Association of the United States from 1930 to 1936. He served as counsel to the West Chicago Street Rail Road Company, and as Special Master for the United States Circuit Court of Appeals in 1935. He was also an advisor of torts from the American Law Institute.

In 1940, he was made chairman of the appeals board following a consent decree to outlaw block booking by the Big Five film studios.

== Personal life ==
On June 30, 1909, in Hurley, New York, Veeder married his third cousin Margaret Lounsbery DeWitt (1875–1956). She was the daughter of Abraham Gaasbeek DeWitt and Sarah (nee Lounsberry) DeWitt. They were both descendants of Louis DuBois (Huguenot). Van Vechten and Margaret had two children: John Van Vechten Veeder (1910–1976) and Margaret DeWitt Veeder Hartt (married Frederick Hartt) (1914–1989).

He died on December 4, 1942, in New York City.

Legal offices
Preceded by Seat established by 36 Stat. 838	Judge of the United States District Court for the Eastern District of New York; 1911–1917	Succeeded by Edwin Louis Garvin
