= Morris Michael Edelstein =

American politician

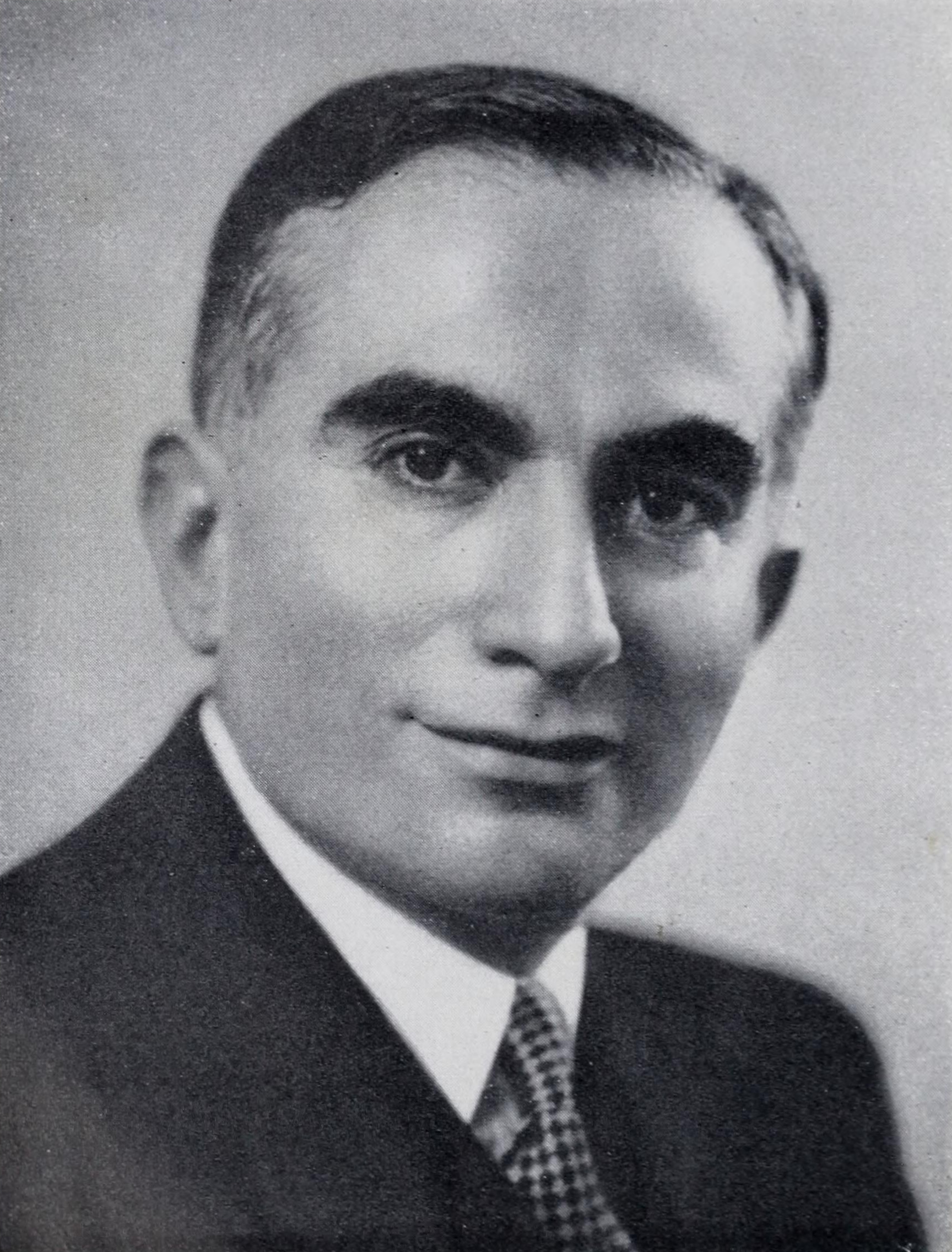
- Portrait by Kaiden c. 1940

Member of the U.S. House of Representatives from New York's 14th district
- In office February 6, 1940 – June 4, 1941
- Preceded by: William I. Sirovich
- Succeeded by: Arthur G. Klein

Personal details
- Born: Morris Michael Edelstein; February 5, 1888 Meseritz (Międzyrzec Podlaski), Congress Poland, Russian Empire
- Died: June 4, 1941 (aged 53) Washington, D.C., U.S.
- Resting place: Mount Zion Cemetery, Maspeth
- Party: Democratic
- Education: St. Lawrence University
- Occupation: Lawyer

Morris Michael Edelstein (February 5, 1888 – June 4, 1941) was a Polish-born U.S. representative and lawyer from the state of New York, serving from 1940 to 1941.

== Biography ==
Edelstein was born in Meseritz (Międzyrzec Podlaski), Congress Poland (then a part of the Russian Empire). At three years of age he immigrated to the United States with his parents, who settled in New York City. He attended public schools and Cooper Union College in New York. He graduated from the Brooklyn Law School of St. Lawrence University, in 1909, and was admitted to the bar in 1910 and practiced law in New York.

Edelstein lived with his mother until the end of his life, having never married. His mother was 85 at the time of his death.

=== Congress ===
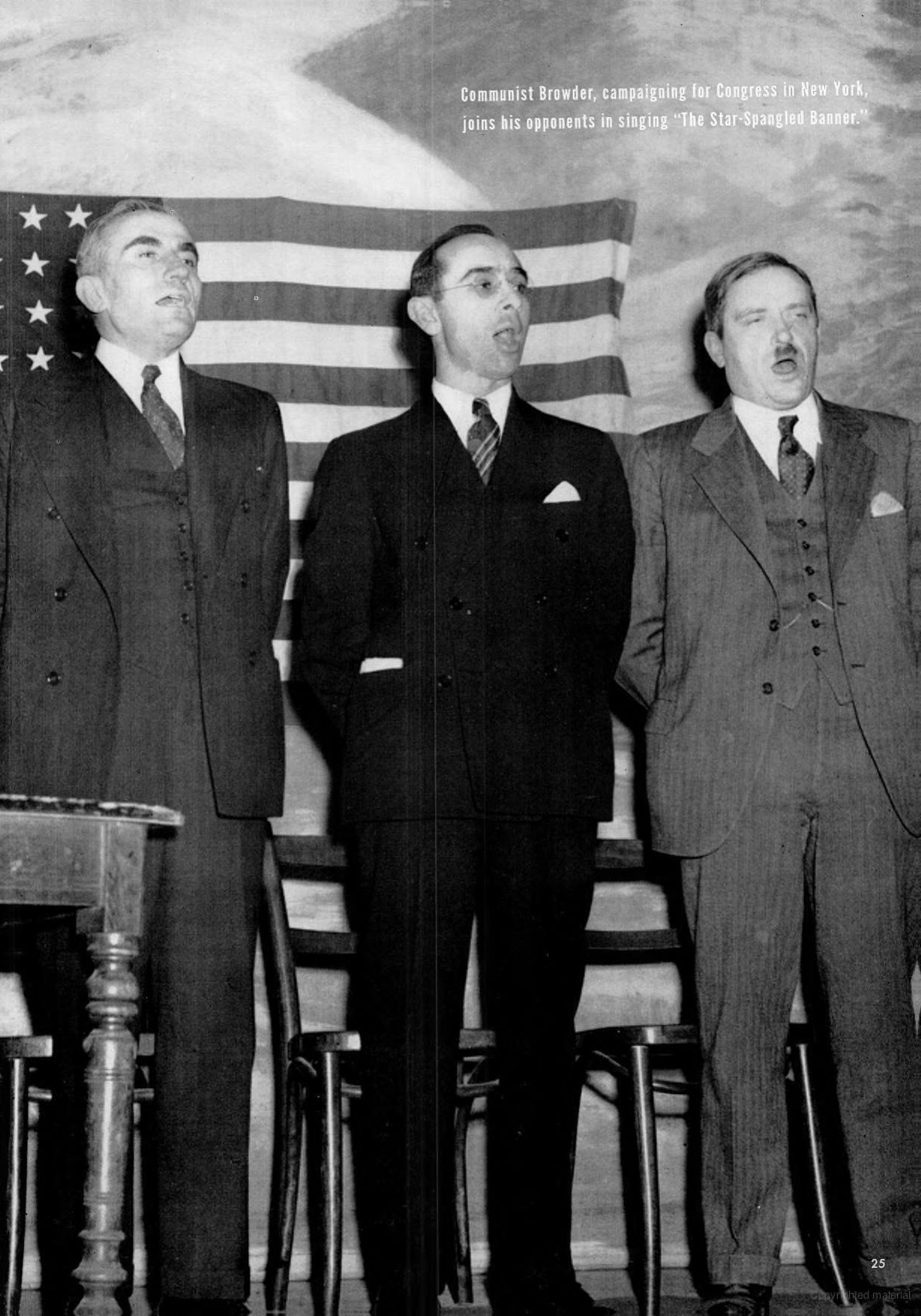
Edelstein (left) sings "The Star-Spangled Banner" alongside his opponents Louis J. Lefkowitz (center) and Earl Browder at a "Democracy in Action" joint campaign meeting, January 30, 1940

Edelstein was elected as a Democrat to the Seventy-sixth Congress to fill the vacancy caused by the death of William I. Sirovich. He was reelected to the Seventy-seventh Congress and served from February 6, 1940, until his death on June 4, 1941, in the cloakroom of the House of Representatives, Washington, D.C., after completing the delivery of a speech on the floor of the House.

== Last speech ==
Edelstein's last speech occurred on June 4, 1941. He took the floor to respond to Mississippi Representative John Elliott Rankin, widely described as an anti-Semite who advocated peace with Nazi Germany. Rankin had just delivered a House floor speech accusing "international Jewish brethren" of trying to drag America into World War II.

In response, Edelstein, who was Jewish, said: "Hitler started out by speaking about 'Jewish brethren.' It is becoming the play and the work of those people who want to demagogue to speak about their 'Jewish brethren' and 'international bankers.' ... I deplore the idea that ... men in this House ... attempt to use the Jews as their scapegoat. I say it is unfair and I say it is un-American. ... All men are created equal, regardless of race, creed or color, and whether a man be Jew or Gentile, he may think what he deems fit."

=== Death and burial ===
Edelstein then walked out of the House. He collapsed and died shortly afterwards in the House cloakroom.

He is buried in Mount Zion Cemetery, Maspeth, New York. 15,000 mourners attended his funeral.

== Legacy ==
The SS M. Michael Edelstein, a World War II liberty ship, was named in his honor.

== See also ==
- List of Jewish members of the United States Congress
- List of members of the United States Congress who died in office (1900–1949)

U.S. House of Representatives
| Preceded by William I. Sirovich | Member of the U.S. House of Representatives from New York's 14th congressional district 1940-02-06 – 1941-06-04 (died) | Succeeded by Arthur G. Klein |
