= Samuel Dickstein =

American congressman and state supreme court justice (1885–1954)

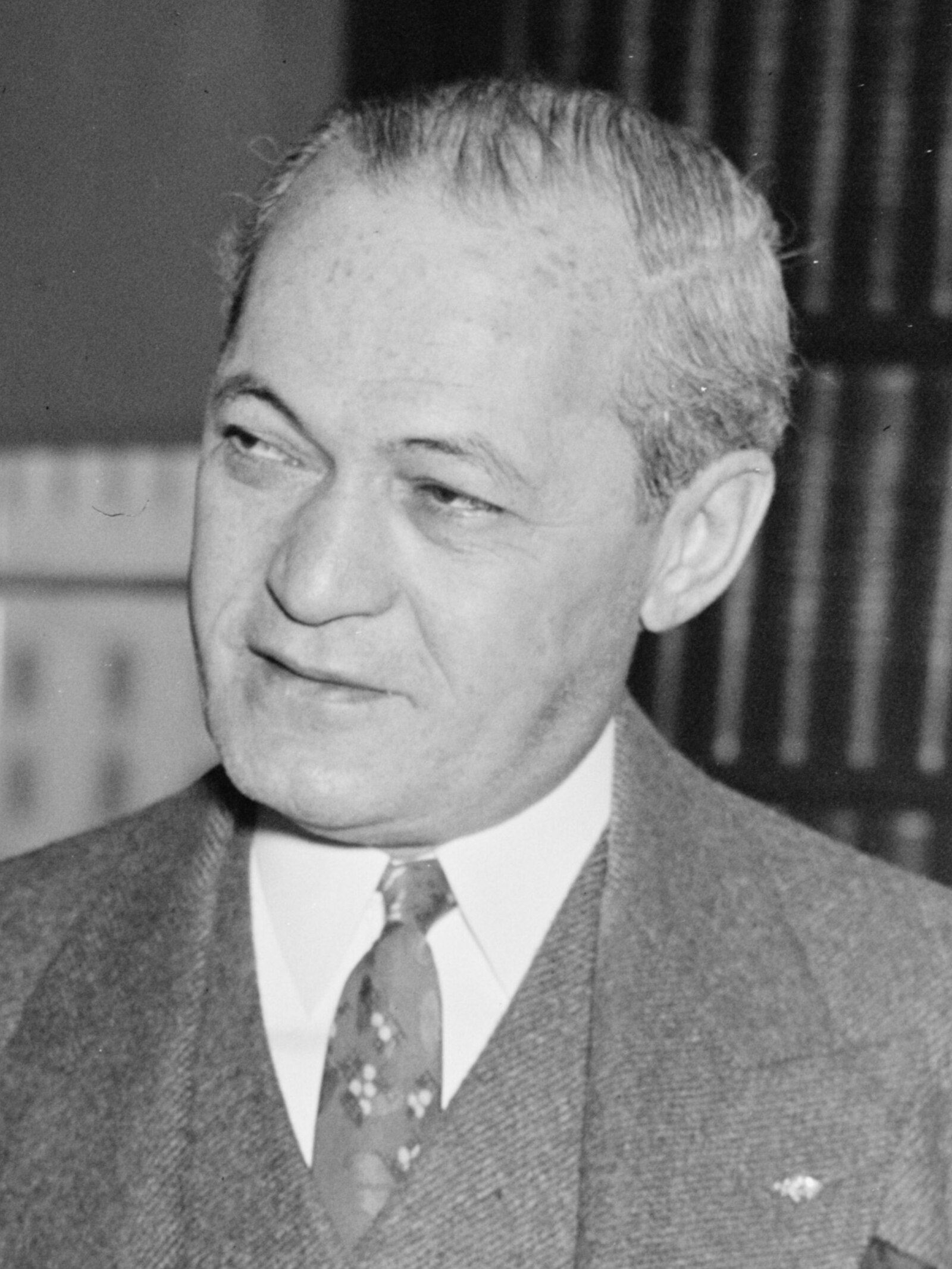
- Dickstein in 1937

Justice of the New York State Supreme Court
- In office January 1, 1946 – April 22, 1954

Chairman of the Committee on Immigration and Naturalization
- In office 1931–1945

Member of the U.S. House of Representatives from New York
- In office March 4, 1923 – December 30, 1945
- Preceded by: Meyer London
- Succeeded by: Arthur G. Klein
- Constituency: 12th district (1923–45); 19th district (1945)

Member of the New York State Assembly from the 4th New York district
- In office January 1, 1919 – December 31, 1922
- Preceded by: William Karlin
- Succeeded by: Samuel Mandelbaum

Personal details
- Born: February 5, 1885 Vilna, Vilna Governorate, Russian Empire
- Died: April 22, 1954 (aged 69) New York City, U.S.
- Resting place: Union Field Cemetery in Queens, NY
- Party: Democratic
- Education: City College of New York; New York Law School

Samuel Dickstein (February 5, 1885 – April 22, 1954) was a Democratic congressional representative from New York (22-year tenure), a New York State Supreme Court Justice, and a Soviet spy. He played a key role in establishing the committee that would become the House Committee on Un-American Activities, which he used to attack fascists, including Nazi sympathizers, and suspected communists. In 1999, authors Allen Weinstein and Alexander Vassiliev learned that Soviet files indicate that Dickstein was a paid agent of the NKVD.

== Background ==
Dickstein was born on February 5, 1885, into a Jewish family of five children near Vilna in the Russian Empire (now known as Vilnius, Lithuania). His parents were Rabbi Israel Dickstein (died 1918) and Slata B. Gordon (died 1931). In 1887, his family immigrated to the United States. They settled on the Lower East Side of New York City. Dickstein attended public and private schools, the City College of New York, and in 1906 graduated from New York Law School.

== Career ==
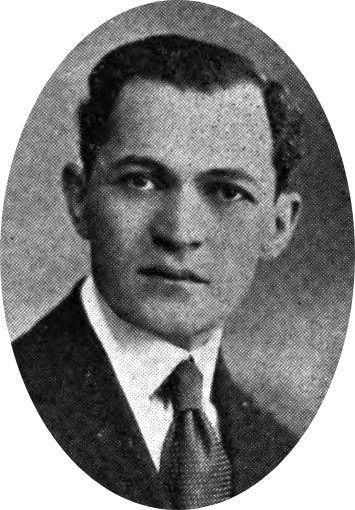
Dickstein's official State Assembly portrait, 1919

In 1908, Dickstein passed the bar and began private practice in New York with the firm of Hyman and Gross.

In 1911, he entered the Tammany Hall Democratic organization in Manhattan under mentor John F. Ahearn. From 1911 to 1914, he served as Deputy State Attorney General. In 1917, he became a New York City Alderman. In 1919, he was elected as an Assemblyman of the New York State Legislature.

=== Congressional career ===
In 1922, Dickstein was elected as a Democrat to the Sixty-eighth Congress, defeating Socialist incumbent Meyer London. He was reelected eleven times. He resigned from Congress on December 30, 1945.

In 1930, Dickstein co-sponsored a bill condemning religious persecution in the Soviet Union.

==== Committee on Naturalization and Immigration ====
By 1931, Dickstein was serving as chairman on the Committee on Immigration and Naturalization (Seventy-second through Seventy-ninth Congresses). During his tenure, he became aware of the substantial number of foreigners legally and illegally entering and residing in the US, and the growing antisemitism along with vast amounts of antisemitic literature being distributed in the country. This led him to investigate independently the activities of Nazi and fascist groups in the U.S.

In 1932, Dickstein joined forces with Martin Dies Jr. to outlaw membership in the Communist Party of the USA.

In 1933, he called for congressional investigation into anarchism, following the failed assassination attempt of U.S. President Franklin Delano Roosevelt by Giuseppe Zangara.

In 1939, Dickstein held hearings on a "Child Refugee Bill", also known as the "Wagner-Rogers Bill", to allow up to 10,000 children under age 14 into the United States during 1939–1940 in addition to normal German quotas. U.S. Secretary of State Cordell Hull opposed the measure, as did the American Legion, United Daughters of the Confederacy, the Society of Mayflower Descendants, and the Daughters of the American Revolution. The hearings made clear that the bill's purpose was to save German Jews from "annihilation... a complete pogrom."

==== McCormack-Dickstein Committee ====
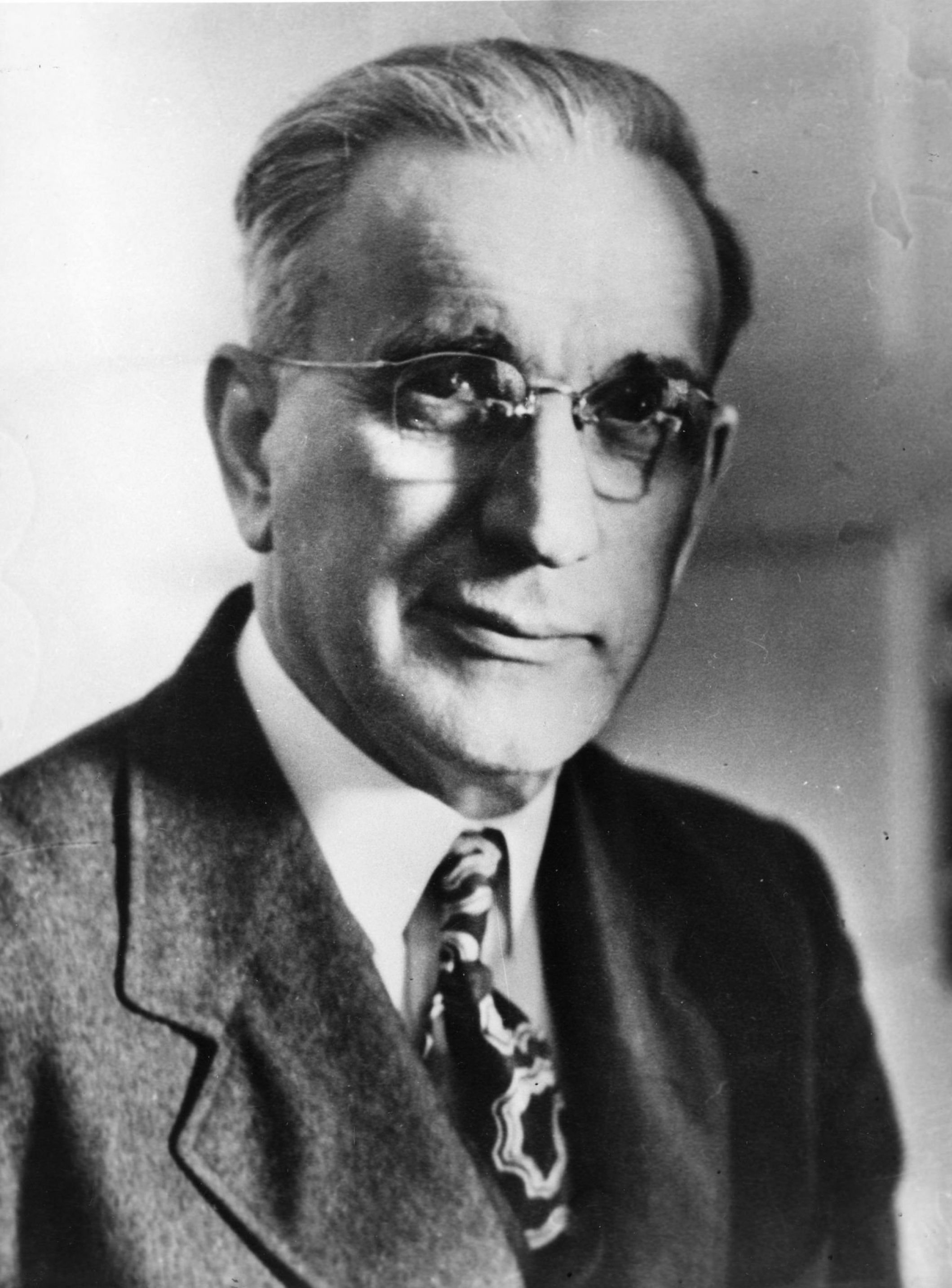
John William McCormack (later 45th Speaker of the United States House of Representatives) was Dickstein's co-chair

On January 3, 1934, Dickstein introduced the "Dickstein Resolution" (H.R. #198), which passed in March 1934, to establish a "Special Committee on Un-American Activities Authorized to Investigate Nazi Propaganda and Certain Other Propaganda Activities" or "McCormack-Dickstein Committee" (later, the "Dies Committee" and later "House Un-American Activities Committee").

Its mandate was to get "information on how foreign subversive propaganda entered the U.S. and the organizations that were spreading it."

From 1934 to 1937, this Special Committee, with John William McCormack (D-MA) as chairman and Dickstein as vice-chairman, held public and private hearings and collected testimony filling 4,300 pages, and it was replaced with a similar committee that focused on pursuing communists. Its records are held by the National Archives and Records Administration as records related to HUAC.

Major General Smedley Butler describes alleged "Business Plot" of 1933

One of the first investigations by the Special Committee was the "Business Plot", an alleged 1933 political conspiracy, which, according to retired Marine Corps Major General Smedley Butler, wealthy businessmen were plotting to create a fascist veterans' organization with Butler as its leader and stage a coup d'état to overthrow President Franklin D. Roosevelt. In 1934, Butler testified before the Special Committee about his claims. No one was prosecuted. Nonetheless, the Special Committee "delet[ed] extensive excerpts relating to Wall Street financiers including Guaranty Trust director Grayson Murphy, J. P. Morgan, the Du Pont interests, Remington Arms, and others allegedly involved in the plot attempt. (Even in 1975, a full transcript of the hearings could not be traced.)"

At the time of the incident, news media at first reported on the plot earnestly, then quickly changed course and dismissed the plot. For instance, The New York Times newsroom gave the plot front-page coverage until an editorial characterized it as a "gigantic hoax". Historians have found no evidence for the existence of the plot beyond Butler's claims.

Throughout the rest of 1934, the Special Committee conducted hearings, bringing before it most of the major figures in the U.S. fascist movement. Dickstein, who proclaimed as his aim the eradication of all traces of Nazism in the U.S., personally questioned each witness. His flair for dramatics and sensationalism, along with his sometimes exaggerated claims, continually captured headlines across the nation and won him much public recognition.

By 1935, the Special Committee had helped publicize that the Friends of New Germany (AKA the "German American Bund") of Fritz Julius Kuhn and the "Silver Shirts" of William Dudley Pelley were supporting Nazi Germany but within existing laws.

In 1937, Dickstein sought for continued House investigation but lost control to Martin Dies Jr.

It has been reported that while Dickstein served on this committee and the subsequent Special investigation Committee, he was paid $1,250 a month by the Soviet NKVD, which hoped to get secret congressional information on anti-communists and pro-fascists. It is unclear whether he actually passed on any information.

Later the same committee was renamed the House Committee on Un-American Activities when it shifted attention to Communist organizations and was made a standing committee in 1945. Following the 1938 German takeover of Austria, Dickstein attempted to introduce legislation that would allow unused refugee quotas to be allocated to those fleeing Hitler.

Democratic leaders in the House distrusted Dickstein. They were unaware of his spying or his bribery, but they did know he brutally browbeat and threatened witnesses, grossly exaggerating evidence, and they removed him from membership on the committee.

In September 1945, not long before stepping down from office, Dickstein called the Dies Committee's investigations into Hollywood "a lot of ballyhoo" about an industry that is almost "100 per cent American" and also asserted that "the alien problem is dying away."

==== NKVD espionage ====
Peter Duffy wrote:

An Austrian working for the Soviets approached him and asked for help in securing American citizenship. Dickstein told the man that the quota for Austrian immigrants was filled but for $3,000 he would see what he could do. Dickstein said he had "settled dozens" in a similarly illegal fashion, according to the NKVD memo on the meeting. Moscow concluded that Dickstein was "heading a criminal gang that was involved in shady businesses, selling passports, illegal smuggling of people, [and] getting citizenship."

In his 2000 book The Haunted Wood, writer Allen Weinstein wrote that documents discovered in the 1990s in Moscow archives showed Dickstein was paid $1,250 a month from 1937 to early 1940 by the NKVD (equivalent to $28,000 in 2025), the Soviet spy agency, which hoped to get secret Congressional information on anti-Communist and pro-fascist forces as well as supporters of Leon Trotsky. According to Weinstein, whether Dickstein provided useful intelligence is not certain; when he left the Committee the Soviets dropped him from the payroll. Dickstein also unsuccessfully attempted to expedite the deportation of Soviet defector Walter Krivitsky, while the Dies Committee kept him in the country. Duffy stated:

Dickstein denounced the Dies Committee at NKVD request ("a Red-baiting excursion") and gave speeches in Congress on Moscow-dictated themes. He handed over "materials on the war budget for 1940, records of conferences of the budget subcommission, reports of the war minister, chief of staff, etc." according to an NKVD report.

The Boston Globe stated: "Dickstein ran a lucrative trade in illegal visas for Soviet operatives before brashly offering to spy for the NKVD, the KGB's precursor, in return for cash." Sam Roberts, in The Brother: The Untold Story of the Rosenberg Case, wrote that "Not even Julius Rosenberg knew that Samuel Dickstein had been on the KGB's payroll." Kurt Stone wrote that Dickstein "was, for many years, a 'devoted and reliable' Soviet agent whom his handlers nicknamed Crook." Joe Persico wrote, "The files document Soviet spying by Representative Samuel Dickstein of New York, so greedy that his handlers gave him the code name Crook."

=== New York Supreme Court justice ===
Following his time in Congress, Dickstein served as a justice of the New York State Supreme Court until his death in 1954.

== Death ==
Dickstein died age 69 on April 22, 1954, in New York City. He was buried at the Union Field Cemetery, Queens, N.Y.

== Legacy ==
A one-block section of Pitt Street, between Grand Street and East Broadway on the Lower East Side of Manhattan, is named Samuel Dickstein Plaza. There has been a push to rename the street, but as of 2025 it has been unsuccessful.

== See also ==
- List of Jewish members of the United States Congress

New York State Assembly
Preceded by William Karlin	New York State Assembly, New York County, 4th District; 1919–1922	Succeeded by Samuel Mandelbaum
U.S. House of Representatives
Preceded by Meyer London	Member of the U.S. House of Representatives from New York's 12th congressional district 1923–1945	Succeeded by John J. Rooney
Preceded by Sol Bloom	Member of the U.S. House of Representatives from New York's 19th congressional district 1945	Succeeded by Arthur G. Klein
