= Endorsements in the 1976 Democratic presidential primaries =

This is a list of endorsements for declared candidates in the Democratic primaries for the 1976 United States presidential election.

== Convention candidates ==
=== Jimmy Carter ===
Jimmy Carter

U.S. House of Representatives

- Jerome Ambro, member of the U.S. House of Representatives from New York's 3rd congressional district (1975–1981)
- Jack Brinkley, member of the U.S. House of Representatives from Georgia's 3rd congressional district (1967–1983)
- Bob Carr, member of the U.S. House of Representatives from Michigan (1975–1981, 1983–1995)
- Norman D'Amours, member of the U.S. House of Representatives from New Hampshire's 1st congressional district (1975–1985)
- Thomas Downey, member of the U.S. House of Representatives from New York's 2nd congressional district (1975–1993)
- Glenn English, member of the U.S. House of Representatives from Oklahoma's 6th congressional district (1975–1994)
- John Flynt, member of the U.S. House of Representatives from Georgia (1954–1979)
- Harold Ford Sr., member of the U.S. House of Representatives from Tennessee (1975–1997)
- Bo Ginn, member of the U.S. House of Representatives from Georgia's 1st congressional district (1973–1983)
- Tom Harkin, member of the U.S. House of Representatives from Iowa's 5th congressional district (1975–1985)
- Bill Hefner, member of the U.S. House of Representatives from North Carolina's 8th congressional district (1975–1999)
- Jack Hightower, member of the U.S. House of Representatives from Texas's 13th congressional district (1975–1985) (previously supported Bentsen)
- Kenneth Lamar Holland, member of the U.S. House of Representatives from South Carolina's 5th congressional district (1975–1983)
- Andrew Jacobs Jr., member of the U.S. House of Representatives from Indiana (1965–1973, 1975–1997)
- John Jenrette, member of the U.S. House of Representatives from South Carolina's 6th congressional district (1975–1980)
- Martha Keys, member of the U.S. House of Representatives from Kansas's 2nd congressional district (1975–1979)
- Phillip M. Landrum, member of the U.S. House of Representatives from Georgia's 9th congressional district (1953–1977)
- Elliott H. Levitas, member of the U.S. House of Representatives from Georgia's 4th congressional district (1975–1985)
- Dawson Mathis, member of the U.S. House of Representatives from Georgia's 2nd congressional district (1971–1981)
- Toby Moffett, member of the U.S. House of Representatives from Connecticut's 6th congressional district (1975–1983)
- Stephen L. Neal, member of the U.S. House of Representatives from North Carolina's 5th congressional district (1975–1995)
- Edward W. Pattison, member of the U.S. House of Representatives from New York's 29th congressional district (1975–1979)
- Ted Risenhoover, member of the U.S. House of Representatives from Oklahoma's 2nd congressional district (1975–1979) (previously supported Bentsen)
- Robert Grier Stephens Jr., member of the U.S. House of Representatives from Georgia's 10th congressional district (1961–1977)
- W. S. Stuckey Jr., member of the U.S. House of Representatives from Georgia's 8th congressional district (1967–1977)
- J. Bob Traxler, member of the U.S. House of Representatives from Michigan's 8th congressional district (1974–1993)
- Richard Vander Veen, member of the U.S. House of Representatives from Michigan's 5th congressional district (1974–1977)
- Andrew Young, member of the U.S. House of Representatives from Georgia's 5th congressional district (1973–1977)

Statewide officials

- Henry Howell, lieutenant governor of Virginia (1971–1974) (Independent)
- Paul Parks, Massachusetts secretary of education (1975–1979)

State legislators

- Vander L. Beatty, member of the New York State Senate (1973–1982)
- Fred Cain, member of the Massachusetts House of Representatives (1965–1977)
- Maurice Hinchey, member of the New York State Senate (1975–1992)
- Stephen McGrail, member of the Massachusetts Senate (1973–1977)
- Anthony M. Scibelli, member of the Massachusetts Senate (1950–1999)

Mayors

- Evan Dobelle, mayor of Pittsfield, Massachusetts (1974–1976) (Republican; previously supported Gerald Ford)
- Nicholas Mavroules, mayor of Peabody, Massachusetts (1967–1979)
- George R. McCarthy, mayor of Everett, Massachusetts (1968–1978)

Former

- Robert T. Capeless, mayor of Pittsfield, Massachusetts (1948–1956)

Local officials

- Archie Spigner, member of the New York City Council (1974–2001)
- Samuel D. Wright, member of the New York City Council (1974–1978)

Party officials

Former

- Jean Rogers Wallin, national committeewoman

Celebrities, political activists, and political commentators

- Gregg Allman, musician and singer
- Richard Brodsky, lawyer
- William L. Brown, president of First National Bank of Boston (1971–1983)
- Zahava Burack, philanthropist, community leader and political activist
- Carole De Saram, feminist and women's rights activist
- Henry Ford II, CEO of the Ford Motor Company (1947–1979)
- Dorothy Pitman Hughes, feminist, child-welfare advocate, activist, public speaker, and author
- Milton Katz, professor and jurist
- Arthur Levitt, broker
- The Marshall Tucker Band, rock band
- Gillian Sorensen
- William Jacobus vanden Heuvel, attorney, businessman, author
- Leonard Woodcock, president of the United Auto Workers (1970–1977)
- Mortimer Zuckerman, CEO of Boston Properties (1970–2016)

=== Mo Udall ===
Mo Udall

Executive branch officials

Former

- Stewart Udall, United States secretary of the interior (1961–1969)

State Department officials

Former

- William McCormick Blair Jr., ambassador to the Philippines (1964–1967) (previously supported Shriver)
- John Kenneth Galbraith, ambassador to India (1961–1963)

Justice Department officials

Former

- Ramsey Clark, attorney general of the United States (1966–1969)
- Archibald Cox, solicitor general of the United States (1961–1965)

U.S. Senate

- James Abourezk, member of the U.S. Senate from South Dakota (1973–1979) (previously supported Harris)
- Philip Hart, member of the U.S. Senate from Michigan (1959–1976)
- George McGovern, member of the U.S. Senate from South Dakota (1963–1981) (previously supported Shriver)
- Frank Moss, member of the U.S. Senate from Utah (1959–1977)

Former

- Joseph S. Clark Jr., member of the U.S. Senate from Pennsylvania (1957–1969)

U.S. House of Representatives

- Bella Abzug, member of the U.S. House of Representatives from New York (1971–1977)
- Les Aspin, member of the U.S. House of Representatives from Wisconsin's 1st congressional district (1971–1993)
- Herman Badillo, member of the U.S. House of Representatives from New York (1971–1977)
- Alvin Baldus, member of the U.S. House of Representatives from Wisconsin's 3rd congressional district (1975–1981)
- Jonathan B. Bingham, member of the U.S. House of Representatives from New York (1965–1983)
- Edward Boland, member of the U.S. House of Representatives from Massachusetts's 2nd congressional district (1953–1989)
- George Brown Jr., member of the U.S. House of Representatives from California (1963–1971, 1973–1999)
- Shirley Chisholm, member of the U.S. House of Representatives from New York's 12th congressional district (1969–1983)
- John Conyers, member of the U.S. House of Representatives from Michigan (1965–2017) (previously supported Harris)
- Robert Drinan, member of the U.S. House of Representatives from Massachusetts (1971–1981)
- Don Edwards, member of the U.S. House of Representatives from California (1963–1995)
- Frank Evans, member of the U.S. House of Representatives from Colorado's 3rd congressional district (1965–1979)
- James J. Howard, member of the U.S. House of Representatives from New Jersey's 3rd congressional district (1965–1988)
- Robert Kastenmeier, member of the U.S. House of Representatives from Wisconsin's 2nd congressional district (1959–1991)
- Robert Leggett, member of the U.S. House of Representatives from California's 4th congressional district (1963–1979)
- Matthew F. McHugh, member of the U.S. House of Representatives from New York (1975–1993)
- K. Gunn McKay, member of the U.S. House of Representatives from Utah's 1st congressional district (1971–1981)
- Parren Mitchell, member of the U.S. House of Representatives from Maryland's 7th congressional district (1971–1987)
- Dave Obey, member of the U.S. House of Representatives from Wisconsin's 7th congressional district (1969–2011)
- Tip O'Neill, House majority leader from Massachusetts (1953–1987)
- Richard Ottinger, member of the U.S. House of Representatives from New York (1965–1971, 1975–1985)
- Charles Rangel, member of the U.S. House of Representatives from New York (1971–2017)
- Thomas M. Rees, member of the U.S. House of Representatives from California (1965–1977)
- Henry S. Reuss, member of the U.S. House of Representatives from Wisconsin's 5th congressional district (1955–1983)
- Louis Stokes, member of the U.S. House of Representatives from Ohio (1969–1999)
- Gerry Studds, member of the U.S. House of Representatives from Massachusetts (1973–1997)
- Frank Thompson, member of the U.S. House of Representatives from New Jersey's 4th congressional district (1955–1980)
- Paul Tsongas, member of the U.S. House of Representatives from Massachusetts's 5th congressional district (1975–1979)
- Lionel Van Deerlin, member of the U.S. House of Representatives from California (1963–1981)
- Charlie Wilson, member of the U.S. House of Representatives from Texas's 2nd congressional district (1973–1996) (previously supported Bentsen)

Former

- Wayne Owens, member of the U.S. House of Representatives from Utah's 2nd congressional district (1973–1975, 1987–1993)
- Jerome Waldie, member of the U.S. House of Representatives from California's 14th congressional district (1966–1975)

Governors

Former

- Frank B. Morrison, governor of Nebraska (1961–1967)

Statewide officials

- Carol S. Greenwald, banking commissioner of Massachusetts (1975–1979)
- Zell S. Rice, secretary of transportation for Wisconsin (1975–1977)
- Frederick P. Salvucci, secretary of transportation for Massachusetts (1975–1979, 1983–1991)
- Charles P. Smith, state treasurer of Wisconsin (1971–1991)
- James Stone, insurance commissioner of Massachusetts (1975–1979)

Former

- Richard J. Sullivan, commissioner of the Department of Environmental Protection for New Jersey (1970–1974)

State legislators

- Norman C. Anderson, speaker of the Wisconsin State Assembly (1957–1959, 1961–1973, 1973–1977)
- Chester G. Atkins, member of the Massachusetts Senate (1972–1984)
- Frank J. Barbaro, member of the New York State Assembly (1973–1996)
- Lloyd Barbee, member of the Wisconsin State Assembly (1965–1977)
- Julian Bond, member of the Georgia Senate (1975–1987)
- Jack E. Bronston, member of the New York State Senate (1975–1982) (previously supported Bayh)
- Perry Bullard, member of the Michigan House of Representatives (1973–1992) (previously supported Harris)
- Karen Burstein, member of the New York State Senate (1973–1978)
- Sean Francis Cahillane, member of the Massachusetts House of Representatives
- Mary Chambers, member of the New Hampshire House of Representatives (1972–1992)
- Mark Clodfelter, member of the Michigan House of Representatives (1975–1980)
- John J. Conte, member of the Massachusetts Senate
- George Cushingberry Jr., member of the Michigan House of Representatives (1975–1982, 2005–2010)
- Dudley Dudley, member of the New Hampshire House of Representatives (1972–1976)
- Daisy Elliott, member of the Michigan House of Representatives (1963–1978, 1981–1982)
- Barney Frank, member of the Massachusetts House of Representatives (1973–1981)
- Pete Grannis, member of the New York State Assembly (1975–2007)
- Charles J. Harrison Jr., member of the Michigan House of Representatives (1973–1995)
- Gary K. Hart, member of the California State Assembly (1974–1982)
- David Hollister, member of the Michigan House of Representatives (1975–1993)
- Raymond W. Hood, member of the Michigan House of Representatives (1965–1982)
- K. Leroy Irvis, member of the Pennsylvania House of Representatives (1969–1988)
- H. Lynn Jondahl, member of the Michigan House of Representatives (1973–1993, 1993–1994)
- Raymond A. Jordan, member of the Massachusetts House of Representatives (1975–1994)
- Richard E. Landry, member of the Massachusetts House of Representatives
- H. Craig Lewis, member of the Pennsylvania State Senate (1975–1994)
- Garreth J. Lynch, member of the Massachusetts House of Representatives
- Allan R. McKinnon, member of the Massachusetts Senate (1971–1985)
- Midge Miller, member of the Wisconsin State Assembly (1971–1985)
- William C. Mullin, member of the Massachusetts House of Representatives
- Mary Lou Munts, member of the Wisconsin State Assembly (1973–1985)
- James B. Murray, member of the Virginia House of Delegates (1974–1983)
- William P. Nagle Jr., member of the Massachusetts House of Representatives (1975–2002)
- Manfred Ohrenstein, minority leader of the New York State Senate (1961–1994)
- John Olver, member of the Massachusetts Senate (1973–1981)
- Major Owens, member of the New York State Senate (1975–1982)
- Jeffrey D. Padden, member of the Michigan House of Representatives (1975–1985)
- Vincent J. Piro, member of the Massachusetts House of Representatives
- Joseph Rhodes Jr., member of the Pennsylvania House of Representatives (1973–1980)
- Francis E. Rogers, member of the Massachusetts House of Representatives
- Alan Sisitsky, member of the Massachusetts Senate (1973–1983)
- Irving J. Stolberg, member of the Connecticut House of Representatives (1971–1993)
- Ronald Stott, member of the New York State Assembly (1975–1976)
- Karen Swanson, member of the Massachusetts House of Representatives
- Peter J. Tropman, member of the Wisconsin State Assembly (1973–1979)
- B. Joseph Tully, member of the Massachusetts Senate (1971–1979)
- Kenneth L. Webster, member of the Maryland House of Delegates (1970–1978)
- Bruce E. Wetherbee, member of the Massachusetts House of Representatives
- Thomas P. White, member of the Massachusetts House of Representatives

Former

- Peter A. A. Berle, member of the New York State Assembly (1969–1972)
- David Dinkins, minority leader of the New York State Assembly (1966)

Mayors

- Howard W. Redfern, Jr., mayor of Chicopee, Massachusetts (1976–1978)
- John Rhodes, mayor of Westfield, Massachusetts
- Albert Wheeler, mayor of Ann Arbor, Michigan

Local officials

- Robert Abrams, borough president of The Bronx (1971–1978) (previously supported Bayh)
- Charles W. Bowser, deputy mayor of Philadelphia, Pennsylvania (1967–1969) (Independent/Philadelphia Party)
- Miriam Friedlander, member of the New York City Council (1974–1991)
- Carol Greitzer, member of the New York City Council (1969–1991)
- Luis Olmedo, member of the New York City Council (1973–1984)
- Frederick E. Samuel, member of the New York City Council (1973–1985)
- Jerry Springer, member of the Cincinnati City Council (1971–1974, 1975–1980)
- Robert F. Wagner Jr., member of the New York City Council (1975–1979)

Former

- Eugene Nickerson, county executive of Nassau County, New York (1962–1970)

Party officials

- Jo Baer, national committeewoman

Former

- David Roche, chairman of the New Hampshire Democratic Party (?–1974)

Organizations

- Americans for Democratic Action

Celebrities, political activists, and political commentators

- Thomas Boylston Adams, president of the Massachusetts Historical Society (1957–1975)
- Lynn Adelman, lawyer
- Bill Bradley, professional basketball player
- Jimmy Breslin, journalist and author
- Joseph F. Bruno, trial lawyer
- Hale Champion, government and academic administrator
- Harry Chapin, singer-songwriter, philanthropist, and hunger activist (previously supported Harris)
- Eileen C. Dugan
- Victor Gotbaum, president of AFSCME District Council 37 (1965–1987)
- Helen M. Marshall
- Velmanette Montgomery, teacher and adjunct professor
- Paul Newman, actor, film director, race-car driver, philanthropist, and entrepreneur (previously supported Shriver)
- Louis Nizer, lawyer
- Jean O'Leary, lesbian and gay rights activist
- Regina Ovesey, advertising executive
- Cliff Robertson, actor
- Linda Ronstadt, singer

Newspapers and publications

- Arkansas Gazette, newspaper in Little Rock, Arkansas
- The Capital Times, weekly newspaper in Madison, Wisconsin

=== Jerry Brown ===
Jerry Brown

State legislators

- Julian Dixon, member of the California Assembly (1973–1978)
- Bill Greene, member of the California Senate (1975–1992)
- Teresa Patterson Hughes, member of the California Assembly (1975–1992)
- John T. Miller, member of the California Assembly (1967–1978)
- Leon D. Ralph, member of the California Assembly (1967–1976)
- Curtis R. Tucker, member of the California Assembly (1974–1988)

=== George Wallace ===
George Wallace

Executive branch officials

Defense Department officials

Former

U.S. Senate

- James Allen, member of the U.S. Senate from Alabama (1969–1978)
- John Sparkman, member of the U.S. Senate from Alabama (1946–1979)

U.S. House of Representatives

- Tom Bevill, member of the U.S. House of Representatives from Alabama (1967–1997)
- Walter Flowers, member of the U.S. House of Representatives from Alabama (1969–1979)
- Bill Nichols, member of the U.S. House of Representatives from Alabama (1967–1988)

Former

- John Rarick, member of the U.S. House of Representatives from Louisiana's 6th congressional district (1967–1975)

Governors

Former

- Ross Barnett, governor of Mississippi (1960–1964)
- Paul B. Johnson Jr., governor of Mississippi (1964–1968)
- Lester Maddox, governor of Georgia (1967–1971)
- John Bell Williams, governor of Mississippi (1968–1972)

Statewide officials

- Melba Till Allen, treasurer of Alabama (1975–1978)
- Agnes Baggett, secretary of state of Alabama (1951–1955, 1963–1967, 1975–1979)
- Jere Beasley, lieutenant governor of Alabama (1971–1979)
- Bettye Frink, state auditor of Alabama (1963–1967, 1975–1983)
- Heber Austin Ladner, secretary of state of Mississippi (1948–1980)
- McMillan Lane, commissioner of agriculture for Alabama (1974–1983)

State legislators

- Jack Biddle, member of the Alabama House of Representatives (1974–1994)
- Don Childers, member of the Florida Senate (1975–1990)
- Robert C. Gafford, member of the Alabama House of Representatives
- Art Givens, member of the Arkansas House of Representatives
- Frank Henslee, member of the Arkansas House of Representatives
- Woody Jenkins, member of the Louisiana House of Representatives (1972–2000)
- Hartwell Lutz, member of the Alabama House of Representatives
- Richard S. Manly, member of the Alabama House of Representatives
- Joe McCorquodale, speaker of the Alabama House of Representatives (1959–1983)
- Larry Morris, member of the Alabama House of Representatives
- Kerry Rich, member of the Alabama House of Representatives
- Edward Robertson, member of the Alabama House of Representatives
- J. Thomas Sandusky, member of the Alabama House of Representatives

Former

- David Van Horn, member of the Arkansas House of Representatives

Mayors

Former

Local officials

- Dapper O'Neil, member of the Boston City Council (1971–1999)
- Elvira "Pixie" Palladino, member of the Boston School Committee

Celebrities, political activists, and political commentators

- Jim Ed Brown, singer
- Bear Bryant, head coach of the Alabama Crimson Tide (1958–1982)
- Stoney Cooper, singer and musician
- Wilma Lee Cooper, vocalist, guitarist, and banjoist
- Little Jimmy Dickens, singer, songwriter
- Bill France Sr., president of NASCAR (1948–1971)
- Billy Grammer, singer and guitarist
- Jack Greene, musician
- David Houston, singer
- Jan Howard, singer, songwriter and author
- Ferlin Husky, singer
- Grandpa Jones, singer and banjoist
- Ralph Jordan, head coach of the Auburn Tigers (1951–1975)
- Lonzo and Oscar, country music duo
- Joe Maphis, guitarist
- Rose Lee Maphis, singer and musician
- Stu Phillips, singer
- Jeannie C. Riley, singer
- Jeannie Seely, singer and songwriter
- Jean Shepard, singer
- Cal Smith, musician
- Hank Snow, singer and guitarist
- Red Sovine, singer and songwriter
- Ernest Tubb, singer and songwriter
- Justin Tubb, singer and songwriter
- Richard Viguerie, direct mail marketeer
- Roy Wiggins, steel guitarist
- Doyle Wilburn, entertainer
- Marion Worth, singer
- Faron Young, singer and songwriter

=== Ellen McCormack ===
Ellen McCormack

State legislators

- Florian Chmielewski, member of the Minnesota Senate (1971–1997)
- Tad Jude, member of the Minnesota House of Representatives (1973–1983)

Celebrities, political activists, and political commentators

- Mildred Fay Jefferson, president of the National Right to Life Committee (1975–1978)

== Withdrawn candidates ==
=== Henry Jackson ===
Henry Jackson (to May 1, 1976)

Executive branch officials

State Department officials

Former

- Daniel Patrick Moynihan, United States senator from New York (1977–2002), U.S. ambassador to India, ambassador to the United Nations (1975–1976)

U.S. House of Representatives

- Herman Badillo, member of the U.S. House of Representatives from New York (1971–1977)
- Mario Biaggi, member of the U.S. House of Representatives from New York (1969–1988)
- John M. Murphy, member of the U.S. House of Representatives from New York's 5th congressional district (1963–1981)
- James H. Scheuer, member of the U.S. House of Representatives from New York (state) (1965–1973, 1975–1993)

Former

- Herbert Tenzer, member of the U.S. House of Representatives from New York's 5th congressional district (1965–1969)

State legislators

- Charles J. Buffone, member of the Massachusetts House of Representatives
- Elizabeth Connelly, member of the New York State Assembly (1974–2000)
- John C. Dearie, member of the New York State Assembly (1973–1992)
- Angelo Del Toro, member of the New York State Assembly (1975–1994)
- James A. Kelly Jr., member of the Massachusetts Senate (1965–1979)
- Michael LoPresti Jr., member of the Massachusetts Senate (1973–1993)
- Vincent F. Nicolosi, member of the New York State Assembly (1973–1980)
- Seymour Posner, member of the New York State Assembly (1965–1978)

Mayors

- Jean A. Levesque, mayor of Salem, Massachusetts (1972–1982) (Republican)
- John A. Markey, mayor of New Bedford, Massachusetts (1972–1982)
- William C. Sullivan, mayor of Springfield, Massachusetts (1973–1978)

Local officials

- James Michael Connolly, member of the Boston City Council
- Norman Goodman, county clerk of New York County (1969–2014)
- Frederick C. Langone, member of the Boston City Council (1961, 1964–1971, 1973–1983)
- Morton Povman, member of the New York City Council (1971–2001)
- Aileen B. Ryan, member of the New York City Council (1966–1983)
- Jeremy S. Weinstein, deputy assistant attorney general of New York (1975–1976)

Celebrities, political activists, and political commentators

- Shelley Appleton, trade union executive and attorney
- Carol Berman
- Hazel Nell Dukes, civil rights activist
- Nathan Glazer, sociologist
- Harold M. Jacobs, Jewish and civic leader
- Judith Jacobs, teacher
- Seymour Martin Lipset, sociologist and political scientist
- Lillian Roberts, activist
- Harry Schwartz, editorial writer for The New York Times (1951–1979)

=== Fred Harris ===
Fred Harris (to April 2, 1976)

U.S. Senate

- James Abourezk, member of the U.S. Senate from South Dakota (1973–1979)

U.S. House of Representatives

- John Conyers, member of the U.S. House of Representatives from Michigan (1965–2017)
- Michael J. Harrington, member of the U.S. House of Representatives from Massachusetts's 6th congressional district (1969–1979)
- Howard Wolpe, member of the U.S. House of Representatives from Michigan (1973–1993)

Statewide officials

- Doug La Follette, secretary of state of Wisconsin (1975–1979, 1983–2023)

State legislators

- Jack Backman, member of the Massachusetts Senate (1971–1987)
- Timothy A. Bassett, member of the Massachusetts Senate (1973–1985)
- Nate Holden, member of the California Senate (1974–1978)
- Gary D. Jones, member of the Massachusetts Senate
- Francis C. Lapointe, member of the Massachusetts House of Representatives (1969–1979)
- Katie Morrison, member of the Wisconsin Senate
- George Rogers, member of the Massachusetts Senate (1975–1978)

Celebrities, political activists, and political commentators

- Daniel Aaron, writer and academic
- Harry Chapin, singer-songwriter, philanthropist, and hunger activist
- Daniel Ellsberg, political activist, economist, and military analyst
- Arlo Guthrie, singer-songwriter
- George Hardy, president of the Service Employees International Union (1971–1980)
- Florynce Kennedy, lawyer, radical feminist, and civil rights activist
- Martin Kilson, political scientist
- Norman Lear, screenwriter and producer
- Orleans, pop rock band
- Tom Paxton, singer-songwriter
- Elliott Sclar, professor of urban planning
- Pete Seeger, singer, songwriter, musician, and social activist
- George Wald, scientist and activist
- Wade Watts, gospel preacher and civil rights activist

=== Sargent Shriver ===
Sargent Shriver (to March 16, 1976)

Executive branch officials

Former

- Walter Heller, chair of the Council of Economic Advisers (1961–1964)

Defense Department officials

Former

- Cyrus Vance, deputy secretary of defense (1964–1967)

State Department officials

Former

- William McCormick Blair Jr., ambassador to the Philippines (1964–1967)
- John A. Gronouski, ambassador to Poland (1965–1968)

Justice Department officials

Former

- Donald E. O'Brien, U.S. attorney for the Northern District of Iowa (1961–1967)

U.S. Senate

- George McGovern, member of the U.S. Senate from South Dakota (1963–1981)

U.S. House of Representatives

- Paul Simon, member of the U.S. House of Representatives from Illinois (1975–1985)

Former

- William H. Meyer, member of the U.S. House of Representatives from Vermont's at-large congressional district (1959–1961)

Governors

Former

- William A. Egan, governor of Alaska (1959–1966, 1970–1974)
- Philip H. Hoff, governor of Vermont (1963–1969) (previously supported Terry Sanford)

Statewide officials

Former

- Edward F. Harrington, head of the Massachusetts Alcoholic Beverage Control Commission (1974–1975)
- Thomas L. Hayes, lieutenant governor of Vermont (1969–1971)

State legislators

- Thomas J. Claveau, member of the New Hampshire Senate
- Thomas J. Hanahan, member of the Illinois House of Representatives (1965–1983)
- Edgar May, member of the Vermont House of Representatives (1973–1983)
- Michael E. McLaughlin, member of the Massachusetts House of Representatives
- John E. Murphy Jr., member of the Massachusetts House of Representatives (1971–1985)
- William Ed Osborne, member of the Vermont House of Representatives (1973–1977)

Former

- Joseph Bernal, member of the Texas Senate (1966–1972)
- Michael J. Daley, member of the Massachusetts House of Representatives
- Frances Farenthold, member of the Texas House of Representatives (1969–1973)

Mayors

Former

- Ivan Allen Jr., mayor of Atlanta, Georgia (1962–1970) (Jointly with Jimmy Carter)

Local officials

- Edward M. Burke, member of the Chicago City Council (1969–2023)
- Lawrence DiCara, member of the Boston City Council (1972–1981)
- George Dunne, president of the Cook County Board of Commissioners (1969–1990)
- Wilson Frost, member of the Chicago City Council (1967–1987)
- Jack Kelly Jr., member of the Philadelphia City Council (1967–1979)
- Edward Vrdolyak, member of the Chicago City Council (1971–1987)

Celebrities, political activists, and political commentators

- Vernon Alden, chairman of the Boston Company (1969–1978)
- Arthur Ashe, professional tennis player
- Lauren Bacall, actress
- Ruth Batson, director of METCO (1966–1969)
- James MacGregor Burns, historian and political scientist
- James Caan, actor
- Elizabeth Candon, president of Trinity College of Vermont (1966–1976)
- Topper Carew, director
- Carol Channing, actress, comedian, and singer
- Edward S. Gleason, headmaster of Noble and Greenough School (1971–1987)
- Richard Alton Graham, director of the National Teacher Corps (1966–1971)
- Rosey Grier, former football player, bodyguard, actor, and singer
- Clarie Collins Harvey, businesswoman, religious leader and civil rights activist
- Aaron Henry, civil rights leader
- Ethel Kennedy, human rights advocate
- Joan Bennett Kennedy, socialite, musician, author, and model
- Rose Kennedy, philanthropist and socialite
- Patricia Kennedy Lawford, socialite
- Cloris Leachman, actress
- Peter MacDonald, chairman of the Navajo Nation (1971–1983)
- William Manchester, author, biographer, and historian
- Roger Masters, sociologist
- Jabir Herbert Muhammad, businessman and co-founder of Top Rank, Inc.
- Paul Newman, actor and director
- Glenn Olds, president of Kent State University (1971–1977)
- Jacqueline Kennedy Onassis, First Lady of the United States (1961–1963)
- Mildred Otenasek, professor at Notre Dame of Maryland University
- Ara Parseghian, head football coach for Notre Dame (1964–1974)
- Paul A. Porter, lawyer
- Samuel DeWitt Proctor, minister, educator, and humanitarian
- William Ferguson Reid, physician, politician and civil rights activist
- Art Rooney, chairman and owner of the Pittsburgh Steelers (1933–1988)
- Mark Slade, actor, artist, and author
- Chesterfield Smith, president of the American Bar Association (1973–1974)
- Laurence Tribe, legal scholar
- Kurt Vonnegut, author
- Jill Wine-Banks, lawyer
- Joanne Woodward, actress
- Adam Yarmolinsky, academic, educator and author

=== Milton Shapp ===
Milton Shapp (to March 12, 1976)

Executive branch officials

Defense Department officials

Former

- Leonard Matlovich, technical sergeant in the United States Air Force (1963–1975)

U.S. Senate

- Joe Biden, member of the U.S. Senate from Delaware (1973–2009)

Statewide officials

- Dick Doran, chief of staff to the governor of Pennsylvania

Former

- C. Delores Tucker, secretary of the Commonwealth of Pennsylvania (1971–1977)

State legislators

- Alan S. Becker, member of the Florida House of Representatives (1972–1978)

Mayors

- Frank Rizzo, mayor of Philadelphia, Pennsylvania (1972–1980)

Celebrities, political activists, and political commentators

- Mark Segal, publisher of the Philadelphia Gay News (1976–present)

=== Birch Bayh ===
Birch Bayh (to March 4, 1976)

U.S. Senate

- Vance Hartke, member of the U.S. Senate from Indiana (1959–1977)

U.S. House of Representatives

- John Brademas, member of the U.S. House of Representatives from Indiana's 3rd congressional district (1959–1981)
- J. Edward Roush, member of the U.S. House of Representatives from Indiana (1959–1969, 1971–1977)

Governors

Former

- Matthew E. Welsh, governor of Indiana (1961–1965)

Statewide officials

- Thomas P. O'Neill III, lieutenant governor of Massachusetts (1975–1983)

State legislators

- Royal L. Bolling Jr., member of the New York State Senate (1959–1978)
- Jack E. Bronston, member of the New York State Senate (1975–1982)]
- Thomas F. Brownell, member of the Massachusetts House of Representatives
- Doris Bunte, member of the Massachusetts House of Representatives (1973–1984)
- Kevin M. Burke, member of the Massachusetts House of Representatives (1975–1979)
- James G. Collins, member of the Massachusetts House of Representatives (1973–1986)
- Kathryn Cushman, member of the New Hampshire House of Representatives (1973–1977)
- Paul N. Estee, member of the New Hampshire House of Representatives (1975–1977)
- Philip F. Filosa, member of the Massachusetts House of Representatives
- Bernard D. Flynn, member of the Massachusetts House of Representatives (1975–1979)
- Robert Garcia, member of the New York State Assembly (1967–1978)]
- Mary H. Goode, member of the Massachusetts House of Representatives (1975–1978)
- Richard N. Gottfried, member of the New York State Assembly (1971–2022)]
- Vincent J. Graber Sr., member of the New York State Assembly (1975–1994)]
- William B. Hoyt, member of the New York State Assembly (1975–1992)
- Philip W. Johnston, member of the Massachusetts House of Representatives (1975–1984)
- Rolland E. Kidder, member of the New York State Assembly (1975–1982)]
- Peter C. McCarthy, member of the Massachusetts House of Representatives (1969–1979)
- Richard J. McGrath, member of the Massachusetts House of Representatives
- Paul E. Means, member of the Massachusetts House of Representatives
- Elaine Noble, member of the Massachusetts House of Representatives (1975–1979)
- Henry J. O'Donnell, member of the Massachusetts House of Representatives
- Chuck Schumer, member of the New York State Assembly (1975–1980)]
- James W. Segel, member of the Massachusetts House of Representatives
- Emanuel Serra, member of the Massachusetts House of Representatives
- Mark Alan Siegel, member of the New York State Assembly (1975–1990)]
- Chris Spirou, member of the New Hampshire House of Representatives (1970–1984)
- David J. Swartz, member of the Massachusetts House of Representatives
- Max Volterra, member of the Massachusetts House of Representatives

Former

- Bob Moretti, speaker of the California State Assembly (1965–1974)

Mayors

- Leo J. Farley, mayor of Lowell, Massachusetts (1976–1977)
- Glen Knecht, mayor of Crawfordsville, Indiana (1976–1987)
- Frank McCloskey, mayor of Bloomington, Indiana (1972–1983)

Local officials

- Robert Abrams, borough president of The Bronx (1970–1978)
- Robert Ellis Cahill, sheriff of Essex County, Massachusetts (1975–1978)
- Arthur Katzman, member of the New York City Council (1962–1991)]

Party officials

Former

- John J. Burns, chairman of the Democratic Party of New York (1965–1971)
- Jean Haugland, vice chair of the Democratic Party of Iowa (1976?)
- Eugene "Pete" O'Grady, chairman of the Democratic Party of Ohio (1966–1970)

Celebrities, political activists, and political commentators

- Dick the Bruiser, wrestler, promoter, and football player
- James Moss Friedman, attorney (Campaign Manager)
- Wilma Scott Heide, president of the National Organization for Women (1971–1974)
- George Kistiakowsky, physical chemist
- Myrtle Ann McIntyre, wife of U.S. Senator Thomas J. McIntyre
- Tom Miller, lawyer
- Arthur Solomon, head of the Harvard–MIT Joint Center for Urban Studies (1975–1980)
- David B. Truman, president of Mount Holyoke College (1971–1977)
- James Vorenberg, professor of law

=== Lloyd Bentsen ===
Lloyd Bentsen (to February 10, 1976)

Executive branch officials

Former

- Jack Valenti, White House chief of staff (1965–1966)

State Department officials

Former

- Thomas K. Finletter, U.S. ambassador to NATO (1961–1965)

U.S. Senate

- Russell B. Long, member of the U.S. Senate from Louisiana (1948–1987)

U.S. House of Representatives

- Omar Burleson, member of the U.S. House of Representatives from Texas's 17th congressional district (1947–1978)
- Robert R. Casey, member of the U.S. House of Representatives from Texas's 22nd congressional district (1959–1976)
- John Herman Dent, member of the U.S. House of Representatives from Pennsylvania's 21st congressional district (1958–1979)
- Thomas N. Downing, member of the U.S. House of Representatives from Virginia's 1st congressional district (1959–1977)
- Jack Hightower, member of the U.S. House of Representatives from Texas's 13th congressional district (1975–1985)
- George H. Mahon, member of the U.S. House of Representatives from Texas's 19th congressional district (1935–1979)
- Dale Milford, member of the U.S. House of Representatives from Texas's 24th congressional district (1973–1979)
- William R. Poage, member of the U.S. House of Representatives from Texas's 11th congressional district (1937–1978)
- Ted Risenhoover, member of the U.S. House of Representatives from Oklahoma's 2nd congressional district (1975–1979)
- Tom Steed, member of the U.S. House of Representatives from Oklahoma's 4th congressional district (1949–1981)
- Charlie Wilson, member of the U.S. House of Representatives from Texas's 2nd congressional district (1973–1996)
- Jim Wright, member of the U.S. House of Representatives from Texas's 12th congressional district (1955–1989)

Governors

- Dolph Briscoe, governor of Texas (1973–1979)
- Edwin Edwards, governor of Louisiana (1972–1980, 1984–1988, 1992–1996)

Statewide officials

- Bob Armstrong, land commissioner of Texas (1971–1983)
- John Hill, attorney general of Texas (1973–1979)
- William P. Hobby Jr., lieutenant governor of Texas (1973–1991)
- Andrew P. Miller, attorney general of Virginia (1970–1977)
- John Coyle White, agriculture commissioner of Texas (1951–1977)

State legislators

- Herman Adams, member of the Texas House of Representatives
- George E. Allen Jr., member of the Virginia House of Delegates (1954–1982)
- Peter K. Babalas, member of the Virginia Senate (1968–1987)
- Bill W. Clayton, speaker of the Texas House of Representatives (1975–1983)
- ~~Lewis P. Fickett Jr., member of the Virginia House of Delegates (1974–1982)~~ (switched to Humphrey Draft Effort)
- Daniel J. Foley, member of the Massachusetts Senate
- Joe Hanna, member of the Texas House of Representatives (1971–1985)
- Kevin B. Harrington, member of the Massachusetts Senate (1959–1978)
- William B. Hopkins, member of the Virginia Senate (1960–1980)
- Paul Leonard, member of the Ohio House of Representatives
- Elmer Martin, member of the Texas House of Representatives
- C. J. McLin, member of the Ohio House of Representatives (1967–1988)
- Lynn Nabers, member of the Texas House of Representatives (1973–1983)
- Edward E. Willey, member of the Virginia Senate (1952–1986)

Former

- Glen M. Hatch, member of the Utah Senate

Local officials

- Elinor Guggenheimer, commissioner of the New York City Department of Consumer Affairs (1973–1978)

Party officials

- Joseph T. Fitzpatrick, chair of the Democratic Party of Virginia (1972–1979)
- John Klas, chair of the Democratic Party of Utah

Celebrities, political activists, and political commentators

- Richard S. Reynolds, Jr., head of Reynolds Metals

=== Terry Sanford ===
Terry Sanford (to January 25, 1976)

U.S. Senate

- ~~Robert B. Morgan, member of the U.S. Senate from North Carolina (1975–1981)~~ (Endorsement Partially Rescinded)

U.S. House of Representatives

- L. Richardson Preyer, member of the U.S. House of Representatives from North Carolina's 6th congressional district (1969–1981)

Governors

Former

- Ned Breathitt, governor of Kentucky (1963–1967)
- Happy Chandler, governor of Kentucky (1935–1939, 1955–1959)
- Bert Combs, governor of Kentucky (1959–1963)
- Philip H. Hoff, governor of Vermont (1963–1969)
- Robert W. Scott, governor of North Carolina (1969–1973)
- Hulett C. Smith, governor of West Virginia (1965–1969)

Statewide officials

Former

- Harry Lee Waterfield, lieutenant governor of Kentucky (1963–1967)

State legislators

- Willis Whichard, member of the North Carolina Senate (1975–1980)

Party officials

Former

- Jean Westwood, chair of the Democratic National Committee (1972)

Celebrities, political activists, and political commentators

- Smith Bagley, businessman
- Anne Cannon Forsyth, Cannon Mills and R. J. Reynolds heiress
- Phil Hanes, businessman and conservationist
- William H. May, chairman of the Kentucky Racing Commission (1960–1978)
- Colin B. Stokes, president of R. J. Reynolds Industries

== Others ==
=== Hubert Humphrey ===
Hubert Humphrey Draft Effort (to April 29, 1976)

U.S. House of Representatives

- Robert Bergland, member of the U.S. House of Representatives from Minnesota's 7th congressional district (1971–1977)
- Jim Oberstar, member of the U.S. House of Representatives from Minnesota's 8th congressional district (1975–2011)
- Paul Simon, member of the U.S. House of Representatives from Illinois (1975–1985)

Governors

- Wendell R. Anderson, governor of Minnesota (1971–1976)
- Richard F. Kneip, governor of South Dakota (1971–1978)

Statewide officials

Former

- Edward J. McCormack Jr., attorney general of Massachusetts (1958–1963)

State legislators

- Peter J. Coelho, member of the Rhode Island House of Representatives
- J. Howard Duffy, member of the Rhode Island House of Representatives
- John J. Skiffington Jr., speaker of the Rhode Island House of Representatives
- Sam Solon, member of the Minnesota Senate (1973–2001)

Mayors

- Robert Beaudin, mayor of Duluth, Minnesota (1975–1979)

Local officials

- Abraham G. Gerges, member of the New York City Council (1975–1990)
- Percy Sutton, borough president of Manhattan (1966–1977)

=== Uncommitted ===
Uncommitted

U.S. House of Representatives

- Otis G. Pike, member of the U.S. House of Representatives from New York's 1st congressional district (1961–1979)

Former

- Allard K. Lowenstein, member of the U.S. House of Representatives from New York's 5th congressional district (1969–1971)

State legislators

- Estella B. Diggs, member of the New York State Assembly (1973–1980)
- Alan Hochberg, member of the New York State Assembly (1970–1977)
- George J. Hochbrueckner, member of the New York State Assembly (1975–1984)
- Israel Ruiz Jr., member of the New York State Senate (1975–1982)
- José E. Serrano, member of the New York State Assembly (1975–1990)

Former

- Stanley Harwood, member of the New York State Assembly (1966, 1967–1972)
- Jules G. Sabbatino, member of the New York State Assembly (1959–1970)
- Chester J. Straub, member of the New York State Senate (1973–1975)
- Victor C. Waryas, member of the New York State Senate (1965–1958)

Local officials

- Louis Gigante, member of the New York City Council (1973–1977)
- Mary Pinkett, member of the New York City Council (1974–2001)
- Edward L. Sadowsky, member of the New York City Council (1962–1985)
- Ramón S. Vélez, member of the New York City Council (1973–1977)

Celebrities, political activists, and political commentators

- Dorothy Brunson, broadcaster
- Joshua Fishman, linguist
- Don Mankiewicz, screenwriter and novelist
- Irma Vidal Santaella, lawyer
- Joseph Stein, playwright
- R. Peter Straus, president of WMCA (1959–1986)
