= 1976 Democratic Party presidential primaries =

Selection of the Democratic Party nominee

- January 27 to June 8, 1976

3,010 delegates to the Democratic National Convention 1,506 (majority) votes needed to win

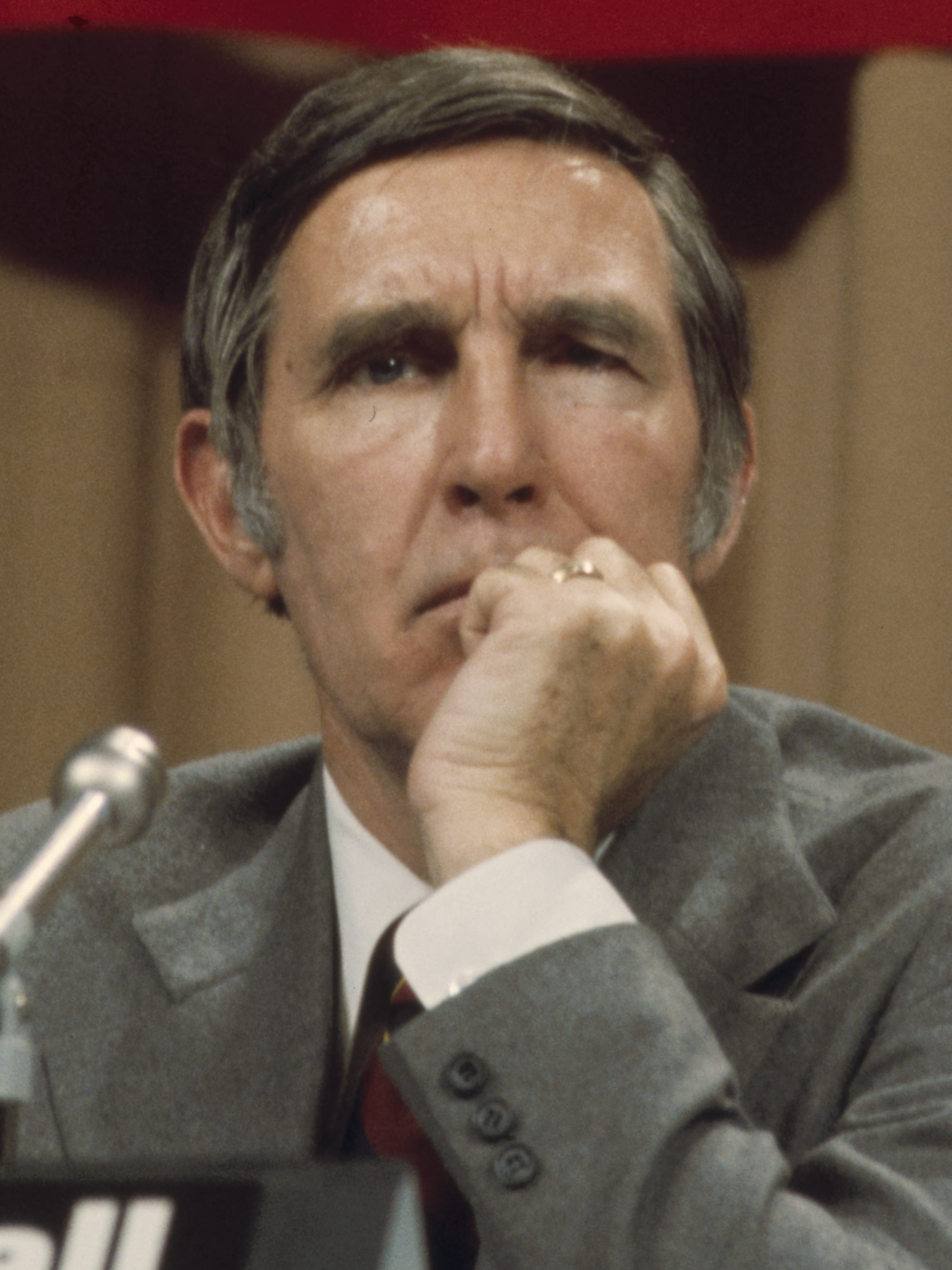

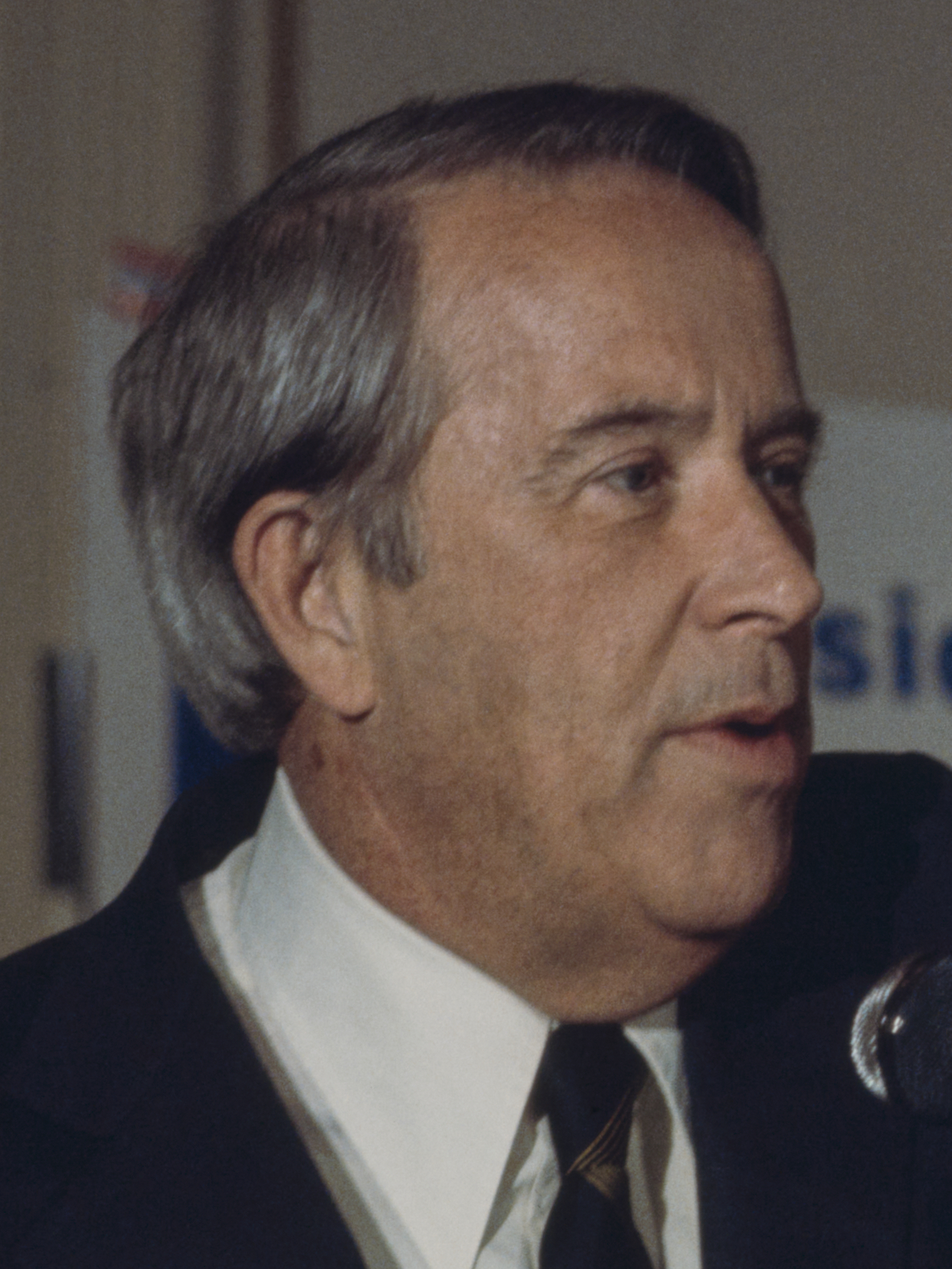

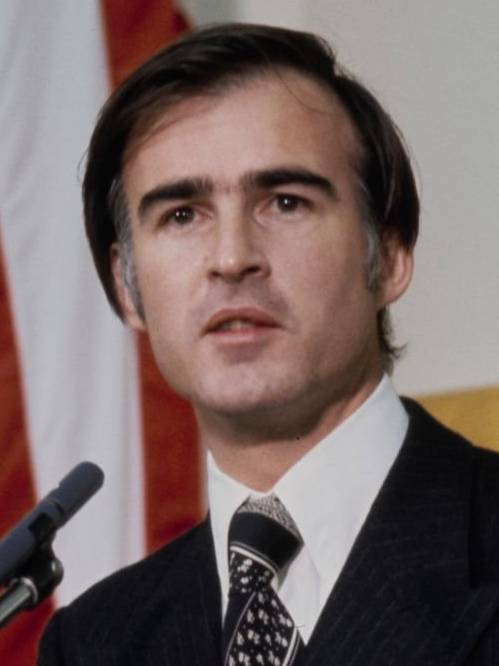

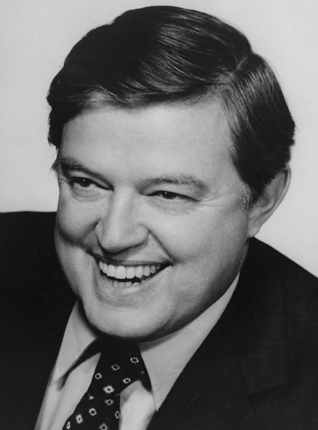
Candidate	Jimmy Carter	Mo Udall	Henry M. Jackson
Home state	Georgia	Arizona	Washington
Delegate count	1,130	328	242
Contests won	24	1	4
Popular vote	7,020,624	1,667,362	1,153,766
Percentage	39.67%	9.42%	6.52%
Candidate	Jerry Brown	George Wallace	Frank Church
Home state	California	Alabama	Idaho
Delegate count	226	146	78
Contests won	3	2	4
Popular vote	2,449,374	2,268,895	831,209
Percentage	13.84%	12.82%	4.70%
- Carter Udall Brown Jackson Wallace; Church Humphrey Byrd Uncommitted
Previous Democratic nominee
George McGovern
Democratic nominee
Jimmy Carter

From January 27 to June 8, 1976, voters of the Democratic Party chose its nominee for president in the 1976 United States presidential election. Former Georgia governor Jimmy Carter was selected as the nominee through a series of primary elections and caucuses culminating in the 1976 Democratic National Convention held from July 12 to July 15, 1976, in New York City.

The primaries took place after the Watergate scandal and the subsequent Democratic landslide in the 1974 midterm elections. Going into the presidential election, the Democratic Party stood a strong chance of recapturing control of the White House. Hoping to avoid a repeat of 1972, Democrats nominated centrist Georgia governor Jimmy Carter to reclaim the Solid South and win back northern working-class voters. He ultimately defeated President Gerald Ford by a narrow margin, which was the only Democratic presidential win from 1968 until 1988.

== Background ==
=== 1972 election ===
In 1972, Senator George McGovern seized the Democratic nomination through an early campaign and superior organization, aided by his inside knowledge of the reforms under a commission he chaired. McGovern, widely seen as an extremely liberal candidate, lost the general election in a historic landslide to incumbent Richard Nixon, carrying only the state of Massachusetts.

=== Watergate scandal ===
During the 1972 campaign, several men were arrested for a break-in at the Watergate complex, home of the Democratic National Committee headquarters. As the investigation continued, it became clear that the break-in was one of several tactics utilized by the Nixon campaign against their political opponents. The scandal and the subsequent attempt to cover it up eventually forced President Nixon to resign from office under political pressure and the threat of impeachment. Nixon was succeeded by Gerald Ford, whom he had appointed to the Vice Presidency after Spiro Agnew himself resigned under investigation for bribery.

As a result of the Watergate scandal and other scandals, the American withdrawal from Vietnam, and an ongoing economic recession, the Democratic Party won a major landslide in the 1974 midterm elections. The post-Watergate political environment also led to a tightening of campaign finance regulations, the creation of the Church Committee to investigate abuses by federal intelligence agencies, and a general opposition to Washington and establishment politicians.

=== Pre-campaign maneuvering ===
Much of the speculation for the 1976 nomination surrounded Senator Hubert Humphrey of Minnesota, formerly Vice President of the United States and the party's nominee in 1968. Humphrey had won the largest number of votes in the 1972 primaries but lost in a bitter fight with McGovern. Though Humphrey ultimately declined to seek the nomination again, many early votes went to uncommitted delegates who supporters hoped would commit to Humphrey by the time of the convention.

Senator Henry “Scoop” Jackson raised his national profile by speaking out on Soviet Union–United States relations and Middle East policy regularly, and was considered a front-runner for the nomination when he announced the start of his campaign in February 1975. Jackson received substantial financial support from Jewish-Americans who admired his pro-Israel views, but Jackson's support of the Vietnam War resulted in hostility from the left wing of the Democratic Party.

Jackson chose to run on social issues, emphasizing law and order and his opposition to busing. Jackson was also hoping for support from labor, but the possibility that Hubert Humphrey might enter the race caused unions to offer only lukewarm support.

The 1976 campaign was the first presidential campaign in which the primary system was dominant. However, most of the Democratic candidates failed to realize the significance of the increased number of primaries, or the importance of creating momentum by winning the early contests. Jimmy Carter, who was virtually unknown at the national level, leveraged his obscurity to run as an "outsider" to Washington. Carter's plan was to run in all of the primaries and caucuses, beginning with the Iowa caucuses, and build up momentum by winning "somewhere" each time primary elections were held.

== Schedule and results ==
Tablemaker's Note: (Note: This should not be taken as a finalized list of results. While a significant amount of research was done, there were a number of Delegates who were not bound by the instruction, or "Pledged" to a candidate, and to simplify the data these delegates were considered "Uncommitted". Many states also held primaries for the delegate positions, and these on occasion were where slates or candidates pledge to a certain candidate might be elected; however, as these elections allowed for a single person to vote for multiple candidates, as many as the number of positions being filled, it is difficult to determine how many people actually voted in these primaries. For this reason, while the results of some are in the table, they are not included in the popular vote summaries at the bottom of the table.)

Date	Total pledged delegates	Contest and total popular vote	Delegates won and popular vote																	
Date	Total pledged delegates	Contest and total popular vote	Jimmy Carter	Jerry Brown	Mo Udall	George Wallace	Birch Bayh	Lloyd Bentsen	Frank Church	Fred Harris	Hubert Humphrey	Henry Jackson	Milton Shapp	Sargent Shriver	Ellen McCormack	Terry Sanford	Robert Byrd	Walter Fauntroy	Walter Washington	Other(s) Unpledged
January 19	0 (of 47)	Iowa; Caucuses; 39,039	10,764 (27.57%)	-	2,340 (5.99%)	-	5,148 (13.19%)	-	-	3,861 (9.89%)	-	429 (1.10%)	-	1,287 (3.30%)	-	-	-	-	-	15,210 (Note: Includes 14,508 votes for Unpledged slate of Delegates at (37.16%).) (38.96%)
January 24	0 (of 24)	Mississippi; Caucuses (Note: Only half the vote was accounted for in those sources found.); 1,482.13 CDs	203.96 CDs (13.76%)	-	-	661.36 CDs (44.62%)	-	23.16 CDs (1.56%)	-	15.61 CDs (1.05%)	-	-	-	177.87 CDs (12.00%)	-	-	-	-	-	400.17 CDs (27.00%)
February 7	0 (of 37)	Oklahoma; Caucuses (Note: Though nearly complete, still a partial result.); 7,186 CDs	1,323 CDs (18.41%)	-	-	756 CDs (10.52%)	-	900 CDs (12.52%)	-	1,187 CDs (16.51%)	-	-	-	-	-	-	-	-	-	2,882 CDs (Note: Almost all are Uncommitted. There were 74 additional CDs for other candidates at (1.02%)) (40.11%)
February 14	0 (of 24)	Mississippi; County Conventions (Note: This is a partial result from 70 of Mississippi's 82 counties.); 400 SDs	40.6 SDs (10.15%)	-	-	174.3 SDs (43.58%)	-	-	-	3 SDs (0.75%)	-	-	-	37.8 SDs (9.45%)	-	-	-	-	-	100 (Note: Represents Uncommitted)SDs (25.00%)
February 21	19 (of 24)	Mississippi; District Conventions	4 Del.	-	-	9 Del.	-	-	-	-	-	-	-	3 Del.	-	-	-	-	-	3 Del. (Note: Represents Uncommitted)
February 24	0 (of 65)	Minnesota; Caucuses	-	-	-	-	-	-	-	-	(Note: No results were released, but sampling showed that (~50%) of those who attended favored Humphrey)	-	-	-	-	-	-	-	-	3 Del. (Note: Represents Uncommitted)
February 24	17 (of 17)	New Hampshire; Primary; 82,381	15 Del. 23,373 (27.57%)	-	2 Del. 18,710 (22.71%)	1,061 WI (1.29%)	12,510 (15.19%)	-	-	8,863 (10.76%)	4,596 WI (5.58%)	1,857 WI (2.25%)	-	6,743 (8.19%)	1,007 (1.22%)	53 (0.06%)	-	-	-	3,608 (Note: Includes 875 Write-In votes for Ronald Reagan at (1.06%), 828 votes for Arthur Blessit at (1.01%), and 405 Write-In votes for Gerald Ford at (0.49%)) (4.38%)
March 2	104 (of 104)	Massachusetts; Primary; 735,825	16 Del. 101,948 (13.86%)	-	20 Del. 130,440 (17.73%)	21 Del. 123,112 (16.73%)	1 Del. 34,963 (4.75%)	-	-	6 Del. 55,701 (7.57%)	7,851 WI (1.07%)	30 Del. 164,393 (22.34%)	1 Del. 21,693 (2.95%)	8 Del. 53,252 (7.24%)	1 Del. 25,772 (3.50%)	-	-	-	-	15,985 (Note: Includes 9,803 Write-In votes for "None of the Above" at (1.33%), and 1,623 Write-In votes for Senator Edward Kennedy at (0.22%).) (4.38%)
March 2	0 (of 12)	Vermont; Primary; 38,714	16,335 (42.19%)	-	1,235 WI (3.19%)	916 WI (2.37%)	-	-	-	4,893 (12.64%)	-	-	-	10,699 (27.64%)	3,324 (8.59%)	-	-	-	-	1,312 (Note: Scattering.) (3.39%)
March 2	0 (of 53)	Washington; Caucuses (Note: These are partial results; only 2,780 precincts of 6,100 were accounted for here.); 2,676 SDs	28 SDs (1.05%)	1 SD (0.04%)	162 SDs (6.05%)	39 SDs (1.46%)	-	-	2 SDs (0.07%)	11 SDs (0.41%)	19 SDs (0.71%)	2,090 SDs (78.10%)	-	-	-	-	-	-	-	324 SDs (Note: All are Uncommitted.) (12.11%)
March 9	81 (of 81)	Florida; Primary; 1,300,330	34 Del. 448,844 (34.52%)	-	27,235 (2.09%)	26 Del. 396,820 (30.52%)	8,750 (0.67%)	-	4,906 (0.38%)	5,397 (0.42%)	-	21 Del. 310,944 (23.91%)	32,198 (2.48%)	7,084 (0.55%)	7,595 (0.58%)	-	5,042 (0.39%)	-	-	45,515 (Note: Includes 37,626 votes for "No Preference" at (2.89%), and 7,889 votes for Arthur Blessit at (0.61%).) (3.50%)
March 16	0 (of 169)	Illinois; Pres. Primary; 1,311,914	630,915 (48.09%)	-	-	361,798 (27.58%)	-	-	-	98,862 (7.54%)	-	-	-	214,024 (16.31%)	-	-	-	-	-	6,315 (Note: Scattering.) (0.48%)
March 16	155 (of 169)	Illinois; Del. Primary (Note: The Delegate vote is not currently known.) ?	53 Del. ? (?%)	-	? (?%)	3 Del. ? (?%)	? (?%)	? (?%)	-	? (?%)	6 Del. ? (?%)	? (?%)	-	-	-	-	-	-	-	107 Del. ? (Note: The Uncommitted Delegates here represent a number of different camps. The largest with 85 delegates was controlled Chicago Mayor Richard Daley, who had used Senator Adlai Stevenson III as a stand-in. 18 truly uncommitted delegates were divided into two camps, one led by congressman Paul Simon and the other by state treasurer Alan Dixon, both inclined to supporting Hubert Humphrey's potential entrance into the race. The final 4 were pledged to Governor Daniel Walker, who had been engaged in a number of power struggles with Richard Daley..) (?%)
March 20	28 (of 37)	Oklahoma; District Conventions (Note: Only Delegate results are known.) ?	9 Del.	-	-	-	-	-	-	5 Del.	-	-	-	-	-	-	-	-	-	15 Del. (Note: All are Uncommitted.) (40.00%)
March 23	61 (of 61)	North Carolina; Primary; 604,832	36 Del. 324,437 (53.64%)	-	14,032 (2.32%)	25 Del. 210,166 (34.75%)	-	1,675 (0.28%)	-	5,923 (0.98%)	-	25,749 (4.26%)	-	-	-	-	-	-	-	22,850 (Note: All 22,850 votes for "No Preference".) (3.78%)
March 31	31 (of 31)	South Carolina; District Conventions (Note: Only Delegate results are known.)	9 Del.	-	-	8 Del.	-	-	1 Del.	-	-	-	-	-	-	-	-	-	-	13 Del. (Note: All are Uncommitted.)
April 3	0 (of 34)	Kansas; County Conventions (Note: Only Delegate results are known. Returns from 28 counties with 56 delegates are not accounted for.); 664 SDs	232 SDs (34.95%)	-	29 SDs (4.37%)	3 SDs (0.45%)	-	-	2 SDs (0.30%)	13 SDs (1.96%)	-	43 SDs (6.48%)	-	-	-	-	-	-	-	286 SDs (Note: All are Uncommitted.) (43.07%)
April 3	9 (of 37)	Oklahoma; State Convention; 728 SDs	4 Del. 300 SDs (41.21%)	-	-	-	-	-	-	2 Del. 145 SDs (19.92%)	-	-	-	-	-	-	-	-	-	3 Del. 283 SDs (Note: All are Uncommitted.) (38.87%)
April 3	0 (of 54)	Virginia; County Conventions (Note: Only Delegate results are known. Returns from 28 counties with 56 delegates are not accounted for.); 3,040 SDs	655 SDs (21.55%)	-	88 SDs (2.89%)	69 SDs (2.27%)	-	-	-	-	-	-	-	-	-	-	-	-	-	1,350 SDs (Note: All are Uncommitted but 9.) (44.41%)
April 4	22 (of 22)	Puerto Rico; Caucus (Note: The Caucus was initially held in two phases due to fighting which disrupted the first round on February 22, resulting in a second round being held on this date. However, supporters of Carter opted to not participate in the second round, initially allowing Jackson supporters to win the remainder of the delegates. To head off a dispute before the Convention, a compromise was reached in which the delegation would be divided as shown below.)	9 Del.	-	-	-	-	-	-	-	-	12 Del.	-	-	-	-	-	-	-	1 Del.
April 6	274 (of 274)	New York; Del. Primary (Note: The situation in New York is complicated in that the rather than voting for the candidates themselves, voters were instead voting for the individual delegates; it wasn't uncommon for the allegiance of some of these delegates to be ill-defined.)	35 Del.	-	72 Del.	-	-	-	-	-	16 Del.	102 Del.	-	-	-	-	-	-	-	49 Del. (Note: All are Uncommitted.)
April 6	68 (of 68)	Wisconsin; Primary; 740,528	26 Del. 271,220 (36.63%)	-	25 Del. 263,771 (35.62%)	10 Del. 92,460 (12.49%)	1,255 (0.17%)	1,730 (0.23%)	-	8,185 (1.11%)	-	6 Del. 47,605 (6.43%)	596 (0.08%)	5,097 (0.69%)	1 Del. 26,982 (3.64%)	-	-	-	-	21,627 (Note: Includes 7,154 votes for "None of the Names Shown" at (0.97%), and 14,473 Write-In votes at (1.95%); the Write-Ins were not broken down on the State level.) (2.92%)
April 10	40 (of 47)	Iowa; District Conventions; 3,431	17 Del.	-	10 Del.	-	-	-	-	2 Del.	-	-	-	-	-	-	-	-	-	11 Del. (Note: All are Uncommitted.)
April 21	0 (of 71)	Missouri; County Conventions; 839 SDs	112 SDs (13.35%)	2 SDs (0.24%)	28 SDs (3.34%)	18 SDs (2.15%)	-	-	-	2 SDs (0.24%)	18 SDs (2.15%)	18 SDs (2.15%)	-	-	21 SDs (2.50%)	-	-	-	-	589 SDs (Note: Includes 547 for Uncommitted, and 42 for other candidates or undetermined) (70.20%)
April 23	10 (of 10)	Alaska; State Convention	-	-	-	-	-	-	-	-	-	-	-	-	-	-	-	-	-	10 Del. (Note: All are Uncommitted.)
April 24	30 (of 65)	Minnesota; District Conventions (Note: Only five of eight districts held conventions on this date.)	-	-	-	-	-	-	-	-	23 Del.	-	-	-	-	-	-	-	-	7 Del. (Note: All are Uncommitted.)
April 26	25 (of 25)	Arizona; Caucuses; 26,703	4 Del. 2,704 (10.13%)	-	20 Del. 19,074 (71.43%)	1 Del. 1,793 (6.72%)	-	-	391 (1.46%)	96 (0.36%)	-	1,495 (5.60%)	-	-	318 (1.19%)	-	-	-	-	832 (Note: Includes 797 votes for Uncommitted Delegates at (2.99%).) (3.12%)
April 27	171 (Note: Technically none of the delegates were apportioned based on the Presidential Primary; 134 of Pennsylvania's 178 delegates were elected in a separate series of primaries held concurrently, with 44 apportioned based on the number of delegate to each candidate based on the number of delegate contests won.) (of 178)	Pennsylvania; Primary; 1,311,914	64 Del. 511,905 (36.95%)	-	22 Del.259,166 (18.71%)	3 Del. 155,902 (11.25%)	15,320 (1.11%)	-	-	13,067 (0.94%)	12,859 WI (0.93%)	19 Del. 340,340 (24.57%)	17 Del. 32,947 (2.38%)	-	38,800 (2.80%)	-	-	-	-	46 Del. (Note: All are Uncommitted.); 5,093 (Note: Scattered Write-Ins.) (0.37%)
May 1	32 (of 41)	Louisiana; Del. Primary	10 Del.	-	-	7 Del.	-	-	-	-	-	-	-	-	-	-	-	-	-	15 Del. (Note: All are Uncommitted.)
May 1	98 (of 98)	Texas; Primary; 1,545,068	92 Del. 736,161 (47.65%)	-	-	270,798 (17.53%)	-	6 Del. 343,032 (22.20%)	-	31,379 (2.03%)	-	-	-	28,520 (1.85%)	5,700 (0.37%)	-	-	-	-	129,478 (Note: All for "Uncommitted".) (8.38%)
May 2	19 (of 65)	Minnesota; District Conventions (Note: Remaining three of eight districts that hadn't held conventions back in April.)	-	-	-	-	-	-	-	-	15 Del.	-	-	-	-	-	-	-	-	4 Del. (Note: All are Uncommitted.)
May 4	27 (of 35)	Alabama; Del. Primary (Note: As majorities were required, run-offs were held later (May 25th) in those delegate primaries that only resulted in a plurality. No vote totals were given.)	-	-	-	12 Del.	-	-	-	-	-	-	-	-	-	-	-	-	-	2 Del.
May 4	50 (of 50)	Georgia; Primary; 502,471	50 Del. 419,272 (83.44%)	-	9,755 (1.94%)	57,594 (11.46%)	824 (0.16%)	277 (0.06%)	2,477 (0.49%)	699 (0.14%)	-	3,358 (0.67%)	181 (0.04%)	1,378 (0.27%)	635 (0.13%)	-	3,628 (0.72%)	-	-	2,393 (Note: Scattering.) (0.48%)
May 4	69 (of 69)	Indiana; Primary; 614,389	48 Del. 417,480 (67.95%)	-	-	93,121 (15.16%)	-	-	-	-	-	72,080 (11.73%)	-	-	31,708 (5.16%)	-	-	-	-	21 Del. (Note: All are Uncommitted.)
May 4	13 (of 13)	Washington D.C. Primary; 33,291	4 Del. 10,521 (31.60%)	-	4 Del. 6,999 (21.02%)	-	-	-	-	461 (1.39%)	-	-	-	-	-	-	-	4 Del. 10,149 (30.49%)	1 Del. 5,161 (15.50%)	-
May 8	9 (of 41)	Louisiana; Del. Primary	3 Del.	-	-	2 Del.	-	-	-	-	-	-	-	-	-	-	-	-	-	4 Del. (Note: All are Uncommitted.)
May 8	7 (of 7)	Wyoming; State Convention	1 Del.	1 Del.	1 Del.	-	-	-	-	-	-	-	-	-	-	-	-	-	-	4 Del. (Note: All are "Uncommitted".)
May 9	20 (of 20)	Maine; State Convention	9 Del.	-	5 Del.	-	-	-	-	-	-	-	-	-	-	-	-	-	-	6 Del.
May 11	0 (of 51)	Connecticut; Primary; 106,803	35,415 (33.16%)	-	32,959 (30.86%)	-	-	-	-	178 (0.17%)	-	18,962 (17.75%)	-	-	5,515 (5.16%)	-	-	-	-	13,774 (Note: All for "Uncommitted".) (12.90%)
May 11	0 (of 71)	Missouri; County Conventions (Note: These are counties that did not hold their County Conventions on April 21st.); 156 SDs	47 SDs (30.13%)	-	-	-	-	-	-	-	-	-	-	-	-	-	-	-	-	101 SDs (64.74%)
May 11	23 (of 23)	Nebraska; Primary; 175,013	8 Del. 65,833 (37.62%)	-	4,688 (2.68%)	5,567 (3.18%)	407 (0.23%)	-	15 Del. 67,297 (38.45%)	811 (0.46%)	12,685 (7.25%)	2,642 (1.51%)	-	384 (0.22%)	6,033 (3.45%)	-	-	-	-	8,666 (Note: Includes 7,199 votes for Senator Ted Kennedy and 1,467 scattered Write-Ins.) (4.95%)
May 11	33 (of 33)	West Virginia; Primary; 372,577	-	-	-	40,938 (10.99%)	-	-	-	-	-	-	-	-	-	-	331,639 (89.01%)	-	-	33 Del. (Note: By law the delegates were Uncommitted, regardless of the result of the primary.)
May 15	18 (of 18)	New Mexico; State Convention	8 Del.	-	6 Del.	-	-	-	-	-	-	-	-	-	-	-	-	-	-	4 Del.
May 17	17 (of 17)	Utah; Caucus; 74,405	4 Del.	-	-	-	-	-	5 Del.	-	-	-	-	-	-	-	-	-	-	9 Del. (Note: All are "Uncommitted".)
May 18	53 (of 53)	Maryland; Primary	32 Del. 219,404 (37.08%)	286,672 (48.45%)	7 Del. 32,790 (5.54%)	24,176 (4.09%)	-	-	-	6,841 (1.16%)	-	10 Del. 13,956 (2.36%)	-	-	7,907 (1.34%)	-	-	-	-	4 Del. (Note: All are "Uncommitted".)
May 18	133 (of 133)	Michigan; Primary; 708,666	69 Del. 307,559 (43.40%)	-	58 Del. 305,134 (43.06%)	2 Del. 49,204 (6.94%)	-	-	-	4,081 (0.58%)	-	10,332 (1.46%)	-	-	7,623 (1.08%)	-	-	-	-	4 Del. (Note: All are "Uncommitted".); 18,995 (Note: 15,853 votes are for "Uncommitted" at (2.24%), and there are 3,142 Write-In votes at (0.44%).) (2.68%)
May 22	12 (of 12)	Vermont; State Convention	3 Del.	2 Del.	3 Del.	-	-	-	-	-	-	-	-	-	-	-	-	-	-	4 Del. (Note: All are "Uncommitted".)
May 22	54 (of 54)	Virginia; District Conventions	23 Del.	-	7 Del.	-	-	-	-	-	-	-	-	-	-	-	-	-	-	24 Del.
May 22	40 (of 53)	Washington; District Conventions	-	-	5 Del.	-	-	-	-	-	-	24 Del.	-	-	-	-	-	-	-	11 Del.
May 25	27 (of 35)	Alabama; Del. Primary (Note: These were run-offs for those races on May 4th in which a majority was not reached.)	2 Del.	-	-	4 Del.	-	-	-	-	-	-	-	-	-	-	-	-	-	2 Del.
May 25	26 (of 26)	Arkansas; Primary; 501,764	17 Del. 314,277 (62.63%)	-	1 Del. 37,783 (7.53%)	5 Del. 83,005 (16.54%)	-	-	-	-	-	9,554 (1.90%)	-	-	-	-	-	-	-	3 Del. 57,145 (11.39%)
May 25	16 (of 16)	Idaho; Primary; 74,405	2 Del. 8,818 (11.85%)	1,453 WI (1.95%)	981 (1.32%)	1,115 (1.50%)	-	-	14 Del. 58,570 (78.72%)	319 (0.43%)	1,700 (2.29%)	485 (0.65%)	-	-	-	-	-	-	-	964 (Note: All for "None of the Names Shown".) (1.30%)
May 25	46 (of 46)	Kentucky; Primary; 306,006	37 Del. 181,690 (59.38%)	-	2 Del. 33,262 (10.87%)	7 Del. 51,540 (16.84%)	-	-	-	-	-	8,186 (2.68%)	-	-	17,061 (5.58%)	-	-	-	-	14,267 (Note: Includes 11,962 votes for an Uncommitted slate at (3.91%).) (4.66%)
May 25	54 (of 71)	Missouri; District Conventions	28 Del.	-	3 Del.	-	-	-	-	-	-	1 Del.	-	-	1 Del.	-	-	-	-	21 Del.
May 25	11 (of 11)	Nevada; Primary; 75,242	3 Del. 17,567 (23.35%)	6 Del. 39,671 (52.73%)	2,237 (2.97%)	2,490 (3.31%)	-	-	1 Del. 6,778 (9.01%)	-	-	1,896 (2.52%)	-	-	-	-	-	-	-	1 Del. 4,603 (Note: All votes for "None of the Above".) (6.12%)
May 25	34 (of 34)	Oregon; Primary; 432,632	12 Del. 115,310 (26.65%)	7 Del. 106,812 WI (24.69%)	11,747 (2.72%)	5,797 (1.34%)	743 (0.17%)	-	15 Del. 145,394 (33.61%)	-	22,488 (5.20%)	5,298 (1.23%)	-	3,753 (0.87%)	-	-	-	-	-	13,946 (Note: Includes 10,983 votes for Senator Ted Kennedy at (2.54%), 1,389 Write-In votes for Ronald Reagan at (0.32%), and 691 Write-In votes for Gerald Ford at (0.16%).) (3.22%)
May 25	46 (of 46)	Tennessee; Primary; 334,078	36 Del. 259,243 (77.60%)	1,556 WI (0.47%)	12,420 (3.72%)	1 Del. 36,495 (10.92%)	-	-	8,026 (2.40%)	1,628 (0.49%)	109 WI (0.03%)	5,672 (1.70%)	507 (0.15%)	-	1,782 (0.53%)	-	-	-	-	9 Del. (Note: All are Uncommitted.); 6,640 (Note: Includes 11,962 votes for an Uncommitted slate at (1.84%).) (1.99%)
May 29	7 (of 45)	Iowa; State Convention	3 Del.	-	2 Del.	-	-	-	-	-	-	-	-	-	-	-	-	-	-	2 Del. (Note: All are Uncommitted.)
May 30	17 (of 17)	Hawaii; State Convention	-	-	1 Del.	-	-	-	-	-	-	1 Del.	-	-	-	-	-	-	-	15 Del. (Note: All are Uncommitted.)
June 1	17 (of 17)	Montana; Primary; 106,841	4 Del. 26,329 (24.64%)	-	6,708 (6.28%)	3,680 (3.44%)	-	-	11 Del. 63,448 (59.39%)	-	-	2,856 (2.67%)	-	-	-	-	-	-	-	2 Del. 3,820 (Note: All votes are for "No Preference".) (3.58%)
June 1	22 (of 22)	Rhode Island; Primary; 60,348	7 Del. 18,237 (30.22%)	-	2,543 (4.21%)	507 (0.84%)	247 (0.41%)	-	6 Del. 16,423 (27.21%)	-	-	756 (1.25%)	132 (0.22%)	-	2,468 (4.09%)	-	-	-	-	9 Del. 19,035 (Note: All votes are for an Uncommitted slate.) (31.54%)
June 1	17 (of 17)	South Dakota; Primary; 58,671	9 Del. 24,186 (41.22%)	-	7 Del. 19,510 (33.25%)	1,412 (2.41%)	-	-	-	573 (0.98%)	-	558 (0.95%)	-	-	4,561 (7.77%)	-	-	-	-	1 Del. 7,871 (Note: All votes are for "No Preference".) (13.42%)
June 6	16 (of 65)	Minnesota; State Convention	-	-	-	-	-	-	-	-	13 Del.	-	-	-	-	-	-	-	-	3 Del. (Note: All are Uncommitted.)
June 8	300 (of 300)	California; Primary; 3,409,701	67 Del. 697,092 (20.44%)	204 Del. 2,013,210 (59.04%)	2 Del. 171,501 (5.03%)	102,292 (3.00%)	-	-	7 Del. 250,581 (7.35%)	-	-	38,634 (1.13%)	-	-	-	-	-	-	-	78,595 (Note: All votes for an Uncommitted slate.) (2.31%)
June 8	0 (of 108)	New Jersey; Pres. Primary; 360,839	210,655 (58.38%)	-	-	31,183 (8.64%)	-	-	49,034 (13.59%)	-	-	31,820 (8.82%)	-	-	21,774 (6.03%)	-	-	-	-	16,373 (4.54%)
June 8	108 (of 108)	New Jersey; Del. Primary; 462,859	25 Del. 129,455 (27.97%)	-	59,365 (12.83%)	28,944 (6.25%)	-	-	30,722 (6.64%)	-	-	-	-	-	19,700 (4.26%)	-	-	-	-	83 Del. 194,673 (Note: All votes for an Uncommitted slate.) (42.06%)
June 8	152 (of 152)	Ohio; Primary; 1,134,374	126 Del. 593,130 (52.29%)	-	20 Del. 240,342 (21.19%)	63,953 (5.64%)	-	-	157,884 (13.92%)	-	-	35,404 (3.12%)	-	-	-	-	-	-	-	6 Del. (Note: All are pledged to Mayor Carl Stokes.); 43,661 (Note: All votes are for Ohio State Treasurer Gertrude Donahey.) (3.85%)
June 11	12 (of 12)	Delaware; District Conventions	10 Del.	-	-	-	-	-	-	-	-	-	-	-	-	-	-	-	-	2 Del.
June 12	51 (of 51)	Connecticut; District Conventions	19 Del.	-	16 Del.	-	-	-	-	-	-	8 Del.	-	-	-	-	-	-	-	8 Del.
June 12	13 (of 53)	Washington; State Convention	-	-	2 Del.	-	-	-	-	-	-	8 Del.	-	-	-	-	-	-	-	3 Del.
June 25	35 (of 35)	Colorado; District Conventions	10 Del.	5 Del.	4 Del.	-	-	-	3 Del.	-	-	-	-	-	-	-	-	-	-	9 Del.
June 26	35 (of 35)	Colorado; State Convention	2 Del.	1 Del.	1 Del.	-	-	-	-	-	-	-	-	-	-	-	-	-	-	-
June 26	13 (of 13)	North Dakota; State Convention	7 Del.	-	-	-	-	-	-	-	-	-	-	-	-	-	-	-	-	6 Del.
Total; 3,008 pledged delegates 17,697,105 votes			1,130 7,020,624 (39.67%)	226 2,449,374 (13.84%)	328 1,667,362 (9.42%)	146 2,268,895 (12.82%)	1 80,167 (0.45%)	6 346,714 (1.96%)	78 831,209 (4.70%)	15 251,818 (1.42%)	75 62,288 (0.35%)	242 1,153,766 (6.52%)	18 88,254 (0.50%)	11 332,221 (1.88%)	3 216,565 (1.22%)	0 53 (0.00%)	0 340,309 (1.92%)	4 10,149 (0.06%)	1 5,161 (0.03%)	593 578,573 (3.27%)

== Candidates ==
=== Nominee ===
Candidate	Most recent office	Home state	Campaign Withdrawal date	Popular vote	Contests won	Running mate	Ref.
Jimmy Carter	Governor of Georgia (1971–1975)	Georgia	(Campaign • Positions); Secured nomination: July 15, 1976	6,235,609 (39.19%)	30; ME, NH, VT, CT, RI, NJ, DE, PA, VA, NC, FL, GA, TN, KY, OH, MI, IL, IN, WI, IA, LA, AR, MO, TX, OK, KS, CO, NM, SD, DC	Walter Mondale	

=== Eliminated at convention ===
Candidate	Most recent office	Home state	Campaign Withdrawal date	Popular vote	Contests won	Ref.
Jerry Brown	Governor of California (1975–1983; 2011–2019)	California	Declared: March 16, 1976	2,449,374 (15.4%)	3 CA, MD, NV	
Mo Udall	U.S. Representative for Arizona's 2nd congressional district (1961–1991)	Arizona	Declared: November 23, 1974	1,611,754 (10.13%)	3 AZ, HI, WY	
Ellen McCormack	Chair of the New York Right to Life Party (1970–1976)	New York		238,027 (1.50%)	None	

=== Withdrew before convention ===
Candidate	Most recent office	Home state	Campaign Withdrawal date	Popular vote	Contests won	Ref.
Frank Church	U.S. Senator from Idaho (1957–1981)	Idaho	Announced campaign: March 18, 1976; Withdrew: June 14, 1976 (endorsed Carter)	830,818 (5.22%)	5 ID, MT, NE, OR, UT	
George Wallace	Governor of Alabama (1963–1967; 1971–1979; 1983–1987)	Alabama	Declared: November 1, 1975; Withdrew: June 9, 1976 (endorsed Carter)	1,955,388 (13.76%)	3 AL, MS, SC	
Henry M. Jackson	U.S. Senator from Washington (1953–1983)	Washington	Declared: February 1, 1975; Withdrew: May 1, 1976	1,134,375 (7.13%)	4 AK, MA, NY, WA	
Fred Harris	U.S. Senator from Oklahoma (1964–1973)	Oklahoma	Declared: January 11, 1975; Withdrew: April 2, 1976	234,568 (1.47%)	None	
Sargent Shriver	U. S. Ambassador to France (1968–1970)	Maryland	Declared: September 20, 1975; Withdrew: March 16, 1976	304,399 (1.91%)	None	
Milton Shapp	Governor of Pennsylvania (1971–1979)	Pennsylvania	Declared: September 25, 1975; Withdrew: March 12, 1976	88,254 (0.56%)	None	
Birch Bayh	U.S. Senator from Indiana (1963–1981)	Indiana	Declared: October 21, 1975; Withdrew: March 4, 1976	86,438 (0.54%)	None	
Lloyd Bentsen	U.S. Senator from Texas (1971–1993)	Texas	Declared: February 17, 1975; Withdrew: February 10, 1976	4,046 (0.03%)	None	
Terry Sanford	Governor of North Carolina (1961–1965)	North Carolina	Declared:June 1, 1975; Withdrew: January 25, 1976	404 (0.00%)	None	

=== Favorite son candidates ===
The following candidates ran only in their home state or district's delegate elections for the purpose of controlling those delegates at the national convention:

- Senator Robert C. Byrd of West Virginia
- Mayor Walter Washington of the District of Columbia
- Delegate Walter Fauntroy of the District of Columbia

=== Declined to run ===
- Former Governor John J. Gilligan of Ohio
- Former Vice President Hubert Humphrey of Minnesota

At multiple times during the primaries, Humphrey hinted at a campaign for the nomination and expressed his willingness to be drafted, but ultimately declined to actively seek the nomination on April 29, after Carter's victory in Pennsylvania. Several unsuccessful draft movements were formed and many uncommitted delegates expressed their preference for Humphrey.

- Senator Ted Kennedy of Massachusetts
- Mayor of New York City John Lindsay
- Senator George McGovern of South Dakota
- Senator Walter Mondale of Minnesota (formed exploratory committee)
- Senator Edmund Muskie of Maine
- Senator Adlai Stevenson III of Illinois
- Senator John Tunney of California

== Polling ==
=== National polling ===
==== Before August 1974 ====
Poll source	Publication	Sample size	Birch Bayh	Scoop Jackson	Ted Kennedy	George McGovern	Edmund Muskie	Adlai Stevenson III	George Wallace	Other	Undecided
Gallup	July 14, 1973	659 A	–	4%	40%	8%	9%	3%	16%	16% (Note: Hubert Humphrey with 8%, John Lindsay with 2%, Sargent Shriver with 2%, and Reubin Askew, Walter Mondale, William Proxmire, and John Tunney with 1% each)	9%
Gallup	Nov. 2–5, 1973	627	3%	6%	41%	6%	9%	4%	15%	6% (Note: Walter Mondale and William Proxmire with 2% each, and Robert Byrd and John Tunney with 1% each)	10%
Gallup	Nov. 2–5, 1973	627	5%	9%	–	16%	17%	7%	20%	12% (Note: William Proxmire with 4%, Walter Mondale and John Tunney with 3% each, and Robert Byrd with 2%)	14%
Gallup	Feb. 22–March 4, 1974	677	2%	8%	44%	7%	7%	2%	17%	5% (Note: Walter Mondale with 2% and William Proxmire, John Tunney, and Robert Byrd with 1% each)	6%
Gallup	Feb. 22–March 4, 1974	677	3%	11%	49%	8%	10%	5%	–	7% (Note: Walter Mondale with 2%, William Proxmire with 2%, John Tunney with 2%, and Robert Byrd with 1%)	7%
Gallup	Feb. 22–March 4, 1974	677	3%	13%	–	20%	13%	7%	26%	8% (Note: Walter Mondale with 3%, John Tunney and William Proxmire with 2% each, and Robert Byrd with 1%)	10%

==== August 1974–January 1976 ====
Poll source	Publication	Sample size	Birch Bayh	Jimmy Carter	Hubert Humphrey	Scoop Jackson	Ted Kennedy	George McGovern	Edmund Muskie	Sargent Shriver	George Wallace	Other	Undecided
Gallup	Sept. 27, 1974	?	–	–	–	9%	46%	6%	8%	–	16%	8% (Note: William Proxmire with 3%, Eugene McCarthy with 3%, and Walter Mondale with 2%)	7%
Gallup	Sept. 27, 1974	?	–	–	–	14%	–	17%	17%	–	28%	14% (Note: Eugene McCarthy with 7%, William Proxmire with 5%, and Walter Mondale with 2%)	11%
Gallup	Dec. 5, 1974	?	2%	–	11%	10%	–	6%	6%	1%	19%	30% (Note: John Lindsay with 3%, Julian Bond with 3%, Adlai Stevenson III with 3%, Ralph Nader with 2%, Walter Mondale with 2%, Lloyd Bentsen with 2%, Jerry Brown with 2%, John Glenn with 2%; Reubin Askew, John Tunney, William Proxmire, Dale Bumpers, Robert Byrd, Hugh Carey, Thomas Eagleton, Eugene McCarthy, Gary Hart, Ella Grasso, and Milton Shapp with 1% each; and Brendan Byrne, Terry Sanford, Frank Church, Mo Udall, and Kevin White with <1% each)	15%
Gallup	March 31, 1975	?	–	–	16%	13%	–	10%	9%	–	22%	21% (Note: Gallup did not break down results for other candidates individually.)	9%
Gallup	May 2–5, 1975	675	–	–	9%	6%	36%	2%	4%	–	15%	28%	
Gallup	Aug. 7, 1975	?	–	–	9%	6%	42%	5%	6%	–	15%	17%	
Gallup	Aug. 7, 1975	?	–	–	20%	10%	–	11%	10%	2%	23%	12%	12%
Gallup	Oct. 26, 1975	?	–	–	13%	11%	35%	4%	5%	4%	14%	9%	8%
Gallup	Oct. 26, 1975	?	–	–	23%	11%	–	9%	9%	8%	20%	9%	9%
Gallup	Nov. 21–24, 1975	622	4%	2%	21%	6%	29%	8%	4%	–	15%	11%	
Gallup	Nov. 21–24, 1975	622	5%	–	30%	10%	–	10%	7%	4%	20%	14%	
Gallup	Jan. 2–5, 1976	?	–	4%	20%	6%	32%	5%	4%	–	15%	9%	
Gallup	Jan. 2–5, 1976	?	5%	–	29%	9%	–	10%	6%	5%	20%	16%	

==== 1976 ====
Poll source	Publication	Jerry Brown	Jimmy Carter	Frank Church	Hubert Humphrey	Scoop Jackson	Sargent Shriver	George Wallace
Gallup	Jan. 1976	–	4%	2%	27%	6%	6%	22%
Gallup	Mar. 1976	–	26%	–	27%	15%	3%	15%
Gallup	Mar. 1976	–	28%	–	30%	11%	3%	16%
Gallup	Mar. 1976	9%	29%	3%	30%	7%	–	13%
Gallup	Apr. 1976	6%	28%	2%	31%	8%	–	13%
Gallup	May 1976	6%	39%	4%	30%	4%	–	9%
Gallup	May 1976	15%	36%	4%	28%	–	–	9%
Gallup	June 1976	15%	53%	3%	13%	–	–	7%

=== Head-to-head polling ===
Kennedy v. Wallace

Poll source	Publication	Sample size	Ted Kennedy	George Wallace	Undecided
Gallup	July 14, 1973	659 A	71%	22%	7%
Gallup	May 2–5, 1975	676	69%	24%	7%

Kennedy v. Muskie

Poll source	Publication	Sample size	Ted Kennedy	Edmund Muskie	Undecided
Gallup	July 14, 1973	659 A	64%	26%	10%
Gallup	May 2–5, 1975	676	70%	22%	8%

Kennedy v. Jackson

Poll source	Publication	Sample size	Ted Kennedy	Scoop Jackson	Undecided
Gallup	May 2–5, 1975	676	70%	23%	7%

== Timeline ==
Nominee
Ended campaigns
Iowa caucuses
Massachusetts primary
Pennsylvania primary
Convention 1976

=== January 19: Iowa caucuses ===
With no clear front-runner for the nomination and a political climate that seemed tilted heavily in their party's favor, a record number of Democrats competed for their party's presidential nomination.

Jimmy Carter startled many political experts by finishing second in the Iowa caucuses, behind only "uncommitted" delegates largely elected on the backs of minor candidates and Humphrey supporters. Arizona Congressman Morris Udall, who had been leading in the polls at one point, came in fifth behind former Oklahoma Senator Fred R. Harris, leading Harris to coin the term "winnowed in", referring to his surprisingly strong showing.

=== February 24: New Hampshire primary ===
The New Hampshire primary was another victory for Carter, albeit one in which he was the lone moderate or conservative candidate in the field, both Jackson and Wallace choosing to bypass New Hampshire in favor of neighboring Massachusetts. Thus, with the liberal vote split, Carter won. The New Hampshire primary nevertheless had symbolic value for the Carter campaign, showing that a Southerner could appeal in New England in advance of the Massachusetts primary. Among the liberal candidates in New Hampshire, Udall emerged as the leader.

=== March 2: Massachusetts primary ===
One week after the New Hampshire primary, Carter's campaign was dealt a serious blow in Massachusetts. With Jackson and Wallace joining the field to split moderate and conservative voters, Carter finished fourth, behind Jackson, Wallace, and Udall. None of the candidates campaigned heavily in the state, preferring to advertise on television. Jackson won the race by relying on experienced political activists, especially in Boston, and support from organized labor.

=== March 9: Florida primary ===
The week after Massachusetts, Carter righted the ship by defeating Wallace and Jackson in Florida. The liberal candidates, with the exception of Milton Shapp, were not on the ballot and largely stayed out of the state; Jackson finished third. Jackson sought to capitalize on momentum from his victory in Massachusetts, but set expectations low given his poor polling in the state. The campaign was acrimonious; Carter sought to maintain his status as the frontrunner by accusing Washington insiders of coordinating against him and accused Jackson of exploiting desegregation busing as an issue. Jackson countered with attacks on Carter's civil rights record as Governor. Wallace, who had won Florida in 1972, staked his campaign on the state. Carter ultimately defeated Wallace narrowly with around a third of the vote; in his victory speech, Carter declared that the result represented "not only a New South, but a new America."

=== March 16: Illinois primary ===
Carter then proceeded to slowly but steadily accumulate delegates in primaries around the nation. In Illinois, the Democratic presidential candidates were overshadowed by a power struggle between Chicago mayor Richard J. Daley and Governor Dan Walker. Daley won control of the delegation through a slate of delegates pledged to Senator Adlai Stevenson III, but among the declared candidates for the presidency, Carter won a convincing victory over Wallace in both the presidential preference primary and the separate delegate selection races.

=== April: New York, Wisconsin, and Pennsylvania ===
Carter also knocked his key rivals out of the race one by one. He won a more dominant victory over Wallace in the North Carolina primary on March 23, winning his first majority in any state and thus neutralizing his main rival in the South. On April 6, Carter won a narrow come-from-behind victory in Wisconsin over Mo Udall, although Udall won the most delegates. Jackson won a convincing victory over Udall in the New York primaries, but when Carter defeated Jackson in Pennsylvania on April 27, Jackson quit the race, citing a lack of funds.

As Carter continued to gain momentum, a "Stop Carter" movement formed behind the late-starting campaigns of California Governor Jerry Brown and Senator Frank Church of Idaho. Though neither candidate could secure the nomination themselves, they stood in the hopes of deadlocking the convention and denying Carter the nomination. Now facing an organized opposition, Carter dropped several key Western primaries in May and June.

Total popular vote in primaries

- Jimmy Carter - 6,235,609 (39.19%)
- Jerry Brown - 2,449,374 (15.39%)
- George Wallace - 1,955,388 (12.29%)
- Mo Udall - 1,611,754 (10.13%)
- Henry M. Jackson - 1,134,375 (7.13%)
- Frank Church - 830,818 (5.22%)
- Robert Byrd - 340,309 (2.14%)
- Sargent Shriver - 304,399 (1.91%)
- Ellen McCormack - 238,027 (1.50%)
- Fred R. Harris - 234,568 (1.47%)
- Milton Shapp - 88,254 (0.56%)
- Birch Bayh - 86,438 (0.54%)
- Walter Fauntroy - 10,149 (0.05%)
- Arthur O. Blessitt – 8,717 (0.06%)
- Walter Washington - 5,161 (0.03%)
- Lloyd Bentsen - 4,046 (0.03%)
- Terry Sanford - 404 (0.00%)

== Democratic National Convention ==
The 1976 Democratic National Convention was held in New York City. By the time the convention opened Carter already had more than enough delegates to win the nomination, and so the major emphasis at the convention was to create an appearance of party unity, which had been lacking in the 1968 and 1972 Democratic Conventions. Carter easily won the nomination on the first ballot; he then chose Senator Walter Mondale of Minnesota, a liberal and a protege of Hubert Humphrey, as his running mate.

The tally at the convention was:

- Jimmy Carter - 2,239 (74.48%)
- Mo Udall - 330 (10.98%)
- Jerry Brown - 301 (10.01%)
- George Wallace - 57 (1.90%)
- Ellen McCormack - 22 (0.73%)
- Frank Church - 19 (0.63%)
- Hubert Humphrey - 10 (0.33%)
- Henry M. Jackson - 10 (0.33%)
- Fred R. Harris - 9 (0.30%)
- Milton Shapp - 2 (0.07%)
- Robert Byrd, Cesar Chavez, Leon Jaworski, Barbara Jordan, Ted Kennedy, Jennings Randolph, Fred Stover - each 1 vote (0.03%)

=== Vice presidential nomination ===
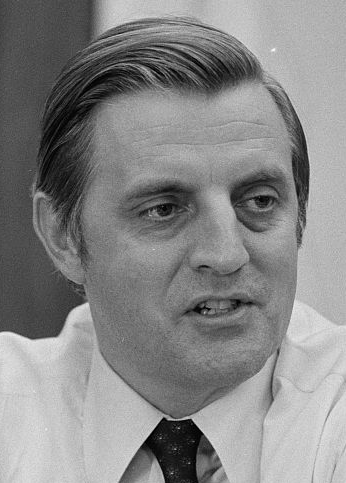
Senator Walter F. Mondale of Minnesota

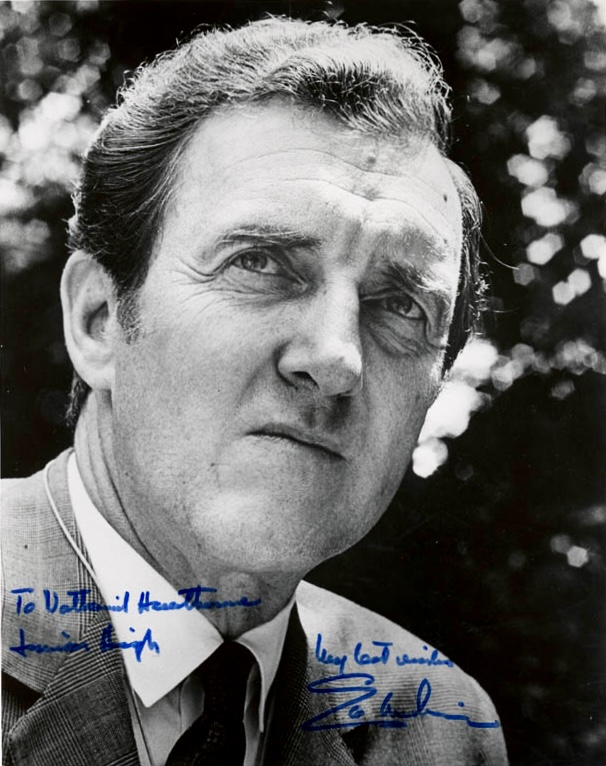
Senator Edmund S. Muskie of Maine

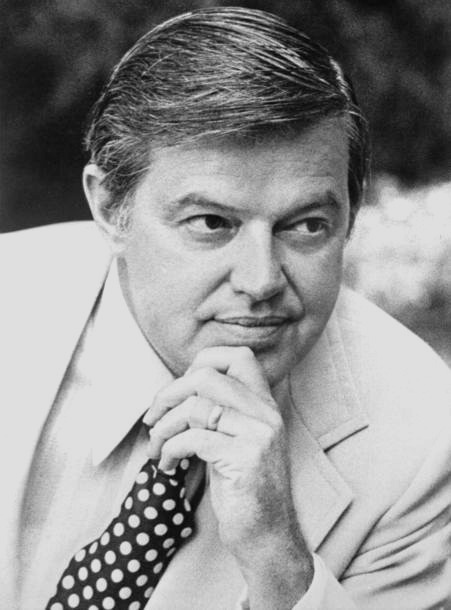
Senator Frank Church of Idaho

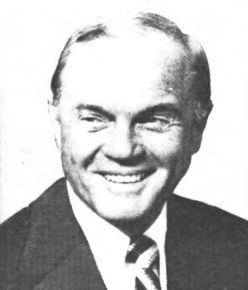
Senator John Glenn of Ohio

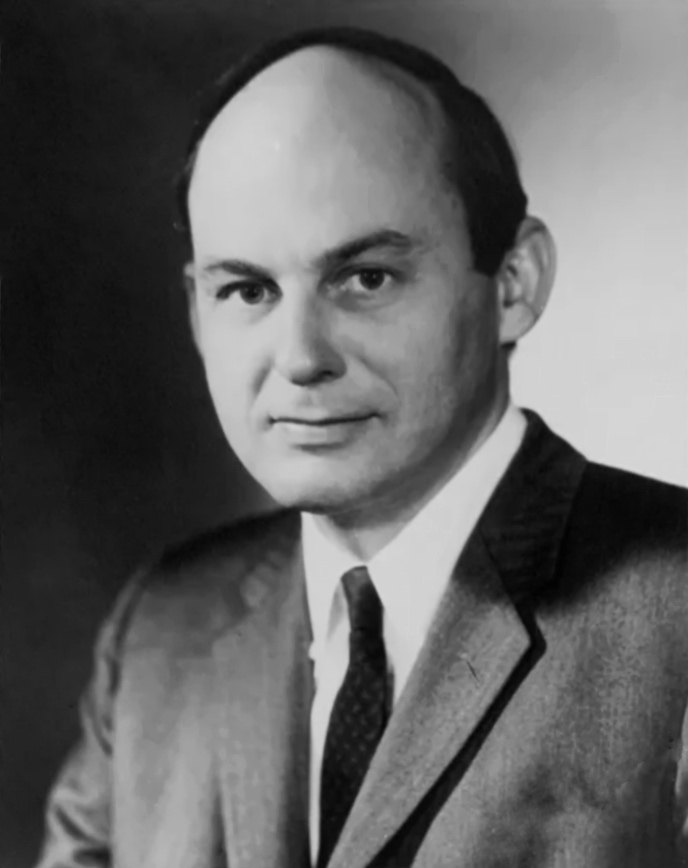
Senator Adlai Stevenson III of Illinois

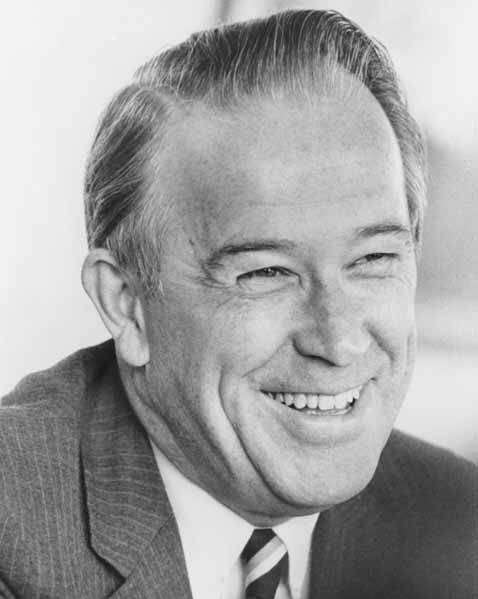
Senator Henry M. Jackson of Washington

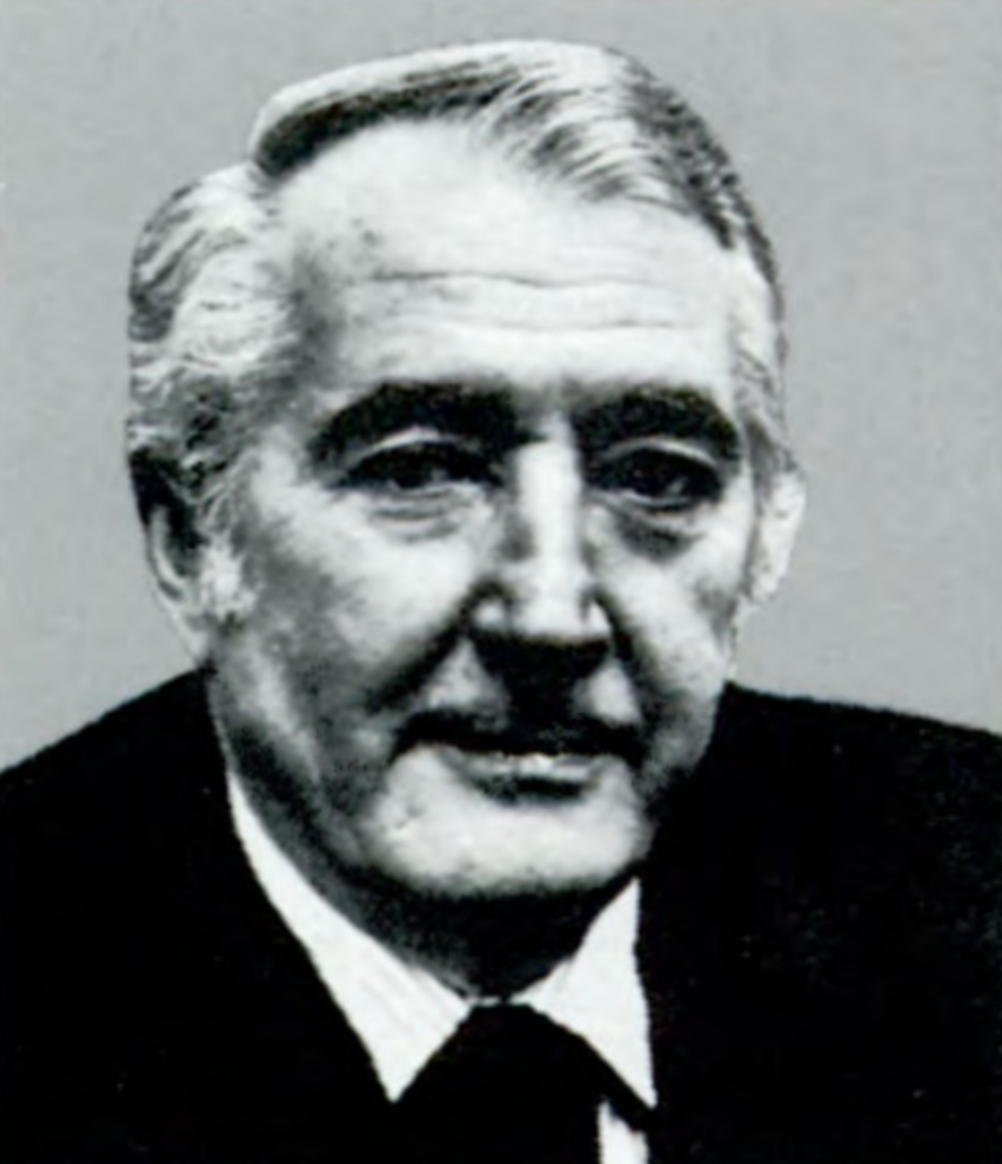
Congressman Peter W. Rodino of New Jersey

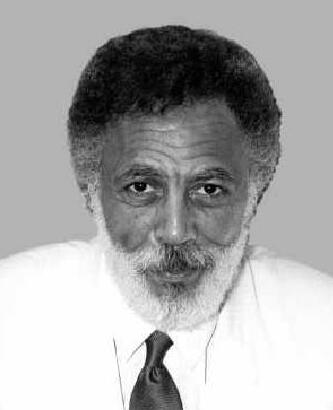
Congressman Ron Dellums of California

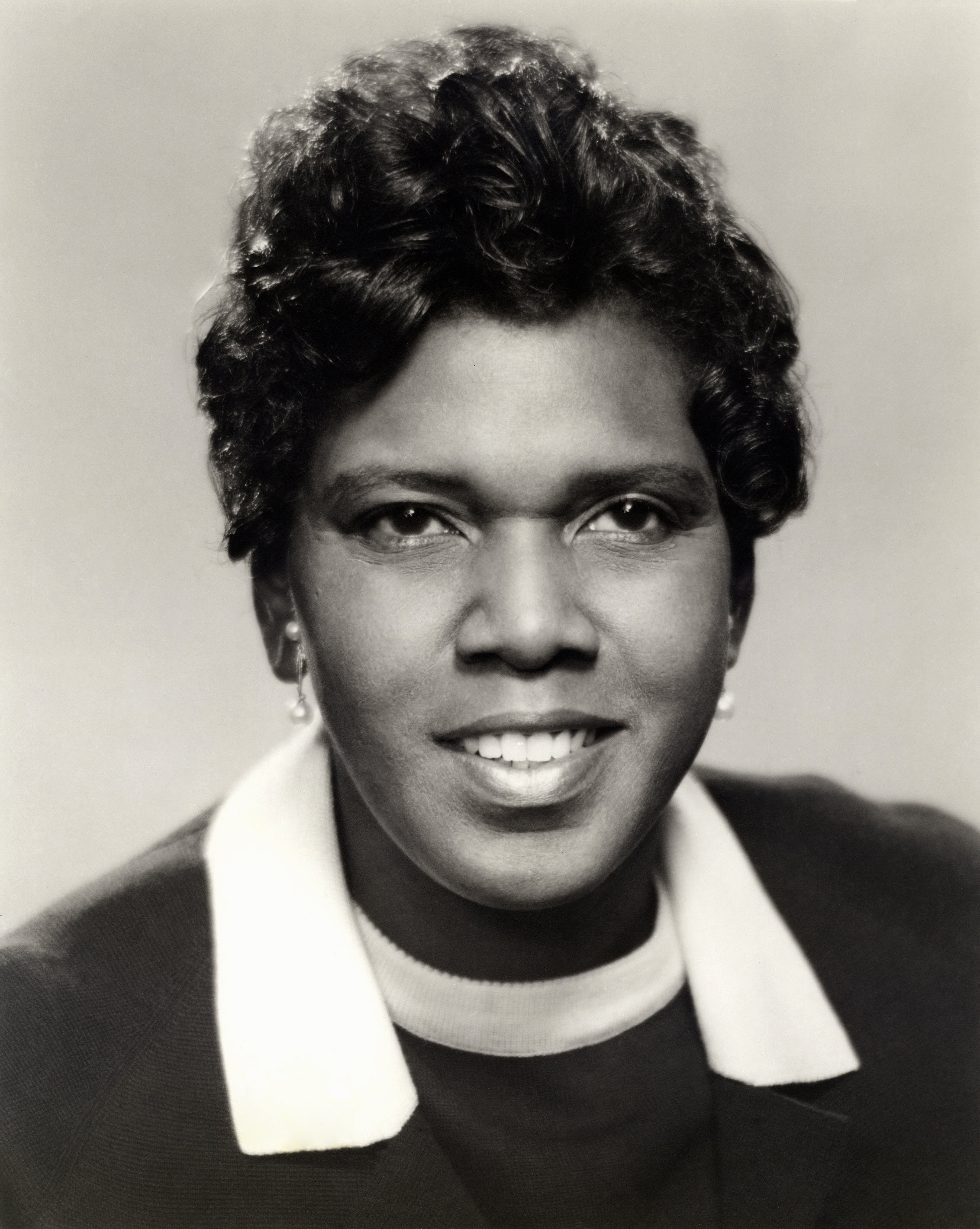
Congresswoman Barbara Jordan of Texas

By June, Carter had the nomination sufficiently locked up and could take time to interview potential vice-presidential candidates.

The pundits predicted that Frank Church would be tapped to provide balance as an experienced senator with strong liberal credentials. Church promoted himself, persuading friends to intervene with Carter in his behalf. If a quick choice had been required as in past conventions, Carter later recalled, he would probably have chosen Church. But the longer period for deliberation gave Carter time to worry about his compatibility with the publicity-seeking Church, who had a tendency to be long-winded. Instead, Carter invited Senators Edmund Muskie, John Glenn and Walter Mondale, and Congressman Peter W. Rodino to visit his home in Plains, Georgia, for personal interviews, while Church, Henry M. Jackson, and Adlai Stevenson III would be interviewed at the convention in New York. Rodino revealed he had no interest in the position, and of all the other potential candidates, Carter found Mondale the most compatible. As a result, Carter selected Mondale as his running mate.

African American leadership within the Democratic Party had sought to potentially place Los Angeles Mayor Tom Bradley, Congressman Ron Dellums, or Congresswoman Barbara Jordan on the ticket with Carter. However, Jordan took herself out of consideration, and Carter did not have any interest in the other candidates put forward.

The vice presidential tally, in part, was:

- Walter Mondale 2837
- House Speaker Carl Albert 36
- Ronald Dellums 20
- Fritz Efaw 12
- Barbara Jordan 17
- Others 53

== See also ==
- 1976 Republican Party presidential primaries
- Endorsements in the 1976 Democratic presidential primaries
