= John J. Rooney (politician) =

American politician (1903–1975)

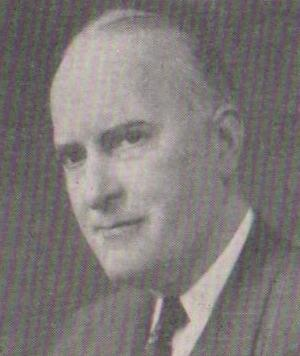

Member of the U.S. House of Representatives from New York
- In office June 6, 1944 – December 31, 1974
- Preceded by: Thomas H. Cullen
- Succeeded by: Frederick W. Richmond
- Constituency: 4th district (1944–45); 12th district (1945–53); 14th district (1953–74)

Personal details
- Born: John James Rooney; November 29, 1903 Brooklyn, New York, U.S.
- Died: October 26, 1975 (aged 71) Washington, D.C., U.S.
- Resting place: Holy Cross Cemetery, Brooklyn, N.Y.
- Party: Democratic
- Spouse(s): Catherine Kramm (m. 1953; his death, 1975)
- Children: 3
- Education: Fordham University (JD)

John James Rooney (November 29, 1903 – October 26, 1975) was an American lawyer and a Democratic politician from New York. From 1944 to 1974, he served in the U.S. House of Representatives.

== Early life ==
Rooney was born in Brooklyn in 1903. In 1925, he graduated with a J.D. degree from Fordham University School of Law and practiced law following his admission to the bar the next year. He subsequently served as assistant district attorney in Brooklyn, New York, from 1940 to 1944.

== Political career ==
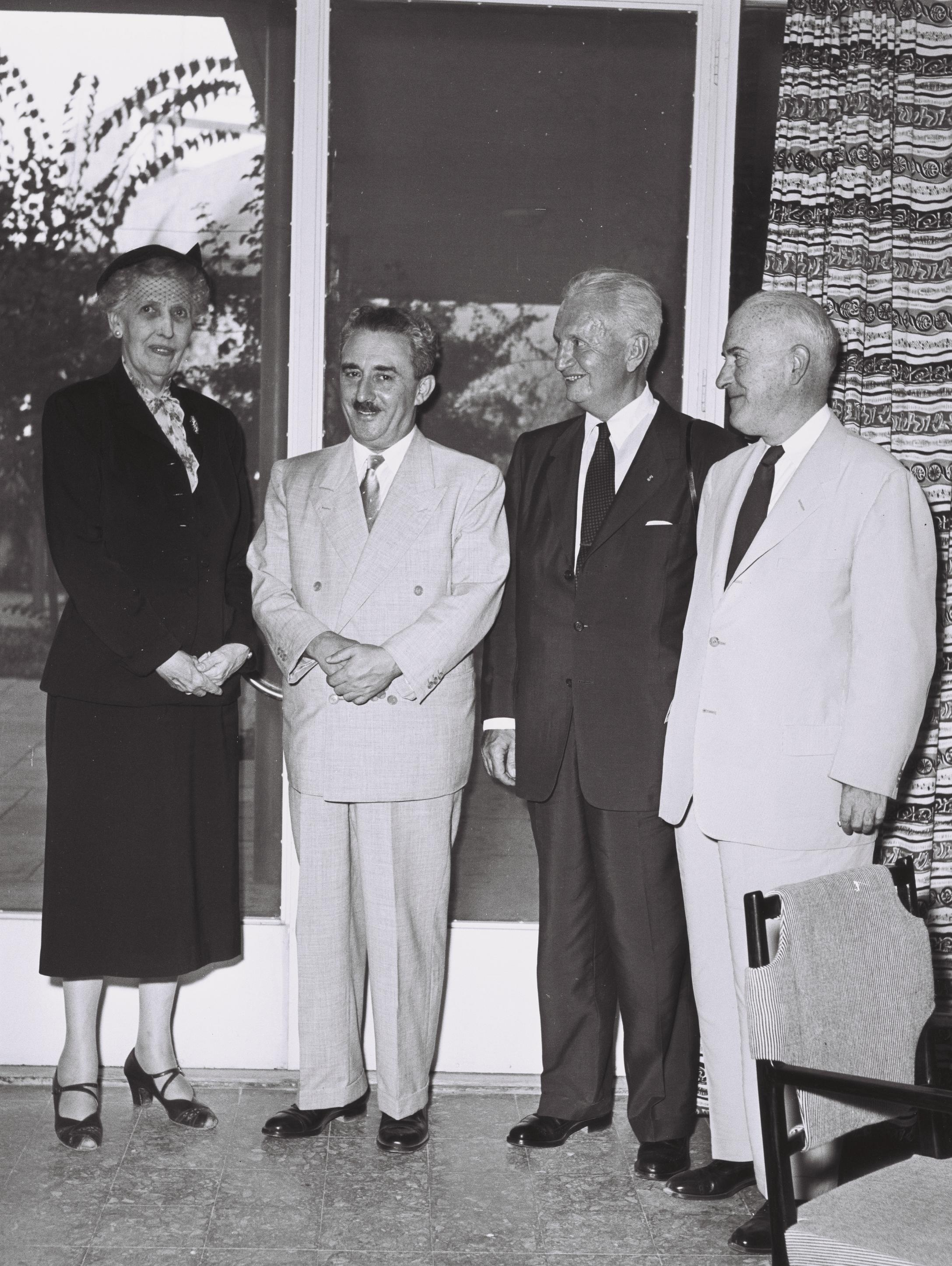
Moshe Sharett (second from left), Israel's Foreign Minister, with Congress members: Ruth Thompson, Francis Walter, and John J. Rooney (1955).

In 1944, Rooney was elected by special election to the 78th United States Congress, to fill the vacancy left after the death of Thomas H. Cullen. He was re-elected in each subsequent election until opting to retire after the 1974 midterm election. He resigned from his seat on December 31, 1974, a few days before his term was to expire.

He was once called a "frank torchbearer for the so-called Catholic lobby," for his support of American aid to Francisco Franco's regime in Spain.

== Death ==
Rooney died on October 26, 1975, in Washington, D.C.

U.S. House of Representatives
Preceded by Thomas H. Cullen	Member of the U.S. House of Representatives from New York's 4th congressional district 1944–1945	Succeeded by William B. Barry
Preceded by Samuel Dickstein	Member of the U.S. House of Representatives from New York's 12th congressional district 1945–1953	Succeeded by Francis E. Dorn
Preceded by Abraham J. Multer	Member of the U.S. House of Representatives from New York's 14th congressional district 1953–1974	Succeeded by Frederick W. Richmond
