= 1976 Arkansas Democratic Party presidential primary =

May 25, 1976	1980 →

Candidate	Jimmy Carter	George Wallace
Home state	Georgia	Alabama
Delegate count	17	5
Popular vote	314,277	83,005
Percentage	62.6%	16.5%
Candidate	Uncommitted	Mo Udall
Home state	—	Arizona
Delegate count	3	1
Popular vote	57,145	37,783
Percentage	11.4%	7.5%
County results
Carter
50 – 60%
60 – 70%
70 – 80%

The 1976 Arkansas Democratic Party presidential primary was held on May 25 as part of the 1976 Democratic Party presidential primaries to elect 26 delegates to the 1976 Democratic National Convention. It was the first Democratic presidential primary held in the state of Arkansas. Governor of Georgia Jimmy Carter handily won the contest by 46 points.

== Results ==
1976 Arkansas Democratic Party presidential primary
Candidate	Del	Votes	%
Jimmy Carter	17	314,277	62.6%
George Wallace	5	83,005	16.5%
Uncommitted delegates	3	57,145	11.4%
Mo Udall	1	37,783	7.5%
Henry M. Jackson	0	9,554	1.9%

== See also ==
- 1976 Democratic Party presidential primaries
