= Fred Richmond =

American politician (1923–2019)

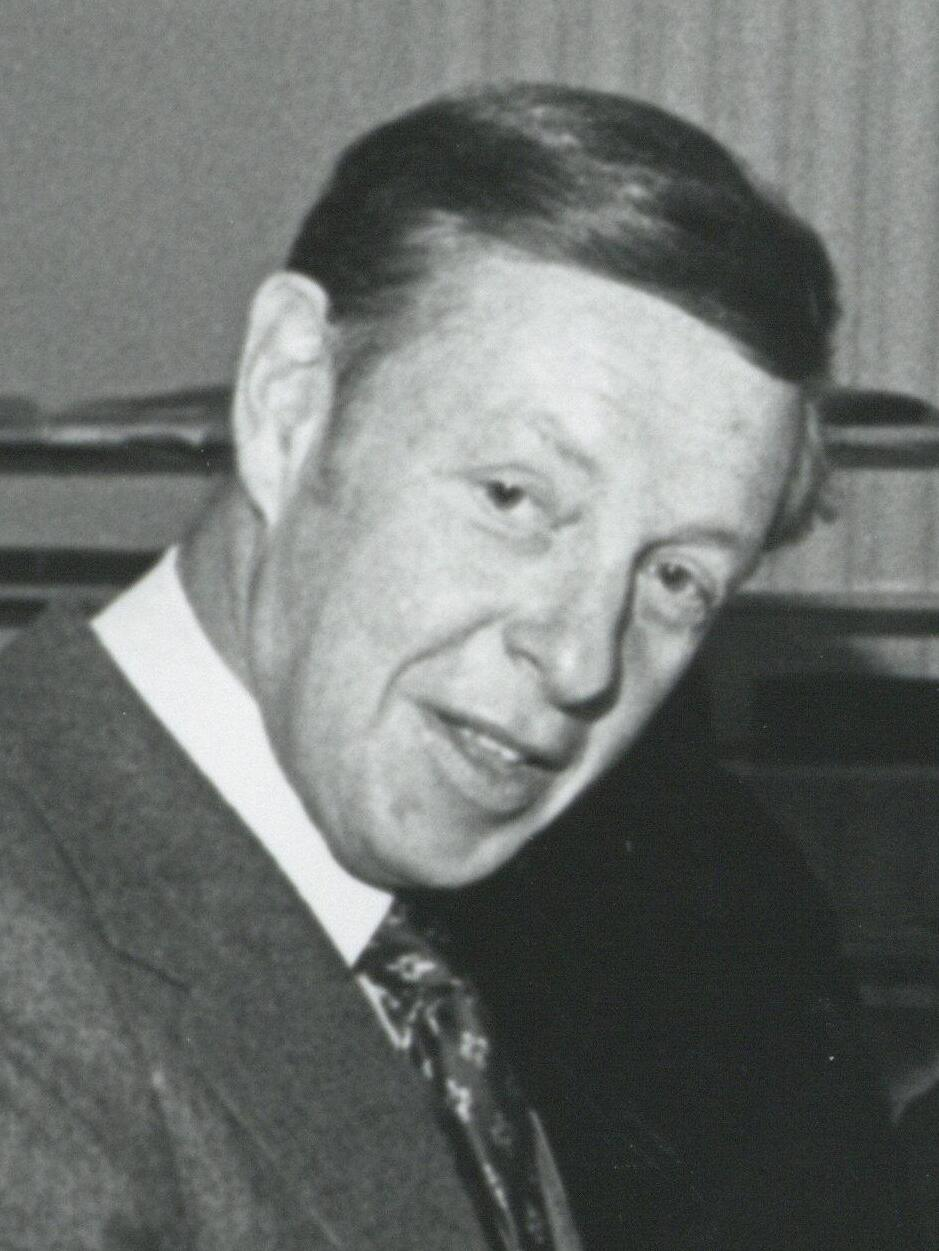
- Richmond in 1975

Member of the U.S. House of Representatives from New York's 14th district
- In office January 3, 1975 – August 25, 1982
- Preceded by: John J. Rooney
- Succeeded by: Guy Molinari

Personal details
- Born: Frederick William Richmond; November 15, 1923 Boston, Massachusetts, U.S.
- Died: December 28, 2019 (aged 96) New York City, New York, U.S.
- Party: Democratic
- Spouse: Monique Pflieger (m. 1955; div. 1957)
- Children: 1
- Education: Boston University (BA); Harvard University

Frederick William "Fred" Richmond (November 15, 1923 – December 28, 2019) was an American politician from New York who served as a Democratic member of the United States House of Representatives from 1975 to 1982.

== Early life ==
Richmond was born in the Massachusetts city of Boston to Frances (née Rosen) and George Richmond; his father was a lawyer and his mother a homemaker. He graduated from Roxbury Memorial High School in 1940 and enrolled at Boston University for a year before transferring to Harvard University, where he majored in history and served as advertising manager of The Harvard Lampoon. During World War II, he served in the United States Navy from 1943 to 1945 as a petty officer third class (with the rating of radioman) before returning to Boston University, where he received his undergraduate degree in 1946. In college, he supported himself by playing the piano and forming the Freddie Richmond Swing Band.

== Politics ==
He served as deputy finance chairman of the Democratic National Committee from 1958 until 1960 and was a delegate to the 1964 Democratic National Convention. He was also member of the New York City Council from 1973 until 1974 when he was elected to the US Congress in 1974 and represented New York's 14th congressional district from January 3, 1975, until August 25, 1982.

Upon his election, Richmond joined the House Agriculture Committee where he spent many years to develop new support for federally funded inner city gardens which he hoped would spread across the nation. Due to his work, and with help from House veterans in Congress like Jamie Whitten, the Urban Gardening Program (UGP) was created.

== Business ==
From the 1950s to the 1980s he built a conglomerate, incorporated in 1960 as Walco National, buying up and usually improving the operations of a diverse group of smaller operating companies. His business career was not without notoriety. Richmond was also known as an opportunist who skirted ethics. In one instance, he was accused of involvement in greenmail, the purchase of strategic blocks of shares for resale back to a target for a profit.

== Personal life ==
In April 1978, Richmond was arrested in Washington for soliciting sex from a 16-year-old boy.

In 1982, Richmond was convicted on federal corruption charges, which included possession of marijuana and payment of an illegal gratuity to a Brooklyn Navy Yard employee. He resigned his seat and was found guilty of making illegal payments to a government employee and marijuana possession. He was sentenced to a year and a day in federal prison and fined $20,000. He served nine months in prison.

With a personal fortune estimated at $34 million, Richmond was one of the wealthiest members of Congress.

Richmond died on December 28, 2019, at a nursing home in Manhattan from pneumonia, aged 96.

== See also ==
- List of American federal politicians convicted of crimes
- List of federal political scandals in the United States
- List of federal political sex scandals in the United States
- List of Jewish members of the United States Congress

Political offices
Preceded by Leonard Scholnick	Member of the New York City Council from the 18th district 1973	Succeeded by Morton Povman
Preceded by Mario Merola	Member of the New York City Council from the 29th district 1974	Succeeded by Abraham Gerges
U.S. House of Representatives
Preceded by John J. Rooney	Member of the U.S. House of Representatives from New York's 14th congressional district 1975–1982	Succeeded by Guy Molinari
