= Gloria Seldin =

American politician

Gloria Seldin was an aid worker and state legislator. She was a Democrat.

In November 1996 she was one of the all female legislators elected from Concord along with Carol Burney, Jean Wallin, Mary Stuart Gile, Liz Hager, Carol Moore, Toni Crosby, Marilyn Fraser, Katherine Rogers, Tara Reardon, Miriam Dunn, Mary Jane Wallner, Betty Hoadley and state senator Sylvia Larsen. In 1998, Dave Poulin, a male, was elected from Concord.
