= Francis C. Lapointe =

American politician (1939–2025)

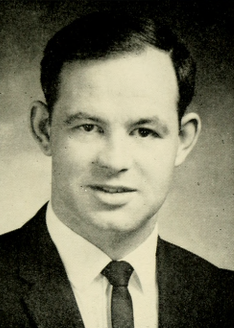

Member of the Massachusetts House of Representatives
- In office 1969–1979

Personal details
- Born: 1939 Holyoke, Massachusetts, U.S.
- Died: January 20, 2025 (aged 86) Chicopee, Massachusetts, U.S.
- Party: Democratic
- Spouse: Adele Ruel (m. 1964)
- Children: 2
- Parents: Francis J. Lapointe (father); Edna Vandal (mother)

Francis C. Lapointe (1939 – January 20, 2025) was an American politician from the state of Massachusetts. He served as a Democratic member of the Massachusetts House of Representatives from 1969 to 1979.

Lapointe was born in 1939 in Holyoke, Massachusetts, the son of Francis J. and Edna Vandal Lapointe, and was raised in Chicopee, Massachusetts, which he would call home for the rest of his life. He attended Westfield State University, earning a bachelor's degree in 1962 and a master's degree in 1964. He married Adele Ruel in 1964, and they would have two children. He earned a second master's degree from Suffolk University in 1980.

After several years as a high school teacher, he was elected to the Massachusetts House of Representatives in 1968, and served from 1969 to 1979. In that time, he rose to become assistant majority leader, and chaired the committee on Election Laws and a special commission on the needs of the handicapped. His legislative accomplishments included securing millions of dollars to renovate the Massachusetts State House and make it more handicapped-accessible, and working to establish the state Office of Campaign and Political Finance. He helped enact the state's first campaign contribution limits and changed Massachusetts from a closed primary state to a semi-closed primary state, allowing unaffiliated voters to vote in partisan primaries. In 1971, he challenged incumbent Chicopee mayor Edward J. Ziemba, but lost in the general election. Lapointe did not seek re-election in 1978, avoiding a showdown with a fellow incumbent due to newly redrawn districts.

He became an expert on redistricting, and would consult on the issue for over thirty years. He was a delegate to the 1988 Democratic National Convention, where Massachusetts governor Michael Dukakis was nominated. Lapointe worked as an assistant state secretary of state, and administered several social service agencies for Western Massachusetts. He died on January 20, 2025, at the age of 86.
