= Abraham G. Gerges =

American politician

Member of the New York City Council from the 29th district
- In office January 1, 1975 – December 31, 1990
- Preceded by: Fred Richmond
- Succeeded by: Kenneth K. Fisher

Personal details
- Born: March 20, 1934 (age 91); Brooklyn, New York City, New York
- Political party: Democratic

Abraham G. Gerges (born March 20, 1934) is an American politician who served in the New York City Council from the 29th district from 1975 to 1990.
