= Political positions of Jimmy Carter =

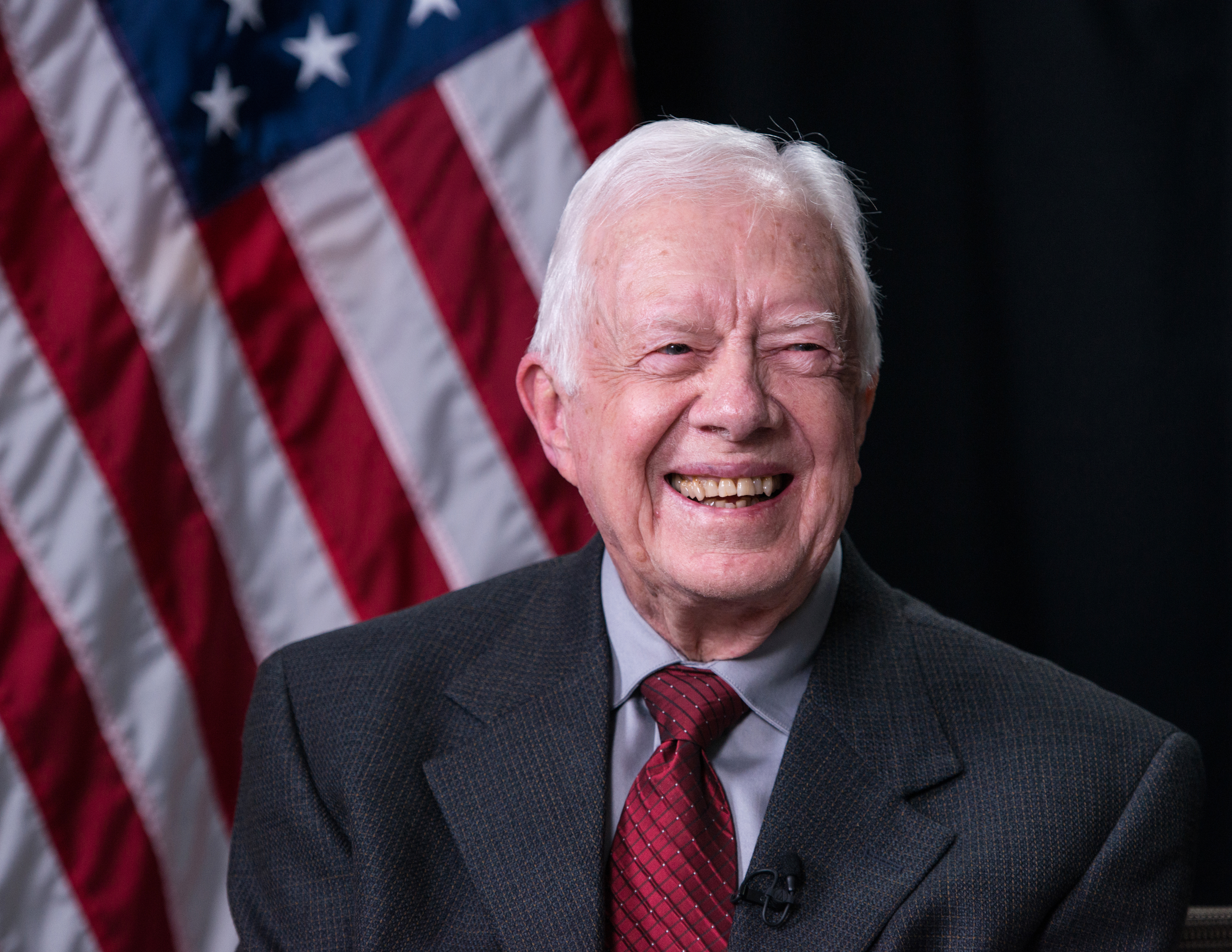
Carter during the LBJ Presidential Library Civil Rights Summit in 2014

Jimmy Carter was the 39th president of the United States from 1977 to 1981. Below is a list of his political positions, some of which he expressed during his presidency and others during his post-presidency.

== Abortion ==
Although Carter was personally opposed to abortion, he supported legalized abortion after the landmark U.S. Supreme Court decision Roe v. Wade, 410 US 113 (1973). Early in his term as governor, Carter had strongly supported family planning programs including abortion to save the life of a woman, birth defects, or in other extreme circumstances. Years later, he had written the foreword to a book, Women in Need, that favored a woman's right to abortion. He had given private encouragement to the plaintiffs in a lawsuit, Doe v. Bolton, filed against the state of Georgia to overturn its abortion laws. As president, he did not support increased federal funding for abortion services. He was criticized by the American Civil Liberties Union for not doing enough to find alternatives.

In a March 29, 2012, interview with Laura Ingraham, Carter expressed his wish to see the Democratic Party becoming more anti-abortion, allowing it only in the case of rape, incest or risk of maternal death. He signed a letter from Democrats for Life of America calling for greater acceptance of pro-Life views in the Democratic party.

== Death penalty ==
Carter was known for his strong opposition to the death penalty, which he expressed during his presidential campaigns. In his Nobel Prize lecture, Carter urged "prohibition of the death penalty". He has continued to speak out against the death penalty in the U.S. and abroad. In a letter to the governor of New Mexico, Bill Richardson, Carter urged the governor to sign a bill to eliminate the death penalty and institute life in prison without parole instead. New Mexico abolished the death penalty in 2009. Carter wrote: "As you know, the United States is one of the few countries, along with nations such as Saudi Arabia, China, and Cuba, which still carry out the death penalty despite the ongoing tragedy of wrongful conviction and gross racial and class-based disparities that make impossible the fair implementation of this ultimate punishment." In 2012, Carter wrote an op-ed in the Los Angeles Times supporting passage of a state referendum which would have ended the death penalty. Carter has also called for commutations of death sentences for many death-row inmates, including Brian K. Baldwin (executed in 1999), Kenneth Foster (commuted in 2007) and Troy Davis (executed in 2011).

== Baptist women pastors ==
In October 2000, Carter, a third-generation Southern Baptist, severed connections to the Southern Baptist Convention over its opposition to women as pastors. Carter took this action due to a doctrinal statement by the convention, adopted in June 2000, advocating for a literal interpretation of the Bible. This statement followed a position of the convention two years previously advocating the submission of wives to their husbands. Carter described the reason for his decision as due to: "an increasing inclination on the part of Southern Baptist Convention leaders to be more rigid on what is a Southern Baptist and exclusionary of accommodating those who differ from them." The New York Times called Carter's action "the highest-profile defection yet from the Southern Baptist Convention".

On July 15, 2009, Carter wrote an opinion piece about equality for women in which he stated that he chooses equality for women over the dictates of the leadership of what has been a lifetime religious commitment. He said that the view that women are inferior is not confined to one faith, "nor, tragically does its influence stop at the walls of the church, mosque, synagogue or temple." In 2014, he published A Call to Action: Women, Religion, Violence, and Power.

== Gun control ==
Carter had publicly expressed support for both a ban on assault weapons and for background checks of gun buyers. In May 1994, Carter and former presidents Gerald Ford and Ronald Reagan wrote to the U.S. House of Representatives in support of banning "semi-automatic assault guns." In a February 2013 appearance on Piers Morgan Tonight, Carter agreed that if the assault weapons ban did not pass, it would be mainly due to lobbying by the National Rifle Association and its pressure on "weak-kneed" politicians.

== Same-sex marriage ==
Carter had stated that he supported same-sex marriage in civil ceremonies. He said: "I believe Jesus would. I don't have any verse in scripture ... I believe Jesus would approve gay marriage, but that's just my own personal belief. I think Jesus would encourage any love affair if it was honest and sincere and was not damaging to anyone else, and I don't see that gay marriage damages anyone else". Evangelist Franklin Graham criticized the assertion as "absolutely wrong". In October 2014, Carter argued ahead of a Supreme Court ruling that legalization of same-sex marriage should be left up to the states and not mandated by federal law.

== Race ==
Carter ignited debate in September 2009 when he stated: "I think an overwhelming portion of the intensely demonstrated animosity toward President Barack Obama is based on the fact that he is a black man, that he is African-American". Obama disagreed with Carter's assessment. On CNN, Obama stated, "Are there people out there who don't like me because of race? I'm sure there are... that's not the overriding issue here".

== Torture ==
In 2005, Carter criticized the use of torture at Guantánamo Bay, demanding that it be closed. He stated that the next president should make the promise that the United States will "never again torture a prisoner."

== Health care ==
In 2013, Carter praised the Affordable Care Act (the major health care reform law put forward by President Obama), but criticized its implementation as "questionable at best". In 2017, Carter predicted that the U.S. would eventually adopt a single-payer healthcare system.

== Campaign finance reform ==
Carter vigorously opposed the Supreme Court decision in Citizens United v. FEC that struck down limits on campaign spending by corporations and unions. Carter said the U.S. now has a system of "unlimited political bribery".

== Kamala Harris ==
Carter's family members had stated that he wanted to live long enough to vote for Kamala Harris, a candidate to 2024 presidential elections. He did so and stated that he "had fulfilled his end-of-life goal".
