= Jean Rogers Wallin =

Politician and official in New Hampshire

Jean Rogers Wallin is a politician and public official in New Hampshire. She served in the New Hampshire House of Representatives. She was a Democrat.

She was friends with Gloria Seldin. She lived in Nashua, New Hampshire.

She was appointed Chair of the New Hampshire State Liquor Commission in 1980. She donated a decanter commemorating the construction of the Sherman Adams Building on the summit of Mt. Washington to the New Hampshire Historical Society.
