= Peter C. McCarthy =

American politician (1941–2021)

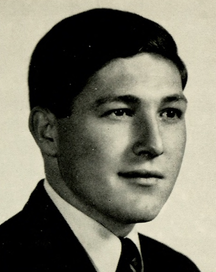
- 1975 Peter McCarthy Massachusetts House of Representatives

Member of the Massachusetts House of Representatives for the 5th Essex District
- In office 1969–1979
- Preceded by: Jerome A. Segal
- Succeeded by: District eliminated

Peabody School Committee
- In office 1965–1969

Personal details
- Born: September 8, 1941 Peabody, Massachusetts
- Died: September 16, 2021 (aged 80) Boston
- Party: Democratic
- Education: Suffolk University; Boston University
- Occupation: Teacher; State representative; Government official; Lobbyist

Peter Charles McCarthy (September 8, 1941 – September 16, 2021) was an American politician who served in the Massachusetts House of Representatives from 1969 to 1979.

== Early life ==
McCarthy was born on September 8, 1941, in Peabody, Massachusetts. He attended Peabody Public Schools and graduated from Peabody High School in 1960. He served in the United States Marine Corps and received an honorable discharge. He earned a bachelor's degree from Suffolk University in 1964 and taught history at Essex Agricultural and Technical High School for 16 years. He later earned a master's degree from Boston University.

== Politics ==
McCarthy was a member of the Peabody School Committee from 1965 to 1969. From 1969 to 1979 he represented the 5th Essex District in the Massachusetts House of Representatives. He lost seat to redistricting in 1978 and ran for the state senate instead. He lost the Democratic nomination for the Second Essex district seat to John G. King. He became governor Edward J. King's legislative secretary at the end of his term. From 1980 to 1985 he was assistant commissioner of Social Services. He then served as director of federal and state relations for the Executive Office of Human Services until 2001.

== Later life ==
After leaving government service, McCarthy ran a lobbying firm with Timothy A. Bassett. He served as a government relations consultant for the New England Center and Home for Veterans from 2001 to 2016. In 2002 he was a candidate for state representative in the 12th Essex district, but lost the Democratic nomination to Joyce Spiliotis. In 2005 he was named superintendent of the Essex Agricultural and Technical High School, but his appointment was rejected by the state commissioner of education, who ruled that McCarthy did not meet the licensure requirements for a vocational-technical superintendent. McCarthy died on September 16, 2021, at Massachusetts General Hospital.
