= Ira E. Rider =

American politician (1868–1906)

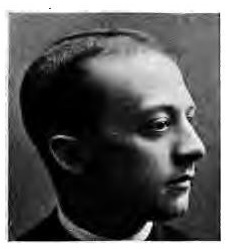

Member of the U.S. House of Representatives from New York's 14th district
- In office March 4, 1903 – March 3, 1905
- Preceded by: William H. Douglas
- Succeeded by: Charles A. Towne

Personal details
- Born: Ira Edgar Rider; November 17, 1868 Jersey City, New Jersey, U.S.
- Died: May 29, 1906 (aged 37) New York City, U.S.
- Resting place: Calvary Cemetery
- Party: Democratic
- Education: St. Lawrence University
- Profession: Attorney

Ira Edgar Rider (November 17, 1868 – May 29, 1906) was an American lawyer and politician who served one term as a U.S. representative from New York from 1903 to 1905.

== Biography ==
Born in Jersey City, New Jersey, Rider attended the public schools and the College of the City of New York. He graduated from St. Lawrence University in Canton, New York. Rider studied law, was admitted to the bar and commenced practice in New York City. From 1898 to 1902, he served as secretary to Manhattan's borough president.

=== Congress ===
Rider was elected as a Democrat to the Fifty-eighth Congress (March 4, 1903 – March 3, 1905). Owing to ill health, he was not a candidate for renomination in 1904.

=== Later career and death ===
He resumed the practice of law and died in New York City, May 29, 1906. He was interred in Calvary Cemetery, Woodside, Queens, New York.

== Electoral history ==
1902 election: District 14
Party	Candidate	Votes	%
Democratic	Ira E. Rider	20,402	63.7%
Republican	Andrew J. Anderson	8,492	26.5%
Social Democratic	William Ehret	2,348	7.3%
Socialist Labor	Arthur Chambers	647	2.0%
Liberty Bell Democratic	John J. M. Issing	79	0.2%
Prohibition	John C. Wallace	79	0.2%
Total votes		32,047	100%

== Sources ==
- United States Congress. "Ira E. Rider (id: R000242)". Biographical Directory of the United States Congress.

U.S. House of Representatives
Preceded by William H. Douglas	Member of the U.S. House of Representatives from New York's 14th congressional district 1903–1905	Succeeded by Charles A. Towne
