= Sol Ullman =

American politician

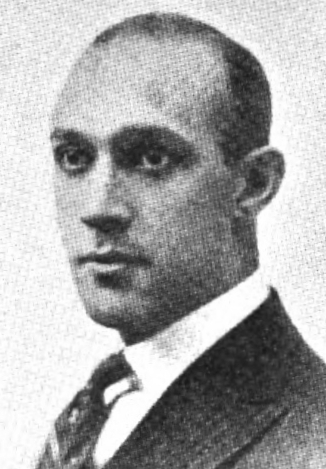
- Ullman c. 1923

Member of the New York State Assembly from the 6th New York district
- In office January 1, 1919 – December 31, 1923
- Preceded by: Elmer Rosenberg
- Succeeded by: Morris Weinfeld

Personal details
- Born: Solomon Ullman; 1893 New York City, U.S.
- Died: July 6, 1941 (aged 47–48) New York City, U.S.
- Resting place: Union Field Cemetery; Cypress Hills, Brooklyn
- Party: Republican
- Other political affiliations: Democratic
- Spouse: Estelle Ruth Blau (m. 1916)
- Children: 3
- Parent(s): Samuel and Kate Ullman
- Education: New York Law School
- Occupation: Lawyer, politician
- Organization(s): Freemasons, Modern Woodmen of America
- Board member of: New York City Bar Association, New York County Lawyers' Association, New York State Bar Association, American Bar Association
- Criminal information
- Status: 1921 Indictment: Conspiracy charge dismissed; acquitted on the other two; 1939 Indictment: Charges dismissed
- Criminal charges: 1921 Indictment: Conspiracy against the United States; Extortion; Bribery; 1939 Indictment: Bribery; Criminal conspiracy
- Accomplices: Emanuel Friedman; Justus Frankel; Meyer Saal; Harry Levy

Solomon Ullman (c. 1893 – July 6, 1941) was a Jewish-American lawyer and politician from New York.

== Life ==
Ullman was born around 1893 in Manhattan, New York, the son of Samuel and Kate Ullman.

Ullman attended Townsend Harris High School and graduated from New York Law School in 1912. He was admitted to the bar in 1913 and began practicing law in 51 Chambers Street. In 1918, he was elected to the New York State Assembly over Socialist Elmer Rosenberg, representing the New York County 6th District. He was a Republican, but ran as a Democrat as well as a Republican. He served in the Assembly in 1919, 1920, 1921, 1922, and 1923. He lost the 1923 re-election to Democrat Morris Weinfeld. He wrote a number of important bills in the Assembly, including the Home Rule Amendment and the Repeal the Lusk Laws.

In July 1921, while serving on the joint legislative graft committee, Ullman was arrested with his law partner Emanuel Friedman, public accountants Justus Frankel and Meyer Saal, and internal revenue agent Harry Levy on a charge of a conspiracy to defraud the government by filing a false income tax return to the Treasury Department. He and the other four men were indicted by a Federal grand jury later that month. Their trial began in September 1921, with the five men facing charges of defrauding the government out of income and profit taxes, extorting 6,500 dollars from a business house, and bribing an official to file a false report. The charge of conspiring to defraud the government was dismissed against all the defendants, and Ullman and Friedman were acquitted of the other two charges.

Ullman was assistant attorney general, assigned to the State Department of Education, from 1925 to 1939. He was also counsel to the Medical Grievance Committee of the State of New York. In the 1928 United States House of Representatives election, he was the Republican candidate in New York's 14th congressional district. He lost the election to Democrat William I. Sirovich. He was also an alternate delegate to the 1928 Republican National Convention.

Ullman resigned as assistant attorney general in February 1939. In March 1939, he was indicted on charges of bribery and accepting 13,000 dollars in unlawful fees in a conspiracy with others to protect a Brooklyn physician connected with an alleged abortion racket that handled around 100,000 illegal abortions a year in the borough. He faced automatic disbarment if convicted. The indictment was dismissed by New York Supreme Court Justice John MacCrate in May 1940, after which Assistant Attorney General John Amen filed disbarment charges against Ullman. He was exonerated of charges.

Ullman was a member of the New York City Bar Association, the New York County Lawyers' Association, the New York State Bar Association, the American Bar Association, the Freemasons, and the Modern Woodmen of America. In 1916, he married Estelle Ruth Blau. Their children were Gerald Howard and James.

Ullman died in Lenox Hill Hospital on July 6, 1941. A thousand people attended his funeral in Riverside Memorial Chapel, with 200 people outside the full chapel in the rain. His funeral was attended by General Sessions Judges Jonah J. Goldstein and Saul S. Streit, Special Sessions Judge Frederick L. Hackenburg and Nathan D. Perlman, Minority Leader of the Assembly Irwin Steingut, State Senators Jacob J. Schwartzwald and William J. Murray, Magistrate Raphael P. Koenig and his father former New York County Republican Chairman Samuel S. Koenig, Kings County Democratic leader Frank V. Kelly, chief of the District Attorney's appeals bureau Stanley H. Fuld, State Housing Commissioner Edward Weinfeld, and former assembly Meyer Alterman. He was buried in the family mausoleum in Union Field Cemetery in Cypress Hills.

New York State Assembly
Preceded by Elmer Rosenberg	New York State Assembly; New York County, 6th District; 1919–1923	Succeeded by Morris Weinfeld
