= New York's 14th congressional district =

U.S. House district for New York

- Interactive map of district boundaries since January 3, 2025
- Representative: Alexandria Ocasio-Cortez; D–Queens
- Distribution: 100.00% urban; 0.00% rural
- Population (2025): 731,177
- Median household income: $64,741
- Ethnicity: 52.4% Hispanic; 18.4% White; 13.5% Black; 12.1% Asian; 2.2% Two or more races; 1.5% other
- Cook PVI: D+19

New York's 14th congressional district is a congressional district for the United States House of Representatives located in New York City, represented by Democrat Alexandria Ocasio-Cortez.

The district includes the eastern part of The Bronx and part of north-central Queens. The Queens portion includes the neighborhoods of Astoria, College Point, Corona, East Elmhurst, Elmhurst, Jackson Heights, and Woodside. The Bronx portion of the district includes the neighborhoods of City Island, Country Club, Van Nest, Morris Park, Parkchester, Pelham Bay, Schuylerville, and Throggs Neck. The Bronx section of the district takes in part of the majority-Latino sections of the Bronx, with large Puerto Rican, Mexican, and Dominican populations, while the Queens section of the district includes ethnically diverse neighborhoods with large Chinese, Ecuadorian, Indian, Bangladeshi, and Greek communities. The district has the highest percentages of Ecuadorian Americans, at 9.0%, and Bangladeshi Americans, at 2.3%, out of New York's congressional districts. Roughly half of the population of the district is of Hispanic or Latino heritage, making it one of the more Latino districts in New York. Before redistricting for the 2012 election, much of the area was in New York's 7th congressional district. The district ranks fourth among the state's congressional districts in its poverty rate of 20.7 percent, per a 2026 congressional study.

== Recent election results from statewide races ==
Year	Office	Results
2008	President	Obama 82% - 18%
2012	President	Obama 86% - 14%
2016	President	Clinton 81% - 16%
2016	Senate	Schumer 86% - 11%
2018	Senate	Gillibrand 87% - 13%
2018	Governor	Cuomo 84% - 13%
2018	Attorney General	James 85% - 13%
2020	President	Biden 77% - 22%
2022	Senate	Schumer 73% - 27%
2022	Governor	Hochul 69% - 31%
2022	Attorney General	James 71% - 29%
2022	Comptroller	DiNapoli 71% - 29%
2024	President	Harris 65% - 33%
2024	Senate	Gillibrand 69% - 30%

== History ==
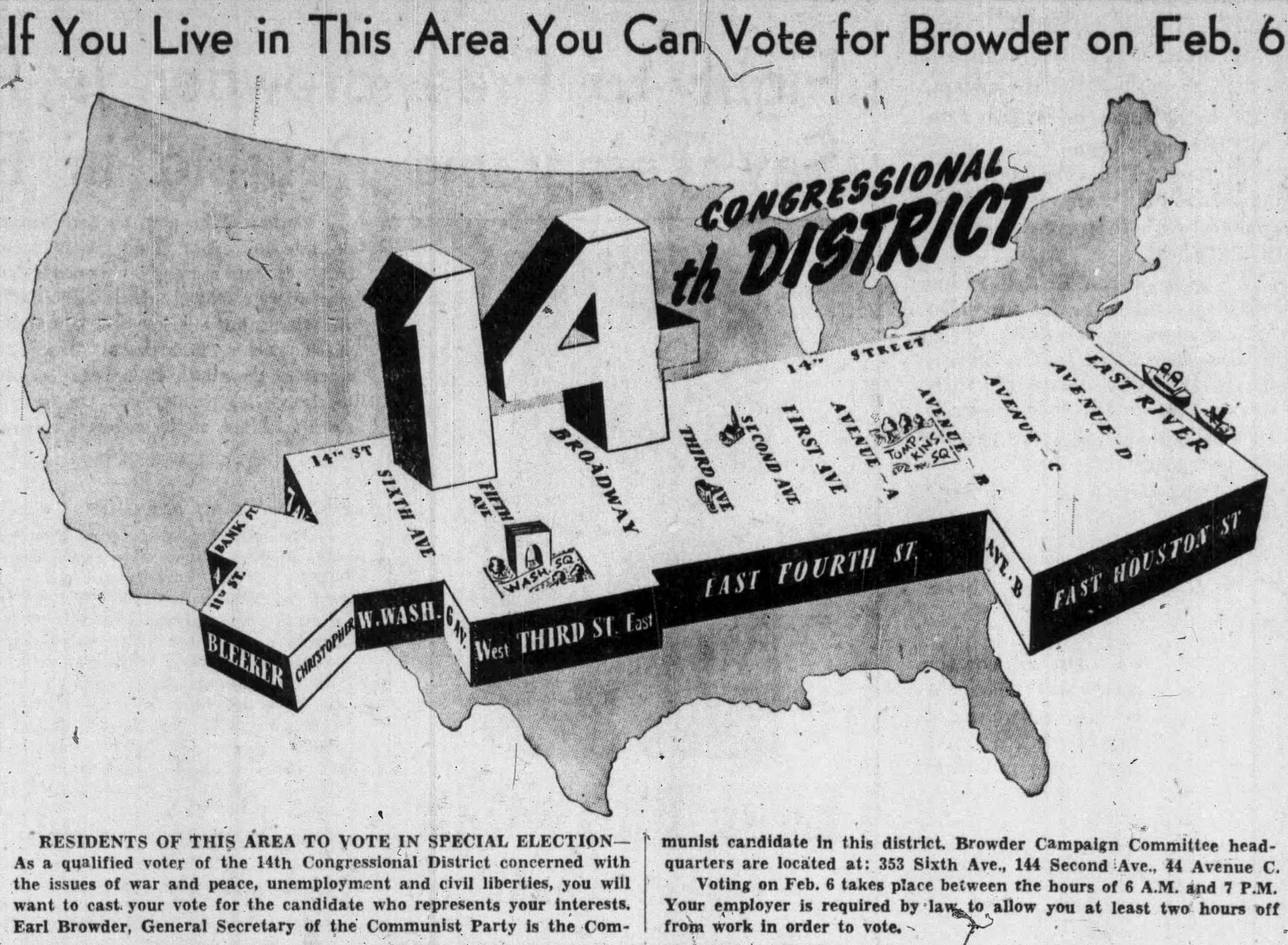
A map of the district published in the Daily Worker, January 27, 1940

- 1803–1813: [data missing]
- 1813–1823: Montgomery County
- 1823–1913: [data missing]
- 1913–1945: Parts of Manhattan
- 1945–1983: Parts of Brooklyn
- 1983–1993: All of Staten Island, Parts of Brooklyn
- 1993–2003: Parts of Brooklyn, Manhattan, Queens
- 2003–2013: Parts of Manhattan, Queens
- 2013–present: Parts of Queens, The Bronx

During the 1970s, this area was the 18th district; in the 1980s it was the 15th district. The district was a Brooklyn-based seat until 1982 when it became the Staten Island district. In 1992 it became the East Side of Manhattan district, which for most of its existence had been the 17th district. In 2012, the district shifted to the former territory of the 7th district in Queens and the Bronx. From 2003 to 2013, the district encompassed much of what is now New York's 12th congressional district, including Central Park and the East Side of Manhattan; all of Roosevelt Island; and the neighborhoods of Astoria, Long Island City, and Sunnyside in Queens.

== Current composition ==
The 14th district is located entirely in the New York City boroughs of The Bronx and Queens.

Bronx neighborhoods in the district include:

- Bronx River
- Castle Hill
- City Island
- Clason Point
- Co-op City
- Country Club
- Crotona Park East
- Hunts Point
- Longwood
- Morris Park
- Parkchester
- Pelham Bay
- Schuylerville
- Soundview
- Throggs Neck
- Westchester Square

Queens neighborhoods in the district include:

- Astoria
- College Point
- Corona
- Ditmars
- East Elmhurst
- North Corona
- Northern Woodside

== List of members representing the district ==
Member	Party	Years	Cong ress	Electoral history	Location
District established March 4, 1803
Erastus Root (Delhi)	Democratic-Republican	March 4, 1803 – March 3, 1805	8th	Elected in 1802. Retired.	1803–1809; Delaware and Otsego.
John Russell (Cooperstown)	Democratic-Republican	March 4, 1805 – March 3, 1809	9th 10th	Elected in 1804. Re-elected in 1806. Retired.	1803–1809; Delaware and Otsego.
Vincent Mathews (Elmira)	Federalist	March 4, 1809 – March 3, 1811	11th	Elected in 1808. Retired.	1809–1813; Tioga, Steuben, Cayuga and Seneca.
Daniel Avery (Aurora)	Democratic-Republican	March 4, 1811 – March 3, 1813	12th	Re-elected in 1810. Redistricted to the 20th district.	1809–1813; Tioga, Steuben, Cayuga and Seneca.
Jacob Markell (Manheim)	Federalist	March 4, 1813 – March 3, 1815	13th	Elected in 1812. Retired.	1813–1819; Montgomery
Daniel Cady (Johnstown)	Federalist	March 4, 1815 – March 3, 1817	14th	Elected in 1814. Retired.	1813–1819; Montgomery
John Herkimer (Danube)	Democratic-Republican	March 4, 1817 – March 3, 1819	15th	Elected in 1816. Redistricted to the 15th district.	1813–1819; Montgomery
John Fay (Northampton)	Democratic-Republican	March 4, 1819 – March 3, 1821	16th	Elected in 1818. Retired.	1819–1823; Montgomery County and the Town of Danube in Herkimer County.
Vacant		March 4, 1821 – December 3, 1821	17th	Elections were held in April 1821. It is unclear when results were announced or credentials issued.	1819–1823; Montgomery County and the Town of Danube in Herkimer County.
Alfred Conkling (Canajoharie)	Democratic-Republican	December 3, 1821 – March 3, 1823	17th	Elected in 1821. Retired.	1819–1823; Montgomery County and the Town of Danube in Herkimer County.
Henry R. Storrs (Whitestown)	Democratic-Republican	March 4, 1823 – March 3, 1825	18th 19th 20th 21st	Elected in 1822. Re-elected in 1824. Re-elected in 1826. Re-elected in 1828. Retired.	1823–1833; Oneida
Henry R. Storrs (Whitestown)	Anti-Jacksonian	March 4, 1825 – March 3, 1831	18th 19th 20th 21st	Elected in 1822. Re-elected in 1824. Re-elected in 1826. Re-elected in 1828. Retired.	1823–1833; Oneida
Samuel Beardsley (Utica)	Jacksonian	March 4, 1831 – March 3, 1833	22nd	Elected in 1830. Redistricted to the 17th district.	1823–1833; Oneida
Ransom H. Gillet (Ogdensburg)	Jacksonian	March 4, 1833 – March 3, 1837	23rd 24th	Elected in 1832. Re-elected in 1834. Retired.	1833–1843 [data missing]
James B. Spencer (Fort Covington)	Democratic	March 4, 1837 – March 3, 1839	25th	Elected in 1836. Retired.	1833–1843 [data missing]
John Fine (Ogdensburg)	Democratic	March 4, 1839 – March 3, 1841	26th	Elected in 1838. Retired.	1833–1843 [data missing]
Henry Bell Van Rensselaer (Ogdensburg)	Whig	March 4, 1841 – March 3, 1843	27th	Elected in 1840. Retired.	1833–1843 [data missing]
Charles Rogers (Sandy Hill)	Whig	March 4, 1843 – March 3, 1845	28th	Elected in 1842. Retired.	1843–1853 [data missing]
Erastus D. Culver (Greenwich)	Whig	March 4, 1845 – March 3, 1847	29th	Elected in 1844. Retired.	1843–1853 [data missing]
Orlando Kellogg (Elizabethtown)	Whig	March 4, 1847 – March 3, 1849	30th	Elected in 1846. Retired.	1843–1853 [data missing]
George R. Andrews (Ticonderoga)	Whig	March 4, 1849 – March 3, 1851	31st	Elected in 1848. Retired.	1843–1853 [data missing]
John H. Boyd (Whitehall)	Whig	March 4, 1851 – March 3, 1853	32nd	Elected in 1850. Retired.	1843–1853 [data missing]
Rufus W. Peckham (Albany)	Democratic	March 4, 1853 – March 3, 1855	33rd	Elected in 1852. Retired.	1853–1863 [data missing]
Samuel Dickson (New Scotland)	Opposition	March 4, 1855 – March 3, 1857	34th	Elected in 1854. Retired.	1853–1863 [data missing]
Erastus Corning (Albany)	Democratic	March 4, 1857 – March 3, 1859	35th	Elected in 1856. Retired.	1853–1863 [data missing]
John H. Reynolds (Albany)	Anti-Lecompton Democrat	March 4, 1859 – March 3, 1861	36th	Elected in 1858. Retired.	1853–1863 [data missing]
Erastus Corning (Albany)	Democratic	March 4, 1861 – October 5, 1863	37th 38th	Elected in 1860. Re-elected in 1862. Resigned.	1853–1863 [data missing]
Erastus Corning (Albany)	Democratic	March 4, 1861 – October 5, 1863	37th 38th	Elected in 1860. Re-elected in 1862. Resigned.	1863–1873 [data missing]
Vacant		October 5, 1863 – December 7, 1863	38th		1863–1873 [data missing]
John V. L. Pruyn (Albany)	Democratic	December 7, 1863 – March 3, 1865	38th	Elected to finish Corning's term. Retired.	1863–1873 [data missing]
Charles Goodyear (Schoharie)	Democratic	March 4, 1865 – March 3, 1867	39th	Elected in 1864. Retired.	1863–1873 [data missing]
John V. L. Pruyn (Albany)	Democratic	March 4, 1867 – March 3, 1869	40th	Elected in 1866. Retired.	1863–1873 [data missing]
Stephen L. Mayham (Schoharie)	Democratic	March 4, 1869 – March 3, 1871	41st	Elected in 1868. Retired.	1863–1873 [data missing]
Eli Perry (Albany)	Democratic	March 4, 1871 – March 3, 1873	42nd	Elected in 1870. Redistricted to the 15th district.	1863–1873 [data missing]
David M. De Witt (Kingston)	Democratic	March 4, 1873 – March 3, 1875	43rd	Elected in 1872. Retired.	1873–1883 [data missing]
George M. Beebe (Monticello)	Democratic	March 4, 1875 – March 3, 1879	44th 45th	Elected in 1874. Re-elected in 1876. Lost re-election.	1873–1883 [data missing]
John W. Ferdon (Piermont)	Republican	March 4, 1879 – March 3, 1881	46th	Elected in 1878. Retired.	1873–1883 [data missing]
Lewis Beach (Cornwall)	Democratic	March 4, 1881 – March 3, 1885	47th 48th	Elected in 1880. Re-elected in 1882. Redistricted to the 15th district.	1873–1883 [data missing]
Lewis Beach (Cornwall)	Democratic	March 4, 1881 – March 3, 1885	47th 48th	Elected in 1880. Re-elected in 1882. Redistricted to the 15th district.	1883–1893 [data missing]
William G. Stahlnecker (Yonkers)	Democratic	March 4, 1885 – March 3, 1893	49th 50th 51st 52nd	Elected in 1884. Re-elected in 1886. Re-elected in 1888. Re-elected in 1890. Retired.	1883–1893 [data missing]
John R. Fellows (New York)	Democratic	March 4, 1893 – December 31, 1893	53rd	Redistricted from the 6th district and re-elected in 1892. Resigned to become New York County District Attorney.	1893–1903 [data missing]
Vacant		December 31, 1893 – January 30, 1894	53rd		1893–1903 [data missing]
Lemuel E. Quigg (New York)	Republican	January 30, 1894 – March 3, 1899	53rd 54th 55th	Elected to finish Fellows's term. Re-elected in 1894. Re-elected in 1896. Lost re-election.	1893–1903 [data missing]
William A. Chanler (New York)	Democratic	March 4, 1899 – March 3, 1901	56th	Elected in 1898. Retired.	1893–1903 [data missing]
William H. Douglas (New York)	Republican	March 4, 1901 – March 3, 1903	57th	Elected in 1900. Redistricted to the 15th district.	1893–1903 [data missing]
Ira E. Rider (New York)	Democratic	March 4, 1903 – March 3, 1905	58th	Elected in 1902. Retired.	1903–1913 [data missing]
Charles A. Towne (New York)	Democratic	March 4, 1905 – March 3, 1907	59th	Elected in 1904. Retired.	1903–1913 [data missing]
William Willett Jr. (Queens)	Democratic	March 4, 1907 – March 3, 1911	60th 61st	Re-elected in 1906. Re-elected in 1908. Retired.	1903–1913 [data missing]
John J. Kindred (Queens)	Democratic	March 4, 1911 – March 3, 1913	62nd	Elected in 1910. Retired.	1903–1913 [data missing]
Jefferson M. Levy (New York)	Democratic	March 4, 1913 – March 3, 1915	63rd	Redistricted from the 13th district and re-elected in 1912. [data missing]	1913–1933 [data missing]
Michael F. Farley (New York)	Democratic	March 4, 1915 – March 3, 1917	64th	Elected in 1914. Lost re-election.	1913–1933 [data missing]
Fiorello H. LaGuardia (New York)	Republican	March 4, 1917 – December 31, 1919	65th 66th	Elected in 1916. Re-elected in 1918. Resigned.	1913–1933 [data missing]
Vacant		December 31, 1919 – November 2, 1920	66th		1913–1933 [data missing]
Nathan D. Perlman (New York)	Republican	November 2, 1920 – March 3, 1927	66th 67th 68th 69th	Elected to finish LaGuardia's term. Elected to full term in 1920. Re-elected in 1922. Re-elected in 1924. Lost re-election.	1913–1933 [data missing]
William I. Sirovich (New York)	Democratic	March 4, 1927 – December 17, 1939	70th 71st 72nd 73rd 74th 75th 76th	Elected in 1926. Re-elected in 1928. Re-elected in 1930. Re-elected in 1932. Re-elected in 1934. Re-elected in 1936. Re-elected in 1938. Died.	1913–1933 [data missing]
William I. Sirovich (New York)	Democratic	March 4, 1927 – December 17, 1939	70th 71st 72nd 73rd 74th 75th 76th	Elected in 1926. Re-elected in 1928. Re-elected in 1930. Re-elected in 1932. Re-elected in 1934. Re-elected in 1936. Re-elected in 1938. Died.	1933–1943 [data missing]
Vacant		December 17, 1939 – February 6, 1940	76th		1933–1943 [data missing]
Morris Michael Edelstein (New York)	Democratic	February 6, 1940 – June 4, 1941	76th 77th	Elected to finish Sirovich's term. Re-elected later in 1940. Died.	1933–1943 [data missing]
Vacant		June 4, 1941 – July 29, 1941	77th		1933–1943 [data missing]
Arthur G. Klein (New York)	Democratic	July 29, 1941 – January 3, 1945	77th 78th	Elected to finish Edelstein's term. Re-elected in 1942. Retired to run for New York State Supreme Court.	1933–1943 [data missing]
Arthur G. Klein (New York)	Democratic	July 29, 1941 – January 3, 1945	77th 78th	Elected to finish Edelstein's term. Re-elected in 1942. Retired to run for New York State Supreme Court.	1943–1953 [data missing]
Leo F. Rayfiel (Brooklyn)	Democratic	January 3, 1945 – September 13, 1947	79th 80th	Elected in 1944. Re-elected in 1946. Resigned.	1943–1953 [data missing]
Vacant		September 13, 1947 – November 4, 1947	80th		1943–1953 [data missing]
Abraham J. Multer (New York)	Democratic	November 4, 1947 – January 3, 1953	80th 81st 82nd	Elected to finish Rayfiel's term. Re-elected in 1948. Re-elected in 1950. Redistricted to the 13th district.	1943–1953 [data missing]
John J. Rooney (Brooklyn)	Democratic	January 3, 1953 – December 31, 1974	83rd 84th 85th 86th 87th 88th 89th 90th 91st 92nd 93rd	Redistricted from the 12th district and re-elected in 1952. Re-elected in 1954. Re-elected in 1956. Re-elected in 1958. Re-elected in 1960. Re-elected in 1962. Re-elected in 1964. Re-elected in 1966. Re-elected in 1968. Re-elected in 1970. Re-elected in 1972. Retired and resigned.	1953–1963 [data missing]
John J. Rooney (Brooklyn)	Democratic	January 3, 1953 – December 31, 1974	83rd 84th 85th 86th 87th 88th 89th 90th 91st 92nd 93rd	Redistricted from the 12th district and re-elected in 1952. Re-elected in 1954. Re-elected in 1956. Re-elected in 1958. Re-elected in 1960. Re-elected in 1962. Re-elected in 1964. Re-elected in 1966. Re-elected in 1968. Re-elected in 1970. Re-elected in 1972. Retired and resigned.	1963–1973 [data missing]
John J. Rooney (Brooklyn)	Democratic	January 3, 1953 – December 31, 1974	83rd 84th 85th 86th 87th 88th 89th 90th 91st 92nd 93rd	Redistricted from the 12th district and re-elected in 1952. Re-elected in 1954. Re-elected in 1956. Re-elected in 1958. Re-elected in 1960. Re-elected in 1962. Re-elected in 1964. Re-elected in 1966. Re-elected in 1968. Re-elected in 1970. Re-elected in 1972. Retired and resigned.	1973–1983 [data missing]
Vacant		December 31, 1974 – January 3, 1975	93rd		1973–1983 [data missing]
Fred Richmond (Brooklyn)	Democratic	January 3, 1975 – August 25, 1982	94th 95th 96th 97th	Elected in 1974. Re-elected in 1976. Re-elected in 1978. Re-elected in 1980. Resigned.	1973–1983 [data missing]
Vacant		August 25, 1982 – January 3, 1983	97th		1973–1983 [data missing]
Guy Molinari (Staten Island)	Republican	January 3, 1983 – December 31, 1989	98th 99th 100th 101st	Redistricted from the 17th district and re-elected in 1982. Re-elected in 1984. Re-elected in 1986. Re-elected in 1988. Resigned to become Borough President of Staten Island.	1983–1993; All of Staten Island and most of Lower Manhattan
Vacant		December 31, 1989 – March 20, 1990	101st		1983–1993; All of Staten Island and most of Lower Manhattan
Susan Molinari (Staten Island)	Republican	March 20, 1990 – January 3, 1993	101st 102nd	Elected to finish her father's term. Re-elected later in 1990. Redistricted to the 13th district.	1983–1993; All of Staten Island and most of Lower Manhattan
Carolyn Maloney (New York)	Democratic	January 3, 1993 – January 3, 2013	103rd 104th 105th 106th 107th 108th 109th 110th 111th 112th	Elected in 1992. Re-elected in 1994. Re-elected in 1996. Re-elected in 1998. Re-elected in 2000. Re-elected in 2002. Re-elected in 2004. Re-elected in 2006. Re-elected in 2008. Re-elected in 2010. Redistricted to the 12th district.	1993–2003 [data missing]
Carolyn Maloney (New York)	Democratic	January 3, 1993 – January 3, 2013	103rd 104th 105th 106th 107th 108th 109th 110th 111th 112th	Elected in 1992. Re-elected in 1994. Re-elected in 1996. Re-elected in 1998. Re-elected in 2000. Re-elected in 2002. Re-elected in 2004. Re-elected in 2006. Re-elected in 2008. Re-elected in 2010. Redistricted to the 12th district.	2003–2013 Central Park and the East Side of Manhattan; all of Roosevelt Island; and the neighborhoods of Astoria, Long Island City, and Sunnyside in Queens
Joe Crowley (Queens)	Democratic	January 3, 2013 – January 3, 2019	113th 114th 115th	Redistricted from the 7th district and re-elected in 2012. Re-elected in 2014. Re-elected in 2016. Lost re-nomination and then lost re-election as a Working Families.	2013–2023 The eastern part of the Bronx and part of north-central Queens
Alexandria Ocasio-Cortez (Queens)	Democratic	January 3, 2019 – present	116th 117th 118th 119th	Elected in 2018. Re-elected in 2020. Re-elected in 2022. Re-elected in 2024. Re-elected in 2026.	2013–2023 The eastern part of the Bronx and part of north-central Queens
Alexandria Ocasio-Cortez (Queens)	Democratic	January 3, 2019 – present	116th 117th 118th 119th	Elected in 2018. Re-elected in 2020. Re-elected in 2022. Re-elected in 2024. Re-elected in 2026.	2023–2025 The eastern part of the Bronx and part of north-central Queens
Alexandria Ocasio-Cortez (Queens)	Democratic	January 3, 2019 – present	116th 117th 118th 119th	Elected in 2018. Re-elected in 2020. Re-elected in 2022. Re-elected in 2024. Re-elected in 2026.	2025–present The eastern part of the Bronx and part of north-central Queens

== Electoral history ==
Note that in New York State electoral politics there are numerous minor parties at various points on the political spectrum. Certain parties will invariably endorse either the Republican or Democratic candidate for every office, hence the state electoral results contain both the party votes, and the final candidate votes (Listed as "Recap").

1870 election: District 14
Party	Candidate	Votes	%	±%
Democratic	Eli Perry	17,716	54.1%	
Republican	Minard Harder	14,726	44.9%	
Labor Reform Party	John Hastings	336	1.0%	
Majority		2,990	9.2%	
Turnout		32,778	100%	

[data missing]

1896 election: District 14
Party	Candidate	Votes	%
Republican	Lemuel Quigg (incumbent)	27,875	54.9%
Democratic	John Quincy Adams	18,533	36.5%
National Democratic	Charles V. Fornes	2,414	4.8%
Socialist Labor	Richard Morton	1,235	2.4%
Prohibition	Benjamin T Rogers	137	0.3%
None	Blank and scattering	548	1.1%
Total votes		50,762	100%

1898 election: District 14
Party	Candidate	Votes	%
Democratic	William Astor Chanler	31,604	54.3%
Republican	Lemuel Quigg (incumbent)	25,209	43.3%
Socialist Labor	Emil Neppel	1,307	1.1%
Prohibition	Albert T. Wadhams	104	0.1%
Total votes		58,224	100%

1900 election: District 14
Party	Candidate	Votes	%
Republican	William H. Douglas	36,904	52.0%
Democratic	John S. Hill	32,167	45.3%
Social Democratic	Emil Neppel	931	1.3%
Socialist Labor	Peter Carroll	645	0.9%
Prohibition	James H. Yarnall	130	0.2%
Total votes		70,777	100%

1902 election: District 14
Party	Candidate	Votes	%
Democratic	Ira E. Rider	20,402	63.7%
Republican	Andrew J. Anderson	8,492	26.5%
Social Democratic	William Ehret	2,348	7.3%
Socialist Labor	Arthur Chambers	647	2.0%
Liberty Bell Democratic	John J. M. Issing	79	0.2%
Prohibition	John C. Wallace	79	0.2%
Total votes		32,047	100%

1904 election: District 14
Party	Candidate	Votes	%
Democratic	Charles A. Towne	21,627	57.1%
Republican	Lucien Knapp	12,664	33.4%
Social Democratic	William Ehret	2,973	7.8%
Socialist Labor	Lewis Newman	380	1.0%
Populist	Peter A. Leininger	217	0.6%
Prohibition	Albert Wadhams	47	0.1%
Total votes		37,908	100%

1906 election: District 14
Party	Candidate	Votes	%
Democratic	William Willett Jr.	17,675	46.3%
Republican	Frank E. Losee	10,006	26.2%
Independence	Charles E. Shober	8,110	21.3%
Socialist	Richard Morton	2,328	6.1%
Prohibition	Albert Wadhams	40	0.1%
Total votes		38,159	100%

1908 election: District 14
Party	Candidate	Votes	%
Democratic	William Willett Jr. (incumbent)	21,643	52.2%
Republican	Emanuel Castka	14,189	34.2%
Socialist	Phillip H. Schmitt	3,055	7.4%
Independence	Herbert Wade	2,485	6.0%
Prohibition	Joseph. H Ralph	69	0.2%
Total votes		41,451	100%

1910 election: District 14
Party	Candidate	Votes	%
Democratic	John J. Kindred	20,875	54.3%
Republican	Victor Hugo Duras		
Independence	Victor Hugo Duras		
Total	Victor Hugo Duras	14,018	36.5%
Socialist	William Ehret	3,481	9.1%
Prohibition	Joseph H. Ralph	54	0.1%
Total votes		38,428	100%

1912 election: District 14
Party	Candidate	Votes	%
Democratic	Jefferson M. Levy	8,950	49.4%
Progressive	Abraham H. Goodman	4,457	24.6%
Republican	E. Crosby Kindleberger	3,468	19.1%
Socialist	Marie MacDonald	958	5.3%
Independence	James W. Conners	202	1.1%
Jefferson	Henry B. Martin	73	0.4%
Prohibition	Charles H. Simmons	14	0.1%
Total votes		18,122	100%

1914 election: District 14
Party	Candidate	Votes	%
Democratic	Michael F. Farley		
Independence	Michael F. Farley		
Total	Michael F. Farley	7,310	46.5%
Republican	Fiorello H. La Guardia	5,331	33.9%
Socialist	Henry L. Slobodin	1,534	9.8%
Progressive	John B. Golden	1,456	9.3%
Prohibition	James F. Gillespie	82	0.5%
Total votes		15,713	100%

1916 election: District 14
Party	Candidate	Votes	%
Republican	Fiorello H. La Guardia		
National	Fiorello H. La Guardia		
Progressive	Fiorello H. La Guardia		
American	Fiorello H. La Guardia		
Total	Fiorello H. La Guardia	7,272	39.0%
Democratic	Michael F. Farley		
Independence	Michael F. Farley		
Total	Michael F. Farley	6,915	37.0%
Socialist	William I. Sockheim	2,536	13.6%
None	Blank, scattering, defective and void	1,867	10.0%
Prohibition	Samuel Fishman	80	0.4%
Total votes		18,670	100%

1918 election: District 14
Party	Candidate	Votes	%
Republican	Fiorello H. La Guardia		
Democratic	Fiorello H. La Guardia		
Total	Fiorello H. La Guardia (incumbent)	14,523	65.0%
Socialist	Scott Nearing	6,214	27.8%
None	Blank, scattering, defective and void	1,531	6.8%
Prohibition	Alfred H. Saunders	89	0.4%
Total votes		22,357	100%

1920 election: District 14
Party	Candidate	Votes	%
Republican	Nathan D. Perlman	18,042	45.2%
Socialist	Algernon Lee	8,515	21.3%
None	Blank, scattering, defective and void	3,370	8.4%
Total votes		39,927	100%

1922 election: District 14
Party	Candidate	Votes	%
Republican	Nathan D. Perlman (incumbent)	8,782	37.4%
Democratic	David H. Knott	8,173	34.8%
Socialist	Jacob Panken	6,459	27.5%
Prohibition	Kenneth S. Guthrie	94	0.4%
Total votes		23,508	100%

1924 election: District 14
Party	Candidate	Votes	%
Republican	Nathan D. Perlman (incumbent)	12,046	43.5%
Democratic	William Irving Sirovich	11,920	43.0%
Socialist	William Karlin	3,165	11.4%
Workers	Ludwig Lore	216	0.8%
Total votes		27,707	100%

1926 election: District 14
Party	Candidate	Votes	%
Democratic	William Irving Sirovich	11,809	47.4%
Republican	Nathan D. Perlman (incumbent)	10,688	42.9%
Socialist	S.E. Beardsley	1,277	5.1%
None	Blank, void, and scattering	1,060	4.3%
Workers	Alexander Trachtenberg	112	0.4%
Total votes		24,930	100%

1928 election: District 14
Party	Candidate	Votes	%
Democratic	William Irving Sirovich (incumbent)	16,602	52.1%
Republican	Sol Ullman	11,974	37.5%
Socialist	August Claessens	1,648	5.2%
None	Blank	1,359	4.3%
Workers	Alexander Trachtenberg	307	1.0%
Total votes		31,890	100%

1930 election: District 14
Party	Candidate	Votes	%
Democratic	William Irving Sirovich (incumbent)	12,431	47.3%
Socialist	Jacob Panken	6,793	25.9%
Republican	Edward E. Spafford	6,658	25.3%
None	Alexander Trachtenberg	385	1.5%
Total votes		26,267	100%

1932 election: District 14
Party	Candidate	Votes	%
Democratic	William Irving Sirovich (incumbent)	20,668	60.7
Republican	Henry A. Lowenberg	9,651	28.3
Socialist	August Claessens	2,735	8.0
Communist	Abraham Markoff	1,011	3.0
Total votes		34,065	100

1934 election: District 14
Party	Candidate	Votes	%
Democratic	William Irving Sirovich (incumbent)	15,437	48.1
Republican	Frederick J. Groehl	9,744	30.4
None	Blank and scattering	2,868	8.9
Socialist	Rachel Panken	2,259	7.0
Communist	Peter Cacchione	1,612	5.0
Law Preservation	Lyman A. Garber	160	0.5
Total votes		32,080	100

[data missing]

1996 election: District 14
Party	Candidate	Votes	%	±%
Democratic	Carolyn B. Maloney (incumbent)	130,175	72.4%	
Republican	Jeffrey E. Livingston	42,641	23.7%	
Green	Thomas K. Leighton	3,512	2.0%	
Conservative	Joseph A. Lavezzo	2,188	1.2%	
Right to Life	Delco L. Cornett	1,221	0.7%	
Majority		87,534	48.7%	
Turnout		179,737	100%	

1998 election: District 14
Party	Candidate	Votes	%	±%
Democratic	Carolyn B. Maloney (incumbent)	111,072	77.4%	+5.0
Republican	Stephanie E. Kupferman	32,458	22.6%	−1.1
Majority		78,614	54.8%	+6.1
Turnout		143,530	100%	−20.1

2000 election: District 14
Party	Candidate	Votes	%	±%
Democratic	Carolyn B. Maloney (incumbent)	148,080	73.9%	−3.5
Republican	C. Adrienne Rhodes	45,453	22.7%	+0.1
Green	Sandra Stevens	4,869	2.4%	+2.4
Independence	Frederick D. Newman	1,946	1.0%	+1.0
Majority		102,627	51.2%	−3.6
Turnout		200,348	100%	+39.6

2002 election: District 14
Party	Candidate	Votes	%	±%
Democratic	Carolyn B. Maloney (incumbent)	95,931	75.3%	+1.4
Republican	Anton Srdanovic	31,548	24.7%	+2.0
Majority		64,383	50.5%	−0.7
Turnout		127,479	100%	−36.4

2004 election: District 14
Party	Candidate	Votes	%	±%
Democratic	Carolyn B. Maloney (incumbent)	186,688	81.1%	+5.8
Republican	Anton Srdanovic	43,623	18.9%	−5.8
Majority		143,065	62.1%	+11.6
Turnout		230,311	100%	+80.7

2006 election: District 14
Party	Candidate	Votes	%	±%
Democratic	Carolyn B. Maloney (incumbent)	119,582	84.5%	+3.4
Republican	Danniel Maio	21,969	15.5%	−3.4
Majority		97,613	69.0%	+6.9
Turnout		141,551	100%	−38.5

2008 election: District 14
Party	Candidate	Votes	%	±%
Democratic	Carolyn B. Maloney (incumbent)	183,239	79.9%	−4.6
Republican	Robert G. Heim	43,385	18.9%	+3.4
Libertarian	Isaiah Matos	2,659	1.2%	+1.2
Majority		139,854	61.0%	−8.0
Turnout		229,283	100%	+62.0

2010 election: District 14
Party	Candidate	Votes	%	±%
Democratic	Carolyn B. Maloney (incumbent)	107,327	75.1%	−4.8
Republican	David Ryan Brumberg	32,065	22.4%	+3.5
Conservative	Timothy J. Healy	1,891	1.3%	+1.3
Independence	Dino L. LaVerghetta	1,617	1.1%	+1.1
Majority		75,262	52.7%	−8.3
Turnout		142,900	100%	−37.7

2012 US election: District 14
Party	Candidate	Votes	%
Democratic	Joe Crowley	116,117	
Working Families	Joe Crowley	4,644	
Total	Joe Crowley (incumbent)	120,761	83.2%
Republican	William Gibbons	19,191	
Conservative	William Gibbons	2,564	
Total	William Gibbons	21,755	15.0%
Green	Anthony Gronowicz	2,570	1.8%
None	Blank/Void/Scattered	25,915	
Total votes		145,086	100.00%
Democratic hold			

2014 US election: District 14
Party	Candidate	Votes	%
Democratic	Joe Crowley	45,370	67.34%
Working Families	Joe Crowley	4,982	7.39%
Total	Joe Crowley (incumbent)	50,352	74.74%
Conservative	Elizabeth Perri	6,735	10.00%
None	Blank/Void/Write-In	10,285	15.27%
Total votes		67,372	100.00%
Democratic hold			

2016 election: District 14
Party	Candidate	Votes	%
Democratic	Joe Crowley	138,367	70.13%
Working Families	Joe Crowley	7,317	3.71%
Women's Equality	Joe Crowley	1,903	0.96%
Total	Joe Crowley (incumbent)	147,587	74.80%
Republican	Frank J. Spotorno	26,891	13.63%
Conservative	Frank J. Spotorno	3,654	1.85%
Total	Frank J. Spotorno	30,545	15.48%
None	Blank/Void/Scattering	19,169	9.72%
Total votes		197,301	100.00%
Democratic hold			

2018 election: District 14
Party	Candidate	Votes	%
Democratic	Alexandria Ocasio-Cortez	100,044	78.0%
Republican	Anthony Pappas	17,762	13.8%
Working Families	Joe Crowley (incumbent)	8,505	6.6%
Conservative	Elizabeth Perri	2,028	1.6%
Reform	James Dillon	N/A	N/A
Total votes		128,339	100.0%
Democratic hold			

2020 election: District 14
Party	Candidate	Votes	%
Democratic	Alexandria Ocasio-Cortez (incumbent)	152,661	71.6%
Republican	John Cummings	58,440	27.4%
SAM	Michelle Caruso-Cabrera	2,000	0.9%
Total votes		213,323	100.0%
Democratic hold			

2022 election: District 14
Party	Candidate	Votes	%
Democratic	Alexandria Ocasio-Cortez	74,050	63.4%
Working Families	Alexandria Ocasio-Cortez	8,403	7.2%
Total	Alexandria Ocasio-Cortez (incumbent)	82,453	70.6%
Republican	Tina Forte	31,935	27.3%
Conservative	Desi Cuellar	2,208	1.9%
Write-in		194	0.2%
Total votes		116,790	100.0%
Democratic hold			

2024 election: District 14
Party	Candidate	Votes	%
Democratic	Alexandria Ocasio-Cortez	118,477	61.8
Working Families	Alexandria Ocasio-Cortez	14,237	7.4
Total	Alexandria Ocasio-Cortez (incumbent)	132,714	69.2
Republican	Tina Forte	54,157	28.2
Conservative	Tina Forte	4,921	2.6
Total	Tina Forte	59,078	30.8
Total votes		191,792	100.0
Democratic hold			

== See also ==
- List of United States congressional districts
- New York's congressional delegations
- New York's congressional districts

== Bibliography ==
- Martis, Kenneth C. (1989). The Historical Atlas of Political Parties in the United States Congress. New York: Macmillan Publishing Company.
- Martis, Kenneth C. (1982). The Historical Atlas of United States Congressional Districts. New York: Macmillan Publishing Company.
- Congressional Biographical Directory of the United States 1774–present
- 2004 House election data Clerk of the House of Representatives
- 2002 House election data "
- 2000 House election data "
- 1998 House election data "
- 1996 House election data "
