= Robert McC. Marsh =

American politician (1878–1958)

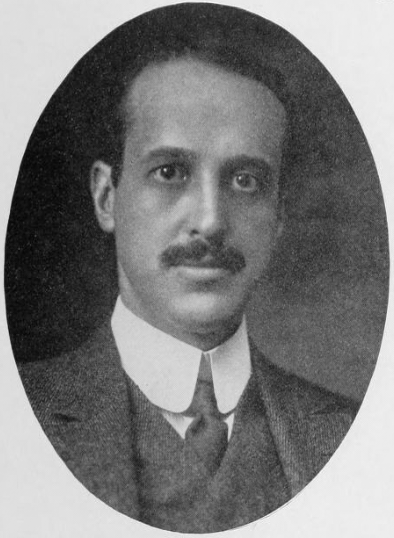

Justice of the New York Supreme Court
- In office 1922

Member of the New York State Assembly
- In office 1916–1917
- Constituency: New York County 25th District

Personal details
- Born: January 8, 1878 Paterson, New Jersey, US
- Died: September 9, 1958 (aged 80) New London, Connecticut, US
- Resting place: Green-Wood Cemetery
- Party: Republican
- Spouse: Charlotte Delafield (m. 1921)
- Children: 1
- Education: Harvard College; Columbia Law School
- Occupation: Lawyer, politician, judge

Robert McCurdy Marsh (January 8, 1878 – September 9, 1958) was an American lawyer, politician, and judge from New York.

== Life ==
Marsh was born on January 8, 1878, in Paterson, New Jersey, the son of Elias Joseph Marsh and Sarah Lord McCurdy. He attended St. Mark's School in Southborough, Massachusetts. He then went to Harvard College from 1895 to 1899, graduating from there with an A.B. in the latter year.

After graduating from Harvard, Marsh spent fourteen months in Europe, spending half his time traveling in England, France, Italy, and Switzerland. He spent the other half of his time studying in University College in Oxford and taking a special course in Roman law and English constitutional history. In 1900, while traveling, he received an A.M. from Harvard for work he did before he graduated. In the fall of 1900, he entered Columbia Law School. He graduated from there in 1903, and in the spring of that year he was admitted to the New York bar. After a three-month visit to the Pacific coast in the summer of 1903, he began practicing law in New York City. He spent two and a half years working in the firm of Guthrie, Cravath and Henderson. He then became associated with the firm Howland, Murray, and Preintice at 24 Wall Street from 1906 to 1910. He then became associated with the firm Sullivan & Cromwell. His law practice was varied and dealt mainly in the reorganization of corporations, the examination of corporate securities, and the management of estates. He was an alternate delegate to the 1912 Republican National Convention and supported the renomination of William Howard Taft. In 1913, he attended a meeting of the Republican National Committee in Washington, D.C. and on behalf of the New York Young Republican Club presented a plan for the reapportionment of delegates and other reforms to prevent a repeat of the 1912 Convention which was adapted by the Committee.

By 1916, Marsh's law office was in 49 Wall Street. He was president of the Madison Square Republican Club and the New York Young Republican Club. In 1915, he was elected to the New York State Assembly as a Republican, representing the New York County 25th District. He served in the Assembly in 1916 and 1917. In May 1917, he entered the Officers' Training Camp in Plattsburgh. In November 1917, he was commissioned a captain in Field Artillery. In December 1917, he was attached to Battery E, 351st Field Artillery, 92nd Division in Camp Meade, Maryland. In April 1918, he was detailed to the Gas Experimental Grounds in Lakehurst, New Jersey, and designated chief artillery officer. In September 1918, he was detailed to the School of Fire in Fort Sill, Oklahoma. In December 1918, he was sent to the Field Artillery Central Officers' Training School in Camp Zachary Taylor, Kentucky, as an instructor. He was discharged from military service at the end of the year. In April 1919, he was commissioned a major of the Field Artillery Officers' Reserve Corps. He later became a lieutenant colonel of the Corps.

In 1922, Marsh was appointed to the New York Supreme Court to fill a vacancy. From 1923 to 1929, he was a member of the law firm Marsh & Pfeiffer. In 1929, he became a member of the law firm Delafield, Throne & Marsh. He was still a member of the latter firm when he died. In the 1940s, he served as Compliance Commissioner for the War Production Board for New York State and Northern New Jersey. From 1943 to 1949, he was a member of the appeals board of the Motion Picture Arbitration Tribunals. He was a member of the New York City Board of Health from 1945 until his resignation in 1954.

Marsh was an executive committee member of the New York City Bar Association. He was on the board of managers of the Seamen's Church Institute and the legislative and city committees of the Citizens Union. He was a member of the Harvard Club of New York, the University Club, the Atlantic Yacht Club, and the New York City Bar Association, the Academy of Political Science, the New York State Bar Association, the American Legion, and the Military Order of the World War. He was an Episcopalian. In 1921, he married Charlotte Delafield. Their daughter was Mrs. Charlotte Prime Eldredge. He was also president of the New York County Lawyers' Association from 1940 to 1942, a member of the house of delegates of the American Bar Association, president of the New York School for the Deaf and the Church Club of New York, a vice-president of the Protestant Council of New York, and a member of the general board of the National Council of Churches.

Marsh died in Lawrence Memorial Hospital in New London, Connecticut, on September 9, 1958. He was staying at his summer home in Old Lyme, at the time. He was buried in Green-Wood Cemetery.

New York State Assembly
Preceded by Francis R. Stoddard Jr.	New York State Assembly; New York County, 25th District; 1916–1917	Succeeded by District Abolished
