= Elmer Rosenberg =

American politician

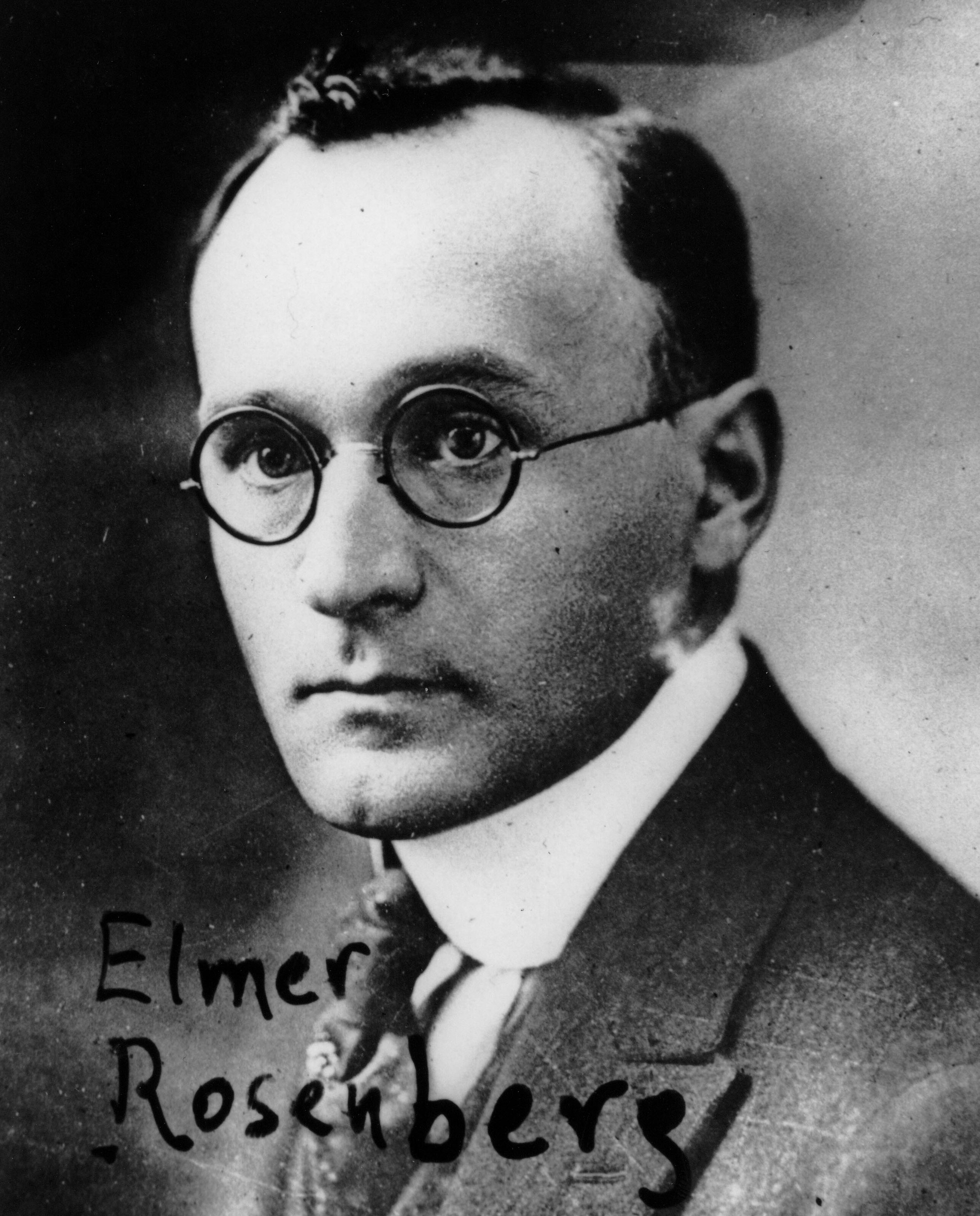
- Rosenberg c. 1918

Member of the New York State Assembly from the 6th New York district
- In office January 1, 1918 – December 31, 1918
- Preceded by: Nathan D. Perlman
- Succeeded by: Sol Ullman

Personal details
- Born: November 18, 1885 Újpest, Austria-Hungary
- Died: April 10, 1951 (aged 65) Miami, Florida, U.S.
- Party: Socialist
- Occupation: Labor leader, politician

Elmer Rosenberg (November 18, 1885 – April 10, 1951) was a Hungarian-American labor leader and politician from New York.

== Life ==
He was born in Újpest, which is now a district of Budapest, Hungary, and attended the public schools there. He emigrated to the United States in 1900, and became a cloth cutter in New York City. He graduated from Rand School of Social Science. He was President of Local 10 of the Amalgamated Ladies' Garment Cutters Union; and President of the Joint Board of the Cloak, Skirt and Reefer Makers' Union. He oversaw multiple strikes by textile workers and often participated in pay and working-condition discussions between garment unions and manufacturers.

He was a Socialist member of the New York State Assembly (New York Co., 6th D.) in 1918.

In 1920, he left New York City and moved to Lake Huntington, Sullivan County, New York, where he bought a boarding house. He married Rose Braverman.

His son, Robert Rosenberg, (b. 1925) was a history teacher and hotel owner. His daughter Esterita "Cissie" (Rosenberg) Blumberg (1928–2004) published a book of memoirs: Remember the Catskills: Tales of a Recovering Hotelkeeper (1997).

Rosenberg died in Miami, Florida on April 10, 1951.

== Sources ==
- NEW PROTOCOL ENDS NEEDLE STRIKE FEAR in NYT on July 5, 1915
- CLOAKMAKERS ASK 20 PER CENT. RISE in NYT on June 17, 1917
- GUIDE FOR VOTERS BY CITIZENS UNION in NYT on October 28, 1917
- New York Red Book (1918; pg. 166)
- NOMINEES ANALYZED BY CITIZENS UNION in NYT on October 27, 1918
- ELMER ROSENBERG in NYT on April 12, 1951 (subscription required)
- Looking Back For a Future In the Catskills in NYT on May 8, 1997
- "Paid Notice: Deaths BLUMBERG, ESTERITA (CISSIE)". The New York Times. September 7, 2004.

New York State Assembly
Preceded by Nathan D. Perlman	New York State Assembly; New York County, 6th District; 1918	Succeeded by Sol Ullman
