= William Willett Jr. =

American politician (1869–1938)

William F. Willett, Jr.
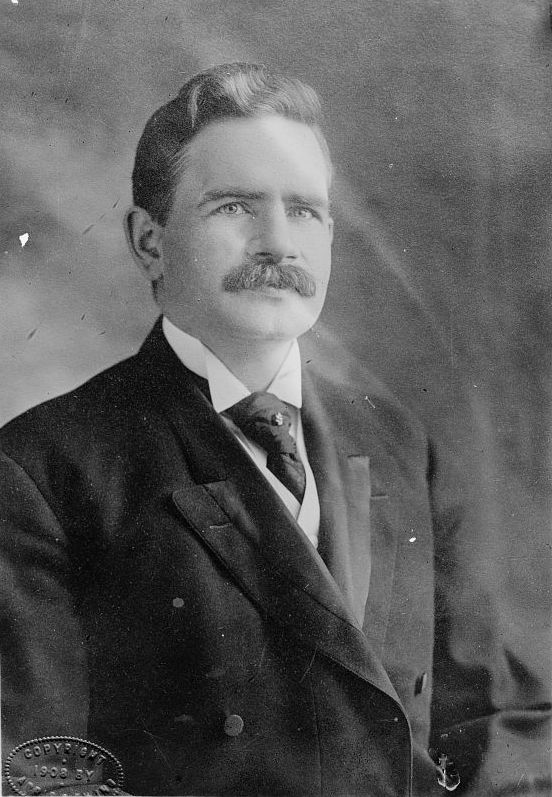
- Willett, c. 1910–1915

Member of the U.S. House of Representatives from New York's 14th district
- In office March 4, 1907 – March 3, 1911
- Preceded by: Charles A. Towne
- Succeeded by: John J. Kindred

Personal details
- Born: William Forte Willett Jr. November 27, 1869 New York City, New York, U.S.
- Died: February 12, 1938 (aged 68) New York City, New York, U.S.
- Resting place: Evergreen Cemetery, Brooklyn, New York
- Party: Democratic
- Education: New York University (LLB)

William Forte Willett Jr. (November 27, 1869 – February 12, 1938) was an American lawyer and politician who served two terms as a U.S. representative from New York from 1907 to 1911 and fourteen months in Sing Sing for conspiracy and bribery shortly thereafter.

== Early life and education ==
William Willett Jr. was born in Brooklyn, New York, on November 27, 1869. He attended the public schools of his native city and then graduated from the law department of New York University, New York City, in 1895. He was admitted to the bar the following year and commenced the practice of law in New York City.

== Congress ==
Willett was elected as a Democrat to the Sixtieth and Sixty-first Congresses (March 4, 1907 - March 3, 1911).

On January 18, 1909, Willett denounced President Theodore Roosevelt in a speech that was so outrageous that he was ordered to sit down, and the House voted 126 to 78 against allowing him to continue. On January 27, the House, by voice vote, expunged the speech from the Congressional Record for "language improper and in violation of the privileges of debate".

Willett did not stand for renomination in 1910.

== Conspiracy and bribery ==
Willett was indicted in 1912 on charges that he paid Democratic Party leaders for a seat on the State Supreme Court. In 1913, he was convicted of conspiracy and bribery. After exhausting his appeals he served 14 months in Sing Sing.

== Real estate ==
Willett then went into the real estate business.

== Death ==
Willett died in New York City on February 12, 1938, his body interred in Cemetery of the Evergreens, Brooklyn.

== Electoral history ==
1906 election: District 14
Party	Candidate	Votes	%
Democratic	William Willett Jr.	17,675	46.3%
Republican	Frank E. Losee	10,006	26.2%
Independence	Charles E. Shober	8,110	21.3%
Socialist	Richard Morton	2,328	6.1%
Prohibition	Albert Wadhams	40	0.1%
Total votes		38,159	100%

1908 election: District 14
Party	Candidate	Votes	%
Democratic	William Willett Jr. (incumbent)	21,643	52.2%
Republican	Emanuel Castka	14,189	34.2%
Socialist	Phillip H. Schmitt	3,055	7.4%
Independence	Herbert Wade	2,485	6.0%
Prohibition	Joseph. H Ralph	69	0.2%
Total votes		41,451	100%

U.S. House of Representatives
Preceded by Charles A. Towne	Member of the U.S. House of Representatives from New York's 14th congressional district 1907–1911	Succeeded by John J. Kindred
