= Nathan D. Perlman =

American politician

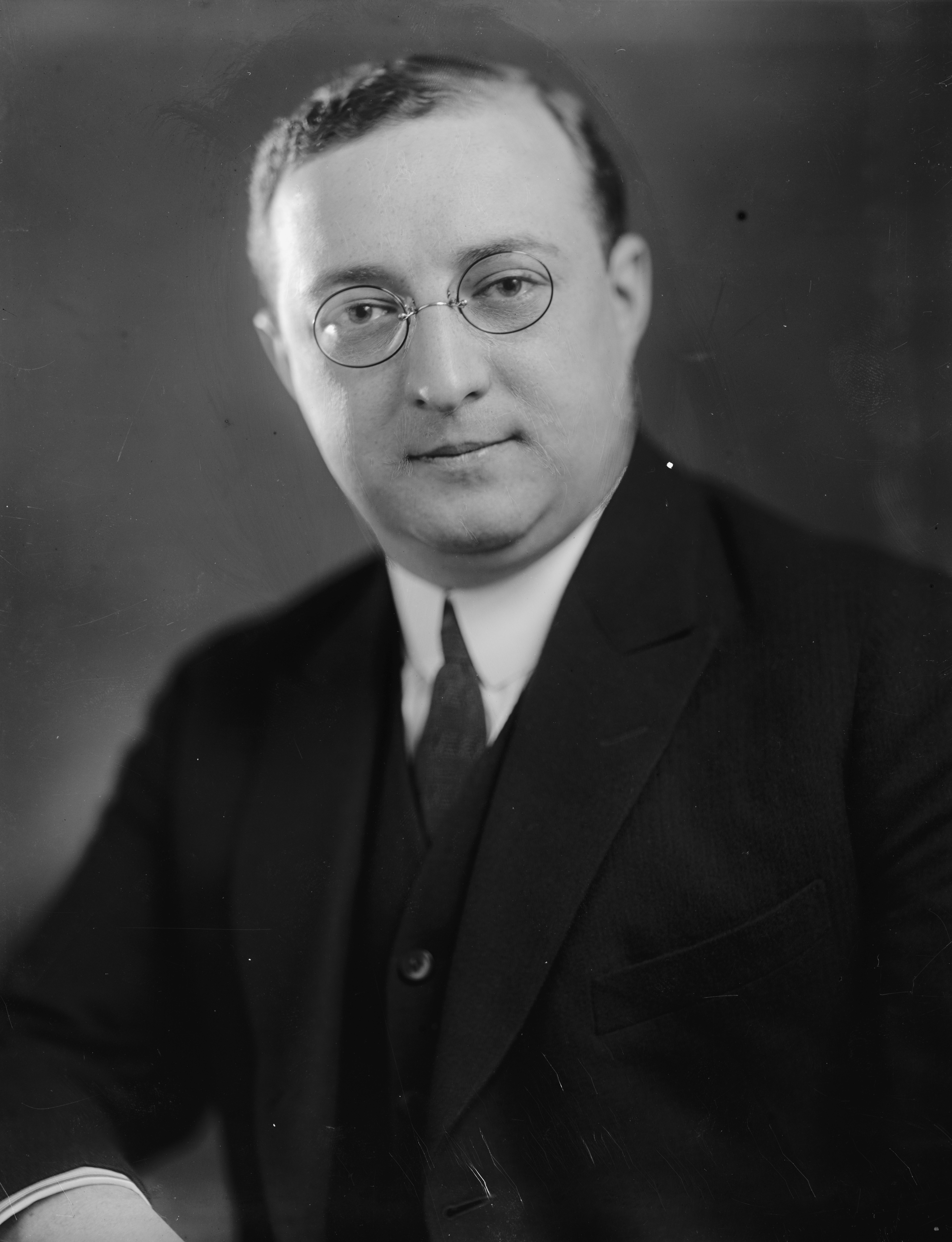
- Portrait by Harris & Ewing c. 1920–1927

Member of the U.S. House of Representatives from New York's 14th district
- In office November 2, 1920 – March 3, 1927
- Preceded by: Fiorello La Guardia
- Succeeded by: William I. Sirovich

Member of the New York State Assembly from the 6th New York district
- In office January 1, 1915 – December 31, 1917
- Preceded by: William Sulzer
- Succeeded by: Elmer Rosenberg

Personal details
- Born: Nathan David Perlman; August 2, 1887 Prusice, Congress Poland, Russian Empire
- Died: June 29, 1952 (aged 64) New York City, U.S.
- Party: Republican
- Education: College of the City of New York; New York University Law School

Nathan David Perlman (August 2, 1887 – June 29, 1952) was an American lawyer and politician from New York who served as a member of the U.S. House of Representatives from 1920 to 1927.

== Life ==
Born in Prusice, Congress Poland (then part of the Russian Empire), Perlman immigrated to the United States in 1891 with his mother where they settled in New York City. After attending the city's public schools he pursued higher education by attending College of the City of New York; and New York University Law School. Perlman graduated from law school in 1907, was admitted to the bar in 1909, and practiced law in New York City.

=== State assembly ===
Perlman was a Special Deputy New York Attorney General from 1912 to 1914; and a member of the New York State Assembly (New York Co., 6th D.) in 1915, 1916 and 1917.

=== Congress ===
He was elected as a Republican to the 66th United States Congress to fill the vacancy caused by the resignation of Fiorello H. La Guardia. Perlman was re-elected to the 67th, 68th and 69th United States Congresses, holding office from November 2, 1920, to March 3, 1927.

=== Later career ===
Afterwards Perlman resumed the practice of law. He was a delegate to the New York State Convention to enact the Twenty-first Amendment, and then became a New York City Magistrate serving from May 1, 1935, to September 1, 1936.

Perlman wanted to disrupt rallies in New York organized by the German American Bund, but could not find any legal means or justification to do so. Setting the law aside, Perlman then conspired with the organized crime figure Meyer Lansky to violently attack the rallies using Jewish mobsters. These attacks went on for months.

At the New York state election, 1936, he ran on the Republican ticket for New York Attorney General but was defeated by the incumbent John J. Bennett Jr. He was then appointed as a justice of the Court of Special Sessions of the City of New York on November 26, 1936, and was re-appointed on July 1, 1945.

Perlman was a senior official of the American Jewish Congress and, in 1945, consulted with and provided assistance to U.S. Supreme Court Justice Robert H. Jackson, President Truman's appointee to serve as chief U.S. prosecutor of Nazi war criminals.

=== Death and burial ===
Perlman died at Beth Israel Hospital in New York City, and was buried at Mount Hebron Cemetery in Queens.

== Electoral history ==
1920 election: District 14
Party	Candidate	Votes	%
Republican	Nathan D. Perlman	18,042	45.2%
Socialist	Algernon Lee	8,515	21.3%
None	Blank, scattering, defective and void	3,370	8.4%
Total votes		39,927	100%

1922 election: District 14
Party	Candidate	Votes	%
Republican	Nathan D. Perlman (incumbent)	8,782	37.4%
Democratic	David H. Knott	8,173	34.8%
Socialist	Jacob Panken	6,459	27.5%
Prohibition	Kenneth S. Guthrie	94	0.4%
Total votes		23,508	100%

1924 election: District 14
Party	Candidate	Votes	%
Republican	Nathan D. Perlman (incumbent)	12,046	43.5%
Democratic	William Irving Sirovich	11,920	43.0%
Socialist	William Karlin	3,165	11.4%
Workers	Ludwig Lore	216	0.8%
Total votes		27,707	100%

1926 election: District 14
Party	Candidate	Votes	%
Democratic	William Irving Sirovich	11,809	47.4%
Republican	Nathan D. Perlman (incumbent)	10,688	42.9%
Socialist	S.E. Beardsley	1,277	5.1%
None	Blank, void, and scattering	1,060	4.3%
Workers	Alexander Trachtenberg	112	0.4%
Total votes		24,930	100%

== See also ==
- List of Jewish members of the United States Congress

== Sources ==
- United States Congress. "Nathan D. Perlman (id: P000239)". Biographical Directory of the United States Congress.

Party political offices
Preceded by William T. Powers	Republican nominee for Attorney General of New York; 1936	Succeeded by Arthur V. McDermott
New York State Assembly
Preceded by William Sulzer	New York State Assembly; New York County, 6th District; 1915–1917	Succeeded by Elmer Rosenberg
U.S. House of Representatives
Preceded by Fiorello H. LaGuardia	Member of the U.S. House of Representatives from New York's 14th congressional district 1920–1927	Succeeded by William I. Sirovich
