= William H. Douglas =

American politician (1853–1944)

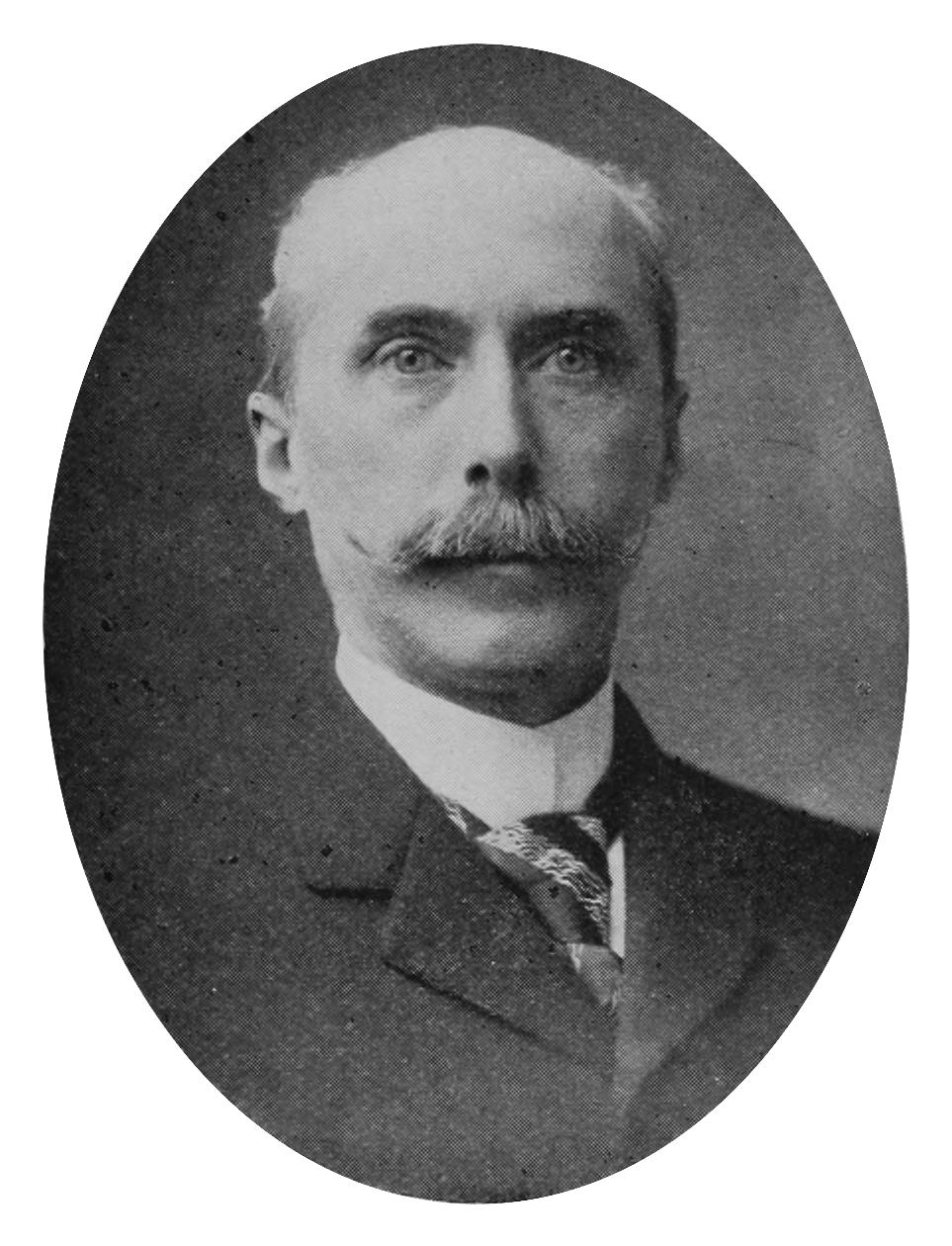

Member of the U.S. House of Representatives from New York
- In office March 4, 1901 – March 3, 1905
- Preceded by: William A. Chanler
- Succeeded by: J. Van Vechten Olcott
- Constituency: 14th district (1901–03); 15th district (1903–05)

Personal details
- Born: William Harris Douglas; December 5, 1853 New York City, New York
- Died: January 27, 1944 (aged 90) New York City, New York
- Resting place: Sleepy Hollow Cemetery, Tarrytown, New York
- Party: Republican
- Education: City College of New York

William Harris Douglas (December 5, 1853 – January 27, 1944) was an American businessman and politician who served two terms as a U.S. representative from New York from 1901 to 1905.

== Biography ==
Born in New York City, Douglas attended private schools and the College of the City of New York. He entered the exporting and importing trade business.

=== Congress ===
Douglas was elected as a Republican to the Fifty-seventh and Fifty-eighth Congresses (March 4, 1901 – March 3, 1905).

He declined to be a candidate for renomination in 1904.

=== Later career ===
He resumed his former business pursuits. He served as delegate to the Republican National Conventions in 1908, 1912, and 1916.

=== Death and burial ===
He died in New York City on January 27, 1944, and was interred in Sleepy Hollow Cemetery, Tarrytown, New York.

U.S. House of Representatives
Preceded by William A. Chanler	Member of the U.S. House of Representatives from New York's 14th congressional district 1901–1903	Succeeded by Ira E. Rider
Preceded by Jacob Ruppert, Jr.	Member of the U.S. House of Representatives from New York's 15th congressional district 1903–1905	Succeeded by J. Van Vechten Olcott
