= Morris Weinfeld =

American politician

Morris Weinfeld (December 28, 1898 – April 13, 1988) was a Jewish-American lawyer, politician, and judge from New York.

== Life ==
Weinfeld was born on December 28, 1898, in New York City, New York, the son of Abraham Weinfeld and Fannie Singer. His brother was United States District Judge Edward Weinfeld.

Weinfeld graduated from New York University School of Law in 1921. He had a law office on 25 Broadway.

In 1923, Weinfeld was elected to the New York State Assembly as a Democrat, representing the New York County 6th District. He served in the Assembly in 1924, 1925, 1926, and 1927. He later served as Deputy Attorney General of New York, and in the 1930s he worked for the National Labor Relations Board. He served as a judge for the Criminal Court from 1960 to 1968. After he retired from the bench, he joined the Manhattan law firm Blum, Haimoff, Gersen, Lipson, Garley & Neidergang and was involved with the firm until his health declined in 1987.

Weinfeld was a member of the Odd Fellows and Phi Sigma Delta. In 1925, he married Beatrice Margel. They had a son, Bernard. In 1929, they lived separately, and by 1932 she was seeing singer Arthur Tracy. When Weinfeld found out, he had Tracy arrested for violating the Mann Act. In 1938, he married widow Beatrice Ladin Block in a ceremony performed by Rabbi Stephen S. Wise. Block was the first national secretary of the American Jewish Congress, a delegate to the first World Jewish Congress, and an organizer of the Bundles for Britain Agency.

Weinfeld died from a cardiac arrest in a Queens nursing home on April 13, 1988. He was buried in Mount Hebron Cemetery.

New York State Assembly
Preceded by Sol Ullman	New York State Assembly; New York County, 6th District; 1924–1927	Succeeded by Louis J. Lefkowitz
