= Melvin Baldwin =

American politician (1838–1901)

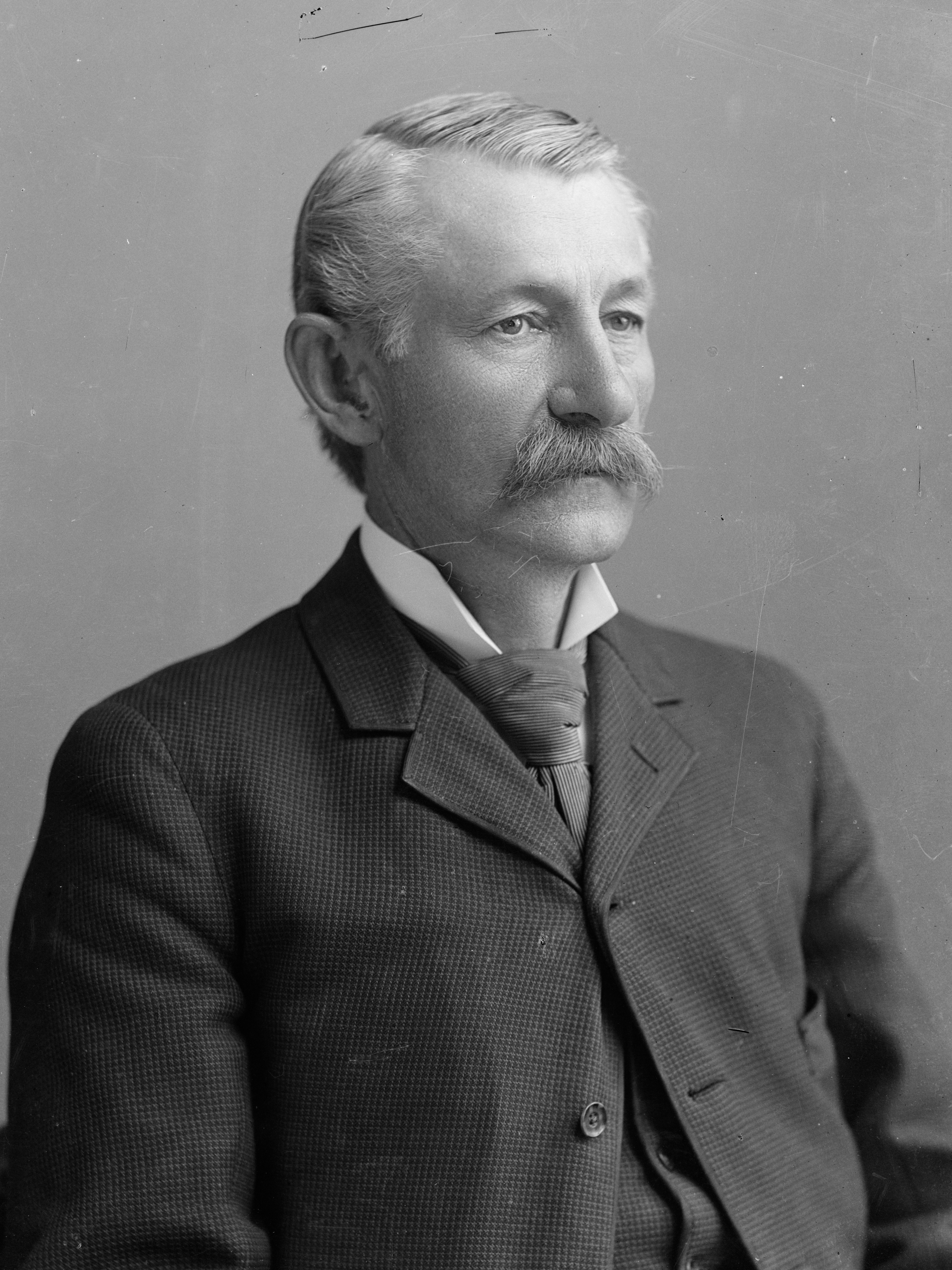
- Baldwin c. 1891–1894

Member of the U.S. House of Representatives from Minnesota's 6th district
- In office March 4, 1893 – March 3, 1895
- Preceded by: District established
- Succeeded by: Charles A. Towne

Personal details
- Born: April 12, 1838 Near Chester, Vermont
- Died: April 15, 1901 (aged 63) Seattle, Washington, U.S.
- Cause of death: Suicide
- Resting place: Forest Hill Cemetery, Duluth, Minnesota
- Party: Democratic
- Education: Lawrence University
- Occupation: civil engineer

Military service
- Allegiance: United States
- Branch/service: United States Volunteers; Union Army
- Years of service: 1861–1864
- Rank: Captain, USV
- Unit: 2nd Reg. Wis. Vol. Infantry
- Battles/wars: American Civil War

Melvin Riley Baldwin (April 12, 1838 – April 15, 1901) was an American railroad engineer and Democratic politician. He served one term in the United States House of Representatives, representing Minnesota in the Fifty-third Congress. Earlier, he served in the Iron Brigade of the Army of the Potomac through most of the American Civil War.

== Early life and education ==
Baldwin was born near Chester, Vermont, on April 12, 1838, and moved with his parents to Oshkosh, Wisconsin Territory, in 1847. He attended the common schools there and entered Lawrence University, Appleton, Wisconsin, in 1855. He studied law but adopted civil engineering as a profession.

== Career and service in the Civil War ==
He was engaged on the Chicago & North Western Railway until April 19, 1861, when he enlisted as a private in Company E, 2nd Wisconsin Infantry Regiment due to the Civil War. He was commissioned captain of his company and was later captured at Gettysburg and confined in Libby Prison, Richmond, Virginia, at Macon, Georgia, and at Charleston and Columbia, South Carolina, being prisoner for eighteen months.

After the war, he engaged in operative railway work in Kansas, being general superintendent for four years. He moved to Duluth, Minnesota, in 1885.

== U.S. Representative ==
Baldwin was elected as a Democrat to the 53rd congress, (March 4, 1893 – March 3, 1895), but lost his bid for reelection in 1894 to the 54th congress.

== Later life ==
Baldwin was chairman of the Chippewa Indian Commission from 1894 to 1897. He traveled to Alaska in November 1897 and died in Seattle, Washington, April 15, 1901. He committed suicide because of a financial failure. He is interred in Forest Hill Cemetery, Duluth, Minnesota.

U.S. House of Representatives
| New district | Member of the U.S. House of Representatives from Minnesota's 6th congressional district 1893–1895 | Succeeded by Charles A. Towne |
