= Charles A. Towne =

American politician (1858–1928)

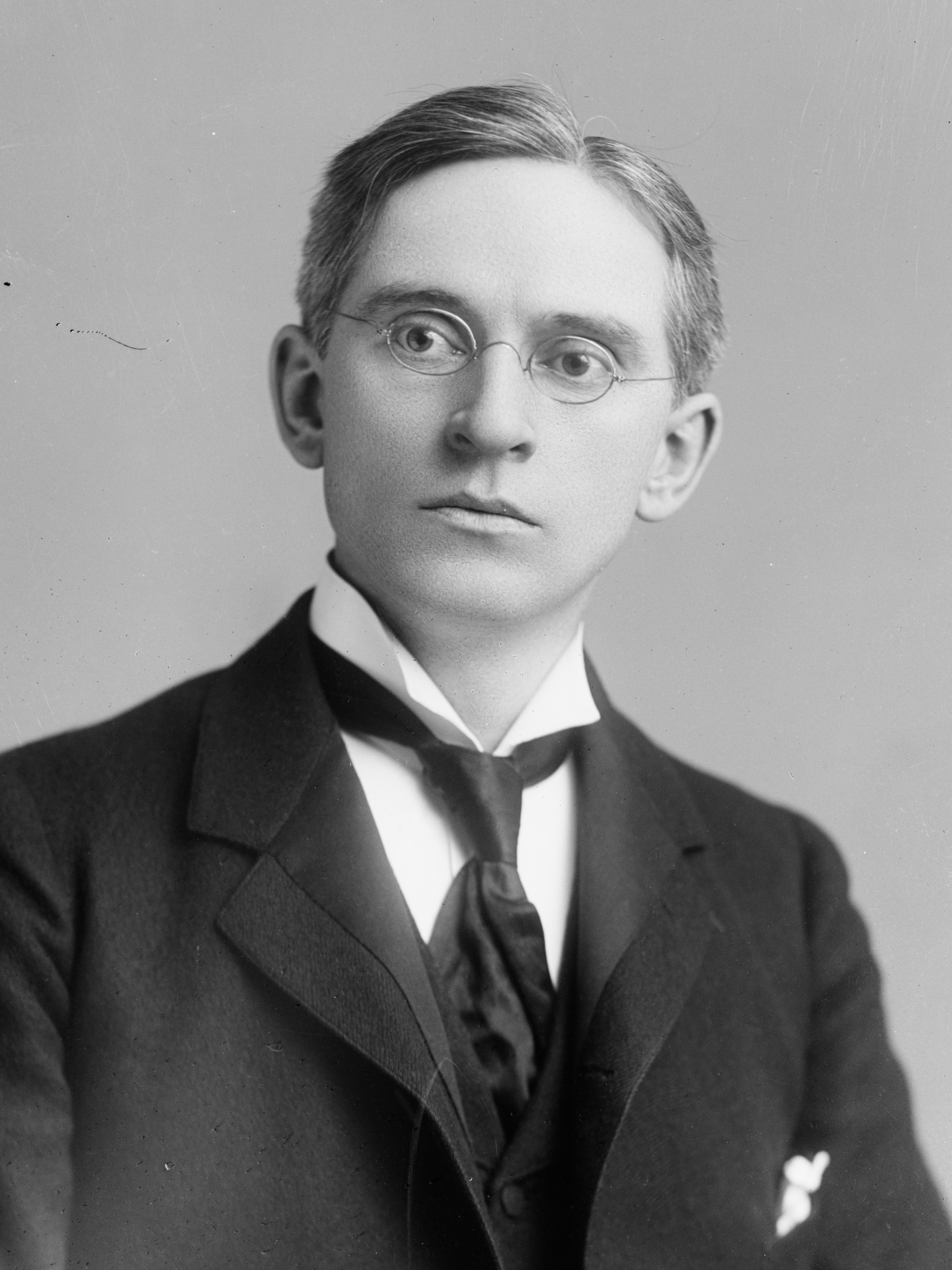
- Towne c. 1894–1901

United States Senator from Minnesota
- In office December 5, 1900 – January 28, 1901
- Appointed by: John Lind
- Preceded by: Cushman Davis
- Succeeded by: Moses E. Clapp

Member of the U.S. House of Representatives
- In office March 4, 1905 – March 3, 1907
- Preceded by: Ira E. Rider
- Succeeded by: William Willett Jr.
- Constituency: New York's 14th
- In office March 4, 1895 – March 3, 1897
- Preceded by: Melvin Baldwin
- Succeeded by: Robert P. Morris
- Constituency: Minnesota's 6th

Personal details
- Born: Charles Arnette Towne; November 21, 1858 near Pontiac, Michigan, U.S.
- Died: October 22, 1928 (aged 69) Tucson, Arizona, U.S.
- Resting place: Evergreen Cemetery; Tucson, Arizona, U.S.
- Other political affiliations: Republican (before 1896); Democratic (after 1896)
- Spouse: Maude Irene Wiley (m. 1887; died 1915)
- Education: University of Michigan

Charles Arnette Towne (November 21, 1858 – October 22, 1928) was an American lawyer and politician who served in both houses of United States Congress. He represented Minnesota in the U.S. House of Representatives from 1895 to 1897 and in the U.S. Senate from 1900 to 1901. He later represented New York in the U.S. House of Representatives from 1905 to 1907. He was the last Democratic senator from Minnesota, before the state's Democratic Party merged with the Farmer-Labor Party to form the Minnesota Democratic–Farmer–Labor Party.

== Early life ==
Charles Arnette Towne was born on November 21, 1858, near Pontiac, Michigan. He graduated from the University of Michigan. He studied law and was admitted to the bar in 1885.

== Career ==
Towne began practicing law in Marquette, Michigan, in 1886. He moved to Duluth, Minnesota, in 1890.

=== Congress ===
Towne served in the United States House of Representatives from Minnesota as a Republican in the 54th Congress. Towne also served in the United States Senate in the 56th Congress, from Minnesota as a Democrat following the death of Cushman K. Davis.

Towne was appointed to the Senate by Governor John Lind to fill the vacancy, and served from December 5, 1900, to January 28, 1901, when the elected replacement took office. Towne represented Minnesota in the House from March 4, 1895, to March 3, 1897.

He switched parties in 1896 due to the free silver movement. He ran for re-election in 1896 as an Independent and lost.

== Later career ==
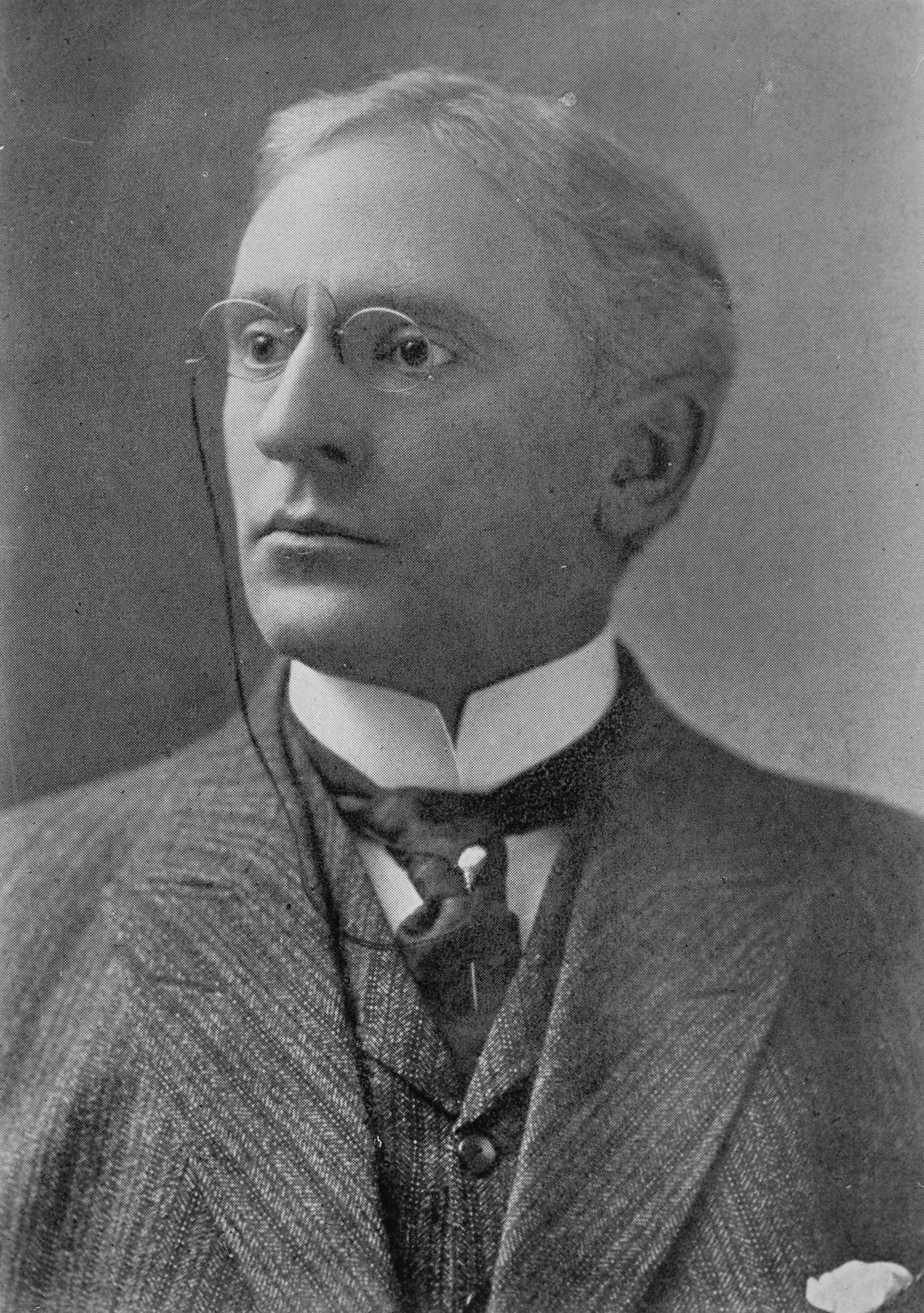
Towne, c. 1920

In 1900, he declined the nomination for Vice President on the People's Party ticket.

Towne moved to New York City in 1901. He worked for the law firm Towne and Spellman at 115 Broadway in New York City.

=== Return to Congress ===
He was elected as a Democrat and served as a U.S. representative in the 59th Congress for the state of New York from March 4, 1905, to March 3, 1907. He was counsel to the emperor of Korea in 1907.

=== Arguments before Supreme Court ===
In December 1915, he and Benjamin F. Spellman represented L. Lawrence Weber as the appellant before the Supreme Court of the United States in the Weber v. Freed case concerning boxing match film distribution. The appeal was denied.

== Personal life ==
Towne married Maude Irene Wiley of Lansing, Michigan, on April 20, 1887.

Towne lived at 790 Riverside Drive when he lived in New York City. Towne traveled to Tucson, Arizona, following an attack of bronchitis in October 1920. He did not move there until 1926.

He lived at the Santa Rita hotel, moved to the Desert Sanitorium and later moved into a home near Tucson.

=== Death and burial ===
Towne died of pneumonia in Tucson on October 22, 1928. He became ill while on tour speaking for Al Smith in Huron, South Dakota. Following hospitalization at Southern Methodist Hospital in Tucson, he died. He was buried at Evergreen Cemetery in Tucson.

U.S. House of Representatives
Preceded by Melvin Baldwin	Member of the U.S. House of Representatives from Minnesota's 6th congressional district 1895–1897	Succeeded by Robert P. Morris
Preceded by Ira E. Rider	Member of the U.S. House of Representatives from New York's 14th congressional district 1905–1907	Succeeded by William Willett, Jr.
U.S. Senate
Preceded by Cushman Davis	U.S. senator (Class 1) from Minnesota; 1900–1901; Served alongside: Knute Nelson	Succeeded by Moses E. Clapp
