= Francis R. Stoddard Jr. =

American politician

Francis Russell Stoddard Jr. (July 26, 1877 – October 11, 1957) was an American lawyer and politician from New York. He served in the New York State Assembly.

== Life ==
Stoddard was born on July 26, 1877, in Boston, Massachusetts, the son of Francis Russell Stoddard and Mary Francis Baldwin.

Stoddard spent some years living in France, Germany, and Italy. He then went to the Boston Latin School, followed by the Hopkinson's School in Boston. He attended Harvard College, graduating from there with a B.A. in 1899. During his senior year, he attended Harvard Law School. After graduating from the college, he went to Buffalo, New York, and studied law in the office of Lockwood, Hoyt and Yeomans. His brother-in-law was the junior member of the firm. He also entered Buffalo Law School, where he joined Phi Delta Phi. Finding office work too confining, he left law school and worked as a managing clerk for the firm Wheeler and Slee. In 1900, he went to Cuba and bought a fruit and tobacco plantation in the Pinar del Río Province and wrote articles for the Havana Post and other newspapers. He left Cuba in December 1901 for health reasons. In January 1902, he moved to New York City, was admitted to the state bar, and joined the legal department of the Brooklyn Rapid Transit Company (where his brother-in-law now worked as general attorney).

In April 1898, Stoddard enlisted in the 1st Massachusetts Heavy Artillery, the first American regiment to be mustered into service for the Spanish-American War. He served with the regiment throughout the war. In 1899, while living in Buffalo, he was commissioned 2nd Lieutenant of the 65th Regiment, New York National Guard. He was promoted to 1st Lieutenant in 1900. He resigned his commission in 1901. In 1902, he was commissioned 2nd Lieutenant of the 14th Regiment, New York National Guard. He was then promoted to 1st Lieutenant and Captain of his company, resigning in 1906.

In 1909, Stoddard left the Brooklyn Rapid Transit Company and joined the law firm Greene, Hurd & Stowell. In 1910, he served as special Deputy Attorney General of New York. In 1911, he was elected to the New York State Assembly as a Republican, representing the New York County 25th District. He served in the Assembly in 1912, 1914, and 1915.

In 1912, Stoddard enlisted in the Veteran Corps of Artillery. During the 1916 Mexican Expedition, he entered the U.S. Army and served on the Mexican border as battalion adjutant in the 71st Infantry, U.S. National Guard. In 1917, when America entered World War I, he was commissioned major in the Coast Artillery Corps of the New York Guard. He was then sent abroad as the ranking member of a commission to study anti-aircraft artillery methods of the 3rd British Army on the Somme front and the 10th French Army on the Aisne front. In 1918, he was commissioned Major of Ordinance. After graduating from the Army War College, he served as Division Ordinance Officer of the 17th Division until his discharge in January 1919. Later that year, he was commissioned Lieutenant-Colonel Ordinance of the Officers Reserve Corps and appointed Division Ordinance Officer of the 98th Division of the organized reserves. From 1923 to 1935, he was a colonel commanding the 53rd Coast Artillery. He retired as a colonel in the Army Reserves. He was also military aide to Mayor La Guardia during World War II and organized the New York City Patrol Corps.

Stoddard was Deputy Superintendent of the New York State Insurance Department from 1915 to 1921, in charge of the department's New York City office. He then served as Superintendent of the Department from 1921 to 1924, also serving as Chairman of the New York State Pension Commission during that time. He was on the Executive Committee of the National Convention of Insurance Commissioners from 1922 to 1924. He was then employed by the New Jersey state legislature to reorganize the state's banking and insurance laws and revise the insurance laws from 1925 to 1926. From 1925 to 1928, he again served as special Deputy Attorney General of New York. In 1927, he became arbitrator for American fidelity and surety companies in Greater New York. In 1933, the governor appointed him a member of the New York State Insurance Board.

Stoddard was governor-general of the General Society of Colonial Wars, deputy governor-general of the Mayflower Society, vice-president of the Saint Nicholas Society, senior vice commander of the New York Commandry of the Loyal Legion, and Standing Committee member of the Society of the Cincinnati. He was a member of the New York City Bar Association, Sons of the American Revolution, the United Spanish War Veterans, the American Legion, the Military Order of Foreign Wars, the General Society of the War of 1812, Delta Upsilon, the Freemasons, the Union Club, the Seawanhaka Corinthian Yacht Club, the Harvard Club of New York, and the Down Town Association. He wrote several books and contributed a number of articles on insurance He was also a coach of the Crescent Athletic Club and a member of the Salmagundi Club and the Long Island Historical Society. In 1909, he married Eleanor Sherburne Whipple. Their children were Margary Pepperrell, Howland Bradford, Anna Bailey, Frances, and Dudley W.

Stoddard died at Doctors Hospital on October 11, 1957. He was buried at the Memorial Cemetery of Saint John's Church in Laurel Hollow.

New York State Assembly
Preceded by Artemas Ward Jr.	New York State Assembly; New York County, 25th District; 1912	Succeeded by David H. Knott
Preceded by David H. Knott	New York State Assembly; New York County, 25th District; 1914–1915	Succeeded by Robert McC. Marsh
