= David H. Knott =

American politician

David Hurst Knott (October 22, 1879 – May 4, 1954) was an American hotel executive and politician from New York.

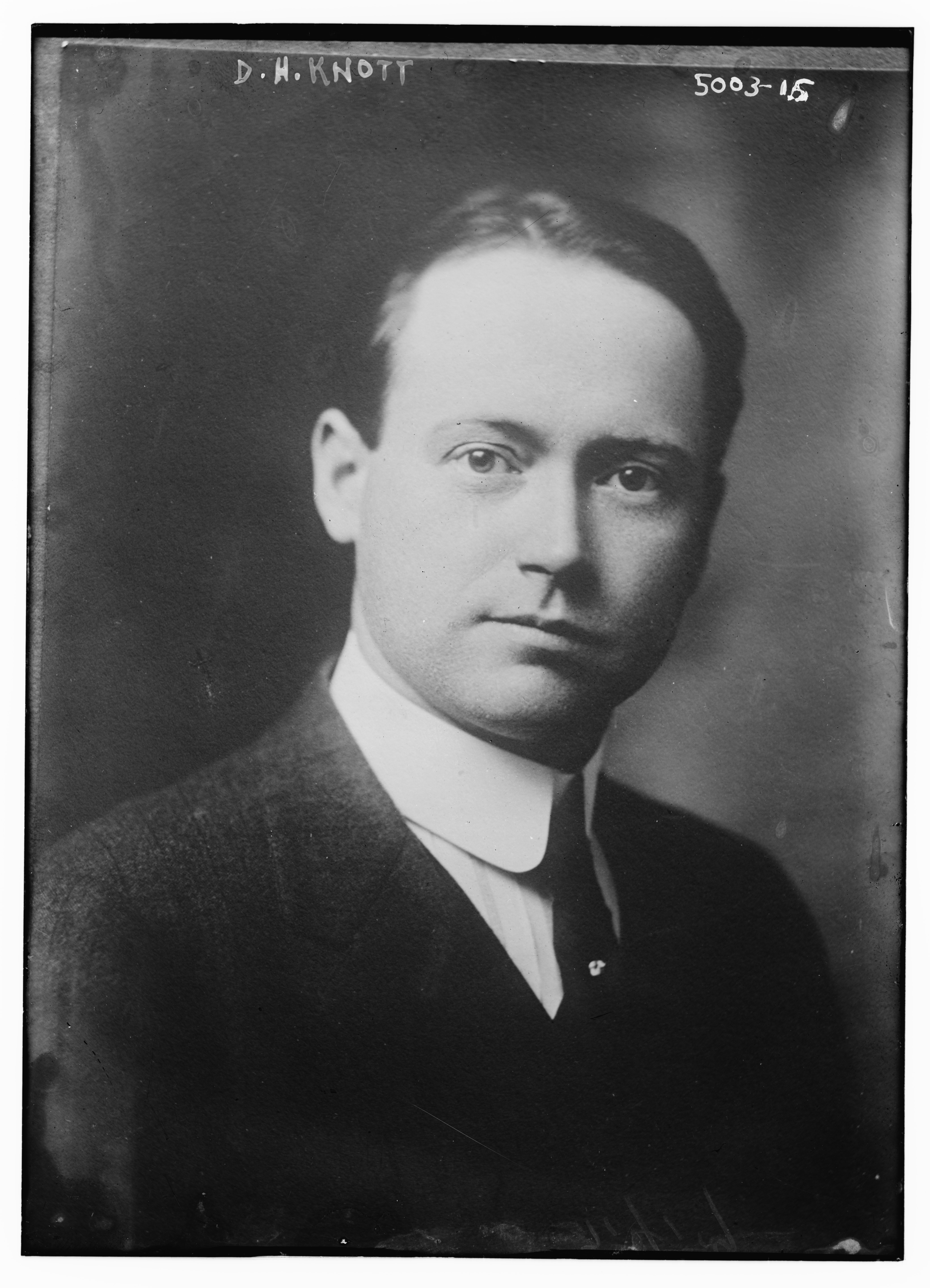

== Life ==
Knott was born on October 22, 1879, in Orange, New Jersey, the son of James Knott and Margaret MacMurray. He attended the Peddie Institute in Hightown. He moved to New York City with his family when he was two. He served in the 7th Regiment of the New York National Guard, and was in the National Guard during the Croton Dam strike.

Knott initially worked in the printing business, although he later worked as a room clerk in the Judson Hotel in Washington Square, which his father operated. In time, he became chairman of the Knott Hotels Corporation and came to own, lease, or manage around 35 hotels. Among the hotels he was involved with were the Shelton, the McAlpin, the Robert Treat, the Garden City Hotel, and the Lexington Hotel. He was also on the board of directors for the New York City Omnibus Corporation and the New York Board of Trade, and served on the advisory board of the Salvation Army. He was also a member of the Hotel Men's Association of New York City, the New York State Hotel Association, and the Hotel Men's Mutual Benevolent Association.

In 1912, Knott was elected to the New York State Assembly as a Democrat, representing the New York County 25th District. He served in the Assembly in 1913. He was an alternate delegate to the 1916, 1924, 1928, and 1932 Democratic National Conventions, and served as a delegate to the 1936 and 1952 Democratic National Conventions. In 1917, he was elected Sheriff of New York County, and served as Sheriff from 1918 to 1922. In the 1922 United States House of Representatives election, he unsuccessfully ran as the Democratic candidate in New York's 14th congressional district. In 1922, he was elected chairman of the New York County Democratic Party Committee. He was still serving as chairman when he died.

In 1934, Knott became a sachem of Tammany Hall. In 1942, he was elected Father of the Council of Sachems. He served as a presidential elector in the 1936, 1940 and 1944 United States presidential elections. In 1941, he was the Democratic candidate for New York City Comptroller, but he withdrew before the election.

In 1905, Knott married Agnes G. Geekie. Their children were James, David H., Jr., Robert, and Margery. David, a supervisor for Knott Hotels, enlisted in the Army in 1941 and was killed while fighting in Italy in March 1945. James served as president of Knott Hotels Corporation. After Agnes died in 1951, Knott married Daisy Gilchrest. He was a member of the Manhattan Club, the Piping Rock Club, the National Democratic Club, the Nassau Country Club, the New York Yacht Club, the New York Athletic Club, and the Iroquois Club. He was a Baptist.

Knott died in Doctors Hospital on May 4, 1954. He was buried in Woodlawn Cemetery.

New York State Assembly
Preceded by Francis R. Stoddard Jr.	New York State Assembly; New York County, 25th District; 1913	Succeeded by Francis R. Stoddard Jr.
