= Andrew J. Anderson =

American politician (1837–1916)

Member of the Wisconsin State Assembly
- In office 1877

Personal details
- Born: Andrew Johanessen Anderson; November 14, 1837 Lyngstad, Gran Municipality, Innlandet, Norway
- Died: January 17, 1916 (aged 78) Neligh, Nebraska, U.S.
- Party: Republican
- Spouse: Lucinda A. Million (m. 1862)
- Children: 4
- Occupation: Politician

Andrew Johanessen Anderson (November 14, 1837 – January 17, 1916) was an American politician who served as a member of the Wisconsin State Assembly.

Anderson was born in Lyngstad in Gran Municipality, Norway. He settled with his parents in the Town of Argyle, Wisconsin in 1851. There he became involved in business and farming. He married Lucinda A. Million (1841–1924) in 1862, and they had four children. He died in Neligh, Nebraska in 1916.

== Political career ==
Anderson was a member of the Assembly during the 1877 session. Other positions he held include chairman (similar to mayor) and town clerk of Argyle. He was a Republican.
