= United States Senate Armed Services Subcommittee on Airland =

Subcommittee within the U.S. Senate Armed Services Committee

The Senate Armed Services Subcommittee on Airland is one of seven subcommittees within the Senate Armed Services Committee.

== Jurisdiction ==
The Airland Subcommittee has primary jurisdiction over all issues related to the U.S. Army, U.S. Air Force, and U.S. Navy and Marine Corps tactical aviation programs; however, it does not include strategic forces, strategic airlift issues, and special operations programs. The subcommittee also oversees the Army and Air Force Reserves, and the National Guard.

== Members, 119th Congress ==
Majority	Minority
Kevin Cramer, North Dakota, Chair; Deb Fischer, Nebraska; Tom Cotton, Arkansas; Dan Sullivan, Alaska; Markwayne Mullin, Oklahoma; Ted Budd, North Carolina; Eric Schmitt, Missouri	Mark Kelly, Arizona, Ranking Member; Richard Blumenthal, Connecticut; Angus King, Maine; Gary Peters, Michigan; Tammy Duckworth, Illinois; Elissa Slotkin, Michigan
Ex officio
Roger Wicker, Mississippi	Jack Reed, Rhode Island

== Historical subcommittee rosters ==
=== 118th Congress ===
Majority	Minority
Mark Kelly, Arizona, Chair; Angus King, Maine; Gary Peters, Michigan; Joe Manchin, West Virginia; Tammy Duckworth, Illinois; Richard Blumenthal, Connecticut	Tom Cotton, Arkansas, Ranking Member; Deb Fischer, Nebraska; Joni Ernst, Iowa; Rick Scott, Florida; Markwayne Mullin, Oklahoma
Ex officio
Jack Reed, Rhode Island	Roger Wicker, Mississippi

=== 117th Congress ===
Majority	Minority
Tammy Duckworth, Illinois, Chair; Angus King, Maine; Gary Peters, Michigan; Joe Manchin, West Virginia; Mark Kelly, Arizona; Jacky Rosen, Nevada	Tom Cotton, Arkansas, Ranking Member; Roger Wicker, Mississippi; Thom Tillis, North Carolina; Dan Sullivan, Alaska; Rick Scott, Florida; Josh Hawley, Missouri
Ex officio
Jack Reed, Rhode Island	Jim Inhofe, Oklahoma

=== 116th Congress ===
Majority	Minority
Tom Cotton, Arkansas, Chairman; Roger Wicker, Mississippi; Thom Tillis, North Carolina; Dan Sullivan, Alaska; Kevin Cramer, North Dakota; Martha McSally, Arizona (until December 2, 2020); Tim Scott, South Carolina	Angus King, Maine Ranking Member; Richard Blumenthal, Connecticut; Elizabeth Warren, Massachusetts; Gary Peters, Michigan; Tammy Duckworth, Illinois; Doug Jones, Alabama
Ex officio
Jim Inhofe, Oklahoma	Jack Reed, Rhode Island

=== 115th Congress ===
Majority	Minority
Tom Cotton, Arkansas, Chairman; Roger Wicker, Mississippi; Thom Tillis, North Carolina; Dan Sullivan, Alaska; Ted Cruz, Texas; Ben Sasse, Nebraska; Jon Kyl, Arizona	Angus King, Maine Ranking Member; Claire McCaskill, Missouri; Richard Blumenthal, Connecticut; Joe Donnelly, Indiana; Elizabeth Warren, Massachusetts; Gary Peters, Michigan
Ex officio
Jim Inhofe, Oklahoma	Jack Reed, Rhode Island

== See also ==
- United States House Armed Services Subcommittee on Air and Land Forces
