= United States Senate Armed Services Subcommittee on Cybersecurity =

Golam Rabbi

The United States Senate Armed Services Subcommittee on Cybersecurity is one of seven subcommittees within the Senate Armed Services Committee.

== Jurisdiction ==
The Cybersecurity Subcommittee has primary jurisdiction over all policies and programs related to cyber forces and capabilities. The subcommittee also oversees the United States Cyber Command and the cyber components of other United States Department of Defense commands and agencies.

== Members, 119th Congress ==
Majority	Minority
Mike Rounds, South Dakota, Chair; Tom Cotton, Arkansas; Joni Ernst, Iowa; Ted Budd, North Carolina; Eric Schmitt, Missouri	Jacky Rosen, Nevada, Ranking Member; Kirsten Gillibrand, New York; Gary Peters, Michigan; Elissa Slotkin, Michigan
Ex officio
Roger Wicker, Mississippi	Jack Reed, Rhode Island

== Historical subcommittee rosters ==
=== 118th Congress ===
Majority	Minority
Joe Manchin, West Virginia, Chair; Kirsten Gillibrand, New York; Gary Peters, Michigan; Jacky Rosen, Nevada; Tammy Duckworth, Illinois	Mike Rounds, South Dakota, Ranking Member; Ted Budd, North Carolina; Joni Ernst, Iowa; Eric Schmitt, Missouri
Ex officio
Jack Reed, Rhode Island	Roger Wicker, Mississippi

=== 117th Congress ===
Majority	Minority
Joe Manchin, West Virginia, Chair; Kirsten Gillibrand, New York; Richard Blumenthal, Connecticut; Jacky Rosen, Nevada	Mike Rounds, South Dakota, Ranking Member; Roger Wicker, Mississippi; Joni Ernst, Iowa; Marsha Blackburn, Tennessee
Ex officio
Jack Reed, Rhode Island	Jim Inhofe, Oklahoma

=== 116th Congress ===
Majority	Minority
Mike Rounds, South Dakota, Chairman; Roger Wicker, Mississippi; David Perdue, Georgia; Tim Scott, South Carolina; Marsha Blackburn, Tennessee	Joe Manchin, West Virginia Ranking Member; Kirsten Gillibrand, New York; Richard Blumenthal, Connecticut; Martin Heinrich, New Mexico
Ex officio
Jim Inhofe, Oklahoma	Jack Reed, Rhode Island

=== 115th Congress ===
Majority	Minority
Mike Rounds, South Dakota, Chairman; Deb Fischer, Nebraska; David Perdue, Georgia; Lindsey Graham, South Carolina; Ben Sasse, Nebraska	Bill Nelson, Florida Ranking Member; Claire McCaskill, Missouri; Kirsten Gillibrand, New York; Richard Blumenthal, Connecticut
Ex officio
John McCain, Arizona	Jack Reed, Rhode Island
