= United States Senate Armed Services Subcommittee on Seapower =

Subcommittee within the U.S. Senate Armed Services Committee

The Senate Armed Services Subcommittee on Seapower is one of seven subcommittees within the Senate Armed Services Committee.

== Jurisdiction ==
The Seapower Subcommittee has jurisdiction over all U.S. Navy, U.S. Marine Corps, including non-tactical air programs, and the Naval Reserve forces.

== Members, 119th Congress ==
| Majority | Minority |
|---|---|
| Rick Scott, Florida, Chair; Dan Sullivan, Alaska; Tommy Tuberville, Alabama; Markwayne Mullin, Oklahoma; Jim Banks, Indiana; Tim Sheehy, Montana | Tim Kaine, Virginia, Ranking Member; Jeanne Shaheen, New Hampshire; Richard Blumenthal, Connecticut; Mazie Hirono, Hawaii; Angus King, Maine (Note: Angus King is an independent, but caucuses with the Democrats.) |
Ex officio
| Roger Wicker, Mississippi | Jack Reed, Rhode Island |

== Historical subcommittee rosters ==
=== 118th Congress ===
| Majority | Minority |
|---|---|
| Tim Kaine, Virginia, Chair; Jeanne Shaheen, New Hampshire; Richard Blumenthal, Connecticut; Angus King, Maine; Mazie Hirono, Hawaii; Gary Peters, Michigan | Kevin Cramer, North Dakota, Ranking Member; Rick Scott, Florida; Dan Sullivan, Alaska; Tommy Tuberville, Alabama; Eric Schmitt, Missouri |
Ex officio
| Jack Reed, Rhode Island | Roger Wicker, Mississippi |

=== 117th Congress ===
| Majority | Minority |
|---|---|
| Mazie Hirono, Hawaii, Chair; Jeanne Shaheen, New Hampshire; Richard Blumenthal, Connecticut; Angus King, Maine; Tim Kaine, Virginia; Gary Peters, Michigan | Kevin Cramer, North Dakota, Ranking Member; Roger Wicker, Mississippi; Tom Cotton, Arkansas; Thom Tillis, North Carolina; Rick Scott, Florida; Josh Hawley, Missouri |
Ex officio
| Jack Reed, Rhode Island | James Inhofe, Oklahoma |

=== 116th Congress ===
| Majority | Minority |
|---|---|
| David Perdue, Georgia, Chairman; Roger Wicker, Mississippi; Tom Cotton, Arkansas; Joni Ernst, Iowa; Thom Tillis, North Carolina; Josh Hawley, Missouri | Mazie Hirono, Hawaii, Ranking Member; Jeanne Shaheen, New Hampshire; Richard Blumenthal, Connecticut; Tim Kaine, Virginia; Angus King, Maine |
Ex officio
| James Inhofe, Oklahoma | Jack Reed, Rhode Island |

=== 115th Congress ===
| Majority | Minority |
|---|---|
| Roger Wicker, Mississippi, Chairman; Tom Cotton, Arkansas; Mike Rounds, South Dakota; Thom Tillis, North Carolina; Tim Scott, South Carolina; Jon Kyl, Arizona | Mazie Hirono, Hawaii, Ranking Member; Jeanne Shaheen, New Hampshire; Richard Blumenthal, Connecticut; Tim Kaine, Virginia; Angus King, Maine |
Ex officio
| James Inhofe, Oklahoma | Jack Reed, Rhode Island |

== See also ==
- U.S. House Armed Services Subcommittee on Seapower and Projection Forces
