= United States Senate Armed Services Subcommittee on Readiness and Management Support =

The Senate Armed Services Subcommittee on Readiness and Management Support is one of seven subcommittees within the Senate Armed Services Committee.

== Jurisdiction ==
The Readiness and Management Support subcommittee has oversight of military readiness, including training, logistics and maintenance, defense environmental programs, business operations and working capital funds, real property maintenance, military construction, Base Realignment and Closure, Armed Forces Retirement Home, readiness procurement and military depots, shipyards, ammunition plants, and arsenals.

== Members, 119th Congress ==
Majority	Minority
Dan Sullivan, Alaska, Chair; Deb Fischer, Nebraska; Kevin Cramer, North Dakota; Rick Scott, Florida; Eric Schmitt, Missouri; Tim Sheehy, Montana	Mazie Hirono, Hawaii, Ranking Member; Jeanne Shaheen, New Hampshire; Tim Kaine, Virginia; Elizabeth Warren, Massachusetts; Tammy Duckworth, Illinois
Ex officio
Roger Wicker, Mississippi	Jack Reed, Rhode Island

== Historical subcommittee rosters ==
=== 118th Congress ===
Majority	Minority
Mazie Hirono, Hawaii, Chair; Jeanne Shaheen, New Hampshire; Richard Blumenthal, Connecticut; Tim Kaine, Virginia; Tammy Duckworth, Illinois; Mark Kelly, Arizona	Dan Sullivan, Alaska, Ranking Member; Deb Fischer, Nebraska; Kevin Cramer, North Dakota; Tommy Tuberville, Alabama; Markwayne Mullin, Oklahoma
Ex officio
Jack Reed, Rhode Island	Roger Wicker, Mississippi

=== 117th Congress ===
Majority	Minority
Tim Kaine, Virginia, Chair; Jeanne Shaheen, New Hampshire; Richard Blumenthal, Connecticut; Mazie Hirono, Hawaii; Tammy Duckworth, Illinois	Dan Sullivan, Alaska, Ranking Member; Deb Fischer, Nebraska; Mike Rounds, South Dakota; Joni Ernst, Iowa; Marsha Blackburn, Tennessee
Ex officio
Jack Reed, Rhode Island	Jim Inhofe, Oklahoma

=== 116th Congress ===
Majority	Minority
Dan Sullivan, Alaska, Chairman; Deb Fischer, Nebraska; Joni Ernst, Iowa; David Perdue, Georgia; Marsha Blackburn, Tennessee; Martha McSally, Arizona (until December 2, 2020)	Tim Kaine, Virginia, Ranking Member; Jeanne Shaheen, New Hampshire; Mazie Hirono, Hawaii; Tammy Duckworth, Illinois; Doug Jones, Alabama
Ex officio
Jim Inhofe, Oklahoma	Jack Reed, Rhode Island

=== 115th Congress ===
Majority	Minority
Dan Sullivan, Alaska, Chairman; Mike Rounds, South Dakota; Joni Ernst, Iowa; David Perdue, Georgia	Tim Kaine, Virginia, Ranking Member; Jeanne Shaheen, New Hampshire; Mazie Hirono, Hawaii
Ex officio
Jim Inhofe, Oklahoma	Jack Reed, Rhode Island

== See also ==
U.S. House Armed Services Subcommittee on Readiness
