= United States Senate Committee on Armed Services =

Committee of the United States Senate

Senate Armed Services Committee
Standing committee
- Active United States Senate; 119th Congress

History
- Formed: January 2, 1947

Leadership
- Chair: Roger Wicker (R); Since January 3, 2025
- Ranking Member: Jack Reed (D); Since January 3, 2025

Structure
- Seats: 27 members
- Political parties: Majority (14): Republican (14); Minority (13): Democratic (12); Independent (1)

Jurisdiction
- Policy areas: Defense policy, military operations
- Oversight authority: Department of Defense, Armed Forces
- House counterpart: House Armed Services Committee

Website
- www.armed-services.senate.gov

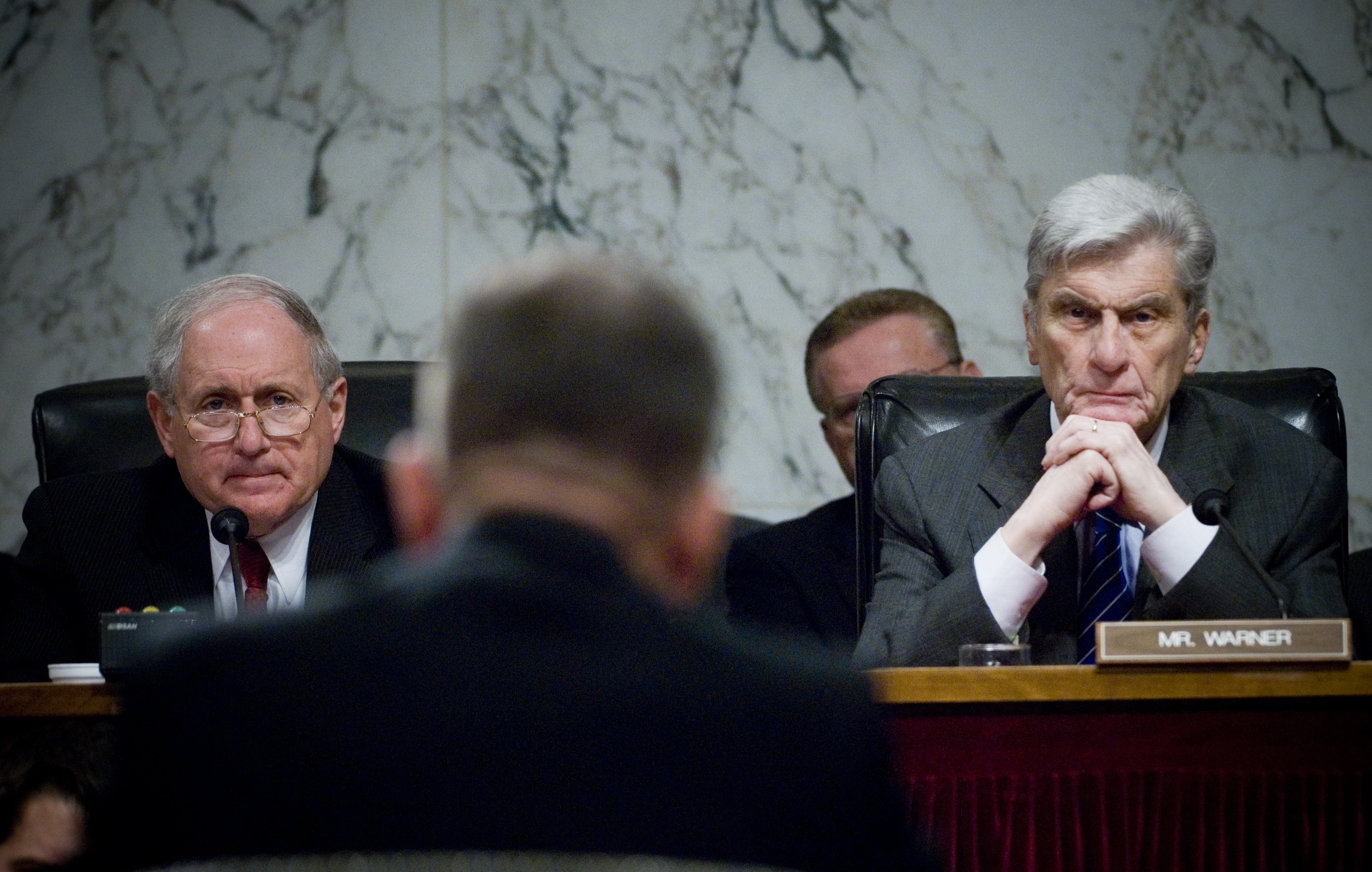
Chair Carl Levin (D-MI) and Ranking Member John Warner (R-VA) listen to Admiral Mike Mullen's confirmation hearing before the Armed Services Committee to become Chairman of the Joint Chiefs of Staff in July 2007; the Armed Services Committee is charged with overseeing the U.S. Senate's confirmation hearings for senior U.S. military.

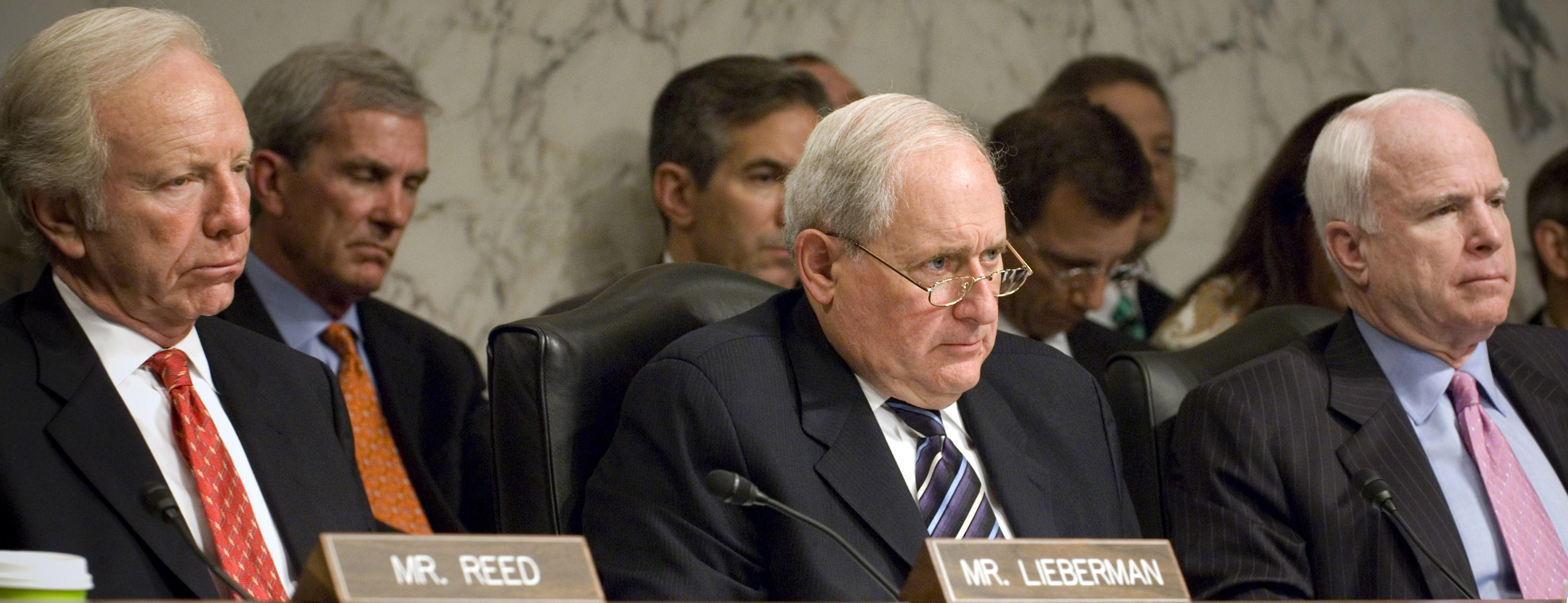
Armed Services Committee senators Joe Lieberman, Carl Levin (chair), and John McCain listen to Secretary of the Navy Ray Mabus deliver his opening remarks for the fiscal year 2010 budget request in June 2009.

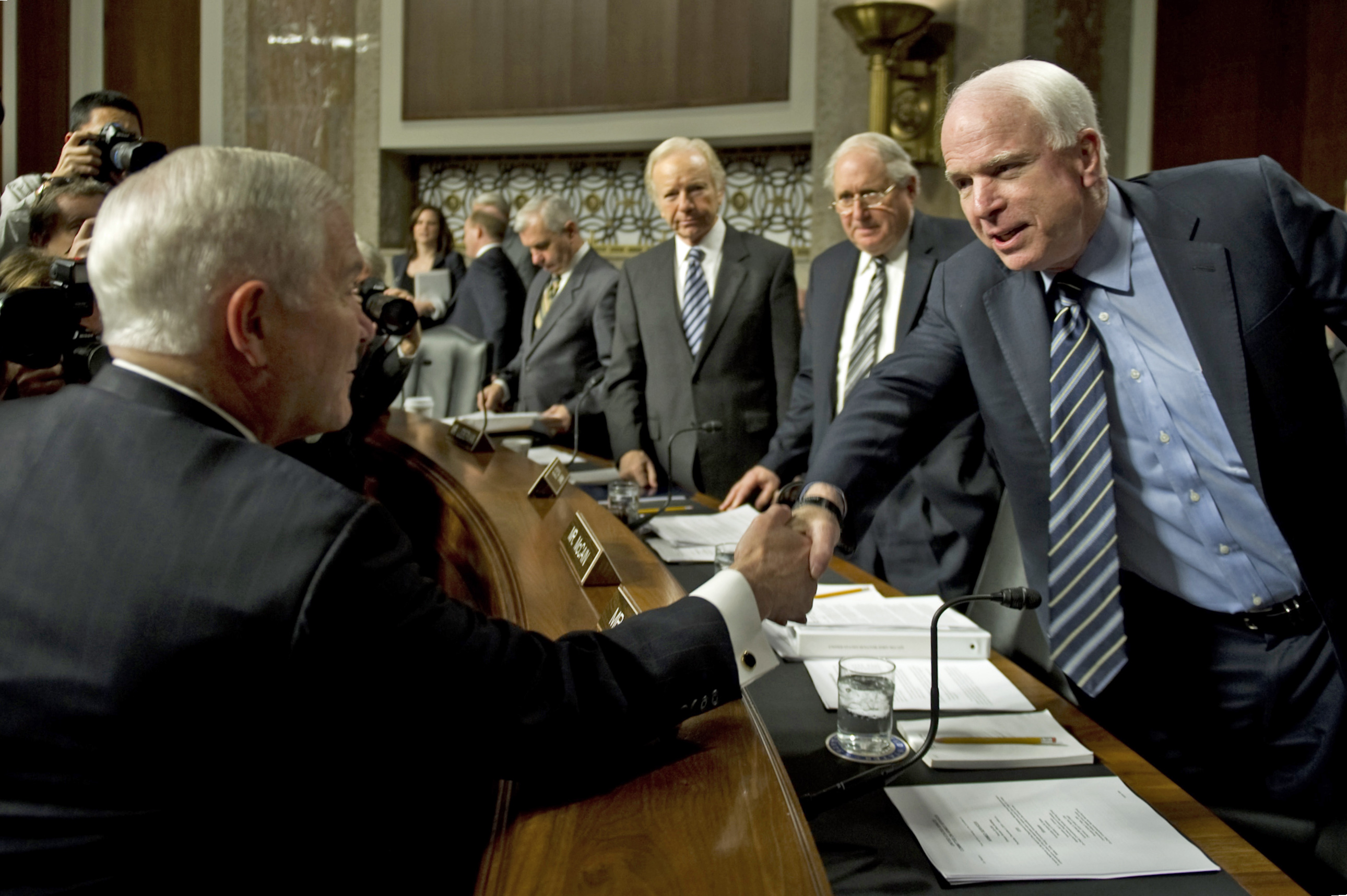
The committee's Don't Ask, Don't Tell hearing on December 2, 2010; U.S. Secretary of Defense Robert M. Gates greets Ranking Member, John McCain.

The Committee on Armed Services' hearing on sexual assault in the military on June 4, 2013

The Committee on Armed Services, sometimes abbreviated SASC for Senate Armed Services Committee, is a committee of the United States Senate empowered with legislative oversight of the nation's military, including the Department of Defense, military research and development, nuclear energy (as pertaining to national security), benefits for members of the military, the Selective Service System, and other matters related to defense policy. The Armed Services Committee was created as a result of the Legislative Reorganization Act of 1946 following the U.S. victory in World War II. The bill merged the responsibilities of the Committee on Naval Affairs, established in 1816, and the Committee on Military Affairs, also established in 1816.

Considered one of the most powerful Senate committees, its broad mandate allowed it to report some of the most extensive and revolutionary legislation during the Cold War years, including the National Security Act of 1947. The committee tends to take a more bipartisan approach than other committees, as many of its members formerly served in the military or have major defense interests located in the states they represent. The committee's regular legislative product is the National Defense Authorization Act (NDAA), which has been passed by Congress and signed into law annually since 1962.

The current chair is Republican Roger Wicker of Mississippi, and the ranking member is Democrat Jack Reed of Rhode Island.

== Jurisdiction ==
According to the Standing Rules of the United States Senate, all proposed legislation, messages, petitions, memorials, and other matters relating to the following subjects are referred to the Armed Services Committee:

1. Aeronautical and space activities pertaining to or primarily associated with the development of weapons systems or military operations.
2. Common defense.
3. Department of Defense, the Department of the Army, the Department of the Navy, and the Department of the Air Force, generally.
4. Maintenance and operation of the Panama Canal, including administration, sanitation, and government of the Canal Zone.
5. Military research and development.
6. National security aspects of nuclear energy.
7. Naval petroleum reserves, except those in Alaska.
8. Pay, promotion, retirement, and other benefits and privileges of members of the Armed Forces, including overseas education of civilian and military dependents.
9. Selective service system.
10. Strategic and critical materials necessary for the common defense.

== Members, 119th Congress ==
Majority	Minority
Roger Wicker, Mississippi, Chair; Deb Fischer, Nebraska; Tom Cotton, Arkansas; Mike Rounds, South Dakota; Joni Ernst, Iowa; Dan Sullivan, Alaska; Kevin Cramer, North Dakota; Rick Scott, Florida; Tommy Tuberville, Alabama; Ted Budd, North Carolina; Eric Schmitt, Missouri; Jim Banks, Indiana; Tim Sheehy, Montana; Ashley Moody, Florida	Jack Reed, Rhode Island, Ranking Member; Jeanne Shaheen, New Hampshire; Kirsten Gillibrand, New York; Richard Blumenthal, Connecticut; Mazie Hirono, Hawaii; Tim Kaine, Virginia; Angus King, Maine; Elizabeth Warren, Massachusetts; Gary Peters, Michigan; Tammy Duckworth, Illinois; Jacky Rosen, Nevada; Mark Kelly, Arizona; Elissa Slotkin, Michigan

== Subcommittees ==
Subcommittee Name	Chair	Ranking Member
Airland	Kevin Cramer (R-ND)	Mark Kelly (D-AZ)
Cybersecurity	Mike Rounds (R-SD)	Jacky Rosen (D-NV)
Emerging Threats and Capabilities	Joni Ernst (R-IA)	Elissa Slotkin (D-MI)
Personnel	Tommy Tuberville (R-AL)	Elizabeth Warren (D-MA)
Readiness and Management Support	Dan Sullivan (R-AK)	Mazie Hirono (D-HI)
Seapower	Rick Scott (R-FL)	Tim Kaine (D-VA)
Strategic Forces	Deb Fischer (R-NE)	Angus King (I-ME)

== Leadership ==
=== Committee on Military Affairs, 1816–1947 ===
Name	Party	State	Start	End
John Williams	Democratic-Republican	Tennessee	1816	1817
George Troup	Democratic-Republican	Georgia	1817	1818
John Williams	Democratic-Republican	Tennessee	1818	1823
Andrew Jackson	Jackson Democratic-Republican	Tennessee	1823	1825
William Harrison	Adams Republican	Ohio	1825	1828
Thomas Benton	Jacksonian (1828–1837)	Missouri	1828	1841
Thomas Benton	Democratic (1837–1841)	Missouri	1828	1841
William Preston	Whig	South Carolina	1841	1842
John Crittenden	Whig	Kentucky	1842	1845
Thomas Benton	Democratic	Missouri	1845	1849
Jefferson Davis	Democratic	Mississippi	1849	1851
James Shields	Democratic	Illinois	1851	1855
John Weller	Democratic	California	1855	1857
Jefferson Davis	Democratic	Mississippi	1857	1861
Robert Johnson	Democratic	Arkansas	1861	
Henry Wilson	Republican	Massachusetts	1861	1872
John Logan	Republican	Illinois	1872	1877
George Spencer	Republican	Alabama	1877	1879
Theodore Randolph	Democratic	New Jersey	1879	1881
John Logan	Republican	Illinois	1881	1886
Joseph Hawley	Republican	Connecticut	1887	1893
Edward Walthall	Democratic	Mississippi	1893	1894
Joseph Hawley	Republican	Connecticut	1894	1905
Francis Warren	Republican	Wyoming	1905	1911
Henry du Pont	Republican	Delaware	1911	1913
Joseph Johnston	Democratic	Alabama	1913	
George Chamberlain	Democratic	Oregon	1913	1919
James Wadsworth	Republican	New York	1919	1927
David Reed	Republican	Pennsylvania	1927	1933
Morris Sheppard	Democratic	Texas	1933	1941
Robert Reynolds	Democratic	North Carolina	1942	1945
Elbert Thomas	Democratic	Utah	1945	1947

=== Committee on Naval Affairs, 1816–1947 ===
Name	Party	State	Start	End
Charles Tait	Democratic-Republican	Georgia	1816	1818
Nathan Sanford	Democratic-Republican	New York	1818	1819
James Pleasants	Democratic-Republican	Virginia	1819	1823
James Lloyd	Adams-Clay Federalist	Massachusetts	1823	1825
Robert Hayne	Jacksonian	South Carolina	1825	1832
George Dallas	Jacksonian	Pennsylvania	1832	1833
Samuel Southard	Anti-Jackson	New Jersey	1833	1836
William Rives	Jacksonian (1836–1837)	Virginia	1836	1839
William Rives	Democratic (1837–1839)	Virginia	1836	1839
Reuel Williams	Democratic	Maine	1839	1841
Willie Mangum	Whig	North Carolina	1841	1842
Richard Bayard	Whig	Delaware	1842	1845
John Fairfield	Democratic	Maine	1845	1847
David Yulee	Democratic	Florida	1847	1851
William Gwin	Democratic	California	1851	1855
Stephen Mallory	Democratic	Florida	1855	1861
John Thomson	Democratic	New Jersey	1861	
John Hale	Republican	New Hampshire	1861	1864
James Grimes	Republican	Iowa	1864	1870
Aaron Cragin	Republican	New Hampshire	1870	1877
Aaron Sargent	Republican	California	1877	1879
John McPherson	Democratic	New Jersey	1879	1881
James Cameron	Republican	Pennsylvania	1881	1893
John McPherson	Democratic	New Jersey	1893	1895
James Cameron	Republican	Pennsylvania	1895	1897
Eugene Hale	Republican	Maine	1897	1909
George Perkins	Republican	California	1909	1913
Benjamin Tillman	Democratic	South Carolina	1913	1918
Claude Swanson	Democratic	Virginia	1918	1919
Carroll Page	Republican	Vermont	1919	1923
Frederick Hale	Republican	Maine	1923	1933
Park Trammell	Democratic	Florida	1933	1937
David Walsh	Democratic	Massachusetts	1937	1947

=== Committee on Armed Services, 1947–present ===
Denotes acting capacity.

Chairs
Name	Party	State	Start	End
Chan Gurney	Republican	South Dakota	1947	1949
Millard Tydings	Democratic	Maryland	1949	1951
Richard Russell	Democratic	Georgia	1951	1953
Leverett Saltonstall	Republican	Massachusetts	1953	1955
Richard Russell	Democratic	Georgia	1955	1969
John Stennis	Democratic	Mississippi	1969	1981
John Tower	Republican	Texas	1981	1985
Barry Goldwater	Republican	Arizona	1985	1987
Sam Nunn	Democratic	Georgia	1987	1995
Strom Thurmond	Republican	South Carolina	1995	1999
John Warner	Republican	Virginia	1999	2001
Carl Levin	Democratic	Michigan	2001	
John Warner	Republican	Virginia	2001	
Carl Levin	Democratic	Michigan	2001	2003
John Warner	Republican	Virginia	2003	2007
Carl Levin	Democratic	Michigan	2007	2015
John McCain	Republican	Arizona	2015	2018
Jim Inhofe	Republican	Oklahoma	2017	2018
Jim Inhofe	Republican	Oklahoma	2018	2021
Jack Reed	Democratic	Rhode Island	2021	2025
Roger Wicker	Republican	Mississippi	2025	present

Ranking members
Name	Party	State	Start	End
Millard Tydings	Democratic	Maryland	1947	1949
Styles Bridges	Republican	New Hampshire	1949	1953
Richard Russell	Democratic	Georgia	1953	1955
Styles Bridges	Republican	New Hampshire	1955	1963
Leverett Saltonstall	Republican	Massachusetts	1963	1967
Margaret Smith	Republican	Maine	1967	1973
Strom Thurmond	Republican	South Carolina	1973	1977
John Tower	Republican	Texas	1977	1981
John Stennis	Democratic	Mississippi	1981	1983
Scoop Jackson	Democratic	Washington	1983	
Sam Nunn	Democratic	Georgia	1983	1987
John Warner	Republican	Virginia	1987	1993
Strom Thurmond	Republican	South Carolina	1993	1995
Sam Nunn	Democratic	Georgia	1995	1997
Carl Levin	Democratic	Michigan	1997	2001
John Warner	Republican	Virginia	2001	2003
Carl Levin	Democratic	Michigan	2003	2007
John McCain	Republican	Arizona	2007	2015
Jim Inhofe	Republican	Oklahoma	2013	2015
Jack Reed	Democratic	Rhode Island	2015	2021
Jim Inhofe	Republican	Oklahoma	2021	2023
Roger Wicker	Republican	Mississippi	2023	2025
Jack Reed	Democratic	Rhode Island	2025	present

== Historical committee rosters ==
=== 111th Congress ===
Majority	Minority
Carl Levin, Michigan, Chair; Joseph Lieberman, Connecticut; Jack Reed, Rhode Island; Daniel Akaka, Hawaii; Bill Nelson, Florida; Ben Nelson, Nebraska; Evan Bayh, Indiana; Jim Webb, Virginia; Claire McCaskill, Missouri; Mark Udall, Colorado; Kay Hagan, North Carolina; Mark Begich, Alaska; Roland Burris, Illinois, until November 2010; Jeff Bingaman, New Mexico; Ted Kaufman, Delaware, until November 2010; Carte Goodwin, West Virginia, until November 2010; Joe Manchin, West Virginia, from November 2010; Chris Coons, Delaware, from November 2010	John McCain, Arizona, Ranking Member; James Inhofe, Oklahoma; Jeff Sessions, Alabama; Saxby Chambliss, Georgia; Lindsey Graham, South Carolina; John Thune, South Dakota; Roger Wicker, Mississippi; George LeMieux, Florida; Scott Brown, Massachusetts; Richard Burr, North Carolina; David Vitter, Louisiana; Susan Collins, Maine

Source: 2010 Congressional Record, Vol. 156, Page S6226

Subcommittees

Subcommittee	Chair	Ranking Minority Member
Airland	Joe Lieberman (I-CT)	John Thune (R-SD)
Emerging Threats and Capabilities	Bill Nelson (D-FL)	George LeMieux (R-FL)
Personnel	Jim Webb (D-VA)	Lindsey Graham (R-SC)
Readiness and Management Support	Evan Bayh (D-IN)	Richard Burr (R-NC)
SeaPower	Jack Reed (D-RI)	Roger Wicker (R-MS)
Strategic Forces	Ben Nelson (D-NE)	David Vitter (R-LA)

=== 112th Congress ===
Majority	Minority
Carl Levin, Michigan, Chair; Joseph Lieberman, Connecticut; Jack Reed, Rhode Island; Daniel Akaka, Hawaii; Ben Nelson, Nebraska; Jim Webb, Virginia; Claire McCaskill, Missouri; Mark Udall, Colorado; Kay Hagan, North Carolina; Mark Begich, Alaska; Joe Manchin, West Virginia; Jeanne Shaheen, New Hampshire; Kirsten Gillibrand, New York; Richard Blumenthal, Connecticut	John McCain, Arizona, Ranking Member; James Inhofe, Oklahoma; Jeff Sessions, Alabama; Saxby Chambliss, Georgia; Roger Wicker, Mississippi; Scott Brown, Massachusetts; Rob Portman, Ohio; Kelly Ayotte, New Hampshire; Susan Collins, Maine; Lindsey Graham, South Carolina; John Cornyn, Texas; David Vitter, Louisiana

Source: 2011 Congressional Record, Vol. 157, Page S557

Subcommittees

Subcommittee	Chair	Ranking Member
Airland	Joe Lieberman (I-CT)	Scott Brown (R-MA)
Emerging Threats and Capabilities	Kay Hagan (D-NC)	Rob Portman (R-OH)
Personnel	Jim Webb (D-VA)	Lindsey Graham (R-SC)
Readiness and Management Support	Claire McCaskill (D-MO)	Kelly Ayotte (R-NH)
Seapower	Jack Reed (D-RI)	Roger Wicker (R-MS)
Strategic Forces	Ben Nelson (D-NE)	Jeff Sessions (R-AL)

=== 113th Congress ===
Majority	Minority
Carl Levin, Michigan, Chair; Jack Reed, Rhode Island; Bill Nelson, Florida; Claire McCaskill, Missouri; Mark Udall, Colorado; Kay Hagan, North Carolina; Joe Manchin, West Virginia; Jeanne Shaheen, New Hampshire; Kirsten Gillibrand, New York; Richard Blumenthal, Connecticut; Joe Donnelly, Indiana; Mazie Hirono, Hawaii; Tim Kaine, Virginia; Angus King, Maine	James Inhofe, Oklahoma, Ranking Member; John McCain, Arizona; Jeff Sessions, Alabama; Saxby Chambliss, Georgia; Roger Wicker, Mississippi; Kelly Ayotte, New Hampshire; Deb Fischer, Nebraska; Lindsey Graham, South Carolina; David Vitter, Louisiana; Roy Blunt, Missouri; Mike Lee, Utah; Ted Cruz, Texas

Source: 2013 Congressional Record, Vol. 159, Page S296

Subcommittees

Subcommittee	Chair	Ranking Member
Airland	Joe Manchin (D-WV)	Roger Wicker (R-MS)
Emerging Threats and Capabilities	Kay Hagan (D-NC)	Deb Fischer (R-NE)
Personnel	Kirsten Gillibrand (D-NY)	Lindsey Graham (R-SC)
Readiness and Management Support	Jeanne Shaheen (D-NH)	Kelly Ayotte (R-NH)
Seapower	Jack Reed (D-RI)	John McCain (R-AZ)
Strategic Forces	Mark Udall (D-CO)	Jeff Sessions (R-AL)

=== 114th Congress ===
Majority	Minority
John McCain, Arizona, Chair; Jim Inhofe, Oklahoma; Jeff Sessions, Alabama; Roger Wicker, Mississippi; Kelly Ayotte, New Hampshire; Deb Fischer, Nebraska; Tom Cotton, Arkansas; Mike Rounds, South Dakota; Joni Ernst, Iowa; Thom Tillis, North Carolina; Dan Sullivan, Alaska; Mike Lee, Utah; Lindsey Graham, South Carolina; Ted Cruz, Texas	Jack Reed, Rhode Island, Ranking Member; Bill Nelson, Florida; Claire McCaskill, Missouri; Joe Manchin, West Virginia; Jeanne Shaheen, New Hampshire; Kirsten Gillibrand, New York; Richard Blumenthal, Connecticut; Joe Donnelly, Indiana; Mazie Hirono, Hawaii; Tim Kaine, Virginia; Angus King, Maine; Martin Heinrich, New Mexico

Subcommittee	Chair	Ranking Member
Airland	Tom Cotton (R-AR)	Joe Manchin (D-WV)
Emerging Threats and Capabilities	Deb Fischer (R-NE)	Bill Nelson (D-FL)
Personnel	Lindsey Graham (R-SC)	Kirsten Gillibrand (D-NY)
Readiness and Management Support	Kelly Ayotte (R-NH)	Tim Kaine (D-VA)
Seapower	Roger Wicker (R-MS)	Mazie Hirono (D-HI)
Strategic Forces	Jeff Sessions (R-AL)	Joe Donnelly (D-IN)

=== 115th Congress ===
Majority	Minority
Jim Inhofe, Oklahoma, Chair (from September 6, 2018); John McCain, Arizona, Chair (until August 25, 2018); Roger Wicker, Mississippi; Deb Fischer, Nebraska; Tom Cotton, Arkansas; Mike Rounds, South Dakota; Joni Ernst, Iowa; Thom Tillis, North Carolina; Dan Sullivan, Alaska; David Perdue, Georgia; Ted Cruz, Texas; Lindsey Graham, South Carolina; Ben Sasse, Nebraska; Tim Scott, South Carolina; Jon Kyl, Arizona (from September 6, 2018)	Jack Reed, Rhode Island, Ranking Member; Bill Nelson, Florida; Claire McCaskill, Missouri; Jeanne Shaheen, New Hampshire; Kirsten Gillibrand, New York; Richard Blumenthal, Connecticut; Joe Donnelly, Indiana; Mazie Hirono, Hawaii; Tim Kaine, Virginia; Angus King, Maine; Martin Heinrich, New Mexico; Elizabeth Warren, Massachusetts; Gary Peters, Michigan

=== 116th Congress ===
Majority	Minority
Jim Inhofe, Oklahoma, Chair; Roger Wicker, Mississippi; Deb Fischer, Nebraska; Tom Cotton, Arkansas; Mike Rounds, South Dakota; Joni Ernst, Iowa; Thom Tillis, North Carolina; Dan Sullivan, Alaska; David Perdue, Georgia; Kevin Cramer, North Dakota; Martha McSally, Arizona (until December 2, 2020); Rick Scott, Florida; Marsha Blackburn, Tennessee; Josh Hawley, Missouri	Jack Reed, Rhode Island, Ranking Member; Jeanne Shaheen, New Hampshire; Kirsten Gillibrand, New York; Richard Blumenthal, Connecticut; Mazie Hirono, Hawaii; Tim Kaine, Virginia; Angus King, Maine; Martin Heinrich, New Mexico; Elizabeth Warren, Massachusetts; Gary Peters, Michigan; Joe Manchin, West Virginia; Tammy Duckworth, Illinois; Doug Jones, Alabama

=== 117th Congress ===
Majority	Minority
Jack Reed, Rhode Island, Chair; Jeanne Shaheen, New Hampshire; Kirsten Gillibrand, New York; Richard Blumenthal, Connecticut; Mazie Hirono, Hawaii; Tim Kaine, Virginia; Angus King, Maine; Elizabeth Warren, Massachusetts; Gary Peters, Michigan; Joe Manchin, West Virginia; Tammy Duckworth, Illinois; Jacky Rosen, Nevada; Mark Kelly, Arizona	Jim Inhofe, Oklahoma, Ranking Member; Roger Wicker, Mississippi; Deb Fischer, Nebraska; Tom Cotton, Arkansas; Mike Rounds, South Dakota; Joni Ernst, Iowa; Thom Tillis, North Carolina; Dan Sullivan, Alaska; Kevin Cramer, North Dakota; Rick Scott, Florida; Marsha Blackburn, Tennessee; Josh Hawley, Missouri; Tommy Tuberville, Alabama

=== 118th Congress ===
Majority	Minority
Jack Reed, Rhode Island, Chair; Jeanne Shaheen, New Hampshire; Kirsten Gillibrand, New York; Richard Blumenthal, Connecticut; Mazie Hirono, Hawaii; Tim Kaine, Virginia; Angus King, Maine; Elizabeth Warren, Massachusetts; Gary Peters, Michigan; Joe Manchin, West Virginia; Tammy Duckworth, Illinois; Jacky Rosen, Nevada; Mark Kelly, Arizona	Roger Wicker, Mississippi, Ranking Member; Deb Fischer, Nebraska; Tom Cotton, Arkansas; Mike Rounds, South Dakota; Joni Ernst, Iowa; Dan Sullivan, Alaska; Kevin Cramer, North Dakota; Rick Scott, Florida; Tommy Tuberville, Alabama; Markwayne Mullin, Oklahoma; Ted Budd, North Carolina; Eric Schmitt, Missouri

== See also ==
- United States House Committee on Armed Services
- List of United States Senate committees
