= United States Senate Armed Services Subcommittee on Strategic Forces =

Subcommittee within the Senate Armed Services Committee

The Senate Armed Services Subcommittee on Strategic Forces is one of seven subcommittees within the Senate Armed Services Committee.

== Jurisdiction ==
The Strategic Forces Subcommittee has jurisdiction over strategic forces, nuclear weapons, national defense and nuclear deterrence, space programs, and ballistic missile defense.

== Members, 119th Congress ==
Majority	Minority
Deb Fischer, Nebraska, Ranking Member; Tom Cotton, Arkansas; Mike Rounds, South Dakota; Kevin Cramer, North Dakota; Tommy Tuberville, Alabama; Jim Banks, Indiana	Angus King, Maine, Chair; Kirsten Gillibrand, New York; Elizabeth Warren, Massachusetts; Jacky Rosen, Nevada; Mark Kelly, Arizona
Ex officio
Roger Wicker, Mississippi	Jack Reed, Rhode Island

== Historical subcommittee rosters ==
=== 118th Congress ===
Majority	Minority
Angus King, Maine, Chair; Elizabeth Warren, Massachusetts; Joe Manchin, West Virginia; Kirsten Gillibrand, New York; Jacky Rosen, Nevada; Mark Kelly, Arizona	Deb Fischer, Nebraska, Ranking Member; Tom Cotton, Arkansas; Mike Rounds, South Dakota; Kevin Cramer, North Dakota; Tommy Tuberville, Alabama
Ex officio
Jack Reed, Rhode Island	Roger Wicker, Mississippi

=== 117th Congress ===
Majority	Minority
Angus King, Maine, Chair; Elizabeth Warren, Massachusetts; Joe Manchin, West Virginia; Tammy Duckworth, Illinois; Jacky Rosen, Nevada; Mark Kelly, Arizona	Deb Fischer, Nebraska, Ranking Member; Tom Cotton, Arkansas; Mike Rounds, South Dakota; Dan Sullivan, Alaska; Kevin Cramer, North Dakota; Tommy Tuberville, Alabama
Ex officio
Jack Reed, Rhode Island	Jim Inhofe, Oklahoma

=== 116th Congress ===
Majority	Minority
Deb Fischer, Nebraska, Chairwoman; Tom Cotton, Arkansas; Mike Rounds, South Dakota; Dan Sullivan, Alaska; Kevin Cramer, North Dakota; Josh Hawley, Missouri	Martin Heinrich, New Mexico, Ranking Member; Angus King, Maine; Elizabeth Warren, Massachusetts; Joe Manchin, West Virginia; Doug Jones, Alabama
Ex officio
Jim Inhofe, Oklahoma	Jack Reed, Rhode Island

=== 115th Congress ===
Majority	Minority
Deb Fischer, Nebraska, Chairwoman; Tom Cotton, Arkansas; Dan Sullivan, Alaska; Ted Cruz, Texas; Lindsey Graham, South Carolina; Jon Kyl, Arizona	Joe Donnelly, Indiana, Ranking Member; Martin Heinrich, New Mexico; Elizabeth Warren, Massachusetts; Gary Peters, Michigan
Ex officio
Jim Inhofe, Oklahoma	Jack Reed, Rhode Island

== See also ==
U.S. House Armed Services Subcommittee on Strategic Forces
