= Tim Sheehy =

American politician and businessman (born 1985)

- Official portrait, 2025

United States Senator from Montana
- Incumbent
- Assumed office January 3, 2025 Serving with Steve Daines
- Preceded by: Jon Tester

Personal details
- Born: Timothy Patrick Sheehy; November 18, 1985 (age 40) Ramsey, Minnesota, U.S.
- Party: Republican
- Spouse: Carmen Sheehy
- Children: 4
- Education: United States Naval Academy (BS)
- Website: Senate website; Campaign website

Military service
- Branch/service: United States Navy
- Years of service: 2008–2019
- Rank: Lieutenant
- Unit: U.S. Navy SEALs
- Battles/wars: War in Afghanistan
- Awards: Bronze Star; Purple Heart

Timothy Patrick Sheehy (/ʃiːhi/ SHEE-hee; born November 18, 1985) is an American politician and businessman serving since 2025 as the junior United States senator from Montana. A member of the Republican Party, he is the youngest Republican U.S. senator and the second-youngest U.S. senator, after Jon Ossoff.

In 2014, Sheehy founded Bridger Aerospace, an aerial firefighting and wildfire management company. In 2024, he defeated three-term Democratic incumbent senator Jon Tester. Sheehy is set to become Montana's senior senator when Steve Daines leaves office in 2027, and to be the co-dean of Montana's congressional delegations, alongside Troy Downing.

== Early life and education ==
Sheehy was born in Ramsey, Minnesota, in the Minneapolis–Saint Paul area, and grew up in a house on Turtle Lake in Shoreview, Minnesota. He attended St. Paul Academy, graduating in 2004. He graduated from the U.S. Naval Academy with a bachelor's degree in history in 2008. He was a Navy SEAL. He later attended Army Ranger School.

== Military Service (2008-2019) ==
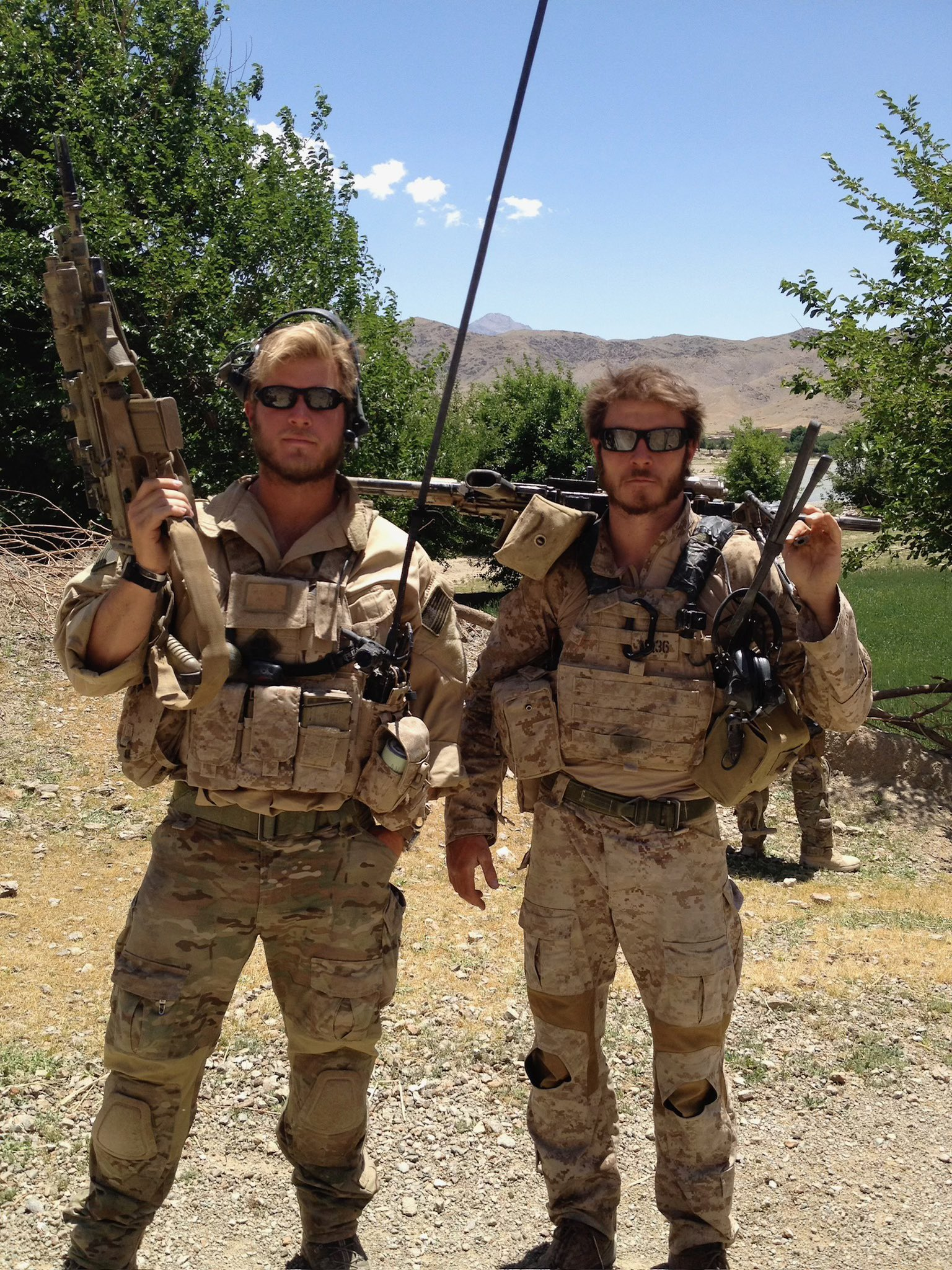
Sheehy (left) while serving in the U.S. Navy SEALs

During his military career, Sheehy did tours of duty in Iraq, Afghanistan, South America, and the Pacific region.

In 2015, a park ranger cited Sheehy for discharging a firearm in Glacier National Park. Sheehy wrote in a statement, "while reloading our vehicle an improperly placed firearm kept in the vehicle for bear protection fell out and discharged into my right forearm." But in his 2023 memoir, he wrote that a bullet had lodged in his arm during a 2012 Afghanistan firefight. Sheehy told The Washington Post that he "made up the story about the gun going off to protect himself and his former platoonmates from facing a potential military investigation into an old bullet wound that he said he got in Afghanistan in 2012." He said he did not report the incident at the time to protect his unit's members because he suspected it was from friendly fire. In 2015, Sheehy was awarded a Bronze Star with valor and a Purple Heart. Montana Congressman Ryan Zinke performed the ceremonial pinning of the medals. Sheehy has said that questioning whether he was shot in Afghanistan is "tantamount to falsely accusing him of stolen valor", but has declined to release his medical records and said there are no records showing he was shot in Afghanistan.

Sheehy left active duty in 2014 and was discharged from the Navy Individual Ready Reserve (IRR) in 2019. He wrote in his memoir and in a resume submitted to the Montana State Legislature that he had been medically discharged due to wounds received in Afghanistan. In October 2024, an NBC News review of Sheehy's discharge paperwork found that Sheehy voluntarily resigned from commission, contradicting his claims that he was discharged from the military because of injuries he sustained on duty.

== Career (2014-2025) ==
=== Business ===
In 2014, Sheehy founded the company Bridger Aerospace. Headquartered in Belgrade, Montana, it has provided aerial firefighting services in 24 states and two Canadian provinces. Upon founding the company, Sheehy was its only pilot, operating one plane and assisting ranchers with tracking cattle. In 2024, Sheehy resigned as Bridger's CEO to focus on his Senate campaign. The company was facing a dire financial situation: it had lost $77.4 million in 2023 and $20.1 million in the first four months of 2024.

In 2015 Sheehy spun off a portion of Bridger Aerospace that develops aerial surveillance and imaging systems to form Ascent Vision Technologies (AVT). The company specializes in jamming enemy drones, for the ultimate goal of shooting them down. AVT's technology was used to shoot down an Iranian drone in 2019. In 2020, AVT was acquired by CACI International for $350 million, netting Sheehy $75 million. In 2024, two former employees sued Sheehy, his brother, and their company Bridger Management, alleging that the Sheehys forced the two to sell off stock before the acquisition, which would have been worth about $3 million after the sale.

In 2020, Sheehy co-founded the Little Belt Cattle Company with Greg Putnam, another former Navy SEAL, who runs the day-to-day operations of the nearly 20,000-acre working cattle ranch, which borders over 500,000 acres of national forest. The company manages its own supply chain of sustainably raised Montana beef. In 2021, Sheehy received the nonprofit Montana Land Reliance's Conservation Award for "working to ensure the ranch 'will remain scenic and open space in perpetuity.'"

=== Book ===
In 2023, Sheehy published a memoir, Mudslingers: A True Story of Aerial Firefighting. The Daily Montanan accused him of plagiarism in the book, giving four examples, the briefest a 27-word passage from Wikipedia. The memoir was not vetted by the U.S. Department of Defense Prepublication and Security Review (DOPSR) as required.

== U.S. Senate (2025-present) ==
=== 2024 election ===
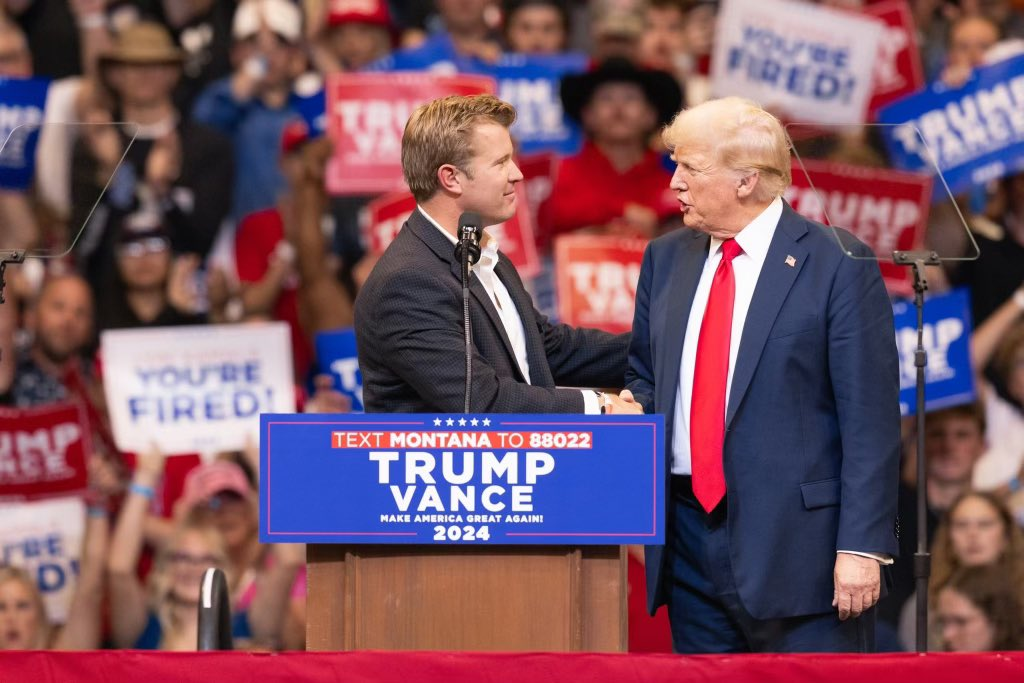
Sheehy campaigning alongside President Donald Trump in Montana

In June 2023, Sheehy announced he would run as a Republican against three-term Democratic incumbent Jon Tester in the 2024 United States Senate election in Montana. Republicans targeted the Montana election to gain a majority in the Senate.

The election was notable as the most expensive in U.S. history on a per-voter basis, with spending estimated at $487 per registered voter, mostly attributed to out-of-state "dark money" groups. Sheehy was among the personally wealthiest candidates running for Senate. He received $8 million from Blackstone Inc. CEO Stephen Schwarzman and about $47 million from at least 63 other billionaires and 37 of their immediate family members. Tester raised and spent significantly more money than Sheehy. Sheehy won the election with 52.6% of the vote.

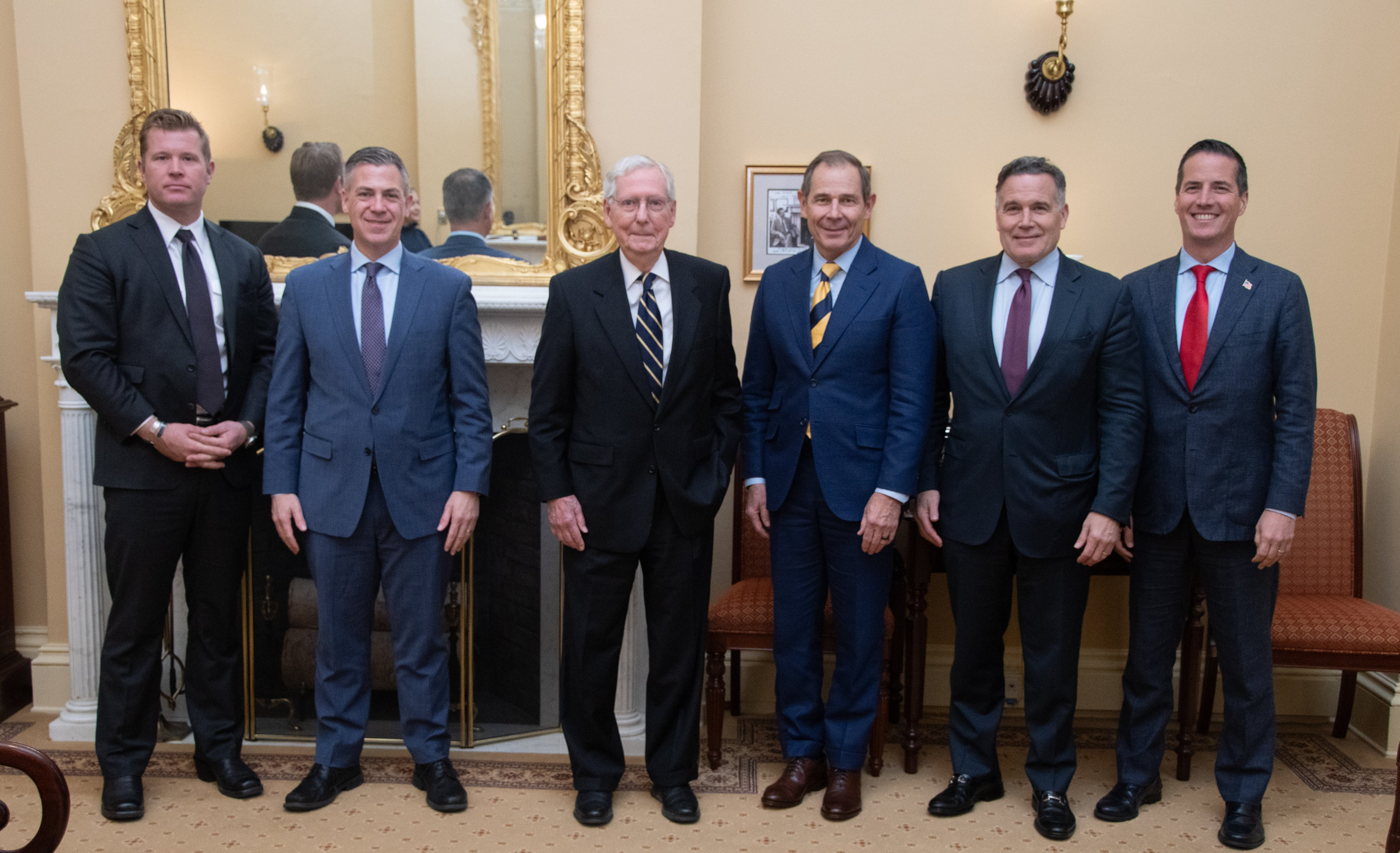
Sheehy (left) with fellow incoming Republican senators meeting Sen. Mitch McConnell, November 2024

During the campaign, Sheehy said his top three priorities were immigration, education, and the crisis at the U.S. southern border. He said that young women had been "indoctrinated" on the issue of abortion. He called himself "strongly pro-life" and also "in strong support of IVF". He was critical of 2024 Montana Initiative 128, a ballot initiative to establish a right to abortion up to fetal viability in the Montana constitution.

In an August 2023 town hall, Sheehy called for a border wall and blamed China for facilitating fentanyl trafficking.

Sheehy has said, "We have a Department of Education, which I don't think we need anymore." He proposes eliminating the department, which he says will save $30 billion.

Sheehy has said "public lands belong in public hands" to protect rights to hunt, fish, and recreate, and that more local collaboration and input is needed since "Montanans know best how to manage our lands, not the Washington bureaucrats". Sheehy was criticized for failing to disclose in Senate ethics filings that he was on the board of Property and Environment Research Center (PERC), a nonprofit free market environmentalism think tank with a history of advocating for privatization of federal lands.

Recordings first reported by The Char-Koosta News in August 2024 of Sheehy at a 2023 closed-door fundraiser led to accusations that he had racially stereotyped Montana's Crow people. In one statement about how he ropes and brands cattle with Crow tribe members, he said it is "a great way to bond with all the Indians while they're drunk at 8 a.m." Sheehy said the tapes had been "chopped up". Tribal leaders requested an apology, but Sheehy declined.

=== Tenure ===
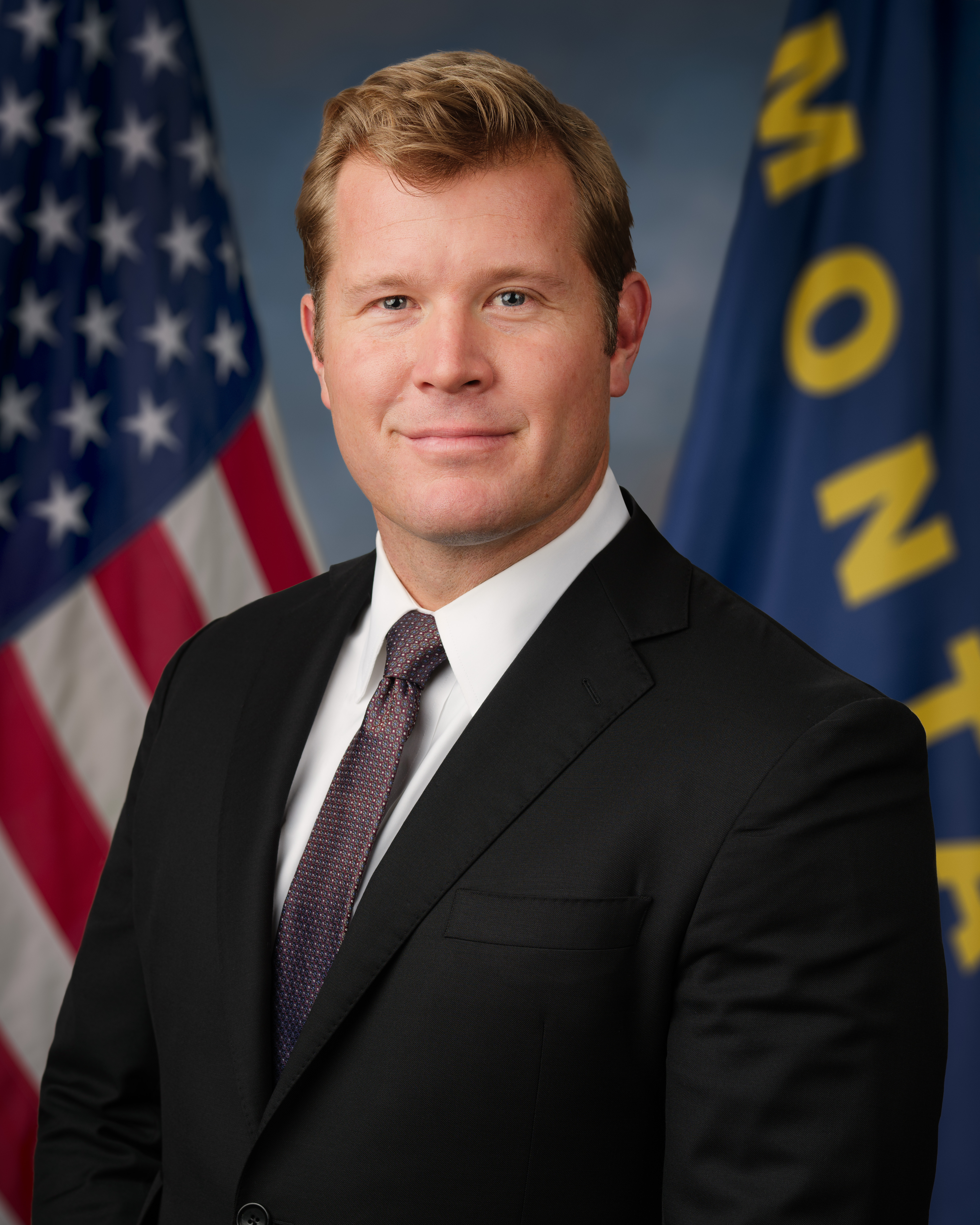
Alternate official portrait, 2025

On March 18, 2025, President Donald Trump announced that he would appoint Sheehy to serve on the United States Naval Academy's Board of Visitors. The service on the board is concurrent with his service in the Senate.

==== Legislation ====
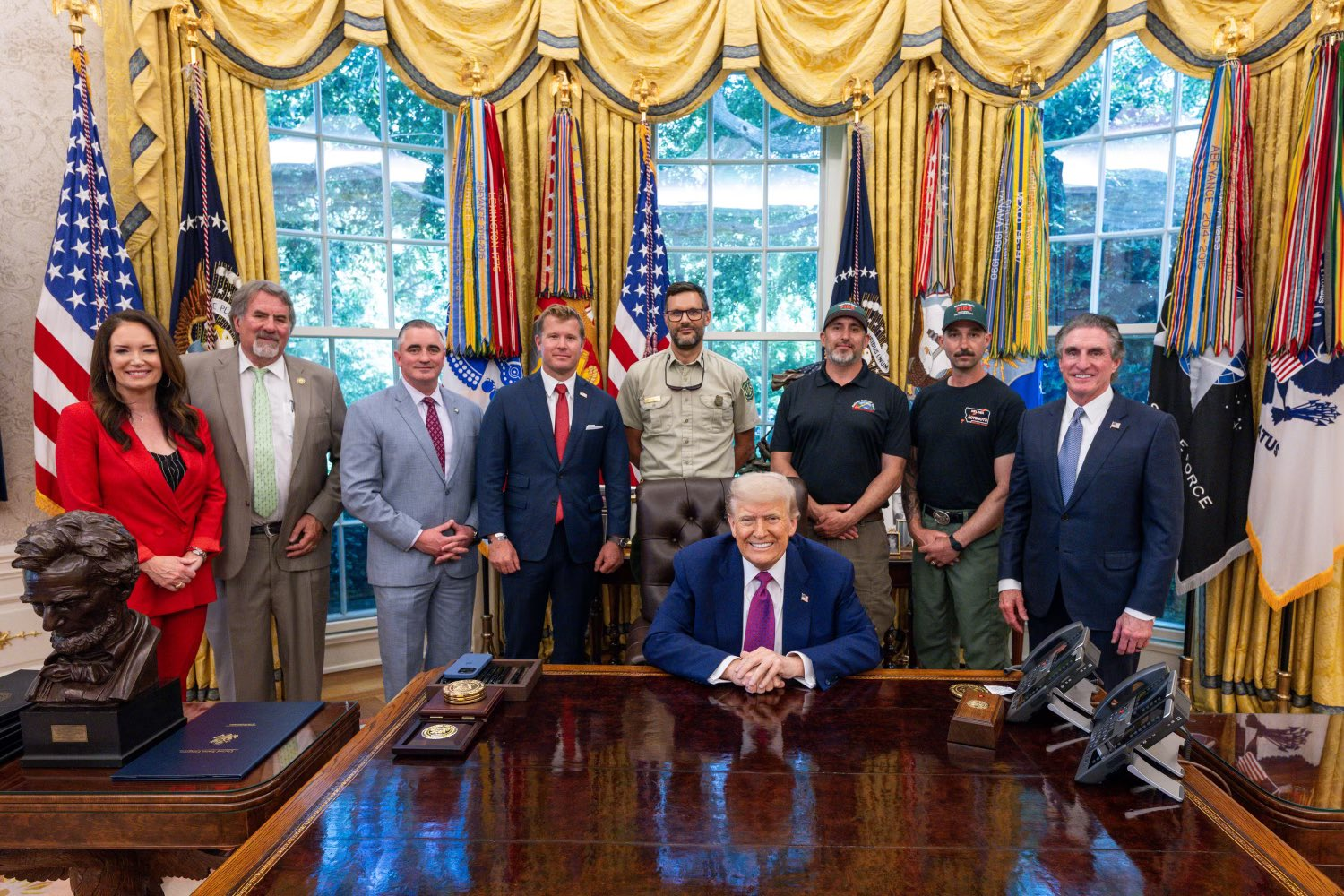
Sheehy with President Donald Trump, Secretary Doug Burgum, and Secretary Brooke Rollins in the Oval Office, 2025

Sheehy's firefighting experience inspired his approach to legislation to restructure how the U.S. responds to wildfires. Sheehy's bill S.160, the "Aerial Firefighting Enhancement Act of 2025", allowing private companies to buy former military planes and parts for wildfire response purposes, was signed into law on June 12, 2025, by President Trump.

In April 2025, Sheehy introduced the Fix Our Forests Act alongside Senators John Hickenlooper, John Curtis, and Alex Padilla. The bill aims to improve forest management for wildfire risk reduction.

Sheehy cosponsored a proposal to eliminate the estate tax.

Sheehy supports killing a decades-old solar energy tax credit.

In December 2025, Sheehy co-sponsored a bill to remove protections from three Montana Wilderness Study Areas, the Middle Fork Judith River WSA, and the Hoodoo Mountain and the Wales Creek WSAs in the Garnet Range.

==== Senate chambers altercation ====
On March 4, 2026, Sheehy involved himself in an attempt by United States Capitol Police to eject antiwar and anti-Israel protester Brian McGinnis, a Marine Corps veteran and North Carolina political candidate. The officers, later joined by Sheehy, sought to physically restrain and pull McGinnis through the chambers' exit door. McGinnis had his arm stuck in an adjacent door, resulting in it breaking and snapping mid-scuffle. McGinnis was arrested and transported to a hospital for treatment.

=== Committee assignments ===
For the 119th Congress:

- Committee on Armed Services
  - Subcommittee on Emerging Threats and Capabilities
  - Subcommittee on Readiness and Management Support
  - Subcommittee on Seapower
- Committee on Commerce, Science, and Transportation
  - Subcommittee on Aviation, Space, and Innovation
  - Subcommittee on Telecommunications and Media
  - Subcommittee on Coast Guard, Maritime, and Fisheries
- Committee on Veterans' Affairs

== Personal life ==
Sheehy was involved in a 2019 plane crash in which he was receiving multi-engine instruction. The plane crashed into a house, killing the flight instructor and injuring a person in the house. Sheehy sustained minor injuries. After inspecting the plane and interviewing Sheehy, who said he was not piloting it, the National Transportation Safety Board determined the instructor's actions led to the crash.

Sheehy lives with his wife, Carmen, a former Marine Corps officer, and their four children, who are home-schooled, on a ranch outside Bozeman. Before running for the U.S. Senate, Sheehy and his wife donated almost $6 million to various non-profits across Montana, with over two thirds of the donations going to support a neonatal intensive care unit at Bozeman Health Deaconess Hospital.

== Electoral history ==
2024 Republican Senate primary results
| Party | Candidate | Votes | % |
|---|---|---|---|
| Republican | Tim Sheehy | 139,857 | 73.60% |
| Republican | Brad Johnson | 36,926 | 19.43% |
| Republican | Charles Walkingchild Sr. | 13,229 | 6.96% |
| Total votes | | 190,012 | 100.00% |

2024 United States Senate election in Montana
| Party | Candidate | Votes | % | ±% |
|---|---|---|---|---|
| Republican | Tim Sheehy | 319,682 | 52.64% | +5.86% |
| Democratic | Jon Tester (incumbent) | 276,305 | 45.50% | −4.83% |
| Libertarian | Sid Daoud | 7,272 | 1.20% | −1.68% |
| Green | Robert Barb | 4,003 | 0.66% | N/A |
| Total votes | | 607,262 | 100.00% | N/A |
| Republican gain from Democratic | | | | |

== See also ==
- List of new members of the 119th United States Congress
- List of United States Navy SEALs

Party political offices
| Preceded by Matt Rosendale | Republican nominee for U.S. Senator from Montana (Class 1); 2024 | Most recent |
U.S. Senate
| Preceded by Jon Tester | U.S. Senator (Class 1) from Montana; 2025–present Served alongside: Steve Daines, Kurt Alme (elect) | Incumbent |
U.S. order of precedence (ceremonial)
| Preceded by Elissa Slotkin | Order of precedence of the United States as United States Senator | Succeeded by John Curtis |
| Preceded by Angela Alsobrooks | United States senators by seniority 95th | Succeeded by Jim Justice |
