= Fix Our Forests Act =

Proposed US forest management legislation

- Long title: To expedite under the National Environmental Policy Act of 1969 and improve forest management activities on National Forest System lands, on public lands under the jurisdiction of the Bureau of Land Management, and on Tribal lands to return resilience to overgrown, fire-prone forested lands, and for other purposes.
- Acronyms (colloquial): FOFA
- Announced in: the 119th United States Congress

Legislative history
- Introduced in the United States House of Representatives as H.R. 471 by Bruce Westerman R‑AR, Scott Peters D‑CA on January 16, 2025; Committee consideration by United States House Committee on Natural Resources, United States House Committee on Agriculture, United States House Committee on Science, Space, and Technology; Passed the United States House of Representatives on January 23, 2025 (279–141)

Fix Our Forests Act
- Long title: To improve forest management activities on National Forest System land, public land under the jurisdiction of the Bureau of Land Management, and Tribal land to return resilience to overgrown, fire-prone forested land, and for other purposes.
- Acronyms (colloquial): FOFA
- Announced in: the 119th United States Congress

Legislative history
- Introduced in the United States Senate as S. 1462 by John Curtis R‑UT, John Hickenlooper D‑CO, Alex Padilla D‑CA, and Tim Sheehy R‑MT on April 10, 2025; Committee consideration by United States Senate Committee on Agriculture, Nutrition, and Forestry

The Fix Our Forests Act (H.R. 471 and S. 1462) is a pair of bills introduced in the United States Congress in 2025 (S. 1462 in the Senate by Senators John Curtis, John Hickenlooper, Alex Padilla, and Tim Sheehy) that aims to improve forest management and reduce wildfire risks. The legislation describes forest thinning, streamlined permitting, and fireshed management as solutions to fire-prone landscapes.

== History ==
The area burned by wildfires each year in the United States has trended upward since the 1980s. The years with the most burned acreage coincide with the warmest years on record. Contemporary fire severity has been unprecedented, causing forest loss and harm to human lives, infrastructure, and water supplies, though the area burned is still in a "fire deficit" compared to historic pre-1880 ecosystems. Drought and the accumulation of fuels have extended fire seasons and intensified fires. Almost 9 million acres burned in 2024. Meanwhile, permits for forest management projects can take about 3 years to receive approval. Furthermore, while wildfires threaten urban areas and natural resources, they also produce greenhouse gases that accelerate climate change. That climate change has increased the frequency and severity of forest health stressors such as drought, fire, and invasive species, causing US interior forest area to decrease up to 9.5% between 2001 and 2019.

The Fix Our Forests Act was introduced by Representatives Scott Peters (D‑CA) and Bruce Westerman (R‑AR). The bill was introduced as H.R. 471 on January 16, 2025 in the 119th Congress, but it had previously been introduced during 2024 as H.R. 8790 in the 118th Congress, with the same lead sponsors. H.R. 8709 passed the House with yeas from all Republicans and 55 Democrats.

The bill passed the House of Representatives 279–141 with the yeas of 215 Republicans and 64 Democrats on January 23, 2025. The bill's passage came during negotiations over disaster aid for the 2025 California wildfires, with President Donald Trump and other Republicans considering using conditions on aid to California as leverage to pass reforms to forest management laws or a debt ceiling increase. A number of House Democrats, among them southern Californian representatives, expressed opposition to any deal that would trade support for disaster aid. Some Democrats against the bill, such as Ro Khanna (D‑CA), decried politicization of the disaster. Representative Westerman, while against the usage of disaster aid as pressure to pass the bill, commented that the proposed legislation could have addressed the buildup of vegetation in the Santa Monica Mountains that fueled the fire's rapid spread.

In April 2025, Senators John Hickenlooper (D‑CO), Alex Padilla (D‑CA), John Curtis (R‑UT), and Tim Sheehy (R‑MT) introduced a revised version of the Act in the Senate. The revisions resulted from months of bipartisan discussions on forest management practices, community protection, watershed protection, and federal, state, tribal, and private stakeholders.

On May 6, 2025, the United States Senate Committee on Agriculture, Nutrition, and Forestry gave the bill a legislative hearing. Padilla described the bill then as desperately needed to address the rise of wildfires, with the nine largest Californian fires all occurring after 2017.

== Reception ==
Political support exists for differing reasons across political parties. Donald Trump and allied Republicans support reforms to forest management. Progressives support Indigenous cultural burning (preventative burning) practices, which this bill would codify.

Opinions differ among major environmental groups. Some fear it will unnecessarily increase logging, while others trust the rules to continue permitting only ecologically necessary activities.

Some, such as Environment America, the Sierra Club, and the Center for Biological Diversity, oppose the Act based on assertions that it would undermine environmental protection laws and harm forests, endangered species, and community oversight of federal land management. A number of these conservation and environmental organizations signed on to an open letter criticizing the bill as empowering industrial logging interests by opening millions of acres of public forests to logging. The letter specifically warns that increased logging road density would increase the number of human-caused wildfire ignitions and fragment habitat. Environment America specifically expressed concern about protections provided in the National Environmental Policy Act (NEPA) and Endangered Species Act of 1973, possible logging on some federal land without environmental review, and limitations on lawsuits against federal agencies. The Citizens' Climate Lobby however notes that the Act does not alter or roll back NEPA or the Endangered Species Act and considers Fix Our Forests' emergency response powers warranted due to the wildfire crisis.

Representative Jared Huffman (D‑CA) complained that good provisions of Fix Our Forests included no funding. He recommended his competing bill, the Community Protection and Wildfire Resilience Act, which he had co-authored with Representative Jay Obernolte (R‑CA) and centers financial incentives for communities to write their own fire resilience plans.

Tree thinning to reduce fire risk is somewhat controversial, with opponents worrying the bill could expand logging on federal lands under the label of fire risk reduction and supporters pointing to strict ecosystem protection rules against such abuse. Fears were stoked by President Trump's April 2025 executive order to expand timber production. Though Firefighters United for Safety, Ethics, and Ecology executive director Tim Ingalsbee described tree thinning as counterproductive, increasing fire risk, a study published in 2023 found that thinning, as well as prescribed fire, produced forests with lower wildfire risks. Study lead author Scott Stephens noted however that thinning for ecological restoration and fire safety must target smaller, younger, more fire-susceptible trees; commercial logging of the largest, most mature, and most fire-resilient trees would instead raise fire risks by causing large trees to be replaced by smaller ones. Nonprofit Megafire Action noted that the Act would only expand logging with the purpose of ecosystem resilience; the act leaves in place, for its categorical exclusions, requirements (among others) to maximize retention of large trees and maintain or restore ecological integrity. Against assertions that expanded categorical exclusions, delays of environmental review for logging, and the 120-day statue of limitations would allow the timber industry free rein, Peters aide Paul Iskajyan described tree thinning as only one tool, to be used according to expert decisions following environmental laws, and pointed to improvements to interagency collaboration and research investments as other good provisions.

The National Congress of American Indians, the Western Fire Chiefs Association, American Forests, the Theodore Roosevelt Conservation Partnership, and the Federation of American Scientists supported the House bill. The Federation of American Scientists particularly supports the creation of the Fireshed Center, which would provide scientific decision-making tools to emergency responders and coordinate technology deployment. The National Rural Electric Cooperative Association, Edison Electric Institute, and Pacific Gas and Electric Company made statements supporting the bill for allowing them to more quickly and widely remove vegetation near power lines.

As of June 2025, the Senate bill had received support from a number of fire chiefs, the Western Governors Association, outdoor recreation groups, and environmental organizations including The Nature Conservancy, the National Wildlife Federation, the Environmental Defense Fund, the National Audubon Society, the California Department of Forestry and Fire Protection, and the Alliance for Wildfire Resilience. Nonprofit Megafire Action contrasted present-day urgency of wildfire dangers against slow permitting, while noting that, in contrast to laws that allowed broad clear-cutting during the "timber wars" of the 1980s and 1990s, the rules as set in the Senate bill do not expand permission for clear-cutting and only allow work for wildfire resilience. Megafire Action supported a number of provisions that were added in the Senate version, including easier approval for prescribed burning. Colorado State Forest Service Director Matt McCombs approved of a number of provisions that would help Colorado, such as the Joint Chiefs Landscape Restoration Program, but more broadly supported the Act for its overall expansion of forest and watershed health efforts. The Nature Conservancy supported "improved forest and fuels management and expanded use of prescribed fire" while expressing concern that (separate) cuts to United States Forest Service staffing would slow that work. The Theodore Roosevelt Conservation Partnership applauded the Act's recognition that watershed health could reduce wildfire risks, a first in federal statutes.

== Provisions ==
The Fix Our Forests Act makes broad changes. Its provisions simplify environmental regulations to speed forest management efforts, stop lawsuits by environmentalists, and help community fire prevention projects.

=== House ===
A House Committee on Natural Resources press release describes the bill as pursuing the following points:

- "Simplify and expedite environmental reviews for forest management projects"
- Coordinate grant programs and promote research for community resilience
- "Promote federal, state, tribal and local collaboration"
- "Deter frivolous litigation that delays essential projects"
- Prioritize forests at highest risk and near vulnerable communities
- Encourage federal land managers to use new science and techniques
- Encourage active management for powerline and other infrastructure safety
- "Strengthen tools like Good Neighbor Authority and Stewardship Contracting"
- Ensure continuity in wildland firefighter casualty assistance programs
- Expansion of categorical exclusions allowing fireshed management projects from 3,000 to 10,000 acres (without change to eligibility criteria)

Co-author Scott Peters, an environmental lawyer, argues that environmental reviews can delay forest management projects for years. Therefore, it would expedite environmental reviews (pursuant to the National Environmental Policy Act) for certain forest management projects and exempt some activities from such review. It would also establish intra-agency "strike teams" to speed reviews and interagency consultations under NEPA, the Endangered Species Act of 1973, and the National Historic Preservation Act. It would also reduce consultation requirements regarding protected species under the Forest and Rangeland Renewable Resources Planning Act of 1974 and Federal Land Policy and Management Act of 1976.

The Act would designate certain high-risk areas as fireshed management areas; areas such as the Pacific Palisades would receive priority funding. The United States Forest Service and United States Geological Survey would create an interagency Fireshed Center responsible for assessing and predicting fire; the Center would also help coordinate local, state, tribal, and federal fire prevention agencies.

In order to deter frivolous litigation, the bill includes a provision that "A court shall not enjoin a covered agency action if the court determines that the plaintiff is unable to demonstrate that the claim of the plaintiff is likely to succeed on the merits." and requires claims seeking judicial review of covered federal agency actions to be filed within 120 days of the public notice.

The bill's provisions also include authorization to use new risk assessment methods and tree thinning, prescribed burns, logging, fire breaks, and dead brush removal.

The bill would also allow electric co-ops to remove trees up to 150 feet from their rights of way in order to prevent them from falling on power lines and starting fires. This is an increase from the current 10 feet.

The Fix Our Forests Act represents a nationwide expansion of reforms implemented in the Tahoe Basin by the WIIN Act of 2016, which reduced approval waiting periods for forest thinning projects from five years to four months.

=== Senate ===
The Senate version adds, beyond the House bill, a number of provisions:

- Expand the Community Wildfire Risk Reduction Program
- Make home hardening eligible for the Community Wildfire Defense Grant program
- Establish (instead of the Fireshed Center) the Wildfire Intelligence Center, a joint program between the Department of the Interior and the Department of Agriculture, with broader responsibilities
- Increase accessibility of training and assignments for non-federal prescribed burners, among other prescribed fire provisions

Other additions include the following:

- Wildfire recovery as an eligible activity of the Joint Chiefs Landscape Restoration Partnership Program
- Expansions of watershed protection programs
- A longer time limit on filing claims for judicial review of covered actions at 150 days instead of the House version's 120 days
- Broader permissions for utility companies to remove vegetation near electrical transmission lines
- Grants to increase tree nursery capacity
- Creation of the White Oak Restoration Initiative Coalition, an organization tasked with restoring white oak forests
