= United States Senate Armed Services Subcommittee on Emerging Threats and Capabilities =

United States military government committee

The Senate Armed Services Subcommittee on Emerging Threats and Capabilities is one of seven subcommittees within the Senate Armed Services Committee.

== Jurisdiction ==
The Emerging Threats and Capabilities subcommittee has jurisdiction over Department of Defense policies and programs to counter emerging threats (such as proliferation of weapons of mass destruction, terrorism, illegal drugs, and other threats), information warfare and special operations programs, the Defense Threat Reduction Agency, and Department of Energy non-proliferation programs. The subcommittee also oversees sales of U.S. military technology to foreign countries, and defense and military research and development efforts through the Defense Advanced Research Projects Agency.

== Members, 119th Congress ==
Majority	Minority
Joni Ernst, Iowa, Chair; Tom Cotton, Arkansas; Mike Rounds, South Dakota; Kevin Cramer, North Dakota; Markwayne Mullin, Oklahoma; Ted Budd, North Carolina; Eric Schmitt, Missouri; Tim Sheehy, Montana	Elissa Slotkin, Michigan, Ranking Member; Jeanne Shaheen, New Hampshire; Kirsten Gillibrand, New York; Tim Kaine, Virginia; Gary Peters, Michigan; Jacky Rosen, Nevada; Mark Kelly, Arizona
Ex officio
Roger Wicker, Mississippi	Jack Reed, Rhode Island

== Historical subcommittee rosters ==
=== 118th Congress ===
Majority	Minority
Kirsten Gillibrand, New York, Chair; Jeanne Shaheen, New Hampshire; Jacky Rosen, Nevada; Elizabeth Warren, Massachusetts; Gary Peters, Michigan; Mark Kelly, Arizona	Joni Ernst, Iowa, Ranking Member; Tom Cotton, Arkansas; Markwayne Mullin, Oklahoma; Ted Budd, North Carolina; Eric Schmitt, Missouri
Ex officio
Jack Reed, Rhode Island	Roger Wicker, Mississippi

=== 117th Congress ===
Majority	Minority
Mark Kelly, Arizona, Chair; Jeanne Shaheen, New Hampshire; Tim Kaine, Virginia; Elizabeth Warren, Massachusetts; Gary Peters, Michigan; Kirsten Gillibrand, New York	Joni Ernst, Iowa, Ranking Member; Deb Fischer, Nebraska; Kevin Cramer, North Dakota; Rick Scott, Florida; Marsha Blackburn, Tennessee; Tommy Tuberville, Alabama
Ex officio
Jack Reed, Rhode Island	Jim Inhofe, Oklahoma

=== 116th Congress ===
Majority	Minority
Joni Ernst, Iowa, Chairwoman; Deb Fischer, Nebraska; Kevin Cramer, North Dakota; Marsha Blackburn, Tennessee; Josh Hawley, Missouri	Gary Peters, Michigan, Ranking Member; Jeanne Shaheen, New Hampshire; Mazie Hirono, Hawaii; Martin Heinrich, New Mexico
Ex officio
Jim Inhofe, Oklahoma	Jack Reed, Rhode Island

=== 115th Congress ===
Majority	Minority
Joni Ernst, Iowa, Chairwoman; Roger Wicker, Mississippi; Deb Fischer, Nebraska; David Perdue, Georgia; Ted Cruz, Texas	Martin Heinrich, New Mexico, Ranking Member; Bill Nelson, Florida; Jeanne Shaheen, New Hampshire; Gary Peters, Michigan
Ex officio
John McCain, Arizona	Jack Reed, Rhode Island

== See also ==
- U.S. House Armed Services Subcommittee on Emerging Threats and Capabilities
