= Jacky Rosen =

American politician (born 1957)

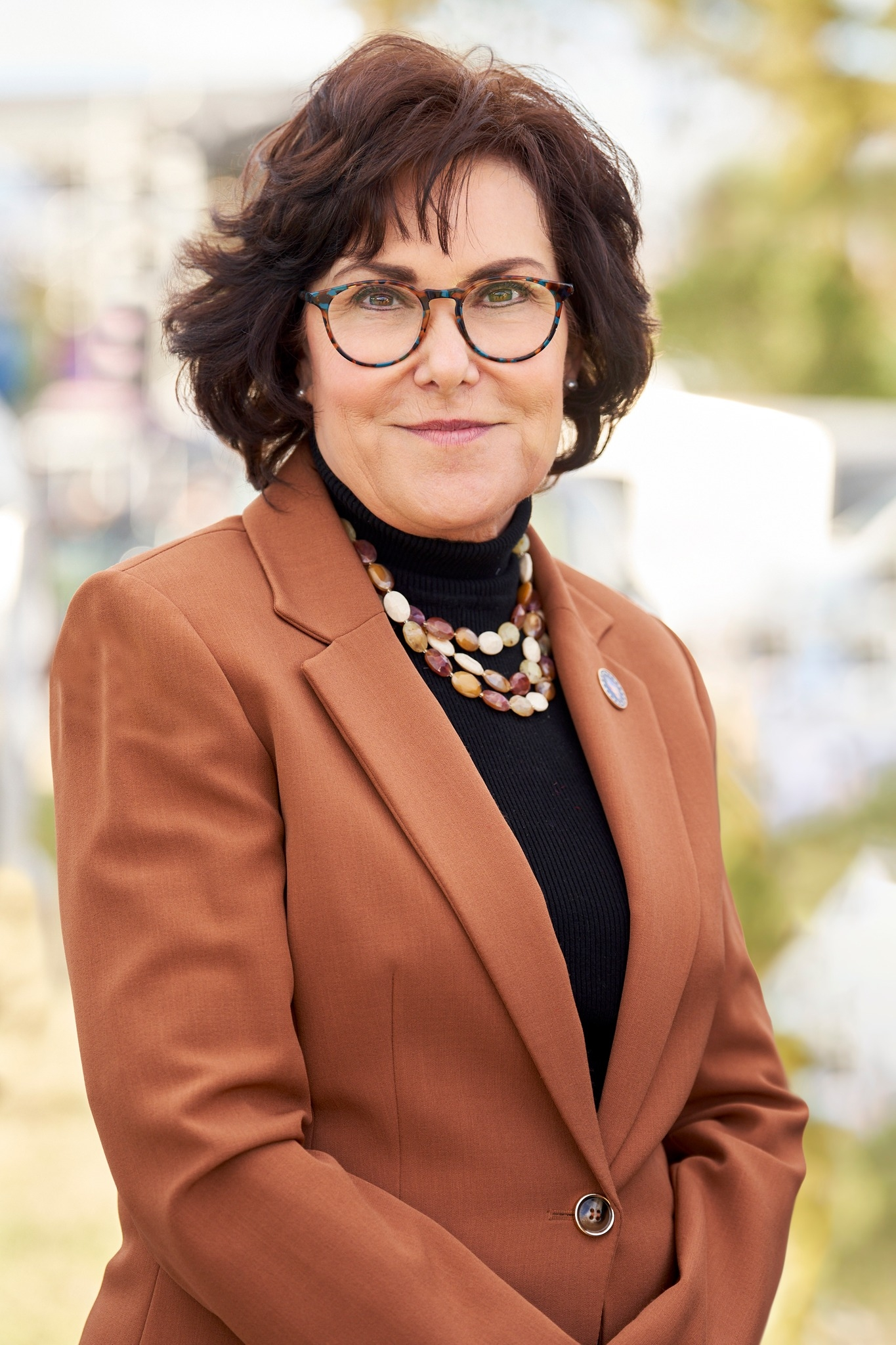
- Official portrait, 2022

United States Senator from Nevada
- Incumbent
- Assumed office January 3, 2019 Serving with Catherine Cortez Masto
- Preceded by: Dean Heller

Member of the U.S. House of Representatives from Nevada's 3rd district
- In office January 3, 2017 – January 3, 2019
- Preceded by: Joe Heck
- Succeeded by: Susie Lee

Personal details
- Born: Jacklyn Sheryl Spektor; August 2, 1957 (age 69) Chicago, Illinois, U.S.
- Party: Democratic
- Spouse(s): Lloyd Neher (divorced) Larry Rosen (m. 1993)
- Children: 1
- Education: University of Minnesota (BA); Clark County Community College (AS)
- Website: Senate website Campaign website
- Rosen's voice Rosen questioning witnesses on ransomware. Recorded June 7, 2022

Jacklyn Sheryl Rosen (née Spektor; born August 2, 1957) is an American politician serving as the junior United States senator from Nevada since 2019. A member of the Democratic Party, she was the U.S. representative for Nevada's 3rd congressional district from 2017 to 2019.

Rosen was first elected to Congress in 2016 with 47.2% of the vote. She was elected to the Senate in 2018, defeating Republican incumbent Dean Heller with 50.4% of the vote. Rosen was reelected in 2024 with 47.9% of the vote.

== Early life and career ==
Rosen was born on August 2, 1957, in Chicago, Illinois, to Carol, a homemaker, and Leonard Spektor, a car dealership owner who had served in the U.S. Army during the Korean War. Rosen's mother was of Irish, German, and Austrian descent, and her father's family were Jewish immigrants from Russia and Austria.

Rosen attended the University of Minnesota and graduated with a Bachelor of Arts degree in psychology in 1979. While she was in college, her parents moved to Las Vegas, where Rosen moved after graduating. She took a job with Summa Corporation and worked summers as a waitress at Caesars Palace throughout the 1980s. While working for Summa, she attended Clark County Community College (College of Southern Nevada) and received an associate degree in computing and information technology in 1985. She began working for Southwest Gas from 1990 to 1993.

Rosen has touted her efforts to "build a business", but a Reno Gazette-Journal review of public records found no evidence that she held a state or local business license. According to Rosen, she ran a company between 1993 and 2002, of which she was the only employee. Her business served two main clients, Southwest Gas, which was Rosen's former employer, and Radiology Specialists, a Las Vegas-based physician group that employed Rosen's husband.

== U.S. House of Representatives ==
=== Elections ===
==== 2016 ====
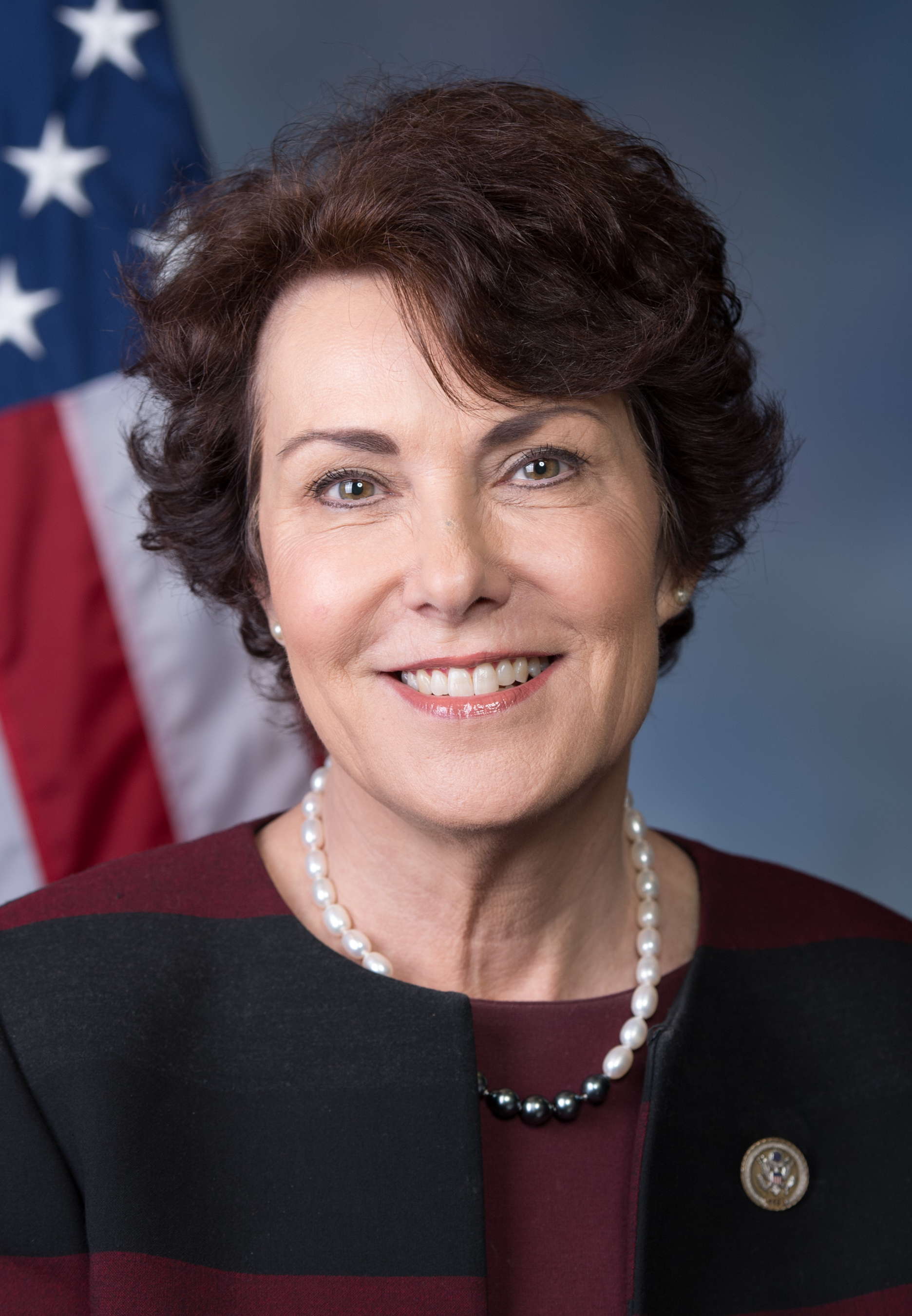
Rosen during the 115th Congress as a U.S. representative

A former computer programmer with no political experience at the time, Rosen was asked by U.S. Senate Minority Leader Harry Reid, also from Nevada, to run in the 2016 election for the U.S. House seat being vacated by Republican Joe Heck. On January 26, she declared her candidacy for Nevada's 3rd congressional district. Rosen won 60% of the vote in the Democratic primary election and narrowly defeated Republican nominee Danny Tarkanian in the general election. She was sworn into office on January 3, 2017.

=== Committee assignments ===
- Committee on Armed Services
  - Subcommittee on Military Personnel
  - Subcommittee on Tactical Air and Land Forces
- Committee on Science, Space, and Technology
  - Subcommittee on Energy
  - Subcommittee on Research and Technology

=== Caucus memberships ===
- Congressional Arts Caucus
- Congressional Asian Pacific American Caucus
- Congressional Caucus for Women's Issues
- Problem Solvers Caucus
- Congressional Coalition on Adoption

== U.S. Senate ==
=== Elections ===
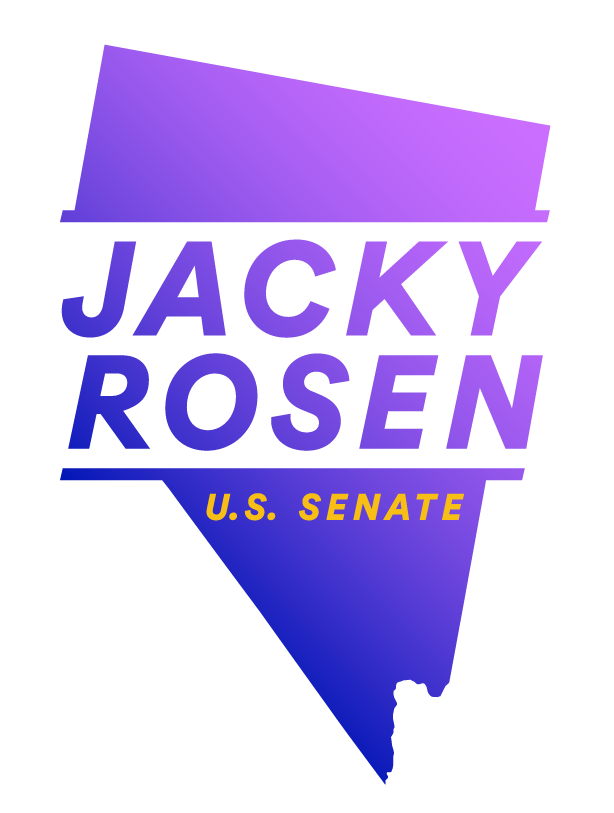
Rosen's U.S. Senate campaign logo

==== 2018 ====
Rosen was elected to the U.S. Senate on November 6, 2018, defeating one-term Republican senator Dean Heller to become the junior senator from Nevada. Her candidacy, announced on July 5, 2017, was endorsed by former President Barack Obama and former Vice President Joe Biden. During the campaign, Rosen emphasized her support for the Affordable Care Act (Obamacare) and criticized Heller's vote to repeal it in 2017. At the time, Rosen voted in the U.S. House against Republicans' attempts to repeal Obamacare.

Rosen defeated Heller, 50.4% to 45.4%. Heller carried 15 of Nevada's 17 county-level jurisdictions, but Rosen carried the state's two largest, Clark (home to Las Vegas) and Washoe (home to Reno). She won Clark County by over 92,000 votes, almost double her statewide margin of more than 48,900 votes.

Rosen was one of only two non-incumbent Democrats, alongside Kyrsten Sinema of Arizona, to win election to the Senate in 2018. She is also the 37th freshman member of the U.S. House to win a Senate seat and the first woman to do so.

==== 2024 ====
Rosen was reelected in 2024, defeating Republican nominee Sam Brown, a retired U.S. Army captain, 48% to 46%.

=== Tenure ===
Rosen was on Capitol Hill for the 2021 United States Electoral College vote count when supporters of President Donald Trump stormed the U.S. Capitol. At the time, she was in the Russell Senate Office Building before being evacuated to a secure, undisclosed location. She tweeted during the attack, calling the event "reprehensible" and writing, "It's time for us as a nation to come together and denounce hate and violence."

In November 2025, Rosen became one of eight Democrats who voted to end the federal government shutdown.

=== Committee assignments ===
- Committee on Commerce, Science, and Transportation
  - Subcommittee on Aviation, Space, and Innovation
  - Subcommittee on Telecommunications and Media
  - Subcommittee on Science, Manufacturing, and Competitiveness
- Committee on Armed Services
  - Subcommittee on Cybersecurity (Ranking Member)
  - Subcommittee on Strategic Forces
  - Subcommittee on Emerging Threats and Capabilities
- Committee on Foreign Relations
  - Subcommittee on Near East, South Asia, Central Asia, and Counterterrorism (Ranking Member)
  - Subcommittee on International Development, Multilateral Institutions, and International Economic, Energy, and Environmental Policy
  - Subcommittee on Western Hemisphere, Transnational Crime, Civilian Security, Democracy, Human Rights, and Global Women's Issues

=== Federal courts controvery ===
In March 2024, Rosen announced she would not support President Biden's nomination of Adeel Mangi to the United States Court of Appeals for the Third Circuit, citing his association with the Alliance of Families for Justice, a criminal justice reform group. Manji's nomination remained blocked, and in November 2024 it was withdrawn, leaving the position open for the incoming Trump administration to fill. After Rosen blocked Manji's nomination, Trump appointed Emil Bove, a controversial nominee who was accused of defying court orders and attended a Trump rally in Pennsylvania shortly after he became a federal judge, to the vacancy. Rosen voted against Bove's confirmation. Bove's appointment to the judgeship to which Rosen refused to confirm Manji effectively flipped control of the intermediate federal appellate court that has jurisdiction over all federal court appeals from Pennsylvania, New Jersey, Delaware, and the U.S. Virgin Islands to a conservative majority.

== Political positions ==
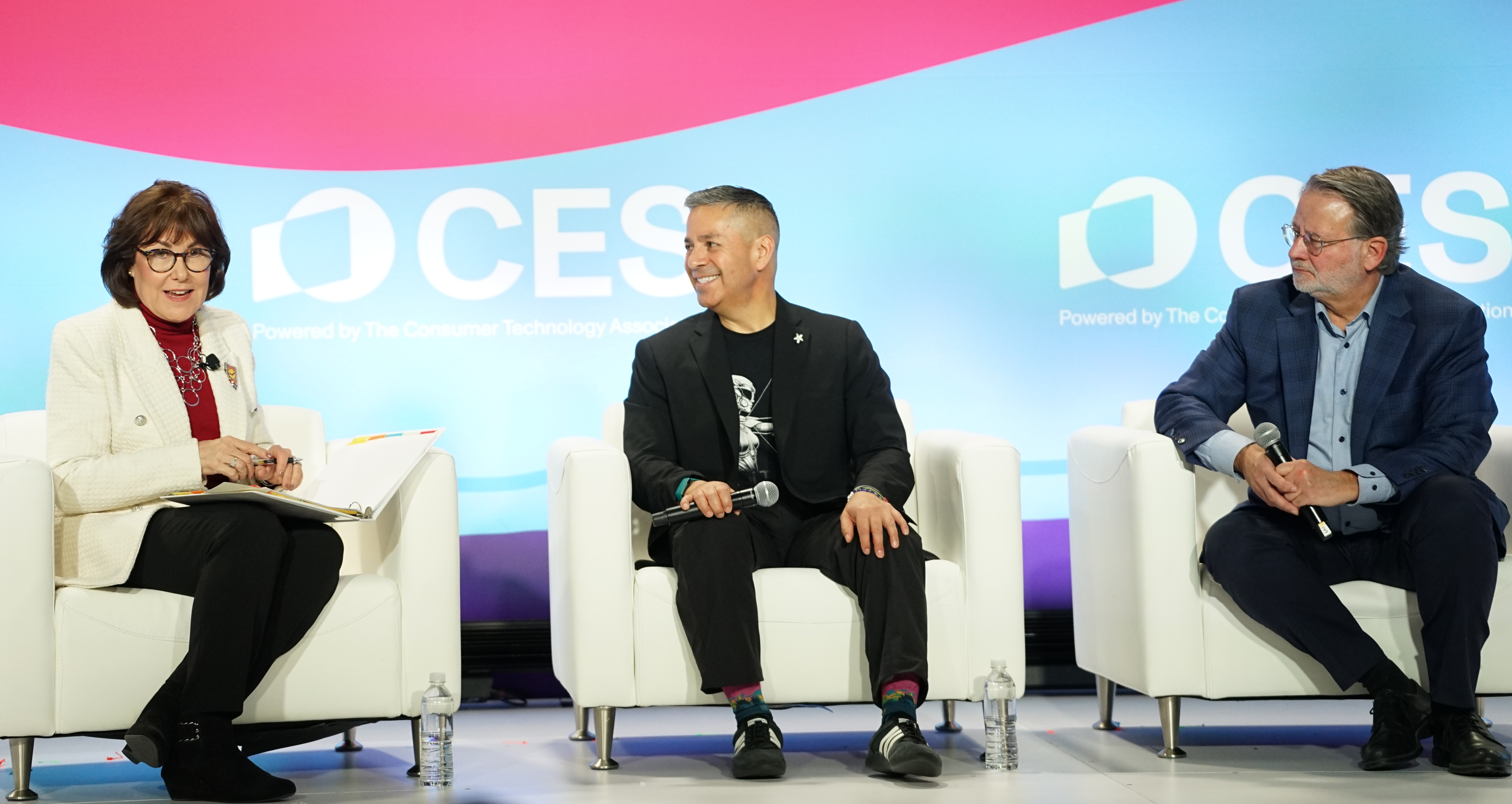
Rosen hosts Senators Ben Ray Luján and Gary Peters at CES 2026

Rosen has been described as a liberal Democrat at times and as a moderate at others. As of April 2020, FiveThirtyEight found that Rosen's votes aligned with President Trump's legislative positions about 36% of the time. The American Conservative Union gave her a 5% lifetime conservative rating in 2020. In 2023, the Lugar Center ranked Rosen sixth among senators for bipartisanship.

=== Abortion ===
Rosen supports abortion rights and has been endorsed by NARAL Pro-Choice America.

=== Antisemitism ===
In 2019, Rosen and James Lankford co-founded the Senate Bipartisan Task Force for Combating Antisemitism. In 2024, she introduced the Countering Antisemitism Act to establish an interagency task force to counter antisemitism. She noted "skyrocketing antisemitism in the United States and the world" after the October 7 Hamas-led attacks on Israel.

=== Foreign policy ===
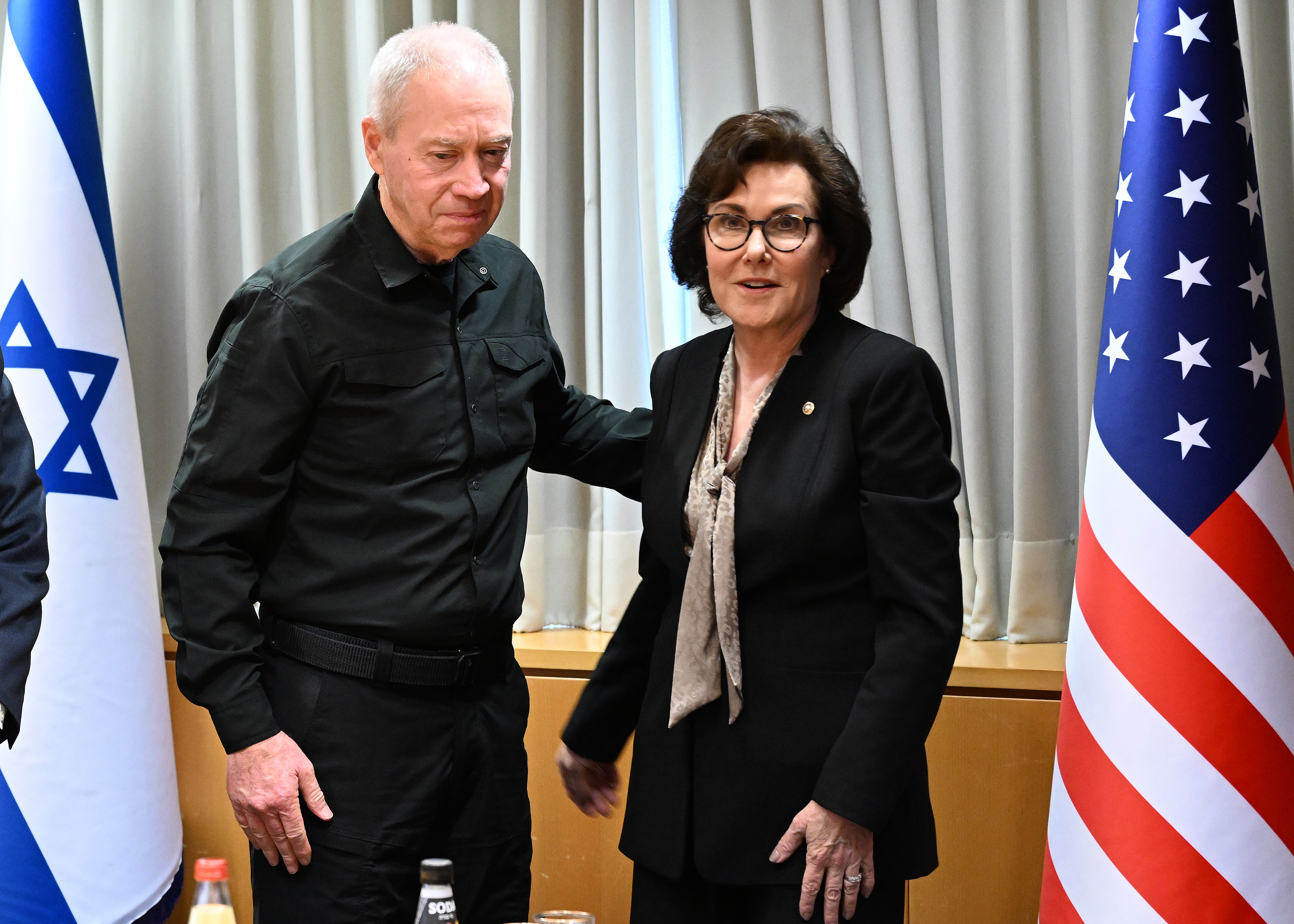
Rosen with Israeli Defense Minister Yoav Gallant on October 15, 2023

In April 2019, Rosen was one of 34 senators to sign a letter to President Trump encouraging him "to listen to members of your own Administration and reverse a decision that will damage our national security and aggravate conditions inside Central America." The letter asserted that Trump had "consistently expressed a flawed understanding of U.S. foreign assistance" since becoming president and was "personally undermining efforts to promote U.S. national security and economic prosperity" by preventing Fiscal Year 2018 national security funding. The senators argued that foreign assistance to Central American countries created less migration to the U.S. by helping to improve conditions in those countries.

Rosen met Israeli PM Benjamin Netanyahu and Foreign Minister Gideon Sa'ar in May 2025 during the Gaza war. Rosen was one of the 23 Democratic Senators, a minority of Senate Democrats, who voted for and supported arms sales to Israel during the Gaza starvation in August 2025. Rosen and Tim Scott introduced the Antisemitism Awareness Act in the Senate in February 2025 which directs the Department of Education to use the International Holocaust Remembrance Alliance's (IHRA) definition of antisemitism when investigating antisemitic acts on campus. Congressmen Mike Lawler and Josh Gottheimer are leading companion legislation in the House of Representatives. Critics, such as Senator Bernie Sanders, say that the Act would undermine free speech and stifle criticism against Israel.

In April 2026, Rosen was one of seven Democratic senators to join all Republicans in opposing a pair of resolutions that would have blocked sales of bulldozers and 1,000-pound bombs to Israel.

=== Gun policy ===
Rosen supports an assault weapons ban.

=== Health care ===
Rosen supports the Affordable Care Act (Obamacare) and its provisions that prevent patients from being denied insurance or charged more due to age or a preexisting condition. She supports allowing citizens to buy into Medicaid as an alternative option to competing with private insurance companies.

In January 2019, during the 2018-2019 government shutdown, Rosen was one of 34 senators to sign a letter to Food and Drugs Commissioner Scott Gottlieb recognizing the FDA's efforts to address the effect of the shutdown on the public health and employees while remaining alarmed "that the continued shutdown will result in increasingly harmful effects on the agency's employees and the safety and security of the nation's food and medical products."

In February 2019, Rosen was one of 11 senators to sign a letter to insulin manufactures Eli Lilly and Company, Novo Nordisk, and Sanofi over increased insulin prices, saying the increases kept patients from receiving "access to the life-saving medications they need."

In August 2019, Rosen was one of 19 senators to sign a letter to Treasury Secretary Steve Mnuchin and Health and Human Services Secretary Alex Azar requesting data from the Trump administration in order to help states and Congress understand the potential consequences if the Texas v. United States Affordable Care Act lawsuit prevailed in courts. They wrote that an overhaul of the health care system would form "an enormous hole in the pocketbooks of the people we serve as well as wreck state budgets".

=== Housing ===
In April 2019, Rosen was one of 41 senators to sign a bipartisan letter to the housing subcommittee praising the Department of Housing and Urban Development's Section 4 Capacity Building program as authorizing "HUD to partner with national nonprofit community development organizations to provide education, training, and financial support to local community development corporations (CDCs) across the country" and expressing disappointment that Trump's budget "has slated this program for elimination after decades of successful economic and community development." The senators wrote of their hope that the subcommittee would support continued funding for Section 4 in Fiscal Year 2020.

=== Immigration ===
In June 2017, Rosen voted against the No Sanctuary For Criminals Act, which would have penalized jurisdictions that limit cooperation with federal immigration enforcement and expanded mandatory detention requirements.

Rosen supports "comprehensive immigration reform" but does not believe Immigration and Customs Enforcement should be abolished.

In 2025, Rosen was one of 12 Senate Democrats who joined all Republicans to vote for the Laken Riley Act.

=== Jobs and economy ===
In 2018, Rosen was one of three U.S. House Democrats to break with their party and vote to make individual tax cuts permanent. She supports a $15 hourly minimum wage.

=== Law enforcement ===
Rosen opposed Judge Adeel A. Mangi's nomination to the U.S. Court of Appeals for the Third Circuit, reportedly "based on objections raised by local law enforcement groups".

=== Taxation ===
In 2025, Rosen co-sponsored the No Tax on Tips Act, which received unanimous consent in the Senate.

== Personal life ==
Rosen resides in Henderson, Nevada, with her husband. They have a daughter. Before entering politics, she served as the president of the Congregation Ner Tamid synagogue, a Reform Jewish synagogue in Henderson. She has cited the philosophy of tikkun olam as a key part of her decision to enter politics.

== Electoral history ==
=== 2016 ===
2016 Nevada's 3rd congressional district primary election
Party	Candidate	Votes	%
Democratic	Jacky Rosen	14,219	62.2%
Democratic	Jesse Sbaih	2,928	12.8%
Democratic	Barry Michaels	2,218	9.7%
Democratic	Steven Schiffman	1,237	5.4%
Democratic	Alex Singer	1,207	5.3%
Democratic	Neil Waite	1,055	4.6%

2016 Nevada's 3rd congressional district election
Party	Candidate	Votes	%
Democratic	Jacky Rosen	146,869	47.2%
Republican	Danny Tarkanian	142,926	46.0%
Independent American	Warren Markowitz	11,602	3.7 %
Independent	David Goossen	9,566	3.1%
Total votes		310,963	100.0
Democratic gain from Republican			

=== 2018 ===
2018 United States Senate Democratic primary in Nevada
Party	Candidate	Votes	%
Democratic	Jacky Rosen	110,530	77.1%
None of These Candidates	None of These Candidates	10,070	7.0%
Democratic	David Knight	6,340	4.4%
Democratic	Allen Rheinhart	4,774	3.3%
Democratic	Jesse Sbaih	4,538	3.2%
Democratic	Bobby Mahendra	3,833	2.7%
Democratic	Danny Burleigh	3,244	2.3%

2018 United States Senate election in Nevada
Party	Candidate	Votes	%
Democratic	Jacky Rosen	490,071	50.41%
Republican	Dean Heller (incumbent)	441,202	45.38%
None of These Candidates		15,303	1.57%
Independent	Barry Michaels	9,269	0.95%
Libertarian	Tim Hagan	9,196	0.95%
Independent American	Kamau Bakari	7,091	0.73%
Total votes		972,132	100.0
Democratic gain from Republican			

=== 2024 ===
2024 United States Senate election in Nevada
Party	Candidate	Votes	%
Democratic	Jacky Rosen (incumbent)	701,105	47.87%
Republican	Sam Brown	677,046	46.22%
None of These Candidates		44,380	3.03%
Independent American	Janine Hansen	21,316	1.46%
Libertarian	Chris Cunningham	20,881	1.43%
Total votes		1,464,728	100.0
Democratic hold			

== See also ==
- List of Jewish members of the United States Congress
- Women in the United States House of Representatives
- Women in the United States Senate

U.S. House of Representatives
Preceded by Joe Heck	Member of the U.S. House of Representatives from Nevada's 3rd congressional district 2017–2019	Succeeded by Susie Lee
Party political offices
Preceded by Shelley Berkley	Democratic nominee for U.S. Senator from Nevada (Class 1); 2018, 2024	Most recent
U.S. Senate
Preceded by Dean Heller	United States Senator (Class 1) from Nevada; 2019–present Served alongside: Catherine Cortez Masto	Incumbent
U.S. order of precedence (ceremonial)
Preceded by Josh Hawley	Order of precedence of the United States as United States Senator	Succeeded by Kevin Cramer
Preceded by Kevin Cramer	United States senators by seniority 66th	Succeeded by Josh Hawley
