= Deb Fischer =

American politician (born 1951)

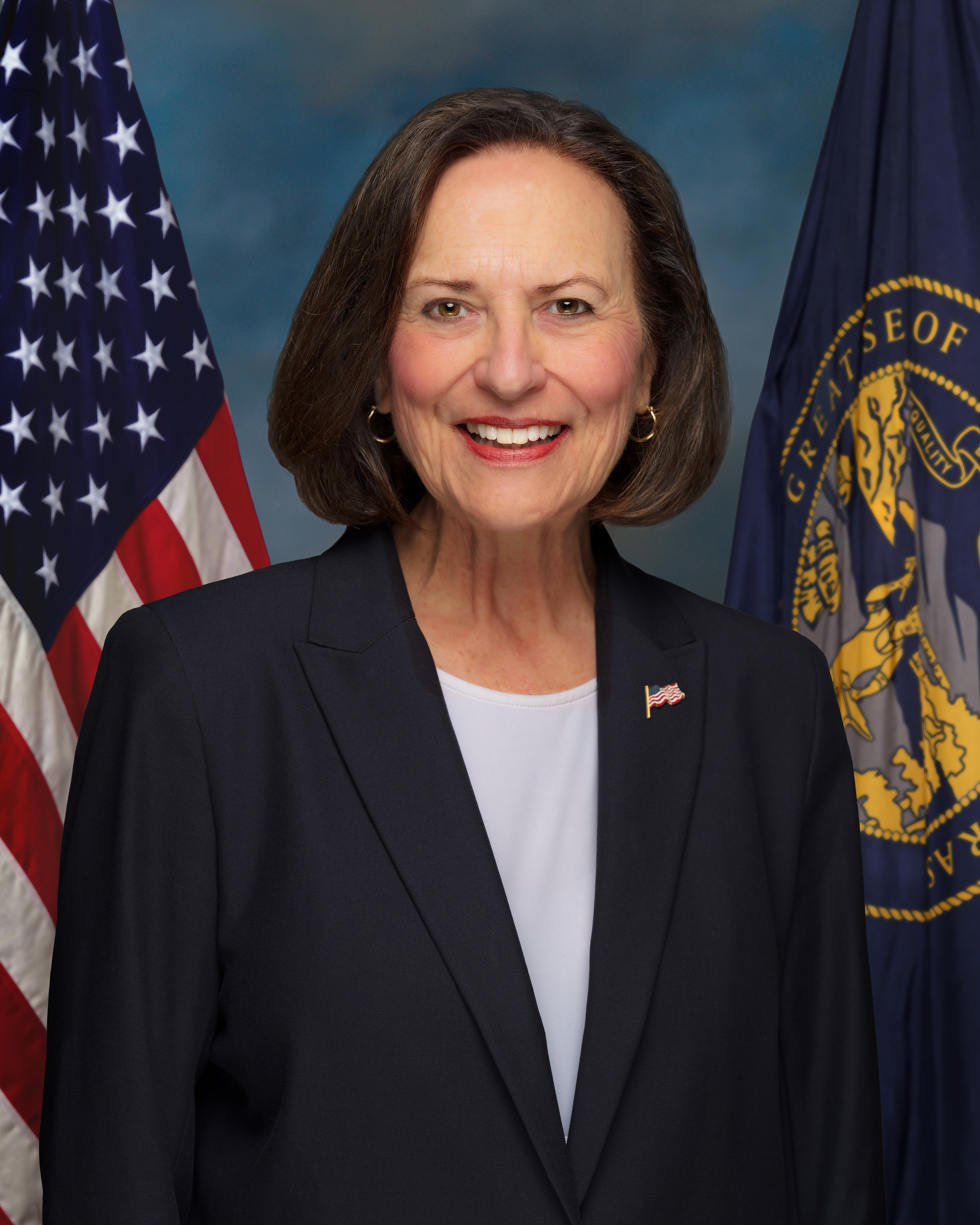
- Official portrait, 2024

Ranking Member of the Senate Rules Committee
- In office January 3, 2023 – January 3, 2025
- Preceded by: Roy Blunt
- Succeeded by: Alex Padilla

United States Senator from Nebraska
- Incumbent
- Assumed office January 3, 2013 Serving with Pete Ricketts
- Preceded by: Ben Nelson

Member of the Nebraska Legislature from the 43rd district
- In office January 5, 2005 – January 2, 2013
- Preceded by: Jim Jones
- Succeeded by: Al Davis

Personal details
- Born: Debra Lynelle Strobel; March 1, 1951 (age 75) Lincoln, Nebraska, U.S.
- Party: Republican
- Spouse: Bruce Fischer (m. 1972)
- Children: 3
- Education: University of Nebraska–Lincoln (BS)
- Website: Senate website Campaign website
- Fischer's voice Fischer on Judge John M. Gerrard taking senior status Recorded February 10, 2022

Debra Lynelle Fischer (née Strobel; born March 1, 1951) is an American politician serving as the senior United States senator from Nebraska, a seat she has held since 2013. A member of the Republican Party, Fischer served in the Nebraska Legislature from 2005 to 2013 and on the Valentine Rural High School Board of Education from 1990 to 2004. She is the third woman to represent Nebraska in the U.S. Senate (after Eva Bowring and Hazel Abel) and the first to be reelected.

Fischer was first elected to the Senate in 2012, defeating former Democratic U.S. senator Bob Kerrey after an upset victory against state attorney general Jon Bruning in the Republican primary. She was reelected in 2018 and 2024.

To date, she is the oldest female Republican U.S. Senator.

== Early life, education, and career ==
Fischer was born Debra Lynelle Strobel on March 1, 1951, in Lincoln, Nebraska. She is the daughter of Florence M. (née Bock) and Gerold Carl Strobel. Her father was the State Engineer/Director of the Nebraska Department of Roads under Governors Kay Orr and Ben Nelson and her mother was an elementary school teacher with Lincoln Public Schools.

In 1972, Strobel married Bruce Fischer, who she met at the University of Nebraska–Lincoln. She and her husband raised three sons on the Fischer family cattle ranch south of Valentine, Nebraska. In 1987, she returned to the university and completed her Bachelor of Science degree in education.

== School board (1990–2004) ==
In 1990, Fischer was elected to the Valentine Rural High School Board of Education, serving until 2004. Governor Mike Johanns appointed Fischer as a Commissioner to the Nebraska Coordinating Commission for Post-Secondary Education from 2000 to 2004.

== Nebraska Legislature (2005–2013) ==
=== Elections ===
In 2004, State Senator Jim Jones declined to seek reelection, and Fischer ran to succeed him in the 43rd legislative district, which was based in the state's Sandhills region. In the nonpartisan primary, she faced a crowded field of candidates, including Thomas County Attorney Warren Arganbright, rancher Kevin Cooksley, teacher Howard Gaffney, farmer Floyd Slagle, retired teacher Louis Stithem, and businessman Elmer Vogel. Fischer placed second, receiving 2,226 votes (25.1%) to Cooksley's 2,264 (25.5%). In the general election, she defeated Cooksley with 8,178 votes to his 8,050, 50.4%–49.6%.

In 2008, she won reelection unopposed. Nebraska's term-limits law precluded her running for reelection in 2012. Fischer resigned from the legislature on January 2, 2013.

Tenure

Fischer's district was geographically the largest in the Nebraska Legislature, comprising 12 counties and part of a 13th. During her tenure in the legislature, she did a weekly radio show on seven stations covering her district, and wrote a weekly column printed in several newspapers.

In 2007, Fischer helped lead a filibuster against a bill to create a statewide smoking ban for indoor workplaces and public places. Commonly known as the Nebraska Clean Indoor Air Act, the bill passed and was signed into law in 2008.

In 2009, Fischer was one of 14 co-sponsors of L.B. 675, which required abortion providers to display ultrasound images of the fetus at least one hour before performing abortions, in a position where the abortion seeker could easily view them. A spokesman for the National Right to Life Committee said the law was stronger than those of other states, which required only that the client be asked whether she wanted to see an ultrasound image. The measure passed by a 40–5 vote, and was signed into law by Governor Dave Heineman.

Fischer chaired the Transportation and Telecommunications Committee and helped pass the BUILD Nebraska Act through the Unicameral. This bill prioritized a quarter cent of the state sales tax for infrastructure projects.

== U.S. Senate (2013–present) ==
=== Elections ===
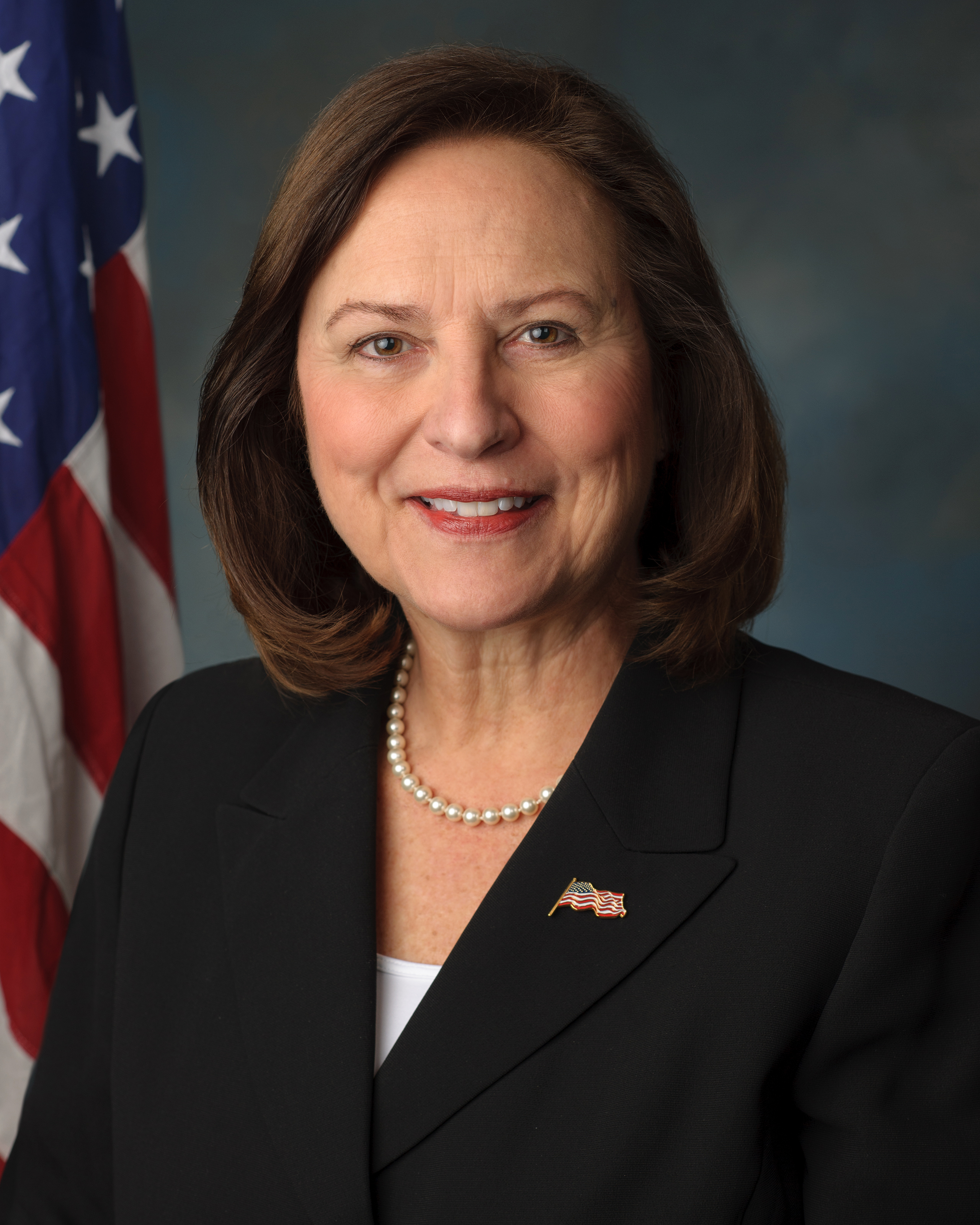
Deb Fischer's official portrait for the 113th Congress

==== 2012 ====
Primary

In January 2012, after incumbent Senator Ben Nelson announced his retirement, Fischer announced her candidacy for the U.S. Senate. The Republican primary campaign was expected to be a battle between Attorney General Jon Bruning and State Treasurer Don Stenberg; Fischer and three less well-known candidates were also on the ballot.

During the campaign, environmentalists and others criticized Fischer because her family's ranch near Valentine grazed cattle on federal land, leasing it for about $110,000 per year less than the market rate on private land. Opponents of federal grazing leases argued that she should relinquish her family's permit if she wanted to remain "morally consistent" with her message of less government. Fischer argued that the poor quality of federal lands and the restrictions that come with federal leases make it inappropriate to compare them to private leases.

During the campaign, Fischer was outspent by Bruning, who raised $3.6 million, and Stenberg, who spent $865,000. Fischer's campaign raised only $440,000. But Bruning and Stenberg spent much of their resources attacking one another; Fischer benefited from the damage that each did to the other's reputation. She was also aided by $725,000 in TV ads that the Club for Growth bought attacking Bruning. Shortly before the election, she was endorsed by Nebraska U.S. Representative Jeff Fortenberry and by 2008 vice-presidential nominee Sarah Palin, who recorded robocalls endorsing her; and a super PAC financed by former Omaha businessman Joe Ricketts paid for $250,000 worth of TV ads promoting Fischer and opposing Bruning.

Fischer won the primary with 40% of the vote to Bruning's 35% and Stenberg's 18%. She took a plurality of votes in 75 of Nebraska's 93 counties. Bruning won 15 counties and Schuyler businessman Pat Flynn received a plurality in his home Colfax County. Fischer and Bruning tied in Kimball and Sioux counties.

General election

In the general election, Fischer faced Democratic nominee Bob Kerrey, a former Nebraska governor and U.S. senator who was running for the seat he had held from 1989 to 2001.

During the campaign, Kerrey ran ads accusing Fischer of unprincipled conduct in the matter of a 1995 adverse possession suit, whereby the Fischers had attempted to obtain title to 104 acres (42 ha) of land adjoining their property. Fischer maintained that their intent in filing the suit was to obtain a more manageable boundary for their ranch after repeated attempts to purchase the land had failed; according to an Omaha World-Herald analysis, the Kerrey campaign's statements about Fischer's actions in the Legislature failed to mention her support for a compromise measure that would have allowed NGPC to buy the land. A Fischer spokesman accused Kerrey of "reckless disregard for the truth" and "gutter politics" in the matter.

Fischer defeated Kerrey, 455,593 votes (58%) to 332,979 (42%). She won mainly by swamping Kerrey in the state's rural areas. She won 88 of Nebraska's 93 counties. Kerrey won only Douglas, Lancaster, Saline, Thurston, and Dakota Counties.

==== 2018 ====
Fischer was reelected to the Senate in 2018, defeating Democratic nominee Jane Raybould by a significant margin.

==== 2024 ====
Fischer ran for reelection in 2024. She defeated Arron Kowalski in the Republican primary election in May. She faced independent candidate Dan Osborn, a former union leader, in the November general election. Fischer defeated Osborn by 6.7 points, after being reelected by 19 points in 2018.

=== Tenure ===
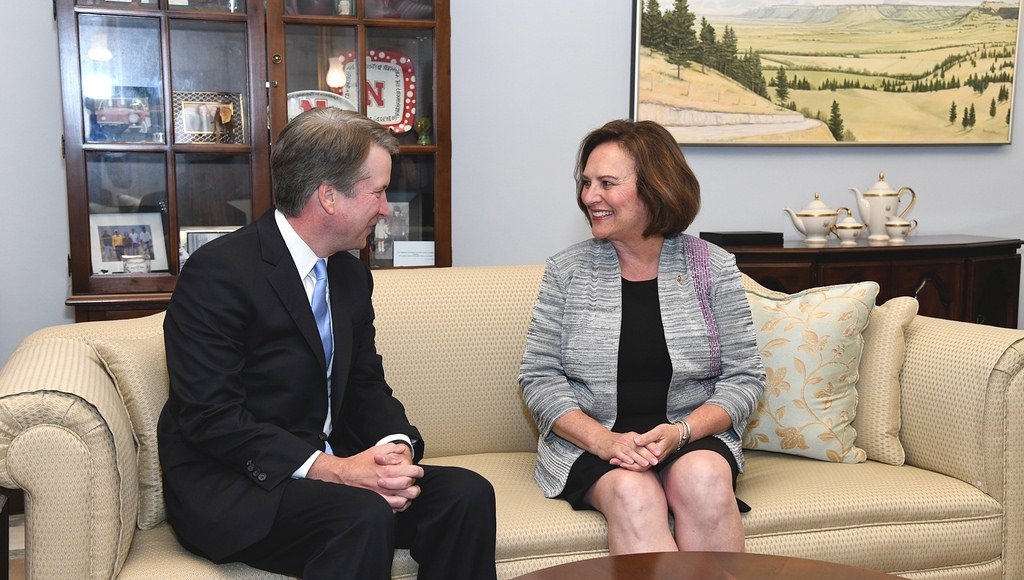
Fischer with Judge Brett Kavanaugh in July 2018

Fischer became the third female U.S. senator in Nebraska's history, and the first since 1954. She was the first elected to a full term: of the earlier woman senators, Eva Bowring was appointed in 1954 to occupy the seat vacated by Dwight Griswold's death until a special election could be held to replace him later that year; Hazel Abel won that special election to finish Griswold's term, but did not seek a full term.

=== Committee assignments ===
- Committee on Agriculture, Nutrition, and Forestry
  - Subcommittee on Livestock, Marketing, and Agriculture Security
- Committee on Armed Services
  - Subcommittee on Emerging Threats and Capabilities
  - Subcommittee on Readiness and Management Support
  - Subcommittee on Strategic Forces (Ranking Member)
- Committee on Commerce, Science and Transportation
  - Subcommittee on Aviation Operations, Safety, and Security
  - Subcommittee on Competitiveness, Innovation, and Export Promotion
  - Subcommittee on Consumer Protection, Product Safety, and Insurance
  - Subcommittee on Oceans, Atmosphere, Fisheries, and Coast Guard
  - Subcommittee on Surface Transportation and Merchant Marine Infrastructure, Safety, and Security (Ranking Member)
- Committee on Rules and Administration
- Select Committee on Ethics

== Political positions ==
=== Abortion ===
Fischer supports a national abortion ban without exceptions for rape or incest. She supported the 2022 overturning of Roe v. Wade.

=== Climate change ===
Fischer rejects conclusions by the international scientific community that human emissions of greenhouse gases are the primary cause of global warming in recent decades. In May 2015, a legislative aide said, "the senator acknowledges the climate is changing but believes it is due to natural cycles."

=== Foreign policy ===
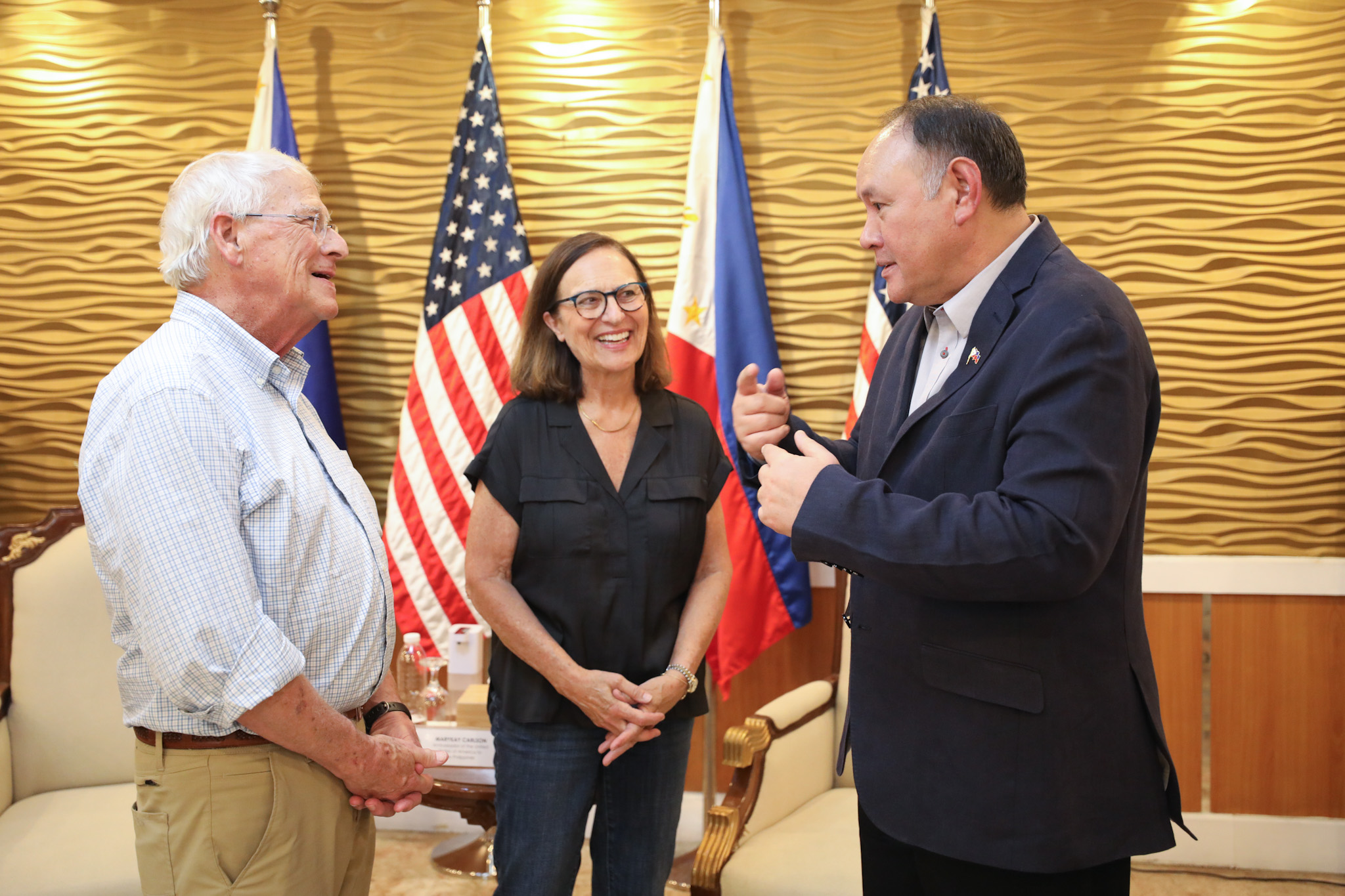
Fischer with Senator Roger Wicker (R-MS) and Philippine Defense Secretary Gilbert Teodoro in Manila in August 2025

Fischer has advocated modernizing the U.S. nuclear triad and increasing defense spending to deter China, Iran, and Russia. She has sometimes opposed efforts to scale back U.S. military authorities; in 2023, she was one of 30 senators to vote against repealing the 2002 Authorization for Use of Military Force Against Iraq.

In 2022, Fischer voted to ratify the accession of Finland and Sweden into NATO, joining the near-unanimous Senate approval of their membership. In 2023, she backed a bipartisan amendment (to the 2024 defense authorization act)—adopted 65–28—that requires the President to obtain congressional consent before withdrawing the United States from NATO. In August 2025, Fischer joined Armed Services Committee chairperson Roger Wicker on a visit to Taiwan, where she condemned the Chinese government's attempts to "threaten, to pressure, and [to] isolate Taiwan". During that trip, she affirmed U.S. support for Taiwan's self-determination and security amid rising tensions with China. Fischer has promoted measures to strengthen U.S. military readiness in the Indo-Pacific, such as expanding ammunition stockpiles and capabilities to counter China's growing influence.

Fischer supported the second Donald Trump administration's trade wars.

=== Gun access ===
After the 2016 Orlando nightclub shooting, Fischer said any legislative proposals to restrict people on the terrorist watchlist from buying guns would not stop mass shootings. She said that preventing self-radicalization was more important than restricting gun access.

=== Health care ===
Fischer supports repealing the Affordable Care Act (also known as Obamacare) and has voted accordingly.

=== LGBTQ rights ===
In June 2020, Fischer expressed support for the Supreme Court decision in Bostock v. Clayton County that "extended Civil Rights Act protections to gay, lesbian and transgender workers", saying, "It's important that we recognize that all Americans have equal rights under our Constitution. I'm fine with it." She voted against the Respect for Marriage Act, which protects same-sex marriage.

=== 2020 presidential election ===
Before the January 6, 2021, United States Electoral College vote count, Fischer announced that she would vote to certify the election results. She was on Capitol Hill to participate in the count when Donald Trump supporters stormed the U.S. Capitol. During the attack, Fischer tweeted: "These rioters have no constitutional right to harm law enforcement and storm our Capitol. We are a nation of laws, not some banana republic. This must end now."

On May 28, 2021, Fischer voted against creating an independent commission to investigate the 2021 United States Capitol attack. In January 2024, she endorsed Trump's 2024 presidential election campaign.

=== Fiscal Responsibility Act of 2023 ===
Fischer was among the 31 Senate Republicans who voted against final passage of the Fiscal Responsibility Act of 2023.

== Personal life ==
Fischer is married to Bruce Fischer. They operate a family ranch, Sunny Slope Ranch, near Valentine, Nebraska. Their children own most of the stock in the family corporation, while the elder Fischers retain a minority share. In 2020, Fischer and her husband moved to Lincoln, Nebraska.

== Electoral history ==
2012 U.S. Senate primary election results, Nebraska
Party	Candidate	Votes	%
Republican	Deb Fischer	79,941	41.0
Republican	Jon Bruning	70,067	35.9
Republican	Don Stenberg	36,727	18.8
Republican	Pat Flynn	5,413	2.8
Republican	Spencer Zimmerman	1,601	0.8
Republican	Sharyn Elander	1,294	0.7
Total votes		195,043	100.0

2012 U.S. Senate general election results, Nebraska
Party	Candidate	Votes	%	±%
Republican	Deb Fischer	455,593	57.77%	+21.65%
Democratic	Bob Kerrey	332,979	42.23%	−21.65%
Total votes		788,572	100.00%	N/A
Republican gain from Democratic				

2018 U.S. Senate primary election results, Nebraska
Party	Candidate	Votes	%
Republican	Deb Fischer (incumbent)	128,157	75.79%
Republican	Todd F. Watson	19,661	11.63%
Republican	Jack Heidel	9,413	5.57%
Republican	Jeffrey Lynn Stein	6,380	3.77%
Republican	Dennis Frank Macek	5,483	3.24%
Total votes		169,094	100.00%

2018 U.S. Senate general election results, Nebraska
Party	Candidate	Votes	%	±%
Republican	Deb Fischer (incumbent)	403,151	57.69%	−0.08%
Democratic	Jane Raybould	269,917	38.62%	−3.61%
Libertarian	Jim Schultz	25,349	3.63%	N/A
Write-in		466	0.07%	N/A
Total votes		698,883	100.00%	N/A
Republican hold				

2024 U.S. Senate general election results, Nebraska
Party	Candidate	Votes	%	±%
Republican	Deb Fischer (incumbent)	499,124	53.19%	−4.50%
Independent	Dan Osborn	436,493	46.52%	N/A
Write-in		2,719	0.29%	+0.22%
Total votes		938,336	100.00%	N/A
Republican hold				

== See also ==
- Women in the United States Senate

Party political offices
Preceded by Pete Ricketts	Republican nominee for U.S. Senator from Nebraska (Class 1); 2012, 2018, 2024	Most recent
U.S. Senate
Preceded by Ben Nelson	U.S. Senator (Class 1) from Nebraska; 2013–present Served alongside: Mike Johanns, Ben Sasse, Pete Ricketts	Incumbent
Preceded by Roy Blunt	Ranking Member of the Senate Rules Committee; 2023–2025	Succeeded by Alex Padilla
U.S. order of precedence (ceremonial)
Preceded by Tammy Baldwin	Order of precedence of the United States as United States Senator	Succeeded by Martin Heinrich
Preceded by Elizabeth Warren	United States senators by seniority 43rd	Succeeded by Ed Markey
