= Mississippi flag referendum =

Mississippi flag referendum may refer to one of two referendums to change the flag of Mississippi.

- 2001 Mississippi flag referendum, unsuccessful
- 2020 Mississippi flag referendum, successful
