= 2024 United States Senate election in Mississippi =

- November 5, 2024
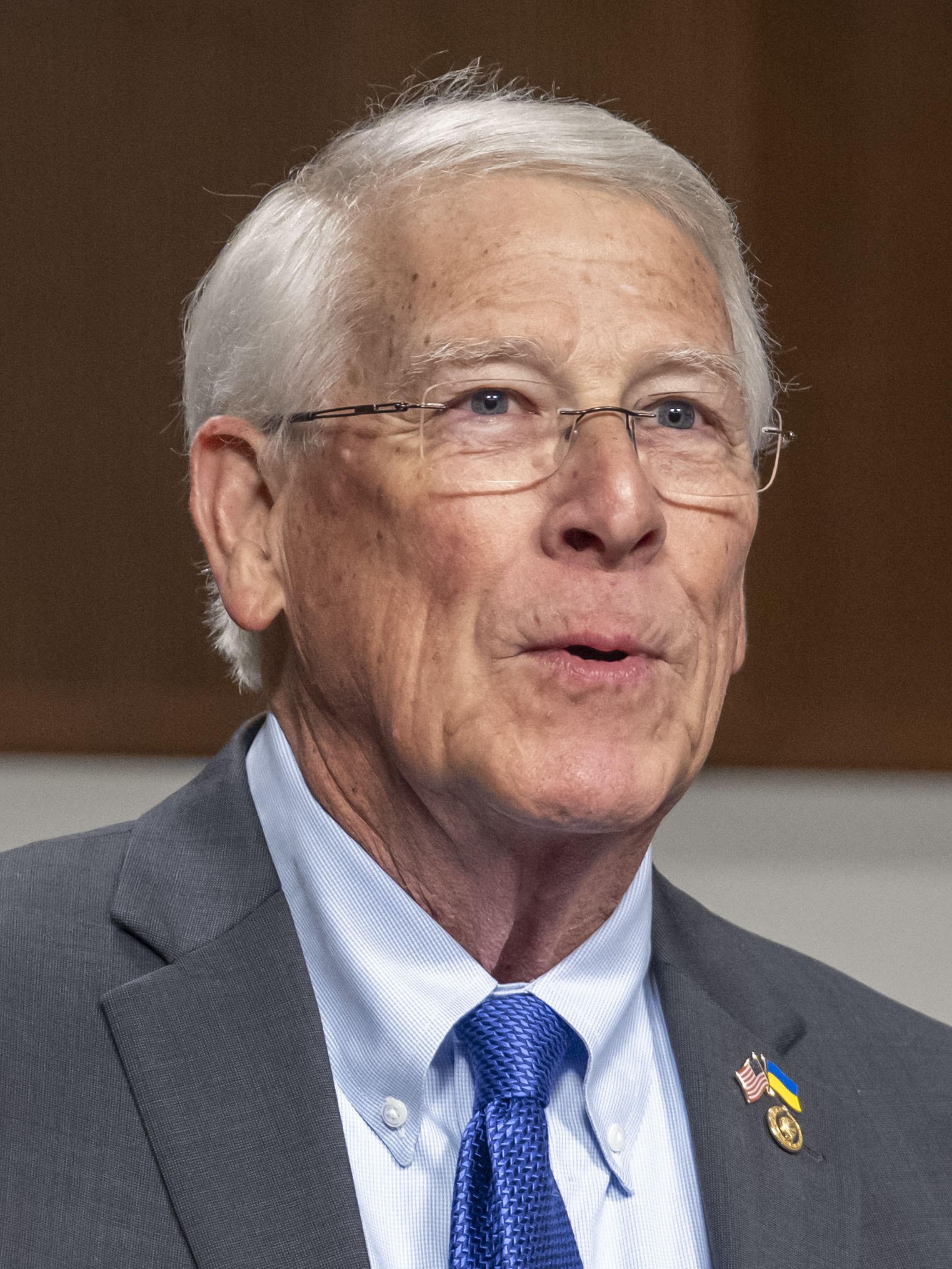

Nominee	Roger Wicker	Ty Pinkins
Party	Republican	Democratic
Popular vote	763,420	451,981
Percentage	62.81%	37.19%
- Wicker: 50–60% 60–70% 70–80% 80–90% >90% Pinkins: 50–60% 60–70% 70–80% 80–90% >90%
U.S. senator before election
Roger Wicker
Republican
Elected U.S. senator
Roger Wicker
Republican

The 2024 United States Senate election in Mississippi was held on November 5, 2024, to elect a member of the United States Senate to represent the state of Mississippi. Incumbent Senator Roger Wicker took office on December 31, 2007, as an interim appointee after Trent Lott resigned 13 days prior. Wicker retained his Senate seat in the subsequent 2008 special election, won full terms in 2012 and 2018, and sought a third full term. Primary elections took place on March 12, 2024.

Mississippi has been represented in the U.S. Senate exclusively by Republicans since 1989. Wicker easily won re-election to a third full term, overperforming Trump in the concurrent presidential election by 1.92 percent. Wicker improved on his performance, winning his largest margins ever and the largest margin for a Senate election since 2002 (when Thad Cochran was reelected without any Democratic challengers). Wicker flipped Issaquena, Jasper, and Marshall counties from 2018.

== Republican primary ==
=== Candidates ===
==== Nominee ====
- Roger Wicker, incumbent U.S. senator

==== Eliminated in primary ====
- Ghannon Burton, retired U.S. Marine Corps colonel
- Dan Eubanks, state representative

==== Endorsements ====
Roger Wicker

Executive branch officials

- Donald Trump, 45th president of the United States (2017–2021)

Organizations

- American Israel Public Affairs Committee (AIPAC)
- National Right to Life Committee
- United States Chamber of Commerce
- With Honor Fund

=== Fundraising ===
Campaign finance reports as of March 31, 2024
Candidate	Raised	Spent	Cash on hand
Ghannon Burton (R)	$212,429 (Note: $27,560 of this total was self-funded by Burton.)	$207,927	$4,501
Dan Eubanks (R)	$52,717 (Note: $15,000 of this total was self-funded by Eubanks.)	$52,717	$0
Roger Wicker (R)	$8,139,009	$6,397,660	$3,593,927
Source: Federal Election Commission

=== Results ===
Results by county Map legend: Wicker—40–50%; Wicker—50–60%; Wicker—60–70%; Wicker—70–80%; Wicker—80–90%; Wicker—≥90%; Burton—50–60%; Burton—60–70%

Republican primary results
Party	Candidate	Votes	%
Republican	Roger Wicker (incumbent)	152,086	61.40%
Republican	Ghannon Burton	61,387	24.78%
Republican	Dan Eubanks	34,238	13.82%
Total votes		247,711	100.00%

== Democratic primary ==
=== Candidates ===
==== Nominee ====
- Ty Pinkins, lawyer and nominee for secretary of state in 2023

==== Declined ====
- Brandon Presley, former Mississippi Public Service commissioner for the Northern District (2008–2024) and nominee for governor in 2023

==== Endorsements ====
Ty Pinkins

Organizations

- Freethought Equality Fund
- Population Connection Action Fund
- Vote Common Good

=== Fundraising ===
Campaign finance reports as of March 31, 2024
Candidate	Raised	Spent	Cash on hand
Ty Pinkins (D)	$324,980	$189,792	$135,188
Source: Federal Election Commission

=== Results ===
Democratic primary results
Party	Candidate	Votes	%
Democratic	Ty Pinkins	82,264	100.0%
Total votes		82,264	100.0%

== Independents ==
=== Filed paperwork ===
- Jon Taggart

== General election ==
=== Predictions ===
Source	Ranking	As of
The Cook Political Report	Solid R	November 9, 2023
Inside Elections	Solid R	November 9, 2023
Sabato's Crystal Ball	Safe R	November 9, 2023
Decision Desk HQ/The Hill	Safe R	June 8, 2024
Elections Daily	Safe R	May 4, 2023
CNalysis	Solid R	November 21, 2023
RealClearPolitics	Solid R	August 5, 2024
Split Ticket	Safe R	October 23, 2024
538	Solid R	October 23, 2024

=== Polling ===
Poll source	Date(s) administered	Sample size (Note: Key: A – all adults RV – registered voters LV – likely voters V – unclear)	Margin of error	Roger Wicker (R)	Ty Pinkins (D)	Other	Undecided
Change Research (D) (Note: Poll sponsored by Pinkins's campaign)	September 29 – October 3, 2024	565 (LV)	± 4.5%	48%	35%	7% (Note: "Would not vote" with 7%)	10%

=== Endorsements ===
Roger Wicker (R)

Executive branch officials

- Donald Trump, 45th president of the United States (2017–2021)

Organizations

- American Israel Public Affairs Committee (AIPAC)
- National Right to Life Committee
- United States Chamber of Commerce
- With Honor Fund
Ty Pinkins (D)

Organizations

- Freethought Equality Fund
- Population Connection Action Fund
- Vote Common Good

=== Fundraising ===
Campaign finance reports as of June 30, 2024
Candidate	Raised	Spent	Cash on hand
Roger Wicker (R)	$8,610,740	$6,794,208	$3,669,111
Ty Pinkins (D)	$499,484	$447,377	$52,107
Source: Federal Election Commission

=== Results ===
2024 United States Senate election in Mississippi
Party	Candidate	Votes	%	±%
Republican	Roger Wicker (incumbent)	763,420	62.81%	+4.32%
Democratic	Ty Pinkins	451,981	37.19%	−2.28%
Total votes		1,215,401	100.00%	N/A
Republican hold				

==== By county ====
County	Roger Wicker Republican		Ty Pinkins Democratic		Margin		Total
County	#	%	#	%	#	%	Total
Adams	5,219	44.31%	6,560	55.69%	-1,341	-11.38%	11,779
Alcorn	12,576	84.65%	2,280	15.35%	10,296	69.31%	14,856
Amite	4,514	66.30%	2,294	33.70%	2,220	32.61%	6,808
Attala	4,753	62.16%	2,894	37.84%	1,859	24.31%	7,647
Benton	2,522	66.33%	1,280	33.67%	1,242	32.67%	3,802
Bolivar	4,101	39.81%	6,200	60.19%	-2,099	-20.38%	10,301
Calhoun	4,402	74.43%	1,512	25.57%	2,890	48.87%	5,914
Carroll	3,746	73.11%	1,378	26.89%	2,368	46.21%	5,124
Chickasaw	4,121	57.68%	3,023	42.32%	1,098	15.37%	7,144
Choctaw	2,866	75.36%	937	24.64%	1,929	50.72%	3,803
Claiborne	719	20.19%	2,843	79.81%	-2,124	-59.63%	3,562
Clarke	5,151	68.67%	2,350	31.33%	2,801	37.34%	7,501
Clay	4,228	46.39%	4,886	53.61%	-658	-7.22%	9,114
Coahoma	2,146	32.13%	4,533	67.87%	-2,387	-35.74%	6,679
Copiah	6,388	54.72%	5,287	45.28%	1,101	9.43%	11,675
Covington	5,924	67.30%	2,879	32.70%	3,045	34.59%	8,803
DeSoto	49,073	62.92%	28,914	37.08%	20,159	25.85%	77,987
Forrest	17,104	60.38%	11,221	39.62%	5,883	20.77%	28,325
Franklin	2,852	70.33%	1,203	29.67%	1,649	40.67%	4,055
George	9,662	88.82%	1,216	11.18%	8,446	77.64%	10,878
Greene	4,712	84.10%	891	15.90%	3,821	68.20%	5,603
Grenada	5,689	58.78%	3,989	41.22%	1,700	17.57%	9,678
Hancock	16,797	80.36%	4,104	19.64%	12,693	60.73%	20,901
Harrison	49,863	66.35%	25,289	33.65%	24,574	32.70%	75,152
Hinds	25,901	29.93%	60,625	70.07%	-34,724	-40.13%	86,526
Holmes	1,456	21.79%	5,226	78.21%	-3,770	-56.42%	6,682
Humphreys	1,075	31.34%	2,355	68.66%	-1,280	-37.32%	3,430
Issaquena	304	51.09%	291	48.91%	13	2.18%	595
Itawamba	9,337	89.34%	1,114	10.66%	8,223	78.68%	10,451
Jackson	37,059	71.28%	14,932	28.72%	22,127	42.56%	51,991
Jasper	4,189	53.47%	3,646	46.53%	543	6.93%	7,835
Jefferson	693	20.83%	2,634	79.17%	-1,941	-58.34%	3,327
Jefferson Davis	2,383	44.52%	2,970	55.48%	-587	-10.97%	5,353
Jones	20,307	73.70%	7,246	26.30%	13,061	47.40%	27,553
Kemper	1,824	44.95%	2,234	55.05%	-410	-10.10%	4,058
Lafayette	14,761	63.60%	8,447	36.40%	6,314	27.21%	23,208
Lamar	20,984	75.35%	6,863	24.65%	14,121	50.71%	27,847
Lauderdale	16,873	62.46%	10,139	37.54%	6,734	24.93%	27,012
Lawrence	4,137	68.90%	1,867	31.10%	2,270	37.81%	6,004
Leake	5,229	62.66%	3,116	37.34%	2,113	25.32%	8,345
Lee	24,415	70.22%	10,352	29.78%	14,063	40.45%	34,767
Leflore	3,111	33.30%	6,231	66.70%	-3,120	-33.40%	9,342
Lincoln	11,599	73.98%	4,080	26.02%	7,519	47.96%	15,679
Lowndes	13,548	55.90%	10,690	44.10%	2,858	11.79%	24,238
Madison	34,181	61.74%	21,180	38.26%	13,001	23.48%	55,361
Marion	7,845	70.76%	3,241	29.24%	4,604	41.53%	11,086
Marshall	8,100	54.97%	6,634	45.03%	1,466	9.95%	14,734
Monroe	10,920	68.49%	5,025	31.51%	5,895	36.97%	15,945
Montgomery	2,671	61.42%	1,678	38.58%	993	22.83%	4,349
Neshoba	8,245	76.46%	2,539	23.54%	5,706	52.91%	10,784
Newton	6,657	72.21%	2,562	27.79%	4,095	44.42%	9,219
Noxubee	1,312	30.60%	2,975	69.40%	-1,663	-38.79%	4,287
Oktibbeha	9,498	53.29%	8,325	46.71%	1,173	6.58%	17,823
Panola	8,374	58.35%	5,978	41.65%	2,396	16.69%	14,352
Pearl River	20,157	83.40%	4,012	16.60%	16,145	66.80%	24,169
Perry	4,412	80.20%	1,089	19.80%	3,323	60.41%	5,501
Pike	8,205	53.51%	7,130	46.49%	1,075	7.01%	15,335
Pontotoc	11,556	83.38%	2,304	16.62%	9,252	66.75%	13,860
Prentiss	8,504	83.20%	1,717	16.80%	6,787	66.40%	10,221
Quitman	952	36.88%	1,629	63.12%	-677	-26.23%	2,581
Rankin	51,542	74.91%	17,267	25.09%	34,275	49.81%	68,809
Scott	6,122	62.46%	3,680	37.54%	2,442	24.91%	9,802
Sharkey	556	31.15%	1,229	68.85%	-673	-37.70%	1,785
Simpson	7,556	69.04%	3,389	30.96%	4,167	38.07%	10,945
Smith	6,158	80.86%	1,458	19.14%	4,700	61.71%	7,616
Stone	6,282	80.62%	1,510	19.38%	4,772	61.24%	7,792
Sunflower	3,074	39.75%	4,659	60.25%	-1,585	-20.50%	7,733
Tallahatchie	2,478	49.32%	2,546	50.68%	-68	-1.35%	5,024
Tate	9,225	72.51%	3,498	27.49%	5,727	45.01%	12,723
Tippah	7,927	83.64%	1,550	16.36%	6,377	67.29%	9,477
Tishomingo	7,824	88.29%	1,038	11.71%	6,786	76.57%	8,862
Tunica	827	31.50%	1,798	68.50%	-971	-36.99%	2,625
Union	10,484	85.49%	1,779	14.51%	8,705	70.99%	12,263
Walthall	4,158	64.20%	2,319	35.80%	1,839	28.39%	6,477
Warren	9,770	54.15%	8,272	45.85%	1,498	8.30%	18,042
Washington	4,926	34.37%	9,406	65.63%	-4,480	-31.26%	14,332
Wayne	6,022	66.20%	3,075	33.80%	2,947	32.40%	9,097
Webster	4,203	83.11%	854	16.89%	3,349	66.23%	5,057
Wilkinson	1,136	39.92%	1,710	60.08%	-574	-20.17%	2,846
Winston	4,937	58.94%	3,439	41.06%	1,498	17.88%	8,376
Yalobusha	3,609	61.67%	2,243	38.33%	1,366	23.34%	5,852
Yazoo	4,702	52.68%	4,223	47.32%	479	5.37%	8,925
Totals	763,420	62.81%	451,981	37.19%	311,439	25.62%	1,215,401

==== Counties that flipped from Democratic to Republican ====
- Issaquena (largest city: Mayersville)
- Jasper (largest city: Bay Springs)
- Marshall (largest city: Holly Springs)

==== By congressional district ====
Wicker won three of four congressional districts.

District	Wicker	Pinkins	Representative
1st	69%	31%	Trent Kelly
2nd	42%	58%	Bennie Thompson
3rd	66%	34%	Michael Guest
4th	72%	28%	Mike Ezell

== Notes ==
Partisan clients
