= Roger Wicker =

American attorney and politician (born 1951)

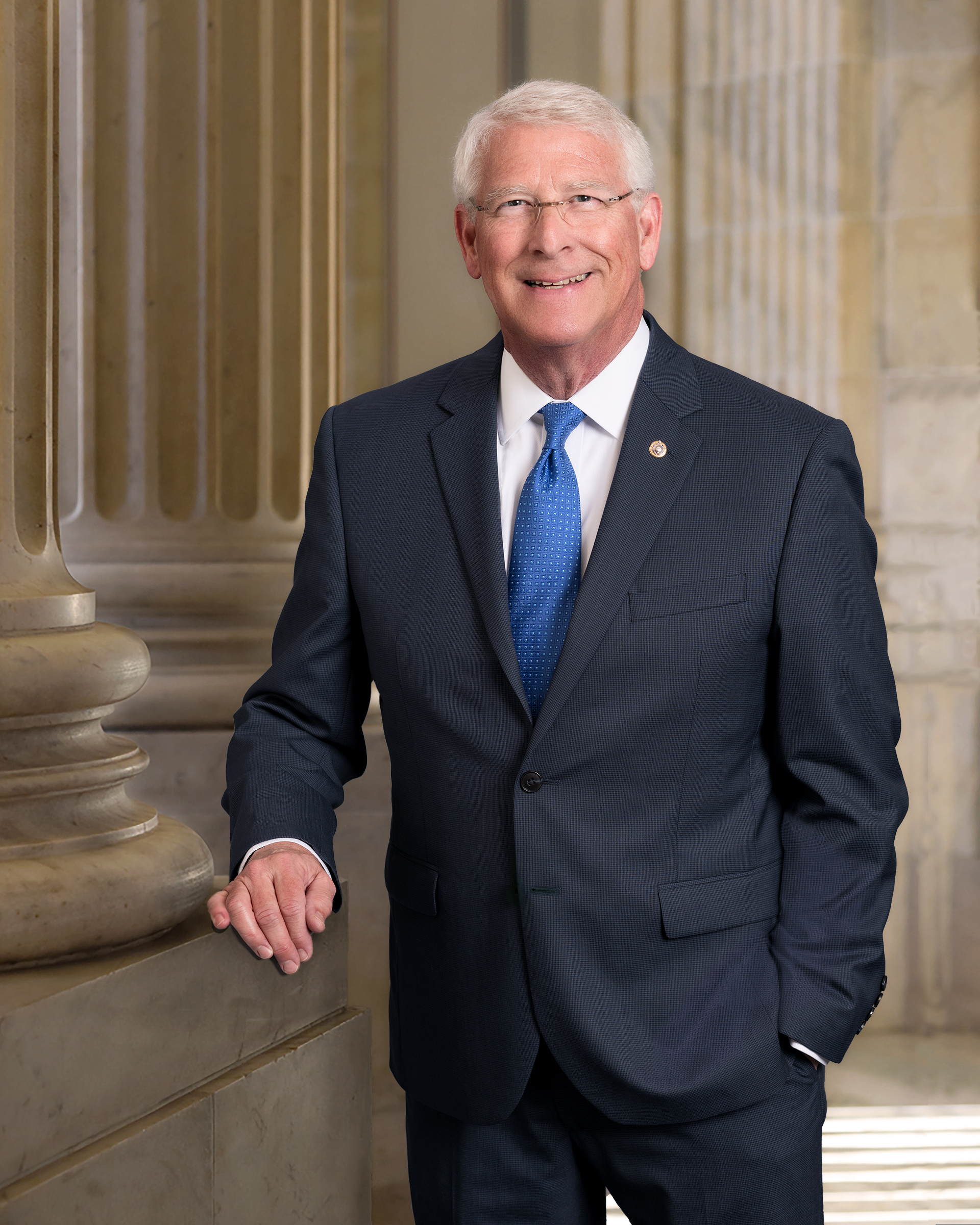
- Official portrait, 2018

United States Senator from Mississippi
- Incumbent
- Assumed office December 31, 2007 Serving with Cindy Hyde-Smith
- Preceded by: Trent Lott
Senate positions
Chair of the Senate Armed Services Committee
Incumbent
Assumed office January 3, 2025
| Preceded by | Jack Reed |
Ranking Member of the Senate Armed Services Committee
In office January 3, 2023 – January 3, 2025
| Preceded by | Jim Inhofe |
| Succeeded by | Jack Reed |
Ranking Member of the Senate Commerce Committee
In office February 3, 2021 – January 3, 2023
| Preceded by | Maria Cantwell |
| Succeeded by | Ted Cruz |
Chair of the Senate Commerce Committee
In office January 3, 2019 – February 3, 2021
| Preceded by | John Thune |
| Succeeded by | Maria Cantwell |
Chair of the National Republican Senatorial Committee
In office January 3, 2015 – January 3, 2017
| Leader | Mitch McConnell |
| Preceded by | Jerry Moran |
| Succeeded by | Cory Gardner |

Member of the U.S. House of Representatives from Mississippi's 1st district
- In office January 3, 1995 – December 31, 2007
- Preceded by: Jamie Whitten
- Succeeded by: Travis Childers

Member of the Mississippi State Senate from the 6th district
- In office January 5, 1988 – January 3, 1995
- Preceded by: Perrin H. Purvis
- Succeeded by: Alan Nunnelee

Personal details
- Born: Roger Frederick Wicker; July 5, 1951 (age 75) Pontotoc, Mississippi, U.S.
- Party: Republican
- Spouse: Gayle Long (m. 1975)
- Children: 3
- Education: University of Mississippi (BA, JD)
- Website: Senate website Campaign website

Military service
- Allegiance: United States
- Branch/service: United States Air Force; Air Force Reserve
- Years of service: 1976–1980 (active); 1980–2004 (reserve)
- Rank: Lieutenant Colonel
- Unit: United States Air Force Judge Advocate General's Corps
- Roger Wicker's voice Roger Wicker supporting the United States Innovation and Competition Act; Recorded May 20, 2021

Roger Frederick Wicker (born July 5, 1951) is an American politician, attorney, and former Air Force officer serving as the senior United States senator from Mississippi, a seat he has held since 2007. A member of the Republican Party, Wicker was a Mississippi State Senator from 1988 to 1995 and the U.S. representative from Mississippi's 1st congressional district from 1995 until 2007.

Born in Pontotoc, Mississippi, Wicker is a graduate of the University of Mississippi and the University of Mississippi School of Law. He was an officer in the United States Air Force from 1976 to 1980 and a member of the United States Air Force Reserves from 1980 to 2003. During the 1980s, he worked as a political counselor to then-Congressman Trent Lott on the House Rules Committee. In 1987, Wicker was elected to the Mississippi State Senate, representing the 6th district, which included Tupelo.

Wicker was elected to the U.S. House of Representatives in 1994, succeeding retiring 27-term Democratic Congressman Jamie Whitten. Wicker served in the House from 1995 to 2007, when he was appointed to the Senate by Governor Haley Barbour to fill the seat vacated by Lott. Wicker subsequently won a special election for the remainder of the term in 2008 and was reelected to a full term in 2012. Wicker served as chair of the National Republican Senatorial Committee from 2015 to 2017 and is a deputy Republican whip. He became the state's senior senator in 2018, when Thad Cochran resigned, and was reelected later that year, defeating Democratic nominee David Baria. He was reelected again in 2024, defeating Democratic nominee Ty Pinkins.

Wicker serves on four committees in the 119th Congress: the Commerce, Science, and Transportation Committee, the Environment and Public Works Committee, the Rules Committee, and the Senate Armed Services Committee, which he chairs.

== Early life and education ==
Wicker was born on July 5, 1951, in Pontotoc, Mississippi, to Wordna Glen (née Threadgill) and Thomas Frederick "Fred" Wicker, a lawyer and onetime Mississippi state senator. At age 16, Wicker worked as a United States House of Representatives page for Representative Jamie L. Whitten of Mississippi's 1st congressional district. He graduated from Pontotoc High School in 1969.

Wicker attended the University of Mississippi, where he was a member of the Sigma Nu fraternity and student body president. He was inducted into Omicron Delta Kappa for his student leadership and academic merit. He earned a bachelor's degree in journalism and political science in 1973 and a J.D. degree in 1975 from the university. After graduation, Wicker commissioned into the United States Air Force as a judge-advocate from 1976 to 1980. Starting in 1980, he was a member of the Air Force Reserve Command; he retired from the reserve in 2003 as a lieutenant colonel.

== Early political career ==
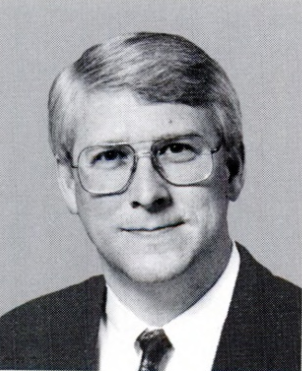
Wicker in 1995

Wicker began his political career in 1980 as House Rules Committee counsel to U.S. Representative Trent Lott. He was elected to the Mississippi State Senate in 1987, spending $25,000 on the race. He represented the 6th district, which included Tupelo, from 1988 to 1994. He amended a 1994 state Medicaid bill to authorize the Mississippi Attorney General to contract private attorneys on contingency.

== U.S. House of Representatives ==
=== Elections ===
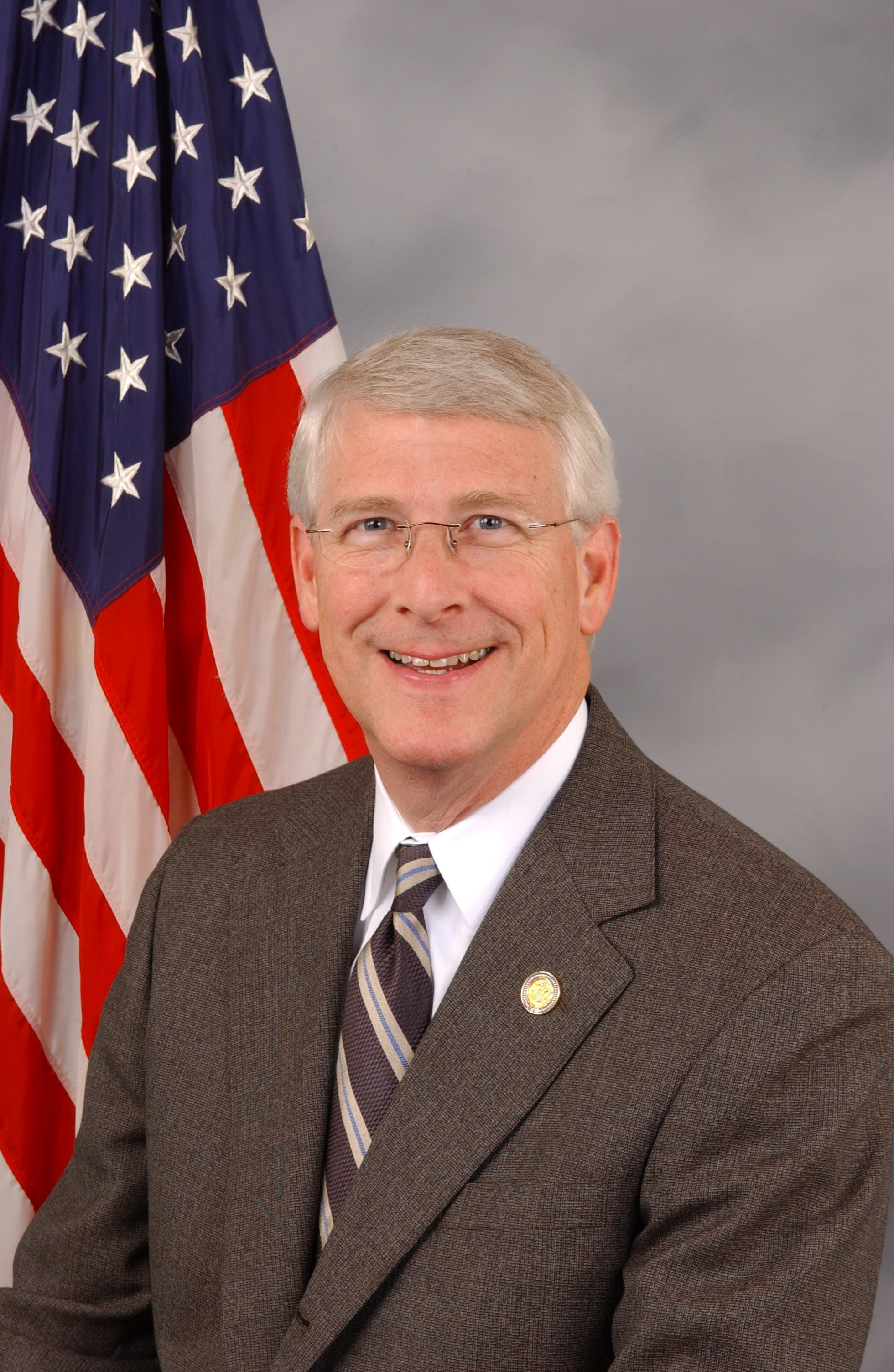
Official portrait of Wicker as U.S. Representative in the 2000s

In 1994, Jamie Whitten declined to seek reelection; he had represented the 1st District for 53 years, longer than any other congressman at the time. Wicker ran to succeed him, spending $750,000 on his campaign. He finished first in a crowded six-way Republican primary with 7,156 votes (26.62%) and proceeded to a runoff with attorney Grant Fox, who received 5,208 votes (19.37%). Former U.S. Attorney Bob Whitwell finished 600 votes short of the runoff with 4,606 votes (17.14%), 1992 nominee Clyde E. Whitaker came fourth with 4,602 votes (17.12%), 1986 nominee Larry Cobb came fifth with 4,162 votes (15.48%) and 1990 nominee Bill Bowlin took the remaining 1,147 votes (4.27%). In the runoff, Wicker defeated Fox, 11,905 votes (53.07%) to 10,527 (46.93%).

In the general election, Wicker defeated Fulton attorney Bill Wheeler, 80,553 votes (63.06%) to 47,192 (36.94%), making him the first Republican to represent the 1st district in over a century. This was not considered an upset, as the 1st has always been a rather conservative district (especially in the Memphis suburbs). The district had only supported the Democratic nominee for president once since 1956, when Jimmy Carter carried the district in 1976. Although Whitten had a nearly unbreakable hold on the district, it had been considered very likely that he would be succeeded by a Republican once he retired. Wicker was reelected six times without serious difficulty, never receiving less than 65% of the vote. In 2004, no Democratic candidate ran against him, only Reform Party nominee Barbara Dale Washer, whom he defeated, 219,328 votes (79.01%) to 58,256 (20.99%).

=== Tenure ===
Assuming office in 1995, Wicker was president of the freshman class, which included 53 other new Republican representatives, elected as part of the Republican Revolution. Wicker was a member of the House Appropriations Committee. He was also deputy Republican whip. Wicker worked on issues related to medical research and on economic development for his home state. He advocated private-public partnerships to bring investment to rural areas. Wicker also worked for veterans' issues while serving as a member of the Military Construction and Veterans Affairs Subcommittee. In his final year as representative, Wicker topped the list in earmarks. In 2007, Wicker was criticized after securing a $6 million earmark for a defense company whose executives had made significant contributions to his campaign.

== U.S. Senate ==
=== Committee assignments ===
- Committee on Armed Services (Chair)
  - Subcommittee on Airland
  - Subcommittee on Cybersecurity
  - Subcommittee on Emerging Threats and Capabilities
  - Subcommittee on Personnel
  - Subcommittee on Readiness and Management Support
  - Subcommittee on Seapower
  - Subcommittee on Strategic Forces
- Committee on Commerce, Science and Transportation
  - Subcommittee on Aviation Safety, Operations, and Innovation
  - Subcommittee on Communications, Media, and Broadband
  - Subcommittee on Oceans, Atmosphere, Fisheries, and Coast Guard
  - Subcommittee on Surface Transportation, Maritime, Freight, and Ports
- Committee on Environment and Public Works
  - Subcommittee on Clean Air, Climate and Nuclear Safety
  - Subcommittee on Superfund, Toxics and Environmental Health
  - Subcommittee on Transportation and Infrastructure
- Committee on Rules and Administration
- Commission on Security and Cooperation in Europe (Chair)

=== Caucus memberships ===
- Congressional Human Rights Caucus
- Congressional Immigration Reform Caucus
- Congressional Caucus on Turkey and Turkish Americans
- International Conservation Caucus
- Interstate 69 Caucus (Co-Chair)
- Sportsmen's Caucus
- Tennessee Valley Authority Congressional Caucus
- Rare Disease Caucus (Co-Chair)
- Senate Taiwan Caucus

=== Appointment ===
On November 26, 2007, Senator Trent Lott announced that he would resign before the end of the year to become a lobbyist. At a press conference on December 31, 2007, Mississippi Governor Haley Barbour appointed Wicker to fill the Senate seat Lott vacated on December 18, 2007. He was sworn in by the Senate clerk just before that news conference.

=== Elections ===
==== 2008 ====
Wicker ran for the remainder of Lott's term in the November 2008 special election against Democrat Ronnie Musgrove, Barbour's predecessor as governor. Wicker defeated Musgrove, 683,409 votes (54.96%) to 560,064 (45.04%). Wicker's resignation from the House also triggered a May 13, 2008, special election to fill the vacancy in the House, which was won by Democratic nominee Travis Childers.

==== 2012 ====
Wicker ran for reelection to a full term in 2012. He was opposed by Robert Maloney and Tea Party activist E. Allen Hathcock in the Republican primary, defeating them by 254,936 votes (89.17%) to 18,857 (6.60%) and 12,106 (4.23%), respectively. In the general election, he defeated Albert Gore, the Chairman of the Oktibbeha County Democratic Party and a distant relative of former Vice President Al Gore, 709,626 votes (57.16%) to 503,467 (40.55%).

==== 2018 ====
Wicker defeated Democratic nominee David Baria, a state legislator, with 58.5% of the vote.

==== 2024 ====
Wicker defeated two opponents in the Republican primary with roughly 60% of the vote and Democratic nominee Ty Pinkins in the general election with 62.8% of the vote.

=== Tenure ===
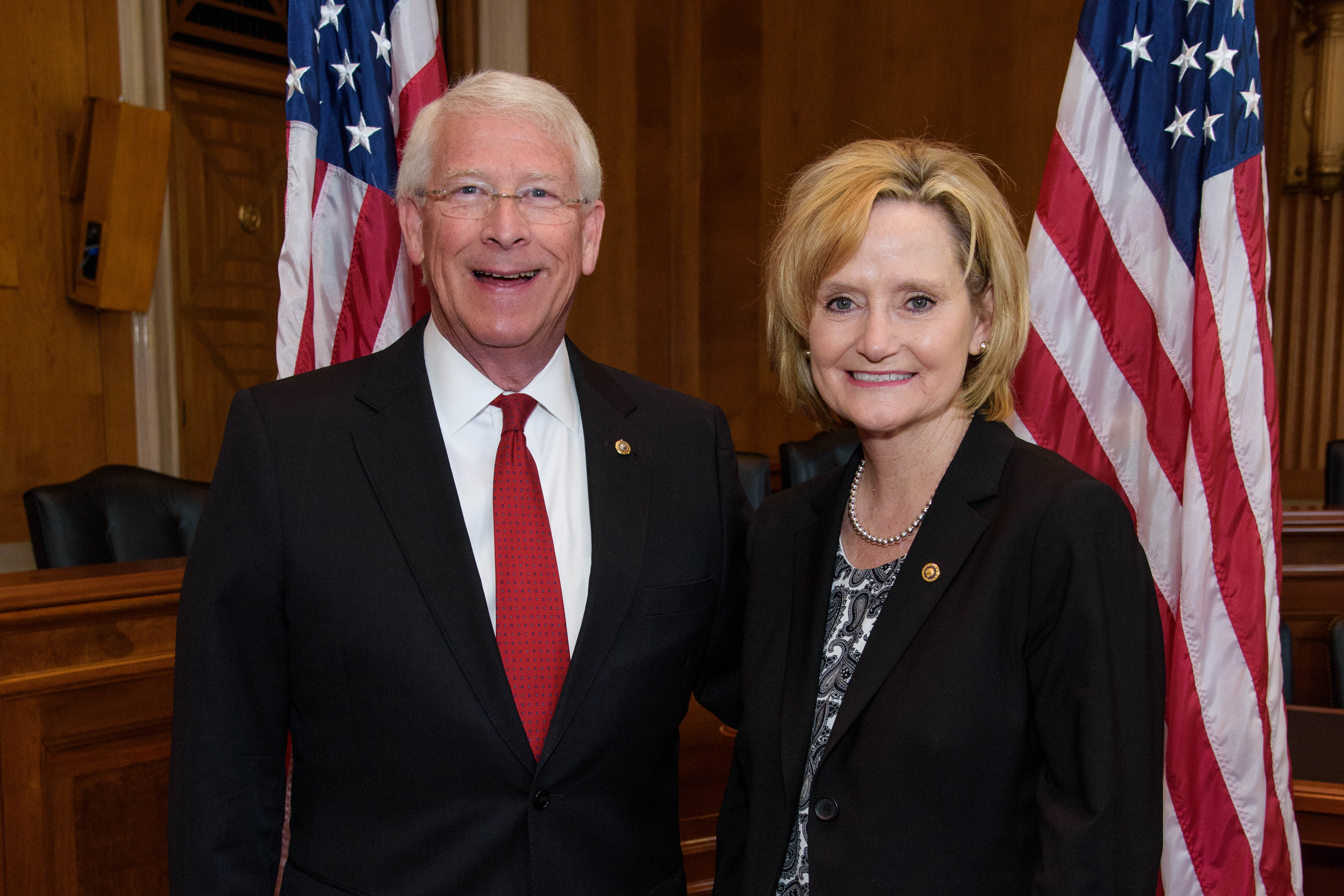
Wicker with Cindy Hyde-Smith of Mississippi in the Dirksen Senate Office building.

On September 16, 2010, President Barack Obama announced his intent to nominate Wicker as representative of the United States to the Sixty-fifth Session of the General Assembly of the United Nations. Wicker is a member of the Senate Republicans' whip team and repeatedly introduced a bill to overturn Roe v. Wade, the Supreme Court decision ruling abortion bans unconstitutional. Wicker called the Affordable Care Act the "great fight for the rest of this term, maybe our lifetimes" and later introduced a bill to enable state officials to challenge the law. He also amended a fiscal 2010 transportation spending bill to allow Amtrak passengers to carry firearms and ammunition in checked baggage.

Wicker and Representative Gene Taylor pushed amendments allowing purchasers of federal flood insurance to add wind coverage to their policies. As a member of the Commission on Security and Cooperation in Europe (Helsinki Commission), in 2012 Wicker worked with Senator Ben Cardin to enact a bill imposing penalties on Russians accused of violating human rights. The measure led Russian President Vladimir Putin to announce a ban on U.S. adoptions of Russian-born children. Wicker was one of three politicians targeted during the April 2013 ricin letters bioterrorism attack. On April 16, 2013, a letter addressed to him tested positive for the poison ricin as part of a series of letters. The letter was detected by postal officials and law enforcement and prevented from reaching the Capitol. The letter was tested three times, and each test confirmed the presence of ricin.

In July 2013, Wicker proposed that the Senate meet to discuss a controversial change to filibuster rules. The Senate held the private meeting in the Old Senate chamber to discuss Senate Majority Leader Harry Reid's threat of the "nuclear option", which would change the rules for Senate votes on Obama's executive branch nominees. Wicker said he hoped the chamber's bipartisan past could serve as an inspiration for the debate about the nuclear option: "I think there are concessions that can be made on both sides. And then I would just hope that, institutionally, we can get away from this mindset." Wicker supported the Bipartisan Sportsmen's Act of 2014 (S. 2363; 113th Congress), a bill related to hunting, fishing, and outdoor recreation aimed at improving "the public's ability to enjoy the outdoors". He said, "Mississippians know the importance of efforts to preserve our natural resources for future generations." On November 13, 2014, Wicker was elected chair of the National Republican Senatorial Committee for the 114th U.S. Congress.

Weeks after the 2014 Hong Kong class boycott campaign and Umbrella Movement broke out, demanding genuine universal suffrage among other goals, Wicker joined Senator Sherrod Brown and Representative Chris Smith's effort to introduce the Hong Kong Human Rights and Democracy Act, which would update the United States–Hong Kong Policy Act of 1992 and U.S. commitment to Hong Kong's freedom and democracy. "U.S. should stand steadfast with the people of Hong Kong in their fight to exercise self-determination," Wicker said, and "speak with a unified American voice in support of universal freedom and democratic values. The Congress and the Obama Administration should act to ensure China honors its longstanding obligation under international law to maintain Hong Kong's autonomy."

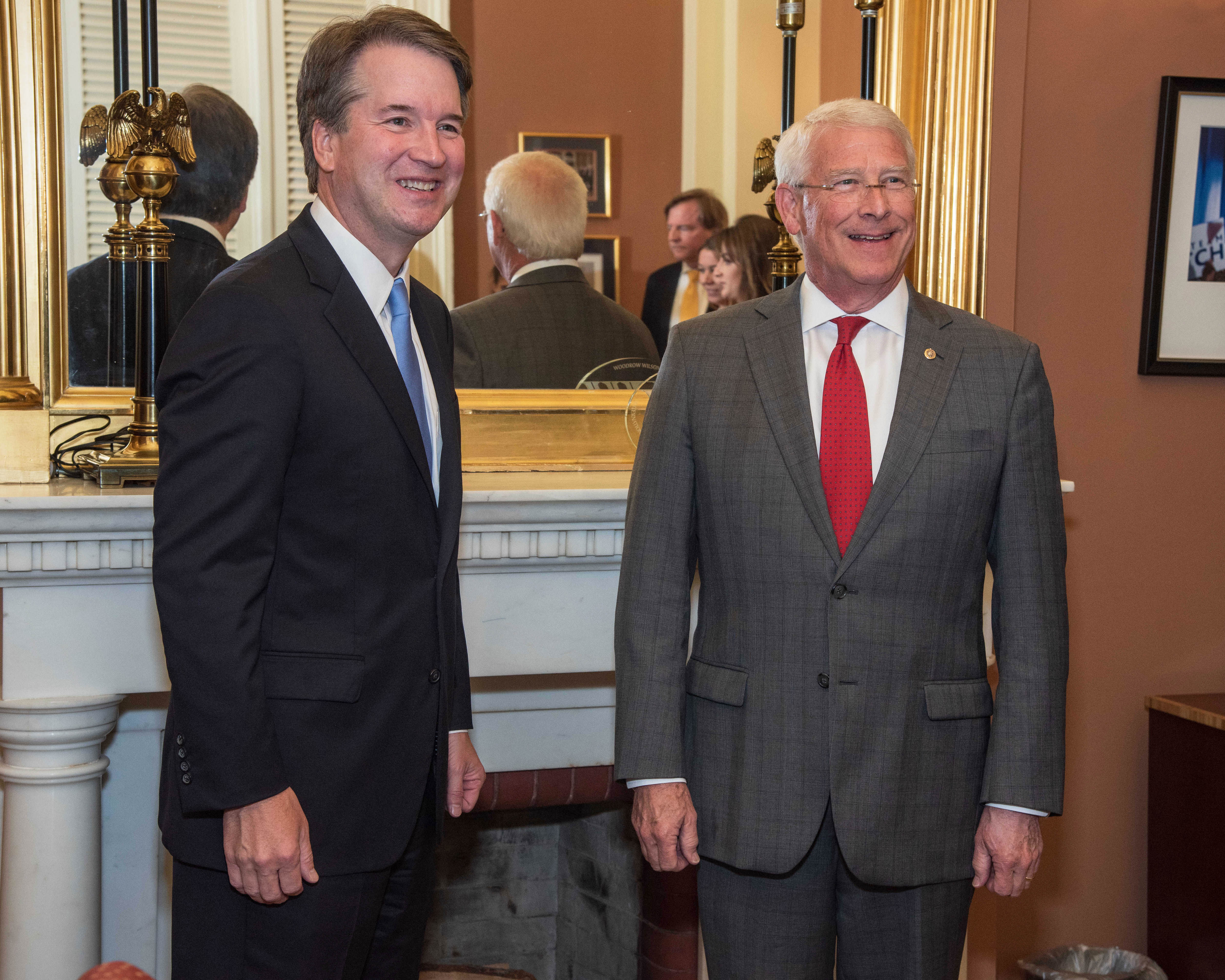
Wicker with Supreme Court nominee Judge Brett Kavanaugh

In March 2017, Wicker co-sponsored the Israel Anti-Boycott Act (s. 720), which made it a federal crime for Americans to encourage or participate in boycotts against Israel and Israeli settlements in the West Bank if protesting actions by the Israeli government. In May 2020, a group of Senate Republicans planned to introduce a privacy bill that would regulate the data collected by COVID-19 contact tracing apps. The COVID-19 Consumer Data Protection Act would "provide all Americans with more transparency, choice, and control over the collection and use of their personal health, geolocation, and proximity data", according to a joint statement. Wicker said the legislation also would "hold businesses accountable to consumers" if they were to "use personal data to fight the COVID-19 pandemic" and that the act would permit the creation of "platforms that could trace the virus and help flatten the curve and stop the spread—and maintaining privacy protections for U.S. citizens".

In September 2020, less than two months before the next presidential election, Wicker supported an immediate Senate vote on Trump's nominee to fill the Supreme Court vacancy caused by Justice Ruth Bader Ginsburg's death, saying that Senate Republicans had "promised to confirm well qualified, conservative judges" and that there was a "constitutional duty" to fill vacancies. In March 2016, Wicker had taken the opposite position by declining to consider Obama's Supreme Court nominee during a presidential election year, saying that the "American people should have the opportunity to make their voices heard before filling a lifetime appointment to the nation’s highest court."

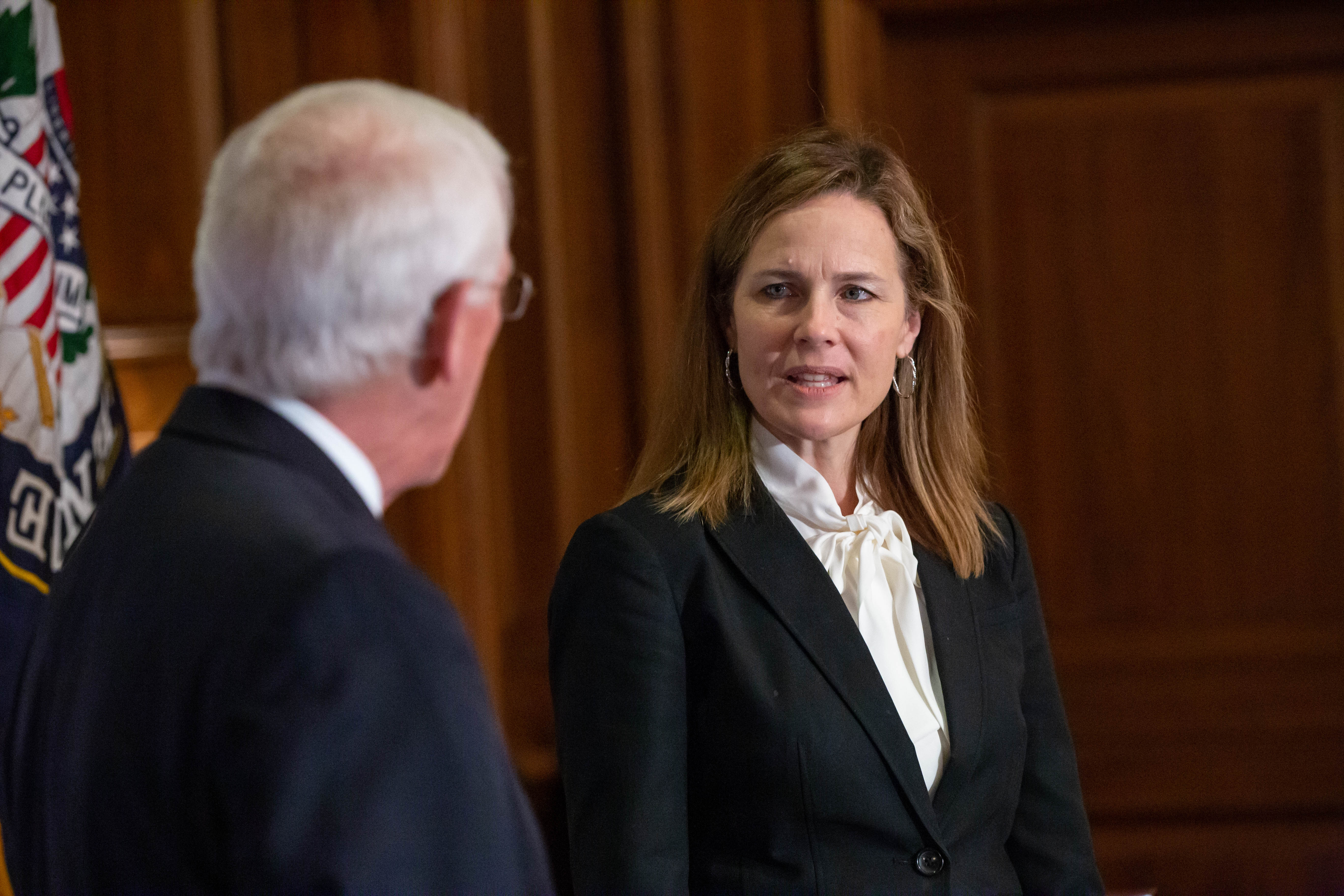
Wicker with Supreme Court nominee Judge Amy Coney Barrett

Wicker announced before the 2021 United States Electoral College vote count that he would vote to certify the election on January 6, 2021. He was participating in the certification when Trump supporters attacked the U.S. Capitol. When the Capitol was secure and Congress returned to complete the certification, Wicker voted to certify the count, with his senate counterpart, Cindy Hyde-Smith objecting to the count. In the wake of the violence and certification, Wicker called for perpetrators to be prosecuted "to the fullest extent of the law" and said, "we must work together to rebuild confidence in our institutions." Wicker opposed Trump's removal from office, encouraging a peaceful transfer of power on Inauguration Day.

In March 2021, after Congress passed the American Rescue Plan Act of 2021, Wicker highlighted on social media that the bill awarded $28.6 billion of "targeted relief" to "independent restaurant operators" to "survive the pandemic". In that post, he neglected to mention that he had voted against the bill. After President Joe Biden said in January 2022 that he planned to appoint a black woman to the U.S. Supreme Court, Wicker told Mississippi radio host Paul Gallo that the nominee would be a "beneficiary" of an affirmative action "quota", drawing a rebuke from the White House.

== Political positions ==
The Heritage Foundation gave Wicker a lifetime conservative rating of 59% (the average Senate Republican scored 84%). As of December 2017, Wicker ranks 14th of 98 in the Bipartisan Index compiled by The Lugar Center, which reflects a low level of partisanship. Wicker identifies as a fiscal conservative but has voted to increase federal spending for agriculture, infrastructure, and military projects throughout Mississippi.

Criticisms of Trump Administration

Wicker has publicly criticized President Trump's handling of the Iran War, calling Trump's efforts to reach a negotiated deal to end the war "ill advised". He said the United States must "finish the destruction of Iran's conventional capabilities." Trump responded to his critics by calling them "losers, who are critical about something they know nothing about."

In June 2026, Wicker released a statement in which he said of Trump's Iran deal, "it would make Iran's payoff under President Obama's 2015 deal look like a pittance by comparison."

Wicker also criticized Trump's handling of allies, saying, "It is not helpful when American leaders speak of our alliances with derision." Politico called Wicker's remark his "sharpest rebuke yet".

=== Foreign policy ===
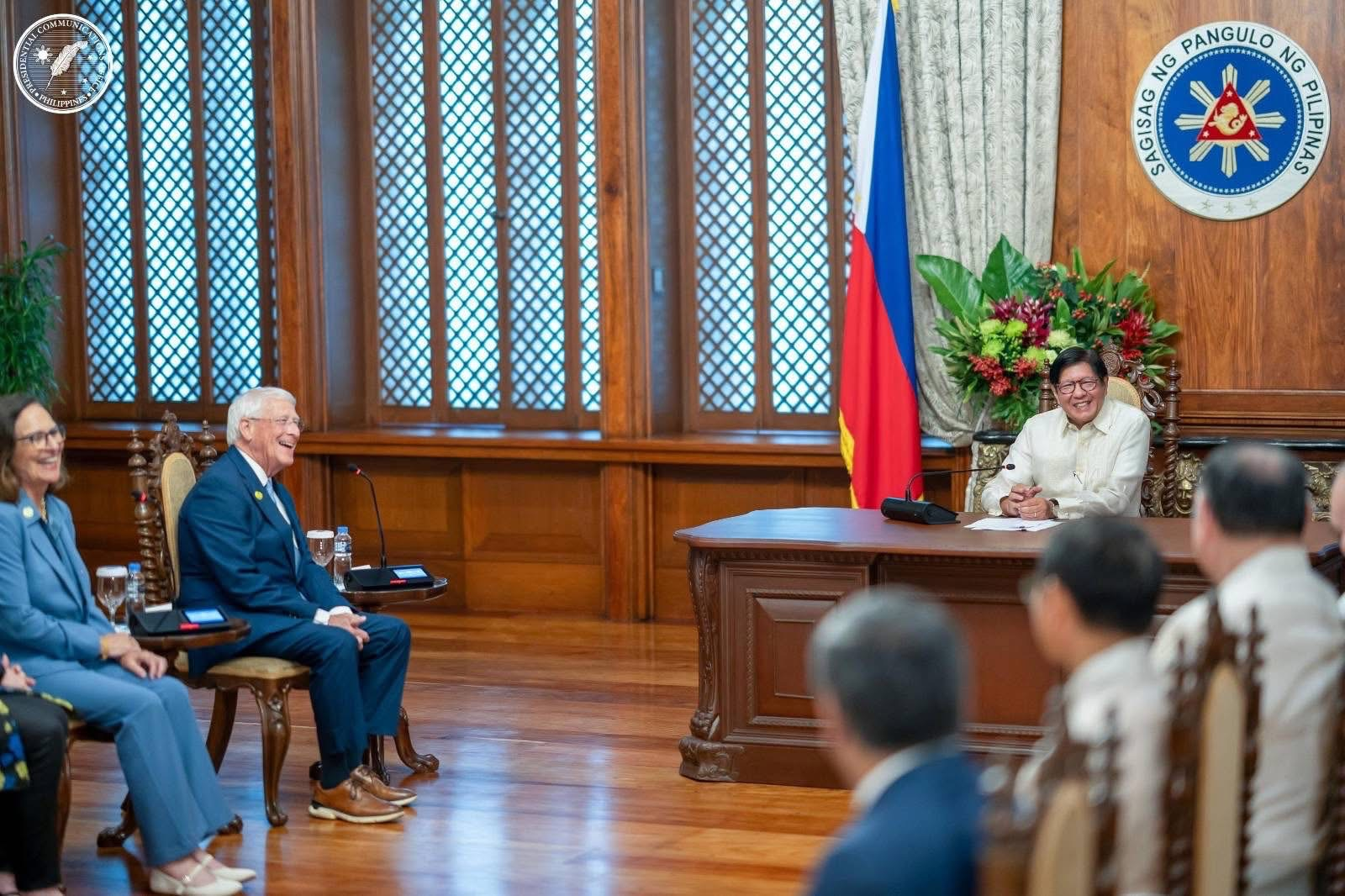
Wicker and Deb Fischer of Nebraska with Philippine President Bongbong Marcos in Manila, 2025

As a U.S. representative, Wicker supported the Iraq War and called it just. He believed it was necessary to remove Saddam Hussein from power. Wicker supported the 2001 United States invasion of Afghanistan and called the U.S. withdrawal in 2021 "one of the biggest foreign policy catastrophes in my lifetime". He also said, "we were better off with a Korea-like presence". Afterward, he cosponsored legislation that would have ended official diplomatic relations with Afghanistan's new Taliban government.

In December 2021, Wicker said the U.S. should consider a preemptive nuclear strike against Russia: "we don't rule out first-use nuclear action." This was two months before the Russian invasion of Ukraine began in February 2022. Also in 2022, Wicker supported implementing a no-fly zone over Ukraine, which the National Review called "a very bad idea".

Wicker supported the 2025 Iran strike and advocated ending all negotiations with the Iranian government. He said, "Our Commander-in-Chief should direct his skilled military leaders to finish destroying Iran's conventional military capabilities and eliminating any last remnants of their nuclear program." It is unclear whether Wicker supports a full U.S. ground invasion of Iran.

Wicker is an ardent Zionist and one of the most pro-Israel U.S. politicians. According to the American Jewish Congress, he "opposed the Iran Deal and opposed UN Security Resolution 2334", which affirmed that Israeli settlement activity violated international law. Wicker also voted for the Israel Anti-Boycott Act, supported the Anti-Semitism Awareness Act, and cosponsored the United States-Israel Security Authorization Act of 2018, which allocated military funding for Israel regardless of the Israeli–Palestinian conflict. He opposed opening a U.S. Palestinian consulate in East Jerusalem that would have answered to the U.S. State Department. Wicker opposed any form of humanitarian aid to Palestinians during the Gaza war.

=== Defense ===
Wicker has called for increasing the defense budget to 5 percent of the GDP.

=== Immigration ===
Wicker strongly supports expanding U.S. visas for Ukrainian refugees. He previously opposed Mississippi accepting Syrian refugees who fled from war-torn Syria. In 2026, Wicker opposed a Trump administration plan to establish a new Immigration and Customs Enforcement detention facility in Mississippi.

=== Ukraine ===
Wicker has been one of Ukraine's strongest Republican supporters. He voted each time for aid to Ukraine. In a press release, Wicker wrote: "President Reagan once called the Soviet Union 'the focus of evil in the modern world.' After two months of unprovoked brutality, it is obvious that the Kremlin remains one of the chief forces for evil in our world." On February 13, 2024, Wicker voted for Schumer's bill to appropriate aid for Ukraine, Taiwan, and Israel. The Washington Post characterized this as deserting the Republican Party, but the split was 22-28. On April 23, Wicker voted in favor of aid to Ukraine. It was remarked that "Reagan Republicans", including Wicker, Mitch McConnell, and House Speaker Mike Johnson, had split from Trump, the presumptive Republican nominee at the time. In May 2024, Wicker, John Thune, and John Cornyn urged Speaker Johnson not to agree to anything with Marjorie Taylor Greene, who was plotting to oust him, in order to save his position.

=== Confederacy ===
From 2015 until it was finally changed in 2020, Wicker sought to change the Mississippi flag, calling it offensive to many of his "fellow citizens". 64% of Mississippians voted to keep the flag in a 2001 referendum. Wicker supported nullifying that vote in 2020 and replacing the flag without a new referendum. While discussing Mississippi's previous state flag, Wicker said his Confederate military ancestors were "Americans" and "brave".

=== Climate change ===
In 2015, Wicker was the only U.S. senator to vote against an amendment declaring that climate change is real. The final vote was 98 to 1, with Senator Harry Reid, the Democratic leader from Nevada, not voting. The amendment affirmed that "climate change is real and not a hoax." In 2017, Wicker was one of 22 senators to sign a letter to President Trump urging him to withdraw the United States from the Paris Agreement. According to OpenSecrets, Wicker has received over $200,000 from the oil and gas industry since 2012.

In November 2023, Wicker initially supported the Foreign Pollution Fee Act co-sponsored by Lindsey Graham and Bill Cassidy. Endorsed by the Sierra Club, the bill (S. 3198; referred to the Senate Finance Committee) proposed imposing a carbon tariff on energy and industrial imports based on the good's emission intensity or carbon footprint as compared with the same domestic good to impose a carbon price on goods from countries with greater greenhouse gas emissions than the United States. Wicker subsequently withdrew co-sponsorship of the bill.

=== Gun law ===
Wicker's support for pro-gun legislation and gun rights has earned him an "A+" grade from the National Rifle Association Political Victory Fund (NRA-PVF). The NRA-PVF endorsed Wicker during the 2012 election. Wicker has said that he will filibuster any bill that he feels "infringes" on the Second Amendment, including weapon bans. He has received $21,350 in funding from gun lobbyists for his political activities. In 2009, Wicker introduced a bill allowing Amtrak passengers to check unloaded and locked handguns in their luggage. The law passed by a vote of 68–30. His rationale for the bill was that people's Second Amendment rights were violated if they could not bring guns on a federally subsidized train system.

One day after the 2015 San Bernardino attack, Wicker voted against a bill, co-sponsored by a Democrat and a Republican, that would make background checks mandatory when a person buys a gun. He said he voted against it because he feared it would have "opened the door to a national gun registry." In 2017, Wicker voted in favor of "a joint resolution of disapproval aimed at former President Barack Obama's executive action requiring the Social Security Administration (SSA) place beneficiaries on the National Instant Criminal Background Check System 'mental defective' list."

=== Secularism ===
Wicker asked the United States Navy to deny the admission of a secular humanist to the Chaplain Corps, saying, "It is troubling that the Navy could allow a self-avowed atheist to serve in the Chaplain Corps."

=== January 6 commission ===
On May 28, 2021, Wicker voted against creating an independent commission to investigate the January 6 United States Capitol attack.

== Political ratings ==
In 2023, Wicker received a score of 68% from the American Conservative Union. He has a lifetime rating of 82%.

== Personal life ==
Wicker has been married to Gayle Long since 1975. They have three children and six grandchildren. The Wickers reside in Tupelo, where Wicker is a deacon and a member of the First Baptist Church Tupelo choir. He previously served on the Board of Advisors for the Global Panel Foundation, a nongovernmental organization that works in crisis areas.

== Works cited ==
- Crockett, James R. (2014). Power, Greed, and Hubris: Judicial Bribery in Mississippi (reprint ed.). University Press of Mississippi. ISBN 9781617039188.

U.S. House of Representatives
| Preceded by Jamie Whitten | Member of the U.S. House of Representatives from Mississippi's 1st congressional district 1995–2007 | Succeeded by Travis Childers |
U.S. Senate
| Preceded by Trent Lott | U.S. Senator (Class 1) from Mississippi; 2007–present Served alongside: Thad Cochran, Cindy Hyde-Smith, Scott Colom (elect) | Incumbent |
| Preceded by Chris Smith | Chair of the Joint Helsinki Commission; 2017–2019 | Succeeded by Alcee Hastings |
| Preceded by John Thune | Chair of the Senate Commerce Committee; 2019–2021 | Succeeded by Maria Cantwell |
| Preceded by Maria Cantwell | Ranking Member of the Senate Commerce Committee; 2021–2023 | Succeeded by Ted Cruz |
| Preceded by Jim Inhofe | Ranking Member of the Senate Armed Services Committee; 2023–2025 | Succeeded by Jack Reed |
| Preceded by Jack Reed | Chair of the Senate Armed Services Committee; 2025–present | Incumbent |
| Preceded by Joe Wilson | Chair of the Joint Helsinki Commission; 2025–present | Incumbent |
Party political offices
| Preceded by Trent Lott | Republican nominee for U.S. Senator from Mississippi (Class 1); 2008, 2012, 2018, 2024 | Most recent |
| Preceded by Jerry Moran | Chair of the National Republican Senatorial Committee; 2015–2017 | Succeeded by Cory Gardner |
U.S. order of precedence (ceremonial)
| Preceded by Amy Klobuchar as United States Senator from Minnesota | Order of precedence of the United States as United States Senator | Succeeded by Jeanne Shaheen |
| Preceded by John Barrasso | United States senators by seniority 18th | Succeeded by Jeanne Shaheen |
