= David Baria =

American politician (born 1962)

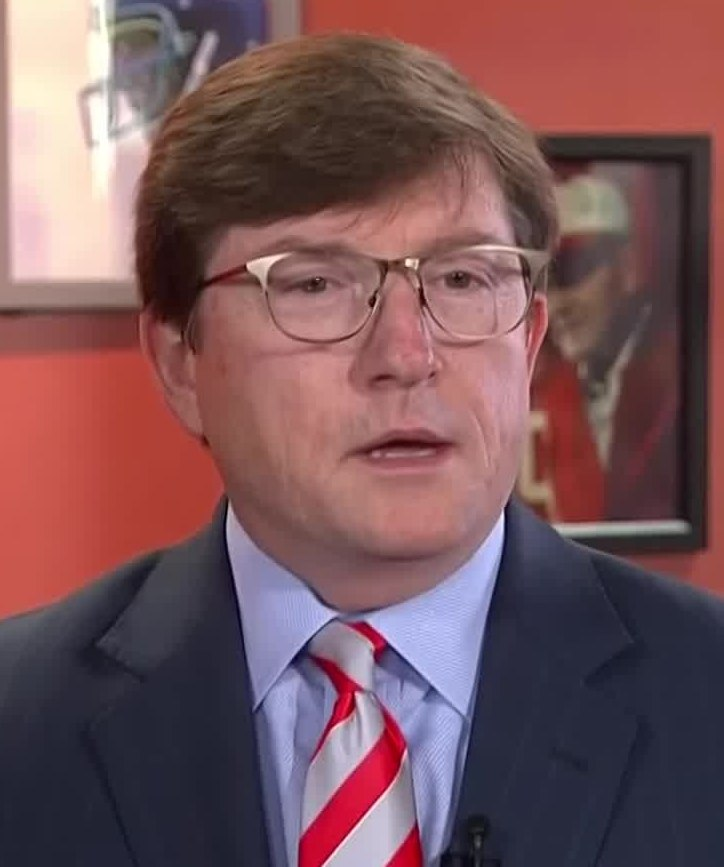

Minority Leader of the Mississippi House of Representatives
- In office February 3, 2016 – January 7, 2020
- Preceded by: Bobby Moak
- Succeeded by: Robert Johnson III

Member of the Mississippi House of Representatives from the 122nd district
- In office January 3, 2012 – January 7, 2020
- Preceded by: J. P. Compretta
- Succeeded by: Brent Anderson

Member of the Mississippi Senate from the 46th district
- In office January 8, 2008 – January 3, 2012
- Preceded by: Scottie Cuevas
- Succeeded by: Philip Moran

Personal details
- Born: David Wayne Baria; December 4, 1962 (age 63) Pascagoula, Mississippi, U.S.
- Party: Democratic
- Spouse: Marcie Fyke
- Children: 3
- Education: University of Southern Mississippi (BS); University of Mississippi (JD)

David Wayne Baria (born December 4, 1962) is an American politician and attorney. A trial lawyer by profession, Baria served as a Democratic member of the Mississippi House of Representatives representing the 122nd district until the end of the 2019 legislative session. He previously held office in the Mississippi Senate for the 46th district and was the House Minority Leader during his tenure in the state legislature.

Born in Pascagoula, Mississippi, Baria earned degrees from the University of Southern Mississippi and the University of Mississippi School of Law. His political career was inspired by Hurricane Katrina, leading him to first run for the Mississippi Senate in 2007. Baria later served in the Mississippi House of Representatives from 2012 to 2020, where he championed causes such as insurance reform, environmental protection, and medicaid expansion. In 2018, he was the Democratic nominee for the United States Senate election in Mississippi, finishing second with 39.5% of the vote.

== Early life and education ==
Baria was born in Pascagoula, Mississippi in 1962. He earned a Bachelor of Science degree in criminal justice from the University of Southern Mississippi in 1987 and a Juris Doctor at the University of Mississippi School of Law in 1990. While at the University of MIssissippi, he attended a summer program at Cambridge University.

After graduating, Baria worked as a trial attorney.

== Career ==
=== Mississippi Senate ===
Baria attributes Hurricane Katrina for his call to public service. In 2007, Baria ran for the Mississippi Senate to represent the 46th district. He defeated James Overstreet 77% to 23% and went on to represent the district from 2008 to 2011.

The American Lung Association and the American Federation of Teachers awarded Baria with legislative awards for his work in the Senate.

=== Mississippi House of Representatives ===
Baria ran for the 122nd district of the Mississippi House of Representatives in 2011, defeating his Republican challenger Dorothy Wilcox 58% to 41%. His district represented Bay St. Louis, Waveland, Pearlington, part of Kiln, and most of rural Hancock County. During his campaign, the Advance Mississippi PAC sent out misleading campaign material about his voting record. Baria filed a defamation suit against the PAC for falsely accusing him of voting to raise his pay, raise food taxes, and taking money from clients. Baria stated he would dismiss the case if the PAC apologized. The PAC's executive director and treasurer published an ad in two coastal newspapers apologizing for "false and defamatory ads" during the 2011 campaign.

He ran for reelection in 2015, narrowly defeating Republican MIckey Lagasse 51% to 49%. The election was highly competitive, with Governor Phil Bryant and Lieutenant Governor Tate Reeves campaigning and donating for Lagasse. In 2019, he announced he would not seek reelection, leaving office in January 2020.

Baria was selected as a Democratic Floor Leaders for the Mississippi House Democratic Caucus in 2012, and in 2016 his colleagues selected him to serve a four-year term as House Minority Leader. He was a founding member of the Mississippi Democratic Trust in 2016.

=== 2018 U.S. Senate race ===
On February 28, 2018, Baria declared his candidacy for the Senate seat held by Republican Roger Wicker. On June 26, he defeated venture capitalist Howard Sherman in a runoff to claim the Democratic nomination despite being considerably outspent. James Carville was an unofficial, unpaid campaign consultant and has held fundraisers in New Orleans for Baria. Baria finished second of four candidates, getting 39.5% of the vote.

=== Post-political life ===
Upon leaving the Mississippi House, he joined Cosmich Simmons & Brown as a partner in their Bay St. Louis office after 28 years of experience as a trial lawyer. His practice consists of insurance, business, construction, and personal injury litigation. He serves as a board member of the Centrist Democrats of America.

== Political positions ==
=== Insurance reform ===
Baria introduced several bills to cap the premiums that insurance companies can charge for homeowners and flood insurance. He introduced legislation to create a "Policy Holder's Bill of Rights," which would prohibit "anti-concurrent causation clauses," which allow insurance companies to avoid paying for any damage to homes where wind acts concurrently with flooding to cause damage to the insured property.

=== BP oil spill settlement ===
In 2015, Baria introduced a bill to require that 80% of the funds from the Deepwater Horizon oil spill be sent back to the Gulf Coast. The bill was defeated by the Republican controlled legislature, which opted to keep the money in the state's general fund. Baria renewed these efforts in 2017 with the support of several Republican legislators from the Gulf Coast, but they were unsuccessful.

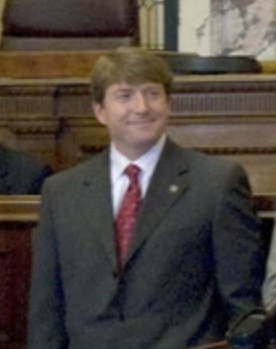
Senator David Baria in 2009 in the Mississippi State Capitol

=== Other policy positions ===
In 2010, Baria proposed bills in the senate offering tax incentives for homeowners who install solar power, as well as allowing net metering.

After joining the Mississippi House in 2012, Baria successfully sponsored a bill to require safety enclosures for swimming pools. That same year, he introduced several other bills, including bills to increase the death benefit payable to law enforcement officers and firefighters killed in the line of duty; authorize individuals to brew beer at home; create a "Patient's Bill of Rights; prohibit smoking in certain public places and private places of employment; and create a state version of the False Claims Act to allow whistleblowers who report fraud against the government to collect part of the award. All of these bills died in committee.

After controversy in 2012 over then-Governor Haley Barbour's pardon of two convicted murderers who worked at the Mississippi Governor's Mansion, Baria introduced legislation prohibiting governors from issuing pardons during the last 90 days of their term. The bill died in committee.

In 2015, Baria filed a bill to legalize industrial hemp production, and in 2017 Baria filed bills to raise the minimum wage and require equal pay for men and women performing the same work.

Baria penned an op-ed after the 2017 murder of a protester during the Unite the Right rally, calling for the state to remove the Confederate imagery from the Mississippi state flag.

In 2018, Baria voted for a bill to exempt recent college graduates from state income taxes if they stay in the state for three years after graduation from a four-year college or university and to grant them an additional two-year exemption if they buy a house or establish a business with at least one additional employee.

Baria has been a vocal critic of the corporate tax cuts passed by the Republican controlled legislature, stating that they deprive the state of revenue that could be used to pay for other state programs. He has also been a vocal supporter of expanding Medicaid to cover more than 300,000 Mississippians who lack health insurance. Baria also supports state-funded universal preschool and two tuition-free years of community college.

== Personal life ==
David Baria is married to Marcie Baria and has three children. He is Episcopalian. He is a member of the Rotary Club and Kiwanis Club.

Mississippi House of Representatives
Preceded by Bobby Moak	Minority Leader of the Mississippi House of Representatives; 2016–2020	Succeeded by Robert Johnson III
Party political offices
Preceded by Albert N. Gore	Democratic nominee for U.S. Senator from Mississippi (Class 1); 2018	Succeeded by Ty Pinkins
