= Dan Eubanks =

American politician (born 1970)

Member of the Mississippi House of Representatives from the 25th district
- Incumbent
- Assumed office January 5, 2016
- Preceded by: Gene Alday

Personal details
- Born: Daniel Paul Eubanks; June 11, 1970 (age 54); Hicksville, Ohio, U.S.
- Political party: Republican
- Spouse: Corey Moore-Luckhardt
- Children: 1
- Education: Kilgore College; Northwest Mississippi Community College; University of Arkansas (BA)

Daniel Paul Eubanks (born June 11, 1970) is an American politician, having represented District 25 as a Republican in the Mississippi House of Representatives since 2016.

== Biography ==
Dan Eubanks was born on June 11, 1970, in Hicksville, Ohio. He is a youth minister, and runs a small business. He was first elected to represent District 25 as a Republican in the Mississippi House of Representatives in 2015 for the 2016–2020 term. During his time in the Mississippi House of Representatives, Eubanks was a co-founder of the House's Freedom Caucus. He was re-elected for the 2020–2024 term. Eubanks put forward a bill in 2021 to charge abortion providers with murder. In 2022, Eubanks was one of six Republicans to vote against a bill to make equal pay for men and women a legal necessity.

He was a candidate in the 2024 United States Senate election in Mississippi, challenging incumbent Roger Wicker in the Republican primary. He lost, receiving 14% of the vote.

Eubanks is married to the former Corey Moore-Luckhardt.
