= Robert Johnson III =

American politician

Robert Johnson

Minority Leader of the Mississippi House of Representatives
- Incumbent
- Assumed office January 7, 2020
- Preceded by: David Baria

Member of the Mississippi House of Representatives from the 94th district
- Incumbent
- Assumed office 2004
- Preceded by: Phillip West

Member of the Mississippi Senate from the 38th district
- In office 1993–2003
- Preceded by: Pat Welch
- Succeeded by: Kelvin Butler

Personal details
- Born: Robert Lee Johnson III; November 29, 1958 (age 67) Natchez, Mississippi, U.S.
- Party: Democratic
- Spouse: Evelyn Joiner (m. 1991)
- Education: University of Illinois, Urbana-Champaign (BA, JD)

Robert Lee Johnson III (born November 29, 1958) is an American politician. He first served as a state senator before becoming a member of the Mississippi House of Representatives from the 94th District, being first elected in 2004. He has been the Minority Leader of the State House since 2020.

== Early life ==
Robert L. Johnson III was born on November 29, 1958 in Natchez, Mississippi. When he was young, Johnson would help his father, who was a bricklayer and cattle rancher, with work. Johnson's mother was a school teacher, later retiring as an assistant superintendent.

Johnson graduated from North Natchez High School and got a scholarship to Washington University in St. Louis. He was there for three years and transferred to the University of Illinois Urbana-Champaign, receiving a degree in political science and urban studies. He received a J.D. from the same school and interned during the summers at the attorney general's office in Mississippi.

== Career ==
In 1986, Johnson returned to Mississippi, where he worked for Edwin Pittman in the attorney general's office. He worked for Mike Moore before starting his own private practice in 1989.

He is a member of the Mississippi Bar Association and the Mississippi Trial Lawyers Association. He is President of the Adams County Voters League.

=== Politics ===
Johnson ran for the State Senate in 1992 against incumbent Pat Welch, a two-term incumbent from McComb. After an intense campaign, he was elected to the Mississippi Senate for the 38th district in 1993. He served till 2003, after losing election to Kelvin Butler following redistricting.

When Philip West, a member of the Mississippi House of Representatives for the 94th district resigned to run for the mayor of Natchez and won, Johnson was encouraged to run. He ran against four others in the special election on August 3, 2004, coming first with 35.4%. Making it to the run-off on August 17, 2004, he defeated his opponent 53.6% to 46.4% of the vote. He assumed office in 2004.

Johnson was elected Minority Leader for the Mississippi House of Representatives in 2020, winning it without opposition. A few weeks before his election, he had announced his retirement, but cancelled it as it was pending a decision.

Johnson has been noted for his bipartisan spirit in the legislature.

== Personal life ==
He is married to Evelyn Joiner and is of African Methodist Episcopal faith.

Mississippi House of Representatives
Preceded by David Baria	Minority Leader of the Mississippi House of Representatives; 2020–present	Incumbent
