= Gene Alday =

American politician

Member of the Mississippi House of Representatives from the 25th district
- In office January 3, 2012 – January 5, 2016
- Preceded by: John Mayo
- Succeeded by: Dan Eubanks

Personal details
- Born: August 17, 1957 Tunica, Mississippi, U.S.
- Died: October 9, 2016 (aged 59) Southaven, Mississippi, U.S.

W. 'Gene' E. Alday, Jr. (August 17, 1957 – October 9, 2016) was an American Republican politician. He was a member of the Mississippi House of Representatives from the 25th District, being first elected in 2011, leaving office in 2016 after being defeated in the Republican primary by Dan Eubanks.

Alday has also been mayor of Walls, Mississippi.

In February 2015, Alday stated that he opposed increasing funding for education, because in his town, "all the blacks are getting food stamps and what I call 'welfare crazy checks'."

Alday died at the DeSoto South Hospice in Southaven after an extended illness on October 9, 2016.
