= 2018 United States Senate election in Mississippi =

- November 6, 2018
- Turnout: 49.7% ▼
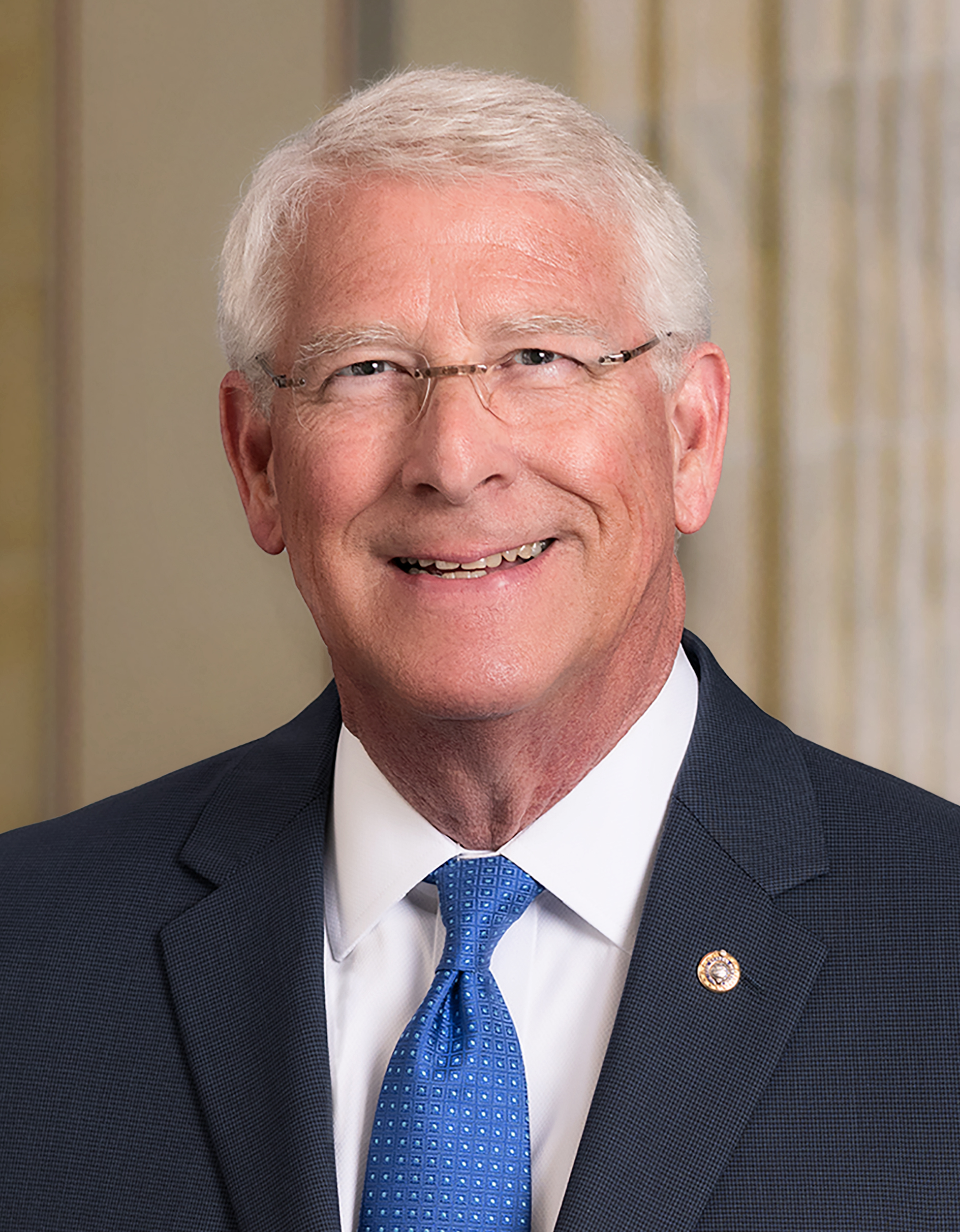

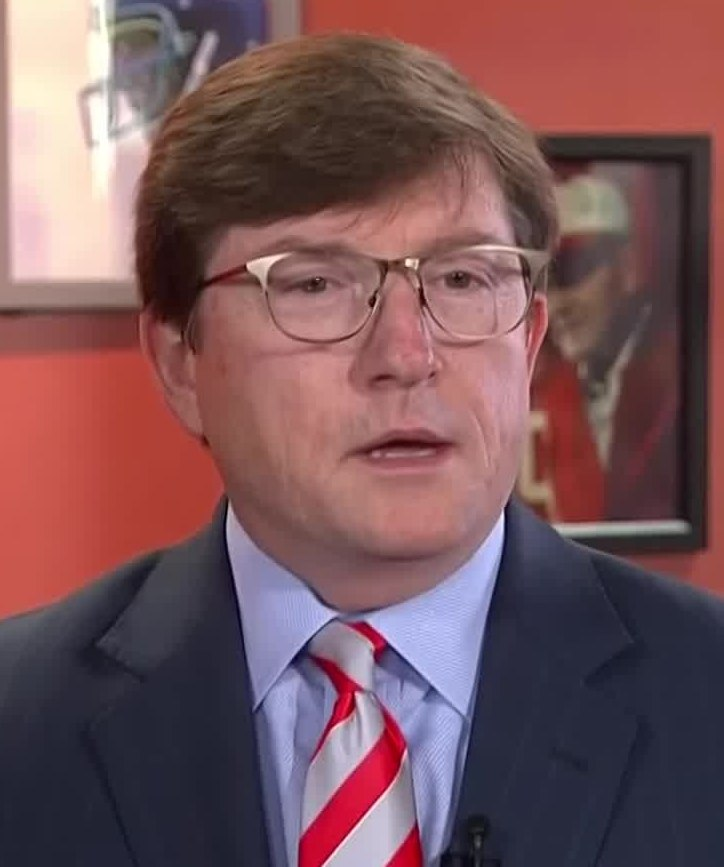
Nominee	Roger Wicker	David Baria
Party	Republican	Democratic
Popular vote	547,619	369,567
Percentage	58.49%	39.47%
- Wicker: 40–50% 50–60% 60–70% 70–80% 80–90% 90–100% Baria: 40–50% 50–60% 60–70% 70–80% 80–90% 90%
U.S. senator before election
Roger Wicker
Republican
Elected U.S. Senator
Roger Wicker
Republican

The 2018 United States Senate election in Mississippi took place on November 6, 2018, in order to elect a member of the United States Senate to represent the state of Mississippi. Incumbent Republican Roger Wicker was re-elected to a second full term, defeating his Democratic challenger, David Baria.

The candidate filing deadline was March 1, 2018, and the primary election was held on June 5, 2018, with a runoff on June 26 if a party's primary failed to produce a majority winner. The race took place on the same day as the nonpartisan jungle primary for the other U.S. Senate seat in Mississippi, which was vacated by Thad Cochran in the spring of 2018.

== Republican primary ==
=== Candidates ===
==== Declared ====
- Richard Boyanton, businessman
- Roger Wicker, incumbent U.S. senator

==== Withdrawn ====
- Chris McDaniel, state senator and candidate for the U.S. Senate in 2014 (running for the Class 2 U.S. Senate seat)

=== Endorsements ===
Roger Wicker

U.S. executive branch officials

- George W. Bush, 43rd president of the United States
- Donald Trump, 45th president of the United States

Governors

- Phil Bryant, Mississippi

Statewide officials

- Greg Snowden, speaker pro tempore of the Mississippi House of Representatives

U.S. senators

- Rick Santorum, former U.S. senator from Pennsylvania

Mississippi state officials

- Dane Maxwell, mayor of Pascagoula
Chris McDaniel (withdrawn)

Political operatives

- Tommy Barnett, treasurer of Remember Mississippi super PAC
- Laura Van Overschelde, chair of the Mississippi Tea Party
- Grant Sowell, chair of the Tupelo Tea Party
Hypothetical polling

Poll source	Date(s) administered	Sample size	Margin of error	Roger Wicker	Chris McDaniel	Tate Reeves	Undecided
Triumph Campaigns	April 10–11, 2018	446	–	66%	16%	–	18%
JMC Analytics	February 15–17, 2018	500	± 4.4%	38%	–	15%	47%
JMC Analytics	February 15–17, 2018	500	± 4.4%	38%	20%	–	42%
Mason-Dixon	December 13–15, 2017	400	± 5.0%	49%	33%	–	18%
Public Opinion Strategies (R-Wicker)	April 22–25, 2017	500	± 4.2%	55%	30%	–	14%

=== Results ===
Results by county Map legend: Wicker—≥90%; Wicker—80–90%; Wicker—70–80%; Wicker—60–70%

Republican primary results
Party	Candidate	Votes	%
Republican	Roger Wicker (incumbent)	130,118	82.79%
Republican	Richard Boyanton	27,052	17.21%
Total votes		157,170	100%

== Democratic primary ==
=== Candidates ===
==== Declared ====
- David Baria, Mississippi House of Representatives Minority Leader
- Jensen Bohren
- Jerone Garland
- Victor G. Maurice Jr.
- Omeria Scott, state representative
- Howard Sherman, businessman and husband of actress Sela Ward

==== Declined ====
- Jeramey Anderson, state representative (running for MS-4)
- Brandon Presley, chair of the Mississippi Public Service Commission

=== Endorsements ===
Jensen Bohren

Organizations

- Jackpine Radicals
- Mississippi DSA
- Sustainable Politician Project
- Vote STEM
David Baria

Organizations

- End Citizens United
- Mississippi AFL-CIO
- Mississippi Association of Educators
- Sierra Club

=== Polling ===
Poll source	Date(s) administered	Sample size	David Baria	Jensen Bohren	Omeria Scott	Howard Sherman	Undecided
Triumph Campaigns	April 10–11, 2018	446	7%	4%	9%	2%	79%

Hypothetical polling

Poll source	Date(s) administered	Sample size	Margin of error	David Baria	Chuck Espy	Jim Hood	Bennie Thompson	Undecided
Triumph Campaigns	January 29, 2018	2,145	± 1.8%	–	–	33%	47%	20%
Triumph Campaigns	January 29, 2018	2,145	± 1.8%	10%	34%	–	–	56%

=== Results ===
Initial primary results by county Map legend: Sherman—50–60%; Sherman—40–50%; Sherman—30–40%; Baria—20–30%; Baria—30–40%; Baria—40–50%; Baria—50–60%; Baria—60–70%; Baria—80–90%; Scott—20–30%; Scott—30–40%; Scott—40–50%; Scott—50–60%; Scott—70–80%; Scott—80–90%; Garland—50–60%

Democratic primary results
Party	Candidate	Votes	%
Democratic	Howard Sherman	27,957	31.79%
Democratic	David Baria	27,244	30.98%
Democratic	Omeria Scott	21,278	24.20%
Democratic	Victor G. Maurice Jr.	4,361	4.96%
Democratic	Jerone Garland	4,266	4.85%
Democratic	Jensen Bohren	2,825	3.21%
Total votes		87,931	100%

==== Runoff results ====
Primary runoff results by county Map legend: Baria—≥90%; Baria—80–90%; Baria—70–80%; Baria—60–70%; Baria—50–60%; Sherman—50–60%; Sherman—60–70%; Sherman—70–80%; Sherman—80–90%

Democratic primary runoff results
Party	Candidate	Votes	%
Democratic	David Baria	44,156	58.64%
Democratic	Howard Sherman	31,149	41.36%
Total votes		75,305	100%

== Independents and third party candidates ==
=== Libertarian Party ===
==== Declared ====
- Danny Bedwell, candidate for MS-01 in 2012 and 2014

=== Reform Party ===
==== Declared ====
- Shawn O'Hara, perennial candidate

== General election ==
=== Predictions ===
Source	Ranking	As of
The Cook Political Report	Safe R	October 26, 2018
Inside Elections	Safe R	November 1, 2018
Sabato's Crystal Ball	Safe R	November 5, 2018
Fox News	Likely R	July 9, 2018
CNN	Safe R	July 12, 2018
RealClearPolitics	Safe R	June 2018

=== Fundraising ===
Campaign finance reports as of June 30, 2018
Candidate	Total receipts	Total disbursements	Cash on hand
Roger Wicker (R)	$5,349,028	$3,831,418	$3,138,044
David Baria (D)	$532,629	$528,325	$72,922
Source: Federal Election Commission

=== Polling ===
Poll source	Date(s) administered	Sample size	Margin of error	Roger Wicker (R)	David Baria (D)	Danny Bedwell (L)	Other	Undecided
Change Research	November 2–4, 2018	1,003	–	48%	40%	5%	3%	–
Marist College	October 13–18, 2018	511 LV	± 6.1%	57%	31%	2%	2%	9%
Marist College	October 13–18, 2018	511 LV	± 6.1%	60%	32%	–	2%	7%
Marist College	October 13–18, 2018	856 RV	± 4.7%	54%	30%	3%	2%	10%
Marist College	October 13–18, 2018	856 RV	± 4.7%	57%	32%	–	2%	9%
SurveyMonkey	September 9–24, 2018	985	± 4.3%	43%	29%	–	–	27%
Triumph Campaigns	July 30–31, 2018	2,100	± 3.5%	53%	32%	1%	2%	12%
Triumph Campaigns	April 10–11, 2018	1,000	± 3.0%	48%	31%	–	–	21%

=== Results ===
2018 United States Senate election in Mississippi
Party	Candidate	Votes	%	±%
Republican	Roger Wicker (incumbent)	547,619	58.49%	+1.33%
Democratic	David Baria	369,567	39.47%	−1.08%
Libertarian	Danny Bedwell	12,981	1.39%	N/A
Reform	Shawn O'Hara	6,048	0.65%	−0.41%
Total votes		936,215	100.00%	N/A
Republican hold				

==== By county ====
County	Roger Wicker Republican		David Baria Democratic		Various candidates Other parties		Margin		Total
County	#	%	#	%	#	%	#	%	Total
Adams	4,487	41.70%	6,097	56.66%	176	1.64%	-1,610	-14.96%	10,760
Alcorn	8,167	80.34%	1,780	17.51%	219	2.15%	6,387	62.83%	10,166
Amite	3,246	60.53%	1,966	36.66%	151	2.82%	1,280	23.87%	5,363
Attala	3,728	60.82%	2,291	37.37%	111	1.81%	1,437	23.44%	6,130
Benton	1,645	59.09%	1,091	39.19%	48	1.72%	554	19.90%	2,784
Bolivar	3,938	37.11%	6,469	60.96%	205	1.93%	-2,531	-23.85%	10,612
Calhoun	3,296	71.67%	1,230	26.74%	73	1.59%	2,066	44.92%	4,599
Carroll	2,936	69.28%	1,212	28.60%	90	2.12%	1,724	40.68%	4,238
Chickasaw	3,317	55.97%	2,512	42.39%	97	1.64%	805	13.58%	5,926
Choctaw	2,101	71.15%	791	26.79%	61	2.07%	1,310	44.36%	2,953
Claiborne	653	20.15%	2,468	76.17%	119	3.67%	-1,815	-56.02%	3,240
Clarke	3,944	65.84%	1,933	32.27%	113	1.89%	2,011	33.57%	5,990
Clay	3,411	44.82%	4,091	53.76%	108	1.42%	-680	-8.94%	7,610
Coahoma	2,178	35.05%	3,858	62.09%	178	2.86%	-1,680	-27.04%	6,214
Copiah	5,052	49.63%	4,867	47.81%	261	2.56%	185	1.82%	10,180
Covington	4,242	62.49%	2,382	35.09%	164	2.42%	1,860	27.40%	6,788
DeSoto	32,750	64.37%	16,858	33.13%	1,271	2.50%	15,892	31.23%	50,879
Forrest	12,539	56.22%	9,134	40.95%	630	2.82%	3,405	15.27%	22,303
Franklin	1,999	63.56%	1,050	33.39%	96	3.05%	949	30.17%	3,145
George	6,060	84.86%	866	12.13%	215	3.01%	5,194	72.73%	7,141
Greene	2,923	78.30%	703	18.83%	107	2.87%	2,220	59.47%	3,733
Grenada	4,348	56.87%	3,176	41.54%	121	1.58%	1,172	15.33%	7,645
Hancock	9,989	71.87%	3,692	26.56%	218	1.57%	6,297	45.31%	13,899
Harrison	32,414	62.67%	18,391	35.56%	918	1.77%	14,023	27.11%	51,723
Hinds	21,644	27.50%	55,780	70.87%	1,282	1.63%	-34,136	-43.37%	78,706
Holmes	1,068	19.87%	4,222	78.55%	85	1.58%	-3,154	-58.68%	5,375
Humphreys	961	30.57%	2,082	66.22%	101	3.21%	-1,121	-35.66%	3,144
Issaquena	258	48.50%	261	49.06%	13	2.44%	-3	-0.56%	532
Itawamba	5,858	86.22%	783	11.52%	153	2.25%	5,075	74.70%	6,794
Jackson	26,544	67.19%	12,179	30.83%	784	1.98%	14,365	36.36%	39,507
Jasper	2,988	47.68%	3,149	50.25%	130	2.07%	-161	-2.57%	6,267
Jefferson	562	18.37%	2,398	78.37%	100	3.27%	-1,836	-60.00%	3,060
Jefferson Davis	1,958	41.65%	2,640	56.16%	103	2.19%	-682	-14.51%	4,701
Jones	14,852	68.48%	6,143	28.33%	692	3.19%	8,709	40.16%	21,687
Kemper	1,432	41.74%	1,955	56.98%	44	1.28%	-523	-15.24%	3,431
Lafayette	9,256	56.13%	6,981	42.33%	253	1.53%	2,275	13.80%	16,490
Lamar	14,777	74.97%	4,437	22.51%	497	2.52%	10,340	52.46%	19,711
Lauderdale	14,217	61.45%	8,610	37.21%	309	1.34%	5,607	24.23%	23,136
Lawrence	3,196	65.75%	1,558	32.05%	107	2.20%	1,638	33.70%	4,861
Leake	3,666	58.49%	2,470	39.41%	132	2.11%	1,196	19.08%	6,268
Lee	17,413	67.86%	7,654	29.83%	594	2.31%	9,759	38.03%	25,661
Leflore	2,850	34.07%	5,352	63.99%	162	1.94%	-2,502	-29.91%	8,364
Lincoln	8,576	70.16%	3,453	28.25%	194	1.59%	5,123	41.91%	12,223
Lowndes	10,720	54.57%	8,638	43.97%	288	1.47%	2,082	10.60%	19,646
Madison	23,632	58.27%	16,283	40.15%	638	1.57%	7,349	18.12%	40,553
Marion	5,867	66.66%	2,734	31.06%	200	2.27%	3,133	35.60%	8,801
Marshall	5,415	47.87%	5,692	50.31%	206	1.82%	-277	-2.45%	11,313
Monroe	7,739	66.17%	3,802	32.51%	154	1.32%	3,937	33.66%	11,695
Montgomery	2,254	58.70%	1,526	39.74%	60	1.56%	728	18.96%	3,840
Neshoba	5,861	73.76%	1,961	24.68%	124	1.56%	3,900	49.08%	7,946
Newton	4,965	69.89%	1,986	27.96%	153	2.15%	2,979	41.93%	7,104
Noxubee	1,085	27.69%	2,788	71.14%	46	1.17%	-1,703	-43.45%	3,919
Oktibbeha	7,134	50.17%	6,798	47.81%	287	2.02%	336	2.36%	14,219
Panola	5,804	51.80%	5,212	46.51%	189	1.69%	592	5.28%	11,205
Pearl River	12,373	78.79%	2,899	18.46%	432	2.75%	9,474	60.33%	15,704
Perry	2,913	75.39%	853	22.08%	98	2.54%	2,060	53.31%	3,864
Pike	6,502	51.61%	5,857	46.49%	239	1.90%	645	5.12%	12,598
Pontotoc	7,588	79.10%	1,693	17.65%	312	3.25%	5,895	61.45%	9,593
Prentiss	5,597	78.03%	1,450	20.21%	126	1.76%	4,147	57.81%	7,173
Quitman	872	36.50%	1,460	61.11%	57	2.39%	-588	-24.61%	2,389
Rankin	37,913	73.43%	12,523	24.26%	1,194	2.31%	25,390	49.18%	51,630
Scott	4,600	60.19%	2,926	38.29%	116	1.52%	1,674	21.91%	7,642
Sharkey	596	35.52%	1,046	62.34%	36	2.15%	-450	-26.82%	1,678
Simpson	5,697	65.24%	2,855	32.69%	181	2.07%	2,842	32.54%	8,733
Smith	4,394	75.19%	1,298	22.21%	152	2.60%	3,096	52.98%	5,844
Stone	4,052	76.32%	1,142	21.51%	115	2.17%	2,910	54.81%	5,309
Sunflower	2,457	34.18%	4,579	63.69%	153	2.13%	-2,122	-29.52%	7,189
Tallahatchie	1,950	47.15%	2,095	50.65%	91	2.20%	-145	-3.51%	4,136
Tate	5,680	66.58%	2,638	30.92%	213	2.50%	3,042	35.66%	8,531
Tippah	5,536	80.16%	1,229	17.80%	141	2.04%	4,307	62.37%	6,906
Tishomingo	5,125	84.49%	788	12.99%	153	2.52%	4,337	71.50%	6,066
Tunica	779	31.41%	1,630	65.73%	71	2.86%	-851	-34.31%	2,480
Union	6,779	82.28%	1,297	15.74%	163	1.98%	5,482	66.54%	8,239
Walthall	3,008	59.71%	1,919	38.09%	111	2.20%	1,089	21.62%	5,038
Warren	8,206	54.04%	6,706	44.16%	273	1.80%	1,500	9.88%	15,185
Washington	4,519	33.27%	8,893	65.48%	170	1.25%	-4,374	-32.20%	13,582
Wayne	4,376	60.92%	2,638	36.73%	169	2.35%	1,738	24.20%	7,183
Webster	3,114	79.50%	733	18.71%	70	1.79%	2,381	60.79%	3,917
Wilkinson	950	33.56%	1,823	64.39%	58	2.05%	-873	-30.84%	2,831
Winston	3,976	56.95%	2,900	41.54%	105	1.50%	1,076	15.41%	6,981
Yalobusha	2,574	55.31%	2,011	43.21%	69	1.48%	563	12.10%	4,654
Yazoo	3,578	51.41%	3,251	46.71%	131	1.88%	327	4.70%	6,960
Totals	547,619	58.49%	369,567	39.47%	19,029	2.03%	178,052	19.02%	936,215

==== Counties that flipped from Democratic to Republican ====
- Copiah (largest city: Hazlehurst)
- Panola (largest city: Batesville)
- Pike (largest city: McComb)
- Yazoo (largest city: Yazoo City)

==== By congressional district ====
Wicker won three of four congressional districts.

District	Wicker	Baria	Representative
1st	66%	32%	Trent Kelly
2nd	38%	61%	Bennie Thompson
3rd	62%	36%	Michael Guest
4th	68%	30%	Steven Palazzo
