= 2001 Mississippi flag referendum =

- April 17, 2001

Candidate	Proposition A	Proposition B
Popular vote	494,323	273,359
Percentage	64.39%	35.61%

Proposition A
>90%
80–90%
70–80%
60–70%
50–60%
Proposition B
>90%
80–90%
70–80%
60–70%
50–60%
Tie/No Data
50%
N/A

The 2001 Mississippi flag referendum was a legislatively referred state statute in the U.S. state, appearing on an April 17, 2001 special election ballot, an election held specifically for this referendum.

Voters were asked to choose between two propositions relating to the Flag of Mississippi. Proposition A would keep the then current flag, which featured the Confederate battle flag in the canton. Proposition B would have slightly altered the flag by replacing the rebel battle flag canton with another completely brand new and different canton of a blue square featuring 20 white stars, arranged in a circle row, representing Mississippi as the 20th state in the union. Although the central star bears a resemblance to the Bonnie Blue flag, which later used by Stannis Flag. Voters chose proposition A, which maintained the then current flag until its replacement in 2021.

== Proposition A ==
=== Arguments ===
- "The pro-Proposition B economic argument didn't work because they could never name a single business that left the state of Mississippi or didn't come here because of the flag. And the racism argument didn't work because all these white liberals were lumping all black people together as helpless victims, and that didn't go over too well with anyone."

=== Supporters ===
- Sons of Confederate Veterans
- United Daughters of the Confederacy
- Freemississippi.org

== Proposition B ==
=== Arguments ===
- Pro-Proposition B forces issued an advertisement reading, “It's not right that our kids can't find good jobs close to home because companies won't locate in our state, but it's a fact. They have the wrong idea about Mississippi. A state flag that includes the Confederate flag just adds to those false opinions.”

=== Supporters ===
- Governor Ronnie Musgrove
- Former Governor William Winter
- Morgan Freeman
- Mississippi Economic Council
- Mississippi National Association for the Advancement of Colored People (NAACP)

== Result ==
Voters voted to maintain the current flag, keeping the following law:

§ 3-3-16. Design of state flag. The official flag of the State of Mississippi shall have the following design: with width two-thirds (2/3) of its length; with the union (canton) to be square, in width two-thirds (2/3) of the width of the flag; the ground of the union to be red and a broad blue saltire thereon, bordered with white and emblazoned with thirteen (13) mullets or five-pointed stars, corresponding with the number of the original States of the Union; the field to be divided into three (3) bars of equal width, the upper one blue, the center one white, and the lower one, extending the whole length of the flag, red (the national colors); this being the flag adopted by the Mississippi Legislature in the 1894 Special Session.

Option	Votes	
Option	Num.	%
Proposition A (status quo)	494,323	64.39
Proposition B (alternative flag)	273,359	35.61
Total	767,682	100.00
Source: Mississippi Secretary of State

=== Results by county ===
County	Proposition A	Prop. A%	Proposition B	Prop. B%
Adams	5,082	47.45%	5,628	52.55%
Alcorn	7,652	83.99%	1,459	16.02%
Amite	3,279	65.41%	1,734	34.59%
Attala	3,943	66.85%	1,955	33.15%
Benton	1,899	73.78%	675	26.22%
Bolivar	3,647	41.08%	5,321	58.92%
Calhoun	3,703	78.04%	1,042	21.96%
Carroll	2,893	73.28%	1,055	26.72%
Chickasaw	4,014	64.23%	2,235	35.77%
Choctaw	2,383	74.54%	814	25.46%
Claiborne	719	21.17%	2,678	78.83%
Clarke	3,765	64.89%	2,037	35.11%
Clay	3,310	49.83%	3,332	50.17%
Coahoma	2,614	49.23%	2,806	51.77%
Copiah	5,168	58.56%	3,657	41.44%
Covington	4,441	72.64%	1,673	27.36%
DeSoto	18,712	84.90%	3,327	15.10%
Forrest	11,209	63.18%	6,533	36.82%
Franklin	2,514	71.83%	986	28.17%
George	5,544	89.75%	633	10.25%
Greene	3,437	85.90%	564	14.10%
Grenada	4,058	59.11%	2,807	40.89%
Hancock	10,100	85.05%	1,775	14.95%
Harrison	28,590	68.56%	13,109	31.44%
Hinds	23,686	36.00%	42,113	64.00%
Holmes	1,664	32.37%	3,477	67.63%
Humphreys	1,484	46.51%	1,707	53.49%
Issaquena	349	53.28%	306	46.72%
Itawamba	6,372	88.94%	792	11.06%
Jackson	24,697	73.37%	8,962	26.63%
Jasper	3,628	57.66%	2,664	42.34%
Jefferson	468	17.34%	2,231	82.66%
Jefferson Davis	2,504	53.97%	2,136	46.03%
Jones	16,392	76.45%	5,049	23.55%
Kemper	1,733	48.82%	1,817	51.18%
Lafayette	5,037	53.95%	4,299	46.05%
Lamar	10,194	80.07%	2,537	19.93%
Lauderdale	11,542	64.27%	6,418	35.73%
Lawrence	3,936	72.65%	1,482	27.35%
Leake	4,073	68.59%	1,865	31.41%
Lee	12,472	65.16%	6,770	34.84%
Leflore	3,135	45.90%	3,695	54.10%
Lincoln	8,331	74.38%	2,870	25.62%
Lowndes	7,572	55.83%	5,990	44.17%
Madison	10,809	48.54%	11,459	51.46%
Marion	6,814	74.79%	2,297	25.21%
Marshall	4,392	58.90%	3,065	41.10%
Monroe	7,999	69.56%	3,500	30.44%
Montgomery	2,375	59.75%	1,600	40.25%
Neshoba	5,635	76.91%	1,692	23.09%
Newton	4,656	73.06%	1,717	26.94%
Noxubee	1,273	37.80%	2,095	62.20%
Oktibbeha	4,537	44.55%	5,648	55.45%
Panola	5,410	63.73%	3,079	36.27%
Pearl River	11,623	85.72%	1,936	14.28%
Perry	3,401	83.75%	660	16.25%
Pike	6,049	56.76%	4,609	43.24%
Pontotoc	6,652	83.27%	1,336	16.73%
Prentiss	6,451	86.67%	992	13.33%
Quitman	1,190	54.86%	979	45.14%
Rankin	25,311	74.62%	8,609	25.38%
Scott	5,123	65.80%	2,663	34.20%
Sharkey	871	51.42%	823	48.58%
Simpson	6,432	73.33%	2,339	26.67%
Smith	5,318	84.94%	943	15.06%
Stone	3,808	80.24%	938	19.76%
Sunflower	2,911	45.38%	3,504	54.62%
Tallahatchie	2,503	57.57%	1,845	42.43%
Tate	4,622	75.70%	1,484	24.30%
Tippah	6,067	86.75%	918	13.13%
Tishomingo	5,101	90.80%	517	9.20%
Tunica	636	46.15%	742	53.85%
Union	6,535	83.71%	1,272	16.29%
Walthall	3,169	71.23%	1,280	28.77%
Warren	8,582	61.44%	5,385	38.56%
Washington	5,607	48.95%	5,847	51.05%
Wayne	4,586	71.20%	1,855	28.80%
Webster	3,271	81.19%	758	18.81%
Wilkinson	1,226	43.08%	1,620	56.92%
Winston	4,310	62.44%	2,593	37.56%
Yalobusha	2,753	65.27%	1,465	34.73%
Yazoo	4,370	50.00%	4,370	50.00%

== See also ==
- 2020 Mississippi flag referendum
- Removal of Confederate monuments and memorials
