= 2020 Mississippi flag referendum =

Mississippi Statewide Measure 3
- November 3, 2020
- Please vote ‘Yes’ or ‘No’ on whether the following design shall be the official Mississippi State Flag
- Proposed flag design
- Voting system: Simple majority

Results
Choice	Votes	%
Yes	943,918	72.98%
No	349,522	27.02%
Valid votes	1,293,440	97.69%
Invalid or blank votes	30,609	2.31%
Total votes	1,324,049	100.00%

For
90–100%
80–90%
70–80%
60–70%
50–60%
Against
70–80%
60–70%
50–60%
Tie

The 2020 Mississippi flag referendum was a legislatively referred state statute appearing on the November 3, 2020 general election ballot in Mississippi. Voters were asked whether the design proposed by the Commission to Redesign the Mississippi State Flag, which does not contain the Confederate battle flag and includes the words "In God We Trust", should be adopted as the new official flag of Mississippi. The referendum passed by a 72.98% to 27.02% margin on November 3, 2020. Voters were not given the option to retain the old, Confederate-based flag.

== Background ==
Official flag (pre-2020)

2001 flag proposal

After an earlier redesign proposal had been voted down in the 2001 Mississippi flag referendum and following the adoption of a new state flag by Georgia in 2003, the Mississippi flag remained the only U.S. state flag to include the Confederate battle flag's saltire. In 2001, a survey conducted by the North American Vexillological Association (NAVA) placed Mississippi's flag 22nd in design quality of the 72 Canadian provincial, U.S. state and U.S. territorial flags ranked.

On June 9, 2020, lawmakers gathered votes and started drafting legislation to change the state flag. The action came after weeks of national protests following the murder of George Floyd, including a protest outside the Mississippi Governor's Mansion on June 6. This was the first substantial action to change the state flag since the 2001 referendum. On June 11, Senate Democrats filed a resolution to change the state flag. On June 24, Lieutenant Governor Delbert Hosemann announced his support for a new flag. Hosemann was joined by Attorney General Lynn Fitch, State Auditor Shad White, Agriculture Commissioner Andy Gipson and Insurance Commissioner Mike Chaney.

On June 28, 2020, the Mississippi Legislature passed a bill, House Bill 1796, that would relinquish the state flag, remove the state flag from public buildings within 15 days of the bill's effective date and constitute a nine-member commission to design a new flag that would be put to voters in a referendum to be held in November 2020. The bill required that the Confederate battle flag not be included on the proposed design and the motto "In God We Trust" be included, as Georgia did when it removed the Confederate emblem from its state flag in 2003. In the House, the bill was passed by 91 in favor and 23 against. In the Senate, the bill was passed with 37 in favor and 14 against.

Reversing his earlier claimed position that the people, and not "a backroom deal by a bunch of politicians", should make the decision to change the flag, Governor Tate Reeves signed the flag bill into law on June 30, 2020. As the legislation repealed the sections of the Mississippi State Code which made provisions for a state flag, namely Section 3-3-16, Mississippi ceased to have an official state flag at this point.

== Proposed design ==
=== Commission to Redesign the Mississippi State Flag ===
Under the terms of House Bill 1796, a body known as the Commission to Redesign the Mississippi State Flag was constituted to suggest a design for a new state flag no later than September 14, 2020. The bill instructed the Mississippi Department of Archives and History to develop a plan for the removal of the 1894 flag from public buildings across the state and provide administrative support for the commission. The act stipulated that any design proposed by the commission must include the words "In God We Trust" and must not contain the Confederate battle flag. The commission consisted of nine members, three of which were appointed by the Speaker of the Mississippi House of Representatives, three members appointed by the Lieutenant Governor of Mississippi, and three by the Governor. Former state Supreme Court Justice Reuben V. Anderson, who serves as president of the Board of Trustees of the Mississippi Department of Archives and History, was unanimously elected as the commission's chairman at its first meeting on July 22.

The five semifinalists selected by the commission on August 18, 2020

The proposed design would be subject to a referendum to be held concurrently with the general election on November 3, 2020. Should the referendum result in a "yes" vote for the proposed design, then the design would be officially adopted as the new state flag of Mississippi during the next regular legislative session. Should the referendum result in a "no" vote for the proposed design, the commission would reconvene and propose different designs. The legislation stated that further referendums could then be held on the Tuesday after the first Monday in November of a year in which the commission makes a new recommendation until a "yes" vote is achieved. Mississippi would remain without an official state flag until a new one is adopted through this process. Voters were not given the option to retain the previous, Confederate-based flag.

=== Call for public submissions ===
The Mississippi Department of Archives and History invited the public to submit designs for a new state flag on July 13. In accordance with the rules imposed by House Bill 1796, designs would only be accepted if they contained the words "In God We Trust" and not include the Confederate battle flag. The commission also added that suggestions would need to be unique and adhere to principles of the North American Vexillological Association: that the design should use only two or three basic colors, be simple enough for a child to draw, and have meaningful symbolism. Entries were to be submitted by email or by post and be received by the commission by August 13, 2020, to be considered. The deadline was moved to August 1 to allow time for the commission to complete the selection process.

=== Selection of finalists ===
"Great River Flag"

"The New Magnolia"

More than 2000 submissions (other estimates put this figure at 2800 images, but a few images were erroneously repeated) meeting the legislative criteria were received and displayed on the Mississippi Department of Archives and History website. Each of the 9 commission members picked 25 flags, narrowing the list down to 147.

At an August 14 meeting, the commission announced that they had selected nine proposals. These proposals, depicting various elements including a representation of the Mississippi River, magnolias, and stars composed of diamonds significant to the Choctaw nation, had either red, white, and blue or green and white color schemes. The commission announced that they would narrow these designs down to five finalists at its next meeting on August 18. Five semifinalists were published on August 18, and this was reduced to two finalists on August 25.

The final two flags were the "Great River Flag" designed by Micah Whitson and "The New Magnolia" designed by Rocky Vaughan, Sue Anna Joe, Kara Giles and Dominique Pugh.

On September 2, the commission voted 8–1 to put the New Magnolia flag on the November ballot. Slight modifications were made to the original design, including making the text bolder and the red and gold bars thicker. The flag is officially referred to as the "In God We Trust Flag". Rocky Vaughan is credited with designing the flag's overall layout, with design support provided by Sue Anna Joe, Kara Giles and Dominique Pugh (who created the magnolia illustration featured in the center). Micah Whitson was also given credit for the appearance of the Native American star.

The referendum passed by a 73% to 27% margin on November 3, 2020. It was then approved by the Mississippi State House of Representatives on January 5, 2021, and passed by the State Senate on January 6, 2021. It was then signed into law by Governor Reeves on January 11, 2021, making the "In God We Trust Flag" the official state flag.

== Controversy ==
The Satanic Temple has threatened to sue the State of Mississippi if the phrase "In God We Trust" is included on the flag. Americans United for Separation of Church and State declared the state's actions as trading "a white nationalist symbol for a Christian nationalist one". Both the American Humanist Association and Americans United for Separation of Church and State have published their own editorials in disagreement with the use of the phrase on a new flag.

"Let Mississippi Vote" is a group that is campaigning for another referendum on a choice of four flag designs including the Magnolia flag that was adopted in the November 2020 referendum and the version that it replaced. Their aim is to give Mississippians a choice instead of voting on only one flag. The group reached their goal of 5000 volunteers and have sent wording for their referendum to the Mississippi Attorney General's Office for approval. They would have needed the valid signatures of 106,190 Mississippi residents for the initiative to be placed on a ballot as early as 2021.

== Opinion polling ==
Polling firm	Date	For	Against	Undecided	Margin of error	Sample
Civiqs	October 23–26, 2020	61%	31%	8%	± 5.3%	507

== Result ==
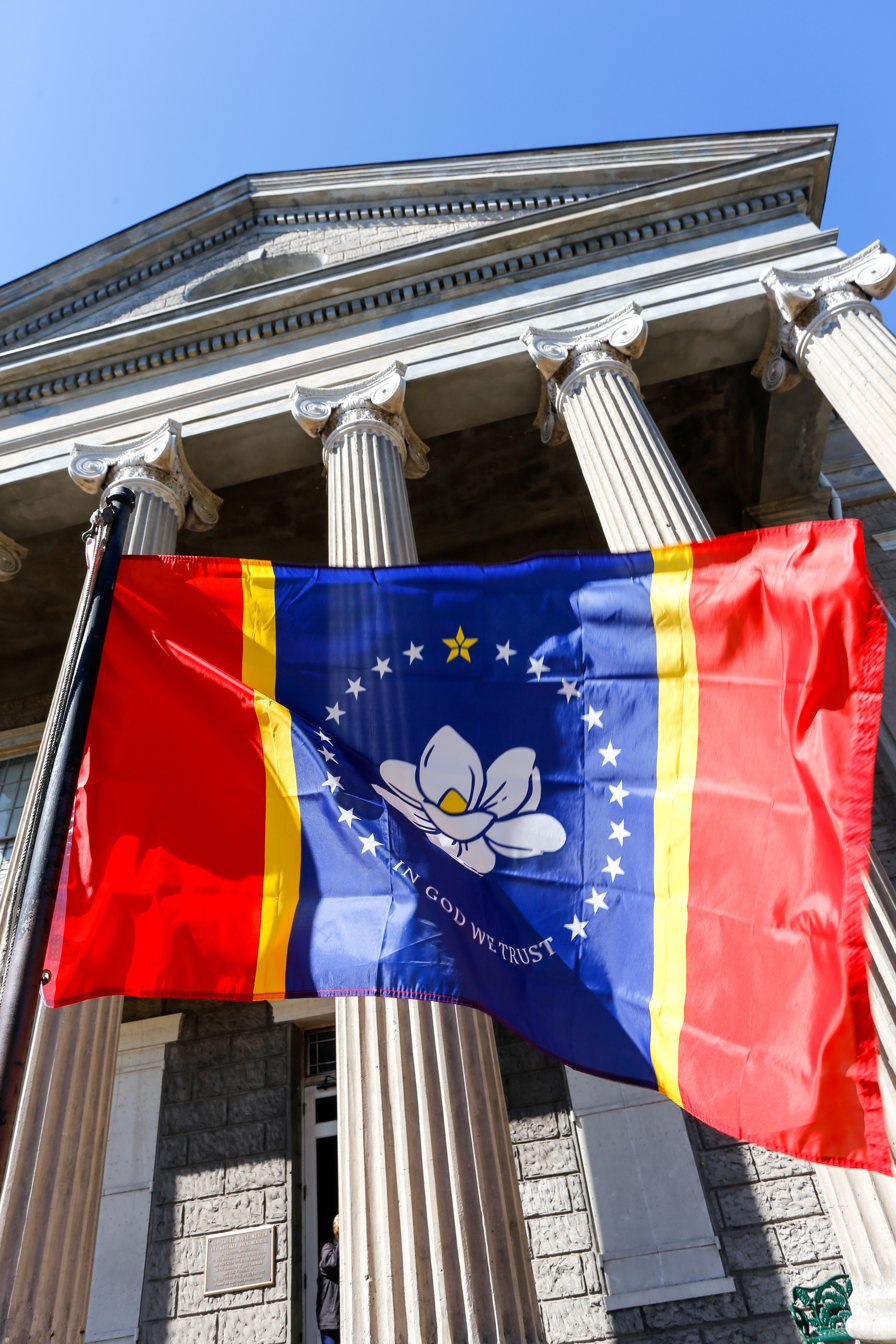
The new flag flies in front of the Old Vicksburg Courthouse in 2022

Option	Votes	
Option	Num.	%
Yes (adopt new flag)	943,918	71.29
No (do not adopt new flag)	349,522	26.40
Blank/invalid votes	30,609	2.31
Total	1,324,049	100.00
Source: Mississippi Secretary of State

=== By county ===
County	Yes		No	
County	Votes	%	Votes	%
Adams	10,450	78.3%	2,898	21.7%
Alcorn	8,806	56.8%	6,694	43.2%
Amite	4,171	59.1%	2,889	40.9%
Attala	6,054	69.5%	2,663	30.5%
Benton	2,555	61.5%	1,598	38.5%
Bolivar	11,047	83.3%	2,217	16.7%
Calhoun	4,270	65.6%	2,240	34.4%
Carroll	3,717	66.1%	1,905	33.9%
Chickasaw	5,958	74.2%	2,070	25.8%
Choctaw	2,948	71.1%	1,196	28.9%
Claiborne	3,861	87.3%	564	12.7%
Clarke	5,176	62.8%	3,072	37.2%
Clay	8,035	79.6%	2,053	20.4%
Coahoma	6,867	83.2%	1,385	16.8%
Copiah	9,435	74.2%	3,279	25.8%
Covington	5,901	63.7%	3,364	36.3%
DeSoto	56,232	75.2%	18,519	24.8%
Forrest	22,942	73.2%	8,416	26.8%
Franklin	2,779	63.3%	1,613	36.7%
George	5,281	48.6%	5,583	51.4%
Greene	2,637	46.4%	3,052	53.6%
Grenada	8,053	75.0%	2,687	25.0%
Hancock	13,015	63.0%	7,655	37.0%
Harrison	55,018	74.4%	18,974	25.6%
Hinds	88,643	89.0%	10,907	11.0%
Holmes	6,822	86.9%	1,030	13.1%
Humphreys	3,365	82.8%	701	17.2%
Issaquena	463	71.5%	185	28.5%
Itawamba	6,190	58.0%	4,477	42.0%
Jackson	36,716	68.3%	17,050	31.7%
Jasper	5,847	67.8%	2,778	32.2%
Jefferson	3,332	86.9%	504	13.1%
Jefferson Davis	4,639	76.0%	1,462	24.0%
Jones	17,777	59.8%	11,931	40.2%
Kemper	3,551	76.5%	1,092	23.5%
Lafayette	18,559	80.4%	4,520	19.6%
Lamar	19,140	67.7%	9,132	32.3%
Lauderdale	22,921	74.6%	7,797	25.4%
Lawrence	4,033	61.8%	2,492	38.2%
Leake	6,208	68.4%	2,869	31.6%
Lee	27,263	75.8%	8,720	24.2%
Leflore	9,139	86.0%	1,482	14.0%
Lincoln	10,805	64.9%	5,849	35.1%
Lowndes	21,871	81.2%	5,069	18.8%
Madison	47,116	84.4%	8,683	15.6%
Marion	7,428	61.6%	4,632	38.4%
Marshall	11,061	72.7%	4,158	27.3%
Monroe	11,661	68.3%	5,410	31.7%
Montgomery	3,617	72.3%	1,383	27.7%
Neshoba	7,839	67.8%	3,729	32.2%
Newton	6,554	65.3%	3,481	34.7%
Noxubee	4,378	85.9%	718	14.1%
Oktibbeha	16,592	84.7%	2,990	15.3%
Panola	11,420	74.8%	3,849	25.2%
Pearl River	13,684	58.4%	9,763	41.6%
Perry	2,977	51.1%	2,849	48.9%
Pike	12,952	75.5%	4,193	24.5%
Pontotoc	8,712	61.6%	5,438	38.4%
Prentiss	6,479	61.5%	4,051	38.5%
Quitman	2,477	80.3%	606	19.7%
Rankin	51,249	73.1%	18,866	26.9%
Scott	7,464	70.4%	3,134	29.6%
Sharkey	1,728	82.1%	378	17.9%
Simpson	7,566	64.7%	4,130	35.3%
Smith	4,594	55.6%	3,644	44.4%
Stone	4,772	61.6%	2,973	38.4%
Sunflower	7,753	82.2%	1,679	17.8%
Tallahatchie	4,075	73.1%	1,501	26.9%
Tate	8,627	67.5%	4,150	32.5%
Tippah	5,788	58.6%	4,093	41.4%
Tishomingo	4,782	53.4%	4,177	46.6%
Tunica	2,862	82.9%	592	17.1%
Union	7,804	62.2%	4,738	37.8%
Walthall	4,740	68.2%	2,206	31.8%
Warren	16,022	77.3%	4,692	22.7%
Washington	14,753	83.5%	2,914	16.5%
Wayne	6,077	61.1%	3,866	38.9%
Webster	3,449	64.7%	1,883	35.3%
Wilkinson	2,875	73.3%	1,046	26.7%
Winston	7,043	76.9%	2,111	23.1%
Yalobusha	4,664	72.5%	1,771	27.5%
Yazoo	7,792	76.4%	2,412	23.6%

Source: Mississippi Secretary of State

== Voter demographics ==
2020 Mississippi flag referendum voter demographics (AP VoteCast)
Demographic subgroup	Yes	No	% of total vote
Total vote	73	27	100
Ideology
Very liberal	95	5	9
Somewhat liberal	94	6	15
Moderate	73	27	34
Somewhat conservative	83	17	19
Very conservative	63	37	23
Party
Democrats	91	9	35
Republicans	57	43	45
Independents	76	24	20
Gender
Men	75	25	45
Women	71	29	55
Other	87	13	1
Race/ethnicity
White	64	36	62
Black	89	11	35
Latino	79	21	1
Asian	87	13	0
Other	54	46	1
Religion
Protestant	71	29	29
Catholic	87	13	7
Mormon	59	41	1
Other Christian	65	35	32
Jewish	98	2	1
Muslim	96	4	1
Something else	83	17	14
None	74	26	14
Age
18–24 years old	77	23	10
25–29 years old	73	27	9
30–39 years old	77	23	19
40–49 years old	74	26	14
50–64 years old	69	31	25
65 and older	72	28	22
First time voter
Yes	68	32	5
No	73	27	95
Education
High school or less	66	34	40
Some college education or associate degree	73	27	35
Bachelor's degree	83	17	16
Postgraduate degree	86	14	10
Income
Under $25,000	72	28	30
$25,000–$49,999	70	30	29
$50,000–$74,999	75	25	15
$75,000–$99,999	75	25	11
$100,000 or more	78	22	14
Military service
Veteran household	69	31	34
Non-veteran household	79	21	66
Issue regarded as most important
The economy and jobs	66	34	26
Health care	77	23	11
Immigration	36	64	3
Abortion	58	42	4
Law enforcement	68	32	6
Climate change	92	8	2
Foreign policy	68	32	2
The coronavirus pandemic	78	22	34
Racism	84	16	11
Area type
Urban	82	18	10
Suburban	79	21	24
Small town	75	25	32
Rural	64	36	34

== See also ==
- 2001 Mississippi flag referendum
- Modern display of the Confederate battle flag
- Removal of Confederate monuments and memorials
