= 2012 United States Senate election in Mississippi =

- November 6, 2012
- Turnout: 59.7% (voting eligible)
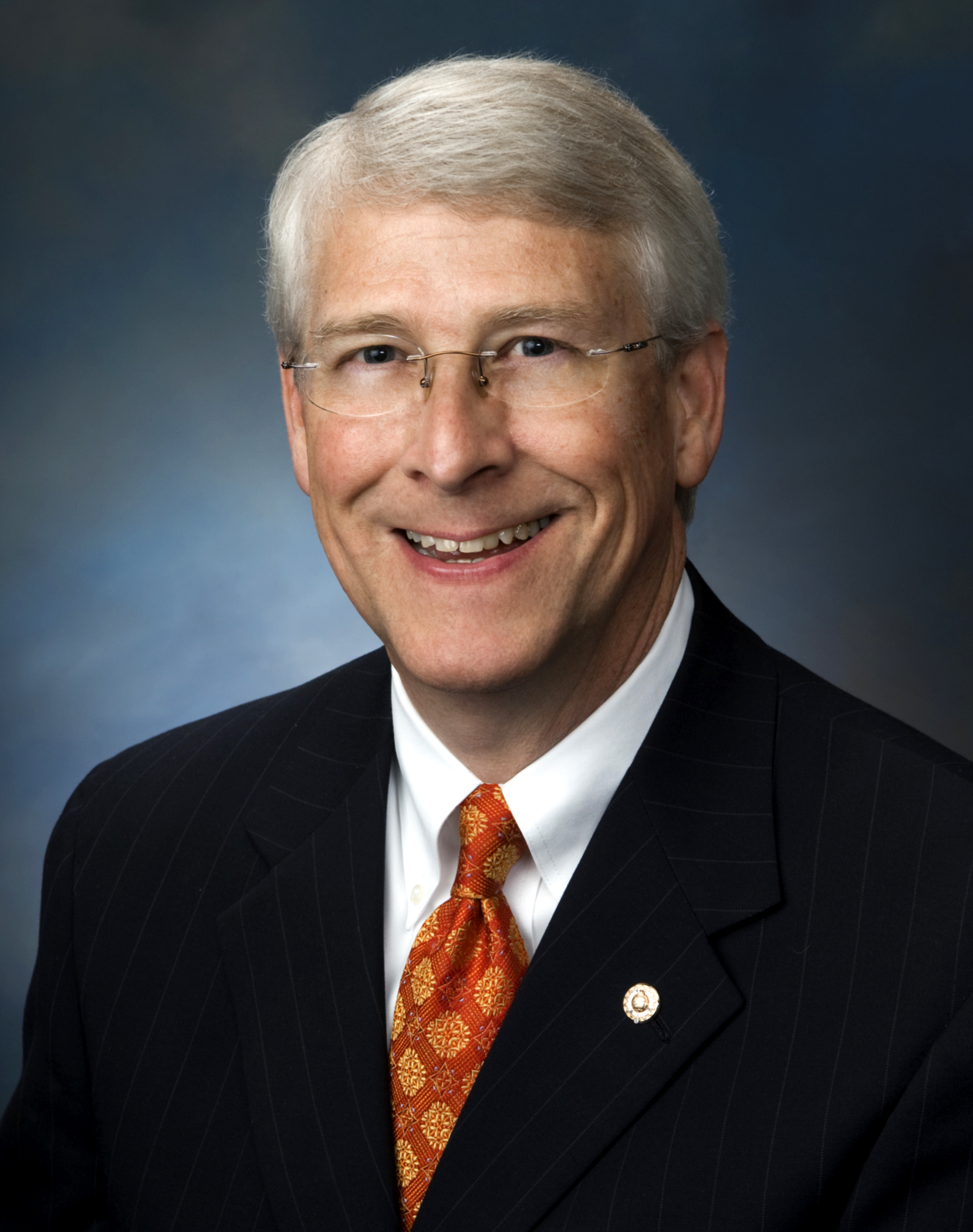

Nominee	Roger Wicker	Albert N. Gore
Party	Republican	Democratic
Popular vote	709,626	503,467
Percentage	57.16%	40.55%
- County results Wicker: 50–60% 60–70% 70–80% 80–90% Gore: 40–50% 50–60% 60–70% 70–80% 80–90%
U.S. senator before election
Roger Wicker
Republican
Elected U.S. Senator
Roger Wicker
Republican

The 2012 United States Senate election in Mississippi was held on November 6, 2012, alongside the 2012 U.S. presidential election, other elections to the United States Senate in other states, elections to the United States House of Representatives, and various state and local elections. Incumbent Republican U.S. Senator Roger Wicker won re-election to his first full term, while 82-year-old Albert N. Gore (possibly distantly related to former U.S. Vice President Al Gore) was the Democratic nominee.

== Background ==
Former U.S. representative Roger Wicker was appointed by Governor Haley Barbour after then-incumbent Trent Lott retired at the end of 2007. A 2008 special election was later scheduled to determine who would serve the remainder of the term. Then-U.S. Sen. Roger Wicker defeated former Mississippi Governor Ronnie Musgrove with 54.96% of the vote in the special election, and would be up for re-election in 2012.

== Republican primary ==
=== Candidates ===
- E. Allen Hathcock, Tea Party activist and Army veteran
- Robert Maloney
- Roger Wicker, incumbent U.S. senator

=== Results ===
Republican primary results
Party	Candidate	Votes	%
Republican	Roger Wicker (incumbent)	254,936	89.17
Republican	Robert Maloney	18,857	6.6
Republican	Allen Hathcock	12,106	4.23
Total votes		285,899	100

== Democratic primary ==
=== Candidates ===
- Albert N. Gore Jr. chairman of the Oktibbeha County Democratic Party
- Will Oatis, Afghan War veteran and Independent candidate for governor in 2011
- Roger Weiner, member of the Coahoma County Board of Supervisors

=== Results ===
Results by county Map legend: Gore—70–80%; Gore—60–70%; Gore—50–60%; Gore—40–50%; Weiner—70–80%; Weiner—40–50%; Oatis—70–80%; Oatis—50–60%; Oatis—40–50%; Tie—40–50%

Democratic primary results
Party	Candidate	Votes	%
Democratic	Albert Gore	49,157	56.77
Democratic	Roger Weiner	21,131	24.4
Democratic	Will Oatis	16,300	18.83
Total votes		86,588	100

== General election ==
=== Candidates ===
- Thomas Cramer (Constitution), employee of Ingalls Shipbuilding
- Albert Gore (D), chairman of the Oktibbeha County Democratic Party
- Shawn O'Hara (Reform), former chairman of the Reform Party of the United States of America and perennial candidate
- Roger Wicker (R), incumbent U.S. Senator

=== Predictions ===
Source	Ranking	As of
The Cook Political Report	Solid R	November 1, 2012
Sabato's Crystal Ball	Safe R	November 5, 2012
Rothenberg Political Report	Safe R	November 2, 2012
Real Clear Politics	Safe R	November 5, 2012

Hypothetical polling

Poll source	Date(s) administered	Sample size	Margin of error	Roger Wicker (R)	Travis Childers (D)	Other	Undecided
Public Policy Polling	March 24–27, 2011	817	±3.4%	51%	33%	—	15%
Public Policy Polling	November 4–6, 2011	796	±3.5%	56%	30%	—	13%

Poll source	Date(s) administered	Sample size	Margin of error	Roger Wicker (R)	Jim Hood (D)	Other	Undecided
Public Policy Polling	March 24–27, 2011	817	±3.4%	50%	36%	—	14%
Public Policy Polling	November 4–6, 2011	796	±3.5%	52%	39%	—	9%

Poll source	Date(s) administered	Sample size	Margin of error	Roger Wicker (R)	Mike Moore (D)	Other	Undecided
Public Policy Polling	March 24–27, 2011	817	±3.4%	48%	38%	—	14%
Public Policy Polling	November 4–6, 2011	796	±3.5%	53%	39%	—	8%

Poll source	Date(s) administered	Sample size	Margin of error	Roger Wicker (R)	Ronnie Musgrove (D)	Other	Undecided
Public Policy Polling	March 24–27, 2011	817	±3.4%	52%	35%	—	13%
Public Policy Polling	November 4–6, 2011	796	±3.5%	58%	33%	—	9%

Poll source	Date(s) administered	Sample size	Margin of error	Roger Wicker (R)	Gene Taylor (D)	Other	Undecided
Public Policy Polling	March 24–27, 2011	817	±3.4%	48%	36%	—	17%
Public Policy Polling	November 4–6, 2011	796	±3.5%	55%	34%	—	11%

=== Results ===
2012 United States Senate election in Mississippi
Party	Candidate	Votes	%	±%
Republican	Roger Wicker (incumbent)	709,626	57.16%	+2.20%
Democratic	Albert Gore	503,467	40.55%	−4.49%
Constitution	Thomas Cramer	15,281	1.23%	N/A
Reform	Shawn O'Hara	13,194	1.06%	N/A
Total votes		1,241,568	100.00%	N/A
Republican hold				

==== By county ====
County	Roger Wicker Republican		Albert Gore Democratic		Various candidates Other parties		Margin		Total
County	#	%	#	%	#	%	#	%	Total
Adams	6,052	41.69%	8,207	56.53%	258	1.78%	-2,155	-14.84%	14,517
Alcorn	10,417	72.13%	3,722	25.77%	303	2.10%	6,695	46.36%	14,442
Amite	4,315	57.83%	2,959	39.66%	187	2.51%	1,356	18.17%	7,461
Attala	5,037	57.98%	3,492	40.20%	158	1.82%	1,545	17.79%	8,687
Benton	2,010	50.64%	1,866	47.01%	93	2.34%	144	3.63%	3,969
Bolivar	4,939	36.08%	8,277	60.47%	472	3.45%	-3,338	-24.39%	13,688
Calhoun	4,626	66.50%	2,216	31.86%	114	1.64%	2,410	34.65%	6,956
Carroll	3,881	67.75%	1,738	30.34%	109	1.90%	2,143	37.41%	5,728
Chickasaw	4,223	50.86%	3,935	47.39%	146	1.76%	288	3.47%	8,304
Choctaw	2,835	68.28%	1,237	29.79%	80	1.93%	1,598	38.49%	4,152
Claiborne	843	16.48%	4,129	80.72%	143	2.80%	-3,286	-64.24%	5,115
Clarke	4,996	62.39%	2,727	34.05%	285	3.56%	2,269	28.33%	8,008
Clay	4,579	42.34%	6,067	56.10%	168	1.55%	-1,488	-13.76%	10,814
Coahoma	2,769	28.35%	6,807	69.70%	190	1.95%	-4,038	-41.35%	9,766
Copiah	6,446	48.06%	6,672	49.75%	294	2.19%	-226	-1.69%	13,412
Covington	5,440	59.85%	3,382	37.21%	268	2.95%	2,058	22.64%	9,090
DeSoto	41,912	65.05%	21,255	32.99%	1,263	1.96%	20,657	32.06%	64,430
Forrest	16,659	56.41%	12,053	40.81%	820	2.78%	4,606	15.60%	29,532
Franklin	2,686	61.58%	1,579	36.20%	97	2.22%	1,107	25.38%	4,362
George	7,434	77.92%	1,751	18.35%	355	3.72%	5,683	59.57%	9,540
Greene	3,884	68.74%	1,462	25.88%	304	5.38%	2,422	42.87%	5,650
Grenada	5,857	53.53%	4,963	45.36%	122	1.11%	894	8.17%	10,942
Hancock	11,980	71.70%	4,037	24.16%	692	4.14%	7,943	47.54%	16,709
Harrison	40,061	64.31%	20,452	32.83%	1,784	2.86%	19,609	31.48%	62,297
Hinds	31,183	31.15%	67,329	67.25%	1,601	1.60%	-36,146	-36.11%	100,113
Holmes	1,731	20.66%	6,389	76.26%	258	3.08%	-4,658	-55.60%	8,378
Humphreys	1,460	30.60%	3,169	66.41%	143	3.00%	-1,709	-35.81%	4,772
Issaquena	306	43.16%	382	53.88%	21	2.96%	-76	-10.72%	709
Itawamba	7,379	80.08%	1,593	17.29%	243	2.64%	5,786	62.79%	9,215
Jackson	34,863	66.51%	16,043	30.61%	1,511	2.88%	18,820	35.90%	52,417
Jasper	4,232	46.52%	4,596	50.52%	269	2.96%	-364	-4.00%	9,097
Jefferson	673	16.37%	3,302	80.34%	135	3.28%	-2,629	-63.97%	4,110
Jefferson Davis	2,631	39.73%	3,712	56.06%	279	4.21%	-1,081	-16.32%	6,622
Jones	20,083	68.05%	8,633	29.25%	795	2.69%	11,450	38.80%	29,511
Kemper	1,989	40.69%	2,708	55.40%	191	3.91%	-719	-14.71%	4,888
Lafayette	11,302	59.13%	7,481	39.14%	330	1.73%	3,821	19.99%	19,113
Lamar	18,679	76.39%	5,085	20.79%	689	2.82%	13,594	55.59%	24,453
Lauderdale	19,119	60.40%	12,011	37.94%	525	1.66%	7,108	22.45%	31,655
Lawrence	4,089	62.20%	2,336	35.53%	149	2.27%	1,753	26.67%	6,574
Leake	4,861	56.75%	3,531	41.22%	174	2.03%	1,330	15.53%	8,566
Lee	23,043	66.20%	11,227	32.26%	536	1.54%	11,816	33.95%	34,806
Leflore	3,892	33.62%	7,462	64.46%	223	1.93%	-3,570	-30.84%	11,577
Lincoln	10,697	65.95%	5,185	31.96%	339	2.09%	5,512	33.98%	16,221
Lowndes	14,063	52.81%	12,171	45.71%	393	1.48%	1,892	7.11%	26,627
Madison	29,188	60.94%	17,937	37.45%	773	1.61%	11,251	23.49%	47,898
Marion	7,919	63.55%	4,247	34.08%	296	2.38%	3,672	29.47%	12,462
Marshall	6,409	40.99%	8,894	56.88%	334	2.14%	-2,485	-15.89%	15,637
Monroe	10,020	60.35%	6,325	38.09%	259	1.56%	3,695	22.25%	16,604
Montgomery	2,938	55.05%	2,289	42.89%	110	2.06%	649	12.16%	5,337
Neshoba	7,728	71.25%	2,916	26.89%	202	1.86%	4,812	44.37%	10,846
Newton	6,367	66.52%	3,056	31.93%	149	1.56%	3,311	34.59%	9,572
Noxubee	1,648	29.03%	3,946	69.52%	82	1.44%	-2,298	-40.49%	5,676
Oktibbeha	9,184	51.97%	8,163	46.19%	324	1.83%	1,021	5.78%	17,671
Panola	7,471	46.39%	8,243	51.19%	390	2.42%	-772	-4.79%	16,104
Pearl River	15,732	73.38%	4,702	21.93%	1,006	4.69%	11,030	51.45%	21,440
Perry	3,935	70.77%	1,403	25.23%	222	3.99%	2,532	45.54%	5,560
Pike	8,464	48.43%	8,653	49.52%	358	2.05%	-189	-1.08%	17,475
Pontotoc	9,637	78.58%	2,391	19.50%	236	1.92%	7,246	59.08%	12,264
Prentiss	7,024	71.11%	2,665	26.98%	188	1.90%	4,359	44.13%	9,877
Quitman	1,109	30.79%	2,368	65.74%	125	3.47%	-1,259	-34.95%	3,602
Rankin	48,641	76.73%	13,542	21.36%	1,211	1.91%	35,099	55.37%	63,394
Scott	6,211	56.85%	4,474	40.95%	241	2.21%	1,737	15.90%	10,926
Sharkey	830	37.10%	1,356	60.62%	51	2.28%	-526	-23.51%	2,237
Simpson	7,492	62.32%	4,289	35.68%	240	2.00%	3,203	26.65%	12,021
Smith	5,930	73.99%	1,881	23.47%	204	2.55%	4,049	50.52%	8,015
Stone	5,308	71.93%	1,826	24.75%	245	3.32%	3,482	47.19%	7,379
Sunflower	3,228	30.74%	6,945	66.13%	329	3.13%	-3,717	-35.39%	10,502
Tallahatchie	2,629	43.93%	3,202	53.50%	154	2.57%	-573	-9.57%	5,985
Tate	7,069	58.54%	4,723	39.11%	283	2.34%	2,346	19.43%	12,075
Tippah	6,418	71.54%	2,367	26.39%	186	2.07%	4,051	45.16%	8,971
Tishomingo	5,899	75.73%	1,733	22.25%	158	2.03%	4,166	53.48%	7,790
Tunica	923	22.88%	2,947	73.05%	164	4.07%	-2,024	-50.17%	4,034
Union	8,669	77.15%	2,394	21.30%	174	1.55%	6,275	55.84%	11,237
Walthall	3,948	55.56%	2,852	40.14%	306	4.31%	1,096	15.42%	7,106
Warren	10,610	51.85%	9,409	45.98%	443	2.16%	1,201	5.87%	20,462
Washington	6,117	33.90%	11,578	64.17%	349	1.93%	-5,461	-30.26%	18,044
Wayne	5,802	57.39%	3,961	39.18%	346	3.42%	1,841	18.21%	10,109
Webster	3,937	76.54%	1,133	22.03%	74	1.44%	2,804	54.51%	5,144
Wilkinson	1,363	30.70%	2,908	65.50%	169	3.81%	-1,545	-34.80%	4,440
Winston	5,244	53.80%	4,351	44.64%	152	1.56%	893	9.16%	9,747
Yalobusha	3,392	54.06%	2,751	43.85%	131	2.09%	641	10.22%	6,274
Yazoo	5,037	47.27%	5,317	49.90%	302	2.83%	-280	-2.63%	10,656
Totals	709,626	57.16%	503,467	40.55%	28,475	2.29%	206,159	16.60%	1,241,568

==== Counties that flipped from Democratic to Republican ====
- Chickasaw (largest city: Houston)

== See also ==
- 2012 United States Senate elections
- 2012 United States House of Representatives elections in Mississippi
