= Mo Cowan =

American politician (born 1969)

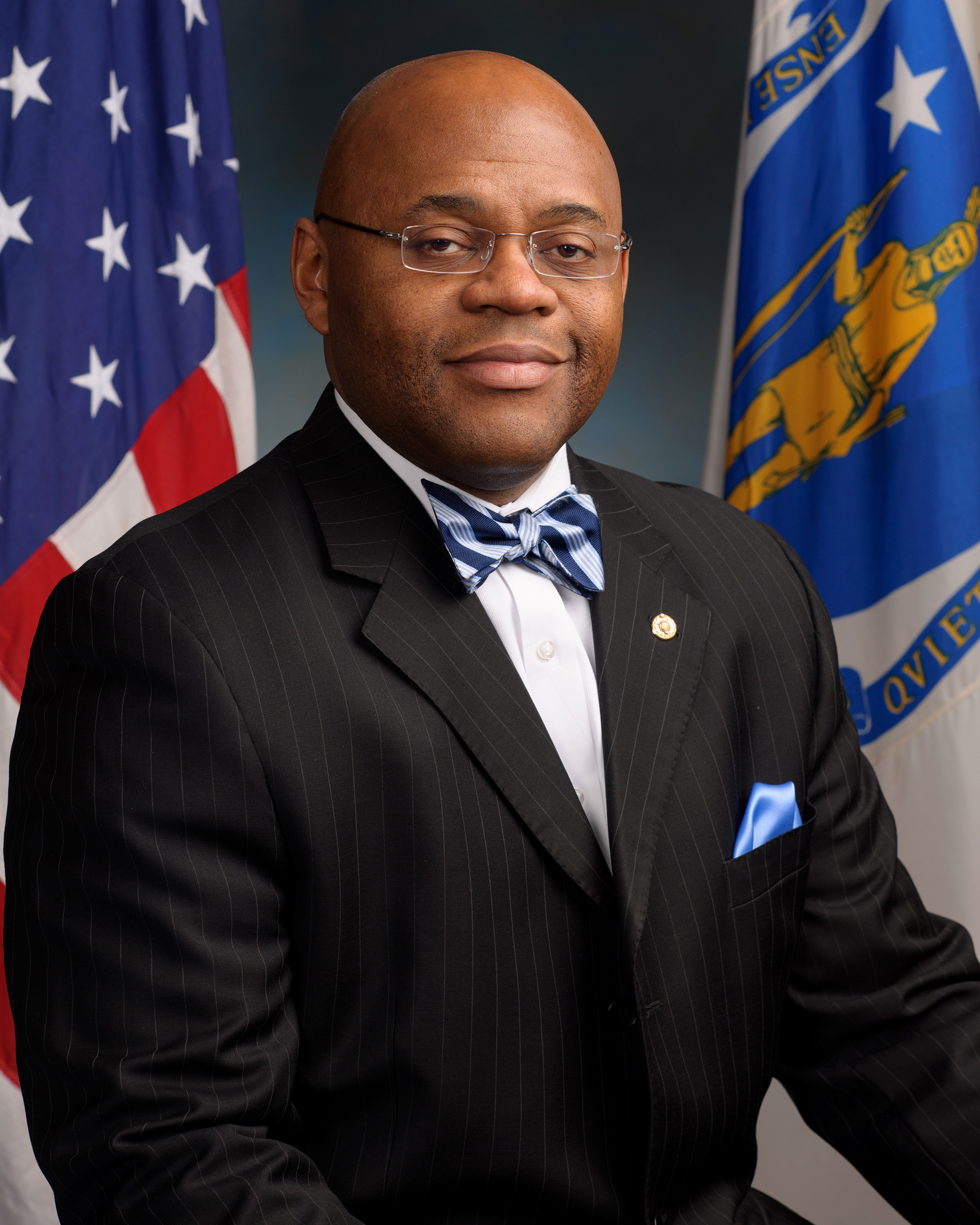
- Official portrait, 2013

United States Senator from Massachusetts
- In office February 1, 2013 – July 15, 2013
- Appointed by: Deval Patrick
- Preceded by: John Kerry
- Succeeded by: Ed Markey

Personal details
- Born: William Maurice Cowan; April 4, 1969 (age 57) Yadkinville, North Carolina, U.S.
- Party: Democratic
- Spouse: Stacy Cowan
- Children: 2
- Education: Duke University (BA); Northeastern University (JD)
- Website: Senate website (archived)
- Cowan's voice Cowan honoring Sean Collier and Richard Donohue, police officer casualties of the Boston bombing. Recorded April 25, 2013

William Maurice "Mo" Cowan (born April 4, 1969) is an American politician who served as a United States senator from Massachusetts from February to July 2013. A member of the Democratic Party, he previously served as legal counsel and chief of staff to Governor Deval Patrick. Patrick appointed him on an interim basis to fill the vacancy left by fellow Democrat John Kerry, who resigned to become U.S. Secretary of State.

Cowan declined to run in the 2013 special election to complete the remainder of Kerry's term. He was succeeded by fellow Democrat Ed Markey. Cowan was the eighth African-American U.S. Senator and the second from Massachusetts after Edward Brooke. He was one of three African-American U.S. senators in the 113th Congress, along with Republican Senator Tim Scott from South Carolina and Democrat Cory Booker from New Jersey, although he did not serve alongside Booker, who took office on October 31, 2013.

== Early life and education ==
Cowan was born on April 4, 1969, in rural Yadkinville, North Carolina, the son of a machinist and a seamstress. His father died when he was 16 years old.

Cowan graduated from Forbush High School. Originally planning to become a doctor, he graduated from Duke University in 1991 with a degree in sociology. Cowan went on to earn his Juris Doctor from Northeastern University School of Law in 1994. His assignments in Northeastern's cooperative program, which provides students with work experience as part of its educational program, included stints in the office of a state trial court, at North Carolina Prison Legal Services, and with the Palm Beach County Public Defender's Office.

== Professional career ==
In 1997, Cowan joined the law firm of Mintz Levin as an associate. There he practiced civil litigation and became a partner. He helped Massachusetts Governor Mitt Romney identify African-American candidates for judgeships after Romney was criticized for lack of diversity among his appointees.

Cowan left Mintz Levin to join Deval Patrick's administration in 2009. As Patrick's counsel, Cowan was responsible for the legal operations of the executive branch and oversaw the governor's judicial nominations, including that of Chief Justice of the Supreme Judicial Court Roderick L. Ireland. His principal projects as staff included legislation to contain the growth of health care costs and to expand gaming, as well as investigating and reorganizing the state Parole Board.

Cowan served as Patrick's chief legal counsel for two years and then as chief of staff from January 2011 until November 2012, when he announced plans to return to the private sector. He continued to serve the governor as a senior adviser until his Senate appointment. When appointed to the Senate, he said he had no intention of seeking public office once his interim appointment expired. He said: "This is going to be a very short political career. I am not running for office. I'm not a candidate for public service at any time today or in the future."

In 2003, Boston Business Journal named him to its list of "40 under 40", a select group of younger business and civic leaders. He is the former president of the Massachusetts Black Lawyers Association and the Northeastern Law School Alumni Association. He serves on the Board of Trustees of Northeastern University. Other non-profit boards he has served on include the Discovering Justice Foundation, Roxbury Preparatory Charter School, the Chestnut Hill School, and Project STEP.

== U.S. Senate ==
=== Tenure ===
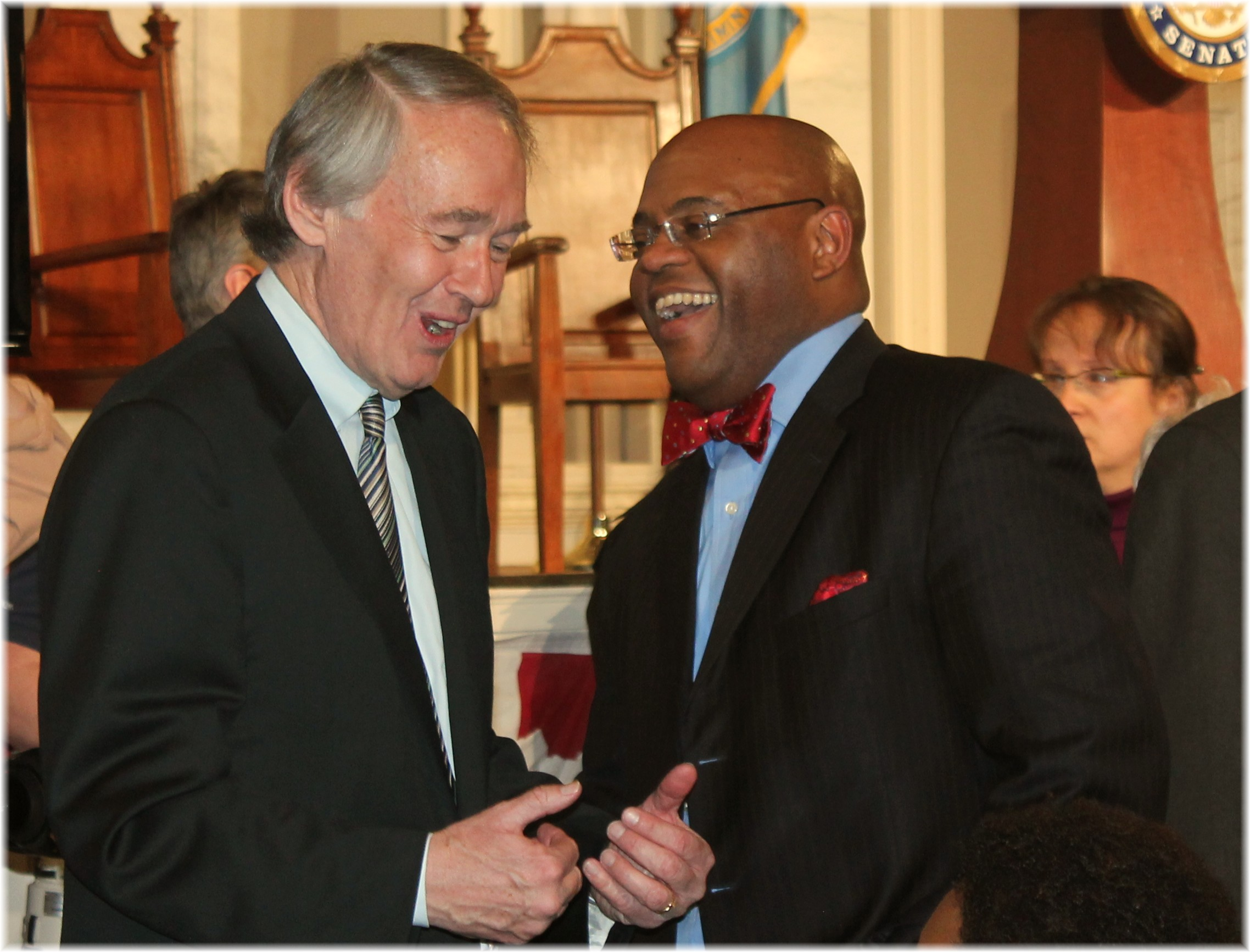
Cowan (right) with then-U.S. Representative Ed Markey (left), his successor in the Senate, at a 2013 gathering

In December 2012, President Barack Obama announced the nomination of U.S. Senator and Foreign Relations Committee Chairman John Kerry to serve as Secretary of State, leaving a vacancy in the seat Kerry had held for 28 years. Under state law, the Massachusetts House of Representatives grants the governor of Massachusetts the right to fill vacant U.S. Senate seats with an interim appointment. Governor Deval Patrick announced that he was looking at "out of the box candidates" who had never run for office, and would hold the seat temporarily, forgoing a run in the special election.

On January 30, 2013, Patrick announced the appointment of Cowan to the seat. Cowan became Massachusetts's second African-American U.S. Senator after Edward Brooke. He served alongside Tim Scott of South Carolina, the first time that two African-Americans served simultaneously in the Senate. Cowan's term officially began on February 1, 2013, once Kerry's resignation took effect. He was sworn in by Vice President Joe Biden on February 7. The term ended on July 15, 2013, when Ed Markey was sworn in following the special election.

=== Committee assignments ===
- Committee on Agriculture, Nutrition and Forestry
  - Subcommittee on Jobs, Rural Economic Growth and Energy Innovation
  - Subcommittee on Livestock, Dairy, Poultry, Marketing and Agriculture Security
  - Subcommittee on Nutrition, Specialty Crops, Food and Agricultural Research (chair)
- Committee on Commerce, Science and Transportation
  - Subcommittee on Aviation Operations, Safety, and Security
  - Subcommittee on Communications, Technology, and the Internet
  - Subcommittee on Competitiveness, Innovation, and Export Promotion
  - Subcommittee on Consumer Protection, Product Safety, and Insurance
  - Subcommittee on Oceans, Atmosphere, Fisheries, and Coast Guard
  - Subcommittee on Science and Space
  - Subcommittee on Surface Transportation and Merchant Marine Infrastructure, Safety, and Security
- Committee on Small Business and Entrepreneurship

== Personal life ==
He is married to Stacy Cowan. She also is a lawyer. They have two sons, Miles and Grant, and live in Westwood, Massachusetts. He received an honorary degree from Georgetown University in 2013 and spoke at the commencement ceremony for the McDonough School of Business.

== See also ==
- List of African-American United States senators

U.S. Senate
Preceded by John Kerry	United States Senator (Class 2) from Massachusetts; 2013; Served alongside: Elizabeth Warren	Succeeded by Ed Markey
U.S. order of precedence (ceremonial)
Preceded by Scott Brown as Former U.S. Senator	Order of precedence of the United States	Succeeded by Roland Burris as Former U.S. Senator
