= U.S. Senate career of JD Vance =

Career of JD Vance in the United States Senate

JD Vance
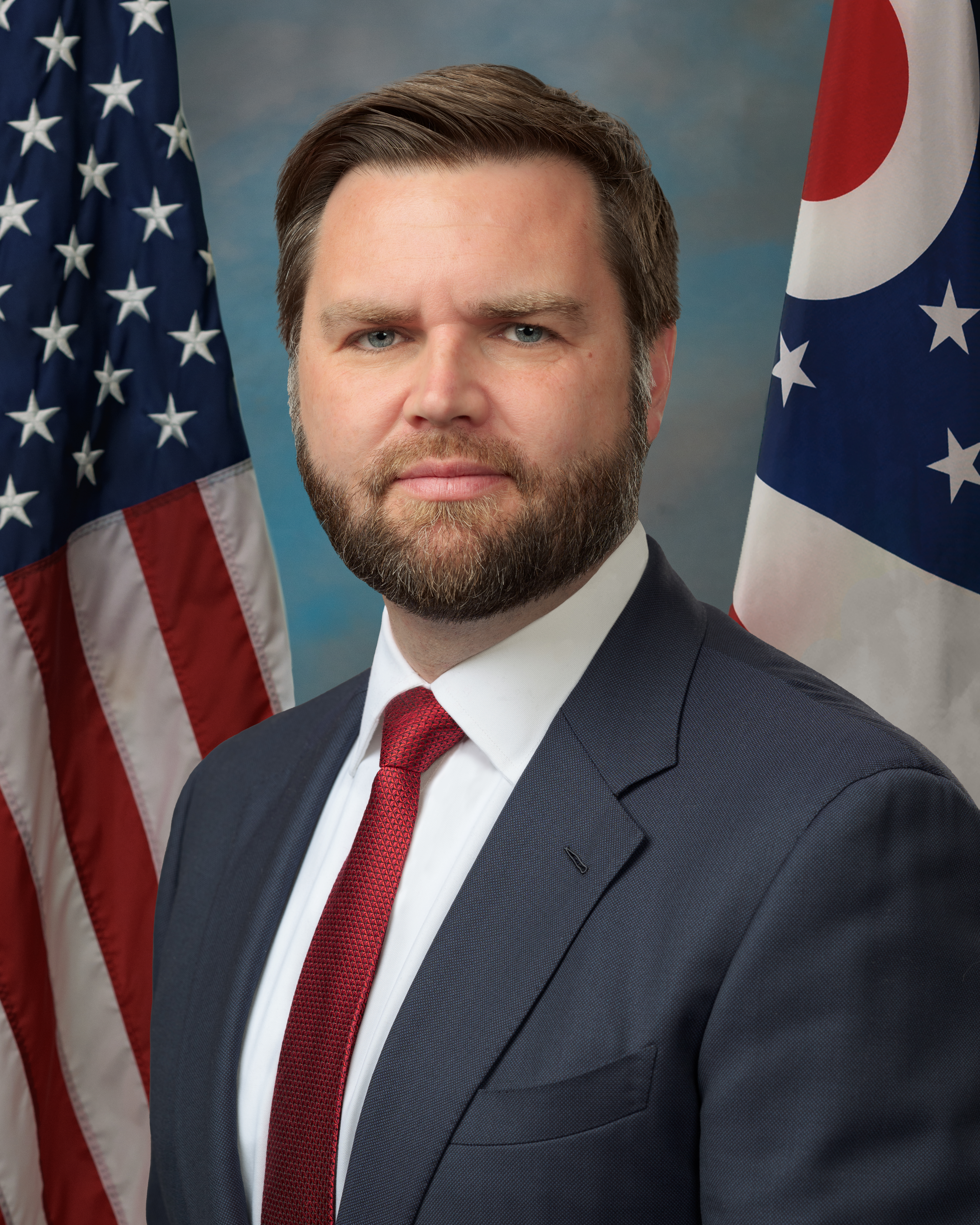
- Vance in 2023, during the 118th Congress

President of the United States Senate
- Incumbent
- Assumed office January 20, 2025
- President pro tem: Chuck Grassley
- Preceded by: Kamala Harris

United States Senator from Ohio
- In office January 3, 2023 – January 10, 2025
- Preceded by: Rob Portman
- Succeeded by: Jon Husted

JD Vance served in the United States Senate from January 3, 2023, to January 10, 2025. A member of the Republican Party from the state of Ohio, Vance previously served in the United States Marine Corps from 2003 to 2007. He resigned his seat in the Senate upon being elected Vice President of the United States, making him President of the Senate.

Following incumbent Republican Rob Portman's announcement that he would not seek re-election, Vance declared his candidacy for the United States Senate. He defeated multiple opponents in the Republican primary and went on to defeat Democratic nominee Tim Ryan in the general election. Upon assuming office at the age of 38, he became the first Millennial Republican senator and the first US senator from Ohio without previous political experience since John Glenn in 1974. In 2023, he was described as a "rising star" within the Republican Party and was named to the Time 100 Next List. During his tenure, he was the youngest Republican member of the Senate and was widely noted for his Appalachian origin and poor white upbringing.

As a senator, Vance responded to the East Palestine, Ohio train derailment, supported efforts to strengthen border security during the Mexico–United States border crisis, drafted legislation to combat the 2021–2023 inflation surge, and opposed American military aid to Ukraine. In July 2024, he was selected as Donald Trump's running mate in the 2024 United States presidential election. Their ticket went on to win the election, defeating the Democratic ticket of Kamala Harris and Tim Walz. During the transition, Vance continued to serve in the Senate, co-sponsoring the Laken Riley Act. His Senate tenure coincided with the last two years of the Biden administration.

Vance served in the senate minority during the first two years of his term, serving as Ohio's junior senator alongside Democrat Sherrod Brown. After Brown lost re-election, Vance became Ohio's senior senator for the first week of the 119th United States Congress, serving alongside Republican Bernie Moreno. At midnight on January 10, 2025, Vance resigned from the Senate in anticipation of his inauguration as the 50th Vice President of the United States on January 20, 2025.

== 2022 U.S. Senate campaign in Ohio ==
Final results by Ohio county in 2022: JD Vance: 80–90%; 70–80%; 60–70%; 50–60%; Tim Ryan: 60–70%; 50–60%

In early 2018, Vance considered running for the U.S. Senate against Sherrod Brown, but did not. In March 2021, Peter Thiel gave $10 million to Protect Ohio Values, a super PAC created in February to support a potential Vance candidacy. This is the most significant amount ever given to a single Senate candidate. Robert Mercer also gave an undisclosed amount. In April, Vance expressed interest in running for the Senate seat being vacated by Rob Portman. In May, he launched an exploratory committee. Vance announced his Senate campaign in Ohio on July 1, 2021. On April 15, 2022, Trump endorsed Vance, who had criticized him in the past. Far-right political commentator Nick Fuentes was an outspoken critic of Vance's Senate campaign and tenure, stating that "Most people don't go from nobody to Senator;" and that Peter Thiel was specifically lobbying for Vance to run for office to benefit his venture capital firm.

Vance had been trailing in the polls, but as a result of Trump's support, he surged to become the race's frontrunner for the first time and led in most polls up to election day. Meanwhile, State Senator Matt Dolan, who disavowed Trump's false claims of voter fraud in the 2020 United States presidential election, saw a late surge after buying ad time. Vance won with 32% of the vote with Former state treasurer Josh Mandel in second and Dolan in a close third. The primary was considered by many as a test of Trump's influence over the Republican Party as he won Ohio by 8 points in 2020. The primary was also the most expensive in the state's history, with the candidates spending a combined $66 million throughout the campaign. On May 3, 2022, Vance won the Republican primary with 32% of the vote, defeating multiple candidates, including Mandel (23%) and Dolan (22%). On November 8, in the general election, Vance defeated Democratic nominee Tim Ryan with 53% of the vote to Ryan's 47%. This vote share was considered a vast underperformance compared to other Ohio Republicans, especially in the coinciding gubernatorial election. Vance had often previously spelled his name with periods after his initials ("J.D.")—including in the publication of Hillbilly Elegy—but after becoming a candidate for office, he removed the periods ("JD").

2022 United States Senate Republican primary results in Ohio
Party	Candidate	Votes	%
Republican	JD Vance	344,736	32.22%
Republican	Josh Mandel	255,854	23.92%
Republican	Matt Dolan	249,239	23.30%
Republican	Mike Gibbons	124,653	11.65%
Republican	Jane Timken	62,779	5.87%
Republican	Mark Pukita	22,692	2.12%
Republican	Neil Patel	9,873	0.92%
Total votes		1,069,826	100.0%

2022 United States Senate election in Ohio
Party	Candidate	Votes	%	±%
Republican	JD Vance	2,192,114	53.04%	N/A
Democratic	Tim Ryan	1,939,489	46.92%	N/A
Write-in		1,739	0.04%	N/A
Total votes		4,133,342	100.0%	N/A
Republican hold				

== Committee assignments ==
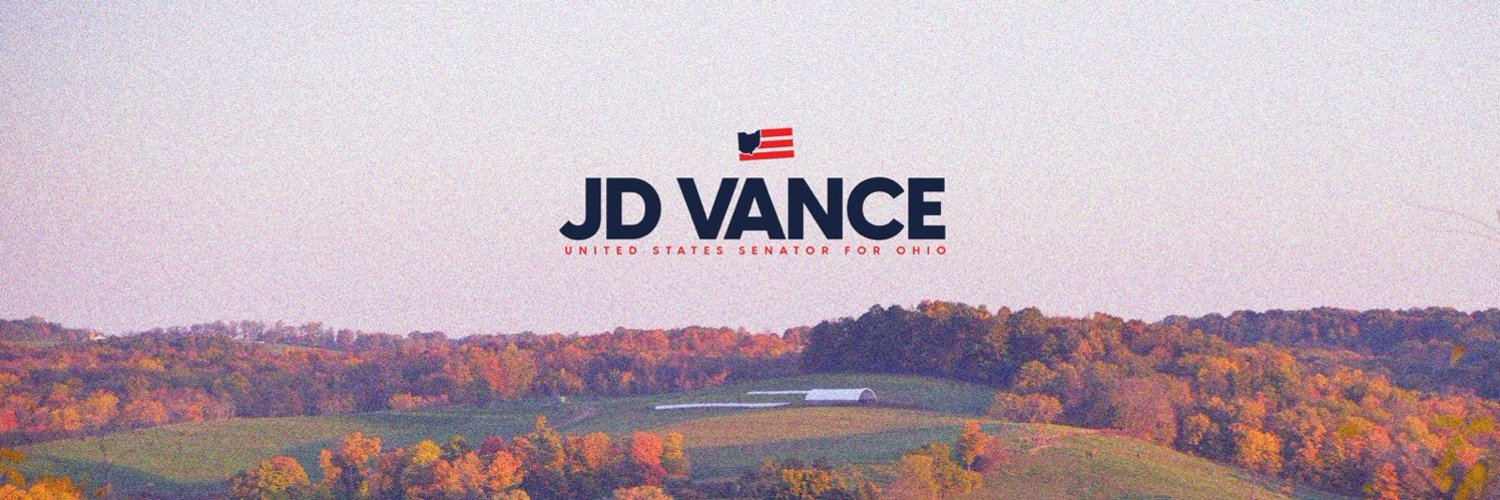
Vance's official senatorial Twitter account header photo

- Senate Committee on Banking, Housing, and Urban Affairs
  - Financial Institutions and Consumer Protection subcommittee
  - Housing, Transportation, and Community Development subcommittee
  - Securities, Insurance, and Investment subcommittee
- Senate Committee on Commerce, Science, and Transportation
  - Communications, Media, and Broadband subcommittee
  - Oceans, Fisheries, Climate Change, and Manufacturing subcommittee
  - Space and Science subcommittee
- Senate Special Committee on Aging

== Tenure ==
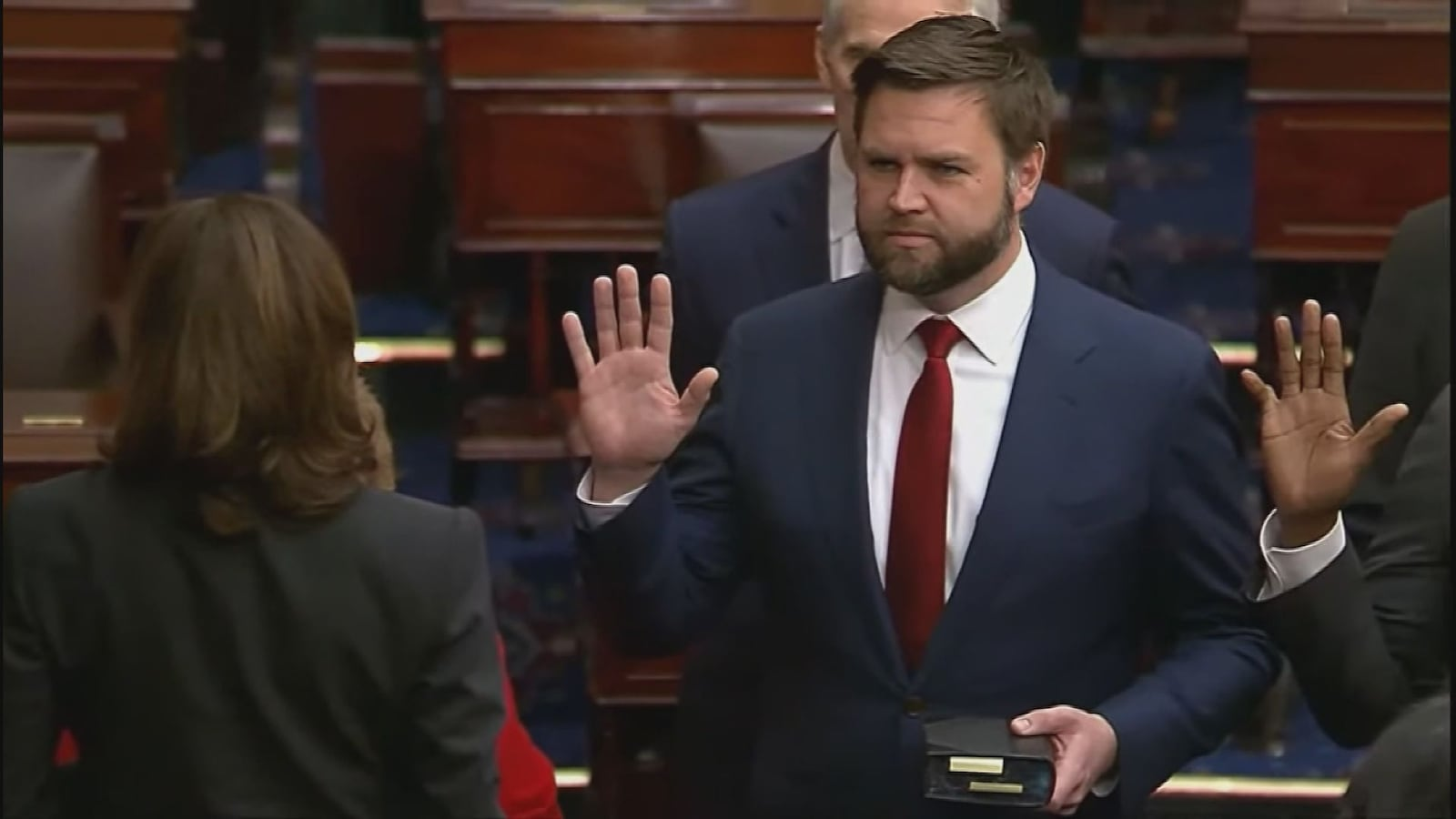
Vance is sworn into the Senate by Vice President Kamala Harris; January 3, 2023

On January 3, 2023, Vance was sworn in to the US Senate, as a member of the 118th United States Congress. He was the first US senator from Ohio without previous political experience since John Glenn, who took office in 1974.

On February 7, 2023, Vance attended the 2023 State of the Union Address, delivered by 46th president of the United States Joe Biden.

Vance criticized the Biden administration for what he saw as a lackluster response to the East Palestine, Ohio, train derailment. The Biden administration said that federal investigators were on scene soon after the derailment, although it later sent Transportation Secretary Pete Buttigieg to visit the scene as well.

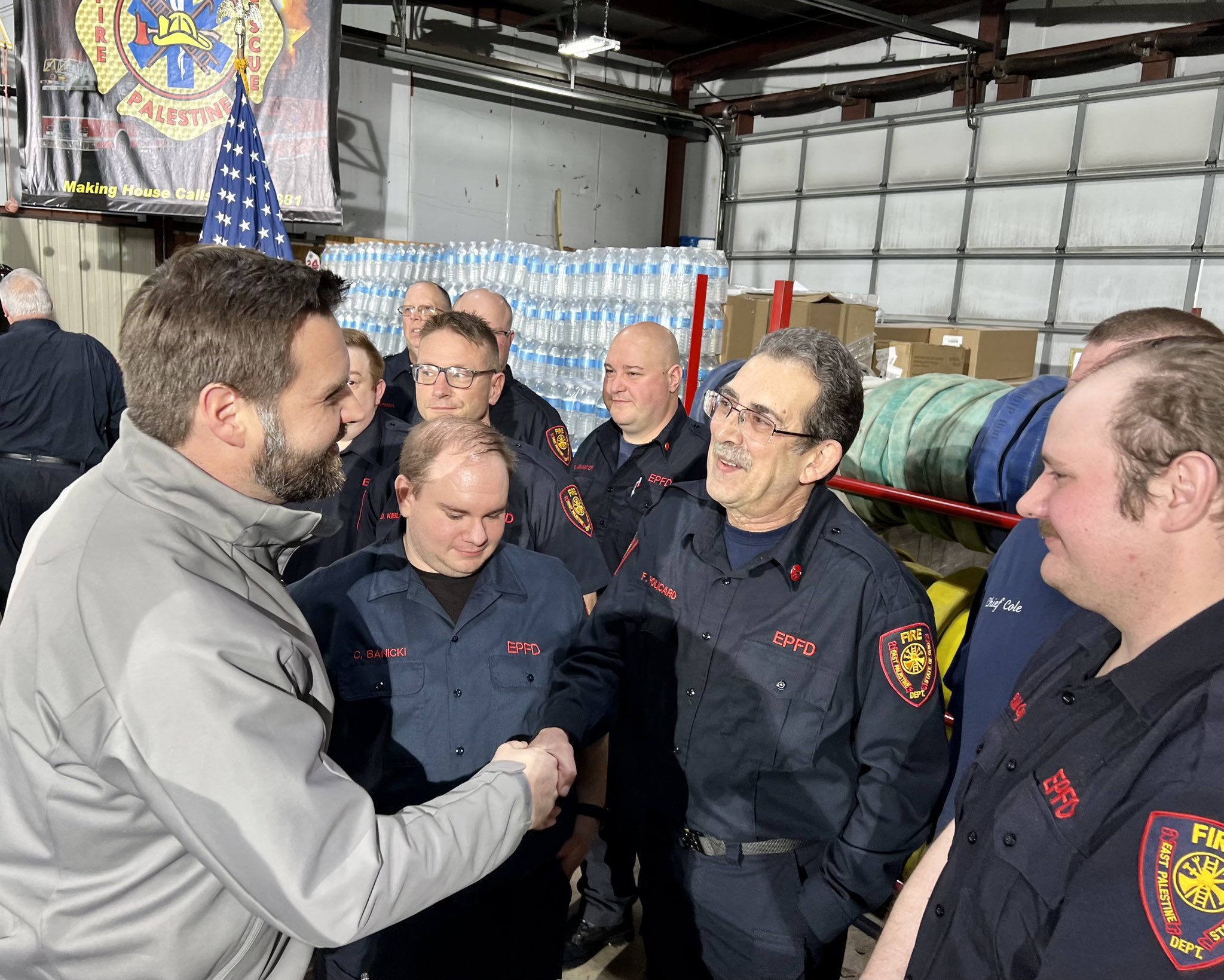
Vance thanking first responders in East Palestine, February 2023

On February 26, 2023, Vance wrote an op-ed in The Washington Post, supporting the provision of PPP style funds to those affected by the derailment, which some Republican senators criticized.

On March 1, 2023, Vance and Senators Sherrod Brown, John Fetterman, Bob Casey, Josh Hawley, and Marco Rubio proposed bipartisan legislation to prevent derailments like the one in East Palestine.

On May 25, 2023, Vance visited the 121st Air Refueling Wing at Rickenbacker Air National Guard Base in Franklin County, Ohio.

In June 2023, Vance voted against raising the debt ceiling, standing against final passage of the Fiscal Responsibility Act of 2023 and saying it would result in "a reduced military in the face of a rising threat from China".

Vance's 34-minute speech on the state of the United States Foreign Policy in April 2024

In June 2023, Vance worked with Senator Elizabeth Warren of Massachusetts to claw back executive pay when big banks fail.

In July 2023, Vance and Representative Marjorie Taylor Greene introduced legislation that would have made gender-affirming care for minors a federal crime, with penalties of up to 12 years in prison.

On August 2, 2023, Vance's 39th birthday, he attended the 168th Ohio State Fair with his family.

Vance joined a picket line during the 2023 United Auto Workers strike, having appeared at Stellantis Toledo Assembly.

On March 7, 2024, Vance attended the 2024 State of the Union Address, delivered by President Biden.

In March 2024, Vance and Senator Sheldon Whitehouse introduced the Stop Subsidizing Giant Mergers Act, which would end tax-free treatment for corporate mergers and acquisitions of companies above a certain threshold.

On May 9, 2024, Vance and Senators Marco Rubio and Josh Hawley sent a letter to President Biden demanding he block the proposed acquisition of U.S. Steel by Nippon Steel.

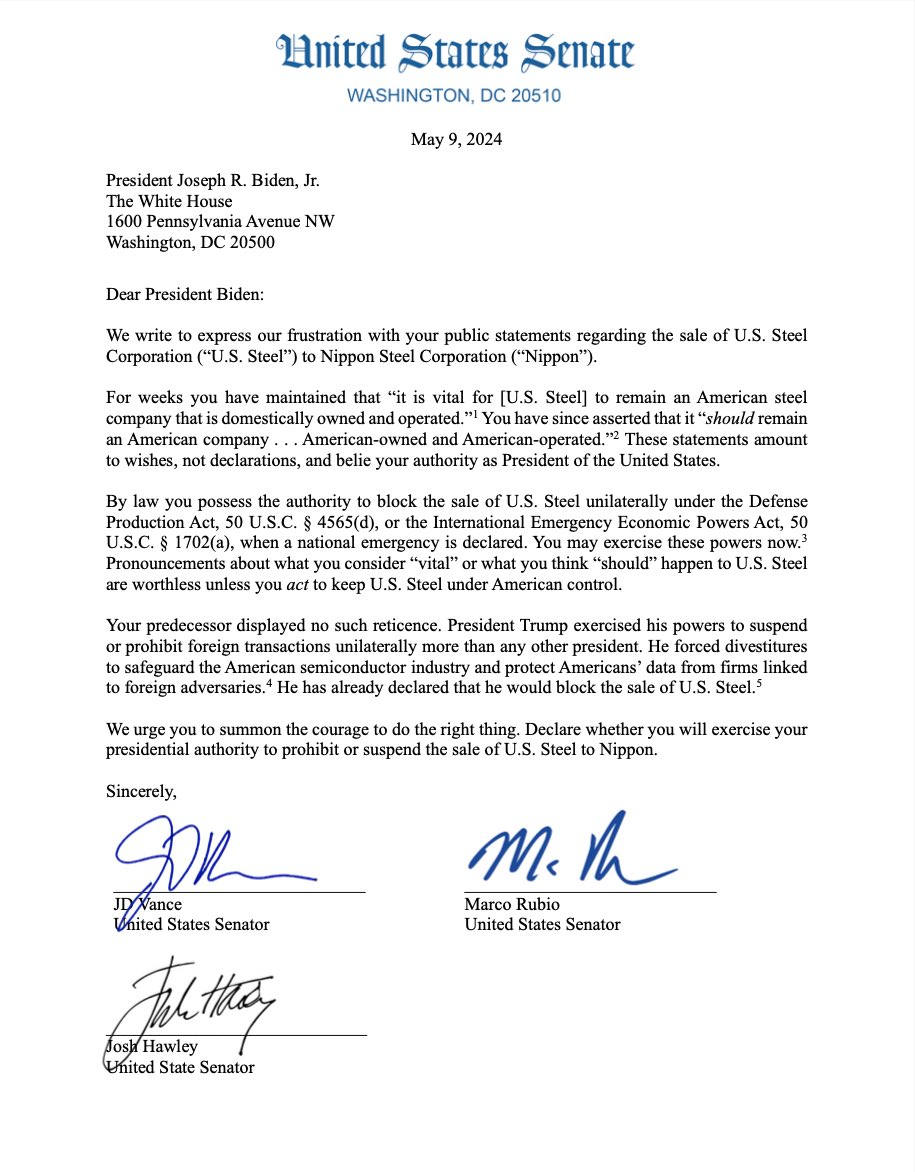
Letter to President Biden from Senators Vance, Rubio, and Hawley

In June 2024, Vance sponsored the Dismantle DEI Act, which would ban federal diversity, equity, and inclusion programs and funding for agencies, contractors, and organizations receiving federal funds.

In July 2024, Vance co-sponsored a bill with Senator Raphael Warnock of Georgia to lower the price of insulin.

On July 15, 2024, after much speculation, Vance was selected as Donald Trump's running mate in the 2024 United States presidential election. Later that same day, Vance formally accepted his party's nomination for vice president of the United States at the 2024 Republican National Convention in Milwaukee, Wisconsin.

Vance was not present for any Senate votes during his vice-presidential campaign.

After the Withdrawal of Joe Biden from the 2024 United States presidential election, Vance called on Biden to resign from office.

On September 11, 2024, Vance and Trump attended the 23rd anniversary commemoration of the September 11 attacks at the 9/11 Memorial in New York City.

On November 5, 2024, Vance was elected the 50th vice president of the United States, serving as vice president-elect concurrent to his role as a senator until his resignation.

On December 14, 2024, Vance attended the 2024 Army–Navy Game, alongside Trump, Elon Musk, Daniel Penny, Pete Hegseth, Ron DeSantis, Mike Johnson, John Thune, Dave McCormick, Tulsi Gabbard, Joe Manchin, Vivek Ramaswamy, Kash Patel, Susie Wiles, Mike Waltz, Julia Nesheiwat, Will Cain, and Jason Miller.

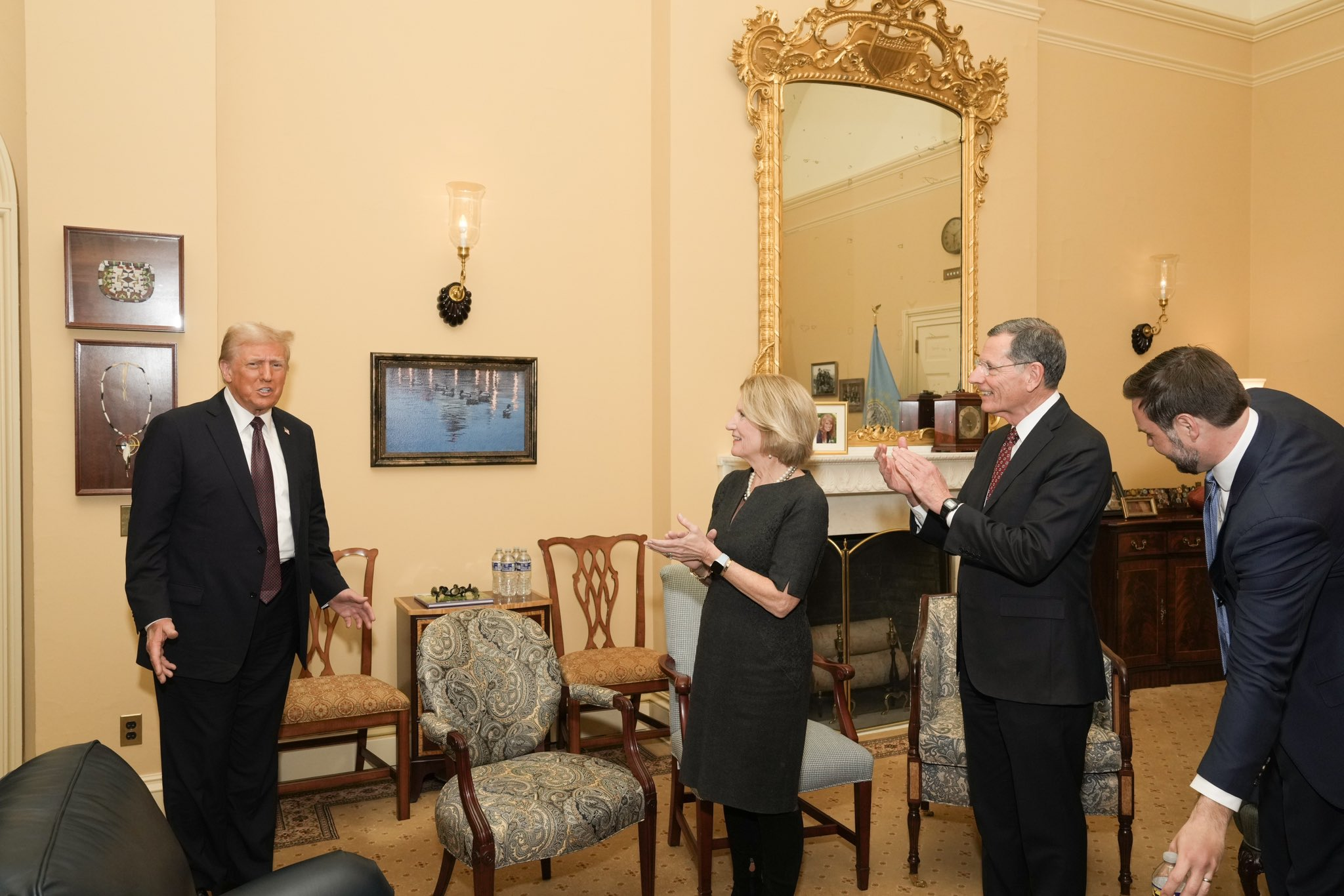
Vance and his Republican Senate colleagues meeting with President-elect Trump, January 8, 2025

Following the defeat of Sherrod Brown in the 2024 United States Senate election in Ohio, Vance became Ohio's senior senator on January 3, 2025, after the swearing-in of Bernie Moreno.

On January 6, 2025, Vance voted to certify the results of the 2024 U.S. presidential election.

On January 9, 2025, Vance attended the funeral of Jimmy Carter, alongside the current and living former vice presidents.

Vance served for the first seven days of the 119th United States Congress before resigning on January 10, 2025 in preparation to assume the vice presidency.

== Domestic policy ==
=== Abortion ===
In January 2023 Vance advocated for the U.S. Department of Justice to enforce the Comstock Act of 1873 to ban the mailing of drugs that induce abortion. In June 2024, the Supreme Court at least temporarily preserved access to mifepristone, after which Trump said during a debate that he "agree[d] with their decision" and would not "block" the drug. In July, a week before Vance was announced as Trump's running mate, Vance told NBC's Meet the Press that he likewise supported access to mifepristone.

Vance also signed a letter to Health and Human Services Secretary Xavier Becerra requesting the withdrawal of a privacy rule preventing law enforcement from accessing abortion related health records.

In August 2024, Vance was interviewed by Laura Ingraham, who brought up that suburban women are worried that abortion could be banned nationwide. He responded: "I don't buy that ... I think most suburban women care about the normal things most Americans care about right now." Vance also said that, if Congress passed a national abortion ban, Trump would and should veto it.

During the October 1, 2024, vice-presidential nominees' debate, Vance said he "never supported a national ban" on abortion, despite having said in 2022 that he "certainly would like abortion to be illegal nationally" and pledging during his 2022 Senate campaign to "end abortion".

=== Economic policy ===
Vance's economic views in the Senate have been described as "economic populism" and sometimes "economic nationalism". This view has elements of protectionism, particularly with regard to re-shoring of American industry, especially manufacturing, and protecting American jobs more generally. Vance has also expressed openness to a weaker U.S. dollar as a reserve currency, in order for American exports to be more competitive with other markets. His economic views are considered unorthodox in the Republican Party. He supports tariffs and antitrust policy. His open support for striking auto workers, in particular, surprised many in the party. While Vance has indicated opposition to tax increases overall, he supports increases for certain taxes on university endowments, corporate mergers, and large multinationals. He supports increasing the minimum wage and is highly skeptical of the economic and social contributions of large corporations.

Vance has expressed concern that large tech companies have too much influence in politics and the flow of information and has called to "break up" Google, as well as implying he believes Meta should be split up. He has said that Federal Trade Commission (FTC) chair Lina Khan is "doing a pretty good job", citing her antitrust enforcement against tech firms. Vance and Senator Sheldon Whitehouse introduced the Stop Subsidizing Giant Mergers Act, which would end tax-free treatment for corporate mergers and acquisitions of companies above a certain threshold.

In September 2024, Vance visited a Reading, Pennsylvania supermarket, where he complained that "a dozen eggs will cost you around $4" and blamed Kamala Harris for it. Video of Vance's visit showed that the store's price tag for a dozen eggs was under $3.

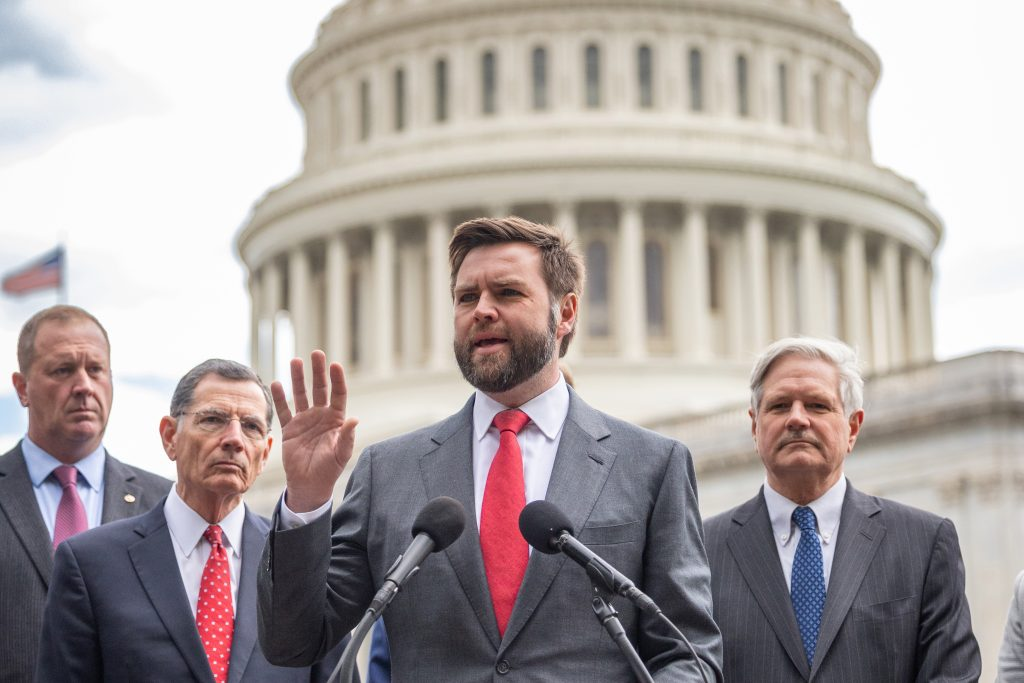
Vance Capitol Hill press conference

=== Labor unions ===
Vance has regularly framed himself as a union ally, even going so far as to explicitly support labor in the 2023 United Auto Workers strike, which many in his party criticized. Despite this, his legislative record has been criticized by some union leaders. Vance also opposes the PRO Act, which expands protections related to employees' rights to organize and collectively bargain, instead voicing support for proposals by the conservative group American Compass, which includes workers' councils and sectoral bargaining. Based on his voting record in the Senate, the AFL-CIO has scored him at 0% on its Legislative Scorecard. On the other hand, Teamsters President Sean O'Brien has praised Vance and other Republicans for "listening to unions and standing up to corporations", for which O'Brien was criticized by other union leaders, including from within the AFL-CIO and the Teamsters union itself. Vance has criticized "right-to-work" anti-trade union laws.

AFL-CIO president and Democratic Party lobbyist Liz Shuler has said: "A Trump–Vance administration would be a dream for corporate CEOs but a nightmare for workers. Sen. JD Vance likes to pose as a union supporter on the picket line, but his record proves to be a sham. He has introduced legislation to allow bosses to bypass their workers' unions with phony corporate-run unions, disparaged striking UAW members while collecting hefty donations from one of the major auto companies, and opposed the landmark Protecting the Right to Organize (PRO) Act, which would end union-busting 'right to work' laws and make it easier for workers to form unions and win strong contracts."

=== Social Security ===
Vance said in 2024 that he opposed cuts to Social Security or Medicare, and opposed privatizing Social Security. He has said concerns about the long-term solvency of the Social Security Trust Fund are overstated, and that increasing labor force participation and birth rate would sustain the system.

=== Immigration and border security ===
In 2023, Vance introduced a bill that would make English the United States' official language.

In September 2024, Vance falsely said "Haitian illegal immigrants" were "draining social services and generally causing chaos all over Springfield, Ohio. Reports now show that people have had their pets abducted and eaten by people who shouldn't be in this country". Both the Springfield city manager and the Springfield police responded that "there have been no credible reports or specific claims of pets being harmed, injured or abused by individuals within the immigrant community". Springfield authorities also said, "Haitian immigrants are here legally, under the Immigration Parole Program". Vance then said that it was "possible, of course, that all of these rumors will turn out to be false", but also told his supporters: "Keep the cat memes flowing."

After Vance's false claim about Haitians eating pets was disputed, he said: "Do you know what’s confirmed? That a child was murdered by a Haitian migrant who had no right to be here." The child's father responded: "My son, Aiden Clark, was not murdered. He was accidentally killed by an immigrant from Haiti." Aiden died in an accidental vehicular collision. His father accused "morally bankrupt politicians ... JD Vance and Donald Trump" of using Aiden's "death for political gain", saying "This needs to stop now", and wishing that "the incessant group of hate-spewing people would leave us alone". Vance also falsely alleged a "massive rise in communicable diseases" in Springfield, but Clark County's health commissioner reported having "not seen a substantial increase in all reportable communicable diseases" and that non-COVID reportable communicable diseases were lower in 2023 than anytime since 2016.

Later that month, Vance promoted conservative activist Christopher Rufo's allegation that African migrants were eating cats in Dayton, Ohio, and criticized Kamala Harris and the media, calling the allegation "another 'debunked' story that turned out to have merit". The allegation was based on an August 2023 video of skinned animals being grilled, which drew comments that the animals resembled chickens. Dayton police responded, "there is no evidence to even remotely suggest that any group, including our immigrant community, is engaged in eating pets". Dayton Mayor Jeffrey Mims reported "absolutely zero reports of this type of activity". Vance continued to defend his false claim that Haitian migrants eat cats, saying he was willing "to create stories so that the American media actually pays attention … we're creating a story, meaning we're creating the American media focusing on it." Although many Haitian migrants were legal immigrants with temporary protected status, Vance said that since the Biden administration's "border policy [is] a disgrace … I'm still going to call [the migrants] illegal aliens."

=== Health policy ===
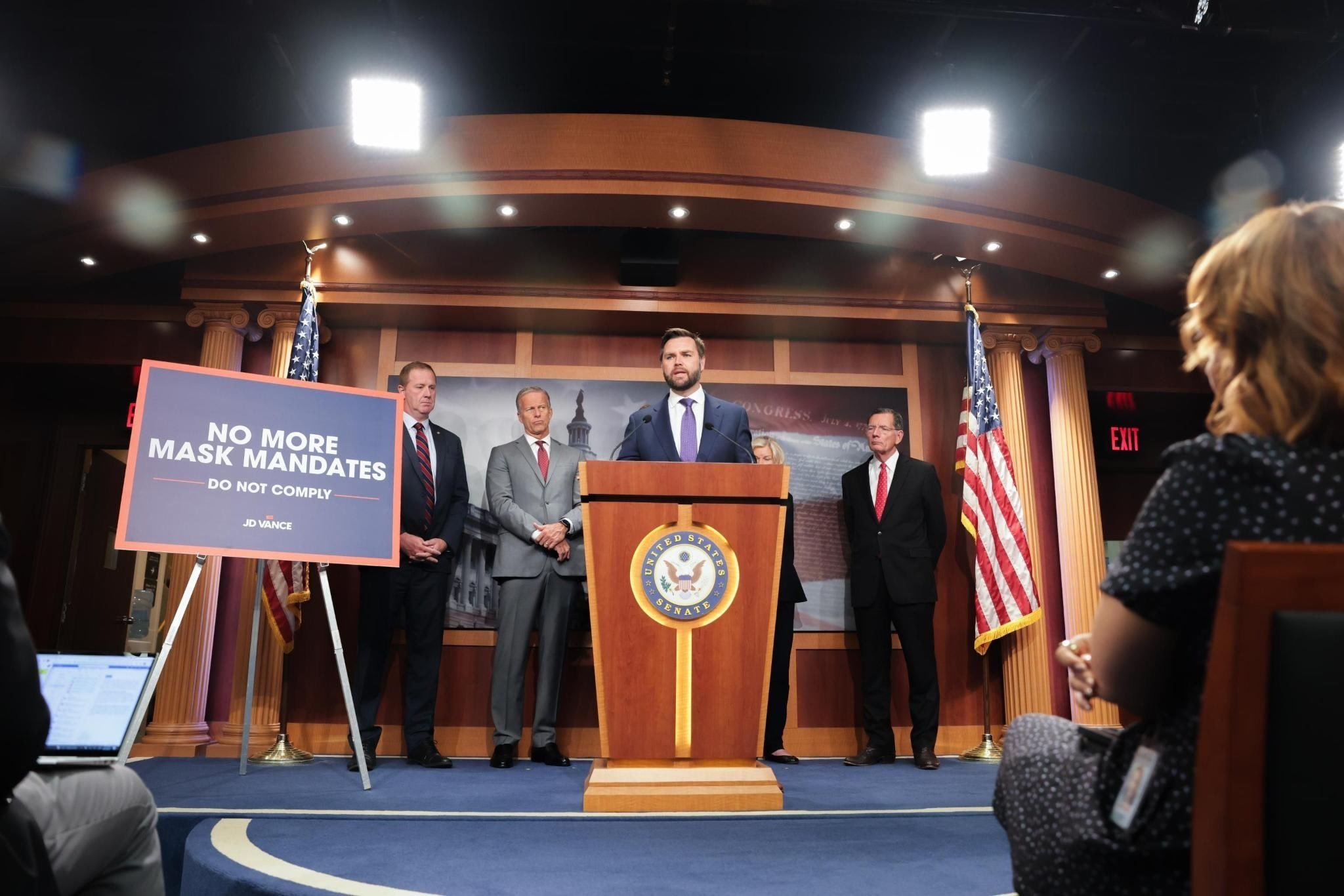
Vance anti-mask mandate press conference, 2023

In September 2023, Vance introduced his "Freedom to Breathe" bill to prevent federal agencies from requiring masks on commercial airlines, on public transit, and in public schools, and to prevent those industries from refusing to serve people who don't wear a mask. He claimed that mask mandates "failed to control the spread of respiratory viruses", "violated basic bodily freedom", and were "unscientific". In Senate remarks, he said children "need us to not be Chicken Little about every single respiratory pandemic and problem that confronts this country".

== Foreign policy ==
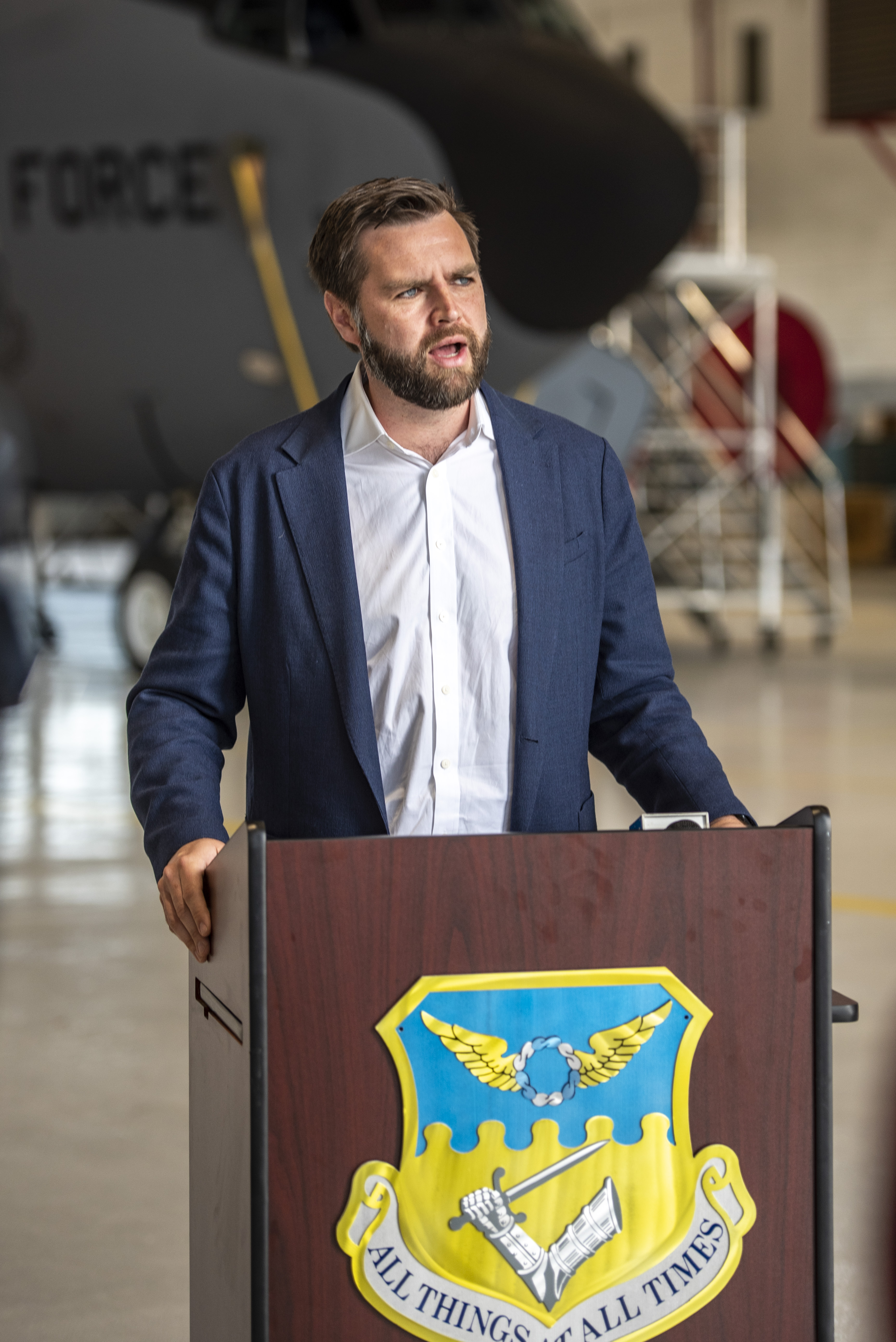
Vance visiting the 121st Air Refueling Wing at Rickenbacker Air National Guard Base, 2023

=== International organizations ===
At the 2024 Munich Security Conference, Vance said the U.S. did not want to pull out of the North Atlantic Treaty Organization (NATO), but argued the U.S. should shift its focus to East Asia, and that certain European and NATO member countries were not spending enough for their own security.

=== China ===
Vance called China "the biggest threat" to the U.S. and argued that the war in Ukraine is distracting the U.S. from focusing on the threat from China. He believes that China is the source of many American problems. He has said that the U.S. is "flooded with cheap Chinese goods, with cheap foreign labor and, in the decades to come, deadly Chinese fentanyl".

At the Munich Security Conference in 2024, Vance said U.S. foreign policy should pivot from Europe to East Asia: "The United States has to focus more on East Asia. That is going to be the future of U.S. foreign policy for the next 40 years, and Europe has to wake up to that fact."

=== Germany ===
In December 2024, responding to a post by Foundation for Defense of Democracies fellow Ivana Stradner criticizing Elon Musk's support for the far-right Alternative for Germany (AfD) party, Vance sarcastically replied by saying "It’s so dangerous for people to control their borders. So so dangerous. The dangerous level is off the charts" and continued by saying "I wonder how much money this person’s employer gets from the American taxpayer?". In January 2025, he said that while he is "not endorsing a party in the German elections", he said an article by Musk titled Only the AfD Can Save Germany was "interesting". He also claimed while American media "slanders AfD as Nazi-lite", the party "is most popular in the same areas of Germany that were most resistant to the Nazis."

=== Israel ===
Vance is a strong supporter of Israel and has said "culturally, morally, politically, it is a real ally in the sense that we're not just sort of sharing interests, we're actually sharing common values."

Vance has been called a "steadfast supporter of Israel throughout the country's war in Gaza". He supports U.S. funding Israel in the Gaza war. He has said that Israel should win and end the war in Gaza "as quickly as possible" to enable the "Israelis and the Sunni Arab states" to form a united front against Iran. Vance has criticized the Biden administration for "depriving the Israelis of the precision-guided weapons" the country needs, and said that Hamas bears full responsibility for all civilian deaths. He criticized Biden in April 2024 for "micromanaging" Israeli actions in the war, saying, "you've got to, first of all, enable Israel to actually finish the job".

Vance repeated his criticism of the Biden administration in July 2024, saying: "Number one, you want Israel to get this war over and as quickly as possible because the longer it goes on, the harder their situation becomes. But second, after the war you want to reinvigorate that peace process between Israel, Saudi Arabia, the Jordanians, and so forth". More broadly, he has said, "We want the Israelis and the Sunnis to police their own region of the world."

In an October 2024 interview, Vance said: "Israel has the right to defend itself, but America's interest is sometimes going to be distinct. Sometimes we're going to have overlapping interests and sometimes we're going to have distinct interests. And our interest, I think, very much is in not going to war with Iran."

=== Iran ===
When asked in October 2023 whether he would support military action against Iran after militias allegedly connected to Iran attacked U.S. troops, Vance said it would be a "mistake", citing concern about significant escalation. After his nomination as Trump's running mate, Vance praised the 2020 assassination of Iranian general Qasem Soleimani, adding: "If you're gonna punch the Iranians, punch them hard."

=== Iraq ===
In a 2024 speech, Vance said that "in 2003, I made the mistake of supporting the Iraq War", which he had served in as a combat correspondent in the Marine Corps, but that he later realized "that I had been lied to that the promises of the foreign policy establishment were a complete joke."

=== Russia–Ukraine war ===
In a 2022 interview with Steve Bannon days before the Russian invasion of Ukraine, Vance said, "I don't really care what happens to Ukraine one way or the other. I do care about the fact that in my community right now the leading cause of death among 18- to 45-year-olds is Mexican fentanyl that's coming across the southern border." Vance is a vocal critic of U.S. military aid to Ukraine in the ongoing Russo–Ukrainian War and has faced bipartisan criticism for that view. In February 2024, he said, "Given the realities that we face, the very real constraints in munitions and [Ukraine's] manpower, what is reasonable to accomplish and when do we actually think we're going to accomplish it? And my argument is, look, I think what's reasonable to accomplish is some negotiated peace."

In April 2024, Vance voted against an aid package for Ukraine; in a New York Times essay, he wrote that he remained "opposed to virtually any proposal for the United States to continue funding this war" and argued that U.S. aid would not change the trajectory of the war. He argues that Ukraine should adopt a "defensive strategy" to "preserve its precious military manpower, stop the bleeding and provide time for negotiations to commence"; that the U.S. and Ukraine must "accept that Mr. Zelensky's stated goal for the war—a return to 1991 boundaries—is fantastical"; and that "Ukraine is going to have to cede some territory to the Russians".

In December 2023, Vance was criticized for calling for the suspension of further aid to Ukraine because he said it would be used so its ministers "can buy a bigger yacht". He has criticized the Ukrainian government for corruption, and contends that the Biden administration has not properly audited aid to Ukraine.

In interviews and statements in 2024, Vance said that he did not want Russia to conquer Ukraine, but supported a "freeze" of "the territorial lines somewhere close to where they are right now"; guarantees of Kyiv's neutrality and exclusion of Ukraine from NATO (a key Russian demand); and providing "some American security assistance over the long term." Vance and Trump's special envoy Keith Kellogg said that continued arms shipments to Ukraine and a heavily fortified demilitarised zone would ensure that Russia would not launch another invasion.

=== United Kingdom ===
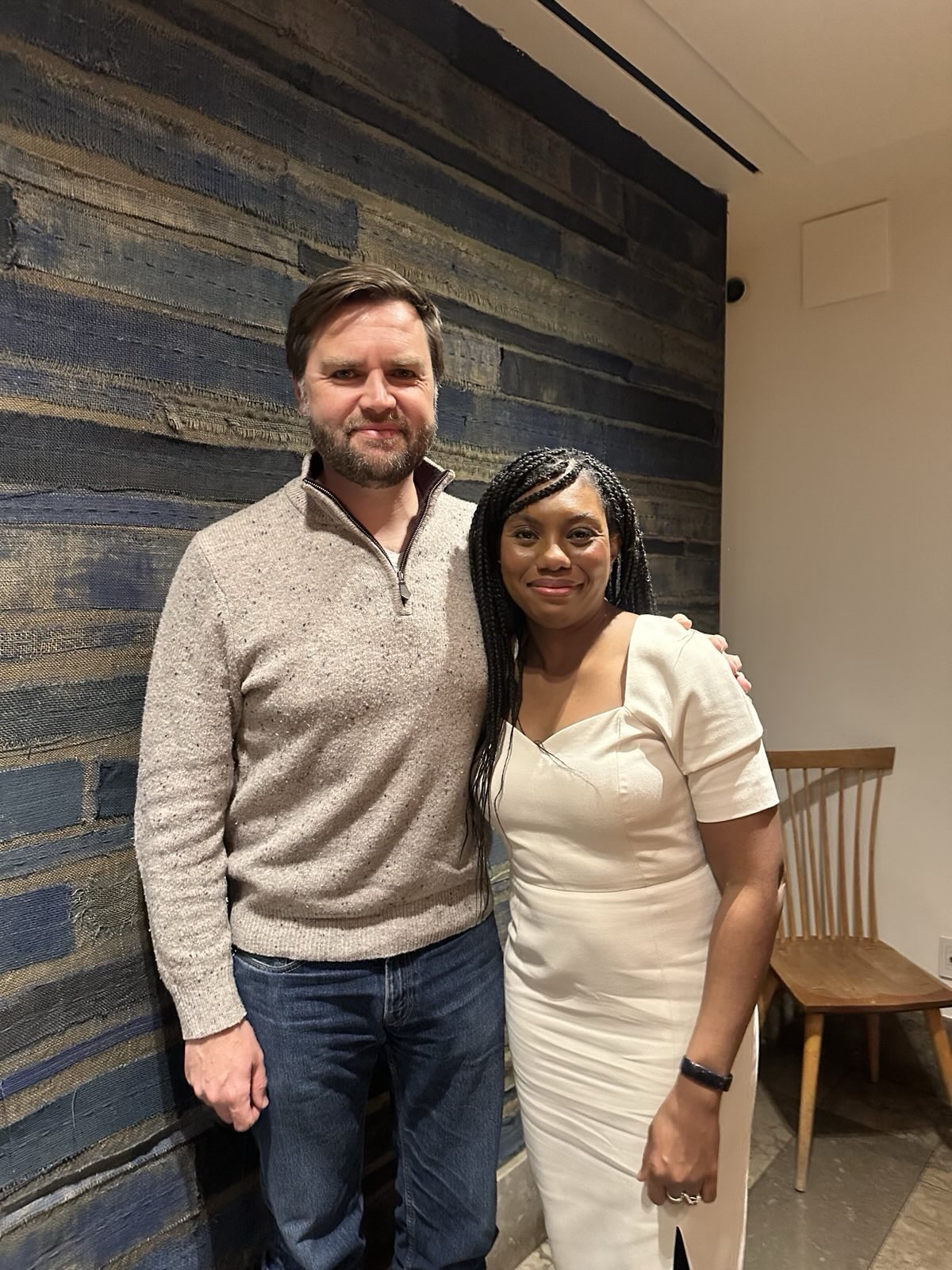
Vance with UK Leader of the Opposition Kemi Badenoch, 2024

In July 2024, after the British Labour Party won a landslide victory in the 2024 United Kingdom general election, Vance said in a speech at the National Conservatism Convention: "I was talking with a friend recently ... what is the first truly Islamist country that will get a nuclear weapon? And we were like, 'maybe it's Iran, maybe Pakistan already kind of counts', and then we sort of finally decided maybe it's actually the UK, since Labour just took over".

Senior British officials, such as Angela Rayner, James Murray, and Andrew Bowie dismissed this statement, which echoed right-wing characterizations of Britain and Europe. Nevertheless, Vance and British foreign secretary David Lammy have described each other as friends, and Vance's foreign policy advisor, Elbridge Colby, called Lammy "far preferable" to his Conservative predecessor, David Cameron.

== Resignation and replacement in the U.S. Senate ==
Republican nominee, Donald Trump selected Senator JD Vance to be his running mate in the 2024 United States presidential election, and Vance accepted. Vance was elected the 50th Vice President of the United States in an election.

Due to his and then-former President Donald Trump's victory in the 2024 presidential election, Vance announced on January 9, 2025 his plan to resign his Senate seat, effective January 10. On January 21, 2025, Vance swore in Lieutenant Governor of Ohio Jon Husted as his replacement after he was appointed by Ohio governor Mike DeWine.

== See also ==
- Political positions of JD Vance
- Vice presidency of JD Vance (2025–present)
- Second presidency of Donald Trump (2025–present)
- Second cabinet of Donald Trump (2025–present)
- Second presidential transition of Donald Trump (2024–2025)
- Second inauguration of Donald Trump
- 2024 United States presidential election
