= United States House Committee on Manufactures =

United States House Committee on Manufactures was a standing committee of the U.S. House from 1819 to 1911.

On December 8, 1819, an amendment was accepted in the House to separate the Committee on Commerce and Manufactures into the Committee on Commerce and Committee on Manufacturers. This followed a request from Philadelphia manufacturers for a separate committee, stating in a presentation to the House in 1815 that the Committee on Commerce and Manufactures was inadequate to represent manufacturing interests. An argument for the separate committees was that commerce and manufactures often had conflicting interests.

The Committee on Manufactures was assigned jurisdiction over matters relating "to the manufacturing industries." The Committee on Manufactures became inactive during the later years of its existence and was eliminated in 1911, at the beginning of the 62nd Congress.

First father-son pair to chair the same House Committee: Former President and Massachusetts Representative John Quincy Adams chaired the Committee on Manufactures from 1831 to 1841 and again from 1843 to 1847. His son, Charles Francis Adams of Massachusetts, chaired the same committee during the 36th Congress (1859–1861). Two other father-son pairs have since chaired the same committee.

Records of the Committee on Manufactures, 16th-61st Congresses (1819-1911), are held at the National Archives.
