= United States House Committee on Commerce and Manufactures =

The United States House Committee on Commerce and Manufactures was a standing committee of the U.S. House from 1795 until 1819, when the two initially related subjects were split into the Committee on Commerce and the Committee on Manufactures. Its related committee in the U.S. Senate was the Senate Committee on Commerce and Manufactures, which was established in 1816, and similarly split in 1825.

The committee's commercial aspects, issues and jurisdiction follow through the Committee on Commerce from 1819 to 1892, the Committee on Interstate and Foreign Commerce from 1892 to 1968. With the relatively recent addition of issues and jurisdiction related to energy, commerce is now within the United States House Committee on Energy and Commerce.

== History and jurisdiction ==
The standing Committee on Commerce and Manufactures was created in December 1795 to "take into consideration all such petitions and matters of things touching the commerce and manufactures of the United States, as shall be presented, or shall or may come into question, and be referred to them by the House, and to report their opinion thereupon, together with such propositions for relief therein, as to them shall be expedient." The records of the Committee on Commerce and Manufactures, during the 4th to 15th Congresses include many petitions and memorials and committee papers.

The petitions and memorials referred to the committee cover a wide variety of topics. There are a large number of petitions concerning import duties. Manufacturers, merchants, and other citizens from many areas of the country petitioned Congress for duty increases on dozens of imported products such as hats, shot, paper, and cork. Records of the 15th Congress (1817-1819) contain the largest number of petitions relating to duties from a single Congress. Other petitioners requested relief from paying duties on certain goods. Merchants and ship owners, for example, requested that Congress not require payment of duties on goods damaged in shipment or destroyed by fire before they were sold. Petitions were also referred from non-profit and educational institutions, such as the Library Company of Baltimore, the Associate Reformed Church in North America, the Saint Andrews Society of Charleston, and the Pennsylvania Hospital, asking for exemptions from paying duties on books or articles imported for their use. John Redman Coxe, a professor at the University of Pennsylvania, petitioned in 1815 for a refund of duties he had been required to pay for imported materials necessary for his chemistry classes.

Requests for drawbacks, refunds authorized when imported goods on which duties had been paid were re-exported, were similarly referred to the committee during nearly every Congress. Many of the petitions were received from merchants and others who had been denied drawbacks for a variety of reasons. Merchants in Philadelphia, for example, asked for a drawback on a shipment of sugar that had been destroyed before it left the port, while other petitioners, denied drawbacks because of late filing of their requests, sought relief from Congress and gave a number of reasons for the late filing, citing outbreaks of yellow fever and the receipt of incorrect information from port officials.

The Committee on Commerce and Manufactures received petitions requesting the creation of new ports of entry and ports of delivery during nearly every Congress. Petitioners often complained that traveling great distances to the nearest port of entry was difficult, especially in bad weather. Most requests were not controversial, but there were a few cases of disagreement among petitioners. In 1800, Petersburg and Richmond, VA, submitted rival petitions for a collector's office, and in 1806 factions within Stonington, CT, submitted petitions both favoring and opposing a port of entry in that town. The committee was also involved in matters of compensation for customs house workers. Requests for increased pay and higher fees were received from weighers and measurers, collectors of customs, inspectors, and surveyors.

Petitions from a number of States requested that Congress appropriate funds to construct or maintain aids to navigation such as lighthouses, buoys, and piers. The town of New Bedford, MA, in 1800, asked that the United States purchase and maintain the lighthouse they had constructed by private subscription a few years before in order to protect the shipping in the area. The majority of petitions, however, asked for funds with which to build new lighthouses. Several towns, most in New England, wrote of the dangers to commerce and the need for lighthouses to prevent the great loss of life and property then taking place. One of the few petitions from outside New England was from the legislature of Louisiana and requested a lighthouse at the mouth of the Mississippi River.

The committee's papers consist almost exclusively of committee reports on the petitions and memorials referred to them and covered a wide variety of topics. Most of the reports begin with a restatement of the prayer of the petitioner, continue with a presentation of facts gathered by the committee, and conclude with a recommendation and suggested resolution. In general, reports concerning increased duties on books, paint and copper, salt and hats, and other products offer little explanation of the committee's recommendations. Reports responding to petitions requesting drawbacks or refunds of duties paid, however, more often explain the reasoning behind the committee's decisions. Those merchants, manufacturers, and others praying for drawbacks on damaged goods or goods shipped past the deadline for receiving drawbacks were regularly denied their requests. The specific reason given for some of the denials is that "negligence, forgetfulness, and misconception of the law" were not suitable excuses. Petitions pleading outbreaks of disease and mistakes of customs officials, on the other hand, sometimes received favorable treatment.
