= United States Senate Committee on the Tariff Regulation =

The United States Senate Select Committee on the Tariff Regulation was a Select Committee for the U.S. Senate from February 25, 1823 until March 3, 1923. It is now a defunct congressional committee, having been consolidated into the Committee of Finance in 1923.

The first U.S Congress (1789-1791) appointed 220 committees, while the U.S. Senate as of 2017 had 16 standing committees with 67 subcommittees, and five non-standing committees. The merger and combination of committee responsibilities and jurisdiction is the prime reason for the lower number of committees today.

== Origin ==
The Committee on Tariff Regulation operated under the U.S. Senate Committee on Finance. While the Select Committee on Finance had passed the Tariff Act of 1816, they did not have full jurisdiction over tariff legislation. The Finance Committee shared jurisdiction over tariffs with U.S. Senate Committee on Commerce and Manufactures. Senators on the Commerce and Manufacturers Committee tended to be more protectionist, as the U.S strove to grow its industry. And at the time the Senate steered most tariff legislation to the Commerce and Manufacturers Committee.

Senators on the Finance Committee made many attempts to get tariff legislation referred to the Finance Committee. They argued that tariffs were a means to raise revenue, and revenue was within the Finance Committee's jurisdiction. But every attempt to refer tariff bills to the Finance Committee failed, as more parochial concerns over protecting the industries of particular Senators’ states resulted in the Senate referring legislation to the Commerce and Manufacturers Committee.

As years passed, tariff issues grew larger, exposing a geographic division in the country. Southern and western interests supported reductions in tariffs. Northern interests, however, felt that tariffs were still too low and did not afford enough protection. Out of this turmoil came the creation of the select Committee on the Tariff Regulation.

== First impact ==
By 1833, disputes over tariffs reached a crisis. South Carolina threatened to nullify all tariff acts. The Senate was forced to act. And Henry Clay offered a solution in the form of a bill that would draw down tariffs over a 10-year period. Congress passed the bill, and President Jackson signed it into law.

The Committee on the Tariff Regulation had approved the bill, allowing the Senate to bypass the protectionist Commerce and Manufacturers Committee. This move away from the Commerce and Manufacturers Committee allowed the Finance Committee to begin to claim the tariff jurisdiction. By the next major tariff revision, in 1842, the Finance Committee's claim of authority over tariff legislation was complete, this would not have been possible without the Committee on the Tariff Regulation.

== Notable regulation passed by the committee ==
=== Tariff of 1833 ===
After the Force Bill was passed through Congress, Henry Clay and John C. Calhoun proposed the Tariff of 1833, also known as the Compromise Tariff, to resolve the Nullification Crisis. It was subsequently passed by the Committee on the Tariff Regulation. The Tariff of 1833 guaranteed that all tariff rates above 20% would be reduced by one tenth every two years with the final reductions back to 20% coming in 1842. This essentially forced import tariffs to gradually drop over the next decade, pleasing South Carolina and other Southern states that depended on cheap imports.

In addition, the Tariff of 1833 had some other impacts. First, it allowed many raw materials used by American industry to be admitted completely free of duty. In addition, it stated that all duties must be paid in cash, with no credit allowed the importing merchant.

Ultimately, South Carolina and the rest of the United States would accept the Tariff of 1833, and warfare between the South Carolina army and the Union was avoided. Both sides received some benefit from the deal. South Carolina now had a much more agreeable tariff and did not have to mobilize its army to protect its economy, and the United States government, through the Force Act, was given the power to use force to enforce tariffs, strengthening the central government.

Many believe that were it not for the Force Act, South Carolina may have continued its Nullification policies because the Force Act gave the United States government the ability to use military force to enforce tariffs and other economic policies, it made fighting for nullification a potentially devastating choice.

=== Tariff of 1842 ===
The Tariff of 1842, or Black Tariff as it became known, was a protectionist tariff. It reversed the effects of the Compromise Tariff of 1833. As the 20% level approached in 1842, industrial interests and members of the Whig Party began clamoring for protection by claiming that the reductions left them vulnerable to European competition.

The bill restored protection of U.S industry and raised average tariff rates to almost 40% and stipulated sweeping changes to the tariff schedule and collection system. It also replaced most ad valorem with specific duties, assessed on a good-by-good basis.

The main beneficiary industry to receive protection under the 1842 tariff was iron. Import taxes on iron goods, both raw and manufactured, amounted to almost two thirds of their price overall and exceeded 100% on many items, such as nails and hoop iron. The law also raised the percentage of dutiable goods from just over 50% of all imports to over 85% of all imports.

The impact of the 1842 tariff was felt almost immediately, with sharp decline in international trade in 1843. Imports into the United States nearly halved from their 1842 levels and exports, affected by overall trade patterns, dropped by approximately 20%.

=== Morrill Tariff of 1861 ===
The Morrill Tariff of 1861, concluded only two days before the inauguration of Abraham Lincoln, and largely defined the dimensions of American international trade policy for the next fifty years.

President James Polk began reforming tariffs in 1846 with moderate rate reductions. These reforms also standardized assessments onto a fixed ad valorem schedule in which tariffs were assessed as a percentage of the import's declared value, replacing the old discriminatory system of specific duties on specific goods enacted by the tariffs of 1842.

In 1857 there was a further uniform reduction in tariff rates. Then the Panic of 1857 saw yet another reversal of course when federal revenues declined significantly. Work began on the Morrill Tariff in 1859. In the 36th Congress no party held a majority and tariff-supporting Republicans faced off against anti-tariff Democrats in a 44-ballot stalemate over the selection of the new speaker of the House of Representatives. In early 1860 the Morrill Tariff passed in the House, not only raising tariff rates but replacing Polk's ad valorem system with the reintroduction of a specific duties-based system. With southern delegations of seceding states no longer in Congress to block the measure, the Morrill Tariff was signed into law by President James Buchanan in March 1861.

British opinion at the time favored free trade and the Morrill Tariff was detested in Britain. This development lent unexpected sympathy to Confederate efforts to secure British support early in the American Civil War, but was eventually eclipsed by the Emancipation Proclamation after which British public opinion swung behind the Union. For the northern government, the Morrill Tariff was a shortsighted strategic mistake. It unintentionally alienated an otherwise natural anti-slavery ally for what could, at best, be described as short term economic favors to a few politically connected firms and industrialists.

The Morrill Tariff was a turning point, as it began 52 years of high tariff protectionism as a national economic policy in the United States. Whereas early 19th century tariff battles saw the U.S. pivot between competing regimes of protection and relatively free trade, the Civil War inaugurated a semi-permanent political ascendance of the tariff's industrial beneficiaries in the Gilded Age. Traditional free trade constituencies in the absent and then politically weakened south, along with the agricultural west, were unable to regain the upper hand until the Woodrow Wilson administration. As a result of its settlement in 1861 and its wartime entrenchment, the tariff remained the dominant topic of American economic policy until the eve of the First World War.
