= What Do You Do with the Mad That You Feel? =

Song by Fred Rogers (Mister Rogers)

Song by Fred Rogers

from the album Let's Be Together Today
- Released: 1968
- Genre: Children's
- Length: 1:35
- Label: Small World Records
- Songwriter: Fred Rogers
- Producer: George Hill

Fred Rogers testifies before the Senate Subcommittee on Communications on 1 May 1969, and recites the lyrics to the song (beginning at around 4:50 into this video).

"What Do You Do with the Mad That You Feel?" is a song written and sung by PBS personality Fred Rogers in the PBS children's television program Mister Rogers' Neighborhood. Rogers recited the song in testimony before the United States Senate in 1969, early in the funding process of PBS, during an exchange with Senator John Pastore. Footage of the hearing was included in the 2018 documentary about Rogers, Won't You Be My Neighbor?

Rogers gave several stories for the origin of the song, but when he testified to the Senate, he said that the title and first line came from a question Rogers received from a concerned boy, who asked "What do you do with the mad that you feel when you feel so mad you could bite?"

The song first appeared on his program in 1968.
