= United States Senate Commerce Subcommittee on Aviation, Space, and Innovation =

The Senate Commerce Subcommittee on Aviation, Space, and Innovation is a subcommittee within the Senate Committee on Commerce, Science and Transportation. The Subcommittee was formerly known as the Subcommittee on Aviation, Space and Security, the Subcommittee on Aviation Operations and Safety, and Subcommittee on Aviation Safety, Operations, and Innovation.

== Jurisdiction ==
The Subcommittee on Aviation and Space has jurisdiction over technology, engineering, astronautical and aeronautical research and development; national and civil space policy; civil aviation research, development, and demonstration, and aviation safety and protection of consumers. The subcommittee conducts oversight on the National Aeronautics and Space Administration (NASA), Federal Aviation Administration (FAA), and the civil aviation and civil space policy functions of the Department of Transportation, Department of Commerce, and National Space Council within the Executive Office of the President.

== Members, 119th Congress ==
Majority	Minority
Jerry Moran, Kansas, Chair; John Thune, South Dakota; Ted Budd, North Carolina; Eric Schmitt, Missouri; Tim Sheehy, Montana; Shelley Moore Capito, West Virginia	Tammy Duckworth, Illinois, Ranking Member; Jacky Rosen, Nevada; John Hickenlooper, Colorado; John Fetterman, Pennsylvania; Andy Kim, New Jersey
Ex officio
Ted Cruz, Texas	Maria Cantwell, Washington

== Historical subcommittee rosters ==
=== 118th Congress ===
Majority	Minority
Tammy Duckworth, Illinois, Chair; Kyrsten Sinema, Arizona; Peter Welch, Vermont; Jacky Rosen, Nevada; John Hickenlooper, Colorado; Raphael Warnock, Georgia	Jerry Moran, Kansas, Ranking Member; Deb Fischer, Nebraska; Roger Wicker, Mississippi; Dan Sullivan, Alaska; Todd Young, Indiana
Ex officio
Maria Cantwell, Washington	Ted Cruz, Texas

=== 117th Congress ===
Majority	Minority
Kyrsten Sinema, Arizona, Chair; Tammy Duckworth, Illinois; Jon Tester, Montana; Jacky Rosen, Nevada; John Hickenlooper, Colorado; Raphael Warnock, Georgia	Ted Cruz, Texas, Ranking Member; John Thune, South Dakota; Roy Blunt, Missouri; Jerry Moran, Kansas; Mike Lee, Utah; Shelley Moore Capito, West Virginia
Ex officio
Maria Cantwell, Washington	Roger Wicker, Mississippi

=== 116th Congress ===
Majority	Minority
Ted Cruz, Texas, Chairman; John Thune, South Dakota; Roy Blunt, Missouri; Jerry Moran, Kansas; Cory Gardner, Colorado; Marsha Blackburn, Tennessee; Shelley Moore Capito, West Virginia; Mike Lee, Utah	Kyrsten Sinema, Arizona, Ranking Member; Brian Schatz, Hawaii; Tom Udall, New Mexico; Gary Peters, Michigan; Tammy Duckworth, Illinois; Jon Tester, Montana; Jacky Rosen, Nevada
Ex officio
Roger Wicker, Mississippi	Maria Cantwell, Washington
