= United States House Committee on Commerce =

The United States House Committee on Commerce was a standing committee of the U.S. House from 1819 until 1892; it was established when the previous Committee on Commerce and Manufactures, which has existed since 1795, was split into two different committees. The committee existed until 1891, when its name was changed to the Committee on Interstate and Foreign Commerce.

Its issues and jurisdictions have variably flowed through several iterations and currently rest within the United States House Committee on Energy and Commerce.

== History and jurisdiction ==
During this period, the committee's jurisdiction extended to "commerce, Life-Saving Service, and light-houses, other than appropriations for Life-Saving Service and light-houses." In practice, the committee's responsibilities encompassed regulation of both interstate and foreign commerce generally. With technological advances and over time, federal policy issues and regulation regarding commercial aspects under their jurisdiction also would change; these would be accompanied with many additions and some subtractions. The committee's responsibilities included its traditional customs collection districts, ports of entry, and ports of delivery, and compensation of customhouse officials. The committee exercised jurisdiction over obstructions to harbor navigation, such as sunken vessels, lighthouses and other aids, and matters relating to lifesaving stations and such federal agencies as the Lifesaving Service, Revenue Cutter Service and the Marine Hospital Service (the predecessor of the Public Health Service).

Starting in 1824, it added the dangerous obstructions of riverine navigation, such as removing sandbars and snags, dredging, lighthouses and other navigation aids; regulations and appropriations regarding navigable rivers and works affecting them, such as cribs, canals and locks, and later bridges, dams, tunnels, pipes, as well as later inter-oceanic canals and ocean cables as they arose. Commercial aspects regarding public health and the prevention of infectious diseases, the purity of food and drugs, regulations regarding the exportation of livestock and foodstuffs, and transportation of livestock also came under the committee's purview. When the House Committee on Rivers and Harbors was established on December 19, 1883, the Committee on Commerce relinquished its jurisdiction over appropriations for the improvement of rivers and harbors. But when the Interstate Commerce Act of 1887 was passed, its Interstate Commerce Commission added greatly to the committee's purview and the commercial regulation of railroads.
