= United States Senate Commerce Subcommittee on Surface Transportation, Freight, Pipelines, and Safety =

The Senate Commerce Subcommittee on Surface Transportation, Freight, Pipelines, and Safety is a subcommittee within the Senate Committee on Commerce, Science and Transportation. It was renamed from the Subcommittee on Surface Transportation, Maritime, Freight, and Ports at the beginning of the 119th United States Congress. It was known in previous Congresses as the Subcommittee on Transportation and Safety.

== Jurisdiction ==
The Subcommittee on Transportation and Safety has jurisdiction over interstate transportation policy issues. In addition to the committee's broad oversight of the Department of Transportation, the subcommittee has oversight over the Federal Motor Carrier Safety Administration, the Federal Railroad Administration, the Pipeline and Hazardous Materials Safety Administration, National Transportation Safety Board, National Highway Traffic Safety Administration, and the Surface Transportation Board. The subcommittee focuses on safety and infrastructure development related to both freight and passenger rail, including Amtrak.

== Members, 119th Congress ==
Majority	Minority
Todd Young, Indiana, Chair; John Thune, South Dakota; Roger Wicker, Mississippi; Deb Fischer, Nebraska; Dan Sullivan, Alaska; Eric Schmitt, Missouri; Bernie Moreno, Ohio; Shelley Moore Capito, West Virginia	Gary Peters, Michigan, Ranking Member; Amy Klobuchar, Minnesota; Brian Schatz, Hawaii; Ed Markey, Massachusetts; Tammy Duckworth, Illinois; Ben Ray Luján, New Mexico; Andy Kim, New Jersey
Ex officio
Ted Cruz, Texas	Maria Cantwell, Washington

== Historical subcommittee rosters ==
=== 118th Congress ===
Majority	Minority
Gary Peters, Michigan, Chair; Amy Klobuchar, Minnesota; Brian Schatz, Hawaii; Ed Markey, Massachusetts; Tammy Baldwin, Wisconsin; Tammy Duckworth, Illinois; Raphael Warnock, Georgia; Peter Welch, Vermont	Todd Young, Indiana, Ranking Member; John Thune, South Dakota; Roger Wicker, Mississippi; Deb Fischer, Nebraska; Eric Schmitt, Missouri; Shelley Moore Capito, West Virginia; Ted Budd, North Carolina
Ex officio
Maria Cantwell, Washington	Ted Cruz, Texas

=== 117th Congress ===
Majority	Minority
Gary Peters, Michigan, Chair; Amy Klobuchar, Minnesota; Richard Blumenthal, Connecticut; Brian Schatz, Hawaii; Ed Markey, Massachusetts; Tammy Baldwin, Wisconsin; Tammy Duckworth, Illinois; Jon Tester, Montana; Raphael Warnock, Georgia	Deb Fischer, Nebraska, Ranking Member; John Thune, South Dakota; Roy Blunt, Missouri; Dan Sullivan, Alaska; Todd Young, Indiana; Ron Johnson, Wisconsin; Shelley Moore Capito, West Virginia; Rick Scott, Florida; Cynthia Lummis, Wyoming
Ex officio
Maria Cantwell, Washington	Roger Wicker, Mississippi

=== 116th Congress ===
Majority	Minority
Deb Fischer, Nebraska, Chair; John Thune, South Dakota; Roy Blunt, Missouri; Jerry Moran, Kansas; Cory Gardner, Colorado; Shelley Moore Capito, West Virginia; Todd Young, Indiana; Rick Scott, Florida	Tammy Duckworth, Illinois, Ranking Member; Amy Klobuchar, Minnesota; Richard Blumenthal, Connecticut; Ed Markey, Massachusetts; Tom Udall, New Mexico; Gary Peters, Michigan; Tammy Baldwin, Wisconsin
Ex officio
Roger Wicker, Mississippi	Maria Cantwell, Washington
