= United States Senate Commerce Subcommittee on Science, Manufacturing, and Competitiveness =

The Subcommittee on Science, Manufacturing, and Competitiveness is a subcommittee within the Senate Committee on Commerce, Science and Transportation. It was renamed from the Subcommittee on Space and Science at the beginning of the 119th United States Congress. Prior to the 111th Congress it was named the Subcommittee on Space, Aeronautics, and Related Sciences.

== Jurisdiction ==
The Subcommittee's jurisdiction includes oversight of NASA, the National Science Foundation, the National Institute of Standards and Technology, and the Office of Science and Technology Policy. For the 111th Congress, the Subcommittee gained additional jurisdiction on science matters from the former United States Senate Commerce Subcommittee on Science, Technology, and Innovation.

== Members, 119th Congress ==
Majority	Minority
Ted Budd, North Carolina, Chair; Marsha Blackburn, Tennessee; Todd Young, Indiana; Eric Schmitt, Missouri; Bernie Moreno, Ohio; Cynthia Lummis, Wyoming	Tammy Baldwin, Wisconsin, Ranking Member; Gary Peters, Michigan; Jacky Rosen, Nevada; John Hickenlooper, Colorado; Lisa Blunt Rochester, Delaware
Ex officio
Ted Cruz, Texas	Maria Cantwell, Washington

== Historical subcommittee rosters ==
=== 118th Congress ===
Majority	Minority
Kyrsten Sinema, Arizona, Chair; Ed Markey, Massachusetts; Gary Peters, Michigan; Ben Ray Luján, New Mexico; Raphael Warnock, Georgia	Eric Schmitt, Missouri, Ranking Member; Deb Fischer, Nebraska; Cynthia Lummis, Wyoming
Ex officio
Maria Cantwell, Washington	Ted Cruz, Texas

=== 117th Congress ===
Majority	Minority
John Hickenlooper, Colorado, Chair; Richard Blumenthal, Connecticut; Ed Markey, Massachusetts; Gary Peters, Michigan; Kyrsten Sinema, Arizona; Ben Ray Luján, New Mexico; Raphael Warnock, Georgia	Cynthia Lummis, Wyoming, Ranking Member; Ted Cruz, Texas; Deb Fischer, Nebraska; Jerry Moran, Kansas; Todd Young, Indiana; Mike Lee, Utah; Rick Scott, Florida
Ex officio
Maria Cantwell, Washington	Roger Wicker, Mississippi

=== 115th Congress ===
Majority	Minority
Ted Cruz, Texas, Chairman; Jerry Moran, Kansas; Dan Sullivan, Alaska; Mike Lee, Utah; Ron Johnson, Wisconsin; Shelley Moore Capito, West Virginia; Cory Gardner, Colorado	Ed Markey, Massachusetts, Ranking Member; Brian Schatz, Hawaii; Tom Udall, New Mexico; Gary Peters, Michigan; Tammy Baldwin, Wisconsin; Maggie Hassan, New Hampshire
Ex officio
John Thune, South Dakota	Bill Nelson, Florida

== See also ==
- United States House Science Subcommittee on Space
