= United States Senate Commerce Subcommittee on Consumer Protection, Technology, and Data Privacy =

The Subcommittee on Consumer Protection, Technology, and Data Privacy is a subcommittee within the United States Senate Committee on Commerce, Science, and Transportation. It was formerly named the Subcommittee on Manufacturing, Trade, and Consumer Protection, the Subcommittee on Consumer Affairs, Insurance, and Automotive Safety, the Subcommittee on Consumer Protection, Product Safety, Insurance and Data Security, and the Subcommittee on Consumer Protection, Product Safety, and Data Security before getting its current title at the beginning of the 119th United States Congress.

== Jurisdiction ==
The Subcommittee on Consumer Protection, Product Safety, and Data Security is responsible for consumer affairs, consumer protection, and consumer product safety; product liability; property and casualty insurance; manufacturing and workforce development; sports-related matters; and data privacy, security, and protection. The subcommittee also conducts oversight on the Federal Trade Commission (FTC) and Consumer Product Safety Commission (CPSC), as well as manufacturing and trade related matters within the Department of Commerce.

== Members, 119th Congress ==
Majority	Minority
Marsha Blackburn, Tennessee, Chair; John Thune, South Dakota; Deb Fischer, Nebraska; Jerry Moran, Kansas; Todd Young, Indiana; John Curtis, Utah; Shelley Moore Capito, West Virginia	John Hickenlooper, Colorado, Ranking Member; Amy Klobuchar, Minnesota; Brian Schatz, Hawaii; Ed Markey, Massachusetts; Tammy Baldwin, Wisconsin; Ben Ray Luján, New Mexico; Lisa Blunt Rochester, Delaware
Ex officio
Ted Cruz, Texas	Maria Cantwell, Washington

== Historical subcommittee rosters ==
=== 118th Congress ===
Majority	Minority
John Hickenlooper, Colorado, Chair; Amy Klobuchar, Minnesota; Brian Schatz, Hawaii; Ed Markey, Massachusetts; Tammy Baldwin, Wisconsin; Ben Ray Luján, New Mexico; Tammy Duckworth, Illinois; Peter Welch, Vermont	Marsha Blackburn, Tennessee, Ranking Member; Deb Fischer, Nebraska; Cynthia Lummis, Wyoming; Dan Sullivan, Alaska; Jerry Moran, Kansas; Ted Budd, North Carolina; Todd Young, Indiana
Ex officio
Maria Cantwell, Washington	Ted Cruz, Texas

=== 117th Congress ===
Majority	Minority
Richard Blumenthal, Connecticut, Chair; Amy Klobuchar, Minnesota; Brian Schatz, Hawaii; Ed Markey, Massachusetts; Tammy Baldwin, Wisconsin; Ben Ray Luján, New Mexico	Marsha Blackburn, Tennessee, Ranking Member; John Thune, South Dakota; Roy Blunt, Missouri; Jerry Moran, Kansas; Mike Lee, Utah; Todd Young, Indiana
Ex officio
Maria Cantwell, Washington	Roger Wicker, Mississippi

=== 116th Congress ===
Majority	Minority
Jerry Moran, Kansas, Chair; John Thune, South Dakota; Deb Fischer, Nebraska; Dan Sullivan, Alaska; Marsha Blackburn, Tennessee; Shelley Moore Capito, West Virginia; Mike Lee, Utah; Ron Johnson, Wisconsin; Todd Young, Indiana	Richard Blumenthal, Connecticut, Ranking Member; Amy Klobuchar, Minnesota; Brian Schatz, Hawaii; Ed Markey, Massachusetts; Tom Udall, New Mexico; Tammy Baldwin, Wisconsin; Kyrsten Sinema, Arizona; Jacky Rosen, Nevada
Ex officio
Roger Wicker, Mississippi	Maria Cantwell, Washington

== Notable activities ==
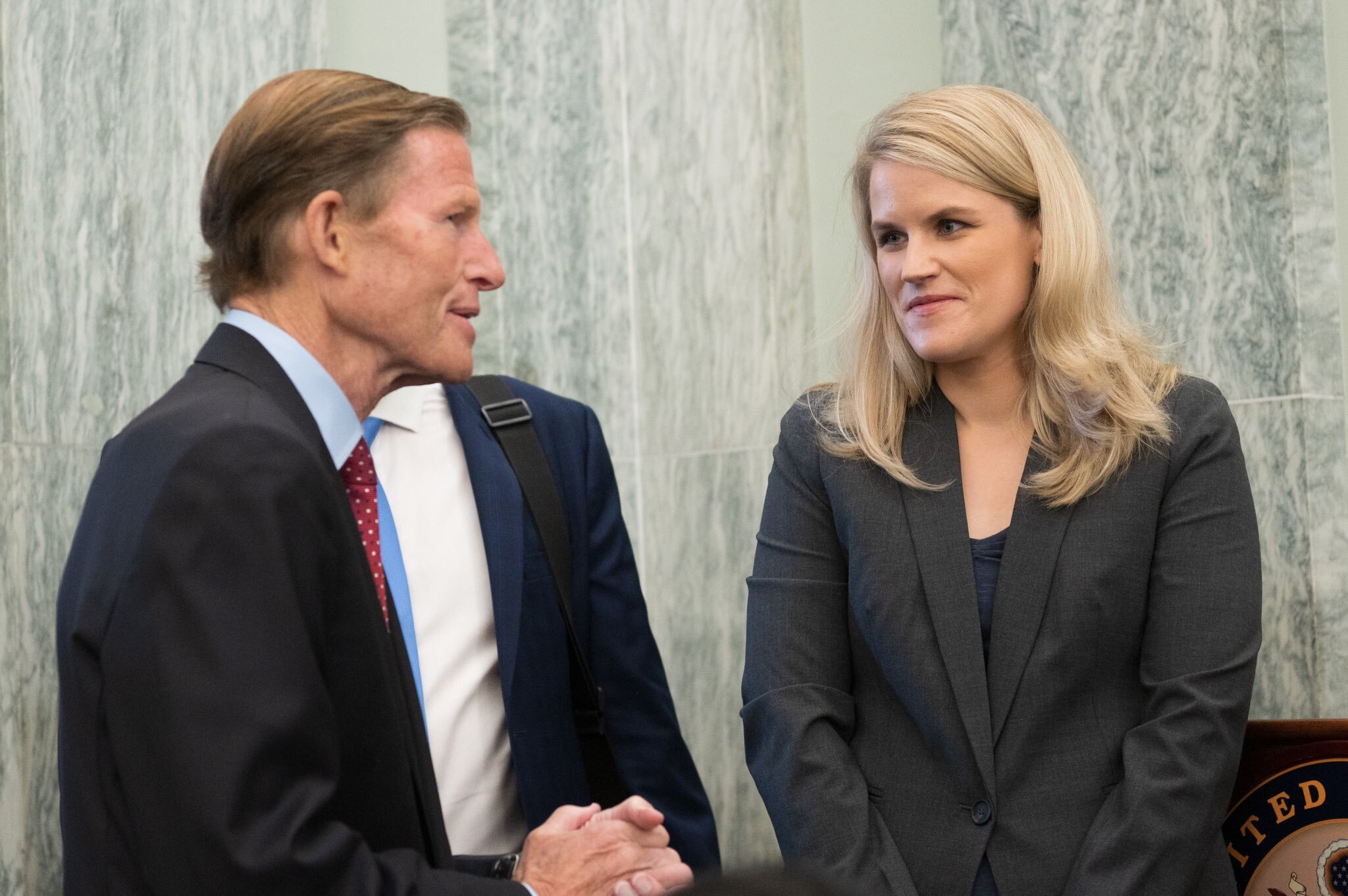
Facebook whistleblower Frances Haugen with then-subcommittee chair Richard Blumenthal on October 5, 2021

=== 2021 Facebook whistleblower hearing ===
Following the 2021 Facebook leak controversy, the subcommittee under then-chairman Richard Blumenthal (D-CT) held a hearing titled "Protecting Kids Online: Testimony from a Facebook Whistleblower". Held on October 5, 2021, the hearing featured testimony from Frances Haugen, a former Facebook product manager who disclosed tens of thousands of internal documents to the Securities and Exchange Commission (SEC) and The Wall Street Journal.

During the hearing, Haugen testified that the social media platform has harmed young users' mental health and facilitated the spread of dangerous misinformation. Haugen's testimony was praised by a bipartisan group of Senators, including Blumenthal and Marsha Blackburn, a Republican from Tennessee.
