= United States Senate Commerce Subcommittee on Coast Guard, Maritime, and Fisheries =

The Subcommittee on Coast Guard, Maritime, and Fisheries is a subcommittee within the Senate Committee on Commerce, Science and Transportation. It was formerly the Subcommittee on Oceans, Fisheries, Climate Change and Manufacturing before being renamed at the beginning of the 119th United States Congress. Prior to the 117th Congress, it was the Subcommittee on Science, Oceans, Fisheries, and Weather. Prior to the 116th Congress, it was formerly the Subcommittee on Oceans, Atmosphere, Fisheries, and Coast Guard.

== Jurisdiction ==
The Subcommittee on Oceans, Fisheries, Climate Change and Manufacturing has jurisdiction over coastal zone management; ocean, weather, and atmospheric activities; marine fisheries; and marine mammals. The subcommittee also conducts oversight on the National Oceanic and Atmospheric Administration (NOAA), U.S. Coast Guard, the Marine Mammal Commission (MMC), U.S. Global Change Research Program, and Minority Business Development Agency, as well as the Department of Commerce manufacturing bureaus and workforce development matters.

== Members, 119th Congress ==
Majority	Minority
Dan Sullivan, Alaska, Chair; Roger Wicker, Mississippi; John Curtis, Utah; Bernie Moreno, Ohio; Tim Sheehy, Montana	Lisa Blunt Rochester, Delaware, Ranking Member; Brian Schatz, Hawaii; Gary Peters, Michigan; Tammy Baldwin, Wisconsin
Ex officio
Ted Cruz, Texas	Maria Cantwell, Washington

== Historical subcommittee rosters ==
=== 118th Congress ===
Majority	Minority
Tammy Baldwin, Wisconsin, Chair; Brian Schatz, Hawaii; Ed Markey, Massachusetts; Ben Ray Luján, New Mexico; Raphael Warnock, Georgia; Peter Welch, Vermont	Dan Sullivan, Alaska, Ranking Member; Roger Wicker, Mississippi; Jerry Moran, Kansas; Marsha Blackburn, Tennessee; JD Vance, Ohio
Ex officio
Maria Cantwell, Washington	Ted Cruz, Texas

=== 117th Congress ===
Majority	Minority
Tammy Baldwin, Wisconsin, Chair; Richard Blumenthal, Connecticut; Brian Schatz, Hawaii; Ed Markey, Massachusetts; Gary Peters, Michigan; Ben Ray Luján, New Mexico	Dan Sullivan, Alaska, Ranking Member; Ted Cruz, Texas; Deb Fischer, Nebraska; Marsha Blackburn, Tennessee; Ron Johnson, Wisconsin; Todd Young, Indiana
Ex officio
Maria Cantwell, Washington	Roger Wicker, Mississippi

=== 116th Congress ===
Majority	Minority
Cory Gardner, Colorado, Chair; Ted Cruz, Texas; Dan Sullivan, Alaska; Ron Johnson, Wisconsin; Rick Scott, Florida	Tammy Baldwin, Wisconsin, Ranking Member; Richard Blumenthal, Connecticut; Brian Schatz, Hawaii; Gary Peters, Michigan
Ex officio
Roger Wicker, Mississippi	Maria Cantwell, Washington
