= United States Senate Committee on Commerce and Manufactures =

The United States Senate Committee on Commerce and Manufactures was one of the original standing committees created in the Senate in 1816, but it only lasted nine years, when it was split into the Committee on Commerce and the Committee on Manufactures. It functions are now under the jurisdiction of the United States Senate Committee on Commerce, Science and Transportation.

== History and activities ==
The Committee on Commerce and Manufactures was established as one of the original standing committees, following adoption of a resolution proposed by James Barbour of Virginia on December 10, 1816. The committee's records consist of petitions and memorials referred to the committee for the whole period and committee reports and papers from 1818.

With its brief existence, the records show substantial committee activity, especially regarding petitions received. In all Congresses the principle record subjects are tariffs and the regulation of shipping and revenue collection. Other subjects included the welfare of sick and disabled seamen between the 15th and 17th Congress, and harbor improvements such as lighthouses between the 16th and 18th Congress. The single most prominent subject was tariffs, particularly the protectionist Tariff of 1824 in the 18th Congress. From its beginning, the committee received petitions and memorials from various individuals or groups seeking protection for their particular industry, as well as a few from agricultural interests, such as those from various agricultural societies of Virginia, seeking less tariff protection (17th). Many memorials requesting higher duties on imported iron and products manufactured from iron were received, mainly from citizens of Pennsylvania and New Jersey, during the debate of the 1824 tariff. Prominent textile manufacturer Samuel Slater and other Rhode Island citizens also memorialized the Senate about the 1824 tariff. Other activities relating to shipping and revenue collection include registration of vessels, establishment of new collection districts and ports of entry, and collection of duties on sales at auction.

The Tariff of 1824 was a pivotal issue for the committee's established existence. In December 1825, the chairman, Mahlon Dickerson of New Jersey, proposed that the committee be split into separate committees—one for commerce and one for manufactures. Dickerson, a protectionist, believed that it was "improper to blend two subjects so distinct from each other as Commerce and Manufactures" and he was supported in his proposal by fellow Senator James Lloyd of Massachusetts, a free trader, who thought that low tariff advocates on the existing committee were a distinct minority. On the other hand, Robert Y. Hayne of South Carolina argued that such a division reflected narrow, sectional interests, and alternatively proposed that agriculture be added to give a single committee oversight of the Nation's economic interests. Dickerson's motion was adopted and the committee was split.

== Chairmen ==
- William Hunter (F-RI) 1816-1817
- Nathan Sanford (DR-NY) 1817-1820
- Mahlon Dickerson (DR-NJ) 1820-1825
