= United States Senate Committee on Commerce, Science, and Transportation =

Standing committee of the United States Senate

Senate Commerce Committee
Standing committee
- Active United States Senate; 119th Congress

History
- Formed: February 4, 1977

Leadership
- Chair: Ted Cruz (R); Since January 3, 2025
- Ranking Member: Maria Cantwell (D); Since January 3, 2025

Structure
- Political parties: Majority (15): Republican (15); Minority (13): Democratic (13)

Jurisdiction
- Policy areas: Aviation, Coast Guard, Coastal zone management, Common carriers, Communications, Competitiveness, Consumer protection, Highways and highway safety, Inland waterways, Internet, Navigation, Interstate commerce, Marine conservation, Marine fisheries, Merchant Marine, Oceanography, Outer Continental Shelf lands, Panama Canal, Product safety and liability, Rail, Science policy of the United States, Sport, Standards of weights and measures, Tourism, Transportation generally, Weather and climate change
- Oversight authority: Coast Guard, CPSC, CPB, Department of Commerce, Department of Transportation, FAA, FCC, FMC, FMCSA, FRA, FTC, MARAD, NASA, NHTSA, NIST, NOAA, NSF, NTIA, NTSB, OSTP, PHMSA, STB, TSA
- House counterpart: Committee on Energy and Commerce (Commerce (Note: The "Energy" portion of the committee is a counterpart to the Senate Energy & Natural Resources Committee.)); Committee on Science, Space, and Technology; Committee on Transportation and Infrastructure

Subcommittees
- Aviation Safety, Operations, and Innovation; Communications, Media, and Broadband; Consumer Protection, Product Safety, and Data Security; Oceans, Fisheries, Climate Change and Manufacturing; Space and Science; Surface Transportation, Maritime, Freight, and Ports; Tourism, Trade, and Export Promotion

Meeting place
- 512 Dirksen Senate Building

Website
- https://www.commerce.senate.gov/

Rules
- Rule XXV.1.(f), Standing Rules of the Senate; Rules of the Committee on Commerce, Science, and Transportation

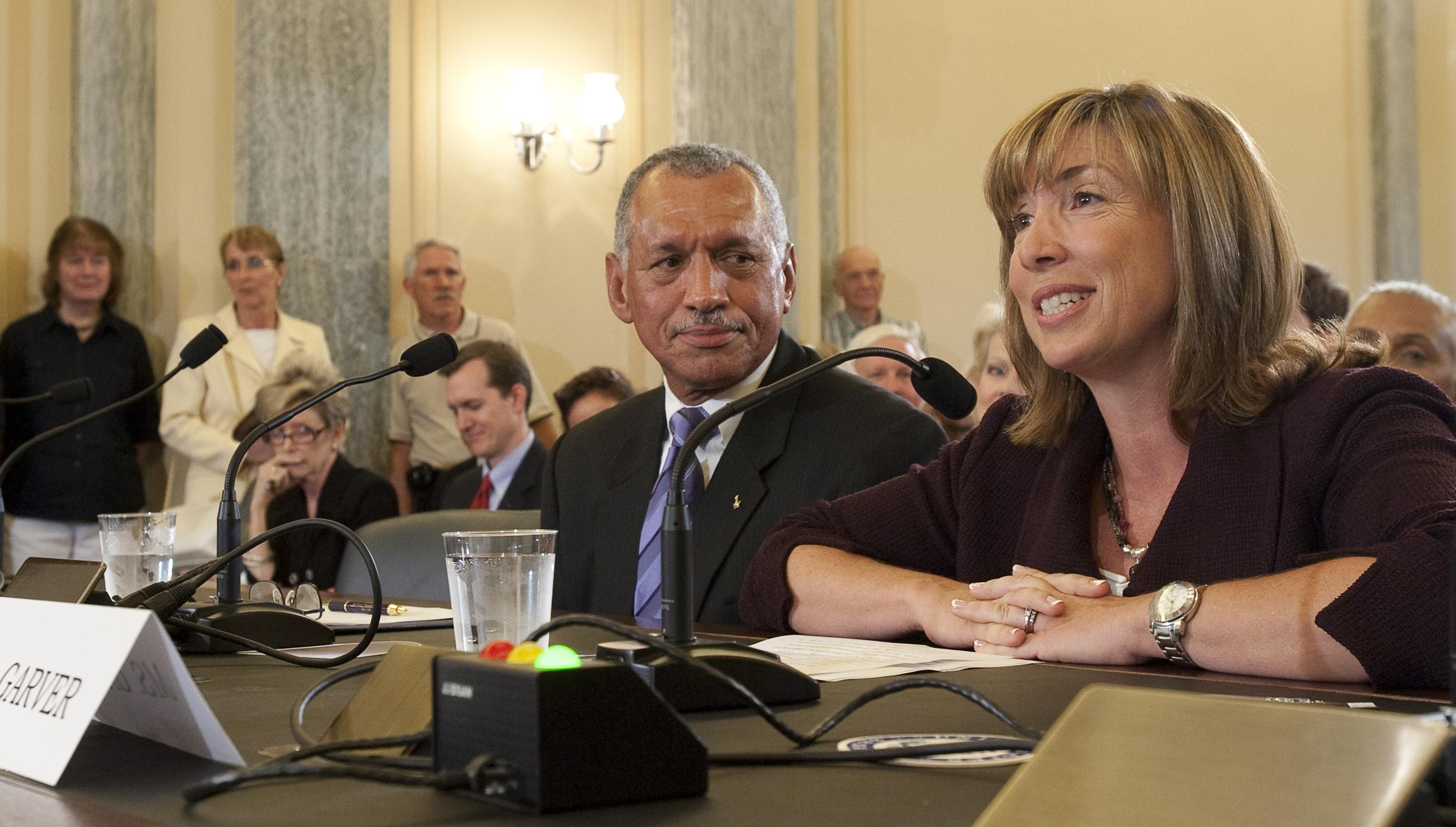
Charles Bolden, nominee for Administrator of NASA, center, and Lori Garver, right, nominee for deputy administrator of NASA, testify at their confirmation hearing before the Committee in 2009

The United States Senate Committee on Commerce, Science, and Transportation is a standing committee of the United States Senate. Besides having broad jurisdiction over all matters concerning interstate commerce, science and technology policy, and transportation, the Senate Commerce Committee is one of the largest of the Senate's standing committees, with 28 members in the 117th Congress. The Commerce Committee has six subcommittees. It is chaired by Sen. Ted Cruz (R-TX) with Sen. Maria Cantwell (D-WA) as ranking member. The majority office is housed in the Dirksen Senate Office Building, and the minority office is located in the Hart Senate Office Building.

== History ==
The committee has its roots in the Committee on Commerce and Manufacturers, which served as a standing committee in the early-1800s. This committee was split in two in the 1820s and remained in this configuration until the Legislative Reorganization Act of 1946. Under the LRA, the number of standing committees was dramatically decreased to increase congressional efficiency and increase institutional strength. As a result, the Committee on Commerce, the Committee on Manufactures, the Committee on Interstate Commerce, and the Committee on Interoceanic Canals were combined into the United States Senate Committee on Interstate and Foreign Commerce. In 1977, as a part of widespread committee reorganization, the committee was renamed the Committee on Commerce, Science, and Transportation and given additional oversight jurisdiction over nonmilitary aeronautical and space sciences, including the National Aeronautics and Space Administration (NASA).

The original progenitors of this committee were:

- United States Senate Committee on Commerce and Manufactures (1816–1825)
- United States Senate Committee on Commerce (1825–1946, 1961–1977)
- United States Senate Committee on Manufactures (1825–1855, 1864–1946)
- United States Senate Committee on Interstate Commerce (1885–1946)
- United States Senate Committee on Interoceanic Canals (1899–1946)
- United States Senate Committee on Interstate and Foreign Commerce (1946–1961)
- United States Senate Committee on Aeronautical and Space Sciences (1958–1977)

== Jurisdiction ==
In accordance of Rule XXV of the United States Senate, all proposed legislation, messages, petitions, memorials, and other matters relating to the following subjects is referred to the Senate Committee on Commerce, Science, and Transportation:

1. "Coast Guard;
2. Coastal zone management;
3. Communications;
4. Highway safety;
5. Inland waterways, except construction;
6. Interstate commerce;
7. Marine and ocean navigation, safety, and transportation, including navigational aspects of deepwater ports;
8. Marine fisheries;
9. Merchant marine and navigation;
10. Nonmilitary aeronautical and space sciences;
11. Oceans, weather, and atmospheric activities;
12. Panama Canal and interoceanic canals generally, except as provided in subparagraph (c);
13. Regulation of consumer products and services, including testing related to toxic substances, other than pesticides, and except for credit, financial services, and housing;
14. Regulation of interstate common carriers, including railroads, buses, trucks, vessels, pipelines, and civil aviation;
15. Science, engineering, and technology research and development and policy;
16. Sports;
17. Standards and measurement;
18. Transportation; and,
19. Transportation and commerce aspects of Outer Continental Shelf lands."

The Senate Commerce Committee is also charged to "study and review, on a comprehensive basis, all matters relating to science and technology, oceans policy, transportation, communications, and consumer affairs, and report thereon from time to time."

== Members, 119th Congress ==
| Majority | Minority |
|---|---|
| Ted Cruz, Texas, Chair; John Thune, South Dakota; Roger Wicker, Mississippi; Deb Fischer, Nebraska; Jerry Moran, Kansas; Dan Sullivan, Alaska; Marsha Blackburn, Tennessee; Todd Young, Indiana; Ted Budd, North Carolina; Eric Schmitt, Missouri; John Curtis, Utah; Bernie Moreno, Ohio; Tim Sheehy, Montana; Shelley Moore Capito, West Virginia; Cynthia Lummis, Wyoming | Maria Cantwell, Washington, Ranking Member; Amy Klobuchar, Minnesota; Brian Schatz, Hawaii; Ed Markey, Massachusetts; Gary Peters, Michigan; Tammy Baldwin, Wisconsin; Tammy Duckworth, Illinois; Jacky Rosen, Nevada; Ben Ray Luján, New Mexico; John Hickenlooper, Colorado; John Fetterman, Pennsylvania; Andy Kim, New Jersey; Lisa Blunt Rochester, Delaware |

== Subcommittees ==
| Subcommittee | Chair | Ranking Member |
|---|---|---|
| Aviation, Space, and Innovation | Jerry Moran (R-KS) | Tammy Duckworth (D-IL) |
| Telecommunications and Media | Deb Fischer (R-NE) | Ben Ray Luján (D-NM) |
| Consumer Protection, Technology, and Data Privacy | Marsha Blackburn (R-TN) | John Hickenlooper (D-CO) |
| Coast Guard, Maritime, and Fisheries | Dan Sullivan (R-AK) | Lisa Blunt Rochester (D-DE) |
| Science, Manufacturing, and Competitiveness | Ted Budd (R-NC) | Tammy Baldwin (D-WI) |
| Surface Transportation, Freight, Pipelines, and Safety | Todd Young (R-IN) | Gary Peters (D-MI) |

== Chairs ==
The committee, under its various names, has had the below chairs.

=== Committee on Commerce and Manufactures, 1816–1825 ===
| Name | Party | State | Start | End |
|---|---|---|---|---|
| William Hunter | Federalist | Rhode Island | 1816 | 1817 |
| Nathan Sanford | Democratic-Republican | New York | 1817 | 1820 |
| Mahlon Dickerson | Democratic-Republican (1820–1824) | New Jersey | 1820 | 1825 |
| Mahlon Dickerson | Crawford Democratic-Republican (1824–1825) | New Jersey | 1820 | 1825 |

=== Committee on Commerce, 1825–1947 ===
| Name | Party | State | Start | End |
|---|---|---|---|---|
| James Lloyd | Adams-Clay Republican (1825) | Massachusetts | 1825 | 1826 |
| James Lloyd | Adams Republican (1825–1826) | Massachusetts | 1825 | 1826 |
| Josiah Johnston | Adams Republican | Louisiana | 1826 | 1827 |
| Levi Woodbury | Jacksonian | New Hampshire | 1827 | 1831 |
| John Forsyth | Jacksonian | Georgia | 1831 | 1832 |
| William King | Jacksonian | Alabama | 1832 | 1833 |
| Nathaniel Silsbee | Anti-Jackson | Massachusetts | 1833 | 1835 |
| John Davis | Anti-Jackson | Massachusetts | 1835 | 1836 |
| William King | Jacksonian (1836–1837) | Alabama | 1836 | 1841 |
| William King | Democratic (1837–1841) | Alabama | 1836 | 1841 |
| Jabez Huntington | Whig | Connecticut | 1841 | 1845 |
| William Haywood | Democratic | North Carolina | 1845 | 1846 |
| John Dix | Democratic | New York | 1846 | 1849 |
| Hannibal Hamlin | Democratic | Maine | 1849 | 1856 |
| Henry Dodge | Democratic | Wisconsin | 1856 | 1857 |
| Clement Clay | Democratic | Alabama | 1857 | 1861 |
| William Bigler | Democratic | Pennsylvania | 1861 | |
| Zachariah Chandler | Republican | Michigan | 1861 | 1875 |
| Roscoe Conkling | Republican | New York | 1875 | 1879 |
| John Gordon | Democratic | Georgia | 1879 | 1880 |
| Matt Ransom | Democratic | North Carolina | 1880 | 1881 |
| Roscoe Conkling | Republican | New York | 1881 | |
| Samuel McMillan | Republican | Minnesota | 1881 | 1887 |
| William Frye | Republican | Maine | 1887 | 1893 |
| Matt Ransom | Democratic | North Carolina | 1893 | 1895 |
| William Frye | Republican | Maine | 1895 | 1911 |
| Knute Nelson | Republican | Minnesota | 1911 | 1913 |
| James Clarke | Democratic | Arkansas | 1913 | 1916 |
| Duncan Fletcher | Democratic | Florida | 1916 | 1919 |
| Wesley Jones | Republican | Washington | 1919 | 1930 |
| Hiram Johnson | Republican | California | 1930 | 1933 |
| Hubert Stephens | Democratic | Mississippi | 1933 | 1935 |
| Royal Copeland | Democratic | New York | 1935 | 1939 |
| Josiah Bailey | Democratic | North Carolina | 1939 | 1946 |

=== Committee on Interstate and Foreign Commerce, 1947–1961 ===
| Name | Party | State | Start | End |
|---|---|---|---|---|
| Wallace White | Republican | Maine | 1947 | 1949 |
| Edwin Johnson | Democratic | Colorado | 1949 | 1953 |
| Charles Tobey | Republican | New Hampshire | 1953 | |
| John Bricker | Republican | Ohio | 1953 | 1955 |
| Warren Magnuson | Democratic | Washington | 1955 | 1961 |

=== Committee on Aeronautical and Space Sciences, 1958–1977 ===
| Name | Party | State | Start | End |
|---|---|---|---|---|
| Lyndon Johnson | Democratic | Texas | 1958 | 1961 |
| Robert Kerr | Democratic | Oklahoma | 1961 | 1963 |
| Clinton Anderson | Democratic | New Mexico | 1963 | 1973 |
| Frank Moss | Democratic | Utah | 1973 | 1977 |
| Wendell Ford | Democratic | Kentucky | 1977 | |

=== Committee on Commerce, 1961–1977 ===
| Name | Party | State | Start | End |
|---|---|---|---|---|
| Warren Magnuson | Democratic | Washington | 1961 | 1977 |

=== Committee on Commerce, Science, and Transportation, 1977–present ===
| Name | Party | State | Start | End |
|---|---|---|---|---|
| Warren Magnuson | Democratic | Washington | 1977 | 1978 |
| Howard Cannon | Democratic | Nevada | 1978 | 1981 |
| Bob Packwood | Republican | Oregon | 1981 | 1985 |
| John Danforth | Republican | Missouri | 1985 | 1987 |
| Fritz Hollings | Democratic | South Carolina | 1987 | 1995 |
| Larry Pressler | Republican | South Dakota | 1995 | 1997 |
| John McCain | Republican | Arizona | 1997 | 2001 |
| Fritz Hollings | Democratic | South Carolina | 2001 (Note: At the beginning of the 107th Congress in January 2001 the Senate was evenly divided. With a Democratic president and vice president still serving until January 20, the Democratic vice president was available to break a tie, and the Democrats thus controlled the Senate for 17 days, from January 3 to January 20. On January 3 the Senate adopted S. Res. 7 designating Democratic senators as committee chairs to serve during this period and Republican chairs to serve effective at noon on January 20, 2001.) | |
| John McCain | Republican | Arizona | 2001 | |
| Fritz Hollings | Democratic | South Carolina | 2001 | 2003 (Note: On June 6, 2001, the Democrats took control of the Senate after Senator James Jeffords (VT) changed from the Republican Party to Independent and announced that he would caucus with the Democrats.) |
| John McCain | Republican | Arizona | 2003 | 2005 |
| Ted Stevens | Republican | Alaska | 2005 | 2007 |
| Daniel Inouye | Democratic | Hawaii | 2007 | 2009 |
| Jay Rockefeller | Democratic | West Virginia | 2009 | 2015 |
| John Thune | Republican | South Dakota | 2015 | 2019 |
| Roger Wicker | Republican | Mississippi | 2019 | 2021 |
| Maria Cantwell | Democratic | Washington | 2021 | 2025 |
| Ted Cruz | Republican | Texas | 2025 | present |

=== Ranking members ===
| Name | Party | State | Start | End |
|---|---|---|---|---|
| Wallace White | Republican | Maine | ??? | 1947 |
| Edwin Johnson | Democratic | Colorado | 1947 | 1949 |
| Charles Tobey | Republican | New Hampshire | 1949 | 1953 |
| Edwin Johnson | Democratic | Colorado | 1953 | 1955 |
| John Bricker | Republican | Ohio | 1955 | 1959 |
| Andrew Schoeppel | Republican | Kansas | 1959 | 1962 |
| John Butler | Republican | Maryland | 1962 | 1963 |
| Norris Cotton | Republican | New Hampshire | 1963 | 1975 |
| James Pearson | Republican | Kansas | 1975 | 1979 |
| Bob Packwood | Republican | Oregon | 1979 | 1981 |
| Howard Cannon | Democratic | Nevada | 1981 | 1983 |
| Fritz Hollings | Democratic | South Carolina | 1983 | 1987 |
| John Danforth | Republican | Missouri | 1987 | 1995 |
| Fritz Hollings | Democratic | South Carolina | 1995 | 2001 |
| John McCain | Republican | Arizona | 2001 | 2003 |
| Fritz Hollings | Democratic | South Carolina | 2003 | 2005 |
| Daniel Inouye | Democratic | Hawaii | 2005 | 2007 |
| Ted Stevens | Republican | Alaska | 2007 | 2008 |
| Kay Hutchison | Republican | Texas | 2008 | 2013 |
| John Thune | Republican | South Dakota | 2013 | 2015 |
| Bill Nelson | Democratic | Florida | 2015 | 2019 |
| Maria Cantwell | Democratic | Washington | 2019 | 2021 |
| Roger Wicker | Republican | Mississippi | 2021 | 2023 |
| Ted Cruz | Republican | Texas | 2023 | 2025 |
| Maria Cantwell | Democratic | Washington | 2025 | present |

== Historical committee rosters ==
=== 118th Congress ===
| Majority | Minority |
|---|---|
| Maria Cantwell, Washington, Chair; Amy Klobuchar, Minnesota; Brian Schatz, Hawaii; Ed Markey, Massachusetts; Gary Peters, Michigan; Tammy Baldwin, Wisconsin; Tammy Duckworth, Illinois; Jon Tester, Montana; Kyrsten Sinema, Arizona (Note: Kyrsten Sinema is formally an independent but caucuses with the Democrats.); Jacky Rosen, Nevada; Ben Ray Luján, New Mexico; John Hickenlooper, Colorado; Raphael Warnock, Georgia; Peter Welch, Vermont | Ted Cruz, Texas, Ranking Member; John Thune, South Dakota; Roger Wicker, Mississippi; Deb Fischer, Nebraska; Jerry Moran, Kansas; Dan Sullivan, Alaska; Marsha Blackburn, Tennessee; Todd Young, Indiana; Rick Scott, Florida (until February 2, 2023); Ted Budd, North Carolina; Eric Schmitt, Missouri; JD Vance, Ohio; Shelley Moore Capito, West Virginia; Cynthia Lummis, Wyoming |

Subcommittees

| Subcommittee | Chair | Ranking Member |
|---|---|---|
| Aviation Safety, Operations and Innovation | Tammy Duckworth (D-IL) | Jerry Moran (R-KS) |
| Communications, Media and Broadband | Ben Ray Luján (D-NM) | John Thune (R-SD) |
| Consumer Protection, Product Safety and Data Security | John Hickenlooper (D-CO) | Marsha Blackburn (R-TN) |
| Oceans, Fisheries, Climate Change and Manufacturing | Tammy Baldwin (D-WI) | Dan Sullivan (R-AK) |
| Space and Science | Kyrsten Sinema (I-AZ) | Eric Schmitt (R-MO) |
| Surface Transportation, Maritime, Freight and Ports | Gary Peters (D-MI) | Todd Young (R-IN) |
| Tourism, Trade, and Export Promotion | Jacky Rosen (D-NV) | Ted Budd (R-NC) |

=== 117th Congress ===
| Majority | Minority |
|---|---|
| Maria Cantwell, Washington, Chair; Amy Klobuchar, Minnesota; Richard Blumenthal, Connecticut; Brian Schatz, Hawaii; Ed Markey, Massachusetts; Gary Peters, Michigan; Tammy Baldwin, Wisconsin; Tammy Duckworth, Illinois; Jon Tester, Montana; Kyrsten Sinema, Arizona; Jacky Rosen, Nevada; Ben Ray Luján, New Mexico; John Hickenlooper, Colorado; Raphael Warnock, Georgia | Roger Wicker, Mississippi, Ranking Member; John Thune, South Dakota; Roy Blunt, Missouri; Ted Cruz, Texas; Deb Fischer, Nebraska; Jerry Moran, Kansas; Dan Sullivan, Alaska; Marsha Blackburn, Tennessee; Mike Lee, Utah; Ron Johnson, Wisconsin; Shelley Moore Capito, West Virginia; Todd Young, Indiana; Rick Scott, Florida; Cynthia Lummis, Wyoming |

Subcommittees

| Subcommittee | Chair | Ranking Member |
|---|---|---|
| Aviation Safety, Operations and Innovation | Kyrsten Sinema (D-AZ) | Ted Cruz (R-TX) |
| Communications, Media and Broadband | Ben Ray Luján (D-NM) | John Thune (R-SD) |
| Consumer Protection, Product Safety and Data Security | Richard Blumenthal (D-CT) | Marsha Blackburn (R-TN) |
| Oceans, Fisheries, Climate Change and Manufacturing | Tammy Baldwin (D-WI) | Dan Sullivan (R-AK) |
| Space and Science | John Hickenlooper (D-CO) | Cynthia Lummis (R-WY) |
| Surface Transportation, Maritime, Freight and Ports | Gary Peters (D-MI) | Deb Fischer (R-NE) |
| Tourism, Trade, and Export Promotion | Jacky Rosen (D-NV) | Rick Scott (R-FL) |

=== 116th Congress ===
| Majority | Minority |
|---|---|
| Roger Wicker, Mississippi, Chair; John Thune, South Dakota; Roy Blunt, Missouri; Ted Cruz, Texas; Deb Fischer, Nebraska; Jerry Moran, Kansas; Dan Sullivan, Alaska; Mike Lee, Utah; Ron Johnson, Wisconsin; Shelley Moore Capito, West Virginia; Cory Gardner, Colorado; Todd Young, Indiana; Rick Scott, Florida; Marsha Blackburn, Tennessee | Maria Cantwell, Washington, Ranking Member; Amy Klobuchar, Minnesota; Richard Blumenthal, Connecticut; Brian Schatz, Hawaii; Ed Markey, Massachusetts; Tom Udall, New Mexico; Gary Peters, Michigan; Tammy Baldwin, Wisconsin; Tammy Duckworth, Illinois; Jon Tester, Montana; Kyrsten Sinema, Arizona; Jacky Rosen, Nevada |

Subcommittees

| Subcommittee | Chair | Ranking Member |
|---|---|---|
| Aviation and Space | Ted Cruz (R-TX) | Kyrsten Sinema (D-AZ) |
| Communications, Technology, Innovation and the Internet | John Thune (R-SD) | Brian Schatz (D-HI) |
| Manufacturing, Trade, and Consumer Protection | Jerry Moran (R-KS) | Richard Blumenthal (D-CT) |
| Science, Oceans, Fisheries, and Weather | Cory Gardner (R-CO) | Tammy Baldwin (D-WI) |
| Security | Dan Sullivan (R-AK) | Ed Markey (D-MA) |
| Transportation and Safety | Deb Fischer (R-NE) | Tammy Duckworth (D-IL) |

=== 115th Congress ===
| Majority | Minority |
|---|---|
| John Thune, South Dakota, Chair; Roger Wicker, Mississippi; Roy Blunt, Missouri; Ted Cruz, Texas; Deb Fischer, Nebraska; Jerry Moran, Kansas; Dan Sullivan, Alaska; Dean Heller, Nevada; Jim Inhofe, Oklahoma; Mike Lee, Utah; Ron Johnson, Wisconsin; Shelley Moore Capito, West Virginia; Cory Gardner, Colorado; Todd Young, Indiana | Bill Nelson, Florida, Ranking Member; Maria Cantwell, Washington; Amy Klobuchar, Minnesota; Richard Blumenthal, Connecticut; Brian Schatz, Hawaii; Ed Markey, Massachusetts; Tom Udall, New Mexico; Gary Peters, Michigan; Tammy Baldwin, Wisconsin; Tammy Duckworth, Illinois; Maggie Hassan, New Hampshire; Catherine Cortez Masto, Nevada; Jon Tester, Montana |
