= United States Senate Commerce Subcommittee on Telecommunications and Media =

Subcommittee of the United States Senate

The Subcommittee on Telecommunications and Media is a subcommittee within the Senate Committee on Commerce, Science and Transportation. It was renamed from the Subcommittee on Communications, Media, and Broadband at the start of the 119th United States Congress. Prior to the 117th Congress, it was named the Subcommittee on Communications, Technology, Innovation, and the Internet. Prior to the 111th Congress, it was known as the Subcommittee on Science, Technology, and Innovation.

== Jurisdiction ==
The Subcommittee on Communications, Media, and Broadband has jurisdiction over all sectors of communications, including: wired and wireless telephony; the Internet; commercial and noncommercial television; cable; satellite broadcast; satellite communications; wireline and wireless broadband; radio; spectrum and consumer electronic equipment associated with such services, and public safety communications.

The Subcommittee also is responsible for oversight of the Federal Communications Commission (FCC), the Corporation for Public Broadcasting (CPB), and the National Telecommunications and Information Administration (NTIA) at the Department of Commerce, which is the administration primarily responsible for the management of government spectrum and advising the President on telecommunications policy.

== Members, 119th Congress ==
Majority	Minority
Deb Fischer, Nebraska, Chair; John Thune, South Dakota; Roger Wicker, Mississippi; Jerry Moran, Kansas; Dan Sullivan, Alaska; Marsha Blackburn, Tennessee; Todd Young, Indiana; Ted Budd, North Carolina; Eric Schmitt, Missouri; John Curtis, Utah; Tim Sheehy, Montana; Bernie Moreno, Ohio; Shelley Moore Capito, West Virginia; Cynthia Lummis, Wyoming	Ben Ray Luján, New Mexico, Ranking Member; Amy Klobuchar, Minnesota; Brian Schatz, Hawaii; Ed Markey, Massachusetts; Gary Peters, Michigan; Tammy Duckworth, Illinois; Jacky Rosen, Nevada; John Hickenlooper, Colorado; John Fetterman, Pennsylvania; Andy Kim, New Jersey; Lisa Blunt Rochester, Delaware
Ex officio
Ted Cruz, Texas	Maria Cantwell, Washington

== Historical subcommittee rosters ==
Majority	Minority
Ben Ray Luján, New Mexico, Chair; Amy Klobuchar, Minnesota; Richard Blumenthal, Connecticut; Brian Schatz, Hawaii; Ed Markey, Massachusetts; Gary Peters, Michigan; Tammy Baldwin, Wisconsin; Tammy Duckworth, Illinois; Jon Tester, Montana; Kyrsten Sinema, Arizona; Jacky Rosen, Nevada; John Hickenlooper, Colorado; Raphael Warnock, Georgia; Peter Welch, Vermont	John Thune, South Dakota, Ranking Member; Roger Wicker, Mississippi; Deb Fischer, Nebraska; Jerry Moran, Kansas; Dan Sullivan, Alaska; Marsha Blackburn, Tennessee; Todd Young, Indiana; Ted Budd, North Carolina; Eric Schmitt, Missouri; Shelley Moore Capito, West Virginia; JD Vance, Ohio; Cynthia Lummis, Wyoming
Ex officio
Maria Cantwell, Washington	Ted Cruz, Texas

=== 117th Congress ===
Majority	Minority
Ben Ray Luján, New Mexico, Chair; Amy Klobuchar, Minnesota; Richard Blumenthal, Connecticut; Brian Schatz, Hawaii; Ed Markey, Massachusetts; Gary Peters, Michigan; Tammy Baldwin, Wisconsin; Tammy Duckworth, Illinois; Jon Tester, Montana; Kyrsten Sinema, Arizona; Jacky Rosen, Nevada; John Hickenlooper, Colorado; Raphael Warnock, Georgia	John Thune, South Dakota, Ranking Member; Roy Blunt, Missouri; Ted Cruz, Texas; Deb Fischer, Nebraska; Jerry Moran, Kansas; Dan Sullivan, Alaska; Marsha Blackburn, Tennessee; Todd Young, Indiana; Mike Lee, Utah; Ron Johnson, Wisconsin; Shelley Moore Capito, West Virginia; Rick Scott, Florida; Cynthia Lummis, Wyoming
Ex officio
Maria Cantwell, Washington	Roger Wicker, Mississippi

=== 116th Congress ===
Majority	Minority
John Thune, South Dakota, Chairman; Marsha Blackburn, Tennessee; Roy Blunt, Missouri; Shelley Moore Capito, West Virginia; Ted Cruz, Texas; Deb Fischer, Nebraska; Cory Gardner, Colorado; Ron Johnson, Wisconsin; Jerry Moran, Kansas; Mike Lee, Utah; Rick Scott, Florida; Dan Sullivan, Alaska; Todd Young, Indiana	Brian Schatz, Hawaii, Ranking Member; Tammy Baldwin, Wisconsin; Richard Blumenthal, Connecticut; Tammy Duckworth, Illinois; Amy Klobuchar, Minnesota; Ed Markey, Massachusetts; Gary Peters, Michigan; Jacky Rosen, Nevada; Kyrsten Sinema, Arizona; Jon Tester, Montana; Tom Udall, New Mexico
Ex officio
Roger Wicker, Mississippi	Maria Cantwell, Washington
