= Chris Smith =

Chris Smith may refer to:

== Arts and entertainment ==
=== Music ===
- Chris Smith (composer) (1879–1949), American composer and performer
- Chris "Frenchie" Smith, American record producer and musician
- Chris "Daddy Mac" Smith, member of rap music duo Kris Kross
- Chris Smith, lead guitarist/vocalist in the band Keelhaul
- Chris Smith, vocalist in Mythology
- Chris Smith, touring drums in Short Stack
- Chris Smith, keyboardist in Jefferson Starship
- Chris Smith, drummer and producer, member of The Internet

=== Other media ===
- Chris Smith (broadcaster), Australian talkback radio broadcaster and radio host
- Chris Smith (filmmaker) (born 1970), American filmmaker
- Chris Smith (newsreader), British author and radio journalist
- Chris Smith (EastEnders), fictional soap opera character

== Politics ==
- Chris Smith (New Jersey politician) (born 1953), U.S. Representative from New Jersey
- Chris Smith (Florida politician) (born 1970), Florida state senator
- Chris Smith, Baron Smith of Finsbury (born 1951), former British Member of Parliament and government minister

== Sports ==
=== Association football ===
- Chris Smith (footballer, born 1981), English footballer
- Chris Smith (footballer, born 1986), Scottish footballer
- Chris Smith (footballer, born 1988), Scottish footballer
- Chris Smith (footballer, born 1990), English footballer
- Chris Smith (footballer, born 1998), English footballer

=== Baseball ===
- Chris Smith (first baseman) (born 1957), American baseball player
- Chris Smith (pitcher, born 1981), American baseball player
- Chris Smith (pitcher, born 1988), American baseball player

=== Basketball ===
- Chris Smith (basketball, born 1939), American college basketball player at Virginia Tech
- Chris Smith (basketball, born 1970), American basketball player in the 1990s
- Chris Smith (basketball, born 1987), American basketball player, attended Manhattan and Louisville
- Chris Smith (basketball, born 1999), American basketball player, attended UCLA

=== American football ===
- Chris Smith (American football coach), American former college football coach
- Chris Smith (2010s defensive back) (born 1987), American football defensive back
- Chris Smith II (born 2000), American football defensive back
- Chris Smith (defensive end) (1992–2023), American football player
- Chris Smith (defensive tackle) (born 1999), American football player
- Chris Smith (running back, born 1963), American football player
- Chris Smith (running back, born 1999), American football player
- Chris Smith (safety, born 1985) (born 1985), American football safety in the Canadian Football League
- Chris Smith (tight end) (born 1966), American football player

=== Rugby ===
- Chris Smith (rugby league, born 1975), Welsh rugby league footballer
- Chris Smith (rugby league, born 1994), Australian rugby league footballer
- Chris Smith (rugby union) (born 1994), South African rugby union player

=== Other sports ===
- Chris Billam-Smith (born 1990), British boxer
- Chris Smith (Australian footballer) (born 1955), Australian rules footballer for Fitzroy
- Chris Smith (Australian footballer, born 1988), Australian rules footballer from Queensland, drafted by Fremantle
- Chris Smith (cricketer, born 1958) (born 1958), English cricketer
- Chris Smith (cricketer, born 1973), Australian-born former Dutch cricketer
- Chris Smith (racing driver) (born 1966), race car driver, 1992 Atlantic Series Champion
- Chris Smith (golfer) (born 1969), American PGA Tour golfer

== Others ==
- Chris Smith (science communicator) (born 1975), medical doctor and radio broadcaster on the BBC
- Chris Smith (biologist), professor of biology
- Chris Smith (priest) (born 1963), archdeacon of Morgannwg
- Chris Smith (American academic) (born 1958), American legal academic
- Christopher Arthur Smith (1892–1952), known as Chris (A.), South Australian architect

== See also ==
- Christopher Smith (disambiguation)
- Christian Smith (disambiguation)
- Christine Smith (disambiguation)
- Christina Smith (disambiguation)
