= Christina Smith =

Christina Smith may refer to:

- Christina Smith (bobsleigh) (born 1968), Canadian Olympic bobsledder
- Christina Smith (missionary) (1809–1893), Australian settler, teacher and lay missionary
- Christina Smith (model) (born 1957), American model and Playboy Playmate of the Month
- Christina Smith (make-up artist) (born 1945), American make-up artist
- Christina Smith (property developer) (1934–2022), British businesswoman who developed Covent Garden.
- Christina Gokey-Smith (born 1973), American cyclist

== See also ==
- Christine Smith (disambiguation)
- Chris Smith (disambiguation)
- Christopher Smith (disambiguation)
- Christian Smith (disambiguation)
