= Christine Smith =

Christine Smith is the name of:

- Christine Smith (model) (born 1979), American Playboy model
- Christine Smith (politician) (born 1946), former Labor member of the Queensland Legislative Assembly
- Christine Smith (skier) (1946–1979), Olympic skier for Australia
- Christine Shoecraft Smith (1866–1954), 13th president of the National Association of Colored Women's Clubs
- Christine Collins (rower) (born 1969), American rower
- Tina Smith full name Christine Elizabeth Flint Smith (born 1958), junior United States senator from Minnesota

== See also ==
- Christina Smith (disambiguation)
- Chris Smith (disambiguation)
- Christopher Smith (disambiguation)
- Christian Smith (disambiguation)
