= Christopher Smith =

Christopher Smith may refer to:

== Entertainment ==
- Christopher Webb Smith (1793–1871), English-born bird painter and public official
- Christopher Smith (performer) (born 1959), American actor, director and improviser
- Christopher Corey Smith (born 1962), American voice actor
- Christopher Smith (director) (born 1970), British film director
- Christopher Smith (English actor) (born 1984), English actor
- Christopher Bjorn Smith Jr. (born 1991), American rapper and singer
- Christopher Nicholas Smith, American film and television actor
- Christopher Allan Smith, drummer with The Internet

== Sports ==
- Christopher Smith (linebacker) (born 1988), Canadian football linebacker
- Christopher Smith II (born 2000), American football player

== Others ==
- Christopher Smith (MP, died 1589) (by 1510–1589), English politician
- Christopher Smith (MP, died 1835), English Lord Mayor of London and Member of Parliament
- Christopher Arthur Smith (1892–1952), South Australian architect
- Christopher Neil-Smith (1920–1995), Anglican exorcist
- Christopher Llewellyn Smith (born 1942), British physicist
- Christopher N. Smith (born 1964), American attorney at law and foreign consul
- Christopher Smith (classicist) (born 1965), ancient historian, Director of the British School at Rome
- Christopher William Smith (born 1980), American e-mail spammer
- Chris Smith (New Jersey politician) (born 1953), American congressman

== Fictional characters ==
- Peacemaker (character), superhero from DC Universe, real name Christopher Smith
  - Peacemaker (DC Extended Universe character), the film adaptation of the character portrayed by John Cena
- A character in The Spoils of Babylon and The Spoils Before Dying

== See also ==
- Chris Smith (disambiguation)
- Christian Smith (disambiguation)
- Christine Smith (disambiguation)
- Christina Smith (disambiguation)
