= Brandon Meriweather =

American football player (born 1984)

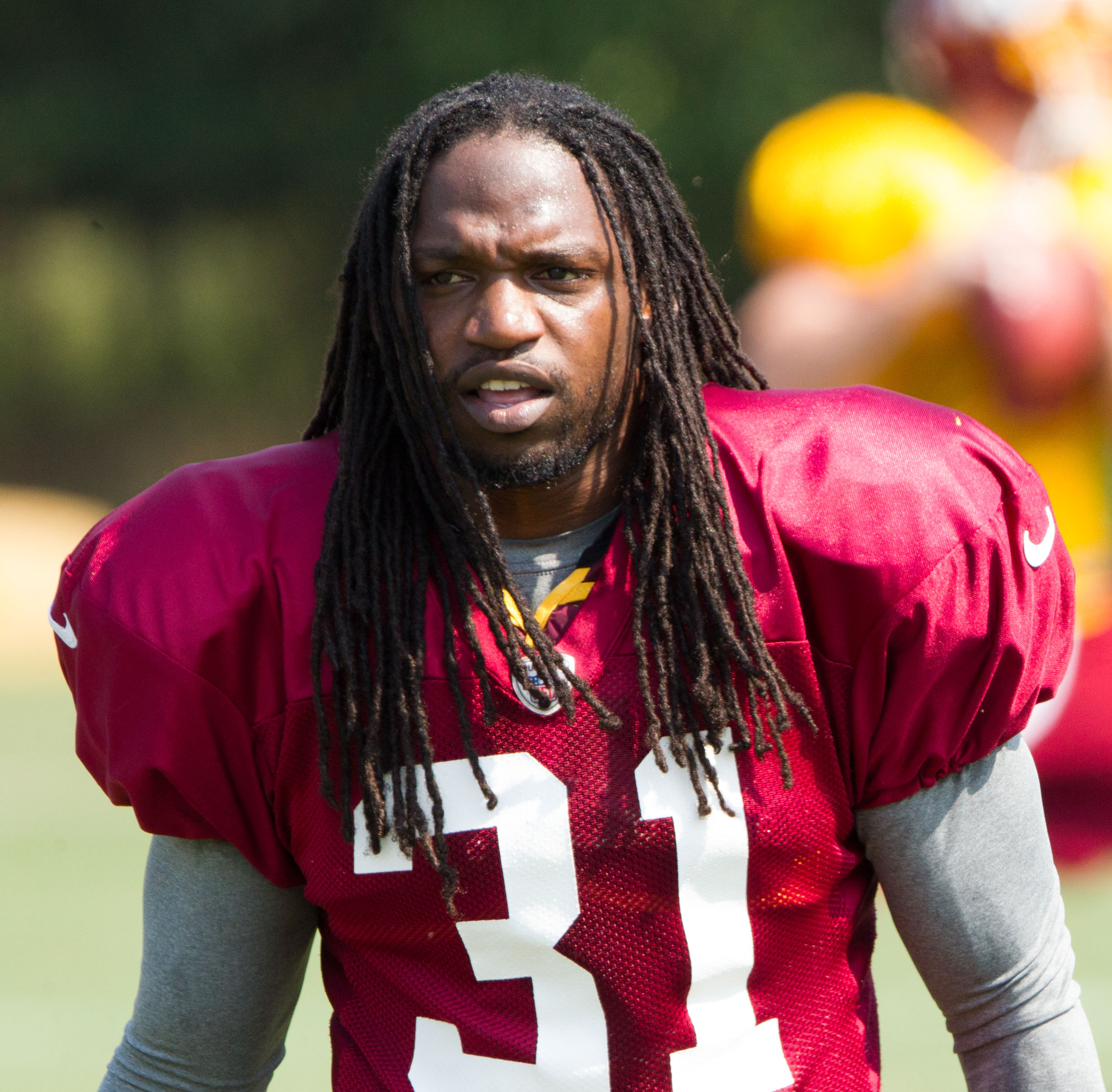
- Meriweather with the Washington Redskins in 2012

No. 31, 22
- Position: Safety

Personal information
- Born: January 14, 1984 (age 42); Apopka, Florida, U.S.
- Listed height: 5 ft 11 in (1.80 m)
- Listed weight: 197 lb (89 kg)

Career information
- High school: Apopka
- College: Miami (FL) (2002–2006)
- NFL draft: 2007: 1st round, 24th overall pick

Career history
- New England Patriots (2007–2010); Chicago Bears (2011); Washington Redskins (2012–2014); New York Giants (2015)

Awards and highlights
- 2× Pro Bowl (2009, 2010); First-team All-American (2005); 2× Second-team All-ACC (2005, 2006)

Career NFL statistics
- Total tackles: 414
- Sacks: 6.0
- Forced fumbles: 9
- Fumble recoveries: 3
- Interceptions: 17
- Defensive touchdowns: 1
- Stats at Pro Football Reference

Brandon Meriweather (born January 14, 1984) is an American former professional football player who was a safety in the National Football League (NFL). He played college football for the Miami Hurricanes, and was selected by the New England Patriots in the first round of the 2007 NFL draft. Meriweather also played for the Chicago Bears, Washington Redskins, and New York Giants.

== Early life ==
Meriweather's mother gave birth to him when she was 13 years old. Meriweather started living with his adopted parents at age 11. He attended Apopka High School in Apopka, Florida, where he played high school football. He helped lead his school to the Florida Class 6A state championship as a senior in 2001. He started as a kick returner, returning four kicks for touchdowns as a senior. He also lettered in track and basketball.

== College career ==
Meriweather received an athletic scholarship to attend the University of Miami and played for the Miami Hurricanes football team. In 2002, he played in three games and had three total tackles before injuring his ankle, and was given a medical redshirt by the NCAA. In 2003, Meriweather played the majority of the season on special teams and in different nickel and dime packages. He got his first start against West Virginia as a nickel back. He finished the year with 22 tackles, one interception and five pass break-ups.

Meriweather played in all 12 games of the 2004 season but only started seven because of a nagging shoulder injury. He contributed 62 tackles, a half sack, two forced fumbles, five pass break-ups and two interceptions. He received the team's 2004 Hard Hitter Award.

Meriweather was named to the All-America team as voted by the Football Writers Association of America (FWAA) and was also selected first-team All-ACC in 2005. He was also a semi-finalist for the Jim Thorpe Award. He led the team with a career-high 115 tackles, seven pass break-ups, one sack, one fumble recovery, two forced fumbles and three interceptions. He received the team's Hard Hitter Award for the second consecutive season.

In 2006 Meriweather was a member of the 50th Anniversary Playboy Preseason All-America Team and was also on the Thorpe Award watch list for the second straight year. In 12 games, Meriweather registered 91 tackles, one sack, eight pass break-ups and one interception. He was also a semi-finalist for the Jim Thorpe Award, and was voted first-team All-ACC and All-American. He left Miami with the record for most tackles by a defensive back with 293.

Meriweather was invited to the Senior Bowl at the end of the season.

=== Controversies ===
==== 7th Floor Crew ====
Meriweather was a member of the 7th Floor Crew, a rap group which consisted of several members of the Miami Hurricanes football team, including Greg Olsen, Jon Beason and Tavares Gooden. The group created controversy with their sexually explicit rap lyrics which were criticized as being misogynistic and profane.

==== Shooting incident ====
On July 21, 2006, Meriweather was involved in a shooting incident when teammate Willie Cooper was shot in the buttocks. In self-defense, Meriweather returned fire and shot at the unidentified shooters three times. He was not charged with a crime because his gun was owned legally.

==== Miami-FIU Brawl ====
During the Miami-FIU brawl on October 14, 2006, Meriweather was seen stomping multiple times on several Florida International players on the ground. Meriweather was ultimately suspended by the ACC and Miami for his role in the incident. It is believed that his actions during the brawl and the shooting incident may have caused his draft stock to slip.

== Professional career ==
Pre-draft measurables
Height	Weight	Arm length	Hand span	40-yard dash	10-yard split	20-yard split	20-yard shuttle	Three-cone drill	Vertical jump	Broad jump	Bench press
5 ft 10 5/8 in (1.79 m)	195 lb (88 kg)	31 in (0.79 m)	8 1/4 in (0.21 m)	4.56 s	1.64 s	2.68 s	4.33 s	7.06 s	35.0 in (0.89 m)	9 ft 3 in (2.82 m)	11 reps
All values from NFL Combine

=== New England Patriots ===
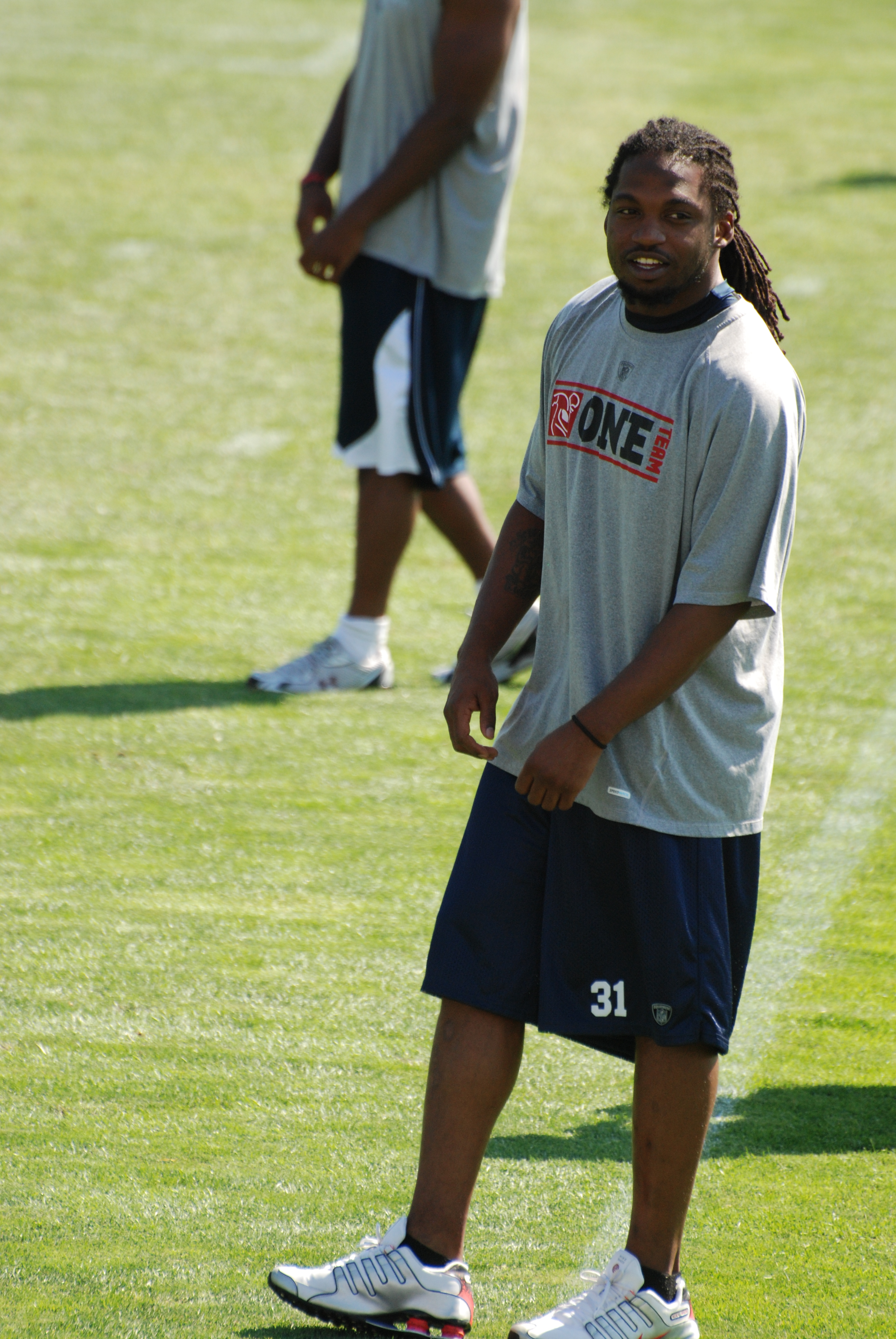
Meriweather with the Patriots, 2010

Meriweather was selected in the first round (24th overall) of the 2007 NFL draft by the New England Patriots. The pick used to select Meriweather was traded by the Seattle Seahawks in exchange for Deion Branch. During his rookie season most of his time was spent on special teams, and he finished the season with 28 tackles. He played in Super Bowl XLII as a fourth safety in the Patriots' defense behind Rodney Harrison, James Sanders, and Eugene Wilson. During his second season in 2008, Meriweather recorded his first career interception in Week 2 off New York Jets quarterback Brett Favre. After starting strong safety Rodney Harrison suffered a season-ending injury against the Denver Broncos in Week 7, Meriweather started the final 11 games. In Week 14, Meriweather recorded his first career sack to stifle a late-game Seattle Seahawks drive and secure a Patriots victory. He finished the season with 83 tackles, two sacks, and four interceptions.

In Week 7, Meriweather had two interceptions against the Tampa Bay Buccaneers, including one returned 39 yards for a touchdown, and was named AFC Defensive Player of the Week. He started all 16 games and finished the 2009 season with 83 tackles and five interceptions, and was named to his first Pro Bowl as a replacement to the injured Jairus Byrd.

Meriweather was not part of the Patriots base defense to begin the 2010 season, something which Meriweather described as a coaching decision as a result of him freelancing in the defense during training camp. After being replaced as a starter in Weeks 2 and 3 by James Sanders, Meriweather returned to his starting role in Week 4.

In Week 6, Meriweather was penalized for a helmet-to-helmet hit on Baltimore Ravens tight end Todd Heap. While Heap walked off the field and would later return, the hit, grouped together with other helmet-to-helmet hits on defenseless receivers from NFL players during the week, sparked controversy over the protection of players. The NFL took action the following Tuesday when they fined Meriweather $50,000 for the hit. Following the game, the league announced that it would begin suspending players for dangerous hits, particularly those involving helmet to helmet hits on defenseless receivers.

In 16 games played (13 starts), Meriweather recorded 68 tackles, three interceptions, and six passes defensed. He was named to his second Pro Bowl following the season.

During final cuts on September 3, 2011, Meriweather was released by the New England Patriots.

=== Chicago Bears ===
Meriweather signed with the Chicago Bears on September 4, 2011, to a one-year deal. After Week 4 of 2011 NFL season against the Carolina Panthers, he was fined $20,000 for a helmet-to-helmet hit against Steve Smith. The week after he was fined $25,000 for an unnecessary roughness penalty due to a late hit after the end of a play against the Detroit Lions. Former Bears wide receiver, Tom Waddle, negatively criticized Meriweather's tackling technique stating that it doesn't show any regard for the safety of other players.

=== Washington Redskins ===
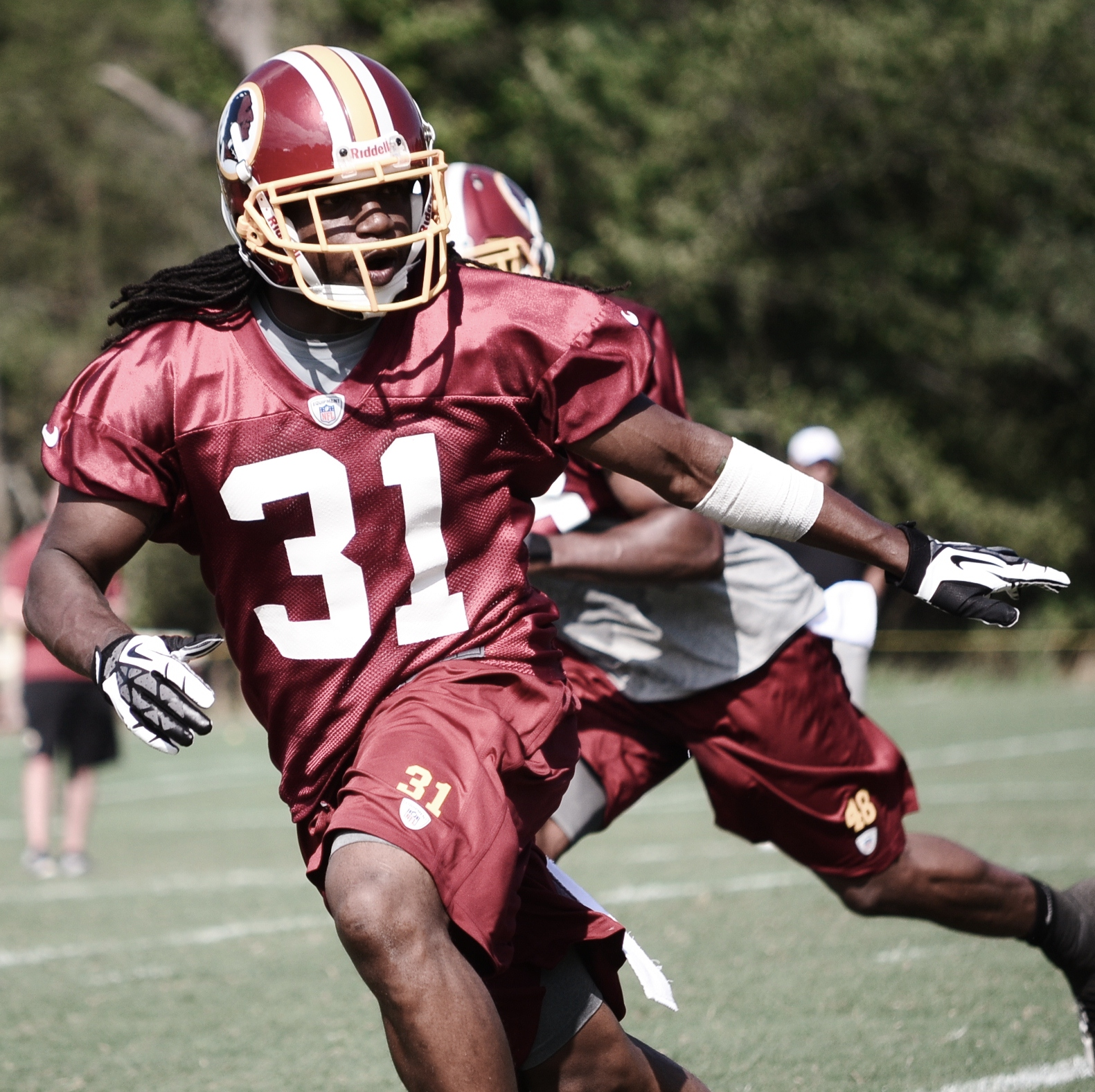
Meriweather with the Washington Redskins, 2012

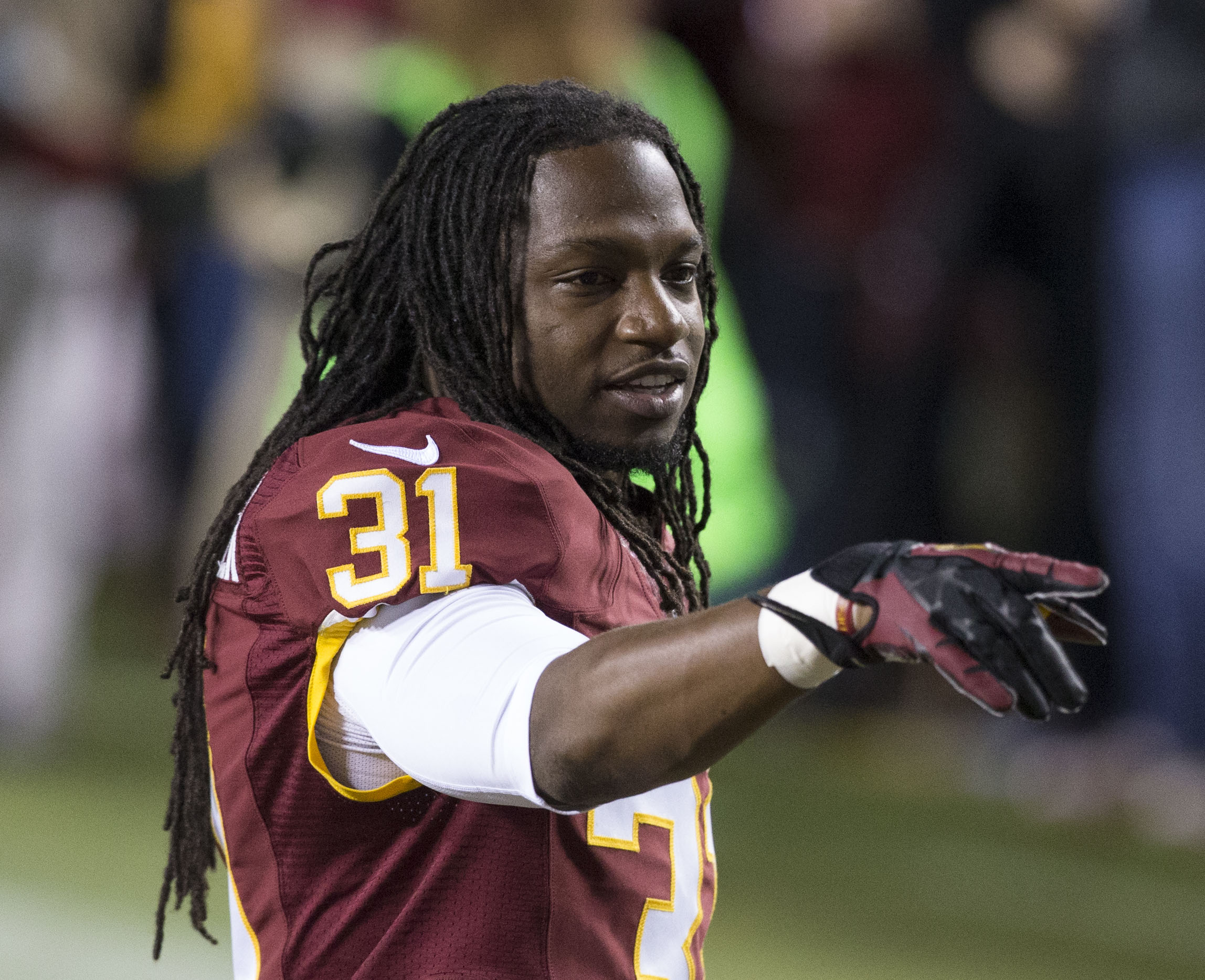
Meriweather with the Redskins, 2014

Meriweather signed a two-year, $6 million contract with the Washington Redskins on March 15, 2012. In practice on September 3, he suffered a sprain in the medial collateral ligament and posterior cruciate ligament in his left knee. After missing the first three games, he was expected to make his 2012 season debut in Week 4 against the Tampa Bay Buccaneers. He ended up colliding with Aldrick Robinson during pre-game warmups and both were inactive for the game, due to Meriweather re-injuring his knee and Robinson out with a concussion.

He would finally make his debut for the Redskins in their game against the Philadelphia Eagles on November 18, where he had a significant impact early in the game registering one interception and multiple hard hitting tackles, but left in the second half with a right knee injury. It was confirmed the next day that Meriweather suffered a right ACL tear and would miss the remainder of the 2012 season on injured reserve.

In his 2013 debut against the Green Bay Packers, Meriweather gave running back Eddie Lacy a concussion after having helmet-to-helmet collision and later gave himself a concussion after another helmet-to-helmet hit with James Starks. After the week two game, he was fined $42,000 for the helmet-to-helmet hit on Lacy. In the Week 7 game against the Chicago Bears, Meriweather was penalized for two illegal hits on receivers, Brandon Marshall and Alshon Jeffery. On October 21, 2013, he was suspended for two games because of repeated violations of the league's helmet-to-helmet policy. Two days later, his suspension was reduced to one game. The amended one-game suspension was without pay and cost Meriweather $70,588 of his $1.2 million salary for that season.

During his late October 2013 suspension, Meriweather made comments to the press about how he would need to change his style of play. "I guess I just got to take people's knees out. That's the only way. I would hate to end a guy's career over a rule, but I guess it's better other people than me getting suspended for longer. You just have to go low now, man. You've got to end people's careers. You got to tear people's ACLs and mess up people's knees. You can't hit them high anymore." He also responded to Brandon Marshall's comments towards him getting kicked out the league with "He feel like I need to be kicked out of the league? You know, I feel like people who beat their girlfriends should be kicked out the league, too. So, you tell me who you'd rather have: Somebody who play aggressive on the field, or somebody who beat up their girlfriend? You know, everybody got their opinion, so that's mine, that's his." The NFL discussed the comments with Meriweather and decided not to take disciplinary action against him.

The Redskins re-signed him to a one-year contract on March 17. 2014. On August 25, 2014, a few days after the Redskins third preseason game, Meriweather was suspended for two games due to an illegal hit on Baltimore Ravens wide receiver Torrey Smith. In a Week 8 win against the Dallas Cowboys, he had a standout performance. In the overtime victory, he recorded two sacks, two forced fumbles, and a fumble recovery after cornerback Bashaud Breeland stripped DeMarco Murray. He was placed on injured reserve on December 19, 2014.

=== New York Giants ===
On August 16, 2015, Meriweather agreed to terms with the New York Giants. On December 16, he was released by the Giants. On December 23, Meriweather was re-signed by the Giants.

== NFL career statistics ==
Year	Team	GP	Comb	Solo	Asst	Sack	FF	FR	Yds	Int	Yds	Avg	Lng	TD	PD
2007	NE	16	27	18	9	0.0	1	0	0	0	0	0.0	0	0	3
2008	NE	16	83	61	22	2.0	2	0	0	4	25	6.3	19	0	9
2009	NE	16	83	53	30	0.0	2	0	0	5	149	29.8	56	1	9
2010	NE	16	68	49	19	0.0	0	1	0	3	39	13.0	39	0	6
2011	CHI	11	32	19	13	0.0	0	0	0	0	0	0.0	0	0	2
2012	WAS	1	7	3	4	0.0	0	0	0	1	25	25.0	25	0	2
2013	WAS	13	69	53	16	1.0	1	1	0	2	62	31.0	32	0	3
2014	WAS	10	55	36	19	3.0	3	1	0	0	0	0.0	0	0	3
2015	NYG	13	59	43	16	0.0	0	0	0	2	26	13.0	26	0	7
Total		112	483	335	148	6.0	9	3	0	17	326	19.2	56	1	44

== Controversy ==
=== Arrest on suspicion of DWI ===
On April 25, 2012, Meriweather was arrested in Arlington County, Virginia, on suspicion of driving while intoxicated, according to a press account. He was initially stopped for speeding on westbound I-66, according to Arlington County police spokesman Dustin Sternbeck, who also said that officers detected an odor of alcohol on his breath and performed a field sobriety test, which Meriweather failed. Sternbeck further stated that Meriweather refused a breathalyzer test, was arrested and spent the night in the Arlington County jail. According to the press account, "Police say Meriweather claimed he was driving home from a club in D.C., but couldn't remember the name of the club."
