= Christian Smith =

Christian Smith may refer to:

- Christian Smith (sociologist) (born 1960), American professor at the University of Notre Dame
- Christian Smith (footballer) (born 1987), English footballer
- Christian Smith (runner) (born 1983), middle-distance runner for the Oregon Track Club Elite
- Christian Smith (musician), bassoonist at Brigham Young University
- Christian Smith (DJ), Swedish DJ and producer
- Christian Jollie Smith (1885–1963), socialist lawyer and co-founder of the Communist Party of Australia
- Christen Smith (1785–1816), Norwegian naturalist whose name is sometimes spelled Christian Smith or Chretien Smith

== See also ==
- Chris Smith (disambiguation)
- Christopher Smith (disambiguation)
- Christine Smith (disambiguation)
- Christina Smith (disambiguation)
