= FIU–Miami football brawl =

FIU-Miami football brawl
FIU Golden Panthers	Miami Hurricanes
(0–7)	(4–2)
0	35
Head coach: Don Strock	Head coach: Larry Coker
	1	2	3	4	Total
FIU	0	0	0	0	0
Miami	0	7	14	14	35
- Date: October 14, 2006
- Season: 2006
- Stadium: Miami Orange Bowl
- Location: Miami, Florida, U.S.
- Referee: Jerry Magallanes

United States TV coverage
- Network: Comcast/Charter Sports Southeast
- Announcers: Jason Solankin (play-by-play) Lamar Thomas (color)

The FIU–Miami football brawl was a bench-clearing brawl that occurred on October 14, 2006, during a college football game between the University of Miami Hurricanes and the Florida International University Golden Panthers (now Panthers) at the Miami Orange Bowl in Miami, Florida, United States.

== Background ==
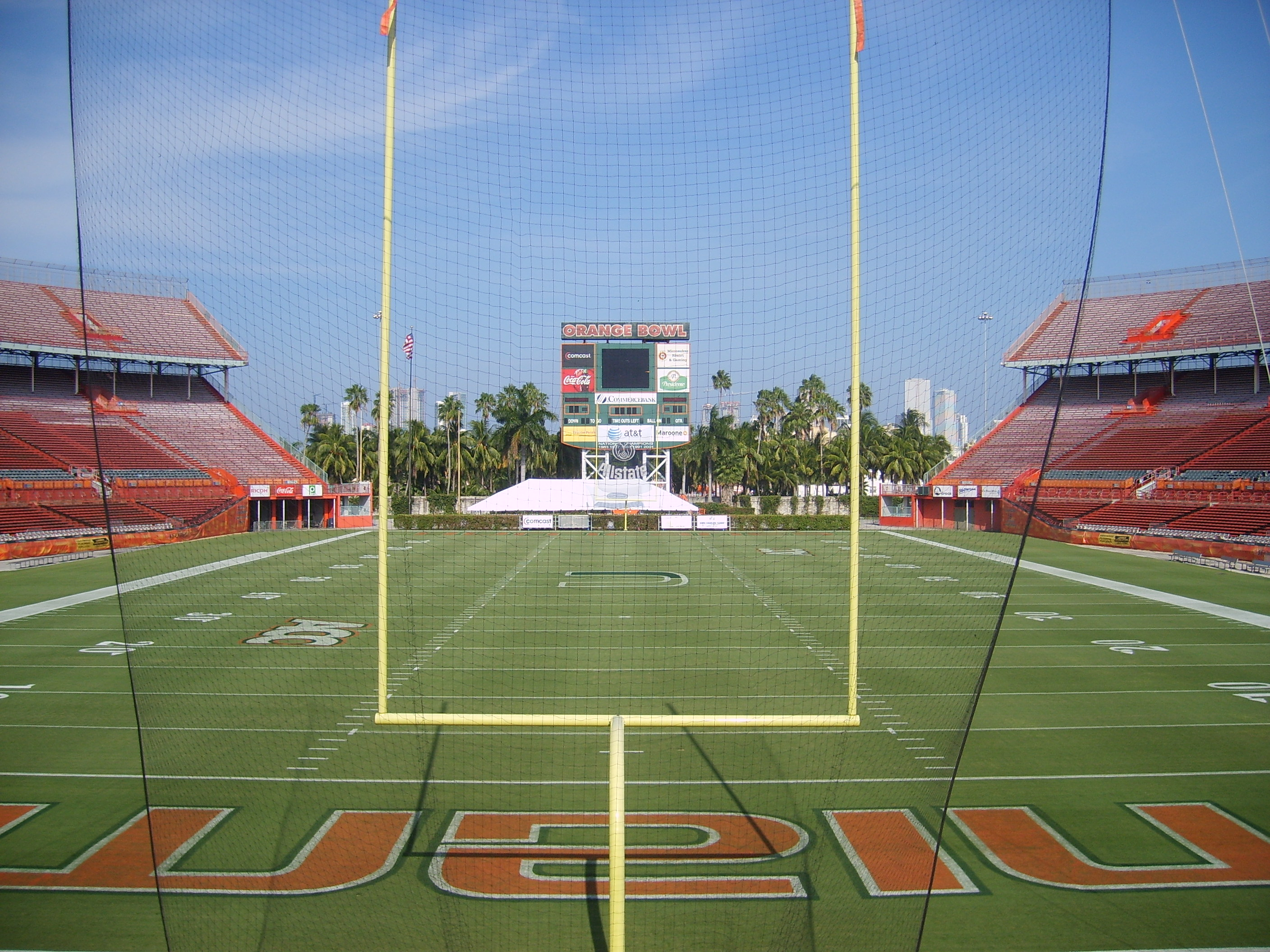
The brawl occurred on the field at the Miami Orange Bowl.

The main campuses of Florida International University (FIU) and the University of Miami (Miami) are only nine miles (14 km) apart. FIU is a public university located in western Miami, playing at FIU Stadium. Miami is a private university in the suburb of Coral Gables, which at the time played its home games at the Miami Orange Bowl. The game in which the brawl took place was intended to be the first in the "City Line Series," an annual series between the two Miami-area schools. Miami was heavily favored over FIU, which was in its fifth season of football and in its second year in the National Collegiate Athletic Association's (NCAA) Division I Football Bowl Subdivision.

== Brawl ==
Throughout the game, players from both teams engaged in trash talk and were increasingly physical. By the third quarter, officials had assessed seven penalties, six for FIU and one for Miami.

With nine minutes left in the third quarter, Miami H-back James Bryant caught a 5-yard touchdown pass from quarterback Kyle Wright, making the score 13–0 Miami. After scoring, Bryant bowed towards Miami's west end zone, and was called for unsportsmanlike conduct.

During the ensuing extra point attempt, FIU safety Chris Smith wrestled Miami holder Matt Perelli to the ground after the kick and appeared to punch him in the chin. FIU cornerback Marshall McDuffie Jr. kicked Perelli in the head. Miami players, including Calais Campbell, came to Perelli's defense, separating Miami and FIU players. FIU's Lionell Singleton punched Campbell in the back of the helmet, which was quickly followed by retaliation from both teams, escalating the fight to a bench-clearing brawl. Miami's Anthony Reddick swung his helmet at an FIU player and Miami's Brandon Meriweather kicked and stomped on several FIU players. FIU's A'Mod Ned, who was previously injured, came onto the field and swung at Miami players with his crutches. The fight lasted less than two minutes with Florida Highway Patrol officers and FIU campus police coming onto the field to restore order.

Officials needed several minutes to sort out the penalties. Ultimately, thirteen players were assessed 15-yard penalties for fighting and ejected from the game (eight from FIU and five from Miami). Although the unsportsmanlike conduct penalties for fighting offset each other, Miami was forced to kick off from its own 10-yard line due to the original penalty against Bryant (penalized at half the distance to the goal).

After the brawl, while waiting for the game to resume, the Miami team was seen huddled in a circle on the sidelines hopping up and down in what appeared to be a celebratory gesture. There were also several fights in the stands between Miami and FIU fans which were stopped by local police. Former Miami wide receiver Lamar Thomas, who was providing color commentary for the game on Comcast Sports Southeast, made several observations during the fight, saying:

Now, that's what I'm talking about. You come into our house, you should get your behind kicked. You don't come into the OB [Orange Bowl] playing that stuff. You're across the ocean over there. You're across the city. You can't come over to our place talking noise like that. You'll get your butt beat. I was about to go down the elevator to get in that thing ... I say, why don't we meet outside in the tunnel after the ball game and get it on some more? You don't come into the OB, baby. We've had a down couple of years but you don't come in here talking smack. Not in our house.

== Aftermath ==
The incident was instantly condemned by all sides. FIU head coach Don Strock said he was "embarrassed" for what happened and said that he would impose sanctions even more severe than any imposed by the Sun Belt Conference, in which FIU played at the time. Miami head coach Larry Coker said he was "shocked and angered" by the brawl but made no promises of further sanctions.

The next day, 31 players from both schools — eighteen from FIU, thirteen from Miami — were handed one-game suspensions by their schools and conferences.

- For FIU: cornerback Marshall McDuffie Jr., cornerback Chris Smith, offensive lineman Michael Alls, linebacker Mannie Wellington, linebacker Michael Dominguez, linebacker Scott Bryant, defensive lineman Roland Clarke, fullback John Ellis, defensive back Cory Fleming, defensive lineman Reginald Jones, defensive back Robert Mitchell, linebacker Quentin Newman, defensive lineman Luis Pena, defensive end Jarvis Penerton, running back Julian Reams, defensive back Lionell Singleton, tight end Samuel Smith, and wide receiver Chandler Williams.
- For Miami: cornerback Carlos Armour, offensive tackle Chris Barney, H-back James Bryant, offensive tackle Tyrone Byrd, tight end DajLeon Farr, wide receiver Ryan Hill, cornerback Bruce Johnson, running back Charlie Jones, safety Brandon Meriweather, punter Brian Monroe, offensive guard Derrick Morse, cornerback Randy Phillips, and safety Anthony Reddick.

In both schools' cases, the suspensions were not staggered, which was unusual considering the number of players involved. The ejected players (Chris Smith, McDuffie, Singleton, Ellis, Williams, Wellington and Penerton for FIU; Morse, Barney, Jones, Armour, Johnson and Samuel Smith for Miami) already faced minimum one-game suspensions under NCAA regulations for ejections.

On Monday, Miami's coach suspended Meriweather and Reddick indefinitely and announced that the other players would have to complete community service and sit out the next game, against Duke. Miami, which already had a history of such incidents, enacted a "zero tolerance" policy for future incidents: any Hurricane involved in a fight will be suspended for the remainder of the season, and could face permanent banishment from the team. The same day, FIU kicked Smith and McDuffie off the team (though they were allowed to keep their scholarships) and the remaining players were suspended from the team indefinitely. FIU also placed the suspended players on probation for the remainder of the year. In contrast, Miami president Donna Shalala announced that the other twelve Miami players would not face additional suspensions.

ESPN.com's Gene Wojciechowski called Miami's one-game suspensions "a soothing caress and manicure" and described Reddick's actions as "criminal conduct." He called for Miami to fire Coker for "a continuing series of embarrassments" and for the school to also wipe the game from its records.

Lamar Thomas was fired by CSS, and the network edited out his comments when it rebroadcast the game on October 18. Later in the day, he told ESPN Radio's Dan Patrick that he had gotten carried away in the moment.

Coker also came under fire for some of his comments after the incident. "I think that it will affect the image of our program greatly, but in a positive way," he said. "I think that when they see the video and they see how it was handled they will be impressed with our players." His handling of the incident contributed to speculation that he would not return in 2007, Shalala's vote of confidence notwithstanding. Coker was fired at the end of the season, while Strock resigned at the end of the season. FIU ended the 2006 season 0–12 and went on to lose 23 straight games up to their final game of the 2007 season, a victory over North Texas.

FIU and Miami played the following season, on September 15, 2007, without incident, though security and police presence were markedly increased over the previous year. Miami won 23–9. FIU was coached by Mario Cristobal, who was previously Miami's offensive line coach. As the series had only been contracted for two games, they did not play each other the following year, and no immediate attempt was made to schedule another match for some time.

The two schools' football teams finally played each other again on September 22, 2018, marking the first game between the two since 2007. The game was held at Hard Rock Stadium, which serves as the home field for both the Hurricanes and the NFL's Miami Dolphins. Miami won 31–17. The teams faced off again the following year on November 23, 2019, with FIU serving as the home team. As FIU's stadium was deemed too small to hold the estimated crowd, FIU contracted to hold the game at Marlins Park, home to Major League Baseball's Miami Marlins, and the field and stadium were covered in FIU colors for the occasion. Marlins Park is built in the location previously occupied by the Miami Orange Bowl stadium before it was torn down in 2008, coincidentally setting the game at the same site as the 2006 brawl. In an upset, FIU won the game 30–24, giving them their first ever win over Miami. As there were no further games contracted in the series, they did not play again the following year and as of the beginning of 2022 no further games between the two have been scheduled.

In 2022, a short video compilation including Lamar Thomas' commentary was posted to the ESPN throwback YouTube channel.

== See also ==
- Clemson–South Carolina football brawl, a similar bench-clearing incident in 2004
