= Lamar Thomas =

American football player and color commentator (born 1970)

Profile
- Position: Wide receiver

Personal information
- Born: February 12, 1970 (age 56); Ocala, Florida, U.S.
- Listed height: 6 ft 1 in (1.85 m)
- Listed weight: 175 lb (79 kg)

Career information
- High school: Buchholz (Gainesville, Florida)
- College: Miami (FL) (1989–1992)
- NFL draft: 1993: 3rd round, 60th overall pick

Career history

Playing
- Tampa Bay Buccaneers (1993–1995); Miami Dolphins (1996–2000)

Coaching
- Hampton (2008–2010) Wide receivers coach; Western Kentucky (2011–2012) Wide receivers coach; Louisville (2013–2015) Wide receivers coach; Kentucky (2016–2018) Wide receivers coach; Salt Lake Stallions (2019) Wide receivers coach; Orlando Guardians (2023) Assistant head coach & wide receivers coach

Awards and highlights
- 2× National champion (1989, 1991); Second-team All-American (1992)

Career NFL statistics
- Receptions: 106
- Receiving yards: 1,558
- Touchdowns: 10
- Stats at Pro Football Reference

Lamar Nathaniel Thomas (born February 12, 1970) is an American football coach and former player who played professionally as a wide receiver in the National Football League (NFL). He played college football for the Miami Hurricanes, earning All-American honors in 1992.

== College career ==
Thomas played college football and college basketball and ran track at the University of Miami, then he was drafted in the third round of the 1993 NFL draft by the Tampa Bay Buccaneers. He is a University of Miami Sports Hall of Fame inductee, class of 2014.

With the Miami Hurricanes, Thomas set a then-school record for most receptions in a career (later eclipsed by Reggie Wayne). He was on the receiving end of the play known as "The Strip"—when Alabama's George Teague chased him down from behind and ripped the ball from his hands at the 10-yard line, preventing a sure touchdown during the 1993 Sugar Bowl, an Alabama rout of Miami.

Thomas was interviewed about his time at the University of Miami for the documentary The U, which premiered December 12, 2009 on ESPN.

== Playing career ==
Pre-draft measurables
Height	Weight	Arm length	Hand span	40-yard dash	10-yard split	20-yard split	Vertical jump
6 ft 1 1/4 in (1.86 m)	163 lb (74 kg)	31 7/8 in (0.81 m)	9 1/8 in (0.23 m)	4.58 s	1.65 s	2.68 s	34.0 in (0.86 m)

Thomas was drafted in the third round of the 1993 NFL Draft by the Tampa Bay Buccaneers. Thomas played eight seasons in the NFL as a wide receiver, three with the Buccaneers and five with the Miami Dolphins, where he had his greatest success. In his final year of NFL play, he had 43 receptions for 603 yards and five touchdowns. His last two seasons were spent on injured reserve (shoulder and hip).

== Post-playing career ==
Thomas worked as a color commentator for Comcast Sports Southeast until he was fired due to his comments during an on-field brawl between the University of Miami and Florida International University in 2006.

From 2013 to 2015, he worked as the Louisville Cardinals wide receivers coach after working with Louisville head coach Bobby Petrino at Western Kentucky University in the same position. With the Cardinals, he helped recruit future Heisman Trophy-winning quarterback Lamar Jackson; Jackson had caught Thomas' attention at Western Kentucky. He was the wide receivers coach at the University of Kentucky from 2016 to 2018. In 2019, he served the same position with the Salt Lake Stallions of the Alliance of American Football (AAF).

Thomas was officially hired by the Orlando Guardians on September 13, 2022 On January 1, 2024, it was announced the Guardians would not be a part of the UFL Merger.

=== Miami/FIU controversy ===
During an intense on-field brawl between Miami and FIU on October 14, 2006, Thomas defended his alma mater. Besides defending the Miami players, he expressed a desire to join the fight himself:

You come into our house, you should get your behind kicked. You don't come into the OB playing that stuff...You can't come over to our place talking noise like that. You'll get your butt beat. I was about to go down the elevator to get in that thing...why don't we meet outside in the tunnel after the ball game and get it on some more? You don't come into the OB, baby. We've had a down couple of years but you don't come in here talking smack. Not in our house.

Thomas later claimed he was joking about his comments, but two days after this incident, Comcast Sports Southeast fired him.

On the October 17, 2006, episode of Fox News Channel's Hannity & Colmes, Thomas said he got caught up in the moment and made a mistake. However, he said he did not blame Comcast for firing him.

== Personal life ==
In July 1996, Thomas was charged with aggravated battery against a pregnant female after beating his fiancée Ebony Cooksey. In February 1997, he pled no contest, and he was sentenced to eight days in jail and 18 months probation. In March 1997, he was arrested for allegedly beating Cooksey again, and he was charged with violating the terms of his probation. He was jailed until the May 1997 hearing.

His sister Jessica Thomas is a professional basketball player.
