= Anthony Reddick =

American football player (born 1985)

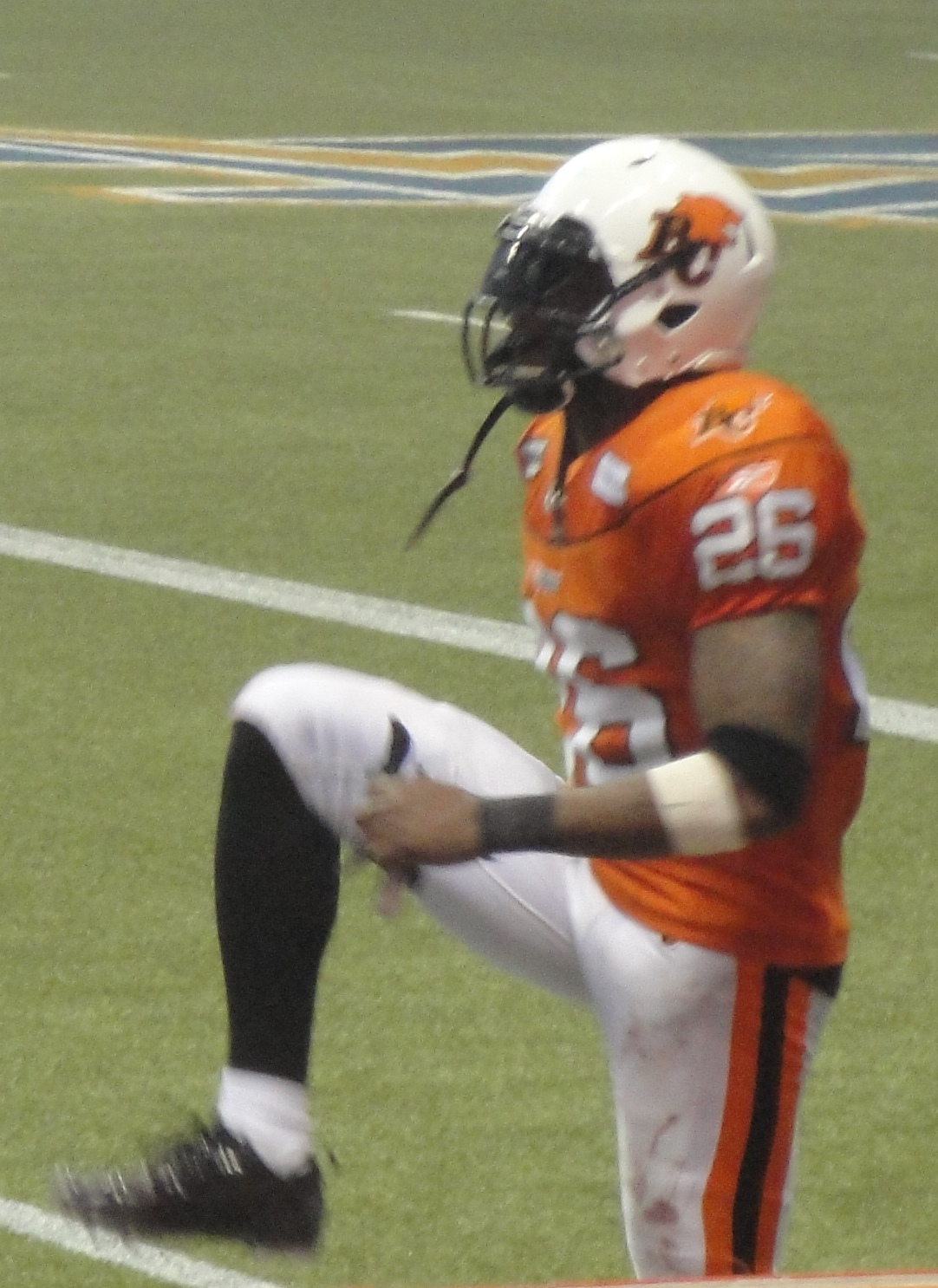
- Reddick warming up during the 99th Grey Cup

No. 26
- Position: Defensive back

Personal information
- Born: December 26, 1985 (age 40); Fort Lauderdale, Florida, U.S.
- Listed height: 6 ft 0 in (1.83 m)
- Listed weight: 205 lb (93 kg)

Career information
- College: Miami

Career history
- 2010–2013: BC Lions

Awards and highlights
- Grey Cup champion (2011)
- Stats at CFL.ca (archive)

Anthony Reddick (born December 26, 1985) is an American former professional football defensive back who played for the BC Lions of the Canadian Football League (CFL). Reddick signed as a free agent with the Lions on April 27, 2010. He played college football for the Miami Hurricanes. In a 2006 brawl, Reddick swung his helmet as a weapon at players on the opposing team. He was one of 31 players suspended for the incident.

After three seasons with the Lions, Reddick was released on March 26, 2013.
