= Elissa Slotkin =

American politician (born 1976)

- Official portrait, 2025

United States Senator from Michigan
- Incumbent
- Assumed office January 3, 2025 Serving with Gary Peters
- Preceded by: Debbie Stabenow

Member of the U.S. House of Representatives from Michigan
- In office January 3, 2019 – January 3, 2025
- Preceded by: Mike Bishop
- Succeeded by: Tom Barrett
- Constituency: 8th district (2019–2023); 7th district (2023–2025)

Acting Assistant Secretary of Defense for International Security Affairs
- In office January 15, 2015 – January 20, 2017
- President: Barack Obama
- Preceded by: Derek Chollet
- Succeeded by: Kenneth Handelman (acting)

Personal details
- Born: Elissa Blair Slotkin; July 10, 1976 (age 50) New York City, U.S.
- Party: Democratic
- Spouse: David Moore (m. 2010; div. 2023)
- Education: Cornell University (BA); Columbia University (MIA)
- Awards: Secretary of Defense Medal for Outstanding Public Service
- Website: Senate website; Campaign website

Elissa Blair Slotkin (/ˈslɒtkɪn/ SLOT-kin; born July 10, 1976) is an American politician and former Department of Defense official serving since 2025 as the junior United States senator from Michigan. A member of the Democratic Party, she served in the United States House of Representatives from 2019 to 2025.

Slotkin was a Central Intelligence Agency (CIA) analyst and Department of Defense (DoD) official, ending her career there as the acting Assistant Secretary of Defense for International Security Affairs. In 2018, she was elected to the U.S. House of Representatives, representing Michigan's 8th congressional district.

Slotkin was elected to the Senate in 2024, defeating Republican nominee Mike Rogers in a close race. She became the second female senator from Michigan after Debbie Stabenow. She is expected to become Michigan's senior senator when Gary Peters retires in 2027.

== Early life and education ==
Elissa Slotkin was born on July 10, 1976, in New York City, the daughter of Judith (née Spitz) Slotkin and Curt Slotkin. She spent her early life on a farm in Holly, Michigan. She attended Cranbrook Kingswood School in Bloomfield Hills. Her family farm was part of Hygrade Meat Company, founded by her great-grandfather Samuel Slotkin, who emigrated from Minsk in 1900. Hygrade was the original company behind Ball Park Franks, which is now owned by Tyson Foods. Judith and Curt divorced, and Judith came out as gay in 1986. Slotkin and her brother moved in with their mother. Their home was a gathering place for Detroit's covert but vibrant LGBTQ+ community. Her father was a longtime Republican and Ronald Reagan supporter whose worldview she agreed with during her childhood. Slotkin has said that she became a Democrat because of the Reagan administration's indifference to the widespread suffering of those with AIDS, which greatly affected her.

Slotkin attended the College of Agriculture and Life Sciences school at Cornell University, where in 1998 she earned a Bachelor of Arts in rural sociology.

In 2003, Slotkin earned a master of international affairs from Columbia University's School of International and Public Affairs.

== Early career ==
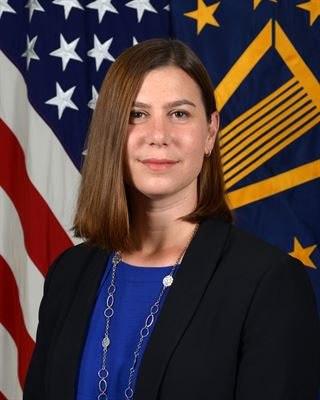
Slotkin as Assistant Secretary of Defense for International Security Affairs

Slotkin joined the Central Intelligence Agency in 2002, following the September 11 attacks. Fluent in Arabic and Swahili, she served three tours in Iraq alongside the military as a CIA analyst. She described her role as an expert on Iraqi Shia militias. During the George W. Bush administration, she worked on the Iraq portfolio for the National Security Council. During Barack Obama's presidency, she worked for the State Department and the Department of Defense. From 2015 to 2017, Slotkin was acting Assistant Secretary of Defense for International Security Affairs, where one of her responsibilities was securing Israel's Qualitative Military Edge.

After leaving the Defense Department in January 2017, Slotkin moved back to her family's farm in Holly, Michigan, where she set up a consulting business.

== U.S. House of Representatives ==
=== Elections ===
==== 2018 ====
In July 2017, Slotkin announced her candidacy for Michigan's 8th congressional district. She said she was motivated to challenge two-term Republican incumbent Mike Bishop when she saw him smile at a White House celebration after he and House Republicans voted to repeal the Affordable Care Act. On August 7, Slotkin defeated Michigan State University criminal justice professor Christopher Smith in the Democratic primary with 70.7% of the vote.

In November 2018, Slotkin defeated Bishop with 50.6% of the vote. She is the first Democrat to represent Michigan's 8th district since 2001, when Debbie Stabenow gave up the seat to run for the U. S. Senate.

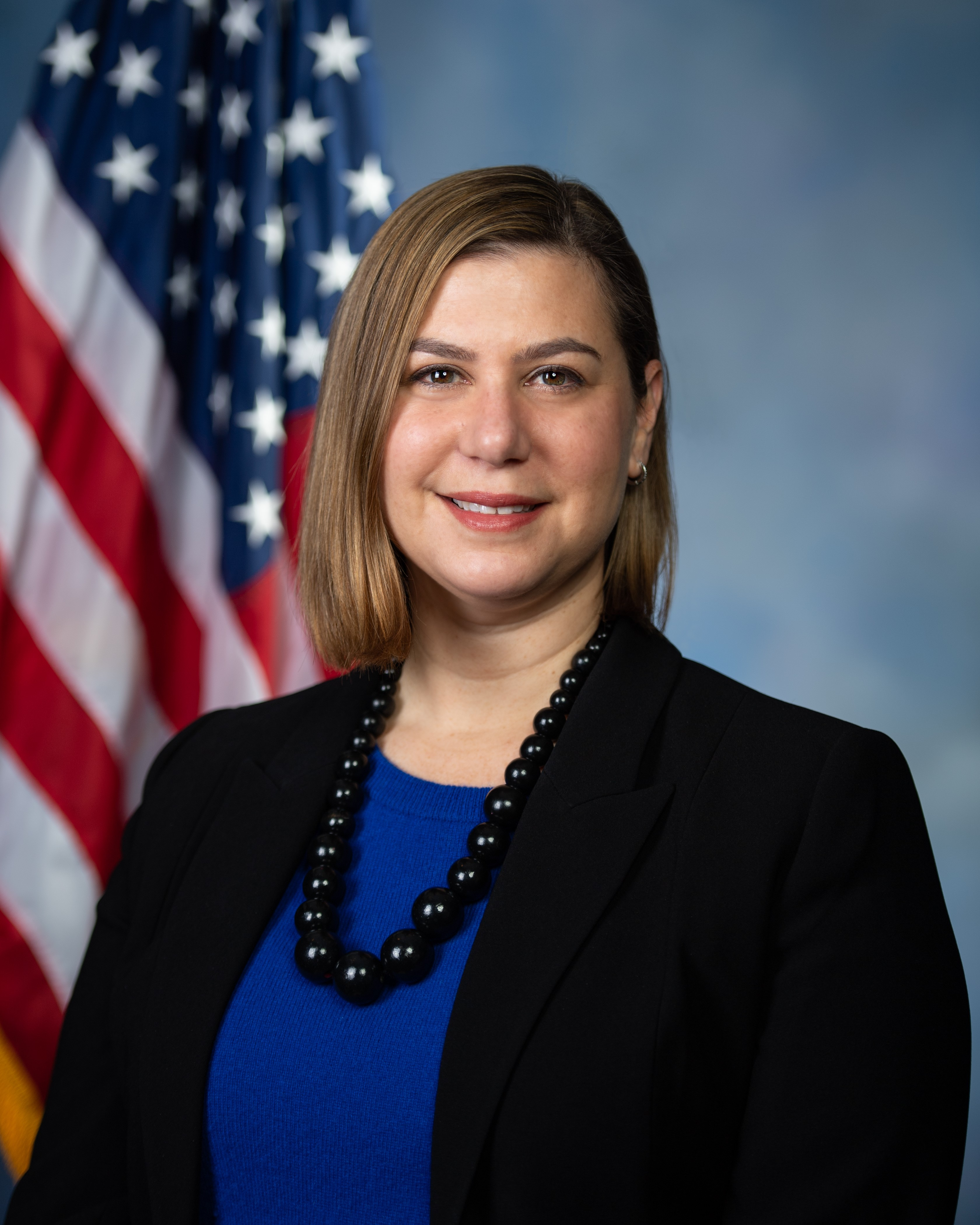
Slotkin's official congressional portrait for the 116th United States Congress

==== 2020 ====
Slotkin was reelected with 50.9% of the vote, defeating Republican Paul Junge.

At a Jewish Democratic conference in July 2019, Slotkin accused the Republican Party of using opposition to antisemitism as a strategy to bring the Jewish community into their fold. She argued that Republicans were not primarily seeking Jewish votes, because "we are a relatively small community", but rather aiming to "sway" the community's donors. Republican Jewish leadership criticized her remarks. In 2019, Slotkin held several town halls about her decision to vote in favor of President Donald Trump's impeachment. The meetings drew hundreds of protesters and received nationwide media coverage.

Slotkin adapted to campaigning during the COVID-19 pandemic by holding campaign events both virtually and socially distanced with contactless door canvassing and by running advertisements on gasoline pumps.

==== 2022 ====
Due to redistricting, Slotkin's district was renumbered as the 7th district. She defeated Republican nominee Tom Barrett with 51.5% of the vote to Barrett's 46.5%. The general election was the most expensive U.S. House race of 2022, with Slotkin raising $9.8 million.

Slotkin criticized Barrett's stance on abortion, specifically his statement that he is "100% pro-life, no exceptions". She also criticized his multiple votes against incentives for a new General Motors electric vehicle battery plant in Delta Township. After the election and before her February 2023 divorce, Slotkin moved back to her family farm in Holly, in Michigan's 9th congressional district.

Slotkin attributed her 2022 victory to "losing better" in the district's Republican-leaning areas. She described her district as "pro-life" and said that, while she ran one pro-choice ad, she ran four on the economy.

=== Tenure ===
Upon her election in 2018, Slotkin and fellow moderate freshmen women from competitive districts with national security backgrounds Abigail Spanberger, Mikie Sherrill, Elaine Luria, and Chrissy Houlahan, were described as a "mod squad" counterweight to the progressive "Squad".

In September 2019, Slotkin and six other freshman House Democrats wrote an opinion piece in The Washington Post calling for an impeachment inquiry into President Trump. Its publication led to widespread Democratic support for an impeachment inquiry. Slotkin voted to impeach Trump in both his first and second impeachments.

=== Committee assignments ===
- Committee on Armed Services
  - Subcommittee on Intelligence, Emerging Threats and Capabilities
  - Subcommittee on Readiness (vice chair)
- Committee on Homeland Security
  - Subcommittee on Counterterrorism and Intelligence (chair)
  - Subcommittee on Cybersecurity and Infrastructure Protection
- Committee on Veterans' Affairs
  - Subcommittee on Disability Assistance and Memorial Affairs

=== Caucus memberships ===
- Black Maternal Health Caucus
- Congressional Ukraine Caucus
- New Democrat Coalition
- Problem Solvers Caucus
- Rare Disease Caucus

== U.S. Senate ==
=== Elections ===
==== 2024 ====
On February 27, 2023, Slotkin announced her candidacy in the 2024 Michigan U.S. Senate election after Debbie Stabenow announced that she would vacate the seat. She won the Democratic primary on August 6, 2024, with 76% of the vote, and defeated Republican nominee Mike Rogers in the general election, outperforming the top of the ticket.

=== Tenure ===
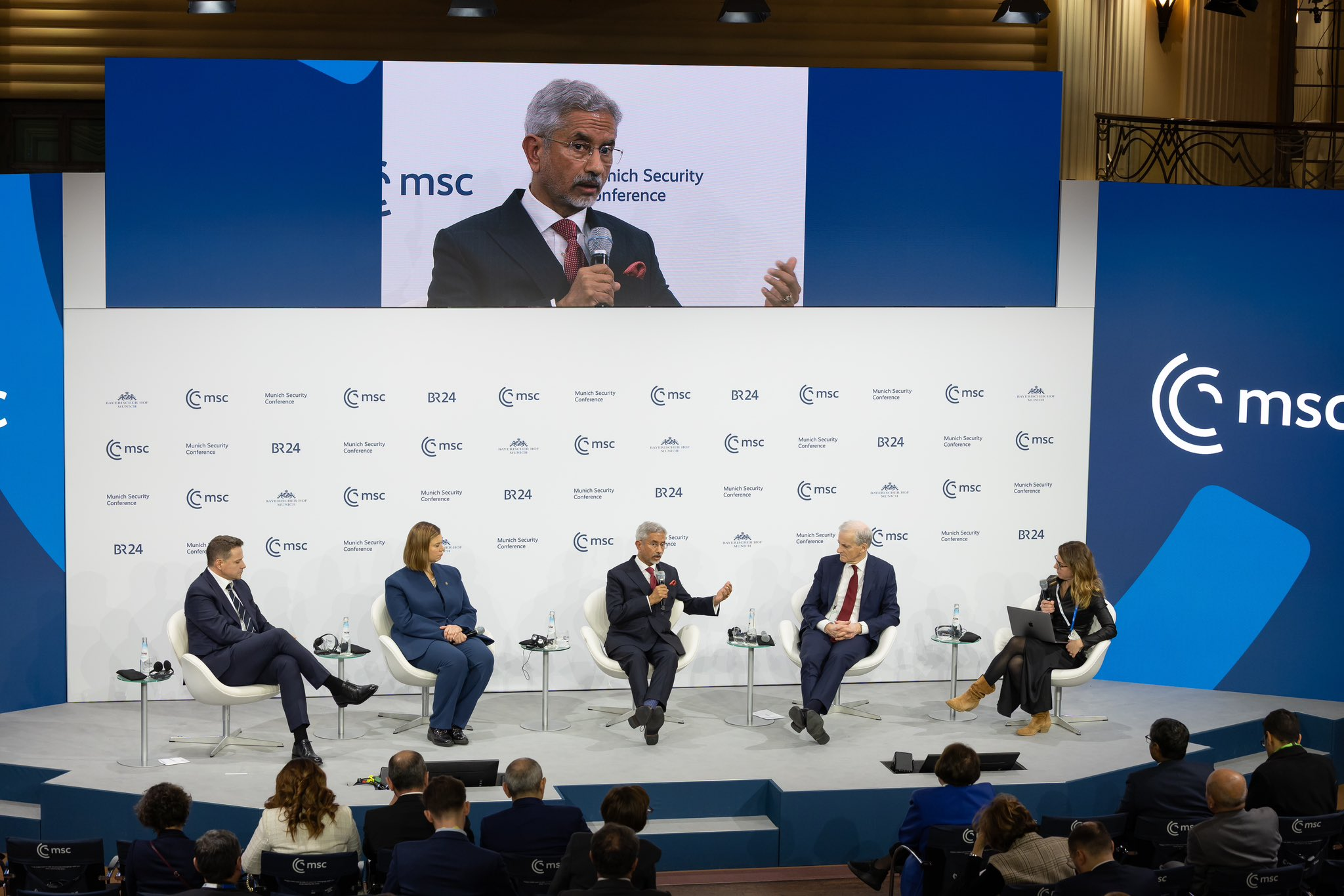
Slotkin, Indian Foreign Minister S. Jaishankar and Norwegian Prime Minister Jonas Gahr Støre at the Munich Security Conference, February 15, 2025

Early in 2025, Slotkin was one of 12 Senate Democrats who joined all Republicans to vote for the Laken Riley Act. After Trump's 2025 State of the Union address, she gave the official Democratic response. She called Trump's economic policies reckless, accused him of favoring billionaires at the expense of ordinary Americans, warned of rising costs and increased national debt, and said President Ronald Reagan would be "rolling in his grave" if he saw Trump cozying up to Vladimir Putin.

Slotkin was one of seven Senate Democrats who voted to confirm Kristi Noem as Secretary of Homeland Security.

Slotkin called for waiting for intelligence to assess the effects of the June 2025 bombing of Iran, and on June 28, after receiving the Senate briefing on the attack, gave her rationale in more detail in an interview.

In June 2025, Slotkin presented an "economic war plan" at the Center for American Progress, arguing that the decline of the middle class was America's greatest security threat and that Democrats needed to get back their "alpha energy". In September, she spoke at the Council on Foreign Relations, calling for a focus on middle-class economics and arguing that national security strategy must "first, protect U.S. citizens, the homeland, and our way of life. And second, advance American prosperity."

In October, Slotkin spoke at the Brookings Institution and said President Trump's actions were following an "authoritarian playbook". In November, she was one of six Democratic lawmakers to be part of a video telling service members they can refuse illegal orders. Trump called those in the video, including Slotkin, traitors who should be charged with sedition punishable by death, and shared a social media post calling for them to be hanged. Later that month, Slotkin's home received a bomb threat. In January 2026, Slotkin said she was under federal investigation due to the video.

In November 2026, Slotkin announced in a joint press conference with Bernie Sanders that she would not support Chuck Schumer for Senate Minority Leader, citing his age and lack of a clear plan. While she initially declined to endorse Chris Van Hollen for the position, saying she would like to see the whole field, she endorsed him on November 19.

=== Committee assignments ===
- Committee on Agriculture, Nutrition, and Forestry
  - Subcommittee on Commodities, Derivatives, Risk Management, and Trade
  - Subcommittee on Livestock, Dairy, Poultry, and Food Safety (Ranking Member)
- Committee on Armed Services
  - Subcommittee on Airland
  - Subcommittee on Cybersecurity
  - Subcommittee on Emerging Threats and Capabilities (Ranking Member)
- Committee on Homeland Security and Governmental Affairs
  - Permanent Subcommittee on Investigations
  - Subcommittee on Border Management, Federal Workforce, and Regulatory Affairs
  - Subcommittee on Disaster Management, District of Columbia, and Census
- Committee on Veterans' Affairs

== Political positions ==
Slotkin has been described as a moderate Democrat. According to GovTrack's 2022 scorecard, she was the fifth-most conservative House Democrat. She was ranked among the most bipartisan members of the House.

=== Abortion ===
In 2024, Slotkin said she supported federal legislation to codify the abortion rights established in Roe v. Wade. She was endorsed by pro-choice organizations Reproductive Freedom for All and Planned Parenthood Action Fund during her 2024 race for U.S. Senate.

=== Campaign finance policy ===
In 2022, Slotkin co-sponsored the Ban Corporate PACs Act, which, if enacted, would prevent corporations from operating a political action committee.

=== Criminal justice ===
Following the murder of George Floyd in Minneapolis, Minnesota, on May 25, 2020, Slotkin co-sponsored and voted for the George Floyd Justice in Policing Act of 2020. She voted in favor of the bill again in 2021. Slotkin voted for a bill to overturn DC criminal code modernization which was signed into law by Biden.

Slotkin opposes abolishing the death penalty. She has said it should be used in rare cases.

=== Economic policy ===
During the COVID-19 pandemic in the United States, Slotkin supported the bipartisan CARES Act relief package, which passed in March 2020. In May 2020, she voted for the HEROES Act, a $3 trillion stimulus package. In November 2021, she voted for the Build Back Better Act.

In August 2022, Slotkin voted for the Inflation Reduction Act. In May 2025, she was the only Senate Democrat to vote for a bill that would prevent California from banning the sale of gasoline-powered vehicles by 2035. She said she had a "special responsibility" to stand up for over 1 million Michiganders employed by the auto industry.

=== Foreign policy ===
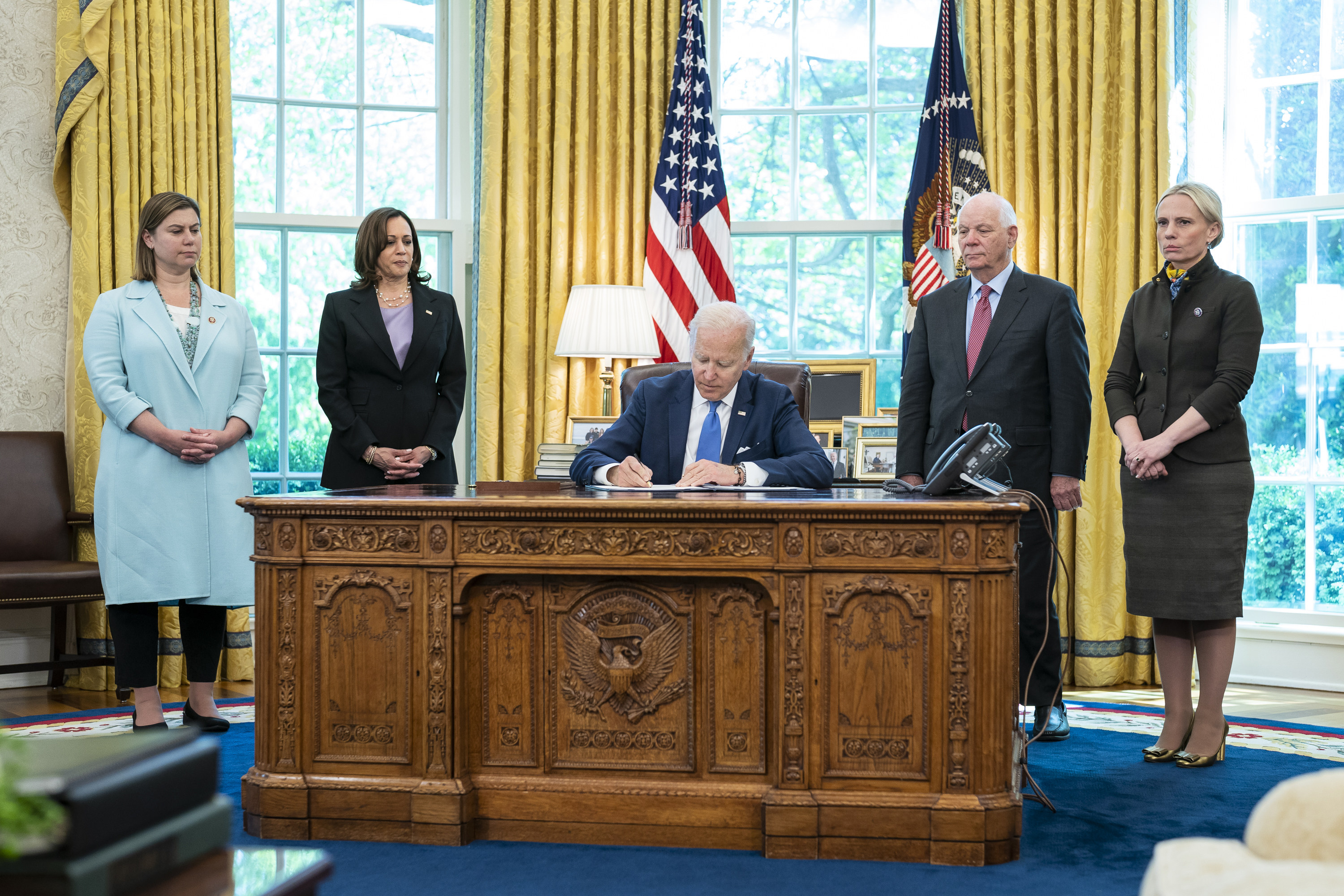
Slotkin joins President Biden, Rep. Spartz, Vice President Harris, and Senator Cardin for the signing of the Ukraine Democracy Defense Lend-Lease Act of 2022. May 2022

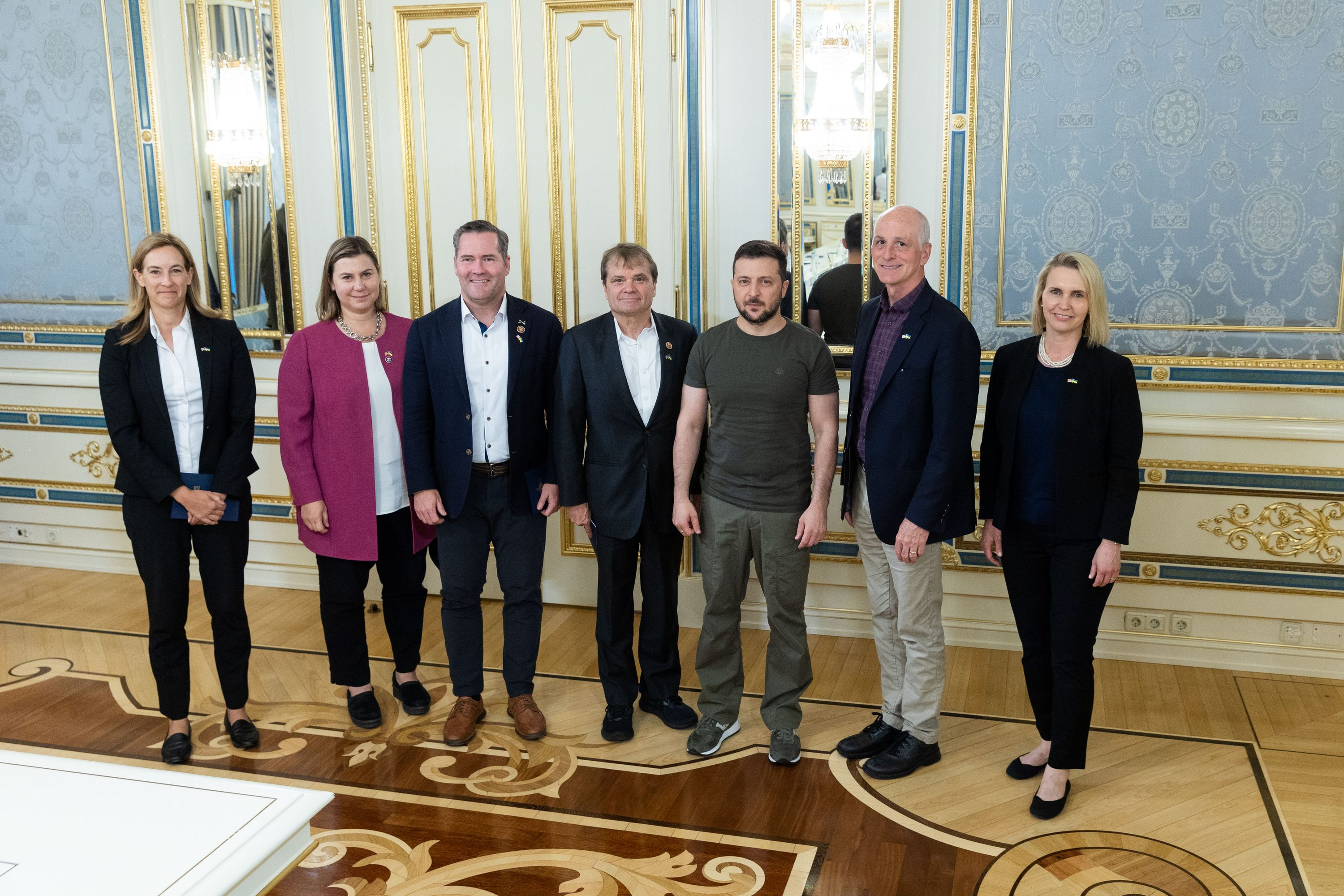
Slotkin with Ukrainian President Volodymyr Zelenskyy in Kyiv, Ukraine, July 23, 2022

Slotkin is one of five Democratic House members who voted against an amendment to prohibit support to and participation in the Saudi-led coalition's military operations against the Houthis in Yemen. She was the main sponsor of the 2020 Iran War Powers Resolution, which sought to restrict President Donald Trump's ability to commit the U.S. to a war with Iran without a Congressional declaration of war. Slotkin voted against H.Con.Res. 21, which directed President Joe Biden to remove U.S. troops from Syria within 180 days.

==== Israel–Palestine conflict ====
Slotkin condemned Representative Rashida Tlaib for using the phrase "from the river to the sea".

Slotkin voted against the 2023 funding bill to Israel. She criticized the House bill for requiring domestic spending cuts to fund foreign emergency aid. She also noted the bill's failure to allocate humanitarian assistance for the "dire" crisis in Gaza and highlighted the exclusion of aid to Ukraine and Taiwan.

In January 2024, Slotkin signed a letter criticizing South Africa's genocide case against Israel, calling it "grossly unfounded". In April 2024, she voted to send $17 billion in military aid to Israel. In July 2025, Slotkin said blocking offensive weapons "would be a place to look but I'm not going to cut off a blanket next sale on a defensive weapon that comes through, no". In a press release, she wrote, "Had I made it back for the vote yesterday, I would have voted yes to block offensive weapons to Israel based on my concerns over lack of food and medicine getting to civilians in Gaza." She added that she would consider future offensive weapons bills on a case-by-case basis.

=== Gun policy ===
In 2022, Slotkin voted for H.R. 1808, the Assault Weapons Ban of 2022. She also introduced H.R. 6370, the Safe Guns, Safe Kids Act, which would require secure firearm storage in the presence of children. The bill was introduced after the 2021 Oxford High School shooting and passed by the House as part of the Protecting Our Kids Act.

After the 2023 Michigan State University shooting in her district, Slotkin and Senator Ed Markey introduced the Gun Violence Prevention Research Act. The bill would provide $50 million each year for the next five years for research on firearms safety and gun violence prevention by the Centers for Disease Control and Prevention.

=== Health care ===
Slotkin supports the Affordable Care Act. During her 2020 campaign, she said the protection of health care coverage for people with preexisting conditions was the most important issue in her district. She supports allowing Medicare to negotiate with pharmaceutical companies for lower drug prices for those it insures.

Slotkin opposes Medicare for All but supports Pete Buttigieg's so-called "Medicare for All Who Want It" plan. She has criticized Medicare for All, saying that "no one can explain" how to fund it. Instead, she says she is a "big believer" in a Medicare buy-in option available to people of any age.

=== LGBT rights ===
In both the 116th and 117th Congresses, Slotkin received a 100% rating from Human Rights Campaign's (HRC) Congressional Scorecard, which measures "support for equality" among members of Congress based on their voting record. HRC endorsed her in each of her campaigns for the House.

=== Student debt ===
In 2020, during the Trump administration, Slotkin voted against an amendment, supported by 93% of the Democratic caucus, that would provide $10,000 debt relief for student loan borrowers. She also pushed the Department of Education to assist federal employees with student loan payments during the partial government shutdown. Slotkin voted twice against a Republican-led measure that would have overturned the Biden administration's student debt forgiveness initiative. In 2023, the U.S. Supreme Court struck down that initiative.

=== Identity politics ===
After the 2024 presidential election, Slotkin said that identity politics "needs to go the way of the dodo", adding that "people need to be looked at as independent Americans, whatever group they're from, whatever party they may be from."

=== Redistricting ===
At a July 2025 Axios event in Washington, D.C., Slotkin addressed Republican-led mid-decade redistricting efforts in Texas backed by Donald Trump, saying she would not "fight with one arm tied behind my back" if Republicans pursued what she called an aggressive partisan strategy. She added, "If they're going to go nuclear in Texas, I'm going to go nuclear in other places. I don't want to do that, but if they're proposing to rig the game ... we're going to get in that game and fight." Her remarks came amid broader Democratic retaliatory planning and concerns about redistricting nationwide.

=== Immigration ===
On June 6, 2026, Slotkin criticized the SAVE Act, arguing that it would "make it hard for any Democrat in any state to win any election".

== Personal life ==
Slotkin married Dave Moore, a retired Army colonel and Apache helicopter pilot, in 2010. They had met in Baghdad during Slotkin's third tour in Iraq and lived in Holly. The two filed for divorce in 2023. Slotkin had two stepdaughters while married to Moore. She is Jewish.

== Electoral history ==
2024 United States Senate election in Michigan
Party	Candidate	Votes	%	±%
Democratic	Elissa Slotkin	2,706,037	48.67%	−3.59%
Republican	Mike Rogers	2,684,312	48.29%	+2.53%
Natural Law	Doug Dern	41,243	0.70%	N/A
Green	Douglas Marsh	53,838	0.98%	N/A
Libertarian	Joseph Solis-Mullen	56,489	1.04%	N/A
U.S. Taxpayers'	Dave Stein	49,673	0.87%	N/A
Write-in		0	0.00%	
Total votes		5,560,647	100.0%	

Michigan's 7th congressional district, 2022
Party	Candidate	Votes	%
Democratic	Elissa Slotkin (incumbent)	192,809	51.7
Republican	Tom Barrett	172,624	46.3
Libertarian	Leah Dailey	7,275	1.9
Total votes		372,708	100.0

Michigan's 8th congressional district, 2020
Party	Candidate	Votes	%
Democratic	Elissa Slotkin (incumbent)	217,929	50.9
Republican	Paul Junge	202,519	47.3
Libertarian	Joe Hartman	7,896	1.8
Total votes		428,344	98

Michigan's 8th congressional district, 2018
Party	Candidate	Votes	%
Democratic	Elissa Slotkin	172,880	50.6
Republican	Mike Bishop (incumbent)	159,782	46.8
Libertarian	Brian Ellison	6,302	1.8
U.S. Taxpayers'	David Lillis	2,629	0.8
Total votes		341,593	100.0
Democratic gain from Republican			

Michigan Democratic primary results, 2018
Party	Candidate	Votes	%
Democratic	Elissa Slotkin	57,819	70.7
Democratic	Christopher E. Smith	23,996	29.3
Total votes		81,815	100.0

== See also ==
- List of Jewish members of the United States Congress
- List of Jewish American politicians
- Women in the United States House of Representatives

U.S. House of Representatives
Preceded by Mike Bishop	Member of the U.S. House of Representatives from Michigan's 8th congressional district 2019–2023	Succeeded by Dan Kildee
Preceded by Tim Walberg	Member of the U.S. House of Representatives from Michigan's 7th congressional district 2023–2025	Succeeded by Tom Barrett
Party political offices
Preceded by Debbie Stabenow	Democratic nominee for U.S. Senator from Michigan (Class 1); 2024	Most recent
Preceded by Katie Britt	Response to the State of the Union address 2025	Succeeded by Abigail Spanberger
U.S. Senate
Preceded by Debbie Stabenow	U.S. Senator (Class 1) from Michigan; 2025–present Served alongside: Gary Peters, Abdul El-Sayed (elect)	Incumbent
U.S. order of precedence (ceremonial)
Preceded by Jim Banks	Order of precedence of the United States as United States Senator	Succeeded by Tim Sheehy
Preceded by John Curtis	United States senators by seniority 91st	Succeeded by Dave McCormick
