= St Mary's School, Calne =

St Mary's School
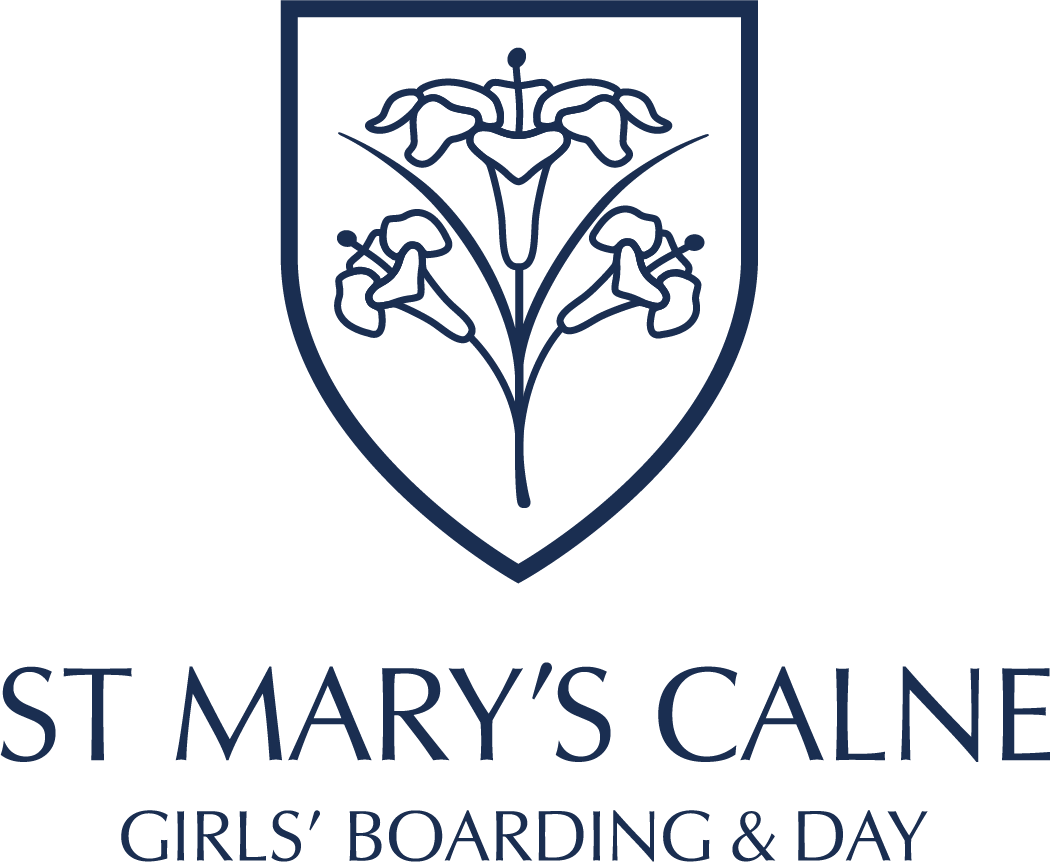

Location
- Curzon Street; Calne, Wiltshire, SN11 0DF; England; 51°26′28″N 2°00′29″W

Information
- Type: Private day and boarding school
- Religious affiliation: Church of England
- Established: 1873
- Founder: Canon John Duncan
- Department for Education URN: 126513 Tables
- Ofsted: Reports
- Head: Anne Wakefield
- Chaplain: Rev. Jonathan Beach
- Staff: 90~
- Gender: Girls
- Age: 11 to 18
- Enrolment: 350~
- Houses: 3 (Junior); 4 (Senior)
- Colours: Navy, Light Blue and White
- Companies: Edmund Rich; Grossteste; Moberly; Osmund; Poore
- Website: www.stmaryscalne.org

St Mary's School is a private day and boarding school in Calne, Wiltshire, England, for girls aged 11 to 18. The school is a registered charity.

In 2023, the school's A Level results ranked third in the UK and joint second in the south-west of England.

== History ==
St Mary's was founded in 1873 by Canon John Duncan, Vicar of Calne, who worked for over thirty years to establish it as an 'outstanding' girls' school.

Research for her 2006 novel Wicked! led author Jilly Cooper to interview former pupils.

== Performance ==
In the 2017 ISI report, the school received a double 'excellent' – the highest possible grade.

In figures published in January 2017 by the Department for Education (DfE) regarding 2016 A Level results, St Mary's Calne got the top score for its 'value added' – that is, how much progress students who studied A Levels made between the end of Key Stage 4 and the end of their A Level studies, compared to similar students across England. St Mary's Calne scored 'well above the national average', to be in the top 4% of schools in England with this value added score.

== Houses and Companies ==
The school is divided into five companies, named after bishops with local connections: Edmund Rich, Grossetête, Moberly, Osmund, and Poore. Each girl remains in the same company throughout her time at the school. The companies are similar to houses in other independent schools, except that they have nothing to do with the house a girl sleeps in. The companies compete in sport, drama, music, and other activities such as quizzes, public speaking, and maths challenges.

There are seven boarding houses, for each year group from LIV to UVI. The houses are School House, St. Prisca's, St. Cecilia's, Gibbins, Joyce Walters, Florence Dyas, and Helen Wright. The newest house is Florence Dyas, the LVI house, which was opened in September 2014.

== Facilities ==
Around 80% of the girls board, and day girls can sleep over. Between the ages of eleven and fourteen, girls sleep in dormitories in three junior houses, each of which has a housemistress, deputy housemistress, and a day ousemistress. After the age of fourteen, girls have their own single study room in one of four senior houses. In the sixth form, rooms are en-suite.

During a £10.5 million boarding refurbishment programme, the Lower Sixth Form house won the 2016 West of England LABC Building Excellence awards for Best Educational Building. A new multi-million pound sports complex was opened in 2018.

The school has a dining room, 12,000-book library, chapel, and theatre.

== Headmistresses ==
- Miss Richardson (Note: Richardson's and Leeson's forenames are not known) (1873–1876)
- Louisa Jones (1876–1883)
- Charlotte Pells (1883–1885)
- Miss Leeson (1885–1888)
- Florence Dyas (1888–1911)
- Rachel Donaldson (1911–1915)
- Marcia Matthews (1915–1945)
- Joyce Field (1945–1946)
- Elizabeth Gibbins (1946–1972)
- Joyce Walters (1972–1985)
- Delscey Burns (1985–1996)
- Carolyn Shaw (1996–2003)
- Helen Wright (2003–2012)
- Felicia Kirk (2012–2023)
- Anne Wakefield (2024–present)

== Notable alumnae ==
- Laura Bechtolsheimer – gold medallist at the 2012 Summer Olympics
- Nicola LeFanu – composer, academic, lecturer and director
- Arabella Dorman – War Artist and portrait painter
- Lucy Hughes-Hallett – author, winner of the 2013 Samuel Johnson Prize for non-fiction
- Lady Emma Herbert – circus trapeze artist and stuntwoman
- April FitzLyon – biographer and translator
- Etelka Leadlay – conservationist
- Sara Maitland – author
- Elizabeth Moir – educationalist
- Christina Smith (property developer) – businesswoman
- Belinda Stewart-Wilson – actress
- Tara Sutton – war correspondent

== Bibliography ==
- Kay Stedmond (1986). St Mary's School Calne 1873–1986. B. A. Hathaway. ISBN 0-948640-10-3.
