= Christina Smith (property developer) =

Covent Garden property developer (1934–2022)

Christina Smith OBE
- Born: Christina Anne Smith; 27 March 1934; Marylebone, London
- Died: 11 March 2022 (aged 87); Covent Garden, London
- Education: St Mary's School, Calne
- Occupations: Property developer, entrepreneur, philanthropist
- Known for: Preserving the historic buildings of Covent Garden

Christina Anne Smith (27 March 1934 – 11 March 2022) was a property developer and entrepreneur, who became known as the 'queen of Covent Garden', a historic part of central London, as a result of becoming the area's largest private landlord. She started as a shop owner and ended up running a multi-million pound property empire, which supported her eclectic collection of retail and catering outlets around Covent Garden. Eccentric in her approach, she successfully campaigned to preserve the historic market buildings that make up the centre of the former market of Covent Garden. She became a significant supporter of the arts, architecture and charitable causes.

== Early years ==
Smith was born in 1934 at Welbeck Hospital, in Marylebone, just over a mile from Covent Garden. Her father was Ronald Smith, who worked as the doctor for Rugby School, and her mother was Maud (née Campbell). Her mother's family was of Scottish heritage, but Maud Smith was Finnish, which later played some influence on Christina's approach to style. She went to St Mary's School, Calne until she was 17 years old.

After completing school, Smith took on a variety of short term jobs, before landing a role as personal assistant to Sir Terence Conran. From her Finnish background, Smith was credited with introducing Conran to the duvet, which Conran's Habitat stores successfully marketed to British consumers. Smith and Conran were to become close, at a time when his marriage with Dame Shirley Conran was starting to fall apart. There was a view that Smith was likely to become Conran's future spouse, a suspicion shared by the then incumbent. In the circumstances Smith elected to remove herself from London, and went travelling to various countries in Asia and the Americas. While there she accumulated samples of local products and sent them back to London. This became the start of her product inventory. When Smith returned to London, she did not become Conran's wife, instead she was to become his landlord some 20 years later.

== Career as businesswoman ==
Her first step as a businesswoman in her own right was as a wholesaler, when she established Goods and Chattels at 26 Neal Street in 1961 in a former potato warehouse. She noticed the lease was available and borrowed money from her father to set up the business. Over time, she made deals to obtain freehold, leasehold and rental arrangements on other properties in the vicinity, as well as renting out properties to other companies. This included opening her first retail shop in 1972, Neal Street East shop, an emporium of international trinkets and decorative pieces. This shop was nearly opposite Goods and Chattels, also a former warehouse and redesigned by Max Clendinning. She then opened Smith's Restaurant in Earlham Street, and which had an art gallery on the ground floor, Smith's Gallery. This was the venue for David Hockney's first public exhibition. The gallery moved and the site later became the Belgian themed Belgo restaurant, but for 20 years Smith felt she had become the janitor to the building.

In 1974 the fruit and vegetable market moved from Covent Garden to Nine Elms, Vauxhall, and the old market area became increasingly run down. The original proposals for the area involved the demolition of the historic market buildings and surrounding warehouses, to make way for office accommodation, a hotel, and a conference centre. Smith was one of the campaigners to successfully argue the case for preserving the buildings and turning them into retail and hospitality venues.

== Supported organisations ==
Smith supported a range of organisations and charities, most had some connection to Covent Garden. She was an art collector, with Hockney, Matisse and Maggi Hambling featuring in her personal collection.

She was a founder trustee of the Seven Dials Trust which aims to protect the historic fabric of the buildings near Seven Dials, London. She was a council member of the Architectural Association School of Architecture, its vice-president in 2012-13, and gave the school substantial donations. She was a supporter of the Women's Playhouse Trust, the Contemporary Arts Society and the Architecture Club.. She was heavily involved, along with Dame Rosemary Squire, with the establishment of the Ambassador Theatre Group, which bought the Duke of York's Theatre and became the landlord of the Donmar Warehouse, the latter being a non-profit theatre located in Earlham Street, with Sir Sam Mendes as artistic director. She helped to finance the Old Vic's relaunched version of Carmen Jones in 1991. Squire said that Smith would have wanted to be an actor in other circumstances.

== Personal life and death ==
Squire described her as being in "full technicolour. I think her red lips and her red clothes were emblematic of how she was as a person." She was described as an acquired taste, and sometimes frustrating to work with: she wanted things done her way. She said of herself: "I mean I'm sort of person who is a failed perfectionist, so that's difficult to work with, I think, because nothing ever is perfect." She never married.

Christina Smith died at her home in Covent Garden on 11 March 2022, from complications related to Alzheimer's disease, aged 87. As of 2026 Smith's charitable foundation continues to operate.

== Recognition ==
Smith was awarded an OBE in 2013.
