= Chris Smith (American academic) =

American academic

- Born: 1958 (age 67–68)
- Political party: Democratic

Christopher E. Smith (born 1958) is an American legal academic who is a specialist in constitutional rights and correctional law. He succeeded lawyer and political activist Zolton Ferency as Michigan State University's faculty specialist on constitutional rights in criminal justice. He taught courses on criminal justice, law, and public policy in Michigan State's School of Criminal Justice from 1994 to 2025. He was inducted into the School's Wall of Fame in 2021.

== Biography ==
After growing up in Michigan, Smith earned his bachelor's degree from Harvard University before earning a master's degree at the University of Bristol, a J.D. degree at the University of Tennessee, and a Ph.D. in political science from the University of Connecticut. He joined Michigan State University's faculty in 1994 after previously teaching political science at the University of Akron and the University of Connecticut-Hartford.

== Work ==
Smith has written dozens of books focusing on American government, constitutional law, criminal justice, and the U.S. Supreme Court. As the author of more than 100 articles for both scholarly and public audiences, his work has appeared in The Atlantic, American Journal of Criminal Justice, and Political Research Quarterly.

== Political career ==
In 2018, Smith was a candidate for the US House from the MI-08 district. He was defeated in the Democratic primary by Elissa Slotkin, who also won the general election. He later led the Michigan Coalition to Prevent Gun Violence as the organization's board chairperson and interim executive director.
