= Chris Smith (biologist) =

- Born: Christopher Irwin Smith
- Occupation(s): Associate Professor of Biology; Department Chair
- Known for: Study of yucca moths and yucca trees
- Notable work: Coevolution of Joshua trees and their Pollinators

Chris Smith is an associate professor of biology at Willamette University in Salem, Oregon, United States. In 2013 he received a grant for his work studying the relationship between yucca moths and yucca trees.

== Background ==
In 2013, Smith received a National Science Foundation CAREER award of $850,000 for his work studying the co-evolution of yucca trees and their pollinators, yucca moths. He had the distinction of being the university's first faculty member to receive a CAREER award.

With Emily Drew, Smith also teaches the interdisciplinary course "Race, Racism, and Human Genetics", which examines how scientific endeavors had been affected by racial outlooks. The course originated from a discussion Smith and Drew had on the topic in 2012.

== Study of yucca and joshua trees ==
Smith has studied the northward migration of yucca and joshua trees, and the possible hybridization of the Eastern and Western varieties, either of which may be related to climate change.

== Challenging views on race ==
Smith is an advocate for the dismantling of racist pseudoscientific beliefs. On October 8, 2012, he and fellow Willamette associate professor Emily Drew, an anti-racism workshop facilitator, led a discussion on the misrepresentation of race and racial differences, presented at the Bagdad Theater and Pub in Portland, Oregon.
