= Chris Smith (safety, born 1985) =

American gridiron football player (born 1985)

No. 39
- Position: Safety

Personal information
- Born: June 3, 1985 (age 41); Gainesville, Florida, U.S.
- Listed height: 5 ft 11 in (1.80 m)
- Listed weight: 215 lb (98 kg)

Career information
- High school: Gainesville
- College: Florida International
- NFL draft: 2007: undrafted

Career history
- 2007: Philadelphia Eagles*
- 2008: Montreal Alouettes
- * Offseason or practice squad member only
- Stats at CFL.ca

Chris Smith (born June 3, 1985) is an American former professional football player who was a safety for the Montreal Alouettes in the Canadian Football League (CFL).

== Early life ==
Smith attended Gainesville High School, where he earned all-state honors as a senior in football and also lettered in baseball and basketball. Smith played college football for Florida International University from 2003 to 2006, where he studied criminal justice. He finished college with 178 tackles and 12 tackles for a loss, a sack and one interception. Smith was one of two players who were dismissed from the Golden Panthers for their involvement in the FIU–Miami football brawl that occurred on October 14, 2006, in a game against Miami Hurricanes football in what had been intended as the first of annual cross-town series between the Miami teams.

== Professional career ==
Smith went undrafted in the 2007 NFL draft but was signed as a free agent with the Philadelphia Eagles on April 30, 2007, and played in the pre-season but was ultimately released on August 27.

In June 2008, the Montreal Alouettes signed Smith to the practice roster. On July 31, 2008, he played in his first regular season game and started at safety the following week. He ultimately played in nine games of the 2008 CFL season before returning to the practice roster at the end of the year.
