= 2012 United States Senate elections =

- November 6, 2012
- Class 1

33 of the 100 seats in the United States Senate 51 seats needed for a majority
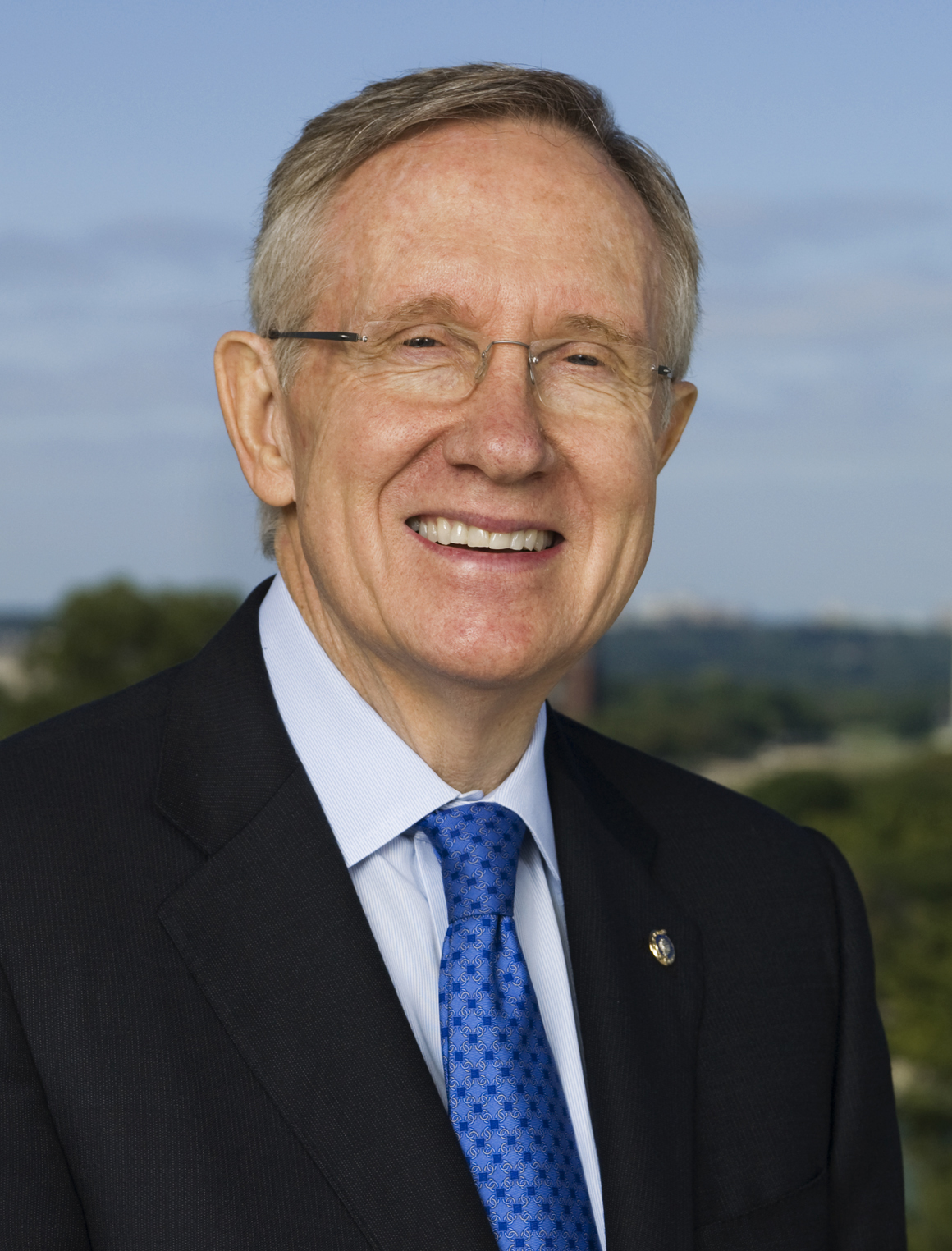

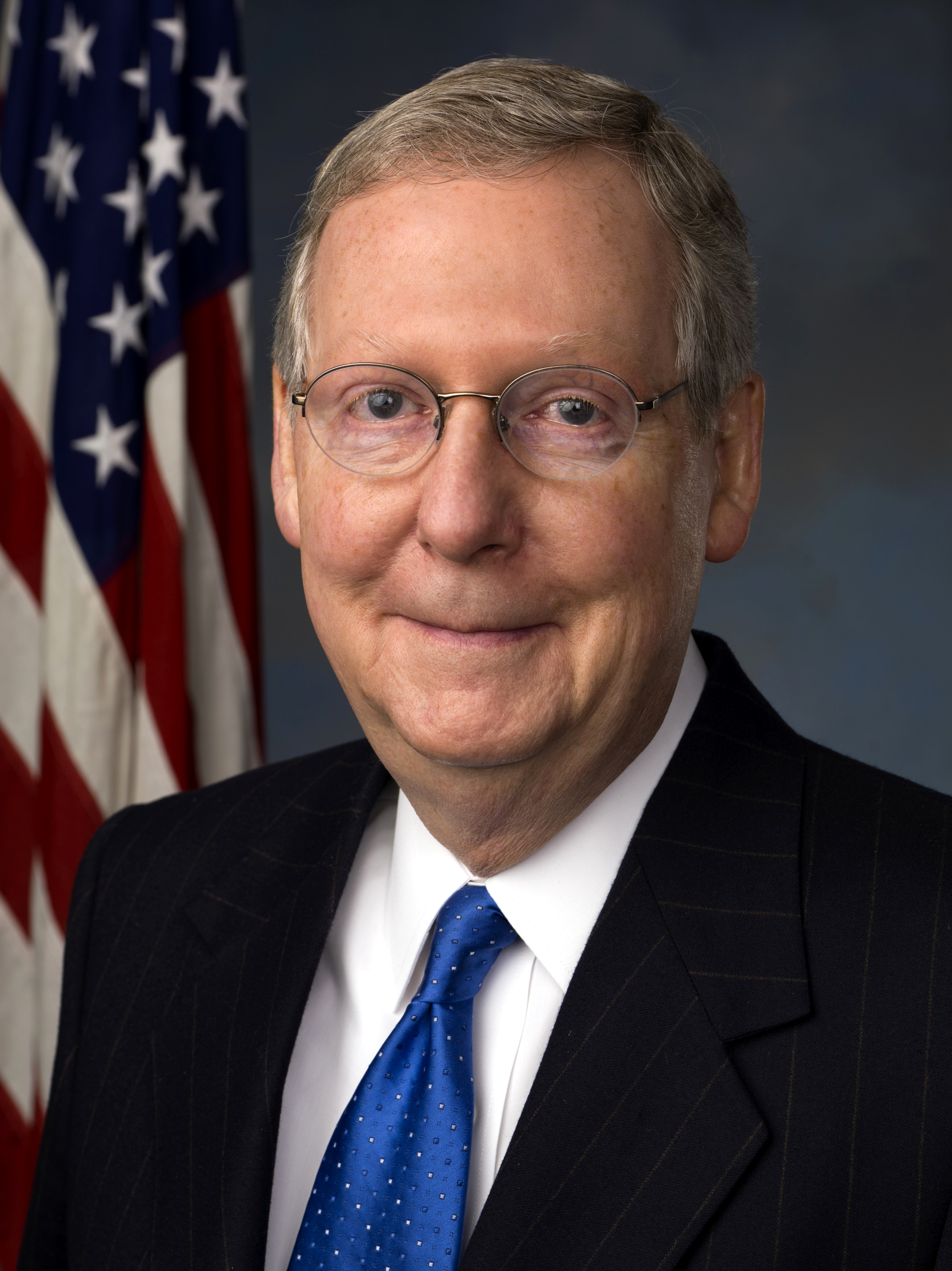
| | Majority party | Minority party |
|---|---|---|
| Leader | Harry Reid | Mitch McConnell |
| Party | Democratic | Republican |
| Leader's seat | Nevada | Kentucky |
| Seats before | 51 | 47 |
| Seats after | 53 | 45 |
| Seat change | ▲2 | ▼2 |
| Popular vote | 49,988,282 | 39,128,301 |
| Percentage | 53.43% | 41.82% |
| Seats up | 21 | 10 |
| Races won | 23 | 8 |
| | Third party |
| Party | Independent |
| Seats before | 2 (Note: Although Joe Lieberman (CT) was elected in 2006 on the Connecticut for Lieberman ticket, most sources (including himself) refer to him as an independent Democrat and he is included here as an independent.) |
| Seats after | 2 (Note: Both independent senators—Bernie Sanders (VT) and Angus King (ME)—caucused with the Democratic Party.) |
| Seat change | Steady |
| Popular vote | 961,284 |
| Percentage | 1.03% |
| Seats up | 2 |
| Races won | 2 |
- Results of the elections: Democratic gain Republican gain Independent gain Democratic hold Republican hold Independent hold No election
Majority Leader before election
Harry Reid
Democratic
Elected Majority Leader
Harry Reid
Democratic

The 2012 United States Senate elections were held on November 6, 2012, with 33 of the 100 seats in the Senate, all Class 1 seats, being contested in regular elections whose winners would serve 6-year terms beginning on January 3, 2013, with the 113th Congress. Democrats had 21 seats up for election, plus 1 independent, and 1 independent Democrat, while the Republicans only had ten seats up for election. The presidential election, elections to the House of Representatives, elections for governors in 14 states and territories, and many state and local elections were also held on the same day.

The Democrats gained Republican-held seats in Massachusetts and Indiana and one from an Independent Democrat in Connecticut, leaving them with a total of 53 seats. Additionally, they held open seats in Hawaii, New Mexico, North Dakota, Virginia, and Wisconsin. The Republicans, despite losing 2 of their seats, picked an open seat in Nebraska up and retained open seats in Arizona and Texas, ending with a total of 45 seats. The Independents retained a seat in Vermont and gained an additional seat from the Republicans in Maine, bringing their total to 2 seats. Both Independents would caucus with the Democrats, forming a majority caucus with a combined total of 55 seats.

As of 2026, this was the last time the Democrats won seats in Florida, Indiana, Missouri, and North Dakota. It was also the last time the Republican Party won a seat in Nevada. The Democrats would not win control of the Senate again until 2020 (Note: After the 2020 elections, the Senate was split 50-50 and a Democratic vice president was elected to break ties, giving Democrats a technical majority in the Senate.). Democrats alone would not win an outright majority again until 2026.

Additionally, this was the first time since 1936 that a two-term Democratic presidential candidate had Senate coattails on both occasions. (Note: Although Franklin Roosevelt won third and fourth terms in 1940 and 1944, respectively, he concurrently lost Senate seats on both occasions.) This was also the first time since 1964 (and the last time as of 2026) in which either party had to defend more than two-thirds of the Senate seats up for grabs but managed to make net gains. Furthermore, this was the last time the Republicans or either party won less than 10 Senate seats in a single election cycle, and the last time either party flipped a Senate seat in a presidential election year without carrying the state in the concurrent presidential election.

== Results summary ==
↓
| 53 | 2 | 45 |

| Democratic | Independent | Republican |

Shading indicates party with largest share of that line.

| Parties | | | | | | | | Total |
| Parties | Democratic | Republican | Independent | Libertarian | Independence | Green | Others | Total |
| Before these elections | 51 | 47 | 2 | — | — | — | — | 100 |
| Not up | 30 | 37 | — | — | — | — | — | 67 |
| Class 2 (2008→2014) | 20 | 13 | — | — | — | — | — | 33 |
| Class 3 (2010→2016) | 10 | 24 | — | — | — | — | — | 34 |
| Up | 21 | 10 | 2 | — | — | — | — | 33 |
| Class 1 | 21 | 10 | 2 | — | — | — | — | 33 |
| Incumbent retired | 6 | 3 | 1 | — | — | — | — | 10 |
| Held by same party | 5 | 2 | — | — | — | — | — | 7 |
| Replaced by other party | ▼1 Independent replaced by ▲1 Democrat ▼1 Republican replaced by ▲1 Independent ▼1 Democrat replaced by ▲1 Republican | | | — | — | — | — | 3 |
| Result | 6 | 3 | 1 | — | — | — | — | 10 |
| Incumbent ran | 15 | 7 (Note: In Indiana, Richard Lugar lost renomination for another term, Richard Mourdock became the party's new nominee.) (Note: Includes the interim appointee who won election to finish the term.) | 1 | — | — | — | — | 23 |
| Won re-election | 15 | 5 | 1 | — | — | — | — | 21 |
| Lost re-election | ▼1 Republican replaced by ▲1 Democrat | | — | — | — | — | — | 1 |
| Lost renomination but held by same party | — | — | — | — | — | — | — | Steady |
| Lost renomination and party lost | ▼1 Republican replaced by ▲1 Democrat | | — | — | — | — | — | 1 |
| Result | 17 | 5 | 1 | — | — | — | — | 23 |
| Total elected | 23 | 8 | 2 | — | — | — | — | 33 |
| Net gain/loss | ▲2 | ▼2 | Steady | — | — | — | — | 2 |
| Nationwide vote | 49,988,282 | 39,128,301 | 961,284 | 956,745 | 211,794 | 195,200 | 2,119,714 | 93,561,320 |
| Share | 53.43% | 41.82% | 1.03% | 1.02% | 0.23% | 0.21% | 2.27% | 100% |
| Result | 53 | 45 | 2 | — | — | — | — | 100 |
| End of this Congress | 51 | 47 | 2 | — | — | — | — | 100 |

== Change in composition ==
=== Before the elections ===
| D_{1} | D_{2} | D_{3} | D_{4} | D_{5} | D_{6} | D_{7} | D_{8} | D_{9} | D_{10} |
| D_{20} | D_{19} | D_{18} | D_{17} | D_{16} | D_{15} | D_{14} | D_{13} | D_{12} | D_{11} |
| D_{21} | D_{22} | D_{23} | D_{24} | D_{25} | D_{26} | D_{27} | D_{28} | D_{29} | D_{30} |
| D_{40} N.Y. Ran | D_{39} N.J. Ran | D_{38} Mont. Ran | D_{37} Mo. Ran | D_{36} Minn. Ran | D_{35} Mich. Ran | D_{34} Md. Ran | D_{33} Fla. Ran | D_{32} Del. Ran | D_{31} Calif. Ran |
| D_{41} Ohio; Ran | D_{42} Pa. Ran | D_{43} R.I. Ran | D_{44} Wash. Ran | D_{45} W.Va. Ran | D_{46} Hawaii; Retired | D_{47} Neb. Retired | D_{48} N.M. Retired | D_{49} N.D. Retired | D_{50} Va. Retired |
| Majority → | | | | | | | | | D_{51} Wis. Retired |
| R_{41} Nev. Ran | R_{42} Tenn. Ran | R_{43} Utah; Ran | R_{44} Wyo. Ran | R_{45} Ariz. Retired | R_{46} Maine; Retired | R_{47} Texas; Retired | I_{2} Conn. Retired | I_{1} Vt. Ran | D_{51} Wis. Retired |
| R_{40} Miss. Ran | R_{39} Mass. Ran | R_{38} Ind. Ran | R_{37} | R_{36} | R_{35} | R_{34} | R_{33} | R_{32} | R_{31} |
| R_{21} | R_{22} | R_{23} | R_{24} | R_{25} | R_{26} | R_{27} | R_{28} | R_{29} | R_{30} |
| R_{20} | R_{19} | R_{18} | R_{17} | R_{16} | R_{15} | R_{14} | R_{13} | R_{12} | R_{11} |
| R_{1} | R_{2} | R_{3} | R_{4} | R_{5} | R_{6} | R_{7} | R_{8} | R_{9} | R_{10} |

=== After the elections ===
| D_{1} | D_{2} | D_{3} | D_{4} | D_{5} | D_{6} | D_{7} | D_{8} | D_{9} | D_{10} |
| D_{20} | D_{19} | D_{18} | D_{17} | D_{16} | D_{15} | D_{14} | D_{13} | D_{12} | D_{11} |
| D_{21} | D_{22} | D_{23} | D_{24} | D_{25} | D_{26} | D_{27} | D_{28} | D_{29} | D_{30} |
| D_{40} N.J. Re-elected | D_{39} Mont. Re-elected | D_{38} Mo. Re-elected | D_{37} Minn. Re-elected | D_{36} Mich. Re-elected | D_{35} Md. Re-elected | D_{34} Hawaii; Hold | D_{33} Fla. Re-elected | D_{32} Del. Re-elected | D_{31} Calif. Re-elected |
| D_{41} N.M. Hold | D_{42} N.Y. Re-elected | D_{43} N.D. Hold | D_{44} Ohio; Re-elected | D_{45} Pa. Re-elected | D_{46} R.I. Re-elected | D_{47} Va. Hold | D_{48} Wash. Re-elected | D_{49} W.Va. Re-elected | D_{50} Wis. Hold |
| Majority → | | | | | | | | | D_{51} Conn. Gain |
| R_{41} Tenn. Re-elected | R_{42} Texas; Hold | R_{43} Utah; Re-elected | R_{44} Wyo. Re-elected | R_{45} Neb. Gain | I_{2} Maine; Gain | I_{1} Vt. Re-elected | D_{53} Mass. Gain | D_{52} Ind. Gain | D_{51} Conn. Gain |
| R_{40} Nev. Elected (Note: Appointee elected) | R_{39} Miss. Re-elected | R_{38} Ariz. Hold | R_{37} | R_{36} | R_{35} | R_{34} | R_{33} | R_{32} | R_{31} |
| R | R_{22} | R_{23} | R_{24} | R_{25} | R_{26} | R_{27} | R_{28} | R_{29} | R_{30} |
| R_{20} | R_{19} | R_{18} | R_{17} | R_{16} | R_{15} | R_{14} | R_{13} | R_{12} | R_{11} |
| R_{1} | R_{2} | R_{3} | R_{4} | R_{5} | R_{6} | R_{7} | R_{8} | R_{9} | R_{10} |

Key:

| D_{#} | Democratic |
| I_{#} | Independent |
| R_{#} | Republican |

== Race summary ==
=== Special elections during the 112th Congress ===
There were no special elections during the 112th Congress.

=== Elections leading to the next Congress ===
In these elections, the winners were elected for the term beginning January 3, 2013; ordered by state.

All of the elections involved the Class 1 seats.

| State | Incumbent | | | Results | Candidates |
| State | Senator | Party | Electoral history | Results | Candidates |
|---|---|---|---|---|---|
| Arizona | Jon Kyl | Republican | 1994; 2000; 2006 | Incumbent retired. Republican hold. | ▌ ✓ Jeff Flake (Republican) 49.2%; ▌Richard Carmona (Democratic) 46.1%; ▌Marc Victor (Libertarian) 4.6% |
| California | Dianne Feinstein | Democratic | 1992 (special); 1994; 2000; 2006 | Incumbent re-elected. | ▌ ✓ Dianne Feinstein (Democratic) 62.5%; ▌Elizabeth Emken (Republican) 37.5% |
| Connecticut | Joe Lieberman | Independent; Democrat | 1988 (Note: Senator Joe Lieberman was originally elected as a Democrat in 1988 and was re-elected in 1994 and 2000. He lost the Democratic primary in 2006, changed his affiliation as Independent, caucused with the Democratic party, and was re-elected that year.); 1994; 2000; 2006 | Incumbent retired. Democratic gain. | ▌ ✓ Chris Murphy (Democratic) 54.8%; ▌Linda McMahon (Republican) 43.1%; ▌Paul Passarelli (Libertarian) 1.7% |
| Delaware | Tom Carper | Democratic | 2000; 2006 | Incumbent re-elected. | ▌ ✓ Tom Carper (Democratic) 66.4%; ▌Kevin Wade (Republican) 29.0%; ▌Alex Pires (Independent) 3.8%; ▌Andrew Groff (Green) 0.8% |
| Florida | Bill Nelson | Democratic | 2000; 2006 | Incumbent re-elected. | ▌ ✓ Bill Nelson (Democratic) 55.2%; ▌Connie Mack IV (Republican) 42.2%; Others: ▌Chris Borgia (Independent) 1.0%; ▌Bill Gaylor (Independent) 1.5% |
| Hawaii | Daniel Akaka | Democratic | 1990 (appointed); 1990 (special); 1994; 2000; 2006 | Incumbent retired. Democratic hold. | ▌ ✓ Mazie Hirono (Democratic) 62.6%; ▌Linda Lingle (Republican) 37.4% |
| Indiana | Richard Lugar | Republican | 1976; 1982; 1988; 1994; 2000; 2006 | Incumbent lost renomination. Democratic gain. | ▌ ✓ Joe Donnelly (Democratic) 50.0%; ▌Richard Mourdock (Republican) 44.2%; ▌Andrew Horning (Libertarian) 5.7% |
| Maine | Olympia Snowe | Republican | 1994; 2000; 2006 | Incumbent retired. Independent gain. | ▌ ✓ Angus King (Independent) 52.9%; ▌Charlie Summers (Republican) 30.7%; ▌Cynthia Dill (Democratic) 13.3%; Others: ▌Danny F. Dalton (Independent) 0.8%; ▌Andrew Ian Dodge (Libertarian) 0.8% |
| Maryland | Ben Cardin | Democratic | 2006 | Incumbent re-elected. | ▌ ✓ Ben Cardin (Democratic) 56.0%; ▌Dan Bongino (Republican) 26.3%; ▌Rob Sobhani (Independent) 16.4%; ▌Imad-ad-Dean Ahmad (Libertarian) 1.2% |
| Massachusetts | Scott Brown | Republican | 2010 (special) | Incumbent lost re-election. Democratic gain. | ▌ ✓ Elizabeth Warren (Democratic) 53.7%; ▌Scott Brown (Republican) 46.3% |
| Michigan | Debbie Stabenow | Democratic | 2000; 2006 | Incumbent re-elected. | ▌ ✓ Debbie Stabenow (Democratic) 58.8%; ▌Pete Hoekstra (Republican) 38.0%; Others: ▌Scotty Boman (Libertarian) 1.8%; ▌Harley Mikkelson (Green) 0.6%; ▌Richard Matkin (Constitution) 0.6%; ▌John Litle (Natural Law) 0.2% |
| Minnesota | Amy Klobuchar | DFL | 2006 | Incumbent re-elected. | ▌ ✓ Amy Klobuchar (DFL) 65.2%; ▌Kurt Bills (Republican) 30.6%; ▌Stephen Williams (Independence) 2.6%; Others: ▌Tim Davis (Grassroots) 1.1%; ▌Michael Cavlan (Open Progressive) 0.5% |
| Mississippi | Roger Wicker | Republican | 2007 (appointed); 2008 (special) | Incumbent re-elected. | ▌ ✓ Roger Wicker (Republican) 57.2%; ▌Albert N. Gore Jr. (Democratic) 40.6%; Others: ▌Thomas Cramer (Constitution) 1.2%; ▌Shawn O'Hara (Reform) 1.0% |
| Missouri | Claire McCaskill | Democratic | 2006 | Incumbent re-elected. | ▌ ✓ Claire McCaskill (Democratic) 54.8%; ▌Todd Akin (Republican) 39.0%; ▌Jonathan Dine (Libertarian) 6.1% |
| Montana | Jon Tester | Democratic | 2006 | Incumbent re-elected. | ▌ ✓ Jon Tester (Democratic) 48.6%; ▌Denny Rehberg (Republican) 44.9%; ▌Dan Cox (Libertarian) 6.6% |
| Nebraska | Ben Nelson | Democratic | 2000; 2006 | Incumbent retired. Republican gain. | ▌ ✓ Deb Fischer (Republican) 57.8%; ▌Bob Kerrey (Democratic) 42.2% |
| Nevada | Dean Heller | Republican | 2011 (appointed) | Interim appointee elected. | ▌ ✓ Dean Heller (Republican) 45.9%; ▌Shelley Berkley (Democratic) 44.7%; ▌David VanderBeek (IAP) 4.9%; None of These Candidates 4.5% |
| New Jersey | Bob Menendez | Democratic | 2006 (appointed); 2006 | Incumbent re-elected. | ▌ ✓ Bob Menendez (Democratic) 58.9%; ▌Joe Kyrillos (Republican) 39.4%; Others: ▌Ken Kaplan (Libertarian) 0.5%; ▌Ken Wolski (Green) 0.5% |
| New Mexico | Jeff Bingaman | Democratic | 1982; 1988; 1994; 2000; 2006 | Incumbent retired. Democratic hold. | ▌ ✓ Martin Heinrich (Democratic) 51.0%; ▌Heather Wilson (Republican) 45.3%; ▌Jon Barrie (IAP) 3.6%; ▌Robert L. Anderson (write-in) 0.1% |
| New York | Kirsten Gillibrand | Democratic | 2009 (appointed); 2010 (special) | Incumbent re-elected. | ▌ ✓ Kirsten Gillibrand (Democratic) 71.6%; ▌Wendy Long (Republican) 27.0%; Others: ▌Colia Clark (Green) 0.6%; ▌Chris Edes (Libertarian) 0.5%; ▌John Mangelli (Common Sense) 0.3%; Write-ins 0.03% |
| North Dakota | Kent Conrad | Democratic-NPL | 1986; 1992 (retired); 1992 (special); 1994; 2000; 2006 | Incumbent retired. Democratic-NPL hold. | ▌ ✓ Heidi Heitkamp (Democratic-NPL) 50.2%; ▌Rick Berg (Republican) 49.3%; Other candidates 0.4% |
| Ohio | Sherrod Brown | Democratic | 2006 | Incumbent re-elected. | ▌ ✓ Sherrod Brown (Democratic) 50.7%; ▌Josh Mandel (Republican) 44.7%; ▌Scott A. Rupert (Independent) 4.6% |
| Pennsylvania | Bob Casey Jr. | Democratic | 2006 | Incumbent re-elected. | ▌ ✓ Bob Casey Jr. (Democratic) 53.7%; ▌Tom Smith (Republican) 44.6%; ▌Rayburn Douglas Smith (Libertarian) 1.7% |
| Rhode Island | Sheldon Whitehouse | Democratic | 2006 | Incumbent re-elected. | ▌ ✓ Sheldon Whitehouse (Democratic) 64.8%; ▌Barry Hinckley (Republican) 35.0%; ▌Write-ins 0.2% |
| Tennessee | Bob Corker | Republican | 2006 | Incumbent re-elected. | ▌ ✓ Bob Corker (Republican) 64.9%; ▌Mark Clayton (Democratic) 30.4%; Others: ▌Martin Pleasant (Green) 1.7%; ▌Shaun Crowell (Libertarian) 0.9%; ▌Kermit Steck (Constitution) 0.8% |
| Texas | Kay Bailey Hutchison | Republican | 1993 (special); 1994; 2000; 2006 | Incumbent retired. Republican hold. | ▌ ✓ Ted Cruz (Republican) 56.5%; ▌Paul Sadler (Democratic) 40.7%; Others: ▌John Jay Myers (Libertarian) 2.1%; ▌David Collins (Green) 0.9% |
| Utah | Orrin Hatch | Republican | 1976; 1982; 1988; 1994; 2000; 2006 | Incumbent re-elected. | ▌ ✓ Orrin Hatch (Republican) 65.3%; ▌Scott Howell (Democratic) 30.0%; ▌Shaun Lynn McCausland (Constitution) 3.2%; ▌Daniel Geery (UT Justice) 0.8% |
| Vermont | Bernie Sanders | Independent | 2006 | Incumbent re-elected. | ▌ ✓ Bernie Sanders (Independent) 71%; ▌John MacGovern (Republican) 24.9%; Others: ▌Cris Ericson (Marijuana) (Note: Officially, United States Marijuana Party in Vermont, which is not an affiliate of the United States Marijuana Party) 2.0%; ▌Pete Diamondstone (Liberty Union) 0.9%; ▌Peter Moss (Peace and Prosperity) 0.8%; ▌Laurel LaFramboise (VoteKISS) 0.3% |
| Virginia | Jim Webb | Democratic | 2006 | Incumbent retired. Democratic hold. | ▌ ✓ Tim Kaine (Democratic) 52.9%; ▌George Allen (Republican) 47.0%; Write-ins 0.17% |
| Washington | Maria Cantwell | Democratic | 2000; 2006 | Incumbent re-elected. | ▌ ✓ Maria Cantwell (Democratic) 60.5%; ▌Michael Baumgartner (Republican) 39.5% |
| West Virginia | Joe Manchin | Democratic | 2010 (special) | Incumbent re-elected. | ▌ ✓ Joe Manchin (Democratic) 60.6%; ▌John Raese (Republican) 36.5%; ▌Bob Henry Baber (Mountain) 3.0% |
| Wisconsin | Herb Kohl | Democratic | 1988; 1994; 2000; 2006 | Incumbent retired. New senator elected. Democratic hold. | ▌ ✓ Tammy Baldwin (Democratic) 51.4%; ▌Tommy Thompson (Republican) 45.9%; Others: ▌Joseph Kexel (Libertarian) 2.1%; ▌Nimrod Y. U. Allen III (IDEA) 0.6%; Write-ins 0.1% |
| Wyoming | John Barrasso | Republican | 2007 (appointed); 2008 (special) | Incumbent re-elected. | ▌ ✓ John Barrasso (Republican) 75.7%; ▌Tim Chesnut (Democratic) 21.7%; Others: ▌Joel Otto (Country) 2.5%; Write-ins 2% |

== Closest races ==
Elections with a margin less than 10.0%.

| District | Winner | Margin |
|---|---|---|
| North Dakota | Democratic | 0.9% |
| Nevada | Republican | 1.2% |
| Arizona | Republican | 3.0% |
| Montana | Democratic | 3.7% |
| Wisconsin | Democratic | 5.5% |
| New Mexico | Democratic | 5.7% |
| Indiana | Democratic (flip) | 5.7% |
| Virginia | Democratic | 5.9% (Note: Virginia was the "tipping point" state.) |
| Ohio | Democratic | 6.0% |
| Massachusetts | Democratic (flip) | 7.5% |
| Pennsylvania | Democratic | 9.1% |

== Final pre-election predictions ==
The table below gives an overview of some final predictions of the November general elections by several well-known institutes and people. While there were very few mistakes (predictions in the wrong direction; essentially only Montana and North Dakota, by both Sabato's Crystal Ball and FiveThirtyEight), FiveThirtyEight and Princeton Election Consortium had 2-4 races in the Lean categories and no tossups, whereas all other sources had at least eleven races in the middle three categories, and in particular many Tossup races.

| State | Incumbent | Last election (Note: The last elections for this group of senators were in 2006, except for those elected in a special election or who were appointed after the resignation or passing of a sitting senator, as noted.) | Roll Call Nov. 5, 2012 | Sabato Nov. 5, 2012 | Cook Nov. 1, 2012 | Rothenberg Nov. 2, 2012 | RCP Nov. 5, 2012 | 538 Nov. 6, 2012 | Princeton Nov. 6, 2012 | Winner |
|---|---|---|---|---|---|---|---|---|---|---|
| Arizona | Jon Kyl (retiring) | 53.3% R | Tossup | Lean R | Tossup | Tilt R | Lean R | Likely R | Likely R | Flake; 49.2% R |
| California | Dianne Feinstein | 59.4% D | Safe D | Safe D | Safe D | Safe D | Safe D | Safe D | Safe D | Feinstein; 62.5% D |
| Connecticut | Joe Lieberman (retiring) | 49.7% I | Lean D (flip) | Lean D (flip) | Tossup | Lean D (flip) | Lean D (flip) | Safe D (flip) | Safe D (flip) | Murphy; 54.8% D (flip) |
| Delaware | Tom Carper | 67.1% D | Safe D | Safe D | Safe D | Safe D | Safe D | Safe D | Safe D | Carper; 64.2% D |
| Florida | Bill Nelson | 60.3% D | Lean D | Likely D | Lean D | Likely D | Lean D | Safe D | Safe D | Nelson; 55.2% D |
| Hawaii | Daniel Akaka (retiring) | 61.4% D | Likely D | Likely D | Lean D | Likely D | Likely D | Safe D | Safe D | Hirono; 62.6% D |
| Indiana | Richard Lugar (lost renomination) | 87.3% R | Tossup | Lean D (flip) | Tossup | Tilt D (flip) | Tossup | Lean D (flip) | Likely D (flip) | Donnelly; 50.0% D (flip) |
| Maine | Olympia Snowe (retiring) | 74.4% R | Likely I (flip) | Likely I (flip) | Tossup | Likely I (flip) | Likely I (flip) | Safe I (flip) | Safe I (flip) | King; 52.9% I (flip) |
| Maryland | Ben Cardin | 54.2% D | Safe D | Safe D | Safe D | Safe D | Safe D | Safe D | Safe D | Cardin; 56.0% D |
| Massachusetts | Scott Brown | 51.9% R (2010 special) (Note: Democrat Ted Kennedy won with 69.5% of the vote in 2006, but died on August 25, 2009.) | Lean D (flip) | Lean D (flip) | Tossup | Tilt D (flip) | Tossup | Safe D (flip) | Safe D (flip) | Warren; 53.7% D (flip) |
| Michigan | Debbie Stabenow | 56.9% D | Likely D | Likely D | Likely D | Safe D | Likely D | Safe D | Safe D | Stabenow; 58.8% D |
| Minnesota | Amy Klobuchar | 58.1% D | Safe D | Safe D | Safe D | Safe D | Safe D | Safe D | Safe D | Klobuchar; 65.2% D |
| Mississippi | Roger Wicker | 55.0% R (2008 special) (Note: Republican Trent Lott won with 63.7% of the vote in 2006, but resigned on December 18, 2007.) | Safe R | Safe R | Safe R | Safe R | Safe R | Safe R | Safe R | Wicker; 57.2% R |
| Missouri | Claire McCaskill | 49.6% D | Lean D | Lean D | Likely D | Likely D | Lean D | Likely D | Safe D | McCaskill; 54.8% D |
| Montana | Jon Tester | 49.2% D | Tossup | Lean R (flip) | Tossup | Tossup | Tossup | Lean R (flip) | Lean D | Tester; 48.6% D |
| Nebraska | Ben Nelson (retiring) | 63.9% D | Likely R (flip) | Likely R (flip) | Lean R (flip) | Likely R (flip) | Lean R (flip) | Safe R (flip) | Safe R (flip) | Fischer; 57.8% R (flip) |
| Nevada | Dean Heller | Appointed (2011) (Note: Republican John Ensign won with 55.4% of the vote in 2006, but resigned on May 3, 2011.) | Tossup | Lean R | Tossup | Tilt R | Tossup | Likely R | Lean R | Heller; 45.9% R |
| New Jersey | Bob Menendez | 53.4% D | Safe D | Likely D | Likely D | Safe D | Likely D | Safe D | Safe D | Menendez; 58.9% D |
| New Mexico | Jeff Bingaman (retiring) | 70.6% D | Likely D | Likely D | Lean D | Lean D | Likely D | Safe D | Safe D | Heinrich; 51.0% D |
| New York | Kirsten Gillibrand | 59.6% D (2010 special) (Note: Democrat Hillary Clinton won with 67.0% of the vote in 2006, but resigned on January 21, 2009 to become United States Secretary of State.) | Safe D | Safe D | Safe D | Safe D | Safe D | Safe D | Safe D | Gillibrand; 71.6% D |
| North Dakota | Kent Conrad (retiring) | 68.8% D | Tossup | Lean R (flip) | Tossup | Tilt R (flip) | Tossup | Safe R (flip) | Lean D | Heitkamp; 50.24% D |
| Ohio | Sherrod Brown | 56.2% D | Lean D | Lean D | Lean D | Lean D | Lean D | Safe D | Safe D | Brown; 50.7% D |
| Pennsylvania | Bob Casey Jr. | 58.7% D | Lean D | Lean D | Lean D | Likely D | Lean D | Safe D | Safe D | Casey; 53.7% D |
| Rhode Island | Sheldon Whitehouse | 53.5% D | Safe D | Safe D | Safe D | Safe D | Safe D | Safe D | Safe D | Whitehouse; 64.8% D |
| Tennessee | Bob Corker | 50.7% R | Safe R | Safe R | Safe R | Safe R | Safe R | Safe R | Safe R | Corker; 64.9% R |
| Texas | Kay Bailey Hutchison (retiring) | 61.7% R | Safe R | Safe R | Safe R | Safe R | Safe R | Safe R | Safe R | Cruz; 56.5% R |
| Utah | Orrin Hatch | 62.6% R | Safe R | Safe R | Safe R | Safe R | Safe R | Safe R | Safe R | Hatch; 65.3% R |
| Vermont | Bernie Sanders | 65.4% I | Safe I | Safe I | Safe I | Safe I | Safe I | Safe I | Safe I | Sanders; 71% I |
| Virginia | Jim Webb (retiring) | 49.6% D | Tossup | Lean D | Lean D | Tossup | Tossup | Likely D | Safe D | Kaine; 52.9% D |
| Washington | Maria Cantwell | 56.9% D | Safe D | Safe D | Safe D | Safe D | Likely D | Safe D | Safe D | Cantwell; 60.5% D |
| West Virginia | Joe Manchin | 53.5% D (2010 special) (Note: Democrat Robert Byrd won with 64.4% of the vote in 2006, but died on June 28, 2010.) | Safe D | Safe D | Likely D | Safe D | Likely D | Safe D | Safe D | Manchin; 60.6% D |
| Wisconsin | Herb Kohl (retiring) | 67.3% D | Tossup | Lean D | Tossup | Tossup | Tossup | Likely D | Lean D | Baldwin; 51.4% D |
| Wyoming | John Barrasso | 73.4% R (2008 special) (Note: Republican Craig L. Thomas won with 69.99% of the vote in 2006, but died on June 4, 2007.) | Safe R | Safe R | Safe R | Safe R | Safe R | Safe R | Safe R | Barrasso; 75.7% R |

== Gains and losses ==
Map of retirements: Republican incumbent Democratic incumbent Independent incumbent Democratic incumbent retired Republican incumbent retired or lost renomination Independent incumbent retired

Results by county in 2012: 30%+ Democratic; 40%+ Democratic; 50%+ Democratic; 60%+ Democratic; 70%+ Democratic; 80%+ Democratic / 30%+ Republican; 40%+ Republican; 50%+ Republican; 60%+ Republican; 70%+ Republican; 80%+ Republican; 90%+ Republican / 40%+ Independent; 50%+ Independent; 60%+ Independent; 70%+ Independent

=== Retirements ===
Six Democrats, one independent Democrat, and three Republicans retired instead of seeking re-election.

| State | Senator | Age at end of term | Assumed office | Replaced by |
|---|---|---|---|---|
| Arizona | Jon Kyl | 70 | 1995 | Jeff Flake |
| Connecticut | Joe Lieberman | 70 | 1989 | Chris Murphy |
| Hawaii | Daniel Akaka | 88 | 1990 (Note: Appointed to the seat following the death of Spark Matsunaga.) | Mazie Hirono |
| Maine | Olympia Snowe | 65 | 1995 | Angus King |
| Nebraska | Ben Nelson | 71 | 2001 | Deb Fischer |
| New Mexico | Jeff Bingaman | 69 | 1983 | Martin Heinrich |
| North Dakota | Kent Conrad | 64 | 1992 (Note: Conrad had planned to retire at the end of the 102nd Congress and did not run for reelection to the Class III seat in the 1992 election; he later decided, however, to run for the Class I seat in the 1992 special election.) | Heidi Heitkamp |
| Texas | Kay Bailey Hutchison | 69 | 1993 (Note: Elected in the special election to finish Lloyd Bentsen's term.) | Ted Cruz |
| Virginia | Jim Webb | 66 | 2007 | Tim Kaine |
| Wisconsin | Herb Kohl | 77 | 1989 | Tammy Baldwin |

=== Defeats ===
Two Republicans sought re-election but lost in either the primary or general election.

| State | Senator | Age at end of term | Assumed office | Replaced by |
|---|---|---|---|---|
| Indiana | Richard Lugar | 80 | 1977 | Joe Donnelly |
| Massachusetts | Scott Brown | 53 | 2010 (Note: Elected in the special election to finish Ted Kennedy's term.) | Elizabeth Warren |

=== Post-election changes ===
One Democrat died before the start of the 113th Congress on December 17, 2012. One Democrat died during the 113th Congress on June 3, 2013. Two Democrats and one Republican resigned. All were replaced, at least initially, by appointees. In New Jersey and Massachusetts, special elections were held prior to the 2014 Senate elections for the remainder of the Class 2 terms, where Democrat Cory Booker won the New Jersey special election to succeed Republican appointee Jeffrey Chiesa, who did not seek election; and in Massachusetts, where Ed Markey won to succeed Democratic appointee Mo Cowan, who did not seek election.

| State | Senator | Replaced by |
|---|---|---|
| Hawaii (Class 3) | Daniel Inouye | Brian Schatz |
| South Carolina (Class 3) | Jim DeMint | Tim Scott |
| Massachusetts (Class 2) | John Kerry | Mo Cowan |
| New Jersey (Class 2) | Frank Lautenberg | Jeffrey Chiesa |
| Massachusetts (Class 2) | Mo Cowan | Ed Markey |
| New Jersey (Class 2) | Jeffrey Chiesa | Cory Booker |
| Montana (Class 2) | Max Baucus | John Walsh |

== Arizona ==
Arizona election
- Turnout: 52.9% (voting eligible)
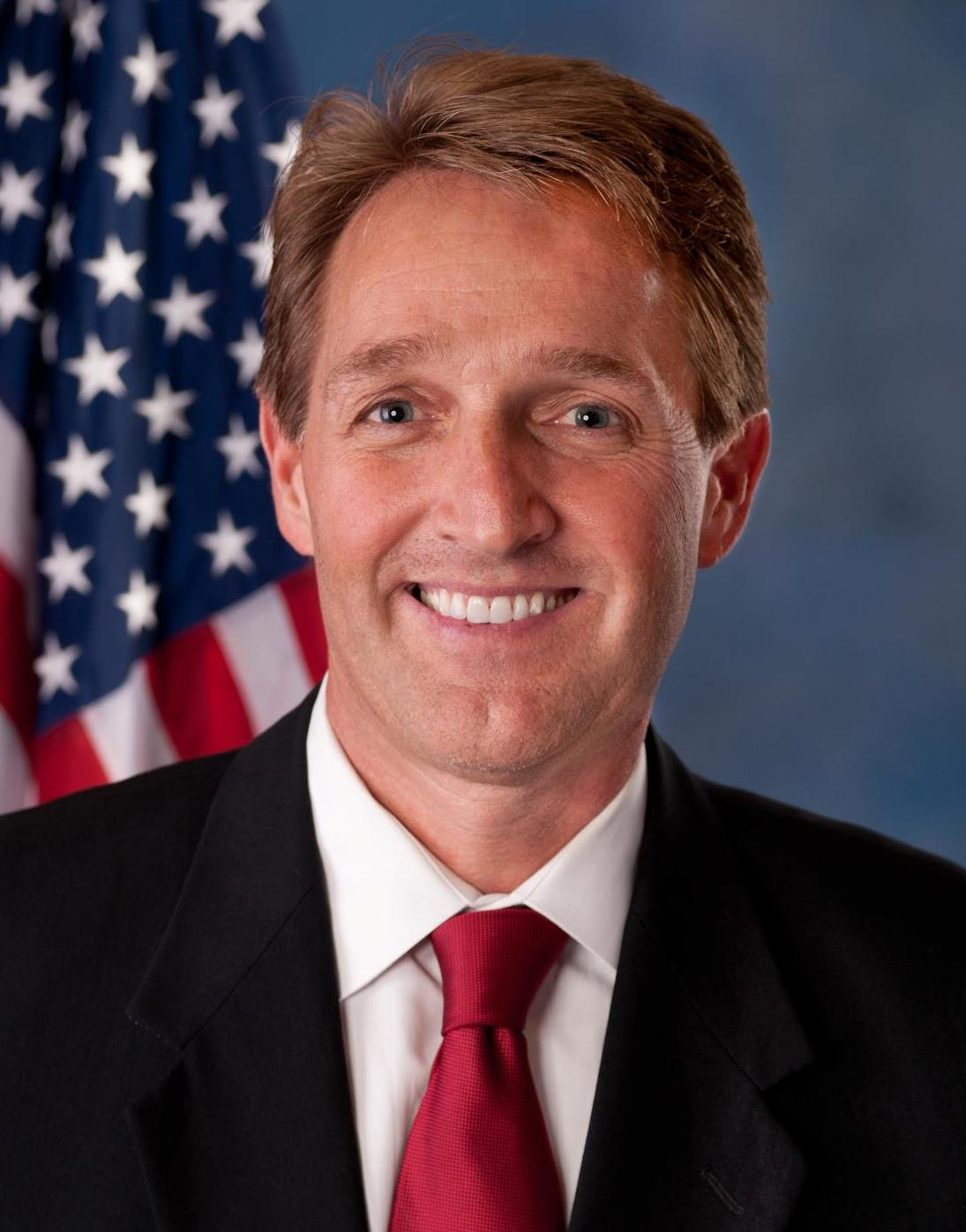

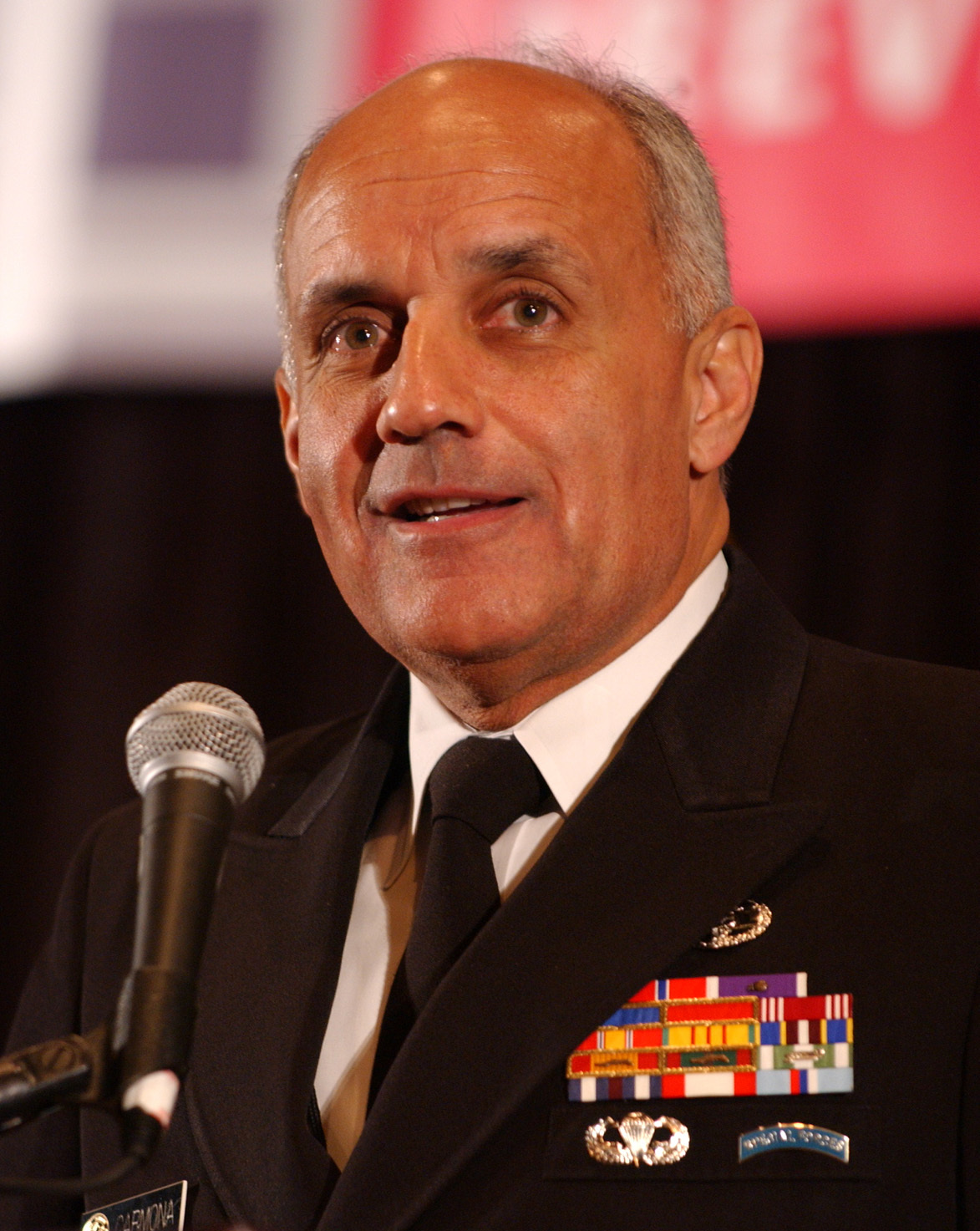
| Nominee | Jeff Flake | Richard Carmona |
| Party | Republican | Democratic |
| Popular vote | 1,104,457 | 1,036,542 |
| Percentage | 49.2% | 46.2% |
- Flake: 40–50% 50–60% 60–70% Carmona: 50–60% 60–70%
U.S. senator before election
Jon Kyl
Republican
Elected U.S. senator
Jeff Flake
Republican

Three-term incumbent and Senate Minority Whip Republican Jon Kyl, who was re-elected in 2006 with 53% of the vote, announced he would not seek a fourth term in 2012. Republican representative Jeff Flake won the August 28 primary with 69.1% of the vote, against three contenders, including real estate investor Wil Cardon who polled 21.2%. On the Democratic side, former U.S. Surgeon General Richard Carmona won the primary election, which was held August 28, 2012.

Arizona Democratic primary
| Party | Candidate | Votes | % |
|---|---|---|---|
| Democratic | Richard Carmona | 289,881 | 100.00 |
| Total votes | | 289,881 | 100.00 |

Arizona Republican primary
| Party | Candidate | Votes | % |
|---|---|---|---|
| Republican | Jeff Flake | 357,360 | 69.25 |
| Republican | Wil Cardon | 110,150 | 21.35 |
| Republican | Clair Van Steenwyk | 29,159 | 5.65 |
| Republican | Bryan Hackbarth | 19,174 | 3.72 |
| Republican | John Lyon (write-in) | 126 | 0.02 |
| Republican | Luis Acle (write-in) | 56 | 0.01 |
| Total votes | | 516,025 | 100.00 |

Preliminary general election results showed Flake leading 49.7%-45.7%, but 439,961 early votes had yet to be counted. The official results, as tabulated by the secretary of state, showed a slightly smaller win for Flake. Flake won the election with 49.7% of the vote against Carmona's 46.2% and Victor's 4.6%.

Arizona general election
| Party | Candidate | Votes | % | ±% |
|---|---|---|---|---|
| Republican | Jeff Flake | 1,104,457 | 49.23 | −4.11% |
| Democratic | Richard Carmona | 1,036,542 | 46.20 | +2.70% |
| Libertarian | Marc Victor | 102,109 | 4.55 | +1.39% |
| N/A | write-in | 2,501 | 0.11 | +0.02% |
| Majority | | 67,915 | 3.03 | −6.81% |
| Turnout | | 2,245,609 | 100.00 | |

== California ==
California election
- Turnout: 55.2% (voting eligible)
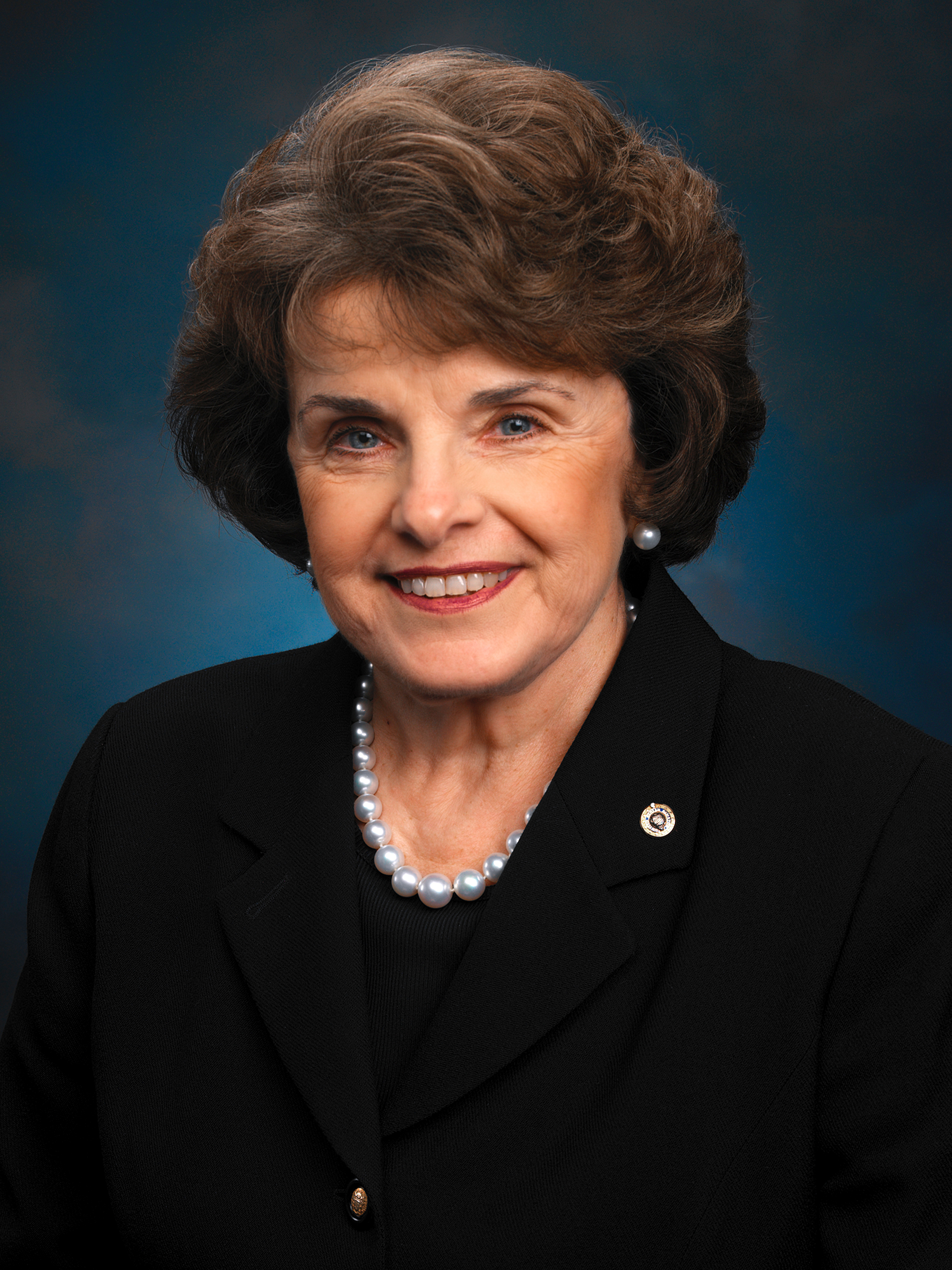

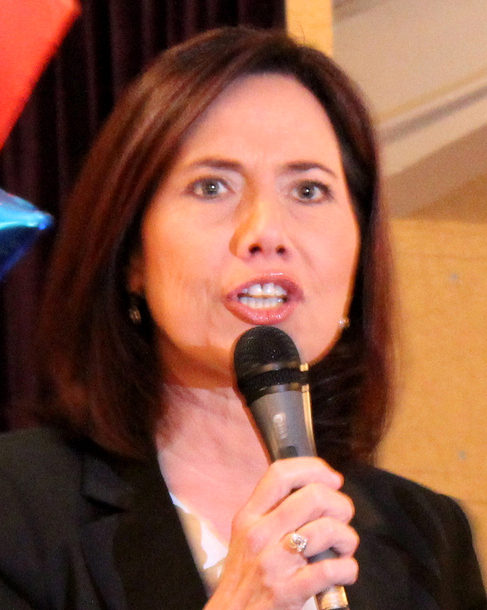
| Nominee | Dianne Feinstein | Elizabeth Emken |
| Party | Democratic | Republican |
| Popular vote | 7,864,624 | 4,713,887 |
| Percentage | 62.5% | 37.5% |
- Feinstein: 50–60% 60–70% 70–80% 80–90% Emken: 50–60% 60–70% 70–80%
U.S. senator before election
Dianne Feinstein
Democratic
Elected U.S. senator
Dianne Feinstein
Democratic

Incumbent Democrat Dianne Feinstein was re-elected. The primary election on June 5 took place under California's new blanket primary, where all candidates appear on the same ballot, regardless of party. In the primary, voters voted for any candidate listed, or write-in any other candidate. The top two finishers — regardless of party — advanced to the general election in November, even if a candidate managed to receive a majority of the votes cast in the June primary. In the primary, less than 15% of the total 2010 census population voted. Incumbent Democrat Dianne Feinstein finished first in the blanket primary with 49.5% of the vote. The second-place finisher was Republican candidate and autism activist Elizabeth Emken, who won 12.7% of the vote.

California primary election
| Party | Candidate | Votes | % |
|---|---|---|---|
| Democratic | Dianne Feinstein (incumbent) | 2,392,822 | 49.3 |
| Republican | Elizabeth Emken | 613,613 | 12.6 |
| Republican | Dan Hughes | 323,840 | 6.7 |
| Republican | Rick Williams | 157,946 | 3.3 |
| Republican | Orly Taitz | 154,781 | 3.2 |
| Republican | Dennis Jackson | 137,120 | 2.8 |
| Republican | Greg Conlon | 135,421 | 2.8 |
| Republican | Al Ramirez | 109,399 | 2.3 |
| Libertarian | Gail Lightfoot | 101,648 | 2.1 |
| Democratic | Diane Stewart | 97,782 | 2.0 |
| Democratic | Mike Strimling | 97,024 | 2.0 |
| Democratic | David Levitt | 76,482 | 1.6 |
| Republican | Oscar Braun | 75,842 | 1.6 |
| Republican | Robert Lauten | 57,720 | 1.2 |
| Peace and Freedom | Marsha Feinland | 54,129 | 1.2 |
| Democratic | Colleen Shea Fernald | 51,623 | 1.1 |
| Republican | Donald Krampe | 39,035 | 0.8 |
| American Independent | Don J. Grundmann | 33,037 | 0.7 |
| Republican | Dirk Allen Konopik | 29,997 | 0.6 |
| Republican | John Boruff | 29,357 | 0.6 |
| Democratic | Nak Shah | 27,203 | 0.6 |
| Republican | Rogelio T. Gloria | 22,529 | 0.5 |
| Republican | Nachum Shifren | 21,762 | 0.4 |
| Peace and Freedom | Kabiruddin Karim Ali | 12,269 | 0.3 |
| Republican | Linda R. Price (write-in) | 25 | 0.0 |
| Total votes | | 4,852,406 | 100.0 |

Feinstein and Emken contested the general election on November 6, with Feinstein winning re-election in a landslide, by 62.5% to 37.5%. Feinstein's 7.86 million votes set the all-time record for the most votes cast for one candidate in one state in one election, beating senator Barbara Boxer's 6.96 million votes in 2004. This record was held until the 2016 presidential election in California, when Hillary Clinton won 8.75 million votes in the state.

California general election
| Party | Candidate | Votes | % | ±% |
|---|---|---|---|---|
| Democratic | Dianne Feinstein (incumbent) | 7,864,624 | 62.5 | +3.1% |
| Republican | Elizabeth Emken | 4,713,887 | 37.5 | +2.5% |
| Majority | | 3,150,737 | 25.0 | +0.6% |
| Turnout | | 12,578,511 | 100.00 | |

== Connecticut ==
Connecticut election
- Turnout: 60.9% (voting eligible)
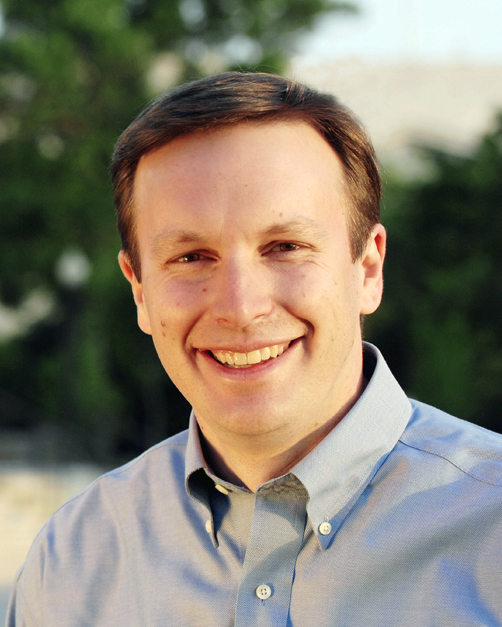

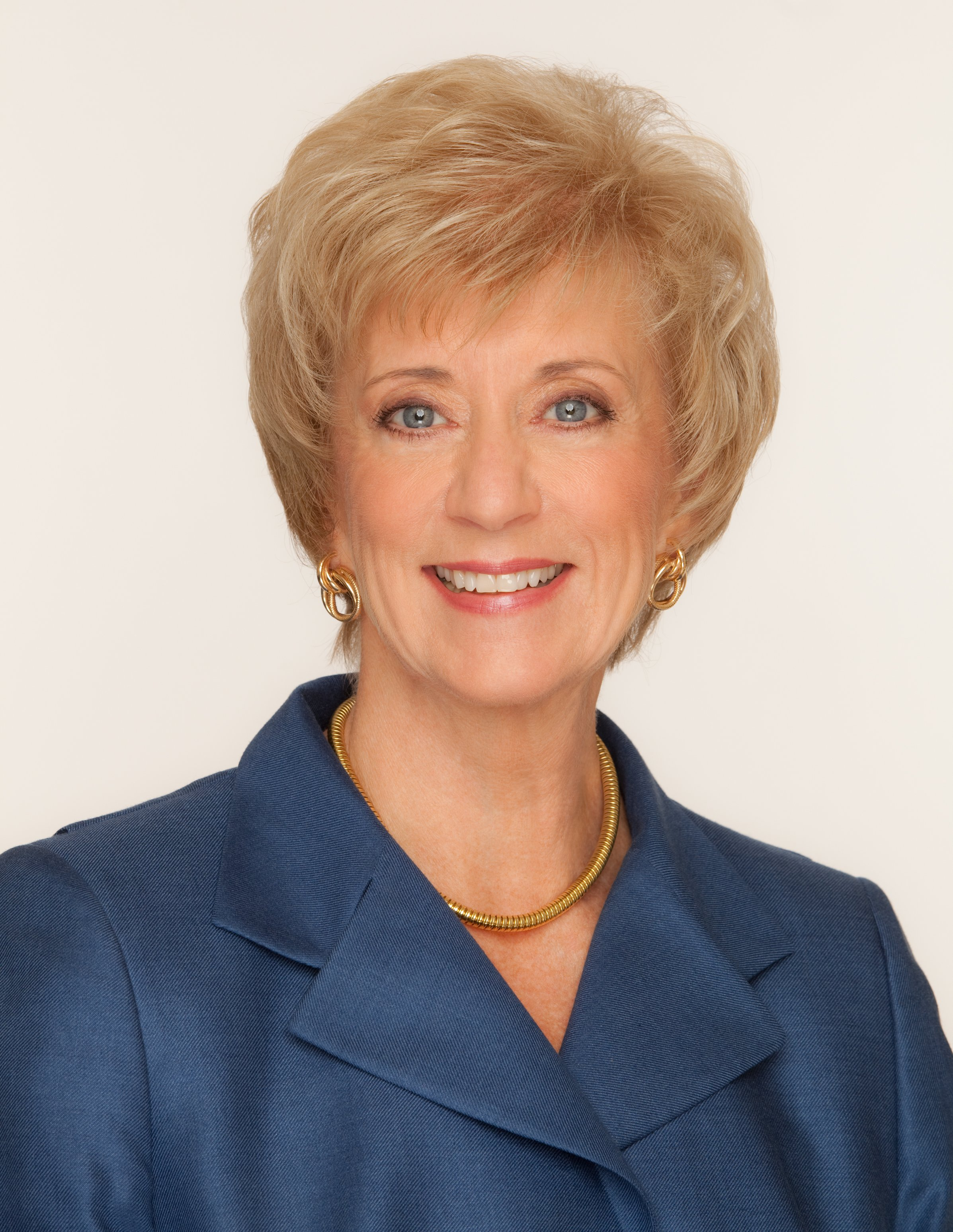
| Nominee | Chris Murphy | Linda McMahon |
| Party | Democratic | Republican |
| Popular vote | 815,077 | 637,857 |
| Percentage | 55.1% | 43.3% |
- Murphy: 40–50% 50–60% 60–70% 70–80% 80–90% McMahon: 40–50% 50–60% 60–70%
U.S. senator before election
Joe Lieberman
Independent
Elected U.S. senator
Chris Murphy
Democratic

Incumbent Joe Lieberman, an independent who caucused with the Democratic Party, retired instead of running for re-election to a fifth term. Republican businesswoman Linda McMahon faced Democratic representative Chris Murphy in the general election and lost, marking two defeats in as many years.

In the 2006 election, incumbent Joe Lieberman was defeated in the Democratic primary by businessman Ned Lamont and formed his own party, Connecticut for Lieberman, winning re-election. Lieberman promised to remain in the Senate Democratic Caucus, but had clashed with Democrats on many significant issues, including his endorsement of Republican 2008 presidential nominee John McCain over Barack Obama. As a result, Lieberman's poll numbers among Democrats had dropped significantly.

Connecticut Attorney General Richard Blumenthal was reportedly considering a run against Lieberman, but instead ran for and won Connecticut's other Senate seat in 2010 after U.S. senator Christopher Dodd announced his retirement.

Lieberman had publicly floated the possibility of running as a Democrat, Republican, or an independent. However, he announced on January 19, 2011, that he would not run for another term.

Connecticut Democratic primary
| Party | Candidate | Votes | % |
|---|---|---|---|
| Democratic | Chris Murphy | 89,283 | 67.4 |
| Democratic | Susan Bysiewicz | 43,135 | 32.6 |
| Total votes | | 132,418 | 100.0 |

Connecticut Republican primary
| Party | Candidate | Votes | % |
|---|---|---|---|
| Republican | Linda McMahon | 83,413 | 72.7 |
| Republican | Chris Shays | 31,305 | 27.3 |
| Total votes | | 114,718 | 100.0 |

Susan Bysiewicz was the first to declare herself as a candidate. However, by March 2011 Chris Murphy had raised over $1 million, while Bysiewicz had raised only $500,000. Murphy represented Connecticut's 5th congressional district, which was considered Republican-leaning, and he promoted himself as the most electable candidate against a Republican challenger. Bysiewicz, the former Secretary of the State of Connecticut, enjoyed high name recognition while a statewide officeholder, and had a formidable face-off with Murphy. William Tong, a state representative, joined the race touting his biography as the son of Chinese immigrants working at a Chinese restaurant. In January East Hartford resident Matthew John Oakes announced his candidacy. Oakes pointed to his real life experience being a disabled American, victim of crime, civil rights activist, growing up in the inner-city and being a political outsider for his candidacy.

Wide speculation continued on Linda McMahon, who had a widely publicized race for senator in 2010. She lost the election decisively, but had strong finances and a well-established political organization. McMahon met with her former campaign consultant to review her 2010 results, and said she was leaning towards running. She planned to make a decision regarding another run after the start of 2012. Congressman Chris Shays joined in August 2011, promoting his involvement in Iraq and Afghanistan's military contracting. Shays campaign also gained traction from a series of independent polls showing him beating or in dead heat with the top Democratic contenders in the general election, while those same polls showed McMahon losing handily to each of the top Democratic contenders. The Shays campaign has quickly capitalized on these polls, arguing for the former Congressman's electability while questioning McMahon's electability due to her loss in an open Senate seat contest in 2010 by a large margin despite spending $50 million of her own money, and also citing both her high unfavorable numbers among voters and her poor fundraising.

In July 2012, Shays declared that he would not support McMahon if she won the primary. He said that he had "never run against an opponent that I have respected less—ever—and there are a lot of candidates I have run against," adding that "I do not believe that Linda McMahon has spent the time, the energy to determine what [being] a senator really means." He also said that during the last debate he had with McMahon, "I thought she was embarrassingly clueless" and that "I think she is a terrible candidate and I think she would make a terrible senator." Although he said he would not support Chris Murphy, he expected him to win the Democratic nomination and the general election.

In September 2012, the records of the McMahons' 1976 bankruptcy and specifics of nearly $1 million unpaid debts from the proceeding were published. In days the candidate and her husband announced the "intention to reimburse all private individual creditors that can be located".

Connecticut general election
| Party | Candidate | Votes | % | ±% |
|---|---|---|---|---|
| Democratic | Chris Murphy | 828,761 | 55.1 | +15.4% |
| Republican | Linda McMahon | 651,089 | 43.3 | +33.7% |
| Libertarian | Paul Passarelli | 25,045 | 1.6 | +1.6% |
| Majority | | 177,672 | 11.8 | |
| Total votes | | 1,504,895 | 100.0 | - |
| Turnout | | | | |
| Democratic gain from Independent Democrat | | Swing | | |

Note: Murphy also appeared on the line of the Connecticut Working Families Party and received 37,553 votes on it. His Working Families and Democratic votes have been aggregated together on this table.

== Delaware ==
Delaware election
- Turnout: 62.7% (voting eligible)
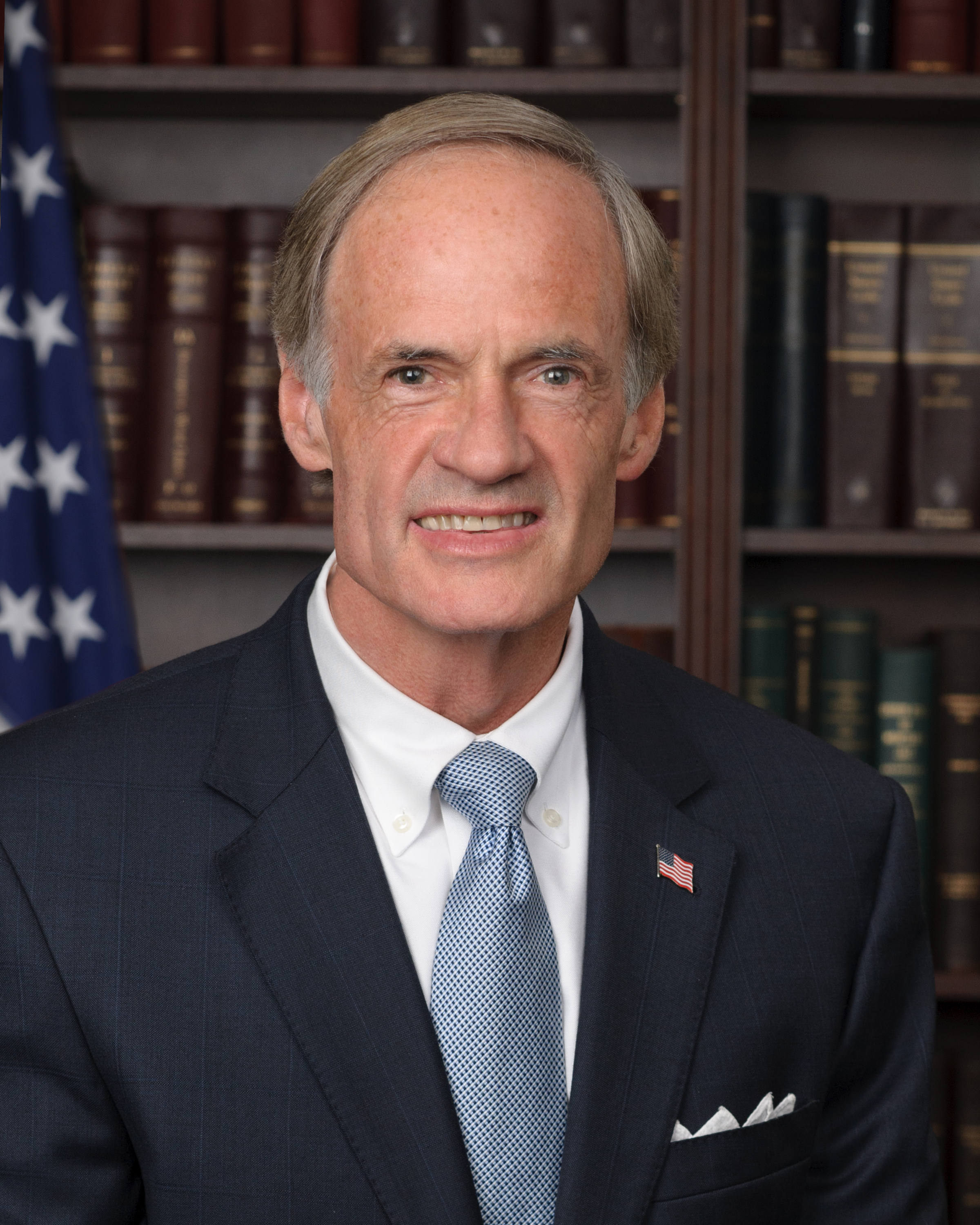

| Nominee | Tom Carper | Kevin Wade |
| Party | Democratic | Republican |
| Popular vote | 265,374 | 115,694 |
| Percentage | 66.4% | 29.0% |
- Carper: 40–50% 50–60% 60–70% 70–80%
U.S. senator before election
Tom Carper
Democratic
Elected U.S. senator
Tom Carper
Democratic

Incumbent Democrat Tom Carper won re-election to a third term.

Delaware Democratic primary
| Party | Candidate | Votes | % |
|---|---|---|---|
| Democratic | Tom Carper (incumbent) | 43,866 | 87.8 |
| Democratic | Keith Spanarelli | 6,074 | 12.2 |
| Total votes | | 49,940 | 100.0 |

2012 United States Senate election in Delaware
| Party | Candidate | Votes | % | ±% |
|---|---|---|---|---|
| Democratic | Tom Carper (incumbent) | 265,374 | 66.42 | −0.71% |
| Republican | Kevin Wade | 115,694 | 28.96 | +1.52% |
| Independent Party | Alex Pires | 15,300 | 3.83 | — |
| Green | Andrew Groff | 3,191 | 0.80 | — |
| Margin of victory | | 149,680 | 37.46 | −2.22% |
| Turnout | | 399,559 | 63.14 | +17.58% |
| Democratic hold | | | | |

Note: The ±% column reflects the change in total number of votes won by each party from the previous election. Neither the vote shares nor the turnout figures account for write-ins. Turnout percentage is the portion of registered voters (632,805 as of January 11, 2012) who voted.

== Florida ==
Florida election
- Turnout: 63.5% (voting eligible)
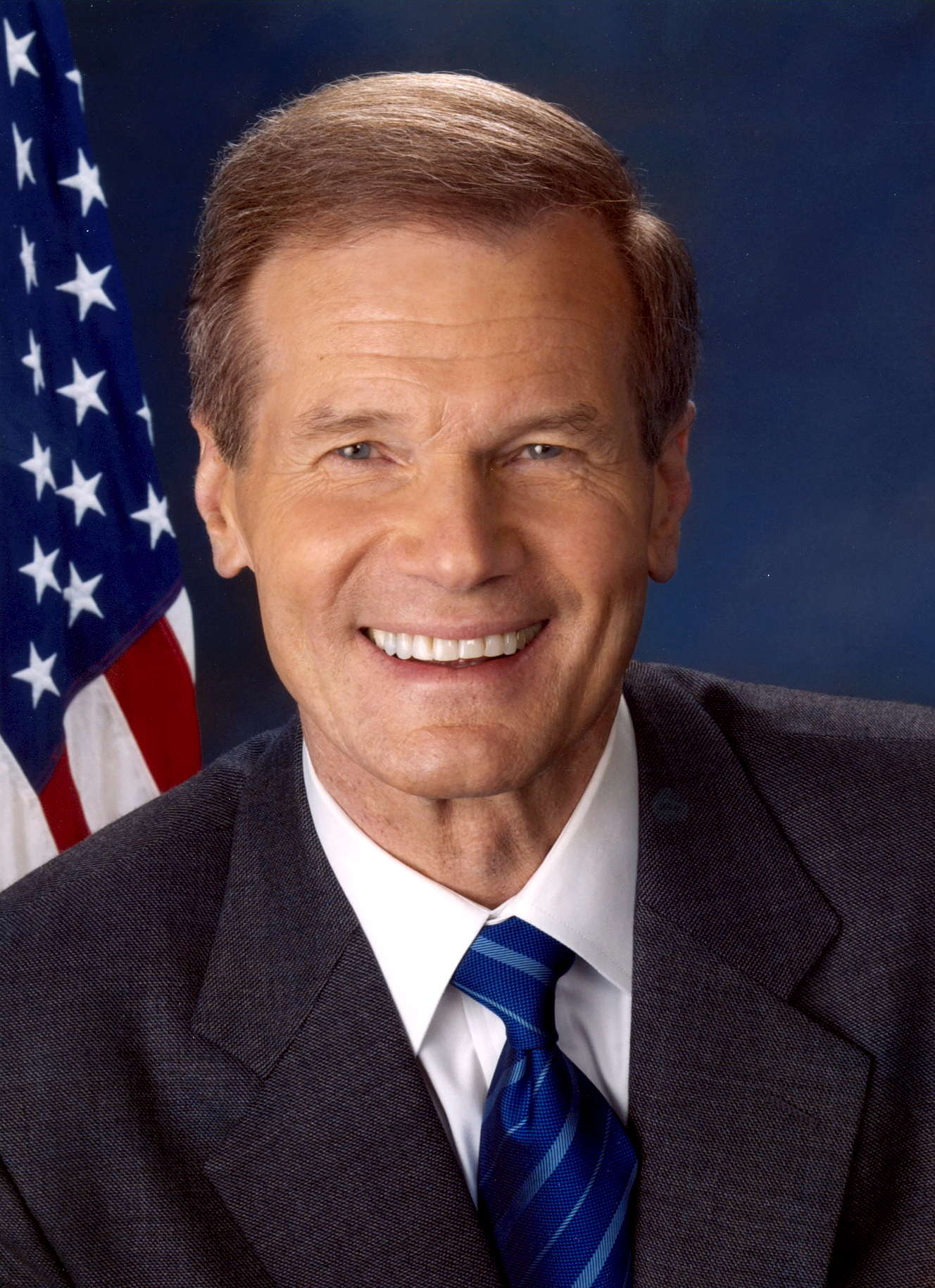

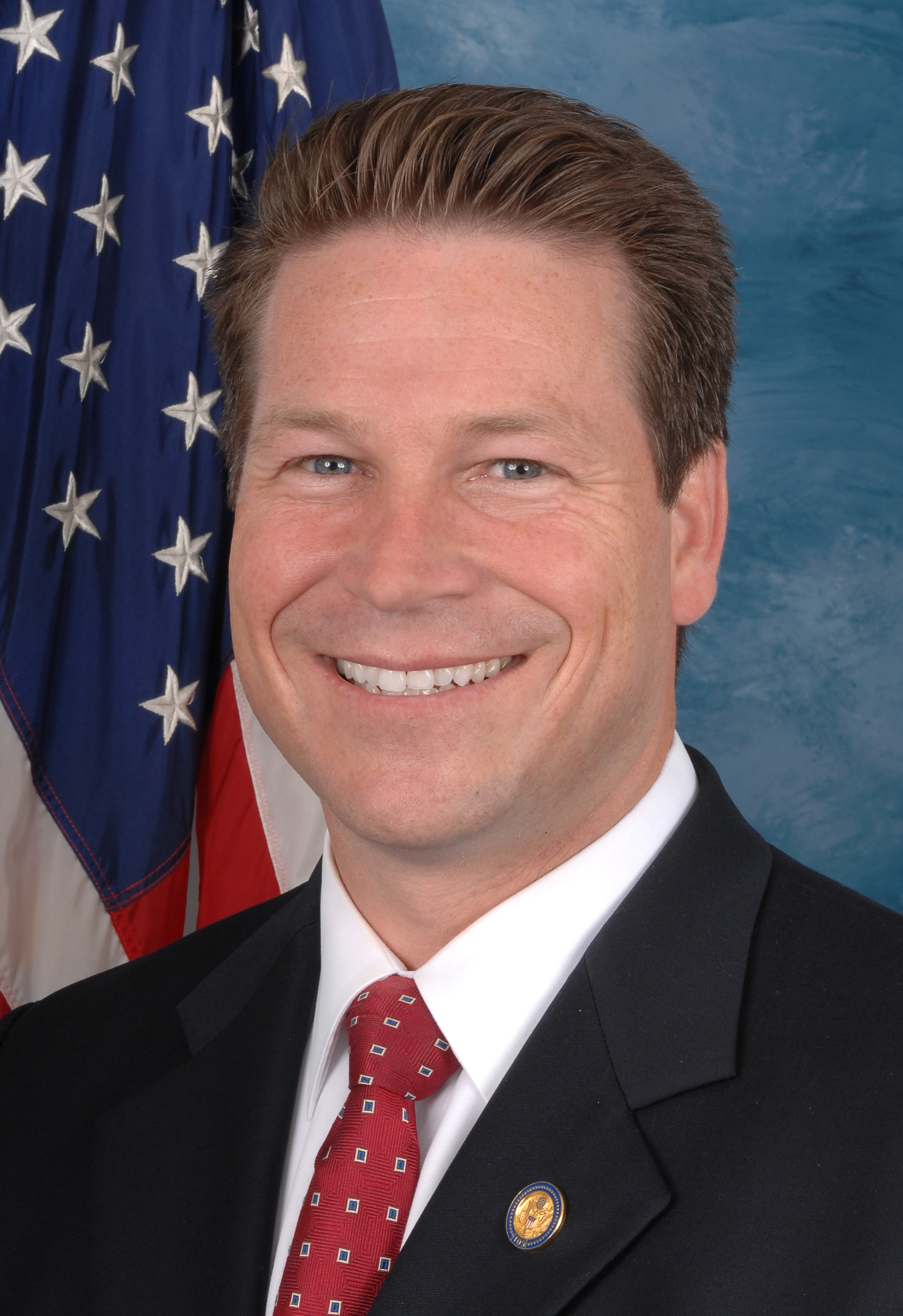
| Nominee | Bill Nelson | Connie Mack IV |
| Party | Democratic | Republican |
| Popular vote | 4,523,451 | 3,458,267 |
| Percentage | 55.2% | 42.2% |
- County results Nelson: 40–50% 50–60% 60–70% 70–80% Mack: 40–50% 50–60% 60–70%
U.S. senator before election
Bill Nelson
Democratic
Elected U.S. senator
Bill Nelson
Democratic

The primary election was held August 14, 2012. Incumbent Democrat Bill Nelson won re-election to a third term, defeating Republican U.S. Representative Connie Mack IV by 13%, winning 55% to 42%. Nelson defeated Mack by over 1 million votes.

Florida Democratic primary
| Party | Candidate | Votes | % |
|---|---|---|---|
| Democratic | Bill Nelson (incumbent) | 684,804 | 78.7 |
| Democratic | Glenn Burkett | 184,815 | 21.3 |
| Total votes | | 869,619 | 100.0 |

Florida Republican primary
| Party | Candidate | Votes | % |
|---|---|---|---|
| Republican | Connie Mack IV | 657,331 | 58.7 |
| Republican | Dave Weldon | 226,083 | 20.2 |
| Republican | Mike McCalister | 155,421 | 13.9 |
| Republican | Marielena Stuart | 81,808 | 7.3 |
| Total votes | | 1,120,643 | 100.0 |

From a long way out Nelson appeared to be vulnerable, with some earlier polls showing Mack leading. However, in the last few weeks with new polls conducted it appeared as though Nelson was headed for a victory. The last poll place him 5 percentage points ahead of Mack. In fact Nelson would win easily by 13 percentage points. Nelson performed well in Southeast Florida (the Miami area), Tampa, Gainesville, typically Democratic areas. Nelson however managed to win in areas that lean Republican. For example, Nelson won in Duval County home of Jacksonville, and Volusia County home of Daytona Beach. Nelson's ability to outperform President Obama led to him winning the Election easily. President Obama would still win Florida, but by just about 74,000 votes, and less than a percentage point. Nelson began his third term in the Senate on January 3, 2013.

General election results
| Party | Candidate | Votes | % | ±% |
|---|---|---|---|---|
| Democratic | Bill Nelson (incumbent) | 4,523,451 | 55.2 | −5.1% |
| Republican | Connie Mack IV | 3,458,267 | 42.2 | +4.1% |
| Independent | Bill Gaylor | 126,079 | 1.5 | n/a |
| Independent | Chris Borgia | 82,089 | 1.0 | n/a |
| Write-ins | | 60 | 0.0 | n/a |
| Majority | | 1,065,184 | 13.0 | −9.2% |
| Turnout | | 8,189,946 | | |
| Democratic hold | | Swing | | |

== Hawaii ==
Hawaii election
- Turnout: 44.2% (voting eligible)
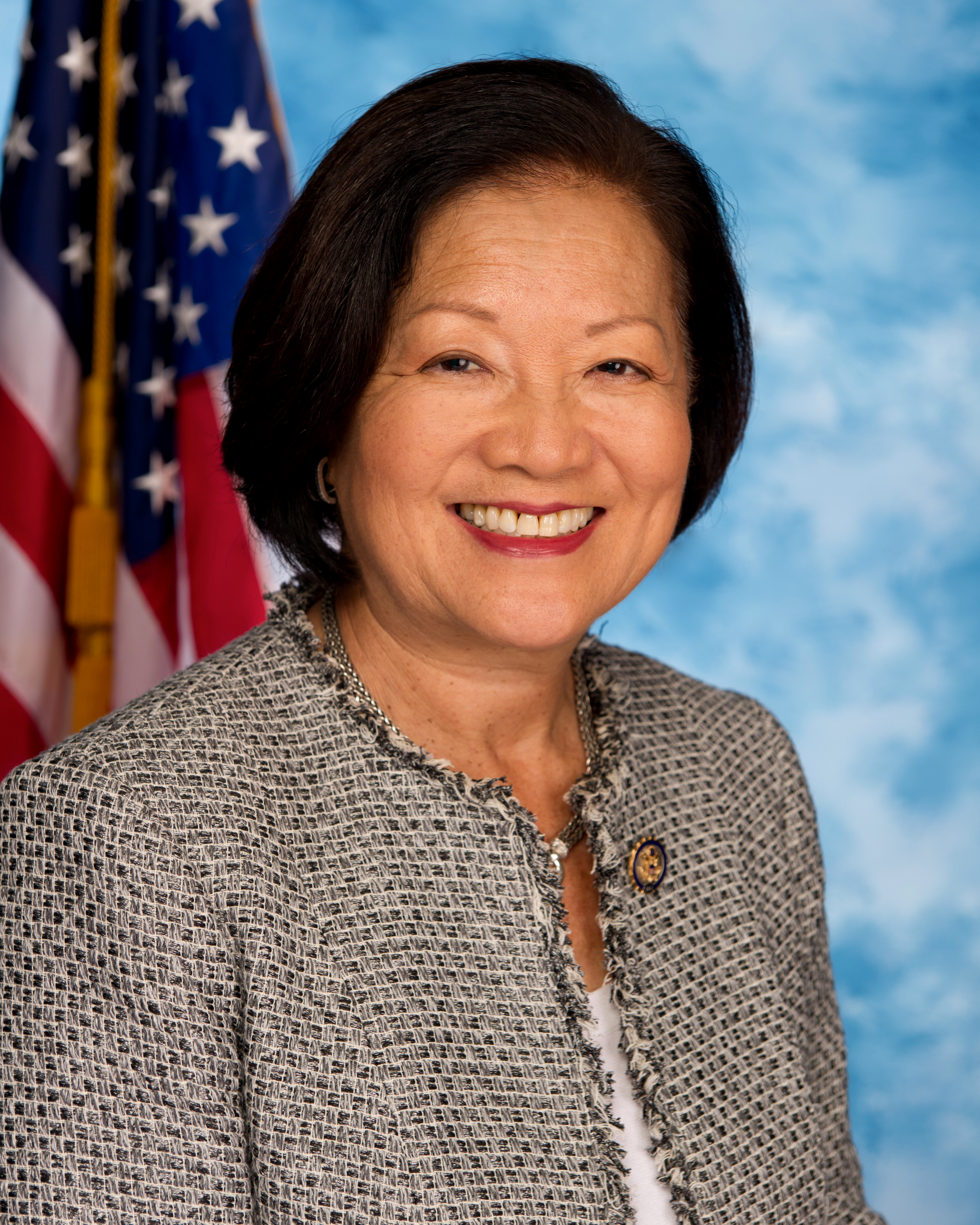

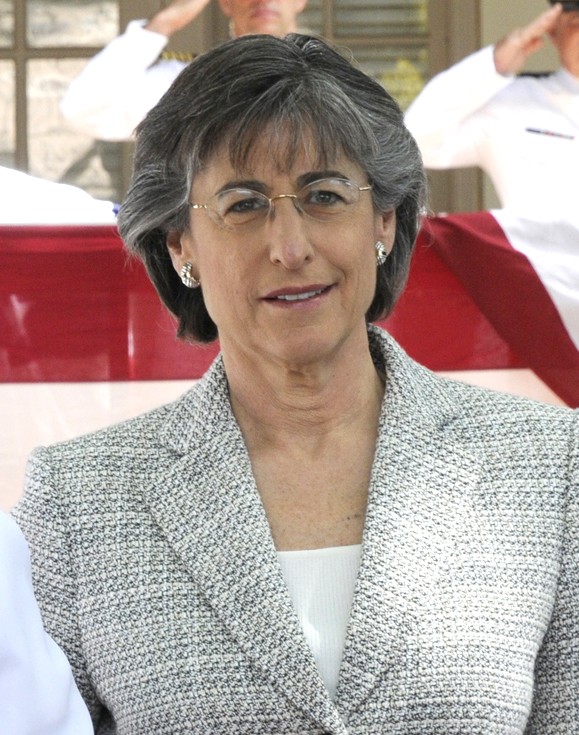
| Nominee | Mazie Hirono | Linda Lingle |
| Party | Democratic | Republican |
| Popular vote | 269,489 | 160,994 |
| Percentage | 62.6% | 37.4% |
- County results Hirono: 50–60% 60–70% 70–80%
U.S. senator before election
Daniel Akaka
Democratic
Elected U.S. senator
Mazie Hirono
Democratic

Incumbent Democrat Daniel Akaka retired instead of running for re-election to a fourth term. Democratic Congresswoman Mazie Hirono defeated former Hawaii Governor Linda Lingle in a rematch of the 2002 Hawaii gubernatorial election.

Hawaii Democratic primary
| Party | Candidate | Votes | % |
|---|---|---|---|
| Democratic | Mazie Hirono | 134,745 | 57 |
| Democratic | Ed Case | 95,553 | 40 |
| | Blank Votes | 3,331 | 1 |
| Democratic | Arturo Reyes | 1,720 | 1 |
| Democratic | Michael Gillespie | 1,104 | 1 |
| Democratic | Antonio Gimbernat | 517 | 0.2 |
| | Over Votes | 110 | 0 |
| Total votes | | 237,080 | 100 |

Hawaii Republican primary
| Party | Candidate | Votes | % |
|---|---|---|---|
| Republican | Linda Lingle | 44,252 | 90 |
| Republican | John Carroll | 2,900 | 6 |
| | Blank Votes | 749 | 2 |
| Republican | John Roco | 545 | 1 |
| Republican | Charles Collins | 366 | 1 |
| Republican | Eddie Pirkowski | 232 | 0.5 |
| | Over Votes | 25 | 0.1 |
| Total votes | | 49,069 | 100 |

Hawaii general election
| Party | Candidate | Votes | % | ±% |
|---|---|---|---|---|
| Democratic | Mazie Hirono | 269,489 | 62.6 | |
| Republican | Linda Lingle | 160,994 | 37.4 | |
| Majority | | 108,495 | 25.20 | |
| Turnout | | 430,483 | 44.2 | |

== Indiana ==
2012 United States Senate election in Indiana
- Turnout: 58.5%
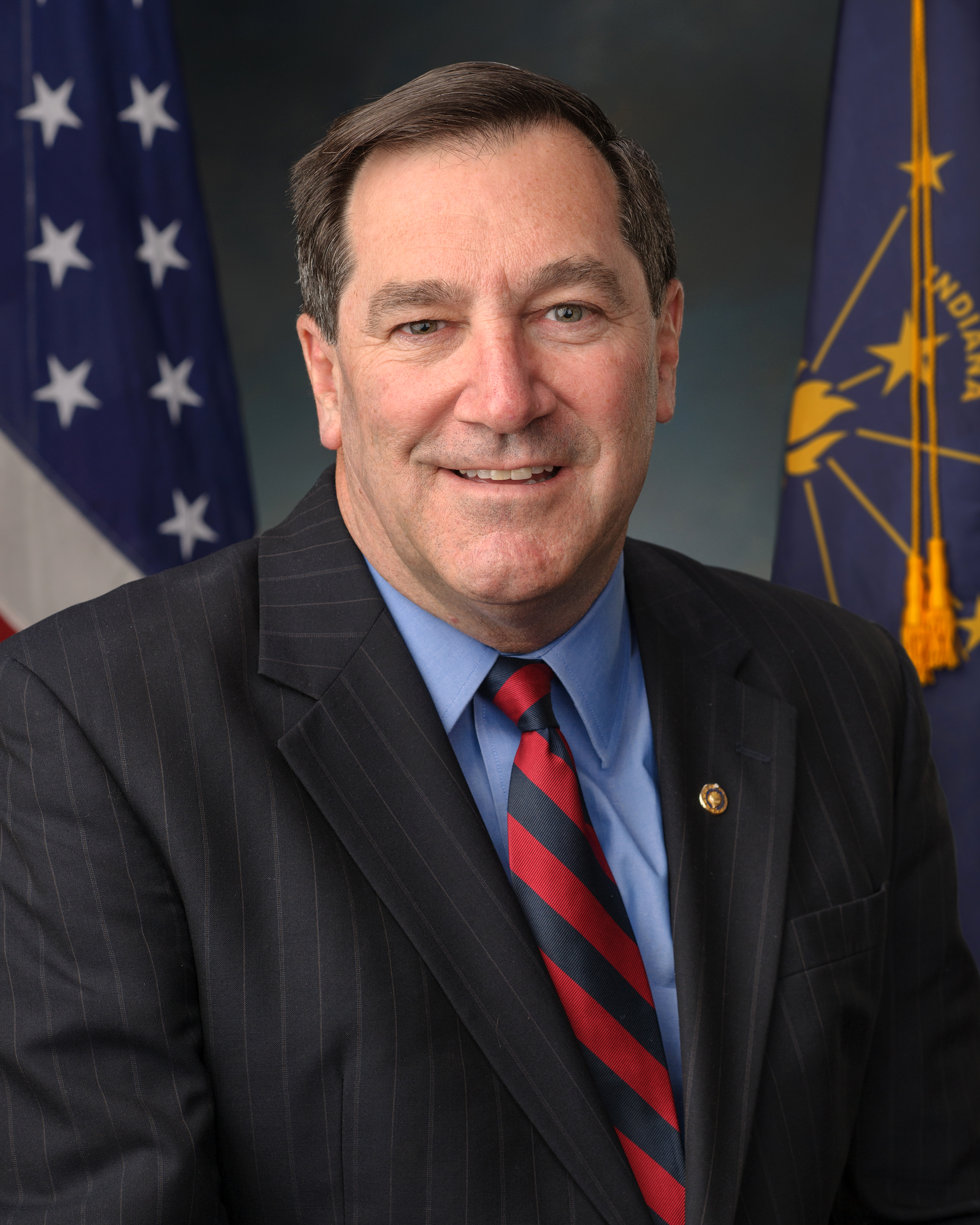

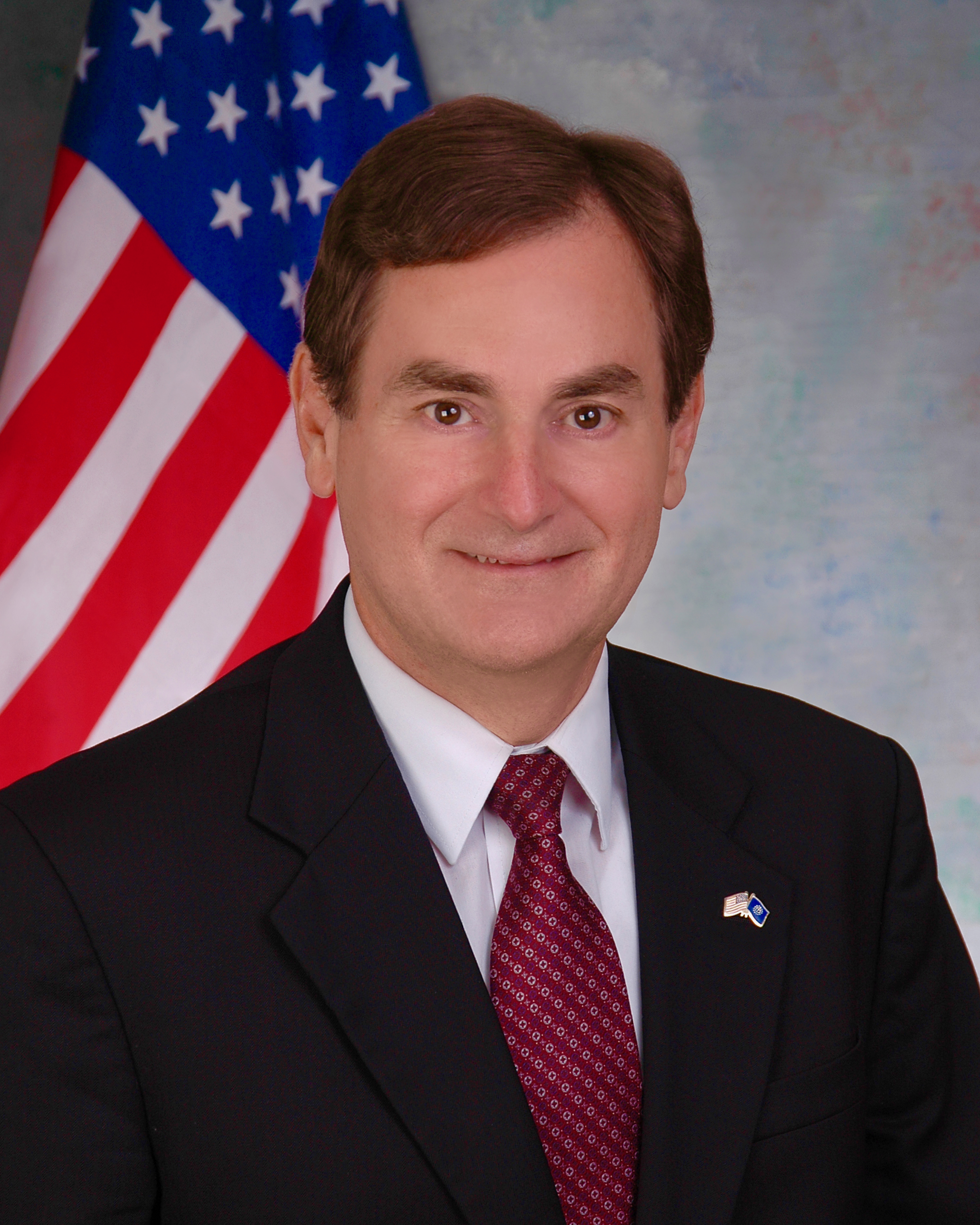
| Nominee | Joe Donnelly | Richard Mourdock | Andrew Horning |
| Party | Democratic | Republican | Libertarian |
| Popular vote | 1,281,181 | 1,133,621 | 145,282 |
| Percentage | 50.0% | 44.3% | 5.7% |
- County results Donnelly: 40–50% 50–60% 60–70% Mourdock: 40–50% 50–60% 60–70%
U.S. senator before election
Richard Lugar
Republican
Elected U.S. senator
Joe Donnelly
Democratic

Incumbent Republican Richard Lugar ran for re-election to a seventh term, but was defeated in the primary by Tea Party-backed Richard Mourdock. Congressman Joe Donnelly, a moderate Democrat from Indiana's 2nd Congressional District, received his party's nomination after running unopposed in the primary contest, and then defeated both Mourdock and Libertarian Andrew Horning in the general election.

Due to Lugar's unpopularity among some Tea Party voters on his positions regarding illegal immigration, voting to confirm then-U.S. Supreme Court nominees Sonia Sotomayor and Elena Kagan, the DREAM Act, the START Treaty, some gun control bills, and congressional earmarks, he was challenged by a Tea Party-backed candidate.

The Indiana Debate Commission's GOP primary debate with Sen. Richard Lugar and State Treasurer Richard Mourdock was set to air at 7 p.m. EDT on Wednesday, April 11. In a widely published poll taken March 26 to 28, Lugar was still in the lead, but by the time of a second published poll from April 30 to May 1, Mourdock was leading 48% to 38% for Lugar.

Mourdock defeated senator Lugar in the Republican primary on May 8, 2012.

According to Indiana law, Lugar's defeat meant that he would not be permitted to run in the election either as a third party or an independent candidate after he lost the primary.

Indiana Republican primary
| Party | Candidate | Votes | % |
|---|---|---|---|
| Republican | Richard Mourdock | 400,321 | 60.5 |
| Republican | Richard Lugar (incumbent) | 261,285 | 39.5 |
| Total votes | | 661,606 | 100.0 |

Indiana Democratic primary
| Party | Candidate | Votes | % |
|---|---|---|---|
| Democratic | Joe Donnelly | 207,715 | 100.0 |
| Total votes | | 207,715 | 100.0 |

Mourdock became embroiled in a controversy after stating that pregnancy from rape is "something that God intended". His remarks were made during a debate on October 23, 2012, while explaining his opposition to abortion even in the case of rape. At the debate Mourdock, when asked what his position on abortion was, responded:

"I know there are some who disagree and I respect their point of view but I believe that life begins at conception. The only exception I have to have an abortion is in that case of the life of the mother. I just struggled with it myself for a long time but I came to realize: "Life is that gift from God that I think even if life begins in that horrible situation of rape, that it is something that God intended to happen."

Media speculated that this could affect the outcome of the Senate race and Presidential race, and multiple sources noted the similarities with the rape and pregnancy statement controversies in the 2012 United States elections.

Responding to the criticism, Mourdock issued a statement saying: "God creates life, and that was my point. God does not want rape, and by no means was I suggesting that he does. Rape is a horrible thing, and for anyone to twist my words otherwise is absurd and sick." He was later quoted at a press conference also saying: "I believe God controls the universe. I don't believe biology works in an uncontrolled fashion." He however refused to issue an apology, even while prominent Republicans, including Sen. John McCain, called for him to do so.

On election night Donnelly won by about six percent. He performed well in Marion County, home of Indianapolis. Donnelly also won areas with major college campuses, such as Indiana University in Bloomington, Purdue University in Lafayette. Mourdock performed well, as expected in the Indianapolis suburbs, such as Hamilton County. Mourdock conceded defeat to Donnelly at around 11:30 P.M. EST.

Indiana general election
| Party | Candidate | Votes | % | ±% |
|---|---|---|---|---|
| Democratic | Joe Donnelly | 1,281,181 | 50.04 | +50.04% |
| Republican | Richard Mourdock | 1,133,621 | 44.28 | −43.08% |
| Libertarian | Andy Horning | 145,282 | 5.67 | −6.92% |
| No party | Write-ins | 18 | 0.00 | n/a |
| Majority | | 147,560 | 5.76 | −69.49% |
| Turnout | | 2,560,102 | 56.20 | +26.98% |
| Democratic gain from Republican | | Swing | | |

== Maine ==
2012 United States Senate election in Maine
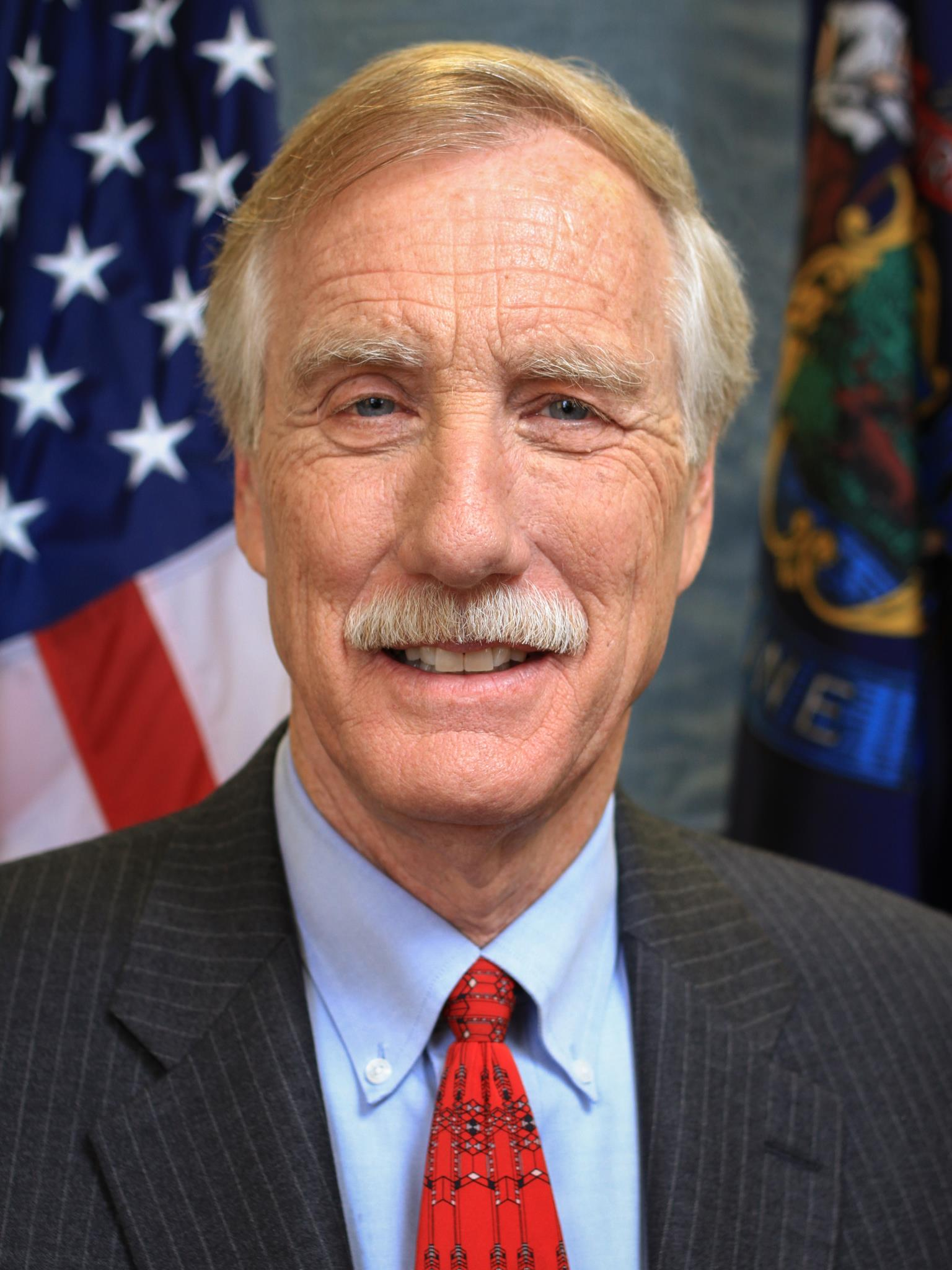

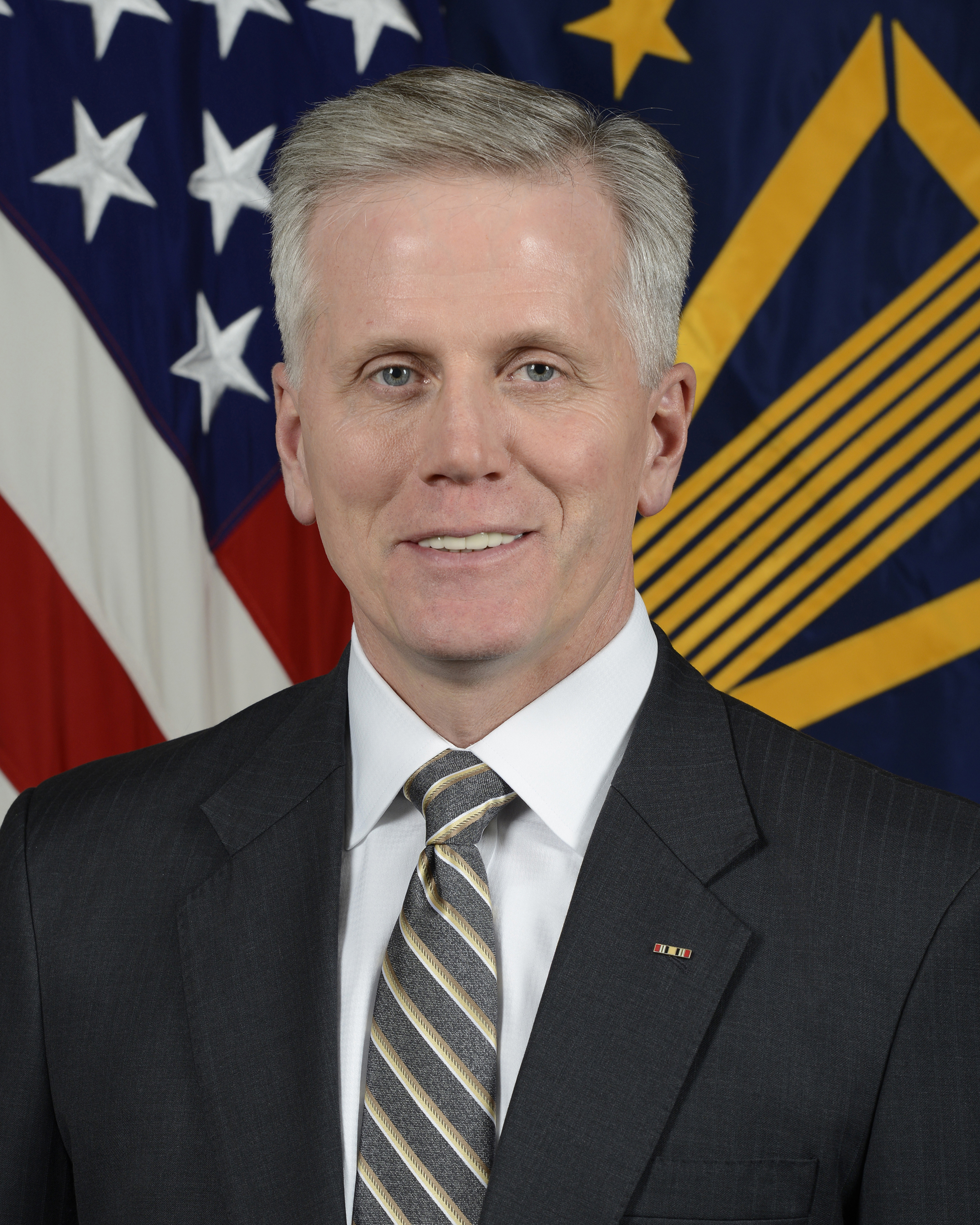

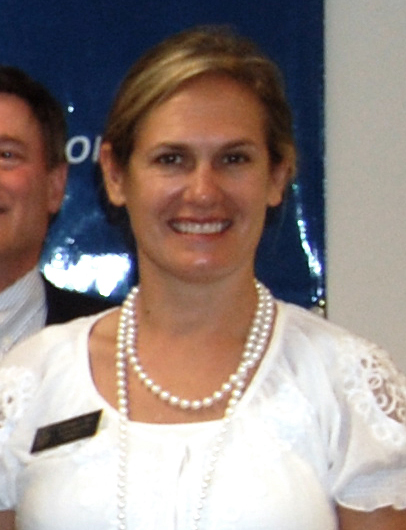
| Nominee | Angus King | Charlie Summers |
| Party | Independent | Republican |
| Popular vote | 368,724 | 214,114 |
| Percentage | 52.9% | 30.7% |
| Nominee | Cynthia Dill |
| Party | Democratic |
| Popular vote | 91,635 |
| Percentage | 13.2% |
- King: 30–40% 40–50% 50–60% 60–70% 70–80% >90% Summers: 30–40% 40–50% 50–60% 60–70% >90% Dill: 40–50% 60–70% >90% Tie: 30–40% 40–50% 50–60%
U.S. senator before election
Olympia Snowe
Republican
Elected U.S. senator
Angus King
Independent

Despite initially being in the race early on and poised to easily win, popular Republican Olympia Snowe suddenly retired instead of running for re-election to a fourth term. Former Independent Governor Angus King won the open seat. Following senator Joe Lieberman's retirement from the Senate in 2013, King became the second Independent incumbent senator, after Vermont's Bernie Sanders.

Incumbent Olympia Snowe won re-election to a third term in 2006 with 74.01% of the vote over Democrat Jean Hay Bright and independent Bill Slavick. Due to the unpopularity of some of Snowe's votes among conservative voters, namely for the American Recovery and Reinvestment Act of 2009 and initial support of the Patient Protection and Affordable Care Act, there was speculation that she would face competition in the 2012 Republican primary from more conservative challengers. The Tea Party Express had promised to aid in a primary against Snowe. There had also been speculation that Snowe would switch parties, though she has always denied this. By June 2011, Snowe had officially entered her name with signatures to run in the Republican primary, saying, she "would never switch parties".

However, on February 28, 2012, Snowe announced that she would be retiring from the U.S. Senate at the end of her term, citing the "atmosphere of polarization and 'my way or the highway' ideologies has become pervasive in campaigns and in our governing institutions" as the reason for her retirement. Her announcement opened the door for candidates from all parties and creating a much more contested 2012 election.

The primary election was held June 12.

Maine Republican primary
| Party | Candidate | Votes | % |
|---|---|---|---|
| Republican | Charlie Summers | 20,578 | 29.46 |
| Republican | Bruce Poliquin | 15,973 | 22.86 |
| Republican | Rick Bennett | 12,544 | 17.96 |
| Republican | Scott D'Amboise | 7,735 | 11.07 |
| Republican | William Schneider | 6,784 | 9.71 |
| Republican | Deborah Plowman | 6,244 | 8.94 |
| Total votes | | 69,098 | 100.00 |

Maine Democratic primary
| Party | Candidate | Votes | % |
|---|---|---|---|
| Democratic | Cynthia Dill | 22,629 | 44.31 |
| Democratic | Matt Dunlap | 18,202 | 35.64 |
| Democratic | Jon Hinck | 6,302 | 12.34 |
| Democratic | Benjamin Pollard | 3,945 | 7.72 |
| Total votes | | 51,078 | 100.00 |

Maine general election
| Party | Candidate | Votes | % | ±% |
|---|---|---|---|---|
| Independent | Angus King | 368,724 | 52.92 | +47.55% |
| Republican | Charlie Summers | 211,114 | 30.73 | −43.28% |
| Democratic | Cynthia Dill | 91,635 | 13.15 | −7.44% |
| Independent | Steve Woods | 10,321 | 1.48 | n/a |
| Independent | Danny Dalton | 6,450 | 0.93 | n/a |
| Libertarian | Andrew Ian Dodge | 5,543 | 0.80 | n/a |
| Independent gain from Republican | | Swing | | |

== Maryland ==
Maryland election
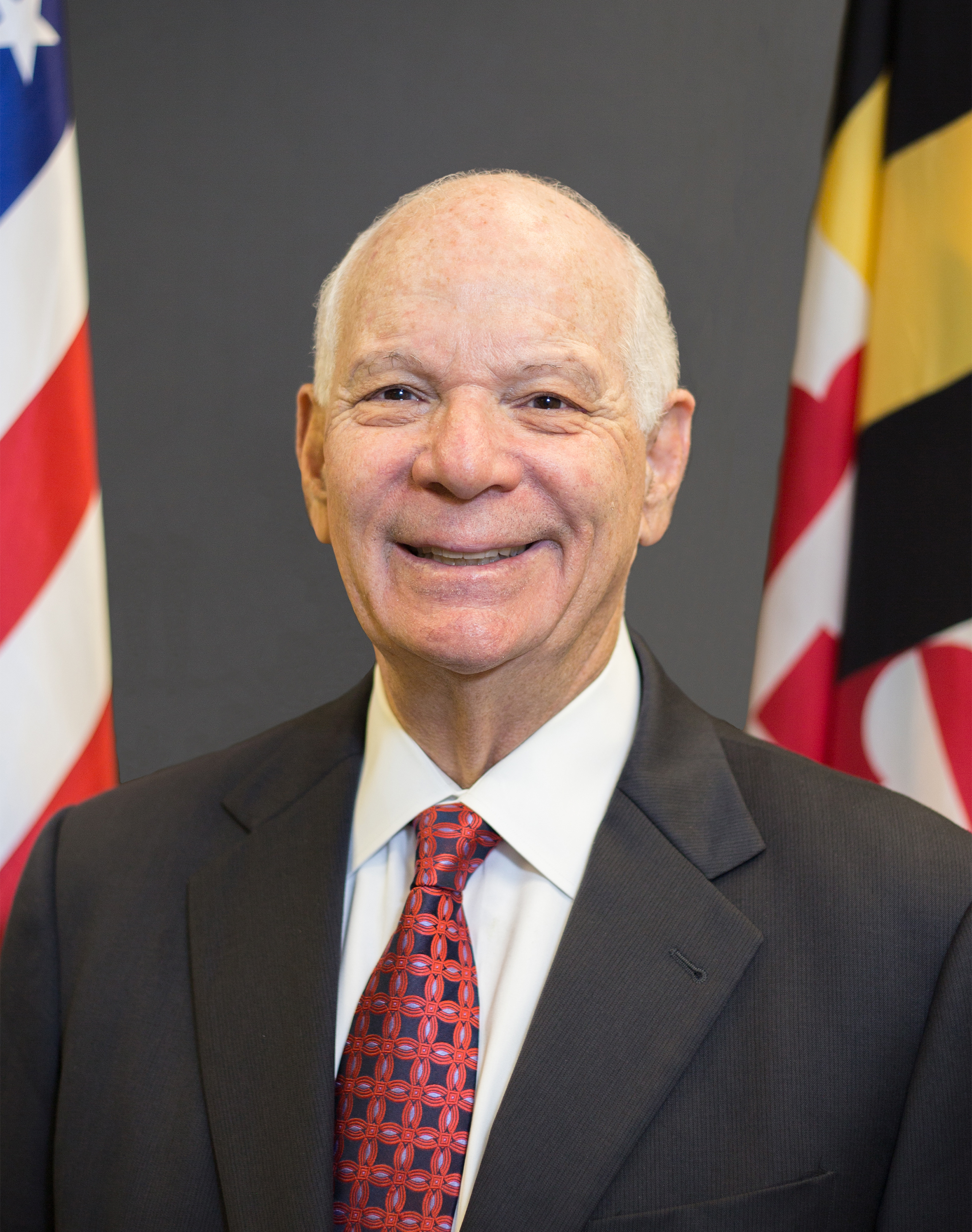

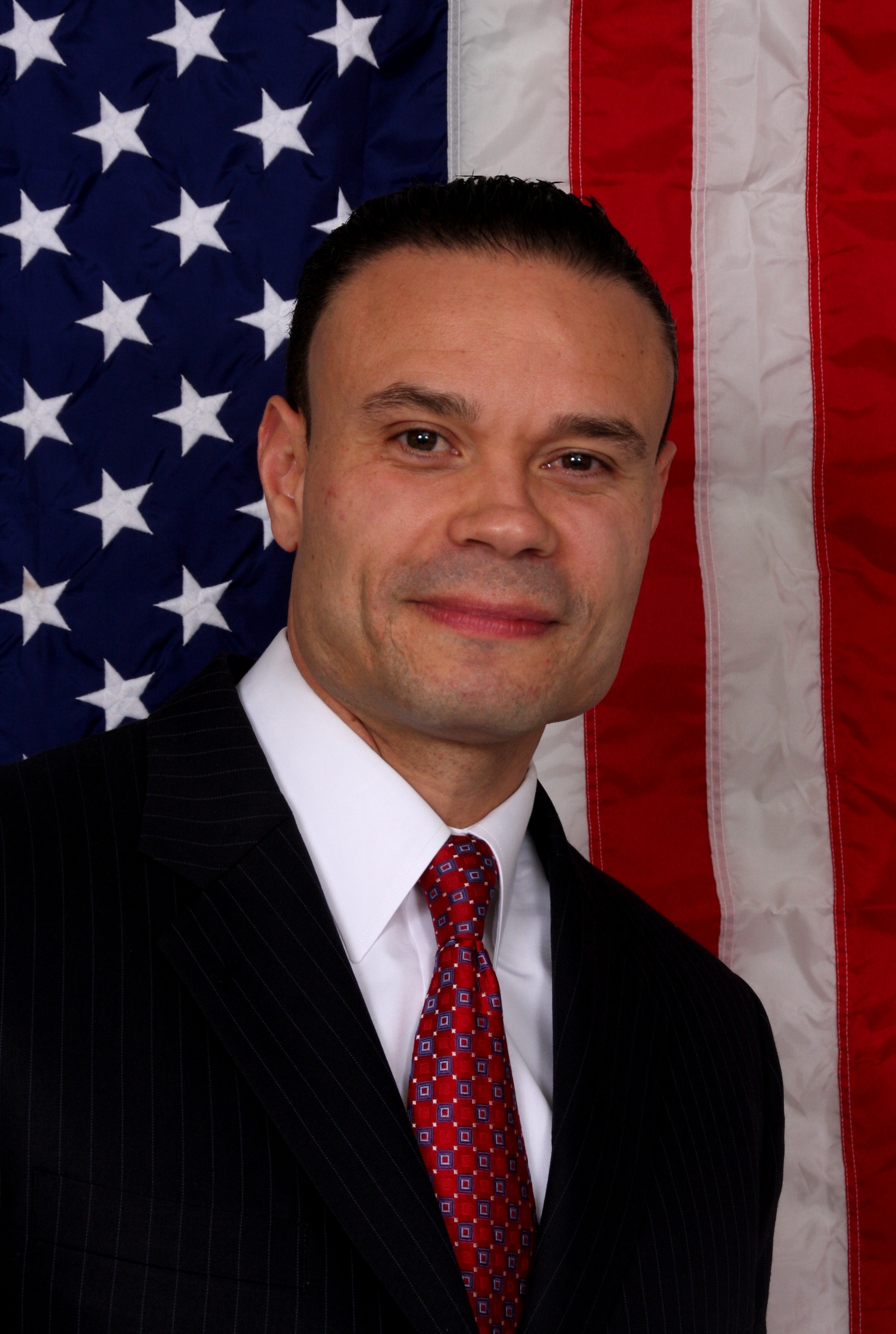

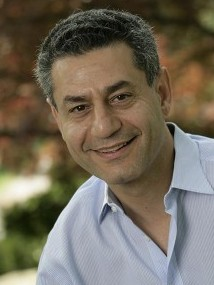
| Nominee | Ben Cardin | Dan Bongino |
| Party | Democratic | Republican |
| Popular vote | 1,402,092 | 674,649 |
| Percentage | 55.4% | 26.7% |
| Nominee | Rob Sobhani |
| Party | Independent |
| Popular vote | 420,554 |
| Percentage | 16.6% |
- County results Cardin: 30–40% 40–50% 50–60% 60–70% 70–80% 80–90% Bongino: 30–40% 40–50% 50–60% 60–70%
U.S. senator before election
Ben Cardin
Democratic
Elected U.S. senator
Ben Cardin
Democratic

Incumbent Democrat Ben Cardin won re-election to a second term, defeating Republican nominee Dan Bongino and independent Rob Sobhani.

Maryland Democratic primary
| Party | Candidate | Votes | % |
|---|---|---|---|
| Democratic | Ben Cardin (incumbent) | 240,704 | 74.2 |
| Democratic | C. Anthony Muse | 50,807 | 15.7 |
| Democratic | Chris Garner | 9,274 | 2.9 |
| Democratic | Raymond Levi Blagmon | 5,909 | 1.8 |
| Democratic | J. P. Cusick | 4,778 | 1.5 |
| Democratic | Blaine Taylor | 4,376 | 1.3 |
| Democratic | Lih Young | 3,993 | 1.2 |
| Democratic | Ralph Jaffe | 3,313 | 1.0 |
| Democratic | Ed Tinus | 1,064 | 0.3 |
| Total votes | | 324,218 | 100.0 |

Maryland Republican primary
| Party | Candidate | Votes | % |
|---|---|---|---|
| Republican | Daniel Bongino | 68,597 | 33.6 |
| Republican | Richard J. Douglas | 57,776 | 28.3 |
| Republican | Joseph Alexander | 18,171 | 8.9 |
| Republican | Bro Broadus | 11,020 | 5.4 |
| Republican | Rick Hoover | 10,787 | 5.3 |
| Republican | John B. Kimble | 10,506 | 5.1 |
| Republican | David Jones | 8,380 | 4.1 |
| Republican | Corrogan R. Vaughn | 8,158 | 4.0 |
| Republican | William Thomas Capps, Jr. | 7,092 | 3.5 |
| Republican | Brian Vaeth | 3,781 | 1.9 |
| Total votes | | 204,268 | 100.0 |

In both 2010 and 2009, National Journal magazine rated Cardin as tied for most liberal senator, based on his voting record. As of June 30, Cardin had $1.8 million in his campaign account.

Maryland general election
| Party | Candidate | Votes | % | ±% |
|---|---|---|---|---|
| Democratic | Ben Cardin (incumbent) | 1,402,092 | 55.41 | +1.20% |
| Republican | Daniel Bongino | 674,649 | 26.66 | −17.53% |
| Independent | S. Rob Sobhani | 420,554 | 16.62 | N/A |
| Libertarian | Dean Ahmad | 30,672 | 1.21 | +1.21% |
| N/A | Others (write-in) | 2,583 | 0.10 | +0.05% |
| Majority | | 727,443 | 100.00 | |
| Turnout | | 2,530,550 | 68.23 | |
| Democratic hold | | Swing | | |

== Massachusetts ==
2012 United States Senate election in Massachusetts
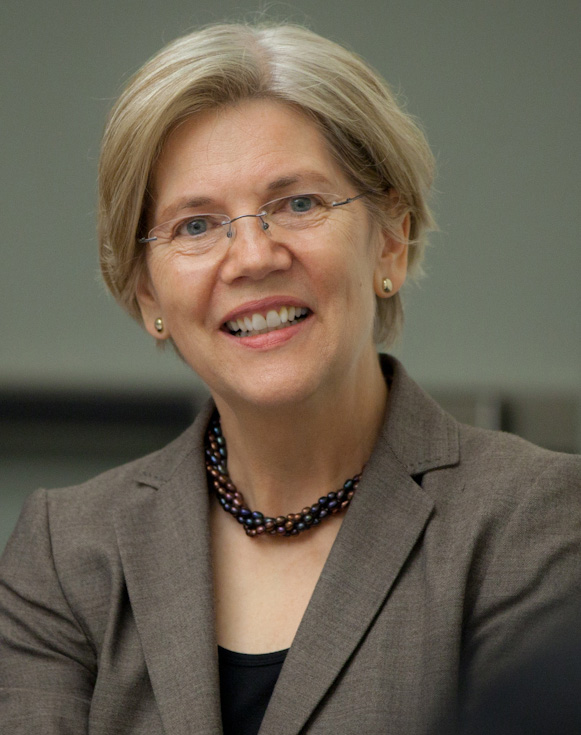

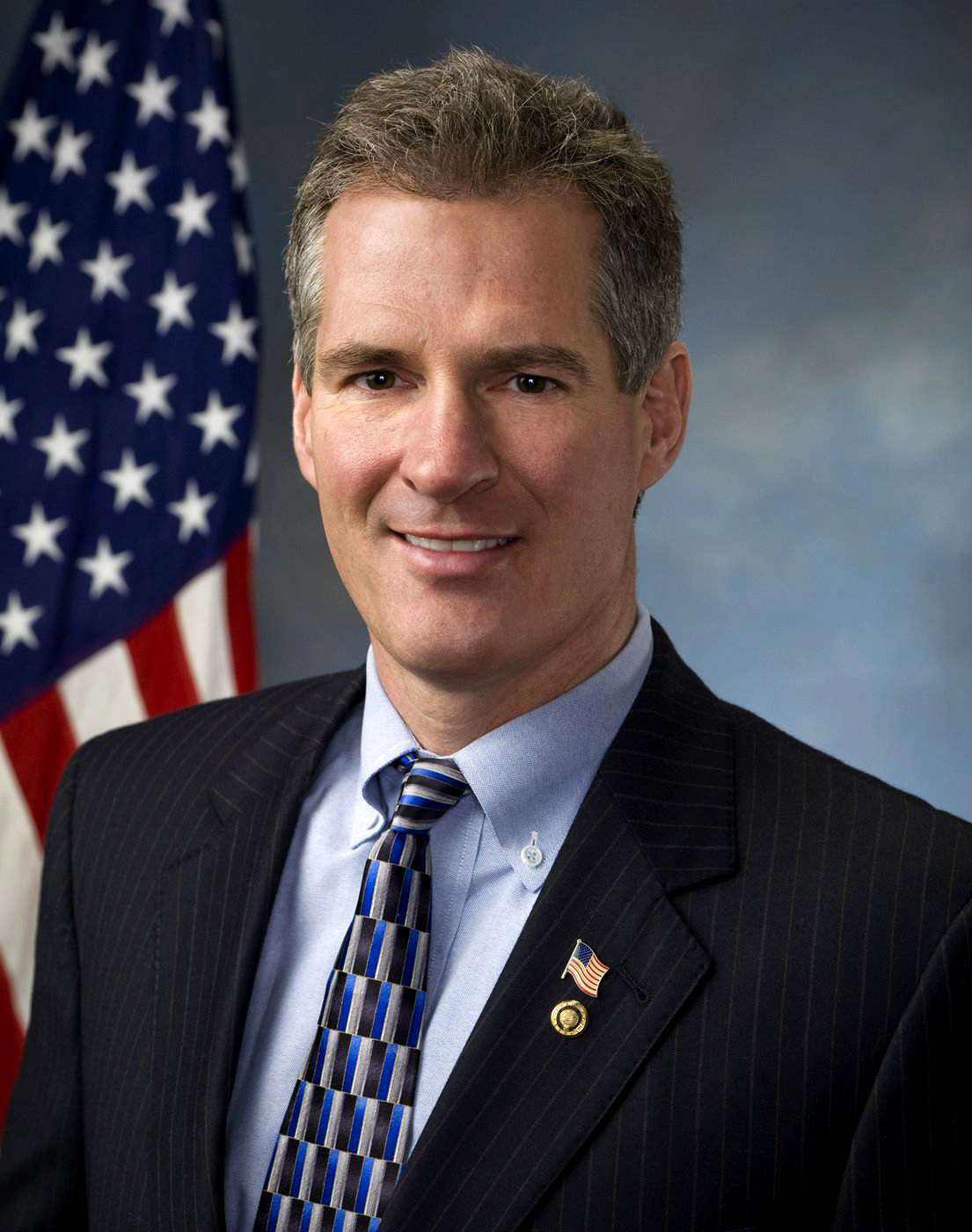
| Nominee | Elizabeth Warren | Scott Brown |
| Party | Democratic | Republican |
| Popular vote | 1,696,346 | 1,458,048 |
| Percentage | 53.7% | 46.2% |
- Warren: 40–50% 50–60% 60–70% 70–80% Brown: 40–50% 50–60% 60–70% 70–80%
U.S. senator before election
Scott Brown
Republican
Elected U.S. senator
Elizabeth Warren
Democratic

Incumbent Republican Scott Brown ran for re-election to a first full term. He had been elected in a special election in 2010 following the death of incumbent Democrat Ted Kennedy. Brown faced no challengers from his own party. For the Democrats, an initial wide field of prospective candidates narrowed after the entry of Harvard Law School Professor Elizabeth Warren, the architect of the Consumer Financial Protection Bureau. Warren clinched near-unanimous party support, with all but one of the other Democratic candidates withdrawing following her entrance. After winning her party's nomination, eliminating any need for a primary, she faced Brown in the general election.

The election was one of the most-followed races in 2012 and cost approximately $82 million, which made it the most expensive election in Massachusetts history and the second-most expensive in the entire 2012 election cycle, next to that year's presidential election. This was despite the two candidates' having agreed not to allow outside money to influence the race. Opinion polling indicated a close race for much of the campaign, though Warren opened up a small but consistent lead in the final few weeks. She went on to defeat Brown by over 236,000 votes, 54% to 46%.

Democratic U.S. senator Ted Kennedy was re-elected in 2006, and died on August 25, 2009, from a malignant brain tumor. On September 24, 2009, Massachusetts Governor Deval Patrick appointed longtime friend of Kennedy and former Democratic National Committee Chairman Paul G. Kirk to succeed Kennedy until a special election could be held. Kirk's appointment was especially controversial, as the Governor's ability to appoint an interim senator was removed during the Romney administration by the Democratic-controlled legislature, as a precaution if senator and presidential nominee John Kerry was elected President in 2004. Laws surrounding Senate appointment were quickly changed following Kennedy's death. The Massachusetts Republican Party sued in an attempt to halt Kirk's appointment, but it was rejected by Suffolk Superior Court Judge Thomas Connolly.

In the special election held January 19, 2010, Republican State senator Scott Brown defeated Democratic State Attorney General Martha Coakley in an upset victory. Brown thus became the first Republican to be elected from Massachusetts to the United States Senate since Edward Brooke in 1972 and he began serving the remainder of Kennedy's term on February 4, 2010.

Incumbent Scott Brown faced no challenges from within his party. The political action committee National Republican Trust, a group integral to Brown's election in 2010, vowed to draft a challenger for Brown but were unable to find one.

Massachusetts Republican primary
| Party | Candidate | Votes | % |
|---|---|---|---|
| Republican | Scott Brown | 133,860 | 99.46 |
| Republican | Write-ins | 733 | 0.54 |
| Total votes | | 134,593 | 100.00 |

The Massachusetts Democratic Convention was held June 2, 2012, where Warren received 95.77% of delegate votes. As the only candidate with 15% of delegate votes necessary to qualify for the primary ballot, Warren eliminated her challenger Marisa DeFranco, becoming the de facto nominee. The Democratic primary was held September 6, 2012, with Warren running unopposed.

Democratic primary vote
| Party | Candidate | Votes | % |
|---|---|---|---|
| Democratic | Elizabeth Warren | 308,979 | 97.59 |
| Democratic | Write-ins | 7,638 | 2.41 |
| Total votes | | 316,617 | 100.00 |

Brown ran as a moderate, stressing his ability to cross party lines and highlighting his votes for the Dodd-Frank financial reform law and to repeal "don't ask, don't tell". Warren campaigned on a platform championing the middle class, and supporting Wall Street regulation. Warren criticized Brown for continually voting with Republican leadership, and argued that he was not the bipartisan moderate he claimed to be. A staple of Brown's attack tactics against Warren was his consistent reference to her as "Professor Warren", in attempt to portray her as an elitist academic. Brown faced blowback after the second debate, during which he claimed conservative Antonin Scalia was a "model" Supreme Court Justice, prompting boos from the debate audience.

Warren spoke at the 2012 Democratic National Convention immediately before Bill Clinton on the penultimate night of the convention. Warren contrasted President Obama's economic plan with Mitt Romney's in the 2012 election and rebuked the Republican Party's economic policy stating: "Their vision is clear: 'I've got mine, and the rest of you are on your own.'" Warren positioned herself as a champion of a beleaguered middle class that, as she said, "has been chipped, squeezed and hammered." Brown attended the 2012 Republican National Convention, but was not a speaker there. According to Brown, he had rejected an offer to play a larger role, and limited his attendance to a single day because of scheduling demands.

Following Todd Akin's controversial "legitimate rape" comments, Brown was the first sitting senator to demand he drop out of the Missouri U.S. Senate race. He also called on his Party to "recognize in its platform that you can be pro-choice and still be a good Republican." Brown's campaign had been endorsed by many Massachusetts Democrats, many of whom were prominently featured in his campaign ads.

In September 2011, a video of Warren explaining her approach to economic policy gained popularity on the internet. In the video, Warren rebuts the charge that asking the rich to pay more taxes is "class warfare", pointing out that no one grew rich in America without depending on infrastructure paid for by the rest of society, stating:

There is nobody in this country who got rich on his own. Nobody. ... You moved your goods to market on the roads the rest of us paid for; you hired workers the rest of us paid to educate; you were safe in your factory because of police forces and fire forces that the rest of us paid for. You didn't have to worry that marauding bands would come and seize everything at your factory, and hire someone to protect against this, because of the work the rest of us did. Now look, you built a factory and it turned into something terrific, or a great idea. God bless. Keep a big hunk of it. But part of the underlying social contract is, you take a hunk of that and pay forward for the next kid who comes along.

On July 13, 2012, President Obama sparked a controversy when he echoed her thoughts in a campaign speech saying, "Somebody helped to create this unbelievable American system that we have that allowed you to thrive. Somebody invested in roads and bridges. If you've got a business—you didn't build that. Somebody else made that happen."

Warren encountered significant opposition from business interests. In August 2012, Rob Engstrom, political director for the United States Chamber of Commerce, claimed that "no other candidate in 2012 represents a greater threat to free enterprise than Professor Warren." She nonetheless raised $39 million for her campaign, the most of any Senate candidate in 2012.

Despite President Obama's winning the state easily, and winning all of the state's counties, this race was fairly close. As expected, Warren performed very well in Suffolk County, which is home to the state's largest city and its capital Boston. Brown performed well in the southern part of the state near Cape Cod. Warren made history by becoming the first woman elected to the U.S. Senate in the state of Massachusetts.

Massachusetts general election
| Party | Candidate | Votes | % | ±% |
|---|---|---|---|---|
| Democratic | Elizabeth Warren | 1,696,346 | 53.74% | ▲6.6% |
| Republican | Scott Brown (incumbent) | 1,458,048 | 46.19% | ▼4.9% |
| All others | | 2,159 | 0.07% | ▼0.9% |
| Majority | | 236,139 | 7.48% | |
| Turnout | | 3,156,553 | | |
| Democratic gain from Republican | | Swing | ▲6.2% | |

== Michigan ==
Michigan election
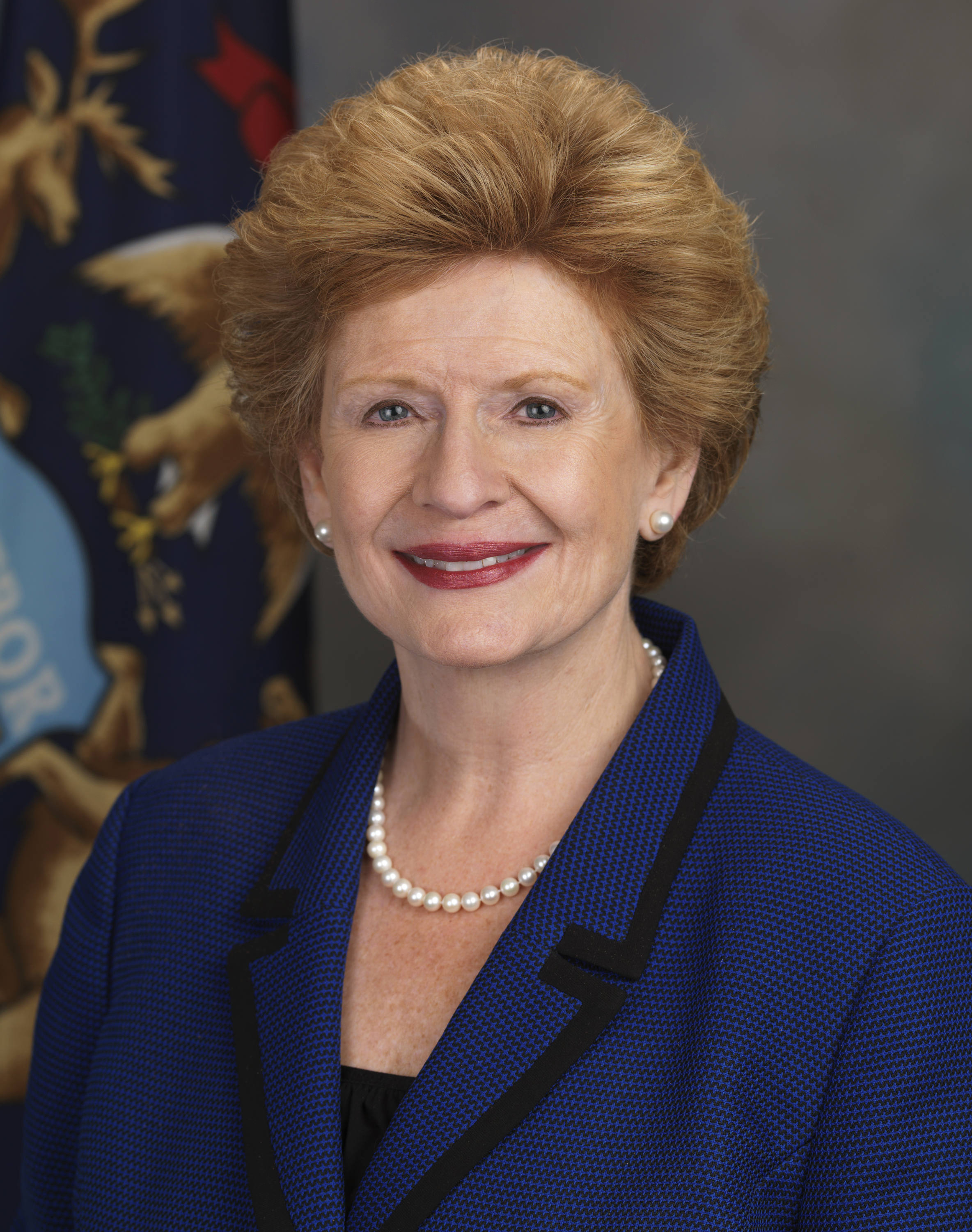

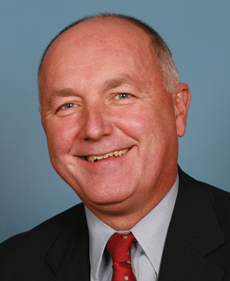
| Nominee | Debbie Stabenow | Pete Hoekstra |
| Party | Democratic | Republican |
| Popular vote | 2,735,826 | 1,767,386 |
| Percentage | 58.80% | 37.98% |
- Stabenow: 40–50% 50–60% 60–70% 70–80% Hoekstra: 40–50% 50–60% 60–70%
U.S. senator before election
Debbie Stabenow
Democratic
Elected U.S. senator
Debbie Stabenow
Democratic

Incumbent Democrat Debbie Stabenow was re-elected to a third term after being unopposed in the Democratic primary. The Republican nominee was former Congressman Pete Hoekstra. Stabenow defeated Hoekstra by a landslide 21% margin and by almost one million votes.

Michigan Democratic primary
| Party | Candidate | Votes | % |
|---|---|---|---|
| Democratic | Debbie Stabenow (incumbent) | 702,773 | 100.00 |
| Total votes | | 702,773 | 100.00% |

The GOP primary campaign was mainly a battle between Hoekstra and Durant as they were the most visible in running campaign ads. Despite Durant's attack ads, Hoekstra was leading in the polls for the Republican nomination.

Republican primary results
| Party | Candidate | Votes | % |
|---|---|---|---|
| Republican | Pete Hoekstra | 398,793 | 54.2 |
| Republican | Clark Durant | 246,584 | 33.5 |
| Republican | Randy Hekman | 49,080 | 6.7 |
| Republican | Gary Glenn | 40,726 | 5.5 |
| Total votes | | 735,183 | 100.0 |

Michigan general election
| Party | Candidate | Votes | % | ±% |
|---|---|---|---|---|
| Democratic | Debbie Stabenow (incumbent) | 2,735,826 | 58.8 | +1.9% |
| Republican | Pete Hoekstra | 1,767,386 | 38.0 | −3.3% |
| Libertarian | Scotty Boman | 84,480 | 1.8 | +1.1% |
| Green | Harley Mikkelson | 27,890 | 0.6 | − |
| Constitution | Richard Matkin | 26,038 | 0.6 | +0.1% |
| Natural Law | John Litle | 11,229 | 0.2 | +0.1% |
| Others | Write-in | 69 | 0.0 | − |
| Majority | | 968,440 | 20.8 | |
| Turnout | | 4,652,918 | | |
| Democratic hold | | Swing | 2.6% | |

== Minnesota ==
Minnesota election
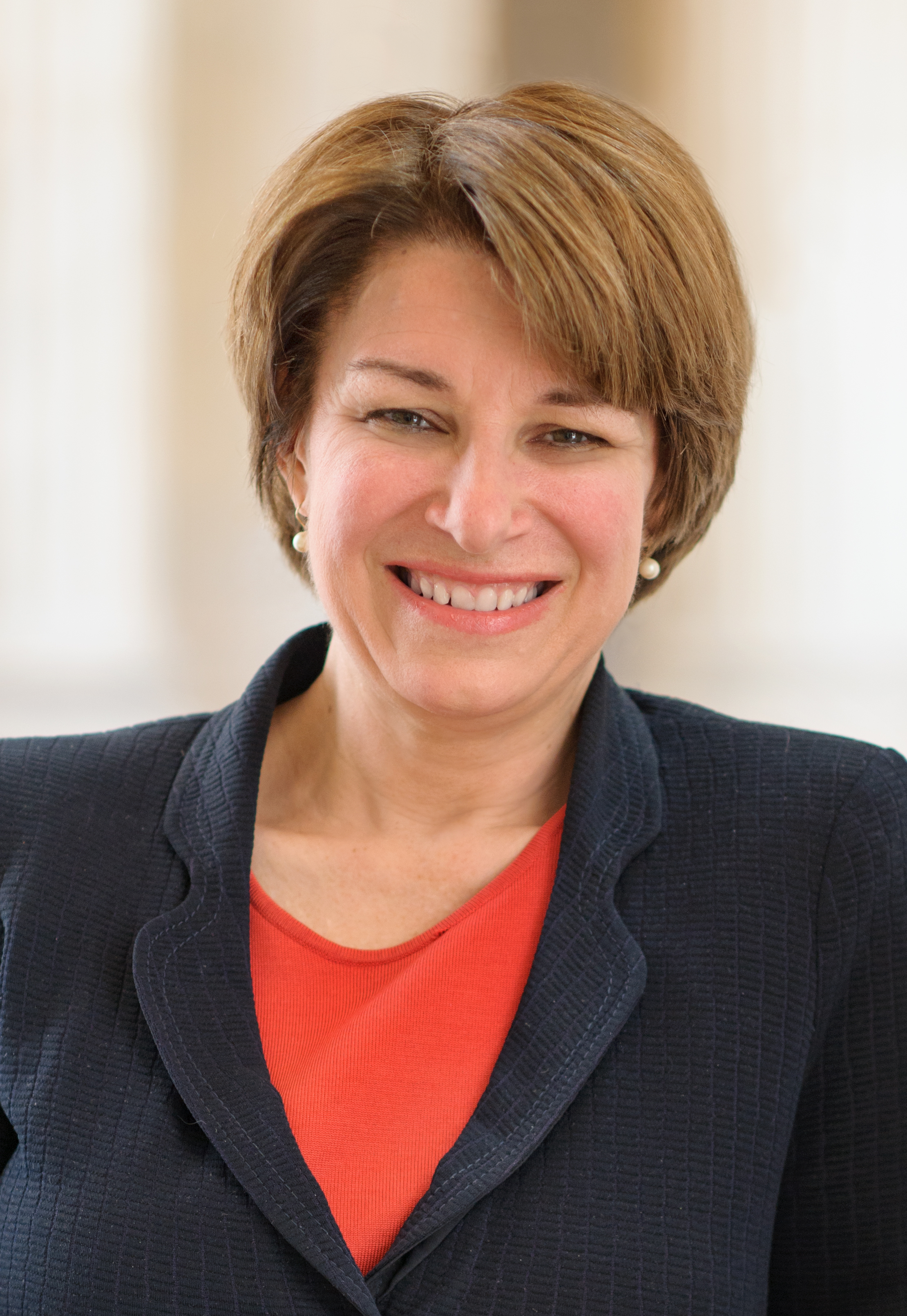

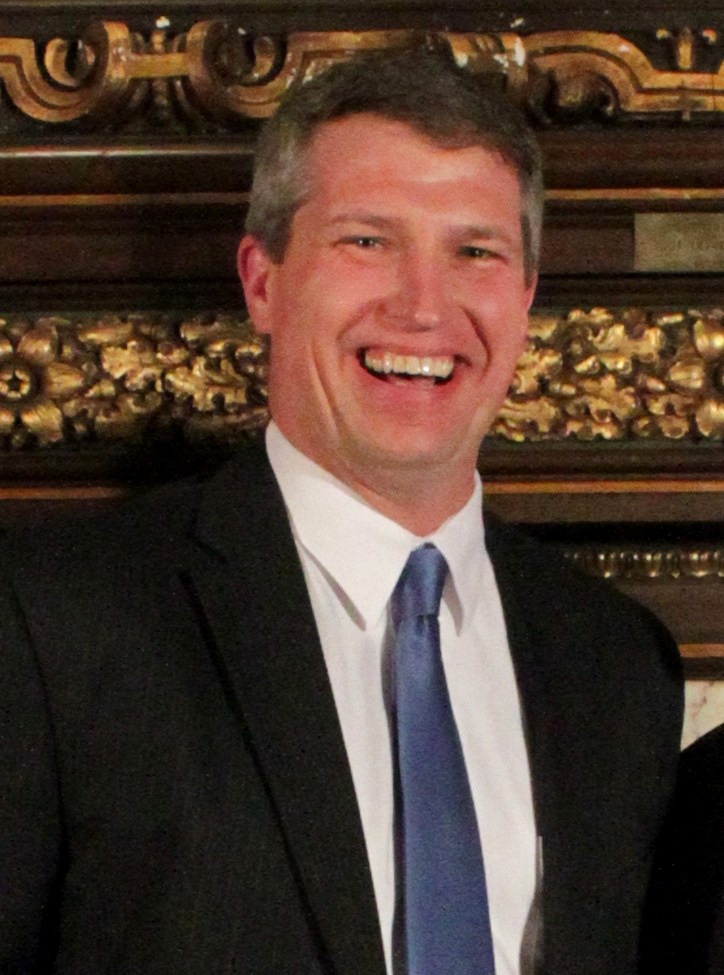
| Nominee | Amy Klobuchar | Kurt Bills |
| Party | Democratic (DFL) | Republican |
| Popular vote | 1,854,595 | 867,874 |
| Percentage | 65.2% | 30.5% |
- Klobuchar: 50–60% 60–70% 70–80% Bills: 40–50%
U.S. senator before election
Amy Klobuchar
Democratic (DFL)
Elected U.S. senator
Amy Klobuchar
Democratic (DFL)

Incumbent Democrat Amy Klobuchar was re-elected to a second term in a landslide, defeating the Republican nominee, State Representative Kurt Bills by almost one million votes, and carrying all but two of the state's counties.

Incumbent Amy Klobuchar was first elected in 2006 to succeed the retiring DFL incumbent Mark Dayton.

Democratic-Farmer-Labor primary results
| Party | Candidate | Votes | % |
|---|---|---|---|
| Democratic (DFL) | Amy Klobuchar | 183,702 | 90.79 |
| Democratic (DFL) | Dick Franson | 6,832 | 3.38 |
| Democratic (DFL) | Jack Shepard | 6,638 | 3.28 |
| Democratic (DFL) | Darryl Stanton | 5,160 | 2.55 |
| Total votes | | 202,332 | 100.00 |

Minnesota Republican primary
| Party | Candidate | Votes | % |
|---|---|---|---|
| Republican | Kurt Bills | 63,380 | 51.12 |
| Republican | David Carlson | 43,847 | 35.37 |
| Republican | Bob Carney, Jr. | 16,755 | 13.51 |
| Total votes | | 123,982 | 100.00 |

The Independence Party of Minnesota did not plan to run a candidate in the general election. Party chairman Mark Jenkins said in November 2011 that he saw the Senate election as "a distraction from having our best and brightest engaged in state legislative races". At the party's convention in June 2012, neither candidate was endorsed although Williams won a majority of the votes and came within two votes of the required 60% needed for the party's endorsement. He proceeded with his run for the Senate but the party focused its attention on state legislative races.

Minnesota general election
| Party | Candidate | Votes | % | ±% |
|---|---|---|---|---|
| Democratic (DFL) | Amy Klobuchar (incumbent) | 1,852,526 | 65.2 | +7.1% |
| Republican | Kurt Bills | 869,089 | 30.6 | −7.3% |
| Independence | Stephen Williams | 73,559 | 2.6 | −0.6% |
| Grassroots | Tim Davis | 30,465 | 1.1 | n/a |
| Minnesota Open Progressive Party | Michael Cavlan | 13,933 | 0.5 | n/a |
| Majority | | 983,437 | 34.6 | +14.4% |
| Democratic (DFL) hold | | Swing | | |

== Mississippi ==
Mississippi election
- Turnout: 59.7% (voting eligible)
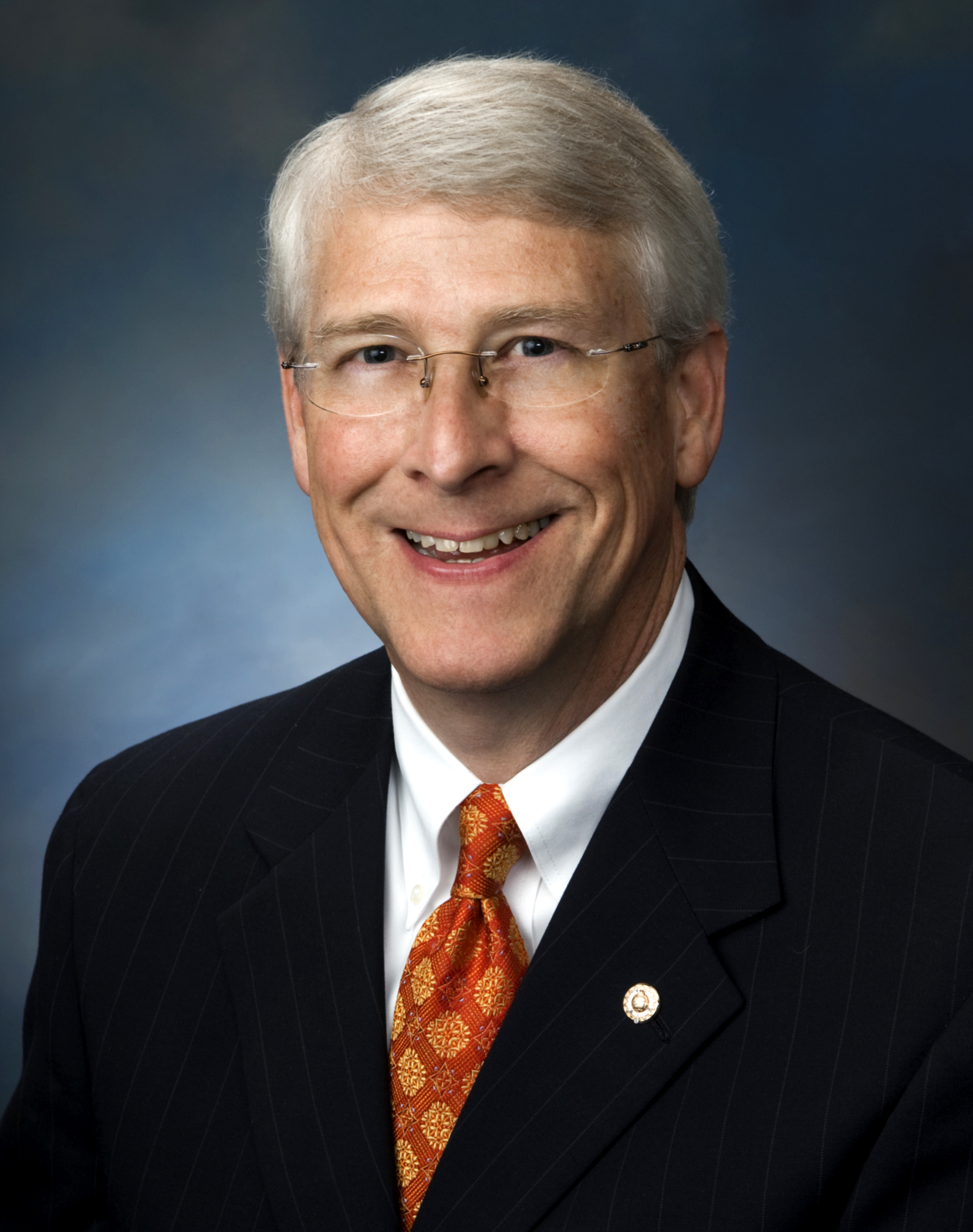

| Nominee | Roger Wicker | Albert N. Gore |
| Party | Republican | Democratic |
| Popular vote | 709,626 | 503,467 |
| Percentage | 57.2% | 40.6% |
- County results Wicker: 50–60% 60–70% 70–80% 80–90% Gore: 40-50% 50–60% 60–70% 70–80% 80–90%
U.S. senator before election
Roger Wicker
Republican
Elected U.S. senator
Roger Wicker
Republican

Incumbent Republican Roger Wicker won re-election to his first full term over Democrat Albert N. Gore. Former U.S. representative Roger Wicker was appointed by Governor Haley Barbour after then-incumbent Trent Lott resigned at the end of 2007. A 2008 special election was later scheduled to determine who would serve the remainder of the term. Wicker defeated former Mississippi Governor Ronnie Musgrove with 54.96% of the vote in the special election.

Mississippi Republican primary
| Party | Candidate | Votes | % |
|---|---|---|---|
| Republican | Roger Wicker | 254,936 | 89.17 |
| Republican | Robert Maloney | 18,857 | 6.60 |
| Republican | Allen Hathcock | 12,106 | 4.23 |
| Total votes | | 285,899 | 100.00 |

Mississippi Democratic primary
| Party | Candidate | Votes | % |
|---|---|---|---|
| Democratic | Albert Gore | 49,157 | 56.77 |
| Democratic | Roger Weiner | 21,131 | 24.40 |
| Democratic | Will Oatis | 16,300 | 18.83 |
| Total votes | | 86,588 | 100.00 |

Mississippi general election
| Party | Candidate | Votes | % | ±% |
|---|---|---|---|---|
| Republican | Roger Wicker (incumbent) | 709,626 | 57.16 | |
| Democratic | Albert Gore | 503,467 | 40.55 | |
| Constitution | Thomas Cramer | 15,281 | 1.23 | |
| Reform | Shawn O'Hara | 13,194 | 1.06 | |
| Majority | | 206,159 | 16.6 | |
| Turnout | | 1,241,568 | | |

== Missouri ==
2012 United States Senate election in Missouri
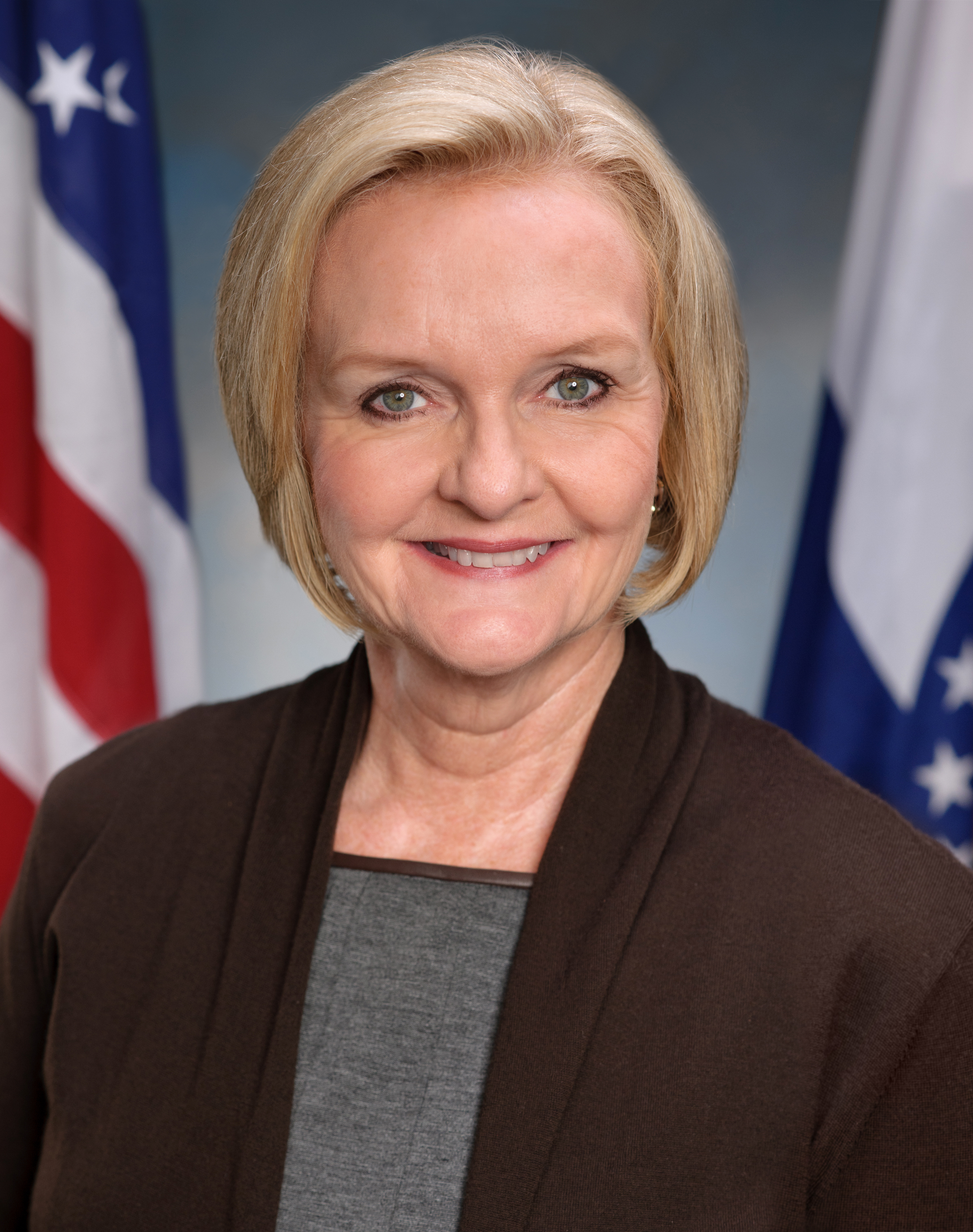

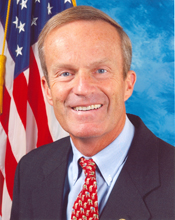
| Nominee | Claire McCaskill | Todd Akin |
| Party | Democratic | Republican |
| Popular vote | 1,484,683 | 1,063,698 |
| Percentage | 54.8% | 39.1% |
| Nominee | Jonathan Dine |
| Party | Libertarian |
| Popular vote | 164,991 |
| Percentage | 6.1% |
- McCaskill: 40–50% 50–60% 60–70% 70-80% 80–90% Akin: 40–50% 50–60% 60–70%
U.S. senator before election
Claire McCaskill
Democratic
Elected U.S. senator
Claire McCaskill
Democratic

Incumbent Democrat Claire McCaskill was unopposed in her primary and U.S. Representative Todd Akin won the Republican nomination with a plurality in a close three-way race. McCaskill was re-elected to a second term.

Time featured the race in their Senate article. Similar to other races, the article mentioned how McCaskill was fading in pre-election polls, and she was considered the most vulnerable/endangered Democratic incumbent that year. But Akin's comments about a woman's body preventing pregnancy if it was "legitimate rape" quickly shot McCaskill back up, winning her the election.

Missouri Democratic primary
| Party | Candidate | Votes | % |
|---|---|---|---|
| Democratic | Claire McCaskill (incumbent) | 289,481 | 100.00 |
| Total votes | | 289,481 | 100.00 |

The Republican primary, held August 7, 2012, was one of the three most anticipated of summer 2012. This was due to the projected closeness of the Federal races in Missouri in November 2012, and the potential to change the control of the Senate in January 2013. Democrats believed that Todd Akin would be the weakest among the likely challengers for the Senate seat, and ads attacking him as "too conservative" were largely viewed as a veiled support for his nomination.

Missouri Republican primary
| Party | Candidate | Votes | % |
|---|---|---|---|
| Republican | Todd Akin | 217,404 | 36.05 |
| Republican | John Brunner | 180,788 | 29.98 |
| Republican | Sarah Steelman | 176,127 | 29.20 |
| Republican | Jerry Beck | 9,801 | 1.62 |
| Republican | Hector Maldonado | 7,410 | 1.23 |
| Republican | Robert Poole | 6,100 | 1.01 |
| Republican | Mark Memoly | 3,205 | 0.53 |
| Republican | Mark Lodes | 2,285 | 0.38 |
| Total votes | | 603,120 | 100.00 |

Libertarian primary results
| Party | Candidate | Votes | % |
|---|---|---|---|
| Libertarian | Jonathan Dine | 2,470 | 100.00 |
| Total votes | | 2,470 | 100.00 |

While making remarks on rape and abortion on August 19, 2012, Akin made the claim that women victims of what he described as "legitimate rape" rarely experience pregnancy from rape. In an interview aired on St. Louis television station KTVI-TV, Aiken was asked his views on whether women who became pregnant due to rape should have the option of abortion. He replied:

Well you know, people always want to try to make that as one of those things, well how do you, how do you slice this particularly tough sort of ethical question. First of all, from what I understand from doctors, that's really rare. If it's a legitimate rape, the female body has ways to try to shut that whole thing down. But let's assume that maybe that didn't work or something. I think there should be some punishment, but the punishment ought to be on the rapist and not attacking the child.

The comments from Akin almost immediately led to uproar, with the term "legitimate rape" being taken to imply belief in a view that some kinds of rape are "legitimate", or alternatively that the many victims who do become pregnant from rape are likely to be lying about their claim. His claims about the likelihood of pregnancy resulting from rape were widely seen as being based on long-discredited pseudoscience with experts seeing the claims as lacking any basis of medical validity. Akin was not the first to make such claims, but was perhaps one of the most prominent. While some voices such as Iowa congressman Steve King supported Akin, senior figures in both parties condemned his remarks and some Republicans called for him to resign. In the resulting furor, Akin received widespread calls to drop out of his Senate race from both Republicans and Democrats. Akin apologized after making the comment, saying he "misspoke", and he stated he planned to remain in the Senate race. This response was itself attacked by many commentators who saw the initial comments as representative of his long-held views, rather than an accidental gaffe.

The comment was widely characterized as misogynistic and recklessly inaccurate, with many commentators remarking on the use of the words "legitimate rape". Related news articles cited a 1996 article in an obstetrics and gynecology journal, which found that 5% of women who were raped became pregnant, which equaled about 32,000 pregnancies each year in the US alone. A separate 2003 article in the journal Human Nature estimated that rapes are twice as likely to result in pregnancies as consensual sex. (See also pregnancy from rape.)

The incident was seen as having an impact on Akin's senate race and the Republicans' chances of gaining a majority in the U.S. Senate, by making news in the week before the 2012 Republican National Convention and by "shift[ing] the national discussion to divisive social issues that could repel swing voters rather than economic issues that could attract them". Akin, along with other Republican candidates with controversial positions on rape, lost due to backlash from women voters.

On October 20, at a fundraiser, Akin compared McCaskill to a dog. After being criticized, Akin's campaign aide wrote on his official Twitter page that if Claire McCaskill "were a dog, she'd be a 'Bullshitsu.'" The aide later said that he was joking. Akin was caught on tape commenting that "Sen. Claire McCaskill goes to Washington, D.C., to 'fetch' higher taxes and regulations."

Even though the last poll before the election showed Akin only losing by four percentage points, McCaskill defeated him handily, by a 15.5% margin of victory and a vote margin of 420,985. Both McCaskill and incumbent governor Jay Nixon, running at the same time, were able to get a large number of votes from rural parts of the state, something President Barack Obama was not able to do. McCaskill and Nixon were declared the winners of their respective races even before the known big Democratic strongholds of St. Louis and Kansas City came in. Akin conceded defeat to McCaskill at 10:38 P.M. Central Time.

Missouri general election
| Party | Candidate | Votes | % | ±% |
|---|---|---|---|---|
| Democratic | Claire McCaskill (incumbent) | 1,484,683 | 54.71 | +5.13% |
| Republican | Todd Akin | 1,063,698 | 39.20 | −8.11% |
| Libertarian | Jonathan Dine | 164,991 | 6.08 | +3.83% |
| Write-ins | | 251 | 0.01 | n/a |
| Margin of victory | | 420,985 | 15.51 | +13.24% |
| Turnout | | 2,713,623 | 64.75 | |

Note: The ±% column reflects the change in total number of votes won by each party from the previous election. Turnout percentage is the portion of registered voters (4,190,936 as of October 24, 2012) who voted.

== Montana ==
2012 United States Senate election in Montana
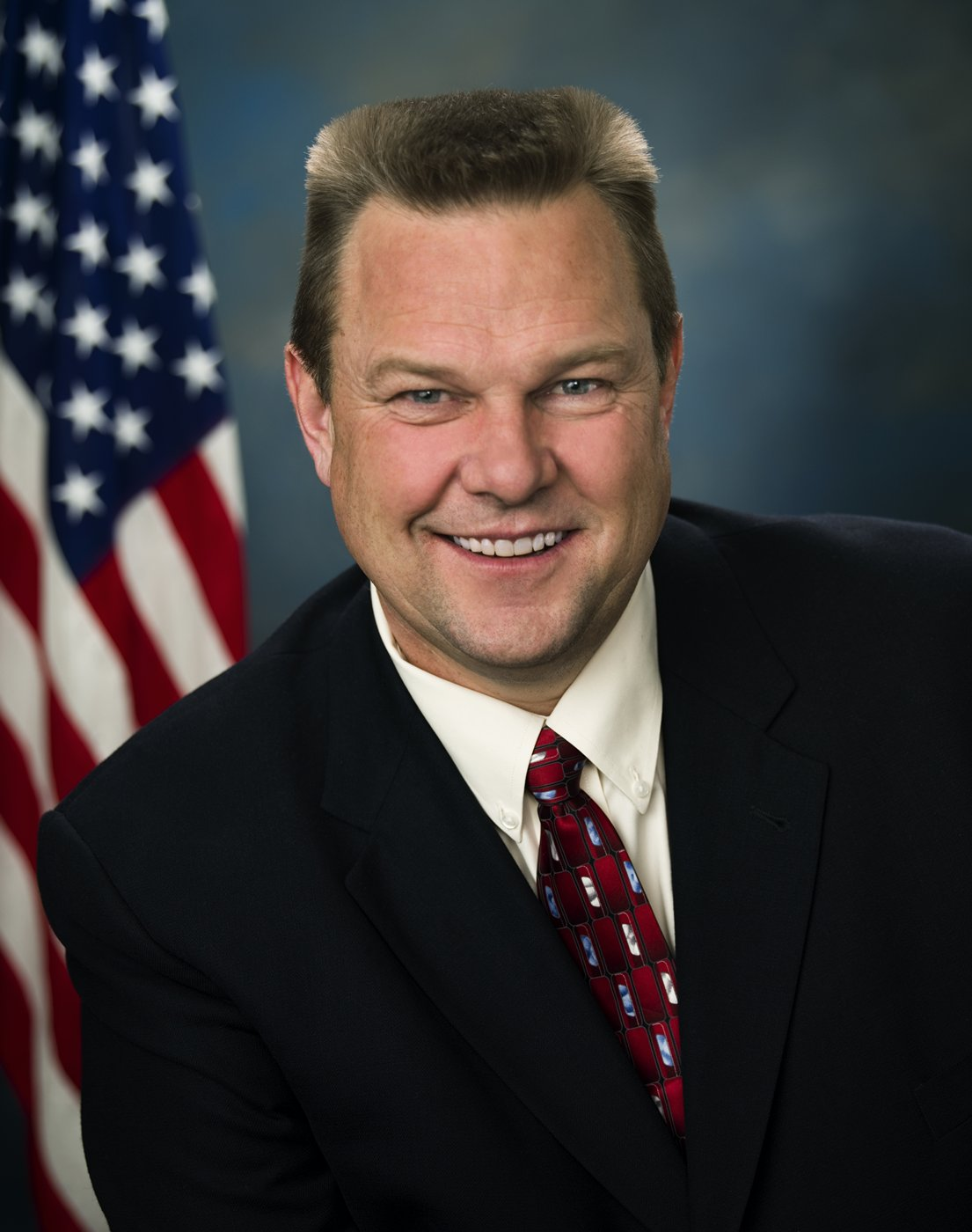

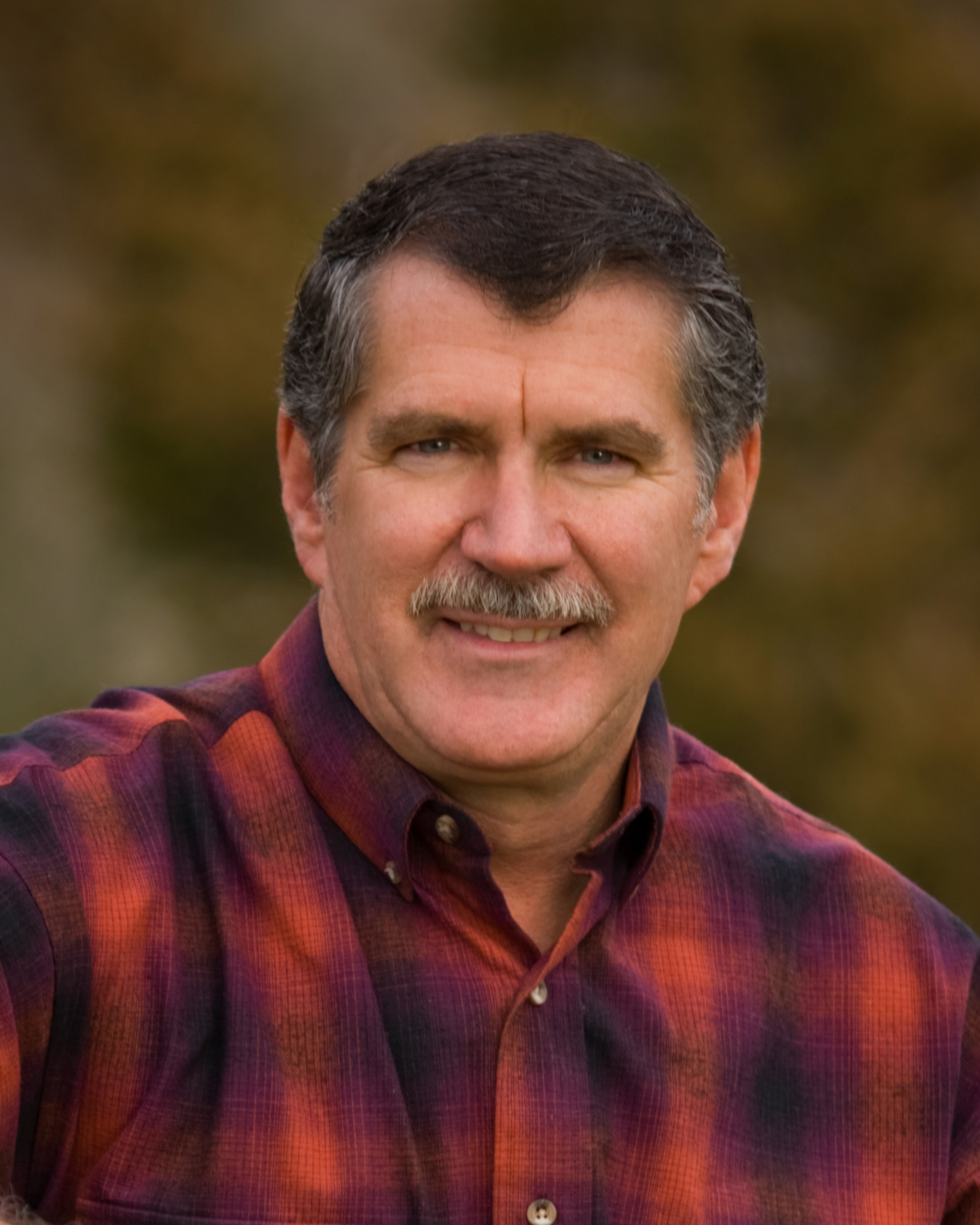
| Nominee | Jon Tester | Denny Rehberg |
| Party | Democratic | Republican |
| Popular vote | 236,123 | 218,051 |
| Percentage | 48.6% | 44.9% |
| Nominee | Dan Cox |
| Party | Libertarian |
| Popular vote | 31,892 |
| Percentage | 6.6% |
- County results Tester: 40–50% 50–60% 60–70% Rehberg: 40–50% 50–60% 60–70% 70–80%
U.S. senator before election
Jon Tester
Democratic
Elected U.S. senator
Jon Tester
Democratic

Incumbent Democrat Jon Tester successfully ran for re-election to a second term.

Montana Republican primary
| Party | Candidate | Votes | % |
|---|---|---|---|
| Republican | Denny Rehberg | 105,632 | 76.2 |
| Republican | Dennis Teske | 33,079 | 23.8 |
| Total votes | | 138,711 | 100.00 |

Former president of the Montana Senate and farmer Jon Tester was elected with 49.2% of the vote in 2006, defeating incumbent Conrad Burns.

As of June 30, 2011, Jon Tester had saved $2.34 million in campaign funds. Tester has been accused by Republican Denny Rehberg's senate campaign of depending on financial contributions from Wall Street banking executives and movie stars.

On February 5, 2011, U.S. Representative Denny Rehberg announced his intention to run for the U.S. Senate. Steve Daines had announced he would seek the Republican nomination on November 13, 2010, but just before Rehberg's announcement he dropped out of the primary and announced he would instead seek the Republican nomination for Montana's at-large congressional district in 2012.

As of early July 2010, Denny Rehberg had saved $1.5 million of an original $2 million in campaign funds. Rehberg accused Democrat Jon Tester's senate campaign of depending on financial contributions from Wall Street banking executives and Hollywood while Rehberg's campaign relies primarily on in state donations. Tester's campaign countered that Rehberg has been funded by petroleum special interests and Wall Street.

The National Republican Senatorial Committee aired an attack ad against Jon Tester that mistakenly included a digitally manipulated photo of Tester (who has only two fingers on his left hand) with full sets of fingers. Another ad against Tester, from the Karl Rove group Crossroads GPS, falsely asserted that Tester had voted in favor of Environmental Protection Agency regulation of farm dust. In fact, Tester had praised the EPA for not attempting such a regulation. The vote cited in the anti-Tester ad concerned currency exchange rates.

In early October 2012, Crossroads GPS announced it would launch a $16 million advertising buy in national races, of which four were this and three other Senate elections.

Montana general election
| Party | Candidate | Votes | % | ±% |
|---|---|---|---|---|
| Democratic | Jon Tester (incumbent) | 236,123 | 48.58 | −0.58% |
| Republican | Denny Rehberg | 218,051 | 44.86 | −3.43% |
| Libertarian | Dan Cox | 31,892 | 6.56 | +4.01% |
| Margin of victory | | 18,072 | 3.72 | +2.84% |
| Turnout | | 486,066 | | |
| Democratic hold | | Swing | | |

*Note: The ±% column reflects the change in the percent of the votes won by each party from the 2006 Senate election. Neither the vote shares nor turnout figure account for write-ins.

== Nebraska ==
2012 United States Senate election in Nebraska
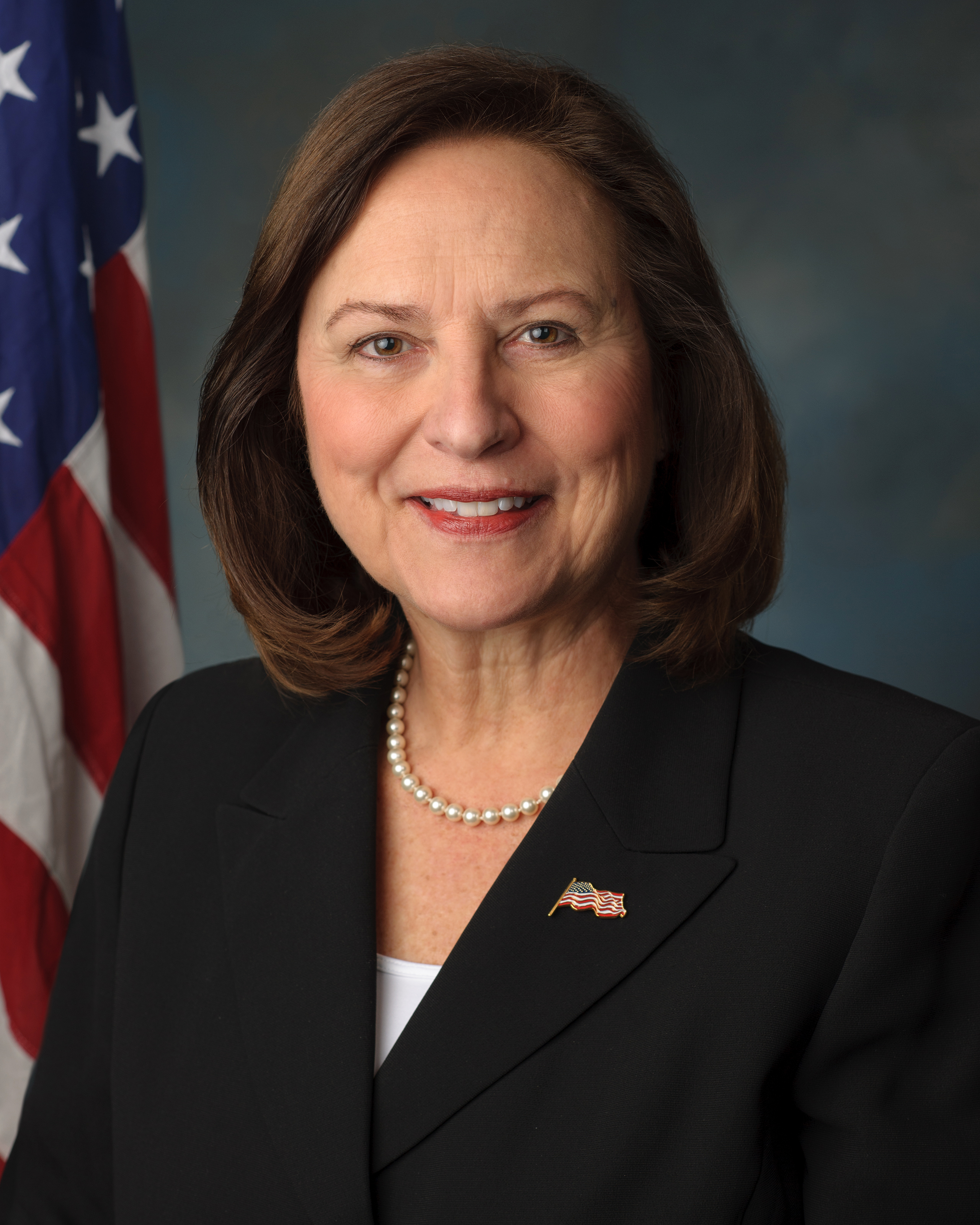

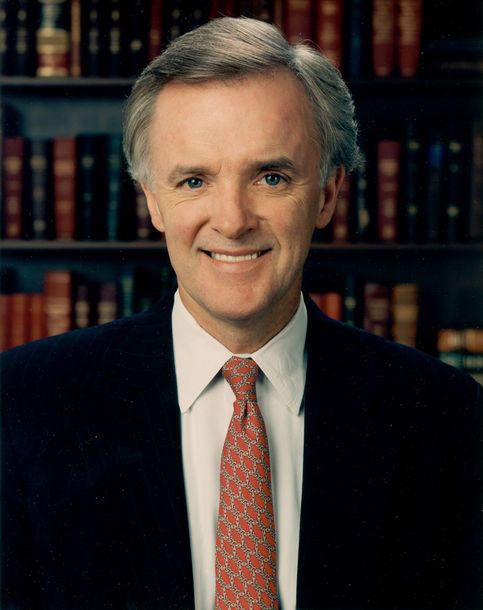
| Nominee | Deb Fischer | Bob Kerrey |
| Party | Republican | Democratic |
| Popular vote | 455,593 | 332,979 |
| Percentage | 57.8% | 42.2% |
- Fischer: 50–60% 60–70% 70–80% 80–90% Kerrey: 50–60%
U.S. senator before election
Ben Nelson
Democratic
Elected U.S. senator
Deb Fischer
Republican

Incumbent Democrat Ben Nelson retired instead of seeking a third term. Former U.S. senator Bob Kerrey, a Democrat, and state senator Deb Fischer, a Republican, won their respective parties' primary elections on May 15, 2012. Fischer won the general election with 58% of the vote.

Nebraska Democratic primary
| Party | Candidate | Votes | % |
|---|---|---|---|
| Democratic | Bob Kerrey | 66,586 | 81.0 |
| Democratic | Chuck Hassebrook | 9,886 | 12.0 |
| Democratic | Steven Lustgarten | 2,177 | 2.6 |
| Democratic | Larry Marvin | 2,076 | 2.5 |
| Democratic | Sherman Yates | 1,500 | 1.9 |
| Total votes | | 82,225 | 100.0 |

Nebraska Republican primary
| Party | Candidate | Votes | % |
|---|---|---|---|
| Republican | Deb Fischer | 79,941 | 41.0 |
| Republican | Jon Bruning | 70,067 | 35.9 |
| Republican | Don Stenberg | 36,727 | 18.8 |
| Republican | Pat Flynn | 5,413 | 2.8 |
| Republican | Spencer Zimmerman | 1,601 | 0.8 |
| Republican | Sharyn Elander | 1,294 | 0.7 |
| Total votes | | 195,043 | 100.0 |

Nebraska general election
| Party | Candidate | Votes | % |
|---|---|---|---|
| Republican | Deb Fischer | 455,593 | 57.8 |
| Democratic | Bob Kerrey | 332,979 | 42.2 |
| Total votes | | 788,572 | 100.0 |

== Nevada ==
Nevada election
- Turnout: 57.1% (voting eligible)
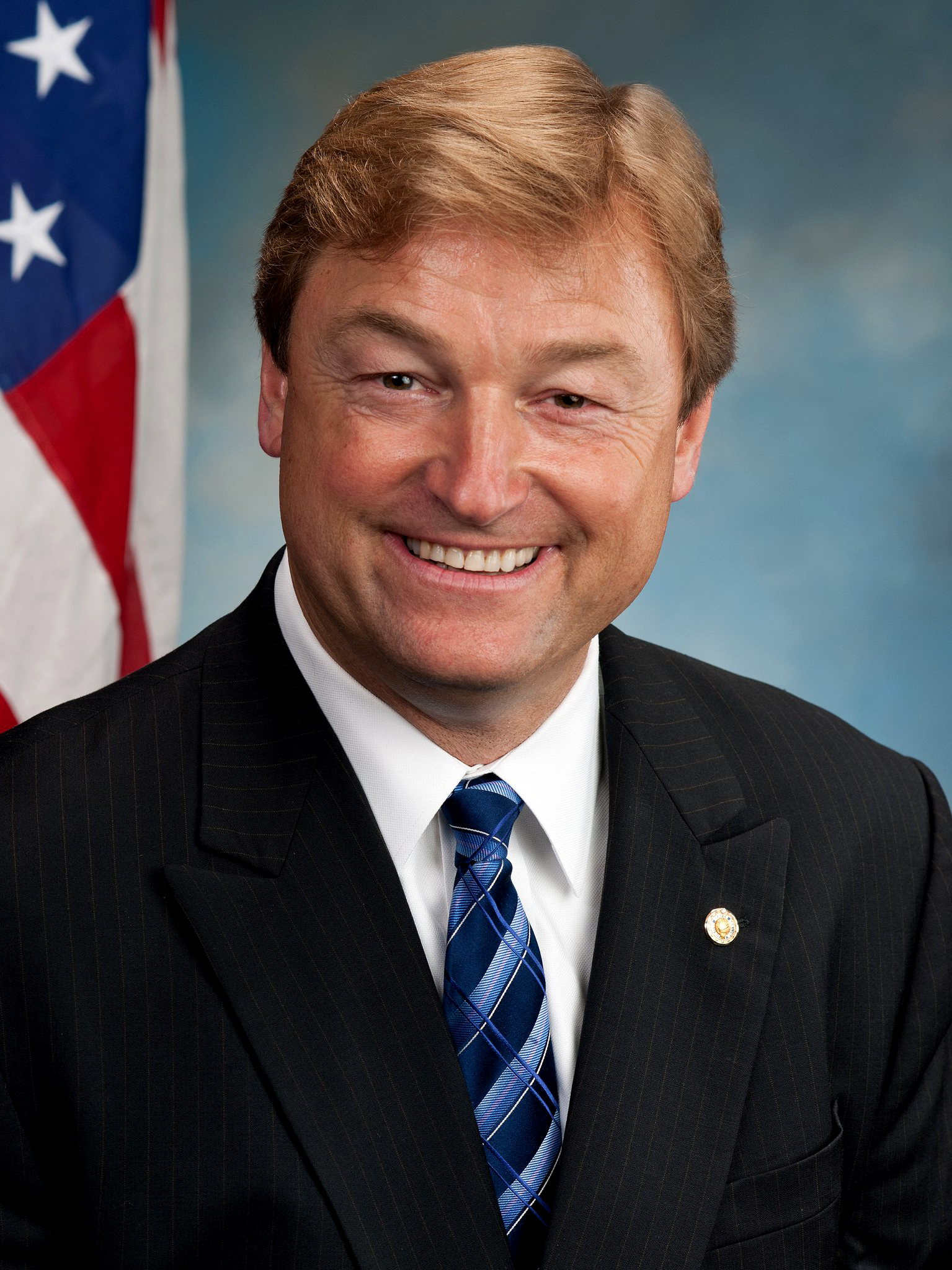

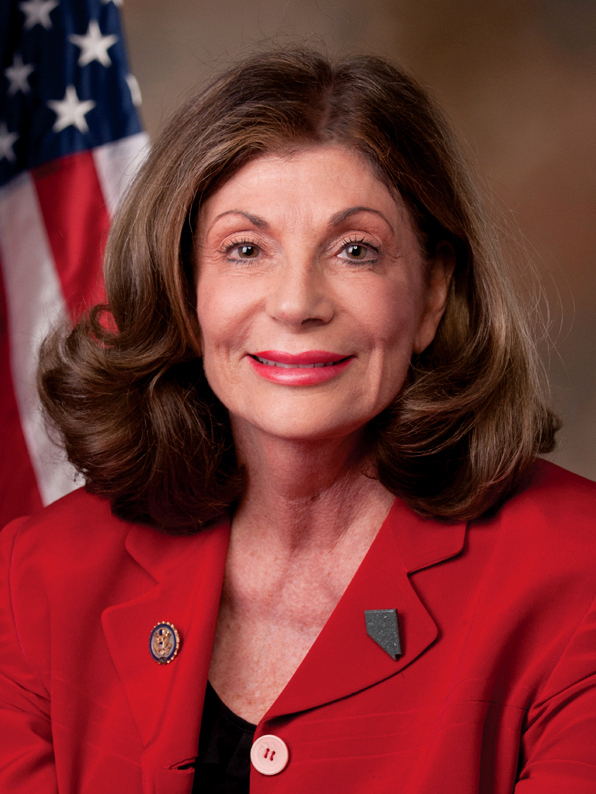
| Nominee | Dean Heller | Shelley Berkley |
| Party | Republican | Democratic |
| Popular vote | 457,656 | 446,080 |
| Percentage | 45.9% | 44.7% |
- Heller: 50–60% 60–70% 70–80% Berkley: 50–60%
U.S. senator before election
Dean Heller
Republican
Elected U.S. senator
Dean Heller
Republican

Incumbent Republican Dean Heller, who was recently appointed to this seat left vacant by resigning U.S. senator John Ensign, was narrowly elected to his first full term over Congresswoman Shelley Berkley.

Ensign had been re-elected in 2006 over Jack Carter, son of former president Jimmy Carter, by a margin of 55–41%. Ensign's re-election campaign was expected to be complicated after it was revealed in 2009 that he had been involved in an extramarital affair with the wife of one of his campaign staffers, allegedly made payments to the woman's family and arranged work for her husband to cover himself.

Ensign faced an investigation from the Senate Ethics Committee and his poll numbers declined significantly. There was speculation that Ensign might resign before the election, but he denied these charges and initially stated he would run. However, he changed his mind and on March 7, 2011, Ensign announced that he would not seek re-election. On April 22, Ensign announced that he was resigning effective May 3. This is the only senate election in 2012 to vote Republican while Obama carried it on the presidential level.

Nevada Republican primary
| Party | Candidate | Votes | % |
|---|---|---|---|
| Republican | Dean Heller (incumbent) | 88,958 | 86.3 |
| Republican | Sherry Brooks | 5,356 | 5.2 |
| | None of These Candidates | 3,358 | 3.3 |
| Republican | Eddie "In Liberty" Hamilton | 2,628 | 2.6 |
| Republican | Richard Charles | 2,295 | 2.2 |
| Republican | Carlo "Nakusa" Poliak | 512 | 0.5 |
| Total votes | | 103,107 | 100.0 |

Nevada Democratic primary
| Party | Candidate | Votes | % |
|---|---|---|---|
| Democratic | Shelley Berkley | 62,081 | 79.5 |
| Democratic | Nancy Price | 4,210 | 5.4 |
| Democratic | Steve Brown | 3,998 | 5.1 |
| | None of These Candidates | 3,637 | 4.7 |
| Democratic | Barry Ellsworth | 2,491 | 3.2 |
| Democratic | Louis Macias | 1,714 | 2.2 |
| Total votes | | 78,131 | 100.0 |

2012 United States Senate election in Nevada
| Party | Candidate | Votes | % | ±% |
|---|---|---|---|---|
| Republican | Dean Heller (incumbent) | 457,656 | 45.87 | −9.53% |
| Democratic | Shelley Berkley | 446,080 | 44.71 | +3.71% |
| Independent American | David Lory VanDerBeek | 48,792 | 4.89 | +3.56% |
| | None of These Candidates | 44,277 | 4.54 | +3.13% |
| Majority | | 12,034 | 1.20 | |
| Turnout | | 997,805 | | |
| Republican hold | | | | |

== New Jersey ==
New Jersey election
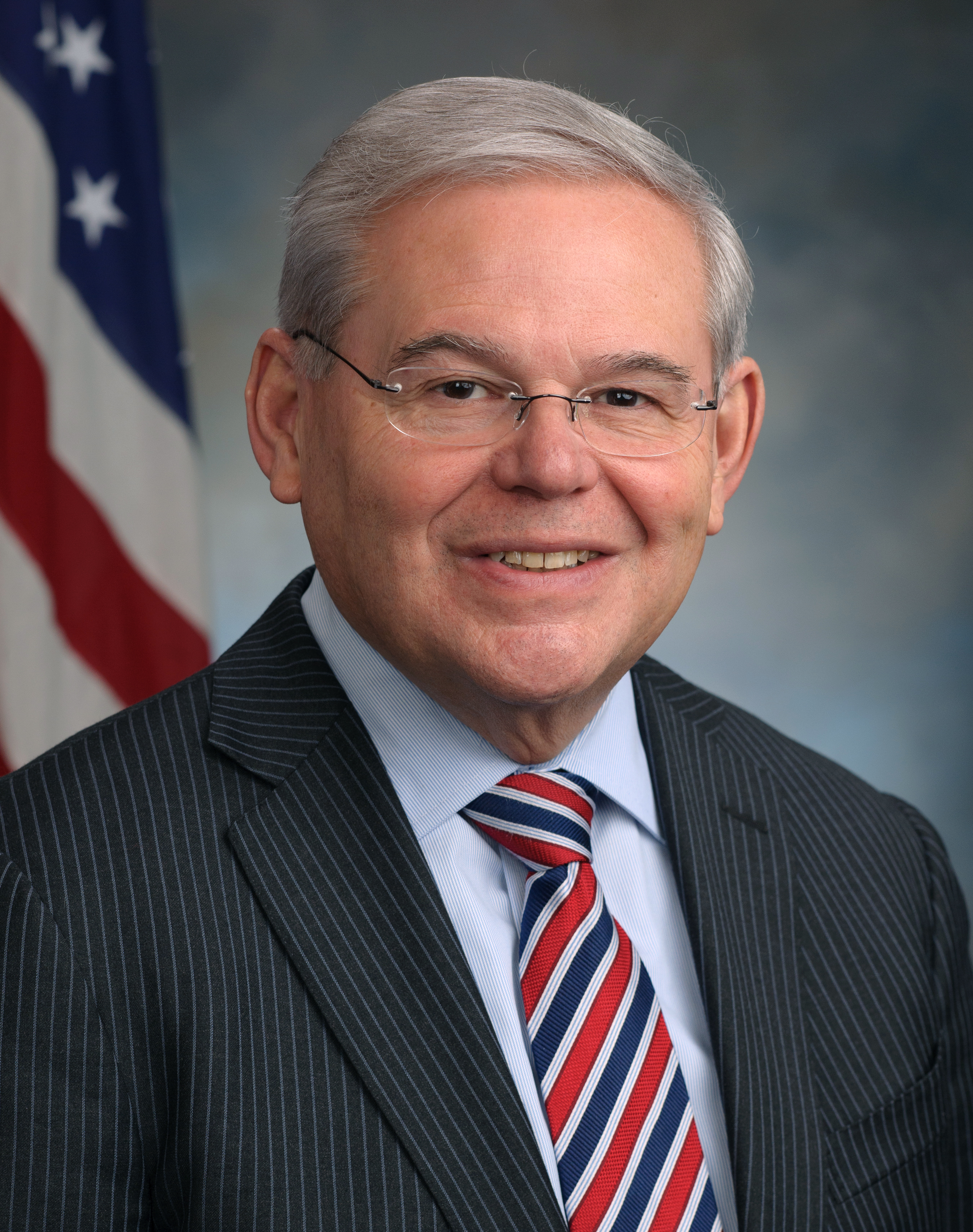

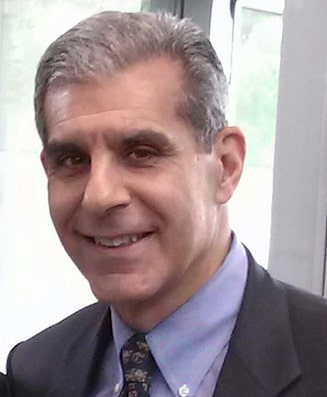
| Nominee | Bob Menendez | Joe Kyrillos |
| Party | Democratic | Republican |
| Popular vote | 1,987,680 | 1,329,534 |
| Percentage | 58.9% | 39.4% |
- Menendez: 40–50% 50–60% 60–70% 70–80% 80–90% >90% Kyrillos: 40–50% 50–60% 60–70% 70–80% >90%
U.S. senator before election
Bob Menendez
Democratic
Elected U.S. senator
Bob Menendez
Democratic

Incumbent Democrat Bob Menendez won re-election to a second full term. This was the first time since 1976 that a candidate for this seat received over 55% of the vote. Bob Menendez became the first Hispanic-American U.S. senator to represent New Jersey in January 2006 when former U.S. senator Jon Corzine appointed him to the seat after having resigned to become governor of New Jersey, following his election in November 2005. In November 2006, after a tough and painful election, Menendez defeated Republican state senator Thomas Kean, Jr. with 53.3% of the vote.

New Jersey Democratic primary
| Party | Candidate | Votes | % |
|---|---|---|---|
| Democratic | Bob Menendez (incumbent) | 235,321 | 100.0 |
| Total votes | | 235,321 | 100.0 |

New Jersey Republican primary
| Party | Candidate | Votes | % |
|---|---|---|---|
| Republican | Joseph Kyrillos | 161,146 | 77.1 |
| Republican | David Brown | 18,671 | 8.9 |
| Republican | Joseph Rullo | 16,690 | 8.0 |
| Republican | Bader Qarmout | 12,637 | 6.0 |
| Total votes | | 209,144 | 100.0 |

New Jersey general election
| Party | Candidate | Votes | % | ±% |
|---|---|---|---|---|
| Democratic | Bob Menendez (incumbent) | 1,987,680 | 58.87% | +5.50% |
| Republican | Joseph Kyrillos | 1,329,534 | 39.37% | −4.98% |
| Libertarian | Kenneth R. Kaplan | 16,803 | 0.50% | −0.15% |
| Green | Ken Wolski | 15,801 | 0.47% | |
| Independent | Gwen Diakos | 9,359 | 0.28% | |
| Independent | J. David Dranikoff | 3,834 | 0.11% | |
| Independent | Inder "Andy" Soni | 3,593 | 0.11% | |
| Independent | Robert "Turk" Turkavage | 3,532 | 0.10% | |
| Socialist | Greg Pason | 2,249 | 0.07% | |
| Independent | Eugene M. LaVergne | 2,198 | 0.07% | |
| Independent | Daryl Brooks | 2,066 | 0.06% | |
| Majority | | 658,146 | 19.49 | |
| Turnout | | 3,376,649 | | |

== New Mexico ==
New Mexico election
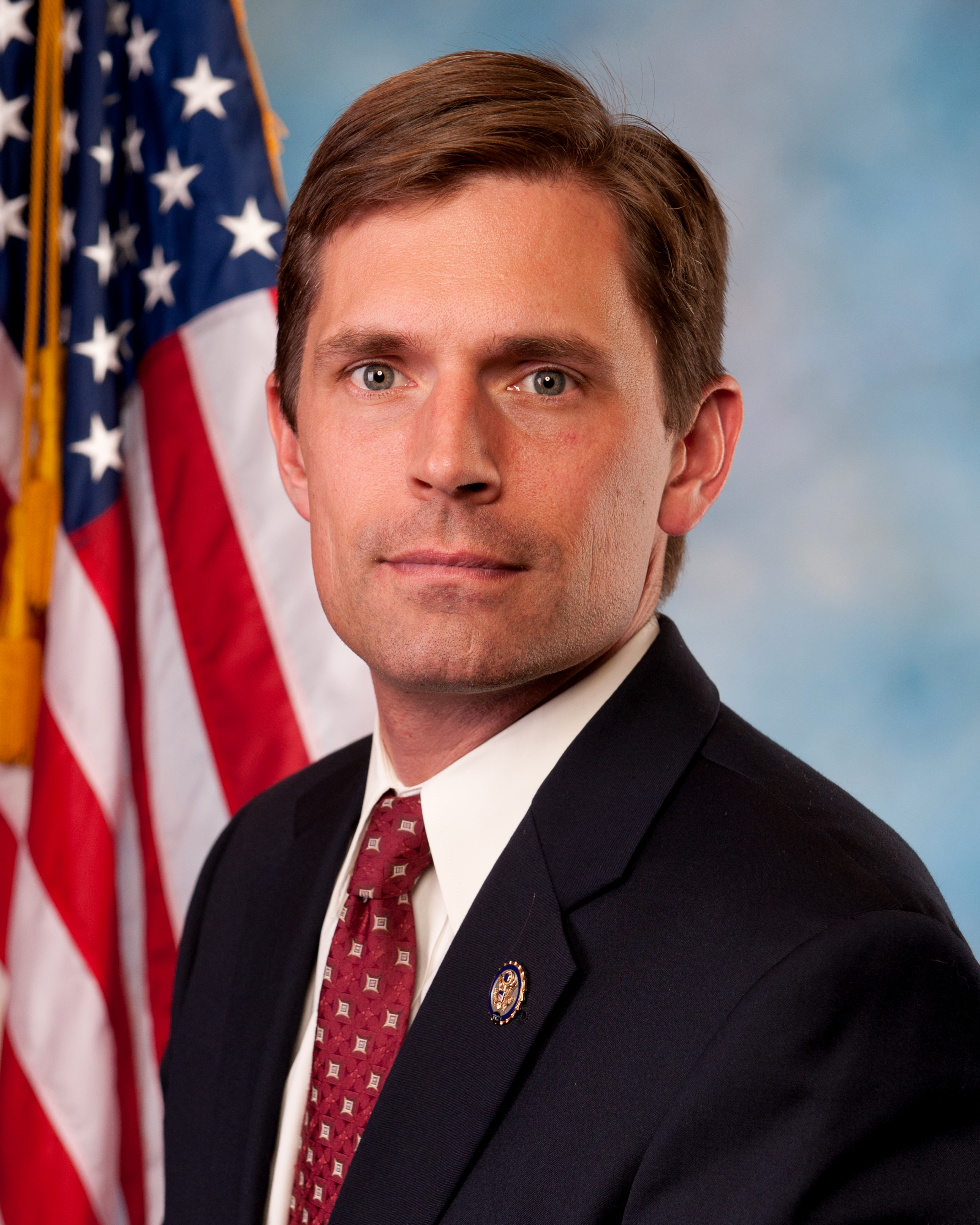

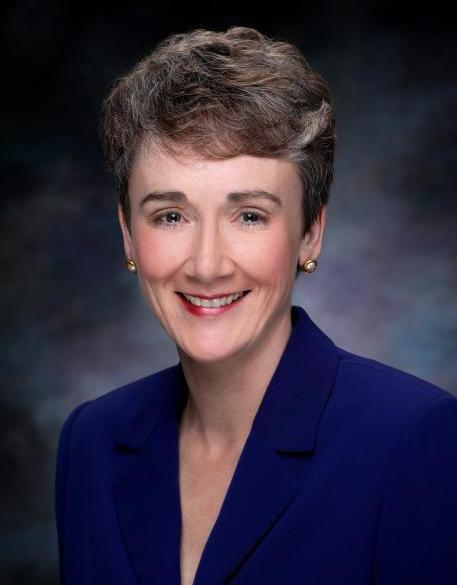
| Nominee | Martin Heinrich | Heather Wilson |
| Party | Democratic | Republican |
| Popular vote | 395,717 | 351,260 |
| Percentage | 51.0% | 45.3% |
- County results Heinrich: 40–50% 50–60% 60–70% 70–80% Wilson: 40–50% 50–60% 60–70% 70–80%
U.S. senator before election
Jeff Bingaman
Democratic
Elected U.S. senator
Martin Heinrich
Democratic

Incumbent Democrat Jeff Bingaman retired instead of running for re-election to a sixth term. Democratic U.S. Representative Martin Heinrich won the open seat. Incumbent Jeff Bingaman won re-election to a fifth term with 70.61% of the vote against Allen McCulloch in the 2006 U.S. senatorial election in New Mexico.

New Mexico Democratic primary
| Party | Candidate | Votes | % |
|---|---|---|---|
| Democratic | Martin Heinrich | 83,432 | 58.9 |
| Democratic | Hector Balderas | 58,128 | 41.1 |
| Total votes | | 141,560 | 100.0 |

New Mexico Republican primary
| Party | Candidate | Votes | % |
|---|---|---|---|
| Republican | Heather Wilson | 63,631 | 70.0 |
| Republican | Greg Sowards | 27,214 | 30.0 |
| Total votes | | 90,845 | 100.0 |

New Mexico general election
| Party | Candidate | Votes | % | ±% |
|---|---|---|---|---|
| Democratic | Martin Heinrich | 395,717 | 51.01 | −19.81% |
| Republican | Heather Wilson | 351,295 | 45.28 | +16.17% |
| American Independent | Jon Barrie | 27,649 | 3.6 | |
| Write-in | Write-in | 617 | 0.08% | |
| Majority | | 44,458 | 6.1 | |
| Turnout | | 775,278 | | |

== New York ==
2012 United States Senate election in New York
- Turnout: 53.2% (voting eligible)
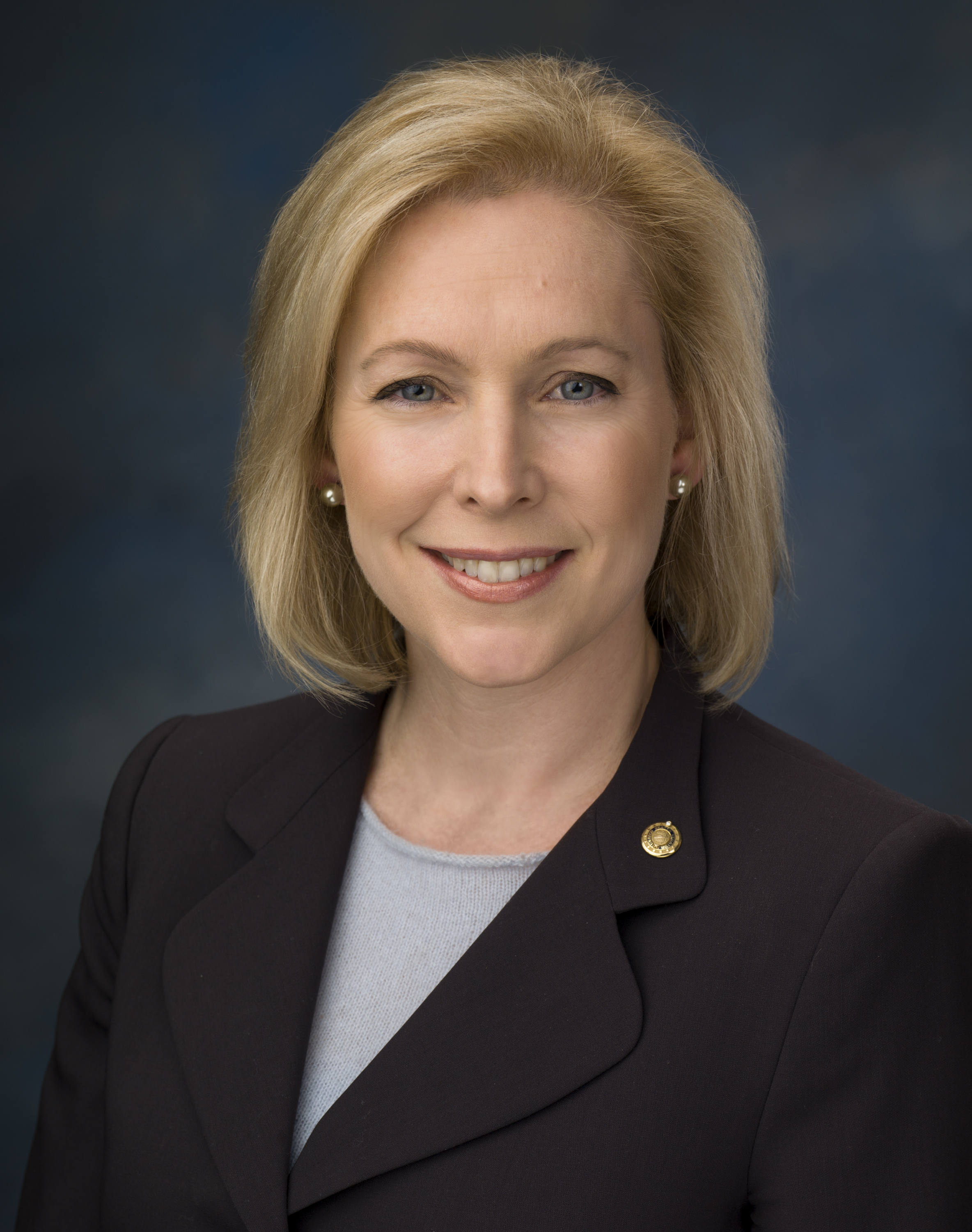

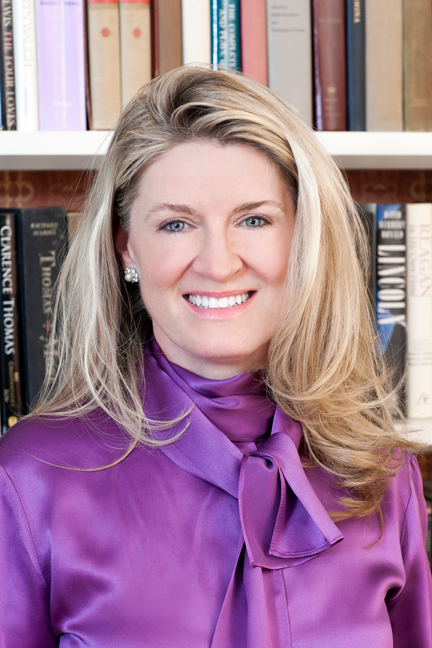
| Nominee | Kirsten Gillibrand | Wendy Long |
| Party | Democratic | Republican |
| Popular vote | 4,822,330 | 1,758,702 |
| Percentage | 72.2% | 26.3% |
- Gillibrand: 50–60% 60–70% 70–80% 80–90% >90% Long: 40–50% 50–60%
U.S. senator before election
Kirsten Gillibrand
Democratic
Elected U.S. senator
Kirsten Gillibrand
Democratic

Incumbent Democrat Kirsten Gillibrand won re-election to her first full term. Gillibrand was opposed in the general election by Wendy Long (who ran on the Republican and Conservative Party tickets) and by three minor party candidates. Gillibrand was re-elected with 72% of the vote, by a margin of 46%, the highest margin for any statewide candidate in New York. Gillibrand performed 9 points better than President Barack Obama did in the presidential race in New York. She carried 60 out of 62 counties statewide. There was one debate, held in October 2012 where Gillibrand and Long debated various issues such as the economy, abortion rights, the debt and deficit, foreign policy, jobs, and tax and regulatory policy.

Governor David Paterson appointed then-U.S. Representative Kirsten Gillibrand to serve as U.S. senator from New York until the 2010 special election, succeeding former U.S. senator Hillary Clinton, who resigned to serve as U.S. Secretary of State in the Obama administration. Gillibrand won the special election in 2010 with 62.95% of the vote over former U.S. Representative Joseph DioGuardi.

According to preliminary results, Gillibrand won re-election by a landslide of over 70% of the vote on November 6, 2012.

New York general election
| Party | Candidate | Votes | % | ±% |
|---|---|---|---|---|
| Democratic | Kirsten Elizabeth Gillibrand (incumbent) | 4,822,330 | 72.22 | +9.22% |
| Republican | Wendy Elizabeth Long | 1,758,702 | 26.34 | |
| Green | Colia Clark | 36,547 | 0.60 | |
| Libertarian | Chris Edes | 28,315 | 0.50 | |
| Independent | John Mangelli | 20,223 | 0.30 | |
| Write-in | Write-in | 2,001 | 0.02 | |
| Majority | | 3,053,412 | | |
| Turnout | | 6,677,666 | 100.00 | |

== North Dakota ==
2012 United States Senate election in North Dakota
- Turnout: 60.6% (voting eligible)
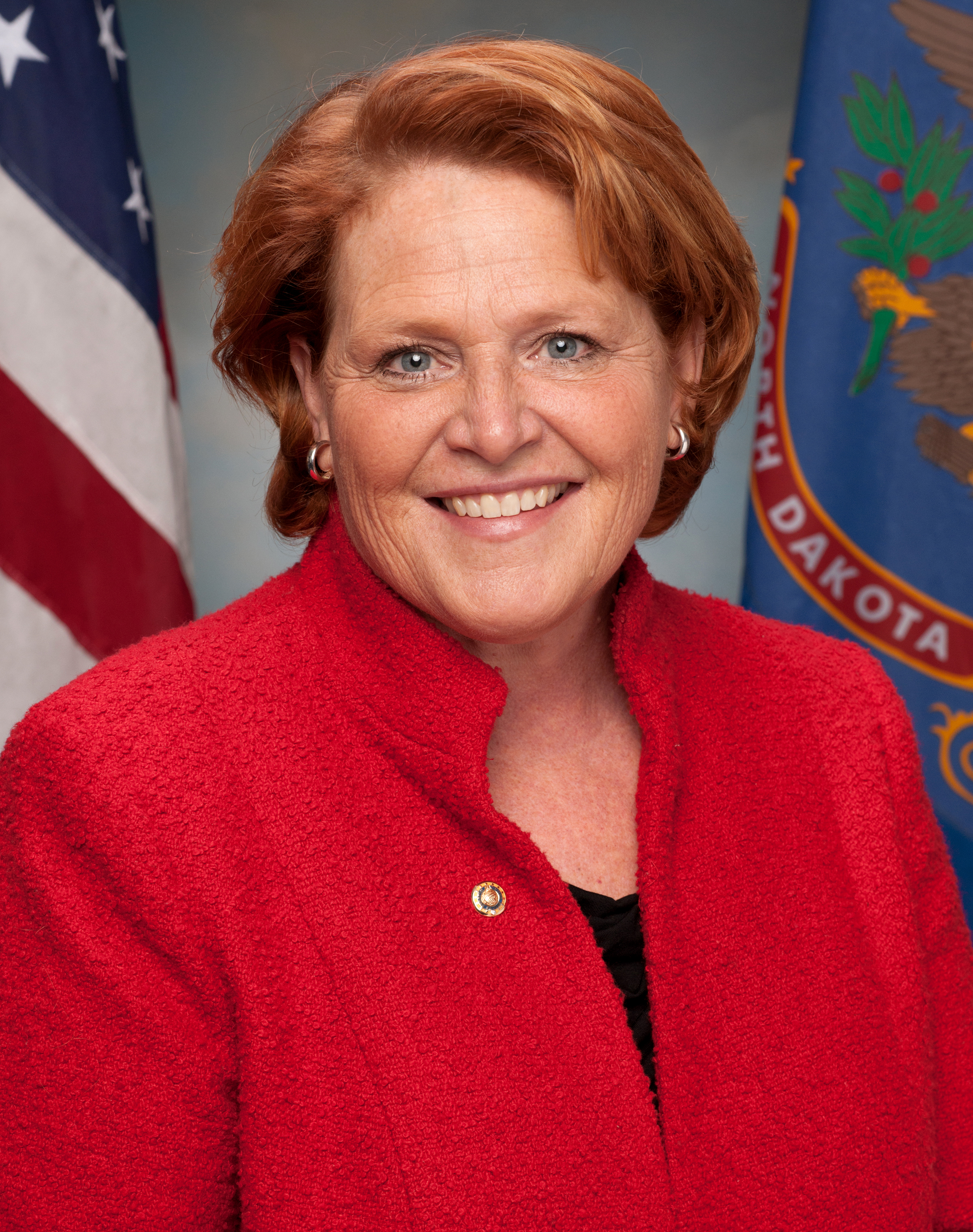

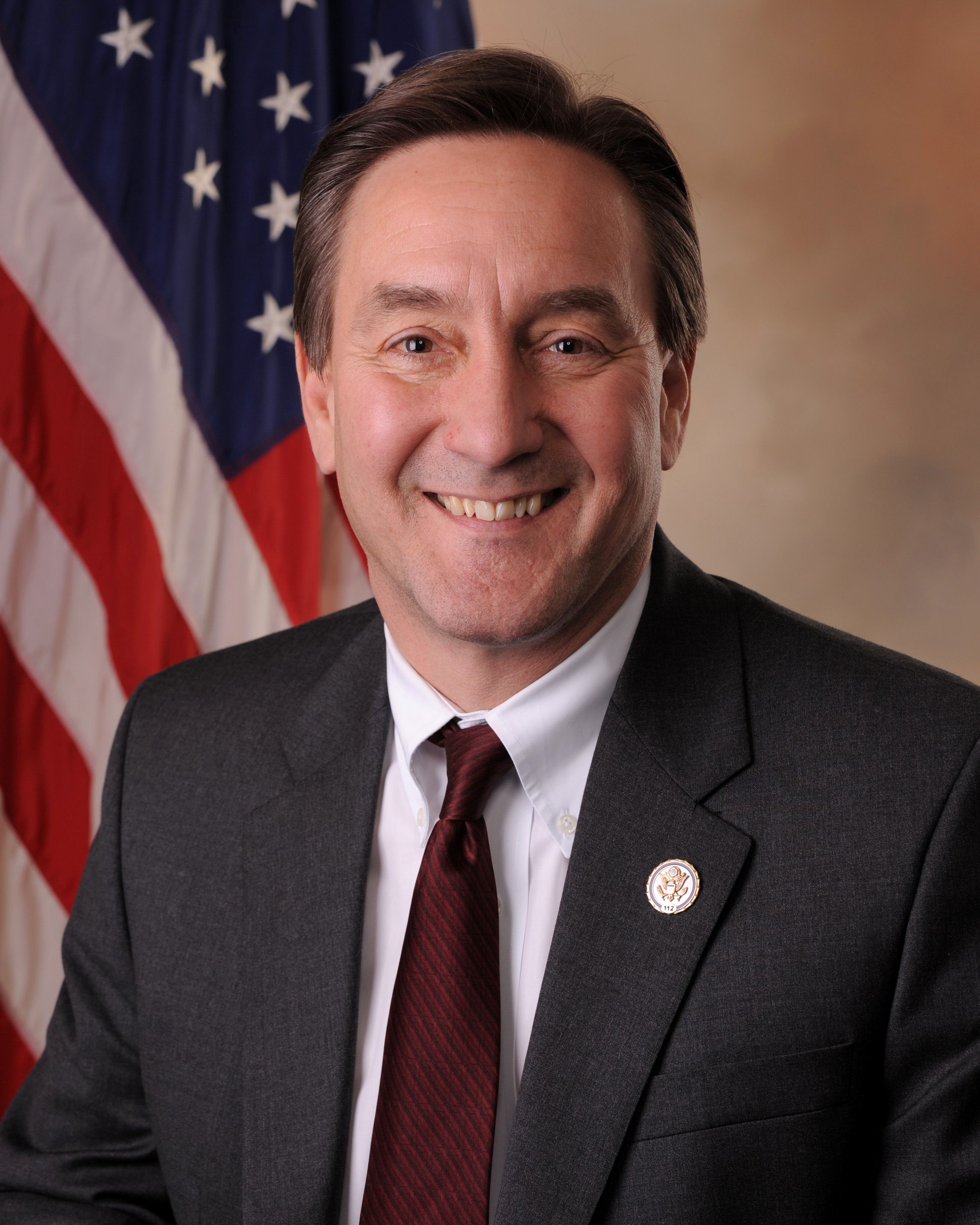
| Nominee | Heidi Heitkamp | Rick Berg |
| Party | Democratic–NPL | Republican |
| Popular vote | 161,337 | 158,401 |
| Percentage | 50.2% | 49.3% |
- Heitkamp: 50–60% 60–70% 80–90% Berg: 50–60% 60–70% 70–80%
U.S. senator before election
Kent Conrad
Democratic–NPL
Elected U.S. senator
Heidi Heitkamp
Democratic–NPL

Incumbent Democrat Kent Conrad retired instead of running for re-election to a fifth term. Though each party endorses a single candidate in state political conventions in the spring, North Dakota determines actual ballot access for the general election in a statewide primary election that was held June 12, 2012. Former Democratic-NPL Attorney General Heidi Heitkamp ran for and won the open seat in a close-fought victory.

North Dakota Republican primary
| Party | Candidate | Votes | % |
|---|---|---|---|
| Republican | Rick Berg | 67,849 | 66.41 |
| Republican | Duane Sand | 34,209 | 33.48 |
| Republican | Write-ins | 111 | 0.41 |
| Total votes | | 102,281 | 100.00 |

North Dakota general election
| Party | Candidate | Votes | % | ±% |
|---|---|---|---|---|
| Democratic–NPL | Heidi Heitkamp | 161,337 | 50.24 | −18.26% |
| Republican | Rick Berg | 158,401 | 49.32 | +20.04% |
| | Write-ins | 1,406 | 0.44 | |
| Majority | | 2,936 | 0.92 | − |
| Turnout | | 322,509 | | |
| Democratic–NPL hold | | Swing | | |

== Ohio ==
Ohio election
- Turnout: 64.6% (voting eligible)
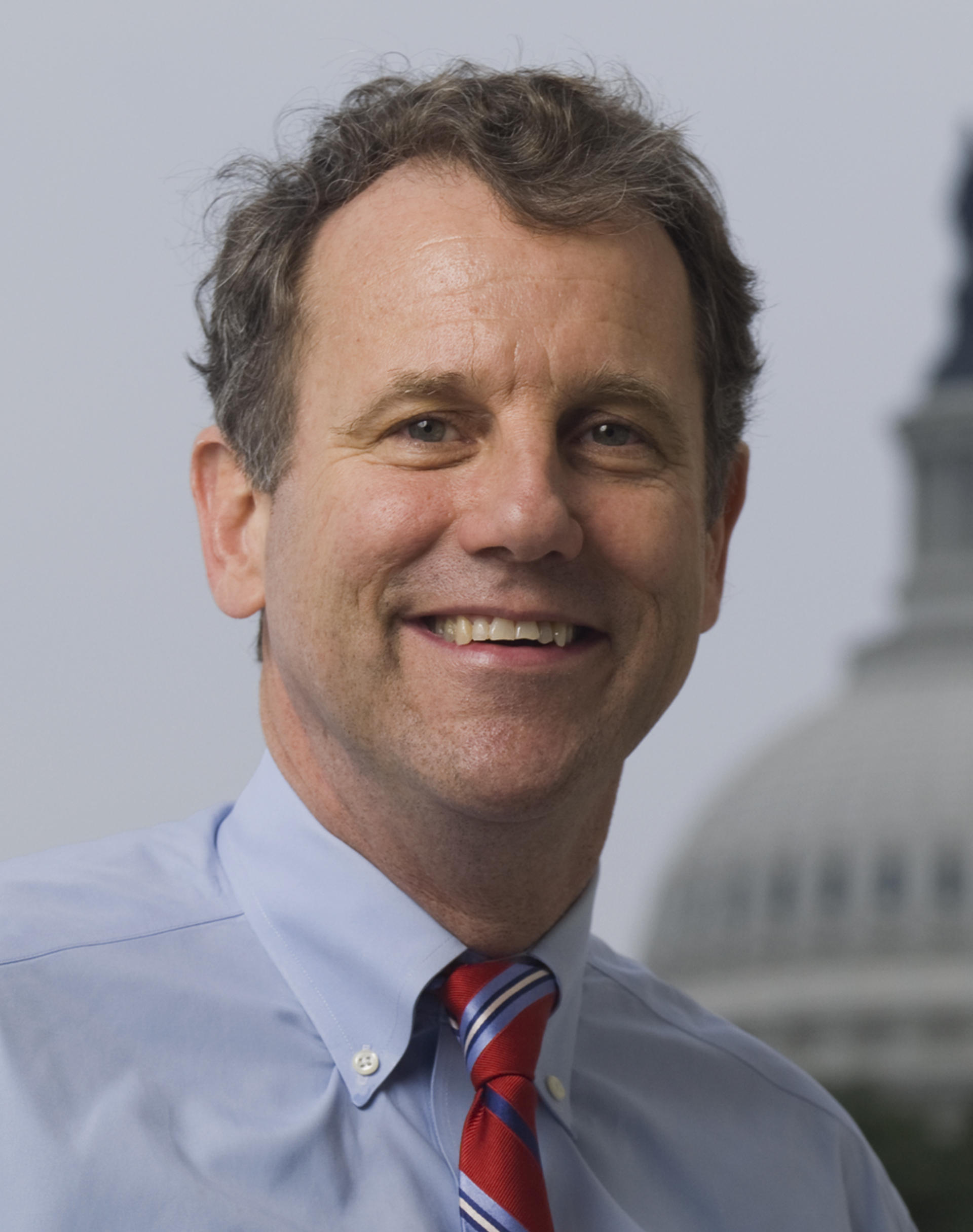

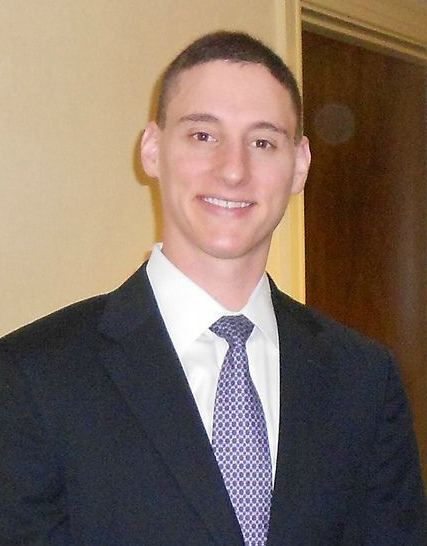
| Nominee | Sherrod Brown | Josh Mandel |
| Party | Democratic | Republican |
| Popular vote | 2,762,757 | 2,435,740 |
| Percentage | 50.7% | 44.7% |
- Brown: 40–50% 50–60% 60–70% Mandel: 40–50% 50–60% 60–70% 70–80%
U.S. senator before election
Sherrod Brown
Democratic
Elected U.S. senator
Sherrod Brown
Democratic

Incumbent Democrat Sherrod Brown won re-election to a second term. He was unopposed in the Democratic primary and Ohio State Treasurer Josh Mandel won the Republican primary with 63% of the vote.

Ohio Democratic primary
| Party | Candidate | Votes | % |
|---|---|---|---|
| Democratic | Sherrod Brown (incumbent) | 802,678 | 100.00 |
| Total votes | | 802,678 | 100.00% |

Ohio Republican primary
| Party | Candidate | Votes | % |
|---|---|---|---|
| Republican | Josh Mandel | 580,525 | 63.00 |
| Republican | Michael Pryce | 130,370 | 14.15 |
| Republican | Donna Glisman | 114,183 | 12.39 |
| Republican | David Dodt | 47,278 | 5.13 |
| Republican | Eric Gregory | 47,123 | 5.11 |
| Republican | Russell Bliss | 1,927 | 0.21 |
| Total votes | | 921,406 | 100.00 |

In 2006, U.S. Representative Sherrod Brown had defeated two-term incumbent Republican Mike DeWine 56%-44% 2006 election. Over the past six years, he established a very liberal, progressive, and populist record. The National Journal named Brown the most liberal U.S. senator in the past two years. The Washington Post called him a "modern-day Paul Wellstone." One article said "Brown is way to the left of Ohio in general, but probably the only person who could outwork Brown is Portman." Brown was the only candidate the 60 Plus Association targeted in the 2012 election cycle.

Mandel, 34, was elected state treasurer in 2010. Before that, he was a Lyndhurst City Councilman and Ohio State Representative. He was criticized as Ohio Treasurer for not fulfilling his pledge to serve a four-year term and for not attending any of the Board of Deposit monthly meetings. However, Mandel raised a lot of money. He was called a rising star in the Republican Party and was called "the rock star of the party." He was also compared to Marco Rubio.

Mandel's campaign was singled out by the independent fact-checking group Politifact for its "casual relationship with the truth" and its tendency to "double down" after inaccuracies were pointed out. The fact-checking group wrote: "For all the gifts Mandel has, from his compelling personal narrative as an Iraq war veteran to a well-oiled fundraising machine, whoppers are fast becoming a calling card of his candidacy."

Mandel raised $7.2 million through the first quarter of 2012. He had $5.3 million cash on hand, trailing Brown's $6.3 million. However, Mandel benefited from massive support from conservative out-of-state superPACs, which raise unlimited amounts of money from anonymous donors. These outside groups, including Crossroads GPS, aired over $60 million in TV advertising supporting Mandel and attacking Brown, outspending Democratically aligned outside groups by more than five-to-one. Mandel's campaign was aided by over $1 million spent primarily on attack ads by a 501(c)(4) organization called the Government Integrity Fund. The group was funded by anonymous donors and run by lobbyist Tom Norris of Columbus, Ohio-based Cap Square Solutions.

Brown did better than polls right before the election suggested. Instead of winning by two points (which polls right before the election had suggested) Brown won by six points. Republicans could not come back from the huge margins for the Democrats of Cuyahoga County, Franklin County, Lucas County, and Hamilton County.

Ohio general election
| Party | Candidate | Votes | % | ±% |
|---|---|---|---|---|
| Democratic | Sherrod Brown (incumbent) | 2,762,757 | 50.7 | −5.90% |
| Republican | Josh Mandel | 2,435,740 | 44.7 | +1.30% |
| Independent | Scott Rupert | 250,617 | 4.6 | +4.58% |
| Majority | | 327,017 | 6.0 | |
| Turnout | | 5,449,414 | | |
| Democratic hold | | Swing | | |

== Pennsylvania ==
2012 United States Senate election in Pennsylvania
- Turnout: 59.4% (voting eligible)
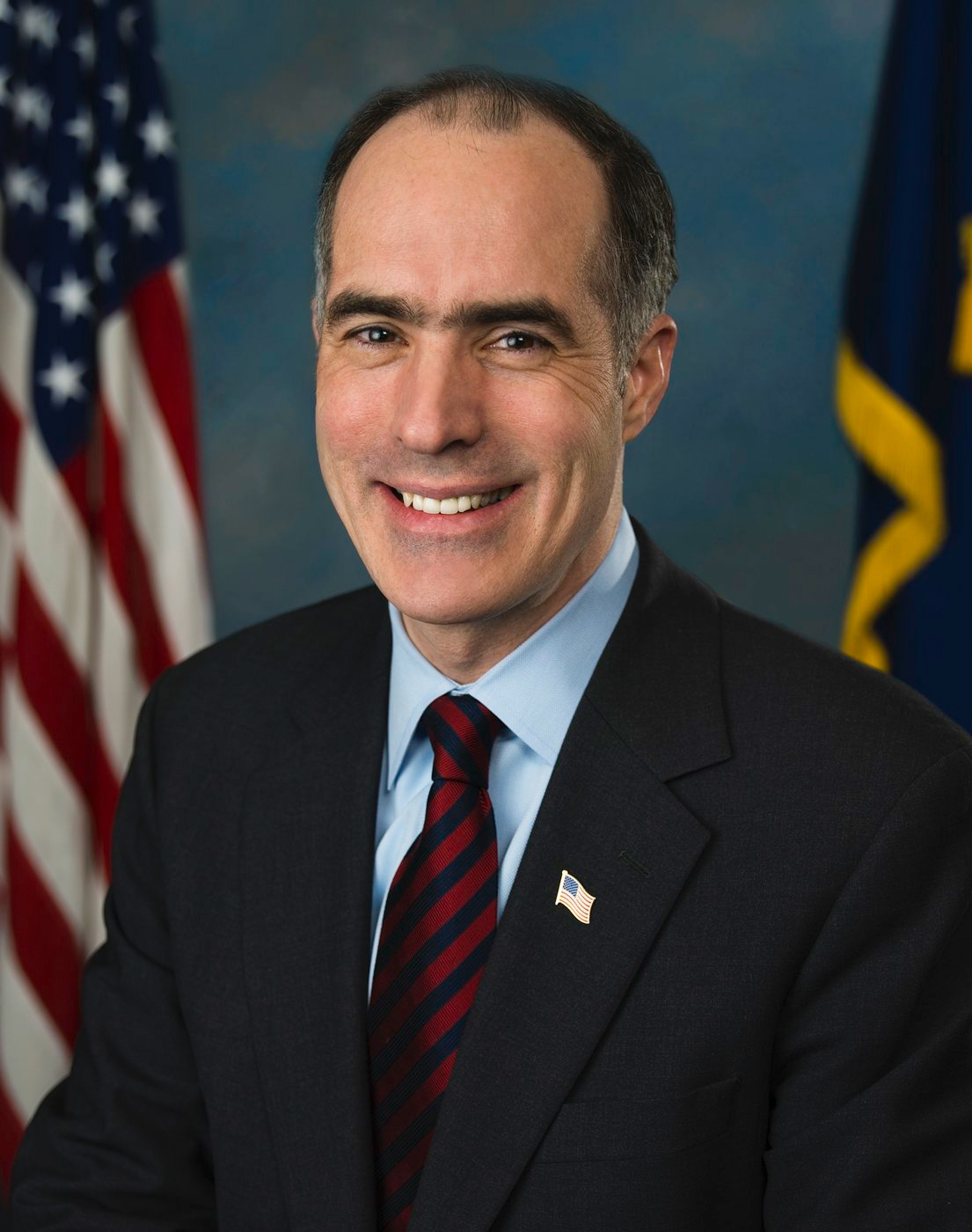

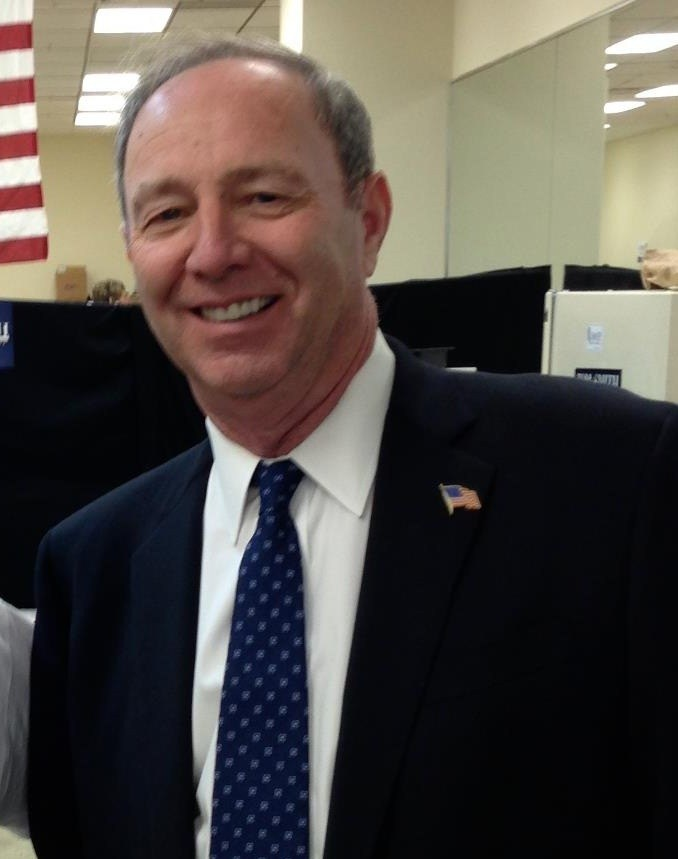
| Nominee | Bob Casey, Jr. | Tom Smith |
| Party | Democratic | Republican |
| Popular vote | 3,021,364 | 2,509,132 |
| Percentage | 53.7% | 44.6% |
- Casey: 40–50% 50–60% 60–70% 80–90% Smith: 40–50% 50–60% 60–70% 70–80%
U.S. senator before election
Bob Casey, Jr.
Democratic
Elected U.S. senator
Bob Casey, Jr.
Democratic

Incumbent Democrat Bob Casey, Jr. won re-election to a second term, defeating Republican nominee Tom Smith, and Libertarian nominee Rayburn Smith.

The primary elections occurred on April 24, 2012, during which the Republicans and Democrats selected nominees for the general election. The Republican primary was a five-way contest. Tom Smith, the eventual nominee, faced David A. Christian, Sam Rohrer, Marc Scaringi, and Steve Welch. The Democratic primary was not heavily contested. Incumbent Bob Casey, Jr., defeated Joseph Vodvarka by a wide margin. The Libertarian Party nominated Rayburn Smith.

Casey led most pre-election polls and eventually defeated his opponents to win re-election to a second term in the U.S. Senate. In so doing, Casey became the first Democratic senator from Pennsylvania elected to a second term in 50 years.

Pennsylvania was considered a battleground state; since the 1970 election of Governor Milton Shapp, partisan control of the governorship had alternated between Democratic and Republican. Additionally, Republicans had controlled the State Senate since 1995, while Democrats assumed control of the State House following the 2006 election, only to lose control in the 2010 election, though the Democrats had won the state in every presidential election from 1992 to 2012.

Pennsylvania Democratic primary
| Party | Candidate | Votes | % |
|---|---|---|---|
| Democratic | Bob Casey, Jr. (incumbent) | 565,488 | 80.9 |
| Democratic | Joseph Vodvarka | 133,683 | 19.1 |
| Total votes | | 699,171 | 100.0 |

Despite many predictions of a close race, the election was not close. Casey, the incumbent, despite being seen as somewhat vulnerable, went into election night with most analysts thinking he would win. Casey would win by more than expected. This can be traced to several factors. Casey trounced Smith in Philadelphia County, home of Philadelphia. Casey also won the surrounding collar counties of Bucks, Chester, Delaware, and Montgomery, which are seen as vital in statewide elections in Pennsylvania. Casey also performed well in Allegheny County, home of Pittsburgh. Casey also performed well in Erie. Casey also performed strongly in the Scranton area. Smith did well in rural counties, but it wasn't enough to overcome the lead Casey had built in the huge population centers. Casey was sworn in for his second term beginning at noon on January 3, 2013.

Pennsylvania general election
| Party | Candidate | Votes | % | ±% |
|---|---|---|---|---|
| Democratic | Bob Casey, Jr. (incumbent) | 3,021,364 | 53.7 | −4.9% |
| Republican | Tom Smith | 2,509,114 | 44.6 | +3.3% |
| Libertarian | Rayburn Smith | 96,926 | 1.7 | +1.7% |
| Majority | | 512,250 | 9.1 | − |
| Turnout | | 5,627,404 | | |
| Democratic hold | | Swing | -4.9% | |

== Rhode Island ==
Rhode Island election
- Turnout: 58.0% (voting eligible)
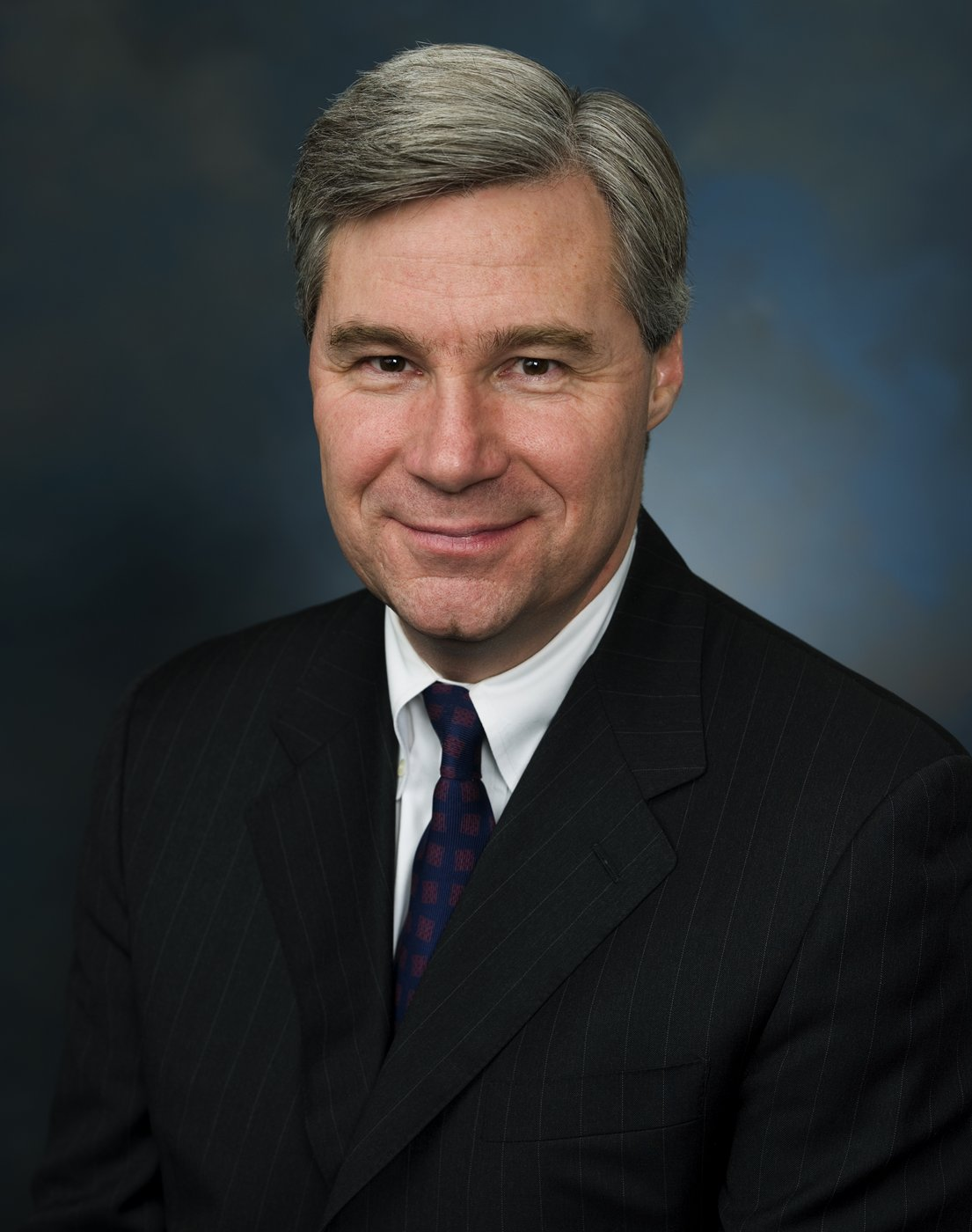

| Nominee | Sheldon Whitehouse | Barry Hinckley |
| Party | Democratic | Republican |
| Popular vote | 271,034 | 146,222 |
| Percentage | 65.0% | 35.0% |
- Whitehouse: 50–60% 60–70% 70–80% 80–90% Hinckley: 50–60%
U.S. senator before election
Sheldon Whitehouse
Democratic
Elected U.S. senator
Sheldon Whitehouse
Democratic

Incumbent Democrat Sheldon Whitehouse was re-elected to a second term in a landslide by a 30% margin of 65% – 35%. Whitehouse won 53.52% of the vote in 2006.

Rhode Island Democratic primary
| Party | Candidate | Votes | % |
|---|---|---|---|
| Democratic | Sheldon Whitehouse | 60,223 | 100.00 |
| Total votes | | 60,223 | 100.00 |

Rhode Island Republican primary
| Party | Candidate | Votes | % |
|---|---|---|---|
| Republican | Barry Hinckley | 6,890 | 100.00 |
| Total votes | | 6,890 | 100.00 |

Rhode Island general election
| Party | Candidate | Votes | % | ±% |
|---|---|---|---|---|
| Democratic | Sheldon Whitehouse | 271,034 | 64.81 | +11.29% |
| Republican | Barry Hinckley | 146,222 | 34.97 | −11.51% |
| Other | Write-ins | 933 | 0.22 | n/a |
| Majority | | 124,812 | 29.85 | +22.81% |
| Total votes | | 418,189 | 100.00 | |
| Turnout | | 418,189 | 58 | |
| Democratic hold | | Swing | | |

== Tennessee ==
Tennessee election
- November 6, 2012
- Turnout: 61.86% ▲11.89 pp
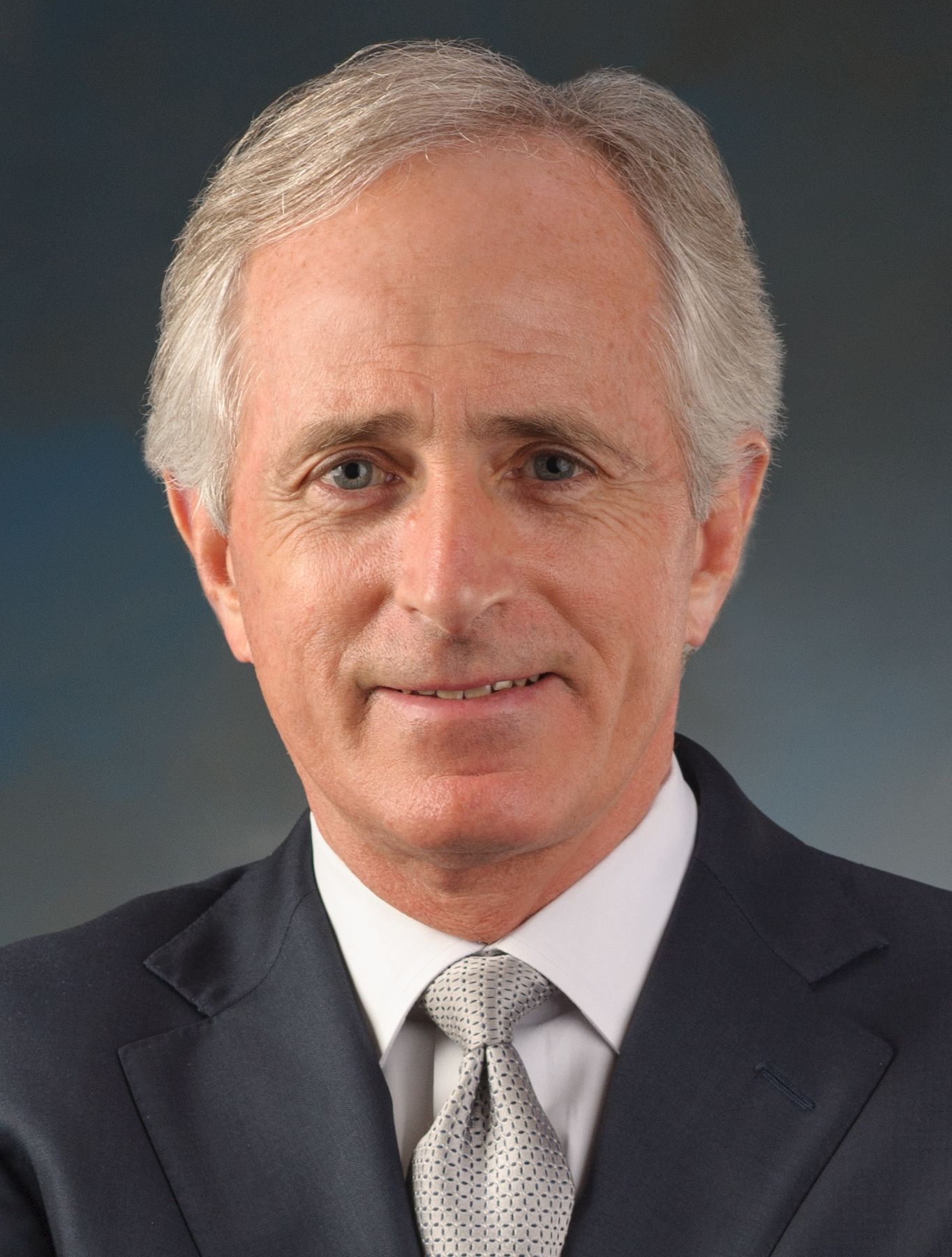
| Nominee | Bob Corker | Mark Clayton |
| Party | Republican | Democratic |
| Popular vote | 1,506,443 | 705,882 |
| Percentage | 64.89% | 30.41% |
- Corker: 40–50% 50–60% 60–70% 70–80% 80–90% Clayton: 50–60% 60–70%
U.S. senator before election
Bob Corker
Republican
Elected U.S. Senator
Bob Corker
Republican

Incumbent Republican Bob Corker won a second term. Corker easily won the Republican primary with 85% of the vote. He faced Democratic Party nominee Mark E. Clayton as well as several third-party candidates and several independents.

Clayton won the Democratic nomination with 30% of the vote, despite raising no money and having a website that was four years out of date. The next day Tennessee's Democratic Party disavowed the candidate over his active role in the Public Advocate of the United States, which they described as a "known hate group". They blamed his victory among candidates for whom the TNDP provided little forums to become known on the fact that his name appeared first on the ballot, and said they would do nothing to help his campaign, urging Democrats to vote for "the write-in candidate of their choice" in November. One of the Democratic candidates, Larry Crim, filed a petition seeking to offer the voters a new primary in which to select a Democratic nominee among the remaining candidates the party had affirmed as bona fide and as a preliminary motion sought a temporary restraining order against certification of the results, but after a judge denied the temporary order Crim withdrew his petition

Tennessee Republican primary
| Party | Candidate | Votes | % |
|---|---|---|---|
| Republican | Bob Corker (incumbent) | 389,483 | 85.25% |
| Republican | Zach Poskevich | 28,299 | 6.19% |
| Republican | Fred Anderson | 15,942 | 3.49% |
| Republican | Mark Twain Clemens | 11,788 | 2.58% |
| Republican | Brenda Lenard | 11,378 | 2.49% |
| Total votes | | 456,890 | 100.00% |

Democratic primary results
| Party | Candidate | Votes | % |
|---|---|---|---|
| Democratic | Mark E. Clayton | 48,126 | 29.99% |
| Democratic | Gary Gene Davis | 24,789 | 15.45% |
| Democratic | Park Overall | 24,263 | 15.12% |
| Democratic | Larry Crim | 17,383 | 10.83% |
| Democratic | Benjamin Roberts | 16,369 | 10.20% |
| Democratic | David Hancock | 16,167 | 10.08 |
| Democratic | Thomas Owens | 13,366 | 8.33 |
| Total votes | | 160,463 | 100.00 |

Tennessee general election
| Party | Candidate | Votes | % | ±% |
|---|---|---|---|---|
| Republican | Bob Corker (incumbent) | 1,506,443 | 64.89% | +14.18% |
| Democratic | Mark Clayton | 705,882 | 30.41% | −17.59% |
| Green | Martin Pleasant | 38,472 | 1.66% | +1.52% |
| Independent | Shaun Crowell | 20,936 | 0.90% | N/A |
| Constitution | Kermit Steck | 18,620 | 0.80% | N/A |
| Independent | James Higdon | 8,085 | 0.35% | N/A |
| Independent | Michael Joseph Long | 8,080 | 0.35% | N/A |
| Independent | Troy Stephen Scoggin | 7,148 | 0.31% | N/A |
| Independent | David Gatchell | 6,523 | 0.28% | N/A |
| n/a | Write-ins | 1,288 | 0.05% | N/A |
| Total votes | | 2,321,477 | 100.00% | N/A |
| Republican hold | | | | |

== Texas ==
Texas election
- Turnout: 49.7% (voting eligible)
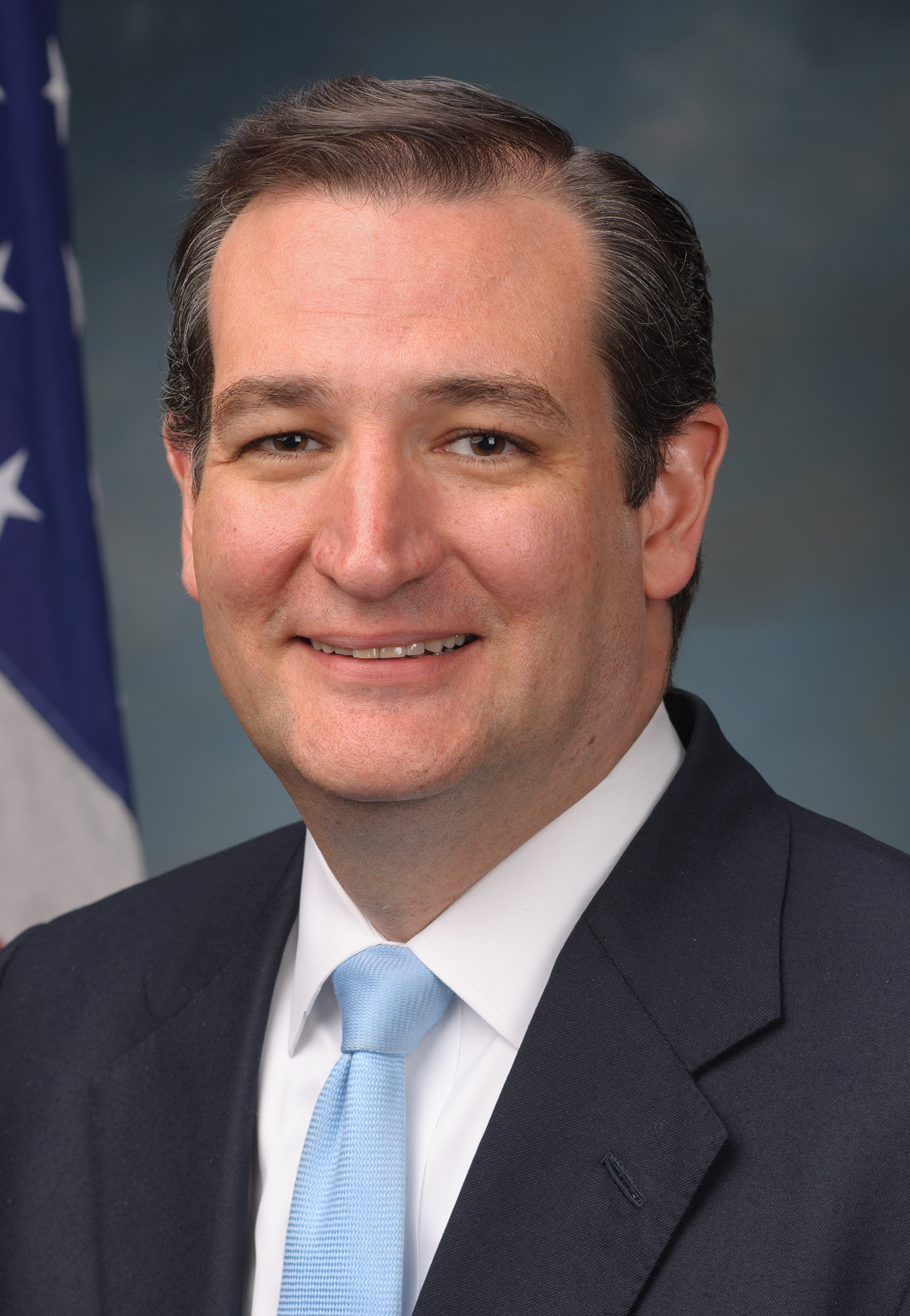

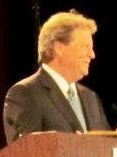
| Nominee | Ted Cruz | Paul Sadler |
| Party | Republican | Democratic |
| Popular vote | 4,440,137 | 3,194,927 |
| Percentage | 56.6% | 40.5% |
- Cruz: 40–50% 50–60% 60–70% 70–80% 80–90% >90% Sadler: 40–50% 50–60% 60–70% 70–80% 80–90%
U.S. senator before election
Kay Bailey Hutchison
Republican
Elected U.S. senator
Ted Cruz
Republican

Incumbent Republican Kay Bailey Hutchison retired instead of running for re-election to a fourth full term. Libertarian John Jay Myers was elected by nomination at the Texas Libertarian Party State Convention on June 8, 2012. After the first round of primary on May 29, 2012, a runoff was held July 31, 2012, for both the Democratic and Republican parties, with Paul Sadler and Ted Cruz winning, respectively. Cruz won the open seat.

Democratic runoff results
| Party | Candidate | Votes | % |
|---|---|---|---|
| Democratic | Paul Sadler | 148,940 | 63.03 |
| Democratic | Grady Yarbrough | 87,365 | 36.97 |
| Total votes | | 236,305 | 100.00 |

Texas Republican primary runoff
| Party | Candidate | Votes | % |
|---|---|---|---|
| Republican | Ted Cruz | 631,812 | 56.82 |
| Republican | David Dewhurst | 480,126 | 43.18 |
| Total votes | | 1,111,938 | 100.00 |

Texas general election
| Party | Candidate | Votes | % | ±% |
|---|---|---|---|---|
| Republican | Ted Cruz | 4,440,137 | 56.46 | −5.23% |
| Democratic | Paul Lindsey Sadler | 3,194,927 | 40.62 | +4.58% |
| Libertarian | John Jay Myers | 162,354 | 2.06 | −0.20% |
| Green | David Collins | 67,404 | 0.86 | +0.86% |
| Majority | | 1,245,210 | 15.84 | |
| Turnout | | 7,864,822 | | |
| Republican hold | | Swing | | |

== Utah ==
2012 United States Senate election in Utah
- Turnout: 55.4% (voting eligible)
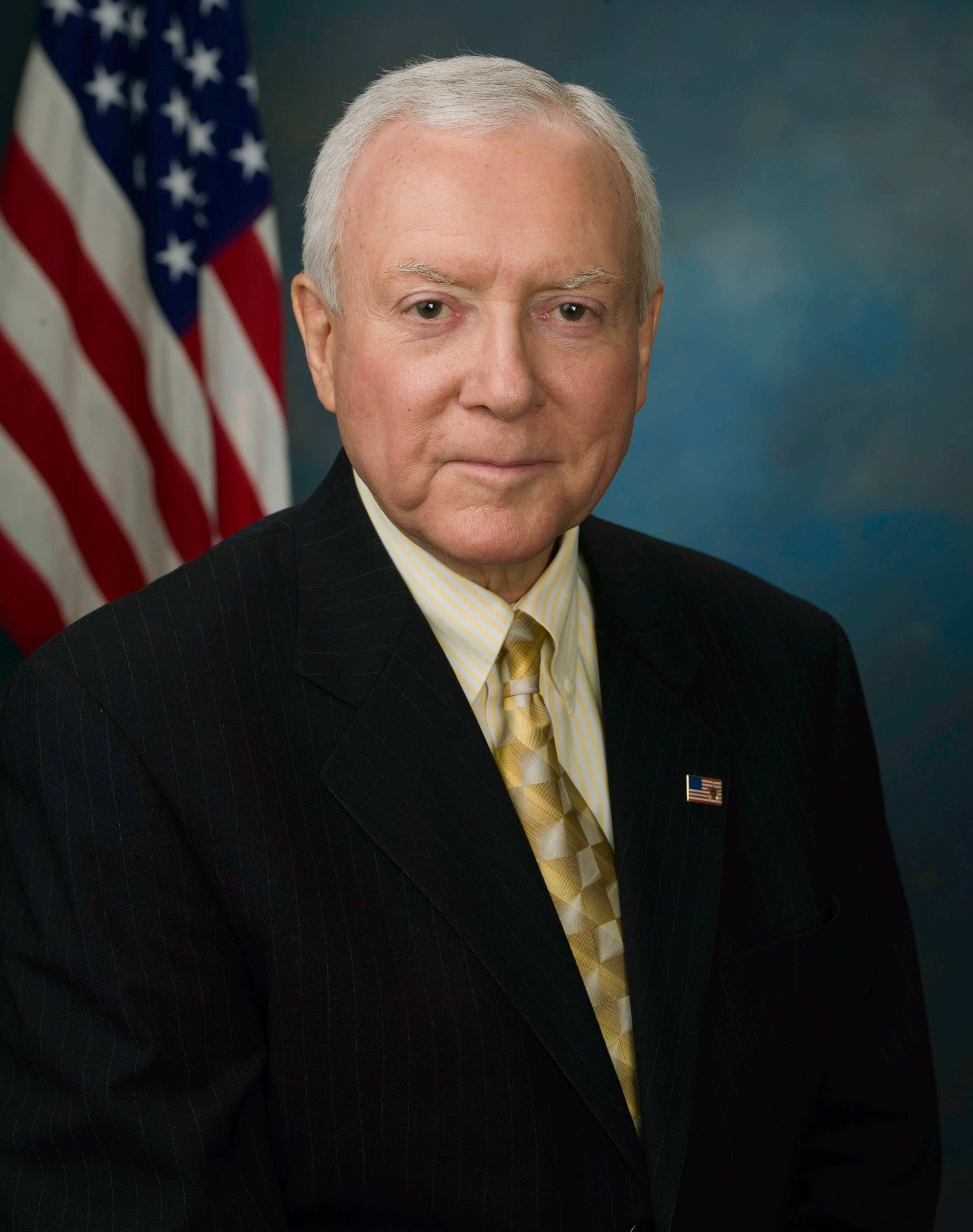

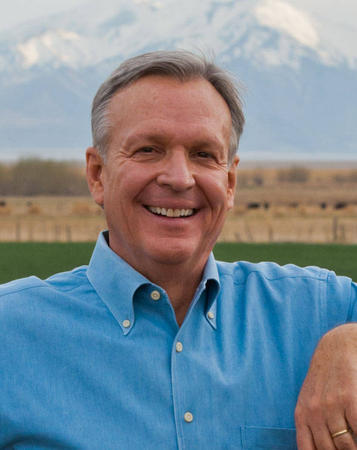
| Nominee | Orrin Hatch | Scott Howell |
| Party | Republican | Democratic |
| Popular vote | 595,972 | 275,880 |
| Percentage | 65.2% | 30.2% |
- County results Hatch: 50–60% 60–70% 70–80% 80–90% Howell: 40–50%
U.S. senator before election
Orrin Hatch
Republican
Elected U.S. senator
Orrin Hatch
Republican

Incumbent Republican Orrin Hatch won re-election to a seventh term against former state senator and IBM executive, Scott Howell the Democratic candidate.

In 2006, incumbent Orrin Hatch won re-election to a sixth term. In 2008, Jason Chaffetz defeated the incumbent Republican U.S. Representative, Chris Cannon, in the 2008 primary for Utah's 3rd congressional district. In 2010, Mike Lee defeated Bob Bennett in the 2010 Utah Senate election. In March 2011, just-elected U.S. senator Mike Lee said he would not endorse Hatch in the primary. In May 2011, Chaffetz told several Utah political insiders that he planned to run, but he would not make an official decision until after Labor Day of 2011.

In June 2011, prominent conservative radio talk show host Mark Levin endorsed Hatch. The fiscally conservative 501(c)4 organization Club for Growth encouraged Chaffetz to run. The group cited Hatch's support for the Troubled Asset Relief Program, State Children's Health Insurance Program, No Child Left Behind Act, Bridge to Nowhere, and other votes among the reasons why they opposed his re-election. In an interview with Politico, Chaffetz stated, "After 34 years of service, I think most Utahans want a change. They want to thank him for his service, but it's time to move on. And for me personally, I think he's been on the wrong side of a host of major issues." The congressman cited Hatch's vote in favor of Equal Opportunity to Serve Act and the Health Equity and Access Reform Today Act of 1993. However, Chaffetz ultimately decided against a run.

Democratic convention results
| Party | Candidate | Votes | % |
|---|---|---|---|
| Democratic | Scott Howell | - | 63.0 |
| Democratic | Pete Ashdown | - | 37.0 |
| Total votes | | - | 100.0 |

Utah Republican primary
| Party | Candidate | Votes | % |
|---|---|---|---|
| Republican | Orrin Hatch (incumbent) | 146,394 | 66.0 |
| Republican | Dan Liljenquist | 73,668 | 34.0 |
| Total votes | | 220,062 | 100.0 |

Utah general election
| Party | Candidate | Votes | % | ±% |
|---|---|---|---|---|
| Republican | Orrin Hatch (incumbent) | 595,972 | 65.21 | +2.85% |
| Democratic | Scott Howell | 275,880 | 30.19 | −0.87% |
| Constitution | Shaun McCausland | 28,367 | 3.10 | −0.67% |
| Justice | Daniel Geery | 7,444 | 0.81 | |
| Independent | Bill Barron | 6,261 | 0.69 | |
| Majority | | 320,092 | 35.02 | |
| Turnout | | 913,924 | 60.40 | |
| Republican hold | | Swing | | |

Note: The ±% column reflects the change in total number of votes won by each party from the previous election. Neither the vote shares nor the turnout figure account for write-ins. Turnout percentage is the portion of registered voters who voted (1,513,241 as of June 11, 2012)

== Vermont ==
Vermont election
- Turnout: 63.47% (voting eligible)
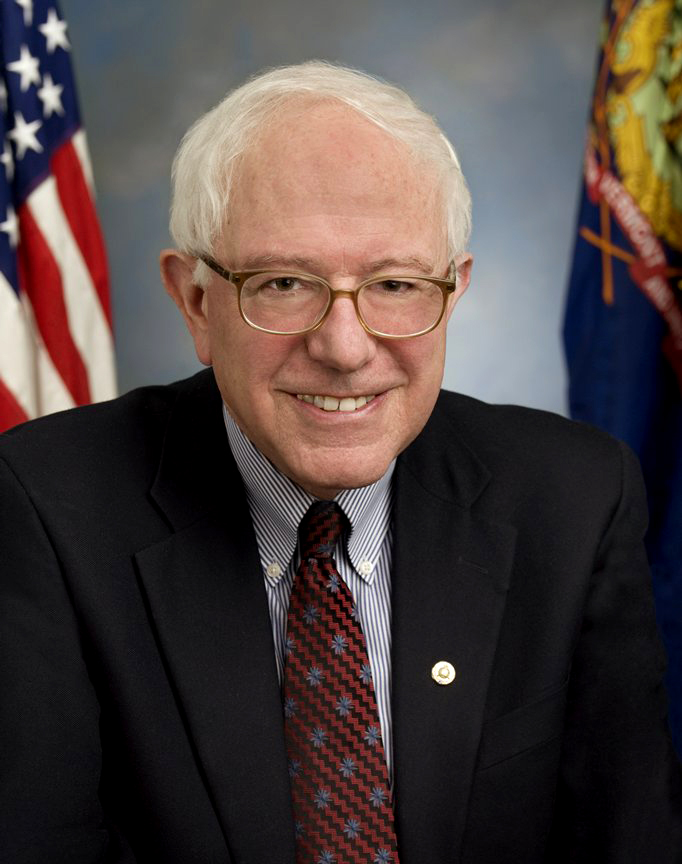

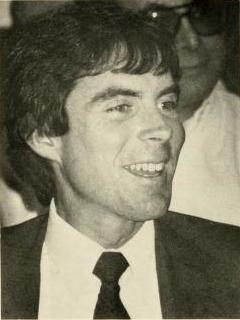
| Nominee | Bernie Sanders | John MacGovern |
| Party | Independent | Republican |
| Popular vote | 207,848 | 72,898 |
| Percentage | 71.0% | 24.9% |
- Sanders: 50–60% 60–70% 70–80% 80–90%
U.S. senator before election
Bernie Sanders
Independent
Elected U.S. senator
Bernie Sanders
Independent

Incumbent Independent Bernie Sanders won re-election to a second term in a landslide, capturing nearly three-quarters of the vote. Sanders also received the nomination of the Vermont Progressive Party, but declined both the Democratic and Progressive nominations after the primary.

Vermont Republican primary
| Party | Candidate | Votes | % |
|---|---|---|---|
| Republican | John MacGovern | 6,343 | 75.4 |
| Republican | H. Brooke Paige | 2,073 | 24.6 |
| Total votes | | 8,416 | 100.0 |

Vermont general election
| Party | Candidate | Votes | % | ±% |
|---|---|---|---|---|
| Independent | Bernie Sanders (incumbent)^{(a)} | 207,848 | 71.00 | +5.59% |
| Republican | John MacGovern | 72,898 | 24.90 | −7.46% |
| Marijuana | Cris Ericson | 5,924 | 2.02 | +1.36% |
| Liberty Union | Pete Diamondstone | 2,511 | 0.86 | +0.55% |
| Peace and Prosperity | Peter Moss | 2,452 | 0.84 | +0.26% |
| VoteKISS | Laurel LaFramboise | 877 | 0.30 | — |
| No party | Write-ins | 252 | 0.09 | — |
| Margin of victory | | 134,950 | 46.10 | +13.06% |
| Turnout | | 292,762 | 63.47^{(b)} | +2.95% |
| Independent hold | | Swing | | |

Note: The ±% column reflects the change in total number of votes won by each party or independent candidate.

== Virginia ==
Virginia election
- Turnout: 66.4% (voting eligible)
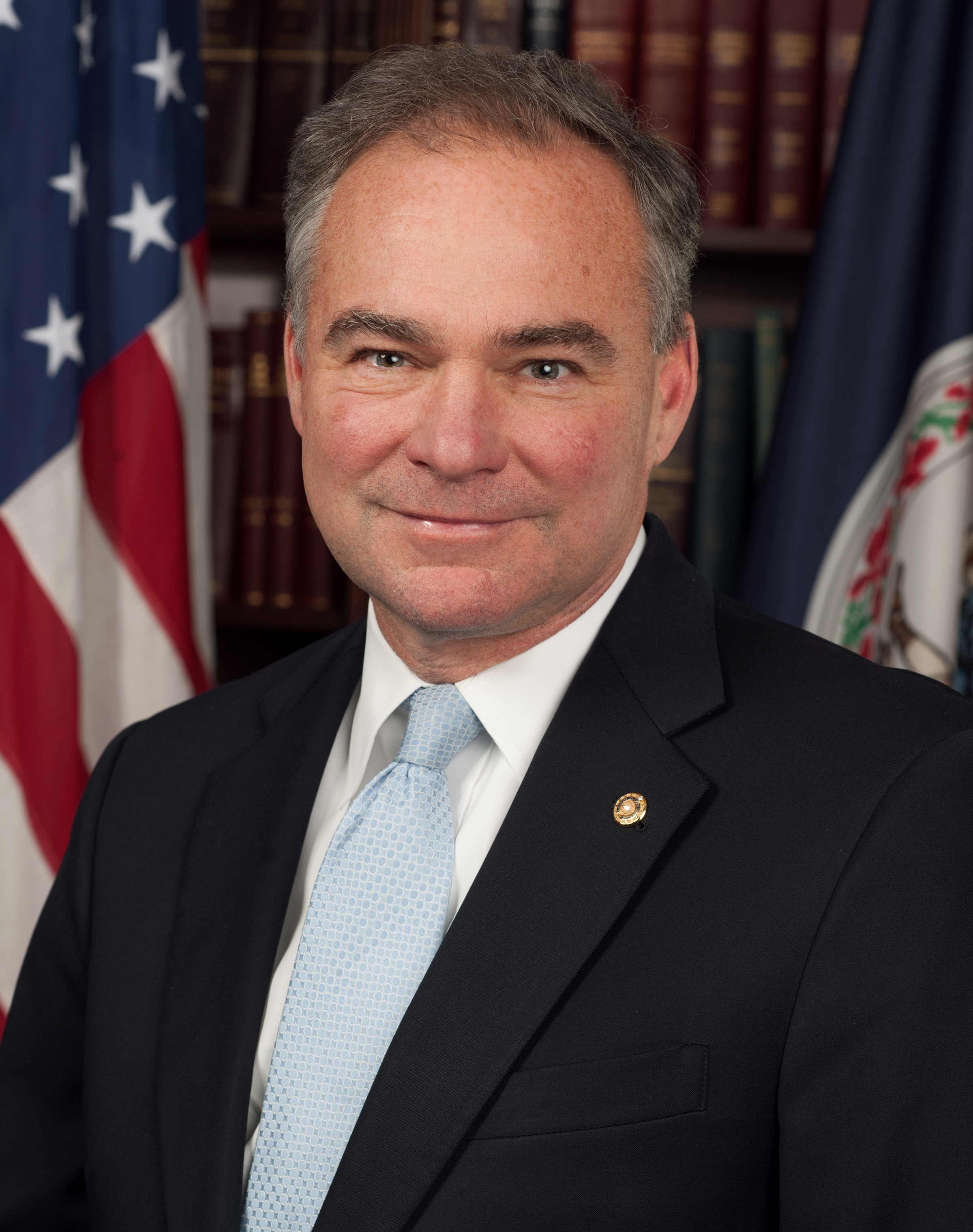

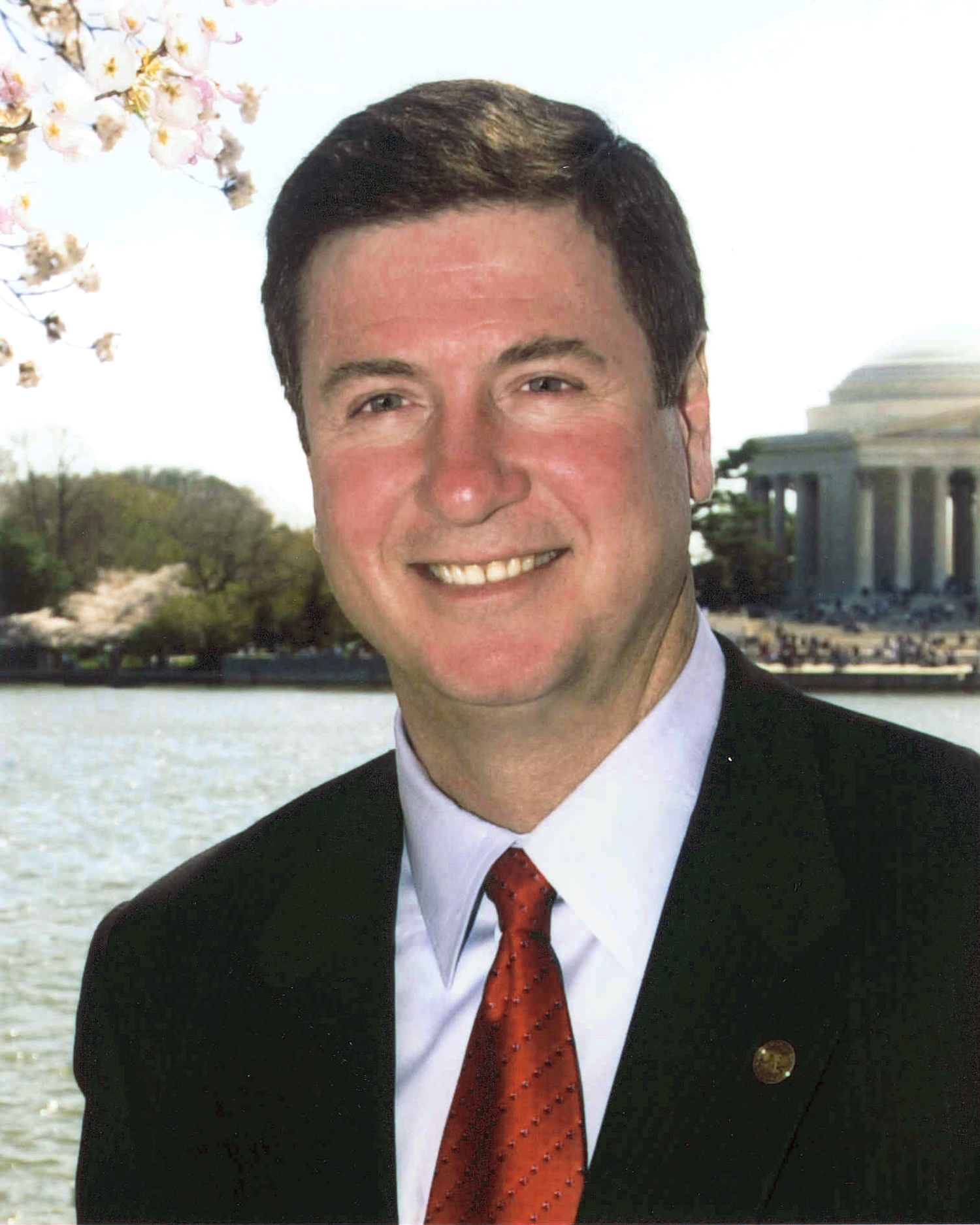
| Nominee | Tim Kaine | George Allen |
| Party | Democratic | Republican |
| Popular vote | 2,010,067 | 1,785,542 |
| Percentage | 52.9% | 47.0% |
- County and independent city results Kaine: 50–60% 60–70% 70–80% 80–90% Allen: 50–60% 60–70% 70–80%
U.S. senator before election
Jim Webb
Democratic
Elected U.S. senator
Tim Kaine
Democratic

Incumbent Democrat Jim Webb retired instead of running for re-election to a second term. Former Governor of Virginia Tim Kaine was unopposed for the Democratic nomination and the Republican party nominated former senator and Governor George Allen through a primary on June 12, 2012. Kaine won the open seat.

Virginia Republican primary
| Party | Candidate | Votes | % |
|---|---|---|---|
| Republican | George Allen | 167,607 | 65.5 |
| Republican | Jamie Radtke | 59,005 | 23.0 |
| Republican | Bob Marshall | 17,302 | 6.8 |
| Republican | E.W. Jackson | 12,083 | 4.7 |
| Total votes | | 255,997 | 100.0 |

Once Democrat Jim Webb retired, many Democratic candidates were speculated. These included U.S. Congressmen Rick Boucher, Gerry Connolly, Glenn Nye, Tom Perriello and Bobby Scott. However, they all declined and encouraged Kaine to run for the seat, believing he would be by far the most electable candidate. Courtney Lynch, former Marine Corps Officer and Fairfax business consultant and Julien Modica, former CEO of the Brain Trauma Recovery & Policy Institute, eventually withdrew from the election, allowing Kaine to be unopposed in the Democratic primary.

Virginia general election
| Party | Candidate | Votes | % | ±% |
|---|---|---|---|---|
| Democratic | Tim Kaine | 2,010,067 | 52.87 | +3.28% |
| Republican | George Allen | 1,785,542 | 46.96 | −2.24% |
| Write-ins | | 6,587 | 0.17 | +0.07% |
| Majority | | 224,525 | 5.91 | +5.52% |
| Turnout | | 3,802,196 | | |
| Democratic hold | | Swing | | |

== Washington ==
Washington election
- Turnout: 64.1% (voting eligible)
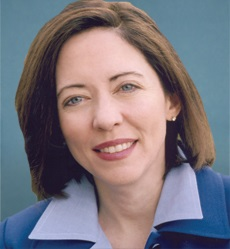

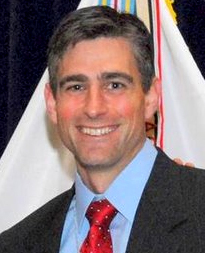
| Nominee | Maria Cantwell | Michael Baumgartner |
| Party | Democratic | Republican |
| Popular vote | 1,855,493 | 1,213,924 |
| Percentage | 60.5% | 39.5% |
- Cantwell: 40–50% 50–60% 60–70% 70–80% Baumgartner: 40–50% 50–60% 60–70%
U.S. senator before election
Maria Cantwell
Democratic
Elected U.S. senator
Maria Cantwell
Democratic

Incumbent Democrat Maria Cantwell won re-election to a third term in a landslide.

Washington blanket primary
| Party | Candidate | Votes | % |
|---|---|---|---|
| Democratic | Maria Cantwell (incumbent) | 626,360 | 55.42 |
| Republican | Michael Baumgartner | 344,729 | 30.50 |
| Republican | Art Coday | 59,255 | 5.24 |
| Democratic | Timothy Wilson | 26,850 | 2.38 |
| Republican | Chuck Jackson | 21,870 | 1.94 |
| Republican | Glenn R. Stockwell | 21,731 | 1.92 |
| Republican | Mike the Mover | 16,459 | 1.46 |
| Reform | Will Baker | 12,865 | 1.14 |
| Total votes | | 1,130,119 | 100.00 |

Washington general election
| Party | Candidate | Votes | % | ±% |
|---|---|---|---|---|
| Democratic | Maria Cantwell (incumbent) | 1,855,493 | 60.45 | +3.60% |
| Republican | Michael Baumgartner | 1,213,924 | 39.55 | −0.38% |
| Majority | | 641,569 | 20.90 | |
| Turnout | | 3,069,417 | 81.25 | |

== West Virginia ==
West Virginia election
- Turnout: 46.3% (voting eligible)
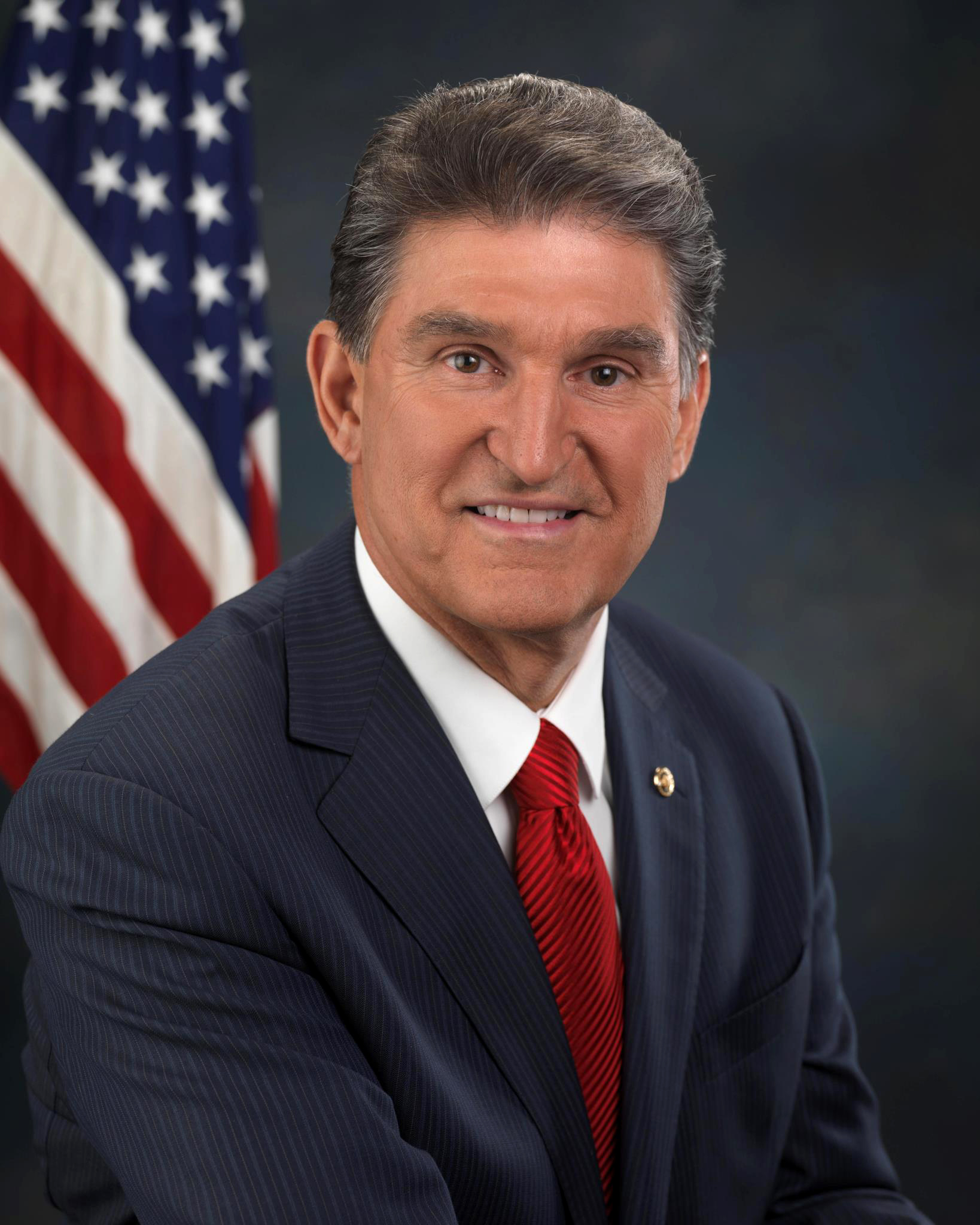

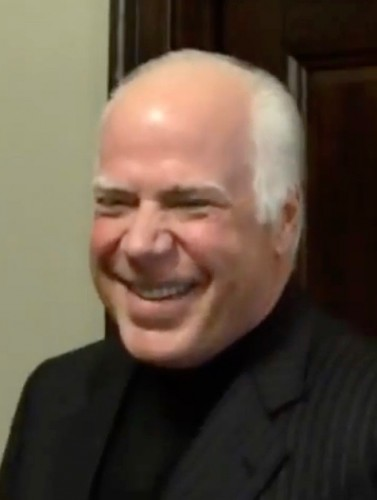
| Nominee | Joe Manchin | John Raese |
| Party | Democratic | Republican |
| Popular vote | 394,532 | 237,825 |
| Percentage | 60.6% | 36.5% |
- Manchin: 40–50% 50–60% 60–70% 70–80% Raese: 50–60% 60–70%
U.S. senator before election
Joe Manchin
Democratic
Elected U.S. senator
Joe Manchin
Democratic

Incumbent Democrat Joe Manchin won re-election to a first full term.

Robert Byrd held this seat in the U.S. Senate since 1959, after having served in the House of Representatives since 1953, making him the longest-serving person in Congress. Byrd led his party in the Senate from 1977 to 1989, as Majority Leader or Minority Leader. Afterward, as the most senior Democrat in the Senate, he served as President pro tempore of the Senate whenever his party was in the majority, including at the time of his death. After Byrd's death, West Virginia Secretary of State Natalie Tennant initially announced that a special election would be held the same day as the regular election for the six-year term. However, that special election was rescheduled to 2010 for it to coincide with the 2010 mid-term elections. Governor Joe Manchin made a temporary appointment of Carte Goodwin to the vacant seat. Goodwin was later replaced by Manchin who won the 2010 special election.

West Virginia Democratic primary
| Party | Candidate | Votes | % |
|---|---|---|---|
| Democratic | Joe Manchin (incumbent) | 163,891 | 79.9 |
| Democratic | Sheirl Fletcher | 41,118 | 20.1 |
| Total votes | | 205,009 | 100 |

Raese filed a rematch against Manchin, arguing that he now had more material to criticize Manchin for. One example is how Manchin lost his long-time endorsement from West Virginians for Life because of his vote against defunding Planned Parenthood, the nation's largest abortion provider. Another example is how he is undecided about whether or not to support Obama's re-election campaign. Senior Obama campaign advisor David Axelrod commented in response, "His concern is about his own political well-being." In addition, he voted against U.S. Congressman Paul Ryan's Republican budget.

Raese wrote an op-ed in the Charleston Gazette saying about Manchin, "Yes, he'll talk like a conservative and act like he's fiscally responsible to appeal to more moderate voters, but under that outward appearance of a lovable rube is the heart of a tax-and-spend liberal."

Raese continued to make controversial statements. In April 2012, he equated smoking bans with Adolf Hitler's yellow badge. He said "in Monongalia County now, I have to put a huge sticker on my buildings to say this is a smoke-free environment. This is brought to you by the government of Monongalia County. Okay? Remember Hitler used to put Star of David on everybody's lapel, remember that? Same thing." That same day, he referred to President Franklin D. Roosevelt as "Fidel Roosevelt." Raese didn't apologize for his statements on Hitler saying "I am not going to be intimidated by a bunch of bullshit. I'm not apologizing to anybody or any organization. It's my perfect right to make a speech about meaningful subject matters in this country." He also called rocker Ted Nugent a "patriot" for criticizing President Barack Obama.

West Virginia general election
| Party | Candidate | Votes | % | ±% |
|---|---|---|---|---|
| Democratic | Joe Manchin | 394,532 | 60.55 | +7.08% |
| Republican | John Raese | 237,825 | 36.50 | −6.90% |
| Mountain | Bob Henry Baber | 19,231 | 2.95 | +1.03% |
| Margin of victory | | 156,707 | 24.05 | +13.98% |
| Turnout | | 651,588 | 52.79 | +9.21% |
| Democratic hold | | Swing | | |

Note: The ±% column reflects the change in total number of votes won by each party from the previous (special) election. Neither the vote shares nor the turnout figure account for write-ins. Turnout percentage is the portion of registered voters (1,234,367 as of January 10, 2012) who voted.

== Wisconsin ==
Wisconsin election
- Turnout: 72.5% (voting eligible)
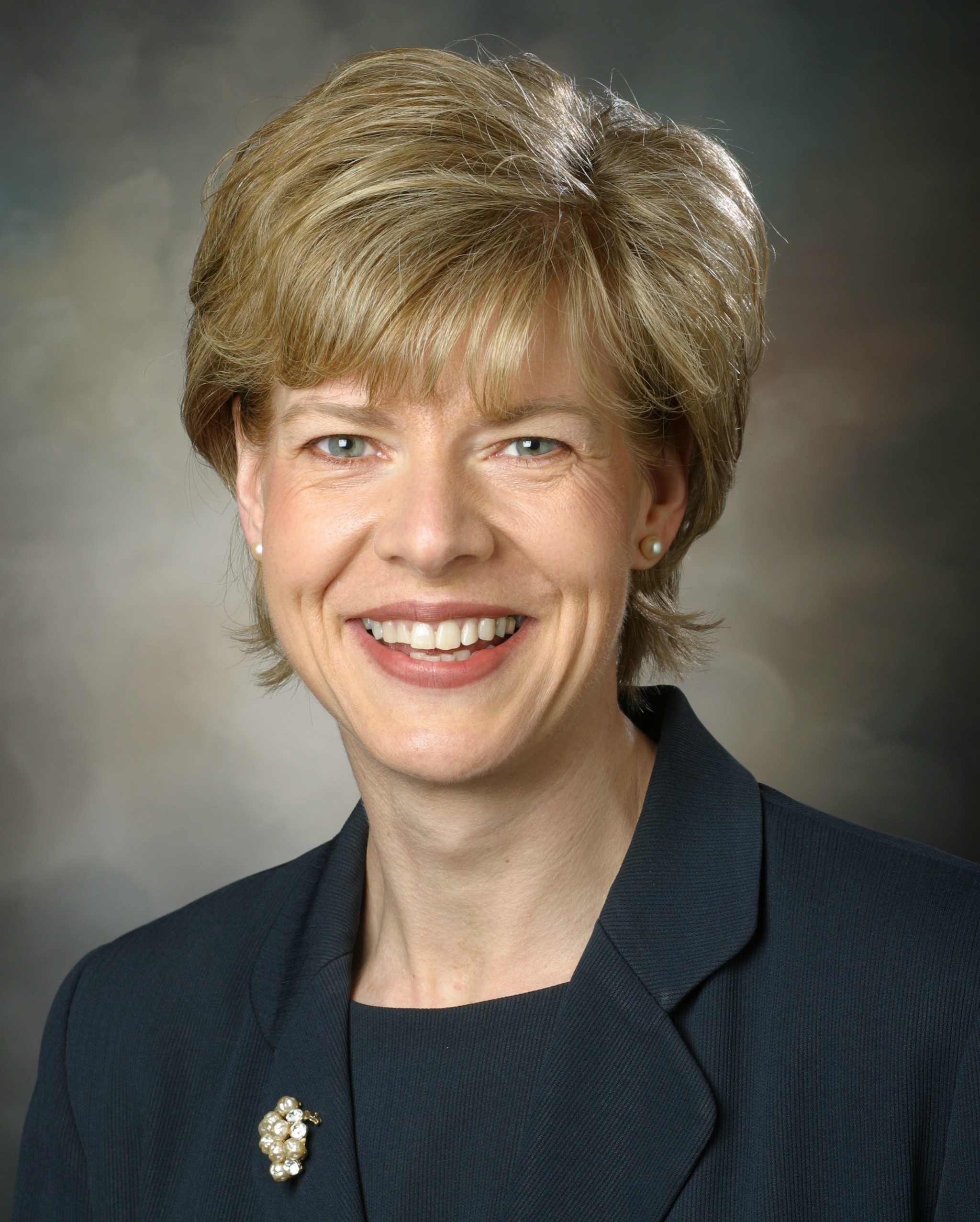

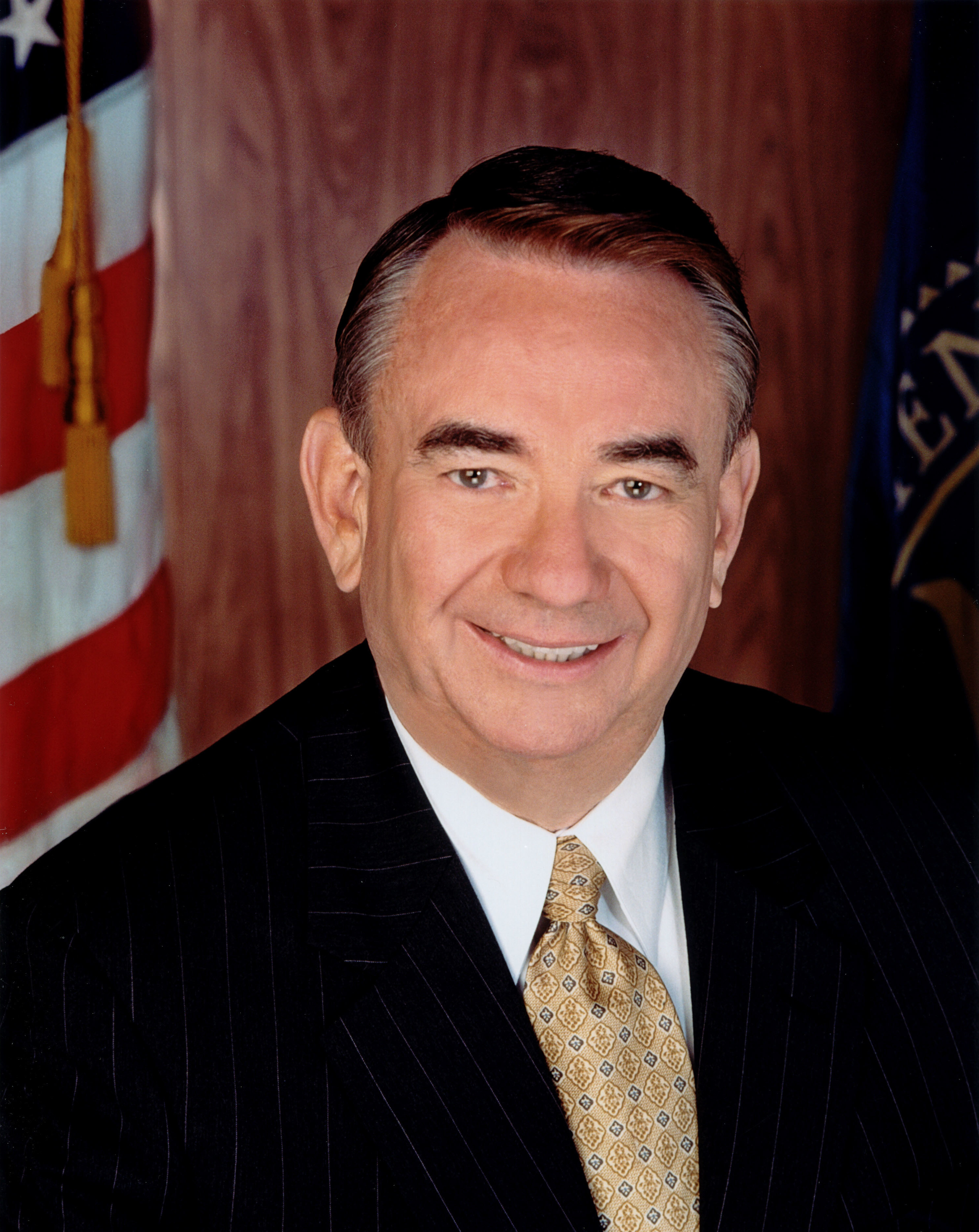
| Nominee | Tammy Baldwin | Tommy Thompson |
| Party | Democratic | Republican |
| Popular vote | 1,547,104 | 1,380,126 |
| Percentage | 51.4% | 45.9% |
- Baldwin: 40–50% 50–60% 60–70% 70–80% Thompson: 40–50% 50–60% 60–70%
U.S. senator before election
Herb Kohl
Democratic
Elected U.S. senator
Tammy Baldwin
Democratic

Incumbent Democrat Herb Kohl retired instead of running for re-election to a fifth term. Democratic Congresswoman Tammy Baldwin of Wisconsin's 2nd congressional district ran unopposed for her party's nomination. The Republican nominee was former Governor of Wisconsin and former Secretary of Health and Human Services Tommy Thompson, who won with a plurality in a four-way race. In the general election, Baldwin defeated Thompson and won the open seat. She became the first woman elected to represent Wisconsin in the Senate and the first openly gay U.S. senator in history. This is also the first time Thompson lost a statewide race.

Democratic primary results
| Party | Candidate | Votes | % |
|---|---|---|---|
| Democratic | Tammy Baldwin | 185,265 | 99.77 |
| Democratic | Write ins | 424 | 0.23 |
| Total votes | | 185,689 | 100 |

Wisconsin Republican primary
| Party | Candidate | Votes | % |
|---|---|---|---|
| Republican | Tommy Thompson | 197,928 | 34.0 |
| Republican | Eric Hovde | 179,557 | 30.8 |
| Republican | Mark Neumann | 132,786 | 22.8 |
| Republican | Jeff Fitzgerald | 71,871 | 12.3 |
| Republican | Write ins | 244 | 0.04 |
| Total votes | | 582,630 | 100 |

Wisconsin general election
| Party | Candidate | Votes | % | ±% |
|---|---|---|---|---|
| Democratic | Tammy Baldwin | 1,547,104 | 51.41 | −15.9 |
| Republican | Tommy Thompson | 1,380,126 | 45.86 | +16.4 |
| Libertarian | Joseph Kexel | 62,240 | 2.07 | +2.1 |
| Independent | Nimrod Allen, III | 16,455 | 0.55 | n/a |
| Other | Scattered | 3,486 | 0.12 | +0.1 |
| Majority | | 166,978 | 5.55 | |
| Turnout | | 3,009,411 | 72.5 | |
| Democratic hold | | Swing | | |

== Wyoming ==
Wyoming election
- Turnout: 58.9% (voting eligible)
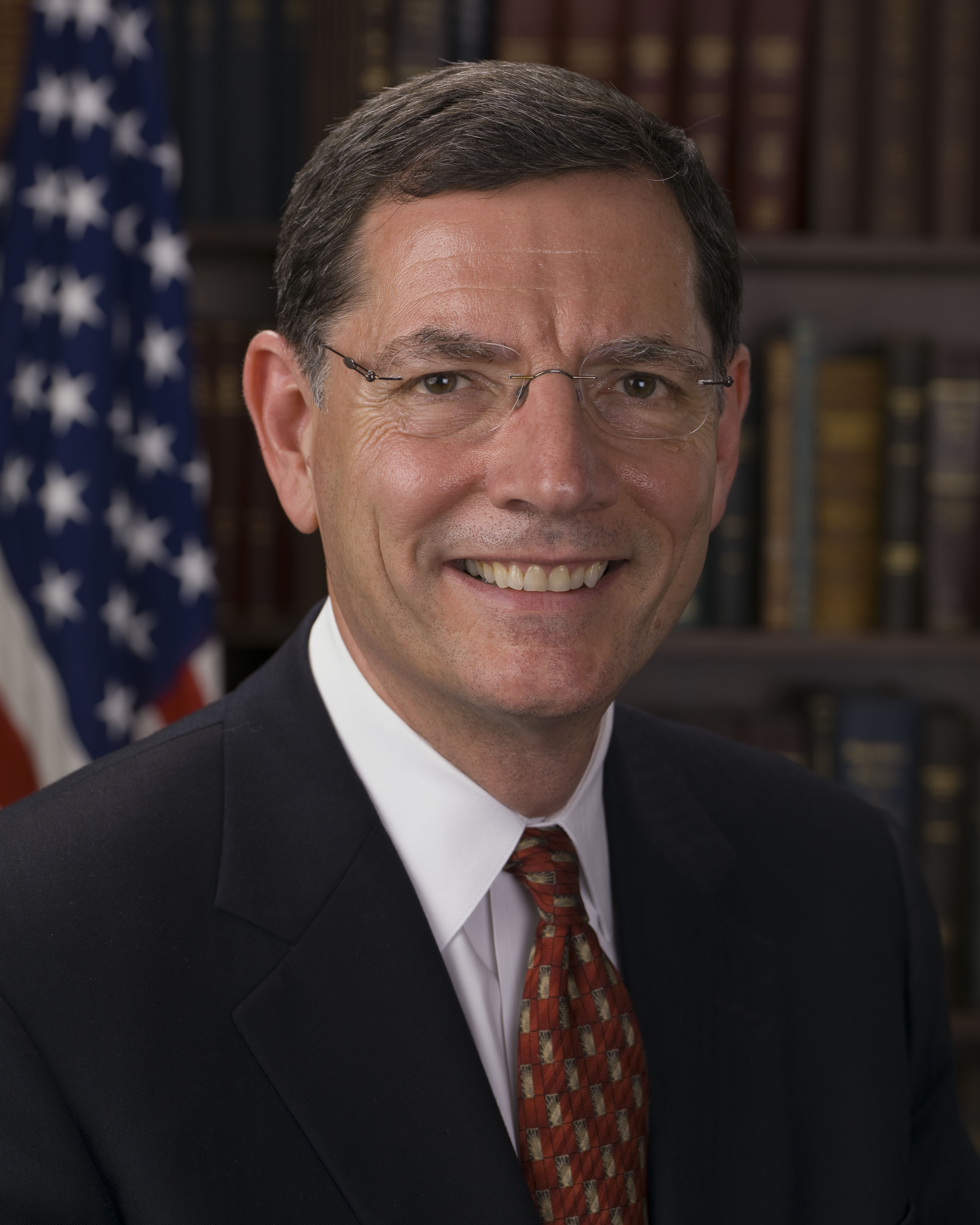

| Nominee | John Barrasso | Tim Chesnut |
| Party | Republican | Democratic |
| Popular vote | 184,531 | 52,596 |
| Percentage | 75.9% | 21.6% |
- County results Barrasso: 50–60% 60–70% 70–80% 80–90%
U.S. senator before election
John Barrasso
Republican
Elected U.S. senator
John Barrasso
Republican

Incumbent Republican John Barrasso won re-election to a first full term.

Republican state senator John Barrasso was appointed to the U.S. Senate on June 22, 2007, by then-governor Dave Freudenthal after U.S. senator Craig Thomas died on June 4, 2007. John Barrasso defeated Nick Carter with 73.4% of the vote in the 2008 special U.S. senatorial election to serve the remainder of the senatorial term. Barrasso remained highly popular in the state with 69% of voters approving of him.

Wyoming Republican primary
| Party | Candidate | Votes | % |
|---|---|---|---|
| Republican | John Barrasso (incumbent) | 73,516 | 89.9 |
| Republican | Thomas Bleming | 5,080 | 6.2 |
| Republican | Emmett Mavy | 2,873 | 3.5 |
| Republican | Write-in | 279 | 0.3 |
| Total votes | | 81,748 | 100 |

Wyoming Democratic primary
| Party | Candidate | Votes | % |
|---|---|---|---|
| Democratic | Tim Chesnut | 9,173 | 53.7 |
| Democratic | Al Hamburg | 4,630 | 27.1 |
| Democratic | William Bryk | 3,047 | 17.8 |
| Democratic | Write-in | 222 | 1.3 |
| Total votes | | 17,072 | 100 |

2012 United States Senate election in Wyoming
| Party | Candidate | Votes | % | ±% |
|---|---|---|---|---|
| Republican | John Barrasso (incumbent) | 184,531 | 75.90 | +2.55% |
| Democratic | Tim Chesnut | 52,596 | 21.60 | −4.93% |
| Wyoming Country | Joel Otto | 6,138 | 2.60 | |
| Majority | | 131,935 | 54.30 | +7.47% |
| Turnout | | 243,265 | | |
| Republican hold | | Swing | | |

== See also ==
- 2012 United States elections
  - 2012 United States gubernatorial elections
  - 2012 United States presidential election
  - 2012 United States House of Representatives elections
- 112th United States Congress
- 113th United States Congress
