= 2014 United States Senate election in West Virginia =

- November 4, 2014
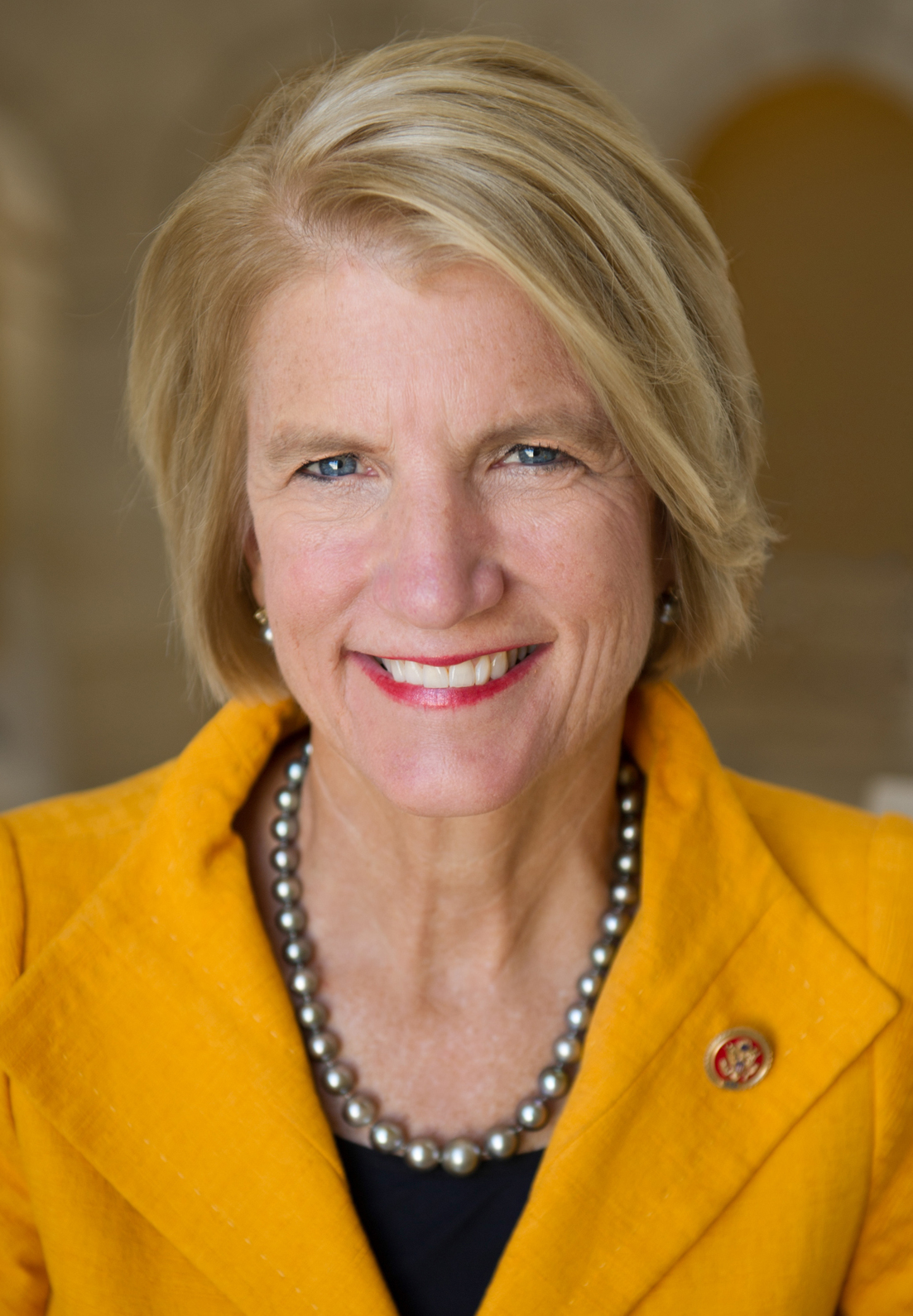

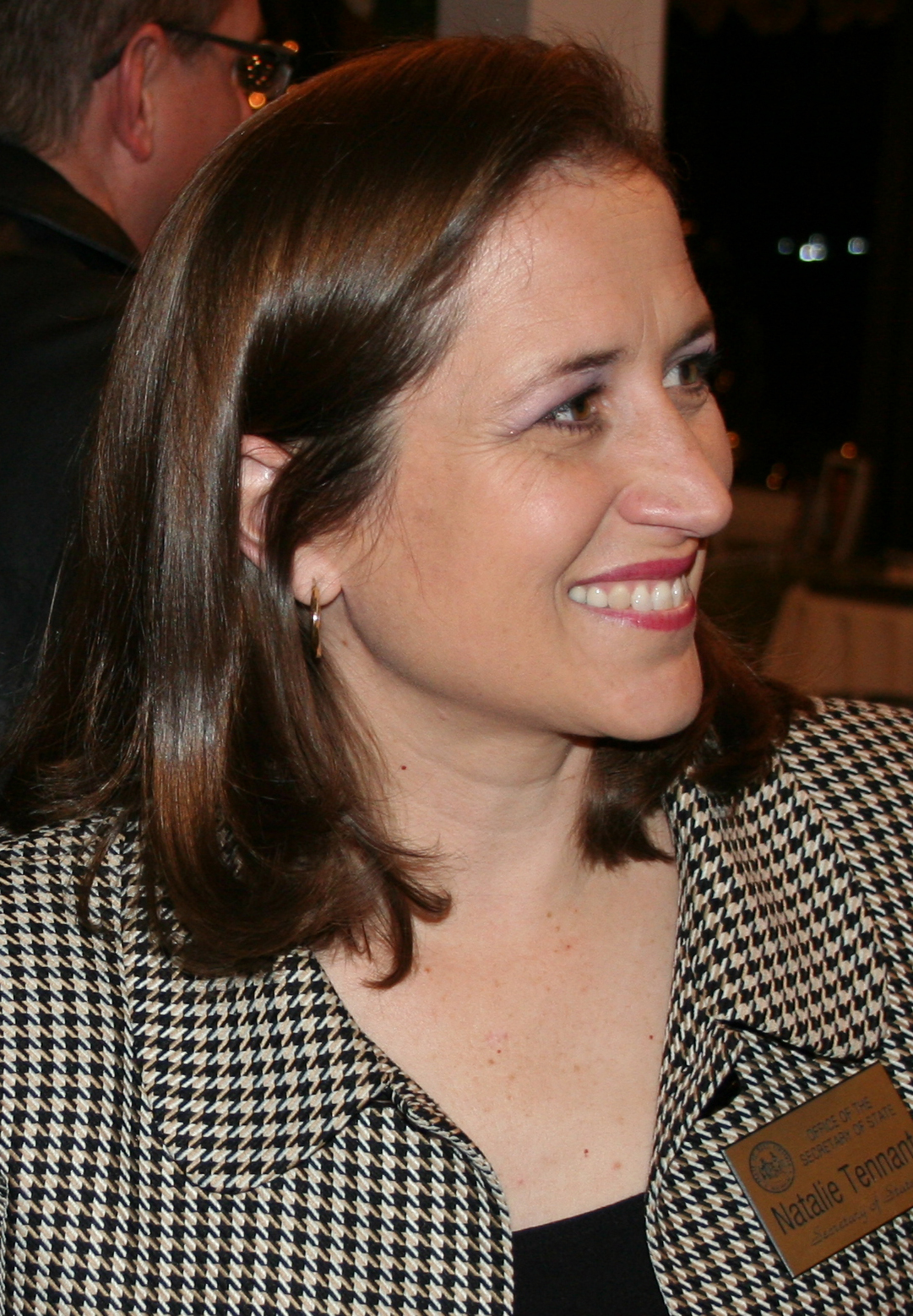
Nominee	Shelley Moore Capito	Natalie Tennant
Party	Republican	Democratic
Popular vote	281,820	156,360
Percentage	62.12%	34.47%
- Moore Capito: 50–60% 60–70% 70–80% 80–90%
U.S. senator before election
Jay Rockefeller
Democratic
Elected U.S. Senator
Shelley Moore Capito
Republican

The 2014 United States Senate election in West Virginia was held on November 4, 2014, to elect a member of the United States Senate to represent the State of West Virginia, concurrently with elections to the United States Senate in other states, elections to the United States House of Representatives, and various state and local elections. This was the fifth consecutive even-numbered year in which a Senate election was held in West Virginia, after elections in 2006, 2008, 2010, and 2012. This was one of the seven Democratic-held Senate seats up for election in a state that Mitt Romney won in the 2012 presidential election.

Incumbent Democratic senator Jay Rockefeller decided to retire rather than run for reelection for a sixth term. The Democrats nominated Secretary of State of West Virginia Natalie Tennant, and the Republicans nominated U.S. Representative Shelley Moore Capito. This was the thirteenth U.S. Senate election that involved two major party female nominees in U.S. history.

Capito defeated Tennant and became the first female senator elected in West Virginia's history as well as the first Republican elected to the Senate from West Virginia since 1956, and their first victory in this seat since 1942. The results of this election were a near complete flip from 2008, when Democrat Jay Rockefeller received 64% of the vote. This was the first open-seat non-special election since 1984.

== Democratic primary ==
=== Candidates ===
==== Declared ====
- Dennis Melton
- Natalie Tennant, secretary of state of West Virginia and candidate for governor in 2011
- David Wamsley, developer

==== Withdrew ====
- Sheirl Fletcher, former Republican state delegate and candidate for the U.S. Senate in 2008, 2010 and 2012

==== Declined ====
- Ralph Baxter, attorney and CEO of Orrick, Herrington & Sutcliffe
- Mike Callaghan, former assistant United States Attorney and former chairman of the West Virginia Democratic Party
- Gaston Caperton, former governor
- Nick Casey, former chairman of the West Virginia Democratic Party (running for the U.S. House)
- Robin Davis, justice for the Supreme Court of Appeals of West Virginia
- Glen Gainer III, West Virginia state auditor (running for WV-01)
- Booth Goodwin, United States attorney for the Southern District of West Virginia
- Carte Goodwin, former U.S. senator
- Walt Helmick, West Virginia agriculture commissioner
- Jim Humphreys, former state senator and nominee for West Virginia's 2nd congressional district in 2000 and 2002
- Jeff Kessler, president of the West Virginia Senate and candidate for governor in 2011
- Corey Palumbo, state senator
- John Perdue, West Virginia state treasurer and candidate for governor in 2011
- Nick Preservati, attorney
- Nick Rahall, U.S. representative
- Jay Rockefeller, incumbent U.S. senator
- Allen Tackett, former adjutant general of the West Virginia National Guard
- Rick Thompson, West Virginia secretary of veterans affairs, former speaker of the West Virginia House of Delegates and candidate for governor in 2011
- Earl Ray Tomblin, governor of West Virginia
- Erik Wells, state senator
- Bob Wise, former governor

=== Endorsements ===
Natalie Tennant

Individuals

- Heidi Heitkamp, U.S. senator from North Dakota
- Jeff Kessler, president of the West Virginia Senate and candidate for governor in 2011
- Carole King, singer
- Joe Manchin, U.S. senator
- Tim Miley, speaker of the West Virginia House of Delegates
- Michelle Obama, First Lady of the United States
- Jay Rockefeller, incumbent U.S. senator
- Allen Tackett, former adjutant general of the West Virginia National Guard
- Earl Ray Tomblin, governor of West Virginia
- Elizabeth Warren, U.S. senator from Massachusetts

Organizations

- American Federation of Teachers
- Council for a Livable World
- Democratic Senatorial Campaign Committee
- EMILY's List
- Italian American Democratic Leadership Council
- United Mine Workers of America (UMWA)
- West Virginia AFL-CIO
- West Virginia Education Association
- Women's Political Committee

Newspapers

- The Charleston Gazette

=== Polling ===
Poll source	Date(s) administered	Sample size	Margin of error	Sheirl Fletcher	David Harless	Natalie Tennant	David Wamsley	Other	Undecided
Public Policy Polling	September 19–22, 2013	600	± 4%	8%	3%	51%	4%	—	34%

Hypothetical polling

Poll source	Date(s) administered	Sample size	Margin of error	Ralph Baxter	Robin Davis	Nick Preservati	Natalie Tennant	Other	Undecided
MBE Research	May 1–2, 2013	207		1%	12%	1%	40%	—	38%

Poll source	Date(s) administered	Sample size	Margin of error	Robin Davis	Carte Goodwin	Nick Rahall	Other	Undecided
Harper Polling	January 21, 2013	579	± 4.07%	17%	8%	38%	—	37%

=== Results ===
Results by county Tennant: 50–60%; 60–70%; 70–80%; 80–90%

Democratic primary results
Party	Candidate	Votes	%
Democratic	Natalie Tennant	104,598	77.95%
Democratic	Dennis Melton	15,817	11.79%
Democratic	David Wamsley	13,773	10.26%
Total votes		134,188	100.00%

== Republican primary ==
=== Candidates ===
==== Declared ====
- Larry Butcher
- Shelley Moore Capito, U.S. representative
- Matthew Dodrill

==== Withdrew ====
- Rick LeMasters, retired Marine officer and state employee
- Pat McGeehan, former state delegate and former Air Force Intelligence officer and captain (running for House of Delegates)
- Scott Regan, Democratic candidate for the state senate in 2010
- Edwin Vanover, former Bramwell police chief and Democratic candidate for the House of Delegates in 2012

==== Declined ====
- Bill Maloney, businessman and nominee for governor in 2011 and 2012
- David McKinley, U.S. representative
- Patrick Morrisey, attorney general of West Virginia
- John Raese, businessman, nominee for the U.S. Senate in 1984, 2006, 2010 and 2012 and candidate for governor in 1988

=== Endorsements ===
Shelley Moore Capito

Politicians

- Lauren Ellifritz, Mineral County clerk
- Jerry Whisner, Mineral County commissioner

Organizations

- Americans for Legal Immigration
- Charleston Regional Chamber of Commerce
- Maggie's List
- NFIB SAFE Trust
- NRA-Political Victory Fund
- United States Chamber of Commerce
- WESPAC – WV Medical Association
- West Virginia Chamber of Commerce
- West Virginia Farm PAC
- West Virginia Manufacturers Association
- West Virginians for Coal
- West Virginians for Liberty
- West Virginians for Life PAC

Newspapers

- Moorefield Examiner

Individuals

- Donald Trump, businessman

=== Polling ===
Poll source	Date(s) administered	Sample size	Margin of error	Shelley Moore Capito	Rick Lemasters	Pat McGeehan	Patrick Morrisey	Scott Regan	Edwin Vanover	Undecided
Harper Polling	January 21, 2013	462	± 4.56%	73%	—	—	10%	—	—	18%
Public Policy Polling	September 19–22, 2013	348	± 5.3%	72%	5%	4%	—	1%	2%	17%
Harper Polling	September 24–25, 2013	354	± 5.21%	77%	—	7%	—	—	—	16%

Poll source	Date(s) administered	Sample size	Margin of error	Shelley Moore Capito	Someone more conservative	Undecided
Public Policy Polling	September 19–22, 2013	348	± 5.3%	65%	21%	14%

Hypothetical polling

Poll source	Date(s) administered	Sample size	Margin of error	Shelley Moore Capito	David McKinley	Undecided
Harper Polling	January 21, 2013	462	± 4.56%	70.5%	14.75%	14.75%

=== Results ===
Republican primary results
Party	Candidate	Votes	%
Republican	Shelley Moore Capito	74,655	87.50%
Republican	Matthew Dodrill	7,072	8.29%
Republican	Larry Butcher	3,595	4.21%
Total votes		85,322	100.00%

== Independents and third parties ==
=== Candidates ===
==== Declared ====
- Bob Henry Baber (Mountain Party), writer, former mayor of Richwood, nominee for governor of West Virginia in 2011 and nominee for the U.S. Senate in 2012
- John Buckley (Libertarian Party), attorney, retired law clerk, former Virginia state delegate, and cousin of William F. Buckley, Jr.
- Phil Hudok (Constitution Party), nominee for West Virginia's 2nd congressional district in 2010

==== Withdrawn ====
- Martin Staunton (Independent), former TV anchor (moved to Georgia)

== General election ==
=== Debates ===
A televised debate between Tennant and Capito was held on October 7 in Charleston.

- Complete video of debate

=== Predictions ===
Source	Ranking	As of
The Cook Political Report	Likely R (flip)	November 3, 2014
Sabato's Crystal Ball	Safe R (flip)	November 3, 2014
Rothenberg Political Report	Safe R (flip)	November 3, 2014
Real Clear Politics	Likely R (flip)	November 3, 2014

=== Polling ===
Poll source	Date(s) administered	Sample size	Margin of error	Natalie Tennant (D)	Shelley Moore Capito (R)	Other	Undecided
West Virginia Poll	August 15–22, 2013	400	± 4.9%	40%	45%	—	15%
Public Policy Polling	September 19–22, 2013	1,110	± 2.9%	36%	50%	—	14%
Harper Polling	September 24–25, 2013	640	± 3.87%	34%	51%	—	15%
Clarity Campaigns	January 29–30, 2014	1,727	± 2.35%	39%	45%	—	16%
Rasmussen Reports	February 19–20, 2014	500	± 4.5%	35%	49%	4%	12%
Vox Populi Polling	April 16–17, 2014	571	± 4.1%	33%	49%	—	19%
Rasmussen Reports	May 14–15, 2014	750	± 4%	39%	48%	5%	9%
West Virginia Poll	May 19–22, 2014	400	± 4.9%	38%	49%	—	13%
CBS News/NYT/YouGov	July 5–24, 2014	1,750	± 2.7%	40%	47%	1%	11%
Rasmussen Reports	August 19–20, 2014	750	± 4%	33%	50%	—	17%
West Virginia Poll	August 15–23, 2014	401	± 4.9%	37%	54%	—	9%
CBS News/NYT/YouGov	August 18 – September 2, 2014	1,284	± 4%	32%	55%	1%	12%
CBS News/NYT/YouGov	September 20 – October 1, 2014	1,066	± 4%	33%	56%	1%	9%
Rasmussen Reports	September 30 – October 1, 2014	750	± 4%	39%	50%	3%	8%
CBS News/NYT/YouGov	October 16–23, 2014	877	± 5%	34%	56%	0%	10%

Hypothetical polling

With Davis

Poll source	Date(s) administered	Sample size	Margin of error	Robin Davis (D)	Shelley Moore Capito (R)	Other	Undecided
Harper Polling	January 21, 2013	1,444	± 2.58%	24%	51%	—	25%
MBE Research	May 1–2, 2013	406	± 4.87%	32%	51%	—	18%

With Fletcher

Poll source	Date(s) administered	Sample size	Margin of error	Sheirl Fletcher (D)	Shelley Moore Capito (R)	Other	Undecided
Public Policy Polling	September 19–22, 2013	1,110	± 2.9%	26%	54%	—	20%

Poll source	Date(s) administered	Sample size	Margin of error	Sheirl Fletcher (D)	Pat McGeehan (R)	Other	Undecided
Public Policy Polling	September 19–22, 2013	1,110	± 2.9%	24%	27%	—	48%

With Goodwin

Poll source	Date(s) administered	Sample size	Margin of error	Carte Goodwin (D)	Shelley Moore Capito (R)	Other	Undecided
Harper Polling	January 21, 2013	1,444	± 2.58%	19%	53%	—	28%

With Rahall

Poll source	Date(s) administered	Sample size	Margin of error	Nick Rahall (D)	Shelley Moore Capito (R)	Other	Undecided
Harper Polling	January 21, 2013	1,444	± 2.58%	32%	50%	—	18%

With Rockefeller

Poll source	Date(s) administered	Sample size	Margin of error	Jay Rockefeller (D)	Shelley Moore Capito (R)	Other	Undecided
Public Policy Polling	September 30 – October 2, 2011	932	± 3.2%	44%	48%	—	7%
Repass & Partners	August 22–25, 2012	401	± 4.9%	44%	48%	—	8%

With Tennant

Poll source	Date(s) administered	Sample size	Margin of error	Natalie Tennant (D)	Pat McGeehan (R)	Other	Undecided
Public Policy Polling	September 19–22, 2013	1,110	± 2.9%	42%	32%	—	26%

=== Results ===
2014 United States Senate election in West Virginia
Party	Candidate	Votes	%	±%
Republican	Shelley Moore Capito	281,820	62.12%	+25.86%
Democratic	Natalie Tennant	156,360	34.47%	−29.27%
Libertarian	John Buckley	7,409	1.63%	N/A
Mountain	Bob Henry Baber	5,504	1.21%	N/A
Constitution	Phil Hudok	2,566	0.57%	N/A
Total votes		453,659	100.00%	N/A
Republican gain from Democratic				

==== By county ====
County	Shelley Moore Capito Republican		Natalie Tennant Democratic		Various candidates Other parties		Margin		Total
County	#	%	#	%	#	%	#	%	Total
Barbour	2,772	65.7%	1,265	30.0%	179	4.3%	1,507	35.7%	4,216
Berkeley	14,446	67.2%	6,396	29.7%	667	3.1%	8,050	37.7%	21,509
Boone	3,478	53.8%	2,798	43.3%	186	2.9%	680	10.5%	6,462
Braxton	2,050	55.8%	1,509	41.1%	115	3.1%	541	14.7%	3,674
Brooke	3,606	56.7%	2,453	38.6%	304	4.7%	1,153	18.1%	6,363
Cabell	12,687	59.8%	7,955	37.5%	587	2.8%	4,732	22.3%	21,229
Calhoun	1,104	62.0%	605	34.0%	72	4.0%	499	28.0%	1,781
Clay	1,464	64.1%	747	32.7%	73	3.2%	717	31.4%	2,284
Doddridge	1,262	75.1%	339	20.2%	79	4.7%	923	54.9%	1,680
Fayette	5,473	53.5%	4,354	42.6%	399	3.9%	1,119	10.9%	10,226
Gilmer	989	58.6%	572	33.9%	126	7.5%	417	24.7%	1,687
Grant	2,265	83.5%	354	13.0%	95	3.5%	1,911	70.5%	2,714
Greenbrier	5,515	57.7%	3,663	38.3%	377	4.0%	1,852	19.4%	9,555
Hampshire	3,795	72.1%	1,259	23.9%	210	3.9%	2,536	48.2%	5,264
Hancock	4,729	61.8%	2,528	33.0%	400	5.3%	2,201	28.8%	7,657
Hardy	2,335	68.9%	894	26.4%	158	4.7%	1,441	42.5%	3,387
Harrison	10,375	57.8%	6,910	38.5%	669	3.7%	3,465	19.3%	17,954
Jackson	5,474	65.2%	2,697	32.1%	119	2.6%	2,777	33.1%	8,390
Jefferson	7,943	57.8%	21,039	38.9%	454	3.3%	2,587	18.9%	13,753
Kanawha	30,747	57.8%	21,039	39.5%	1,453	2.7%	9,708	18.3%	53,239
Lewis	3,054	65.6%	1,412	30.3%	187	4.1%	1,642	35.3%	4,653
Lincoln	2,709	60.8%	1,599	35.9%	144	3.2%	1,110	24.9%	4,452
Logan	4,700	61.5%	2,780	36.4%	163	2.1%	1,920	25.1%	7,643
Marion	7,329	50.9%	6,575	45.7%	499	3.5%	754	5.2%	14,403
Marshall	5,590	66.3%	2,607	30.9%	235	2.8%	2,983	35.4%	8,432
Mason	4,448	63.5%	2,371	33.8%	191	2.7%	2,077	29.7%	7,010
McDowell	1,909	52.8%	1,615	44.7%	89	2.5%	294	8.1%	3,613
Mercer	9,668	66.8%	4,356	30.1%	452	3.2%	5,312	36.7%	14,476
Mineral	4,735	71.8%	1,538	23.3%	318	4.9%	3,197	48.5%	6,591
Mingo	3,789	62.0%	2,180	35.7%	138	2.2%	1,609	26.3%	6,107
Monongalia	10,515	54.3%	8,063	41.6%	791	4.0%	2,452	12.7%	19,369
Monroe	2,257	62.7%	1,220	33.9%	121	3.4%	1,037	28.8%	3,598
Morgan	3,452	68.3%	1,396	27.6%	205	4.1%	2,056	40.7%	5,053
Nicholas	4,295	63.2%	2,173	32.0%	332	4.8%	2,122	29.2%	6,800
Ohio	7,656	64.5%	3,889	32.7%	333	2.8%	3,767	31.8%	11,878
Pendleton	1,557	73.7%	515	24.4%	42	2.0%	1,042	49.3%	2,114
Pleasants	1,150	66.5%	507	29.3%	72	4.2%	643	37.2%	1,729
Pocahontas	1,426	56.8%	894	35.6%	190	7.6%	532	21.2%	2,510
Preston	4,857	67.4%	2,023	28.1%	330	4.7%	2,834	41.3%	7,210
Putnam	11,103	69.2%	4,543	28.3%	392	2.5%	6,560	40.9%	16,038
Raleigh	13,558	65.9%	6,388	31.1%	616	3.0%	7,170	34.8%	20,562
Randolph	4,499	64.5%	2,116	30.4%	355	5.1%	2,383	34.1%	6,970
Ritchie	2,118	75.5%	555	19.8%	132	4.8%	1,563	55.7%	2,805
Roane	2,418	60.9%	1,408	35.5%	131	3.5%	1,010	25.4%	3,968
Summers	1,806	56.0%	1,281	39.7%	140	4.3%	525	16.3%	3,227
Taylor	2,667	61.6%	1,521	35.1%	141	3.4%	1,146	26.5%	4,331
Tucker	1,741	64.5%	815	30.2%	144	5.3%	926	34.3%	2,700
Tyler	1,518	71.6%	499	23.5%	104	4.9%	1,019	48.1%	2,121
Upshur	4,356	70.8%	1,576	25.6%	221	3.6%	2,780	45.2%	6,153
Wayne	6,028	60.5%	3,649	36.6%	291	2.9%	2,379	23.9%	9,968
Webster	1,105	55.4%	795	39.8%	95	4.8%	310	15.6%	1,995
Wetzel	2,423	59.5%	1,491	36.6%	158	3.8%	932	22.9%	4,072
Wirt	1,001	69.1%	382	26.4%	63	4.5%	619	42.8%	1,448
Wood	14,723	67.9%	6,226	28.7%	720	3.4%	8,497	39.2%	21,669
Wyoming	3,152	63.0%	1,712	34.2%	137	2.7%	1,440	28.8%	5,001
Totals	281,820	62.1%	156,360	34.5%	15,479	3.4%	125,460	27.6%	453,659

Counties that flipped from Democratic to Republican

- Barbour (largest city: Philippi)
- Cabell (largest city: Huntington)
- Calhoun (largest city: Grantsville)
- Clay (largest city: Clay)
- Gilmer (largest city: Glenville)
- Greenbrier (largest city: Lewisburg)
- Hancock (largest city: Weirton)
- Hardy (largest city: Moorefield)
- Jackson (largest city: Ravenswood)
- Jefferson (largest city: Charles Town)
- Lewis (largest city: Weston)
- Marshall (largest city: Moundsville)
- Mason (largest city: Point Pleasant)
- Mercer (largest city: Bluefield)
- Monongalia (largest city: Morgantown)
- Monroe (largest city: Peterstown)
- Nicholas (largest city: Summersville)
- Ohio (largest city: Wheeling)
- Pendleton (largest city: Franklin)
- Pleasants (largest city: St. Marys)
- Pocahontas (largest city: Marlinton)
- Raleigh (largest city: Beckley)
- Randolph (largest city: Elkins)
- Roane (largest city: Spencer)
- Summers (largest city: Hinton)
- Taylor (largest city: Grafton)
- Tucker (largest city: Parsons)
- Tyler (largest city: Paden City)
- Wayne (largest city: Kenova)
- Wetzel (largest city: New Martinsville)
- Harrison (largest city: Clarksburg)
- Kanawha (largest city: Charleston)
- Lincoln (largest city: Hamlin)
- Wyoming (largest city: Mullens)
- Brooke (largest borough: Wellsburg)
- Fayette (largest city: Fayetteville)
- Logan (largest borough: Logan)
- Mingo (largest borough: Williamson)
- Boone (largest city: Madison)
- Braxton (largest town: Sutton)
- Marion (largest city: Fairmont)
- McDowell (largest city: Welch)
- Webster (largest town: Webster Springs)
- Berkeley (largest municipality: Martinsburg)
- Hampshire (largest municipality: Romney)
- Mineral (largest municipality: Keyser)
- Morgan (largest municipality: Berkeley Springs)
- Upshur (largest municipality: Buckhannon)
- Wirt (largest municipality: Elizabeth)
- Putnam (largest municipality: Hurricane)
- Preston (largest municipality: Kingwood)
- Wood (largest municipality: Parkersburg)

==== By congressional district ====
Moore Capito won all three congressional districts.

District	Tennant	Moore Capito	Representative
1st	33.92%	62.19%	David McKinley
2nd	33.72%	63.13%	Alex Mooney
3rd	35.86%	60.94%	Evan Jenkins

== See also ==
- 2014 United States Senate elections
- 2014 United States elections
