= Božo =

Božo (Serbian: Божо) is a South Slavic masculine given name, cognate of the English Theo, and, similarly, a popular abbreviation of the name - Božidar, English Theodore. Notable people with the name include:

- Božo Bakota (1950–2015), Croatian footballer
- Božo Biškupić (born 1938), Croatian politician and lawyer
- Božo Broketa (1922–1985), Yugoslavian football (soccer) player
- Božo Đumić (born 1992), Serbian professional basketball player
- Božo Đurković (born 1972), retired Serbian football player
- Božo Janković (1951–1993), Bosnian Serb football player
- Božo Koprivica, essayist, dramatic adviser and literary critic from Montenegro of Yugoslavian ethnicity
- Božo Kos (1931–2009), Slovene illustrator, caricaturist and comics artist
- Božo Kovačević (footballer) (born 1979), Austrian footballer of Serbian descent
- Božo Kovačević (politician) (born 1955), the Ambassador Extraordinary and Plenipotentiary of the Republic of Croatia to the Russian Federation from 2004 to 2009
- Božo Ljubić (born 1949), Croat politician of Bosnia and Herzegovina
- Božo Milić (born 1981), Montenegrin professional footballer
- Božo Nikolić (1946–2010), Croat politician from Montenegro representing the Croatian Civic Initiative
- Božo Petek, the author of two books on model aircraft building published in Slovene in 1946 and 1953
- Božo Petrov (born 1979), Croatian politician and psychiatrist who currently serves as mayor of Metković
- Božo Škerlj (1908–1961), Slovene anthropologist, author of eleven books and over 200 scientific articles
- Božo Skoko (born 1976), associate professor of public relations at the Faculty of Political Science, University of Zagreb
- Božo Starčević (born 1988), male Greco-Roman wrestler from Croatia
- Božo Vrećo (born 1983), Bosnian musician
- Božo Vuletić (born 1958), won an Olympic gold medal as a member of the Yugoslav water polo team at the 1984 Olympics

== See also ==
- Božović
- Bozo (disambiguation)
- Bonzo (disambiguation)
- Bozok (disambiguation)
- Bozoó
