= Bozo =

Bozo or bozo may refer to:

== People ==
- Bozo people, a fishing people of the central Niger delta in Mali
  - Bozo language, languages of the Bozo people
- Frédéric Bozo, history professor at the University of Paris III: Sorbonne Nouvelle
- Bozo Miller (1918–2008), American restaurant owner, Gastronomical Champion of competitive eating, and Guinness World Record holder
- Bozó (born 1952), full name Luiz Augusto de Aguiar, Brazilian footballer

== Art, entertainment, and media ==
=== Fictional characters and mascots ===
- Bozo (comic strip), a pantomime comic strip by Foxo Reardon
- Bozo (mascot), a former wildcat kept as a live mascot for the University of New Hampshire
- Bozo the Clown, a clown character in the United States
- Bozo the Iron Man, a 1930s/40s era comic book superhero

=== Film and television ===
- Bozo (film), a 2013 Japanese drama film
- The Bozo Show, locally produced children's television program on WGN-TV in Chicago and on WGN America

=== Music ===
- Bozo (album), the debut album of the singer/songwriter Lida Husik
- "Bozo", a 1951 song by Félix Leclerc from his debut album, Chante ses derniers succès sur disques
- "Bozos", a single by the UK band The Levellers
- Bozo, an album by American rapper Saint Dog

== Computing ==
- Bozo bit, a copy protection system in 1980s Apple Macintosh operating system
- Bozo filter or email filtering, the processing of email to organize it according to specified criteria
- Bozo sort, a particularly ineffective sorting algorithm based on the generate and test paradigm

== Slang ==
- Bozo, a slang phrase for an idiot

== Other uses ==
- Spee De Bozo, J. Edgar Hoover's dog
- Bozo, nickname of ProRodeo Hall of Fame barrel racing horse, registered name French Flash Hawk
- Bozó (dice game), a Brazilian game related to Yahtzee
- Bozo, a fermented beverage from Central Asia (also spelled boza or bosa)

== See also ==
- Božo, a given name
- Boso (disambiguation)
