= West Virginia's 11th Senate district =

American legislative district

West Virginia's 11th State Senate district
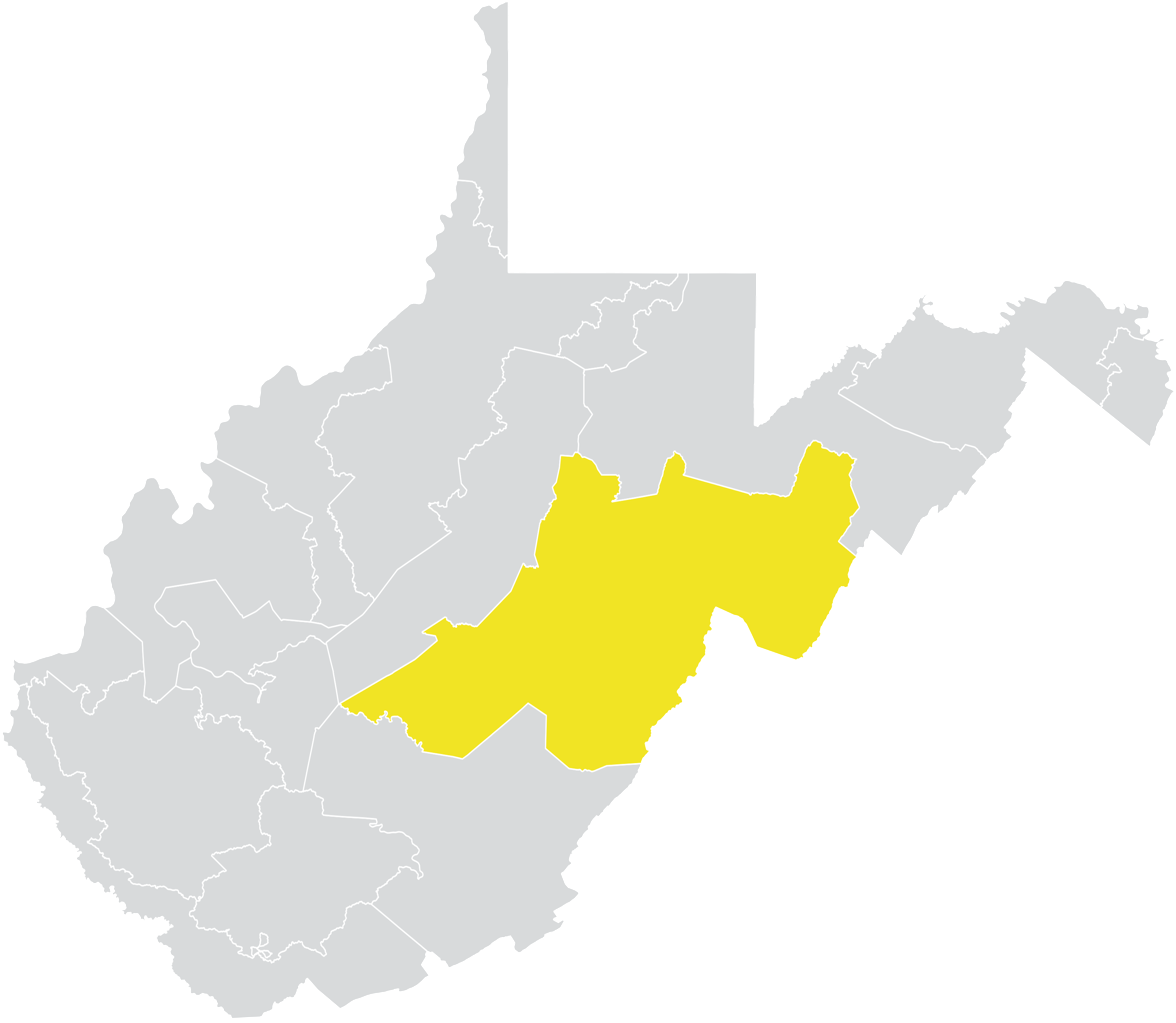
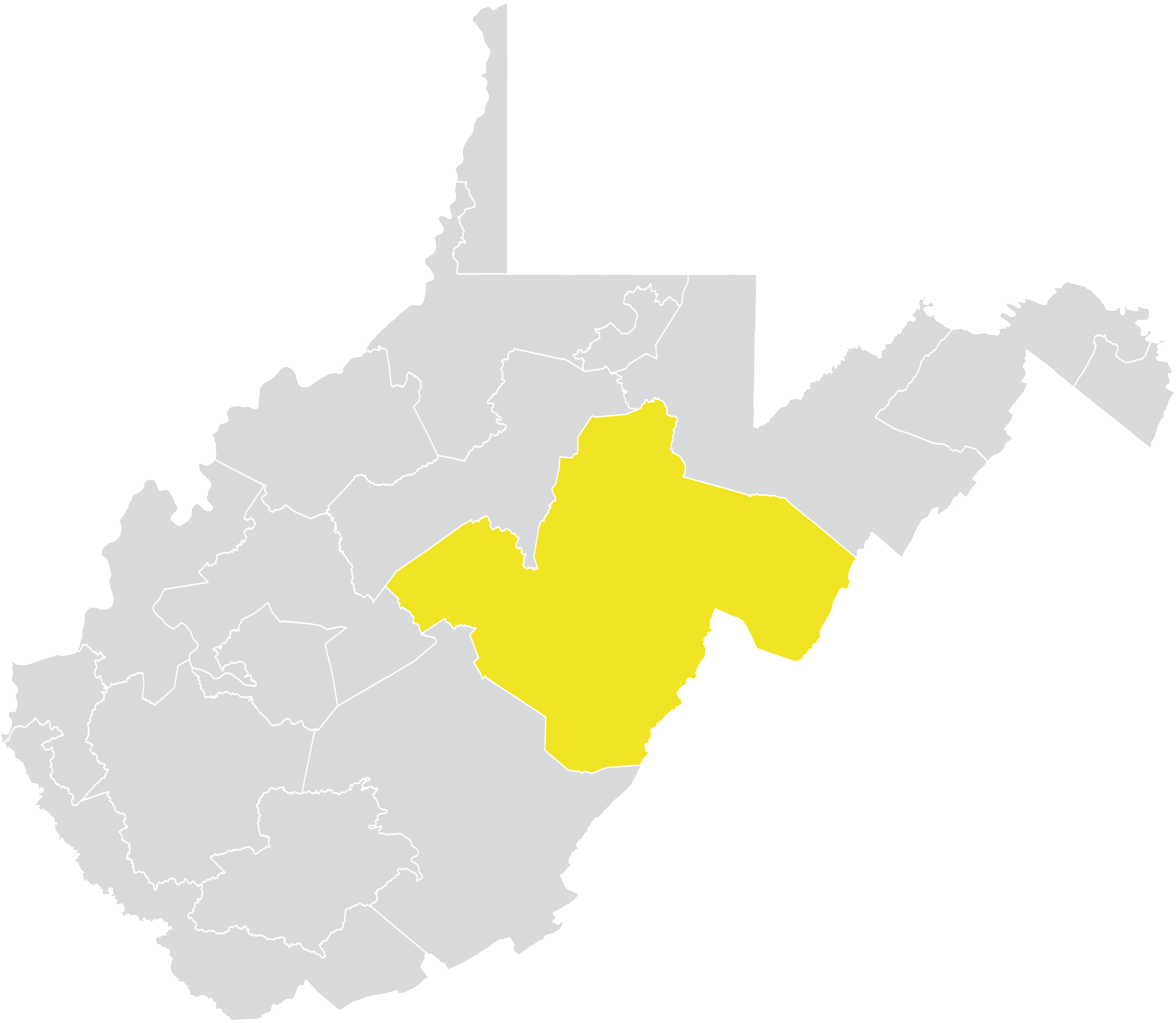
Senator
Bill Hamilton; R–Buckhannon
Robbie Morris; R–Elkins
- Demographics: 97% White; 1% Black; 1% Hispanic; 0% Asian; 1% Other
- Population (2017): 112,494

West Virginia's 11th Senate district is one of 17 districts in the West Virginia Senate. It is currently represented by Republicans Bill Hamilton and Robbie Morris. All districts in the West Virginia Senate elect two members to staggered four-year terms.

== Geography ==
District 11 covers all of Nicholas, Pendleton, Pocahontas, Randolph, Upshur, and Webster Counties, as well as some of southern Grant County, in the eastern part of the state. Communities within the district include Richwood, Summersville, Craigsville, Webster Springs, Marlinton, Buckhannon, Elkins, Franklin, and Petersburg.

The district overlaps with the state's 1st, 2nd, and 3rd congressional districts, and with the 32nd, 41st, 43rd, 44th, 45th, 46th, 54th, and 55th districts of the West Virginia House of Delegates. It borders the state of Virginia. At over 4,400 square miles, it is by far the largest district in the Senate.

== Recent election results ==
=== 2024 ===
2024 West Virginia Senate election, District 11
Primary election
Party	Candidate	Votes	%
Republican	Robbie Morris	9,199	65.9
Republican	Robert L. Karnes (incumbent)	4,765	34.1
Total votes		13,964	100.0
Democratic	Mandy Smith Weirich	5,093	100.0
Total votes		5,093	100.0
General election
Republican	Robbie Morris	31,279	75.9
Democratic	Mandy Smith Weirich	9,913	24.1
Total votes		41,192	100
Republican hold			

=== 2022 ===
2022 West Virginia Senate election, District 11
Party	Candidate	Votes	%
Republican	Bill Hamilton (incumbent)	23,105	100
Total votes		23,105	100

== Historical election results ==
=== 2020 ===
2020 West Virginia Senate election, District 11
Primary election
Party	Candidate	Votes	%
Republican	Robert Karnes	7,778	54.0
Republican	John Pitsenbarger (incumbent)	6,618	46.0
Total votes		14,396	100
General election
Republican	Robert Karnes	23,364	51.4
Democratic	Denise Campbell	22,116	48.6
Total votes		45,480	100
Republican hold			

=== 2018 ===
2018 West Virginia Senate election, District 11
Primary election
Party	Candidate	Votes	%
Republican	Bill Hamilton	6,523	62.3
Republican	Robert Karnes (incumbent)	3,955	37.7
Total votes		10,478	100
Democratic	Laura Finch	5,087	52.4
Democratic	Margaret Kerr Beckwith	4,617	47.6
Total votes		9,704	100
General election
Republican	Bill Hamilton	23,718	70.4
Democratic	Laura Finch	9,953	29.6
Total votes		33,671	100
Republican hold			

=== 2016 ===
2016 West Virginia Senate election, District 11
Party	Candidate	Votes	%
Republican	Greg Boso (incumbent)	20,610	49.4
Democratic	Denise Campbell	19,718	47.3
Mountain	Bruce Breuninger	1,404	3.4
Total votes		41,732	100
Republican hold			

=== 2014 ===
2014 West Virginia Senate election, District 11
Primary election
Party	Candidate	Votes	%
Republican	Robert Karnes	3,327	53.1
Republican	Steve Foster	2,941	46.9
Total votes		6,268	100
General election
Republican	Robert Karnes	15,171	55.6
Democratic	Gregory Tucker (incumbent)	12,122	44.4
Total votes		27,293	100
Republican gain from Democratic			

=== 2012 ===
2012 West Virginia Senate election, District 11
Primary election
Party	Candidate	Votes	%
Democratic	Margaret Kerr Beckwith	7,622	58.8
Democratic	Paul Louk	5,347	41.2
Total votes		12,969	100
General election
Republican	Clark Barnes (incumbent)	24,571	65.5
Democratic	Margaret Kerr Beckwith	12,941	34.5
Total votes		37,512	100
Republican hold			

=== Federal and statewide results ===
Year	Office	Results
2020	President	Trump 76.2 – 22.3%
2016	President	Trump 74.9 – 20.7%
2014	Senate	Capito 66.4 – 29.1%
2012	President	Romney 67.4 – 30.1%
2012	Senate	Manchin 56.6 – 39.7%
2012	Governor	Tomblin 48.3 – 47.5%
