= Božović =

Božović (Cyrillic: Божовић, pronounced [bôːʒoʋitɕ]; plural: Božovići, Божовићи) is a Montenegrin and Serbian surname, and is one of the most common surnames in Montenegro and Serbia. It derives from personal name Božo (Божо), cognate of the English name Theo.

- The part -ov designates possession and is characteristic of Montenegro and as a surname in Bulgaria: Božov means Božo's (in other South Slavic areas: Božin). It also represents the form of surnames, or middle names, given after the father, until the 19th century.
- The -ić part is a diminutive descendant designation, used as a surname from the late 19th or 20th century and may represent the name of a family, or a brotherhood within a clan/tribe or the clan/tribe itself.

Thus the last name can be translated as Božo's son or Božo's daughter or Božo's descendant.

There are several families in Montenegro, Serbia and Bosnia and Herzegovina who carry this last name. The most numerous of the Božovići are the Serbian Old Herzegovina clan of Božovići, who are originally from the Piva River region. More of the Božovići are found in Eastern Herzegovina, in the Užice region, and in Kosovo. Despite their common last name, these families often don't share common genetic origin.

People with last name Božović:

- Bojan Božović, footballer, born 1985
- Janko Božović, Austrian handball player
- Milivoje Božović, basketball player
- Miodrag Božović, coach
- Mladen Božović, footballer, born 1984
- Petar Božović, actor
- Radoman Božović, former Prime Minister of Serbia
- Saša Božović (1912–1995), Serbian medical doctor, writer and Communist (Tito's partisan) military officer.
- Vladimir Božović (footballer), footballer, born 1981
- Vojin Božović, football player and manager, born 1913
- Vukajlo Božović, military commander

Recipients of the Order of the People's Hero of Yugoslavia:

- Božo Božović (1907–1993)
- Vlado Božović (1915–2010)
- Vukosav Božović (1916–1943)
- Dragoljub Božović Žuća (1922–1943)
- Radislav Božović Raško (1910–1942)
- Radomir Božović Raco (1915–2000)
