= Boso =

Boso may refer to:

== People ==
- Boso the Elder (c. 800–855), a Frank from the Bosonid dynasty
- Boso of Provence (850–887), Frankish nobleman and king
- Boso, Margrave of Tuscany (885–936), Burgundian nobleman in Italy
- Boso II of Arles (died 967), Frankish count
- Boso of Merseburg (died 970), German bishop
- Boso of Sant'Anastasia (died c. 1127), cardinal and bishop of Turin
- Boso of Santa Pudenziana (died c. 1178), Italian cardinal
- Boso of Granges (died 1243), bishop of Sion
- Boso of Dovara (died 1291), Italian nobleman
- Boso of Sabbioneta (died 1085), Italian nobleman
- Cap Boso (born 1963), American football player
- Greg Boso (born 1957), West Virginia state senator

== Places ==
- Bōsō Peninsula, in Japan
- Boso, Ghana, a village

== See also ==
- Bōsō Hill Range
- Bozo (disambiguation)
