= 2010 United States Senate special election in West Virginia =

- November 2, 2010
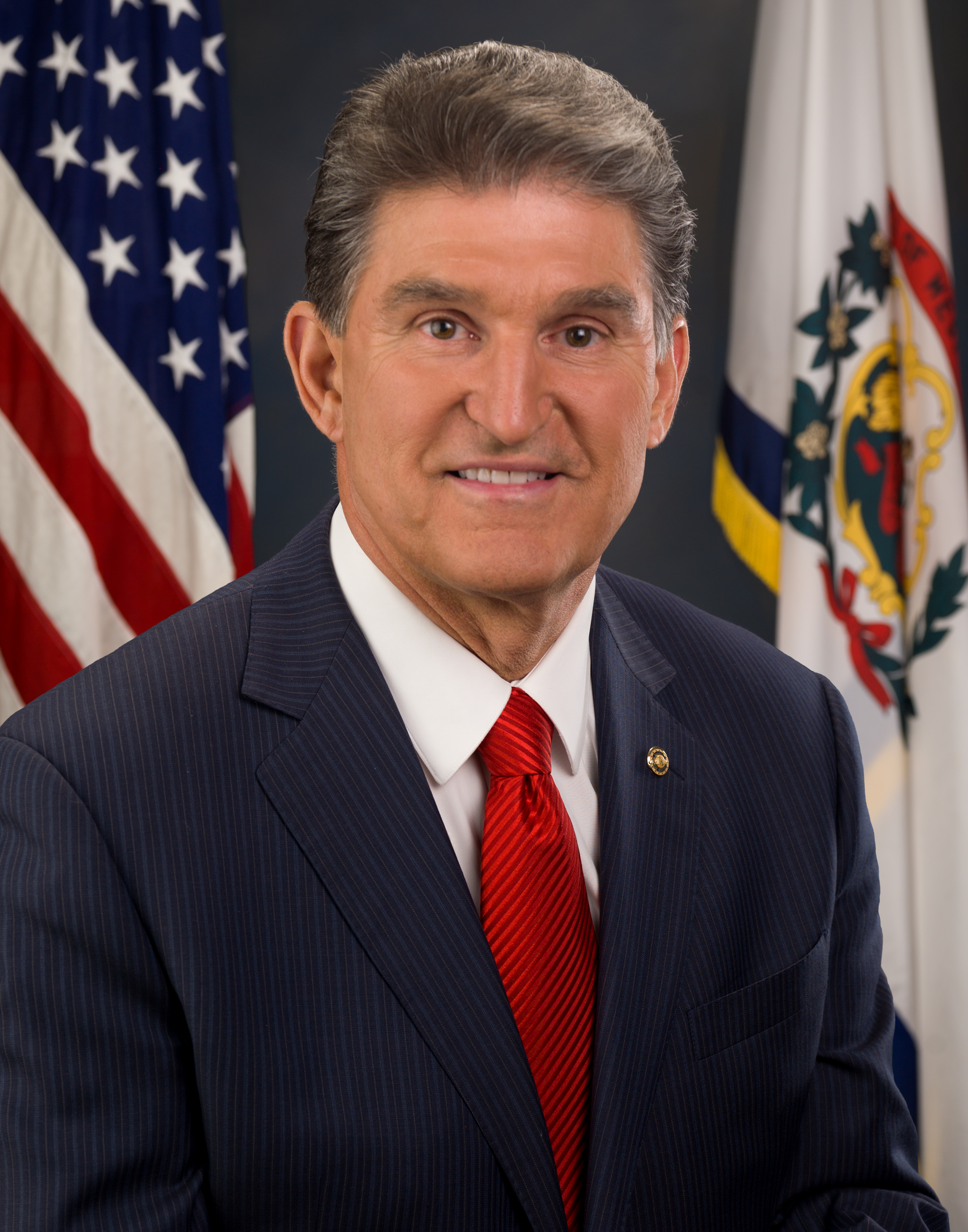

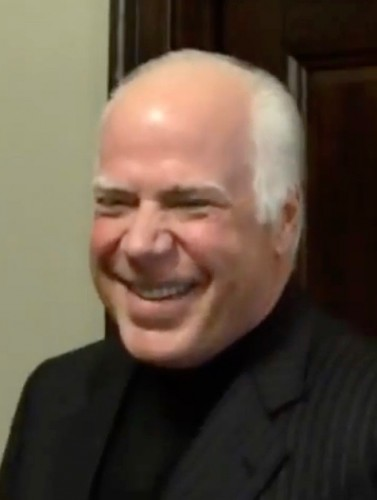
Nominee	Joe Manchin	John Raese
Party	Democratic	Republican
Popular vote	283,358	230,013
Percentage	53.47%	43.40%
- County results Manchin: 40–50% 50–60% 60–70% 70–80% Raese: 40–50% 50–60% 60–70% 70–80%
U.S. senator before election
Carte Goodwin (Note: In July 2010, Goodwin was appointed by Governor Joe Manchin to fill the vacancy caused by the death of Senator Robert Byrd.)
Democratic
Elected U.S. Senator
Joe Manchin
Democratic

The 2010 United States Senate special election in West Virginia was held on November 2, 2010. Incumbent Democratic Senator Robert Byrd died in office on June 28, 2010. Democratic Governor Joe Manchin appointed Carte Goodwin to temporarily fill the vacancy. Goodwin pledged to not run for election to the seat in exchange for the appointment. This was the first open U.S. Senate seat in West Virginia since 1984 and the first in this seat since 1956. Manchin won the open seat and served out the remainder of Byrd's elected term, which ended on January 3, 2013.

This was 1 of 3 Democratic-held Senate seats up for election in a state that John McCain won in the 2008 presidential election; the others were in Arkansas and North Dakota.

== Background ==
Byrd had held his seat in the U.S. Senate since 1959, after having served in the House of Representatives since 1953, making him the then-longest-serving person in Congress. Byrd led his party in the Senate from 1977 to 1989, as Majority Leader or Minority Leader. Afterwards, as the most senior Democrat in the Senate, he served as President pro tempore of the Senate whenever his party was in the majority, including at the time of his death. The Democrats held a 59–41-seat majority in the Senate at the time of Byrd's death.

West Virginia had not elected a Republican to the U.S. Senate since 1956, and voted Democratic in each presidential election from 1932 to 1996 (except for 1956, 1972 & 1984). 77% of voters in the state approved of Democratic governor Joe Manchin, but only 35% approved of Democratic President Barack Obama. Additionally, the Mountain (Green), Libertarian, and Constitution Parties had been slowly growing forces in the state, hoping to capitalize on discontent from both political parties. All three minor parties fielded ballot-qualified candidates in the 2014 Senate election to fill the open seat of retiring longtime Senator Jay Rockefeller.

State law allowed Governor Joe Manchin to make a temporary appointment to the vacant seat. Manchin named a former aide, 36-year-old Carte Goodwin, an attorney and fellow Democrat. Goodwin was sworn in on July 20, 2010, and chose not to run in the special election. Hours later, Manchin announced his intention to seek Byrd's seat.

Manchin urged the West Virginia Legislature to pass legislation scheduling the special election for 2010. Without a revision, state law would not allow an election to be held until 2012. On July 19, legislators hammered out a compromise bill setting an Aug 28 special primary and Nov 2 special election to elect a senator for the roughly two years and five months remaining in Byrd's term. The bill only changed election law for 2010 and will not apply to other future elections. It also allowed a West Virginian who was on the November general election ballot for some other office to also run in the special election.

== Democratic primary ==
=== Candidates ===
==== Nominee ====
- Joe Manchin, incumbent Governor of West Virginia

==== Eliminated in primary ====
- Sheirl Fletcher, former Republican State Delegate
- Ken Hechler, former West Virginia Secretary of State and former U.S. Representative

==== Declined ====
- Carte Goodwin, incumbent U.S. senator (2010)

=== Campaign ===
Despite Manchin's very high popularity in the state, he received two politically experienced challengers. Hechler was a former Secretary of State and U.S. Representative, who at the age of 95 campaigned across the state on an anti-mountaintop removal platform. Fletcher was a former Republican member of the House of Delegates.

=== Results ===
Democratic Primary results
Party	Candidate	Votes	%
Democratic	Joe Manchin	67,498	72.9
Democratic	Ken Hechler	16,039	17.3
Democratic	Sheirl Fletcher	9,035	9.8
Total votes		92,572	100

== Republican primary ==
=== Candidates ===
==== Nominee ====
- John Raese, businessman, nominee for the Senate in 1984 and 2006, and candidate for Governor in 1988

==== Eliminated in primary ====
- Harry C. Bruner Jr., attorney
- Kenneth Culp, Vietnam War veteran and accountant
- Albert Howard, candidate in the 2008 New Hampshire Republican presidential primary
- Frank Kubic, epigrammatist author
- Lynette Kennedy McQuain, substitute teacher's aide
- Daniel Scott Rebich, concrete contracting business owner
- Thomas Ressler, retired officer of the Maryland Department of Corrections
- Mac Warner, businessman
- Scott H. Williams, wood products industry supervisor and manager

=== Campaign ===
During the Republican primary campaign, only Raese and Warner released television advertisements.

=== Results ===
Republican Primary results
Party	Candidate	Votes	%
Republican	John Raese	38,152	71.4
Republican	Mac Warner	7,892	14.8
Republican	Scott H. Williams	1,530	2.9
Republican	Kenneth Culp	1,364	2.6
Republican	Harry C. Bruner Jr.	1,283	2.4
Republican	Thomas Ressler	1,184	2.2
Republican	Lynette Kennedy McQuain	907	1.7
Republican	Frank Kubic	462	0.9
Republican	Daniel Scott Rebich	450	0.8
Republican	Albert Howard	176	0.3
Total votes		53,400	100

== General election ==
=== Candidates ===
- Jeff Becker (Constitution Party), West Virginia Constitution Party chairman (campaign site, PVS)
- Jesse Johnson (Mountain Party), lobbyist, freelance writer and lecturer
- Joe Manchin (Democratic Party), incumbent Governor of West Virginia
- John Raese (Republican Party), businessman
- John R "Rick" Bartlett (Write In)
- Charles G. "Bud" Railey (Write In)

=== Campaign ===
Manchin's campaign ads emphasized his support from labor unions and Cecil Roberts (President of United Mine Workers of America), while criticizing Raese for "putting profits before people", supporting the elimination of the minimum wage, and supporting the FairTax. Manchin was endorsed by both the AFL–CIO and the U.S. Chamber of Commerce. Raese was endorsed from numerous anti-abortion PACs and FreedomWorks. Raese criticized Manchin for supporting House Bill 103, which is similar to cap and trade.

=== Debates ===
The first and only debate was held October 18. It featured all four Senate candidates. Raese wanted at least three debates.

=== Predictions ===
Source	Ranking	As of
The Cook Political Report	Tossup	October 31, 2010
The Rothenberg Political Report	Tilt D	October 28, 2010
Rasmussen Reports	Tossup	October 30, 2010
RealClearPolitics	Tossup	October 31, 2010
Sabato's Crystal Ball	Lean D	October 28, 2010
CQ Politics	Tossup	October 31, 2010

=== Polling ===
Poll source	Date(s) administered	Sample size	Margin of error	Joe Manchin (D)	John Raese (R)	Other	Undecided
Rasmussen Reports (report)	July 22, 2010	500	± 4.5%	51%	35%	5%	9%
MindField Poll (report)	August 6, 2010	413	± 6.0%	54%	32%	—	14%
Rasmussen Reports (report)	August 29, 2010	500	± 4.5%	48%	42%	4%	7%
Rasmussen Reports (report)	September 8, 2010	500	± 4.5%	50%	45%	2%	3%
Rasmussen Reports (report)	September 19, 2010	750	± 4.0%	50%	43%	1%	5%
Public Policy Polling (report)	September 19, 2010	1,397	± 2.6%	43%	46%	—	10%
Rasmussen Reports (report)	September 27, 2010	500	± 4.5%	46%	48%	2%	4%
Fox News/Pulse Opinion Research (report)	October 2, 2010	1,000	± 3.0%	43%	48%	3%	6%
Rasmussen Reports (report)	October 6, 2010	750	± 4.0%	44%	50%	2%	5%
Public Policy Polling (report)	October 9–10, 2010	1,247	± 2.8%	48%	45%	—	7%
CNN/Time/Opinion Research (report)	October 8–12, 2010	1,507	± 2.5%	44%	44%	4%	—
Marshall University Poll conducted by Orion Strategies (report)	October 11–12, 2010	450	± 4.6%	48%	38%	—	12%
Rasmussen Reports (report)	October 12, 2010	750	± 4.0%	46%	49%	2%	3%
Fox News/Pulse Opinion Research (report)	October 16, 2010	1,000	± 3.0%	45%	48%	2%	4%
Rasmussen Reports (report)	October 19, 2010	750	± 4.0%	43%	50%	2%	5%
Fox News/Pulse Opinion Research (report)	October 23, 2010	1,000	± 3.0%	46%	48%	3%	3%
Public Policy Polling (report)	October 23–24, 2010	1,246	± 2.8%	50%	44%	—	6%
Rasmussen Reports (report)	October 26, 2010	750	± 4.0%	49%	46%	2%	4%
Public Policy Polling (report)	October 30–31, 2010	1,676	± 2.4%	51%	46%	—	3%
Rasmussen Reports (report)	October 31, 2010	750	± 4.0%	50%	46%	1%	3%

=== Fundraising ===
Candidate (Party)	Receipts	Disbursements	Cash on Hand	Debt
John Raese (R)	$3,071,909	$2,728,034	$343,876	$3,273,959
Joe Manchin (D)	$3,351,829	$2,746,439	$605,390	$3,568
Source: Federal Election Commission

=== Results ===
United States Senate special election in West Virginia, 2010 results
Party	Candidate	Votes	%	±%
Democratic	Joe Manchin	283,358	53.47%	−10.96%
Republican	John Raese	230,013	43.40%	+9.69%
Mountain	Jesse Johnson	10,152	1.92%	+0.06%
Constitution	Jeff Becker	6,425	1.21%	N/A
Majority		53,345	10.07%	
Total votes		529,948	100	
Democratic hold		Swing		

==== Counties that flipped from Democratic to Republican ====
- Berkeley (largest municipality: Martinsburg)
- Hampshire (largest municipality: Romney)
- Morgan (largest municipality: Berkeley Springs)
- Grant (largest municipality: Petersburg)
- Hardy (largest municipality: Moorefield)
- Mineral (largest municipality: Keyser)
- Ritchie (largest municipality: Harrisville)
- Pendleton (largest municipality: Franklin)
- Tyler (largest municipality: Paden City)
- Upshur (largest municipality: Buckhannon)
- Preston (largest municipality: Kingwood)
- Putnam (largest municipality: Hurricane)
