= Skoko =

Skoko is a South Slavic surname. It is derived from the word skok, meaning "jump".

The surname is found in Bosnia and Herzegovina, Croatia, Montenegro (Sipanje), North Macedonia and Serbia.

Notable people with the surname include:

- Josip Skoko (born 1975), former Australian footballer of Croatian descent
- Noa Skoko (born 2006), Croatian footballer, son of the former
- Suzana Skoko (born 1971), Croatian sports shooter
- Božo Skoko (born 1976), professor of strategic communication at the University of Zagreb
- Savo Skoko (1923–2013), Serbian historian and Yugoslav army officer
