= The Dominion Post =

The Dominion Post can refer to one of two newspapers:

- The Dominion Post (Wellington), the former name of a newspaper published in the capital of New Zealand. In April 2023, the newspaper was revamped as The Post.
- The Dominion Post (Morgantown), a newspaper in the U.S. state of West Virginia.
