= Robert L. Karnes =

American politician from West Virginia

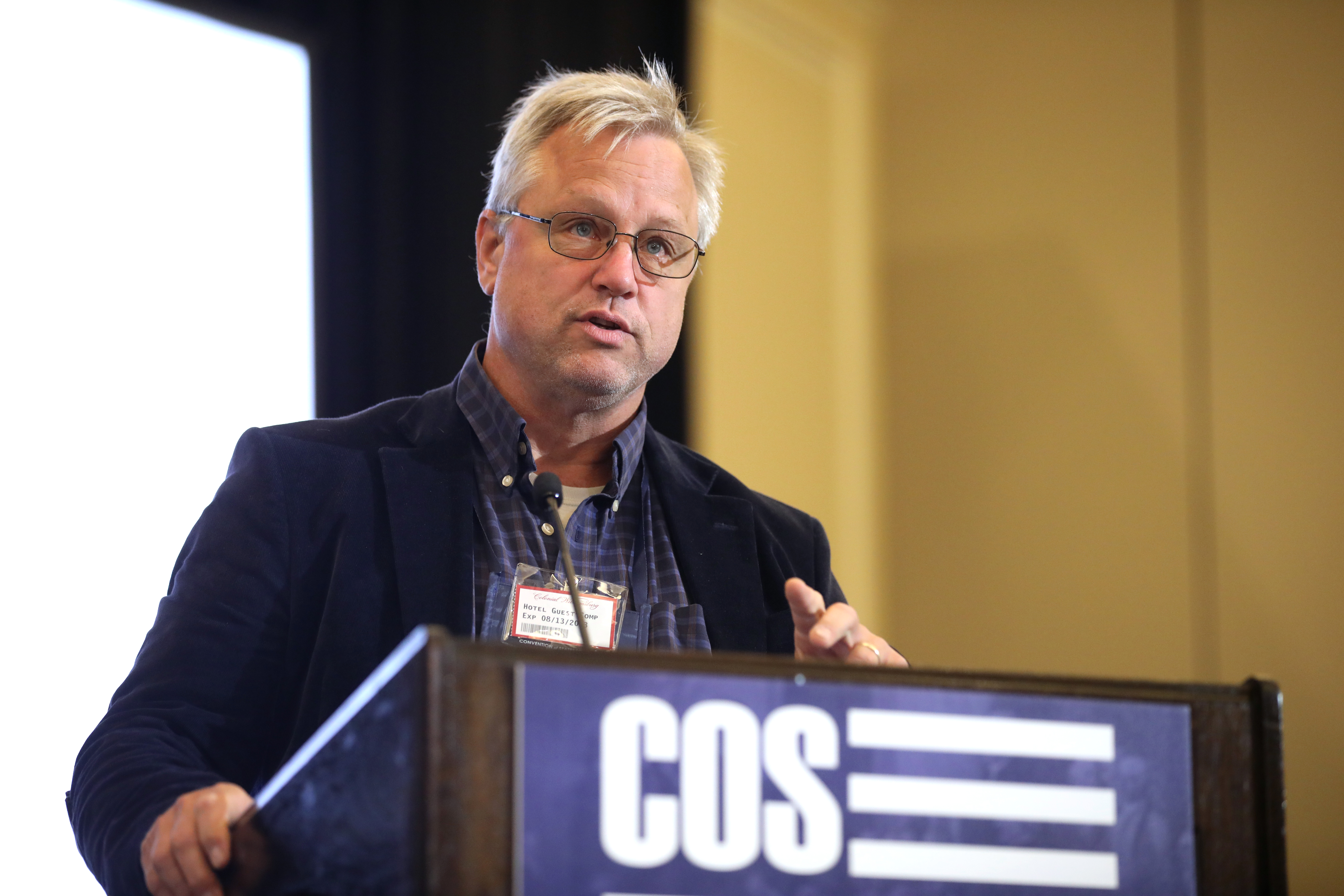

Member of the West Virginia Senate from the 11th district
- In office December 1, 2020 – December 1, 2024
- Preceded by: John Pitsenbarger
- Succeeded by: Robbie Morris
- In office December 1, 2014 – December 1, 2018
- Preceded by: Gregory Tucker
- Succeeded by: Bill Hamilton

Personal details
- Born: May 13, 1969 (age 57) South Charleston, West Virginia, U.S.
- Party: Republican

Robert Lee Karnes is an American politician born in and representing West Virginia. He is known for controversial, conservative rhetoric. He is a former Republican member of the West Virginia Senate, representing the 11th district from 2014 until 2018 and from 2020 to 2024.

Karnes initially took office after defeating Incumbent Democratic Senator Greg Tucker in 2014. This was the first election cycle in which West Virginian Republicans gained control in either the state House or Senate in over 80 years. Karnes then won re-election in the 2020 General Election after defeating Incumbent Republican Senator John Pitsenbarger in the 2020 Republican primary and Democrat Denise Campbell in the general election.

Karnes ran for re-election in 2024 but was defeated in the Republican primary by Robbie Morris.

== Election results ==
West Virginia Senate District 11 (Position B) election, 2020
Party	Candidate	Votes	%
Republican	Robert L. Karnes	23,364	51.4%
Democratic	Denise Campbell	22,116	48.6%
Total votes		45,480	100.0%

West Virginia Senate District 11 (Position A) election, 2014
Party	Candidate	Votes	%
Republican	Robert L. Karnes	15,171	55.59%
Democratic	Gregory Tucker (incumbent)	12,122	44.41%
Total votes		27,293	100.0%

West Virginia House District 44 election, 2012
Party	Candidate	Votes	%
Democratic	Dana Lynch	3,351	59.94%
Republican	Robert L. Karnes	2,240	40.06%
Total votes		5,591	100.0%

== Controversies ==
During the 2018–2019 teachers' strikes, Karnes stated he believed that the strikes "[wouldn't] have any significant effect."

In 2021, during the COVID-19 pandemic, Karnes wore a mesh mask to protest the West Virginian state-level mask mandate and Centers for Disease Control and Prevention guidelines by conducting official duties without a proper face covering.

Karnes was the only senator to vote against the Film Tax Credit, noting it would benefit Bette Midler more than West Virginia residents. It afforded him headlines via national news media.
