= Randy White (West Virginia politician) =

American politician

Member of the West Virginia Senate from the 11th district
- In office December 1, 2002 – December 1, 2010
- Succeeded by: Gregory Tucker

Personal details
- Born: May 10, 1955 (age 71) Charleston, West Virginia
- Party: Democratic
- Spouse: Deborah
- Education: West Virginia University
- Occupation: Business manager

Clark Randolph "Randy" White is a former Democratic member of the West Virginia Senate, representing the 11th district from 2002 to 2011. Earlier he was a member of the West Virginia House of Delegates from 1996 through 2002. White lost the Democratic Primary to Gregory Tucker.
