= 2012 United States Senate election in West Virginia =

- November 6, 2012
- Turnout: 46.3% (voting eligible)
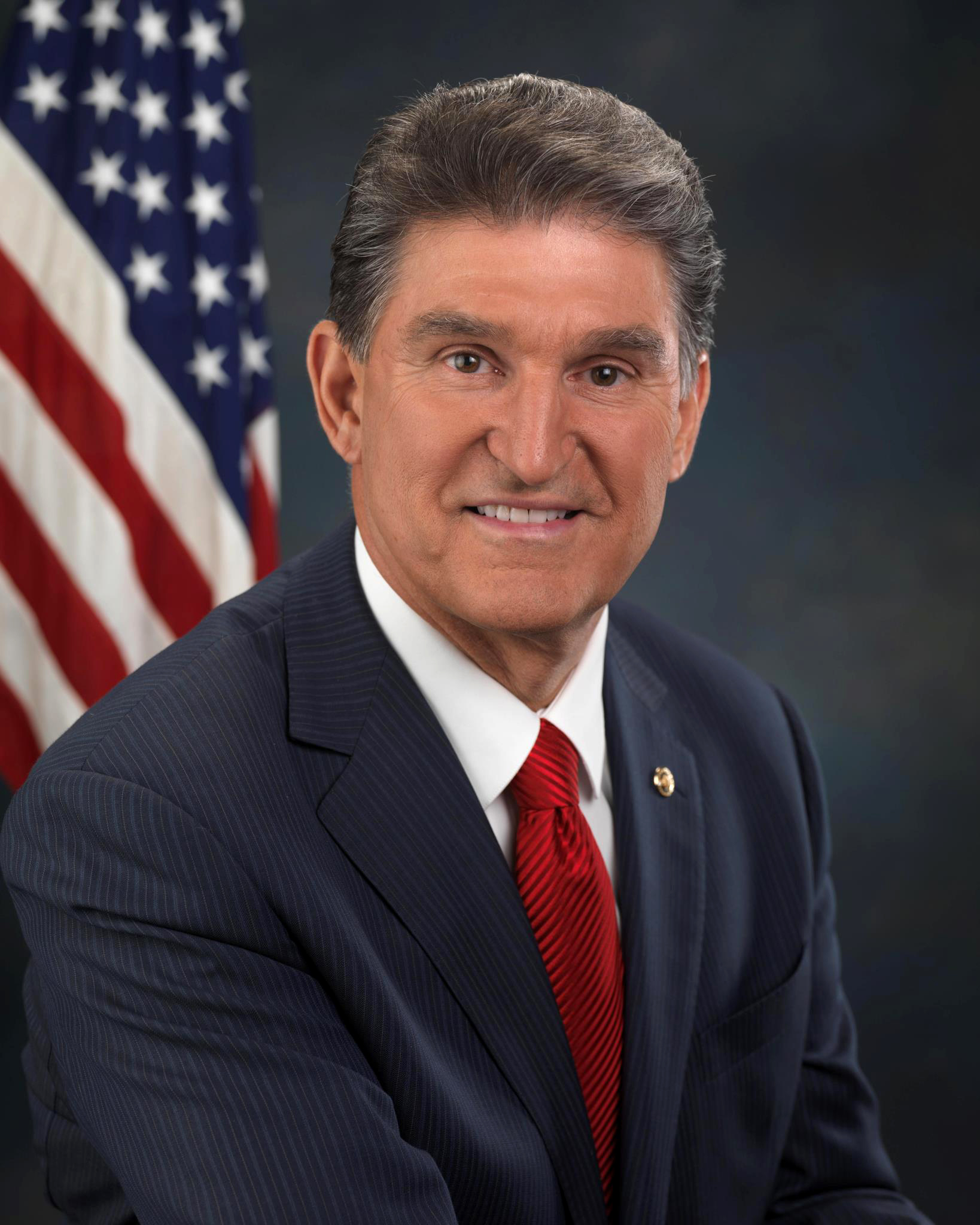

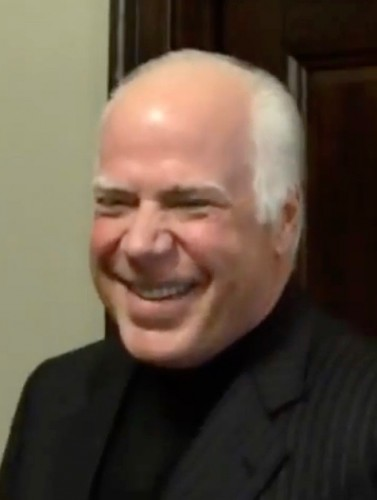
Nominee	Joe Manchin	John Raese
Party	Democratic	Republican
Popular vote	399,908	240,787
Percentage	60.57%	36.47%
- Manchin: 40–50% 50–60% 60–70% 70–80% Raese: 50–60% 60–70%
U.S. senator before election
Joe Manchin
Democratic
Elected U.S. Senator
Joe Manchin
Democratic

The 2012 United States Senate election in West Virginia was held on November 6, 2012, to elect one of West Virginia's two members of the U.S. Senate for a six-year term. In a rematch of the 2010 special election, incumbent Democratic U.S. Senator Joe Manchin won re-election to a first full term against the Republican nominee, John Raese. Notably, Manchin outperformed Barack Obama in the concurrent presidential election by 25.06 percentage points in vote share, and by 50.86 percentage points on margin. Manchin also won all but three counties, including 10 that he lost in 2010.

== Background ==
Robert Byrd held this seat in the U.S. Senate from 1959 until his death on June 28, 2010, after serving in the U.S. House of Representatives since 1953, making him the longest-serving person in Congress. Byrd led his party in the Senate from 1977 to 1989, as majority leader or minority leader. Afterward, as the most senior Democrat in the Senate, he served as president pro tempore of the Senate whenever his party was in the majority, including at the time of his death.

After Byrd's death, West Virginia Secretary of State Natalie Tennant initially announced that a special election would not be held until the regular election for the six-year term in 2012. However, that special election was rescheduled to 2010 for it to coincide with the mid-term elections and to avoid having an interim appointee serving more than two years in the seat.

Governor Joe Manchin made a temporary appointment of Carte Goodwin to the vacant seat. Goodwin was later replaced by Manchin, who won the 2010 special election.

== Democratic primary ==
=== Candidates ===
- Sheirl Fletcher, former Republican state delegate and Democratic candidate for the U.S. Senate in 2008 and 2010
- Joe Manchin, incumbent U.S. senator

=== Results ===
Democratic primary results
Party	Candidate	Votes	%
Democratic	Joe Manchin (incumbent)	163,891	79.94
Democratic	Sheirl Fletcher	41,118	20.06
Total votes		205,009	100

== Republican primary ==
- John Raese, perennial candidate

Republican primary results
Party	Candidate	Votes	%
Republican	John Raese	88,510	100.0
Total votes		88,510	100

== General election ==
=== Candidates ===
- Bob Henry Baber (Mountain), former mayor of Richwood and candidate for governor in 2011
- Joe Manchin (Democratic), incumbent U.S. senator
- John Raese (Republican), businessman and perennial candidate

=== Campaign ===
Raese filed a rematch against Manchin, arguing that he now had more material to criticize Manchin with, including that Manchin lost his longtime endorsement from the organization West Virginians for Life because of his vote against defunding Planned Parenthood, the nation's largest abortion provider. He also mentioned that Manchin was undecided about whether to support Obama's re-election campaign. Senior Obama campaign advisor David Axelrod commented in response, "His concern is about his own political well-being." In addition, he voted against U.S. Congressman Paul Ryan's Republican budget.

Raese wrote an op-ed in the Charleston Gazette-Mail, saying about Manchin, "Yes, he'll talk like a conservative and act like he's fiscally responsible to appeal to more moderate voters, but under that outward appearance of a lovable rube is the heart of a tax-and-spend liberal."

Raese continued to make controversial statements. In April 2012, he equated smoking bans with Adolf Hitler's yellow badge. He said, "in Monongalia County now, I have to put a huge sticker on my buildings to say this is a smoke-free environment. This is brought to you by the government of Monongalia County. Okay? Remember Hitler used to put Star of David on everybody’s lapel, remember that? Same thing." That same day, he referred to President Franklin D. Roosevelt as "Fidel Roosevelt." Raese didn't apologize for his statements on Hitler saying "I am not going to be intimidated by a bunch of bullshit. I'm not apologizing to anybody or any organization. It's my perfect right to make a speech about meaningful subject matters in this country." He also called rocker Ted Nugent a "patriot" for criticizing President Barack Obama.

=== Fundraising ===
Candidate (party)	Receipts	Disbursements	Cash on hand	Debt
Joe Manchin (D)	$9,467,003	$7,678,708	$1,788,297	$0
John Raese (R)	$1,607,740	$1,610,493	$4,679	$0
Source: Federal Election Commission

==== Top contributors ====
Joe Manchin	Contribution	John Raese	Contribution
Lawyers/law firms	$670,553	Entertainment industry	$176,025
Mining industry	$647,548	Leadership PACs	$143,190
Electric utilities	$392,100	Retired	$109,513
Leadership PACs	$366,000	Lawyers/law firms	$62,069
Health professionals	$287,498	Special trade contractors	$59,450
Retired	$275,750	Health professionals	$54,300
Pharmaceuticals/health products	$272,900	Financial institutions	$52,695
Petroleum industry	$256,150	Real estate	$45,875
Real estate	$228,350	Petroleum industry	$35,900
Lobbyists	$200,689	Republican/Conservative	$35,357
Source: OpenSecrets

==== Top industries ====
Joe Manchin	Contribution	John Raese	Contribution
FirstEnergy Corporation	$136,950	Greer Industries	$124,754
Mylan Laboratories Inc.	$127,500	Mountaineer Contractors Inc.	$40,900
Mepco LLC	$64,400	Senate Conservatives Fund	$37,690
Dominion Resources	$58,900	Frankovitch, Anetakis, Colantonio & Simon	$25,650
Centene Corporation	$55,900	Wv Radio	$22,550
American Electric Power	$55,750	West Virginia Radio Corporation	$16,821
Jackson Kelly PLLC	$50,825	Polino Contracting	$15,500
Drummond Company	$49,100	Cleveland Brothers	$10,800
Patriot Coal Corporation	$48,400	American Financial Group	$10,200
Boich Companies	$44,200	Senate Majority Fund	$10,000
Source: OpenSecrets

=== Predictions ===
Source	Ranking	As of
The Cook Political Report	Likely D	November 1, 2012
Sabato's Crystal Ball	Safe D	November 5, 2012
Rothenberg Political Report	Safe D	November 2, 2012
Real Clear Politics	Likely D	November 5, 2012

=== Polling ===
Poll source	Date(s) administered	Sample size	Margin of error	Joe Manchin (D)	John Raese (R)	Other	Undecided
Public Policy Polling	January 20–23, 2011	1,105	±2.9%	60%	31%	—	9%
Public Policy Polling	April 21–24, 2011	850	±3.4%	61%	29%	—	10%
Public Policy Polling	September 1–4, 2011	708	±3.7%	62%	23%	—	14%
R.L. Repass	April 25–28, 2012	410	±4.8%	74%	22%	—	4%
R.L. Repass	August 22–25, 2012	401	±4.9%	66%	27%	—	7%

Hypothetical polling

Poll source	Date(s) administered	Sample size	Margin of error	Joe Manchin (D)	Bill Maloney (R)	Other	Undecided
Public Policy Polling	September 30 – October 2, 2011	932	±3.2%	60%	29%	—	11%

Poll source	Date(s) administered	Sample size	Margin of error	Joe Manchin (D)	David McKinley (R)	Other	Undecided
Public Policy Polling	January 9–10, 2011	1,058	±	53%	41%	—	3%
Public Policy Polling	April 21–24, 2011	850	±3.4%	63%	25%	—	12%
Public Policy Polling	September 1–4, 2011	708	±3.7%	60%	24%	—	16%

Poll source	Date(s) administered	Sample size	Margin of error	Joe Manchin (D)	Shelley Moore Capito (R)	Other	Undecided
Public Policy Polling	January 20–23, 2011	1,105	±2.9%	50%	41%	—	10%
Public Policy Polling	April 21–24, 2011	850	±3.4%	48%	40%	—	12%
Public Policy Polling	September 1–4, 2011	708	±3.7%	52%	36%	—	13%
Public Policy Polling	September 30 – October 2, 2011	932	±3.2%	49%	38%	—	13%

=== Results ===
United States Senate election in West Virginia, 2012
Party	Candidate	Votes	%	±%
Democratic	Joe Manchin (incumbent)	399,908	60.57%	+7.10%
Republican	John Raese	240,787	36.47%	−6.93%
Mountain	Bob Henry Baber	19,517	2.96%	+1.04%
Total votes		660,212	100.00%	N/A
Democratic hold				

==== By county ====
In spite of the Republicans winning every county in the presidential election, Manchin carried 52 of West Virginia's 55 counties.

County	Joe Manchin Democratic		John Raese Republican		Bob Baber Mountain		Margin		Total
County	#	%	#	%	#	%	#	%	Total
Barbour	3,358	58.8%	2,199	38.5%	151	2.6%	1,159	20.3%	5,708
Berkeley	19,306	53.3%	16,046	44.3%	854	2.4%	3,260	9.0%	36,206
Boone	5,955	69.9%	2,318	27.2%	241	2.8%	3,637	42.7%	8,514
Braxton	3,160	68.9%	1,297	28.3%	132	2.9%	1,863	40.6%	4,589
Brooke	6,441	71.0%	2,479	27.3%	154	1.7%	3,962	43.7%	9,074
Cabell	22,007	68.7%	9,133	28.5%	881	2.8%	12,874	40.2%	32,021
Calhoun	1,360	62.6%	695	32.0%	117	5.4%	665	30.6%	2,172
Clay	1,893	62.7%	993	32.9%	132	4.4%	900	29.8%	3,018
Doddridge	1,142	41.9%	1,489	54.6%	95	3.5%	-347	-12.7%	2,726
Fayette	8,764	63.1%	4,524	32.6%	609	4.4%	4,240	30.5%	13,897
Gilmer	14,09	55.7%	881	34.8%	238	9.4%	528	20.9%	2,528
Grant	1,473	32.7%	2,955	65.6%	79	1.8%	-1,482	-32.9%	4,507
Greenbrier	7,952	62.9%	4,112	32.5%	582	4.6%	3,840	30.4%	12,646
Hampshire	3,955	49.9%	3,761	47.5%	202	2.6%	194	2.4%	7,918
Hancock	7,920	67.5%	3,628	30.9%	186	1.6%	4,292	36.6%	11,734
Hardy	2,763	54.6%	2,170	42.9%	124	2.5%	593	11.7%	5,057
Harrison	15,009	57.3%	10,452	39.9%	743	2.8%	4,557	17.4%	26,204
Jackson	7,039	61.9%	4,092	36.0%	246	2.2%	2,947	25.9%	11,377
Jefferson	12,338	56.6%	8,619	39.5%	841	3.9%	3,719	17.1%	21,798
Kanawha	46,255	62.3%	24,837	33.5%	3,127	4.2%	21,418	28.8%	74,219
Lewis	3,455	54.3%	2,673	42.0%	232	3.6%	782	12.3%	6,360
Lincoln	4,504	66.8%	2,059	30.6%	175	2.6%	2,445	36.2%	6,738
Logan	8,642	74.6%	2,768	23.9%	169	1.5%	5,874	50.7%	11,579
Marion	13,606	63.8%	7,101	33.3%	607	2.8%	6,505	30.5%	21,314
Marshall	8,270	65.0%	4,167	32.8%	285	2.2%	4,103	32.2%	12,722
Mason	6,771	70.4%	2,669	27.8%	176	1.8%	4,102	42.6%	9,616
McDowell	4,385	72.3%	1,550	25.6%	129	2.1%	2,835	46.7%	6,064
Mercer	12,243	59.6%	7,898	38.4%	414	2.0%	4,345	21.2%	20,555
Mineral	5,623	51.4%	5,142	47.0%	183	1.7%	481	4.4%	10,948
Mingo	6,336	72.8%	2,216	25.5%	148	1.7%	4,120	47.3%	8,700
Monongalia	15,896	51.5%	13,563	43.9%	1,424	4.6%	2,333	7.6%	30,883
Monroe	2,997	58.7%	1,958	38.4%	149	2.9%	1,039	20.3%	5,104
Morgan	3,417	51.0%	3,071	45.8%	210	3.1%	346	5.2%	6,698
Nicholas	5,440	61.5%	3,036	34.3%	372	4.2%	2,404	27.2%	8,848
Ohio	11,210	63.7%	5,976	34.0%	415	2.4%	5,234	29.7%	17,601
Pendleton	1,670	51.4%	1,500	46.2%	79	2.4%	170	5.2%	3,249
Pleasants	1,779	63.6%	961	34.4%	56	2.0%	818	29.2%	2,796
Pocahontas	2,092	60.2%	1,141	32.8%	241	6.9%	951	27.4%	3,474
Preston	4,159	38.2%	6,325	58.2%	392	3.6%	-2,166	-20.0%	10,876
Putnam	13,509	57.6%	9,379	40.0%	583	2.5%	4,130	17.6%	23,471
Raleigh	16,748	59.4%	10,791	38.3%	638	2.3%	5,957	21.1%	28,177
Randolph	5,979	62.2%	3,310	34.4%	323	3.4%	2,669	27.8%	9,612
Ritchie	1,969	52.3%	1,696	45.1%	98	2.6%	273	7.2%	3,763
Roane	3,205	64.2%	1,595	32.0%	189	3.8%	1,610	32.2%	4,989
Summers	3,028	65.3%	1,452	31.3%	158	3.4%	1,576	34.0%	4,638
Taylor	3,353	56.7%	2,422	40.9%	142	2.4%	931	15.8%	5,917
Tucker	1,780	56.2%	1,302	41.1%	84	2.7%	478	15.1%	3,166
Tyler	1,803	56.0%	1,342	41.7%	76	2.4%	461	14.3%	3,221
Upshur	4,403	53.9%	3,531	43.2%	236	2.9%	872	10.7%	8,170
Wayne	9,580	69.3%	4,023	29.1%	230	1.7%	5,557	40.2%	13,833
Webster	1,740	62.5%	888	31.9%	154	5.5%	852	30.6%	2,782
Wetzel	3,866	66.8%	1,784	30.8%	135	2.3%	2,082	38.0%	5,785
Wirt	1,401	65.3%	683	31.9%	60	2.8%	718	33.4%	2,144
Wood	20,891	63.1%	11,583	35.0%	638	1.9%	9,308	28.1%	33,112
Wyoming	4,649	63.0%	2,552	34.6%	183	2.5%	2,097	28.4%	7,384
Totals	399,908	60.6%	240,787	36.5%	19,517	3.0%	159,152	24.1%	660,212

Counties that flipped from Republican to Democratic

- Berkeley (largest municipality: Martinsburg)
- Hampshire (largest municipality: Romney)
- Morgan (largest municipality: Berkeley Springs)
- Hardy (largest municipality: Moorefield)
- Mineral (largest municipality: Keyser)
- Ritchie (largest municipality: Harrisville)
- Pendleton (largest municipality: Franklin)
- Tyler (largest municipality: Paden City)
- Upshur (largest municipality: Buckhannon)
- Putnam (largest municipality: Hurricane)

==== By congressional district ====
Manchin won all three congressional districts, including two held by Republicans.

District	Manchin	Raese	Representative
1st	58.31%	38.94%	David McKinley
2nd	58.48%	38.2%	Shelley Moore Capito
3rd	65.42%	31.82%	Nick Rahall

== See also ==
- 2012 United States Senate elections
- 2012 United States House of Representatives elections in West Virginia
- 2012 United States presidential election in West Virginia
- 2012 West Virginia gubernatorial election
