= Bill Hamilton (West Virginia politician) =

American politician (born 1950)

Member of the West Virginia Senate from the 11th district
- Incumbent
- Assumed office December 1, 2018 Serving with Robbie Morris
- Preceded by: Robert L. Karnes

Member of the West Virginia House of Delegates from the 45th district
- In office January 12, 2013 – December 1, 2018
- Preceded by: Larry Williams
- Succeeded by: Carl Martin

Member of the West Virginia House of Delegates from the 39th district
- In office January 2003 – January 2013
- Preceded by: Dale Riggs
- Succeeded by: Ron Walters

Personal details
- Born: July 14, 1950 (age 76) Buckhannon, West Virginia, U.S.
- Party: Republican
- Education: Potomac State College

William David Hamilton (born July 14, 1950) is an American politician. He is a member of the West Virginia Senate from the 11th district. He was a member of the West Virginia House of Delegates representing District 45 from January 12, 2013 to December 1, 2018. Hamilton served consecutively from January 2003 until January 2013 in the District 39 seat.

== Personal life ==
Hamilton graduated from Buckhannon-Upshur High School and attended Potomac State College. He formerly worked as an insurance agent at Loudin Insurance Agency.

== Political career ==
In 2000, Hamilton ran in the Republican primary for the 39th district of the West Virginia House of Delegates. He was defeated by the incumbent Dale F. Riggs. In 2002, Hamilton ran against Riggs again. He was endorsed by the state chapters of the United Mine Workers and the AFL-CIO, and won with 55% of the vote. Hamilton was unopposed in the general election.

In 2018, Hamilton challenged Robert L. Karnes for his seat in the West Virginia Senate. Karnes opposed unions, supported Right-to-work laws, and stated that teachers' strike earlier in the year "[held] kids hostage". Hamilton defeated Karnes in the primary, with much of his campaign contributions coming from organized labor.

== Elections ==
West Virginia Senate District 11 (Position A) election, 2018
Party	Candidate	Votes	%
Republican	Bill Hamilton	23,718	70.44%
Democratic	Laura M. Finch	9,953	29.56%
Total votes		33,671	100%

- 2012 Redistricted to District 45, and with District 45 incumbent Larry Williams redistricted to District 52, Hamilton was unopposed for both the May 8, 2012 Republican Primary, winning with 2,490 votes, and the November 6, 2012 General election, winning with 5,669 votes.
- 2000 Hamilton challenged District 39 incumbent Representative Dale Riggs in the 2000 Republican Primary but lost to Representative Riggs, who was re-elected in the November 7, 2000 General election.
- 2002 Hamilton challenged Representative Riggs again in the 2002 Republican Primary and won, and was unopposed for the November 5, 2002 General election.
- 2004 Hamilton was unopposed for the 2004 Republican Primary and won the November 2, 2004 General election against Democratic nominee Teresa Khan.
- 2006 Hamilton was unopposed for the 2006 Republican Primary and won the November 7, 2006 General election against Democratic nominee Ryan Thorn.
- 2008 Hamilton was challenged in the May 13, 2008 Republican Primary but won with 2,233 votes (80.9%), and was unopposed for the November 4, 2008 General election, winning with 6,285 votes.
- 2010 Hamilton was challenged in the three-way May 11, 2010 Republican Primary but won with 1,386 votes (62.9%), and was unopposed for the November 2, 2010 General election, winning with 4,765 votes.
