= John Pitsenbarger =

American politician and farmer

John R. Pitsenbarger

Member of the West Virginia Senate from the 11th district
- In office October 17, 2019 – December 1, 2020
- Preceded by: Greg Boso
- Succeeded by: Robert L. Karnes

Personal details
- Party: Republican
- Spouse: Tanya
- Profession: Farmer

John R. Pitsenbarger is an American politician and farmer from West Virginia. A Republican, Pitsenbarger represented the 11th district of the West Virginia Senate from 2019 to 2020.

Pitsenbarger operates a farm in Nicholas County, where he lives with his wife. He is currently the vice president of the West Virginia Farm Bureau, and a field enumerator for the U.S. Department of Agriculture's National Agricultural Statistics Service in Charleston.
