= Greg Boso =

American politician

Member of the West Virginia Senate from the 11th district
- In office January 16, 2015 – September 26, 2019
- Preceded by: Clark Barnes
- Succeeded by: John Pitsenbarger

Personal details
- Born: October 8, 1957 (age 68) Gassaway, West Virginia, U.S.
- Party: Republican
- Education: West Virginia University Institute of Technology (B.S.)
- Profession: Civil engineer

Gregory L. Boso is a former Republican member of the West Virginia Senate who represented the 11th district from January 16, 2015, until his resignation on September 26, 2019, after accepting a job with a forensic engineering firm.

== Election results ==
West Virginia Senate District 11 (Position B) election, 2016
Party	Candidate	Votes	%
Republican	Greg Boso (incumbent)	20,610	49.39%
Democratic	Denise Campbell	19,718	47.25%
Mountain	Bruce Zeno Breuninger	1,404	3.36%
Total votes		41,732	100.0%
