= 2006 United States Senate election in West Virginia =

- November 7, 2006
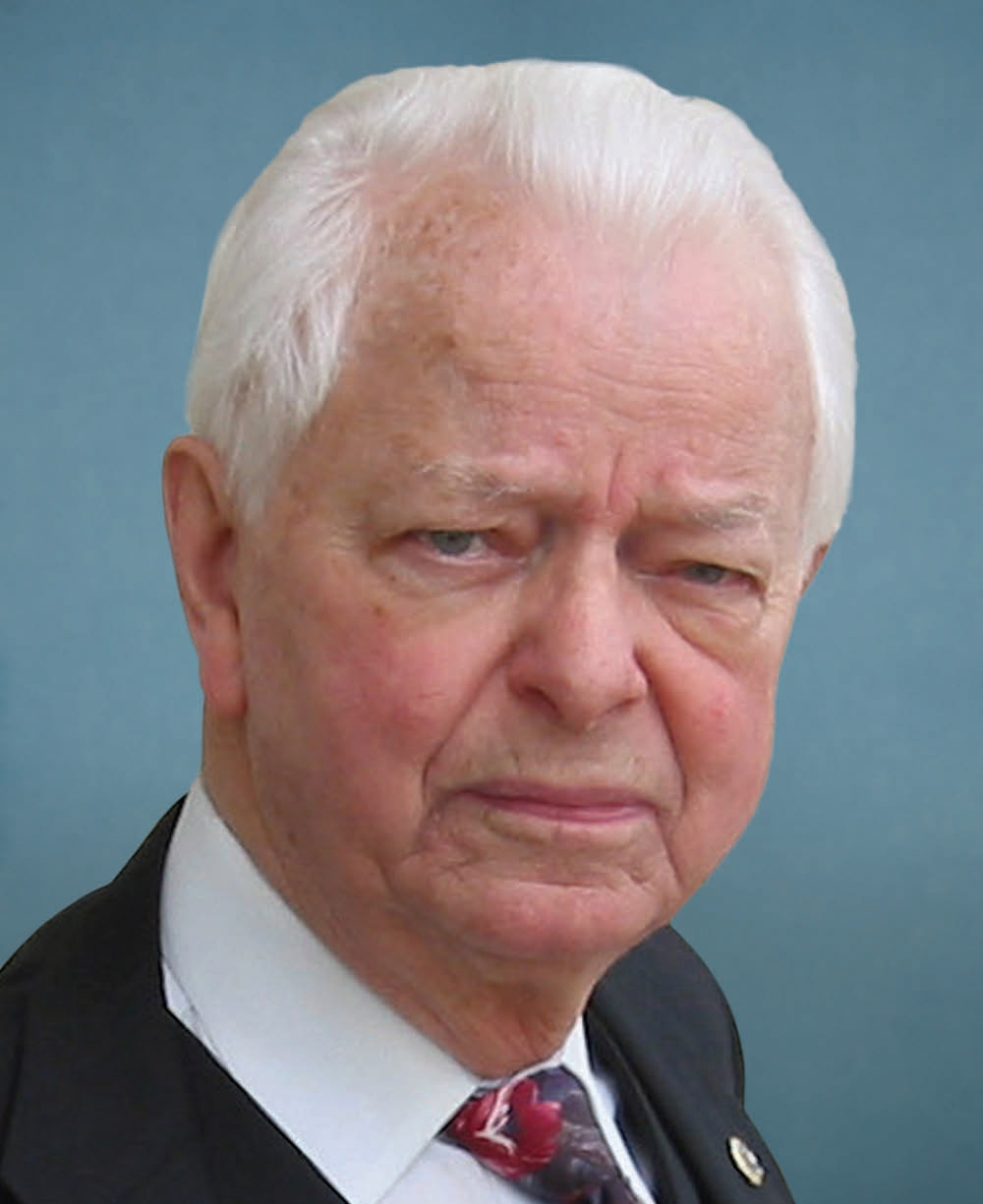

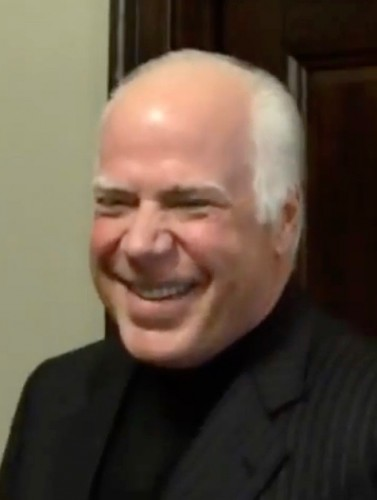
Nominee	Robert Byrd	John Raese
Party	Democratic	Republican
Popular vote	296,276	155,043
Percentage	64.42%	33.71%
- County results Byrd: 40–50% 50–60% 60–70% 70–80% 80–90% Raese: 50–60%
U.S. senator before election
Robert Byrd
Democratic
Elected U.S. Senator
Robert Byrd
Democratic

The 2006 United States Senate election in West Virginia was held November 7, 2006. Incumbent Democrat Robert Byrd won re-election to a ninth term. He was sworn in on January 3, 2007. However, he died in office on June 28, 2010, before the end of his term.

This was one of five Democratic-held Senate seats up for election in a state that George W. Bush won in the 2004 presidential election.

== Background ==
Before the 2000 presidential election, West Virginia had been won by the Democratic nominee every time starting in 1932 (except for the Republican landslides of 1956, 1972, and 1984). In 2000, then Republican governor George W. Bush of Texas won West Virginia’s five electoral college votes over then Vice President Al Gore of Tennessee by a margin of 52–46. Also in the 2000 election, Republican Shelley Moore Capito, the daughter of Former West Virginia Governor Arch A. Moore, Jr., won a surprise victory over Democrat Jim Humphreys for West Virginia's 2nd Congressional District seat to the United States House of Representatives. She would become the first Republican in West Virginia to hold a Congressional office for more than one term since her father in 1969. Before these two major victories for national and West Virginia Republicans, it was difficult to find a Republican who could mount a formidable campaign against Democrats running for public office in West Virginia.

President Bush won West Virginia again in the 2004 presidential election over John F. Kerry, the Democratic junior Senator from Massachusetts by a margin of 56–43. Both Representative Alan Mollohan (D-1st District) and Representative Nick Rahall (D-3rd District) had more formidable challenges from Republicans when compared to 2000 and 2002. Republican Brent Benjamin defeated Democratic incumbent West Virginia Supreme Court of Appeals Justice Warren McGraw, and Republican Betty Ireland defeated liberal-Democrat Ken Hechler, a former congressman and secretary of state, for West Virginia Secretary of State.

Since 2000, the Republicans have gained seven net seats in both the West Virginia Senate and the West Virginia House of Delegates. However, the Democrats hold 60% of the seats in the Senate and 68% of the seats in the House.

Along with continued majorities in the legislature, Democrats have also had some other victories. Even though both Bush and Capito won their respective offices in 2000, Senator Byrd sailed to an eighth term with 78% of the vote over Republican David Gallaher. Senator John D. Rockefeller, IV, easily won a fourth term to the Senate in 2002 by a margin of 63–37 over Republican Jay Wolfe. In 2000, 2002, and 2004, both Representative Mollohan and Representative Rahall were re-elected by much stronger margins than Capito. In 2004, Republican Monty Warner failed to defeat Democratic West Virginia Secretary of State Joe Manchin for governor.

After the Republicans failed to win the governor’s race, West Virginia Republican Committee Chairman Kris Warner, the brother of Monty, was put under pressure to resign his post; he did so in May 2005. Wheeling attorney Rob Capehart took his place. (Dr. Doug McKinney of Bridgeport now holds the post.) Another brother of Monty, Kasey, who was appointed by President Bush in 2001, was removed as the United States Attorney for the Southern District of West Virginia on August 1, 2005. No explanation has been given for his departure and First Assistant U.S. Attorney Charles T. Miller currently represents the district.

== Democratic primary ==
=== Candidates ===
Two Democrats filed for the primary on May 9, 2006:

- Robert Byrd, (D-Raleigh), Incumbent U.S. senator
- Billy Hendricks, Jr., (D-Boone), auto worker

=== Results ===
2006 West Virginia United States Senate Election Democratic Primary
Party	Candidate	Votes	%	±%
Democratic	Robert Byrd (incumbent)	159,154	85.7%	
Democratic	Billy Hendricks, Jr.	26,609	14.3%	

== Republican primary ==
=== Recruiting ===
Shelley Moore Capito: Both state and national Republicans chose Capito as their first choice to challenge Byrd. Early polling showed Byrd with only around a ten-point lead. Capito had even met with National Republican Senatorial Committee (NRSC) Chairwoman Elizabeth Dole, whose husband, Robert Dole, served alongside Byrd as majority and minority leader in the Senate, to discuss a possible run. Despite party leaders pushing for her to run, on October 3, 2005, Capito announced she would seek a fourth term for her congressional seat rather than run against Byrd. She cited the negativity of a possible Byrd-Capito race as a reason for not running. Other reasons for Capito not running include the following: Capito's seat is widely considered safe; Capito is rising in House leadership; if Capito ran against Byrd, her seat could possibly have fallen back into the Democratic column; and Capito's large amount of contributions from former House Majority Leader Tom DeLay could be brought into question.

Betty Ireland: After Capito decided not to run, Republicans hoped to recruit Secretary of State Ireland, the first woman elected to the executive branch of West Virginia. On October 27, 2005, however, Ireland announced she would not run against the eight-term senator. She said that the office of Secretary of State should not be used as a political stepping stone. Ironically, Joe Manchin held the office of Secretary of State during his campaign for governor.

Gale Catlett: Conservative columnist Robert Novak wrote in a September 24, 2005, article that Gale Catlett's, the former head coach of the West Virginia University Men's Basketball team, name had been floated around as a possible challenger to Byrd. Catlett had in fact talked to West Virginia Republican Committee Chairman Capehart about either running against Byrd or possibly Representative Mollohan. It was also reported that if Capito had run against Byrd, Catlett would seek her seat. However, on November 11, 2005, Catlett decided not to run against Senator Byrd or Representative Mollohan. (A side note: On November 12, 2005, Ohio County Delegate Chris Wakim (R) announced his intentions to run against Representative Mollohan.)

Capehart: Also mentioned as a possible challenger was Chairman Capehart. Capehart told West Virginia Media Holding’s State Journal on December 5, 2005, that he would not seek the seat. He said that he would remain as chairman to accomplish his main goal: To completely erase the party's $200,000 debt which was left over after the 2004 election cycle.

John Raese: On January 11, 2006, TheHill.com reported that NRSC Chairwoman Dole met with 1984 Republican United States Senate candidate and 1988 Republican Gubernatorial primary-candidate Raese to discuss a possible run for the nomination in May. Raese did file for the primary by the deadline of January 28, 2006.

=== Candidates ===
Six Republicans filed for the primary on May 9, 2006:

- Paul J. Brown, activist
- Zane Lawhorn, optician and author
- Hiram Lewis, member of the West Virginia Army National Guard and a self-employed attorney
- Bud Railey, land-developer and unsuccessful governor candidate
- John Raese, owner of Greer Industries, West Virginia Newspaper Publishing Company (which publishes The Dominion Post), and West Virginia Radio Corporation
- Rick Snuffer, unsuccessful 2004 congressional candidate

=== Results ===
2006 West Virginia United States Senate Election Republican Primary
Party	Candidate	Votes	%	±%
Republican	John Raese	47,408	58.3%	
Republican	Hiram Lewis	18,496	22.7%	
Republican	Rick Snuffer	4,870	6.0%	
Republican	Charles G. "Bud" Railey	4,364	5.4%	
Republican	Paul J. Brown	3,464	4.3%	
Republican	Zane Lawhorn	2,723	3.3%	

== General election ==
=== Candidates ===
Three candidates appeared on the ballot for the general election on November 7, 2006:

- Robert Byrd (D), incumbent U.S. senator
- Jesse Johnson (M), filmmaker, actor, and theatrical producer
- John Raese (R), businessman

=== Campaign ===
Byrd was extremely popular as he had approval ratings in the low 60% range. Raese, a millionaire, self-financed his campaign. He spent campaign ads on attacking Byrd.

=== Predictions ===
Source	Ranking	As of
The Cook Political Report	Solid D	November 6, 2006
Sabato's Crystal Ball	Safe D	November 6, 2006
Rothenberg Political Report	Safe D	November 6, 2006
Real Clear Politics	Safe D	November 6, 2006

=== Polling ===
Source	Date	Robert Byrd (D)	John Raese (R)
Rasmussen	February 19, 2006	58%	32%
Rasmussen	April 25, 2006	57%	34%
RMS Strategies	May 22, 2006	59%	30%
Rasmussen	August 1, 2006	56%	31%
Rasmussen	September 5, 2006	63%	30%
Polimetrix	November 5, 2006	67%	33%

=== Results ===
2006 West Virginia United States Senate General Election
Party	Candidate	Votes	%	±%
Democratic	Robert Byrd (incumbent)	296,276	64.42%	−13.33%
Republican	John Raese	155,043	33.71%	+13.55%
Mountain	Jesse Johnson	8,565	1.86%	n/a
Majority		141,233	30.71%	−26.89%
Turnout		459,884	40.4%	−21.5
Democratic hold		Swing		

==== Counties that flipped from Democratic to Republican ====
- Doddridge (largest municipality: West Union)

== Analysis ==
Byrd defeated Raese and Johnson 64–34–2. Representative Mollohan defeated Delegate Wakim 64–36. Representative Capito defeated former West Virginia Democratic Party Chairman Mike Callaghan 57–43. Representative Rahall defeated Cabell County Sheriff Kim Wolfe 69–31.

Even though there was a two million dollar ad campaign by Massey Energy's CEO Don Blankenship against West Virginia House of Delegates and Senate Democrats, Democrats gained a net four seats in the House and two seats in the Senate. This resulted in a 72-28 Democrat advantage in the House and a 23-11 Democrat advantage in the Senate.

With the 2007 Democratic takeover of the United States Senate, Senator Byrd became the President pro tempore of the Senate (the third person in the presidential line of succession) as well as the chairman of the Senate Appropriations Committee.

== See also ==
- 2006 United States Senate elections
- 2006 United States House of Representatives elections
