= Robbie Morris (politician) =

American politician

Member of the West Virginia Senate from the 11th district
- Incumbent
- Assumed office December 1, 2024 Serving with Bill Hamilton
- Preceded by: Robert L. Karnes

Personal details
- Born: 1982–1983
- Party: Republican
- Spouse: Whitney
- Children: 2
- Education: West Virginia Wesleyan College

Robbie Morris (born 1982–1983) is an American politician serving as a Republican member of the West Virginia Senate for the 11th district. He is the vice chair of both the Senate Banking and Insurance Committee and the Senate Economic Development Committee. He graduated from West Virginia Wesleyan College with a Bachelor of Arts in 2005 and a Master of Business Administration in 2007. Morris has served as the executive director of the Randolph County Development Authority and West Virginia Wood Technology Center. Morris has also been the chairman of the West Virginia Broadband Enhancement Council.
