= Gregory Tucker =

American politician

Gregory A. Tucker

Member of the West Virginia Senate from the 11th district
- In office December 1, 2010 – December 1, 2014
- Preceded by: Randy White
- Succeeded by: Robert L. Karnes

Personal details
- Born: August 3, 1957 (age 69) Montgomery, West Virginia, U.S.
- Party: Democratic
- Spouse: Sharon Plymale
- Children: Sara E. Acree; Daniel Tucker
- Education: Capital University (J.D.)
- Profession: Lawyer

Gregory Alan Tucker (born August 3, 1957) is an American politician and a former Democratic member of the West Virginia Senate, having represented the 11th district from 2010 to 2014.

== Education ==
Tucker earned his BS from West Virginia University and his JD from Capital University Law School.

== Elections ==
- 2010 Tucker challenged District 11 incumbent Senator Randy White and won the May 11, 2010 Democratic Primary with 6,147 votes (55.6%), and won the three-way November 2, 2010 General election with 14,544 votes (54.4%) against Republican nominee Adam Milligan and Libertarian candidate Thomas Thacker.

2006 Tucker initially challenged District 11 incumbent Democratic Senator White in the three-way 2006 Democratic Primary but lost to Senator White, who was re-elected in the November 7, 2006 General election.
