= Clark Barnes =

American politician (born 1950)

Member of the West Virginia Senate
- In office December 1, 2012 – January 14, 2015
- Preceded by: William Laird IV
- Succeeded by: Greg Boso
- Constituency: 11th district
- In office December 1, 2004 – December 1, 2012
- Preceded by: Mike Ross
- Succeeded by: Craig Blair
- Constituency: 15th district

Personal details
- Born: August 6, 1950 (age 76) Portsmouth, Virginia, U.S.
- Party: Republican
- Spouse(s): Deborah Lynn Chewning Barnes, Debora Lynn Miller Barnes
- Children: Thadeus; Erickson; Elizabeth; Rachel
- Education: Davis & Elkins College (A.A.S.); West Virginia University (B.A.); Pensacola Christian College (M.A.)

Clark S. Barnes (born August 6, 1950) is a former member of the West Virginia Senate, representing District 15 as a Republican. Originally elected in 2004, Barnes was reelected to the Senate’s District 15 in 2008. He ran in the 2012 election for West Virginia State Senate, District 11. He resigned in January 2015 when elected to become Clerk of the Senate. Professionally, Sen. Barnes, a Board Certified Hearing Instrument Specialist, has been the director of Heritage Hearing Aid Centers with offices in West Virginia and Virginia, the president of both General Lee Properties, Inc., and Heritage Hills Development Corporation. He is a past national director of the National Board of Certification for Hearing Instrument Specialists and has served as president of the West Virginia Hearing Society. He is a U.S. Army veteran who served with the Corps of Engineers at Fort Belvoir, Virginia, US Army European HQ, Heidelberg, Germany, and as a nuclear, biological and chemical NCO with the US Army Reserve.

== Political career ==
Barnes was elected to the West Virginia State Senate in 2004, defeating then 12-year incumbent Mike Ross in a close race that concluded after two vote recounts. He became the first Republican senator to serve his home County of Randolph since 1929. In 2006, the junior Republican was selected to serve as minority whip in the senate. Barnes was reelected for a second term in 2008. There was no controversy in the race as Barnes defeated the same opponent, Ross, by several thousand votes.

Barnes served on the following committees: West Virginia State Legislature Economic Development Committee, West Virginia State Legislature Education Committee, West Virginia State Legislature Government Operations Committee, West Virginia State Legislature Judiciary Committee, West Virginia State Legislature Regional Jail and Correctional Facility Authority Committee, West Virginia State Senate Enrolled Bills Committee, West Virginia State Senate Labor Committee, West Virginia State Senate Natural Resources Committee, West Virginia State Senate Transportation and Infrastructure Committee.

In 2011, Barnes ran for Governor of West Virginia in a special election, placing third in the Republican primary.

Barnes ran in the 2012 election for West Virginia State Senate, District 11. Barnes ran unopposed in the May 8, 2012, primary election and was challenged by Margaret Kerr Beckwith in the general election, which took place on November 6, 2012.

== History ==
The son of a Baptist minister, Barnes spent his younger years in the Northview section of Clarksburg and is the grandson of Erna and Cora Barnes. His family later moved to Paden City, in the Ohio valley, where he graduated from Paden City High School. Barnes served as an enlisted soldier with the Army Corps of Engineers from 1973 to 1976, including an assignment as a chemical, biological, and nuclear non-commissioned officer.

Barnes attended Northern Virginia Community College before enrolling at Davis & Elkins College, located In Elkins, West Virginia. Barnes earned AAS in business administration from Davis & Elkins College. He then earned his BA while attending West Virginia University, located in Morgantown, West Virginia. Finally, Barnes earned his MA from Pensacola Christian College.

He married Deborah Chewning of Coalton, West Virginia, in 1972, and has four children: Thad, Erick, Elizabeth, and Rachel. He remarried in 2014 to the former Debora Miller of Buckhannon, West Virginia.
