= Saša Božović =

- Саша Божовић
- Born: Saša Magazinović; 4 August 1912; Belgrade, Kingdom of Serbia
- Died: 10 December 1995 (aged 83); Belgrade, Serbia, FR Yugoslavia

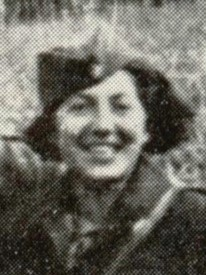
Saša Božović

Saša Božović (Serbian Cyrillic: Саша Божовић; 4 August 1912 – 10 December 1995) was a doctor, writer and participant in the antifascist resistance of the Yugoslav Partisans during World War II in Yugoslavia.

== Education ==
She graduated from the University of Belgrade Faculty of Medicine in 1937.

== Second World War ==
After the April 1941 German bombing of Belgrade in Operation Retribution she left the city while pregnant and moved to Podgorica in modern-day Montenegro. Since her husband was one of the main organizers of the 1941 Uprising in Montenegro, Italian forces imprisoned her and subsequently sent her to a concentration camp in the Albanian Kingdom.

She was later sent to a hospital in Tirana where she gave birth to her daughter Dolores, named after Dolores Ibárruri, republican heroine of the Spanish Civil War. She was liberated in exchange for Italian soldiers taken hostage by Partisan forces. Saša was working as an organizer of the Partisan war hospital. Her daughter Dolores, called "Little Partisan" by Sava Kovačević, died from consequences of low temperature, hunger and exhaustion on 7 March 1943 during the Battle of the Neretva. Her grave was in a village that after the war in 1953 ended up below the artificial Jablanica lake. After the Belgrade Offensive she became a military delegate at the Yugoslav Red Cross and in 1944 she became a member of the Communist Party of Yugoslavia. She was awarded the Commemorative Medal of the Partisans of 1941.

== Post-war ==
After the war, she had two sons and one daughter. In 1976, on Saša's birthday, her first granddaughter was born and the parents insisted that the child be called Dolores. Together with Darko Šilović she co-authored Tebi moja Dolores (For you, my Dolores), a work which was republished seven times and was the most read book in the Socialist Federal Republic of Yugoslavia in 1980.
