= Bonzo =

Bonzo may mean:

- Nickname of John Bonham, the drummer for Led Zeppelin
- Bonzo the dog, a fictional character that was created by British commercial artist George E. Studdy
- A chimpanzee - the title character in the 1951 comedy film Bedtime for Bonzo, also starring Ronald Reagan
  - A nickname for Ronald Reagan, based on the film and mentioned in a number of songs:
    - "Five Minutes" (Bonzo Goes to Washington song) by the band Bonzo Goes to Washington, which refers to a microphone test speech made by Reagan
    - "My Brain Is Hanging Upside Down (Bonzo Goes to Bitburg)" by The Ramones
    - "Bad Time for Bonzo" by The Damned (band)
- Bonzo Dog Band, sometimes referred to as The Bonzos
- Bonzo Madrid, a character in the Ender series
- Uncle Bonzo, a menacing figure from Puccini's Madama Butterfly
- Bonzo (Piedmont), a former municipality in Piedmont, Italy
