= Greer Industries =

Greer Industries is a privately held producer of limestone, steel and other products based in Morgantown, West Virginia in the United States. The company is currently led by John Raese, who is active in Republican politics.

The company's holdings include;

Greer Limestone, the largest producer of limestone in West Virginia.
Greer Lime Company based in Pendleton County, West Virginia.
Greer Steel Company which has facilities in Dover, Ohio, and Ferndale, Michigan
Greer Asphalt
West Virginia Newspaper Publishing Company which controls the Dominion Post in Morgantown.
West Virginia Radio Corporation which manages nineteen stations in West Virginia.
Seneca Caverns, a tourist resort near Riverton, West Virginia
Pikewood National Golf Club near Morgantown.
