= Bozó (dice game) =

Brazilian dice game

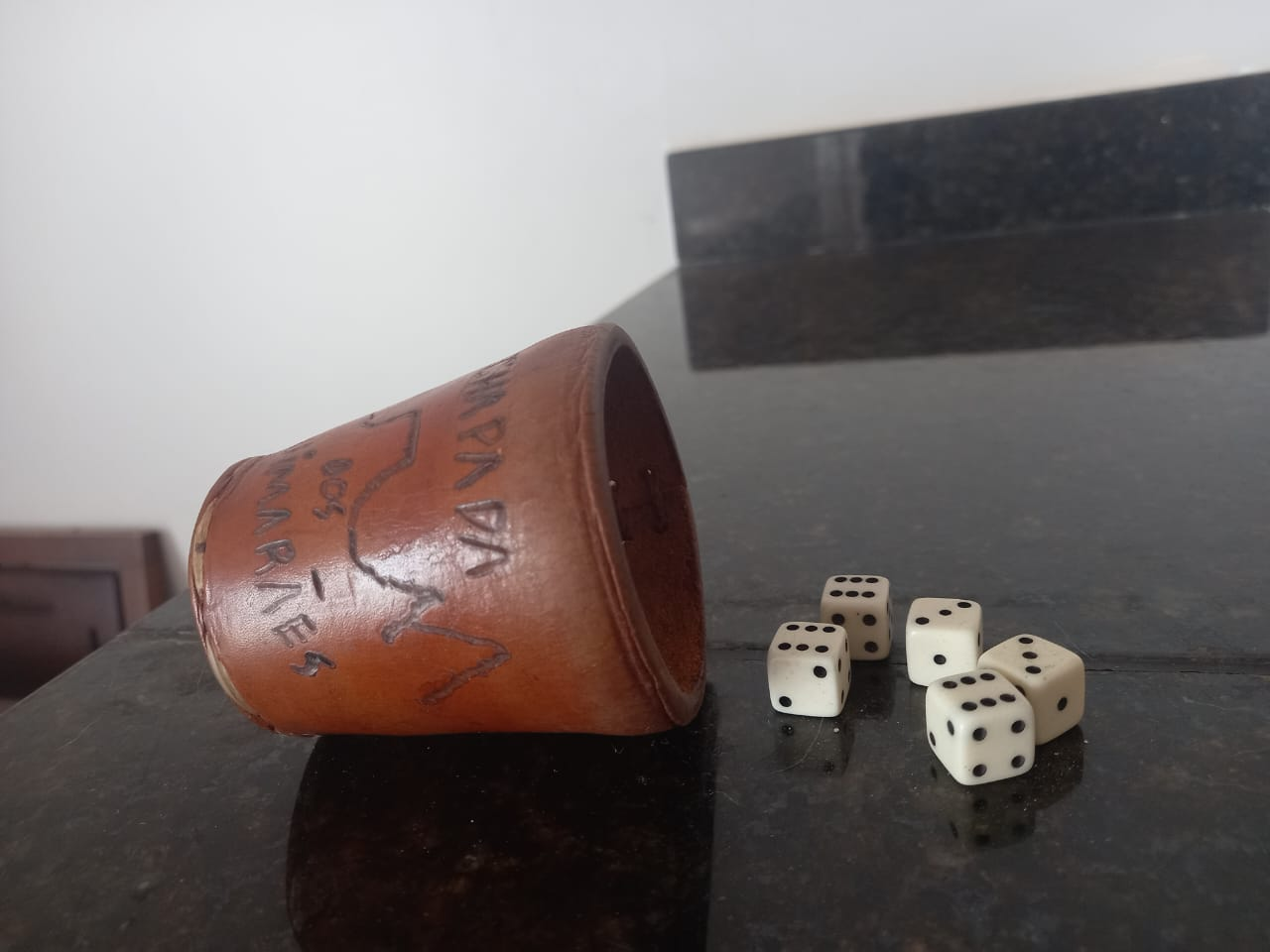
- Bozó game, Mato Grosso–themed
- Players: 2–6
- Skills: strategy; logical reasoning
- Age range: 8+

Related games
- Yahtzee

Bozó (Brazilian Portuguese pronunciation: [boˈzɔ]) is a Brazilian dice game played with five six-sided dice and a leather cup, in which players aim to achieve the highest score by forming specific combinations. It is closely related to Yahtzee.

The game is typically played by two to six players, who take turns rolling the dice up to three times per turn in order to obtain scoring combinations. Scores are recorded on a score sheet, and the player with the highest total at the end of the game wins. The game is played using a cup, dice, and a score sheet, and play proceeds in a clockwise direction. In some variations, players may compete individually or form pairs or trios.

== Origin ==
Bozó is a dice game of unknown origin that is popularly played in the Brazilian states of Mato Grosso and Mato Grosso do Sul.

== Rules ==
At the start of the game, the player places all the dice inside a cup, shakes it, and inverts it onto a flat surface, ensuring that none of the dice escape. Upon lifting the cup, the player must check whether any dice are stacked on top of one another; if this occurs, the dice are re-rolled until all are resting flat on the surface. Each player is allowed up to three rolls per turn. During these rolls, the player may choose to aim for the scoring combination that yields the highest number of points. The game comprises ten possible scoring categories. The winner is the player with the highest total score at the end of the game, calculated by summing all points obtained across the scoring categories.

=== Scoring ===
==== Number scoring ====
Combination	Description	Score	Example
Ás (Note: From Portuguese ás ("ace"), denoting the number one.)	Sum of dice showing 1	1–5	scores 3
Duque (Note: Portuguese for "duke"; denoting the number two.)	Sum of dice showing 2	2–10	scores 6
Terno (Note: From Portuguese terno ("set" or "group"); denoting the number three.)	Sum of dice showing 3	3–15	scores 9
Quadra (Note: From Portuguese quadra ("group of four"); denoting the number four.)	Sum of dice showing 4	4–20	scores 8
Quina (Note: From Portuguese quina ("group of five"); denoting the number five.)	Sum of dice showing 5	5–25	scores 15
Sena (Note: From Portuguese sena ("group of six"); denoting the number six.)	Sum of dice showing 6	6–30	scores 18

==== Combinations ====
Scoring rules for combinations may vary across regional or informal variants of the game.

Combination	Description	Score	Example
Fu (Note: Term of uncertain origin; used in Brazilian Portuguese to denote a specific dice combination.)	Full house (a pair and three of a kind)	20	2 3
Seguida (Note: From Portuguese seguida ("sequence" or "in succession").)	Consecutive sequence (1–2–3–4–5 or 2–3–4–5–6)	30	2 3 4 5 6
Quadrada (Note: From Portuguese quadrada ("square" or "fourfold"), referring to a grouping of four.)	Four of a kind	40	5 2
General (Note: Portuguese for "general"; used to denote the highest-ranking combination.)	Five of a kind	50	4

=== Special rules ===
- De boca (Note: Literally "from the mouth"; more idiomatically, "from the cup", referring to a result obtained immediately upon lifting the cup, without re-rolls.) refers to a combination achieved on the first roll, which may grant a bonus for certain combinations. It typically awards an additional 5 points.
- Baixo (Note: Literally “low” or “down”; refers to reversing the value of the dice (e.g., 6 becomes 1, 5 becomes 2, etc.).) is an optional rule that must be declared before lifting the cup. When applied, each die is counted as its opposite face value. The rule may only be declared after the first roll, and therefore can only be used on the second or third roll.
- Torar (Note: Term used in Brazilian Portuguese gameplay variants.) is a rule that allows a player to forfeit a scoring category instead of assigning a result to it. Once forfeited, the category can no longer be used for the remainder of the game.
