= Bozok =

Bozok may refer to:

- Bozoks, a tribe of Oghuz Turks
- Astana, founded as Bozok, Kazakhstan
- Bozok, Derik, a neighborhood of Derik, Turkey
- Yozgat Province, previously Bozok, Turkey
  - Yozgat, the seat of Yozgat Province
  - Yozgat Bozok University
- TÜBİTAK-SAGE BOZOK, Turkish rocket weapon

== Surname ==
- Umut Bozok (born 1996), Turkish footballer
- Salih Bozok, Turkish politician

== See also ==
- Božok
