= John Raese =

American businessman and perennial candidate

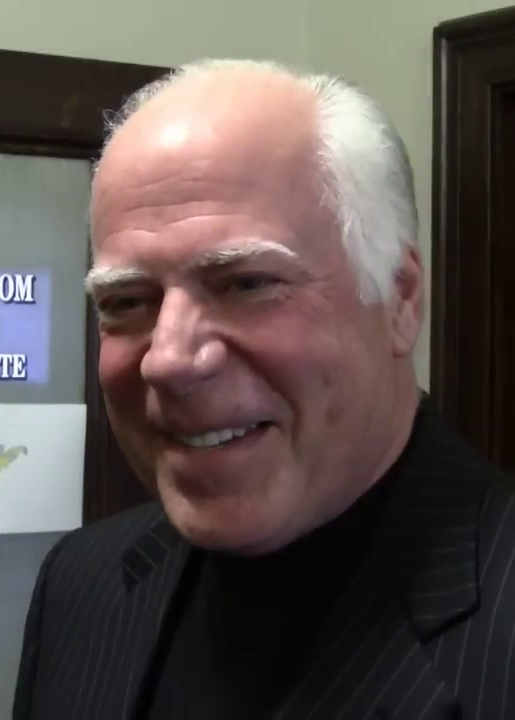
- Raese in 2012

Chair of the West Virginia Republican Party
- In office 1986–1987
- Preceded by: Kent Hall
- Succeeded by: Hike Heiskell

Personal details
- Born: John Reeves Raese; April 10, 1950 (age 76) Morgantown, West Virginia, U.S.
- Party: Republican
- Spouse: Liz
- Children: 2
- Education: West Virginia University (BS)
- Occupation: Businessman; perennial candidate

John Reeves Raese (/ˈreɪsiː/ RAY-see; born April 10, 1950) is an American businessman and perennial Republican Party candidate for political office in West Virginia. He lost campaigns to represent West Virginia in the United States Senate in 1984, 2006, 2010, and 2012. He was also defeated in the Republican primary in the election for Governor of West Virginia in 1988.

== Early life, education and career ==
Raese was born in Morgantown, West Virginia. He is the son of Jane Greer Raese and Richard Aubrey "Dyke" Raese, a former head basketball coach at West Virginia University (WVU).

Raese graduated from WVU with a Bachelor of Science degree in education in 1973. While attending West Virginia University he was a member of the West Virginia Beta chapter of Sigma Phi Epsilon. He is president and chief executive officer of Greer Industries, a steel and limestone producer. His business interests also include The Dominion Post (Morgantown), the West Virginia Radio Corporation, which owns 32 radio stations, and the MetroNews radio network serving 56 stations. Greer Industries also owns Seneca Caverns, a tourist spot in eastern West Virginia.

== Chairman of the West Virginia Republican Party ==
Raese was elected as chairman of the West Virginia Republican Party in the summer of 1986, defeating intraparty rival Arch A. Moore Jr.'s preferred candidate. During his tenure, he supported allowing independent voters in West Virginia to vote in Republican Party primaries. He joined with the West Virginia Federation of Young Republicans to promote "Initiative, Referendum, and Recall," debating the Democratic Speaker of the West Virginia House of Delegates, Chuck Chambers. He resigned from the position in 1987 in anticipation of a gubernatorial run the following year.

== Political positions ==
Raese supports eliminating the federal minimum wage, the Department of Education, Department of Energy and the Internal Revenue Service.

Raese opposes abortion, human cloning and federally funded stem cell research. He favors repealing the entire Patient Protection and Affordable Care Act of 2010 and supports the U.S. military's now-defunct Don't Ask Don't Tell policy.

== Political campaigns ==
=== 1984 U.S. Senate election ===
Raese ran for the U.S. Senate against two-term governor Jay Rockefeller, during a difficult economic downturn. Rockefeller outspent Raese tenfold, $12 million to $1.2 million. Raese ran as a "Reagan Republican", a traditional conservative on both economic and social policies, and he challenged Rockefeller's record on sensitive issues such as coal mine closures in the state. Some national news organizations were preparing for a possible upset by the little-known Raese as the general election approached. Raese narrowly lost to Rockefeller, 52%–48%; he challenged the outcome of the race, but without effect.

=== 1988 gubernatorial election ===
In 1988, Raese ran against three-term Republican governor Arch A. Moore Jr. in the GOP gubernatorial primary, losing 53%–47%. Moore later lost the general election to Gaston Caperton.

=== 2006 U.S. Senate election ===
In 2006 Raese ran against Robert Byrd, the longest-serving member of the U.S. Senate and former Senate Majority Leader and Senate Appropriations Chair.

Raese won the Republican nomination for U.S. Senate with 58 percent of the vote in a field of six candidates. In radio advertisements aired during the primary race, Raese's campaign replayed a tape of an endorsement from Ronald Reagan made during the 1984 Senate race.

In the general election, Republicans such as Senate Minority Leader Mitch McConnell of Kentucky stumped for Raese. Raese stressed the value of the private sector in creating jobs, and the importance of honoring traditional values. He also supported the anti-abortion movement, the right to bear arms, and tax cuts. During the election, the Byrd campaign criticized Raese for making a comment about Byrd's deceased wife, Erma Ora Byrd. Byrd was reelected by a margin of 64.4%-33.7%.

=== 2007–2009 ===
In 2007, Raese's wife, Elizabeth, launched a new statewide women's group, "Conservative Women of West Virginia." The group was active for the GOP national and state ticket in the 2008 election. More recently, the group has been supportive of some of the initiatives of the WV Republican Party, including helping with the May 2009 speaking engagement of Republican National Committee Chairman Michael Steele.

In 2008, Raese donated money to the National Republican Senatorial Committee, to the unsuccessful U.S. Senate campaign of Jay Wolfe and to the "Raese for Senate" committee. In the 2008 Republican presidential primaries, he supported former New York City Mayor Rudy Giuliani, donating $1,000 to his campaign in 2007.

=== 2010 U.S. Senate election ===
Following the death of Senator Robert C. Byrd in 2010, plans were made to hold a special election to fill the unexpired term of his U.S. Senate seat. Republican Congresswoman Shelley Moore Capito, daughter of former governor Arch A. Moore, was initially considered to be a potential candidate for the seat. Raese announced that he was considering a third Senate bid, stating that he might run to her right in a potential primary between the two. Ultimately, Capito declined to run for the seat. Raese subsequently won the Republican nomination, but was defeated by his Democratic opponent, Joe Manchin, in the general election.

=== 2012 U.S. Senate election ===
Raese was unopposed in the Republican U.S. Senate primary in 2012, garnering 61,289 votes. He once again ran against Manchin, who received 119,725 votes (80%) in the Democratic primary. In April 2012, Raese equated smoking bans with Adolf Hitler's yellow badge. He said "in Monongalia County now, I have to put a huge sticker on my buildings to say this is a smoke-free environment. This is brought to you by the government of Monongalia County. Okay? Remember Hitler used to put Star of David on everybody’s lapel, remember that? Same thing." That same day, he referred to President Franklin D. Roosevelt as "Fidel Roosevelt." Raese didn't apologize for his statements on Hitler saying "I am not going to be intimidated by a bunch of bullshit. I'm not apologizing to anybody or any organization. It's my perfect right to make a speech about meaningful subject matters in this country." He called guitarist Ted Nugent a "patriot" for having criticized President Barack Obama. Raese lost the general election to Manchin, 60.6%-36.5%.

== Personal life ==
Raese and his wife Liz have two daughters, Jane and Agnes. Liz is the founder of the Conservative Women of West Virginia (CWWV). They have homes in Palm Beach, Florida, Telluride, Colorado, and Morgantown, West Virginia. In 2010 Liz Raese was registered to vote in Florida, where their children go to school at The King's Academy in West Palm Beach, so her West Virginia voter registration was purged, leaving her unable to vote for her husband in his 2010 Senate race in West Virginia.

Raese, along with Greer Industries colleague Bob Gwynne, designed the golf course at the invitation-only Pikewood National Golf Club in Morgantown. In 2010 Golf Digest rated it a Best New Private course, "in part because of [the] dogleg par 5 around the rim of a deep gulch, the sort of audacity one would expect from amateur architects."

On October 12, 2024, Raese was arrested in Monongalia County for driving under the influence of alcohol; he was later released on bond.

== See also ==
Party political offices
Preceded by Kent S. Hall	Chair of the West Virginia Republican Party; 1986–1987	Succeeded by Hike Heiskell
Preceded by Arch Moore	Republican nominee for U.S. Senator from West Virginia (Class 2); 1984	Succeeded by John C. Yoder
Preceded by David Gallaher	Republican nominee for U.S. Senator from West Virginia (Class 1); 2006, 2010, 2012	Succeeded by Patrick Morrisey
