= Bozó =

Brazilian footballer

Personal information
- Full name: Luiz Augusto de Aguiar
- Date of birth: 11 July 1952 (age 74)
- Place of birth: São Paulo, Brazil
- Height: 1.72 m (5 ft 8 in)
- Position: Left winger

Senior career*
| Years | Team | Apps | (Gls) |
| 1973–1975 | São Bento | | |
| 1976 | Atlético Mineiro | | |
| 1977 | Santos | | |
| 1978–1980 | Guarani | | |
| 1981–1982 | Coritiba | | |
| 1982–1984 | Ferroviária | | |
| 1985 | Sport Recife | | |
| 1986–1987 | Avaí | | |
- * Club domestic league appearances and goals as of 17 January 2024

Luiz Augusto de Aguiar (born 11 July 1952), better known as Bozó, is a Brazilian former professional footballer who played as a left winger.

== Career ==
Having spent time at São Bento, Atlético Mineiro and Santos without being able to establish himself, Bozó arrived at Guarani by chance, motivated by his girlfriend being from the city of Campinas. He made history at the club by becoming Brazilian champion in 1978. He currently lives in the city of Sintra, Portugal.

== Honours ==
Guarani

- Campeonato Brasileiro: 1978
