= Božo Skoko =

Croatian academic and writer (born 1976)

Božo Skoko (born 26 February 1976 in Ljubuški, Bosnia and Herzegovina) is vice-rector for postgraduate studies and science communication at Algebra Bernays, Croatia’s largest private university, and a long-standing professor of strategic communication at the Faculty of Political Science, University of Zagreb. He was the founder and head of the Public Relations postgraduate specialist programme at the University of Zagreb. The areas of his scientific research include: public relations, communication, international relations, national identity and image and branding destination. He is a guest professor at the University of Osijek (Croatia), University of Mostar (Bosnia and Herzegovina). He has published eleven books pertaining to public relations, to branding countries, and to the identity and image of Croatia. He is one of the founders and partner in Millenium promocija, leading communications management agency in Croatia. Skoko has a doctor's degree from the Faculty of Political Science, University of Zagreb. As a consultant he was worked with numerous Croatian and international corporations, political institutions and non-governmental organizations.

== Education and professional career ==
He graduated from the Faculty of Political Science, University of Zagreb in 1999. During his studies, he was a scholarship recipient of the Croatian Scholarship Fund from California. Skoko was presented the Rector's Award on two occasions – in 1995 for his work on the history of journalism, and in 1997 for his paper on international relations. In 2003 he received his master's degree in international relations, and in 2008 his doctor's degree in political science from the University of Zagreb.

From 1996 to 2001 he worked as an associate, a journalist and an editor with Croatian Radio and Television, cooperated with the foreign edition of Večernji list and wrote for the Catholic weekly Glas Koncila.

From 2001 to 2018 he worked as a correspondent of Sarajevo's Federal Television from Zagreb, as well as a correspondent of the Radio New York Croatian program. In 1999 he was one of the founders of Millenium promocija, today one of the leading Croatian public relations agencies, and its director. As of 2001 he is a strategic communications consultant in the agency. As director and, later, consultant to the public relations company Millenium promocija, he has led numerous projects and public relations campaigns, and has advised managers, political officials, corporations and institutions in Croatia and neighboring countries, including the Delegation of the European Commission in Croatia. 2001, he began working as an assistant in public relations courses at the Faculty of Political Science, University of Zagreb. At the Faculty of Political Science at the University of Zagreb, Skoko was head of courses (from 2009.): Introduction to Public Relations and Public Relations Techniques (Journalism undergraduate study programme); Public Relations Strategy, Management of identity, Image and Brands and Corporate Communications (Journalism graduate study programme). In the year 2016. he was elected head of the newly-founded Department for strategic communication.

On November 24, 2011 the Croatian Public Relations Association (Hrvatska udruga za odnose s javnošću) assigned Skoko the Grand PRix 2011award for the development of the Croatian public relations profession. 2013. received the PRO PR Association's Award for his contribution to the development of PR in Croatia and the region of South-East Europe.

== Books published ==
He has published eleven books and more than 100 scientific papers pertaining to public relations, media, identity and image management, as well as international relations. He is among the first Croatian academics to have systematically dealt with the role of a country's image in international relations, as well as with the management of identity and image of cities and regions.

- Skoko, Božo and Frka-Petešić, Zvonimir (2026): Kroatien in 30 Geschicten, Naklada Ljevak, Zagreb
- Skoko, Božo and Frka-Petešić, Zvonimir (2024): La Croatie en 30 Histoires, Večernji list, Zagreb
- Skoko, Božo and Frka-Petešić, Zvonimir (2023., 2024. i 2025.): Hrvatska u 30 priča, Večernji list and Naklada Ljevak
- Skoko, Božo and Frka-Petešić, Zvonimir (2023., 2024. i 2025.): Croatia in 30 Stories, Večernji list and Naklada Ljevak
- Skoko, Skoko (2021): Strateško komuniciranje država – Javna diplomacija, brendiranje država i nacija, međunarodni odnosi s javnošću (Strategic Communication of States – Public Diplomacy, Branding of States and Nations, International Public Relations - Parts 1 and 2), Synopsis, Zagreb – Sarajevo; Plejada, Zagreb i Edward Bernays College (Manualia Universitatis studiorum Zagrabiensis)
- Skoko, Božo (2018): Understanding Croatia : A Collection of Essays on Croatian Identity, Independently published, Zagreb (a revised, updated edition translated into English version of "Kakvi Su Hrvati?", Fokus, 2016).
- Skoko, Božo (2016): Kakvi Su Hrvati? (What are Croats Like), Fokus, Zagreb.
- Skoko, Božo (2010): Croatia and its Neighbors - How is Croatia perceived in Bosnia and Hercegovina, Montenegro, Macedonia, Slovenia and Serbia, AGM and Novelti millennium, Zagreb
- Skoko, Božo (2009): A State as a Brand, Matica hrvatska, Zagreb
- Skoko, Božo (2006): Manual for Understanding Public Relations, Millenium promocija, Zagreb
- Skoko, Božo (2004, 2005): Croatia – Identity, Image and Promotion, Školska knjiga, Zagreb
