= 1984 United States Senate election in West Virginia =

- November 6, 1984
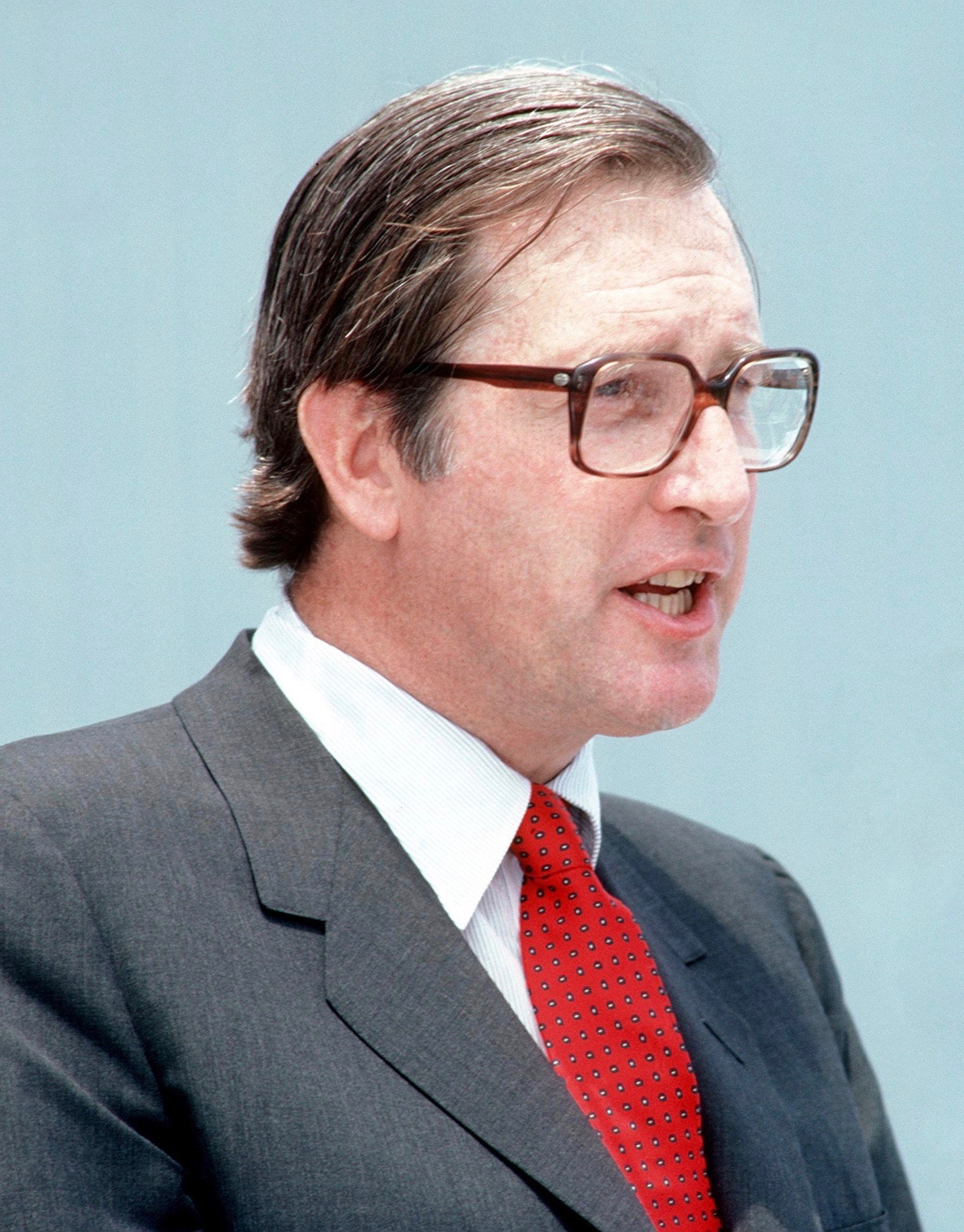

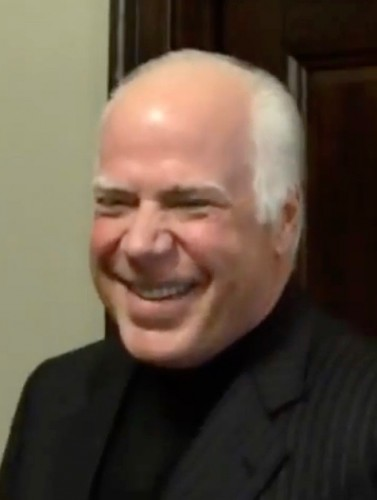
Nominee	Jay Rockefeller	John Raese
Party	Democratic	Republican
Popular vote	374,233	344,680
Percentage	51.82%	47.73%
- County results Rockefeller: 40–50% 50–60% 60–70% 70–80% Raese: 50–60% 60–70% 70–80%
U.S. senator before election
Jennings Randolph
Democratic
Elected U.S. Senator
Jay Rockefeller
Democratic

The 1984 United States Senate election in West Virginia was held on November 6, 1984. Incumbent Democratic U.S. Senator Jennings Randolph chose to retire instead of seeking re-election to a fifth term, and was succeeded by West Virginia Governor Jay Rockefeller, who defeated Republican John Raese in one of the closer races of the year.

== Democratic primary ==
=== Candidates ===
- Ken Auvil, businessman from Belington
- Homer L. Harris, Republican nominee for U.S. Representative in 1982
- Jay Rockefeller, incumbent governor of West Virginia
- Lacy W. Wright Jr., state senator from Welch

=== Results ===
Democratic primary results
Party	Candidate	Votes	%
Democratic	Jay Rockefeller	240,559	66.33%
Democratic	Lacy Wright	51,591	14.22%
Democratic	Ken Auvil	41,408	11.42%
Democratic	Homer Harris	29,138	8.03%
Total votes		362,696	100.00%

== Republican primary ==
=== Candidates ===
- Frank Deem, former state senator and delegate from Vienna
- Samuel Kusic, state senator from Weirton
- John Raese, businessman
- Henry C. Vigilianco
- Frederick A. Weiland

=== Results ===
Republican primary results
Party	Candidate	Votes	%
Republican	John Raese	61,389	47.83%
Republican	Samuel Kusic	44,820	34.92%
Republican	Frank Deem	13,707	10.68%
Republican	Frederick Weiland	5,308	4.14%
Republican	Henry C. Vigilianco	3,113	2.43%
Total votes		128,337	100.00%

== General election ==
=== Results ===
General election results
Party	Candidate	Votes	%	±%
Democratic	Jay Rockefeller	374,233	51.82%	▲1.34
Republican	John Raese	344,680	47.73%	▼1.79
Socialist Workers	Mary E. Radin	3,299	0.46%	N/A
Total votes		722,212	100.00%	N/A
Democratic hold				

== See also ==
- 1984 United States Senate elections
- 1984 West Virginia gubernatorial election
