= Denise Campbell (politician) =

American politician (born 1964)

Member of the West Virginia House of Delegates from the 43rd district
- In office January 12, 2013 – 2016

Member of the West Virginia House of Delegates from the 37th district
- In office January 2011 – January 2013
- Preceded by: Bill Proudfoot

Personal details
- Born: July 14, 1964 (age 62)
- Party: Democratic
- Education: Davis & Elkins College; Alderson Broaddus College; Marshall University

Denise Lynne Campbell (born July 14, 1964) is an American politician who was a Democratic member of the West Virginia House of Delegates representing District 43 from January 12, 2013 to 2016. Campbell served consecutively from January 2011 until January 2013 in a District 37 seat.

== Education ==
Campbell earned her associate degree in nursing from Davis & Elkins College, her BSN from Alderson Broaddus College (now Alderson Broaddus University), and her MA in administration from Marshall University.

== Elections ==
- 2012 – Redistricted to District 43 alongside fellow District 37 incumbent William G. Hartman, Campbell ran in the three-way May 8, 2012 Democratic Primary and placed first with 4,255 votes (41.5%), and placed first in the three-way two-position November 6, 2012 General election with 8,729 votes (41.2%) ahead of fellow Democratic Representative Hartman and Republican nominee Donna Auvil.
- 2010 – When District 37 Democratic Representative Bill Proudfoot retired and left a seat open, Campbell ran in the six-way May 11, 2010 Democratic Primary and placed second with 1,846 votes (22.3%), and placed first in the three-way two-position November 2, 2010 General election with 6,328 votes (35.8%) ahead of incumbent Representative Hartman and Republican nominee Wilda Sharp, who had run for the seat in 2006.
