= The Dominion Post (Morgantown) =

- The March 2, 2012 front page of The Dominion Post
- Type: Daily newspaper
- Owner(s): Ogden Newspapers
- Publisher: Robert Pinarski
- Editor: Candace Wolf
- Photo editor: Ron Rittenhouse
- Founded: 1864
- Headquarters: 1251 Earl L Core Road; Morgantown, West Virginia 26505; United States
- Circulation: 20,246 (as of 2016)
- Website: dominionpost.com

The Dominion Post is the only commercial daily newspaper in Morgantown, West Virginia, United States. It formed from the merger of the Morgantown New Dominion and the Morgantown News into the Morgantown Dominion-News which, in turn, merged with the Morgantown Post. The term New Dominion was a reference to Virginia's state nickname of "Old Dominion", referencing the separation of West Virginia from Virginia in 1863.

The Dominion Post has competition with the Fairmont Times West Virginian in the rural counties surrounding Morgantown. As Morgantown is considered part of the Pittsburgh television market, the Dominion Post has a news partnership with KDKA-TV in Pittsburgh; it serves as a second news partner to the station alongside the Pittsburgh Post-Gazette, covering West Virginia topics for the station.

== History ==
The Dominion Post traces its roots to 1864, when The Morgantown Weekly Post was founded. In 1876, the other predecessor of the paper, The New Dominion, was founded. In 1930, The New Dominion became The Dominion News. Around this time, the two papers formed the West Virginia Newspaper Publishing Company and consolidated their publishing operations. It was not until 1973 that the two papers officially merged and became The Dominion Post.

Colonel H.C. Greer bought the newspaper in 1923. When he died on August 5, 1948, ownership passed to his wife Agnes Jane Reeves Greer. She ran the paper until her death on October 21, 1972. The Dominion Post was then operated by brothers John Raese and David Raese. The paper was sold to Ogden Newspapers in 2024. An Ogden executive said the sale would help the company's other papers in the state gain more direct access to coverage on West Virginia University. In return, The Dominion Post would get access to the Ogden's statewide pool of reporters.

== Online Edition ==
The Dominion Post had a free online edition available from 1996 until January 2005, when it switched to an online subscription for digital content. The Dominion Post's website, dominionpost.com, allows users to see and navigate the individual stories published by the newspaper and to access a pdf version of the daily print edition referred to as the "e-edition".

== See also ==
- List of newspapers in West Virginia
