= U.S. Congress election, 2012 =

In 2012 elections for both houses of the United States Congress will take place:

- United States House of Representatives elections, 2012
- United States Senate elections, 2012
