= 2012 U.S Congress election =

In 2012 elections for both houses of the United States Congress took place:

- United States House of Representatives elections, 2012
- United States Senate elections, 2012
