= 2018 United States Senate elections =

- November 6, 2018 (Note: A runoff election was held in Mississippi on November 27.)
- Class 1

35 (Note: 33 Class 1 seats, as well as 2 Class 2 seats in special election) of the 100 seats in the United States Senate 51 seats needed for a majority
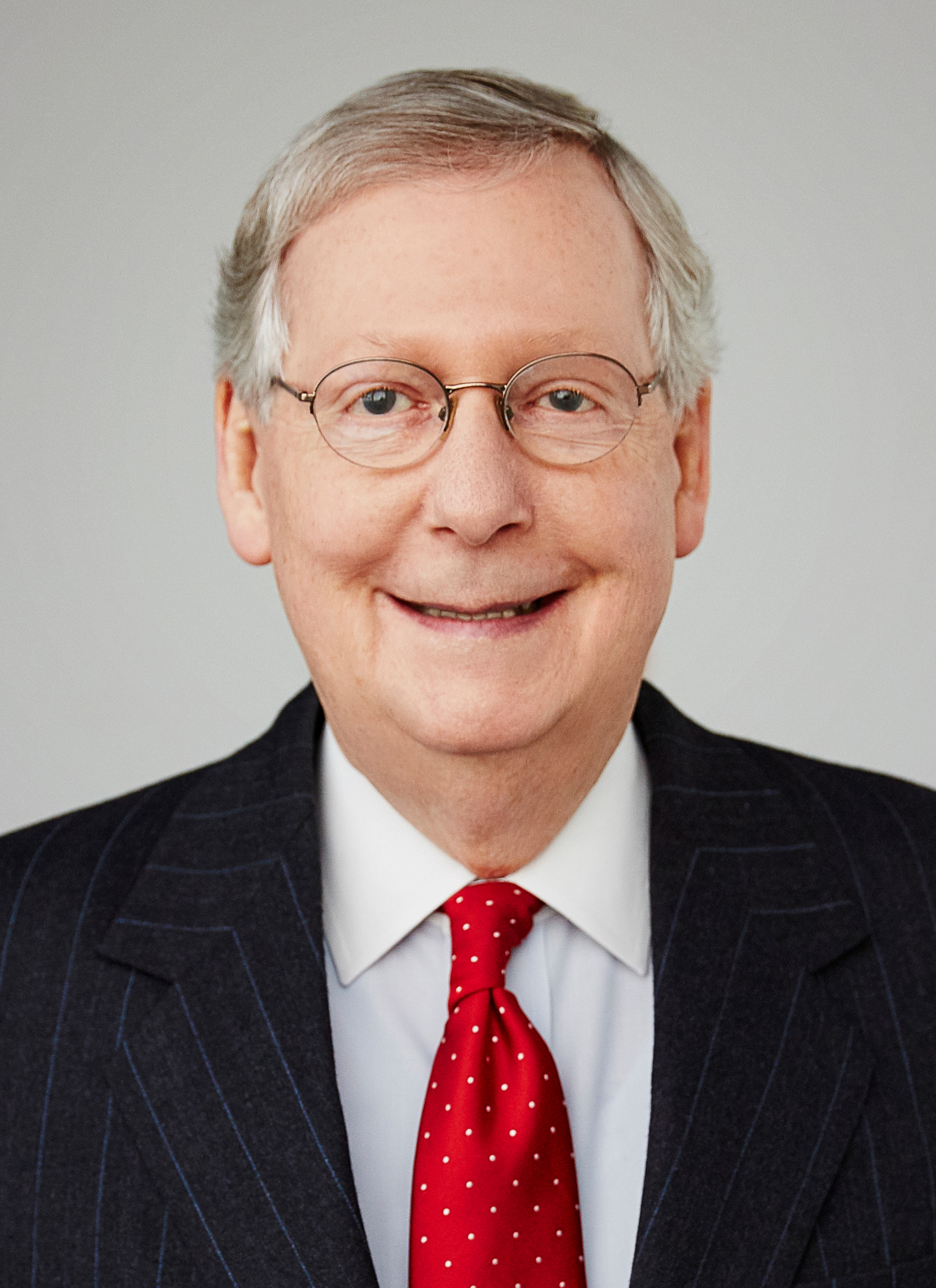

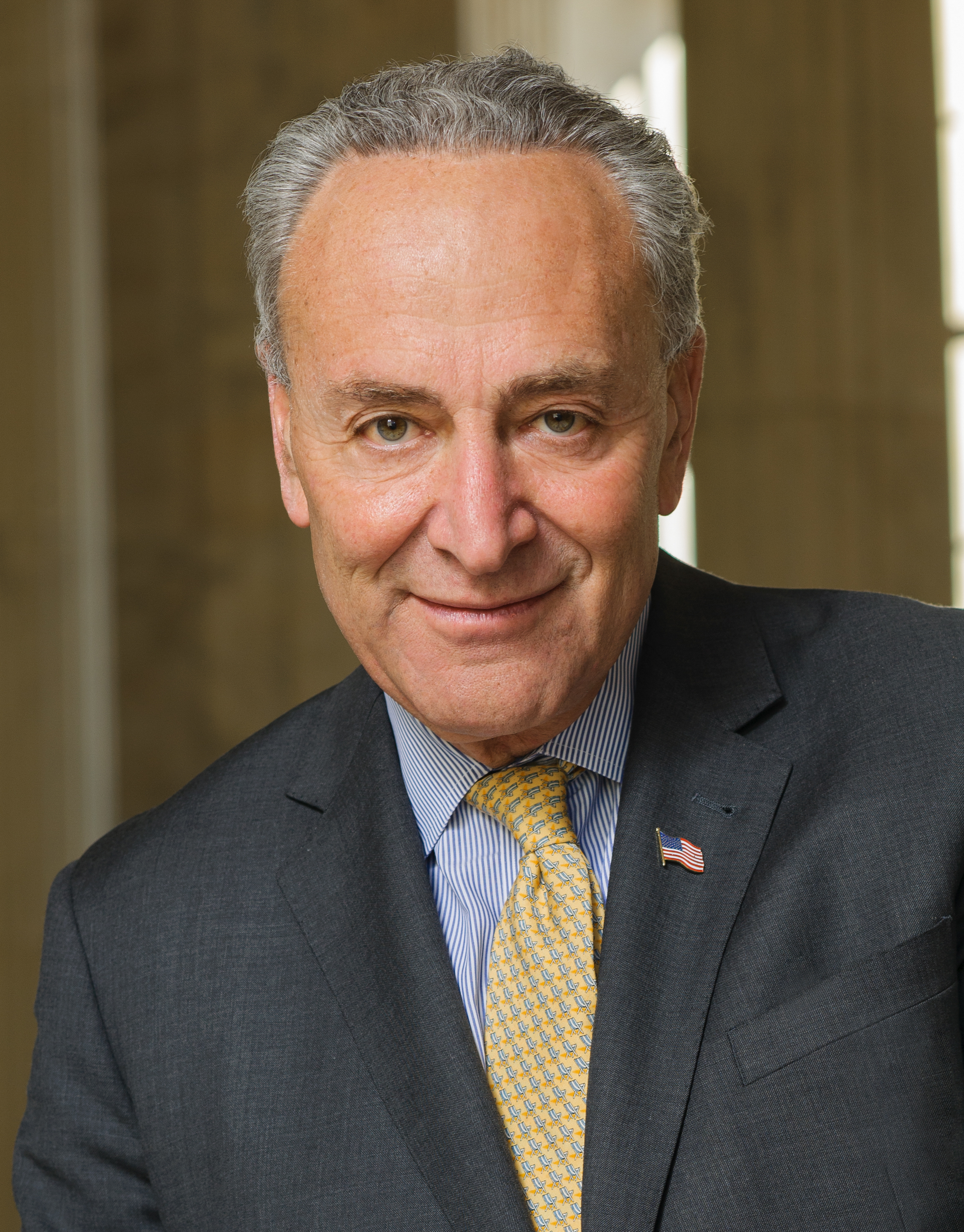
	Majority party	Minority party
Leader	Mitch McConnell	Chuck Schumer
Party	Republican	Democratic
Leader since	January 3, 2007	January 3, 2017
Leader's seat	Kentucky	New York
Seats before	51	47
Seats after	53	45
Seat change	▲2	▼2
Popular vote	33,140,380	50,433,508 (Note: Total of official results for Democratic candidates.) (Note: Both general election candidates in California were members of the Democratic Party, having won the top 2 positions in the nonpartisan blanket primary (established by the 2010 California Proposition 14), so all 11.1 million votes in California were counted for Democrats, as tabulated by the Clerk of the House. In 2012, the last time a Republican candidate for the U.S. Senate appeared on the ballot in California, 12.6 million votes were cast, of which 4.7 million, or 38%, were cast for the Republican candidate.)
Percentage	38.41%	58.45%
Seats up	9	24
Races won	11	22
	Third party
Party	Independent
Seats before	2 (Note: Both independent senators—Bernie Sanders (VT) and Angus King (ME)—caucused with the Democratic Party.)
Seats after	2
Seat change	Steady
Popular vote	808,370 (Note: Total of official results for candidates labeled "Independent".)
Percentage	0.94%
Seats up	2
Races won	2
- Results of the elections: Democratic gain Republican gain Democratic hold Republican hold Independent hold No election Rectangular inset (Minn. & Miss.): both seats up for election
Majority Leader before election
Mitch McConnell
Republican
Elected Majority Leader
Mitch McConnell
Republican

The 2018 United States Senate elections were held on November 6, 2018. Among the 100 seats, the 33 of Class 1 were contested in regular elections while two others were contested in special elections due to Senate vacancies in Minnesota and Mississippi. The regular election winners were elected to six-year terms running from January 3, 2019, to January 3, 2025. Senate Democrats had 26 seats up for election (including the seats of two Independents who caucus with them), while Senate Republicans had nine seats up for election.

To maintain their working majority of 50 senators and their party's vice president's tie-breaking vote, Republicans could only afford a net loss of one seat in these elections. The Republicans had a 52–48 majority after the 2016 elections, but they lost a seat in Alabama after Jeff Sessions resigned to become U.S. attorney general and Doug Jones, a Democrat, won in the subsequent special election. Three Republican-held seats were open as a result of retirements in Tennessee, Utah, and Arizona. Although every Democratic incumbent ran for re-election, Democrats faced an extremely unfavorable map, defending 26 seats, of which 10 were in states won by Donald Trump in the 2016 presidential election, in five states by more than 10%. Republicans, meanwhile, only had to defend nine seats, of which only one was in a state won by Hillary Clinton in 2016.

The Republicans increased their majority by defeating Democratic incumbents in Florida, Indiana, Missouri, and North Dakota, and holding the open seats in Tennessee and Utah. Democrats captured two Republican-held seats, defeating an incumbent in Nevada and winning the open seat in Arizona. This marked the first time that Republicans gained Class 1 Senate seats since 1994. To date, this remains the last time that Democrats won a Senate election in Montana and West Virginia.

The results for this election cycle were the only significant net gains made by the Republicans in what was otherwise characterized as a "blue wave" election. The Republican gains in the Senate and the Democratic gains in the House marked the first midterm election cycle since 1970 in which the president's party made net gains in one chamber of Congress while suffering net losses in the other, which also occurred in 1914, 1962, and 2022. This was also the first midterm election cycle since 2002 in which any incumbents of the non-presidential party lost re-election. The number of defeated non-presidential party incumbents (four) was the most since 1934.

== Partisan composition ==
Among the 33 Class 1 Senate seats up for regular election in 2018, twenty-three were held by Democrats, two by independents who caucused with the Senate Democrats and eight by Republicans. Class Two seats in Minnesota and Mississippi held by interim appointees were also up for election; both incumbent appointees sought election to finish their unexpired terms.

Democrats targeted Republican-held Senate seats in Arizona (open seat) and Nevada. Seats in Texas, Mississippi (at least one of the two seats) and Tennessee (open seat) were also competitive for the Democrats. Republicans targeted Democratic-held seats in Indiana, Missouri, Montana, North Dakota and West Virginia, all of which were won by Republicans in both the 2012 and 2016 presidential elections. Seats in Florida, Ohio, Pennsylvania, Wisconsin and Michigan, all of which were won by Obama in 2008 and 2012 but by Trump in 2016, were also targeted by Republicans. The Democratic-held seat in New Jersey was also considered unexpectedly competitive due to corruption allegations surrounding the Democratic incumbent.

The map was widely characterized as extremely unfavorable to Democrats, as Democrats were defending 26 states while Republicans were defending nine. Of these seats, Democrats were defending ten in states won by Donald Trump in the 2016 presidential election, while Republicans were only defending one seat in a state won by Hillary Clinton in 2016. According to FiveThirtyEight, Democrats faced the most unfavorable Senate map in 2018 that any party has ever faced in any election.

Senate Majority Leader Mitch McConnell decided to cancel the traditional August recess, which drew controversy. The US Congress traditionally goes on recess in the month of August each year, which in election years allows incumbents to leave Washington D.C. and campaign for re-election in their home state. The Democratic Party had a significantly larger number of vulnerable incumbent Senators, who became unable to campaign in person during the affected time period while their non-incumbent opponents were unaffected. The House of Representatives did not cancel their 2018 August recess.

== Results summary ==
Parties							Total
Parties	Democratic	Republican	Independent	Libertarian	Green	Other	Total
Last elections (2016)	46	52	2	0	0	0	100
Before these elections	47	51	2	0	0	0	100
Not up	23	42	0	—	—	—	65
Class 2 (2014→2020)	11	20	0	—	—	—	31
Class 3 (2016→2022)	12	22	0	—	—	—	34
Up	24	9	2	—	—	—	35
Class 1 (2012→2018)	23	8	2	—	—	—	33
Special: Class 2	1	1	0	—	—	—	2
Regular elections
Incumbent retired	0	3	0	—	—	—	3
Held by same party	—	2	—	—	—	—	2
Replaced by other party	▼1 Republican replaced by ▲1 Democrat		Steady	Steady	Steady	Steady	1
Result	1	2	0	0	0	0	3
Incumbent ran	23	5	2	—	—	—	30
Won re-election	19	4	2	—	—	—	25
Lost re-election	▼1 Republican replaced by ▲1 Democrat ▼4 Democrats replaced by ▲4 Republicans		Steady	Steady	Steady	Steady	5
Result	20	8	2	0	0	0	30
Special elections
Appointee ran	1	1	—	—	—	—	2
Appointee elected	1	1	—	—	—	—	2
Result	1	1	0	0	0	0	2
Total elected	22	11	2	0	0	0	35
Net gain/loss	▼2	▲2	Steady	Steady	Steady	Steady	2
Nationwide vote	52,224,867	34,722,926	808,370	590,051	200,599	1,262,765	90,473,222
Share	58.17%	38.67%	0.90%	0.66%	0.22%	1.41%	100%
Result	45	53	2	0	0	0	100

Source: Clerk of the U.S. House of Representatives.

== Change in composition ==
Each block represents one of the one hundred seats in the Senate. "D#" is a Democratic senator, "I#" is an independent senator and "R#" is a Republican senator. Arranged so parties are separated and a majority is clear by crossing the middle.

=== Before the elections ===
Each block indicates an incumbent senator's actions going into the election. Some "Ran" for re-election, some "Retired," and those without a note were not up for election this cycle. Before the elections, Republicans held 51 seats, Democrats held 47, and Independents held 2.

After the 2017 Senate special election in Alabama on the start of the second session in the 115th Congress.

D_{1} Ala. Gain	D_{2}	D_{3}	D_{4}	D_{5}	D_{6}	D_{7}	D_{8}	D_{9}	D_{10}
D_{20}	D_{19}	D_{18}	D_{17}	D_{16}	D_{15}	D_{14}	D_{13}	D_{12}	D_{11}
D_{21}	D_{22}	D_{23}	D_{24} Calif. Ran	D_{25} Conn. Ran	D_{26} Del. Ran	D_{27} Fla. Ran	D_{28} Hawaii; Ran	D_{29} Ind. Ran	D_{30} Md. Ran
D_{40} N.D. Ran	D_{39} N.Y. Ran	D_{38} N.M. Ran	D_{37} N.J. Ran	D_{36} Mont. Ran	D_{35} Mo. Ran	D_{34} Minn. (sp); Ran	D_{33} Minn. (reg); Ran	D_{32} Mich. Ran	D_{31} Mass. Ran
D_{41} Ohio; Ran	D_{42} Penn. Ran	D_{43} R.I. Ran	D_{44} Va. Ran	D_{45} Wash. Ran	D_{46} W.Va. Ran	D_{47} Wis. Ran	I_{1} Maine; Ran	I_{2} Vt. Ran	R_{51} Utah; Retired
Majority →									R_{51} Utah; Retired
R_{41}	R_{42}	R_{43} Miss. (reg); Ran	R_{44} Miss. (sp); Ran	R_{45} Neb. Ran	R_{46} Nev. Ran	R_{47} Texas; Ran	R_{48} Wyo. Ran	R_{49} Ariz. Retired	R_{50} Tenn. Retired
R_{40}	R_{39}	R_{38}	R_{37}	R_{36}	R_{35}	R_{34}	R_{33}	R_{32}	R_{31}
R_{21}	R_{22}	R_{23}	R_{24}	R_{25}	R_{26}	R_{27}	R_{28}	R_{29}	R_{30}
R_{20}	R_{19}	R_{18}	R_{17}	R_{16}	R_{15}	R_{14}	R_{13}	R_{12}	R_{11}
R_{1}	R_{2}	R_{3}	R_{4}	R_{5}	R_{6}	R_{7}	R_{8}	R_{9}	R_{10}

=== After the elections ===
Some senators were "Re-elected," some were a "Gain" in the seat from the other party (either by beating an incumbent or by winning an open seat), some were a "Hold" by the same party but with a different senator, and those without a note were not up for election this year.

After these elections, Democrats had 45 seats, independents had 2, and Republicans had 53.

D_{1}	D_{2}	D_{3}	D_{4}	D_{5}	D_{6}	D_{7}	D_{8}	D_{9}	D_{10}
D_{20}	D_{19}	D_{18}	D_{17}	D_{16}	D_{15}	D_{14}	D_{13}	D_{12}	D_{11}
D_{21}	D_{22}	D_{23}	D_{24} Calif. Re-elected	D_{25} Conn. Re-elected	D_{26} Del. Re-elected	D_{27} Hawaii; Re-elected	D_{28} Md. Re-elected	D_{29} Mass. Re-elected	D_{30} Mich. Re-elected
D_{40} Va. Re-elected	D_{39} R.I. Re-elected	D_{38} Pa. Re-elected	D_{37} Ohio; Re-elected	D_{36} N.Y. Re-elected	D_{35} N.M. Re-elected	D_{34} N.J. Re-elected	D_{33} Mont. Re-elected	D_{32} Minn. (sp); Elected (Note: Appointee elected)	D_{31} Minn. (reg); Re-elected
D_{41} Wash. Re-elected	D_{42} W.Va. Re-elected	D_{43} Wis. Re-elected	D_{44} Ariz. Gain	D_{45} Nev. Gain	I_{1} Maine; Re-elected	I_{2} Vt. Re-elected	R_{53} N.D. Gain	R_{52} Mo. Gain	R_{51} Ind. Gain
Majority →									R_{51} Ind. Gain
R_{41}	R_{42}	R_{43} Miss. (reg); Re-elected	R_{44} Miss. (sp); Elected	R_{45} Neb. Re-elected	R_{46} Tenn. Hold	R_{47} Tex. Re-elected	R_{48} Utah; Hold	R_{49} Wyo. Re-elected	R_{50} Fla. Gain
R_{40}	R_{39}	R_{38}	R_{37}	R_{36}	R_{35}	R_{34}	R_{33}	R_{32}	R_{31}
R_{21}	R_{22}	R_{23}	R_{24}	R_{25}	R_{26}	R_{27}	R_{28}	R_{29}	R_{30}
R_{20}	R_{19}	R_{18}	R_{17}	R_{16}	R_{15}	R_{14}	R_{13}	R_{12}	R_{11}
R_{1}	R_{2}	R_{3}	R_{4}	R_{5}	R_{6}	R_{7}	R_{8}	R_{9}	R_{10}

Key:

D_{#}	Democratic
R_{#}	Republican
I_{#}	Independent, caucusing with Democrats

== Predictions ==
Several sites and individuals publish predictions of competitive seats. These predictions look at factors such as the strength of the incumbent (if the incumbent is running for re-election) and the other candidates, and the state's partisan lean (reflected in part by the state's Cook Partisan Voting Index rating). The predictions assign ratings to each seat, indicating the predicted advantage that a party has in winning that seat.

Most election predictors used:

- "tossup": no advantage
- "tilt" (used by some predictors): advantage that is not quite as strong as "lean"
- "lean": slight advantage
- "likely" or "favored": significant, but surmountable, advantage
- "safe" or "solid": near-certain chance of victory

Constituency		Incumbent		2018 election ratings										
State	PVI	Senator	Last election (Note: The last elections for this group of senators were in 2012, except for those who were appointed after the resignation or passing of a sitting senator, as noted.)	Cook Oct 26, 2018	IE Nov 1, 2018	Sabato Nov 5, 2018	NYT Nov 5, 2018	Fox News (Note: The Fox News Midterm Power Rankings uniquely does not contain a category for Safe/Solid races) Nov 5, 2018	CNN Nov 2, 2018	RCP Nov 5, 2018	Daily Kos Nov 5, 2018	Politico Nov 5, 2018	538 (Note: Reflects the classic version of the forecast model.) Nov 6, 2018	Result
Arizona	R+5	Jeff Flake (retiring)	49.2% R	Tossup	Tilt D (flip)	Lean D (flip)	Tossup	Tossup	Tossup	Tossup	Tossup	Tossup	Lean D (flip)	Sinema; 50.0% D (flip)
California	D+12	Dianne Feinstein	62.5% D	Safe D	Safe D	Safe D	Safe D	Likely D	Safe D	Safe D	Safe D	Safe D	Safe D	Feinstein; 54.2% D
Connecticut	D+6	Chris Murphy	54.8% D	Safe D	Safe D	Safe D	Safe D	Likely D	Safe D	Safe D	Safe D	Safe D	Safe D	Murphy; 59.5% D
Delaware	D+6	Tom Carper	66.4% D	Safe D	Safe D	Safe D	Safe D	Likely D	Safe D	Safe D	Safe D	Safe D	Safe D	Carper; 60.0% D
Florida	R+2	Bill Nelson	55.2% D	Tossup	Tilt D	Lean D	Tossup	Tossup	Tossup	Tossup	Tossup	Tossup	Lean D	Scott; 50.1% R (flip)
Hawaii	D+18	Mazie Hirono	62.6% D	Safe D	Safe D	Safe D	Safe D	Likely D	Safe D	Safe D	Safe D	Safe D	Safe D	Hirono; 71.2% D
Indiana	R+9	Joe Donnelly	50.0% D	Tossup	Tossup	Lean R (flip)	Tossup	Tossup	Tossup	Tossup	Tossup	Tossup	Lean D	Braun; 50.7% R (flip)
Maine	D+3	Angus King	52.9% I	Safe I	Safe I	Safe I	Safe I	Likely I	Safe I	Safe I	Safe I	Safe I	Safe I	King; 54.3% I
Maryland	D+12	Ben Cardin	56.0% D	Safe D	Safe D	Safe D	Safe D	Likely D	Safe D	Safe D	Safe D	Safe D	Safe D	Cardin; 64.9% D
Massachusetts	D+12	Elizabeth Warren	53.7% D	Safe D	Safe D	Safe D	Safe D	Likely D	Safe D	Safe D	Safe D	Safe D	Safe D	Warren; 60.3% D
Michigan	D+1	Debbie Stabenow	58.8% D	Likely D	Safe D	Safe D	Likely D	Likely D	Likely D	Lean D	Safe D	Likely D	Safe D	Stabenow; 52.3% D
Minnesota (regular)	D+1	Amy Klobuchar	65.2% D	Safe D	Safe D	Safe D	Safe D	Likely D	Safe D	Safe D	Safe D	Safe D	Safe D	Klobuchar; 60.3% D
Minnesota (special)	D+1	Tina Smith	Appointed (2018) (Note: Democrat Al Franken won with 53.2% of the vote in 2014, but resigned on January 2, 2018.)	Lean D	Likely D	Likely D	Lean D	Likely D	Likely D	Lean D	Likely D	Likely D	Likely D	Smith; 53.0% D
Mississippi (regular)	R+9	Roger Wicker	57.1% R	Safe R	Safe R	Safe R	Safe R	Likely R	Safe R	Safe R	Safe R	Safe R	Safe R	Wicker; 58.5% R
Mississippi (special) (Note: Special elections in Mississippi are nonpartisan, therefore party affiliation is not listed on the ballot.)	R+9	Cindy Hyde-Smith	Appointed (2018) (Note: Republican Thad Cochran won with 59.9% of the vote in 2014, but resigned on April 1, 2018 due to declining health.)	Lean R	Safe R	Likely R	Lean R	Lean R	Safe R	Likely R	Likely R	Likely R	Lean R	Hyde-Smith; 53.6% R
Missouri	R+9	Claire McCaskill	54.8% D	Tossup	Tilt R (flip)	Lean R (flip)	Tossup	Tossup	Tossup	Tossup	Tossup	Tossup	Tossup	Hawley; 51.4% R (flip)
Montana	R+11	Jon Tester	48.6% D	Tossup	Tilt D	Lean D	Tossup	Lean D	Lean D	Tossup	Tossup	Lean D	Likely D	Tester; 50.3% D
Nebraska	R+14	Deb Fischer	57.8% R	Safe R	Safe R	Safe R	Safe R	Likely R	Safe R	Safe R	Safe R	Safe R	Safe R	Fischer; 57.7% R
Nevada	D+1	Dean Heller	45.9% R	Tossup	Tilt D (flip)	Lean D (flip)	Tossup	Tossup	Tossup	Tossup	Tossup	Tossup	Tossup	Rosen; 50.4% D (flip)
New Jersey	D+7	Bob Menendez	58.9% D	Tossup	Likely D	Likely D	Tossup	Lean D	Lean D	Lean D	Lean D	Lean D	Likely D	Menendez; 54.0% D
New Mexico	D+3	Martin Heinrich	51.0% D	Safe D	Safe D	Safe D	Safe D	Likely D	Safe D	Safe D	Safe D	Safe D	Safe D	Heinrich; 54.1% D
New York	D+11	Kirsten Gillibrand	72.2% D	Safe D	Safe D	Safe D	Safe D	Likely D	Safe D	Safe D	Safe D	Safe D	Safe D	Gillibrand; 67.0% D
North Dakota	R+16	Heidi Heitkamp	50.2% D	Lean R (flip)	Lean R (flip)	Lean R (flip)	Lean R (flip)	Likely R (flip)	Lean R (flip)	Lean R (flip)	Lean R (flip)	Lean R (flip)	Lean R (flip)	Cramer; 55.4% R (flip)
Ohio	R+3	Sherrod Brown	50.7% D	Likely D	Safe D	Likely D	Likely D	Likely D	Likely D	Lean D	Likely D	Likely D	Safe D	Brown; 53.4% D
Pennsylvania	EVEN	Bob Casey Jr.	53.7% D	Likely D	Safe D	Safe D	Likely D	Likely D	Likely D	Likely D	Safe D	Likely D	Safe D	Casey; 55.7% D
Rhode Island	D+10	Sheldon Whitehouse	64.8% D	Safe D	Safe D	Safe D	Safe D	Likely D	Safe D	Safe D	Safe D	Safe D	Safe D	Whitehouse; 61.5% D
Tennessee	R+14	Bob Corker (retiring)	64.9% R	Tossup	Lean R	Lean R	Tossup	Lean R	Tossup	Tossup	Lean R	Lean R	Likely R	Blackburn; 54.7% R
Texas	R+8	Ted Cruz	56.5% R	Tossup	Likely R	Lean R	Tossup	Lean R	Lean R	Lean R	Lean R	Lean R	Likely R	Cruz; 50.9% R
Utah	R+20	Orrin Hatch (retiring)	65.3% R	Safe R	Safe R	Safe R	Safe R	Likely R	Safe R	Safe R	Safe R	Safe R	Safe R	Romney; 62.6% R
Vermont	D+15	Bernie Sanders	71.0% I	Safe I	Safe I	Safe I	Safe I	Likely I	Safe I	Safe I	Safe I	Safe I	Safe I	Sanders; 67.4% I
Virginia	D+1	Tim Kaine	52.3% D	Safe D	Safe D	Safe D	Safe D	Likely D	Safe D	Safe D	Safe D	Safe D	Safe D	Kaine; 57.0% D
Washington	D+7	Maria Cantwell	60.5% D	Safe D	Safe D	Safe D	Safe D	Likely D	Safe D	Safe D	Safe D	Safe D	Safe D	Cantwell; 58.4% D
West Virginia	R+20	Joe Manchin	60.6% D	Lean D	Tilt D	Lean D	Lean D	Lean D	Lean D	Tossup	Lean D	Lean D	Likely D	Manchin; 49.6% D
Wisconsin	EVEN	Tammy Baldwin	51.4% D	Likely D	Safe D	Likely D	Likely D	Likely D	Likely D	Lean D	Likely D	Likely D	Safe D	Baldwin; 55.4% D
Wyoming	R+25	John Barrasso	75.7% R	Safe R	Safe R	Safe R	Safe R	Likely R	Safe R	Safe R	Safe R	Safe R	Safe R	Barrasso; 67.0% R
Overall (Note: Democratic total includes 2 Independents who caucus with the Democrats)				D - 43; R - 48; 9 tossups	D - 48; R - 51; 1 tossup	D - 48; R - 52; 0 tossups	D - 43; R - 48; 9 tossups	D - 45; R - 50; 5 tossups	D - 45; R - 49; 6 tossups	D - 43; R - 49; 8 tossups	D - 44; R - 50; 6 tossups	D - 45; R - 50; 5 tossups	D - 48; R - 50; 2 tossups	Results: D - 47; R - 53

== Election dates ==
These are the election dates for the regularly scheduled general elections.

State	Filing deadline	Primary election	Primary run-off (if necessary)	General election	Poll closing (Eastern Time)
Arizona	May 30, 2018	August 28, 2018	N/A	November 6, 2018	9pm
California	March 9, 2018	June 5, 2018	N/A	November 6, 2018	11pm
Connecticut	June 12, 2018	August 14, 2018	N/A	November 6, 2018	8pm
Delaware	July 10, 2018	September 6, 2018	N/A	November 6, 2018	8pm
Florida	May 4, 2018	August 28, 2018	N/A	November 6, 2018	7pm and 8pm
Hawaii	June 5, 2018	August 11, 2018	N/A	November 6, 2018	11pm
Indiana	February 9, 2018	May 8, 2018	N/A	November 6, 2018	6pm and 7pm
Maine	March 15, 2018	June 12, 2018	N/A	November 6, 2018	8pm
Maryland	February 27, 2018	June 26, 2018	N/A	November 6, 2018	8pm
Massachusetts	June 5, 2018	September 4, 2018	N/A	November 6, 2018	8pm
Michigan	April 24, 2018	August 7, 2018	N/A	November 6, 2018	8pm and 9pm
Minnesota	June 5, 2018	August 14, 2018	N/A	November 6, 2018	9pm
Mississippi	March 1, 2018	June 5, 2018	June 26, 2018	November 6, 2018	8pm
Mississippi (special)	March 26, 2018	November 6, 2018	N/A	November 27, 2018 (Note: Mississippi held a run-off for the special election on November 27, 2018 because no candidate won a majority of the vote in the November 6, 2018 jungle primary.)	8pm
Missouri	March 27, 2018	August 7, 2018	N/A	November 6, 2018	8pm
Montana	March 12, 2018	June 5, 2018	N/A	November 6, 2018	10pm
Nebraska	March 1, 2018	May 15, 2018	N/A	November 6, 2018	9pm
Nevada	March 16, 2018	June 12, 2018	N/A	November 6, 2018	10pm
New Jersey	April 2, 2018	June 5, 2018	N/A	November 6, 2018	8pm
New Mexico	March 13, 2018	June 5, 2018	N/A	November 6, 2018	9pm
New York	April 12, 2018	June 26, 2018	N/A	November 6, 2018	9pm
North Dakota	April 9, 2018	June 12, 2018	N/A	November 6, 2018	8pm and 9pm
Ohio	February 7, 2018	May 8, 2018	N/A	November 6, 2018	7:30pm
Pennsylvania	March 20, 2018	May 15, 2018	N/A	November 6, 2018	8pm
Rhode Island	June 27, 2018	September 12, 2018	N/A	November 6, 2018	8pm
Tennessee	April 5, 2018	August 2, 2018	N/A	November 6, 2018	8pm
Texas	December 11, 2017	March 6, 2018	May 22, 2018 (unnecessary)	November 6, 2018	8pm and 9pm
Utah	March 15, 2018	June 26, 2018	N/A	November 6, 2018	10pm
Vermont	May 31, 2018	August 14, 2018	N/A	November 6, 2018	7pm
Virginia	March 29, 2018	June 12, 2018	N/A	November 6, 2018	7pm
Washington	May 18, 2018	August 7, 2018	N/A	November 6, 2018	11pm
West Virginia	January 27, 2018	May 8, 2018	N/A	November 6, 2018	7:30pm
Wisconsin	June 1, 2018	August 14, 2018	N/A	November 6, 2018	9pm
Wyoming	June 1, 2018	August 21, 2018	N/A	November 6, 2018	9pm

== Gains and losses ==
=== Retirements ===
Map of retirements: Republican incumbent Democratic incumbent Independent incumbent Republican incumbent retired

Three Republicans retired instead of seeking re-election.

State	Senator	Age at end of term	Assumed office	Replaced by
Arizona	Jeff Flake	56	2013	Kyrsten Sinema
Tennessee	Bob Corker	66	2007	Marsha Blackburn
Utah	Orrin Hatch	84	1977	Mitt Romney

=== Defeats ===
Four Democrats and one Republican sought re-election but lost in the general election.

State	Senator	Age at end of term	Assumed office	Replaced by
Florida	Bill Nelson	76	2001	Rick Scott
Indiana	Joe Donnelly	63	2013	Mike Braun
Missouri	Claire McCaskill	65	2007	Josh Hawley
Nevada	Dean Heller	58	2011 (Note: Appointed to the seat following the resignation of John Ensign.)	Jacky Rosen
North Dakota	Heidi Heitkamp	63	2013	Kevin Cramer

=== Post-election changes ===
One Republican resigned before the start of the 116th Congress on December 31, 2018, and another Republican resigned during the 116th Congress for health reasons. Initially, all were replaced by Republican appointees. In Arizona, a 2020 special election was held prior to the 2022 Senate elections for the remainder of the Class 3 term, where Democrat Mark Kelly won the special election to succeed Republican appointee Martha McSally, who lost election to finish the term.

State	Senator	Replaced by
Arizona (Class 3)	Jon Kyl	Martha McSally
Georgia (Class 3)	Johnny Isakson	Kelly Loeffler
Arizona (Class 3)	Martha McSally	Mark Kelly

== Race summary ==
=== Special elections during the preceding Congress ===
In these special elections, the winners were seated before January 3, 2019, when elected and qualified. They are ordered by election date, then by state and by class.

State	Incumbent			Result	Candidates
State	Senator	Party	Electoral history	Result	Candidates
Minnesota (Class 2)	Tina Smith	DFL	2018 (appointed)	Interim appointee elected.	▌ ✓ Tina Smith (DFL) 53.0%; ▌Karin Housley (Republican) 42.4%; ▌Sarah Wellington (Legal Marijuana Now) 3.7%; ▌Jerry Trooien (Independent) 0.9%
Mississippi (Class 2)	Cindy Hyde-Smith	Republican	2018 (appointed)	Interim appointee elected.	▌ ✓ Cindy Hyde-Smith (Republican) 53.6%; ▌Mike Espy (Democratic) 46.4%

=== Elections leading to the next Congress ===
In these general elections, the winners were elected for the term beginning January 3, 2019.

All of the elections involve the Class 1 seats and they are ordered by state.

State	Incumbent			Result	Candidates
State	Senator	Party	Electoral history	Result	Candidates
Arizona	Jeff Flake	Republican	2012	Incumbent retired. Democratic gain.	▌ ✓ Kyrsten Sinema (Democratic) 50.0%; ▌Martha McSally (Republican) 47.6%; ▌Angela Green (Green) 2.4%
California	Dianne Feinstein	Democratic	1992 (special); 1994; 2000; 2006; 2012	Incumbent re-elected.	▌ ✓ Dianne Feinstein (Democratic) 54.2%; ▌Kevin de León (Democratic) 45.8%
Connecticut	Chris Murphy	Democratic	2012	Incumbent re-elected.	▌ ✓ Chris Murphy (Democratic) 59.5%; ▌Matthew Corey (Republican) 39.4%; Others: ▌Richard Lion (Libertarian) 0.6%; ▌Jeff Russell (Green) 0.5%
Delaware	Tom Carper	Democratic	2000; 2006; 2012	Incumbent re-elected.	▌ ✓ Tom Carper (Democratic) 60.0%; ▌Robert Arlett (Republican) 37.8%; Others: ▌Demitri Theodoropoulos (Green) 1.2%; ▌Nadine Frost (Libertarian) 1.1%
Florida	Bill Nelson	Democratic	2000; 2006; 2012	Incumbent lost re-election. Republican gain. Winner delayed start of term until January 8, 2019, to finish his term as Governor of Florida.	▌ ✓ Rick Scott (Republican) 50.1%; ▌Bill Nelson (Democratic) 49.9%
Hawaii	Mazie Hirono	Democratic	2012	Incumbent re-elected.	▌ ✓ Mazie Hirono (Democratic) 71.2%; ▌Ron Curtis (Republican) 28.8%
Indiana	Joe Donnelly	Democratic	2012	Incumbent lost re-election. Republican gain.	▌ ✓ Mike Braun (Republican) 50.9%; ▌Joe Donnelly (Democratic) 45.0%; ▌Lucy Brenton (Libertarian) 4.0%
Maine	Angus King	Independent	2012	Incumbent re-elected.	▌ ✓ Angus King (Independent) 54.3%; ▌Eric Brakey (Republican) 35.2%; ▌Zak Ringelstein (Democratic) 10.4%
Maryland	Ben Cardin	Democratic	2006; 2012	Incumbent re-elected.	▌ ✓ Ben Cardin (Democratic) 64.9%; ▌Tony Campbell (Republican) 30.3%; ▌Neal Simon (Independent) 3.7%; ▌Arvin Vohra (Libertarian) 1.0%
Massachusetts	Elizabeth Warren	Democratic	2012	Incumbent re-elected.	▌ ✓ Elizabeth Warren (Democratic) 60.4%; ▌Geoff Diehl (Republican) 36.2%; ▌Shiva Ayyadurai (Independent) 3.4%
Michigan	Debbie Stabenow	Democratic	2000; 2006; 2012	Incumbent re-elected.	▌ ✓ Debbie Stabenow (Democratic) 52.3%; ▌John James (Republican) 45.8%; Others: ▌Marcia Squier (Independent) 1.0%; ▌George Huffman III (Constitution) 0.6%; ▌John Wilhelm (Natural Law) 0.4%
Minnesota	Amy Klobuchar	DFL	2006; 2012	Incumbent re-elected.	▌ ✓ Amy Klobuchar (DFL) 60.3%; ▌Jim Newberger (Republican) 36.2%; ▌Dennis Schuller (Legal Marijuana Now) 2.5%; ▌Paula M. Overby (Green) 0.9%
Mississippi	Roger Wicker	Republican	2007 (appointed); 2008 (special); 2012	Incumbent re-elected.	▌ ✓ Roger Wicker (Republican) 58.5%; ▌David Baria (Democratic) 39.5%; Others: ▌Danny Bedwell (Libertarian) 1.4%; ▌Shawn O'Hara (Reform) 0.6%
Missouri	Claire McCaskill	Democratic	2006; 2012	Incumbent lost re-election. Republican gain.	▌ ✓ Josh Hawley (Republican) 51.4%; ▌Claire McCaskill (Democratic) 45.6%; Others: ▌Craig O'Dear (Independent) 1.4%; ▌Japheth Campbell (Libertarian) 1.1%; ▌Jo Crain (Green) 0.5%
Montana	Jon Tester	Democratic	2006; 2012	Incumbent re-elected.	▌ ✓ Jon Tester (Democratic) 50.3%; ▌Matt Rosendale (Republican) 46.8%; ▌Rick Breckenridge (Libertarian) 2.9%
Nebraska	Deb Fischer	Republican	2012	Incumbent re-elected.	▌ ✓ Deb Fischer (Republican) 57.7%; ▌Jane Raybould (Democratic) 38.6%; ▌Jim Schultz (Libertarian) 3.7%
Nevada	Dean Heller	Republican	2011 (appointed); 2012	Incumbent lost re-election. Democratic gain.	▌ ✓ Jacky Rosen (Democratic) 50.4%; ▌Dean Heller (Republican) 45.4%; Others: ▌Barry Michaels (Independent) 1.0%; ▌Tim Hagan (Libertarian) 0.9%; ▌Kamau Bakari (Independent American) 0.7%
New Jersey	Bob Menendez	Democratic	2006 (appointed); 2006; 2012	Incumbent re-elected.	▌ ✓ Bob Menendez (Democratic) 54.0%; ▌Bob Hugin (Republican) 42.8%; Others: ▌Madelyn Hoffman (Green) 0.8%; ▌Murray Sabrin (Libertarian) 0.7%; ▌Natalie Rivera (For The People) 0.6%; ▌Tricia Flanagan (New Day NJ) 0.5%; ▌Kevin Kimple (Make It Simple) 0.3%; ▌Hank Schroeder (Economic Growth) 0.3%
New Mexico	Martin Heinrich	Democratic	2012	Incumbent re-elected.	▌ ✓ Martin Heinrich (Democratic) 54.1%; ▌Mick Rich (Republican) 30.5%; ▌Gary Johnson (Libertarian) 15.4%
New York	Kirsten Gillibrand	Democratic	2009 (appointed); 2010 (special); 2012	Incumbent re-elected.	▌ ✓ Kirsten Gillibrand (Democratic) 67.0%; ▌Chele Chiavacci Farley (Republican) 33.0%
North Dakota	Heidi Heitkamp	Democratic-NPL	2012	Incumbent lost re-election. Republican gain.	▌ ✓ Kevin Cramer (Republican) 55.5%; ▌Heidi Heitkamp (Democratic-NPL) 44.5%
Ohio	Sherrod Brown	Democratic	2006; 2012	Incumbent re-elected.	▌ ✓ Sherrod Brown (Democratic) 53.4%; ▌Jim Renacci (Republican) 46.6%
Pennsylvania	Bob Casey Jr.	Democratic	2006; 2012	Incumbent re-elected.	▌ ✓ Bob Casey Jr. (Democratic) 55.7%; ▌Lou Barletta (Republican) 42.6%; Others: ▌Dale Kerns (Libertarian) 1.0%; ▌Neal Gale (Green) 0.6%
Rhode Island	Sheldon Whitehouse	Democratic	2006; 2012	Incumbent re-elected.	▌ ✓ Sheldon Whitehouse (Democratic) 61.6%; ▌Robert Flanders (Republican) 38.4%
Tennessee	Bob Corker	Republican	2006; 2012	Incumbent retired. Republican hold.	▌ ✓ Marsha Blackburn (Republican) 54.7%; ▌Phil Bredesen (Democratic) 43.9%; Others: ▌Trudy Austin (Independent) 0.4%; ▌Dean Hill (Independent) 0.4%; ▌Kris Todd (Independent) 0.2%; ▌John Carico (Independent) 0.2%; ▌Breton Phillips (Independent) 0.1%; ▌Kevin McCants (Independent) 0.1%
Texas	Ted Cruz	Republican	2012	Incumbent re-elected.	▌ ✓ Ted Cruz (Republican) 50.9%; ▌Beto O'Rourke (Democratic) 48.3%; ▌Neal Dikeman (Libertarian) 0.8%
Utah	Orrin Hatch	Republican	1976; 1982; 1988; 1994; 2000; 2006; 2012	Incumbent retired. Republican hold.	▌ ✓ Mitt Romney (Republican) 62.6%; ▌Jenny Wilson (Democratic) 30.9%; ▌Tim Aalders (Constitution) 2.7%; ▌Craig Bowden (Libertarian) 2.6%; ▌Reed McCandless (Independent American) 1.2%
Vermont	Bernie Sanders	Independent	2006; 2012	Incumbent re-elected.	▌ ✓ Bernie Sanders (Independent) 67.4%; ▌Lawrence Zupan (Republican) 27.5%
Virginia	Tim Kaine	Democratic	2012	Incumbent re-elected.	▌ ✓ Tim Kaine (Democratic) 57.1%; ▌Corey Stewart (Republican) 41.1%; ▌Matt Waters (Libertarian) 1.8%
Washington	Maria Cantwell	Democratic	2000; 2006; 2012	Incumbent re-elected.	▌ ✓ Maria Cantwell (Democratic) 58.4%; ▌Susan Hutchison (Republican) 41.6%
West Virginia	Joe Manchin	Democratic	2010 (special); 2012	Incumbent re-elected.	▌ ✓ Joe Manchin (Democratic) 49.6%; ▌Patrick Morrisey (Republican) 46.3%; ▌Rusty Hollen (Libertarian) 4.1%
Wisconsin	Tammy Baldwin	Democratic	2012	Incumbent re-elected.	▌ ✓ Tammy Baldwin (Democratic) 55.4%; ▌Leah Vukmir (Republican) 44.6%
Wyoming	John Barrasso	Republican	2007 (appointed); 2008 (special); 2012	Incumbent re-elected.	▌ ✓ John Barrasso (Republican) 67.1%; ▌Gary Trauner (Democratic) 30.1%; ▌Joe Porambo (Libertarian) 2.8%

== Closest races ==
In twelve races the margin of victory was under 10%.

State	Party of winner	Margin
Florida	Republican (flip)	0.12%
Arizona	Democratic (flip)	2.34%
Texas	Republican	2.57%
West Virginia	Democratic	3.31%
Montana	Democratic	3.55%
Nevada	Democratic (flip)	5.03%
Missouri	Republican (flip)	5.81%
Indiana	Republican (flip)	5.89% (Note: Indiana was the "tipping point" state.)
Michigan	Democratic	6.51%
Ohio	Democratic	6.85%
Mississippi (special)	Republican	7.27%
California	Democratic	8.33% (Note: Under California's "jungle primary" system, the general election was between two Democrats.)

== Arizona ==
Arizona election
- Turnout: 64.85%
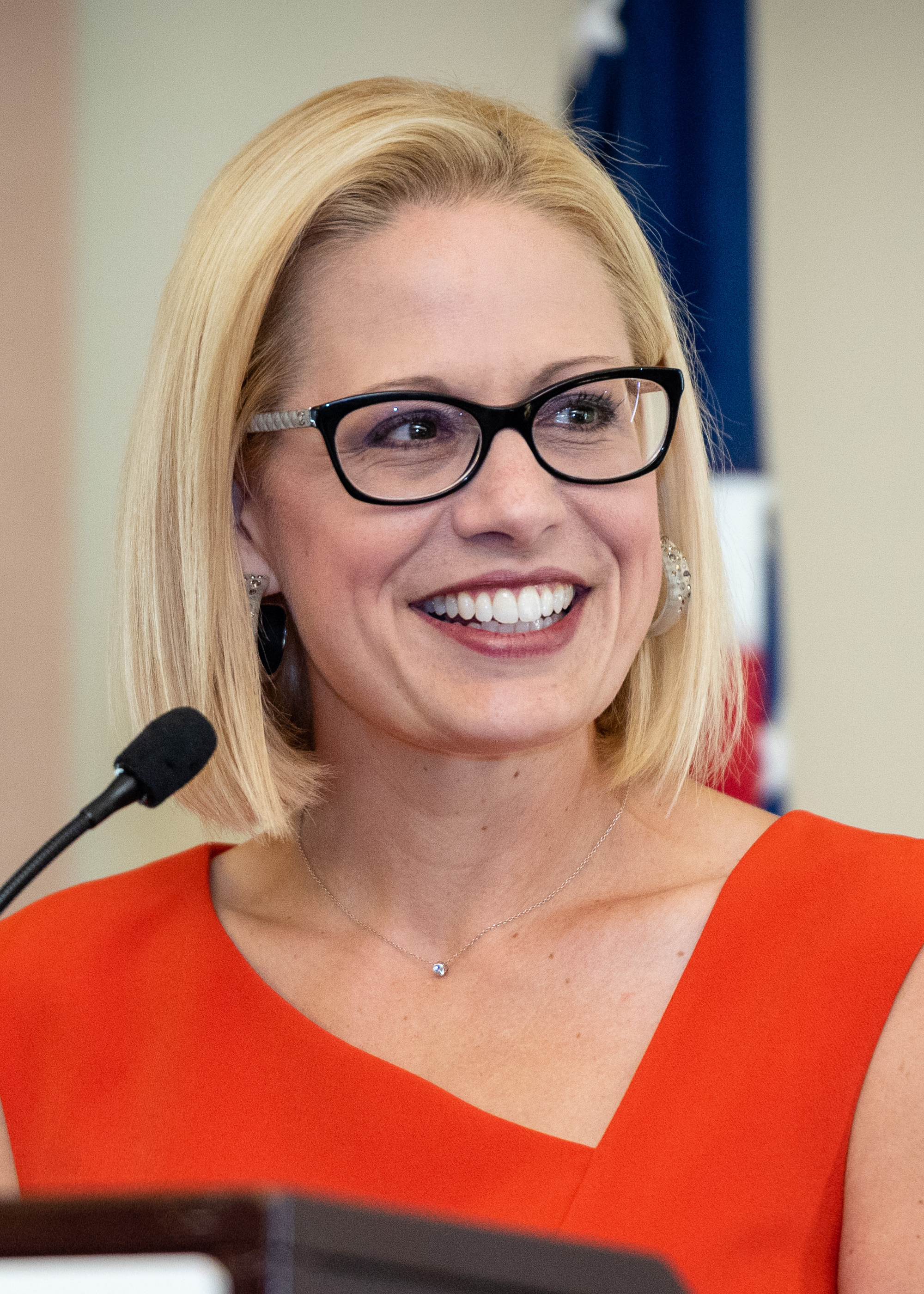

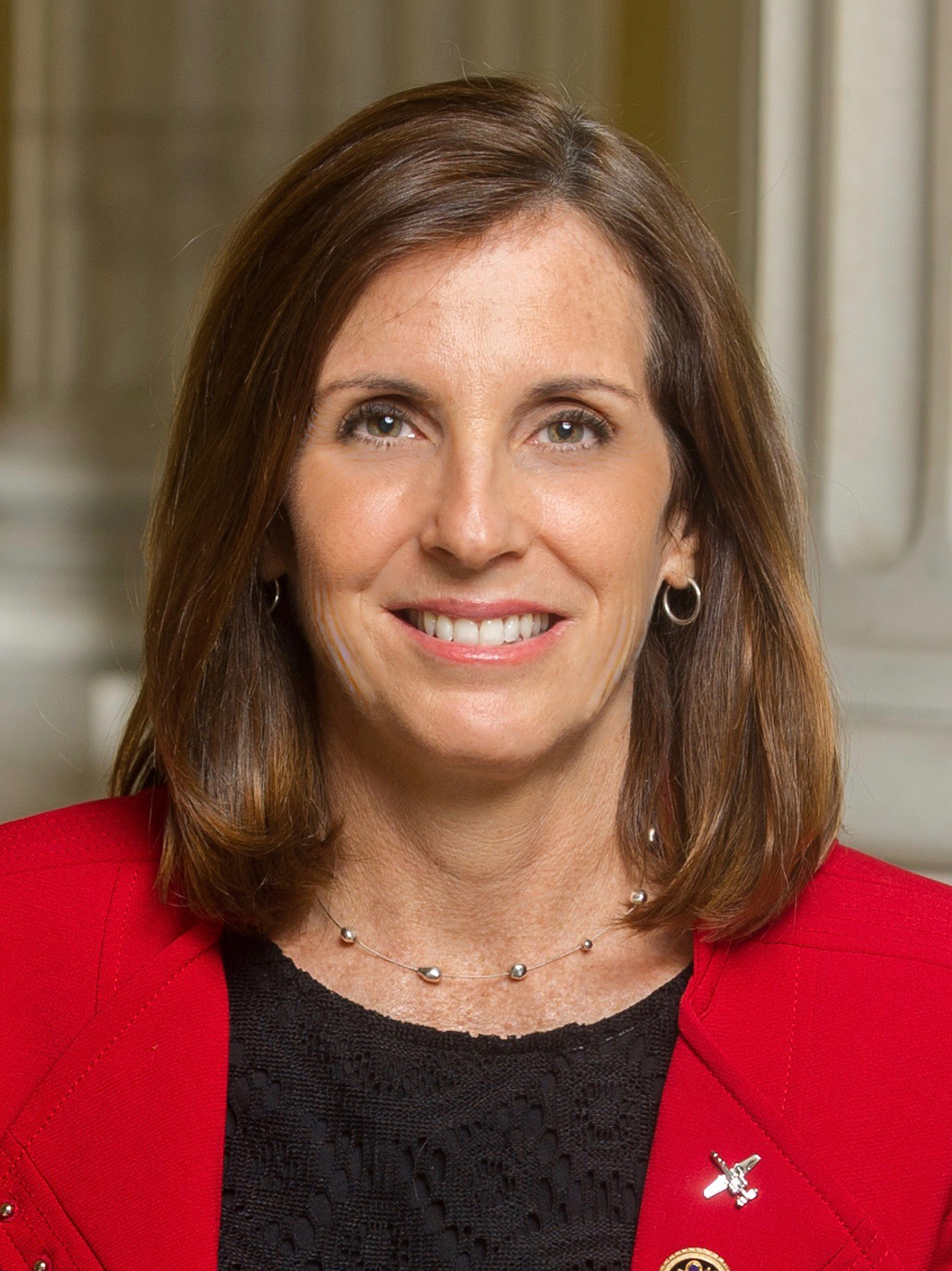
Nominee	Kyrsten Sinema	Martha McSally
Party	Democratic	Republican
Popular vote	1,191,100	1,135,200
Percentage	49.96%	47.61%
- Sinema: 50–60% 60–70% McSally: 50–60% 60–70% 70–80%
U.S. senator before election
Jeff Flake
Republican
Elected U.S. senator
Kyrsten Sinema
Democratic

One-term Republican Jeff Flake was elected with 49% of the vote in 2012. He chose not to run for re-election.

U.S. Representative Martha McSally won the Republican nomination in a three-way primary on August 28, 2018, against Joe Arpaio and Kelli Ward.

U.S. Representative Kyrsten Sinema easily secured the Democratic nomination.

Sinema defeated McSally by a slim margin; her victory became official only after six days of counting ballots.

Arizona Republican primary
Party	Candidate	Votes	%
Republican	Martha McSally	357,626	54.57
Republican	Kelli Ward	180,926	27.61
Republican	Joe Arpaio	116,555	17.79
Write-in		191	0.03
Total votes		655,298	100.00

Arizona Democratic primary
Party	Candidate	Votes	%
Democratic	Kyrsten Sinema	404,170	79.25
Democratic	Deedra Abboud	105,800	20.75
Total votes		509,970	100.00

Arizona general election
Party	Candidate	Votes	%	±%
Democratic	Kyrsten Sinema	1,191,100	49.96%	+3.76
Republican	Martha McSally	1,135,200	47.61%	–1.62
Green	Angela Green	57,442	2.41%	N/A
Write-in		566	0.02%	+0.01
Total votes		2,384,308	100.00%	
Democratic gain from Republican				

== California ==
California election
- Turnout: 56.42%
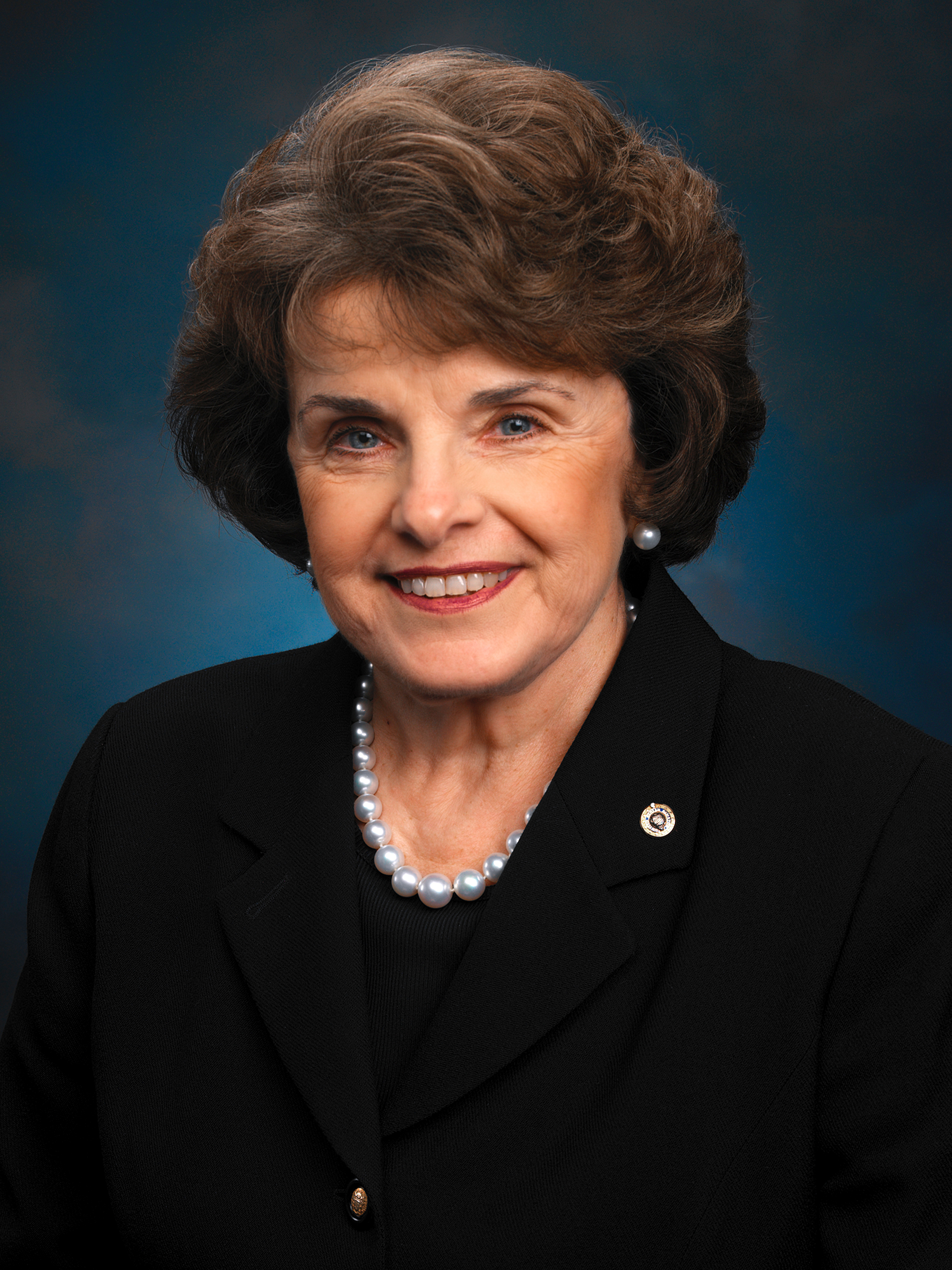

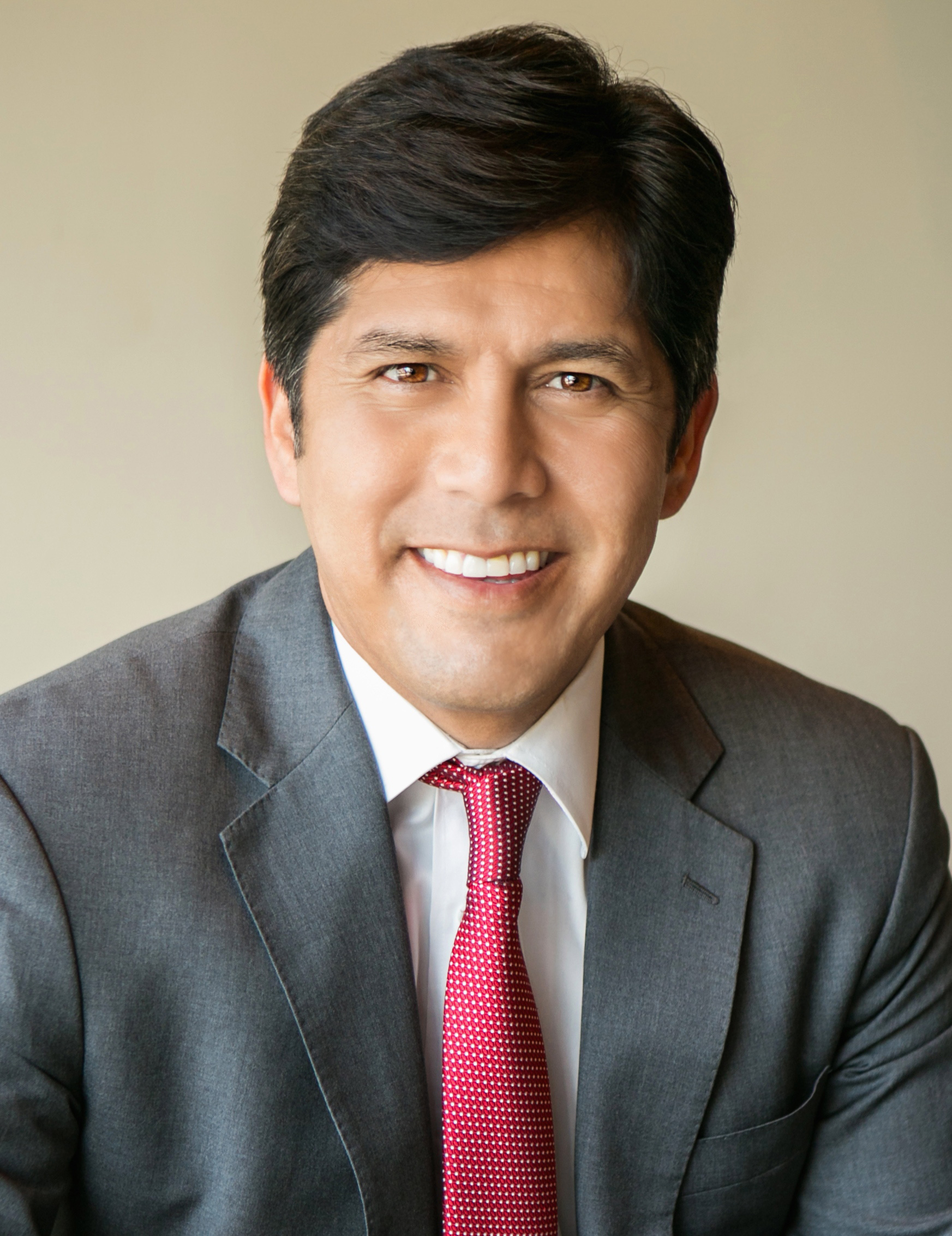
Nominee	Dianne Feinstein	Kevin de León
Party	Democratic	Democratic
Popular vote	6,019,422	5,093,942
Percentage	54.16%	45.84%
- County results Feinstein: 50–60% 60–70% de León: 50–60% 60–70% 70–80%
U.S. senator before election
Dianne Feinstein
Democratic
Elected U.S. senator
Dianne Feinstein
Democratic

Four-term Democrat Dianne Feinstein won a special election in 1992 and was elected to full terms in 1994, 2000, 2006, and 2012. She ran for re-election and advanced to the general election after securing the top spot in the June 5 jungle primary.

The June 5 primary ballot listed 32 candidates (Feinstein plus 31 challengers) in addition to 3 write-in candidates. There were 10 Democratic candidates, 11 Republican candidates, one Libertarian, one Peace and Freedom candidate, and 9 independent candidates. There was also a Green Party candidate who ran as a write-in.

President pro tempore of the California State Senate Kevin de León advanced to the general election for the right to challenge Feinstein after securing the second spot in the primary.

The 11 Republican candidates who ran in the primary combined for 33.2% of the vote. The top Republican candidate, James P. Bradley, received 8.3% of the vote, which put him in 3rd place at 3.8% behind the second-place finisher, Kevin DeLeon.

On November 6, Dianne Feinstein was elected to a fifth term, defeating Kevin de León.

California blanket primary
Party	Candidate	Votes	%
Democratic	Dianne Feinstein (incumbent)	2,947,035	44.18
Democratic	Kevin de León	805,446	12.07
Republican	James P. Bradley	556,252	8.34
Republican	Arun K. Bhumitra	350,815	5.26
Republican	Paul A. Taylor	323,534	4.85
Republican	Erin Cruz	267,494	4.01
Republican	Tom Palzer	205,183	3.08
Democratic	Alison Hartson	147,061	2.20
Republican	Rocky De La Fuente	135,279	2.03
Democratic	Pat Harris	126,947	1.90
Republican	John "Jack" Crew	93,808	1.41
Republican	Patrick Little	89,867	1.35
Republican	Kevin Mottus	87,646	1.31
Republican	Jerry Joseph Laws	67,140	1.01
Libertarian	Derrick Michael Reid	60,000	0.90
Democratic	Adrienne Nicole Edwards	56,172	0.84
Democratic	Douglas Howard Pierce	42,671	0.64
Republican	Mario Nabliba	39,209	0.59
Democratic	David Hildebrand	30,305	0.45
Democratic	Donnie O. Turner	30,101	0.45
Democratic	Herbert G. Peters	27,468	0.41
No party preference	David Moore	24,614	0.37
No party preference	Ling Ling Shi	23,506	0.35
Peace and Freedom	John Parker	22,825	0.34
No party preference	Lee Olson	20,393	0.31
Democratic	Gerald Plummer	18,234	0.27
No party preference	Jason M. Hanania	18,171	0.27
No party preference	Don J. Grundmann	15,125	0.23
No party preference	Colleen Shea Fernald	13,536	0.20
No party preference	Rash Bihari Ghosh	12,557	0.19
No party preference	Tim Gildersleeve	8,482	0.13
No party preference	Michael Fahmy Girgis	2,986	0.04
Write-in		863	0.01
Total votes		6,670,720	100.00

California general election
Party	Candidate	Votes	%	±%
Democratic	Dianne Feinstein (incumbent)	6,019,422	54.16%	–8.36
Democratic	Kevin de León	5,093,942	45.84%	N/A
Total votes		11,113,364	100.00%	
Democratic hold				

== Connecticut ==
Connecticut election
- Turnout: 63.58%
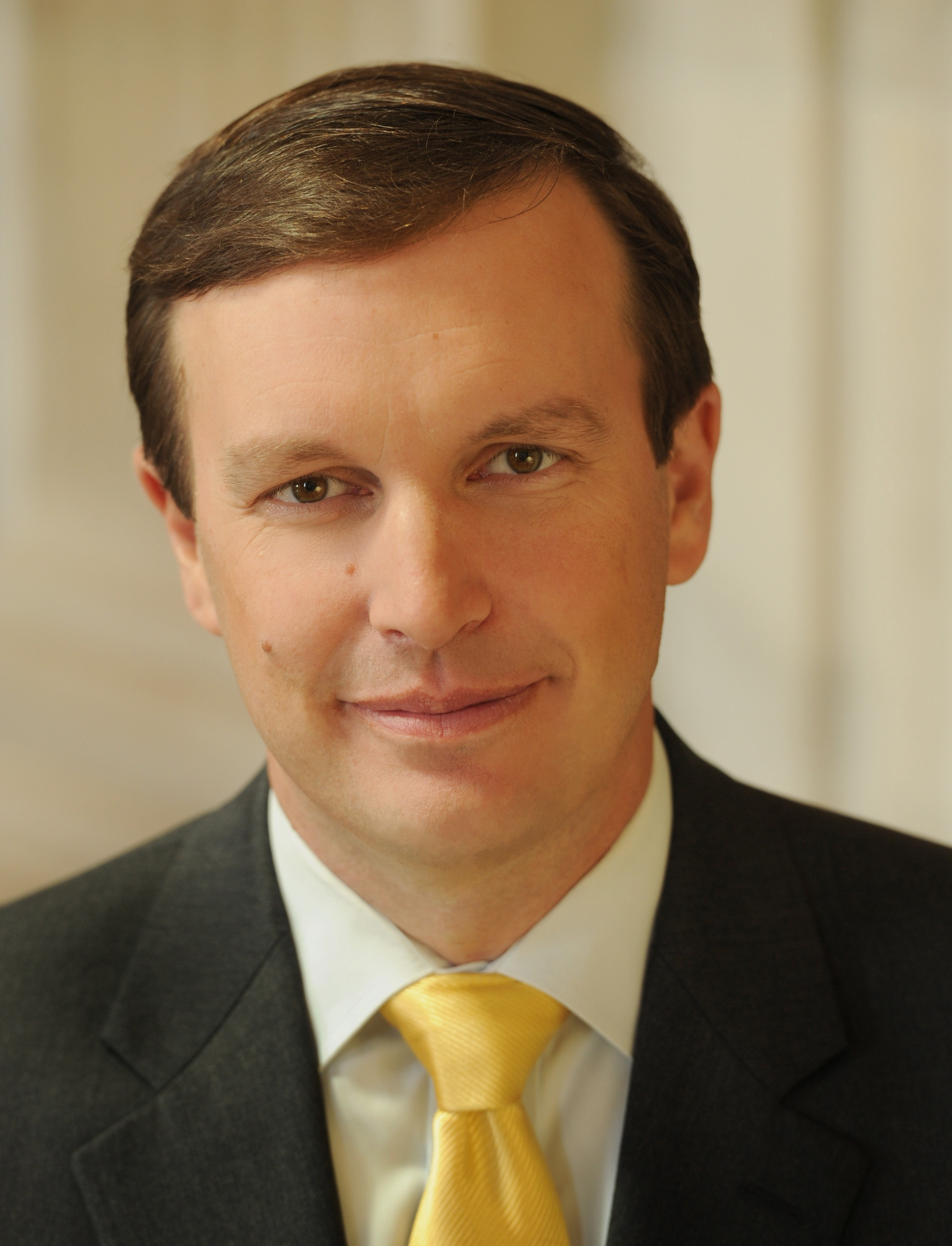
Nominee	Chris Murphy	Matthew Corey
Party	Democratic	Republican
Popular vote	825,579	545,717
Percentage	59.53%	39.35%
- Murphy: 40–50% 50–60% 60–70% 70–80% 80–90% >90% Corey: 40–50% 50–60% 60–70%
U.S. senator before election
Chris Murphy
Democratic
Elected U.S. senator
Chris Murphy
Democratic

One-term Democrat Chris Murphy was elected with 55% of the vote in 2012. He ran for re-election.

Businessmen Matthew Corey received the Republican nomination.

Chris Murphy was elected to a second term, winning nearly 60% of the vote.

Connecticut Republican primary
Party	Candidate	Votes	%
Republican	Matthew Corey	99,899	76.54
Republican	Dominic Rapini	30,624	23.46
Total votes		130,523	100.00

Connecticut general election
Party	Candidate	Votes	%	±%
Democratic	Chris Murphy (incumbent)	825,579	59.53%	+4.71
Republican	Matthew Corey	545,717	39.35%	–3.72
Libertarian	Richard Lion	8,838	0.64%	–1.02
Green	Jeff Russell	6,618	0.48%	N/A
Write-in		88	0.01%	–0.44
Total votes		1,386,840	100.00%	
Democratic hold				

== Delaware ==
Delaware election
- Turnout: 52.18%
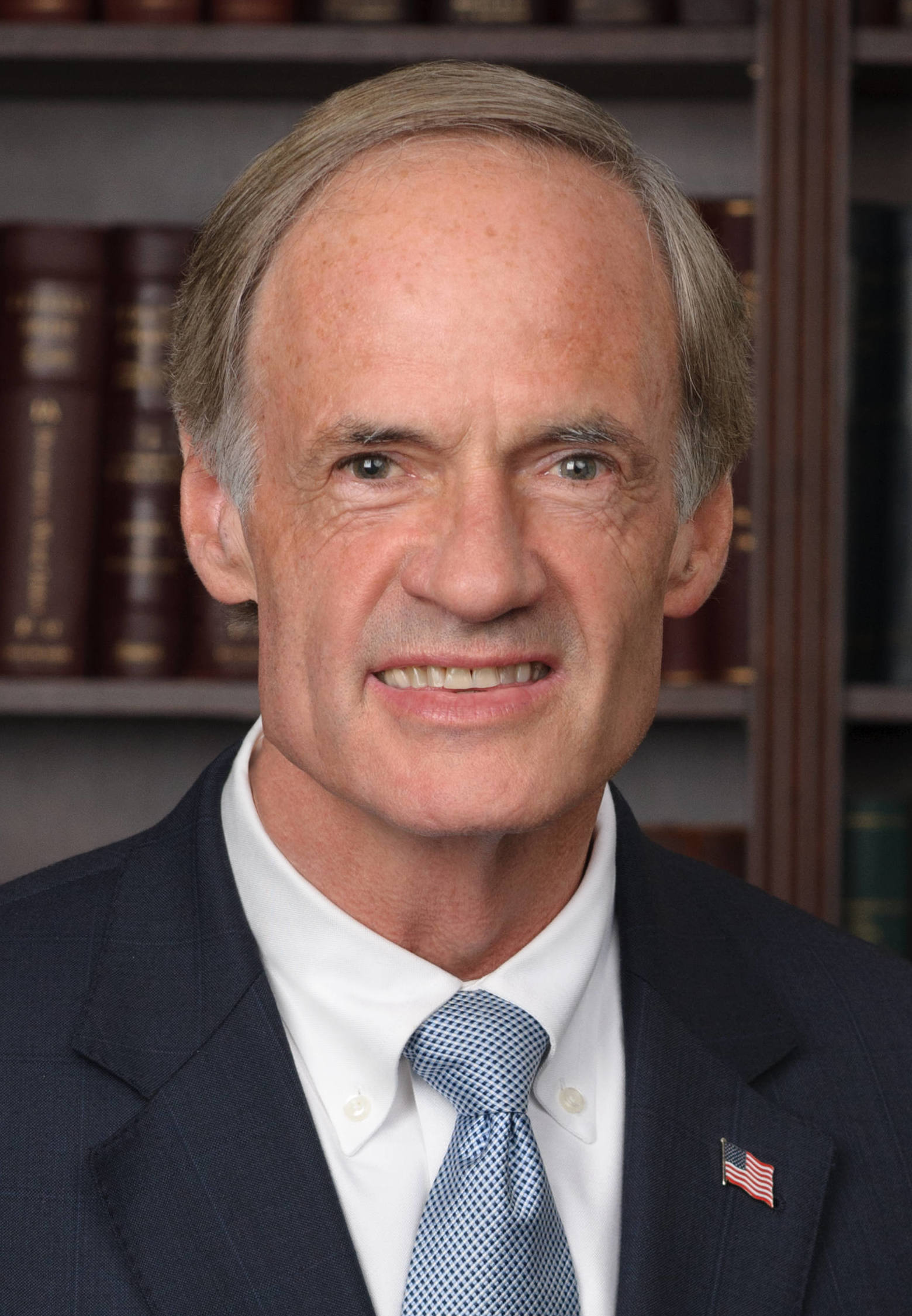

Nominee	Tom Carper	Rob Arlett
Party	Democratic	Republican
Popular vote	217,385	137,127
Percentage	59.95%	37.81%
- Carper: 50–60% 60–70% Arlett: 50–60%
U.S. senator before election
Tom Carper
Democratic
Elected U.S. senator
Tom Carper
Democratic

Three-term Democrat Tom Carper won re-election with 66% of the vote in 2012. He announced he was running for re-election during an interview on MSNBC on July 24, 2017. He defeated Dover community activist Kerri Evelyn Harris for the Democratic nomination. Sussex County Councilman Robert Arlett won the Republican nomination.

Tom Carper defeated Arlett, winning 60% of the vote.

Delaware Democratic primary
Party	Candidate	Votes	%
Democratic	Tom Carper (incumbent)	53,635	64.59
Democratic	Kerri Evelyn Harris	29,407	35.41
Total votes		83,042	100.00

Delaware Republican primary
Party	Candidate	Votes	%
Republican	Rob Arlett	25,284	66.77
Republican	Gene Truono	10,587	27.96
Republican	Rocky De La Fuente	1,998	5.28
Total votes		37,870	100.00

Delaware general election
Party	Candidate	Votes	%	±%
Democratic	Tom Carper (incumbent)	217,385	59.95%	–6.47
Republican	Rob Arlett	137,127	37.82%	+8.87
Green	Demitri Theodoropoulos	4,170	1.15%	+0.35
Libertarian	Nadine Frost	3,910	1.08%	N/A
Write-in		14	0.00%	N/A
Total votes		362,606	100.00%	
Democratic hold				

== Florida ==
Florida election
- Turnout: 61.68%
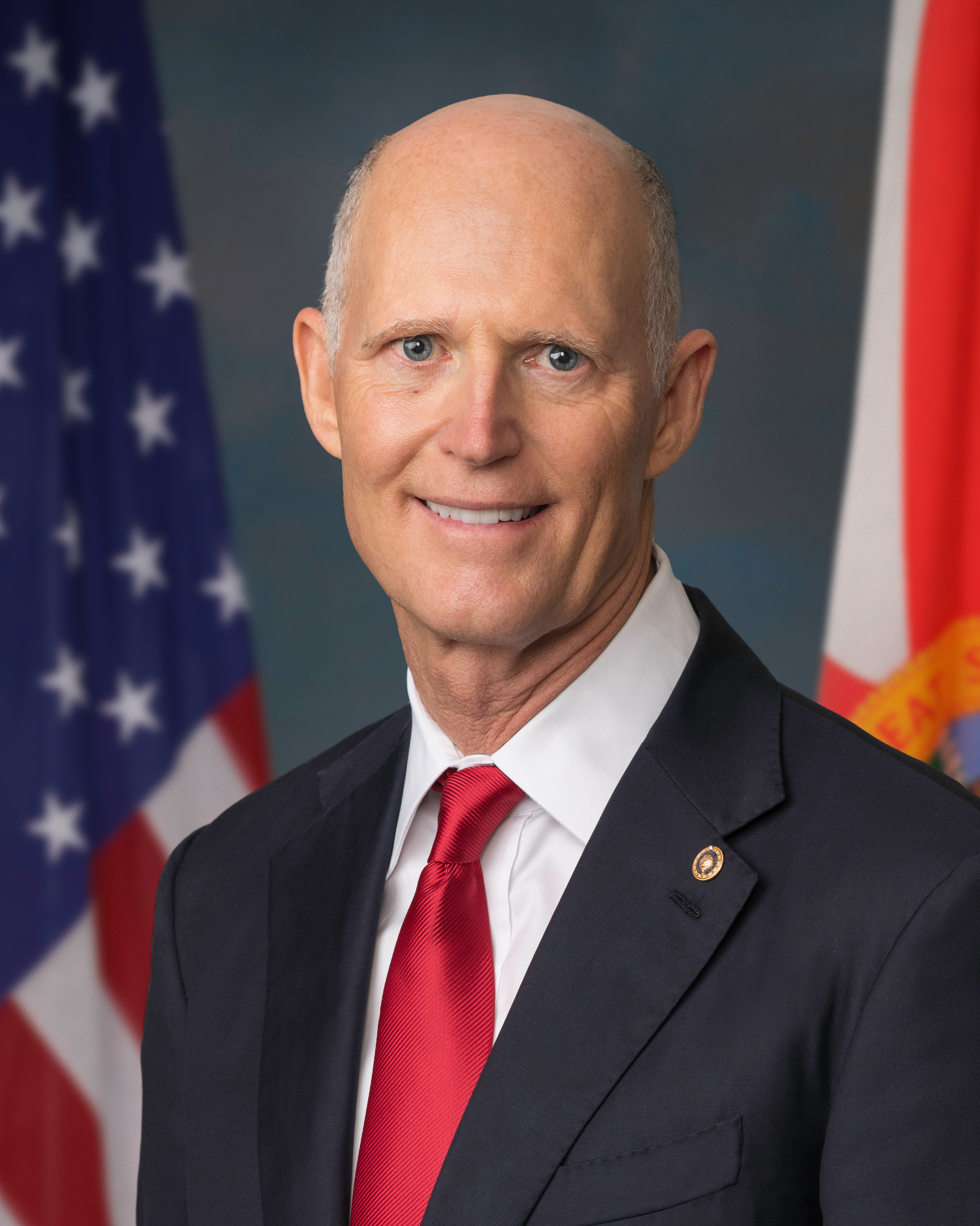

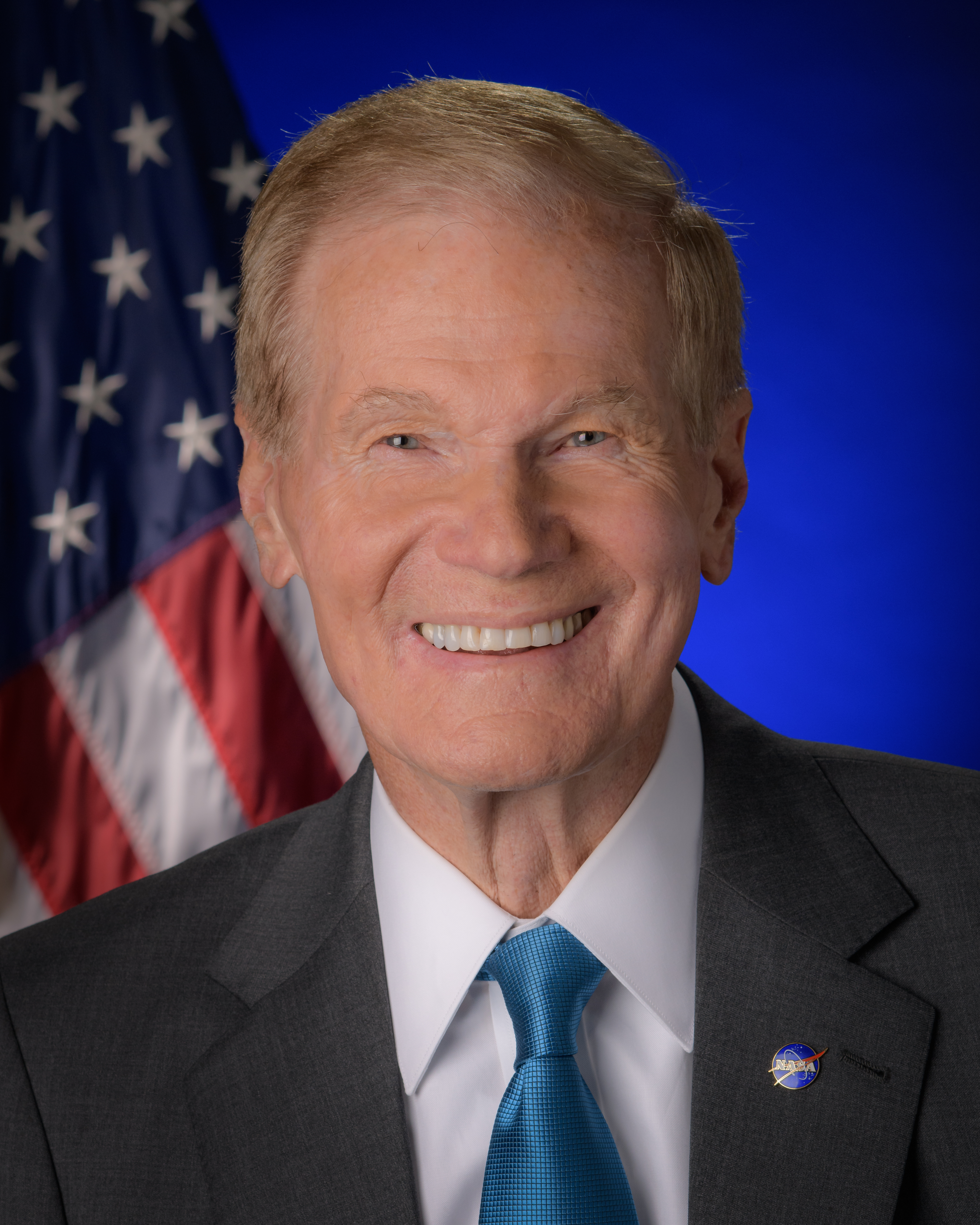
Nominee	Rick Scott	Bill Nelson
Party	Republican	Democratic
Popular vote	4,099,505	4,089,472
Percentage	50.05%	49.93%
- Scott: 50–60% 60–70% 70–80% 80–90% Nelson: 50–60% 60–70%
U.S. senator before election
Bill Nelson
Democratic
Elected U.S. senator
Rick Scott
Republican

Three-term Democrat Bill Nelson was re-elected with 55% of the vote in 2012. He sought re-election to a fourth term in office.

Florida Governor Rick Scott won the Republican nomination. First elected in 2010 and re-elected in 2014, Scott's term as Governor of Florida was set to end by January 2019, due to term limits.

Edward Janowski was running as an independent, but did not qualify.

Scott led among ballots tallied on election night, but given the close margins of the race recounts were ordered. Final recount numbers were released following a machine and hand recount with Rick Scott maintaining a lead. On November 18, Nelson conceded to Scott. Two days later, election results were certified by the state, cementing Scott's win.

Florida Republican primary
Party	Candidate	Votes	%
Republican	Rick Scott	1,456,187	88.61
Republican	Rocky De La Fuente	187,209	11.39
Total votes		1,643,396	100.00

Florida general election
Party	Candidate	Votes	%	±%
Republican	Rick Scott	4,099,505	50.05%	+7.82
Democratic	Bill Nelson (incumbent)	4,089,472	49.93%	–5.30
Write-in		1,028	0.01%	+0.01
Total votes		8,190,005	100.00%	
Republican gain from Democratic				

== Hawaii ==
Hawaii election
- Turnout: 51.32%
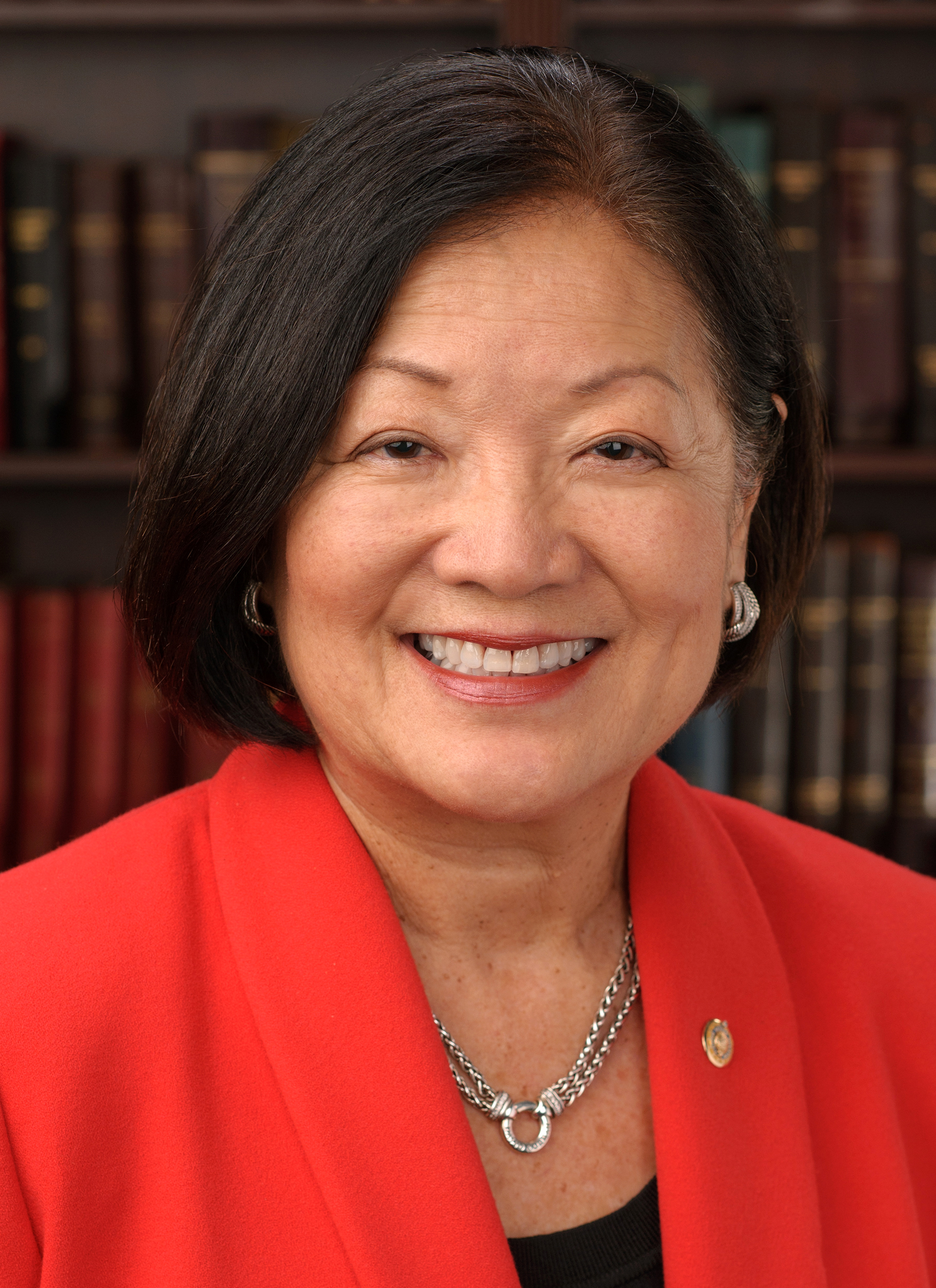

Nominee	Mazie Hirono	Ron Curtis
Party	Democratic	Republican
Popular vote	276,316	112,035
Percentage	71.15%	28.85%
- County results Hirono: 60–70% 70–80%
U.S. senator before election
Mazie Hirono
Democratic
Elected U.S. senator
Mazie Hirono
Democratic

One-term Democrat Mazie Hirono was elected with 63% of the vote in 2012. She ran for reelection.

Ron Curtis was the Republican nominee.

Hirono was elected to a second term by a landslide.

Hawaii Democratic primary
Party	Candidate	Votes	%
Democratic	Mazie Hirono (incumbent)	201,679	100.00
Total votes		201,679	100.00

Hawaii Republican primary
Party	Candidate	Votes	%
Republican	Ron Curtis	6,370	23.73
Republican	Consuelo Anderson	5,172	19.26
Republican	Robert C. Helsham Sr.	3,988	14.85
Republican	Thomas E. White	3,661	13.64
Republican	Rocky De La Fuente	3,065	11.42
Republican	George L. Berish	1,658	6.18
Republican	Michael R. Hodgkiss	1,576	5.87
Republican	Eddie Pirkowski	1,358	5.06
Total votes		26,848	100.00

Hawaii general election
Party	Candidate	Votes	%	±%
Democratic	Mazie Hirono (incumbent)	276,316	71.15%	+8.55
Republican	Ron Curtis	112,035	28.85%	–8.55
Total votes		388,351	100.00%	
Democratic hold				

== Indiana ==
Indiana election
- Turnout: 50.42%
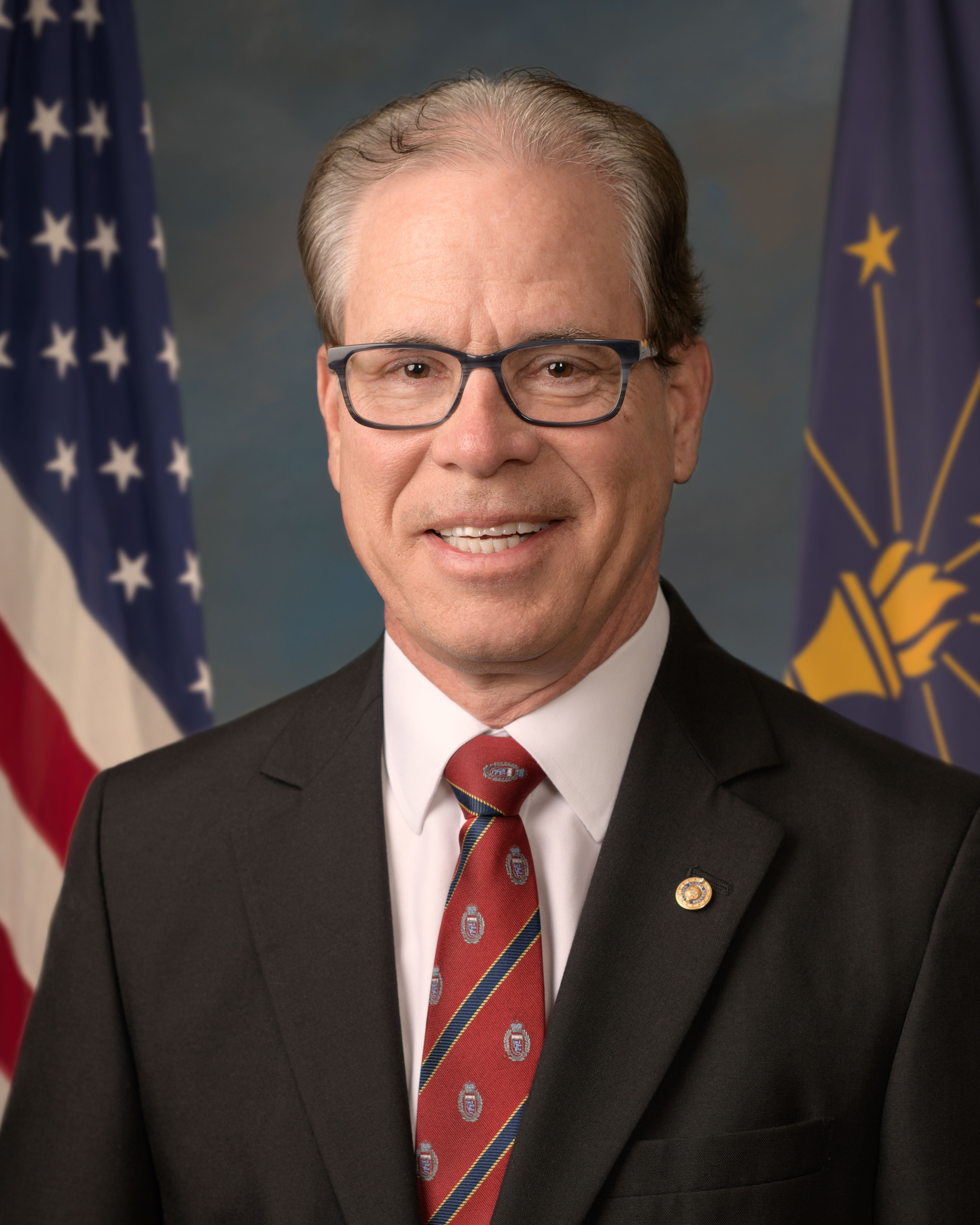

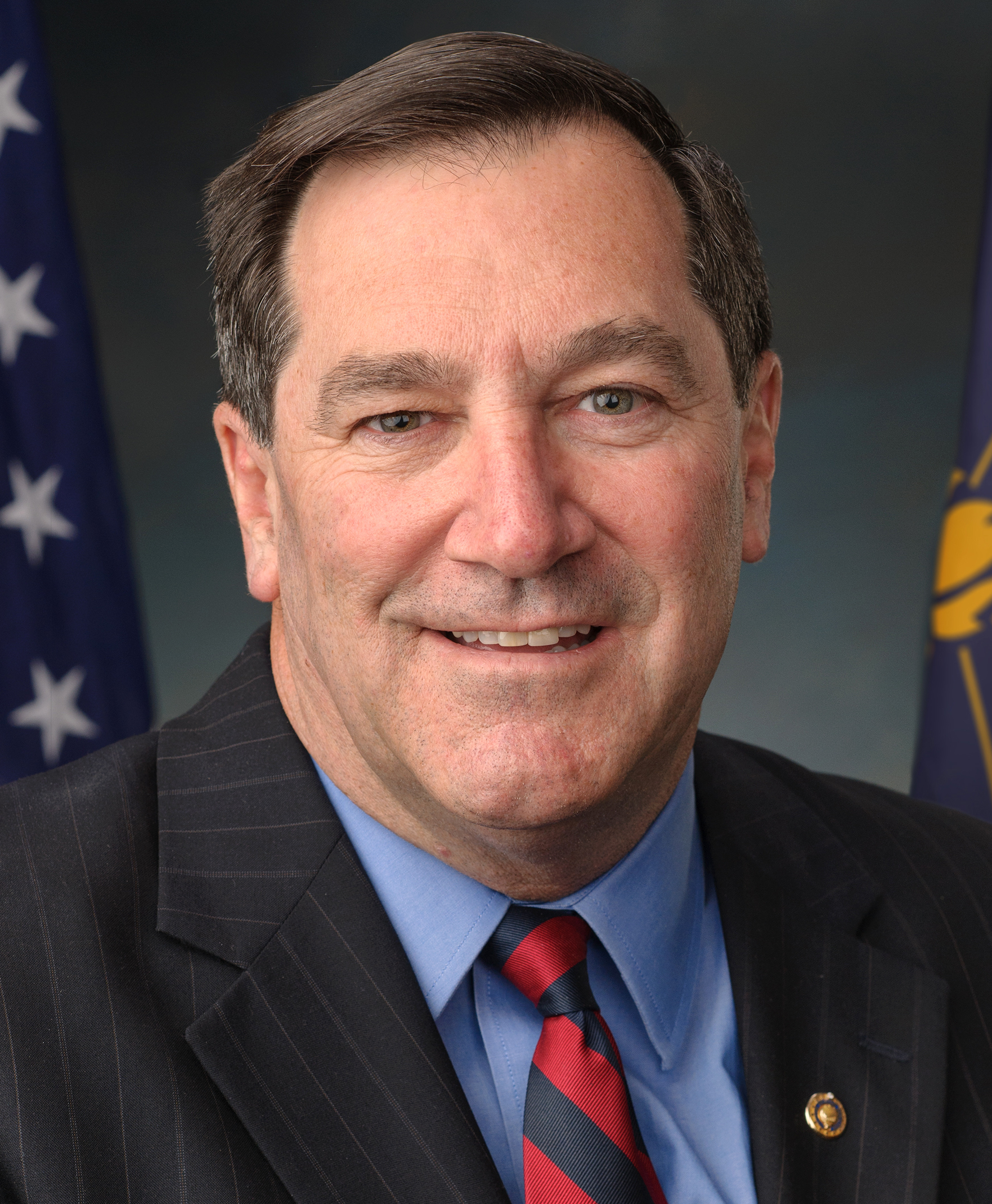
Nominee	Mike Braun	Joe Donnelly
Party	Republican	Democratic
Popular vote	1,158,000	1,023,553
Percentage	50.73%	44.84%
- County results Braun: 40–50% 50–60% 60–70% 70–80% Donnelly: 40–50% 50–60% 60–70%
U.S. senator before election
Joe Donnelly
Democratic
Elected U.S. senator
Mike Braun
Republican

One-term Democrat Joe Donnelly was elected with 50.04% of the vote in 2012. He ran for reelection. He won the Democratic primary unopposed.

State Representative Mike Braun won the May 8 Republican primary. U.S. Representatives Luke Messer and Todd Rokita also ran for the Republican nomination.

James Johnson ran as an independent.

Braun won the election with 51% of the vote, defeating Joe Donnelly.

Indiana Democratic primary
Party	Candidate	Votes	%
Democratic	Joe Donnelly (incumbent)	284,621	100.00
Total votes		284,621	100.00

Indiana Republican primary
Party	Candidate	Votes	%
Republican	Mike Braun	208,602	41.17
Republican	Todd Rokita	151,967	29.99
Republican	Luke Messer	146,131	28.84
Total votes		506,700	100.00

Indiana general election
Party	Candidate	Votes	%	±%
Republican	Mike Braun	1,158,000	50.73%	+6.45
Democratic	Joe Donnelly (incumbent)	1,023,553	44.84%	–5.20
Libertarian	Lucy Brenton	100,942	4.42%	–1.26
Write-in		70	0.00%	N/A
Total votes		2,282,565	100.00%	
Republican gain from Democratic				

== Maine ==
Maine election
- Turnout: 59.96%
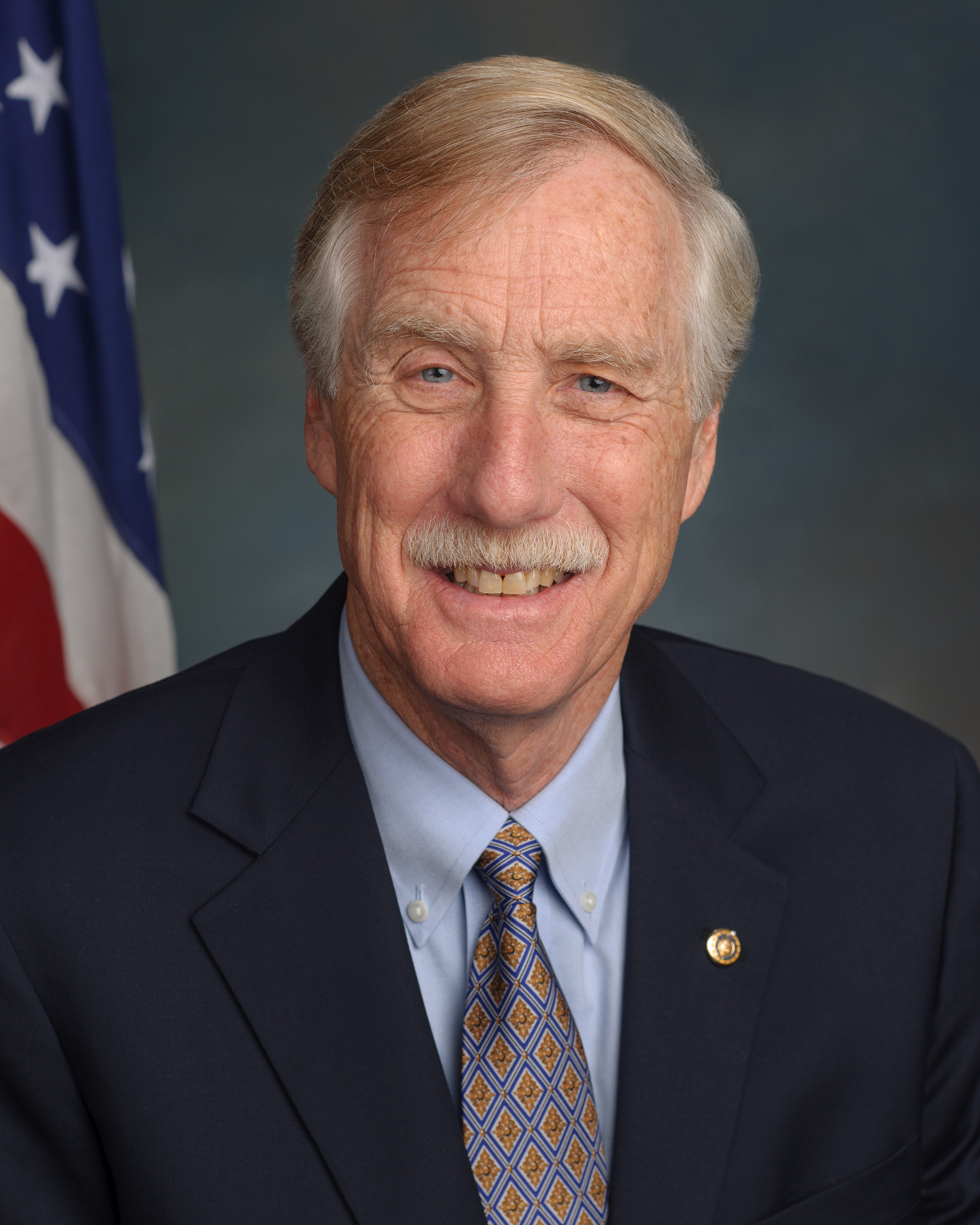

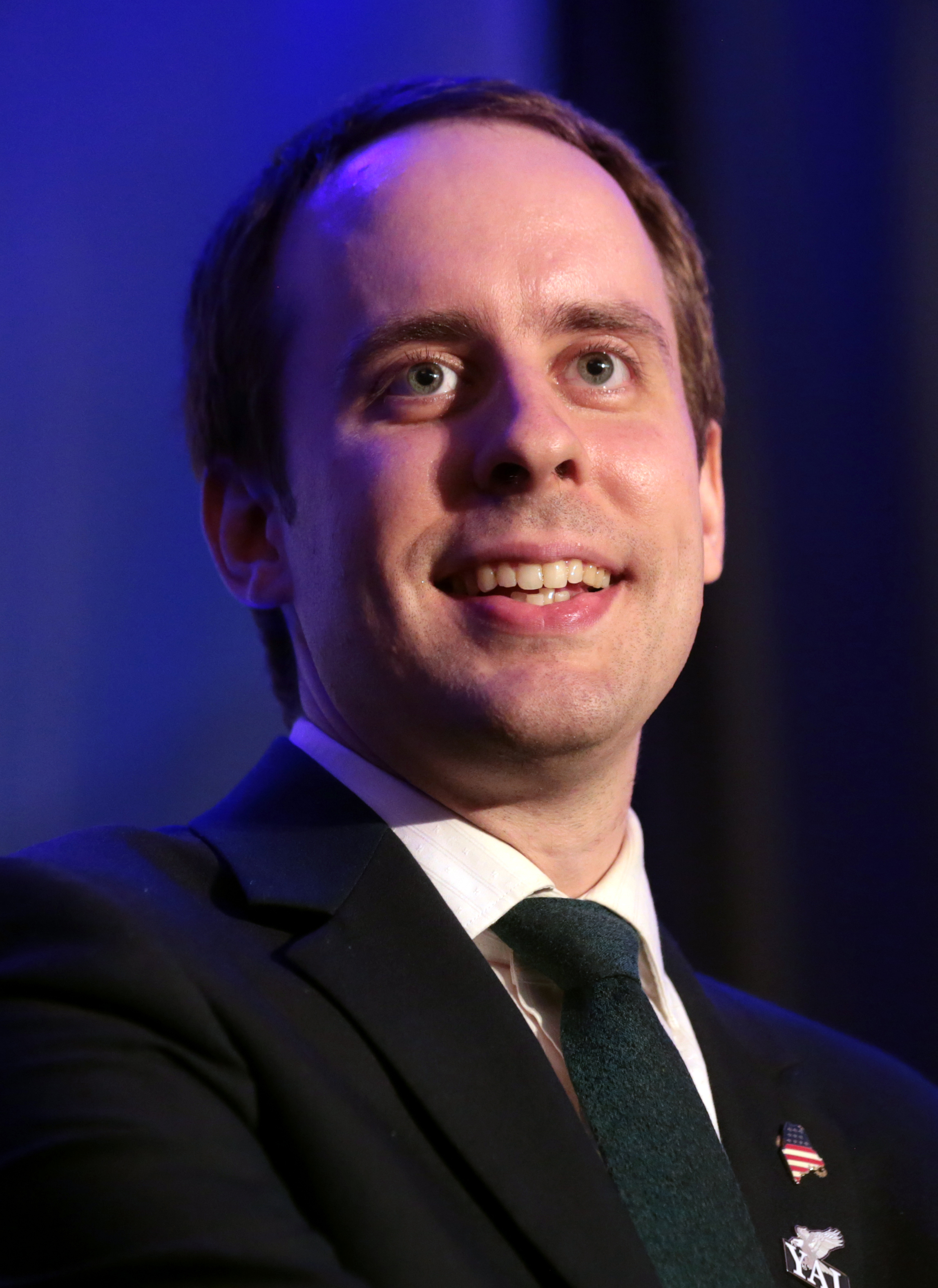

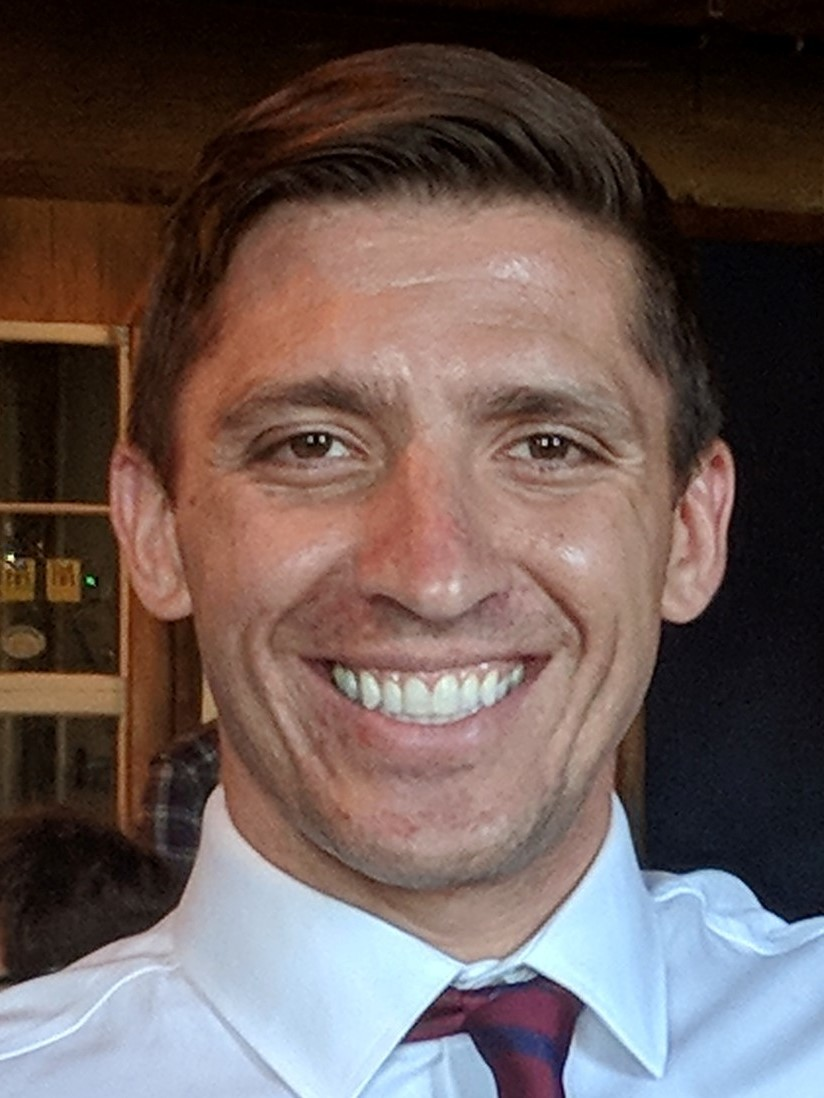
Nominee	Angus King	Eric Brakey	Zak Ringelstein
Party	Independent	Republican	Democratic
Popular vote	344,575	223,502	66,268
Percentage	54.31%	35.23%	10.45%
- King: 40–50% 50–60% 60–70% 70–80% 80–90% >90% Brakey: 40–50% 50–60% 60–70% 70–80% 80–90% >90% Tie
U.S. senator before election
Angus King
Independent
Elected U.S. senator
Angus King
Independent

One-term Independent Senator Angus King was elected in a three-way race with 53% of the vote in 2012. King has caucused with the Democratic Party since taking office in 2013, but he has left open the possibility of caucusing with the Republican Party in the future.

State Senator Eric Brakey ran unopposed for the Republican nomination.

Public school teacher and founder of UClass Zak Ringelstein ran unopposed for the Democratic nomination.

The election was conducted with ranked choice voting, as opposed to "First-past-the-post voting", after Maine voters passed a citizen referendum approving the change in 2016 and a June 2018 referendum sustaining the change.

King was easily re-elected with over 50% of the vote.

Maine Democratic primary
Party	Candidate	Votes	%
Democratic	Zak Ringelstein	89,841	100.00
Total votes		89,841	100.00

Maine Republican primary
Party	Candidate	Votes	%
Republican	Eric Brakey	59,853	100.00
Total votes		59,853	100.00

Maine general election
Party	Candidate	Votes	%	±%
Independent	Angus King (incumbent)	344,575	54.31%	+1.42
Republican	Eric Brakey	223,502	35.23%	+4.48
Democratic	Zak Ringelstein	66,268	10.45%	–2.81
Write-in		64	0.01%	N/A
Total votes		634,409	100.00%	
Independent hold				

== Maryland ==
Maryland election
- Turnout: 58.17%
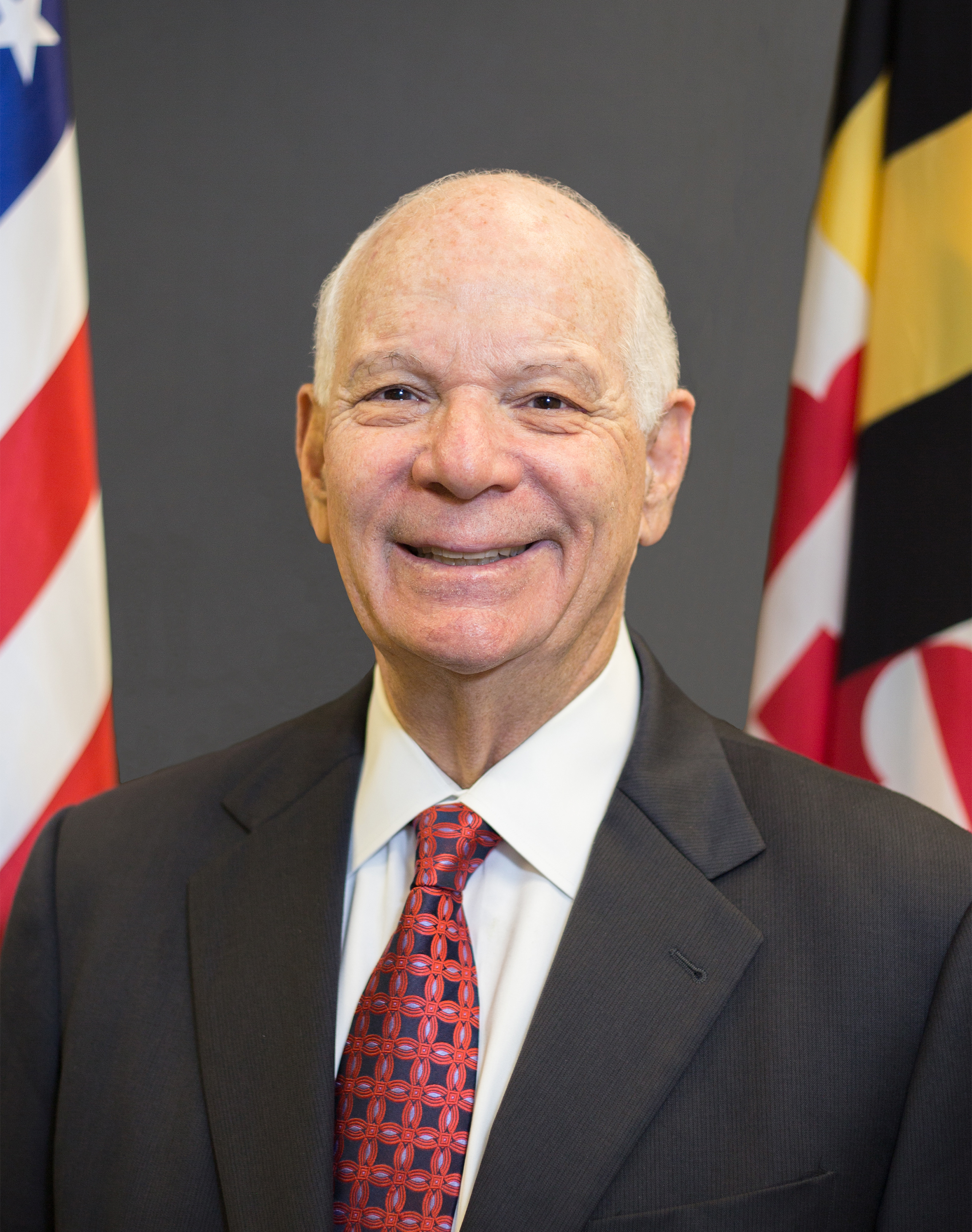

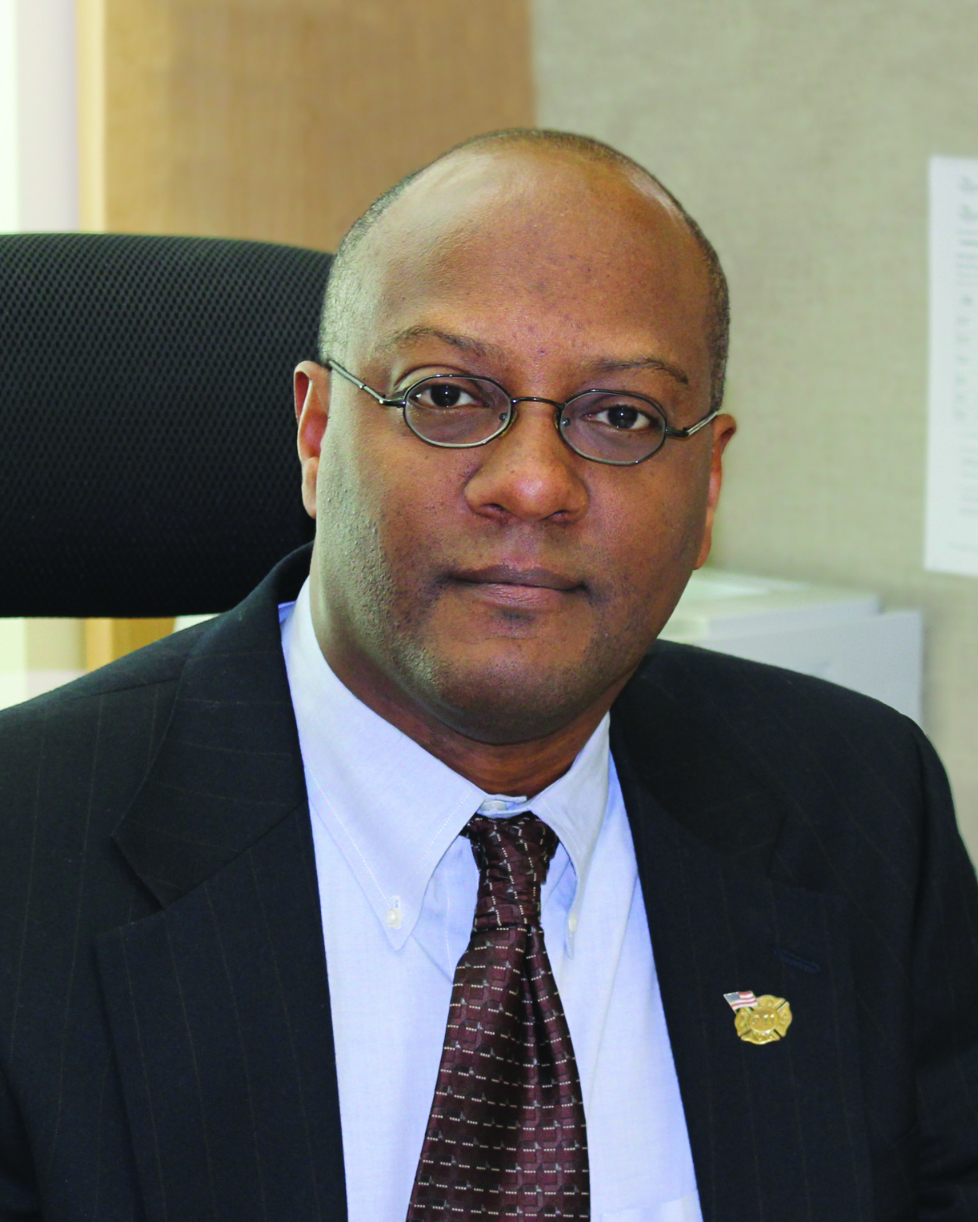
Nominee	Ben Cardin	Tony Campbell
Party	Democratic	Republican
Popular vote	1,491,614	697,107
Percentage	64.86%	30.31%
- Cardin: 40–50% 50–60% 60–70% 70–80% 80–90% >90% Campbell: 50–60% 70–80%
U.S. senator before election
Ben Cardin
Democratic
Elected U.S. senator
Ben Cardin
Democratic

Two-term Democrat Ben Cardin was re-elected with 56% of the vote in 2012. He won the Democratic primary.

Tony Campbell, Evan Cronhardt, Nnabu Eze, Gerald Smith, and Blaine Taylor were seeking the Republican nomination, with Campbell winning.

Arvin Vohra, vice chairman of the Libertarian National Committee, sought the Libertarian Party nomination.

Independents Neal Simon and Edward Shlikas, and Michael B Puskar ran.

Cardin won re-election to a third term in office.

Maryland Democratic primary
Party	Candidate	Votes	%
Democratic	Ben Cardin (incumbent)	477,441	80.28
Democratic	Chelsea Manning	34,611	5.82
Democratic	Jerome Segal	20,027	3.37
Democratic	Debbie Wilson	18,953	3.19
Democratic	Marcia H. Morgan	16,047	2.70
Democratic	Lih Young	9,874	1.66
Democratic	Richard Vaughn	9,480	1.59
Democratic	Erik Jetmir	8,259	1.39
Total votes		594,692	100.00

Maryland Republican primary
Party	Candidate	Votes	%
Republican	Tony Campbell	51,426	29.22
Republican	Chris Chaffee	42,328	24.05
Republican	Christina J. Grigorian	30,756	17.48
Republican	John Graziani	15,435	8.77
Republican	Blaine Taylor	8,848	5.03
Republican	Gerald I. Smith Jr.	7,564	4.30
Republican	Brian Charles Vaeth	5,411	3.07
Republican	Evan M. Cronhardt	4,445	2.53
Republican	Bill Krehnbrink	3,606	2.05
Republican	Nnabu Eze	3,442	1.96
Republican	Albert Binyahmin Howard	2,720	1.55
Total votes		175,981	100.00

Maryland general election
Party	Candidate	Votes	%	±%
Democratic	Ben Cardin (incumbent)	1,491,614	64.86%	+8.88
Republican	Tony Campbell	697,017	30.31%	+3.98
Independent	Neal Simon	85,964	3.74%	N/A
Libertarian	Arvin Vohra	22,943	1.00%	–0.22
Write-in		2,351	0.10%	±0.00
Total votes		2,299,889	100.00%	
Democratic hold				

== Massachusetts ==
Massachusetts election
- Turnout: 59.17%
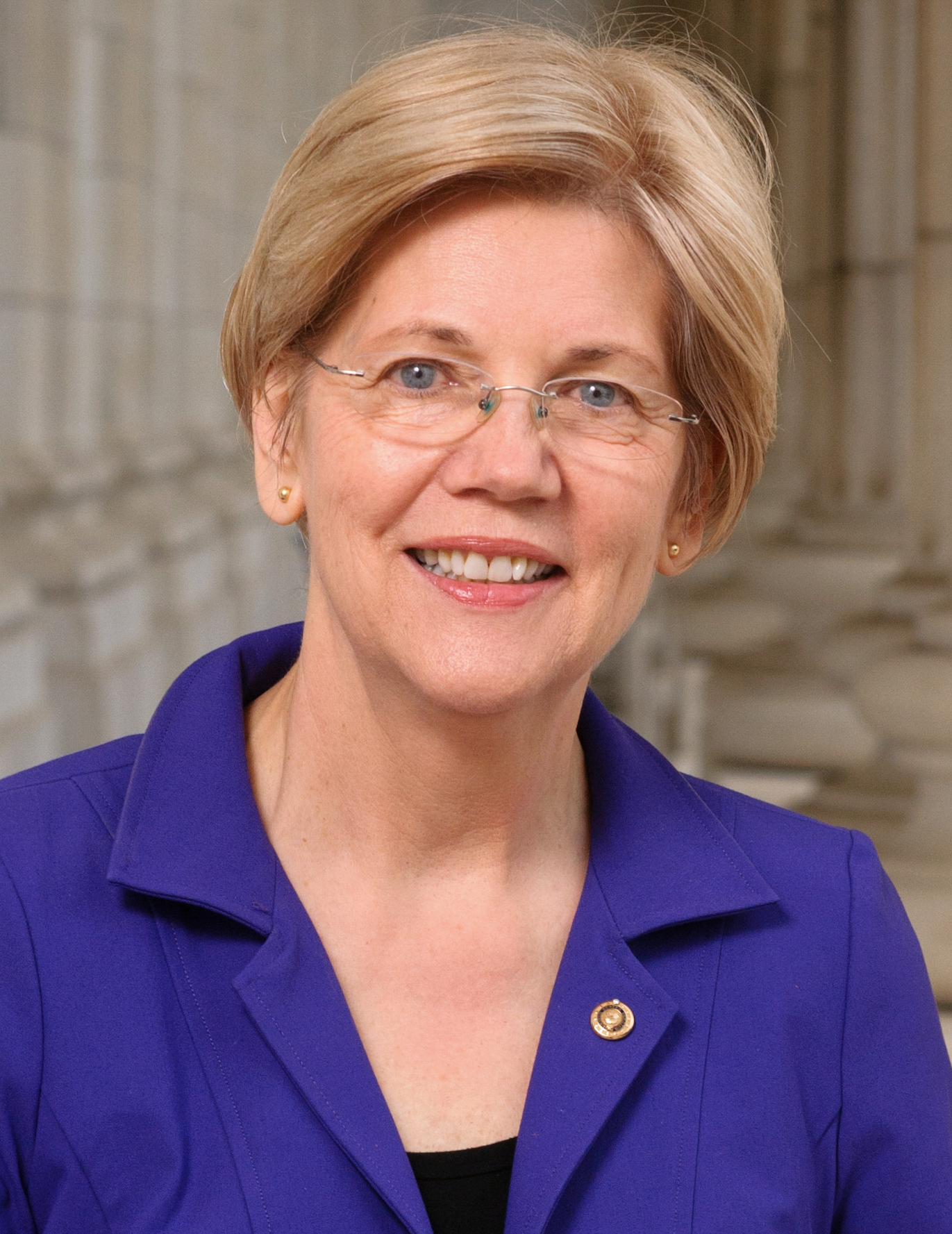

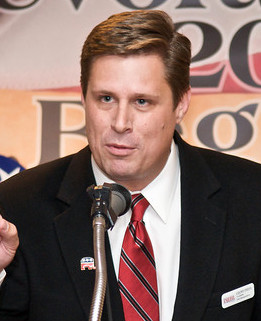
Nominee	Elizabeth Warren	Geoff Diehl
Party	Democratic	Republican
Popular vote	1,633,371	979,210
Percentage	60.34%	36.17%
- Warren: 40–50% 50–60% 60–70% 70–80% 80–90% >90% Diehl: 40–50% 50–60% 60–70%
U.S. senator before election
Elizabeth Warren
Democratic
Elected U.S. senator
Elizabeth Warren
Democratic

One-term Democrat Elizabeth Warren was elected with 54% of the vote in 2012. She ran for re-election.

State Representative Geoff Diehl, attorney and founder of Better for America, John Kingston and former Romney aide Beth Lindstrom, ran for the Republican nomination. Diehl won the Republican nomination.

Shiva Ayyadurai ran as an independent. Shiva started as in early 2017 as the first Republican in the race, but went independent in November 2017.

Warren defeated Diehl, winning a second term.

Massachusetts Democratic primary
Party	Candidate	Votes	%
Democratic	Elizabeth Warren (incumbent)	590,835	98.08
Write-in		11,558	1.92
Total votes		602,393	100.00

Massachusetts Republican primary
Party	Candidate	Votes	%
Republican	Geoff Diehl	144,043	55.15
Republican	John Kingston III	69,636	26.66
Republican	Beth Joyce Lindstrom	46,693	17.88
Write-in		798	0.31
Total votes		261,170	100.00

Massachusetts general election
Party	Candidate	Votes	%	±%
Democratic	Elizabeth Warren (incumbent)	1,633,371	60.34%	+6.60
Republican	Geoff Diehl	979,210	36.17%	–10.02
Independent	Shiva Ayyadurai	91,710	3.39%	N/A
Write-in		2,799	0.10%	+0.03
Total votes		2,707,090	100.00%	
Democratic hold				

== Michigan ==
Michigan election
- Turnout: 56.72%
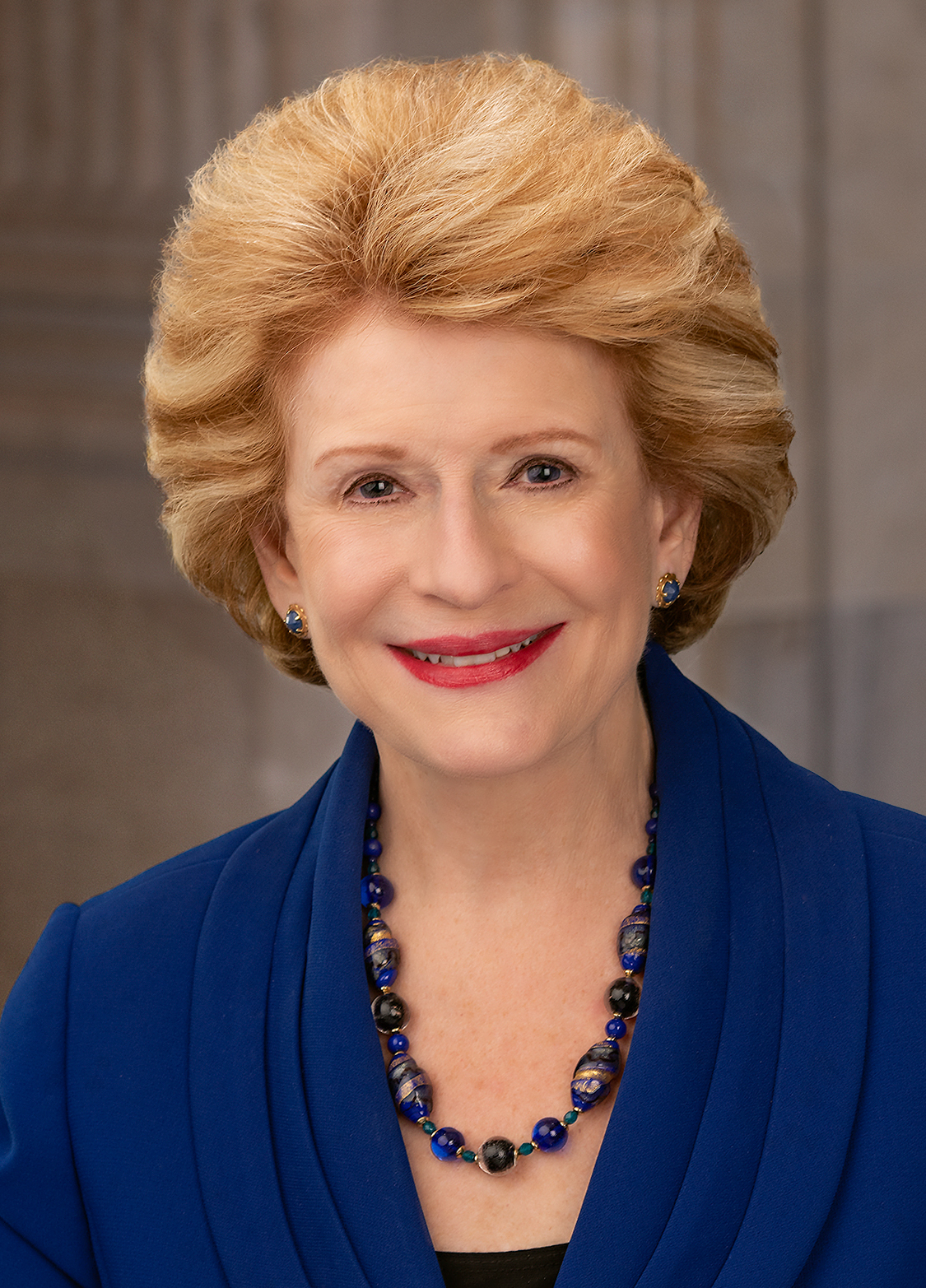

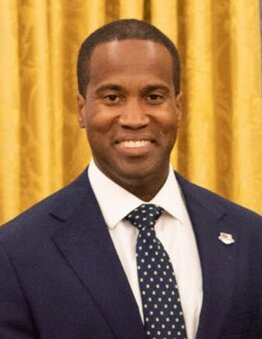
Nominee	Debbie Stabenow	John James
Party	Democratic	Republican
Popular vote	2,214,478	1,938,818
Percentage	52.26%	45.76%
- Stabenow: 40-50% 50–60% 60–70% 70–80% James: 40–50% 50–60% 60–70% 70–80%
U.S. senator before election
Debbie Stabenow
Democratic
Elected U.S. senator
Debbie Stabenow
Democratic

Three-term Democrat Debbie Stabenow was re-elected with 59% of the vote in 2012. She was renominated without Democratic opposition. On the Republican side, businessman John James won the nomination.

In the final months of the election, polls showed the race was beginning to narrow. Ultimately, Stabenow was re-elected, defeating James, with a majority of the vote.

Michigan Democratic primary
Party	Candidate	Votes	%
Democratic	Debbie Stabenow (incumbent)	1,045,450	100.00
Total votes		1,045,450	100.00

Michigan Republican primary
Party	Candidate	Votes	%
Republican	John James	518,564	54.67
Republican	Sandy Pensler	429,885	45.32
Write-in		57	0.01
Total votes		948,506	100.00

Michigan general election
Party	Candidate	Votes	%	±%
Democratic	Debbie Stabenow (incumbent)	2,214,478	52.26%	–6.54
Republican	John James	1,938,818	45.76%	+7.78
Green	Marcia Squier	40,204	0.95%	+0.35
U.S. Taxpayers'	George Huffman III	27,251	0.64%	+0.08
Natural Law	John Howard Wilhelm	16,502	0.39%	+0.15
Write-in		18	0.00%	±0.00
Total votes		4,237,271	100.00%	
Democratic hold				

== Minnesota ==
=== Minnesota (regular) ===
Minnesota general election
- Turnout: 63.89%
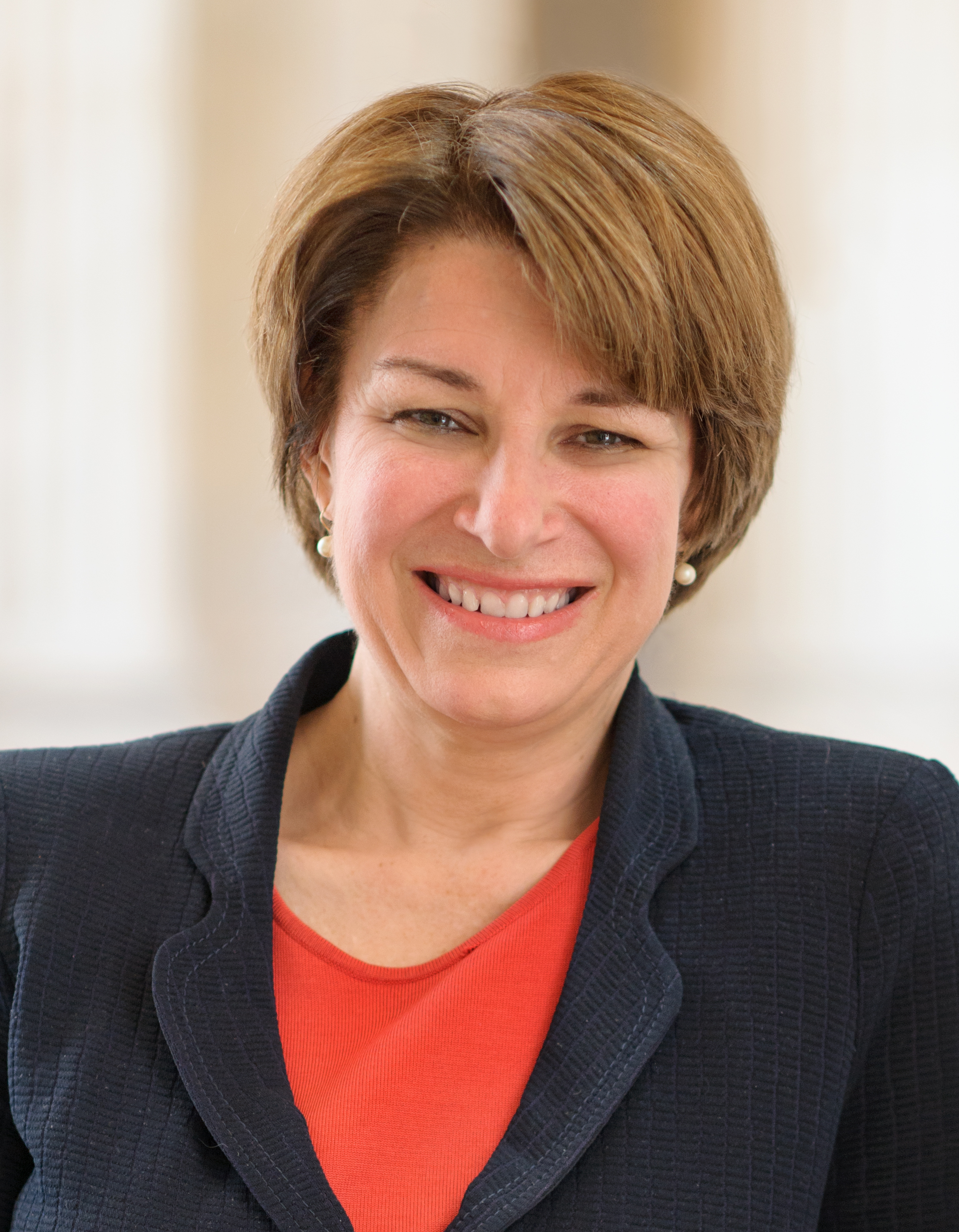

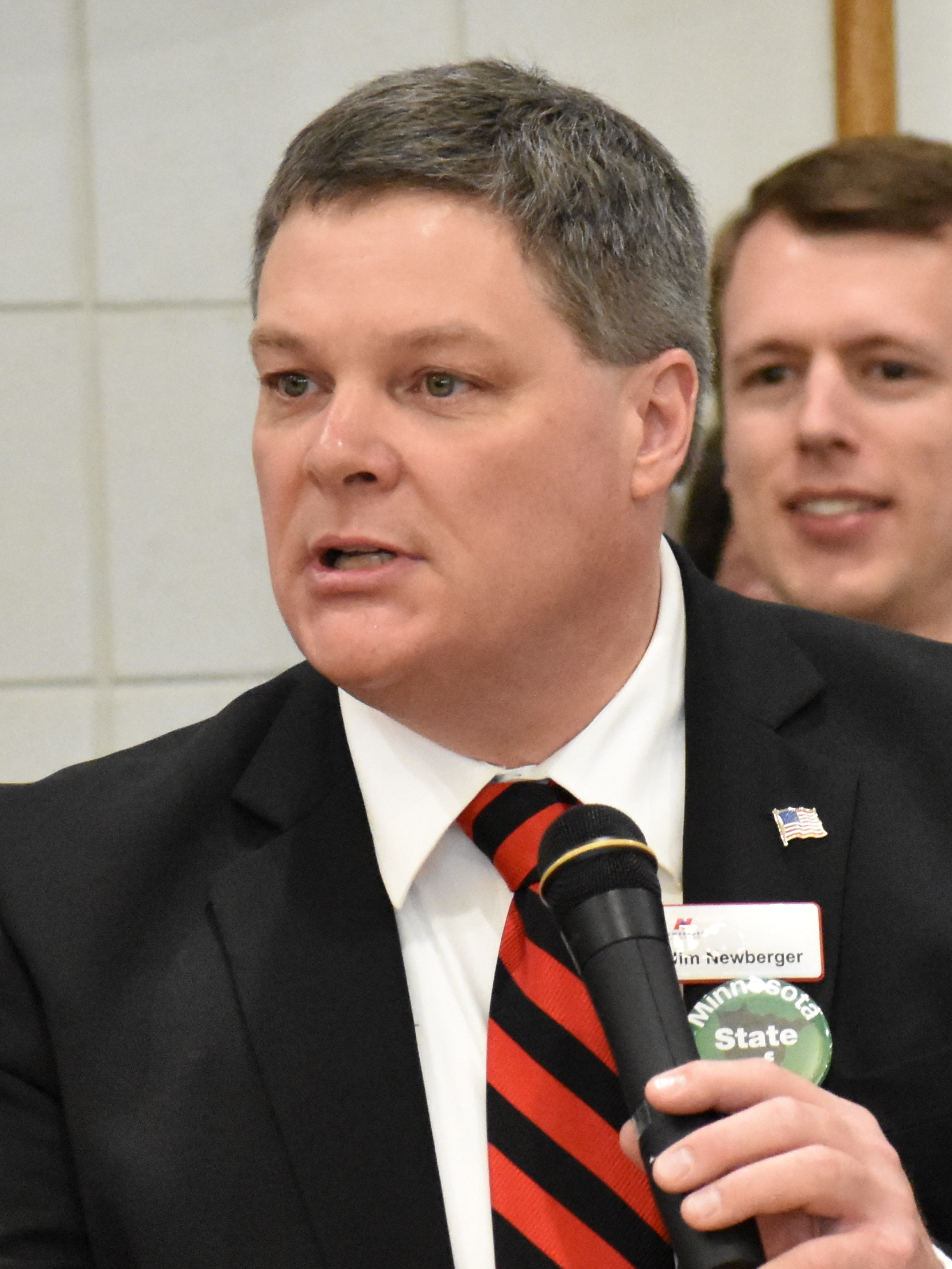
Nominee	Amy Klobuchar	Jim Newberger
Party	Democratic (DFL)	Republican
Popular vote	1,566,174	940,437
Percentage	60.31%	36.21%
- Klobuchar: 40–50% 50–60% 60–70% 70–80% Newberger: 40–50% 50–60% 60–70%
U.S. senator before election
Amy Klobuchar
Democratic (DFL)
Elected U.S. senator
Amy Klobuchar
Democratic (DFL)

Two-term Democrat Amy Klobuchar was re-elected with 65% of the vote in 2012. She ran for re-election.

State Representative Jim Newberger ran for the Republican nomination.

Klobuchar was easily re-elected.

Minnesota Democratic (DFL) primary
Party	Candidate	Votes	%
Democratic (DFL)	Amy Klobuchar (incumbent)	557,306	95.70
Democratic (DFL)	Steve Carlson	9,934	1.71
Democratic (DFL)	Stephen A. Emery	7,047	1.21
Democratic (DFL)	David Robert Groves	4,511	0.77
Democratic (DFL)	Leonard J. Richards	3,552	0.61
Total votes		582,350	100.00

Minnesota Republican primary
Party	Candidate	Votes	%
Republican	Jim Newberger	201,531	69.50
Republican	Merrill Anderson	45,492	15.69
Republican	Rae Hart Anderon	25,883	8.93
Republican	Rocky De La Fuente	17,051	5.88
Total votes		289,957	100.00

Minnesota general election
Party	Candidate	Votes	%	±%
Democratic (DFL)	Amy Klobuchar (incumbent)	1,566,174	60.31%	–4.92
Republican	Jim Newberger	940,437	36.21%	+5.68
Legal Marijuana Now	Dennis Schuller	66,236	2.55%	N/A
Green	Paula M. Overby	23,101	0.89%	N/A
Write-in		931	0.04%	–0.05
Total votes		2,596,879	100.00%	
Democratic (DFL) hold				

=== Minnesota (special) ===
Minnesota special election
- Turnout: 63.66%
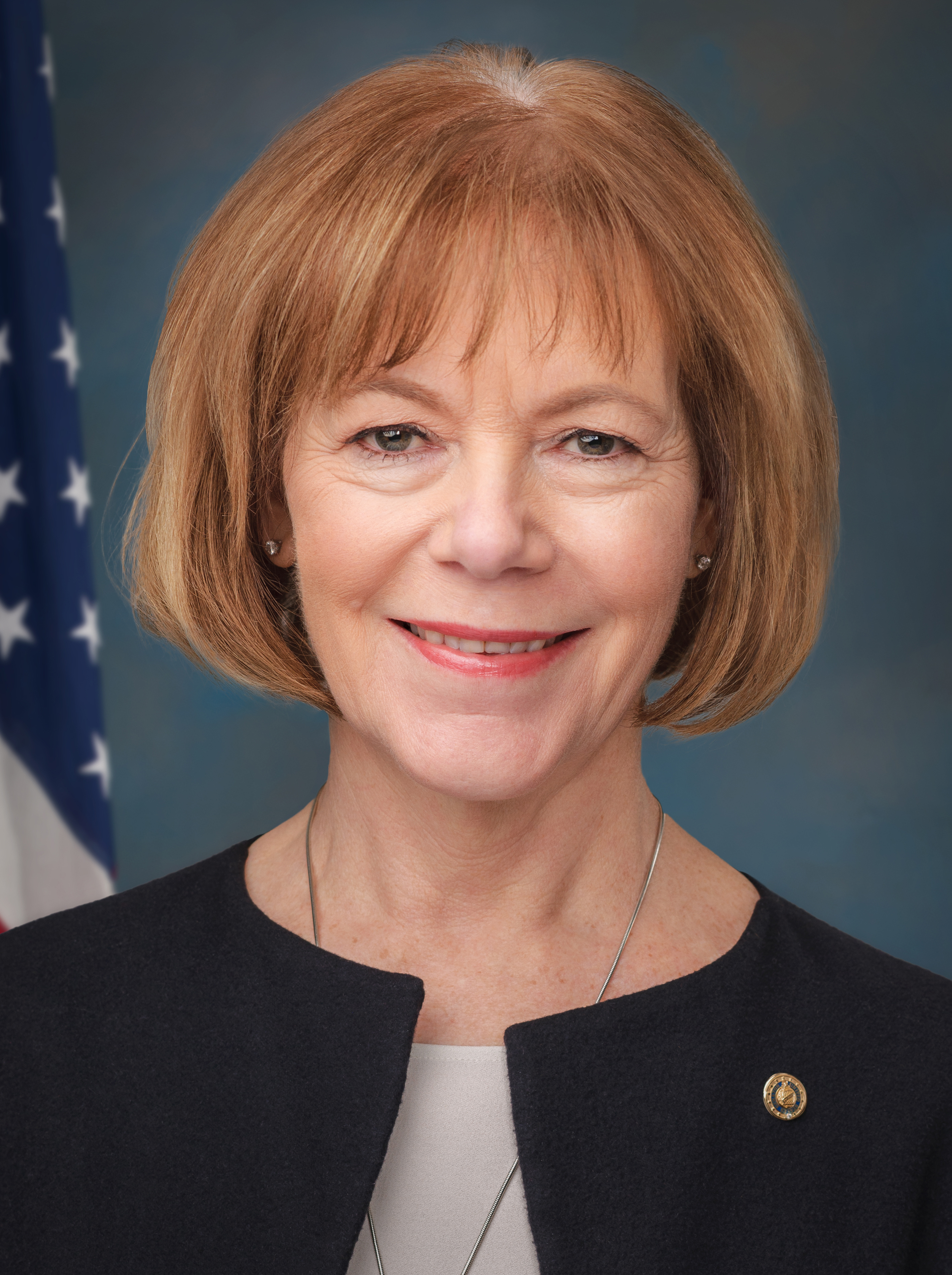

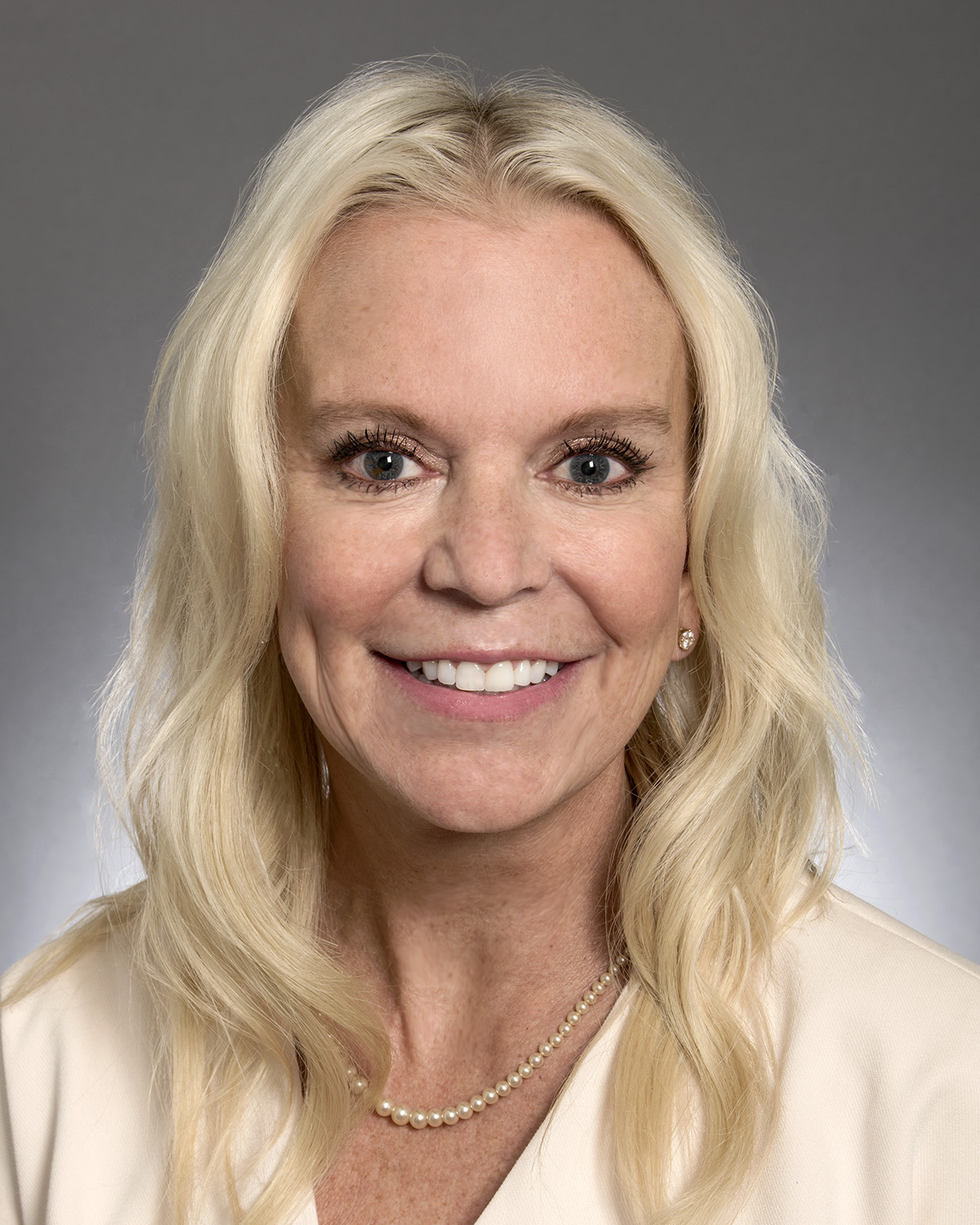
Nominee	Tina Smith	Karin Housley
Party	Democratic (DFL)	Republican
Popular vote	1,370,540	1,095,777
Percentage	52.97%	42.35%
- Smith: 40–50% 50–60% 60–70% Housley: 40–50% 50–60% 60–70%
U.S. senator before election
Tina Smith
Democratic (DFL)
Elected U.S. senator
Tina Smith
Democratic (DFL)

Two-term Democrat Al Franken announced that he would resign in December 2017, following allegations of sexual harassment. Mark Dayton, Governor of Minnesota, appointed Lt. Gov. Tina Smith on January 2, 2018, as an interim Senator until the November 2018 election. She defeated primary challenger Richard Painter in the Democratic primary held on August 14.

Incumbent Tina Smith defeated Republican Karin Housley in the general election to finish the term ending January 3, 2021.

Minnesota Democratic (DFL) primary
Party	Candidate	Votes	%
Democratic (DFL)	Tina Smith (incumbent)	433,705	76.06
Democratic (DFL)	Richard Painter	78,193	13.71
Democratic (DFL)	Ali Chehem Ali	18,897	3.31
Democratic (DFL)	Gregg A. Iverson	17,825	3.13
Democratic (DFL)	Nick Leonard	16,529	2.90
Democratic (DFL)	Christopher Lovell Seymore Sr.	5,041	0.88
Total votes		570,190	100.00

Minnesota Republican primary
Party	Candidate	Votes	%
Republican	Karin Housley	186,384	61.95
Republican	Bob Anderson	107,102	35.60
Republican	Nikolay Nikolayevich Bey	7,375	2.45
Total votes		300,861	100.00

Minnesota special election
Party	Candidate	Votes	%	±%
Democratic (DFL)	Tina Smith (incumbent)	1,370,540	52.97%	–0.18
Republican	Karin Housley	1,095,777	42.35%	–0.56
Legal Marijuana Now	Sarah Wellington	95,614	3.70%	N/A
Independent	Jerry Trooien	24,324	0.94%	N/A
Write-in		1,101	0.04%	±0.00
Total votes		2,587,356	100.00%	
Democratic (DFL) hold				

== Mississippi ==
=== Mississippi (regular) ===
Mississippi general election
- Turnout: 49.66%
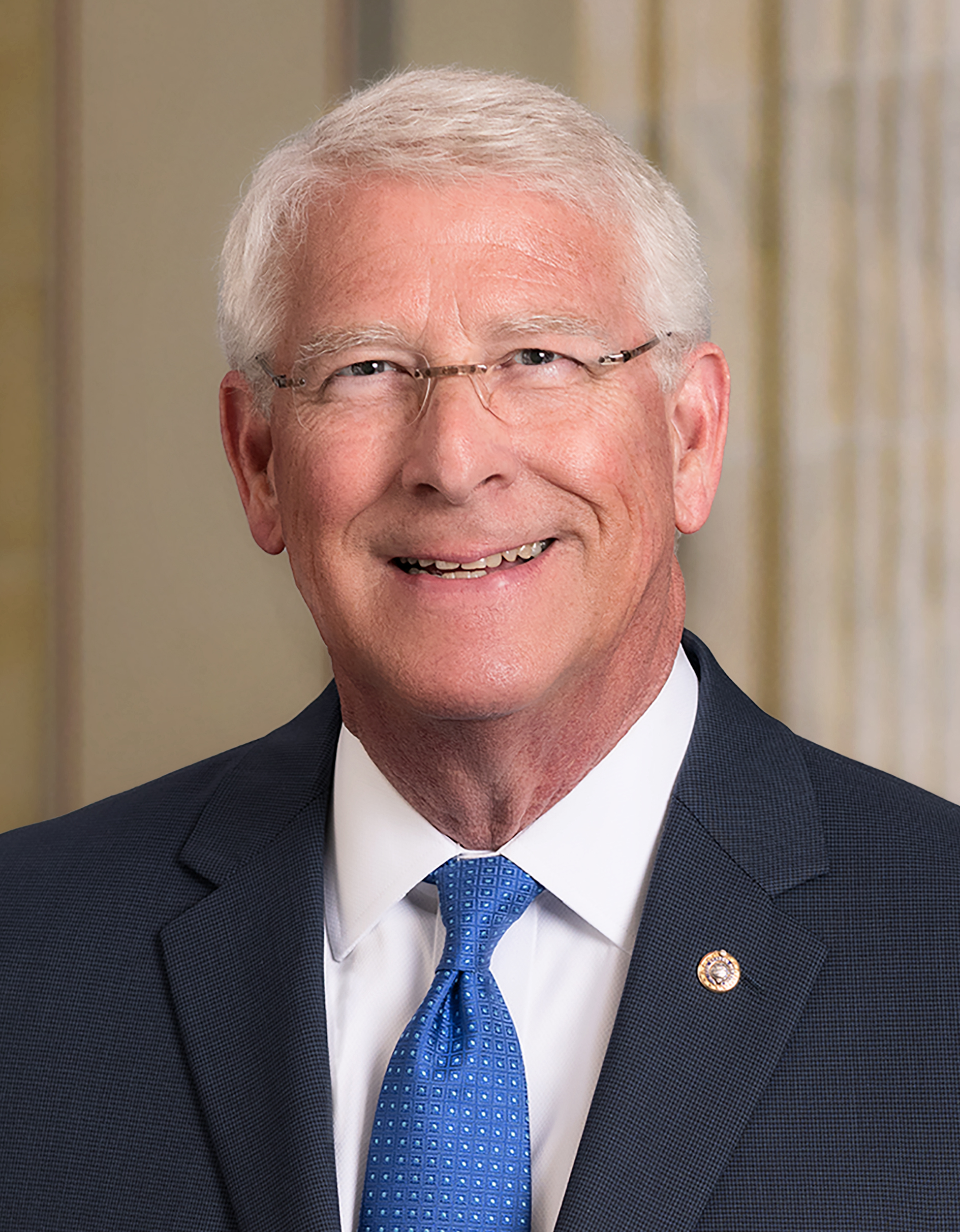

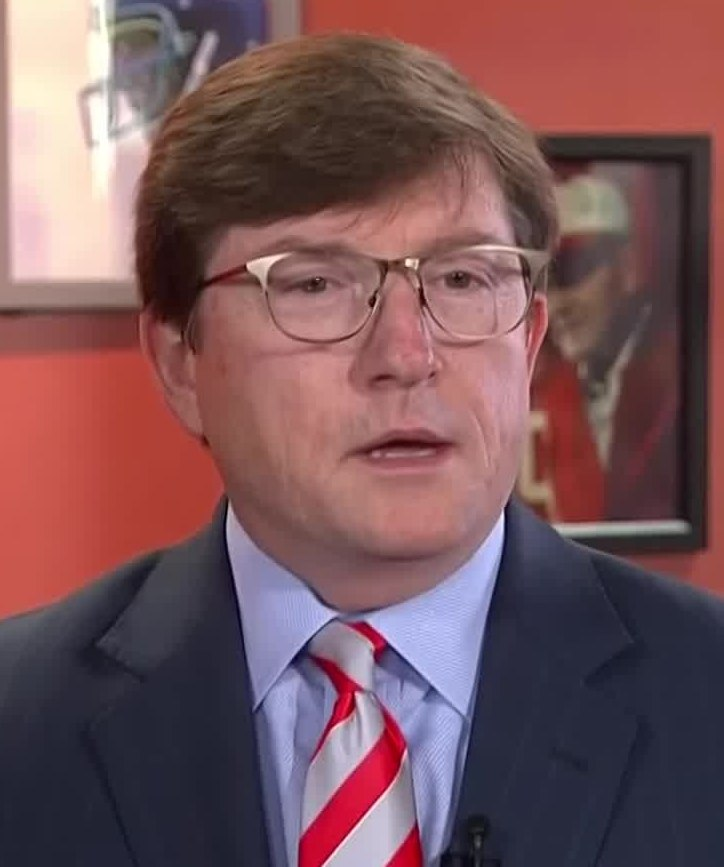
Nominee	Roger Wicker	David Baria
Party	Republican	Democratic
Popular vote	547,619	369,567
Percentage	58.49%	39.47%
- Wicker: 40-50% 50–60% 60–70% 70–80% 80–90% Baria: 40-50% 50–60% 60–70% 70–80%
U.S. senator before election
Roger Wicker
Republican
Elected U.S. senator
Roger Wicker
Republican

One-term Republican Roger Wicker won re-election with 57% of the vote in 2012. He was appointed in 2007 and won a special election in 2008 to serve the remainder of Trent Lott's term.

David Baria won the Democratic nomination in a run-off on June 26.

Wicker was easily re-elected.

Mississippi Republican primary
Party	Candidate	Votes	%
Republican	Roger Wicker (incumbent)	130,118	82.79
Republican	Richard Boyanton	27,052	17.21
Total votes		157,170	100.00

Mississippi Democratic primary
Party	Candidate	Votes	%
Democratic	Howard Sherman	27,957	31.79
Democratic	David Baria	27,244	30.98
Democratic	Omeria Scott	21,278	24.20
Democratic	Victor G. Maurice Jr.	4,361	4.96
Democratic	Jerome Garland	4,266	4.85
Democratic	Jensen Bohren	2,825	3.21
Total votes		87,931	100.00

Mississippi Democratic primary runoff
Party	Candidate	Votes	%
Democratic	David Baria	44,156	58.64
Democratic	Howard Sherman	31,149	41.36
Total votes		75,305	100.00

Mississippi general election
Party	Candidate	Votes	%	±%
Republican	Roger Wicker (incumbent)	547,619	58.49%	+1.33
Democratic	David Baria	369,567	39.47%	–1.08
Libertarian	Danny Bedwell	12,981	1.39%	N/A
Reform	Shawn O'Hara	6,048	0.65%	–0.58
Total votes		936,215	100.00%	
Republican hold				

=== Mississippi (special) ===
2018 United States Senate special election in Mississippi
- November 6, 2018 (first round); November 27, 2018 (runoff)
- Turnout: 48.14%
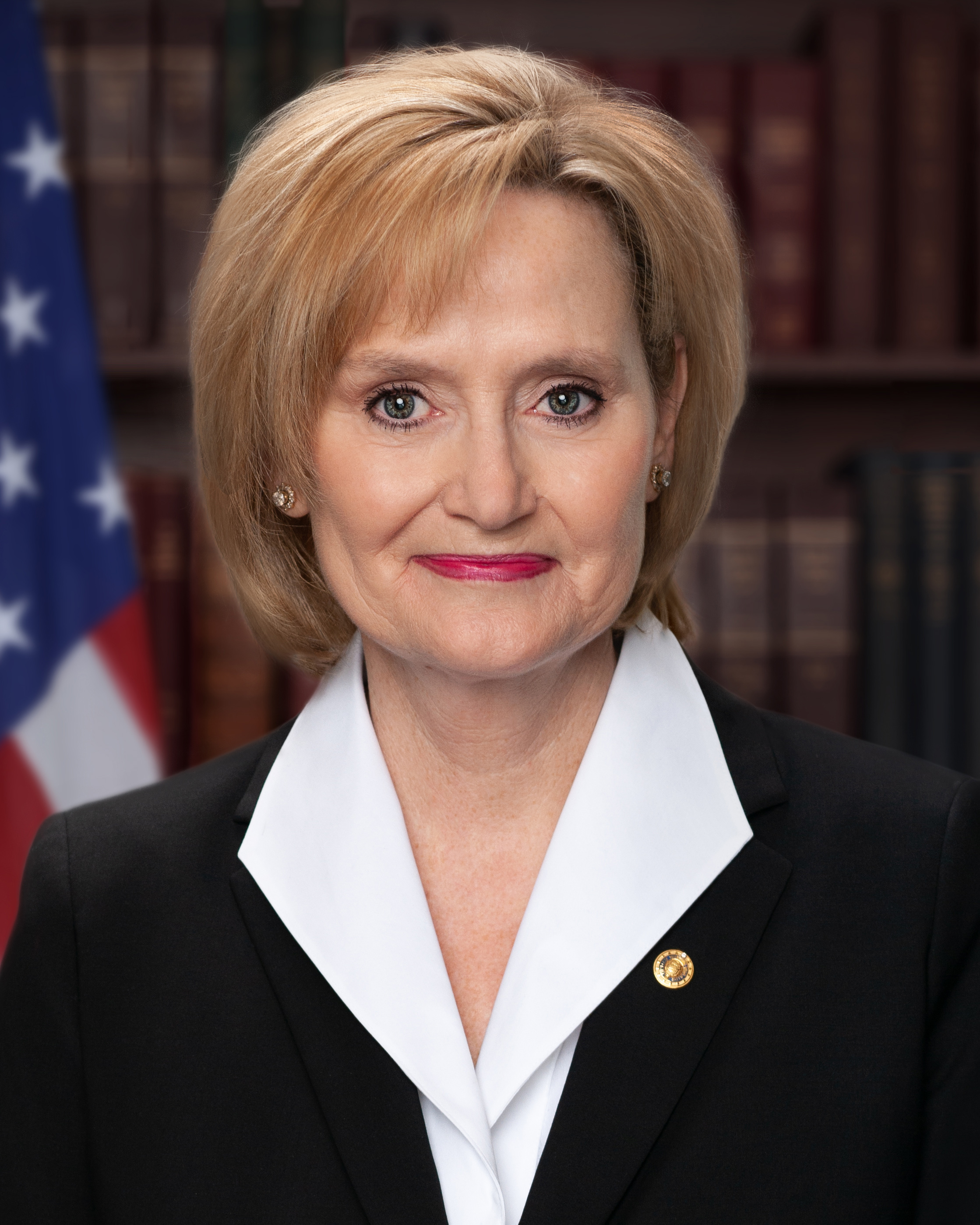

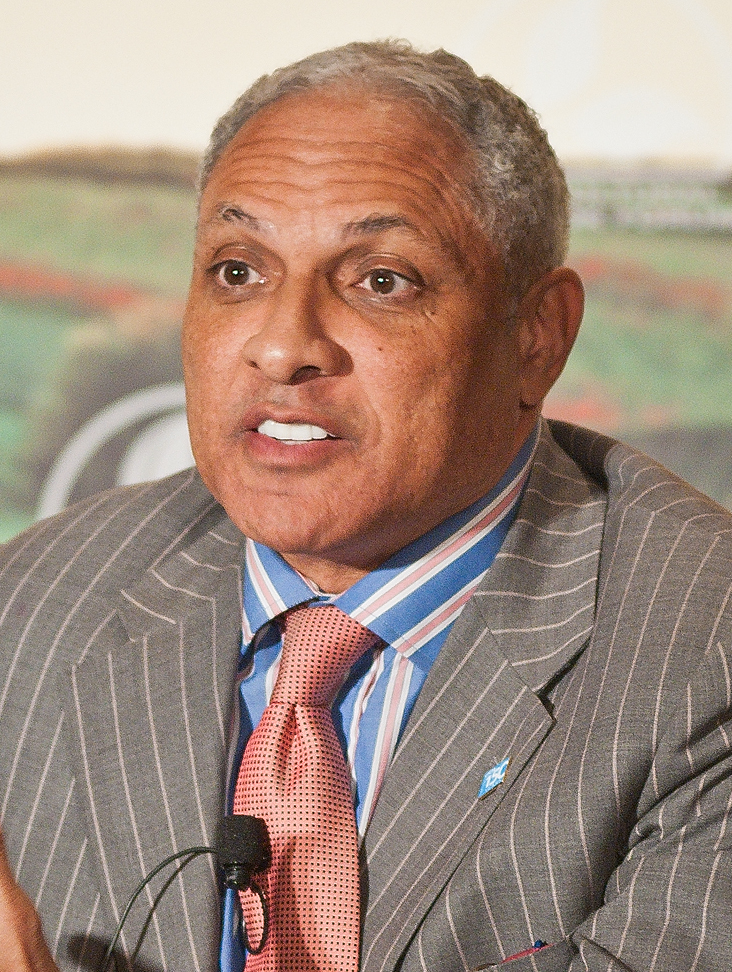

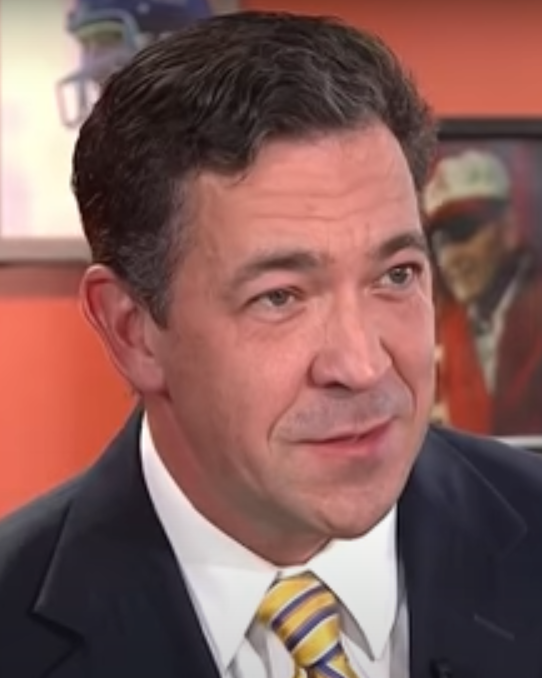
Candidate	Cindy Hyde-Smith	Mike Espy	Chris McDaniel
Party	Republican	Democratic	Republican
First round	389,995; 41.2%	386,742; 40.9%	154,878; 16.4%
Runoff	486,769; 53.6%	420,819; 46.4%	Eliminated
- Hyde-Smith: 30–40% 40–50% 50–60% 60–70% 70–80% 80–90% Espy: 30–40% 40–50% 50–60% 60–70% 70–80% 80–90% McDaniel: 30–40% 40–50%
U.S. senator before election
Cindy Hyde-Smith
Republican
Elected U.S. Senator
Cindy Hyde-Smith
Republican

Seven-term Republican Thad Cochran, who won re-election with 59.9% of the vote in 2014, announced that he would resign since April 1, 2018 for health reasons. Phil Bryant, Governor of Mississippi, announced on March 21, 2018, that he would appoint Mississippi Agriculture Commissioner Cindy Hyde-Smith to fill the vacancy. She ran in the special election.

On November 6, a nonpartisan jungle primary took place on the same day as the regularly scheduled U.S. Senate election for the seat currently held by Roger Wicker. Party affiliations were not printed on the ballot. As no candidate gained 50% of the votes, a runoff special election between the top two candidates - Hyde-Smith and former United States Secretary of Agriculture Mike Espy - was held on November 27, 2018. Hyde-Smith won the runoff election.

Democrat Tobey Bartee and Republican Chris McDaniel also contested the first round of the election.

Mississippi special election
Party	Candidate	Votes	%
Nonpartisan	Cindy Hyde-Smith (incumbent)	389,995	41.25
Nonpartisan	Mike Espy	386,742	40.90
Nonpartisan	Chris McDaniel	154,878	16.38
Nonpartisan	Tobey Bernard Bartee	13,852	1.47
Total votes		945,467	100.00

Mississippi special election runoff
Party	Candidate	Votes	%	±%
Nonpartisan	Cindy Hyde-Smith (incumbent)	486,769	53.63%	–6.27
Nonpartisan	Mike Espy	420,819	46.37%	+8.48
Total votes		907,588	100.00%	
Republican hold				

== Missouri ==
Missouri election
- Turnout: 58.23%
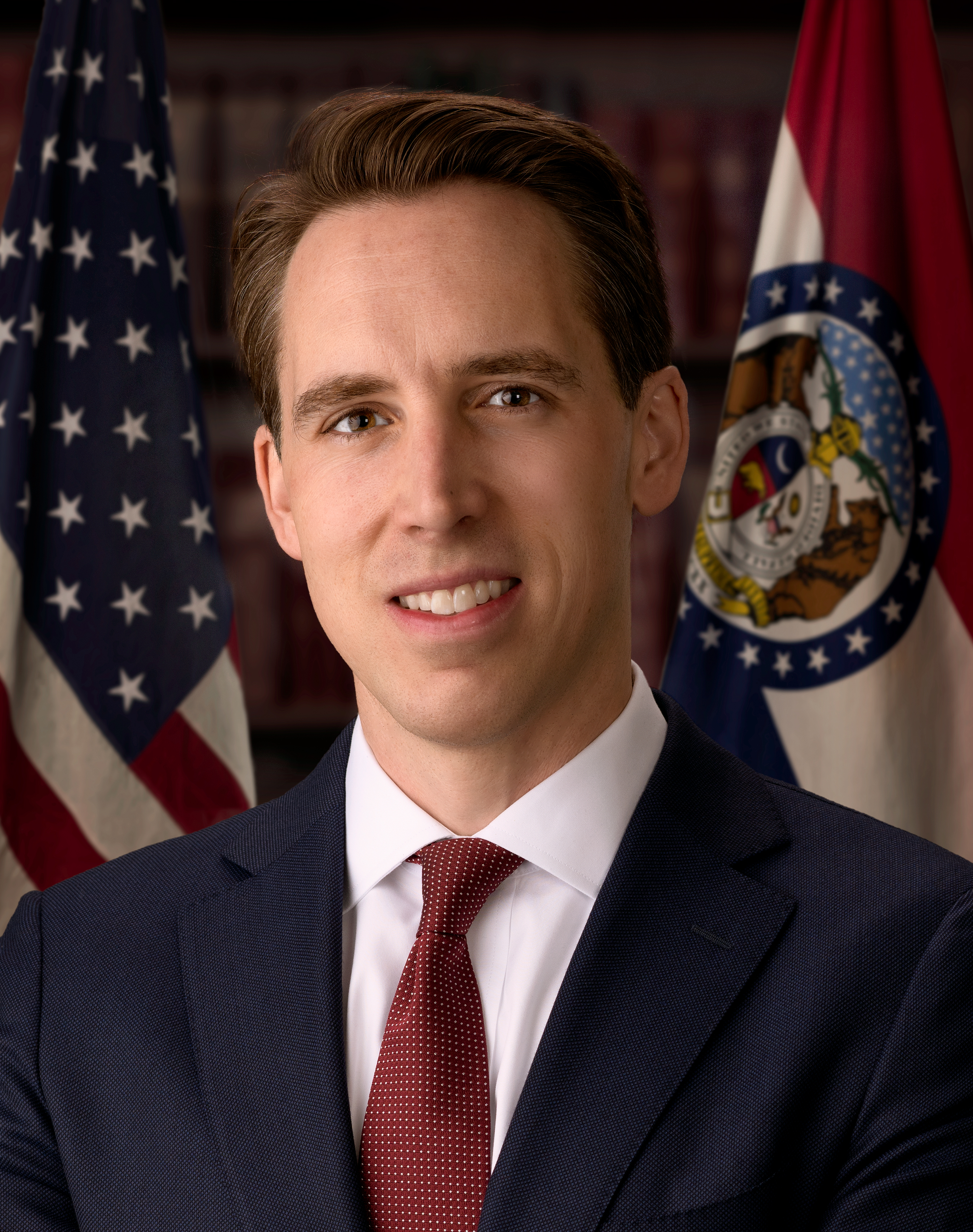

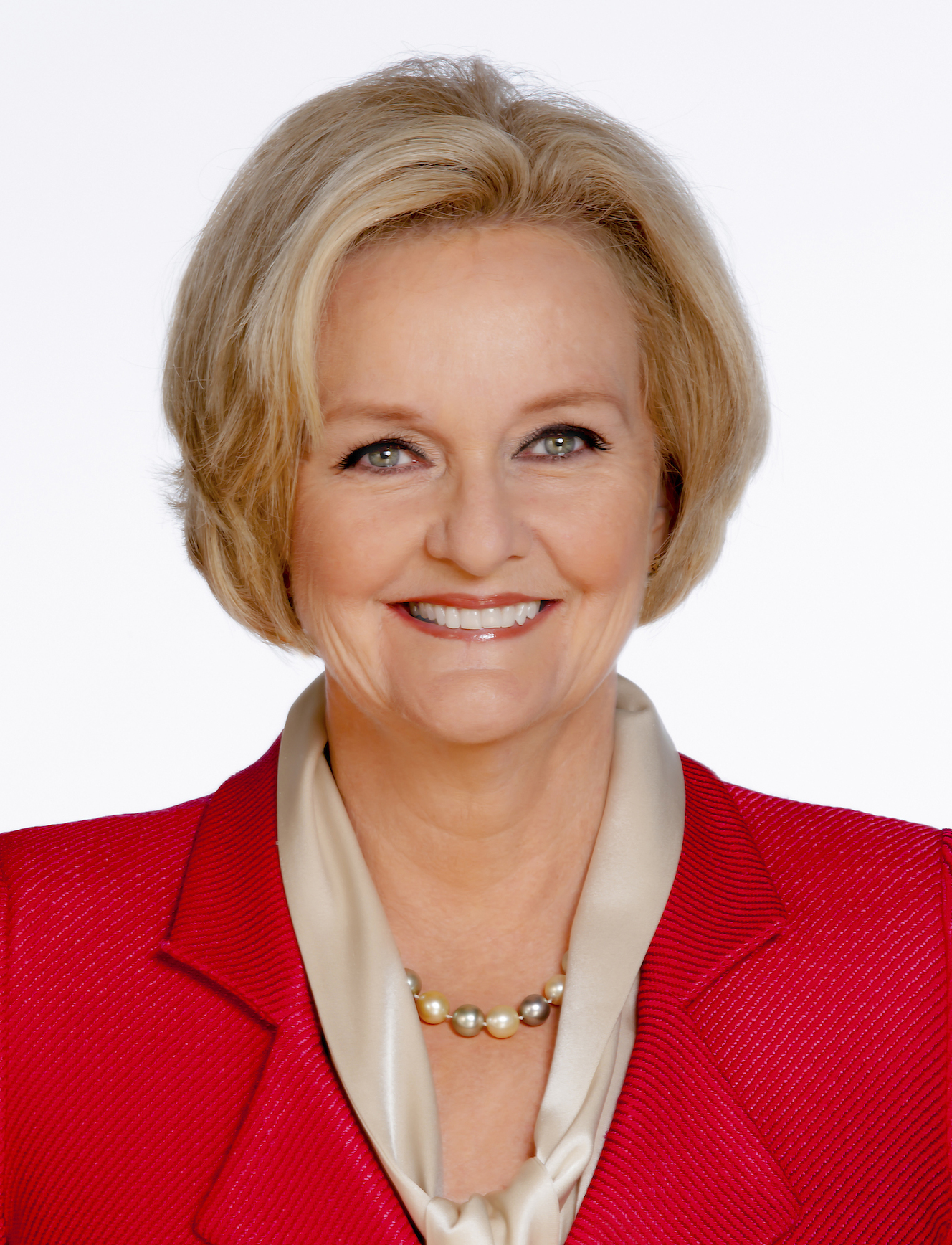
Nominee	Josh Hawley	Claire McCaskill
Party	Republican	Democratic
Popular vote	1,254,927	1,112,935
Percentage	51.38%	45.57%
- Hawley: 40–50% 50–60% 60–70% 70–80% 80–90% McCaskill: 40–50% 50–60% 60–70% 80–90%
U.S. senator before election
Claire McCaskill
Democratic
Elected U.S. senator
Josh Hawley
Republican

Two-term Democrat Claire McCaskill was re-elected with 55% of the vote in 2012. She was renominated.

Attorney General Josh Hawley won the Republican nomination. Japheth Campbell declared his candidacy for the Libertarian nomination.

Polls showed a close race for months leading up to the election. Hawley defeated McCaskill in the general election.

Missouri Democratic primary
Party	Candidate	Votes	%
Democratic	Claire McCaskill (incumbent)	501,872	82.60
Democratic	Carla Wright	41,126	6.77
Democratic	David Faust	15,984	2.63
Democratic	John Hogan	15,958	2.63
Democratic	Angelica Earl	15,500	2.55
Democratic	Travis Gonzalez	9,480	1.56
Democratic	Leonard Joseph Steinman II	7,657	1.26
Total votes		607,577	100.00

Missouri Republican primary
Party	Candidate	Votes	%
Republican	Josh Hawley	389,978	58.64
Republican	Tony Monetti	64,834	9.75
Republican	Austin Petersen	54,916	8.26
Republican	Kristi Nichols	49,640	7.47
Republican	Christina Smith	35,024	5.27
Republican	Ken Patterson	19,579	2.94
Republican	Peter Pfeifer	16,594	2.50
Republican	Courtland Sykes	13,870	2.09
Republican	Fred Ryman	8,781	1.32
Republican	Brian G. Hagg	6,871	1.03
Republican	Bradley Krembs	4,902	0.74
Total votes		664,889	100.00

Missouri general election
Party	Candidate	Votes	%	±%
Republican	Josh Hawley	1,254,927	51.38%	+12.27
Democratic	Claire McCaskill (incumbent)	1,112,935	45.57%	–9.24
Independent	Craig O'Dear	34,398	1.41%	N/A
Libertarian	Japheth Campbell	27,316	1.12%	–4.95
Green	Jo Crain	12,706	0.52%	N/A
Write-in		7	0.00%	–0.01
Total votes		2,442,289	100.00%	
Republican gain from Democratic				

== Montana ==
Montana election
- Turnout: 70.86%
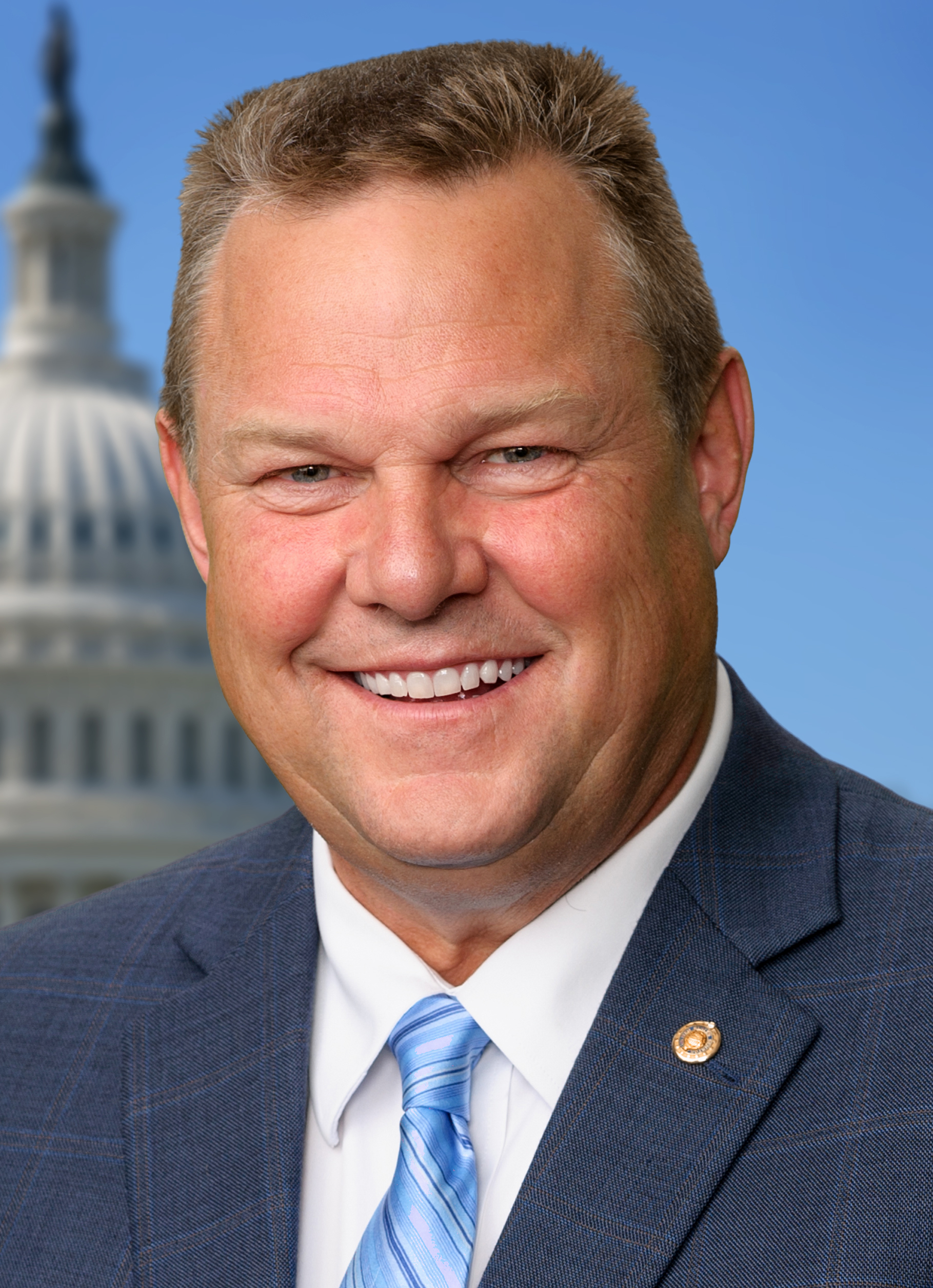

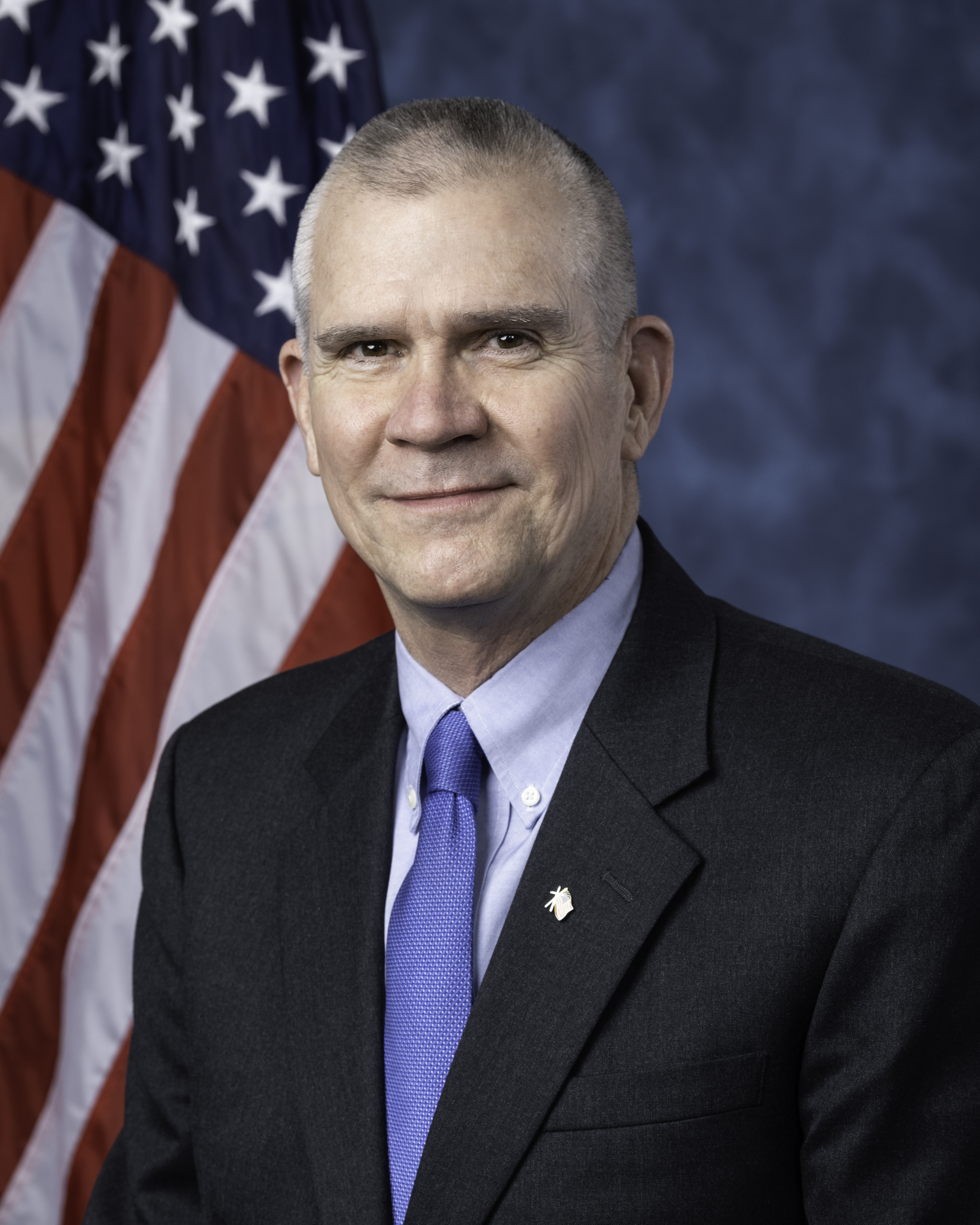
Nominee	Jon Tester	Matt Rosendale
Party	Democratic	Republican
Popular vote	253,876	235,963
Percentage	50.33%	46.78%
- Tester: 50–60% 60–70% 70–80% Rosendale: 40–50% 50–60% 60–70% 70–80% 80–90%
U.S. senator before election
Jon Tester
Democratic
Elected U.S. senator
Jon Tester
Democratic

Two-term Democrat Jon Tester was re-elected with 49% of the vote in 2012. He won the Democratic nomination in the June 5 primary with no opposition.

State Auditor Matthew Rosendale won the Republican nomination in the June 5 primary. State Senator Albert Olszewski, former judge Russell Fagg, and Troy Downing also ran for the Republican nomination.

Tester was re-elected winning over 50% of the vote.

Montana Democratic primary
Party	Candidate	Votes	%
Democratic	Jon Tester (incumbent)	114,948	100.00
Write-in		5	0.00
Total votes		114,953	100.00

Montana Republican primary
Party	Candidate	Votes	%
Republican	Matt Rosendale	51,859	33.82
Republican	Russell Fagg	43,465	28.34
Republican	Troy Downing	29,341	19.13
Republican	Albert Olszewski	28,681	18.70
Write-in		9	0.01
Total votes		153,355	100.00

Montana general election
Party	Candidate	Votes	%	±%
Democratic	Jon Tester (incumbent)	253,876	50.33%	+1.75
Republican	Matt Rosendale	235,963	46.78%	+1.92
Libertarian	Rick Breckenridge	14,545	2.88%	–3.68
Total votes		504,384	100.00%	
Democratic hold				

== Nebraska ==
Nebraska election
- Turnout: 57.32%
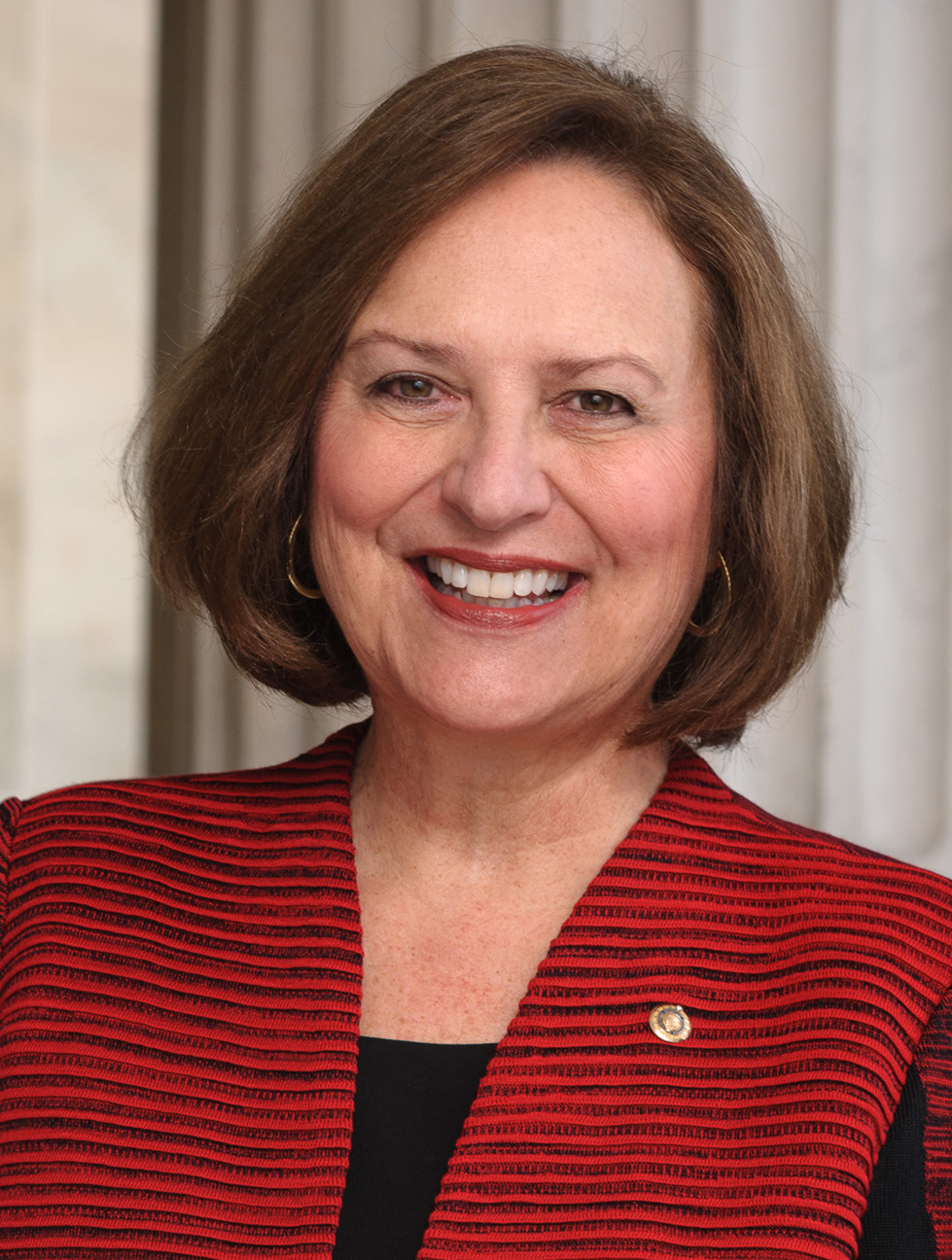

Nominee	Deb Fischer	Jane Raybould
Party	Republican	Democratic
Popular vote	403,151	269,917
Percentage	57.69%	38.62%
- Fischer: 50–60% 60–70% 70–80% 80–90% >90% Raybould: 40–50% 50–60%
U.S. senator before election
Deb Fischer
Republican
Elected U.S. senator
Deb Fischer
Republican

One-term Republican Deb Fischer was elected with 58% of the vote in 2012. She ran for and won the Republican nomination in the May 15 primary. Other Republicans who ran include retired professor Jack Heidel, Todd Watson, and Dennis Frank Macek.

Lincoln City Councilwoman Jane Raybould ran for and won the Democratic nomination in the May 15 primary. Other Democrats who ran include Frank Svoboda, Chris Janicek, and Larry Marvin, who was a candidate in 2008, 2012, and 2014.

Jim Schultz ran for the Libertarian nomination.

Fischer was easily re-elected.

Nebraska Republican primary
Party	Candidate	Votes	%
Republican	Deb Fischer (incumbent)	128,157	75.79
Republican	Todd F. Watson	19,661	11.63
Republican	Jack Heidel	9,413	5.57
Republican	Jeffrey Lynn Stein	6,380	3.77
Republican	Dennis Frank Macek	5,483	3.24
Total votes		169,094	100.00

Nebraska Democratic primary
Party	Candidate	Votes	%
Democratic	Jane Raybould	59,067	63.68
Democratic	Chris Janicek	18,752	20.22
Democratic	Frank B. Svoboda	10,548	11.37
Democratic	Larry Marvin	4,393	4.74
Total votes		92,760	100.00

Nebraska general election
Party	Candidate	Votes	%	±%
Republican	Deb Fischer (incumbent)	403,151	57.69%	–0.08
Democratic	Jane Raybould	269,917	38.62%	–3.61
Libertarian	Jim Schultz	25,349	3.63%	N/A
Write-in		466	0.07%	N/A
Total votes		698,883	100.00%	
Republican hold				

== Nevada ==
Nevada election
- Turnout: 62.26%
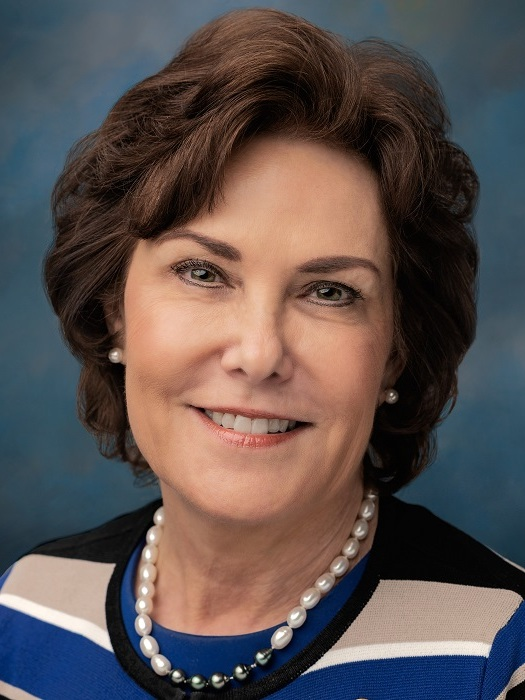

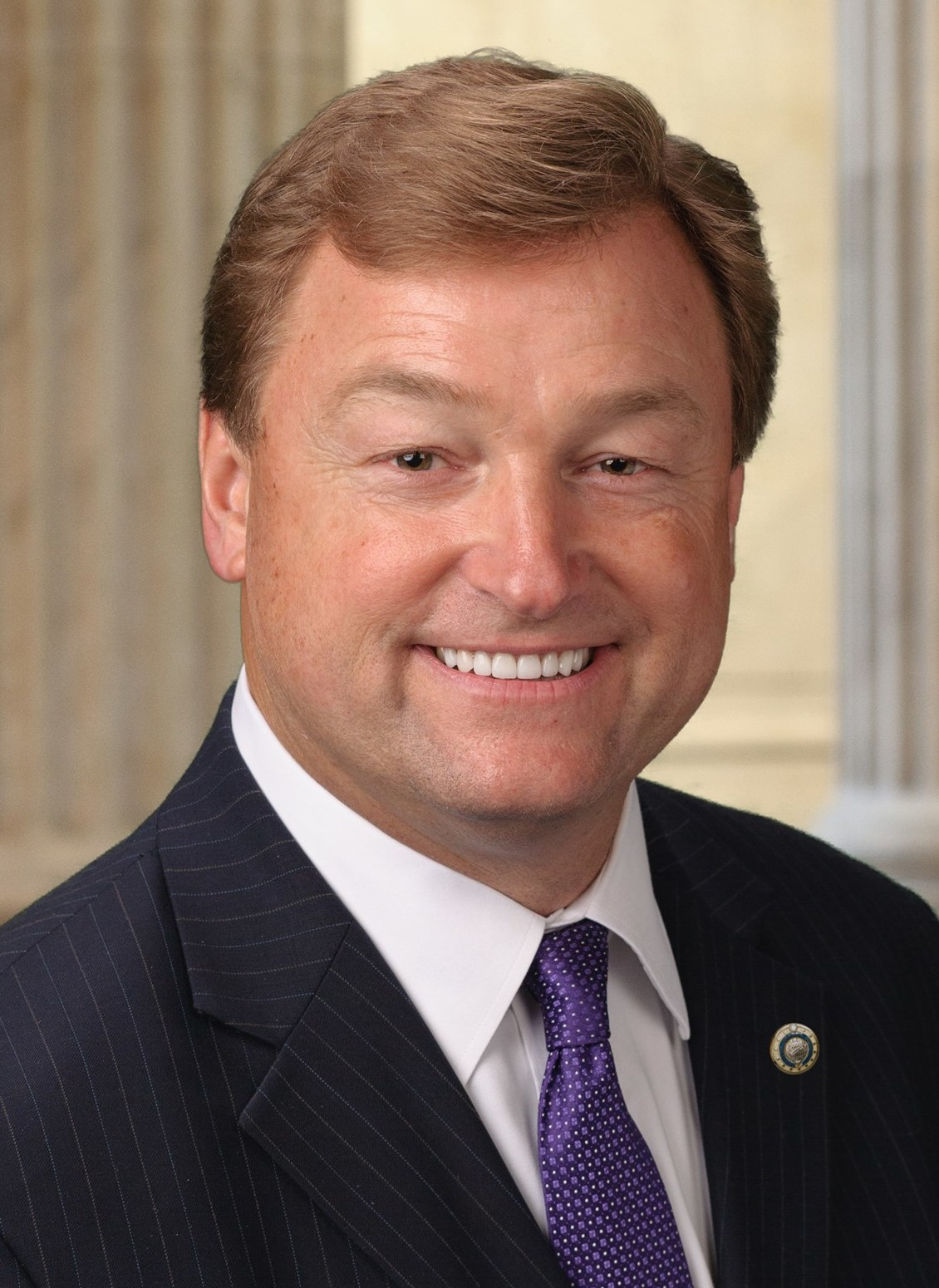
Nominee	Jacky Rosen	Dean Heller
Party	Democratic	Republican
Popular vote	490,071	441,202
Percentage	50.41%	45.38%
- Rosen: 40–50% 50–60% Heller: 50–60% 60–70% 70–80% 80–90%
U.S. senator before election
Dean Heller
Republican
Elected U.S. senator
Jacky Rosen
Democratic

Incumbent Republican Dean Heller was the Republican nominee. He was appointed to the seat in 2011 and then elected with 46% of the vote in 2012. Heller considered running for governor, but chose to seek re-election.

Nevada was the only state in the mid-term elections that had an incumbent Republican senator in a state that Hillary Clinton had won in 2016.

Representative Jacky Rosen was the Democratic nominee.

Rosen defeated Heller in the general election, making Heller the only Republican incumbent to lose re-election in 2018.

Nevada Republican primary
Party	Candidate	Votes	%
Republican	Dean Heller (incumbent)	99,509	69.97
Republican	Tom Heck	26,296	18.49
None of These Candidates		5,978	4.20
Republican	Sherry Brooks	5,145	3.62
Republican	Sarah Gazala	4,011	2.82
Republican	Vic Harrell	1,282	0.90
Total votes		142,221	100.00

Nevada Democratic primary
Party	Candidate	Votes	%
Democratic	Jacky Rosen	110,567	77.11
None of These Candidates		10,078	7.03
Democratic	David Drew Knight	6,346	4.43
Democratic	Allen Rheinhart	4,782	3.33
Democratic	Jesse Sbaih	4,540	3.17
Democratic	Sujeet Mahendra	3,835	2.67
Democratic	Danny Burleigh	3,244	2.26
Total votes		143,392	100.00

Nevada general election
Party	Candidate	Votes	%	±%
Democratic	Jacky Rosen	490,071	50.41%	+5.70
Republican	Dean Heller (incumbent)	441,202	45.38%	–0.49
None of These Candidates		15,303	1.57%	–2.97
Independent	Barry Michaels	9,269	0.95%	N/A
Libertarian	Tim Hagan	9,196	0.95%	N/A
Independent American	Kamau A. Bakari	7,091	0.73%	–4.16
Total votes		972,132	100.00%	
Democratic gain from Republican				

== New Jersey ==
New Jersey election
- Turnout: 53.38%
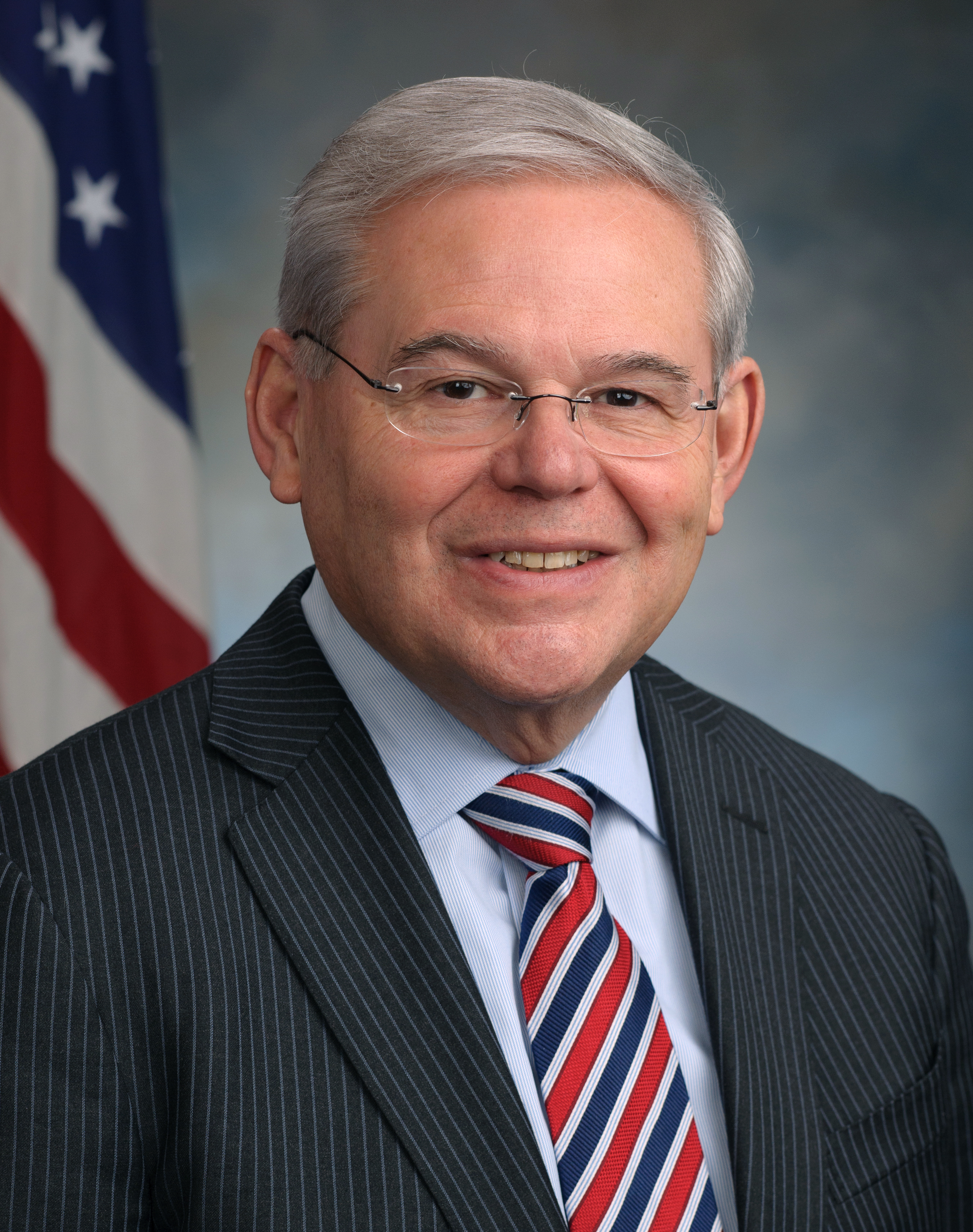

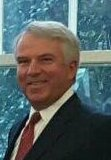
Nominee	Bob Menendez	Bob Hugin
Party	Democratic	Republican
Popular vote	1,711,654	1,357,355
Percentage	54.01%	42.83%
- Menendez: 40–50% 50–60% 60–70% 70–80% 80–90% >90% Hugin: 40–50% 50–60% 60–70% 70–80%
U.S. senator before election
Bob Menendez
Democratic
Elected U.S. senator
Bob Menendez
Democratic

Republican Bob Hugin was nominated to face two-term Democrat Bob Menendez, who was re-elected with 59% of the vote in 2012. Menendez was originally appointed to the seat in January 2006. He ran for re-election, despite recent scandals that plagued his campaign.

Hugin self-funded most of his campaign. Ultimately, Menendez was re-elected with nearly 54% of the vote.

New Jersey Democratic primary
Party	Candidate	Votes	%
Democratic	Bob Menendez (incumbent)	262,477	62.28
Democratic	Lisa A. McCormick	158,998	37.72
Total votes		421,475	100.00

New Jersey Republican primary
Party	Candidate	Votes	%
Republican	Bob Hugin	168,052	75.13
Republican	Brian D. Goldberg	55,624	24.87
Total votes		223,676	100.00

New Jersey general election
Party	Candidate	Votes	%	±%
Democratic	Bob Menendez (incumbent)	1,711,654	54.01%	–4.86
Republican	Bob Hugin	1,357,355	42.83%	+3.46
Green	Madelyn R. Hoffman	25,150	0.79%	+0.32
Libertarian	Murray Sabrin	21,212	0.67%	+0.17
Independent	Natalie Lynn Rivera	19,897	0.63%	N/A
Independent	Tricia Flanagan	16,101	0.51%	N/A
Independent	Kevin Kimple	9,087	0.29%	N/A
Independent	Hank Schroeder	8,854	0.28%	N/A
Total votes		3,169,310	100.00%	
Democratic hold				

== New Mexico ==
New Mexico election
- Turnout: 55.03%
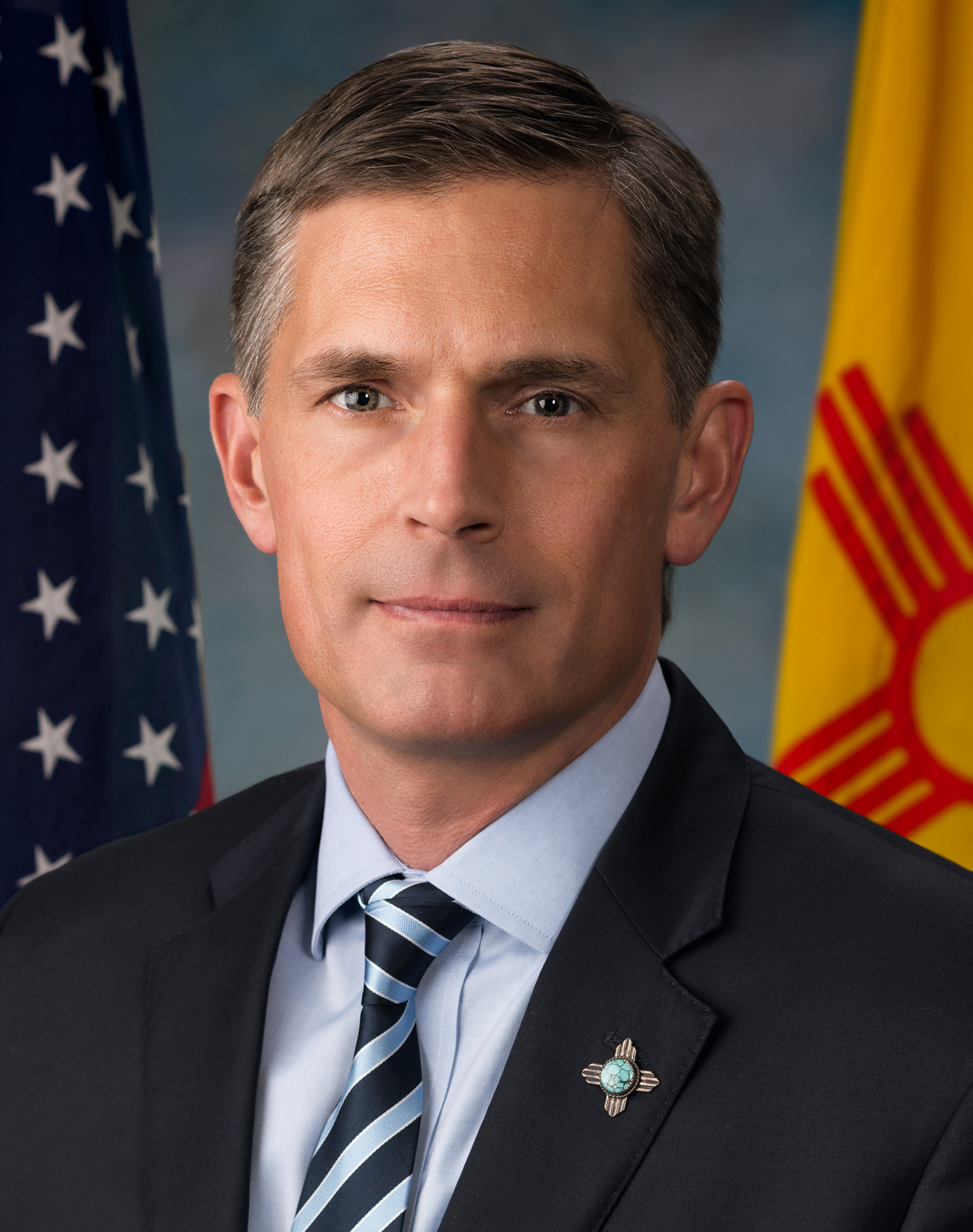

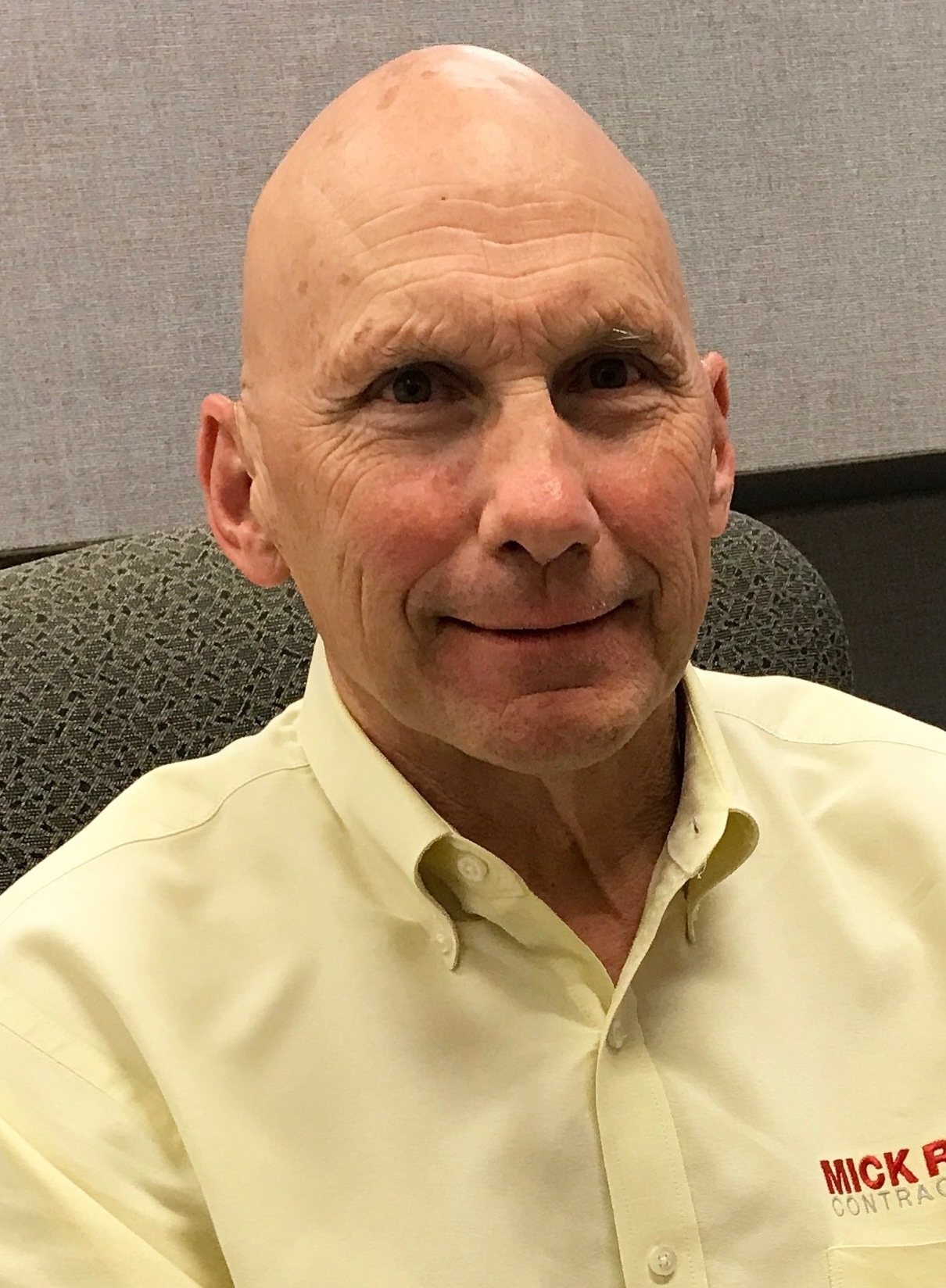

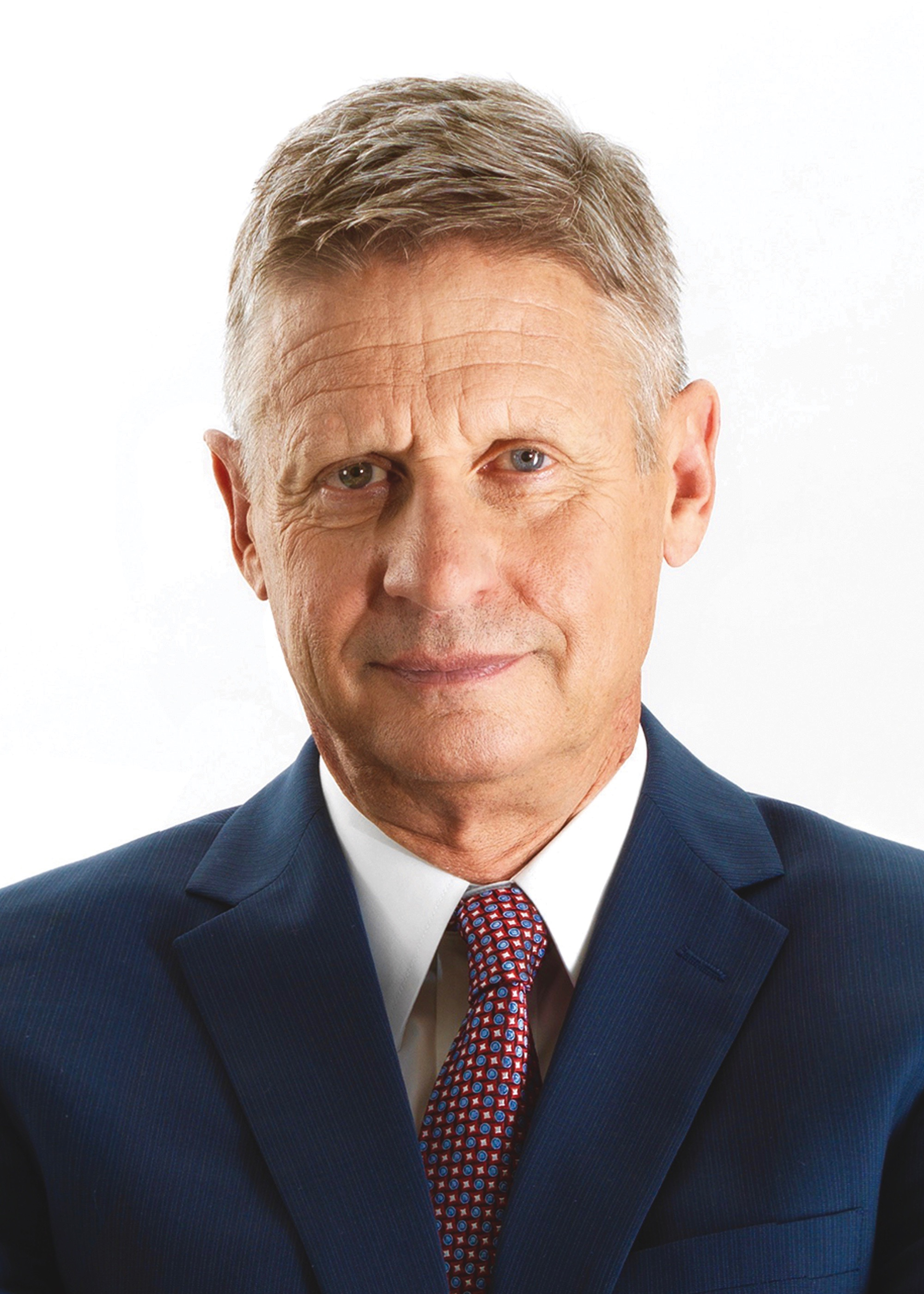
Nominee	Martin Heinrich	Mick Rich	Gary Johnson
Party	Democratic	Republican	Libertarian
Popular vote	376,998	212,813	107,201
Percentage	54.09%	30.53%	15.38%
- Heinrich: 40–50% 50–60% 60–70% 70–80% Rich: 40–50% 50–60% 60–70%
U.S. senator before election
Martin Heinrich
Democratic
Elected U.S. senator
Martin Heinrich
Democratic

One-term Democrat Martin Heinrich was elected with 51% of the vote in 2012. He ran unopposed. Mick Rich won the Republican nomination unopposed.

Aubrey Dunn Jr., New Mexico Commissioner of Public Lands and otherwise the first Libertarian to ever hold statewide elected office in history, announced his run for the seat, but withdrew on July 30, and former Governor of New Mexico Gary Johnson served as Dunn's replacement nominee.

Heinrich was easily re-elected, defeating Rich and Johnson.

New Mexico Democratic primary
Party	Candidate	Votes	%
Democratic	Martin Heinrich (incumbent)	152,145	100.00
Total votes		152,145	100.00

New Mexico Republican primary
Party	Candidate	Votes	%
Republican	Mick Rich	67,502	100.00
Total votes		67,502	100.00

New Mexico Libertarian primary
Party	Candidate	Votes	%
Libertarian	Aubrey Dunn Jr.	623	100.00
Total votes		623	100.00

New Mexico general election
Party	Candidate	Votes	%	±%
Democratic	Martin Heinrich (incumbent)	376,998	54.09%	+3.08
Republican	Mick Rich	212,813	30.53%	–14.75
Libertarian	Gary Johnson	107,201	15.38%	N/A
Total votes		697,012	100.00%	
Democratic hold				

== New York ==
New York election
- Turnout: 52.32%
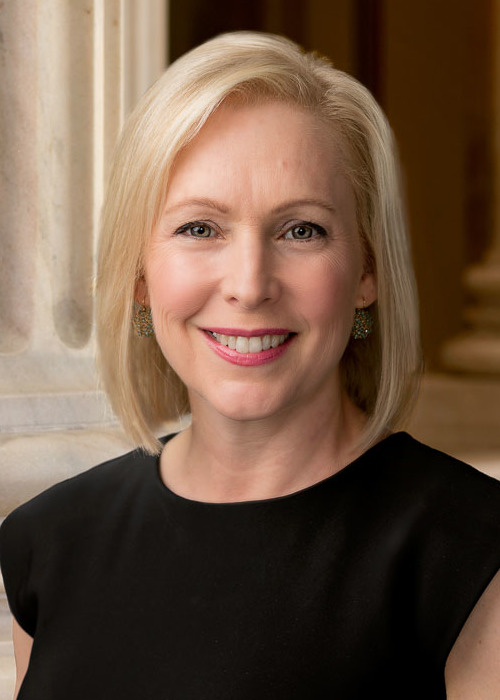

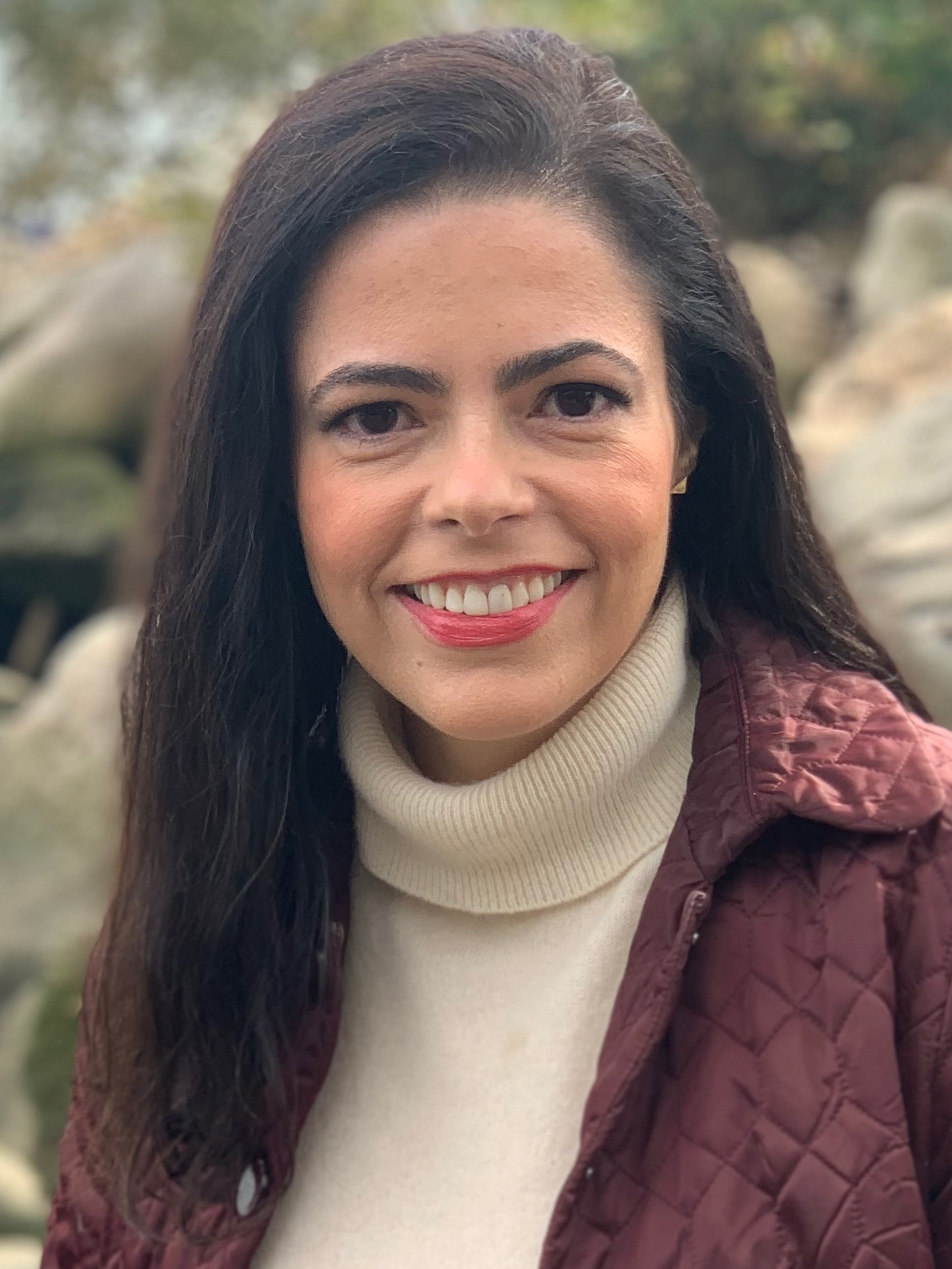
Nominee	Kirsten Gillibrand	Chele Chiavacci Farley
Party	Democratic	Republican
Popular vote	4,056,931	1,998,220
Percentage	67.00%	33.00%
- County results Gillibrand: 50–60% 60–70% 70–80% 80–90% >90% Farley: 50–60% 60–70%
U.S. senator before election
Kirsten Gillibrand
Democratic
Elected U.S. senator
Kirsten Gillibrand
Democratic

One-term Democrat Kirsten Gillibrand was elected with 72% of the vote in 2012. She had previously been appointed to the seat in 2009 and won a special election to remain in office in 2010. She ran for reelection.

Private equity executive Chele Chiavacci Farley was nominated for the U.S. Senate by the Republican and Conservative Parties.

Gillibrand was elected to a second term.

New York general election
Party	Candidate	Votes	%	±%
Democratic	Kirsten Gillibrand	3,755,489	61.98%	–4.40
Working Families	Kirsten Gillibrand	160,128	2.64%	–1.12
Independence	Kirsten Gillibrand	99,325	1.64%	–0.43
Women's Equality	Kirsten Gillibrand	41,989	0.69%	N/A
Total	Kirsten Gillibrand (incumbent)	4,056,931	66.96%	–5.25
Republican	Chele Farley	1,730,439	28.56%	+5.83
Conservative	Chele Farley	246,171	4.06%	+0.45
Reform	Chele Farley	21,610	0.36%	N/A
Total	Chele Farley	1,998,220	32.98%	+6.64
Write-in		3,872	0.06%	N/A
Total votes		6,059,023	100.00%	
Democratic hold				

== North Dakota ==
North Dakota election
- Turnout: 56.27%
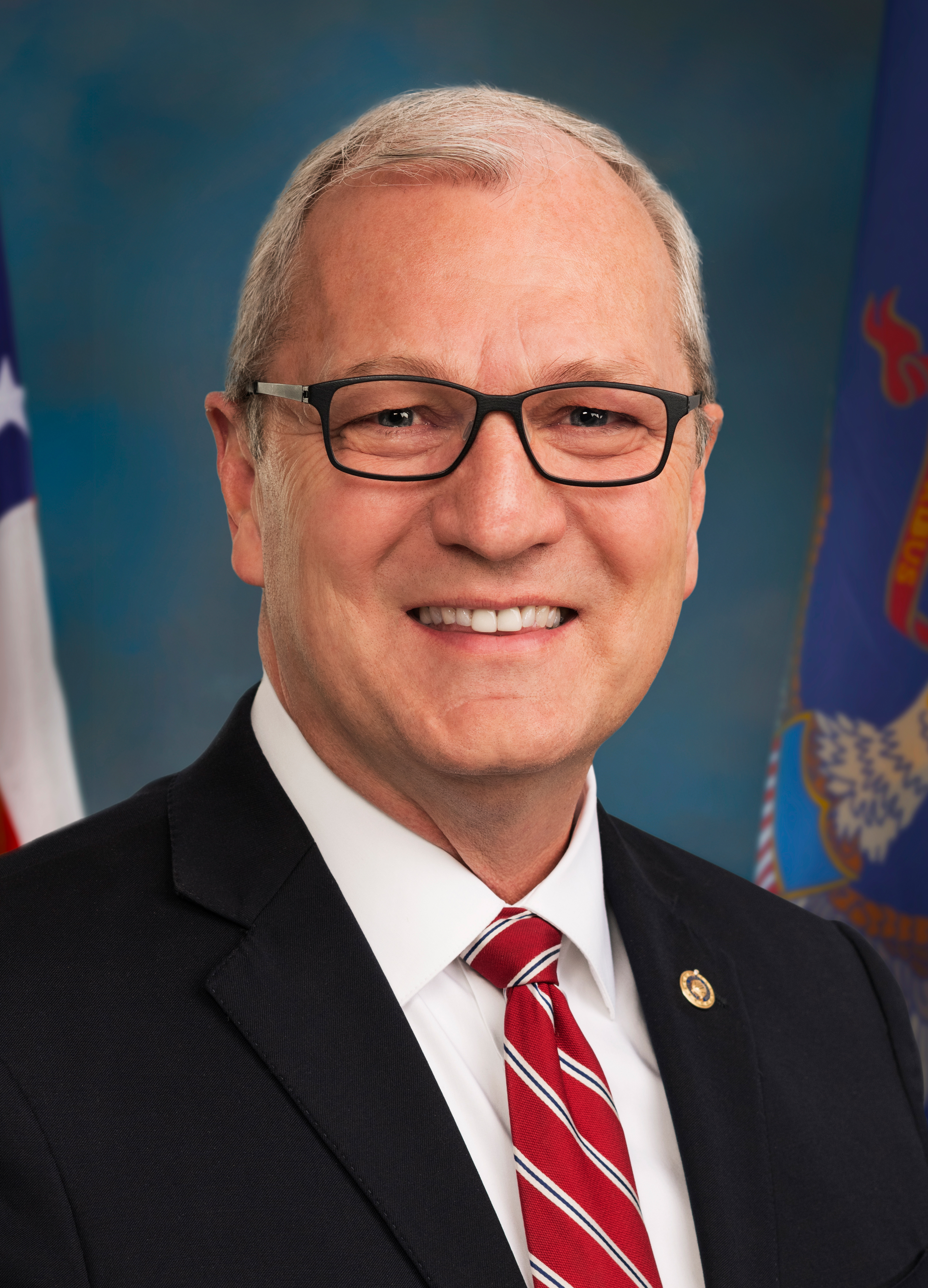

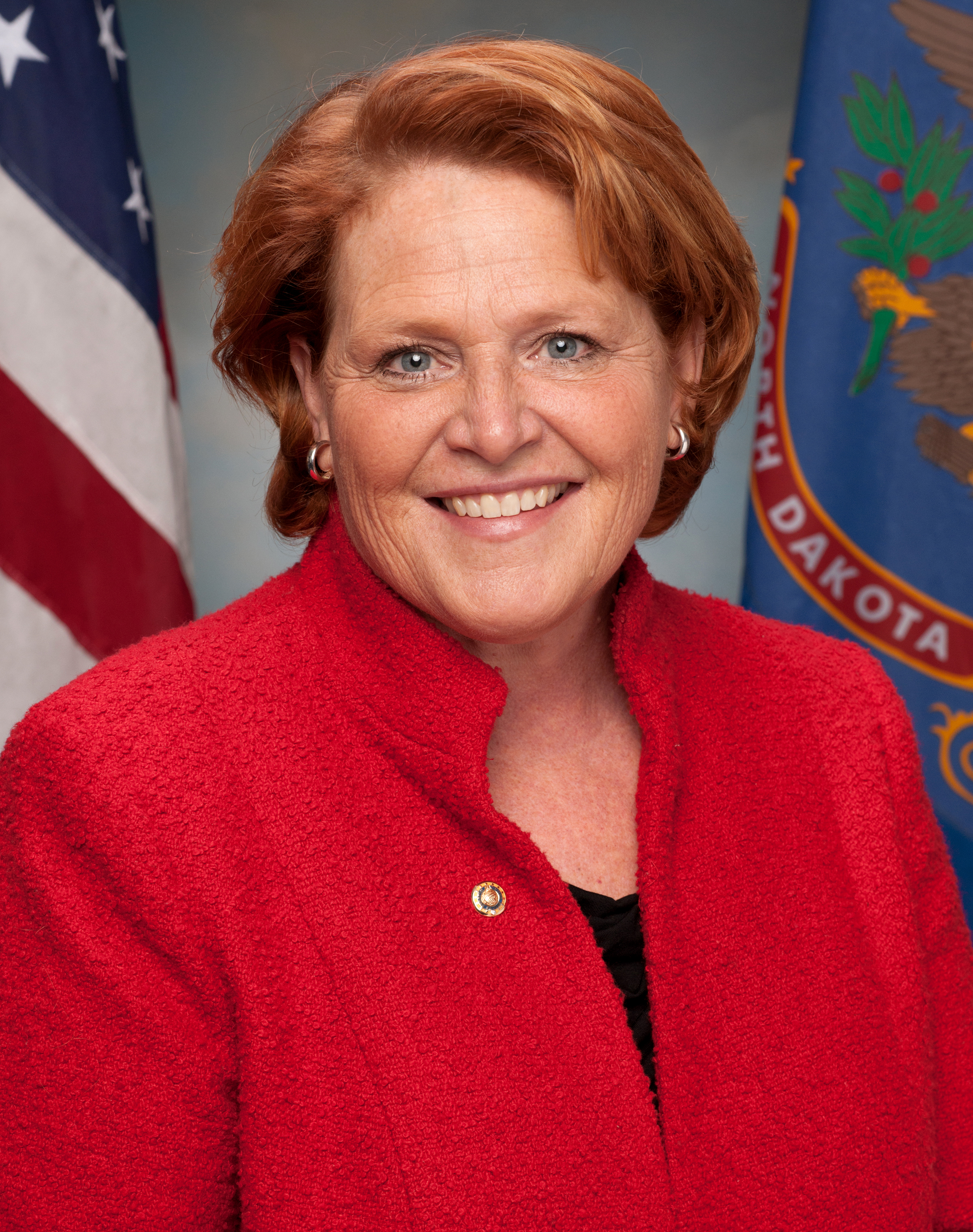
Nominee	Kevin Cramer	Heidi Heitkamp
Party	Republican	Democratic–NPL
Popular vote	179,720	144,376
Percentage	55.45%	44.55%
- Cramer: 50–60% 60–70% 70–80% 80–90% Heitkamp: 50–60% 60–70% 80–90%
U.S. senator before election
Heidi Heitkamp
Democratic–NPL
Elected U.S. senator
Kevin Cramer
Republican

One-term Democrat Heidi Heitkamp was elected with 50% of the vote in 2012. She won the Democratic nomination unopposed.

Representative Kevin Cramer won the Republican nomination in the June 12 primary. Former Niagara, North Dakota Mayor Thomas O'Neill also ran for the Republican nomination.

Heitkamp was continuously behind in the polls leading up to the election, and Heitkamp ended up losing to Cramer by 11%.

North Dakota Democratic-NPL primary
Party	Candidate	Votes	%
Democratic–NPL	Heidi Heitkamp (incumbent)	36,729	99.58
Write-in		154	0.42
Total votes		36,883	100.00

North Dakota Republican primary
Party	Candidate	Votes	%
Republican	Kevin Cramer	61,529	87.73
Republican	Thomas O'Neill	8,509	12.13
Write-in		95	0.14
Total votes		70,133	100.00

North Dakota general election
Party	Candidate	Votes	%	±%
Republican	Kevin Cramer	179,720	55.11%	+5.79
Democratic–NPL	Heidi Heitkamp (incumbent)	144,376	44.27%	–5.97
Write-in		2,042	0.63%	+0.19
Total votes		326,138	100.00%	
Republican gain from Democratic–NPL				

== Ohio ==
Ohio election
- Turnout: 55.79%
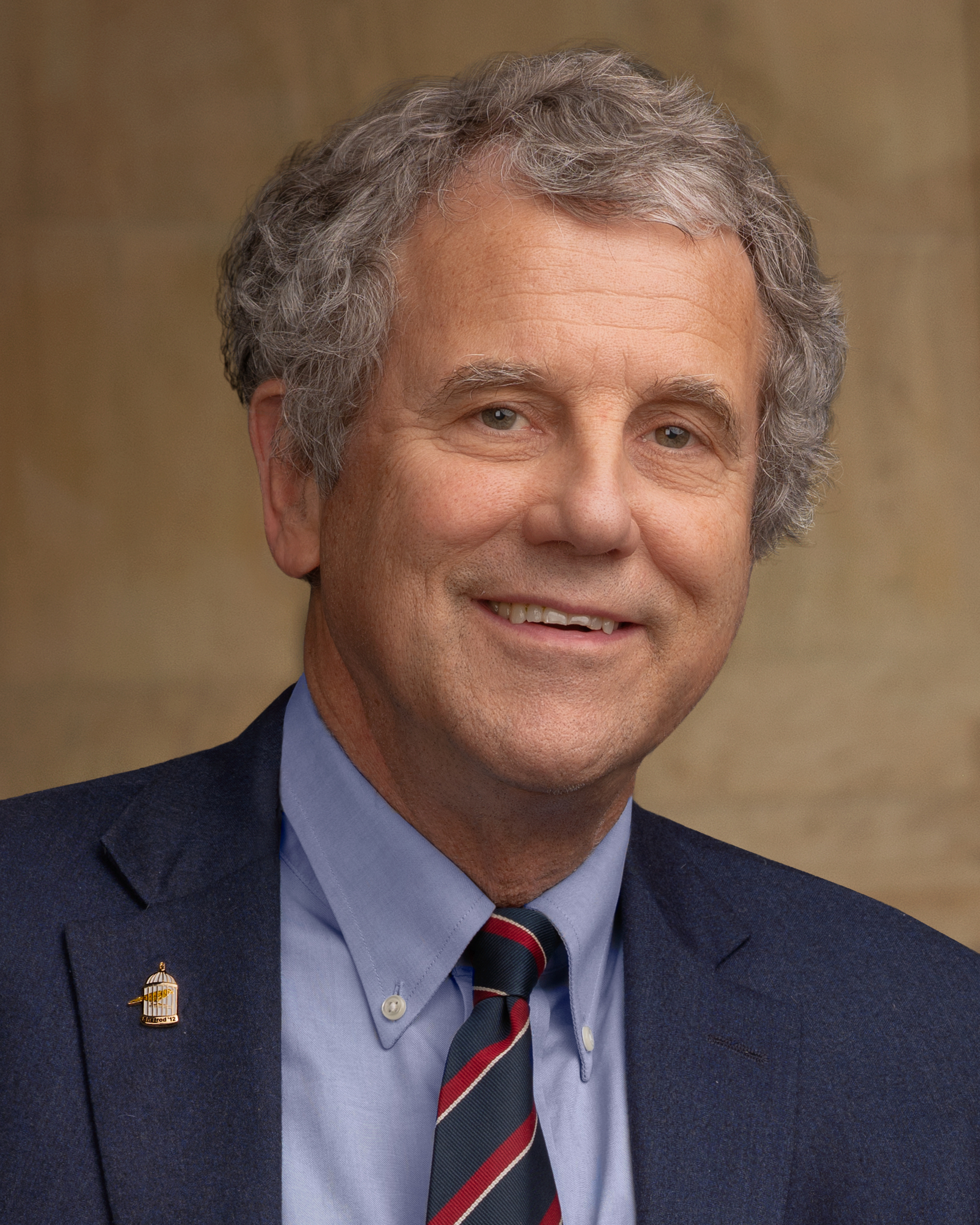

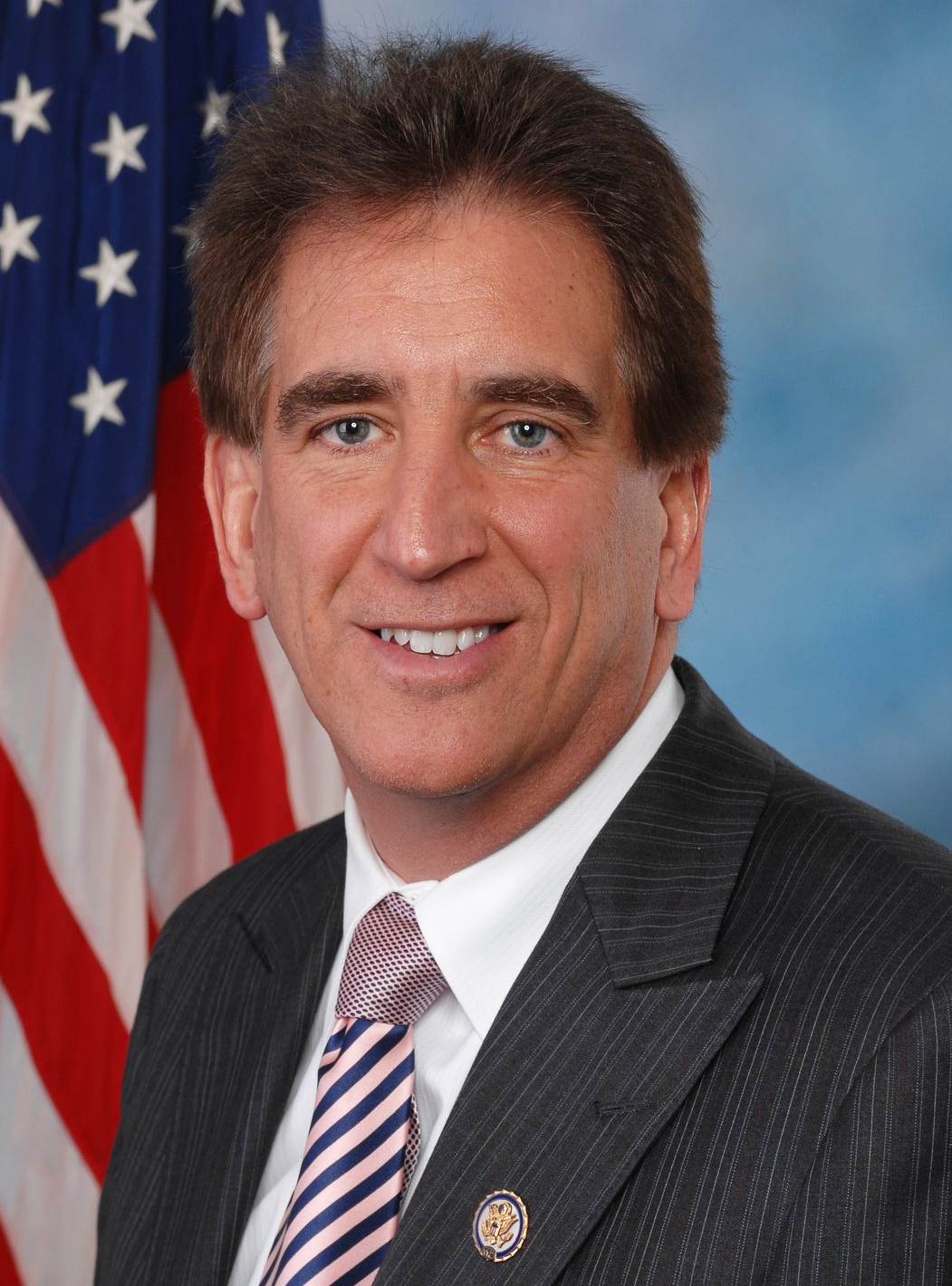
Nominee	Sherrod Brown	Jim Renacci
Party	Democratic	Republican
Popular vote	2,358,508	2,057,559
Percentage	53.40%	46.58%
- Brown: 50–60% 60–70% 70–80% Renacci: 50–60% 60–70% 70–80%
U.S. senator before election
Sherrod Brown
Democratic
Elected U.S. senator
Sherrod Brown
Democratic

Two-term Democrat Sherrod Brown was re-elected with 51% of the vote in 2012. He ran and was unopposed in Democratic primary.

U.S. Representative Jim Renacci ran for and won the Republican nomination in the May 8 primary. Other Republicans who ran include investment banker Michael Gibbons, businesswoman Melissa Ackison, Dan Kiley, and Don Elijah Eckhart.

Brown won re-election, defeating Renacci. Brown was the only non-judicial statewide Democrat in Ohio to win in 2018.

Ohio Democratic primary
Party	Candidate	Votes	%
Democratic	Sherrod Brown (incumbent)	613,373	100.00
Total votes		613,373	100.00

Ohio Republican primary
Party	Candidate	Votes	%
Republican	Jim Renacci	363,622	47.34
Republican	Mike Gibbons	243,426	31.69
Republican	Melissa Ackison	100,543	13.09
Republican	Dan Kiley	30,684	3.99
Republican	Don Elijah Eckhart	29,796	3.88
Write-in		78	0.01
Total votes		768,149	100.00

Ohio general election
Party	Candidate	Votes	%	±%
Democratic	Sherrod Brown (incumbent)	2,358,508	53.40%	+2.70%
Republican	Jim Renacci	2,057,559	46.58%	+1.88%
Write-in		1,017	0.02%	N/A
Total votes		4,417,084	100.00%	N/A
Democratic hold				

== Pennsylvania ==
Pennsylvania election
- Turnout: 58.18%
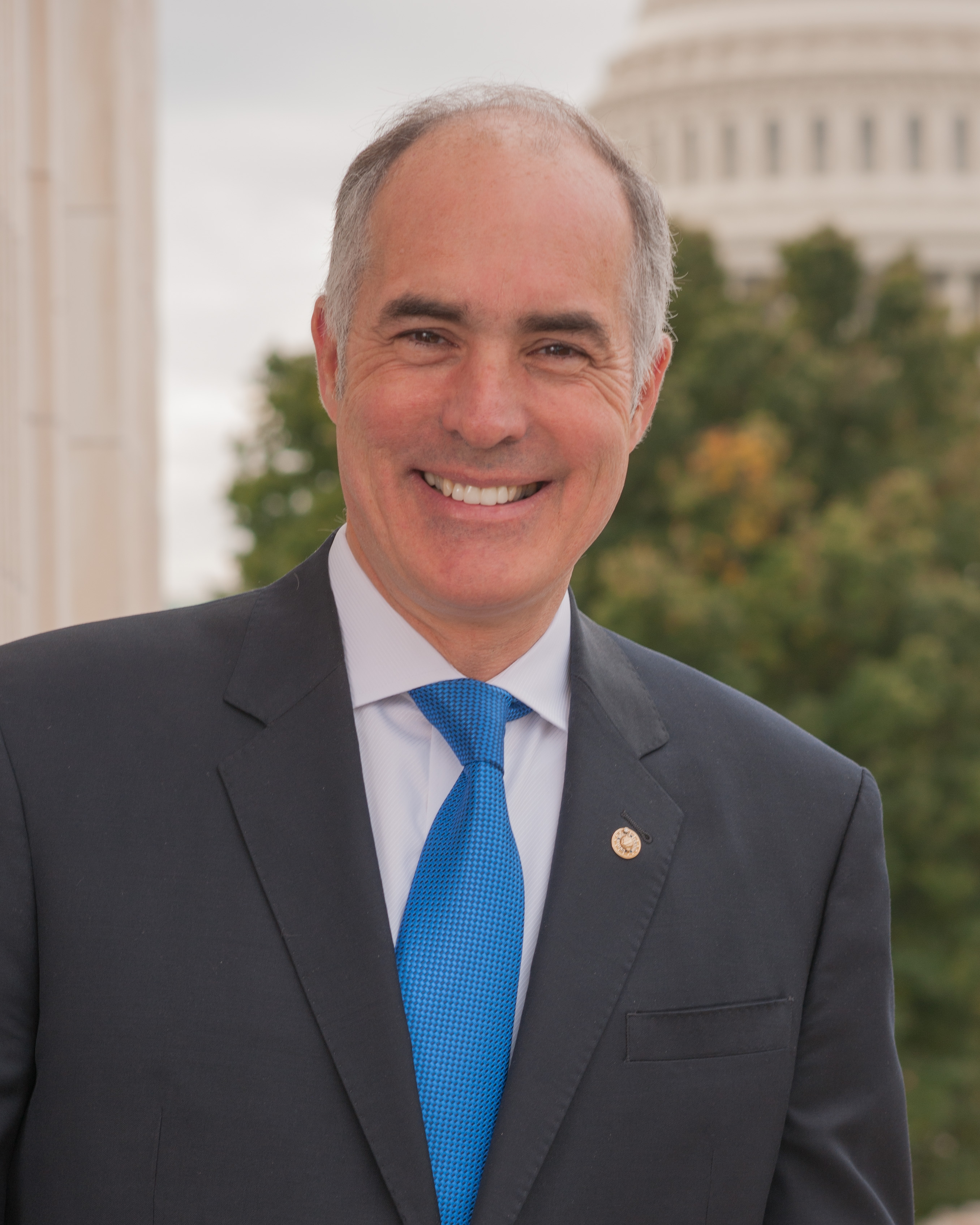

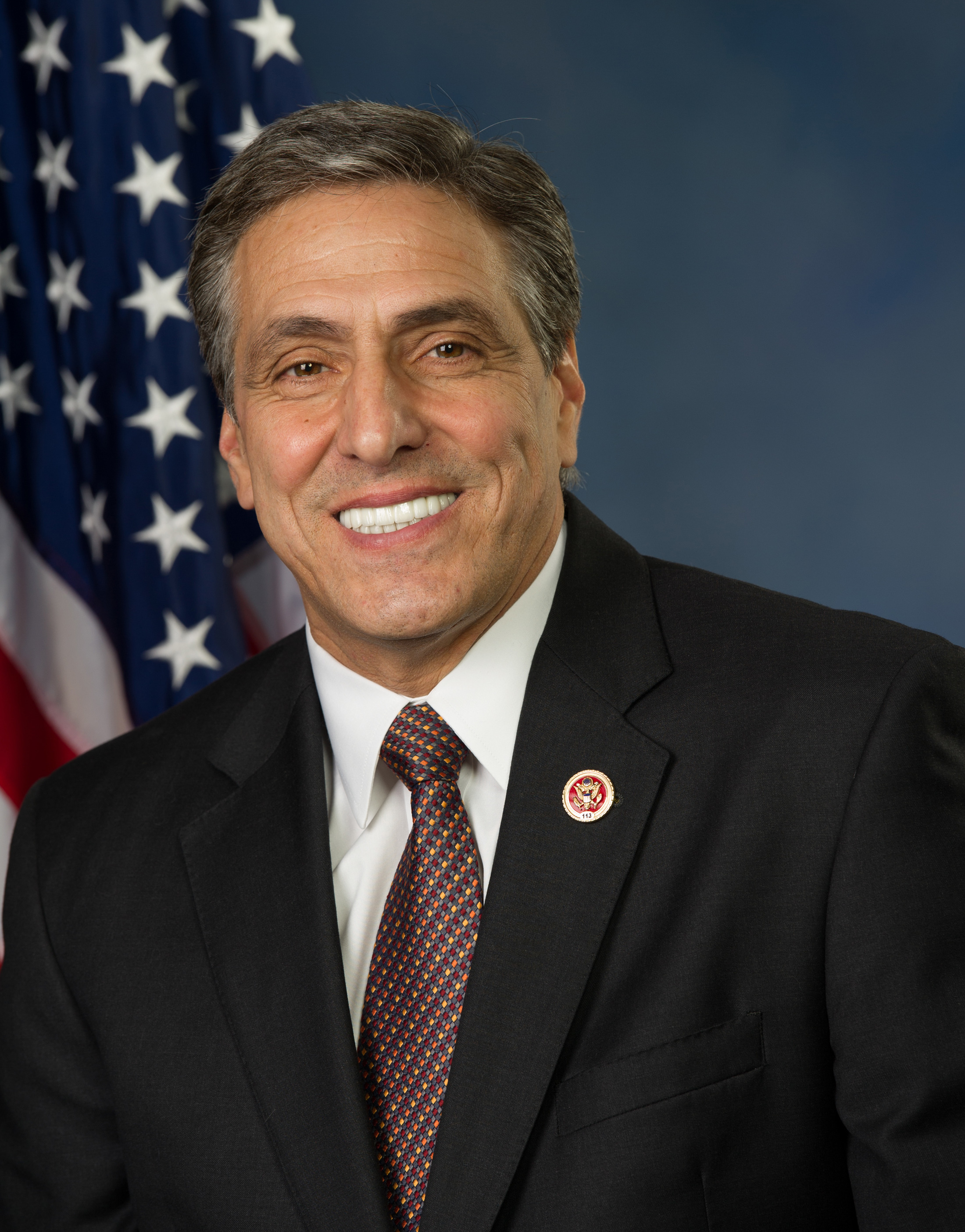
Nominee	Bob Casey Jr.	Lou Barletta
Party	Democratic	Republican
Popular vote	2,792,327	2,134,848
Percentage	55.74%	42.62%
- Casey: 50–60% 60–70% 80–90% Barletta: 50–60% 60–70% 70–80%
U.S. senator before election
Bob Casey Jr.
Democratic
Elected U.S. senator
Bob Casey Jr.
Democratic

Two-term Democrat Bob Casey Jr. was re-elected with 54% of the vote in 2012. He ran and won the Democratic primary unopposed.

U.S. Representative Lou Barletta ran for and won the Republican nomination in the May 15 primary. Jim Christiana also ran for the Republican nomination.

Casey was easily re-elected.

Pennsylvania Democratic primary
Party	Candidate	Votes	%
Democratic	Bob Casey Jr. (incumbent)	752,008	99.13
Write-in		6,584	0.87
Total votes		758,592	100.00

Pennsylvania Republican primary
Party	Candidate	Votes	%
Republican	Lou Barletta	433,312	62.80
Republican	Jim Christiana	254,118	36.83
Write-in		2,553	0.37
Total votes		689,983	100.00

Pennsylvania general election
Party	Candidate	Votes	%	±%
Democratic	Bob Casey Jr. (incumbent)	2,792,437	55.73%	+2.04
Republican	Lou Barletta	2,134,848	42.60%	–1.99
Libertarian	Dale Kerns	50,907	1.02%	–0.70
Green	Neal Gale	31,208	0.62%	N/A
Write-in		1,568	0.03%	N/A
Total votes		5,010,968	100.00%	
Democratic hold				

== Rhode Island ==
Rhode Island election
- Turnout: 47.69%
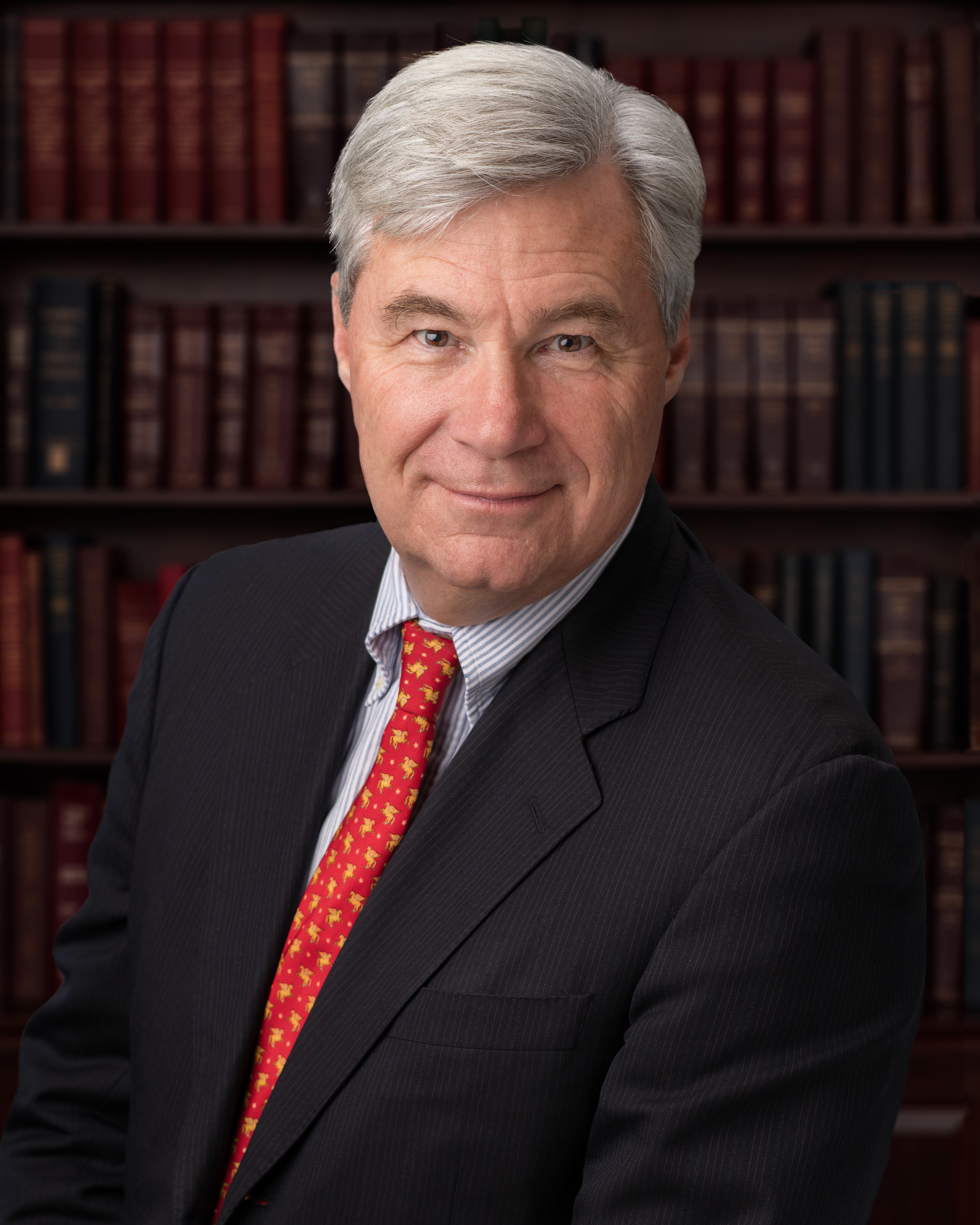

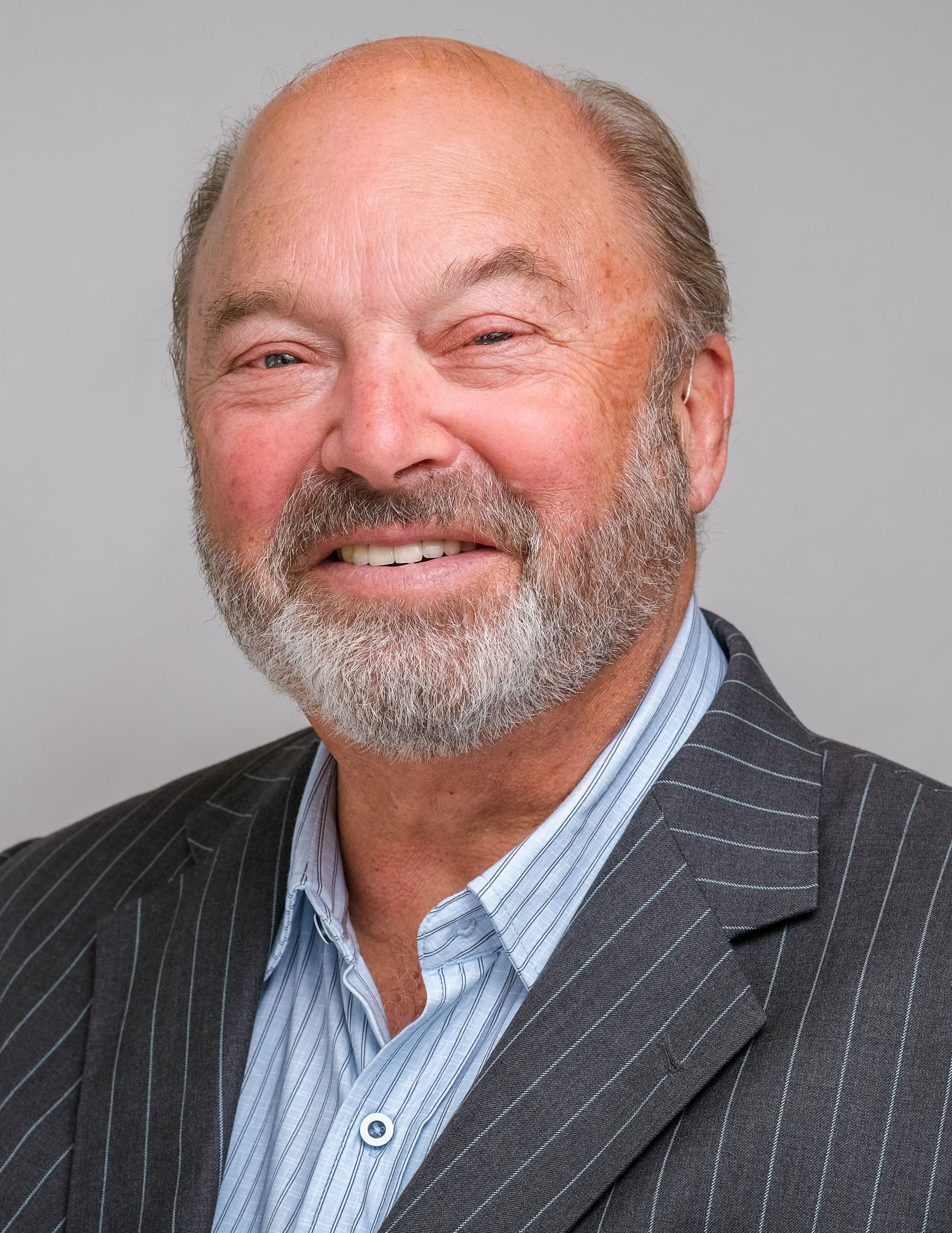
Nominee	Sheldon Whitehouse	Robert Flanders
Party	Democratic	Republican
Popular vote	231,477	144,421
Percentage	61.44%	38.33%
- Whitehouse: 50–60% 60–70% 70–80% 80–90% Flanders: 50–60%
U.S. senator before election
Sheldon Whitehouse
Democratic
Elected U.S. senator
Sheldon Whitehouse
Democratic

Two-term Democrat Sheldon Whitehouse was re-elected with 64% of the vote in 2012. He ran for reelection.

Former Rhode Island Supreme Court Associate Justice Robert Flanders was the Republican nominee.

Whitehouse was elected to a third term by a wide margin.

Rhode Island Democratic primary
Party	Candidate	Votes	%
Democratic	Sheldon Whitehouse (incumbent)	89,140	76.79
Democratic	Patricia Fontes	26,947	23.21
Total votes		116,087	100.00

Rhode Island Republican primary
Party	Candidate	Votes	%
Republican	Robert Flanders	26,543	87.70
Republican	Rocky De La Fuente	3,722	12.30
Total votes		30,265	100.00

Rhode Island general election
Party	Candidate	Votes	%	±%
Democratic	Sheldon Whitehouse (incumbent)	231,477	61.44%	–3.37
Republican	Robert Flanders	144,421	38.33%	+3.36
Write-in		840	0.22%	±0.00
Total votes		376,738	100.00%	
Democratic hold				

== Tennessee ==
Tennessee election
- November 6, 2018
- Turnout: 54.46% ▼7.4 pp
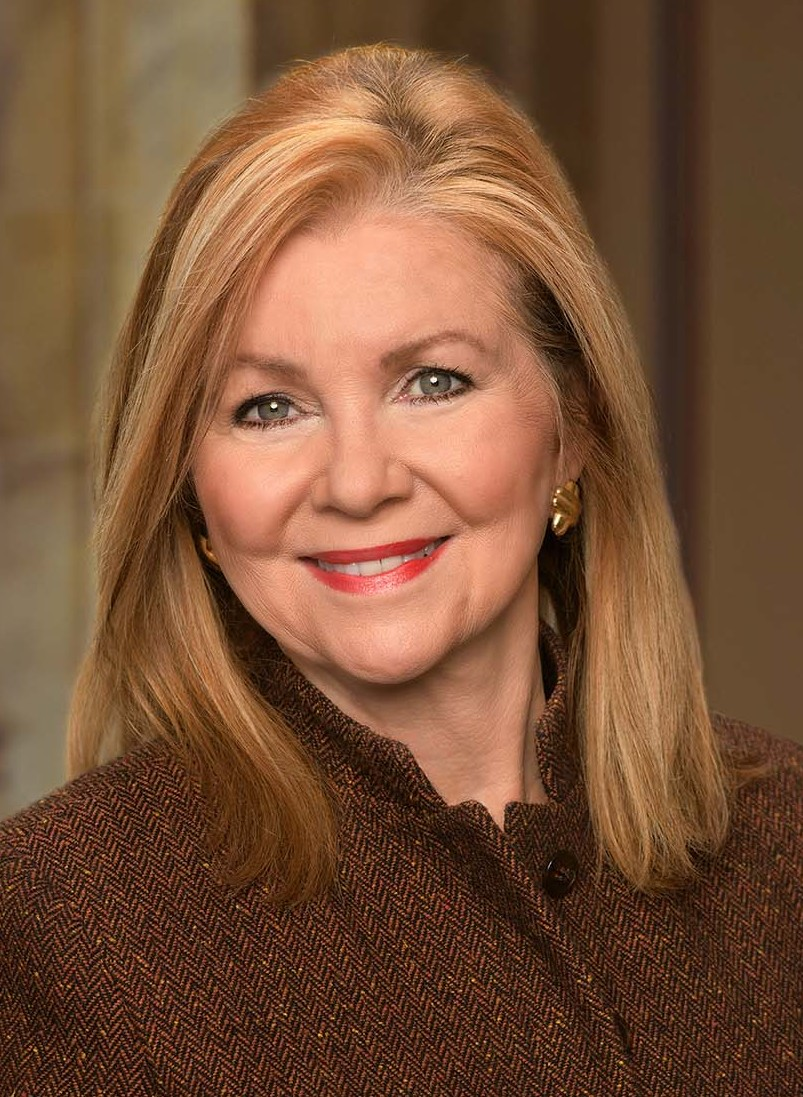

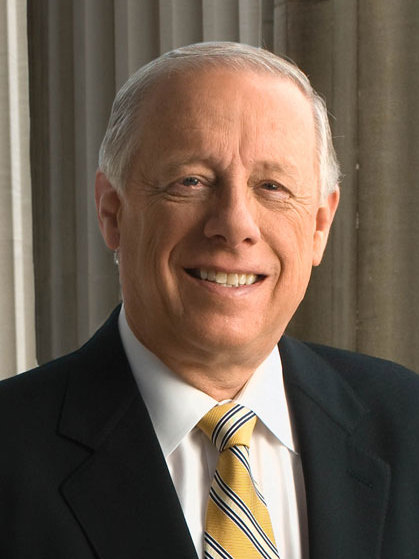
Nominee	Marsha Blackburn	Phil Bredesen
Party	Republican	Democratic
Popular vote	1,227,483	985,450
Percentage	54.71%	43.92%
- Blackburn: 40–50% 50–60% 60–70% 70–80% 80–90% >90% Bredesen: 40–50% 50–60% 60–70% 70–80% 80–90% >90% Tie: 50% No data
U.S. senator before election
Bob Corker
Republican
Elected U.S. Senator
Marsha Blackburn
Republican

Two-term Republican Bob Corker was re-elected with 65% of the vote in 2012. Senator Corker filed his Statement of Candidacy with the Secretary of the U.S. Senate to run for re-election, but on September 26, 2017, Senator Corker announced his intent to retire.

Aaron Pettigrew and Republican U.S. Representative Marsha Blackburn ran for the Republican nomination. Marsha Blackburn became the Republican nominee.

Former Tennessee Governor Phil Bredesen became the Democratic nominee.

Tennessee Republican primary
Party	Candidate	Votes	%
Republican	Marsha Blackburn	613,513	84.48
Republican	Aaron Pettigrew	112,705	15.52
Write-in		13	0.00
Total votes		726,231	100.00

Tennessee Democratic primary
Party	Candidate	Votes	%
Democratic	Phil Bredesen	349,718	91.51
Democratic	Gary Davis	20,170	5.28
Democratic	John Wolfe Jr.	12,269	3.21
Total votes		382,157	100.00

Tennessee general election
Party	Candidate	Votes	%	±%
Republican	Marsha Blackburn	1,227,483	54.71%	−10.18%
Democratic	Phil Bredesen	985,450	43.92%	+13.51%
Independent	Trudy Austin	9,455	0.42%	N/A
Independent	Dean Hill	8,717	0.39%	N/A
Independent	Kris L. Todd	5,084	0.23%	N/A
Independent	John Carico	3,398	0.15%	N/A
Independent	Breton Phillips	2,226	0.10%	N/A
Independent	Kevin Lee McCants	1,927	0.09%	N/A
Total votes		2,243,740	100.00%	N/A
Republican hold				

== Texas ==
Texas election
- November 6, 2018
- Turnout: 53.01% (of registered voters); 42.07% (of voting age population)
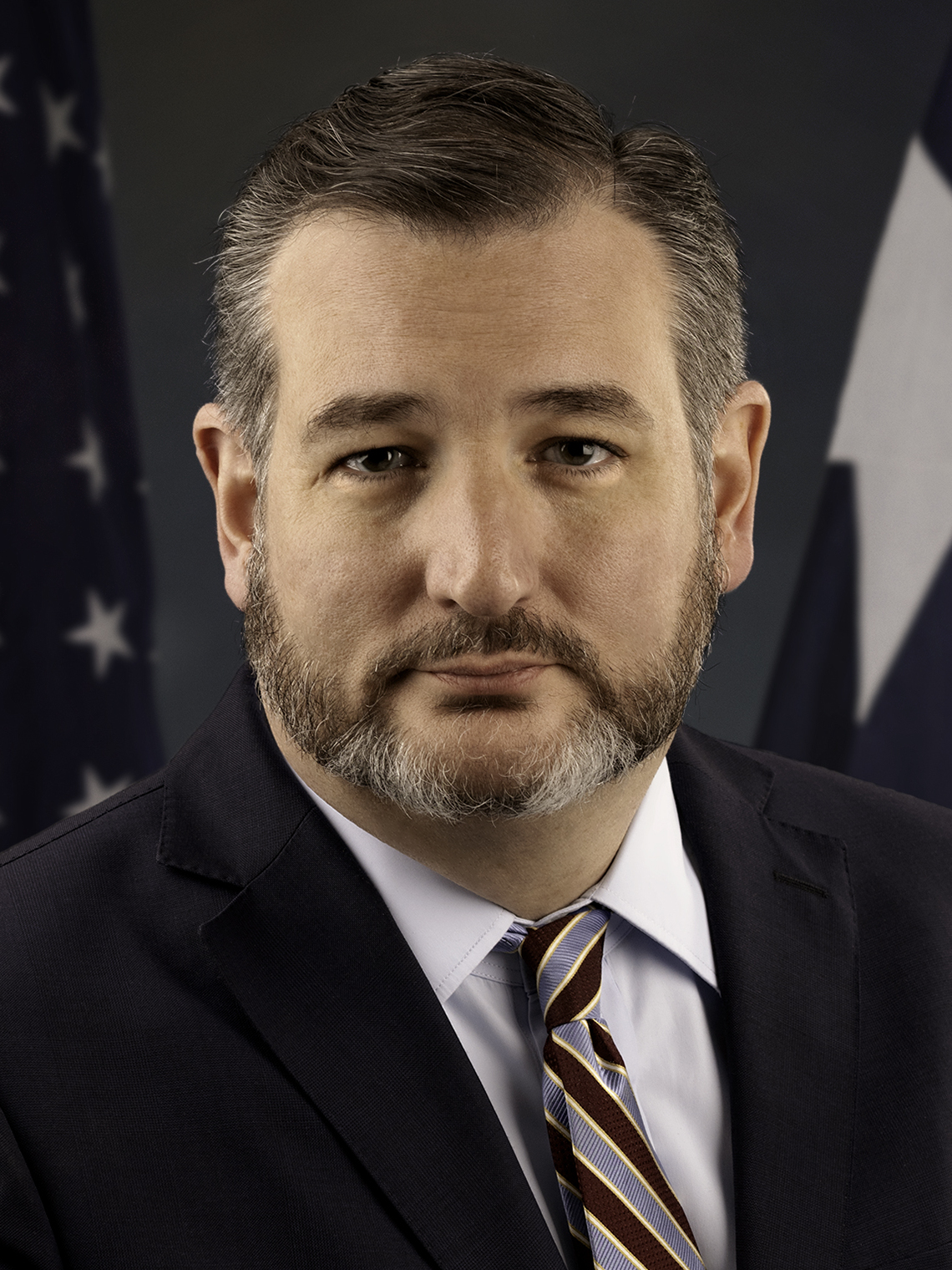

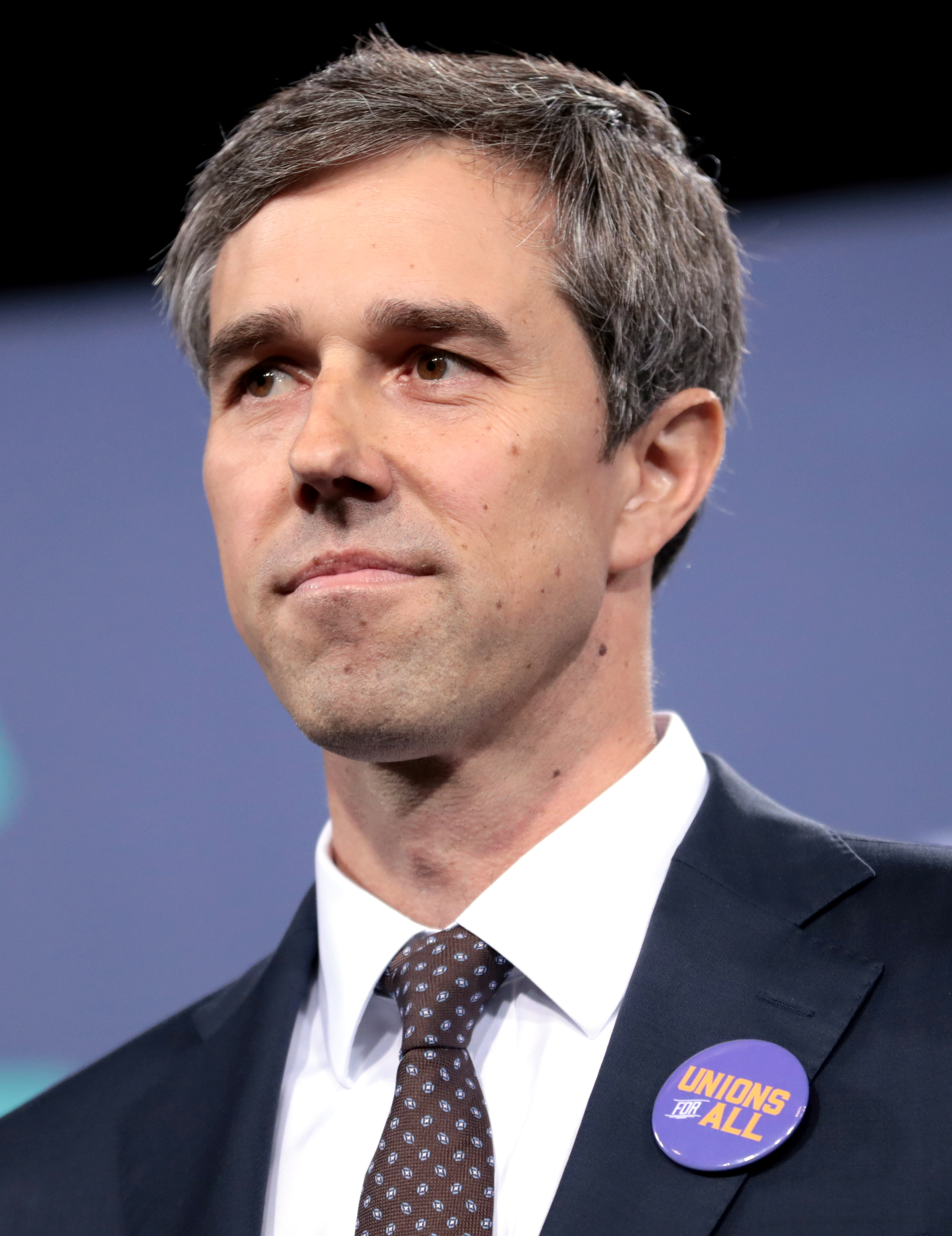
Nominee	Ted Cruz	Beto O'Rourke
Party	Republican	Democratic
Popular vote	4,260,373	4,045,632
Percentage	50.89%	48.33%
- Cruz: 40–50% 50–60% 60–70% 70–80% 80–90% >90% O'Rourke: 40–50% 50–60% 60–70% 70–80% 80–90% >90% No data
U.S. senator before election
Ted Cruz
Republican
Elected U.S. Senator
Ted Cruz
Republican

One-term Republican Ted Cruz was elected with 57% of the vote in 2012. He overwhelmingly won the Republican primary on March 6, 2018. Television producer Bruce Jacobson, Houston energy attorney Stefano de Stefano, former mayor of La Marque Geraldine Sam, Mary Miller, and Thomas Dillingham were Cruz's opponents.

U.S. Representative Beto O'Rourke won the Democratic nomination on March 6, 2018. Other Democrats who ran include Irasema Ramirez Hernandez and Edward Kimbrough.

Nurse Carl Bible ran as an independent. Bob McNeil ran as the candidate of the American Citizen Party. Neal Dikeman was the Libertarian nominee.

O'Rourke ran a strong campaign, creating a close race in what has traditionally been a Republican stronghold. Nevertheless, Cruz was narrowly re-elected to a second term.

Texas Republican primary
Party	Candidate	Votes	%
Republican	Ted Cruz (incumbent)	1,322,724	85.36
Republican	Mary Miller	94,715	6.11
Republican	Bruce Jacobson Jr.	64,791	4.18
Republican	Stefano de Stefano	44,456	2.87
Republican	Geraldine Sam	22,887	1.48
Total votes		1,549,573	100.00

Texas Democratic primary
Party	Candidate	Votes	%
Democratic	Beto O'Rourke	644,632	61.81
Democratic	Sema Hernandez	247,424	23.72
Democratic	Edward Kimbrough	150,858	14.47
Total votes		1,042,914	100.00

Texas general election
Party	Candidate	Votes	%	±%
Republican	Ted Cruz (incumbent)	4,260,373	50.89%	–5.57
Democratic	Beto O'Rourke	4,045,632	48.33%	+7.71
Libertarian	Neal Dikeman	65,470	0.78%	–1.28
Total votes		8,371,475	100.00%	
Republican hold				

== Utah ==
Utah election
- Turnout: 74.15%
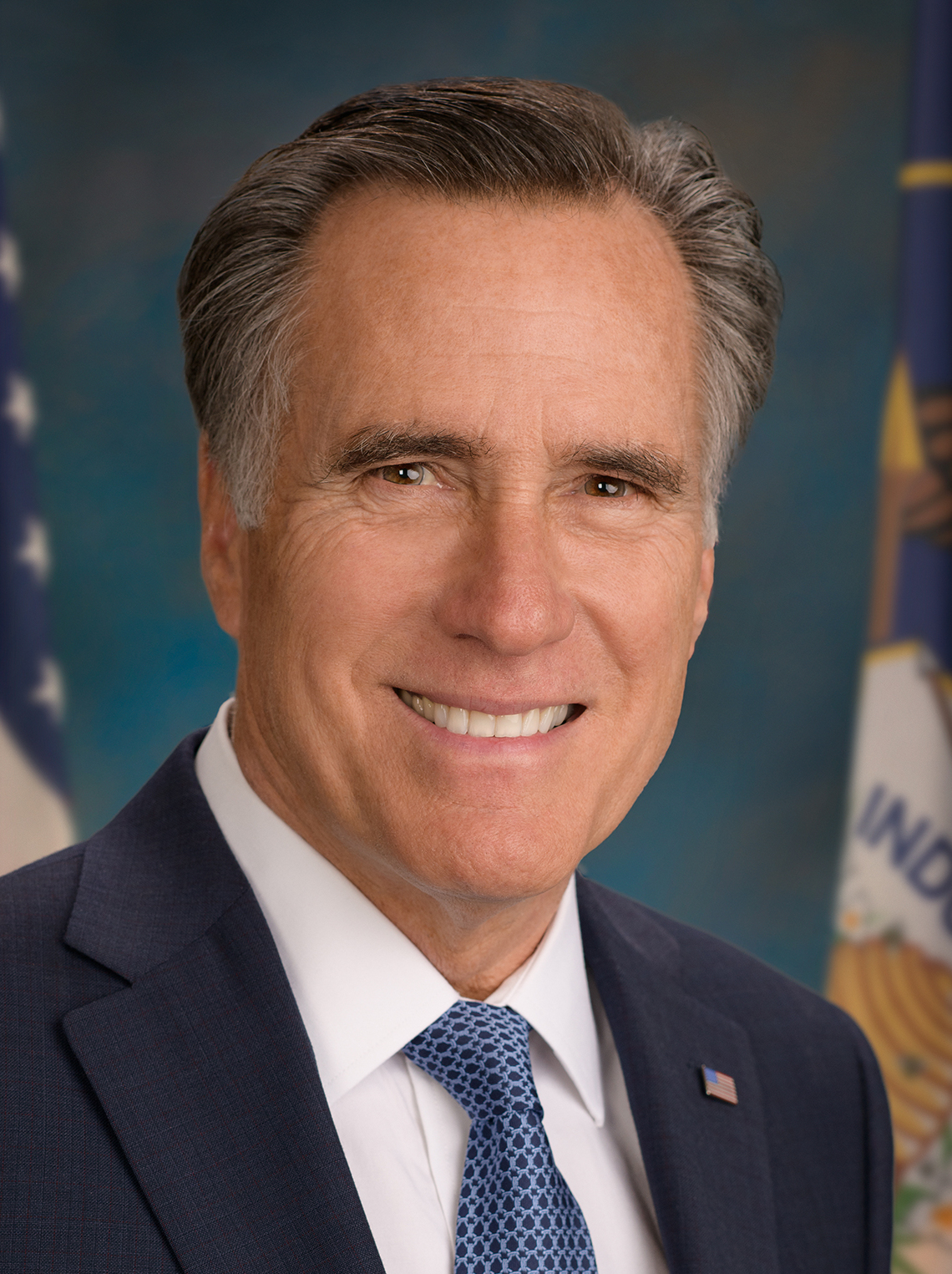

Nominee	Mitt Romney	Jenny Wilson
Party	Republican	Democratic
Popular vote	665,215	328,541
Percentage	62.59%	30.91%
- Romney: 50–60% 60–70% 70–80% 80–90% Wilson: 40–50% 50–60%
U.S. senator before election
Orrin Hatch
Republican
Elected U.S. senator
Mitt Romney
Republican

Seven-term Republican Orrin Hatch was re-elected with 65% of the vote in 2012. Hatch was the President pro tempore of the United States Senate, as well as the second most-senior Senator. Before the 2012 election, Hatch said that he would retire at the end of his seventh term if he was re-elected. Hatch initially announced his re-election campaign on March 9, 2017, but later announced his plans to retire on January 2, 2018. Former 2012 Republican presidential nominee Mitt Romney was running for the seat.

Professor James Singer was running for the Democratic nomination, but he dropped out and endorsed Salt Lake County Councilwoman Jenny Wilson, who made her Senate bid official on July 17, 2017. Danny Drew was also running, but dropped out and endorsed Wilson. Mitchell Kent Vice was defeated for the Democratic nomination by Wilson.

Mitt Romney was easily elected, defeating Wilson.

Utah Republican primary
Party	Candidate	Votes	%
Republican	Mitt Romney	240,021	71.27
Republican	Mike Kennedy	96,771	28.73
Total votes		336,792	100.00

Utah general election
Party	Candidate	Votes	%	±%
Republican	Mitt Romney	665,215	62.59%	–2.72
Democratic	Jenny Wilson	328,541	30.91%	+0.93
Constitution	Tim Aalders	28,774	2.71%	–0.46
Libertarian	Craig Bowden	27,607	2.60%	N/A
Independent American	Reed McCandless	12,708	1.20%	N/A
Write-in		52	0.00%	±0.00
Total votes		1,062,897	100.00%	
Republican hold				

== Vermont ==
Vermont election
- Turnout: 55.57%
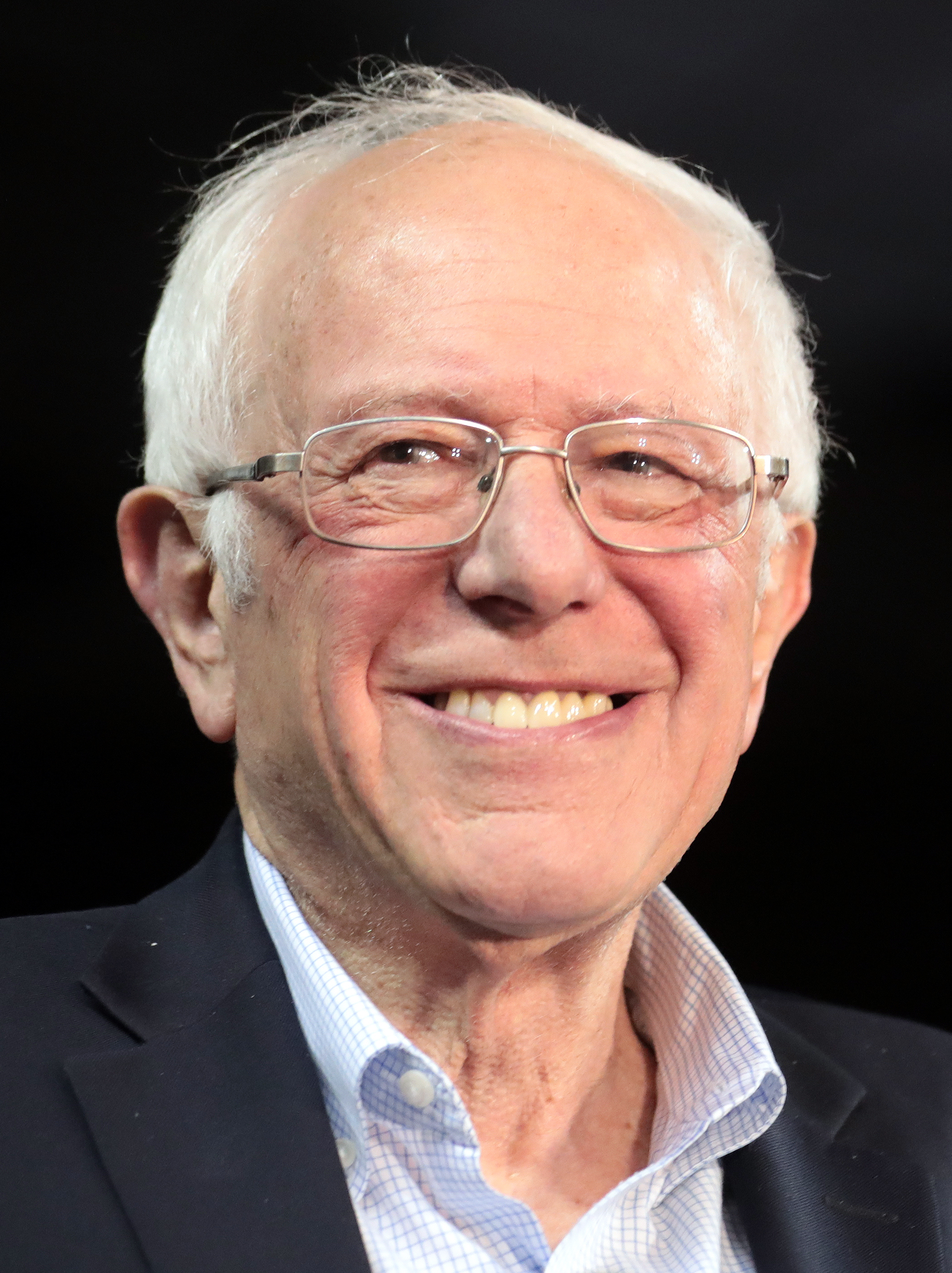

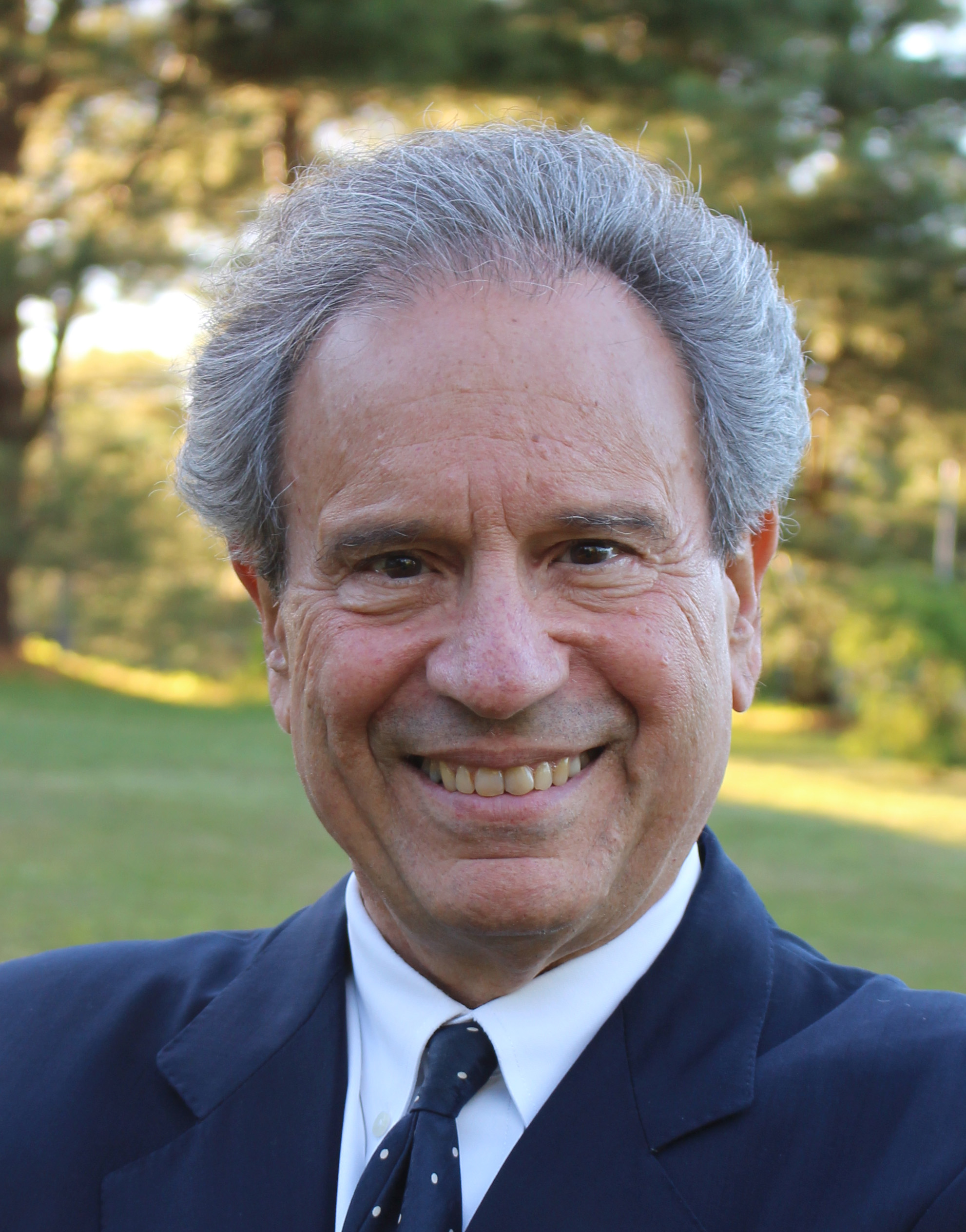
Nominee	Bernie Sanders	Lawrence Zupan
Party	Independent	Republican
Popular vote	183,649	74,815
Percentage	67.44%	27.47%
- Sanders: 40–50% 50–60% 60–70% 70–80% 80–90% Zupan: 40–50% 50–60% Tie: 40–50%
U.S. senator before election
Bernie Sanders
Independent
Elected U.S. senator
Bernie Sanders
Independent

Two-term Independent Senator Bernie Sanders was re-elected with 71% of the vote in 2012. Sanders, one of two independent members of Congress, has caucused with the Democratic Party since taking office in 2007. In November 2015, Sanders announced his plans to run as a Democrat, rather than an independent, in all future elections. He won the nomination easily.

Sanders easily won election to a third term.

Vermont Democratic primary
Party	Candidate	Votes	%
Democratic	Bernie Sanders (incumbent)	63,683	94.02
Democratic	Folsade Adeluola	3,766	5.56
Write-in		281	0.41
Total votes		67,730	100.00

Vermont Republican primary
Party	Candidate	Votes	%
Republican	H. Brooke Paige	9,805	37.37
Republican	Lawrence Zupan	9,383	35.86
Republican	Jasdeep Pannu	4,527	17.30
Write-in	Bernie Sanders (incumbent)	1,081	4.13
Republican	Rocky De La Fuente	1,057	4.04
Write-in		314	1.20
Total votes		26,167	100.00

Vermont general election
Party	Candidate	Votes	%	±%
Independent	Bernie Sanders (incumbent)	183,649	67.36%	–3.64
Republican	Lawrence Zupan	74,815	27.44%	+2.54
Independent	Brad Peacock	3,665	1.34%	N/A
Independent	Russell Beste	2,763	1.01%	N/A
Independent	Edward Gilbert Jr.	2,244	0.82%	N/A
Independent	Folasade Adeluola	1,979	0.73%	N/A
Liberty Union	Reid Kane	1,171	0.43%	–0.43
Independent	Jon Svitavsky	1,130	0.41%	N/A
Independent	Bruce Busa	914	0.34%	N/A
Write-in		294	0.11%	+0.03
Total votes		272,624	100.00%	
Independent hold				

== Virginia ==
Virginia election
- Turnout: 59.14%
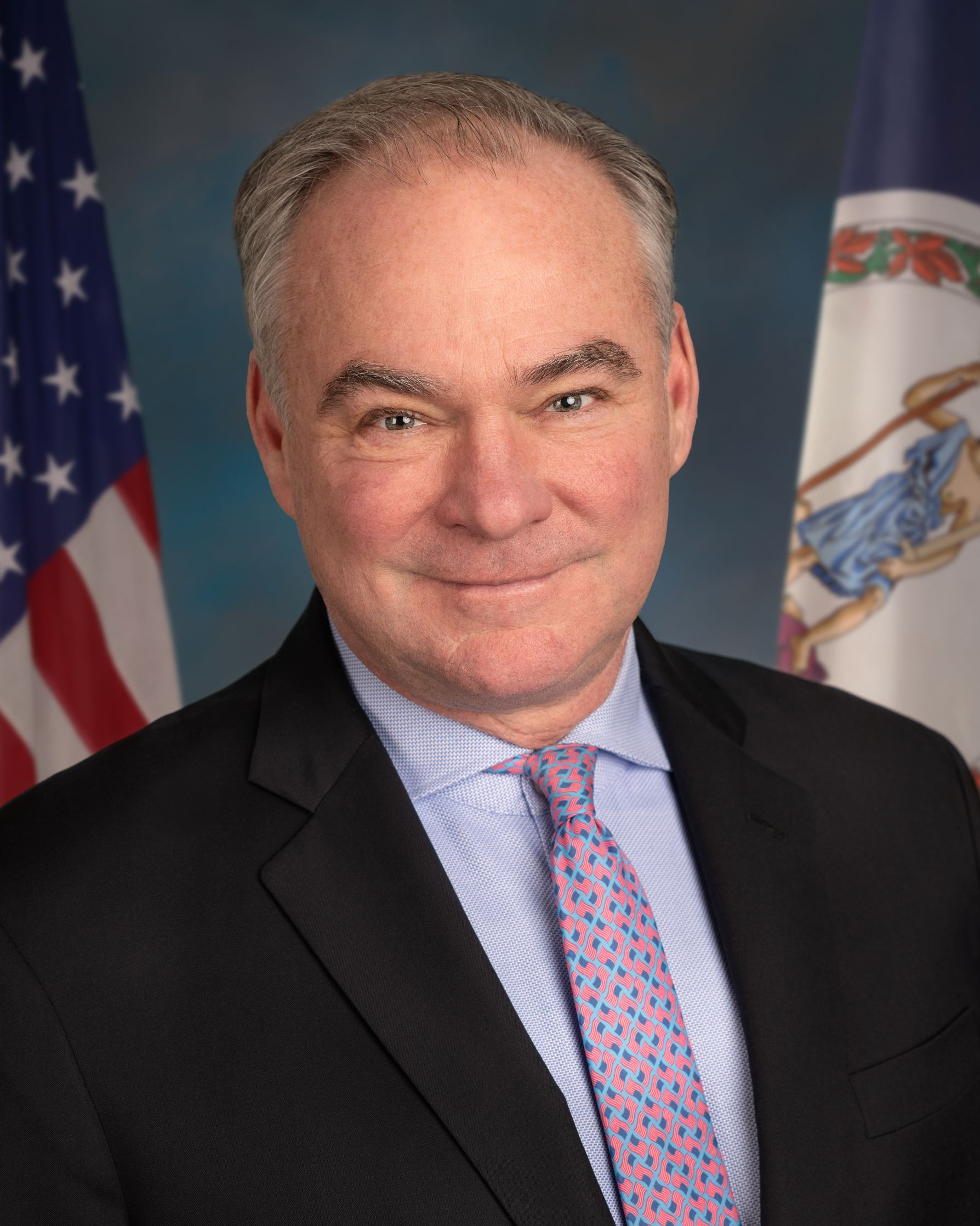

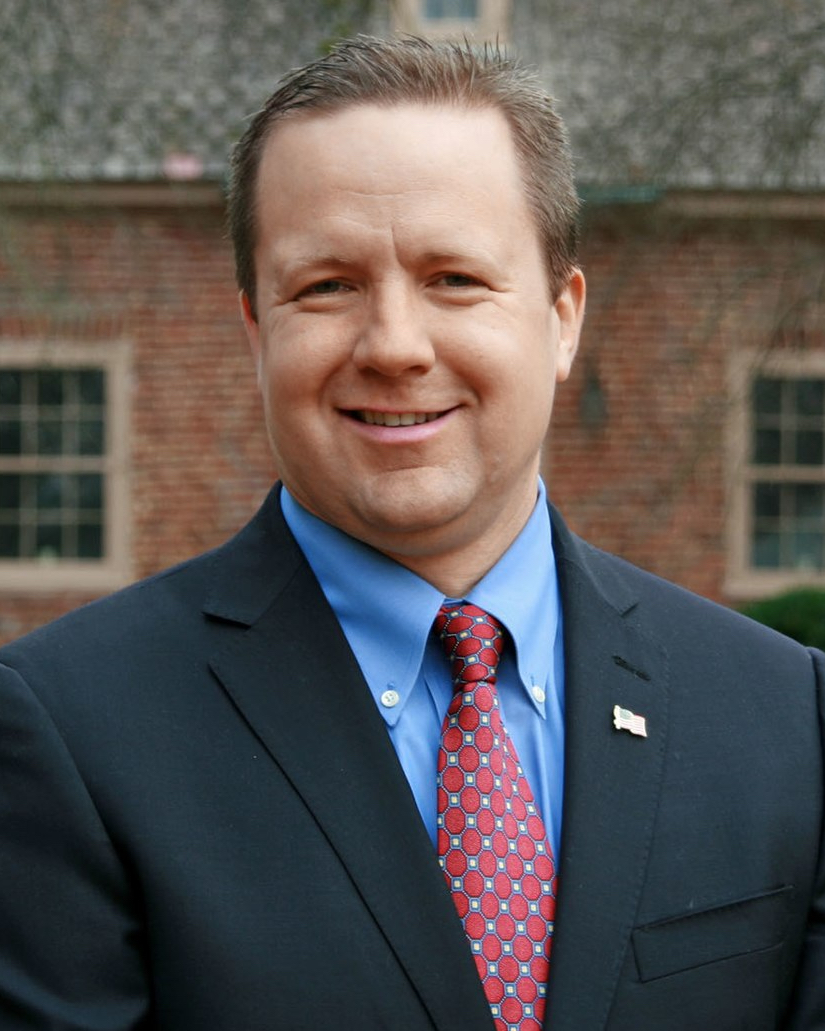
Nominee	Tim Kaine	Corey Stewart
Party	Democratic	Republican
Popular vote	1,910,370	1,374,313
Percentage	57.00%	41.00%
- Kaine: 40–50% 50–60% 60–70% 70–80% 80–90% Stewart: 50–60% 60–70% 70–80%
U.S. senator before election
Tim Kaine
Democratic
Elected U.S. senator
Tim Kaine
Democratic

One-term Democrat Tim Kaine was elected with 53% of the vote in 2012. He was re-nominated unopposed. Prince William County Supervisor Corey Stewart was the Republican nominee. Matt Waters was the Libertarian nominee. Kaine defeated Stewart with 57% of the vote. Stewart received 41% of the vote.

Virginia Republican primary
Party	Candidate	Votes	%
Republican	Corey Stewart	136,610	44.86
Republican	Nick Freitas	131,321	43.12
Republican	E. W. Jackson	36,508	11.99
Write-in		79	0.03
Total votes		304,518	100.00

Virginia general election
Party	Candidate	Votes	%	±%
Democratic	Tim Kaine (incumbent)	1,910,370	57.00%	+4.17
Republican	Corey Stewart	1,374,313	41.00%	–5.92
Libertarian	Matt Waters	61,565	1.84%	N/A
Write-in		5,509	0.16%	–0.09
Total votes		3,351,757	100.00%	
Democratic hold				

== Washington ==
Washington election
- Turnout: 70.74%
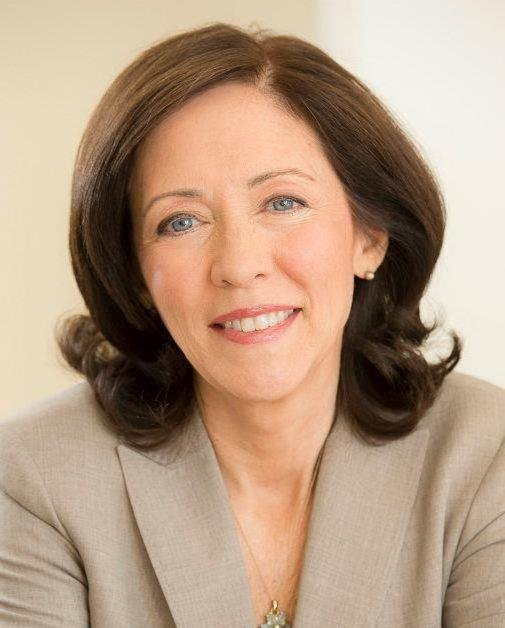

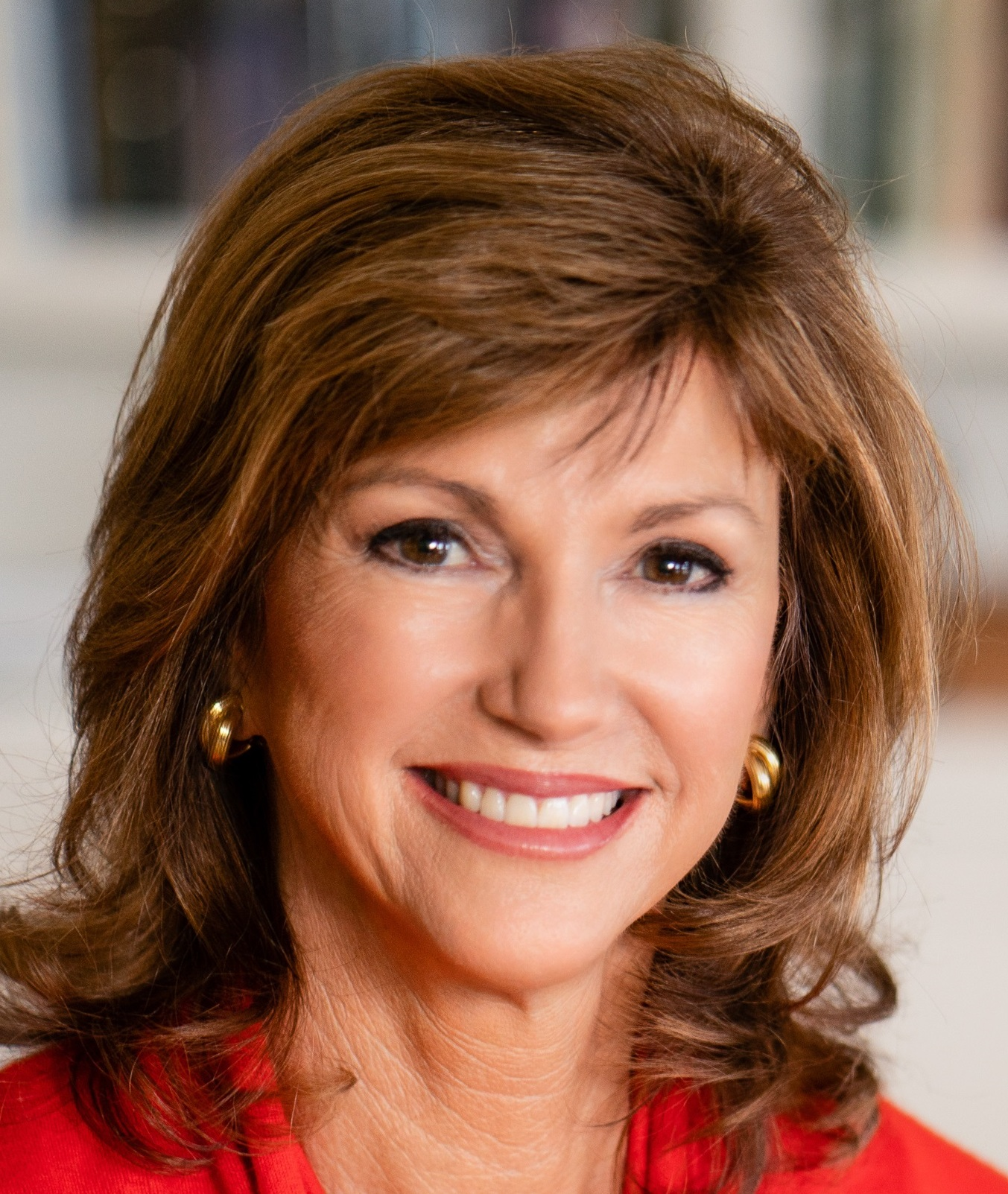
Nominee	Maria Cantwell	Susan Hutchison
Party	Democratic	Republican
Popular vote	1,803,364	1,282,804
Percentage	58.4%	41.6%
- Cantwell: 50–60% 60–70% 70–80% Hutchison: 50–60% 60–70% 70–80%
U.S. senator before election
Maria Cantwell
Democratic
Elected U.S. senator
Maria Cantwell
Democratic

Three-term Democrat Maria Cantwell was re-elected with 61% of the vote in 2012. She ran for reelection.

Washington holds non-partisan blanket primaries, in which the top two finishers advance to the general election regardless of party. Cantwell and former state Republican Party chair Susan Hutchison faced each other in November.

Cantwell won re-election by a large margin.

Washington blanket primary
Party	Candidate	Votes	%
Democratic	Maria Cantwell (incumbent)	929,961	54.68
Republican	Susan Hutchison	413,317	24.30
Republican	Keith Swank	39,818	2.34
Republican	Joey Gibson	38,676	2.27
Democratic	Clint Tannehill	35,770	2.10
Republican	Dave Bryant	33,962	2.00
Republican	Art Coday	30,654	1.80
Independent	Jennifer Ferguson	25,224	1.48
Republican	Tim Owen	23,167	1.36
Republican	Matt Hawkins	13,324	0.78
Democratic	Don Rivers	12,634	0.74
Libertarian	Mike Luke	12,302	0.72
Republican	Glen Stockwell	11,611	0.68
Independent	Thor Amundson	9,393	0.55
Democratic	Mohammad Said	8,649	0.51
Republican	Matthew Heines	7,737	0.45
Freedom Socialist	Steve Hoffman	7,390	0.43
Republican	Goodspaceguy	7,057	0.41
Republican	John Orlinski	6,905	0.41
Independent	Dave Strider	6,821	0.40
Republican	Rocky De La Fuente	5,724	0.34
Green	James Robert Deal	3,849	0.23
Independent	Sam Wright	3,761	0.22
Independent	Brad Chase	2,655	0.16
Democratic	George Kalberer	2,448	0.14
Independent	Charlie Jackson	2,411	0.14
Republican	RC Smith	2,238	0.13
Independent	Jon Butler	2,016	0.12
Independent	Alex Tsimerman	1,366	0.08
Total votes		1,700,840	100.00

Washington general election
Party	Candidate	Votes	%	±%
Democratic	Maria Cantwell (incumbent)	1,803,364	58.43%	–2.02
Republican	Susan Hutchison	1,282,804	41.57%	+2.02
Total votes		3,086,168	100.00%	
Democratic hold				

== West Virginia ==
West Virginia election
- Turnout: 47.04%
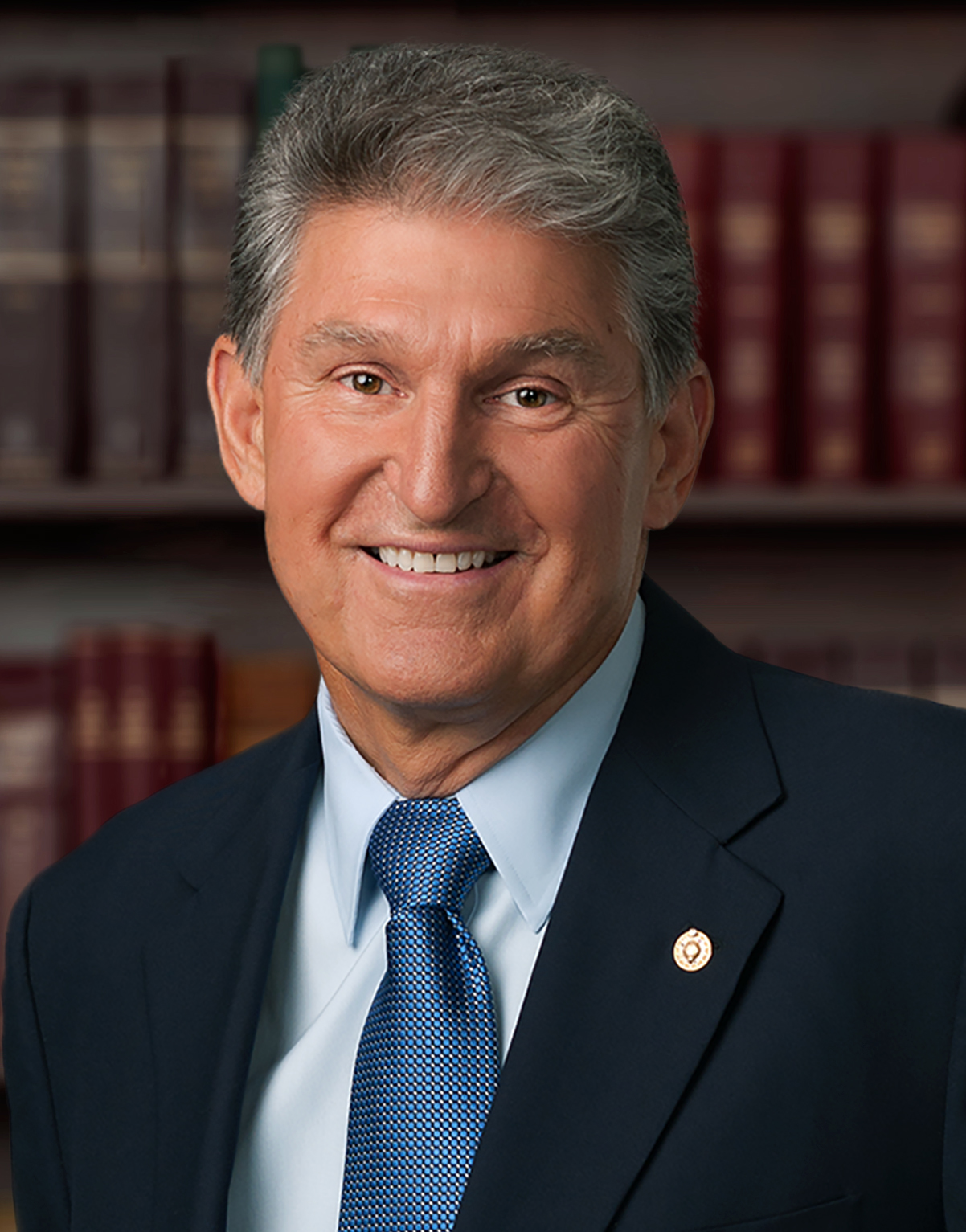

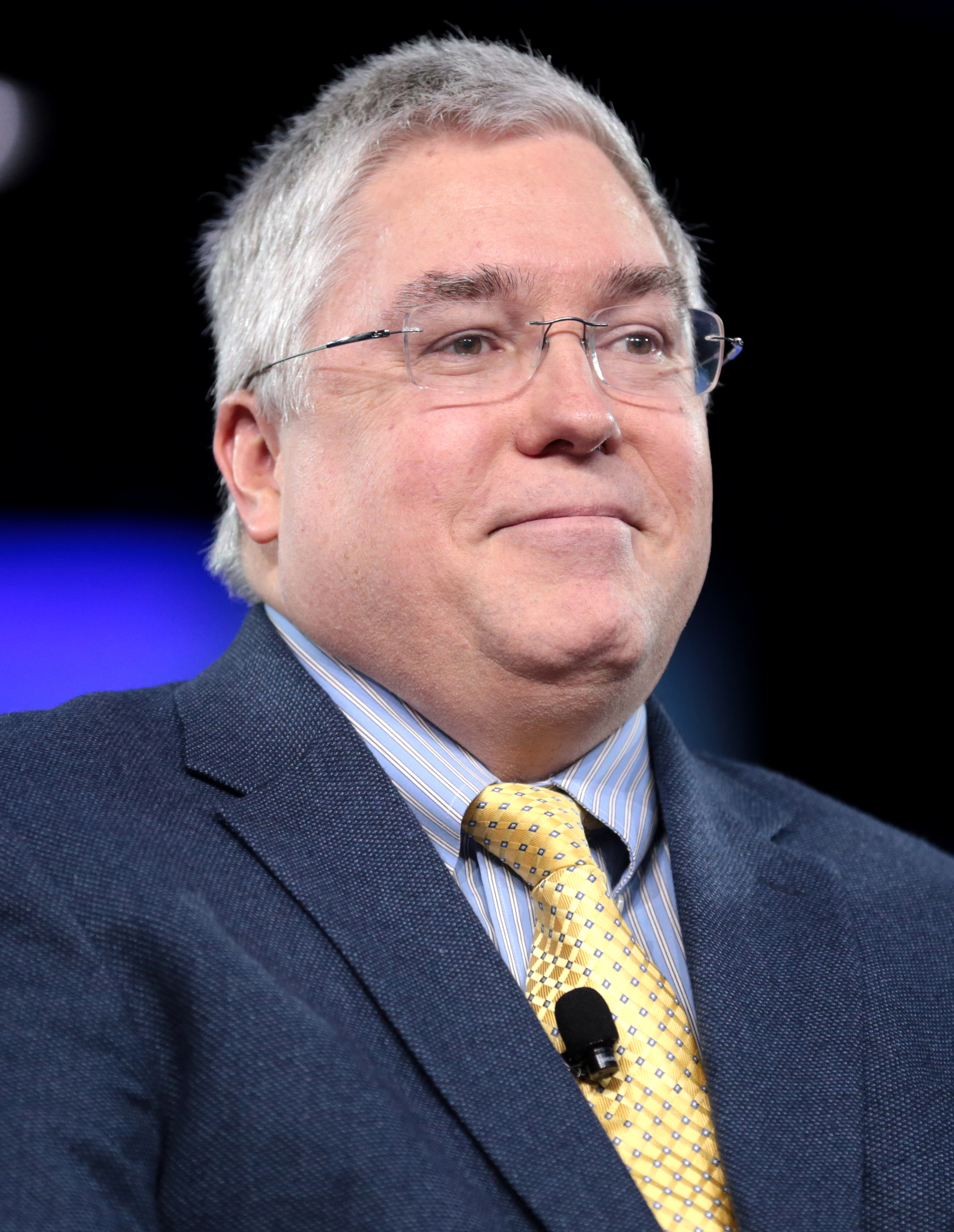
Nominee	Joe Manchin	Patrick Morrisey
Party	Democratic	Republican
Popular vote	290,510	271,113
Percentage	49.57%	46.26%
- Manchin: 40–50% 50–60% 60–70% Morrisey: 40–50% 50–60% 60–70% 70–80%
U.S. senator before election
Joe Manchin
Democratic
Elected U.S. senator
Joe Manchin
Democratic

One-term Democrat Joe Manchin was elected with 61% of the vote in 2012. He originally won the seat in a 2010 special election. Manchin ran for re-election and won the May 8 Democratic primary. Environmental activist Paula Jean Swearengin, also ran for the Democratic nomination.

West Virginia Attorney General Patrick Morrisey received the Republican nomination in the May 8 primary. Representative Evan Jenkins, coal miner Bo Copley, Jack Newbrough, Don Blankenship, and Tom Willis ran for the Republican nomination.

Despite recent Republican successes in West Virginia, Manchin was able to win re-election to a second term.

West Virginia Democratic primary
Party	Candidate	Votes	%
Democratic	Joe Manchin (incumbent)	112,658	69.86
Democratic	Paula Jean Swearengin	48,594	30.14
Total votes		161,252	100.00

West Virginia Republican primary
Party	Candidate	Votes	%
Republican	Patrick Morrisey	48,007	34.90
Republican	Evan Jenkins	40,185	29.21
Republican	Don Blankenship	27,478	19.97
Republican	Tom Willis	13,540	9.84
Republican	Bo Copley	4,248	3.09
Republican	Jack Newbrough	4,115	2.99
Total votes		137,573	100.00

West Virginia general election
Party	Candidate	Votes	%	±%
Democratic	Joe Manchin (incumbent)	290,510	49.57%	–11.00
Republican	Patrick Morrisey	271,113	46.26%	+9.79
Libertarian	Rusty Hollen	24,411	4.17%	N/A
Total votes		586,034	100.00%	
Democratic hold				

== Wisconsin ==
Wisconsin election
- Turnout: 81.81%
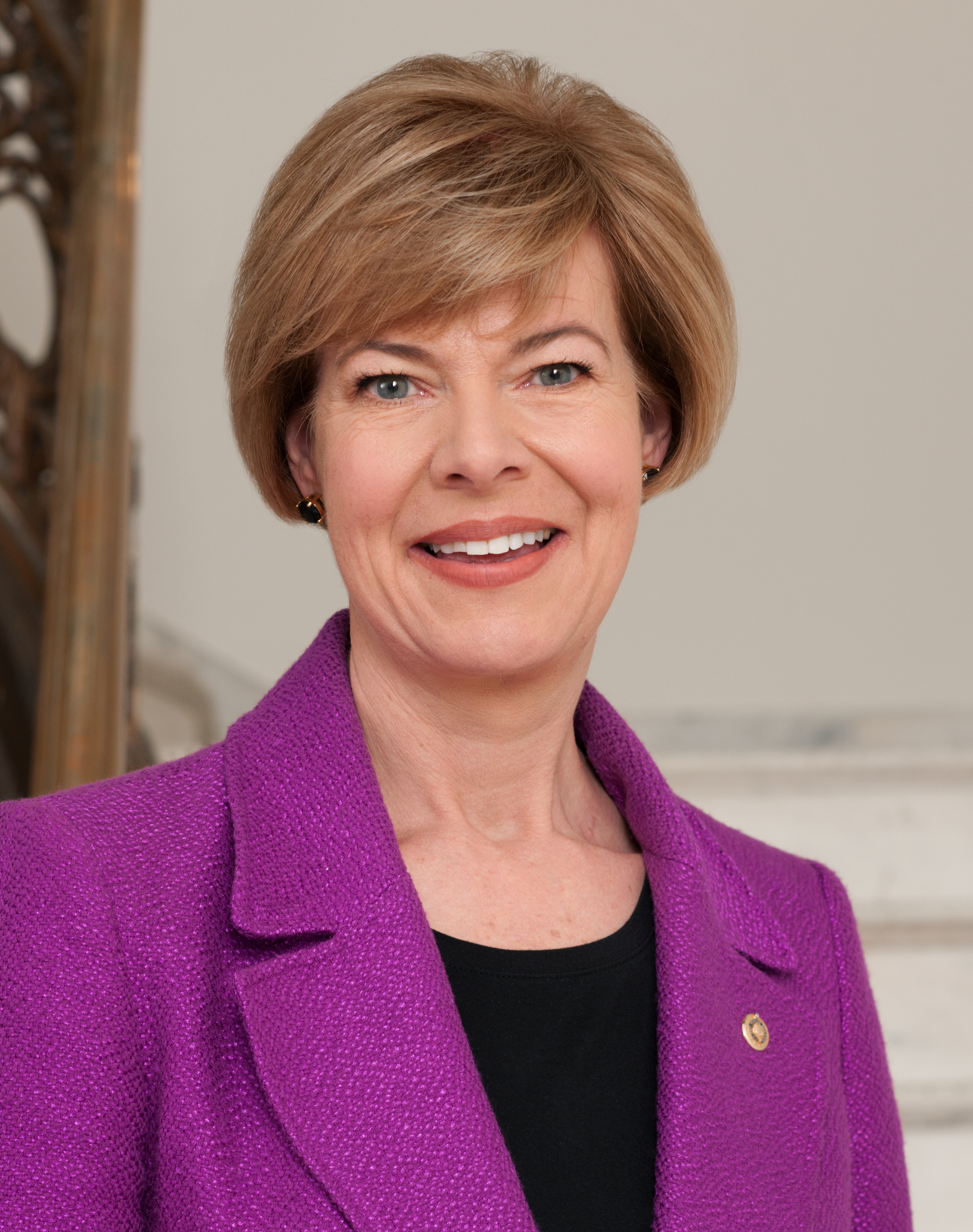

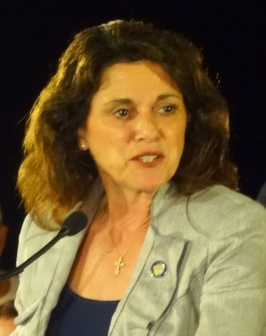
Nominee	Tammy Baldwin	Leah Vukmir
Party	Democratic	Republican
Popular vote	1,472,914	1,184,885
Percentage	55.36%	44.53%
- Baldwin: 50–60% 60–70% 70–80% 80–90% Vukmir: 50–60% 60–70%
U.S. senator before election
Tammy Baldwin
Democratic
Elected U.S. senator
Tammy Baldwin
Democratic

One-term Democrat Tammy Baldwin was elected with 51% of the vote in 2012. She ran.

State Senator Leah Vukmir and businessman and member of Wisconsin Board of Veterans Affairs Kevin Nicholson ran for the Republican nomination, with Vukmir proceeding to the general election.

Baldwin was re-elected with over 55% of the vote.

Wisconsin Democratic primary
Party	Candidate	Votes	%
Democratic	Tammy Baldwin (incumbent)	510,812	99.64
Write-in		1,848	0.36
Total votes		512,660	100.00

Wisconsin Republican primary
Party	Candidate	Votes	%
Republican	Leah Vukmir	217,230	48.90
Republican	Kevin Nicholson	191,276	43.06
Republican	George Lucia	18,786	4.23
Republican	Griffin Jones	8,699	1.96
Republican	Charles Barman	7,959	1.79
Write-in		303	0.07
Total votes		444,253	100.00

Wisconsin general election
Party	Candidate	Votes	%	±%
Democratic	Tammy Baldwin (incumbent)	1,472,914	55.36%	+3.95
Republican	Leah Vukmir	1,184,885	44.53%	–1.33
Write-in		2,964	0.11%	±0.00
Total votes		2,660,763	100.00%	
Democratic hold				

== Wyoming ==
Wyoming election
- Turnout: 77.43%
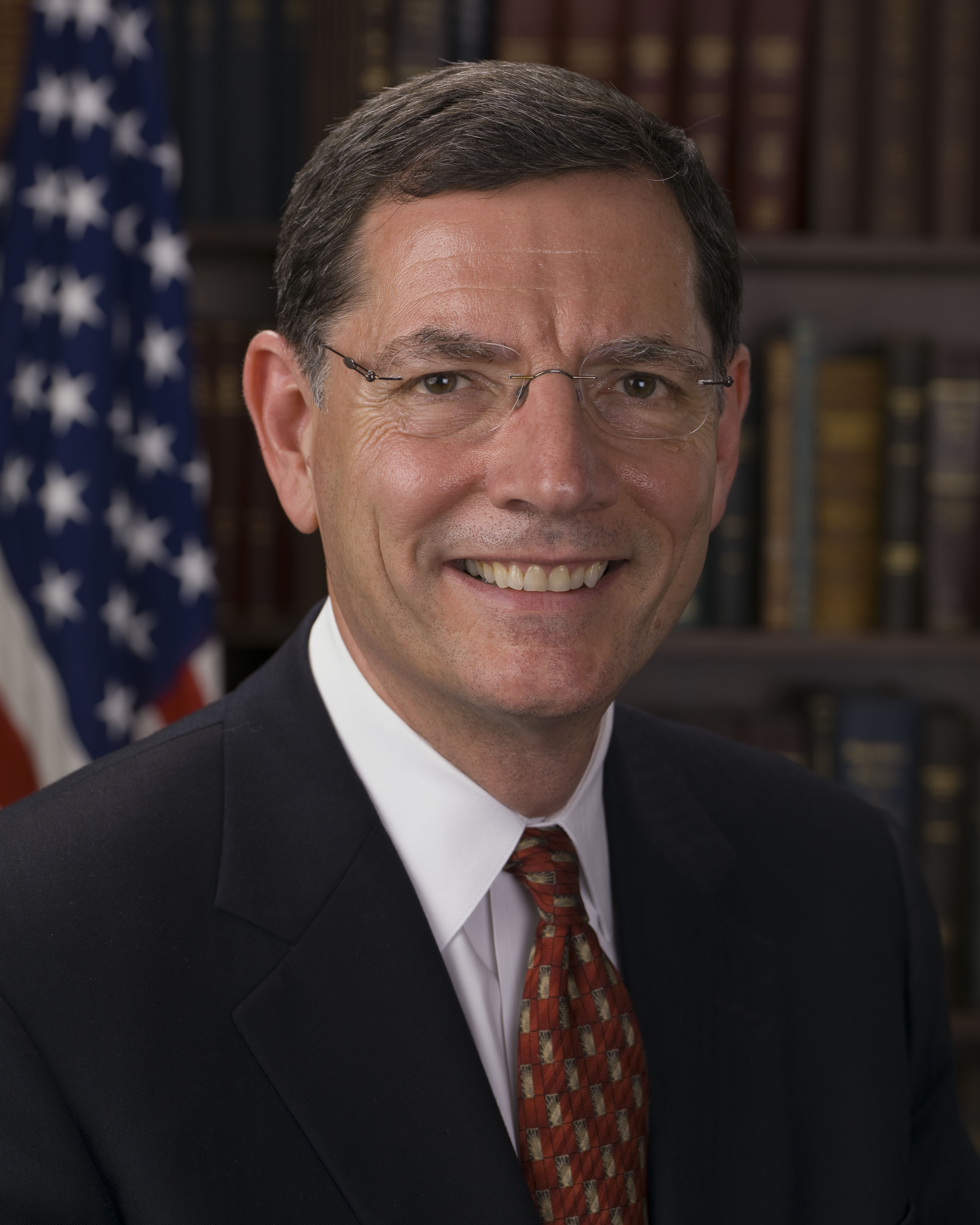

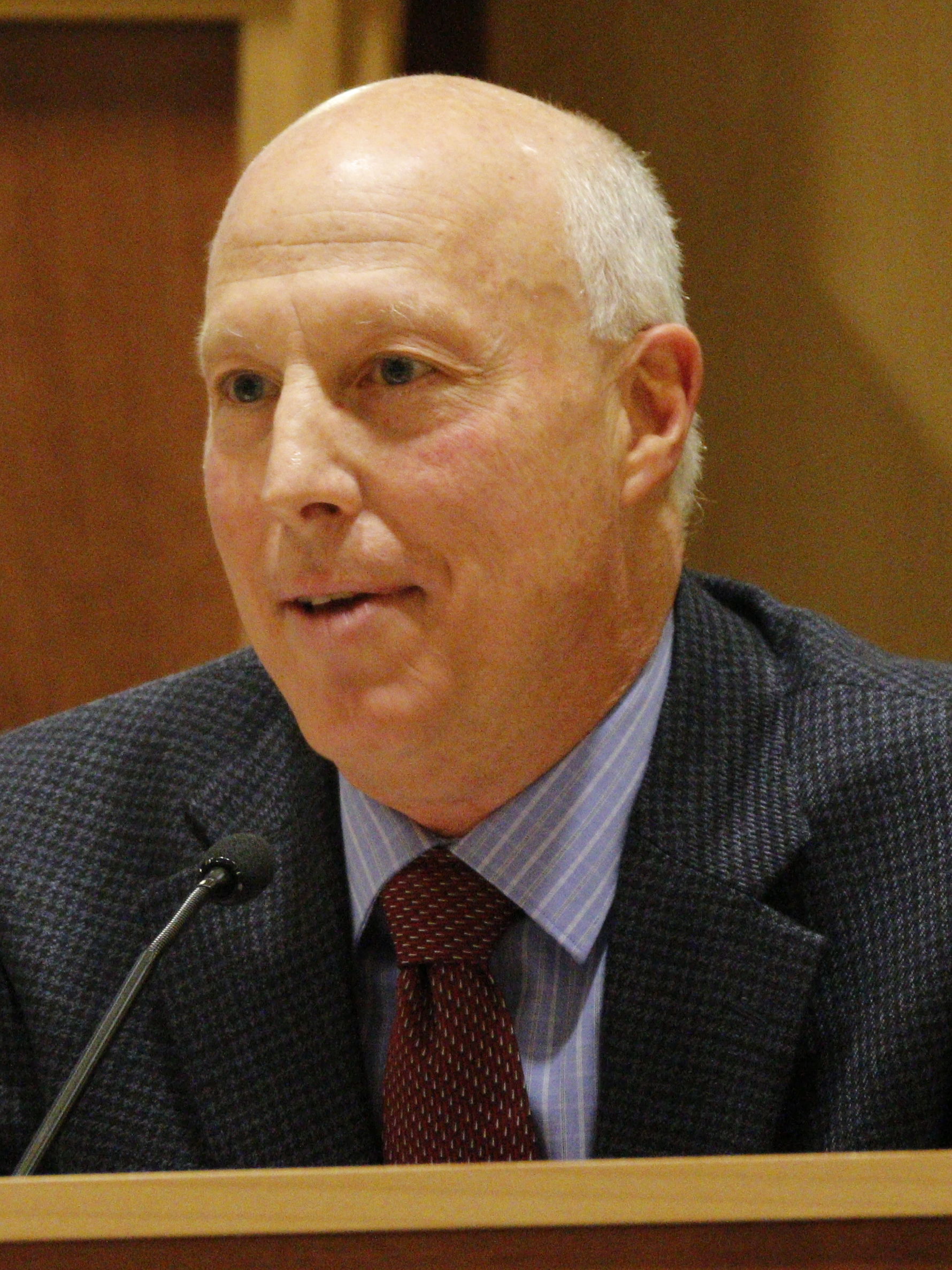
Nominee	John Barrasso	Gary Trauner
Party	Republican	Democratic
Popular vote	136,210	61,227
Percentage	66.96%	30.10%
- County results Barrasso: 50–60% 60–70% 70–80% 80–90% Trauner: 50–60% 60–70%
U.S. senator before election
John Barrasso
Republican
Elected U.S. senator
John Barrasso
Republican

One-term Republican John Barrasso was elected with 76% of the vote in 2012. Barrasso was appointed to the seat in 2007 and won a special election in 2008. He ran for reelection.

Gary Trauner, a Jackson Hole businessman and U.S. House candidate in 2006 and 2008, was the Democratic nominee.

Barrasso was easily elected to a second term, defeating Trauner.

Wyoming Republican primary
Party	Candidate	Votes	%
Republican	John Barrasso (incumbent)	74,292	64.76
Republican	Dave Dodson	32,647	28.46
Republican	John Holtz	2,981	2.60
Republican	Charlie Hardy	2,377	2.07
Republican	Rocky De La Fuente	1,280	1.12
Republican	Anthony Van Risseghem	870	0.76
Write-in		267	0.23
Total votes		114,714	100.00

Wyoming Democratic primary
Party	Candidate	Votes	%
Democratic	Gary Trauner	17,562	98.90
Write-in		195	1.10
Total votes		17,757	100.00

Wyoming general election
Party	Candidate	Votes	%	±%
Republican	John Barrasso (incumbent)	136,210	66.96%	–8.70
Democratic	Gary Trauner	61,227	30.10%	+8.45
Libertarian	Joseph Porambo	5,658	2.78%	N/A
Write-in		325	0.16%	–0.01
Total votes		203,420	100.00%	
Republican hold				

== See also ==
- 115th United States Congress
- 116th United States Congress
  - List of new members of the 116th United States Congress
- 2018 United States House of Representatives elections
- 2018 United States gubernatorial elections
