= I.E. America Radio Network =

American radio network

- Country: United States

Ownership
- Owner: United Auto Workers

History
- Launch date: 1996
- Closed: February 27, 2004
- Former names: United Broadcasting Network

Coverage
- Availability: North America

Links
- Website: ieamericaradio.com (archived)

i.e. America Radio Network was a Detroit-based radio network consisting primarily of liberal talk and lifestyle shows. They were owned by the United Auto Workers (UAW) and broadcast nationally from 1996 to 2004, via radio stations and a webcast.

The network was an outgrowth of networks established by populist talk radio host Charles "Chuck" Harder (c.1943-2018) beginning in 1987. Harder was an early investor in the network in its final form but pulled out of the venture amid disputes with the UAW.

== History ==
The origin of what became the i.e. America Radio Network began in Tampa, Florida in 1987. To more freely discuss controversial topics on the radio and take advantage of the recent repeal of the Fairness Doctrine, disc jockey-turned talk show host Charles "Chuck" Harder decided to start his own radio network in 1987. The new venture was christened The Sun Radio Network, and its purpose was to syndicate his populist-themed show, "For The People", which was carried primarily by commercial rural AM radio stations and shortwave radio. Originally broadcasting from the garage of his Tampa home, Harder and his wife Dianne later purchased the historic Telford Hotel in the town of White Springs to serve as studios.

Programming for SRN was also delivered from its flagship Tampa Bay affiliate, WEND 760, owned and operated by Harder's colleague, Bruce Micek. Direct competition with other stations, WFLA in particular, led to some on-air and off-air disputes.

Kayla Satellite Network, which was approximately half owned by Liberty Lobby, purchased the Sun Radio Network in December 1989. In 1991, Harder's show was dropped from the network and he proceeded to start a new radio network, the Peoples Radio Network.

=== Peoples Radio Network ===
The Peoples Radio Network was founded as a nonprofit organization, and Harder broadcast his show from the same studios in the Telford Hotel. The Peoples Radio Network also published a newspaper, the National News Reporter, sold memberships, books and other merchandise through a mail-order catalog. PRN members were sent a booklet of consumer advice by Harder, How to Squeeze Lemons and Make Lemonade, and a subscription to the Peoples Radio Network magazine.

At its peak in the early to mid-1990s, For The People was carried on over 300 radio stations, second only to Rush Limbaugh. The People's Radio Network later expanded to include hosts Jack Ellery, Joel Vincent (Howard Hewes), Paul Gonzalez and Jerry Hughes.

While still popular, the Peoples Radio Network declined during the mid-to-late 1990s with the advent of radio consolidation. Large radio chains began buying groups of radio stations and replacing current programming on their talk radio stations with more popular conservative-type shows.

The Peoples Radio Network's nonprofit status became the subject of an IRS audit following the 1992 presidential elections, alleging that PRN had attempted to influence the election against then-president George H. W. Bush. With the IRS audit continuing several years, Harder and his co-host Pat Choate searched for a funder for a new for-profit network which would not be subject to the restrictions on political advocacy of a nonprofit.

=== United Broadcasting Network ===
In 1996, Harder and his co-host Pat Choate were able to convince investors, particularly the United Auto Workers to provide funding for a new for-profit radio syndication service, the United Broadcasting Network. Harder's Peoples Radio Network was absorbed into the new venture. UAW's president at the time, Stephen Yokich, saw the UBN as a way to promote the union's ideals and counter conservative talk show hosts such as Rush Limbaugh. The union initially provided $5 million to help fund the venture.

Within three months the deal turned sour, and Harder was forced off the air, with the UAW assuming control over the new network's content. Pat Choate would become H. Ross Perot's vice presidential nominee in his election campaign. Without its only well-known talk show host, the United Broadcasting Network soon declared bankruptcy. Harder and Choate would both become embroiled in lawsuits against the UAW over the debacle, the eventual outcome of which gave sole ownership of the network to the UAW, which later renamed it i.e. America Radio Network (information, entertainment).

Radio hosts syndicated by UBN at the time included Jim Hightower, Marcy Kaptur and conservative populists Bay Buchanan and Duncan L. Hunter.

=== i.e. America Radio Network ===
With the UAW as sole owners, i.e. America Radio Network had evolved into its own entity by 2000. The network's talk show hosts included Doug Stephan, Peter Werbe, and Mike Malloy (the latter two joined the network in October 2000). The network's most widely syndicated shows were niche-based lifestyle-oriented programming covering topics such as car care, pets, legal advice and home improvement. They regularly featured programming from the Workers Independent News Service.

By 2002, i.e. America moved its entire operation into a new, state-of-the-art $2 million broadcast facility near the Michigan State Fairgrounds in Detroit and restructured its lineup, adding more liberal talk shows. Sirius Satellite Radio picked up quite a bit of the network's programming to form the basis of a liberal talk-oriented channel, Sirius Left. Nancy Skinner joined the network, initially as part of Stephan's daily morning show.

The network spent 2003 shaking up its on-air lineup. Werbe, who was the only union member on the airstaff (as a member of AFTRA), was dismissed on June 20, 2003, due to what the network called budgetary reasons. The same year, Skinner, Thom Hartmann and Peter B. Collins began hosting their own shows on the network. Malloy's show was moved from afternoons to late evenings. Later that year, author Marianne Williamson was added for afternoons.

After years of suffering losses on the radio network, rumored to be around $75,000 per month., the UAW announced on December 11, 2003 that they would fold the network. i.e. America aired its final day of broadcasts on February 27, 2004. There was much speculation as to why the network shut down. Chief among them was that the UAW, under president Ron Gettelfinger, wanted to shut down the money-losing venture. In addition, a higher profile liberal talk network startup, Air America Radio, was scheduled to debut in March 2004.

As a result of the end of i.e. America, Sirius Left, which had relied on the network for the bulk of their own programming, was forced to drastically overhaul the channel, by adding newly syndicated Ed Schultz and hiring San Francisco radio personality Alex Bennett. The Young Turks, Doug Stephan, Thom Hartmann and Peter B. Collins opted to self-syndicate their shows, which remained on the channel. Mike Malloy was unable to do this at the time, and in August 2004 joined Air America Radio.

== Fate of on-air personalities ==
- Chuck Harder – Continuing his radio show on a continuously declining number of stations and increasingly obscure networks, Harder's broadcast career became more intermittent by the late 2000s as a result of worsening health problems. Harder died April 10, 2018.
- Peter B. Collins – Hosted a weekday nationally syndicated progressive talk radio program from 2005 to 2009; currently a talk radio consultant and producer.
- Jack Ellery – last at WCTC
- Thom Hartmann – hosts a national progressive talk show syndicated by Dial Global.
- Jim Hightower – continues to syndicate daily radio commentary segment.
- Juline Jordan – last at WRIF – 101.1 FM in Detroit.
- Bobby Likis – continued to host his syndicated Car Clinic until his retirement in 2020.
- Mike Malloy – hosts and self-syndicates a late-night progressive talk radio program, The Mike Malloy Show.
- Jann Scott – hosted Addiction Free Radio weekends . offering recovery. Today he talks on Social Media
- Nancy Skinner – lost race as US Democratic Party candidate for the United States House of Representatives from Michigan's 9th congressional district in suburban Detroit in November 2006. Previously hosted a local progressive talk show on WDTW radio in Dearborn, MI. In 2009 hosted The Nancy Skinner Show, a nationally syndicated progressive talk radio program.
- Doug Stephan – continued to host his daily Good Day morning program until retiring from daily radio in 2024 and moving his continuing weekly programs to Talk Media Network.
- Tony Trupiano – Lost race as US Democratic Party candidate for the U.S. House of Representatives from Michigan's 11th congressional district in suburban Detroit in November 2006.
- Don Waller – former news personality. Founded Take Back The Media and Blah3
- Peter Werbe – last at WRIF in Detroit. He continues to write for the Fifth Estate magazine www.fifthestate.org.
- Marianne Williamson – lectures and offers courses on spiritual topics.
