= 2004 in radio =

The year 2004 saw a number of significant events in radio broadcasting history.

== Events ==
- 1 January – Mitteldeutscher Rundfunk's cultural channel MDR Kultur is relaunched as MDR Figaro.
- 10 and 11 January – Ryan Seacrest succeeds Casey Kasem as host of American Top 40
- 5 January – The Ed Schultz Show is launched.
- 31 March – Launch of Air America Radio, with affiliates in New York City (WLIB), Chicago (WNTD), Los Angeles (KBLA), San Bernardino (KCAA), Portland (KPOJ), West Palm Beach, Florida (WJNO), and Minneapolis (WMNN).
- 8 April – As part of a series of format changes at Cumulus Media-owned stations in the Quad Cities, KORB (93.5 FM) switches from active rock to hot adult contemporary, adopts the former call sign KQCS (which had been used at frequency from 1989 to 1995) and adopts the slogan "Star 93.5." The active rock format is moved to WXLP (96.9 FM), which dumps its longtime classic rock format as a result, and adopts the slogan "97 Rock."
- 19 April – Alex Bennett launches his new show on Sirius Left.
- 30 June – Pittsburgh radio station WBZZ, "B94", drops its 23-year-old Top 40/CHR format for active rock as "93-7 K-Rock" WRKZ.
- 1 July – KRBV in Dallas, TX drops its Top 40 format as "Wild 100.3" and change to Jack FM with KJKK as the station's new callsign.
- 7 September – The Stephanie Miller Show debuts.
- 28 September – KABL goes through a format change and callsign change, after forty-five years on 960 AM in the San Francisco Bay Area.
- 4 October – The Opie & Anthony Show returns to XM Satellite Radio after a 2-year hiatus from being cancelled on terrestrial radio.
- 6 October – Howard Stern announces on his radio show that he will be leaving terrestrial radio in 2006 and moving his show to Sirius Satellite Radio.
- 28 October-Shade 45 debuts on Sirius Satellite Radio.
- 30 October – In the UK a 163-metre-high radio mast at Peterborough collapses in a fire.
- 18 November – WCKW/New Orleans, Louisiana drops Adult Contemporary for Rhythmic Adult Contemporary as WDVW ("Diva 92.3").

== Closings ==
- May – Westwood One ends production of "NBC Radio News"-branded morning-drive newscasts, produced by CBS Radio personnel, one of the few remaining links to the original NBC Radio Network. The move came a year after the launch of the non-related "NBC News Radio" in an arrangement with NBC and Westwood One (that service would be expanded to a round-the-clock basis on 1 April 2012). Usage of the NBC Radio "Hotline" satellite chirp was also retired.
- 27 February – I.E. America Radio Network ends operations,
- 15 December – Brian Beirne retires from KRTH.

== Deaths ==
- 8 January – John A. Gambling, 73, American radio host, "Rambling with Gambling"
- 22 January – Billy May, 87, American composer, arranger and trumpeter
- 28 January – José Miguel Agrelot, 76, Puerto Rican radio host
- 15 March – Chuck Niles, 76, first jazz disc jockey to be on the Hollywood Walk of Fame
- 3 July – Jimmy Mack, 70, Scots radio personality
- 9 July – Bill Randle, 81, Cleveland and New York disc jockey; presenter of the first Elvis Presley concert north of the Mason–Dixon line (in Brooklyn, Ohio).
- 23 September – Bill Ballance, 85, American radio personality
- 28 September – Scott Muni, 74, longtime New York City radio disc jockey
- 2 October – Fialho Gouveia, 69, Portuguese radio and TV presenter (cardiac arrest)
- 13 October – Erik Bye, 78, Norwegian journalist (AP, BBC, NRK), radio/TV host, actor, singer/songwriter (cancer)
- 25 October – John Peel, 65, British radio disc jockey (heart attack)
- 12 November – Norman Rose, 87, radio and TV actor, All My Children voice of Juan Valdez
- 20 November – David Grierson, 49, Canadian Broadcasting Corporation radio and television host
- 23 November – Frances Chaney, 89, American actress in old-time radio
- 27 November – John Dunn, 70, British BBC Radio 2 disc jockey (cancer)
- 28 November – Molly Weir, 94, Scottish TV and radio actress
- 9 December – David Brudnoy, 64, Boston radio talk show host, cancer
- date unknown – Dennis R. ("Dick") Covington, 77, American radio broadcaster, KYW, Philadelphia, Pennsylvania

== See also ==
- Radio broadcasting
