= Brian O'Byrne =

Brian O'Byrne may refer to:

- Bryan O'Byrne (1931–2009), American character actor
- Brían F. O'Byrne (born 1967), Irish-born actor based in the United States

== See also ==
- Brian Beirne (born 1946), American radio DJ
- Brian Byrne (disambiguation)
- Brian Burns (disambiguation)
