= Brian Byrne (disambiguation) =

Brian Byrne (born 1975) is a Canadian singer-songwriter.

Brian or Bryan Byrne may also refer to:

- Brian Byrne (boxer) (born 1956), Irish Olympic boxer
- Brian Byrne (squash player) (born 1984), Irish squash player
- Brian Byrne (dual player) (born 1995), Irish Gaelic footballer and hurler
- Brian L. Byrne (born 1942), Australian social scientist
- Bryan Byrne (footballer) (born 1983), Irish soccer player
- Bryan Byrne (rugby union) (born 1993), Irish rugby union player

== See also ==
- Brian Oswald Donn-Byrne (1889–1928), Irish novelist
- Brian Beirne (born 1946), American radio DJ
- Brian O'Byrne (disambiguation)
- Brian Burns (disambiguation)
