= List of Jill Stein 2016 presidential campaign endorsements =

Jill Stein for President
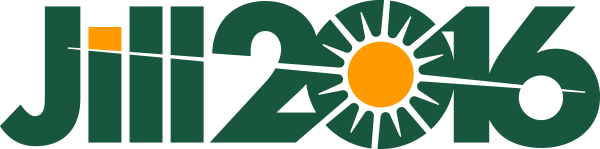
- Campaign: U.S. presidential election, 2016
- Candidate: Jill Stein; Former member of the Lexington; Town Meeting from the 2nd district (2005-2011); Ajamu Baraka; Human rights activist
- Affiliation: Green Party
- Status: Announced: June 22, 2015; Presumptive nominee: June 15, 2016; Official nominee: August 6, 2016
- Headquarters: Brooklyn, New York
- Key people: Ajamu Baraka (running mate); Gloria Mattera (campaign manager); Adrian Boutureira (field director); David Schwab (communications director)
- Receipts: US$3,218,525 (2016-08-31)
- Slogan: 1. ItsInOurHands.

Website
- www.Jill2016.com

This is a list of notable individuals and organizations who voiced their endorsement of the Green Party's presidential nominee Jill Stein for the 2016 presidential election.

== Elected officials and public officeholders ==
=== Current ===
- Jovanka Beckles, member of the Richmond, California City Council and former vice mayor of Richmond
- Cecil Bothwell, member of the Asheville, North Carolina City Council
- Cam Gordon, member of the Minneapolis City Council
- Gayle McLaughlin, member of the Richmond, California City Council and former mayor of Richmond
- Kshama Sawant, member of the Seattle City Council

=== Former ===
- Robert Caldwell, former councilman for Choctaw-Apache Community of Ebarb, LA
- Marsha Coleman-Adebayo, former senior policy analyst for the United States Environmental Protection Agency and racial justice advocate
- Ron Paul, former U.S. representative from Texas (1976–1977, 1979–1985, 1997–2013) (switched endorsement from Rand Paul after he withdrew) (Libertarian) (Note: Ron Paul claimed that people should vote for Jill Stein during the 2016 United States presidential election, citing her support for civil liberties and her non-interventionist foreign policy. However, he claimed he was not making a formal endorsement.)
- Charlotte Pritt, former member of the West Virginia House of Delegates and West Virginia State Senate and candidate for governor of West Virginia, 2016

== International political figures ==
- Alessandro Di Battista, Italian politician, member of the Chamber of Deputies (2013–2018) (Five Star Movement)
- George Galloway, British politician, former MP (1987–2010, 2012–2015) (Respect)
- Joe Higgins, Irish politician, former TD (1997–2007, 2011–2016), former MEP (2009–2011) (Socialist)

== Activists, humanitarians, and labor leaders ==
- Patch Adams, activist and physician
- Medea Benjamin, co-founder of Code Pink and Global Exchange
- Ellen Brown, author and founder of the Public Banking Institute
- Rosa Clemente, journalist, activist, and Green Party vice presidential candidate in 2008
- Bob Fitrakis, Ohio Green Party Co-Chair
- Howie Hawkins, activist and former Green Party candidate for governor of New York
- Cheri Honkala, co-founder/national coordinator of Poor People's Economic Human Rights Campaign and Green Party vice presidential candidate in 2012
- Dan La Botz, author, educator, and co-founder of Teamsters for a Democratic Union
- Ray McGovern, former Army officer and CIA analyst
- Camille Paglia, academic and social critic
- Dr. Jack Rasmus, Economics Dept, St. Mary's College
- Coleen Rowley, former FBI agent and whistleblower
- Richard Stallman, programmer, software freedom activist, founder of FSF and GNU Project
- Harvey Wasserman, senior advisor to Greenpeace USA and the Nuclear Information and Resource Service
- Cornel West, philosopher, academic, social activist, author, member of Democratic Socialists of America, and member of the DNC platform committee
- Richard D. Wolff, Marxian economist
- L. Randall Wray, senior scholar, Levy Economics Institute
- Kevin Zeese, former executive director of National Organization for the Reform of Marijuana Laws (NORML)

== Journalists and media personalities ==
- Jimmy Dore, host of online talk show The Jimmy Dore Show
- Chris Hedges, author and former New York Times Middle East bureau chief
- Marc Lamont Hill, BET News correspondent, CNN political commentator, and Distinguished Professor of African American Studies at Morehouse College
- Bill Kauffman
- Kyle Kulinski, co-founder of Justice Democrats and host of online radio show Secular Talk
- Mike Malloy, host of the online talk show The Mike Malloy Show
- Abby Martin, former journalist at RT America and teleSUR English
- Bhaskar Sunkara, political writer; founding editor and publisher of Jacobin
- David Swanson, journalist and author
- Boyce Watkins, author, economist, political analyst, and social commentator

== Arts and entertainment ==
=== Actors, entertainers and filmmakers ===
- Seb Castro
- Rosario Dawson
- Vivian Kubrick
- Craig McCracken
- Viggo Mortensen
- Susan Sarandon
- Oliver Stone
- Isaiah Washington

=== Musicians ===
- Cristian Castro
- Immortal Technique
- Lady Miss Kier
- R.A. the Rugged Man
- David Rovics
- Slug

== Athletes ==
- Daniel Bryan
- Kelly Slater

== Organizations ==
- Campaign for Peace and Democracy, anti-war political advocacy group
- International Socialist Organization, revolutionary socialist organization in the United States
- Oregon Progressive Party, minor political party in Oregon
- Socialist Alternative, socialist political party in the United States
- Solidarity, revolutionary socialist organization in the United States
