= KPHX =

Radio station in Arizona, United States

Coordinates: 33°23′21″N 111°59′53″W

- Phoenix, Arizona; United States
- Broadcast area: Phoenix metropolitan area
- Frequency: 1480 kHz
- Branding: La Hermosa 1480 AM/92.9 FM

Programming
- Language: Spanish
- Format: Christian radio

Ownership
- Owner: Jacob Garcia; (La Hermosa Radio LLC)

History
- First air date: June 10, 1958
- Former call signs: KHAT (1958–1972)
- Call sign meaning: Phoenix

Technical information
- Licensing authority: FCC
- Facility ID: 13790
- Class: D
- Power: 1,000 watts (day); 33 watts (night)
- Translator: 92.9 K225CT (Paradise Valley)

Links
- Public license information: Public file; LMS
- Website: lahermosa1480.com

KPHX (1480 AM) is a commercial radio station in Phoenix, Arizona. It is owned by Jacob Garcia, through licensee La Hermosa Radio LLC. KPHX carries a Spanish language Christian talk and teaching radio format. It is also heard on FM translator 92.9 K225CT in Paradise Valley, Arizona.

Using a directional antenna, KPHX broadcasts with 1,000 watts by day and 33 watts at night.

== History ==
=== KHAT ===
The station at 1480 AM signed on the air on June 10, 1958, as a daytime-only country music station called KHAT. This format stayed in place until 1972, when it switched to an all-news radio format as KPHX, which only lasted about a year. The format and call sign changes accompanied a 1972 sale to Phoenix Broadcasting Co. This period saw additional changes, including a power increase from 500 to 1,000 watts.

Around 1974, with its sale to the Riverside Amusement Park Company, KPHX became a Spanish language station playing Regional Mexican music. By 1982, KPHX had started operating at night, using two transmitter sites to provide the daytime and nighttime service.

=== Comedy and adult standards ===
Starting in 2004, KPHX aired a syndicated all-comedy format, which remained for nearly two years. KPHX flipped to an adult standards format in 2006, featuring the "Music of Your Life" radio network.

=== Progressive talk format ===
After KXXT (1010 AM), the Phoenix affiliate of Air America Radio since the fall of 2004, was sold to a station group known as Communicom in January 2006, and as a result changed to a Christian radio format by March 2006, the progressive talk format disappeared from the Phoenix radio airwaves. In late March 2006, the owners of KPHX entered into a local marketing agreement (LMA) with Sheldon Drobny's Nova M Radio, bringing the Air America progressive/liberal talk format to KPHX.

1480 KPHX Nova M logo used from 2007 - January 1, 2009

=== The Lounge Sound ===
1480 KPHX The Lounge Sound logo used from January 1, 2009 - July 6, 2009

On January 1, 2009, KPHX switched to an adult standards format as "The Lounge Sound". Brad "Martini" Chambers, the man behind KPHX's new format, succeeded in getting the format back on the air after running a similar format on AM 690 XETRA in Tijuana, also serving San Diego and Los Angeles. Chambers, who had the morning show, "Martini In The Morning", continued The Lounge Sound format on the internet from his studios in Studio City, California.

=== Return to progressive talk ===
Former logo

On July 6, 2009, KPHX discontinued the Lounge Sound and switched back to the progressive talk format. Mike Newcomb hosted an afternoon drive program; the nationally broadcast programs of Randi Rhodes, Thom Hartmann, Bill Press, Stephanie Miller, Mike Malloy and Ed Schultz also returned to the KPHX lineup.

KPHX also began carrying the Alan Colmes show, and also the independently syndicated news program Democracy Now! (heard mainly on Pacifica Radio stations among others) on a tape delay basis. Several times per day, national news updates from Westwood One were heard at the top of the hour.

Rhodes' and Schultz's radio shows both ceased in the spring of 2014. As of fall 2015, Bill Press, Thom Hartmann, Stephanie Miller and Alan Colmes remain on the schedule from this group of hosts.

In January 2016, a locally produced progressive call-in talk show made its debut, hosted by progressive commentator Sam Kelley. Kelley's program aired weekday afternoons, replacing the Jim Rome sports talk show on the schedule. This was the first locally produced afternoon drive program on the station since Mike Newcomb's program ended in 2014.

On June 15, 2016, a new afternoon drive-time show debuted from 3:00 PM to 4:00 PM. "Daily Voice" with long time station personality and former producer for the Mike Newcomb show, Eric Reinert. Eric was also a co-host on "Team America" which also aired on KPHX briefly. Daily Voice is produced by Kathleen Osborn who is also on the show as Eric's cohost.

=== Addition of CBS Sports Radio ===
Some locally produced sports talk programming had been on the station on weekends since 2012. Then in the fall of 2014, KPHX added some programming from the recently established CBS Sports Radio network. The Jim Rome Show, The Doug Gottlieb Show and the Amy Lawrence overnight show were on the schedule.

KPHX dropped Rome's and Gottlieb's shows on December 11, 2015, in favor of political shows, while Lawrence's show remains on the schedule to fill overnight hours. All remaining CBS Sports Radio programs left KPHX when a new sports talk outlet, 1580 AM KQFN, began broadcasting in February 2017.

=== Spanish religion ===
On July 1, 2017, KPHX went dark. The station's website stated that "KPHX 1480 is no longer broadcasting progressive talk in Phoenix...Thank you for listening". The AMC-8 satellite that supplied its programming was taken out of service at midnight on June 30, 2017. AMC-8 has been replaced by AMC-18, which is at a different location in the sky, requiring repointing the station's dish.

Effective October 31, 2017, Continental Broadcasting Corp. of Arizona sold KPHX to Vic Michael's Cedar Cove Broadcasting, Inc., for $100,000. Cedar Cove put a Spanish language Christian talk and teaching format on the station.

Effective November 26, 2021, Cedar Cove Broadcasting sold KPHX and translator K225CT to Jacob Garcia's La Hermosa Radio LLC for $150,000.
