= Herbert "Sarge" Phelps =

American radio host

Herbert "Sarge" Phelps is a New-Orleans born pioneer of progressive talk radio in the southern United States. Phelps graduated from the University of Southern Mississippi with a B.S. in Sports Administration and Coaching in 1983. After Hurricane Katrina hit the Gulf Coast region, Phelps came out of retirement to become an activist for Katrina issues.

== Radio career ==
Phelps began giving reports on the Mike Malloy Show on Air America in 2005. A great deal of his reports covered the lack of governmental response to Hurricane Katrina and the hardships that the victims were suffering.

Phelps continued reporting on Air America until 2007 when moved to his own radio show, first known as the "Unreported News Radio Show". The show became the first progressive radio show to air regularly on a terrestrial station in Mississippi on WQRZ FM. The show, was the first and last liberal talk-radio show to air on a Mississippi radio station.

Phelps currently hosts a progressive talk-radio show called "Coffee With Sarge" that is now carried on 1480 KPHX-AM Phoenix, Az. and WXBH-FM in Louisville Ky, as well as the Roots Up Radio Network and is affiliated with the Jeff Farias Show.

== Controversy ==
As the first and only progressive\liberal talk-show host to ever air out of Mississippi, Phelps faced a great deal of opposition. In January 2007, Phelps reported that approximately 300 section 8 housing residents and Katrina Victims were being evicted for commercial development. Phelps was able to legally have the eviction stopped^{1}.

After receiving numerous death threats in Mississippi, Phelps moved to Arizona. Phelps show continues to highlight Katrina issues^{2}.
