= Nova M Radio =

Defunct radio syndication service

- Company type: Privately owned limited liability company
- Industry: Radio broadcasting, advertising
- Genre: National radio network
- Founded: 2006
- Defunct: 2009
- Headquarters: Phoenix, Arizona
- Area served: United States, Canada (XM Canada, Sirius Canada)
- Key people: Sheldon Drobny, Anita Drobny, Mike Newcomb
- Products: Nancy Skinner radio program The Mike Malloy Show; The Mike Newcomb Show

Nova M Radio, later known as On Second Thought, was a radio syndication service providing progressive talk programming. Founded as Nova M Radio by Sheldon and Anita Drobny in 2006, its stated purpose was to purchase, own, and operate underperforming radio stations in small and medium-sized markets. These stations would then broadcast progressive talk radio content, particularly programming from their own network, as well as from Air America Radio and other organizations. On February 18, 2009, the network was bought out by Mike Newcomb, a former on-air personality and business partner with the Drobnys; it was Newcomb who gave the company its final name.

On Second Thought had planned on using 1190 Nova M KNUV Phoenix as its flagship station, however on March 2, 2009, KNUV's doors were reported padlocked closed, and on March 5, 2009, KNUV returned to a Spanish-language news/talk/music format. Since the network's operations were based at the studios, the network was shut down.

== History ==
In late March 2006, Nova M entered into a local marketing agreement (LMA) with Continental Broadcasting, owner of KPHX in Phoenix, Arizona, bringing the progressive talk programming formerly carried (since the fall of 2004) by KXXT (1010 kHz AM) with them.

On October 18 of the same year, following the Chapter 11 filing by Air America, Nova M announced that it would form its own radio network featuring personalities including Newcomb, Mike Malloy, and John Zogby. The eventual Nova M lineup had only two weekday hosts on the full network, Malloy and Randi Rhodes, and one Sunday program featuring Herb "Sarge" Phelps and King Daevid MacKenzie that aired on the Phoenix station and WQRZ-LP in Bay St. Louis, Mississippi. KPHX served as the flagship of Nova M's new network until the end of 2008. Network General Manager, Arthur Mobley, facilitated the purchase of KNUV in order to save the network before the LMA with KPHX was due to terminate. Mobley coordinated the move to KNUV 1190 AM and the network was briefly simulcast on KNUV. When the LMA ended with KPHX, the station switched to an Adult standards music format and KNUV became the new Nova M flagship station on January 1, 2009.

The company operated KDXE in Little Rock, Arkansas, under a similar agreement until early 2007. Nova M originally planned to lease stations in other cities, but later, the Drobnys urged local groups to organize to purchase or lease stations for progressive talk radio.

Rhodes' last show on Nova M before an abrupt break was February 3, 2009. Political commentator and one-time Congressional candidate Nancy Skinner hosted the show in Rhodes' absence beginning February 5. Following this, Anita Drobny of Nova M Radio posted a message on the Nova M site saying that they were unable to disclose details of what is going on due to Rhodes' having complete control of the show, and that Rhodes "now has to make her decisions as to what she must do with her career". Mrs. Drobny has also said, "People are saying it's about money. It's not about money at all. I just could not fulfill one of her requirements." She did, however, note the financial impact of Rhodes' departure: "I looked at [our] site, and I see that because Randi Rhodes isn't on, there are so many people leaving the Founders Club [which involves a fee paid to Nova M]. And you can't operate without people's participation." Rhodes' own Web site was also taken down, and replaced with a letter from Rhodes to supporters stating that the entire situation was within Nova M's control, that any implication that Rhodes is responsible for the disruption is false, and that Rhodes' show will be "seeking a new home" in light of the recent developments. According to an individual familiar with the issue, Nova M agreed to provide certain standard legal protection for the popular radio host, but Rhodes had to leave the air and Nova M following a discovery that Nova had not lived up to its contractual promise. Subsequently, on February 19, 2009, Nova M Radio announced that they would be filing for bankruptcy liquidation, but no such filing occurred.

Stephen Lemons, a blogger for the Phoenix New Times, suggested that On Second Thought has also ceased to exist, and radio station KKGN, which airs Mike Malloy's show, reported on its blog that Malloy had become self-syndicated. Records available from the Arizona Corporation Commission as of 11 March 2009, however, indicate that the LLC, which was originally formed in 2003, remained a going concern.

XM Satellite Radio aired content syndicated by Nova M and On Second Thought on the America Left channel. Randi Rhodes was broadcast live until Nova M collapsed. She was replaced by Nancy Skinner, who was broadcast live until the closure of On Second Thought. Mike Malloy was broadcast on a one-hour delay until February 2009.

On Second Thought's final syndicated offerings consisted of three weekday shows, hosted by Skinner (weekday afternoons), Newcomb (weekday evenings), and Malloy (weekday late nights).

== Aftermath ==
Newcomb eventually regained an outlet for his show in the Phoenix market; KPHX would air Newcomb's show in drive-time. The Mike Newcomb Show was then offered nationally. Randi Rhodes formerly hosted her radio program "The Randi Rhodes Show" on Premiere Radio Networks, the distribution subsidiary of Clear Channel Communications. (Randi Rhodes ended her show May 16, 2014.) Malloy began self-syndication of his program; this continues to the present.
