= Peter B. Collins =

American talk radio host (born 1953)

Peter B. Collins (born 1953) is an American talk radio host and media consultant based near San Francisco, California.

Collins was a talk show host for several radio stations, known for his liberal perspectives. From 2005 to 2009, he hosted The Peter B. Collins Show, a syndicated radio talk show based at KRXA in Monterey, California. Collins retired at the end of 2020.

== Early life and education ==
Collins grew up in Cincinnati, Ohio, where he attended St. Xavier High School. He attended Northwestern University in Chicago, where he began his career in radio broadcasting. He moved to the San Francisco Bay Area in 1976.

== Career ==
Collins' first radio broadcasting job was on a nightly talk show at ABC-owned WLS-FM in Chicago. This was during the era of the Watergate scandal.

In 1979, he moved to co-owned KGO in San Francisco, California. KCBS-FM hired him in 1980, and he worked part-time for both stations for a while. When KCBS-FM switched its call letters to KRQR and began playing album-oriented rock instead of classic hits, he was promoted to morning host. He gave fellow host Steven Seaweed the nickname "The Weed Man," which became Seaweed's best-known moniker for more than 30 years.

In 1989, Collins returned to talk radio with an afternoon program on KNBR. He also co-hosted a daily one-hour food and wine show on KNBR, featuring many acclaimed winemakers and chefs. When rival station KSFO adopted a talk format in 1993, it hired Collins for the "afternoon drive" time slot. Their billboard campaign endorsed his show as "a little to the left," playing on his politics and the station's dial position (560 AM). When ABC Radio, Disney, purchased KSFO in 1994, it converted the station to the first all-conservative talk format and dropped Collins' show.

Since leaving KSFO, Collins has produced other radio shows, such as Childhood Matters on KISQ, Street Soldiers on KMEL, Conversations on the Coast with Jim Foster on KFRC, and Nurse Talk on AM 960. He also began working as a political media consultant, working on political campaigns for clients including Nancy Pelosi, Tom Campbell and Pete McCloskey. Collins has performed as a voice-over artist for radio and TV commercials, as well as station promos for television and radio, non-broadcast sales and training programs. He hosted Behind the Wheel, a car review show that aired from 1998 to 2008.

In May 2003, Collins returned to talk radio as host of All-American Talk Radio on I.E. America Radio Network, SIRIUS Left and via webcast. In 2005, Collins and other investors purchased KRXA, based in Monterey, California. He started to broadcast the nationally syndicated Peter B. Collins Show that year, which also focused on politically progressive content.

=== Other activities ===
Since 1986, Collins has served as board president of the Freedom Foundation, a nonprofit based at San Quentin Prison. The foundation provides legal and investigative assistance to inmates in California who claim to have been wrongfully convicted and seek reviews of their cases.

Collins was officer of the San Francisco Local of the American Federation of TV and Radio Artists (SAG-AFTRA), from 1983 to 2005. He served on AFTRA's national board from 1993 to 2005. Collins is also a member of Sacramento Seminar, a group of Bay Area political veterans—former officeholders, candidates, staffers and campaign operatives. Collins was named to the Bay Area Radio Hall of Fame in 2021.

== Personal life ==
He is an avid skier and sailor, and is a partner in a sailboat on San Francisco Bay.
