= The Mike Malloy Show =

- Genre: Progressive talk
- Running time: 1 hour (9 p.m.–10 p.m. ET)
- Country of origin: United States
- Language: English
- Syndicates: Malloy Broadcasting
- Hosted by: Mike Malloy
- Created by: Mike Malloy
- Executive producer: Mike Malloy
- Recording studio: Atlanta, Georgia
- Original release: 1987 – present
- Opening theme: "Run Like Hell" (Mondays-Thursdays) "Friday Is My Day" (Fridays)
- Other themes: "Talking Out of Turn" (closing to first hour) "Sitting at the Wheel" (opening to second hour) "With Or Without You" (closing to second hour) "The Story in Your Eyes" (opening to third hour)
- Ending theme: "Horéré Ukundé" (Mondays-Thursdays) "Straight to Hell" (Fridays)
- Website: MikeMalloy.com

The Mike Malloy Show is a syndicated progressive radio talk show hosted by long-time radio personality Mike Malloy. Malloy came to talk radio in 1987, moving from his position as a writer and producer at CNN. He was married to former producer Kathy Bay from 1997 to 2020, with whom he has a daughter born in July, 2004. He has an additional five children, all grown, and six grandchildren.

The show features Malloy's extended monologues on the day's news and the people and events behind it, listener calls, and occasional guest interviews. He advocates for the Democratic Party to move to the left and to take more liberal and progressive stands. Malloy's radio style is very confrontational and sometimes controversial: he is an advocate for the open discussion of 9/11 conspiracy theories, for the impeachment of George W. Bush and the ousting of what he calls "spineless democrats" from the U.S. Congress. Malloy refers to his audience as "Truthseekers". Malloy often collectively refers to George W. Bush, his father, and their associates as the "Bush Crime Family".

Malloy's show is currently self-syndicated. Until March 2009 it was syndicated by the Nova M Radio network. Previously, it was syndicated by Air America Radio, but Air America abruptly dropped the show on August 30, 2006. The Mike Malloy Show is currently carried by 13 broadcast stations as well as the Sirius XM Progress satellite radio channel nationwide. Its broadcast originates from Atlanta, Georgia. Malloy is the only radio talk show host in America to have received the A.I.R (Achievement in Radio) Award in both Chicago and New York City. Talkers Magazine included Malloy among their list of "the 250 Most Important Radio Talk Show Hosts in America" but did not name him as one of the Heavy Hundred."

== Broadcast history ==
After years on WSB in Atlanta and WLS in Chicago, the show launched into national syndication on Air America Radio August 2, 2004 and was broadcast live on weeknights from 10 p.m.-1 a.m. Eastern Time on some Air America affiliates.

In January 2006, Malloy's show was removed from WLIB, Air America's New York City affiliate. He was replaced by the apolitical Satellite Sisters' show. On August 11, 2006, he announced his pending return to WLIB on September 1, 2006, barring no unforeseen difficulties. However, unforeseen difficulties did indeed arise.

On August 30, 2006 the following notice appeared on his web site:

MIKE MALLOY FIRED BY AIR AMERICA RADIO: There will be no Mike Malloy program today – or any day – on Air America Radio as we have been terminated. We are as shocked as you are. We are told it's a financial decision. More details to follow as we hear them ourselves.

At the time, Malloy was not doing his show, but substituting for Randi Rhodes on her show. In an interview on The Majority Report that aired on September 8, 2006, Mike explained that he was fired for "financial reasons." He said he was looking for another place to do his show, and while he would like to come back to Air America, he would never do so while the current management was in place due to the unprofessional way he was fired.

Immediately after Malloy's firing from Air America, Head On Radio Network broadcast "best of" Malloy programs dating back to March 2003 at 10:00 p.m. EST

From October 2006 until March 2009, Malloy broadcast on the Nova M Radio network from 9:00 p.m. to midnight EST.

== Regular features ==
- 1984 - Malloy read excerpts from George Orwell's classic novel during one segment of the show (usually in the last half-hour); lasted from January 2006 through May 2006.
- Cinco de Moron – The annual show on Cinco de Mayo that makes fun of the manner in which George W. Bush speaks Spanish. The 2006 show focused on the controversy surrounding Bush's opinion of singing "The Star-Spangled Banner" in Spanish.
- Youth Night – The occasional show where Mike only takes phone calls from teenagers from 13 through 17 years of age.
- Uncle Mike's Story Corner – A depressing story, usually related to the war in Iraq, set to the theme song of Mister Rogers' Neighborhood
- Who Stole the Kishka? – Mike starts playing the mentioned polka song and begins dancing to the music in the studio.
- Church Night – Every Wednesday night, the program focuses chiefly on the latest happenings within the Christian right, starting in 2012–2013.

== Jargon ==
=== Catchphrases ===
Malloy is frequently heard employing a number of catch phrases that have become trademarks of his style, among them are:

- "Have I mentioned yet tonight how much I hate these people?" – In reference to right-wingers.
- "Maaaaaarge!" – Mike's excited introduction of Marge, a senior single mother from Merrillville, Indiana, who was a popular regular caller since Malloy's days at WLS. Marge died on June 23, 2010.
- "Batsqueeze","Batsnot" – euphemism for the word "bullshit"
- "Press the Meat" – Malloy's name for the NBC news show Meet the Press
- "Rat Bastards", "Pigs", – In reference to right-wingers.
- "Bush Crime Family", – In reference to the Bush family and their chief supporters and surrogates
- "No offense to sex workers."- After using the word "whore" or related words.
- "Right-wing vermin" or "right-wing cockroaches"
- "Have a great weekend, Kevn Kinney, wherever you are."- After concluding the show on Fridays.
- "Ammosexuals"- Referring to fervent supporters of gun rights, borrowed from Bill Maher.

Malloy, since moving his program to internet-only, has abandoned some above-mentioned minced oaths in favor of using explicit language.

== Notable episodes ==
On May 9, 2003, a weekly segment named Bush-Free Fridays was supposed to start on the show, where neither Malloy or any callers to the show would mention George W. Bush by name. The segment was not successful, as even Malloy himself at one point mentioned Bush by name and joked about leaving the studio during the show.

On November 9, 2007, Malloy played a segment from The O'Reilly Factor where host Bill O'Reilly did a segment on Malloy, about a comment he had made earlier on the show about having "violence fantasies" about Scott McClellan and Dana Perino. Malloy ridiculed O'Reilly on-air as the segment was playing, and later mentioned the case where a visitor on O'Reilly's blog said that "his guns were loaded" if Hillary Clinton should become president.

In June 2009 Interviewed by Brad Friedman, Former FBI translator and Whistleblower Sibel Edmonds has stated : "I have information about things that our government has lied to us about. I know. For example, to say that since the fall of the Soviet Union we ceased all of our intimate relationship with Bin Laden and the Taliban – those things can be proven as lies, very easily, based on the information they classified in my case, because we did carry very intimate relationship with these people, and it involves Central Asia, all the way up to September 11."

On May 4, 2011, Malloy made remarks regarding the killing of Usama Bin Laden, stating:

All the death in Iraq was not caused by bin Laden. The death in Iraq was caused by George W. Bush. Five thousand Americans, tens of thousands permanently damaged and shot to pieces, a million Iraqis dead – that wasn’t bin Laden. That was George Bush. So when does Seal Unit 6, or whatever it’s called, drop in on George Bush? Bush was responsible for a lot more death, innocent death, than bin Laden.

The comment drew critical national attention.

Following the tornado outbreak of March 2–3, 2012, on March 4, 2012, Malloy again received much criticism over remarks he made mocking the religion of the tornado victims: "They keep being killed, you know, their God, if this is where they want to look at it, keeps smashing them into little grease spots on the pavement...the Bible Belt. 'Where they ain't going to let no goddamn science get in the way..."

== Guest hosts ==
- Brad Friedman
- Cary Harrison
- Marc Maron
- Sam Seder
- Johnny Wendell
- Peter Werbe

== Staff ==
- Host: Mike Malloy
- Executive Producer: Kathy Bay
- Webmaster: Ben Burch

== Music ==
- Opening theme
  - First hour: "Run Like Hell" by Pink Floyd (orchestral version)
    - Friday: Friday Is My Day by Z. Z. Hill
  - Second hour: "Sitting at the Wheel" by The Moody Blues
  - Third hour: "The Story in Your Eyes" by The Moody Blues
- Closing theme
  - First hour: "Talking Out of Turn" by The Moody Blues
  - Second hour: "With or Without You" by U2
  - Third hour: "Horéré Ukundé"
    - Friday: "Straight to Hell" by Drivin N Cryin
