= Unequal Protection =

2004 book by Thom Hartmann

- Author: Thom Hartmann
- Language: English
- Genre: Non-fiction
- Publisher: Rodale Books
- Publication date: April 24, 2004
- Pages: 368
- ISBN: 1579549551
- OCLC: 54995431

Unequal Protection: The Rise of Corporate Dominance and the Theft of Human Rights is a 2004 book by Thom Hartmann. According to the book, their CEOs are "unapproachable and live lives of nearly unimaginable wealth and luxury".
