= 1991 in radio =

The year 1991 saw a number of significant events in radio broadcasting history.

== Events ==
- January 11 - KKWM-FM 97.9 in Dallas/Ft. Worth becomes KLRX "Lite 97.9" after Cox assumes ownership from Anchor Media. This change will lead to a station swap nearly three years later and the demise of Tampa Bay's heritage rocker WYNF "95 YNF."
- January 18 – Brian Beirne became one of the few celebrities from radio to get a "star" on the Hollywood Walk of Fame.
- January 23 - KLSK 104.1 in Santa Fe, New Mexico plays Led Zeppelin's Stairway to Heaven repeatedly for 24 hours before launching a classic rock format.
- February 1 – KOZT-FM, Fort Bragg, Mendocino County, California officially becomes "THE COAST" after 48 hours straight of playing the theme from "Twin Peaks". Started (and still run) by former KLOS & KLSX programmer Tom Yates, the station has since been nominated for several Marconi awards and won one in 2002 for Rock Station of the Year.
- February 8 – WROR/Boston flips to Hot AC, branded as "Mix 98.5" and adopts the new call letters WBMX.
- February 26 – WLOL in Minneapolis, Minnesota signs off on 99.5 FM for the last time. Minnesota Public Radio's KSJN takes over on the frequency the following day.
- April 2 - WPLJ in New York City rebrands as "Mojo Radio" after Scott Shannon joins the station as program director and morning show host
- April 10 - WZZT (102.7 FM) launches in Morrison, Illinois.
- May 12 - Aliw Broadcasting Corporation in the Philippines acquired DZPI and starts broadcasts of DWIZ 882 as a news formatted station. Test broadcast of the station lasted for a month.
- May 13 - After 9 months of airing modern rock programming during evening hours with great success, adult contemporary-formatted CIMX/Windsor-Detroit shifts full-time to the format.
- May 17 - Philippine Catholic Radio station DZRV Radio Veritas was acquired by the Global Broadcasting Systems from the Philippine Radio Educational and Information Center, Inc, and at the same time, it started commercial operations as DZNN (known as Kaibigang Totoo (Your True Friend) and The Spirit of the Philippines). DZNN also moved its studios to Makati (later moved to Ortigas) and became home to some of the notable broadcasters such as Louie Beltran, Ramon Tulfo, Rey Langit, Jay Sonza, Orly Punzalan, Joel Reyes-Zobel and Dave Sta. Ana among others.
- July - Granum Communications takes over KMEZ-FM 107.5 in Dallas/Ft. Worth from Gilmore Broadcasting and replaces its soft AC format with soft classic rock as KCDU "CD-107.5."
- August 8 – The Warsaw radio mast, the tallest construction ever built, collapses.
- September 2 - CKFM-FM/Toronto shifts from Mainstream AC to Hot AC and rebrands as "Mix 99.9."
- September 19 - KKBQ-FM (93Q) in Houston flips from CHR/Top 40 to a Country format at midnight. After a month of experimenting with the brief "Rock hits" stint, KKBQ-FM played a continuous audio sample of ocean waves. Then at 6 am KKBQ-FM completed its transition. The station would then be known as "92.9 Easy Country" for several months before ultimately becoming "93Q Country" in 1992.
- October - KHYI 94.9 in Dallas/Ft. Worth drops its top-40 format of roughly 5 years (as Y-95, Power 95 and, later, simply 94.9 FM) to become KODZ "Oldies 94.9."
- December 2 – Buzz Burbank becomes newsman for the Don and Mike Show in the United States.
- December 30 – English service of Radio Luxembourg ceases transmissions on 208 meters in medium wave.
- Classic hits KLXK in Minneapolis, Minnesota flips to hard rock as KRXX ("93X")
- KDBN drops business talk; returns to adult standards as KCMZ.
- Michael and Kay Zwerling purchase KSCO in Santa Cruz, California

== Deaths ==
- January 30 – John McIntire, 83, American character actor
- February 24 – George Gobel, 83, American comedian, radio and television personality
- June 20 – Gerald Priestland, 64, English correspondent
- July 16 - Dwight Weist, 81, American actor and announcer
- September 15 – André Baruch, 83, French-born American radio announcer, news commentator, talk show host, disc jockey, sportscaster, film narrator
- October 31 – Dick Joy, 75, American radio and television announcer and newscaster
- December 14 – John Arlott, 77, English cricket commentator

== See also ==
- Radio broadcasting
