= Nancy Skinner (commentator) =

American environmentalist

Nancy Skinner is a nationally syndicated radio and television commentator, based in Detroit, Michigan.

She has run for political office four times. In 2004, she was a Democratic candidate for an open U.S. Senate seat in Illinois, losing in the Democratic primary election to then-state senator Barack Obama. In 2006, she ran for the United States House of Representatives in Michigan's 9th congressional district in the 2006 elections, losing to the 14-year incumbent Republican, Joe Knollenberg. In 2014, she ran again for the House of Representatives, this time in Michigan's 11th congressional district, losing in the Democratic primary to Bobby McKenzie. In 2018 she again lost in the same primaries to Haley Stevens.

== Early life ==
Skinner was born and raised in Royal Oak, Michigan. She graduated from the University of Michigan in 1987, receiving a BBA degree with an emphasis in finance and accounting.

== Urban development ==
After graduation, Skinner worked for the family of businessman Mike Ilitch, helping to renovate Detroit's Fox Theatre and relocate the Little Caesars International (LCI) corporate headquarters to the Fox Office Building. She also worked on area redevelopment projects in Downtown Detroit, serving on the Grand Circus Park Redevelopment Board and helping plan for the theatre district's future.

== Environmentalism ==
Following the great Midwestern floods of 1993, Skinner persuaded President Bill Clinton's White House to assemble a team of ten federal agencies and the nations' leading architects and engineers to rebuild two entire towns away from the floodplain using the principles of sustainable development. Their efforts were honored with an award from President Bill Clinton's Council on Sustainable Development.

Skinner helped launch the Chicago Climate Exchange (CCX), the first voluntary emissions trading program to address global climate change using free market principles. The exchange ran from 2003 to 2010.

== Radio commentator ==
In 1998, Skinner began co-hosting a progressive weekend radio show called Ski & Skinner on WLS in Chicago where she was fired after announcing, on air, that she was running for the U.S. Senate. In 2000, Skinner became co-host of The Doug Stephan Show, a syndicated national morning show heard on over 400 radio stations across the United States. Skinner's show inspired two listeners, Anita and Sheldon Drobny, to create the Air America Radio Network featuring Al Franken and other liberal radio hosts.

Since 1999, Skinner has been appearing regularly as a commentator on cable news channels CNN, MSNBC and the Fox News Channel. When she was offered the position of morning host at Detroit's progressive Air America talk radio station, WDTW 1310 AM, Skinner returned to her home state of Michigan, where she hosted morning drive.

Skinner substituted for Randi Rhodes and hosted The Randi Rhodes Show from February 5, 2009, through February 13, 2009. On February 16, 2009, The Nancy Skinner Show debuted on the On Second Thought radio network, the successor to the Nova M Radio network.

== Political campaigns ==
In 2004, Skinner ran for the U.S. Senate from Illinois, losing in the Democratic primary to Barack Obama.

Skinner's 2006 campaign in Michigan's 9th district against Joe Knollenberg was initially seen as a long shot; as Knollenberg had double digits margins of victory and Skinner chose to run on the issue of climate change in the seat of the auto industry, where she was endorsed in an ad campaign by Robert Kennedy Jr. for her leadership on the issue. Though the race became more competitive in its final weeks, Knollenberg ultimately defeated Skinner 52 to 46 percent.

After the election, Skinner took a position with the staff of First Gentleman Daniel Mulhern, husband of Michigan governor Jennifer Granholm and was on the Executive Team of Governor Jennifer Granholm. She resigned from this position and on October 16, 2007, Skinner officially announced that she was again running for the 9th congressional district. On February 25, 2008, however, Skinner announced that she was withdrawing from the race rather than face a contentious primary with former Michigan Lottery Commissioner Gary Peters. (Peters went on to win the election.)

In 2014 Skinner ran again for the House of Representatives in Michigan's 11th congressional district. She came in 3rd in the Democratic primary, with 26.5% of the vote. The winner of the Democratic primary, Bobby McKenzie, went on to lose to the Republican nominee, David Trott.
