= The Randi Rhodes Show =

- Genre: Progressive talk radio
- Running time: Weekdays: 2 hours (Eastern) (3:00 pm – 5:00 pm)
- Country of origin: United States
- Home station: WIOD (1992–1994); WJNO (1994–2014); WBZT (2010–2014)
- Syndicates: ProgressiveVoices.com - Dark Horse Broadcasting
- Starring: Randi Rhodes
- Recording studio: Palm Beach County, Florida
- Original release: 1992 (local); March 31, 2004 (national); Online July 5, 2016
- Website: randirhodes.com

The Randi Rhodes Show was a talk radio show hosted by Randi Rhodes. The show combined her progressive political commentary with listener participation and live interviews. It was originally broadcast on Air America Radio, Nova M Radio, and Premiere Networks. The show ended with Premiere on May 16, 2014. The show returned on Monday, June 6, 2016 to April 23, 2025 as a podcast through her website and on Free Speech TV.

== History ==
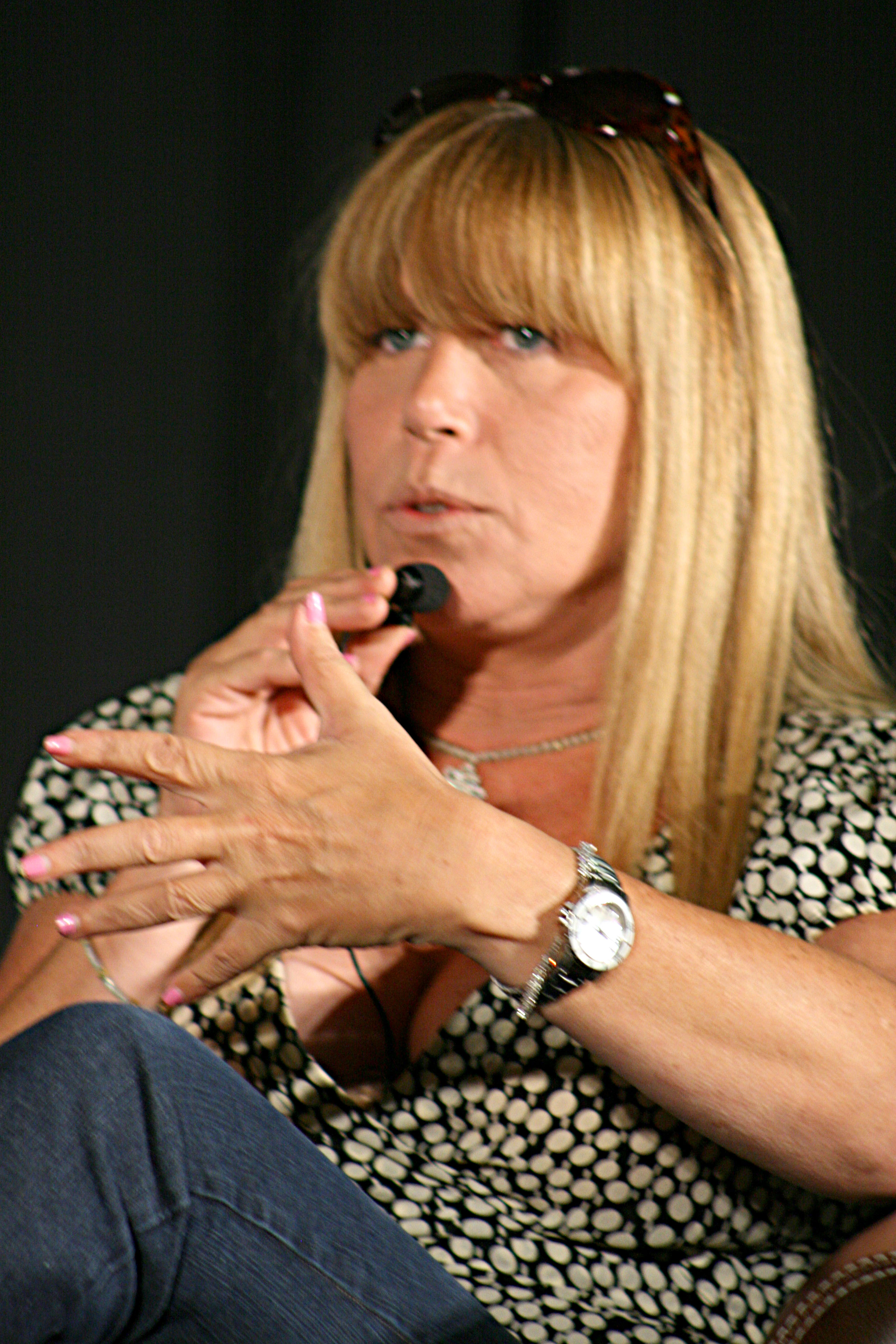
Randi Rhodes (2008)

The Randi Rhodes Show was a local program on WIOD in Miami in 1992 and moved to WJNO in West Palm Beach, Florida in 1994. On March 31, 2004, the program made its national debut on the Air America Radio network. In 2005, the Anti-Defamation League reprimanded Rhodes for comparing Hurricane Katrina refugees with Holocaust victims. The show ran for four hours until September 2006, when it was reduced to three hours.

=== Suspension ===
Despite what Air America stated, Randi Rhodes contended that she was not suspended for comments made about Hillary Clinton. In an appearance on Larry King Live following her departure from Air America, Rhodes explained that the reason for her suspension was not really about the stand-up performance, but rather a ploy to force Rhodes to renegotiate her contract. Rhodes alleged that unless she renegotiated her contract to remove a right in her contract that did not allow Air America to fire her, she would never be permitted to return to the air. Air America suspended her until a settlement could be reached concerning the contract which was still in place and had an additional year to run. In the interim, Air America management decided to conduct market research to assess her value to the company. According to Rhodes, it was Air America who issued the press release that called attention to the video of her performance in San Francisco simply as a way to gauge her audience loyalty and her value to the network. According to Rhodes, Air America soon asked her to return to the air, with an offer of more money but still holding to the condition that she had to amend her contract. Rhodes refused and left Air America because of the stalemate over the new contract.

On April 9, 2008, Air America Radio CEO Charlie Kireker issued a press release stating that Rhodes was leaving the network, in the aftermath of a brief suspension following a controversial live appearance in San Francisco. One of her affiliates, KKGN in San Francisco, California, immediately announced that they would continue airing her show.

=== Nova M Radio (2008-09) ===
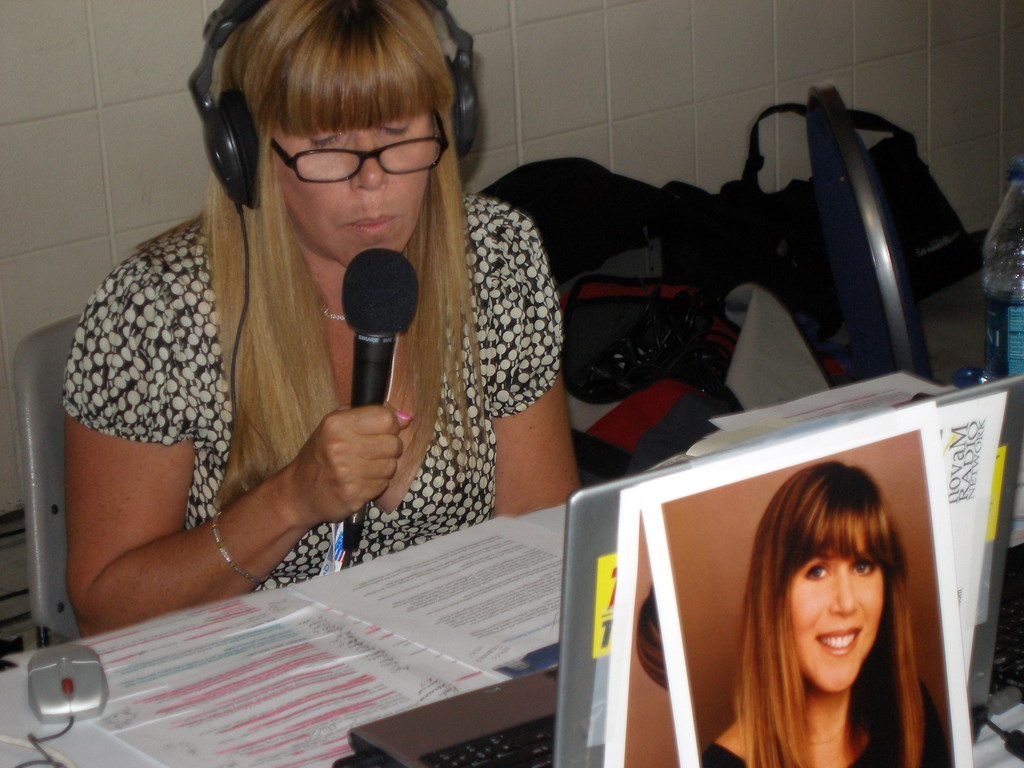
Randi Rhodes broadcasts from the Democratic National Convention in 2008.

On April 10, 2008, Nova M Radio announced that The Randi Rhodes Show would join its radio network, which also syndicated The Mike Malloy Show. During the first broadcast on April 14, 2008, Rhodes went into detail concerning the events surrounding her suspension. She described what happened as "a great radio story and I've heard some great radio stories in my day." The Randi Rhodes show returned to the airwaves on April 21, 2008 on 23 affiliate stations, compared to Air America's 60 affiliates. As of May 5, 2008, the show was heard on 28 stations, including XM 167, the Air America channel on XM Radio.

She also reiterated in this same episode that the issue with Air America was primarily about Air America's new owners demanding her contract be amended to remove her walk-away clause, and that another issue was her high salary.

However, Rhodes stopped broadcasting on Nova M on February 3, 2009, with shows hosted by Nancy Skinner until the closing of the network. A statement from one of the Nova M network owners appeared on their official website, but offered no explanation, claiming terms of Rhodes' contract. The Randi Rhodes Show Web site was temporarily inaccessible on February 16, 2009 but returned online later that day with the following statement:

To all:

Nova M Radio has not yet corrected the problem that has kept me off the air despite my strong desire and readiness to broadcast my show. Respecting the employer-employee relationship that has existed between nova m and me, and expecting the solution to be quickly achieved, details of the triggering event were withheld in good faith. But I can tell you this much: Any statement implicating me as being in any way responsible for the disruption in The Randi Rhodes Show is patently false.

This entire situation is solely within the control of Nova M.

In light of most recent developments, my show will be seeking a new home. I would ask for your continued patience and indulgence in respecting my rights during this time. Your unwavering support is cherished. Thank you.

RANDI RHODES

Nova M ceased operations a few days later.

=== Premiere Radio Networks (2009-14) ===
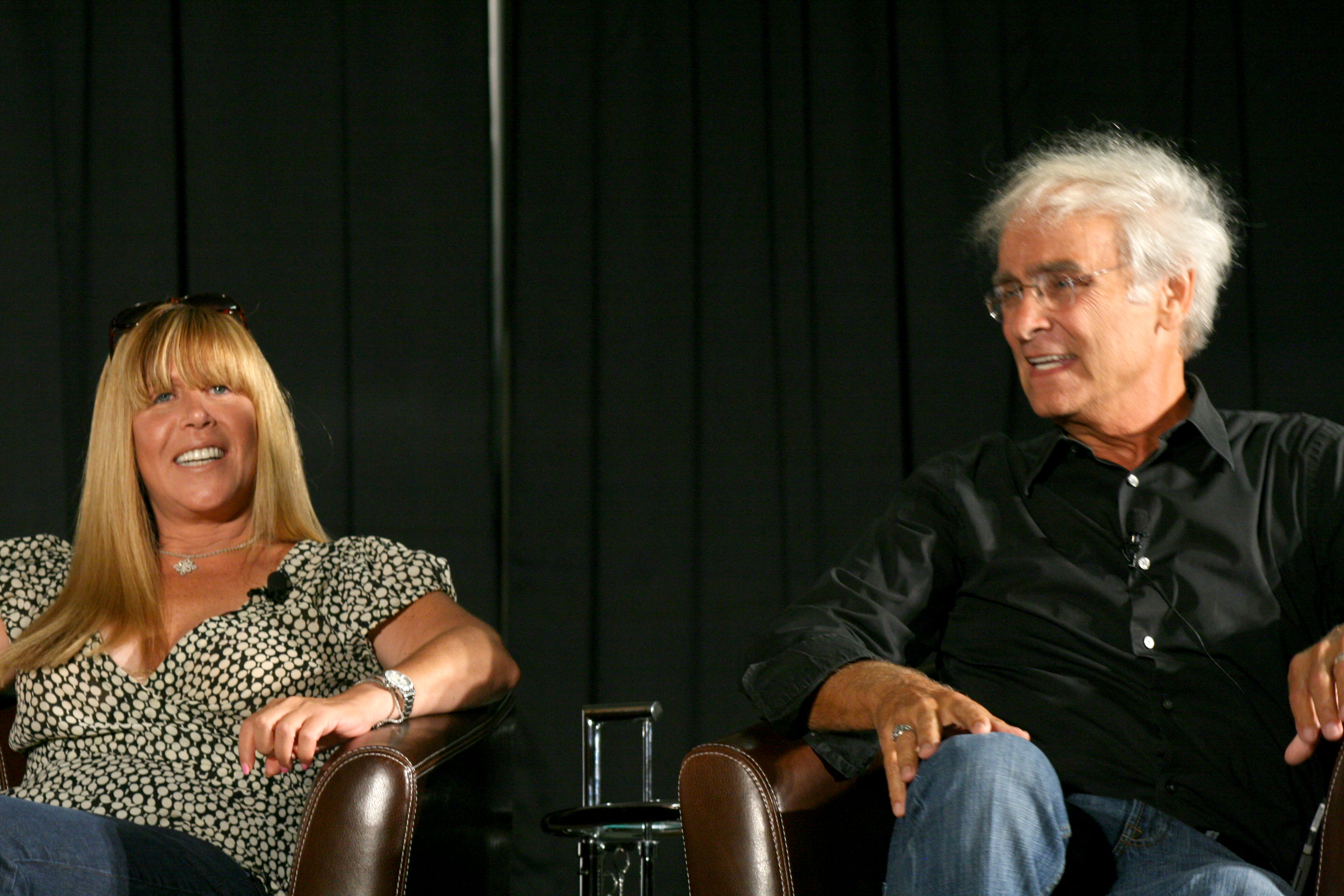
Randi Rhodes and talk show host, Mike Malloy

On April 23, 2009, The Randi Rhodes Show became part of the Premiere Radio Networks affiliate network. Premiere announced that Rhodes would be joining the network beginning May 11, 2009, and would air daily in the 3-6 PM Eastern time slot. The show was based out of Washington, D.C. and can be heard on XM Satellite Radio's 'Talk Radio' channel 168.

In March 2010, WJNO replaced Rhodes with The Schnitt Show, and WBZT began carrying the Rhodes show live in her local West Palm Beach area. WJNO continued to play Randi Rhodes on tape delay in evenings.

The Randi Rhodes Show ended on May 16, 2014.

=== Dark Horse Broadcasting (June 2016-April 2025) ===
As of February 11, 2016, Randi Rhodes started a Kickstarter campaign to return, this time her show appears to not be returning to radio, but live streaming on the internet. Her Kickstarter campaign raised $152,064. According to her Kickstarter page entry on May 5, 2016, the Randi Rhodes Show returned on Monday, June 6, 2016. Construction of new studios in South Florida delayed her first broadcast.

The Randi Rhodes Show can now be heard and seen live weekdays from 3 to 5pm ET via Periscope, Progressive Voices Network with their app and Randi's - YouTube, Facebook, Tunein pages, as a paid podcast to subscribers, and is also available on Free Speech TV - DishTV (ch. 9415), DirecTV (ch. 348), Roku, AppleTV & Sling. The following radio stations have the Randi Rhodes Show on tape deal: Minneapolis, MN: 950 KTFN (10p-Mid.)[19.] San Bernardino: 102.3/1050 KCAA (2-3p) [20.] Santa Fe, NM: 103.7/1260 KTRC (6-8p) [21.] San Francisco, CA: 910 KKSF (5-7p) [22.]

The final episode was broadcast on April 23, 2025. On May 20, 2025, Rhodes announced on her Substack blog that she had been diagnosed with lung cancer due to a history of smoking, motivating her to end her broadcast.

== Music ==
- Friday Theme: "Bounce Your Boobies" at the beginning of the program.
