= Brian Burns =

Brian Burns may refer to:

- Brian Burns (American football) (born 1998), American football player
- Brian Burns (screenwriter), American screenwriter and film producer
- Brian D. Burns (born 1939), former Vermont Lieutenant Governor
- Brian P. Burns (1936–2021), American entrepreneur, attorney and philanthropist
- Bryan E. Burns (born 1970), American archeologist

== See also ==
- Brian Byrne (disambiguation)
