= 1989 in radio =

The year 1989 saw a number of significant events in radio broadcasting.

== Events ==
- KMEZ breaks away from its FM sister station to adopt a business-oriented news/talk format as KDBN.
- ABC Radio has acquired Satellite Music Network. This division is now known as "ABC Music Radio".
- The NBC Radio Network ceases to operate as a separate programming service; owner Westwood One merges it with the Mutual Broadcasting System, moving the networks' news and engineering departments from New York to Mutual's facilities in Arlington. The lone non-news program that remains on NBC Radio, the Sunday-morning religious program The Eternal Light, is also canceled.
- January – KSTT (1170 AM) of Davenport, Iowa switches from a solid gold oldies format (which had been in place since 1986) to simulcasting WXLP (96.9 FM), in addition to increasing its sports broadcasts.
- January 19 – WIOQ in Philadelphia switches from oldies to a Top 40 format becomes Q102.
- March 17 – 100.3 FM in Los Angeles becomes KQLZ (Pirate Radio).
- May 1 – At the grand opening of the Disney's Hollywood Studios, the most attended studio-park in the world, it chooses Pittsburgh's KDKA-AM as its inaugural guest broadcaster in its interactive radio studios.
- May 1 – KIIK-FM of Davenport, Iowa switches from a contemporary hit radio format (which had been in place since 1972) to oldies, and its call letters to KUUL-FM. The station's signature "KUUL Red Radio" is unveiled shortly thereafter and appears at the station's live remote broadcasts.
- May 24 – The last NBC Radio owned-and-operated station, KNBR 680-AM in San Francisco, is sold off to Susquehanna Broadcasting (which merges with Cumulus in 2005). KNBR changes from an adult contemporary format to all-sports the following year, a format it continues to hold.
- July 17 – DZBB 594, GMA Network's flagship AM station in Metro Manila, Philippines, officially rebrands as Bisig Bayan DZBB 594 Their new identity makes the station more popular to radio listeners in Metro Manila. Rafael "Paeng" Yabut, Bobby Guanzon, Lito Villarosa, Rene Jose, Rey Pacheco, Raul Virtudazo, Jimmy Gil, Arman Roque, Rose "Manang Rose" Clores, German Moreno, Inday Badiday, Helen Vela and Pol Caguiat are the personalities of the Bisig Bayan era.
- July 29 – KCPW/Kansas City drops its top-40 format as "Power 95" and becomes KCMO-FM "Oldies 95."
- August 19 – United Kingdom and Netherlands radio regulatory authorities conduct an armed raid on offshore pirate radio station Radio Caroline in which equipment is disabled or confiscated.
- October 9 – KSJN (AM) in Minneapolis, Minnesota becomes KNOW.
- August 23 - In August it was announced that WLS would become a talk radio station by the autumn. On Wednesday August 23, 1989 the music came to an end at WLS. After over 29 years, the station was about to change to an issue-oriented "hot talk" format like its sister station 77WABC in New York did back in 1982.
- November – WQXI flips callsigns to WSTR, becoming Star 94 in Atlanta.
- November 9 – A news conference broadcast live across East Germany announces opening of the Berlin Wall.
- November 13 – London Greek Radio, one of the United Kingdom's first all-ethnic radio stations, begins broadcasting.
- December – Kayla Satellite Network purchases Chuck Harder's Sun Radio Network (forerunner to I.E. America Radio Network. Harder's show was soon dropped from the network and he later started a new radio network, the Peoples Radio Network.
- December 11 – Dallas/Ft. Worth's heritage rocker KZEW 97.9 "The Zoo" flips to Christmas music.
- December 26 – 570 AM and 97.9 FM in Dallas/Ft. Worth flip to soft AC as "Warm 97.9." The change will not bring a complete simulcast, however, as some college sports programming on the now-former KLDD 570 "K-Oldie" will remain on 570. Call letter changes to KKWM and KKWM-FM will follow.

== Debuts ==
- March – Mark Belling joins WISN in Milwaukee, Wisconsin.
- KDWN in Las Vegas, Nevada offers Art Bell a five-hour radio talk show time slot in the middle of the night, which later evolved into Coast to Coast AM.

== Deaths ==
- January 10: Herbert Morrison, American radio reporter (born 1905)
- January 29: Mandel Kramer, American radio actor (born 1916)
- January 30: Pegeen Fitzgerald, American radio talk-show host (both alone and with her husband, Ed) on WOR and WJZ in New York City and Norcatur, Kansas (born 1904)
- July 10: Tommy Trinder, English radio, stage and screen comedian (born 1909)
- August 22: Lord Hill, British physician, medical and broadcast executive, politician and "The Radio Doctor" (born 1904)
- September 20: Ruth Bailey, American radio actress (born 1913)
- October 22: Ewan MacColl, British folk singer-songwriter, actor and labour activist, co-creator of the radio ballad (born 1915)

== See also ==
- Radio broadcasting
