= Brice Phillips =

American radio operator

Brice Phillips is an amateur radio operator (KB5MPW) in Hancock County, Mississippi. He operates WQRZ-LP, a low-powered FM station. He gained national media attention for his efforts during the Hurricane Katrina disaster, both in warning people to evacuate and in directing survivors to relief centers.
