= Harvey Ovshinsky =

American journalist (born 1948)

Harvey Kurek Ovshinsky
- Harvey Ovshinsky, circa 1970
- Born: April 9, 1948 (age 78)
- Occupations: film maker, author, journalist, teacher, story consultant

Harvey Kurek Ovshinsky (born April 9, 1948) is an American writer, story consultant, media producer, and teacher, and has been described as "one of this country’s finest storytellers" by the Detroit News. The Metro Times called Ovshinsky's career chronicling life in Detroit during the 1960s, 70s, 80s, and 90s "a colorful and fantastic voyage, at times brave and visionary," spanning the universe of print, broadcast television and radio, and digital storytelling.

== Biography ==
Ovshinsky was raised in Detroit, Michigan and attended Mumford High School. In 1965, at age 17, he founded and edited Fifth Estate, one of the earliest and longest-running underground newspapers. Fifth Estate has been continuously published to this day with the help of staffers like Peter Werbe who have worked on the paper since soon after its establishment. Ovshinsky served as editor until 1968, when he was drafted and became a conscientious objector to the war in Vietnam. In 1970 (age 21), he was hired as news director of WABX, Detroit’s alternative FM radio station.

In 1986, Ovshinsky founded and began to serve as president of HKO Media, an award-winning consulting and production firm. He received in 1992 a Peabody Award and in 1993 a National Emmy for the documentary Close to Home: The Tammy Boccomino Story, a film about the experiences of a mother and son with HIV. In 1994, Ovshinsky was also awarded an Alfred I. duPont–Columbia University Award Silver Baton and a Cine Golden Eagle Film and Video Competition Award for The Last Hit, a documentary film concerning youth violence. In 2004, he received a Career Achievement Award for his films from the Detroit Docs International Film Festival. Ovshinsky is the recipient of 15 Regional Emmys from the Michigan Chapter of the National Academy of Television Arts and Sciences.

While director of production at Detroit Public Television, Ovshinsky was one of the supervisors of the Oscar-nominated, Peabody- and duPont-winning documentary Who Killed Vincent Chin? Working with WDIV-TV, WXYZ-TV, and Detroit Public Television, he produced a variety of award-winning primetime television programs about Detroit and its citizens, including: A Gift for Serena, City Nights, The Deerhunters, Santa Claus is Alive & Living in Detroit, and The Voodoo Man of Heidelberg Street, which was about famed Detroit artist Tyree Guyton. Ovshinsky’s landmark documentary, Land Grab: The Taking of Poletown, was featured in Jeanie Wylie’s book, Poletown: A Community Betrayed, and excerpts of the documentary were shown on CBS’s Sunday Morning program. Ovshinsky also executive produced Miracle on Fort Street, a documentary about an inner city choir’s inspiring efforts to perform Handel’s Messiah. The New York Times described Miracle as "a lovely piece of work that manages to be warming without being the slightest sentimental" [sic].

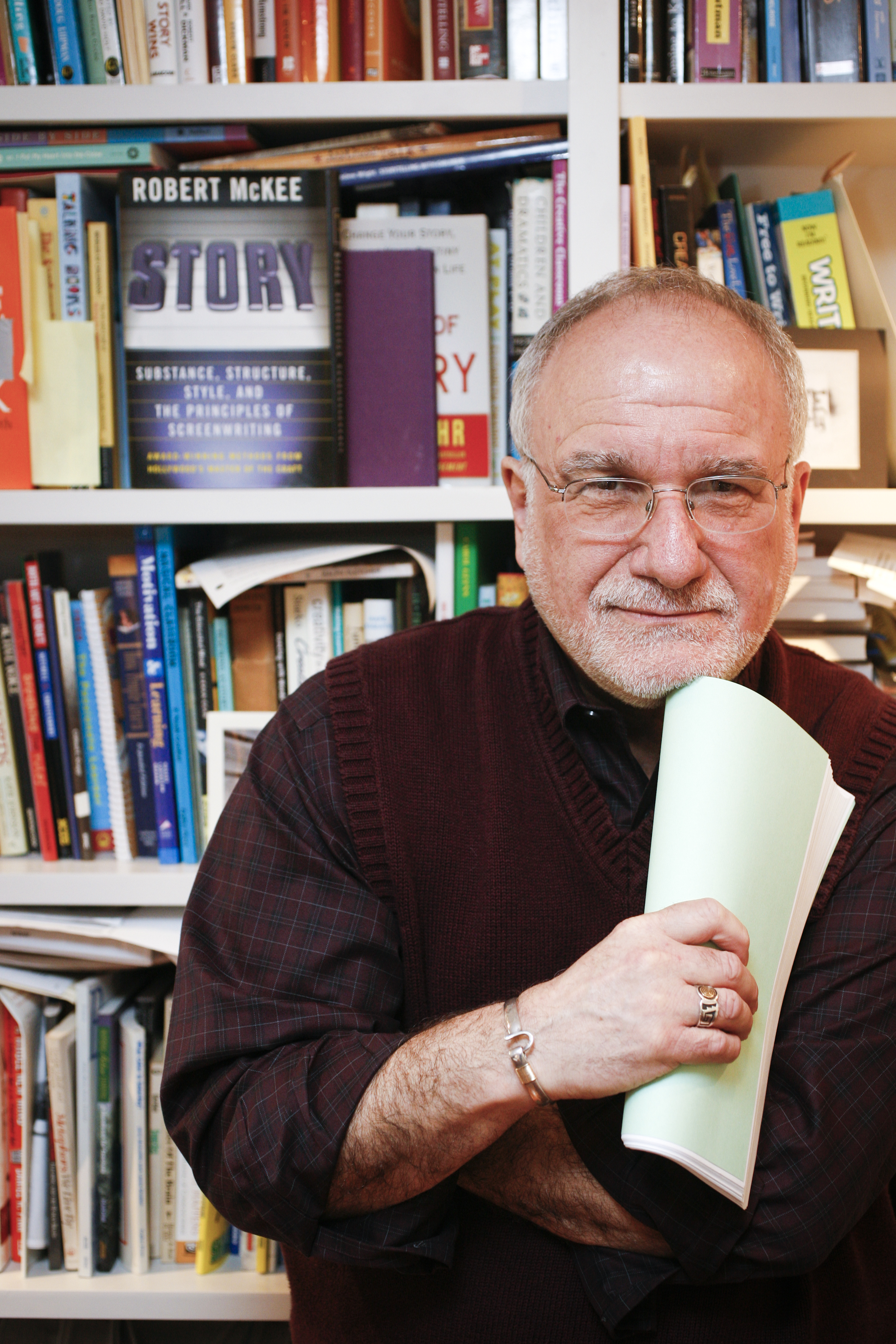
Harvey Ovshinsky

Ovshinsky’s stories each share a common theme: "They’re about communicating," wrote The Grosse Pointe News, "and people rising above their differences in order to get along." According to The Jewish News, he "tells stories of struggle and truth in the Motor City."

Ovshinsky wrote the Movie-of-the-Week script PJ and the Dragon for Longbow Productions, and in 1998 earned a Best Screenplay Writer Award – Honorable Mention from the New York International Independent Film and Video Festival for The Keyman.

Ovshinsky hosted the weekend talk shows Spare Change and Night Call. His talk show Harvey O on the Metro was later broadcast on Detroit public radio station WDET-FM.

Ovshinsky has taught at Detroit Public Schools as a Writer-in-Residence with InsideOut Literary Arts, a literary arts project for students that places professional writers in Detroit schools. He has also taught at the College for Creative Studies, Wayne State University, Madonna University, and Washtenaw Community College, and has guest lectured about creativity and storytelling at the University of Michigan, Michigan State University, Eastern Michigan University, and Schoolcraft College.

Ovshinsky’s mother was Norma Marks, an art teacher. His father was autodidact inventor Stanford R. Ovshinsky. Ovshinsky met his wife, Cathie Kurek-Ovshinsky, at Detroit’s Lafayette Clinic when she was a psychiatric nurse and he was a conscientious objector during the Vietnam War.

Harvey Ovshinsky’s life and work is documented in the Harvey K. Ovshinsky Collection housed at the Bentley Historical Library at the University of Michigan.
