= Brian L. Byrne =

Australian social scientist

Brian J. Byrne
- Born: 1942 (age 82–83)
- Education: Bachelor of Arts; Doctor of Philosophy
- Alma mater: University of Sydney; McMaster University
- Occupation(s): Social scientist and emeritus professor
- Known for: Applied and psycholinguistics

Brian J. Byrne (born 1942) is an Australian social scientist specializing in applied and psycholinguistics, an emeritus professor at the University of New England in Australia, and lead author of publications and articles on research in his field. Byrne was a lead researcher in the 10-year-long, $5 million National Institutes of Health study by an international team of scientists into the development of reading ability in 1,000 pairs of twins. Beginning in 2000, the study found that genetics were more important influences on reading development than environmental factors. In 2012, Byrne was appointed a lead researcher in a similar Australian study of twins.

== Twins linguistics research ==
In 2000, Byrne and the Department of Psychology at the University of New England (UNE), with support from the Australian Research Council, were selected by the United States National Institute of Health to take part in a $US5 million study of the development of reading ability in children. The study also included research teams in Colorado, Nevada, and Norway and other prominent social scientists such as John C. DeFries. The study used twins as its research subjects in order to better examine the impact of genetics versus environmental factors in the development of reading ability. UNE's share of the funding was $US1.14 million over five years. The Australian portion of the project initially studied eighty pairs of identical and fraternal twins from Sydney and Melbourne listed in the National Health and Medical Research Council's Twins Registry based at the University of Melbourne.

In 2008, the researchers published the results of their research, finding that genetic factors were more influential than environmental ones in the development of reading ability in children. Byrne cautioned, however, that, "Intensive and well-designed classroom and preschool interventions can make a difference for struggling readers." Byrne was subsequently selected in 2012 as lead researcher for a follow-on study of 2,000 twins listed in the National Literacy and Numeracy Assessment.

== Selected publications ==
- Byrne, Brian (1981). Living in Australia: A Social Education Programme. Teacher's Handbook. Melbourne: Longman Cheshire. p. 50. ISBN 9780582666856. OCLC 27499133.
- Byrne, Brian & Marie Carroll (May 1989). "Learning Artificial Orthographies: Further Evidence of a Nonanalytic Acquisition Procedure". Memory & Cognition. 17 (3): 311–317. doi:10.3758/BF03198469. ISSN 0090-502X. PMID 2725268.
- Byrne, Brian (1992). Little Speech Scientists: Phonemic Awareness in Early Literacy Development. North Sydney, New South Wales: Board of Studies. p. 16. ISBN 9780730599296. OCLC 221213877.
- Byrne, Brian; Fielding-Barnsley, Ruth; Ashley, Luise (December 1996). "What Does the Child Bring to the Task of Learning to Read? A Summary of the New England Acquisition Projects". Australian Journal of Psychology. 48 (3): 119–123. doi:10.1080/00049539608259517. ISSN 0004-9530.
- Byrne, Brian (1998). The Foundation of Literacy: The Child's Acquisition of the Alphabetic Principle. Hove, East Sussex: Psychology Press. p. 162. ISBN 9780863778186. OCLC 39364833.
- Byrne, B.; Coventry, W. L.; Olson, R. K.; Hulslander, J.; Wadsworth, S.; DeFries, J. C.; Corley, R.; Willcutt, E. G. & Samuelsson, S. (February 2008). "A Behaviour-Genetic Analysis of Orthographic Learning, Spelling and Decoding". Journal of Research in Reading. 31 (1): 8–21. doi:10.1111/j.1467-9817.2007.00358.x. ISSN 0141-0423.
