= Randi Rhodes =

American radio host (born 1958)

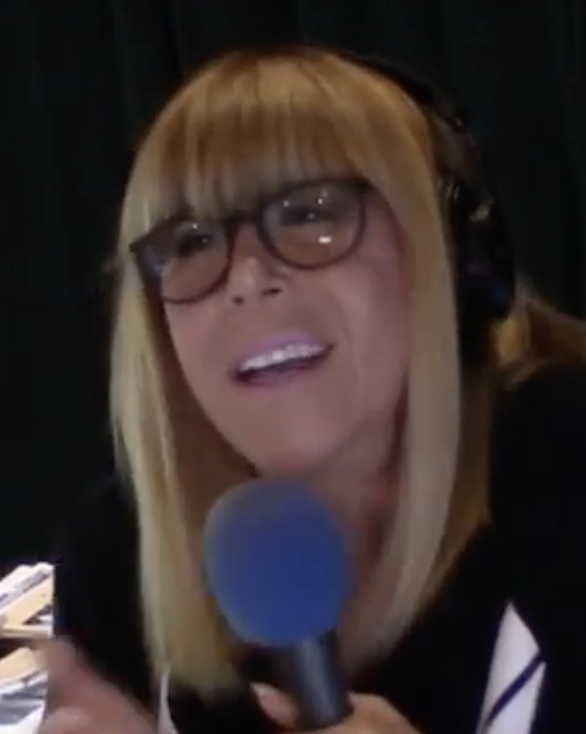
- Randi Rhodes in 2016
- Born: Randi Joyce Bueten; January 28, 1959 (age 67); Brooklyn, New York, United States
- Other names: Randi Joyce Robertson; Randi St. John
- Occupation: Talk radio show host
- Known for: The Randi Rhodes Show
- Website: randirhodes.com

Randi Joyce Robertson (née Bueten; born January 28, 1958), better known by her air name Randi Rhodes, is an American progressive political commentator, activist and talk radio host. The Randi Rhodes Show is live streamed having been previously broadcast nationally on Air America Radio, Nova M Radio, and Premiere Radio Networks.

== Early life ==
Rhodes was born Randi Joyce Bueten in Brooklyn, New York, to a Jewish family. Randi grew up in the Brooklyn and Queens boroughs of New York City, her father was a mechanical engineer and World War II veteran and her mother was a dress shop worker; they divorced by the time Rhodes was 15 years old.

Rhodes has described her adolescence as mischievous and cites it as why she enlisted in the United States Air Force. Her married name is Randi Robertson.

Rhodes is a radio name chosen to honor Ozzy Osbourne's guitar player Randy Rhoads, whom Rhodes describes as "a consummate professional ... but he always practiced. I mean, he practiced eight hours a day. He lived to be the best."

== Military experience ==
Rhodes enlisted in the United States Air Force and worked stateside at McGuire Air Force Base in New Jersey as an aircraft mechanic, achieving the rank of Airman first class (E-3). She served two years in the Air Force and one year in the reserves. Rhodes went through basic training at Lackland Air Force Base in San Antonio, Texas. From there she went to Sheppard Air Force Base in Wichita Falls, Texas, and was being trained as a flight engineer.

After she transferred to what would be her permanent station in New Jersey, she decided to leave the active-duty Air Force through the Palace Chase program and was honorably discharged after three years service (two active duty and one reserve) at the age of 21.

In the 1980 presidential election, Rhodes voted for Republican candidate Ronald Reagan, explaining: "I was young and stupid and sick of the gas lines", but never voted Republican again.

== Radio career ==
=== Early work ===
Rhodes' radio career began in Seminole, Texas at a country music station. Her next job was in a larger market, Mobile, Alabama. While in Mobile, she was paired briefly with a male DJ (also named Randy) for the "Randy and Randi" morning show. This was her first experience with extemporaneous dialogue other than reading cue cards between records. She used this experience as a spring-board to larger markets. In the late 1980s, she was hired out of that medium market directly to New York City by WAPP "The Apple", owned at the time by Doubleday Broadcasting. While working for WAPP, she took the name "Randi Rhodes," having previously used "Randi St. John".

While teaming with host Perry Stone at Milwaukee's WQFM, Rhodes was suspended in 1987 when their program offended the gay community and led several businesses to cancel ads.

In late September 1992, Rhodes started on WIOD in Miami, working the 8P-11P night shift. The Miami Herald described her as "a chain-smoking bottle blond, ... part Joan Rivers, part shock jock Howard Stern and part Saturday Night Live's 'Coffee Talk' lady. But mostly, she's her rude, crude, loud, brazen, gleeful self."

=== Air America Radio (2004–2008) ===
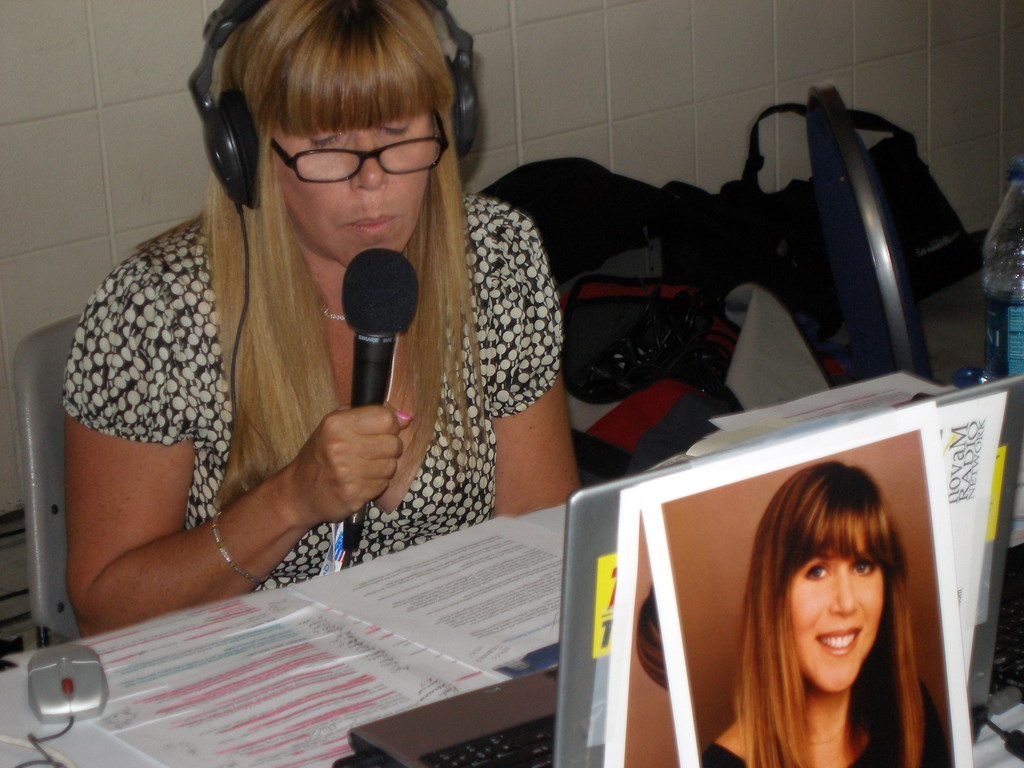
Randi Rhodes broadcasts from the Democratic National Convention in 2008.

In 2004, Rhodes joined Air America Radio, bringing The Randi Rhodes Show to a national audience for the first time. Rhodes' show on Air America consisted principally of monologue and listener calls, with a short comedic segment at the beginning of the show's second and third hours. Only occasionally did she do interviews. The show was punctuated with musical interludes, including the show's unofficial theme song, Pain by Stereomud. On Fridays, Rhodes opened the show with the song "Bounce Your Boobies" by Rusty Warren. With her distinctive Brooklyn-Queens accent, she would take calls spanning the political spectrum, aggressively promoting her views.

In 2007, Rhodes was recognized by the radio industry's well known periodical, Talkers Magazine as Woman of the Year.

==== Reports of mugging ====
In October 2007, rumors of Rhodes having been mugged in New York were fueled by Air America host Jon Elliott, who had said she was attacked at 39th and Park Avenue while walking her dog, Simon on October 14. Elliott also said Rhodes lost several teeth, and speculated the attack could have been part of a right-wing conspiracy.

On October 17, the New York Daily News reported Rhodes never filed a police report, nor did she claim to be the victim of a mugging. Rhodes' attorney confirmed Rhodes was injured in a fall while walking her dog, and said Rhodes wasn't sure how it had happened. Elliott issued an apology for his on-air comments.

==== Departure from Air America ====
Air America suspended Rhodes from the network on April 3, 2008, after an event in San Francisco for Air America affiliate KKGN. While doing a stand-up comedy act, Rhodes said on March 22, 2008:

"Geraldine Ferraro turned out to be the David Duke in drag ... What a whore Geraldine Ferraro is! She's such a fucking whore! I wanna see her have to stand beside her husband at one of those mandatory 'I have sinned against you; I'm a whore' kind of a press conference. Mr. Ferraro should have to stand next to his whore of a wife ... Hillary is a big fucking whore, too. You know why she's a big fucking whore? Because her deal is always, 'Read the fine print, asshole!'"

When a video of the event was made public the following week, Air America suspended her for "inappropriate comments". The event was billed as "An Evening with Randi Rhodes" and promoted on KKGN's website. Geraldine Ferraro called for Rhodes' employment to be terminated when the personal attacks directed towards her and Clinton began circulating through the media.

Rhodes claimed that Air America breached its contract with her, and questioned the network's commitment to free speech.

On April 10, 2008, Rhodes went on Larry King Live to clarify her suspension from the network. Later that evening, she conducted an interview on The Mike Malloy Show in which Rhodes went into greater detail concerning the suspension. Air America had recently been sold. The new owner read her existing contract and wanted to amend two details: Rhodes' right to terminate at any time, and a clause that said Air America could not terminate Rhodes for any reason without paying her. Rhodes refused to amend the contract, which she said took "seven months to negotiate with the previous owners."

Air America suspended her until a settlement could be reached concerning the contract which was still in place and had an additional year to run. In the interim, Air America management decided to conduct market research to assess her value to the company. According to Rhodes, it was Air America which released the press release that called attention to the video of her performance in San Francisco simply as a way to gauge her audience loyalty and her value to the network. She also claimed Air America soon asked her to return to the air, with an offer of more money but still holding to the condition that she had to change her contract "in order to get her mic back". Rhodes refused and left Air America because of the stalemate over the new contract.

Mark Green, President of Air America Radio, said, "Her abusive, obscene comments obviously crossed the line of what talent at a media company could say," and added that the comments "were in the Imus league", referring to radio host Don Imus, who was fired by CBS Radio in 2007 after making racial remarks about female basketball players. According to a published account, Green said the company had asked Rhodes to apologize for the remarks. In the same account, Rhodes said she did not refuse to apologize for the comment.

Air America Media informed Rhodes on April 9 that the contract was terminated. Air America president Mark Green issued a statement wishing Rhodes well, and thanking her for her work with Air America. Meanwhile, KKGN announced on its website that The Randi Rhodes Show would return to Green 960 as of April 14, 2008.

Air America also terminated access to The Randi Rhodes Show web site, redirecting it to a statement by the chairman and president on the Air America site. Rhodes stated at 3:42pm, EDT on April 14 that she, not Air America, owns the URL name. The message board was reinstated on May 5, 2008.

=== Nova M Radio (2008–2009) ===
On April 10, 2008, Nova M Radio announced Rhodes would join its radio network, which also syndicated The Mike Malloy Show. During the show's first Nova M broadcast on April 14, 2008, Rhodes went into detail concerning the events surrounding her suspension. She described what happened as "a great radio story and I've heard some great radio stories in my day." The Randi Rhodes show returned to the airwaves on April 21, 2008, on 23 affiliate stations, compared to Air America's 60 affiliates. As of May 5, 2008, the show was heard on 28 stations, including XM 167.

On her program's inaugural Nova M Radio broadcast she also said that she had objected to Air America's new owners demanding her contract be amended to remove her walk-away clause. She said her salary was also an issue.

Rhodes' last show on Nova M was February 3, 2009. Political commentator and one-time Congressional candidate Nancy Skinner hosted the show in Rhodes' absence beginning February 5.

Following this, Anita Drobny of Nova M Radio posted a message on the Nova M site saying that they were unable to disclose details of what was going on due to Rhodes' having complete control of the show and that Rhodes "now has to make her decisions as to what she must do with her career". Drobny also said, "People are saying it's about money. It's not about money at all. I just could not fulfill one of her requirements." She did, however, note the financial impact of Rhodes' departure: "I looked at [our] site, and I see that because Randi Rhodes isn't on, there are so many people leaving the Founders Club [which involved a fee that was paid to Nova M]. And you can't operate without people's participation."

Additionally, Rhodes' own website was taken down and replaced with a letter from Rhodes to her supporters stating that the entire situation was within Nova M's control and any implication that Rhodes was responsible for the disruption was false, and that Rhodes' show would be "seeking a new home" in light of those developments.

According to an individual familiar with the issue, Nova M agreed to provide certain standard legal protections for the popular radio host, but Rhodes had to leave the air and discovered that Nova M had not lived up to its contractual promise. Subsequently, on February 19, 2009, Nova M Radio announced that it would be filing for bankruptcy liquidation. The Nova M Radio website was taken down in April 2009.

=== Premiere Radio Networks (2009–2014) ===
On April 23, 2009, Premiere Radio Networks, a subsidiary of Clear Channel Communications, announced the addition of Randi Rhodes to their syndicated lineup with her show returning to airways across the country May 11, 2009. Her eponymous program, The Randi Rhodes Show, aired live Monday through Friday from 3pm to 6pm Eastern Time. Her show ended on May 16, 2014.

=== Dark Horse Broadcasting (2016-2025) ===
In 2016, Randi Rhodes initiated a Kickstarter campaign to return The Randi Rhodes Show from which she received 1,951 pledges in the amount of $152,063. The show began live streaming publicly on July 5, 2016, four days after it was streamed privately to supporters of the Kickstarter campaign.

Starting in 2024, Rhodes broadcast her series on Free Speech TV and on her website, in addition to a handful of radio stations. The final episode was broadcast on April 23, 2025.

== Personal life ==
In 1994 Rhodes married Jim Robertson, an independent television producer and cameraman. They had been together for ten years before marrying. Rhodes and Robertson divorced in April 2004 but have remained friends. Rhodes took the name Robertson when she married, but continued to use her professionally known name on the air.

In 1998, Rhodes' sister Ellen died of breast cancer at age 44. Rhodes and Robertson raised Ellen's daughter Jessica as their own.

Rhodes' partner is Howard Vine, a former partner in the Public Policy practice of Dickstein Shapiro. Previously, he was founder and managing shareholder of the Greenberg Traurig Washington DC office. Now retired, he is a board member of Faith in America, a group working to end harm to LGBT youth caused by religious teachings. He was an adviser to the Clinton/Gore transition team. In 2007, Washingtonian magazine named Mr. Vine one of Washington, DC's "50 Top Lobbyists."

On May 20, 2025, Rhodes announced on her Substack blog that she had been diagnosed with lung cancer due to a history of smoking, motivating her to end her broadcast as she began chemotherapy.
