= Bryan E. Burns =

American archaeologist

- Born: June 25, 1970 (age 56); Florida, USA
- Awards: James R. Wiseman Book Award

Academic background
- Education: BA, University of North Carolina; M.A., Ph.D., Classical art and archaeology, 1999, University of Michigan
- Thesis: Mycenaean Greece, Mediterranean commerce, and the formation of identity (1999)

Bryan E. Burns (born June 25, 1970) is an American archaeologist. He is a professor of Classical Studies at Wellesley College and co-director of the Eastern Boeotia Archaeological Project. His thesis turned book Mycenaean Greece, Mediterranean Commerce, and the Formation of Identity received the 2014 James R. Wiseman Book Award from the Archaeological Institute of America.

== Early life and education ==
Burns was born on June 25, 1970, in Florida. He earned his Bachelor of Arts degree from the University of North Carolina and his Master's degree and PhD from the University of Michigan.

== Career ==
Upon earning his PhD in Classical art and archaeology, Burns joined the faculty at the University of Southern California until 2008 when he accepted a position at Wellesley College. Within his first few years at Wellesley, Burns earned a fellowship at Harvard University's Center for Hellenic Studies. He also published his first book, a reimagination of his thesis titled Mycenaean Greece, Mediterranean Commerce, and the Formation of Identity which focused on the perception, formation, and development of Mycenaean identity. The book later earned the 2014 James R. Wiseman Book Award from the Archaeological Institute of America.

As co-director of the Eastern Boeotia Archaeological Project, Burns also spends his summer with students excavating a Bronze Age settlement in Greece. Burns regularly takes students from Wellesley college to Greece through the Eastern Boeotia Archaeological Project Field School as part of an international team of scholars and students that participate in the excavation project at Eleon.
