= Fifth Estate (periodical) =

American periodical

- Cover of issue 385, Fall 2011
- Categories: Post-left anarchism
- Frequency: Three issues per year
- First issue: 1965; 61 years ago
- Company: Fifth Estate Newspaper
- Country: United States
- Language: English
- Website: fifthestate.org
- ISSN: 0015-0800

Fifth Estate is a U.S. anarchist, anti-capitalist periodical, based in Detroit, Michigan, begun in 1965.

== History ==
Fifth Estate was started by Harvey Ovshinsky, a seventeen-year-old youth from Detroit. He was inspired by a 1965 summer trip to California where he worked on the Los Angeles Free Press, the first underground paper in the United States; Harvey's father, inventor Stan Ovshinsky, knew the editor of the Free Press, Art Kunkin, from their years as comrades in the Socialist Party. The first issue was published on November 19, 1965.

The spirit of the paper during the first ten years of its existence was summed up in a Feb. 1, 1969, staff editorial:

We believe that people who are serious in their criticism of this society and their desire to change it must involve themselves in serious revolutionary struggle. We do not believe that music is revolution. We do not believe that dope is revolution. We do not believe that poetry is revolution. We see these as part of a burgeoning revolutionary culture. They cannot replace political struggle as the main means by which the capitalist system will be destroyed. The Man will not allow his social and economic order to be taken from him by Marshall amps and clashing cymbals. Ask the Cubans, the Vietnamese or urban American blacks what lengths the system is willing to go to, to preserve itself.

By 1972 the optimism of the sixties had worn off and the tone of the paper became more concerned with struggle than fun. Ovshinsky had left in 1969, leaving a group of young people (teenagers or people in their early twenties) to run the paper. Peter Werbe, a 29-year-old Michigan State University dropout who had been with the paper since March 1966, took over as editor. The staff sent delegations to Vietnam, Cambodia and Cuba. The massive defeat of George McGovern and the election of Richard Nixon for a second term with an increased vote damaged the movement — many underground papers ceased publication and alternative news agencies such as the Liberation News Service, and the Underground Press Syndicate were beginning to collapse. The Fifth Estate was mentioned in the national press when one of its reporters, Pat Halley, threw a shaving cream pie at Guru Maharaj Ji in 1973. Though the guru forgave him publicly, two of his followers attacked Halley a week later and fractured his skull.

In 2002, the center of the magazine shifted from Detroit, Michigan to Liberty, Tennessee when long-time contributor Andrew Smith (who wrote under the name Andy Sunfrog) took over the main editorial duties of the magazine, although long-time Detroit staffers like Peter Werbe remained involved.

== See also ==
- List of underground newspapers of the 1960s counterculture
