= Thom Hartmann =

American political commentator (born 1951)

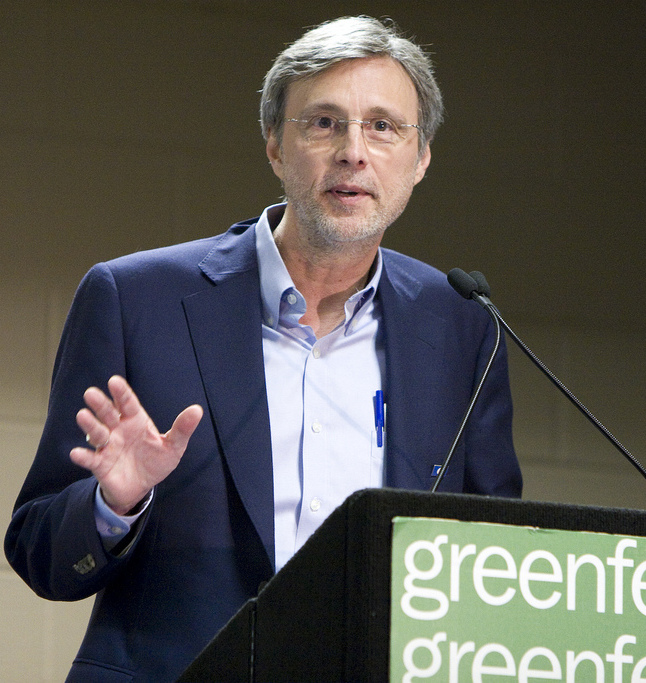
- Hartmann speaks at the 2010 Chicago Green Fest
- Born: Thomas Carl Hartmann; May 7, 1951 (age 75); Grand Rapids, Michigan, U.S.
- Education: Michigan State University
- Occupations: Radio/TV host; political commentator; author; entrepreneur
- Notable credits: The Thom Hartmann Program (2003–present); The Big Picture (2010–2017)
- Website: thomhartmann.com

Thomas Carl Hartmann (born May 7, 1951) is an American radio personality, author, businessman, and progressive political commentator. Hartmann has been hosting a nationally syndicated radio show, The Thom Hartmann Program, since 2003 and hosted a nightly television show, The Big Picture, between 2010 and 2017.

== Early life ==
Hartmann was born in Grand Rapids, Michigan, one of four children of Jean and Carl Thomas Hartmann. His paternal grandparents were from Norway, and his maternal ancestry includes Welsh and English forebears. He lived in Detroit at age two, and later grew up in Lansing, Michigan. Interested in politics from a young age, he was raised in a conservative, right-wing, Midwestern household. He campaigned with his staunchly Republican father for Barry Goldwater during the 1964 presidential election, when he was thirteen. Hartmann was expelled from high school during tenth grade for starting a newspaper that protested against the Vietnam War. He later earned a GED.

Hartmann enrolled at Lansing Community College and transferred to Michigan State University, majoring in electrical engineering. In 1968, Hartmann opened his first business, a repair shop named "Electronics Joint," located next to Michigan State University, and became a part-time disc jockey at local country music station WITL-FM. With Students for a Democratic Society (SDS), Hartmann protested against the Vietnam War. Hartmann had been interested in consciousness and spirituality since childhood, and by 1969 his interest evolved from a hippie subculture to Christian mysticism. During that year, he met the head of the Coptic Fellowship, Kurt Stanley, and Hamid Bey, an Egyptian Coptic priest who founded the Coptic Fellowship in the U.S. In 1971 Hartmann was ordained as a minister with Coptic Fellowship International. He has since been a keynote speaker at Coptic conferences nationally. In 1973, Hartmann returned to Detroit to work as an engineer with RCA.

== Business career ==
Hartmann began his business career in the early 1970s while in his 20s, co-founding the Woodley Herber Co., which sold herbal products, potpourris and teas, and operated until 1978. During this time, Hartmann obtained degrees in herbology and homeopathic medicine. Hartmann moved to New Hampshire to start the New England Salem Children's Village, which currently operates in Rumney, New Hampshire. He was its executive director for five years and served on the board of directors for more than 25 years. The childcare's model was based on the German Salem International organization. Through his affiliation with that group, he helped start international relief programs.

Hartmann founded International Wholesale Travel and its retail subsidiary Sprayberry Travel in Atlanta in 1983, a business which in the intervening years generated over $250 million in revenue. According to their website, Sprayberry Travel was lauded by the Wall Street Journal in 1984 as an early adopter of frequent travel programs, analogous to airline-industry frequent-flyer programs. He sold his share in the business in 1986, and retired with his family to Germany to work with the international relief organization Salem International. In the late 1970s, he was a trainer in advertising and marketing for American Marketing Centers (now defunct), and in 1987, after returning from Germany, founded the Atlanta advertising agency Chandler, MacDonald, Stout, Schneiderman & Poe, Inc., doing business as the Newsletter Factory. He sold his interest in that company in 1996, and again retired to Vermont.

== Broadcasting career ==
=== Talk radio career ===
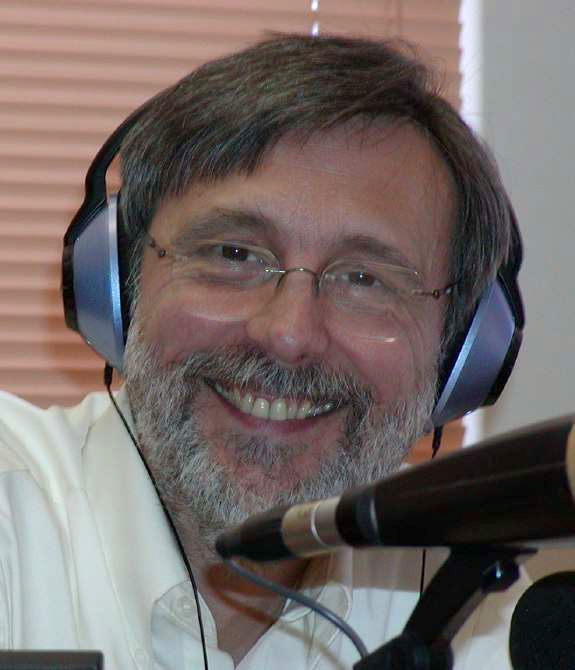
Hartmann doing his radio show, The Thom Hartmann Program, in 2004 at Santa Fe, New Mexico

Having worked as a DJ and news director at Lansing radio stations from 1968 to 1978, Hartmann started a radio show in February 2003 on a local station in Vermont; a month later it was picked up on the I.E. America Radio Network and on Sirius Satellite Radio. In 2005, he moved from Vermont to Oregon and, in addition to continuing his national show, also co-hosted a local talk show in Portland, Oregon (with Carl Wolfson, the late Heidi Tauber, and later Christine Alexander) on KPOJ. The station, initially an affiliate of Air America Radio, carried the program until 2007 when the station took on a sports talk format.

Hartmann's national program, on the air since 2003 and now airing from noon to 3 p.m., was chosen by Air America to replace Al Franken on most Air America affiliates in 2007. Since 2008, Talkers Magazine has rated Hartmann the most popular liberal talk show host in America, ranking as No. 8 among all talk-show hosts in 2026. According to his then-syndicator Dial Global, more people listened to Hartmann's show on more stations than any other progressive talk show in America. The Thom Hartmann Program is estimated by industry magazine Talkers to have 7 million unique listeners per week.

As of March 2026, the show was carried on 80 terrestrial radio stations in 37 states, as well as on SiriusXM Progress channel 127. A community radio station in Africa, Radio Builsa in Ghana, also broadcasts the show. Various local cable TV stations simulcast the program. In addition to Westwood One, the show is now also offered via Pacifica Audioport to non-profit stations in a non-profit-compliant format and is simulcast on Dish Network channel 9415 and DirecTV channel 348 via Free Speech TV. The program also airs in London, England.

Many guests appear on the show expressing a variety of points of view on diverse social and political topics. Some guests proffer progressive views similar to Hartmann's, but more than half are conservatives, libertarians, or Ayn Rand Institute members who espouse opposing views. Due to his eagerness to invite people who disagree with him, vigorous discussion and debate between the host and guests usually ensues; "My goal in my conversations with conservatives is not to create a spectacle, and not to win the argument, not to prove that I'm the smartest guy in the room or that I'm a tough warrior and I can smack down people." For many years, Sen. Bernie Sanders (I-VT) appeared every Friday for the "Brunch with Bernie" segment. Other regular phone-in guests include Reps. Mark Pocan (Mid-day with Mark) and Ro Khanna, both members of the Congressional Progressive Caucus. Ellen Ratner of the Talk Radio News Service provides Washington commentary daily. Victoria Jones, who is the White House correspondent for Talk Radio News Service, appears occasionally, as does Ravi Batra, an economics professor at SMU.

Like most talk radio shows, The Thom Hartmann Program takes calls from listeners. When callers asked Hartmann how he was, he used to reply, "I'm great, but I'll get better." After a time, some callers would regularly try to elicit this response, so he's stopped replying this way routinely. Hartmann ends each show with the phrase, "Activism begins with you; democracy begins with you. Get out there; get active! Tag, you're it!"

Michael Harrison, publisher of radio industry trade magazine Talkers, offered this appraisal of Hartmann:

He's entertaining, he's informative, he's an original thinker, he's an author, and he's an original source. In other words, he's not a B-level talking-points host that so many on both the left and the right are.... He's the kind of a host that other people can get their talking points from.

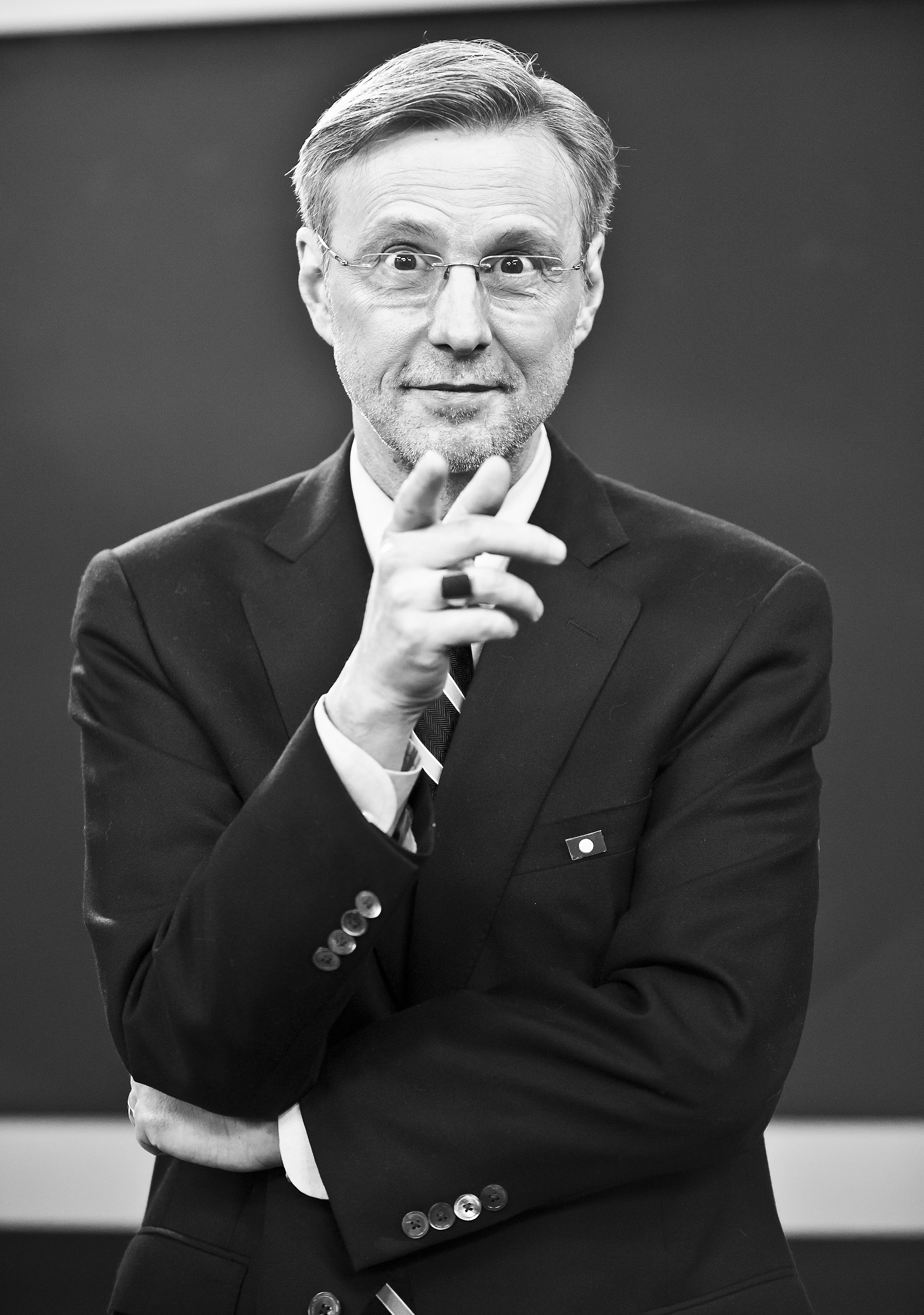
Hartmann on the set of his television program The Big Picture

=== TV program ===
Hartmann hosted a one-hour daily TV show at 7 p.m. ET Monday to Friday, The Big Picture with Thom Hartmann, which was editorially directed by his wife and was broadcast from the Washington, D.C., studios of the RT America news network. The show featured many conservative guests who routinely sparred with Hartmann. Hartmann co-produced the program with RT, who provided studio and carriage, while Hartmann retained full editorial control of his programming. The RT network aired the program via Dish Network, DirecTV, and on selected local-origination and public-access television cable TV channels globally. After hosting the program for seven years, Hartmann announced his departure as host on September 29, 2017.

== Other areas of notability ==
Hartmann has published more than twenty books on diverse topics. The title with the most critical acclaim is The Last Hours of Ancient Sunlight. In 1999, he was invited by the Dalai Lama to spend a week in Dharamsala after the Dalai Lama read the book. Hartmann won the Project Censored Award in 2004 for Unequal Protection. As a result of a book on spirituality, The Prophet's Way, he was invited in 1998 to meet Pope John Paul II.

He also publishes The Hartmann Report, a daily progressive newsletter.

Hartmann is a practitioner of the pseudo-scientific Neuro-Linguistic Programming, having been trained by Richard Bandler. Hartmann popularized some of NLP's concepts in Cracking the Code (2007), arguing Newt Gingrich and Frank Luntz made use of them in the 1980s and 1990s for Republican Party causes, while advocating using them to advance liberalism. His book Healing ADD also utilises NLP techniques. Co-authored with Lamar Waldron, Hartmann's Ultimate Sacrifice (2005) echoes the conspiracy theory that the Mafia ordered the assassination of John F. Kennedy and that Lee Harvey Oswald was a CIA agent.

Hartmann was one of several contributors to Air America, the Playbook, a collection of essays, transcripts, and interviews by liberal radio personalities. It was published in 2006 and was on The New York Times Best Seller List for October 8, 2006.

Leonardo DiCaprio made a web movie titled Before The Flood, inspired by The Last Hours of Ancient Sunlight. Hartmann appears in DiCaprio's 2007 documentary The 11th Hour, as well as the feature documentary film Dalai Lama Renaissance (with Harrison Ford), and Crude Impact. In 2010, Warner Brothers and Leonardo DiCaprio announced they are making a motion picture based on the book Legacy of Secrecy, authored by Lamar Waldron and Hartmann. Hartmann also narrated the 2011 documentary film Heist: Who Stole the American Dream?

In September 2013, Hartmann was granted an honorary doctorate of humane letters from Goddard College in Port Townsend, Washington. According to Pres. Barbara Vacarr, "Thom's work as a journalist, author and community activist is a living example of the very mission of Goddard College, and what our students are committed to: advancing cultures of rigorous inquiry, collaboration and lifelong learning, where individuals take imaginative and responsible action."

Hartmann served on the board of Voqal, a collaboration of EBS licensees working to advance social equity.

== Political views ==
Hartmann has progressive politics, describing himself as part of the radical middle. His books include Unequal Protection: The Rise of Corporate Dominance and the Theft of Human Rights, in which he argues that the 1886 U.S. Supreme Court decision in Santa Clara County v. Southern Pacific Railroad Company (118 U.S. 394) did not actually grant corporate personhood, and that this doctrine derives from a mistaken interpretation of a Supreme Court clerk's notes. Hartmann considers this a clear contradiction of the intent of the U.S. Founding Fathers. He has also written on the separation of church and state, drawing upon The Federalist Papers to argue that the Founding Fathers warned against the notion of the United States being a Christian nation. He contends that the 2000 and 2004 American elections were stolen through electronic tampering, denial of the voting franchise by rigged voting lists, and limiting availability of voting machines in selected precincts. He also accused the Bush administration of eroding democracy and individual freedoms.

Hartmann is a vocal critic of the effects of neoliberal globalization on the U.S. economy, claiming that economic policies enacted during and since the presidency of Ronald Reagan have led, in large part, to many American industrial enterprises' being acquired by multinational firms based in overseas countries, leading in many cases to manufacturing jobs—once considered a major foundation of the U.S. economy—being relocated to countries in Asia and other areas where the costs of labor are lower than in the U.S. and the concurrent reversal of the United States' traditional role of a leading exporter of finished manufactured goods to that of a primary importer of finished manufactured goods (exemplified by massive trade deficits with countries such as China). Hartmann argues that this phenomenon is leading to the erosion of the American middle class, whose survival Hartmann deems critical to the survival of American democracy. This argument is expressed in Hartmann's 2006 book, Screwed: The Undeclared War Against the Middle Class and What We Can Do About It. One of the book's main arguments is that media deregulation leads to corporate media's shifting the American consensus towards the acceptance of privatization and massive corporate profits—which causes the shrinking of the middle class.

In a 2013 interview with Politico, Hartmann described his political philosophy as democratic socialism:

I've lived in Europe. I think that the countries that call themselves democratic socialist—Germany, France, Norway, Sweden, Denmark, Finland—have the most functional political and economic system. So, somebody says, what's your political philosophy? I'd say Democratic socialism. But boy, the crap you take when you say “socialist,” because people don't understand it. They think I'm talking about Soviet-style socialism, which I'm not.

== Personal life ==
Hartmann has three children with his wife Louise. Hartmann has been a vegetarian since he was a teenager.

== Attention-deficit hyperactivity disorder ==
Hartmann has written about attention-deficit hyperactivity disorder (ADHD) and adult attention-deficit disorder (AADD), and has proposed (in 1978, published in 1992) the hunter vs. farmer hypothesis, suggesting that ADHD is an expected evolutionary adaptation to hunting lifestyles where individuals have the ability to rapidly shift focus and external attention, while holding multiple trains of thought. This ability, Hartmann theorizes, causes difficulties for those who live and work in cultures in which "farming"—planned, predictable, organized, repetitive behaviors—is typical. His first book on the disorder, Attention Deficit Disorder: a Different Perception was described by Scientific American as "innovative and fresh". Hartmann has established specialized schools for children with ADHD, such as the Hunter School in Rumney, New Hampshire, which he co-founded with his wife Louise.

He also operated the "ADD Forum" and "DeskTop Publishing Forum", along with several others, on CompuServe.

== Bibliography ==
- 1992 (first edition): ADD: A Different Perception. Underwood Books. 1997. ISBN 1-887424-14-8.
- 1993: The Best of the Desktop Publishing Forum on CompuServe. Peachpit Press. 1993. ISBN 1-56609-064-4.
- 1994: ADHD Secrets of Success: Coaching Yourself to Fulfillment in the Business World. Select Books. 2002. ISBN 1-59079-017-0.
- 1994: Focus Your Energy: Hunting for Success in Business. Pocket Books. 1994. ISBN 0-671-51689-2.
- 1995: ADD Success Stories. Underwood Books. 1995. ISBN 1-887424-03-2.
- 1996: Beyond ADD. Underwood Books. 1996. ISBN 1-887424-12-1.
- 1996: Think Fast!. Underwood Books. 1996. ISBN 1-887424-08-3. by Thom Hartmann and Jane Bowman, with Susan Burgess
- 1997 (2004 revised ed.): Last Hours of Ancient Sunlight. Three Rivers Press. 2004. ISBN 1-4000-5157-6.
- 1998 (2004 revised ed.): The Prophet's Way: A Guide to Living in the Now. Park Street Press. June 17, 2004. ISBN 0-89281-198-6.
- 1998: Healing ADD. Underwood Books. 1998. ISBN 1-887424-37-7.
- 2000: Thom Hartmann's Complete Guide to ADHD: Help for Your Family at Home, School and Work. Underwood Books. 2000. ISBN 1-887424-52-0.
- 2000: The Greatest Spiritual Secret of the Century. Hampton Roads. 2000. ISBN 1-57174-166-6.
- 2003: The Edison Gene. Park Street Press. 2003. ISBN 0-89281-128-5.
- 2004: What Would Jefferson Do?. Harmony Books. 2004. ISBN 1-4000-5208-4.
- 2004: We the People: A Call to Take Back America. Coreway Media, Inc. 2004. ISBN 1-882109-38-4.
- 2004 (revised ed.): Unequal Protection. Rodale Books. April 24, 2004. ISBN 1-57954-955-1.
- 2005: Ultimate Sacrifice: John and Robert Kennedy, the Plan for a Coup in Cuba, and the Murder of JFK. Carroll & Graf. 2005. ISBN 0-7867-1441-7. by Lamar Waldron, with Thom Hartmann
- 2006: Screwed: The Undeclared War Against The Middle Class and What We Can Do About It. Berrett-Koehler. 2006. ISBN 1-57675-414-6.
- 2006: Walking Your Blues Away: Practical Bilateral Therapies for Healing the Mind and Optimizing Emotional Well-Being. Park Street Press. October 19, 2006. ISBN 1-59477-144-8.
- 2007: Cracking The Code: How to Win Hearts, Change Minds, and Restore America's Original Vision. Berrett-Koehler. 2007. ISBN 978-1-57675-458-0.
- 2008: Legacy of Secrecy: The Long Shadow of the JFK Assassination (by Lamar Waldron with Thom Hartmann). Counterpoint. 2009. ISBN 978-1-58243-535-0.
- 2009: Threshold: The Crisis of Western Culture. Viking. 2009. ISBN 978-0-670-02091-1.
- 2010 (second edition): Unequal Protection: How Corporations Became "People" – And How You Can Fight Back. Berrett-Koehler. 2010. ISBN 978-1-60509-559-2.
- 2011: Rebooting the American Dream: 11 Ways to Rebuild Our Country. Berrett-Koehler. 2010. ISBN 978-1-60509-706-0.
- 2013: The Crash of 2016: The Plot to Destroy America—and What We Can Do to Stop It.
- 2013: The Last Hours of Humanity: Warming the World to Extinction. Waterfront Digital Press. ISBN 978-1-939116-47-5.
- 2019: The Hidden History of Guns and the Second Amendment Penguin Random House ISBN 9781523085996
- 2019: Hartmann, Thom (2019). The Hidden History of the Supreme Court and the Betrayal of America. National Geographic Books. ISBN 9781523085941.
- 2020: The Hidden History of the War on Voting: Who Stole Your Vote and How to Get It Back Berrett-Koehler Publishers ISBN 9781523087785
- 2020: Hartmann, Thom (2020). The Hidden History of Monopolies: How Big Business Destroyed the American Dream. Berrett-Koehler Publishers. ISBN 978-1523087730.
- 2021: Hartmann, Thom (2021). Hidden History of American Oligarchy: Reclaiming Our Democracy from the ruling class. Berrett-Koehler Publishers. ISBN 978-1523091584.
- 2021: Hartmann, Thom (2021). Hidden History of American Healthcare : Why Sickness Bankrupts You and Makes Others Insanely Rich. Berrett-Koehler Publishers. ISBN 978-1523091638.
- 2022: Hartmann, Thom (2022). The Hidden History of Big Brother in America : How the Death of Privacy and the Rise of Surveillance Threaten Us and Our Democracy. Berrett-Koehler Publishers. ISBN 978-1523001026.
- 2022: Hartmann, Thom (2022). The Hidden History of Neoliberalism : How Reaganism Gutted America and How to Restore Its Greatness. Berrett-Koehler Publishers. ISBN 978-1523002320.
- 2023: Hartmann, Thom (2023). The Hidden History of American Democracy : Rediscovering Humanity's Ancient Way of Living. Berrett-Koehler Publishers. ISBN 978-1523004386.
- 2024: Hartmann, Thom (2024). The Hidden History of the American Dream : The Demise of the Middle Class—and How to Rescue Our Future. Berrett-Koehler Publishers. ISBN 978-1523007288.
- 2025: The Last American President : A Broken Man, a Corrupt Party, and a World on the Brink.
- 2026: Who Killed the American Dream?: The Greatest Political Crime Ever Told. Berrett-Koehler Publishers.
