= WQRZ-LP =

Community radio station in Bay St. Louis, Mississippi

- Bay Saint Louis, Mississippi; United States
- Broadcast area: Bay St. Louis, Mississippi
- Frequency: 103.5 MHz

Programming
- Format: Variety / Public Radio

Ownership
- Owner: Hancock County Amateur Radio Association, Inc.

History
- Call sign meaning: Amateur radio Q Code: "Who is calling me?"

Technical information
- Licensing authority: FCC
- Facility ID: 126435
- Class: L1
- ERP: 100 watts
- HAAT: 27.8 meters (91 ft)
- Transmitter coordinates: 30°18′40″N 89°24′14″W
- Repeater: WQRG 96.3 Diamondhead

Links
- Public license information: LMS
- Website: WQRZ Community Radio

WQRZ-LP (103.5 FM) is non-commercial low-power FM community radio station licensed to Bay Saint Louis, Mississippi, United States. The station is currently owned by the Hancock County Amateur Radio Association.

== History ==
On August 14, 2001 Brice Phillips (KB5MPW), President of the Hancock County Amateur Radio Association, was granted a construction permit to build the first solar powered LPFM Broadcast Station, which combined Broadcasting with Amateur radio. WQRZ-LP signed on the air January 29, 2003.

=== Hurricane Katrina ===
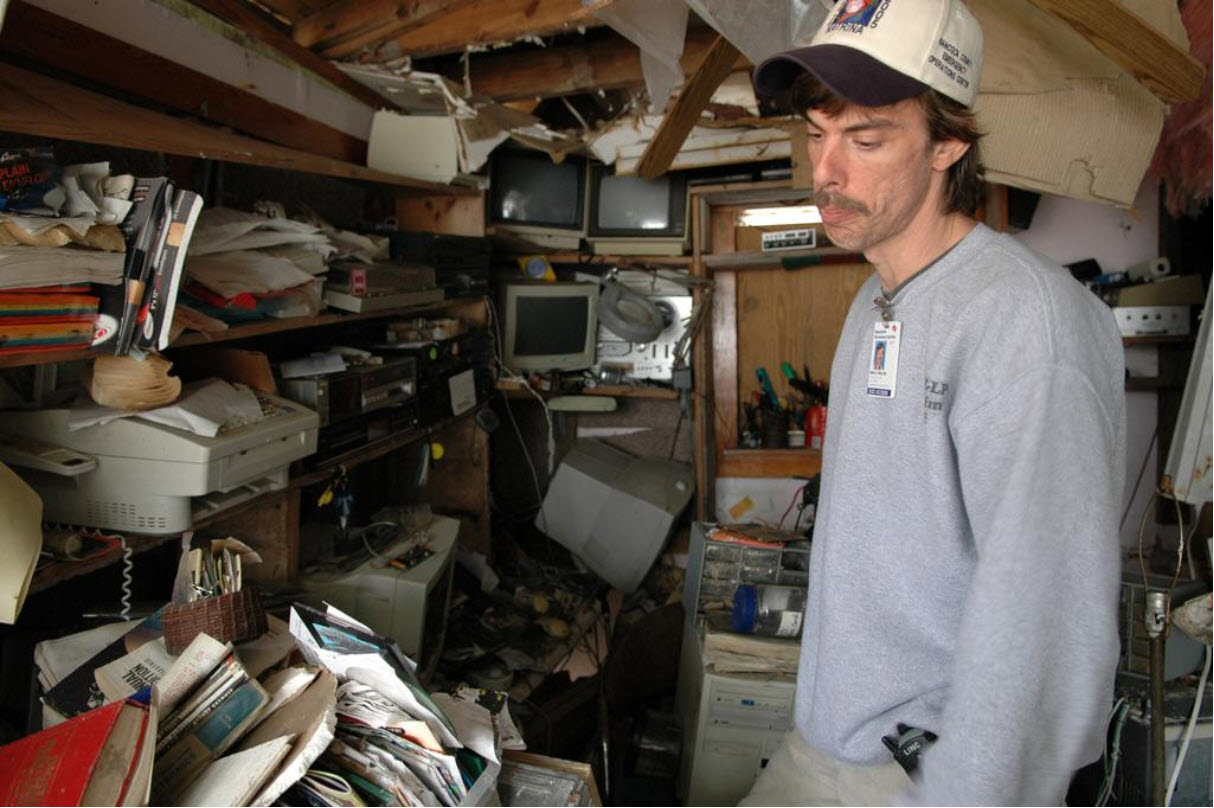
Brice Phillips of WQRZ-LP in his home studio in the wake of Hurricane Katrina, February 2006 (FEMA photograph).

On August 27, 2005 Brice Phillips moved WQRZ-LP to the Hancock County Emergency Operations Center (EOC) in advance of Hurricane Katrina. WQRZ-LP was one of the 4 out of 41 Broadcast Stations that survived Katrina, the only station at Ground Zero. After Katrina the Federal Communications Commission allowed WQRZ to increase their power from 100 watts to 4000 watts under special temporary authority, another first in history. The Federal Emergency Management Agency (FEMA) distributed 3,500 FM radios so survivors could tune into WQRZ-LP to listen to information directly from the EOC.

WQRZ-LP was the first Broadcast Radio First Responder which earned American Radio Relay League Member Brice Philips the Small Business Administration's Phoenix Award, for "Outstanding Contributions to Disaster Recovery by a Volunteer". In 2007, WQRZ-LP became the host to the first progressive radio show to air regularly on a terrestrial station in Mississippi, which was “Unreported News Radio Show”, hosted by Herbert "Sarge" Phelps.

== The future ==
WQRZ-LP operated out of the Hancock County EOC from August 27, 2005 until November 30, 2007. The future is unclear for WQRZ as they have not received any public assistance from FEMA. WQRZ-LP remains the only local 24-hour Emergency Alert System station in Hancock County.

== See also ==
- List of community radio stations in the United States
