= Sheldon Drobny =

American accountant (1945–2020)

Sheldon Drobny (1945 – January 24, 2020) was an American accountant and investor, best known for forming the company that later became Air America Radio.

== Career ==
Drobny was Chairman Emeritus of Paradigm Group II, LLC, an investment firm that serves as managing partner of Paradigm Millennium Fund, LP, which entities together are a principal and largest shareholder of the Company.

Drobny was also a director of numerous portfolio companies of Paradigm Group II, LLC and was formerly a partner in the firm of Adler Drobny Fischer, LLC, Certified Public Accountants and Consultants. Drobny was a member of the NASD and the American Institute of Certified Public Accountants, the Illinois C.P.A Society and several other professional associations. Drobny was also a former IRS agent. He held a BS degree in Accounting from Roosevelt University, 1967.

== Air America Radio ==
Drobny began to pursue the start of a liberal radio network sometime in late 2002 or early 2003. He and his wife, Anita, sold the forerunner of Air America Radio to a group headed by Evan Montvel Cohen.

In mid-2003, the Drobnys met Cohen through a meeting arranged by David Goodfriend, a former Clinton aide and Beloit College classmate of Cohen. Cohen and his partner purchased the rights to start up the new radio network. After Cohen and his partners at Progress Media, LLC ran out of operating capital, Drobny and other investors moved in through Piquant LLC and purchased the assets of the radio network.

In 2006, after failing to reacquire control of Air America Radio, Sheldon and Anita Drobny founded Nova M Radio as a competitor to Air America Radio in producing and syndicating progressive talk radio programs.

== Fourth Estate Society ==
Drobny was also involved in the Fourth Estate Society, which has the stated goal of revitalizing the tradition of independent journalism in the United States.

== Death ==
Drobny died on January 24, 2020, of pancreatic cancer at his home in Highland Park, Illinois. He was 74 years old.
