= SiriusXM Progress =

Progressive satellite talk radio channel

- Broadcast area: United States; Canada
- Frequency: SiriusXM Radio 127

Programming
- Format: Progressive talk radio
- Affiliations: Associated Press

Ownership
- Owner: SiriusXM Radio

History
- First air date: February 3, 2003

Technical information
- Class: Satellite radio station

Links
- Website: www.siriusxm.com/siriusxmprogress

SiriusXM Progress is a channel on the SiriusXM Radio service (channel 127) broadcasting a progressive talk radio format.

SiriusXM Progress was formed from two separate services. Sirius was the first to launch a left-leaning channel, with Sirius Left debuting in February 2003. XM followed with America Left on March 31, 2004, which was known as Air America Radio from 2005 to 2008 under a programming partnership with the liberal talk network. Though Sirius and XM merged in 2008, each service continued broadcasting its own lineup, with the other available to internet subscribers. America Left and Sirius Left merged as SiriusXM Left in 2011 and adopted its present name in 2013.

== Sirius: Sirius Left ==
Of the two satellite radio services in the United States, Sirius Satellite Radio was the first to introduce a channel specifically for left-oriented progressive talk. Its Sirius Left began broadcasting February 3, 2003, as part of a major overhaul of programming that saw the creation of left- and right-specific talk channels. Hosts included Peter Werbe, David Horowitz, and John McMullen. Air America Radio programming was added to the lineup in 2004.

== XM: America Left and Air America Radio ==
On March 31, 2004, XM Satellite Radio debuted America Left as part of a non-exclusive deal with Air America Radio. The lineup of Air America programs carried included Al Franken, Janeane Garofalo, Chuck D, and Robert F. Kennedy Jr.

On April 11, 2005, XM and Air America announced that XM would become the exclusive satellite radio provider of the network, excluding Air America Syndication, beginning in May 2005. This forced Sirius to rid itself of all Air America Radio network programming. Though America Left was renamed to Air America Radio, non-AAR hosts Ed Schultz and Alan Colmes remained on the channel. No lineup changes were made until September 2005, when Ed Schultz was moved over to Clear Channel's advice talker, Ask! on 165. This allowed Randi Rhodes to broadcast her entire show every afternoon. At the end of the year, Alan Colmes also made the move to the new Fox News Talk, a channel owned and operated by Fox News Radio. For the first time, Air America Radio on XM was now 100% Air America content on weekdays. A Best of Stephanie Miller segment was carried on Sunday mornings.

There were lineup changes occurring across the Air America Network that were reflected onto XM 167, such as Mike Malloy and Janeane Garofalo's departures, the end of Morning Sedition, and the hiring of The Young Turks. Some questioned the financial state of the network and whether or not XM was wise in paying for the exclusive rights to satellite broadcasting. More information on Air America's company state can be found in its article, including the company's bankruptcy and sale.

In 2007, XM announced that Ed Schultz, who was airing on Extreme XM on delay and truncated to two separate hours, was going to be returning to XM 167 to fill the timeslot being vacated by Al Franken. This allowed Schultz to return to the full three hours in a live timeslot. Some were not happy about this move as it prevented Thom Hartmann from taking the slot on the channel, prompting midday host Sam Seder to ask his listeners to call XM to complain. Schultz responded on air the next day claiming that "Air America sucks, their programs suck, they give liberals a bad name," and recommended that XM play other Jones radio hosts Stephanie Miller and Bill Press on channel 167. Schultz kept the timeslot, and Hartmann's show was eventually added to the channel's schedule. Bill Press and Stephanie Miller would be added later in 2008.

In addition to Schultz, XM exclusive shows The Agenda and Left Jab were added to XM 167 weekends. These moves have led listeners to question XM's confidence in the Air America Radio network, as ex-AAR host and current Nova M Radio host Mike Malloy returned to the channel in July, weeknights at 9 pm eastern. With this rescheduling, XM moved Thom Hartmann from midnight to 6:00 pm eastern and the Air Americans, which previously aired in that time to midnight.

Despite being on a channel with the "Air America Radio" label, Schultz stated on February 13, 2007, that Air America "sucks" and he doesn't want people who listen to AAR listening to him because he is "better than they are." These comment were in response to remarks by AAR host Sam Seder, who asked his listeners to call XM and request Thom Hartmann instead of Schultz. Seder's reasoning for his action is that he believes AAR hosts should be on the 'Air America Radio' channel. Hartmann was added to the channel beginning March 5, 2007, on a tape-delay basis at Midnight ET, and has since moved to an earlier time slot on the channel.

In April 2007, XM Radio Canada added the channel to its lineup unannounced, making Air America programs available in Canada. The AAR network announced that month that Sam Seder would become a Sunday host only and scheduled WOR talker Lionel to replace him. Eco-Talk was also dropped by the network in favor of a four-hour Mark Riley program, and Jon Elliot doing midnights.

=== AAR loses more time as cuts are made ===
Towards the end of 2007, the Young Turks were cut from the Air America lineup, claiming it was a mutual understanding. The trio plans a return through internet radio. In the meantime, XM Radio added its second Jones Radio personality, Bill Press, to the morning drive timeslot.

Although The Rachel Maddow Show expanded from two to three hours on March 10, 2008, XM 167 does not broadcast the third hour, instead playing a taped Thom Hartmann program. This became moot on September 8, 2008, when The Rachel Maddow Show returned to a two-hour format.

In April 2008, Randi Rhodes performed at an event in San Francisco sponsored by local affiliate KKGN, which included crude remarks made at Hillary Clinton as part of a comedy routine. This resulted in Air America suspending Rhodes from the network. She claimed that the network was in breach of her contract, and ended up resigning from Air America. Rhodes debuted a new program syndicated by Nova FM Radio, which was returned to the XM AAR lineup on May 5. on Air America Radio channel 167. With this addition, the channel known as "Air America Radio" now only carried 13 hours of AAR programming per day, with 2 hours being distribution only, and only 7 of those hours in the daypart timeslots.

On June 18, 2008, XM announced that Air America Radio would be changing its name back to America Left, beginning July 14. The channel kept most of its lineup, however, Lionel was replaced by Jones Radio's Stephanie Miller. In addition, The Young Turks returned to the channel.

In 2008, XM merged with Sirius Satellite Radio, whose own left-oriented talk station Sirius Left predated XM's, having launched in January 2003.

After the SiriusXM merger, the co-owned SIRIUS Left did not join the channel merger on November 12 2008. Since February 2009, however, several SIRIUS Left shows have joined the America Left lineup, and all remaining Air America Media shows have been dropped. Nevertheless, the majority of America Left programming still consists of shows of former Air Americans: Mike Malloy, Thom Hartmann (twice a day), Bill Press, and the Young Turks. (Randi Rhodes' official site http://www.RandiRhodes.com has said America Left has carried her show live since just after her return to the air with Premiere Radio Networks.)

On January 21, 2010, Air America Media announced that it would file for liquidation under Chapter 7 of the Bankruptcy Code, and ceased all live broadcasting that same evening.

== SiriusXM Left/SiriusXM Progress (2011–) ==
On May 4, 2011, America Left (XM 167) and Sirius Left (Sirius 146) merged to become SiriusXM Left and aired on channel 127 on both services. On July 22, 2013, SiriusXM Left was renamed SiriusXM Progress. Along with the name change, several changes were made to the lineup. The Agenda with Ari Rabin Havt replaced Bill Press at 6:00-9:00 am EST, Michelangelo Signorile replaced Thom Hartmann at 3:00-6:00 pm EST and Make It Plain with Mark Thompson replaced Alex Bennett at 6:00-9:00 pm EST. At the same time, SiriusXM Progress Plus, an online station also available through a smartphone app continued to air both Press and Hartmann at their regular times, as well as the usual lineup, though the showtimes differed slightly from those on the main Progress channel.

On July 13, 2026, John Fugelsang's new show 'The John Fugelsang Show' debuted replacing Thom Hartmann's show time slot.

== Notable hosts ==
- Alan Colmes
- Chuck D
- Al Franken
- John Fugelsang
- Janeane Garofalo
- Thom Hartmann
- David Horowitz
- Robert F. Kennedy Jr.
- Lionel
- Rachel Maddow
- Zerlina Maxwell
- Stephanie Miller
- John McMullen
- Dean Obeidallah
- Bill Press
- Randi Rhodes
- Ed Schultz
- Michelangelo Signorile
- Peter Werbe
- The Young Turks
