= Peter Werbe =

Peter Alexander Werbe is an American anarchist journalist, radio personality and novelist. He has been a radical political activist in Detroit since the 1960s.

== Personal life and education ==
Werbe was born in Detroit on June 19, 1940. He married Marilyn Cohen on May 26, 1963. He attended Ferris State College in 1959, Michigan State University from 1960 to 1963, and Wayne State University from 1963 to 1964. He was a member of Students for a Democratic Society and an opponent of the military draft.

A native of Detroit, Werbe is a long time resident of Oak Park, Michigan.

== Fifth Estate ==
In 1968, Werbe became co-editor of the Fifth Estate working with founding editor Harvey Ovshinsky. Werbe has been affiliated with the publication ever since. Werbe "transformed the already left leaning publication into an outlet for anarchist ideas".

== Radio career ==
Werbe was a deejay for WCSX-FM, WWWW-FM and WABX-FM. He was the long-time host of a radio call in show called Nightcall on WRIF in Detroit, for 45 years. The show was described as "pointed and unsparing".

The Detroit News has described Werbe as "a staple in Detroit media for more than 50 years, having hosted “Nightcall” on WRIF-FM from 1971 to 2016 and having contributed countless articles to the counter-culture tabloid called the Fifth Estate".

== Author ==
In 2021, Werbe wrote a novel Summer on Fire about events in Detroit and Ann Arbor in 1967, including the 1967 Detroit riot that resulted in 43 deaths and widespread destruction. According to a reviewer writing for the Lansing State Journal, "Werbe doesn't sidestep any issues - his unusual, well-researched novel deals with riots, looting, racism, frustration, anger, despicable Michigan Army National Guard behavior and the deadly Algiers Motel incident." The reviewer concluded that the book "is a cool, thought-provoking literary journey providing uncommon, revealing insights into revolutionary and countercultural attitudes of the 1960s."

A reviewer for the Detroit Free Press wrote, "But at its heart, Werbe's novel is a time-travel trip that evokes what it was like to be part of the Fifth Estate underground newspaper, the iconic Detroit publication launched in 1965 that had an impact far beyond its counterculture reach."
