= Brian Beirne =

American disc jockey

Brian Beirne (born November 7, 1946, in San Mateo, California) is an American radio disc jockey who had a decades-long tenure at KRTH-FM aka K-EARTH 101 in Southern California. He lived in West Salem, Oregon starting in 1957, and graduated from South Salem High School in 1964.

He is known as "Mr. Rock N' Roll", which is his registered trademark, and is considered one of the foremost historians on rock music. Beirne's Los Angeles career lasted almost three decades, representing the longest continuous stint in FM radio history.

Beirne was the voice of K-EARTH 101 during the RKO days and reached legendary status as a top-rating midday personality in the Los Angeles market for 27 years - a record-setting achievement in FM radio. His radio career, spanning 40 years, also included stints in San Francisco, Chicago, Cleveland, and Sacramento, among others. On January 18, 1991, Beirne was honored with a star on the Hollywood Walk of Fame.

Beirne retired from KRTH-FM on December 15, 2004. He has continued to host and produce rock and roll shows around the country.
