= Mike Malloy =

American broadcaster and pundit

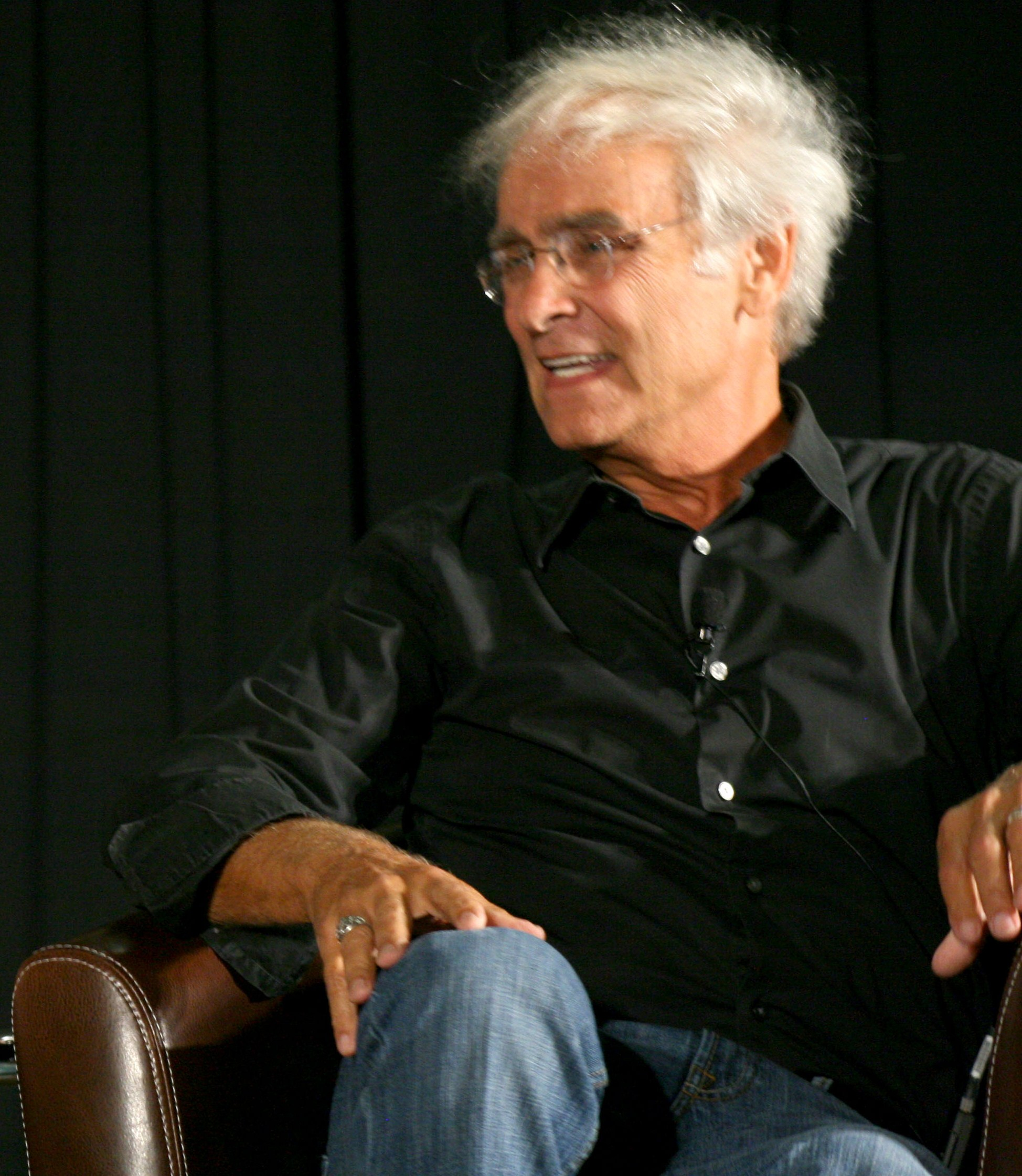
- Malloy speaks in Seattle in 2008.
- Born: Michael Dennis Malloy; July 1, 1942 (age 84); Toledo, Ohio, U.S.
- Other name: Mike
- Occupation: Radio personality
- Spouse: Kathy Bay (1997–2020)
- Children: 6
- Website: Mike Malloy's website

Michael Dennis Malloy (born July 1, 1942) is a progressive American radio broadcaster based in Atlanta. Previously his show has been carried by WSB (AM) Atlanta, WLS (AM) Chicago, the I.E. America Radio Network, the Air America Radio network, Nova M Radio and the On Second Thought network. He is now self-syndicated. Politically, he describes himself as "a traditional Liberal Democrat doing his part to return the Democratic Party to its Liberal roots."

== Early life and career ==
Malloy was born in Toledo, Ohio. His mother was a waitress, and his father was a construction cost analyst. He studied English and political science at North Carolina State University, the University of Toledo, Georgia State University, and Jacksonville University. In the late 1970s, Malloy relocated to Atlanta and became editor of the alternative weekly newspaper Creative Loafing and actor with the Southern Theater Conspiracy. From 1984 to 1987, he was a news writer with CNN, and he was a writer and producer for CNN International in 2000.

== Radio career ==
Malloy began his radio career in 1985 as an apprentice with Ludlow Porch of WCNN in Atlanta (not related to CNN). Malloy hosted an afternoon (12 p.m. to 2 p.m.) show on WSB in Atlanta from 1986 to 1988 and 1992 to March 24, 1995, until WSB replaced him with the syndicated program of Laura Schlessinger. Malloy's WSB program competed against conservative talk show The Rush Limbaugh Show on rival station WGST. On July 5, 1995, Malloy began a new show in the 12 p.m. to 3 p.m. daypart on WQXI as brokered programming. On October 2, 1996, Malloy began hosting a late-night show on WRFG, a non-commercial FM station in Atlanta known as Radio Free Georgia. During his career in Atlanta, Malloy contributed opinion articles and editorials to the Atlanta Journal-Constitution.

In 1997, Malloy began to host a show that aired from 10 p.m. to 1 a.m. on the Chicago station WLS. Malloy's WLS program was regularly among the top 25 late-night programs in Chicago. In 1999 and 2000, Talkers magazine ranked Malloy in its Heavy Hundred listing, and Malloy won an Achievement in Radio award for best overnight radio show in Chicago. Malloy's last WLS show was on March 24, 2000. WLS claims that he voluntarily left with mutual consent, but Chicago Tribune columnist Eric Zorn claimed that an executive at the station called Malloy "mean-spirited" in an e-mail.

His program was syndicated between October 2000 and February 2004 on I.E. America Radio Network. The Mike Malloy Show was aired during the 9PM-12AM (ET) timeslot from 2004 until August 2006 on Air America Radio. His time at I.E. America didn't last long. From August to October 2006, Malloy could be heard on the Head On Radio Network. The network rebroadcast Malloy programs from his i.e. America and Air America Radio programs nightly at 10:00 PM. The show was heard on Nova M Radio beginning on October 30, 2006. The show was then briefly heard on the On Second Thought network.

Mike Malloy is now self-syndicating his radio program. He is currently being heard in 13 markets across America. Direct listener support is enabled through the sale of podcast subscriptions via his website.

== Controversy ==
On May 4, 2011, Malloy made remarks regarding the killing of Osama bin Laden, stating:

All the death in Iraq was not caused by bin Laden. The death in Iraq was caused by George W. Bush. Five thousand Americans, tens of thousands permanently damaged and shot to pieces, a million Iraqis dead – that wasn't bin Laden. That was George Bush. So when does Seal Unit 6, or whatever it's called, drop in on George Bush? Bush was responsible for a lot more death, innocent death, than bin Laden.

The comment drew critical national attention.

== See also ==
- The Mike Malloy Show
