= Brad Will =

American activist (1970–2006)

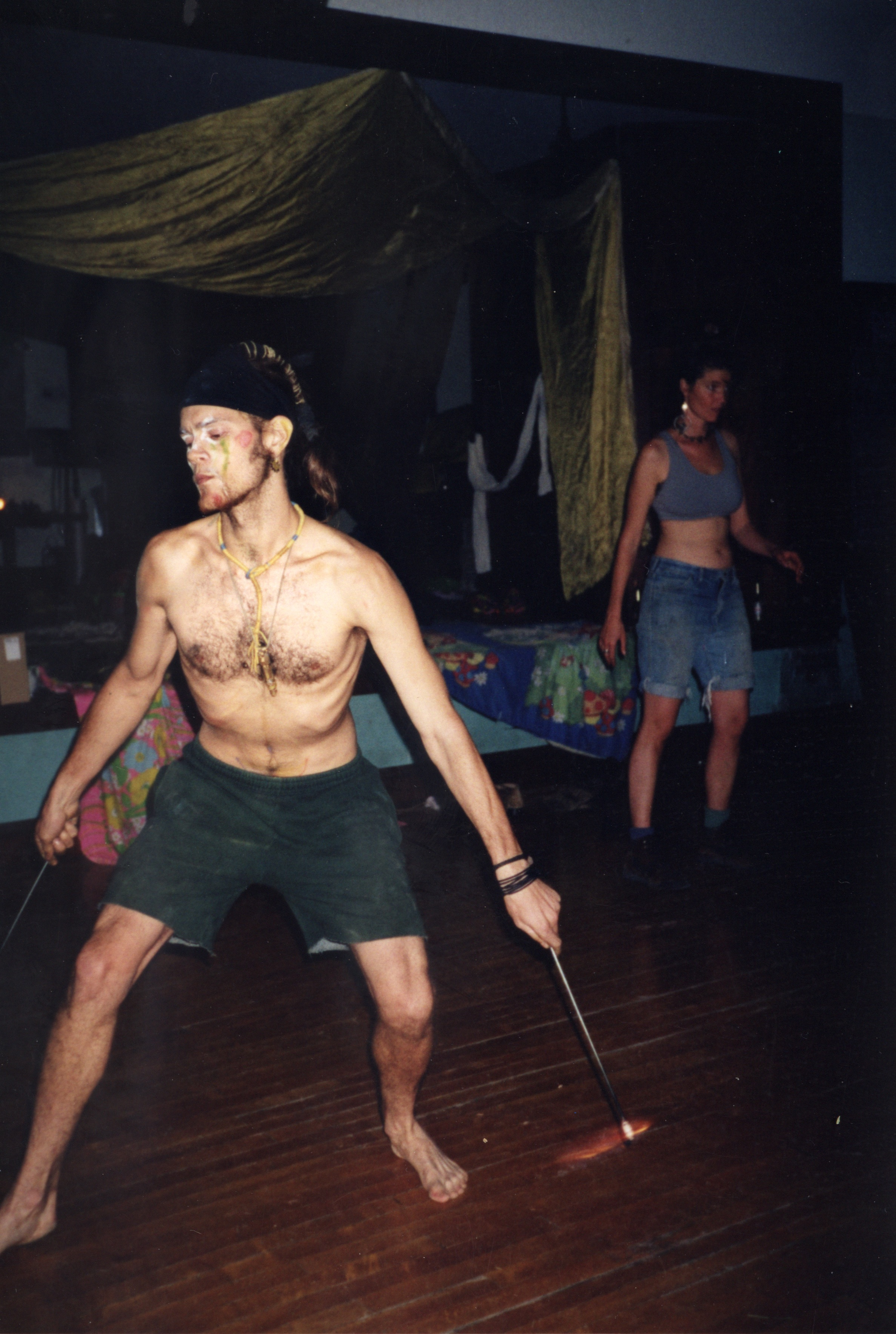
- Brad Will performing at Dreamtime Village in the 1990s.
- Born: Bradley Roland Will; June 14, 1970; Evanston, Illinois, U.S.
- Died: October 27, 2006 (aged 36); Oaxaca, Oax., Mexico
- Education: Allegheny College (B.A. in English)
- Occupations: Activist, videographer, journalist
- Notable credit: Indymedia

Bradley Roland Will (June 14, 1970 – October 27, 2006) was an American activist, videographer, and journalist. He was affiliated with Indymedia. On October 27, 2006, during a labor dispute in the Mexican city of Oaxaca, Will was shot twice, by government-aligned paramilitaries, resulting in his death.

== Early life ==
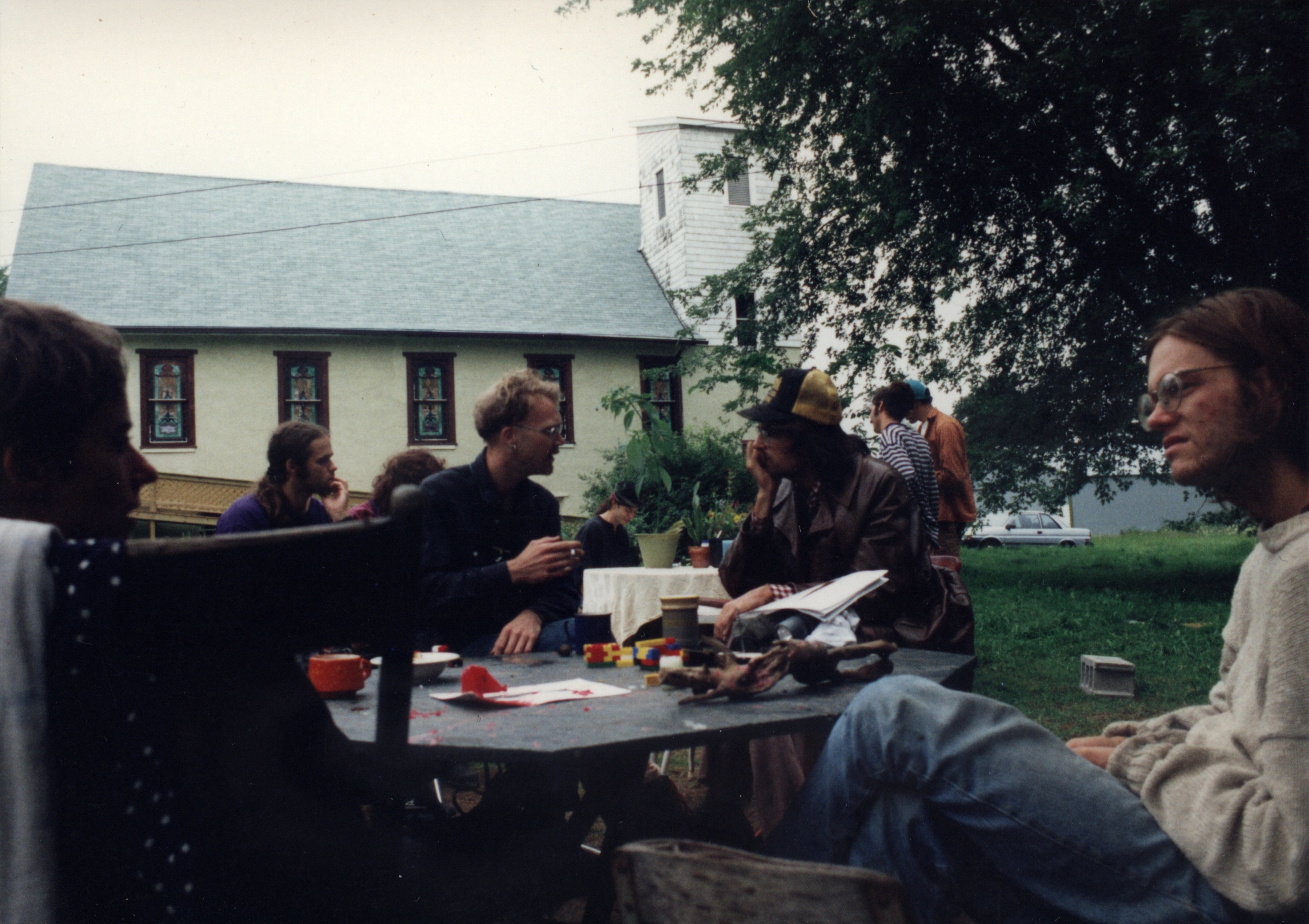
Brad Will (far right) at the Dreamtime Village, about 1993

Will was born in Evanston, Illinois, and raised in Kenilworth. He graduated from New Trier High School in 1988, then attended Allegheny College in Meadville, Pennsylvania, where he earned a B.A. in English.

Beginning in the summer of 1991, he was a regular attendee at the Jack Kerouac School of Disembodied Poetics, the summer writing program of Naropa University and was a teaching assistant to Peter Lamborn Wilson (a.k.a. Hakim Bey). In 1995, after spending time at Dreamtime Village in southwest Wisconsin, he moved to Manhattan where he squatted on the Lower East Side before moving to Williamsburg, Brooklyn.

== Activism ==
=== U.S. ===
At Naropa, Will participated in a satirical performance art piece designed to mock the Colorado socially conservative Christian community and protest a proposed amendment to the Colorado constitution which sought to limit gay rights. Will pretended to marry another man in a ceremony conducted by Peter Lamborn Wilson, a Universal Life Church-ordained minister. The mock ceremony included a procession of their wedding party in drag, parading in front of a Promise Keepers event in Boulder, Colorado.

While in New York City, Will became involved in the squatters movement of the Lower East Side and also became involved in what has become known as freeganism, an effort to live outside the mainstream economic grid by means that includes collecting and eating food discarded by stores and food manufacturers. He fought the removal of community gardens, including the Chico Mendez Mural Garden on the Lower East Side, named after Brazilian activist Chico Mendes. Will was an active participant in protests across the country, usually for various social justice and human rights causes, and was involved with environmental movements such as Earth First! and the Fall Creek Tree Village in the Willamette National Forest outside Eugene, Oregon.

Will gained some notoriety for his efforts to prevent New York City from demolishing a squat on Fifth Street on the Lower East Side. When construction crews arrived at the building to begin taking it down, he stood atop the roof waving his arms. His efforts stalled the demolition, but the city eventually leveled the building, which housed a café, a meeting place and a performance space. Will later talked about the building in a program produced by Paper Tiger Television called "ABC Survives, Fifth Street Buried Alive".

We were making a home out of a crumbling building. The interior of the building needed help, and we brought that building back to life. It was standing strong. And the only reason it was standing was because people were living in it. If we had let it go the way the city wanted it to go– they tore out the stairwell, they punched holes in the roof. The water– the rain was rotting that building from the inside out. We replaced the joists. We rebuilt the floors. We sheet rocked the walls and made the building alive. What did they do? They killed it. That building is over a hundred years old. It was standing strong.

Will was a proponent of anti-corporate media, and he hosted his own program on Steal This Radio, a Lower East Side-based pirate radio station.

In 1998, he and partner Hazel spoke at the Ecosaloon, a weekly activism forum held on Tuesday evenings at the Wetlands Preserve nightclub. Their presentation connected the struggle to defend the forests of the Pacific Northwest with the fight against the gentrification of Manhattan's Lower East Side. After helping to organize Buy Nothing Day and a Reclaim the Streets protest in Times Square, Will traveled to Seattle for the 1999 WTO protests, and was a longtime participant in Direct Action Network (DAN) and the Independent Media Center (IMC) of New York City. In August 2001 he joined participants for a roving exploration of usable food found in Tribeca dumpsters; they were accompanied by a TV crew from PBS's Life 360. In his later years, Will began recording documentary videos, releasing them on the internet through the Indymedia network of websites. During the summer of 2006, Will continued videotaping demonstrations, including a June 15 protest at the Mexican Consulate in response to a police incursion into a teacher's plantón (encampment). On June 29 he video-recorded and helped organize a protest against Victoria's Secret at the Manhattan Mall in response to the resources used to print the high volume of mail-order catalogs which the company mails out. He also filmed a street theater performance by the group A for Anarchy, organized in response to the release of the film V for Vendetta. At the time of his death, he was working on a documentary about folk punk music.

=== International ===
In 2000, while visiting the Czech Republic Will attended a protest in Prague against the International Monetary Fund Summit. He later traveled through South America while participating in anti-globalization. He reached Ecuador, Argentina, Chiapas and Brazil in that trip.

== Death ==
Traveling under a tourist visa, Will arrived in Oaxaca in early October 2006 in order to document and film the teachers' strike. On October 27, he was videotaping near a barricade erected by pro-strike protesters when he was shot twice. In the last few minutes of the video; Will filmed before being shot, voices speaking in Spanish are heard demanding that filming be stopped and cameras be turned off. In the final seconds of the video a voice in Spanish reprimands Will for not having turned off the camera. In the middle of this statement a gunshot is heard, there is a scream, the camera pans down to the ground and the video ends.

Will died while being carried from the area in search of medical help. Two others, Esteban Zurita López and teacher Emilio Alonso Fabián, were also killed. Several others were injured. 26 protesters were ultimately murdered during this mobilization. A truth commission later classified his death as an "extrajudicial execution".

During a news conference on October 29, 2006, Oaxaca mayor Manuel Martínez said that four men, all local public officials, were being detained in connection with the shooting. A participant in the teachers' strike was arrested in 2008 and accused of Will's murder; on appeal, he was cleared of the killing and released in 2010. In late May 2012, based on forensic evidence and witness interviews, a new suspect was arrested.

== Reaction ==
=== Federal Police mobilized ===
Later on the day of the shooting, the Oaxaca airport was closed to commercial flights as the Federal Police arrived to reestablish government control of the city. The army was also mobilized to provide intelligence support to the police, but not to engage directly with protesters. APPO representatives declared their intention to resist the government's armed response to the crisis. At the beginning of November, violent clashes continued between protesters and police. The government claimed that the Federal Police that entered Oaxaca were unarmed.

=== Demonstrations at Mexican consulates ===
On October 30, more than 200 protesters convened outside the Mexican consulate in New York City to deplore the killing of Will and others and to demand an end to the violence. The protest was organized by the grassroots group named in his honor, The Friends of Brad Will.

=== Committee to Protect Journalists ===
The Committee to Protect Journalists sent an open letter on October 30 to the Mexican attorney general calling on the Mexican government to launch an investigation into Will's death. The statement said that David Vega Vera, special independent prosecutor, had begun gathering information related to the case.

=== Commemoration and memorial ===
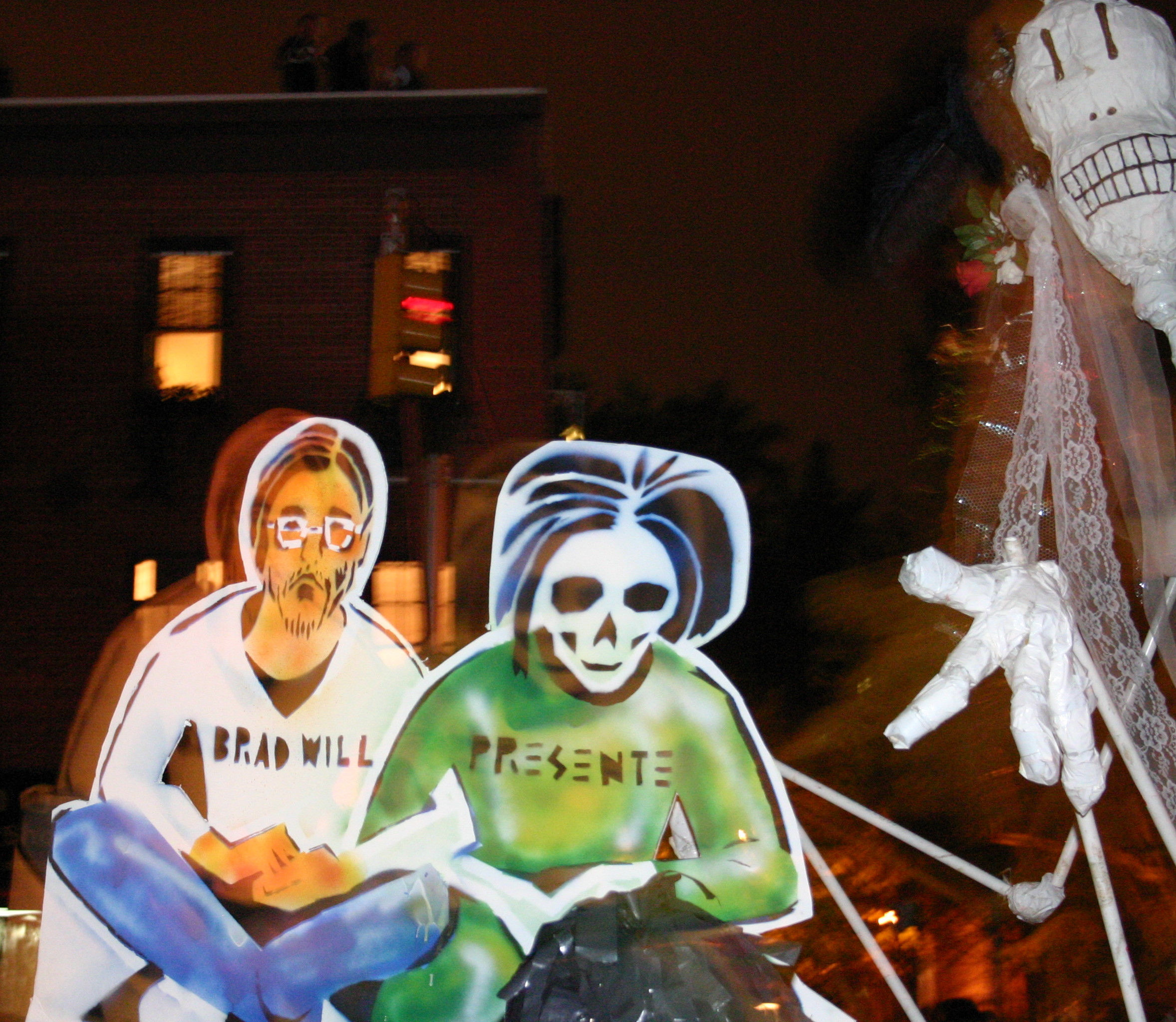
Poster of Will at the 2006 New York City Halloween Parade.

On November 11 and 12, 2006, Friends of Brad Will organized a gathering in New York City to commemorate Will's life. The event included a memorial service at St Mark's Church in-the-Bowery attended by 250 people, as well as speeches and concerts. Outside the church was an array of freegan food as well as a pile of Will's personal possessions, from which attendees were urged to take. It was followed by a procession through the East Village described by The Villager as "jubilant and rowdy" and culminated in marchers breaking into the former Charas/El Bohio, inside which they briefly cavorted, scrawled graffiti, twirled fire bolas and cycled.

=== Brad ===
David Rovics wrote a song about his life and death, titled 'Brad'.

== See also ==
- 2006 Oaxaca protests
- Asamblea Popular de los Pueblos de Oaxaca (APPO)
- List of journalists killed in Mexico
