= Deep Dish Television =

Television Distribution Network

Deep Dish Television was the first public access television distribution network in the United States. Created in 1986 by Paper Tiger Television and based in New York City, the network was committed to exploring new and democratic ways of promoting video artwork and reporting. Their programs connected artists, independent videomakers, programmers, and social activists, and covered political topics such as the environmental movement, U.S. healthcare, and the Iraq War.

== History ==
Deep Dish Television was launched in 1986 by the ongoing production collective Paper Tiger Television. DeeDee Halleck was a founding member of both organizations. Starting with their Opening Series in 1986 and ending with We Interrupt This Program in 2018, Deep Dish Television distributed the work of independent videomakers, filmmakers, and activists in curated series on a variety of political topics.

In 2005, Deep Dish Television broadcast the series Shocking and Awful: A Grassroots Response to War and Occupation investigating the impact of the U.S. invasion of Iraq. The series was later featured at the Whitney Museum's 2006 Biennial Exhibition and the Museum of Modern Art's "Theater of Operations: Gulf Wars 1991-2011" exhibition from 2019 to 2020. Deep Dish TV became known for their criticism of the Iraq War, and later produced extensive coverage of the World Tribunal on Iraq, the International Commission of Inquiry on Crimes Against Humanity of the Bush Administration, and the Winter Soldier Eyewitness Accounts of the Iraq and Afghanistan Occupations.

In addition to their television programming, Deep Dish Television frequently organized and participated in film festivals, conferences, screenings, panel discussions, exhibitions, and speaking tours across the United States. They also had a history of advocacy for public access media and collaboration with other independent media organizations, including Democracy Now!, Free Speech TV, Indymedia, and DIVA TV.

== Programming ==
Deep Dish Television's archives are held at Fales Library. Many of their productions have also been uploaded to their YouTube and Vimeo platforms. The hundreds of programs distributed by Deep Dish Television were packaged in the following series:

- The Opening Series, 1986
- Deep Dish Cooks Up a Second Series, 1988
- Fearless TV for the 90s, 1990
- Public Access: Spigot for Bigots or Channels for Change?, 1990
- DIVA TV: Collections from this Activist Collective, 1990
- ...Will be Televised: Video Documents from Asia, 1990
- News You Can Use, 1990
- Green Screen: Grassroots Views of the Environmental Crisis, 1990
- The Gulf Crisis Project, 1990-1991
- The Lannan Foundation Presents: Writers Uncensored, 1991
- Ideas and Power, 1991
- Behind Censorship: The Assault on Civil Liberties, 1991
- Celebrating 20 Years of Public Access Television, 1991
- ROAR! A Paper Tiger TV Mini Retrospective, 1991
- Unheard Voices, 1992
- Beyond the Browning of America, 1992
- Siempre Trabajando: Latinos and Labor, 1992
- Rock the Boat, 1992
- Visions of Ourselves, 1993
- L.A. Freewaves: Experimental Video from Southern California, 1993
- News You Can Use, 1993
- Democracy in Communications, 1993
- Sick and Tired of Being Sick and Tired, 1994
- News You Can Use, 1994
- Emergency Programming: Mumia Abu-Jamal, 1995
- Breaking Conventions, 1996
- America Behind Bars, 1997
- Showdown in Seattle, 1999
- Breaking the Bank, 2000
- Crashing the Party, 2000
- Inauguration, 2001
- Shocking and Awful: A Grassroots Response to War and Occupation, 2005
- The World Tribunal in Iraq, 2006
- Waves of Change: The Many Voices of the Global Village, 2007
- Nothing is Safe: Israel's 2006 War on Lebanon, 2008
- Winter Soldier, 2008
- DIY Media: Movement Perspectives on Critical Moments, 2008
- Rent-to-Own: Poverty Project, 2009
- Uprooted: A Grassroots Examination of the Politics of Migration, 2011
- An American Nightmare: Black Labor and Liberation, 2015
- We Interrupt This Program, 2018
