= Battle in Seattle =

2007 film

- Theatrical poster
- Directed by: Stuart Townsend
- Written by: Stuart Townsend
- Produced by: Mary Aloe; Kirk Shaw; Stuart Townsend; Maxime Rémillard
- Starring: André Benjamin; Jennifer Carpenter; Woody Harrelson; Martin Henderson; Ray Liotta; Ivana Miličević; Channing Tatum; Connie Nielsen; Michelle Rodriguez; Charlize Theron
- Cinematography: Barry Ackroyd
- Edited by: Fernando Villena
- Music by: Massive Attack
- Production companies: Hyde Park Entertainment; Grosvenor Park
- Distributed by: Redwood Palms Pictures
- Release dates: September 8, 2007 (Toronto International Film Festival); September 19, 2008 (United States)
- Running time: 99 minutes
- Countries: United States; Canada; Germany
- Language: English
- Budget: $10 million
- Box office: $886,461

Battle in Seattle is a 2007 political action-thriller film written and directed by Stuart Townsend, in his directorial debut. The story is loosely based on the protest activity at the WTO Ministerial Conference of 1999. The film had its world premiere at the Toronto International Film Festival on September 8, 2007. It later screened at the Seattle International Film Festival in May 2008 and received a limited theatrical release on September 19, 2008.

== Synopsis ==
The film depicts the protest in 1999, as thousands of activists arrive in Seattle, Washington in masses to protest the WTO Ministerial Conference of 1999. Protesters believe the World Trade Organization contributes to widening the wealth gap between the rich and the poor, while the WTO claims to be fixing the disparity and decreasing world hunger, disease, and death.

The movie takes an in-depth look at several fictional characters during those five days in 1999 as demonstrators protested the meeting of the WTO in Seattle's streets. The movie portrays conflicts between the peaceful protesters and people committing property destruction whose actions were widely covered by the media. Although the protest began peacefully with a goal of stopping the WTO talks, police began teargassing the crowd after it refused to clear the streets and the situation escalated into a full-scale riot and a State of Emergency that pitted protesters against the Seattle Police Department and the Washington National Guard.

== Cast ==
Though the film is based on actual events, the characters are fictional.

- Charlize Theron as Ella
- Michelle Rodriguez as Lou
- Martin Henderson as Jay
- Woody Harrelson as Dale
- André Benjamin as Django
- Connie Nielsen as Jean
- Ray Liotta as Mayor Jim Tobin (loosely based on real-life Seattle Mayor Paul Schell)
- Tzi Ma as Governor (loosely based on former Washington Governor Gary Locke)
- Ivana Miličević as Carla
- Channing Tatum as Johnson
- Jennifer Carpenter as Sam
- Joshua Jackson as Randall
- Isaach De Bankolé as Abasi
- Rade Serbedzija as Dr. Meric

== Production ==
=== Development ===
In 2002, Townsend became interested in making a film about the 1999 WTO protests when he read Anita Roddick's Take It Personally, a book about globalization that contained an essay about the event. "The story interested me because the WTO considers a lot of issues that were diffused somewhat by 9/11," he said. For research, Townsend read a number of books related to the event, including No Logo by Naomi Klein, Noreena Hertz's Silent Takeover, Jagdish Bhagwati's In Defense of Globalization, Joeseph Stiglitz's Making Globalization Work, and Alexander Cockburn's Five Days that Shook the World. Townsend said, "My overall sense, just as a human being studying it all, I found that the people who advocated free trade, that kind of economic-shock therapy, I really found that hard to digest. I didn’t agree with them, and I ended up very much agreeing with the protesters asking for labor rights and good working standards, and good environmental standards, and safety standards."

When Townsend began showing an early draft of the script to studios in the early 2000s, he could not find anyone willing to finance the film. He spent the next year retuning the script as he looked for producers. After making a fifteen-minute proof-of-concept film that spliced together three different documentaries, Townsend finally got the green-light to begin filming.

Major influences for Townsend were the documentary This Is What Democracy Looks Like, the 1969 film Medium Cool, and the 1976 film Network. Townsend wanted to experiment with different film styles, such as playing with montage, docudrama style, and combining shot footage with actual footage. He decided on an ensemble structure for the film while he was retuning the script. One of the misconceptions about the protests he wanted to counter in the film was that police officers began attacking the protesters only after the protesters became violent. Townsend said,

"Time and again, it was said that the police sprayed and pepper-gassed innocent, peaceful demonstrators. Time and again in the media, it was always referenced as the violent anarchists, and then the police responded, to which the mayor says, 'The police responded appropriately.' I wanted to give that context, show that the mayor makes that decision, and the police do gas indiscriminately. And then, yes, anarchists come smashing around, and the police continue. That was a very, very important distinction. I think that was probably the one major issue that activists had problems with in regards to mainstream media."

Among the concerns of Townsend was making sure to not vilify any one particular character. "One thing I liked about the research was that there were so many voices, and many of them were right and wrong at the same time. It was very hard to find a bad guy. I had big troubles with the film in the beginning because there was no antagonist, no singular bad guy, no villain. Then that kind of became interesting to me, because, the Mayor, he’s not really the villain, he’s more of a tragic character. In my research, that’s what I looked at him as. He wasn’t perfect, but I don’t think he was a bad guy. The police, plenty of people will say 'Fuck the police,' but I think most cops are just working-class joes doing a job. Some police are bad, but you can’t paint everyone with that brush." Townsend was also interested in the dissonance amongst the protesters themselves, who disagreed on matters like tactics.

=== Casting ===
André Benjamin was the first person Townsend cast in the role of Django. Early on, Susan Sarandon was rumored to be cast as a reporter who sympathizes with the demonstrators and comes into conflict with her editor, but she was unable to take part in the production. Michelle Rodriguez, Jennifer Carpenter, Channing Tatum and Tzi Ma were announced to have joined the cast in November 2006.

=== Filming ===
While some activists, such as David Solnit and Rice Baker Yeboah, who appeared in the This Is What Democracy Looks Like documentary, were wary of a film being made about the events from the perspective of the perceived mainstream media, other activists who participated in the protests assisted during filming by providing details for accuracy.

Benjamin's character had a line of dialogue that was excised from the film's final cut. In the scene, Django, dressed up in a turtle outfit during the protests, says "The police, if they see a black guy, they’re going to arrest him. They see a turtle, and they’re not going to do anything like that."

Nine minutes of footage from the actual protests were edited into the film.

Principal photography began on October 23, 2006. Filming was done in Vancouver, British Columbia, with locations including the Point Grey Campus of University of British Columbia, Granville Square, the foot of Vancouver Public Library, Fraser Street between 41st and 49th Avenues, the corner of Hastings and Hornby, and the corner of Hastings and Howe (corner of Hastings and Howe Leone and L2). Some filming was also done on location in Seattle.

== Release ==
The film premiered at the 2007 Toronto International Film Festival in September 2007 and was the opening film at the 2008 Seattle International Film Festival. It also screened at the South by Southwest Film Festival, Vancouver International Film Festival, Cleveland International Film Festival, and Florida Film Festival. The film was acquired for distribution by ThinkFilm, but as the company underwent financial problems, the rights were ultimately given to Redwood Palms Pictures, who released the film on September 19, 2008.

== Reception ==
On review aggregator site Rotten Tomatoes, the film holds a 57% approval rating based on 60 reviews. The site's critics consensus reads, "Well intentioned and passionate, this docu-drama about the 1999 WTO protests is heavier on politics than character development". Metacritic, which uses a weighted average, assigned the film a score of 54 out of 100, based on 17 critics, indicating "mixed or average" reviews.

Sara Cardace of New York called the film "a triumph" and praised the cast, while Chicago Sun-Times film critic Roger Ebert gave the film 3 out of 4 stars and described it as "not quite a documentary and not quite a drama, but interesting all the same" and compared it to past political films like Medium Cool. According to Owen Gleiberman of EW.com, the film "sounds like a bad TV movie: a drama based on the protests that halted the 1999 World Trade Organization summit in Seattle. Yet Stuart Townsend re-creates it all with stunning passion and skill".

In the Associated Press, Kirk Honeycutt wrote, "While it makes no bones about where its sympathies lie, these fictional stories show a genuine fascination with the role politics plays on both sides of such confrontations and how things can spin out of control with no single person to blame." He concluded, "The 1999 issues on display have not gone away. If anything, things are much worse. Another Seattle may not happen because governments have learned how to better prepare. But public anger, corporate greed and worldwide unrest continue unabated. 'Battle in Seattle' catches the opening skirmish."

Criticisms centered on the dialogue and the implausibility of some of the plot lines. Dennis Harvey of Variety felt "the human dramas imposed on nonfiction backdrop occasionally feel contrived", and some stories "convert from apolitically crass to conscientious a little too fast, notably Channing Tatum’s knucklehead cop and Connie Nielsen’s TV reporter", but the film's ambition and performances make up for its unevenness. Out of the cast, Harvey singled out Harrelson and Rade Serbedjiza.

== Reaction from activists ==
Some activists did not feel the protests were depicted accurately. David Solnit, who felt the film was a sanitized, Hollywood-style version of the story, set up a website and co-wrote a book purporting to provide his own account of the protests. The film was also criticized by anarchist collective CrimethInc. for what they saw as its sensationalistic portrayal of events. In a pamphlet titled "And What About Tomorrow?", the collective allege that the protests were characterized in the film as an isolated spontaneous uprising in which a "small fringe group" of black bloc anarchists "stole the show", whereas CrimethInc. contend that "anarchists were involved in all different aspects of the protests", including nonviolent organizations and Food Not Bombs, and credit the adoption of anarchist direct action tactics with the success of the uprising. A review published by Anarkismo praised the film as "clearly well-researched", citing the pacing and general narrative as quite accurate, but criticized the presentation of anarchist politics as one-dimensional and a caricature.

In response to some of the criticism, Townsend emphasized his film is not meant to be a documentary and said, "Although I don’t call my own film a Hollywood movie, because I don’t think it is—it’s absolutely independent and there’s a big distinction—what I am trying to do is make this a mainstream movie as much as possible. I think most activists realize that my intentions are good, and that this is a chance to reignite a debate, it’s a chance to refocus the spotlight. So it’s been really great. And then obviously there are just a few people who feel different, and that’s fine."

== See also ==
- 30 Frames a Second: The WTO in Seattle 2000, a photojournalist's first person documentary film shot during the protests and released in 2000
- Showdown in Seattle, a 1999 documentary about the protests
- Lee Kyung Hae, a Korean farmer cited at the end of the film
- Farmers' suicides in India, a statistic cited at the end of the film
- Protests against the Iraq War, cited at the end of the film
- List of American films of 2007

== Bibliography ==
- Solnit, David; Solnit, Rebecca (2008). The Battle of the Story of the Battle of Seattle. Edinburgh: AK Press. ISBN 978-1-904859-63-5. OCLC 182529206.
