= DeeDee Halleck =

American activist

DeeDee Halleck (born January 5, 1940) is a media activist, founder of Paper Tiger Television and co-founder of Deep Dish Television, the first grassroots community television network. She is a Professor Emerita in the Department of Communication at the University of California, San Diego.

== Career ==
Her first film, Children Make Movies (1961), was about a film-making project at Lillian Wald's Henry Street Settlement in Lower Manhattan. Her film, Mural on Our Street was nominated for an Academy Award in 1965. She has led media workshops with elementary school children, reform school youth, senior citizens and migrant farmers. In 1976 she was co-director of the Child-Made Film Symposium, which was a fifteen-year assessment of media by youth throughout the world.

She has served as a trustee of the American Film Institute, Women Make Movies and the Instructional Telecommunications Foundation. She has authored numerous articles in Film Library Quarterly, Film Culture, High Performance, The Independent, Leonardo, Afterimage and other media journals. Her book, Hand Held Visions: The Impossible Possibilities of Community Media, was published by Fordham University Press. She co-edited Public Broadcasting and the Public Interest with M.E. Sharpe, and has written essays for a number of collections on independent media.

In 1989 she received a Guggenheim Fellowship for an ecological series for the Deep Dish Network. She received two Rockefeller Media Fellowships for The Gringo in Mañanaland (1995), a compilation film about stereotypes of Latin Americans in U.S. films, which was featured at the Venice Film Festival, the London Film Festival and won a special jury prize at the Trieste Festival for Latin American Film and first prize from the American Anthropological Association's Visual Anthropology Division in 1998. Ah! The Hopeful Pageantry of Bread and Puppet, made in 2000 in collaboration with Tamar Schumann, was shown at the Woodstock Film Festival, The PDX Experimental Film Festival in Portland, Oregon, the Vermont Film Festival and the Dallas Video Festival.

She has received five awards for lifetime achievement: an Indy from the Association of Independent Video and Filmmakers, The George C. Stoney Award from the Alliance for Community Media (ACM); The Life Time Achievement Award of the National Alliance for Media Arts and Culture (NAMAC), the Herbert Schiller Award from the 2003 Schmio Awards and the 2007 Dallas Smythe Award from the Union for Democratic Communication.

She has co-coordinated Paper Tiger installations at the Whitney Museum of American Art, the Austrian Triennial of Photography in Graz, the Wexner Center in Columbus Ohio, the Gallery at the San Francisco Art Institute and the Berkeley Art Museum.

In 1990, before the first Gulf War started, she worked with a team of Paper Tiger and Deep Dish producers to create a series on the impending war, called The Gulf Crisis TV Project which ultimately produced ten half-hour programs which were widely shown on Public-access television stations, film festivals, the Whitney Museum, Channel Four in the UK and NHK in Japan. Her work with Deep Dish TV includes a twelve-part series on the prison industrial complex in the United States, Bars and Stripes (1996), and Shocking and Awful (2004–2005), a thirteen-part series on the 2003 invasion and occupation of Iraq. She is currently finishing a four-hour compilation of speeches and interviews from the World Tribunal on Iraq, which Deep Dish filmed in Istanbul in June 2005.

Halleck has been closely involved with the Independent Media Center movement, which now totals over 180 centers in sixty countries. She was one of the initial group of media activists that developed the first center in Seattle during the World Trade Organization protests. Her role was to develop the initial funding proposal for the center, raise funds from individual donors and organize 5 days of satellite broadcasting from that historic event. That work evolved into the television version of Democracy Now!, the Pacifica Network daily radio news series. After retiring from the University of California in 2001, Halleck worked full-time for a year (on a volunteer basis) to create the infrastructure and resources for Democracy Now! television, building on the contacts already established by Deep Dish. This daily news program is now on over 650 community television and radio stations and on the Dish Network of 15 million subscribers via Freespeech TV.

As President of the Association of Independent Video and Film Makers (AIVF) in the nineteen seventies, Halleck led a media reform campaign in Washington, testifying twice before the House Sub-Committee on Telecommunication for increased support and channel space for independent video and film. This work ultimately led to the creation of ITVS, the Independent Television Service. Halleck’s work in media reform includes working with a coalition of national organizations to insure public interest set-asides for Direct Broadcast Satellite (DBS). That successful campaign created the provisions which have allowed Free Speech TV, Link TV and a number of universities to have 24-hour television networks via satellite. Halleck has been involved in media policy reform on the international level as a member of the MacBride Roundtable on Communication, Communication Rights in the Information Society (CRIS) and as an official delegate to the World Summit on the Information Society in Geneva in 2003 and in Tunis in 2005.

Halleck worked with Victoria Maldonado on a series entitled "Waves of Change", which looks at community media around the world.

Halleck was the lead respondent in the 2019 Supreme Court case Manhattan Community Access Corp. v. Halleck.

In 2021, she was one of the participants in John Greyson's experimental short documentary film International Dawn Chorus Day.

== Sources ==
Hand Held Visions, Fordham University Press, 2002. Roar, Paper Tiger Catalog, Wexner Center, Ohio State University, 1996.
