= Nasaw =

Nasaw may refer to:

- Nasaw as a surname
  - David Nasaw (born 1945), American writer
- Nasaw Indians, another name for the Catawba
