= Free Speech TV =

Progressive-leaning television network

- Country: United States
- Headquarters: Denver, Colorado

Programming
- Language: English

Ownership
- Owner: Public Communicators Inc.

History
- Launched: 1995; 31 years ago

Links
- Website: freespeech.org

Availability

Streaming media
- Facebook: Live Stream
- Roku: Free Speech TV App
- Sling TV: Internet Protocol television
- Website Live Stream: freespeech.org/live-tv

Free Speech TV (FSTV) is an American progressive news and opinion network. It was launched in 1995 and is owned and operated by Public Communicators Incorporated, a 501(c)(3) non-profit, tax-exempt organization founded in 1974. Distributed principally by Dish Network, DirecTV, and the network's live stream at freespeech.org and on Roku, Free Speech TV has run commercial free since 1995 with support from viewers and foundations. The network claims to "amplify underrepresented voices and those working on the front lines of social, economic and environmental justice," predominantly from a progressive perspective.

== History ==
=== 1995–1999 ===
Free Speech TV is an outgrowth of three projects that attempted to establish wider dissemination of progressive perspectives on television: The 90's, a landmark television series seen on public television and cable; The 90's Channel, a network of seven full-time cable channels dedicated to independent media; and the part-time Free Speech TV Program Service, launched in 1995 as an innovative approach to curating and distributing independent media to a distribution network of community access cable stations. Public television stations carried some Free Speech TV's special series, such as Just Solutions: Campaigning for Human Right. The network's efforts in streaming media online won it a 1998 Streamers Award and 1999 Webby Award.

=== 2000–2006 ===
In January 2000—as the result of an FCC-mandated public interest channel set-aside—Free Speech TV became a national, full-time channel on the Dish Network satellite television system while continuing to build a national network of part-time local cable affiliates. Program highlights from the channel's formative years included live field reporting of the anti-globalization movement spawned at the 1999 WTO protests in Seattle; the 2000 US presidential elections, including Democracy Now!'s premiere as a television program at the Republican and Democratic conventions; the September 11 attacks, to which FSTV responded with a daily news report and weekly current affairs program; and extensive coverage of the large global anti-war mobilization and the subsequent U.S. invasions of Afghanistan and Iraq.

=== 2007–2010 ===
In 2007, FSTV moved from Boulder to Denver, covering events inside and outside the 2008 Democratic National Convention, where Barack Obama accepted his party's nomination for president. Over the following years, the network stepped up its daily coverage of national politics with the addition of GRITtv with Laura Flanders, The Big Picture with Thom Hartmann and Al Jazeera English. FSTV's daily news programs—led by The Thom Hartmann Program and Democracy Now!—became FSTV's top programs in terms of popularity and "stickiness" (a measure of audience engagement and loyalty). During the Arab Spring, FSTV pre-empted much of its regular non-news programming to Al Jazeera English's reporting from Cairo's Tahrir Square and other locations.

=== 2011–2012 ===
In 2011 and 2012, FSTV coverage provided a window into efforts to reform workers' rights in Wisconsin and other states, as well as into the Occupy Wall Street movement. The network secured a national channel on DirecTV in 2010; piloted its first OTT ("over-the-top") channel, on Roku, in 2011; and launched full-time cable channels in Burlington, Vermont, and Ashland, Oregon, in 2012.

FSTV and GM Jon Stout were the recipients of the 2010 National Professional Freedom and Responsibility Award, presented by the Association for Education in Journalism and Mass Communication. This award recognizes individuals and organizations for "a profound commitment to free expression; ethics; media criticism and accountability; racial, gender, and cultural inclusiveness; and public service."

=== 2013–present ===
In 2013, FSTV started conferring with public television stations to gain over-the-air and cable carriage in major urban markets. The shutdown of the progressive channel Current TV and its replacement with Al Jazeera America had major ramifications on the network. In August 2013 Free Speech TV lost its popular Al Jazeera English News Hour, The Stream and Fault Lines shows when Al Jazeera launched Al Jazeera America. The news programming was replaced with news from France 24.

On September 9, 2013, Bill Press joined the channel with his simulcast of The Bill Press Show, which moved over from the defunct Current TV. In January 2014 the channel added The Stephanie Miller Show, also from the defunct Current TV after a successful Indiegogo campaign to raise funds to build the show's new radio/TV studio, buy equipment and produce the show. This reunites the former Current TV morning block on Free Speech TV.

In October 2013 Free Speech TV and Karel.Media in association with Brandon Riley Miller Productions launched Karel's Life in Segments starring Charles Karel Bouley. In October 2014, Free Speech TV launched Uprising with Sonali, featuring Sonali Kolhatkar in partnership with Pacifica Radio station KPFK-FM, Los Angeles. Uprising Radio was the longest running daily morning show on Southern California public radio before premiering as a television show on Free Speech TV.

In recent years, FSTV's television footprint has grown to more than 40 million homes. The network's monthly viewership (cumulative) nearly doubled to more than 1 million households over a two-year period between 2012 and 2014.

== Funding ==
Free Speech TV is a project of Public Communicators, Inc., a non-profit, 501c3 tax-exempt organization FSTV is supported primarily through philanthropic contributions from thousands of viewers and from foundations dedicated to independent media and social, economic and environmental justice.

== Availability ==
FSTV is currently available in more than 40 million television homes nationwide, airing full-time on Dish Network (269), DirecTV (348), Burlington Telecom (122) and Ashland Home Net (96). Select programs are syndicated on 177 community cable stations in 40 states. FSTV is also available as a 24/7 linear feed and as videos-on-demand—on freespeech.org and on Roku, an "over-the-top" distribution platform that streams video over the Internet onto connected television sets. FSTV also has a feed on the Sling TV service. Other content is syndicated on Facebook, YouTube, Vimeo and other social networking sites.

== Programming ==
Free Speech TV broadcasts syndicated news programs and documentaries that deal with social, political, cultural and environmental issues. Independently produced news programs broadcast on FSTV include:

=== News ===
- Democracy Now! – Award-winning news coverage from Amy Goodman and Juan Gonzalez.
- France 24 World News – A one-hour news program from France 24.
- The Last Sip – Current events program with Imara Jones, focusing on women and LGBTQ people of color, with an emphasis on millennials
- Rising Up with Sonali – News program that emphasizes connecting global issues with local ones and hosted by veteran broadcaster Sonali Kolhatkar.
- Source Code, stylized as SourceCode – News magazine (TV show) launched in 2007

=== Talk shows and radio shows ===
- The Thom Hartmann Program – A daily call-in news and leftist political program with author and host Thom Hartmann, based in Portland, Oregon. On Fridays, it includes Brunch With Bernie – A one-hour talk segment with Senator Bernie Sanders.
- The Big Picture with Thom Hartmann – A Liberal nightly news program hosted by Thom Hartmann.
- The Stephanie Miller Show – Syndicated Liberal talk show hosted by Stephanie Miller.
- The Bill Press Show – Liberal morning talk show.
- The David Pakman Show – A daily call-in news and political talk program hosted by Pakman from Northampton, Massachusetts.
- Ring of Fire – Liberal morning talk show hosted by Mike Papantonio
- The Randi Rhodes Show – Liberal morning talk show hosted by Randi Rhodes.
- The Rick Smith Show – American working class talk show hosted by Rick Smith
- The Zero Hour with RJ Eskow – Progressive radio and TV show hosted by Richard "RJ" Eskow.

=== Other programs ===
- Gay USA – A weekly news program dedicated to gay and LGBT issues and news, hosted by Andy Humm and Ann Northrop from Brooklyn, NY.
- OpenLine Media Presents: News With Davy D – A news program hosted by historian, author, rapper and talk-show host Davy DMX.
- Bioneers – Interviews with personalities involved in social and scientific developments in sustainability.
- Pirate Television – Offers talks, interviews and documentaries about independent voices.
- Enviro Close Up, – Hosted by Karl Grossman
- Every Church Is A Peace Church
- Occupy the Media
- Meet the Farmer – Hosted by Michael Clark
- Chicago Independent TV – Produced by Chicago Indymedia
- Rox – in the early days of Free Speech TV, this was "the network's most popular show."
- The Empire Files – documentary and interview series hosted by Abby Martin.
- Act Out – "Covers the news corporate media won't touch", hosted by Eleanor Goldfield

== See also ==
- Link TV
- Open Media Foundation
- Showdown in Seattle
