= David Nasaw =

American historian (born 1945)

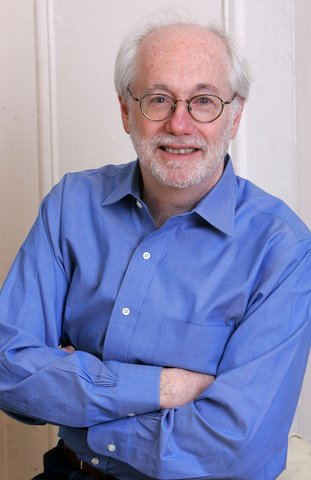
- Nasaw in 2012
- Born: David George Nasaw; July 18, 1945 (age 81); Cortland, New York, U.S.
- Education: Bucknell University (B.A); Columbia University (Ph.D)
- Occupation: Arthur M. Schlesinger Jr. Professor of History
- Employer: CUNY Graduate Center
- Known for: Historian, author
- Spouse: Dinitia Smith (m. 1978)
- Children: 2

David Nasaw (born July 18, 1945) is an American author, biographer and historian who specializes in the cultural, social, and business history of early twentieth-Century America. Nasaw is on the faculty of the Graduate Center of the City University of New York, where he is the Arthur M. Schlesinger Jr. Professor of History.

In addition to writing numerous scholarly and popular books, he has written for publications such as the Columbia Journalism Review, The American Historical Review, American Heritage, Dissent, The New Yorker, The New York Times, The Wall Street Journal, Slate, The London Review of Books, and Condé Nast Traveler.

Nasaw has appeared in several documentaries, including a 1996 episode of The American Experience, as well as two episodes of the History Channel 2006 miniseries 10 Days That Unexpectedly Changed America, "The Homestead Strike", and "The Assassination of President McKinley". He is cited extensively in the U.S. and British media as an expert on the history of popular entertainment and the news media, and as a critic of American philanthropy.

== Early life and education ==
David George Nasaw was born on July 18, 1945 to a Jewish family in Cortland, New York; he was the oldest son of attorney Joshua Nasaw (1909–1970) and Beatrice Kaplan (1917–2010), an elementary school teacher.

Nasaw grew up in Roslyn, New York, and, after a year studying in Denmark as an exchange student, was graduated from Roslyn High School in 1963. Nasaw received a bachelor of arts from Bucknell University in 1967, before enrolling in Columbia University, where he was awarded a Ph.D. in 1972 for his dissertation, "Jean-Paul Sartre: Apprenticeship in History (1925–45)".

While studying at Columbia University, for more than two years from 1970 Nasaw was one of two full-time teachers in the Elizabeth Cleaners Street School, a short-lived experimental alternative free high school founded in New York City. The experience gave rise to the book Starting Your Own High School, written by the students and edited by Nasaw. One of his students at the school was the chess player Peter Winston.

== Career ==
Nasaw's next teaching experience was that of teaching history at the College of Staten Island in 1978. During the 1987–1988 academic year, he was as a Fulbright Professor of American Studies at Hebrew University in Jerusalem. Nasaw has been on the doctoral faculty of the City University of New York Graduate Center since 1990, where he also served as chairman. He was director of the Center for the Humanities at CUNY Graduate Center as well. He also was the chairman of the advisory board of the Leon Levy Center for Biography at the university.

Nasaw is a founder of the Radical History Review.

Although he has published three biographies, Nasaw describes himself as an academic historian, rather than a biographer. A historian, he says, "sweeps away the fables, the myths, the stories" and places scholarly subjects "in time and over time", while for biographers, the organization of the work is laid out in advance. "Writing history is not an art but a craft", Nasaw has said. "It requires interpretation and fifty sources and integrating and assembling this material into a story told by an individual voice."

During an interview of Nasaw regarding his book entitled, The Wounded Generation: Coming Home After World War II, historian Julian Zelizer stated that Nasaw's publication changed forever, how the generation of veterans returning from World War II would be viewed.

== Personal life ==
On June 10, 1978, Nasaw married Dinitia Smith, a novelist, Emmy award-winning filmmaker, and journalist, who worked as a correspondent for The New York Times for twelve years. They are the parents of twin sons, Peter Caleb Nasaw and Daniel Allen Nasaw, born in 1980. Daniel is a journalist.

Nasaw is the older brother of Jonathan Lewis Nasaw (b. August 26, 1947), the prolific author of at more than nine thrillers. His sister, Elizabeth Perl Nasaw (May 29, 1956 – February 28, 2004), who as "Elizabeth Was" (later "Liz Was" and finally "Lyx Ish") was a poet and publisher of avant-garde magazines, and the cofounder of Xexoxial Editions and Dreamtime Village in West Lima, Wisconsin.

== Awards ==
- 2013 – Finalist, Pulitzer Prize for biography
- 2007 – Finalist, Pulitzer Prize for biography
- 2006 – American History Book Prize
- 2006 – New-York Historical Society American History Book Prize
- 2001 – Bancroft Prize
- 2001 – Ambassador Book Award
- 2001 – J. Anthony Lukas Book Prize
- 2001 – Ann M. Sperber Biography Award for Journalism

== Bibliography ==
=== Books ===
- Nasaw, David, ed. (1972). Starting your own high school. Random House.
- Schooled to Order: A Social History of Public Schooling in United States (Oxford University Press, 1979, 1980)
- Children of the City: At Work and at Play (Anchor Press/Doubleday, 1985; Oxford University Press, 1986)

In this widely cited history, Nasaw "unearthed the long-forgotten story of the Newsboy Strike" of 1899 in New York City, as well as the Boston Newsboys Republic, founded in 1908 — a short-lived experiment in self-government in which 3,000 city newsboys took on the responsibility for making and enforcing their own street-trading laws. The book inspired the Disney film Newsies and the subsequent Broadway musical.

- Course of United States History: To 1877, Volume 1, ed. (Thomson Wadsworth, 1987)
- Going Out: The Rise and Fall of Public Amusements (Basic Books, 1993)

Critic Jackson Lears wrote in the New York Times that Going Out "unearths fascinating details about everything from the early history of the movies to pre-World War I dance crazes", and that Nasaw "raises fundamental questions about the web of connections joining commercial play, public space and cultural cohesion".

- The Chief: The Life of William Randolph Hearst (Houghton Mifflin, 2000)

Nasaw's 2000 biography of the American newspaper baron was praised as "an absorbing and ingeniously organized biography... of the most powerful publisher America has ever known", and for "immediacy that almost makes the reader forget that the author himself was not there as the story unfolded". In 2001, The Chief won the J. Anthony Lukas Book Prize and the Bancroft Prize for American history. It was nominated for a National Book Critics Circle Award.

- Andrew Carnegie (Penguin Press, 2006)

Nasaw's 2006 biography of the American steel mogul, was a finalist for the 2007 Pulitzer Prize for biography.: A reviewer praised Nasaw for "bringing to life the fascinating world of business moguls, statesmen, journalists, and intellectuals in which Carnegie moved." Praising Nasaw's "keen all-rounder's eye", Christopher Hitchens wrote: "The great strength of this immense biography is the way in which David Nasaw causes these tributaries — capitalism, radicalism, and educational aspiration — to converge like the three rivers (the Allegheny, the Ohio, and the Monongahela) whose confluence makes the site of Pittsburgh possible." The book was among The New York Times' 100 Notable Books of the Year, and among the Favorite Books of 2006 by the Los Angeles Times, which praised it as "a fresh and thorough assessment".

- The Patriarch: The Remarkable Life and Turbulent Times of Joseph P. Kennedy (Penguin Press, November 2012)

Following the success of Nasaw's 2000 biography of William Randolph Hearst, Senator Ted Kennedy approached Nasaw to write a biography of his father, Kennedy patriarch Joseph P. Kennedy. Nasaw told the family that as an academic historian, he had no interest in writing an "authorized biography". "I told him I would undertake this project if I had guarantees to see all the documents at the Kennedy Library and elsewhere, and if I were free to write whatever I wanted, with no censorship or interference of any kind," Nasaw said. Senator Kennedy said he had read and admired Nasaw's book on Hearst and believed the historian would make a "fair evaluation of his life and contributions". The Kennedy family agreed to sit for interviews and to make Joseph Kennedy's private papers available. After publication, the book was nominated for the Pulitzer Prize for Biography in 2013.

- Nasaw, David (2020). The Last Million: Europe's Displaced Persons from World War to Cold War. Allen Lane.
- The Wounded Generation: Coming Home After World War II (Penguin Press 2025)

=== Selected articles ===
- "Earthly Delights", The New Yorker, March 23, 1998
- "The Empire Builders", The New York Times, November 24, 2002
- "Hitler, Stalin, O'Malley and Moses", The New York Times, May 25, 2003
- "A Real Nice Clambécque", The New York Times, September 21, 2003
- "They Wanted to Shape Up America", The New York Times, September 27, 2003
- "Billionaires to the Rescue", The New York Times, July 4, 2006
- "Giving back, big time", Los Angeles Times – November 2, 2006
- "Looking the Carnegie Gift Horse in the Mouth", Slate.com, November 10, 2006
- "We Can't Rely on the Kindness of Billionaires", Washington Post, September 23, 2007
- "The Rich Threaten Democracy", Pittsburgh Tribune, October 14, 2007
- "A Violent Regeneration", American Prospect, May 23, 2009
- "Banking on the Future", The Wall Street Journal – May 17, 2011
- Nasaw, David (Winter 2019). "A 'fool for peace'". Carnegie Reporter. 11 (1): 38–45.

=== Critical studies and reviews of Nasaw's work ===
The last million

- Hoffman, Adina (September 15, 2020). "How a Million Refugees Became Postwar Pawns of the Allies". The New York Times.
- Fitzpatrick, Sheila (January–February 2021). "Knotty problems : an examination of Europe's displaced persons". Australian Book Review. 428: 12, 14.
