= Open publishing =

Online publishing model

Open publishing is a term used by Matthew Arnison in March 2001 to describe the online process of creating text, audio and video news by methods that are fully transparent to the readers. In the early 2000s, the term was widely associated with the online Indymedia network.

== History ==
The aim of open publishing described by Matthew Arnison was that anybody could contribute a story and see it instantly appear in the pool of stories publicly available. Those stories are filtered as little as possible to help the readers find the stories they want. Readers can see editorial decisions being made by others. They can see how to get involved and help make editorial decisions. If they can think of a better way for the software to help shape editorial decisions, they can copy the software because it is free and open source to change it and start their own site. If they want to redistribute the news, they can, preferably on an open publishing site.

Internet sites run on open publishing software allow anyone with Internet access to visit the site and upload content directly without having to penetrate the filters of traditional media. Several fundamental principles tend to inform the organizations and sites dedicated to open publishing, though they do so to varying degrees. These principles include non-hierarchy, public participation, minimal editorial control, and transparency.

== Related ideas ==
Arnison's idea of open publishing can be compared to Eric S. Raymond's point of view in the open source software versus free software debate. Given a large enough audience of peers, readers and/or commentators, supporters of open publishing hope or expect that almost all problematic content will quickly be noticed, highlighted and fixed. Linus's law could in this be context be described as Arnison's Law, reworded as, "Given enough eyeballs, problematic content is shallow".

The term "open publishing" is intended to be much more open than the more restricted idea of open access publishing, in which the publishing of material organized in such a way that there is no financial or other barrier to the reader, but there is no claim for transparency in the methods and procedures of publishing. In other words, open publishing is open access, but open access publishing is only sometimes "open publishing".

== Examples ==
Online historical and existing networks typically associated with open publishing include the Independent Media Center network, Kuro5hin, Slashdot, Wikipedia and Wikinews.

== See also ==
- Collaborative writing
- Fair Access to Science and Technology Research Act, U.S. House of Representatives
- Free content
- Open access
- Open content
- Open source journalism
- Participatory economics
- Participatory journalism
- Peer review
