= Dinitia Smith =

American author and filmmaker (born 1945)

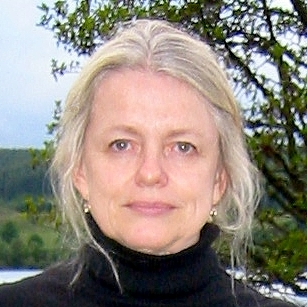
- Born: December 26, 1945 (age 80); Cumberland, Maryland, U.S.
- Other name: Dinitia McCarthy
- Education: New York University Film School
- Occupations: Author; filmmaker
- Years active: 1971–present
- Spouse: David Nasaw (m. 1978)
- Children: 2
- Awards: Emmy Award, 1975

Dinitia Smith (born December 26, 1945) is an American author and filmmaker.

== Early life and education ==
Smith was born in Cumberland, Maryland, and raised primarily in Great Britain, where her father was a journalist. She came to the United States in 1959, and lived in New York City and Westchester. After graduating from Smith College, she worked as a reporter for the Associated Press in New York. She enrolled in the New York University Film School, and in 1971 obtained a Master of Fine Arts degree.

== Career ==
In 1971, she wrote and directed her first film, Passing Quietly Through, under her then-married name McCarthy. That film was one of the first films by a woman to be chosen for the New York Film Festival. Smith continued to make documentaries, including some with American documentary filmmaker, David Grubin, and also wrote several screenplays. Her films have been shown at the Whitney Museum and the Museum of Modern Art.

In 1975, Smith won an Emmy Award for a film she made for WNBC–TV. She published her first novel, The Hard Rain, in 1980. Her second novel, Remember This, won her fellowships from the National Endowment for the Arts and the Ingram Merrill Foundation. Her short fiction has been published in numerous literary journals.

Smith was also a contributing editor at New York magazine; from 1995 to 2006, she worked for The New York Times, where she wrote about arts and intellectual trends and ideas. Her third novel, The Illusionist, published in 1997, was a New York Times Notable Book of the Year.

The Honeymoon, her biographical novel about the 19th-century writer George Eliot, was published in 2016. The New York Times wrote that "Smith's enchanting account humanizes a figure renowned as much for her refutation of conventional female stereotypes and social limitations as for her genius for story and language". A reviewer for The Washington Post called the book "the perfect example of when fictional storytelling about an eminent person is warranted".

Smith's fifth novel, The Prince (Arcade Publishing, 2022), is a contemporary retelling of Henry James's The Golden Bowl. NPR called The Prince "a winner …a compelling story of sexual obsession and the expectations and tolerances of society.” Novelist Lee Child described The Prince as "Beautiful, elegant and delicate". The National Book Review called the novel "deliciously satisfying".

Smith has taught at Columbia University and the Bread Loaf Writers' Conference.

== Personal life ==
Smith has been married to historian and author David Nasaw since 1978. It is a second marriage for both. They have two sons.

== Bibliography ==
- The Hard Rain, Dial Press (1980), ISBN 9780803734098
- Remember This, Henry Holt & Co (1989), ISBN 9780805010367
- The Illusionist, Scribner (1997), ISBN 9780684843292
- The Honeymoon, Other Press (2016), ISBN 9781590517789
- The Prince, Arcade Publishing (March 2022), ISBN 9781950994199
