= Direct Action Network =

Direct Action Network (DAN) was a North American confederation of anti-corporate, anti-authoritarian and anarchist affinity groups, collectives, and organizations. It grew out of the Seattle chapter which had been formed to coordinate the nonviolent civil disobedience portion of the anti-WTO mobilization in Seattle in 1999.

== History ==
Seattle DAN was formed in response to the call for direct action against the WTO conference by People's Global Action. Members of the Art and Revolution Collective, based in San Francisco, sought funding for their WTO actions from a coalition of NGOs led by Public Citizen and Global Exchange. Simultaneously, local activists in Seattle began meeting to plan disruptive protest. The Seattle group envisioned a "decentralized network of people who would organize autonomous actions," while the San Francisco group envisioned "a coherent organization...that would come together around a fixed day action." According to San Francisco organizer David Solnit, the two groups merged "somewhat awkwardly," with differences over property destruction being a particular source of tension.

Soon after the Seattle mobilization, several DAN chapters formed a Continental Direct Action Network (CDAN), which rapidly expanded into branches in 12 cities in the United States and Canada. CDAN, as well as many of the local chapters, adopted principles of unity based on those of Peoples' Global Action.

Regional DANs were formed of autonomous affinity groups which coordinated actions via spokescouncils using delegation and consensus decision-making.

According to former NYC DAN organizer David Graeber:

Chapters operating in different cities soon came to be classified into two broad tendencies: anti-corporate, or anti-capitalist. The former tended to be more reformist in orientation, more oriented towards the [nonviolence] tradition and suspicious of more militant styles of direct action, more interested in appealing to the middle classes around concepts like fair trade and green consumerism. The latter were more explicitly anarchist and revolutionary. The most prominent examples of the former tendency were Seattle DAN and LA DAN, both of which continued to be dominated by NGO activists...The vast majority of groups that were within the DAN network, however, including NYC DAN, the Philadelphia Direct Action Group (PDAG), San Francisco and Humboldt County DAN, Chicago DAN, and many others, were plainly anti-capitalist. They had little NGO participation, but were made up instead mainly of independent activists and members of local anarchist collectives...

Other than Seattle, DAN played a key role in organizing the following protests/mobilizations:

- International Monetary Fund/World Bank protests, April 8–17, 2000
- Republican National Convention protests, Philadelphia, July 29, 2000
- Democratic National Convention protests, Los Angeles, August 11, 2000
- George W. Bush Inauguration, Washington, DC, January 20, 2001
- World Economic Forum protests, New York City, NY, February 2, 2002

== Decline ==
After the September 11 attacks in 2001, DAN began to fall apart. DAN's last major mobilization was in New York City in February 2002, where remnants of the local chapter was responsible for organizing actions against the World Economic Forum attended by between 15,000 and 20,000 individuals. NYCDAN was later eclipsed by the Another World is Possible Coalition (AWIP), a local NYC network which was originally formed by DAN members.

Since DANs evaporation, many former activists have gone on to play pivotal roles in regional and national mobilizations and groups, including anti-war organizing, NY Peoples' Global Action, NYC Social Forum, New York Metro Alliance of Anarchists and other organizational work. The websites for both Continental Direct Action Network and Direct Action Network are no longer maintained except for an archived version.

== Hand signals in consensus process ==
A feature of DAN's consensus process was the use of hand signals. These included twinkling to indicate agreement with a proposal, as well as other signals now widely used in consensus culture.

== See also ==
- Indymedia
- Anti-globalization

== Archives ==
- World Trade Organization 1999 Seattle Ministerial Conference Protest Collection 1993-2000. 43.63 cubic feet. At the Labor Archives of Washington, University of Washington Libraries Special Collections.
