= 1988 IMF/World Bank protests =

Series of international protests

The 1988 annual meetings of the International Monetary Fund (IMF) and World Bank were met with an international protest in West Berlin. Whereas the organizations' earlier meetings were met with smaller, national protests, the 1988 meetings attracted protesters internationally against what was the largest assembly of the international monetary order since the 1944 Bretton Woods Conference. Protesters demonstrated against the IMF's austerity policies towards developing nations. Representatives from Third World countries called for debt cancellation, and others advocated for solutions to world hunger and poverty. Due to the protest's high-profile venue, media outlets extensively covered the protests. Later IMF and World Bank meetings received smaller protests, but following the 1999 Seattle WTO protests, all meetings of the IMF, World Bank, G7, and G8 summits were met with significant protests.
