= Steal This Radio =

American pirate radio station

Steal This Radio (STR) was a pirate radio station based in New York City with roots in the local squatter community. The 12-watt station broadcast at 88.7 FM starting in November 1995.

== History ==
In May 1995, police evicted squatters in two Lower East Side buildings at 541 and 545 East 13th Street. A member of the squatter community who uses the name Queequeg was inspired by Radio Free Berkeley and worked with another squatter who was also a HAM radio enthusiast, Fast Forward, to set up Steal This Radio. Fast Forward set up much of the technical infrastructure for about $500.

At the time it was broadcasting, the FCC had not issued licenses to broadcasters transmitting at under 100 watts since 1978, and all available frequencies in Manhattan had already been issued. Steal This Radio broadcast at 12 watts using equipment considerably cheaper than that which would be necessary for 100 watts.

For two years of its operation it broadcast from a Lower East Side squat. Other times, to avoid getting caught, organizers frequently moved the site of broadcasting, transporting all of its equipment to different locations each week and setting up the transmitter anew.

== Programming ==
Steal This Radio's programming included live music, recorded music, radio dramas, news, and cultural programming. Most of its content featured or was relevant to residents of the Lower East Side area of Manhattan, including human interest stories, information about non-profits and services, stories, weather, and event listings. The Village Voice described it as "radio at its most unabashedly free-form," adding that the project was "localized free expression as an act of electronic civil disobedience." It broadcast for six hours on Friday nights, starting at 8:00 PM.

According to one of the organizers, broadcasts often took the form of a party.

== Legal trouble ==
On March 5, 1998, an FCC agent visited operators of the station after tracing its broadcast location to a building on East 7th Street, threatening legal action if they did not stop broadcasting. The operators complied temporarily to preserve the safety of the squat, which subsequently had its power cut due to FCC working with Con Edison. Though citing a complaint by Hofstra University, a representative of the university denied any filing. Though they ceased operations for a month following the incident, they returned in a public spectacle of turning on a battery-powered transmitter on Wall Street, at the same time announcing a lawsuit operators filed against the FCC, Justice Department, and Janet Reno. The suit claimed policies regarding low power broadcasting were unconstitutional, and was filed by a collective which identified itself as "Free Speech," leading to a case titled FCC v. Free Speech. On March 12, 1999, the U.S. District Court for the Southern District of New York denied their complaint and issued an injunction.
