= Showdown in Seattle =

Showdown in Seattle: Five Days That Shook the WTO
- Distributed by: Deep Dish Television, Independent Media Center, Big Noise Films, Changing America, Free Speech TV, Headwaters Action Video, Paper Tiger TV, VideoActive, and Whispered Media
- Release date: 1999
- Running time: 2 hours 30 minutes
- Country: United States
- Language: English

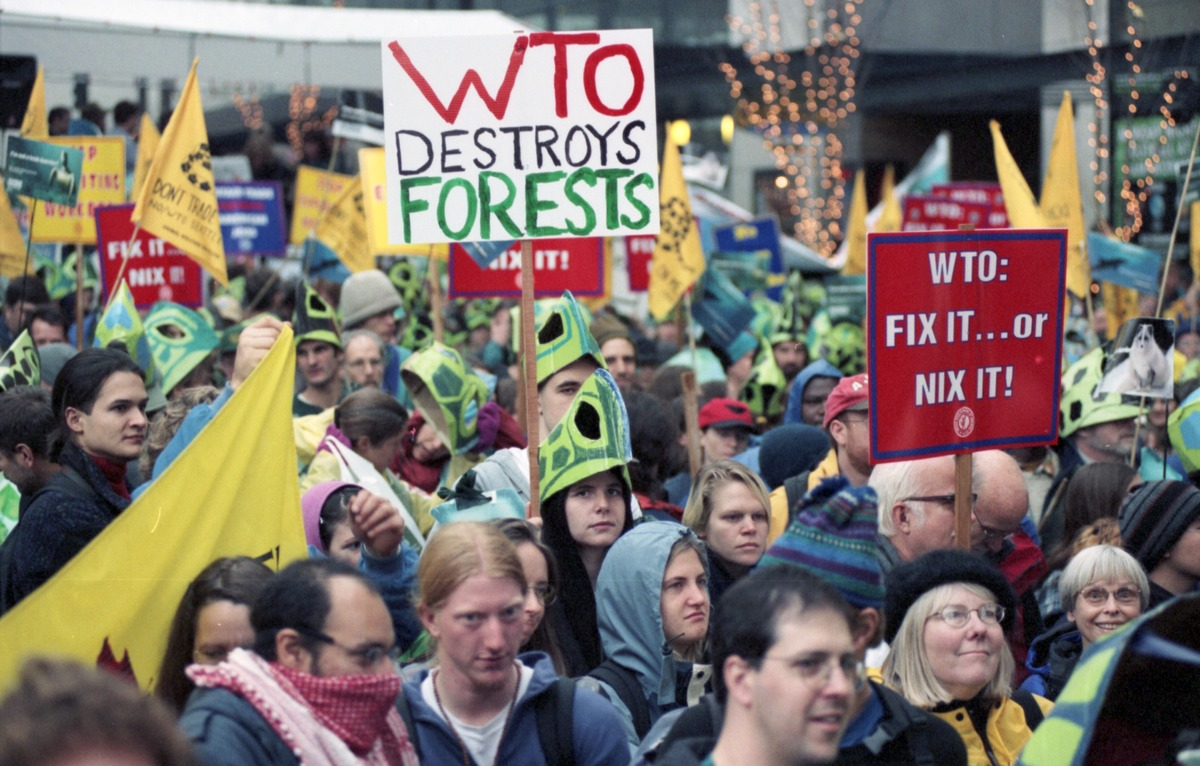
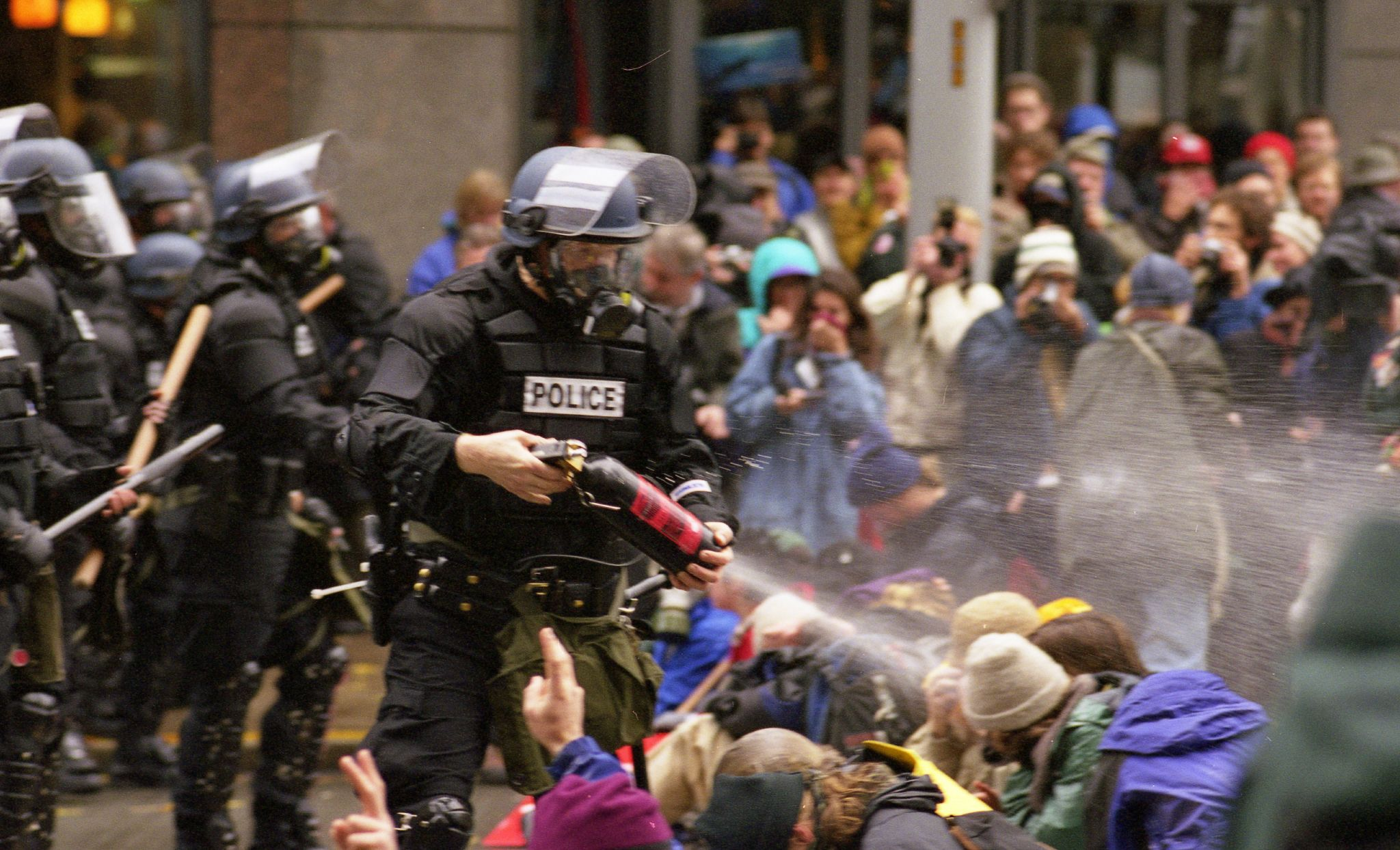

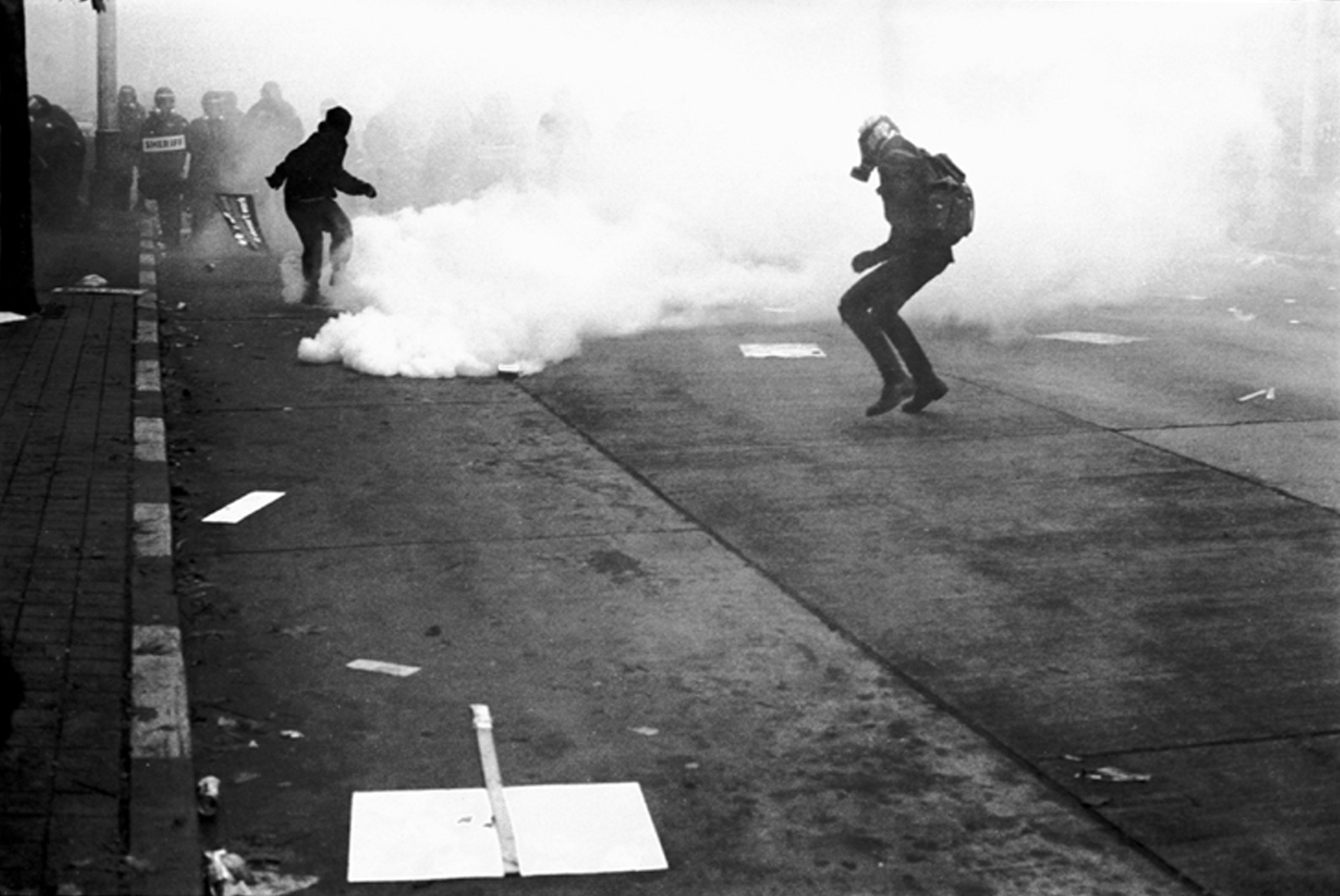
Photographs from the November 1999 protests against the 1999 Ministerial Conference of the World Trade Organization in Seattle

Showdown in Seattle: Five Days That Shook the WTO is a 1999 documentary film, first broadcast in daily half-hour installments, about the November 1999 protests against the Ministerial Conference of the World Trade Organization (WTO) in Seattle, Washington.

== Background ==
Activists and groups on the left opposed the World Trade Organization and its 1999 Ministerial Conference in Seattle as they saw the WTO as anti-democratic, autocratic, secretive and unaccountable, and as a threat to democratic oversight and national sovereignty. The Uruguay Round of trade negotiations, which sought to limit the effects of "barriers to trade" such as food safety laws, safety standards and investment laws, was especially vociferously opposed. The tactics employed by protesters in Seattle, such as the use of lock-ons, were influenced by innovations made by Earth First! from the mid-1990s.

== Production ==
The film was produced by Deep Dish Television, the Independent Media Center, Big Noise Films, Changing America, Free Speech TV, Headwaters Action Video, Paper Tiger TV, VideoActive, and Whispered Media.

== Overview ==
Showdown in Seattle comprises five 30-minute segments that chronicle the protest events of the week of November 29 to December 5, 1999. Its documentation of events on the streets is intermingled with contextual information about the work of the WTO and statements from representatives of organizations that participated in the protests. The film focuses in particular on the space of the street, where people were brought together by protests and direct actions: not only the trade unionists, environmentalists and anarchists brought together by their shared opposition to the WTO, but also interactions between protesters and WTO delegates. One section of the film juxtaposes interviews with protesters who describe these encounters and alliances with footage of "the actual occurrence of collective mobilization and identities occurring on the street." The film's final two segments focus on global food production and attacks on civil liberties alleged by members of the National Lawyers Guild to have been committed by police during the protests.

The film also documents the formation of the Independent Media Center a month prior to the protests. The filmmaker and critic Hito Steyerl, in an essay on Showdown in Seattle and "the articulation of protest," describes the film's depiction of its own process of production as follows:

Toward the end of the two and a half-hour film series, there is a segment, in which the viewer is taken on a tour through the production site of the film, the studio set up in Seattle. What is seen there is impressive. The entire film was shot and edited during the period of the protests. A half-hour program was broadcast every evening. This requires a considerable logistic effort, and the internal organization of the [Independent Media Center] office accordingly does not look principally different from a commercial TV broadcaster. We see how pictures from countless video cameras come into the studio, how they are viewed, how useable sections are excerpted, how they are edited into another shot, and so forth. Various media are listed, in which and through which publicizing is carried out, such as fax, telephone, WWW, satellite, etc. We see how the work of organizing information, in other words pictures and sound, is conducted: there is a video desk, production plans, etc. What is presented is the portrayal of a chain of production of information, or more precisely in the definition of the producers: counter-information, which is negatively defined by its distance to the information from the corporate media criticized for their one-sidedness. What this involves, then, is a mirror-image replica of the conventional production of information and representation with all its hierarchies, a faithful reproduction of the corporate media's manner of production – only apparently for a different purpose.

== Critical reception ==
Steyerl describes the film as "extraordinarily stirring" and examines its uncritical use of the conceit of the "voice of the people", understood as "the addition of voices of individual speakers from protest groups, [non-governmental organizations], unions, etc." Steyerl compares the juxtaposition of these groups and individuals' differing, and sometimes contradictory, viewpoints to the filmic technique of montage:

the different statements are thus transformed into a chain of formal equivalencies, which adds the political demands together in the same way that pictures and sounds are strung together in the conventional chain of montage in the media chain of production. In this way, the form is completely analogous to the language of form used by the criticized corporate media, only the content is different, namely an additive compilation of voices resulting in the voice of the people when taken together.

Herman Gilman, writing in the Labor Studies Journal, described the film as "an unprecedented illustration of how far evolved is the anti-corporate coalition of labor, environment, and human-rights groups" and wrote that "Showdown in Seattle pulsates with potent sound bites from the vast array of anti-globalization spokespersons and reflects the frantic pace and environment created by the protestors."

In his study of "anarchist filmmakers, videotape guerrillas, and digital ninjas", Chris Robé draws attention to an episode in which an interview is interrupted by two passing WTO delegates, who the cameraperson "abandons [their] well-framed footage" to follow and question, a decision that Robé sees as an example of "the slippage between the space of the film and the space of the political". Robé argues that the cameraperson's questioning of the delegate and the delegate's replies "reveals how the camera serves as an extension of the street actions but in a different modality." Robé notes, however, that "in addition to providing amazing immediate coverage of events and hinting at a new collective subjectivity, Showdown suffers from being firmly lodged at times within a Western, white privileged perspective." This perspective, Robé argues, is evident in the film's depiction of police violence as an unexpected or unusual phenomenon, which he argues is contrary to the experiences of people of color for whom such violence is an everyday occurrence. Robé sees this narrow perspective as a manifestation of "larger racial and class privileges of the alter-globalization movement", and that movement's failure to facilitate "participation by historically disenfranchised communities".

== See also ==
- Guerrilla filmmaking
- 30 Frames a Second: The WTO in Seattle 2000 (2000), a documentary directed by Rustin Thompson
- Battle in Seattle (2007), a political action-thriller film written and directed by Stuart Townsend and based on the 1999 protests
