= Leone and L2 =

Boutiques inside Sinclair Centre, Vancouver, Canada

Leone and L2 were boutiques situated inside the historic Sinclair Centre building, at 757 West Hastings Street, Vancouver, British Columbia, Canada. Founded in 1987 by Maria and Alberto Leone following consolidation of their original boutiques, the store was a popular stop for visiting celebrities.

In 1996, Leone expanded into the lower level of the Sinclair Centre with "L2" which was designed to appeal to younger shoppers and at its peak, the store occupied 25,000 sq. ft. and covered three floors of the building. Leone and L2 were staples in the Vancouver fashion scene and Leone maintained exclusivity in Vancouver as the only licensed carrier of Roberto Cavalli and Versace and are credited with having introduced some high-end brands to the Vancouver market.

Alberto and Maria Leone sold the store in 2015 to Nicole Yang, who focused on the Chinese market. The store announced its closing in early 2020 after downsizing and closing L2 earlier in the year.
