= Paper Tiger Television =

- Formation: 1981; 44 years ago
- Founder: Dee Dee Halleck
- Type: 501(c)(3)
- Location: Brooklyn, New York City, U.S.
- Website: https://papertiger.org

Paper Tiger Television (PTTV) is a non-profit, low-budget public access television program and open media collective based in New York City. PPTV was co-founded by media activist and Academy Award nominated documentary filmmaker Dee Dee Halleck in 1981. It focuses on raising media literacy and exists as a protest to corporate control over broadcast mediums.

Founded to promote freedom of speech and access to means of communication, the volunteer-run non-profit organization is a collective action in response to systems of hierarchical power.

The collective celebrated its 25th anniversary on October 11, 2007 with a premiere of the video Paper Tiger Reads Paper Tiger Television at the Anthology Film Archives. In 2018, in collaboration with Halleck's other collective, Deep Dish Television, Paper Tiger Television released a 10-part video series about resistance to the rise of far-right political movements.

== History ==
Founded in part by Dee Dee Halleck, Paper Tiger Television grew out of the Public-access television series, Communications Update, which ran on Manhattan Cable TV. The first Paper Tiger programs featured communications scholar Herbert Schiller reading the New York Times, the "steering mechanism of the ruling class".

In 1986, Paper Tiger Television created Deep Dish Television, the first grassroots satellite distribution network in the United States. Deep Dish Television distributed the work of independent videomakers, filmmakers, and activists in curated series on a variety of political topics.

== Aesthetic and themes ==
Known for its democratic goals and anti-commercialism agenda, Paper Tiger Television is mainly recognized for incorporating a DIY visual style in its programming. The creators and reporters frequently made use of handmade signs, backdrops, and other unpolished set pieces which had highlighted the grassroots tone of PTTV's videos and drew more attention to the production process. For instance, one of their special live broadcasts begins with a lengthy introduction to PTTV's mission, with the text laid over a brightly colorful backdrop:

"Our lives are increasingly influenced by the large corporations that make and distribute information. Their power rests on false assumptions. This legitimacy is a paper tiger. Investigation into the corporate structure of the media and critical analysis of their methods and meanings can be a way of demystifying the information industry. A critical consciousness about communications is necessary for cultural autonomy and democratic control of information resources."

== Archived programs ==
The archives of Paper Tiger Television house one of the most culturally significant alternative media collections in American history, including critical components of the coinciding technological and artistic evolution of public access television, video art, video activism, and media reform. The complete catalog of over 500 programs can be found at the Paper Tiger Television website.

- Herb Schiller Reads The New York Times: The Steering Mechanism of the Ruling Class, 1981
- Natalie Didn't Drown: Joan Braderman Reads The National Enquirer, 1982
- Tuli Kupferberg Reads Rolling Stone: Always Smile When You Give 'em the Shaft, October 13, 1982
- Bill Tabb Reads US News & World Report: Disrobing the Economy, May 26, 1982
- Martha Rosler Reads Vogue: Wishing, Dreaming, Winning, Spending, Dec, 1982
- Archie Singham Reads Foreign Policy: A Look at the Old Boy's Network, May 4, 1983
- Joel Kovel Reads Life Magazine: It's a New Life, Painting a Corpse, September 21, 1983
- Stanley Aronowitz Reads The New York Times: A Timely Look at Labor, 1983
- Elayne Rapping Swoons to Romance Novels, 1983
- Richie Perez Watches Fort Apache: The Bronx, 1983
- Patty Zimmerman Reads Variety: Hooray for Hollywood, June 20, 1984
- Pearl Bowser Looks at Early Black Cinema: The Legacy of Oscar Micheaux, 1984
- Renee Tajima Reads Asian Images in American Film: Charlie Chan Go Home!, 1984
- Marc Crispin Miller Reads Cigarette Ads: Lots More Ifs, Ands & Butts, 1985
- Jean Franco Reads Mexican Novelas: Adios Machismo! Hola Maquilladora, 1985
- Flo Kennedy Reads U.S. Press on South Africa: The Hair in the Milk, February 1985
- Noam Chomsky Reads The New York Times: Seeking Peace in the Middle East, June 1985
- Thulani Davis Asks, Why Howard Beach?: Racial Violence and the Media, January 21, 1987
- Donna Haraway Reads The National Geographic on Primates, 1987
- Born To Be Sold: Martha Rosler Reads the Strange Case of Baby S/M, 1988
- Fred Landis Reads The Washington Times: The Dark Side of the Moonies, 1989
- Class Dismissed: featuring Howard Zinn and James Loewen, 2004
- Stuart Ewen Reads The New York Post: Fantasy, Morality and Authority, 1982
- Protest + Education Can Equal Change: featuring Kathy High, 1992
- The Last Graduation: The Rise and Fall of College Programs in Prison, 1997

== Cultural impact ==
Since its launch in the early 1980s; Paper Tiger Television has influenced and supported grassroots media activist organizations by providing an innovative model for community media and spurring the global development of a do-it-yourself (DIY) community media movement.

Among viewers, historians, scholars, and creative media makers, the early age of Paper Tiger Television is remembered for its radical political mission and irreverent, ultra-low-budget antics in emphasizing this mission. PTTV's engagement with critiques of mass culture and politics, and providing of innovative leadership for documentary filmmakers, artists, media literacy educators and social justice media movements around the world helped bring more attention to the potential powers of alternative media combined with the rising technology of broadcast television.

Many PTTV programs examine a particular aspect of the communications industry, from print media to TV to movies, seeing its impact on public perception and opinion. Other videos represent the people and views which are largely absent from the mainstream media. Cultural scholar Douglass Rushkoff describes the impact of PTTV as such:

"Perhaps it was the voltage created by the potential difference between what was airing on the networks and what was actually going on around the country that gave Paper Tiger the burst of energy it needed to become a full-fledged force in national television during the Gulf War."

Dee Dee Halleck, one of PTTV's founders, went on to launch Deep TV (now Deep Dish Satellite Network) in 1986, which was the first national independent satellite network.

== See also ==
- Communications Update / Cast Iron TV
- Showdown in Seattle
