= 30 Frames a Second: The WTO in Seattle 2000 =

- Directed by: Rustin Thompson
- Release date: August 20, 2000 (Chicago Underground Film Festival)
- Running time: 73 minutes
- Country: United States
- Language: English

30 Frames a Second: The WTO in Seattle 2000 is a documentary film shot during the WTO Ministerial Conference of 1999 protest activity and contains interviews with many of the protest leaders. It was directed by journalist Rustin Thompson and released in 2000.

== Reception ==
The film won the Gold Jury Award for documentary at the Chicago Underground Film Festival in 2000 and Best Documentary at the Portland Festival of World Cinema in 2001.

== Filming locations ==
- Seattle

== See also ==
- Showdown in Seattle, a 1999 documentary about the WTO protests
