= West Lima, Wisconsin =

West Lima
- Unincorporated community
- Location within the state of Wisconsin
- Coordinates: 43°32′48″N 90°31′50″W
- Country: United States
- State: Wisconsin
- County: Richland
- Time zone: UTC-6 (Central (CST))
  - Summer (DST): UTC-5 (CDT)
- Area code: 608

West Lima is an unincorporated community in the Town of Bloom, Richland County, Wisconsin, United States. The community is located at the intersection of County Highway A and County Highway D.

== History ==
In its heyday West Lima had 700 residents, a teachers' hotel, a brick schoolhouse built in 1920, a post office, a cheese factory, blacksmiths, two milliners, a flour mill, a furniture store, and a hardware store. By the early 1990s its buildings were abandoned and fallen into disrepair. In 1991 several buildings in West Lima were acquired by Xexoxial Endarchy, Ltd., a nonprofit arts and education organization, for use as an intentional community known as Dreamtime Village. The old hotel, with eight rooms and a kitchen, became the home of several permanent residents and temporary housing for guests, who have included Patch Adams and Peter Lamborn Wilson. West Lima remains home to many residents who are not part of Dreamtime Village.
