= Dreamtime Village =

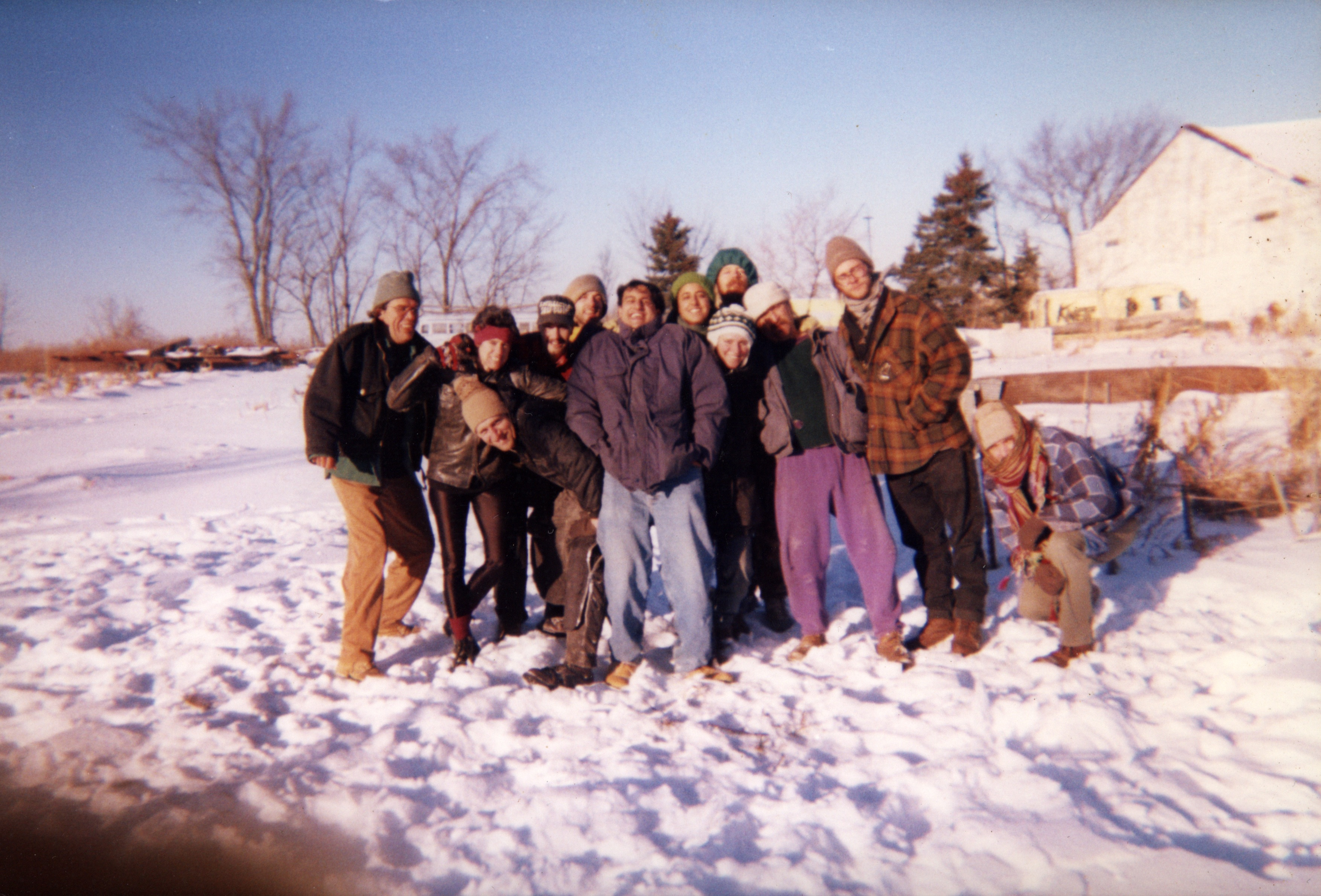
Dreamtime Village residents in the 1990s.

Dreamtime Village is an intentional community in West Lima, Wisconsin, United States, whose residents participate in various permaculture, hypermedia, and sustainability projects. Dreamtime was founded in 1990 by Madison artists mIEKAL aND and Lyx Ish.

== Xexoxial Endarchy and Xexoxial Editions ==
Xexoxial Endarchy is a not-for profit entity that runs Dreamtime Village that also publishes poetry chapbooks under the name Xexoxial Editions. Hakim Bey was one of the writers whose work they published. Xexoxial Editions also produced mail art. Some of their mail art publications are held in the collections of the Museum of Modern Art Library, the Smithsonian Institution Archives of American Art, and the Minneapolis Institute of Art.
