= 1999 Seattle WTO protests =

Series of anti-globalization demonstrations

- Part of the anti-globalization movement
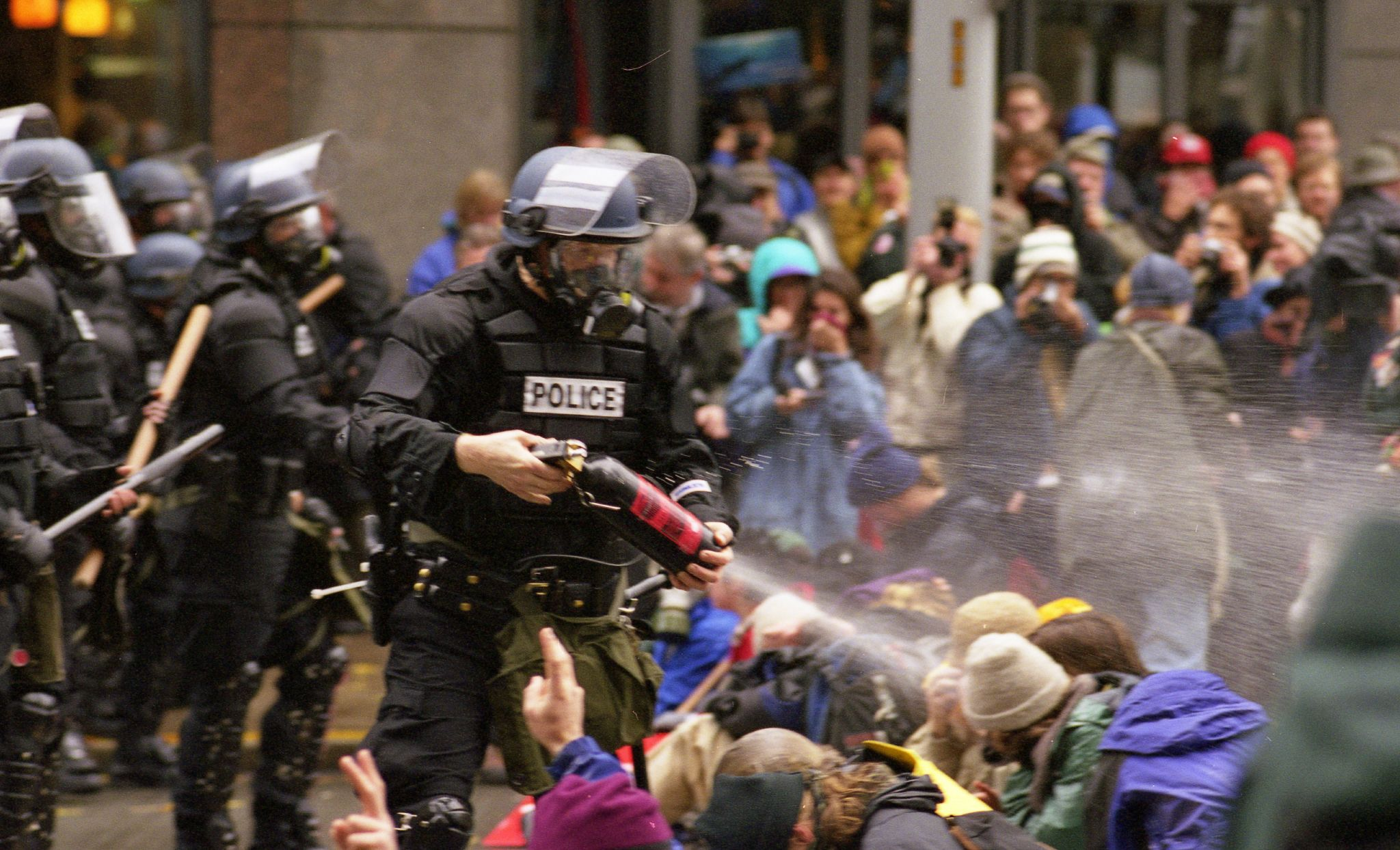
- A police officer sprays pepper spray at the crowd
- Date: November 30 – December 3, 1999
- Location: Seattle, Washington, United States
- Result: Resignation of Seattle police chief Norm Stamper; Increased exposure of the WTO in US media; 157 individuals arrested but released for lack of probable cause or hard evidence; $250,000 paid to the arrested by the city of Seattle; Creation of the Independent Media Center

Parties
Anti-globalization movement Anarchist movement Direct Action Network; NGOs; Labor unions Student and religious groups	(Washington (state)) State of Washington; (Washington (state)) Washington State Patrol; City of Seattle; Seattle Police Department; King County, Washington; King County Sheriff's Office; Washington Army National Guard; 81st Brigade

Number
~40,000	Unknown

The 1999 Seattle WTO protests, sometimes referred to as the Battle of Seattle, were a series of anti-globalization protests surrounding the WTO Ministerial Conference of 1999, where members of the World Trade Organization (WTO) convened at the Washington State Convention and Trade Center in Seattle, Washington on November 30, 1999. The Conference was to be the launch of a new millennial round of trade negotiations.

The negotiations were quickly overshadowed by massive street protests outside the hotels and the Washington State Convention and Trade Center. The protests were nicknamed "N30", akin to J18 and similar mobilizations. The large scale of the demonstrations, estimated at no fewer than 40,000 protesters, dwarfed any previous demonstration in the United States against a world meeting of any of the organizations generally associated with economic globalization, such as the WTO, the International Monetary Fund, and the World Bank.

The protests marked the reappearance of anarchism as a significant force within the Western far left, influenced subsequent social movements by spreading the black bloc strategy and drew widespread international attention to the anti-globalization movement. Locally, they led to the resignation of Norm Stamper, Seattle's police chief.

== History ==
=== Background: Fall of the USSR, rebirth of anarchism, birth of anti-globalization ===
From the 1970s onward, and even more so following the fall of the USSR and the 1990s, the anarchist movement underwent a rebirth in the West. Several factors drove this resurgence, including the evolution of capitalism at the end of the 20th century (offshoring, etc.), the end of state-communist support for Marxist–Leninist parties, and the fact that state-socialist and communist movements were increasingly discredited within the far left.

The anti-globalization movement formed during the same period and was influenced by the anarchists who joined it from the very beginning. Although not all anti-globalists were anarchists, the two movements largely converged; this resulted in the anti-globalization movement adopting anarchist political procedures and practices.

Previous mass demonstrations had taken place in Australia in December 1997, in which newly formed grass-roots organizations blockaded Melbourne, Perth, Sydney, and Darwin city centers.

=== Premises ===
==== Planning ====
Planning for the actions began months in advance and included local, national, and international organizations. Among the most notable participants were national and international nongovernmental organizations (NGOs) such as Global Exchange (especially those concerned with labor issues, the environment, and consumer protection), labor unions (including the AFL–CIO), student groups, religion-based groups (Jubilee 2000), and anarchists (some of whom formed a black bloc). The protests also drew support from some political conservatives, such as American presidential candidate and commentator Pat Buchanan.

The coalition was loose, with some opponent groups focused on opposition to WTO policies (especially those related to free trade), with others motivated by prolabor, anticapitalist, or environmental agendas. Many of the NGOs represented at the protests came with credentials to participate in the official meetings, while also planning various educational and press events. The AFL–CIO, with cooperation from its member unions, organized a large permitted rally and march from Seattle Center to downtown.

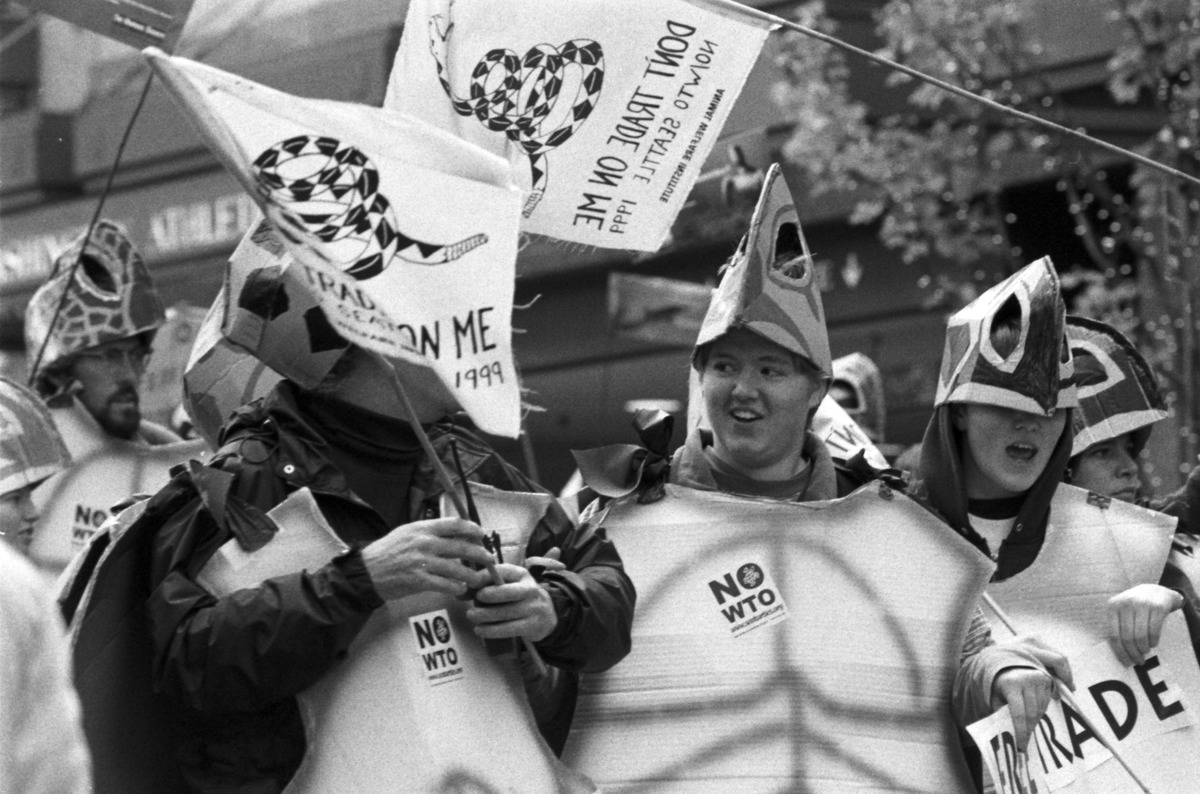
The "turtles": environmentalist protestors in sea turtle costumes

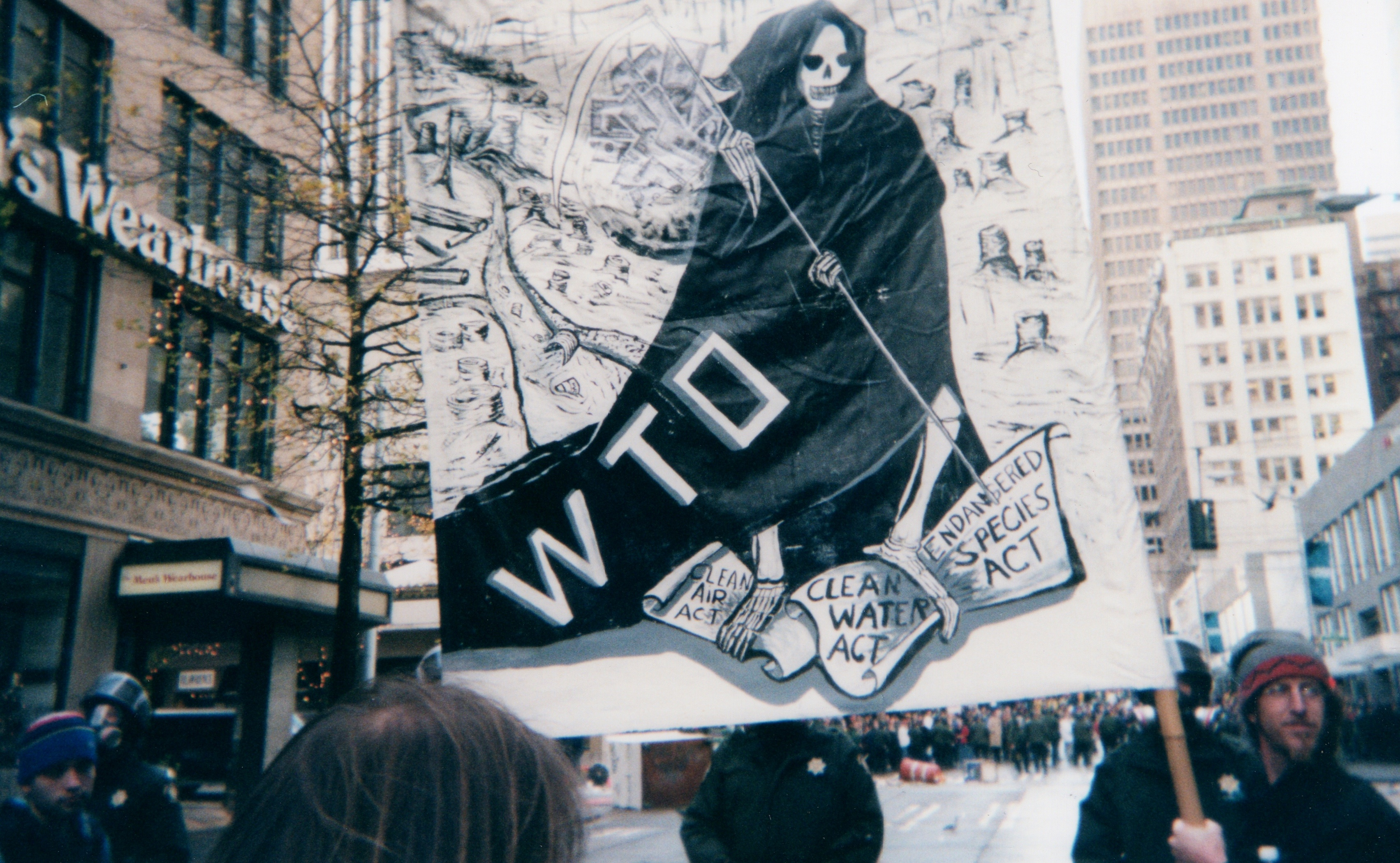
WTO protest sign depicting the organization trampling on three environmental laws

However, others were more interested in taking direct action, including both civil disobedience and acts of vandalism and property destruction to disrupt the meeting. Several groups were loosely organized together under the Direct Action Network (DAN), with a plan to disrupt the meetings by blocking streets and intersections downtown to prevent delegates from reaching the convention center, where the meeting was to be held. The black bloc was not affiliated with DAN, but was responding to the original call for autonomous resistance actions on November 30 issued by People's Global Action.

Of the different coalitions that aligned in protest were the "teamsters and turtles" – a blue–green alliance consisting of the teamsters (trade unions) and environmentalists.

==== Corporations targeted ====
Certain activists, including locals and an additional group of anarchists from Eugene, Oregon (where they had gathered that summer for a music festival), advocated more confrontational tactics, and conducted vandalism of corporate properties in downtown Seattle. In a subsequent communique, they listed the particular corporations targeted, which they considered to have committed corporate crime.

=== Lead-up months ===
On July 12, the Financial Times reported that the latest United Nations Human Development report advocated "principles of performance for multinationals on labour standards, fair trade and environmental protection ... needed to counter the negative effects of globalisation on the poorest nations". The report itself argued, "An essential aspect of global governance is responsibility to people—to equity, to justice, to enlarging the choices of all".

On July 16, Helene Cooper of The Wall Street Journal warned of an impending "massive mobilization against globalization" being planned for the end-of-year Seattle WTO conference. Next day, the London Independent newspaper savaged the WTO and appeared to side with the organizers of the rapidly developing storm of protest:

The way it has used [its] powers is leading to a growing suspicion that its initials should really stand for World Take Over. In a series of rulings it has struck down measures to help the world's poor, protect the environment, and safeguard health in the interests of private—usually American—companies. "The WTO seems to be on a crusade to increase private profit at the expense of all other considerations, including the well-being and quality of life of the mass of the world's people," says Ronnie Hall, trade campaigner at Friends of the Earth International. "It seems to have a relentless drive to extend its power."

On November 16, two weeks before the conference, President Bill Clinton issued Executive Order 13141—Environmental Review of Trade Agreements, which committed the United States to a policy of "assessment and consideration of the environmental impacts of trade agreements" and stated, "Trade agreements should contribute to the broader goal of sustainable development."

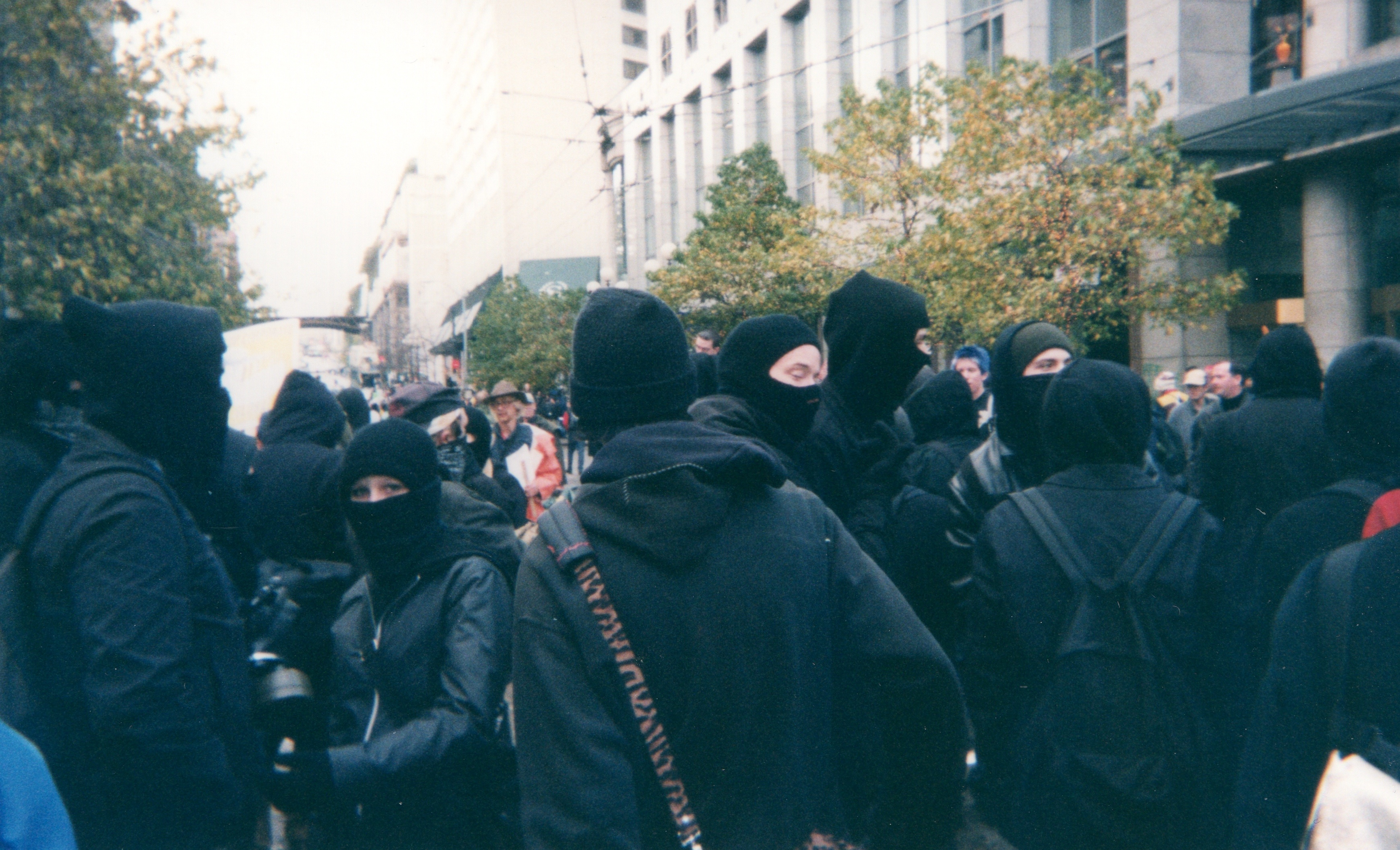
Black bloc organizing during WTO protests

Activists staged a spoof of Seattle daily newspaper the Post-Intelligencer on Wednesday November 24, inserting thousands of hoax editions of a four-page front-page wrap-around into piles of newspapers awaiting distribution to hundreds of street boxes and retail outlets. The spoof front-page stories were "Boeing to move overseas" (to Indonesia) and "Clinton pledges help for poorest nations". The byline on the Boeing story attributed it to Joe Hill (a union organizer who had been executed by firing squad in Utah in 1915). On the same day, the International Centre for Trade and Sustainable Development reported:

developing countries have remained steadfast in their demand that developed countries honour Uruguay Round commitments before moving forward full force with new trade negotiations. Specifically, developing countries are concerned over developed countries' compliance with agreements on market access for textiles, their use of antidumping measures against developing countries' exports, and over-implementation of the WTO Agreement on Trade Related Aspects of Intellectual Property Rights (TRIPs).

=== N30 or the 'Battle' ===
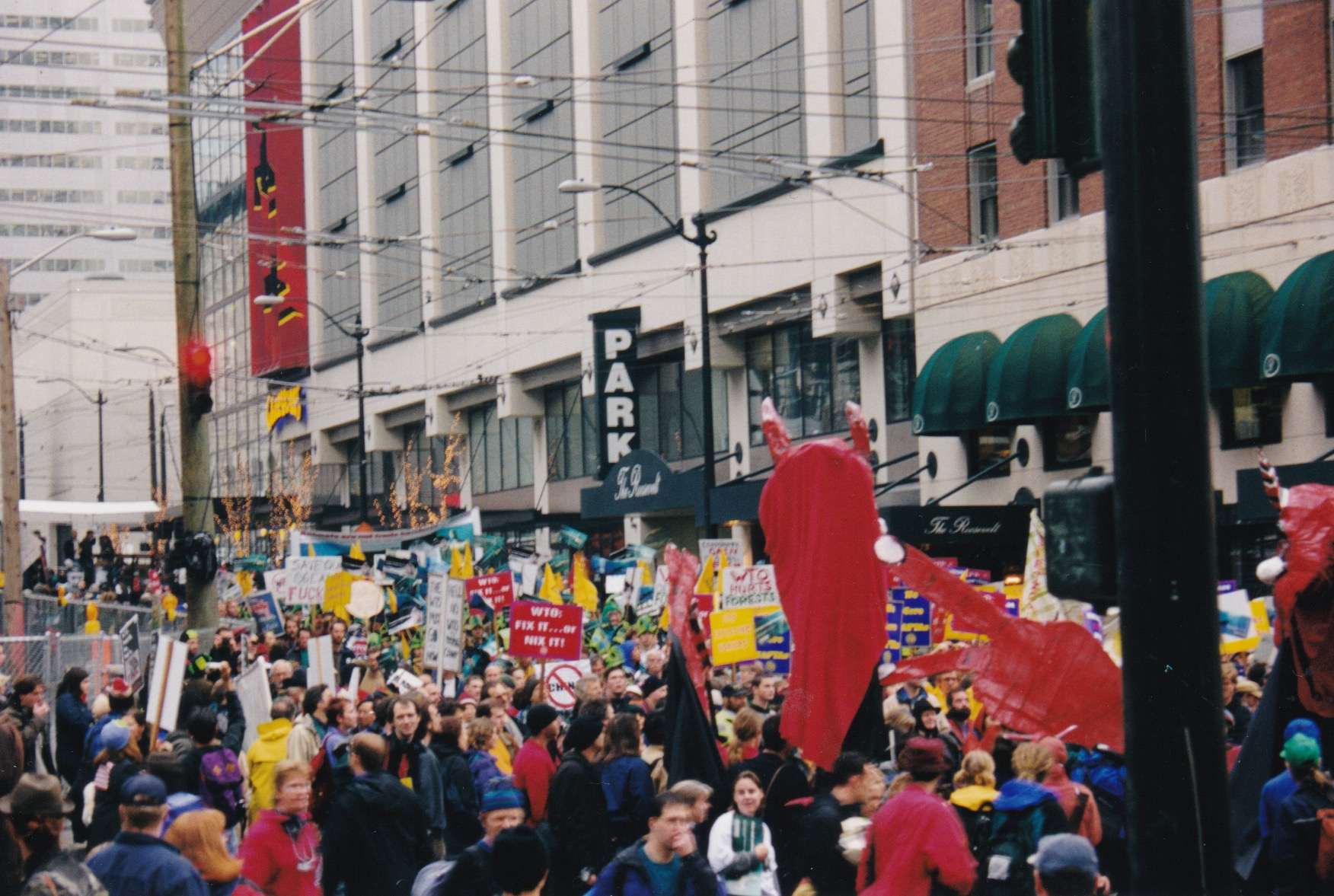
Protesters march against the World Trade Organization, Seattle, November 29, 1999.

On the morning of Tuesday, November 30, 1999, the DAN's plan was put into effect. Several hundred activists arrived in the deserted streets near the convention center and began to take control of key intersections. Over the next few hours, a number of marchers began to converge on the area from different directions. These included a student march from the north, a march of citizens of the developing world who marched in from the south and, beginning around 9:00, militant anarchists (in a formation known as a black bloc) marching down Pike Street from 6th Avenue, blockading the streets with newspaper boxes and smashing windows. Some demonstrators held rallies, others held teach-ins and at least one group staged an early-morning street party. Meanwhile, a number of protesters still controlled the intersections using lockdown formations. An AFL-CIO rally began at 10:00.

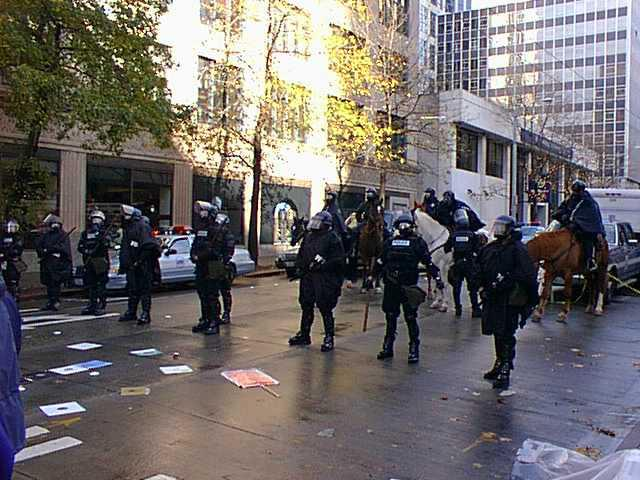
Seattle police on Union Street, during the protests

That morning, the King County Sheriff's Office and Seattle Police Department fired pepper spray, tear gas canisters, and stun grenades at protesters at several intersections in an attempt to reopen the blocked streets and allow as many WTO delegates as possible through the blockade. At 6th Avenue and Union Street, the crowd threw objects back at the police.

By late morning, the black bloc had swelled to 200 people and smashed dozens of shops and police cars. This seems to have set off a chain reaction of sorts, with previously nonviolent protesters throwing bottles at police and joining in the vandalism shortly before noon.

The police were eventually overwhelmed by the mass of protesters downtown, including many who had chained themselves together and were blocking intersections. Meanwhile, the late-morning labor-organized rally and march drew tens of thousands; though the intended march route had them turning back before they reached the convention center, some ignored the marshals and joined what had become a chaotic scene downtown.

At noon, the opening ceremony at the convention center was officially canceled. It took police much of the afternoon and evening to clear the streets. Seattle mayor Paul Schell declared a state of emergency, imposed a curfew, and a 50-block "no-protest zone."

==== December 1 ====
Overnight, the governor of Washington, Gary Locke, called in two battalions of Army National Guardsmen, other law enforcement agencies sent support, and before daylight on Wednesday, troops and officers lined the perimeter of the no-protest zone. Police surrounded and arrested several groups of would-be protesters (and more than one bystander). Beginning at 21:00, a major clash took place on Broadway in the vicinity of Denny Way, involving rocks, bottles, and police concussion grenades. It did not involve a black bloc, but appears to have included local residents, although it is known that many local residents were treated as protesters, even being teargassed, despite having no part in the protests. Police called in from other cities mistook the typically crowded streets of Capitol Hill as groups of protesters. More than 500 people were jailed on Wednesday. Throughout the day, police used tear gas to disperse crowds downtown, although a permitted demonstration organized by the Steelworkers Union was held along the waterfront.

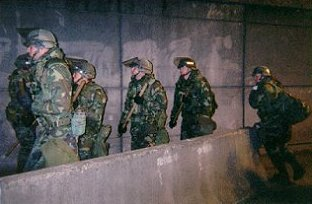
Army National Guardsmen marching to their next assignment

==== December 2–3 ====
Protests continued the following days. Thousands demonstrated outside the Seattle Police Department protesting their tactics and arrests of peaceful protestors. President Clinton arrived and attended the conference. On December 3 the conference ended as delegations were unable to reach agreements, partly in response to the protests. Confrontations with the police continued, albeit at a lower intensity. The primary goal of disrupting the trade talks achieved, some sought the horizons of possibility; it was determined quickly that the necessary ambition to achieve the broader goals of various anarchist factions was not sufficient.

=== Media response ===
The New York Times published false reports that protesters threw Molotov cocktails at police. Two days later, the Times printed a correction saying that the protest was mostly peaceful and no protesters were accused of throwing objects at delegates or the police, but the original error persisted in later accounts in the mainstream media.

The Seattle City Council dispelled the reports with its own investigation findings:

The level of panic among police is evident from radio communication and from their inflated crowd estimates, which exceed the numbers shown on news videotapes. ARC investigators found the rumors of "Molotov cocktails" and sale of flammables from a supermarket had no basis in fact. But, rumors were important in contributing to the police sense of being besieged and in considerable danger.

An article in the magazine The Nation disputed that Molotov cocktails have ever been thrown at an antiglobalization protest within the United States.

Media coverage of the protests condemned the violence of some of the protesters, particularly anarchists, who carried out "symbolic" acts of property damage. Though many denounced the violent tactics used by protesters, this violence resulted in increased media coverage of the event. The WTO meeting had an increase in evening news airtime from 10 minutes and 40 seconds on the first day of the meeting to 17 minutes on the first day of violence. In addition, WTO coverage was the lead or second story on CNN, ABC, CBS, and NBC after violence was reported. Two days after the start of violence, the meeting remained the top story on three of the four networks.

In contrast, the media coverage of subsequent World Bank/International Monetary Fund (WB/IMF) meetings in the spring, which did not involve violence by protests, showed a "pattern that was almost the reverse of that in Seattle"; according to scholars Kevin Michael DeLuca and Jennifer Peeples, this "suggests the crucial role of violence in garnering time on the public screen." The 2001 WTO meeting in Doha, Qatar, also included no reports of violence. As a result, "there was absolutely no TV evening news coverage by the four major networks."

This coverage did not center exclusively on the violence. Instead, details of the protesters' message and antiglobalization campaign were included along with the discussions of symbolic violence taking place. DeLuca and Peeples reported that the violence served as a "dense surface" that opened viewers' and readers' minds to a whole new way of thinking about globalization and corporations' operations.

== Legacy ==
=== A landmark for the rebirth of anarchism in the United States ===
To many in North American anarchist and radical circles, the Seattle WTO riots, protests, and demonstrations were viewed as a success. Prior to the "Battle of Seattle", almost no mention was made of "antiglobalization" in the US media, while the protests were seen as having forced the media to report on 'why' anybody would oppose the WTO.

While anarchism was already reconstituting and growing in the United States in the years leading up to the Seattle protests, this event thrusted the political movement back onto the national and international political and media stage. According to historian Spencer Beswick, the media at the time focused on the role played by black blocs without realizing the underlying and central work anarchists performed to organize the protests and mobilize the population.

=== Exportation of the black bloc strategy ===
The black bloc strategy, which predated the Seattle protests, gained new significance following the event. It was subsequently adopted and exported, a similar protest occurred in Prague in September 2000. Around 12,000 activists gathered to protest during the International Monetary Fund and World Bank summit on September 27, 2000. The black bloc strategy was notably replicated later during the 2001 G8 riots in Genoa. Reflecting on the influence, at least symbolic, of these riots, Francis Dupuis-Déri writes:

For many, the 'Battle of Seattle' marks the simultaneous birth of both the 'anti-globalization' movement and 'black blocs'.

=== Local politics ===
Controversy over the city's response to the protests resulted in the resignation of the police chief of Seattle, Norm Stamper, and arguably played a role in Schell's loss to Greg Nickels in the 2001 mayoral primary election. The massive size of the protest added $3 million to the city's estimated meeting budget of $6 million, partly due to city cleanup and police overtime bills. In addition, the damage to commercial businesses from vandalism and lost sales has been estimated at $20 million.

On January 16, 2004, the city of Seattle settled with 157 individuals arrested outside of the no-protest zone during the WTO events, agreeing to pay them a total of $250,000. On January 30, 2007, a federal jury found that the city had violated protesters' Fourth Amendment constitutional rights by arresting them without probable cause or evidence.

An Ipsos poll taken in the aftermath of the protests indicated that they had little impact on public perception of the WTO within the United States. 19% of respondents said that the protests made them more opposed to the WTO, 11% said the protests made them support the WTO more, and 67% said the protests had no effect on their opinion.

== See also ==
- 1988 IMF/World Bank protests, anti-globalization precursor protest a decade earlier in West Berlin
- 27th G8 summit, a 2001 summit that resulted in anti-globalization protests and similar controversies about police and government response
- Battle in Seattle, a 2007 film loosely based on the protests.
- Electrohippies, an international group of internet activists involved in action against the WTO
- List of incidents of civil unrest in the United States
- Multilateral Agreement on Investment, a draft agreement that failed in 1998
- Showdown in Seattle, a 1999 documentary film about the protests
- 30 Frames a Second: The WTO in Seattle 2000, a 2000 documentary shot during the protests
- Via Campesina, an international movement of peasants' organizations
- Anti-globalization protests in Prague, anti-capitalist protest in Prague (2000)
- Occupy Wall Street
- WTO/99, a 2025 archival documentary film about the protests
