= Indymedia =

Open publishing network of activist journalist collectives

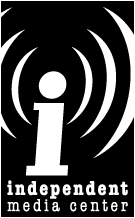
- Logo
- Type: Open publishing
- Format: Online
- Owner: None
- Founded: November 24, 1999; 26 years ago
- Ceased publication: 2010
- Language: English, Spanish, Greek, French, Italian, German, Portuguese, Dutch, Swedish, Finnish, Russian, Polish, Romanian, Hebrew and Arabic
- Headquarters: Various
- Website: indymedia.org

The Independent Media Center, better known as Indymedia, was an open publishing network of activist journalist collectives that reported on political and social issues. Following beginnings during the 1999 Carnival Against Capital and 1999 Seattle WTO protests, Indymedia became closely associated with the global justice movement. The Indymedia network extended internationally in the early 2000s with volunteer-run centers that shared software and a common format with a newswire and columns. Police raided several centers and seized computer equipment. The centers declined in the 2010s with the waning of the global justice movement.

== Content and distribution ==
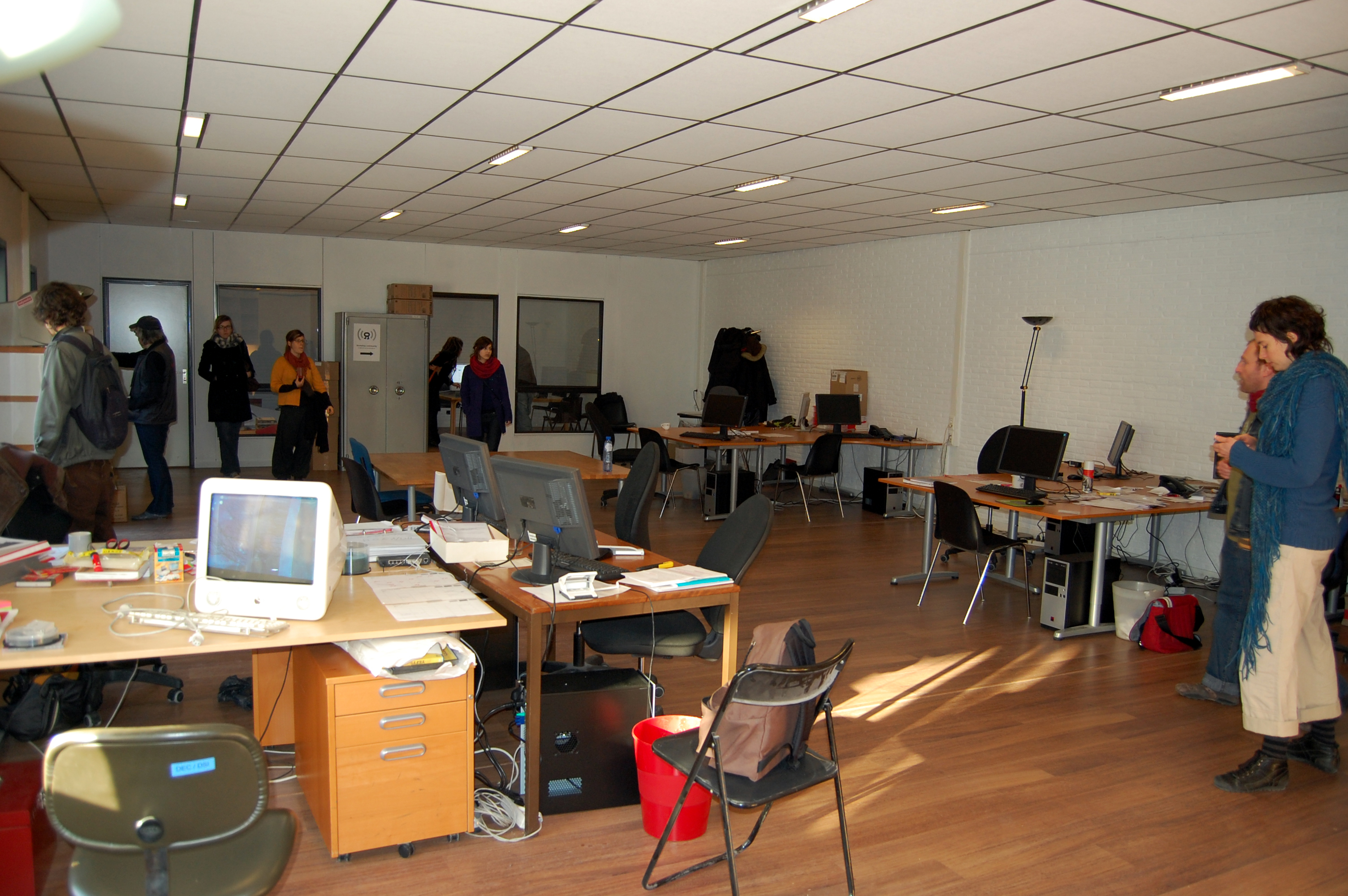
Belgian Indymedia's headquarters in Brussels, Belgium

Indymedia was a website for citizen journalism that promoted activism and countered mainstream media news and commentary perspectives. Indymedia originated from protests against the concentrated ownership and perceived biases in corporate media reporting. The first Indymedia node, attached to the Seattle anti-corporate globalization protests, was seen by activists as an alternative news source to that of the corporate media, which they accused of only showing violence and confrontation, and portraying all protesters negatively. Indymedia initially covered protests between 1999 and 2001. As protests began to wane, Indymedia covered global social justice movements, such as opposition to the war in Iraq. Indymedia was purported to be the first network on-the-scene in reporting the 2008 Greek riots and the resistance towards the 2009 Honduran coup. The network also has a focus in covering the social justice campaigns of students, Indigenous people, immigrants, and peace activists. A slogan was "Don't Hate the Media, Become the Media!"

Active, the software used as the basis for the first Indymedia center websites, was written by activists in Sydney. It went live in January 1999 and featured open publishing, calendars, events and contacts. Indymedia also ran a global radio project which aggregated audio RSS feeds from around the world.

== History ==
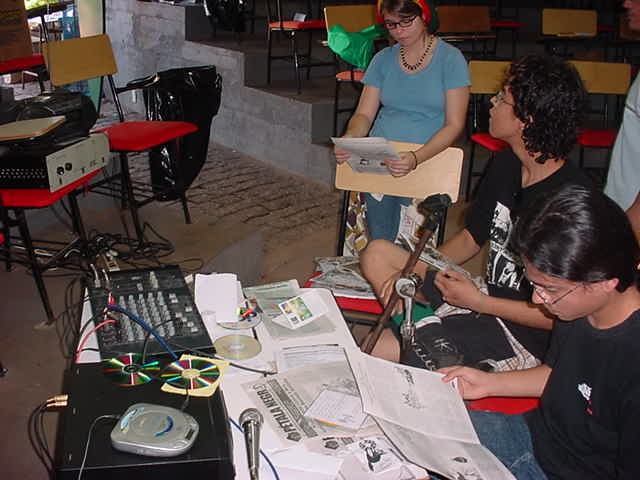
Indymedia collective at Mato Grosso Federal University in Cuiabá, Brazil, hosting a free radio broadcast in 2004

The origins of Indymedia can be traced to the global justice protest Carnival Against Capital, which took place in over forty countries on June 18, 1999. In late November 1999, the first dedicated Indymedia project was ready to cover the 1999 Seattle WTO protests. The first post was made on November 24. It read:

The resistance is global ... The web dramatically alters the balance between multinational and activist media. With just a bit of coding and some cheap equipment, we can set up a live automated website that rivals the corporates'. Prepare to be swamped by the tide of activist media makers on the ground in Seattle and around the world, telling the real story behind the World Trade Agreement.

— Maffew & Manse,

When the protests began, a hundred videographers were on the streets filming, joined by photographers and journalists, all working as volunteers.

After Seattle, local, autonomous collectives formed. Local sociopolitical context determined each individual center's focus. However, it was a core theme that centers would have both an open publishing structure to which anyone could contribute and an open archive. Centers tended to be set up in response to meetings of groups such as the World Bank or G8, to world forum events, or to party conventions, such as Democrat or Republican meetings in the US. By 2002, there were 90 Indymedia websites, mainly in the US, Canada and Western Europe but also Australia, New Zealand and Latin America. The number of centers continued growing, especially in Europe, reaching 142 in 2004 and 175 by 2010.

The Indymedia movement reached its peak in the mid-2000s. Centers in the United States began to atrophy around 2008, and by 2014, the global network had declined significantly, with the number of active sites down to 68. A number of reasons for the decline have been put forward. In February 2013, Ceasefire magazine had noted a decline in the use of Nottingham Indymedia, stating that activist usage of commercial social media had increased. The poverty of activist collectives to invest in resources was contrasted with the massive investments made by corporations such as Facebook and Twitter. In an article published by the journal Convergence Eva Giraud summarised some of the different arguments that had been made by academics and activists, which included informal hierarchy, bureaucracy, security issues including IP address logging, lack of regional engagement, lack of class politics, increase in web 2.0 social media use, website underdevelopment, decline in volunteers and decline in the global justice movement. Corporate Watch saw the rise of social media sites and the normalization of 'open publishing' as recommodifying Indymedia's key innovations for the cultural industry.

In a 2019 article published on occasion of Indymedia's 20th anniversary, April Glaser suggested that factors such as volunteer burnout, lack of resources, lack of centralized accountability, lack of leadership development, and the waning of the anti-globalization movement all contributed to the decline of Indymedia.

== By region ==
=== United Kingdom ===
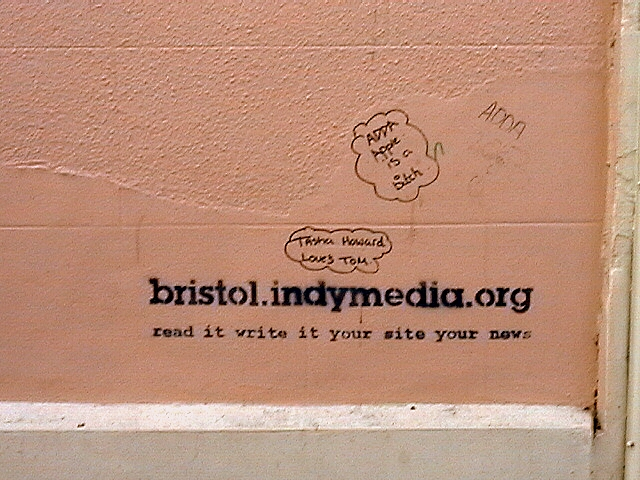
Graffiti in Bristol, United Kingdom, advertising the local chapter of Indymedia with the slogan "Read it, write it, your site, your news"

Police seized servers in the UK in June 2005. An anonymous post on the Bristol Indymedia server came to police attention for suggesting an "action" against a freight train carrying new cars as part of a protest against cars and climate change in the run up to that year's Gleneagles G8 summit. A member of the Bristol Indymedia group was arrested. Indymedia was supported in this matter by the National Union of Journalists and Liberty.

In August 2014, Bristol Indymedia's servers were again seized by police after a string of attacks in the Bristol area were claimed on the Indymedia service, including a communique signed by Informal Anarchist Federation claiming the successful arson of a police firearms training centre. Bristol Indymedia stated that they would not cooperate with the authorities and that they "do not intend to voluntarily hand over information to the police as they have requested".

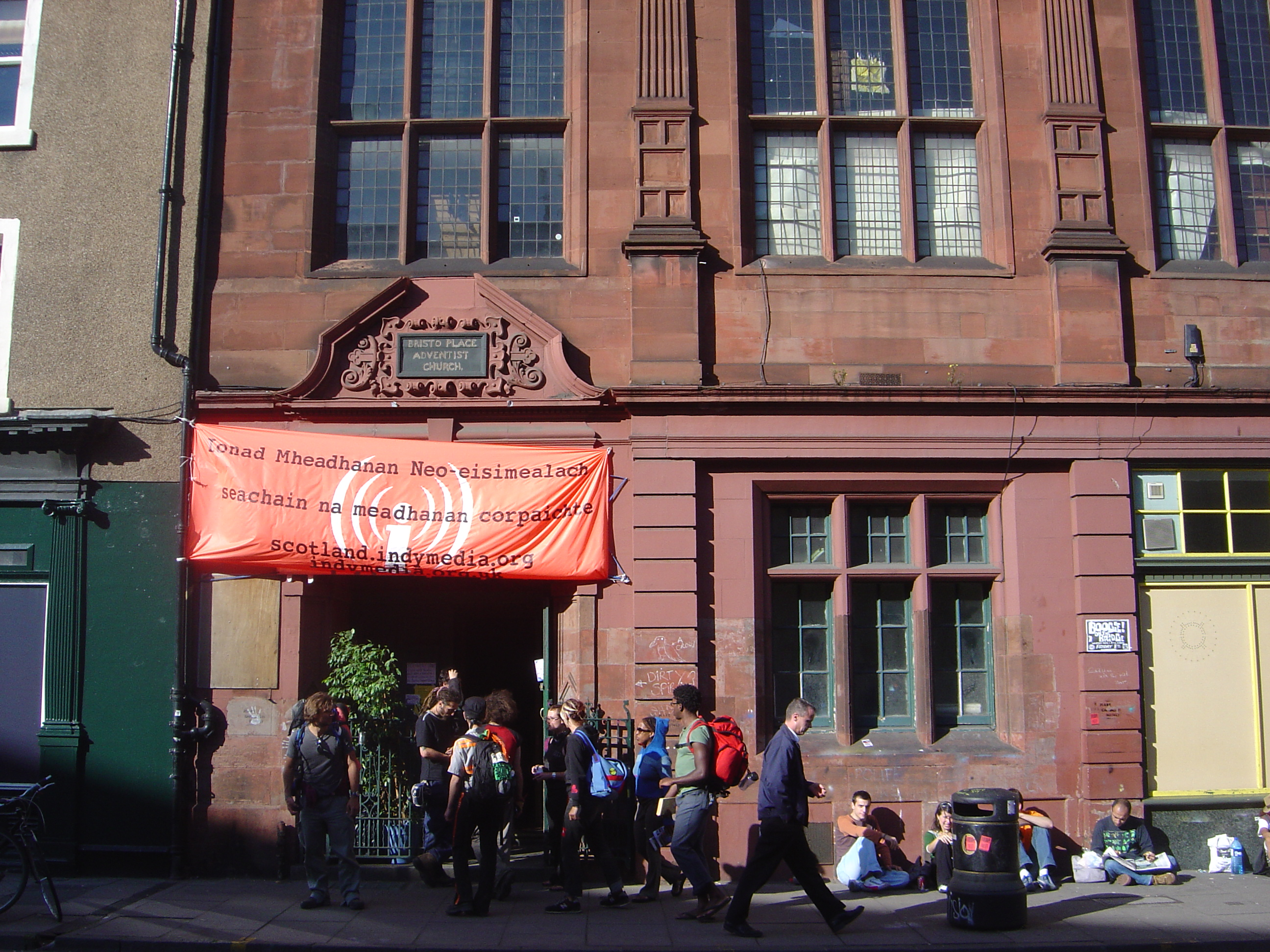
Temporary IMC in Edinburgh covering protests at the 2005 G8 summit

London Indymedia became inactive in July 2016.

=== United States ===
On October 7, 2004, the Federal Bureau of Investigation took possession of several server hard drives used by a number of IMCs and hosted by U.S.-based Rackspace Managed Hosting. The servers in question were located in the United Kingdom and managed by the British arm of Rackspace, but some 20 mainly European IMC websites were affected, and several unrelated websites were affected, including the website of a Linux distribution. Some, but not all, of the legal documents relating to the confiscation of the servers were unsealed by a Texas district court in August 2005, following legal action by the Electronic Frontier Foundation. The documents revealed that the only action requested by the government was to surrender server log files.

The move was condemned by the International Federation of Journalists, who stated that, "The way this has been done smacks more of intimidation of legitimate journalistic inquiry than crime-busting" and called for an investigation. European civil liberties organization Statewatch and the World Association of Community Radio Broadcasters (AMARC) also voiced criticism. EFF attorney Kurt Opsahl compared the case with Steve Jackson Games, Inc. v. United States Secret Service.

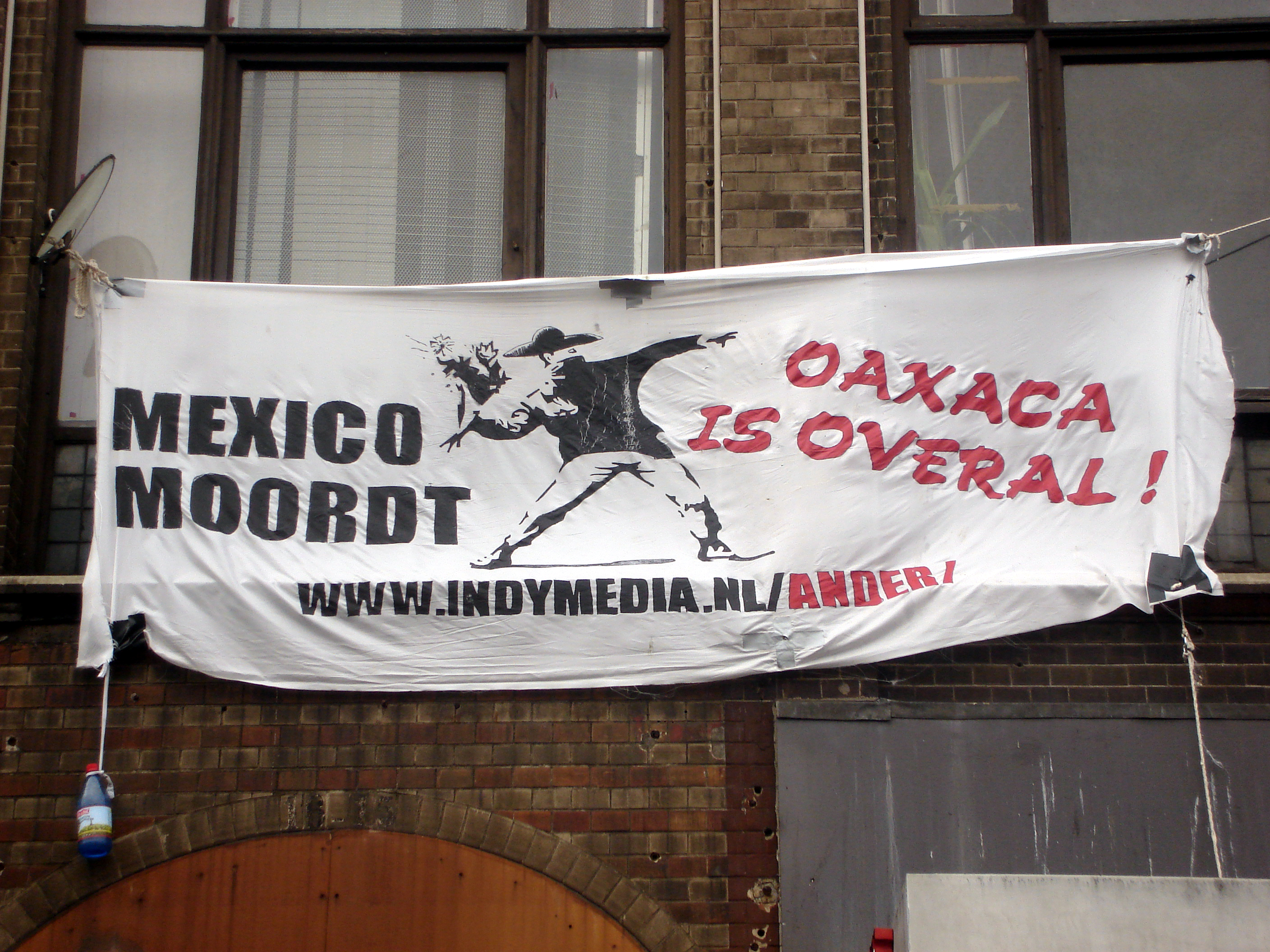
An Indymedia banner protesting the Oaxaca shootings in the Netherlands

New York–based journalist and Indymedia volunteer Bradley Roland Will was killed in October 2006 along with two Mexican protesters in the city of Oaxaca. People had been demonstrating in the city since May as part of an uprising prompted by a teachers strike. Reporters Without Borders condemned the actions of the Mexican government in allowing the accused gunmen to go free.

On January 30, 2009, one of the system administrators of the server that hosts indymedia.us received a grand jury subpoena from the Southern District of Indiana federal court. The subpoena asked the administrator to provide all "IP addresses, times, and any other identifying information" for every visitor to the site on June 25, 2008. The subpoena also included a gag order that stated that the recipient is "not to disclose the existence of this request unless authorized by the Assistant U.S. Attorney." The administrator of indymedia.us could not have provided the information because Indymedia sites generally do not keep IP address logs. The Electronic Frontier Foundation determined that there was no legal basis for the gag order, and that the subpoena request "violated the SCA's restrictions on what types of data the government could obtain using a subpoena." Under Justice Department guidelines, subpoenas to news media must have the authorization of the attorney general. According to a CBS News blog, the subpoena of indymedia.us was never submitted to the Attorney General for review. On February 25, 2009, a United States Attorney sent a letter to an attorney with the Electronic Frontier Foundation stating that the subpoena had been withdrawn.

=== Europe ===
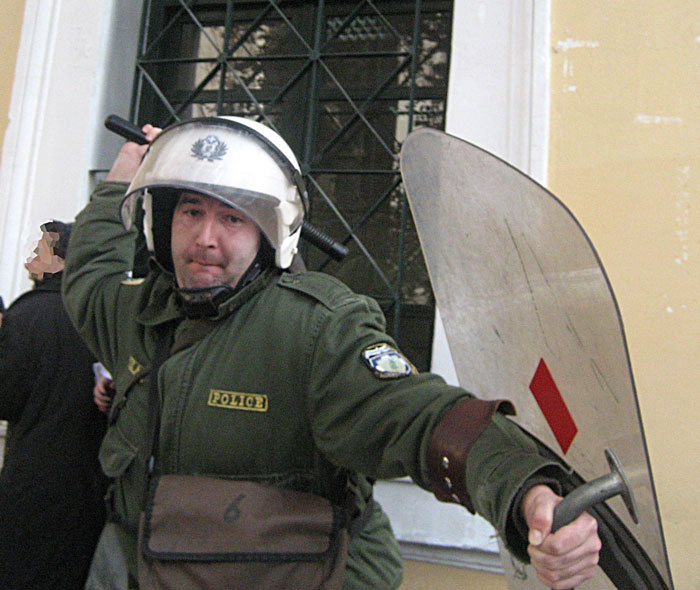
A Greek riot policeman wielding a baton towards an Athens Indymedia photographer during a protest at courts in Athens, Greece

At the 2001 G8 summit in Genoa, Italian police assaulted Indymedia journalists at the Armando Diaz School where Indymedia had set up a temporary office and radio station. Twenty-nine police officers were indicted for beating people, planting evidence and wrongful arrest during the night-time raid. Thirteen were convicted.

In the aftermath of the 2017 G20 Hamburg summit protests, the German Federal Ministry of the Interior, Building and Community banned a chapter of the network called Linksunten. This had been set up in 2008, in southwestern Germany. The ministry described the network as "the central communications platform among far-left extremists prone to violence" and stated that it was used to spread information about violent protest tactics. German internet service providers were ordered to block communication to the website, on which police were referred to as "pigs" and "murderers" and instructions for making Molotov cocktails could be found. The German police also raided the home addresses of several activists in the Baden-Württemberg region, seizing computers and weapons.

== See also ==
- Autistici/Inventati
- Free content
- LocalWiki
- SchNEWS
- Undercurrents (news)
- Showdown in Seattle
