= Peck (surname) =

Peck is a surname which can have two meanings. Either "one who dwells near the foot of a peak" or "one who deals in weights and measures". The name is thought to, but not proven to, originate in the Nottinghamshire/East Midlands England, or Denbighshire in Wales.

== List of people surnamed Peck ==
- Annie Smith Peck (1850–1935), American mountaineer
- Archibald Peck (born 1983), Canadian professional wrestler
- Archie A. Peck (1894–1978), American Medal of Honor recipient
- Arthur Peck (1889–1975), British Royal Air Force officer
- Austin Peck (born 1971), American actor
- Bethuel Peck (1788–1862), New York physician and politician
- Bob Peck (1945–1999), English actor
- Bob Peck (American football) (1891–1932), American football player
- Brian Peck (born 1960), American former actor and convicted sex offender
- Carolyn Peck (born 1966), American women's basketball coach
- Charles Horton Peck, (1833–1917), American mycologist
- Cyrus Wesley Peck (1871–1956), Canadian recipient of the Victoria Cross
- Dale Peck (born 1967), American novelist
- Danielle Peck (born 1978), country-rock singer
- Donald Peck (1930–2022), American flutist
- Edmund Peck (1850–1924), Anglican missionary in Canada
- Sir Edward Peck (British Civil Servant) (1915–2009), British ambassador, climber and author
- Edward Peck (born 1929), United States retired diplomat
- Elisha Peck (1789–1851), American businessman
- Everett Peck (1950–2022), American cartoonist and animator
- Evie Peck, American actress
- Ethan Peck (born 1986), American actor
- Fay Peck (1931–2016) was an American Expressionist artist.
- Francis Peck (1692–1743), British antiquarian
- Gayle Peck, better known as Julie London (1926–2000), American singer
- Ged Peck (1947–2015), British guitarist
- George Peck (disambiguation), several people
- Gordon H. Peck (1857–1921), New York assemblyman
- Gregory Peck (1916–2003), American actor
- Harrison J. Peck (1842–1913), American politician and newspaper editor
- Harry Thurston Peck (1856–1914), American classical scholar
- Ian Peck (born 1957), English cricketer
- J. Eddie Peck (John Edward Peck, born 1958), American actor
- James Peck (disambiguation), several people
- Jamie Peck, British geographer
- Jamie Peck (podcaster), American writer and podcaster
- Jarmila Kukalová-Peck (1930–2024), Czech-born Canadian paleoentomologist
- Jedediah Peck (1748–1821), American educationalist
- Jesse Truesdell Peck (1811–1883), bishop of the Methodist Episcopal Church
- Jim Peck (born 1943), American game show host
- John Peck (disambiguation), several people
- Josh Peck (born 1986), American actor
- Judith Peck, American artist
- Justin Peck (born 1987), New York City Ballet dancer
- Lloyd Peck, British physiologist
- M. Scott Peck (Morgan Scott Peck, 1936–2005), American psychiatrist and author
- Maria Purdy Peck (1840–1914), American civic leader
- Mary Peck, birth name of Mary Butterworth (1686–1775), American counterfeiter
- Mary Gray Peck (1867–1957), American journalist, suffragist, clubwoman
- Maryly Van Leer Peck, university president and founder
- Matt Peck (born 1980), Canadian field hockey goalkeeper
- Nat Peck (1925–2015), American jazz trombonist
- Nicholeen P. Peck, American politician
- Orrin Peck (1860–1921), American painter
- Ralph Brazelton Peck (1912–2008), American Civil Engineer and soil mechanics expert
- Richard Peck (disambiguation), several people
- Robert Peck (disambiguation), several people
- Roxy Peck, American statistics educator
- Russell Peck, American composer
- Terry Peck (1938–2006), a Falkland Islander who aided British forces in the Falklands War
- Theodore S. Peck (1843–1918), Civil War veteran
- Tiler Peck (born 1989), New York City Ballet principal dancer
- Tom Peck (born 1953), American racing driver
- William Peck (disambiguation), several people

== Fictional characters ==
- Mr. Peck, a character in the American sitcom It's Garry Shandling's Show
- Charlie Peck, a character in the 2019 thriller movie The Intruder
- Walter Peck, a character in the 1984 American supernatural comedy movie Ghostbusters

== See also ==
- G. W. Peck, mathematical group pseudonym
- Pieck (surname)
