= Pilot season =

Pilot season may refer to:

- Pilot season (television), the time of year television pilots are often shown.
- Pilot Season (comics), a comic book series from Top Cow Productions.
- Pilot Season (TV series), a six episode 2004 series by Sam Seder.
