= General Peck =

General Peck may refer to:

- DeWitt Peck (1894–1973), U.S. Marine Corps major general
- Hamilton S. Peck (1845–1933), Vermont National Guard brigadier general
- Henry Peck (British Army officer) (1874–1965), British Army major general
- James Stevens Peck (1838–1884), Vermont National Guard brigadier general
- John J. Peck (1821–1878), Union Army major general
- Richard Peck (British Army officer) (born 1937), British Army major general
- Theodore S. Peck (1843–1918), Vermont National Guard brevet major general
- William R. Peck (1818–1871), Confederate States Army brigadier general
