= Digby (blogger) =

American political blogger

Heather "Digby" Parton
- Born: Heather Parton
- Education: San Jose State University
- Occupations: Blogger, journalist

Digby is the short name of American political blogger Heather Parton from Santa Monica, California, who founded the blog Hullabaloo. She has been called one of the "leading and most admired commentators" of the liberal/progressive blogosphere.

Digby began as a commenter on the blogs of Bartcop and Atrios and launched her own blog on January 1, 2003, calling it Hullabaloo "because one function of blogs is to cause a ruckus" and decorating it with a picture of a screaming Howard Beale from the film Network. She has been joined by other bloggers on Hullabaloo, including composer Richard Einhorn, who blogs under the name "Tristero".

Digby graduated from Lathrop High School in Fairbanks, Alaska. She studied theater at San Jose State University (then known as San Jose State College) and worked on the Trans-Alaska Pipeline System and for a number of film companies, including Island Pictures, PolyGram, and Artisan Entertainment.

Digby won the 2005 Koufax award for blog writing and accepted the Paul Wellstone Award on behalf of the progressive blogosphere from the Campaign for America's Future (CAF) at their "Take Back America" conference. Digby had initially kept her identity secret and it was widely assumed that Digby was male until she made an appearance at the 2007 CAF conference to accept the award. Digby has since written regularly at the online tabloid Salon under her given name of Heather Digby Parton. She also won the 2014 Hillman Prize for Opinion and Analysis Journalism.
