= Theodora Agnes Peck =

Female American author and poet from Vermont

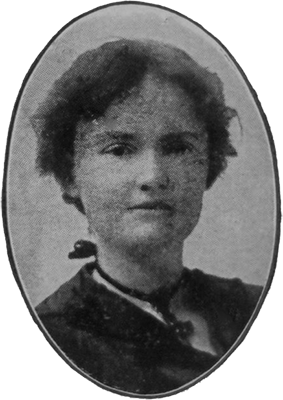
- From the dust jacket of 1914's White Dawn
- Born: Mary Agnes Theodora Peck; October 25, 1882; Burlington, Vermont, US
- Died: January 11, 1964 (aged 81); Burlington, Vermont, US
- Resting place: Lakeview Cemetery (Burlington, Vermont)
- Education: University of Vermont
- Occupations: Author and poet
- Years active: 1900–1964
- Notable work: Hester of the Grants; The Sword of Dundee; White Dawn
- Parent(s): Theodore S. Peck; Agnes Louise Lesslie

Theodora Agnes Peck (October 25, 1882 – January 11, 1964) was an American author and poet from Vermont. She published several historical novels when she was in her twenties and thirties, and her poems were published in magazines, newspapers, and literary journals throughout her life.

== Early life ==
Theodora Agnes Peck was born in Burlington, Vermont on October 25, 1882. An only child, her father was Theodore S. Peck, a recipient of the Medal of Honor during the American Civil War, and her mother was Agnes Louise Lesslie (1843–1917) of Toronto, Ontario, Canada.

Peck attended the public schools of Burlington and graduated from Burlington High School in 1900. She then attended a special non-degree program at the University of Vermont, which she completed in 1904.

== Writing career ==
In 1900, Peck authored the poem "A Dream of the Flag", which she read at several public events. Her poem was subsequently published in Leslie’s Popular Monthly.

In 1905, Peck published her first novel, Hester of the Grants: A Romance of Old Bennington. This endeavor was widely reported on in newspapers nationwide, owing largely to her sex and youth.

Residing temporarily in Scotland provided the inspiration for Peck’s next novel, 1908's The Sword of Dundee: A Tale of Bonnie Prince Charlie. The book that followed was another historical work set in Revolutionary War-era Vermont, 1914's White Dawn: A Legend of Ticonderoga.

Peck continued to write and publish poetry throughout her life. Her work appeared in numerous newspapers, magazines, and literary journals and she was frequently asked to provide readings of her work at veterans’ reunions, memorial dedications, and other public events.

== Affiliations and memberships ==
During her life, Peck maintained membership in several professional and legacy societies, including the Burlington Literary Society, Daughters of the American Revolution, Society of Colonial Dames, and United Daughters of 1812. She was a member of the Athena Club (a women’s service organization) and was active with the Third Order of Saint Francis.

Peck was an honorary member of the Society of the Army of the Potomac, the International Mark Twain Society and the Institute Litteraire et Artistique de France. At age 18, she became the first female honorary member of the Medal of Honor Legion of the United States (now referred to as the Legion of Valor) after being bestowed medal number one of the Second Class.

== Philanthropy ==
Peck was also a philanthropist and benefactor, and her causes included Burlington's Young Men’s Christian Association (YMCA) and Saint Michael's College in Colchester. At her death, her family's home was sold and the proceeds were used to establish the Theodora Agnes Peck Scholarship Endowment at the University of Vermont.

== Death and burial ==
Peck died in Burlington on January 11, 1964. A 1920 convert to Catholicism, her funeral took place at Burlington’s Cathedral of the Immaculate Conception. She was buried at Lakeview Cemetery in Burlington.

Peck never married, and had no children. In July 1963, obituaries for Teresa (or Theresa) C. Egan, who died at age 80, indicated that she had been Theodora Peck's live-in companion for more than 40 years.
