= Matt Bernstein =

Matt Bernstein may refer to:

- Matt Bernstein (internet personality), American makeup artist and activist
- Matt Bernstein (American football), American football fullback

== See also ==
- Mattilda Bernstein Sycamore
