= The Majority Report with Sam Seder =

American talk show

The Majority Report with Sam Seder (2010–present); The Sam Seder Show (2006–2007); The Majority Report with Janeane Garofalo (2004–2006)
- Genre: Politics; news; humor; debate; interview; live call-in
- Format: Audio; video
- Language: English

Cast and voices
- Hosted by: Sam Seder (2006–2007, 2010–present); Co-hosted by Emma Vigeland (2020–present); Also co-hosted by Brandon Sutton (2021–present); Matt Lech (2015–present); Matt Binder (2011–2015, 2020–present); Bryan Vokey (2025–present); Previously hosted by Janeane Garofalo (2004–2006); Previously co-hosted by Russ Finkelstein (2025); Bradley Alsop (2021–2025); Jamie Peck (2017–2021); Brendan Finn (2017–2023); Kelly Carey (2015–2017); Michael Brooks (2012–2020); Sam Seder (2004–2006)

Music
- Opening theme: "Pressure Drop" by The Clash
- Ending theme: "Pilot Light" by Dave Derby

Production
- Length: 120–180 minutes

Publication
- Original release: March 31, 2004 – April 13, 2007; November 2010–present
- Updates: Every weekday

Related
- Website: majorityreportradio.com

The Majority Report with Sam Seder (stylized The Majority Report w/ Sam Seder) is an American progressive internet talk radio program and podcast hosted by Sam Seder. The program focuses on discussing current events and political affairs. The show uses comedy and satire from time to time to make key points. Originally airing on the Air America radio network from March 2004 until July 2006, the show was hosted by Janeane Garofalo, who was originally asked by Air America to host the program and suggested Seder as a co-host.

The Majority Report was associated with the TYT Network, with which the show partnered from the 2010 relaunch until 2020, which generally followed its original format but was rebooted as a viewer-funded production. Following changes in the show's affiliation and funding structure, the show has won a string of international People's Choice Podcast Awards, in five of the next seven annual competitions in 2011, 2012, 2013, 2015, and 2017.

== History ==
The inspiration for The Majority Report radio program occurred on election night 2000, when Sam Seder witnessed via the television media what he perceived as the theft of the presidency by George W. Bush. The name "The Majority Report" refers to Al Gore being "first past the post", a plurality, on the popular vote in the 2000 presidential election in the election as well as a play on the popular 1956 story The Minority Report by Philip K. Dick. In February 2003, Janeane Garofalo (a fellow comedian and longtime friend of Seder) appeared as a guest with Seder on The Best Show on WFMU with Tom Scharpling, a comedy/talk radio program on the New Jersey station WFMU. In the summer of 2003, Garofalo was approached by representatives of Air America Radio to be a radio personality for their programming. She insisted that they hire Seder and that he share the hosting responsibilities. Within a year, on March 31, 2004, The Majority Report with Janeane Garofalo was born, and aired from 8–11 p.m. ET initially, and later in the year the time slot moved up one hour to 7–10 p.m. ET. Regular guests included bloggers Atrios of Eschaton and Bill Scher of LiberalOasis. Journalist Bill Crowley read the hourly news and engaged in a brief discussion at the beginning of each program's third hour, introduced by Ozzy Osbourne's "Mr. Crowley".

Garofalo once said getting on the radio was an early career goal of hers. One early program advertisement read: "The battle to reclaim America from the forces of darkness continues with hosts Janeane Garofalo and Sam Seder." The early days of Air America Radio are chronicled in the documentary Left of the Dial, which includes a debate between Janeane and her conservative father Carmine, who was initially a regular guest on The Majority Report. Garofalo came under fire from her listeners for her comments on her April 28, 2006 show supporting the Scientology-linked "New York Rescue Workers Detoxification Project", a questioned treatment for workers now suffering ailments from 9/11 clean-up efforts in New York City.

=== July 2006: Departure of Janeane Garofalo ===
After months of speculation, Garofalo announced during a broadcast on July 14, 2006, that she would be leaving her co-host position on The Majority Report. On July 19, Garofalo stated that her decision was precipitated by several "unrecoverable" on-air arguments with Seder; she also said that she regards Seder as a better radio broadcaster than she, and therefore a better choice to continue The Majority Report.

Although several reasons for her departure were cited (including her outside acting responsibilities, which made her largely absent from The Majority Report for several weeks prior), the relationship between Garofalo and co-host Seder had become increasingly strained, owing largely to Garofalo's promotion of the above-mentioned Scientology-linked treatment program for firefighters and rescue workers in New York City. On June 2, Garofalo responded to Seder's opposition, suggesting that he would not have a problem with the program if it were linked to Jews rather than Scientologists. Seder, who is Jewish, and his producer walked off the set in angry protest.

Garofalo's long stint on the final season of the NBC drama The West Wing (as Louise Thornton, media strategist for Jimmy Smits' character, presidential candidate Matt Santos) did not allow her to be in New York to co-host The Majority Report for several weeks; this allowed Seder to make the program his own, and she acknowledged that this had a part to play in her decision to leave. She mentioned that Seder was her favorite available choice for co-host when she was approached by Air America for the radio show; her first choice (as she said in obvious jest) was her favorite actor, Steve McQueen, who has been deceased for many years. Her last broadcast as co-host of The Majority Report aired on July 21, 2006.

Garofalo returned to the show occasionally, performing as Senator Katherine Harris, a comedic/satirical impersonation of Republican Katherine Harris, former Florida Secretary of State and Representative for FL-13.

=== September 2006: The Sam Seder Show ===
In September 2006, the original radio show ended its run. Seder, hosting by himself, then began a new mid-morning program on Air America Radio, The Sam Seder Show, in the time slot previously occupied by Jerry Springer (which was also the lead-in to The Al Franken Show). The show retained many of the elements of the original Majority Report. Seder aired The Sam Seder Show's final broadcast on Friday, April 13, 2007.

=== November 2010: Reboot and distribution model ===
In November 2010, Seder re-launched the show as The Majority Report with Sam Seder, a self-produced independent online podcast. The format closely matched the previous Air America program (even using some of the same recorded intro announcements and bumper music), with politically oriented commentary by Seder and interviews with various guests; Garofalo participated occasionally as a guest, and Cliff Schecter, co-author of The Real McCain with Marcia Mitchell, was often a guest as well, usually on Fridays. The Majority Report streams live Monday–Friday at 12 p.m. ET on their website and various other platforms. Seder began offering premium subscriptions to listeners (via the show's re-launched website) to help with production expenses (following the business model of Mike Malloy when his program became self-syndicated, and that of Cenk Uygur of The Young Turks); which allows subscribers access to expanded commentary not on the basic podcast. On the re-launched website, Seder also offered DVDs of the 2004 TV series Pilot Season, produced and directed by Seder, starring Sarah Silverman and originally broadcast on the now-defunct Trio cable channel. Producer/Contributors Michael Brooks and Matt Binder began co-hosting M&M Mondays in 2013. Binder left the show in October 2015 to work for the new Internet startup, CAFE. Later that month, Matt Lech and Kelly Carey were added as producers. In September 2017, Kelly Carey departed to work for TYT Politics, and Jamie Peck along with Brendan Finn were hired as producers later in October.

=== July 2020: Death of Michael Brooks ===
On July 20, 2020, co-host Michael Brooks died at the age of 36 due to a "sudden medical condition," later revealed to be an undetected thrombosis in his neck. Following Brooks' death, an extended Majority Report episode was held allowing for previous guests, Majority Report contributors, and callers to mourn and remember Brooks. Seder announced that The Majority Report would be off the air for one week following Brooks' passing.

=== Fall 2020–2025: Personnel changes and other developments ===
In October 2020, it was announced that Emma Vigeland, formerly a contributor for The Young Turks, would assume Brooks' position as co-host and producer. Her first appearance took place on November 3, 2020, the date of the 2020 presidential election. In November 2020, a one-hour version of the show began airing on the NBCUniversal streaming service Peacock, however, the show's contract with Peacock ended in November 2021 and it was not renewed.

In March 2021, Jamie Peck announced that she would be leaving the show. In June 2021, Brandon Sutton announced that he would be co-hosting The Majority Report on Thursdays going forward. In July 2021, it was announced that producer Brendan Finn would be leaving the show to return to school to study health policy. Following Finn's departure, Bradley Alsop joined The Majority Report as a producer.

In September 2022, Vigeland and Alsop launched the ESVN Show (short for Emma Sports Vigeland Network, a parody of ESPN), a podcast covering sociopolitical issues in the sports world through a progressive lens. The ESVN Show has been on hiatus since June 2025.

In March 2025, Alsop announced he would be leaving the show. Producer Russ Finkelstein had a two-month stint on the show from April to June 2025. Shortly afterwards, Bryan Vokey joined the show as a producer.
