= MWO =

MWO may refer to:

- Master warrant officer, a military rank in the Canadian Forces
- Max Watts Out, a non-standard unit of power rating, aka Units Watts Out (UWO)
- MechWarrior Online, a vehicular combat video game
- Media Whores Online, a defunct left-wing blog
- Meyer–Womble Observatory, an astronomical observatory near Mount Evans, Colorado, USA
- Middletown Regional Airport, (IATA: MWO, ICAO: KMWO, FAA LID: MWO)
- Military William Order, or named Military Order of William, the oldest and highest honour of the Netherlands
- Mount Washington Observatory, a scientific and educational institution with a weather observation station at Mount Washington in New Hampshire
- Mount Wilson Observatory, an astronomical observatory in Los Angeles County, California, USA
