= Friedman (disambiguation) =

Friedman and Freedman are surnames. They may also refer to:

- Friedman Memorial Airport, public airport in Hailey, Idaho
- Friedman (unit), a neologism named after columnist Thomas L. Friedman
