= Michael Brooks (political commentator) =

American talk show host (1983–2020)

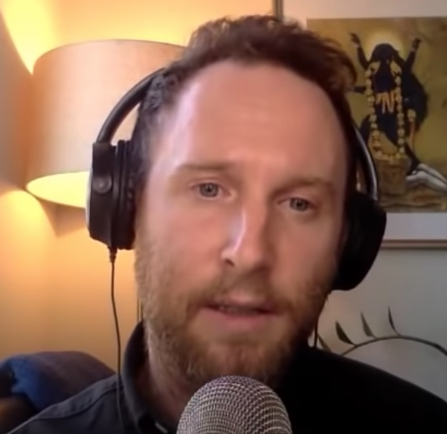
- Brooks on Novara Media in March 2020
- Born: Michael Jamal Brooks; August 13, 1983
- Died: July 20, 2020 (aged 36)
- Education: Bates College
- Occupations: Political commentator; talk show host; producer; YouTube personality; podcaster; writer
- Years active: 2011–2020
- Notable work: Against the Web: A Cosmopolitan Answer to the New Right (2020)

YouTube information
- Channel: The Michael Brooks Show
- Years active: 2018–2020
- Genres: Politics; opinion; comedy
- Subscribers: 138 thousand
- Views: 30 million
- Last updated: December 7, 2025

Michael Jamal Brooks (August 13, 1983 – July 20, 2020) was an American talk show host, writer, left-wing political commentator, and comedian. While co-hosting The Majority Report with Sam Seder, he launched The Michael Brooks Show in August 2017 and provided commentary for media outlets, making regular appearances on shows such as The Young Turks. Brooks contributed to various publications, including HuffPost, The Washington Post, Al Jazeera, openDemocracy, and Jacobin. His book Against the Web: A Cosmopolitan Answer to the New Right was published by Zero Books in April 2020.

Brooks was a self-identified progressive, internationalist, democratic socialist, and Marxist humanist. He commented extensively on U.S. foreign policy, the Middle East, Latin America, capitalism, and the intellectual dark web.

== Early life and education ==
Michael Jamal Brooks was born on August 13, 1983, to Donna Brooks and Glenn Brooks, and grew up in Hampshire County, Massachusetts. He had a younger sister, Lisha.

Brooks became involved in radical politics at a young age, joining the Northampton-based Revolutionary Anarchist Youth (RAY) at 11. He also developed an interest in Buddhism, involving himself with the Insight Meditation Society and regularly participating in annual weeklong silent retreats.

Brooks attended North Star Self-Directed Learning for Teens and the Pioneer Valley Performing Arts Charter Public School. He was accepted to the London School of Economics, but chose not to go. He attended Bennington College for a year before transferring and earning a Bachelor of Arts degree in political science from Bates College in 2009. Brooks spent his junior year abroad studying European and Turkish security studies at Middle East Technical University in Ankara, Turkey.

== Career ==
Brooks began his career in comedy and meditation, founding the Valley Arts Project and coaching seminars at Sati Solutions. In 2011 he co-authored a meditation guide, The Buddha's Playbook, with Josh Summers. His early journalism and hosting work include his contributions to CivicActions, Talking Points Memo, and The David Pakman Show. On returning to New York City in 2012, Brooks met Sam Seder and began working for The Majority Report with Sam Seder. Along with his colleagues, Brooks criticized MSNBC for firing Seder over a tweet that he had made in 2009. Brooks hosted INTERSECTION for Aslan Media and was an analyst for the American Iranian Council.

Brooks was known for his mixture of political analysis with comedy. Bhaskar Sunkara said, "Michael could 'get away' with controversies because of how he mixed his comedy with earnestness." Seder said, "[W]hat was unique about Michael was not just his intelligence and insight into politics, particularly foreign politics, but his ability to do genuinely brilliant political comedy."

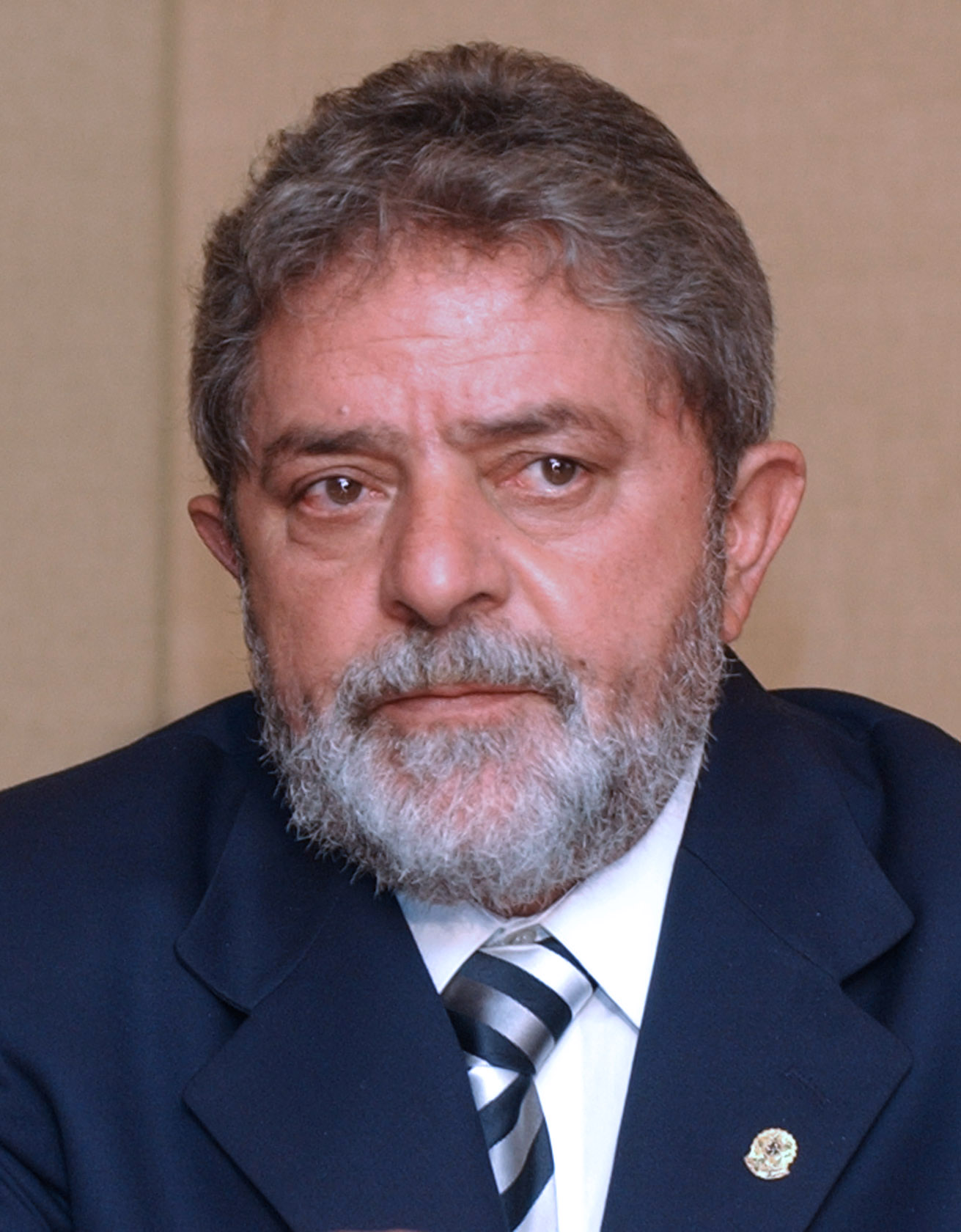
Brazilian President Lula da Silva was a personal hero of Brooks.

A large part of Brooks's political comedy was his impressions of political figures and commentators such as Barack Obama, Nelson Mandela, and Dave Rubin.

Brooks began co-hosting 2 Dope Boys and a Podcast in 2016 and announced in 2017 that he was starting The Michael Brooks Show. The podcast, which was broadcast live on tour from a variety of venues around the United States, reached 131,000 subscribers. It included interviews with Noam Chomsky, Cornel West, Adolph Reed, and Slavoj Žižek. Having first heard of Brazilian president Lula da Silva in 2003, Brooks began reading BrasilWire every day during Operation Carwash and the Lula Livre movement in order to deliver updates to viewers. In January 2020, he traveled to São Paulo to interview Lula alongside BrasilWire editors Daniel Hunt and Brian Mier. Brooks also wrote the foreword to the 2018 book Year of Lead: Washington, Wall Street and the New Imperialism in Brazil, also by Hunt and Mier, which documents the rise of Jair Bolsonaro in Brazil.

From April 2020 until his death, Brooks co-hosted a YouTube show called Weekends with Ana Kasparian and Michael Brooks, a collaboration with Jacobin. At the time of his death, Jacobin was planning to launch a second weekday webcast, The Jacobin Show, with Brooks as host.

Brooks contributed to various publications, including HuffPost, The Washington Post, Al Jazeera, In These Times, Good Worldwide, Al-Monitor, openDemocracy, Jacobin and Jadaliyya. He appeared on various networks and shows around the world such as The Young Turks, HuffPost Live, Al Jazeera English, France 24, Novara Media, CCTV, Rising and Hear the Bern, the Bernie Sanders 2020 presidential campaign's podcast.

== Writings ==
=== Against the Web ===
On April 24, 2020, Brooks's book Against the Web: A Cosmopolitan Answer to the New Right was published. The book is a critique of the popular figures associated with the intellectual dark web. It also argues that a focus on deplatforming has harmed the left's ability to organize, drawing upon Mark Fisher's essay "Exiting the Vampire Castle" (2013). It argues against essentialist thinking on the right and the left, and advocates a "cosmopolitan socialism" that is "open to all cultures and ... embrace[s] and encourage[s] cultural exchange and syncretism" as an alternative. In Jacobin, Luke Savage called the book a "model blueprint for countering the reactionary narratives ascendant in the smoldering ruins of the neoliberal order." In UnHerd, James Bloodworth called the book "the most substantial critique of the IDW and its brand of 'classical liberalism' to date."

=== Essays ===
Brooks was the author or co-author of several dozen published essays in outlets and magazines including Al Jazeera, Salon, and Jacobin magazine. Some of his published essays are:

- "US Reparations for Iraq Are Long Overdue" (Al Jazeera, November 2013)
- "Bill Maher Makes Us Dumber: How Ignorance, Fear and Stupid Pop-Culture Clichés Shape Americans' View of the Middle East" (Salon, March 2017)
- "The American AKP" (Jacobin, July 2017)
- "Selahattin Demirtaş Is Not a Terrorist" (Jacobin, December 2018)
- "How Bernie Sanders Should Talk About Venezuela and US Intervention in Latin America" (Jacobin, September 2019)
- "The Annihilation of Rojava" (Jacobin, October 2019)
- "Turkey's War on Rojava" (Tribune, October 2019)
- "Bernie Has Called to Free Lula. Why Won't the Rest of the Democratic Field?" (Jacobin, October 2019)
- "Ilhan Omar and the Turkey Question" (Jacobin, November 2019)
- "It's Good That Joe Rogan Endorsed Bernie. Now We Have to Organize." (Jacobin, January 2020)
- "After Bernie" (Tribune, April 2020)
- "Michael Brooks on Why the War on the Poor Must End" (Published posthumously by Jacobin, July 2021)

== Political views ==
In progressive circles, Brooks is remembered for saying "we must be ruthless to institutions and systems but kind and empathetic to people".

=== New Atheism ===
Brooks had no universal criticisms of atheism in general, but was critical of the main public figures associated with New Atheism, such as Sam Harris, Christopher Hitchens, and Richard Dawkins. For instance, Brooks found Harris's view of Islam ahistorical and one-dimensional. He criticized Hitchens's political shift to neoconservatism in his later years, but still approved of aspects of his politics, such as his criticisms of former U.S. Secretary of State Henry Kissinger.

=== Intellectual dark web ===
Brooks was critical of the intellectual dark web and people associated with the group, including Sam Harris, Jordan Peterson, Dave Rubin, and Ben Shapiro. He believed such people were "fixated on justifying hierarchies that are... socially, politically produced, and then not wanting to look at the reason why things have come in to play". Brooks wrote that Peterson is a "charlatan" and that "[people like Peterson] talk as if they're being persecuted by the all-powerful Intolerant Left while they hold down a tenured position at a prestigious university".

=== Israeli–Palestinian conflict ===
So it's not a complex issue. That's the big thing. It's super simple. There's one group [Israel] that has enormous power. It's the most powerful country in the Middle East. It's backed by the United States. It acts on another population of people with total impunity. It is never held accountable for anything. So, there's no symmetry in the relationship, period.

— Michael Brooks

Brooks was critical of the Israeli government's handling of the Israeli–Palestinian conflict. He called Israel an "apartheid state" and said, "My Jewish values teach me to oppose apartheid". Brooks opposed Israeli settlements, the Israeli occupation of the West Bank, and Israel's military operations in the Gaza Strip. He also condemned Hamas for killing and targeting civilians. Brooks believed that the two-state solution to the conflict was a "dead, discredited process".

In 2019, Brooks praised presidential candidate Bernie Sanders for saying on Pod Save America that he would use U.S. aid as leverage to get the Israeli government to act differently. He criticized presidential candidate Andrew Yang for saying he would not use U.S. aid to Israel as leverage. Brooks defended Representative Ilhan Omar after she was accused of antisemitism due to her criticism of Israel.

After the September 2019 Israeli legislative election, Brooks expressed support for the Israeli political alliance the Joint List, saying that it was "the only vehicle for pure democracy in Israel and Palestine that's electoral".

=== Syrian civil war ===
Brooks argued that Turkey's response to the Syrian civil war under Recep Tayyip Erdogan was partly an effort to erase Kurdish culture in northern Syria. He showed support and solidarity with the Kurds, praising the socialistic, progressive aspects of their political culture.

== Death and tributes ==
On July 20, 2020, Brooks died from what was initially only described as a "sudden medical condition" at the age of 36. On The Majority Report, Brooks's sister, Lisha, reported the cause of death was a blood clot. The statement indicated that a foundation dedicated to his work would be forthcoming.

Tributes were paid to Brooks by his Majority Report and Michael Brooks Show colleagues, as well as a range of political commentators from other platforms. Former and future President of Brazil Lula da Silva, a personal hero of Brooks's, expressed his condolences, writing on Twitter: "My heart and prayers go to his family and friends. May his passion for social justice be remembered and inspire people around the world." Jane Sanders, wife of Senator Bernie Sanders, wrote that Brooks's "work on behalf of justice, humanity, and peace and his compassionate intelligence was impressive. It will live on through many he inspired." Cornel West said of Brooks, "he's got a soulfulness about him, and that soulfulness is not just the sharing of a soothing sweetness against the backdrop of a sensitivity of catastrophe, but it's also Socratic, it's deeply self-critical, he's willing to muster the courage to scrutinize himself... that's where his sense of the comic comes from, that he doesn't take himself so seriously that he can't also open himself up to the ways in which he has been shaped by some of the very things he's critical of." Marianne Williamson wrote, "We lost a real light today. Gratitude for what he gave all of us and blessings on his journey forward."

Brooks's replacement on The Majority Report was Emma Vigeland, formerly of The Young Turks, in November 2020.

After Brooks's death, The Michael Brooks Show continued airing over 20 episodes with producers Matt Lech, David Griscom and Michael's sister Lisha Brooks. On November 24, 2020, the team announced that the weekly show would end and that the final months of the show would be a series of panels and round table discussions in honor of Brooks and his work with intellectual scholars, guests and friends.

Matt Lech and David Griscom launched a new show, Left Reckoning, while Lisha and the Brooks family launched The Michael Brooks Legacy Project, turning The Michael Brooks Show's YouTube channel into a public commons for education and left voices. In 2021, Lisha Brooks launched a YouTube show and podcast about her brother's life and work called "The Brief and Wondrous Life of Michael Brooks." The Young Turks posthumously named Brooks "Turk of the Year".

== Bibliography ==
- Brooks, Michael; Summers, Josh (2011). The Buddha's Playbook: Strategies for Enlightened Living. ISBN 978-0-55720-190-7.
- Brooks, Michael (2020). Against the Web: A Cosmopolitan Answer to the New Right. London: Zero Books. ISBN 978-1-78904-230-6.
