= James Peck =

James Peck may refer to:

- James H. Peck (1790–1836), American judge in Missouri impeached for abuse of power
- James Peck (artist) (born 1968), artist and writer born in the Falkland Islands
- James Peck (athlete) (1880–1955), Canadian athlete at the 1904 Summer Olympics
- Sir James Peck (civil servant) (1875–1964), British civil servant and local government officer
- James Peck (pacifist) (1914–1993), pacifist, radical journalist, and civil rights advocate
- James Peck (pilot) (1912–1996), African-American aviator who served as a pilot in the Spanish Republican Air Force
- James Stevens Peck (1838–1884), Vermont attorney and military leader
- Jim Peck (born 1939), American television and radio personality

== See also ==
- Peck (surname)
- James Peckham (c. 1346 – 1400), English politician
