= Bill Scher =

American pundit

- Born: September 26, 1972 (age 54); New York City, U.S.
- Education: Oberlin College
- Occupations: Writer, Television Host
- Years active: 2002—present

Bill Scher (born September 26, 1972) is an American pundit and liberal political analyst. He is the Politics Editor for the Washington Monthly. He also is a Contributing Editor to POLITICO Magazine, and a contributor to RealClearPolitics. He also co-hosts "The DMZ," an online TV show with conservative pundit Matt Lewis on YouTube. Scher is an alumnus of Oberlin College.

== Early career ==
Bill Scher founded LiberalOasis.com in 2002. In 2004, he became a regular commentator for Air America Radio's The Majority Report hosted by Sam Seder and Janeane Garofalo. In 2006, he contributed a chapter to the book Proud To Be Liberal and published his own book Wait! Don't Move To Canada!: A Stay-and-Fight Strategy to Win Back America (Rodale, 2006). He later became an editor and writer for the Campaign for America's Future website OurFuture.org.

== Positions ==
Scher has been known to take positions that are controversial within liberal circles. In 2012, he published an op-ed in The New York Times titled "How Liberals Win" which argued that liberals should treat "corporate power as a force to bargain with, not an enemy to vanquish". After the Edward Snowden leaks, he defended the record of the National Security Agency from a liberal perspective in essays for The Week and POLITICO Magazine. He defended his position in an appearance on MSNBC's The Last Word with Lawrence O'Donnell and later in a debate with Snowden's attorney Ben Wizner on MSNBC's Up with Steve Kornacki. He wrote articles critical of Bernie Sanders throughout the 2016 presidential primaries.
