= Coppage =

Coppage is a surname. Notable people with the surname include:

- Al Coppage (1916–1992), American football player
- Terrence R. Coppage (1953–2014), American blogger
- Walter Coppage, American actor

== See also ==
- Coppage v. Kansas, a US Supreme Court case based on US labor law
