= William Wells (general) =

American military figure and politician

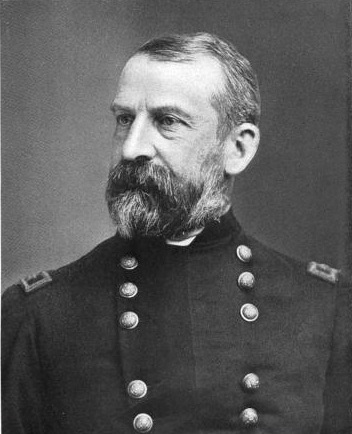
- William Wells, Medal of Honor recipient
- Born: December 14, 1837; Waterbury, Vermont, U.S.
- Died: April 29, 1892 (aged 54); Manhattan, New York, U.S.
- Burial place: Lakeview Cemetery, Burlington, Vermont, U.S.
- Military career
- Allegiance: United States; Union
- Branch: United States Army; Union Army; Vermont National Guard
- Service years: 1861–1866 (Army); 1866–1872 (National Guard)
- Rank: Brigadier General; Brevet Major General
- Unit: 1st Vermont Cavalry
- Conflicts: American Civil War
- Awards: Medal of Honor
- Other work: Business, politics

William W. Wells Jr. (December 14, 1837 – April 29, 1892) was a businessman, politician, and general in the Union Army during the American Civil War and a Medal of Honor recipient for his gallantry in the Battle of Gettysburg.

== Early life and education ==
Wells was born in Waterbury, Vermont, the third of ten children (nine boys) of William and Eliza Wells. He began his education in the common schools of his native town and mastered the higher branches in Barre Academy and Kimball Union Academy in Meriden, New Hampshire. While in Barre, at the age of 17, he used an odometer in surveying for a county map of Caledonia County, a task which occupied him for two months. From age 19 until the spring of 1861, he was his father's assistant in his extensive business.

== Civil War ==
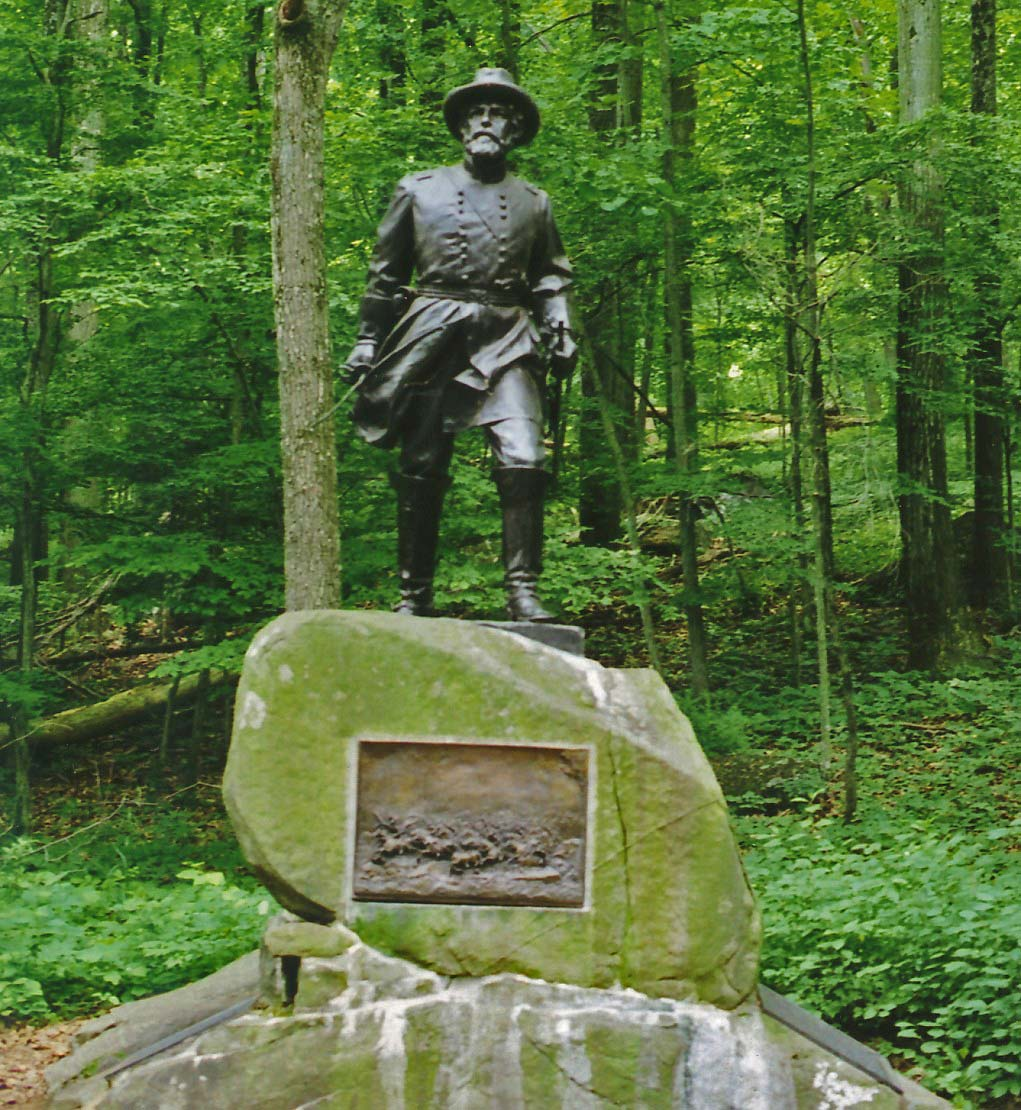
Statue of Wells by J. Otto Schweizer at the Gettysburg Battlefield

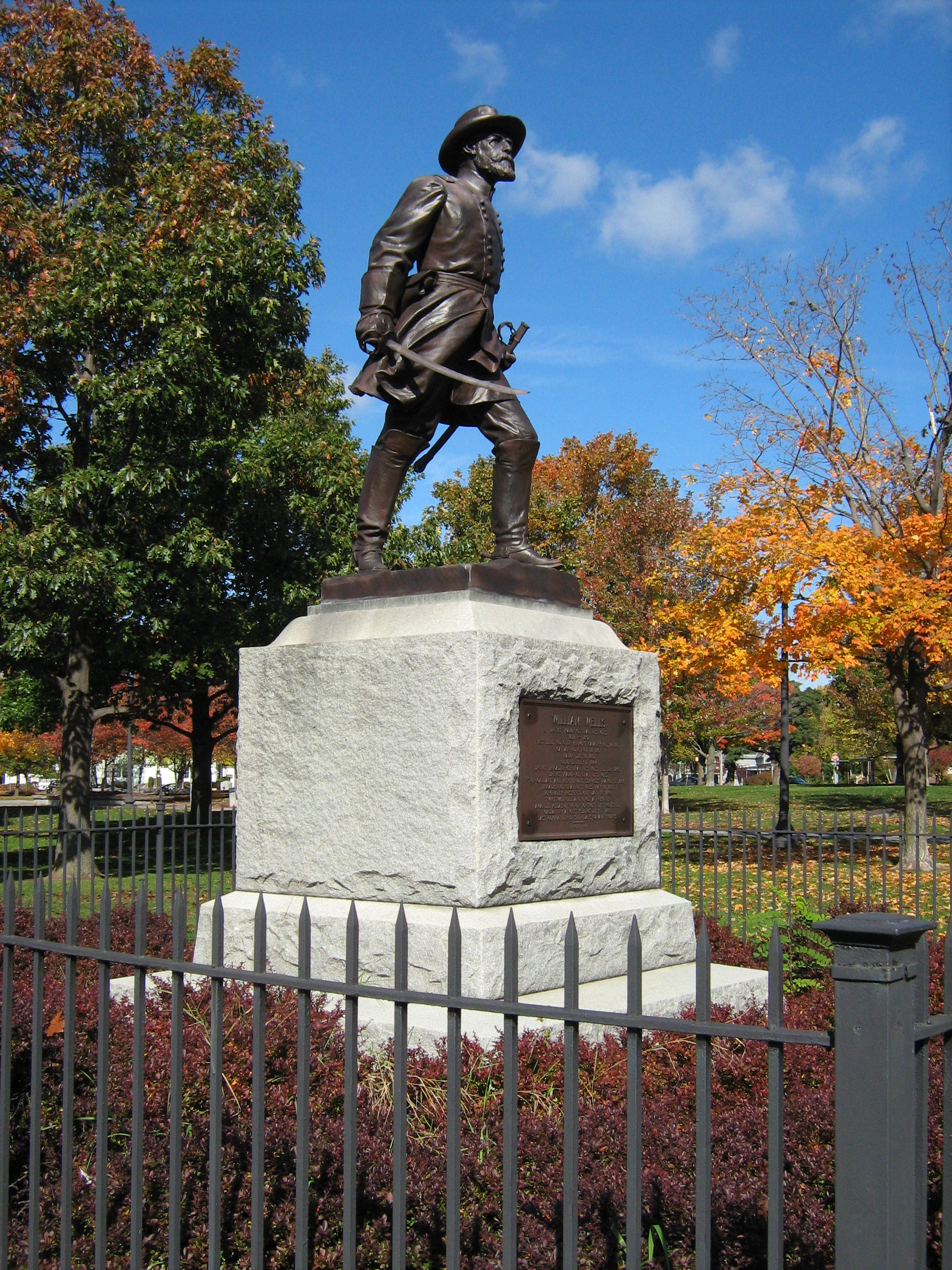
Statue of Wells in Battery Park in Burlington, Vermont. An identical statue can be found in Gettysburg National Park.

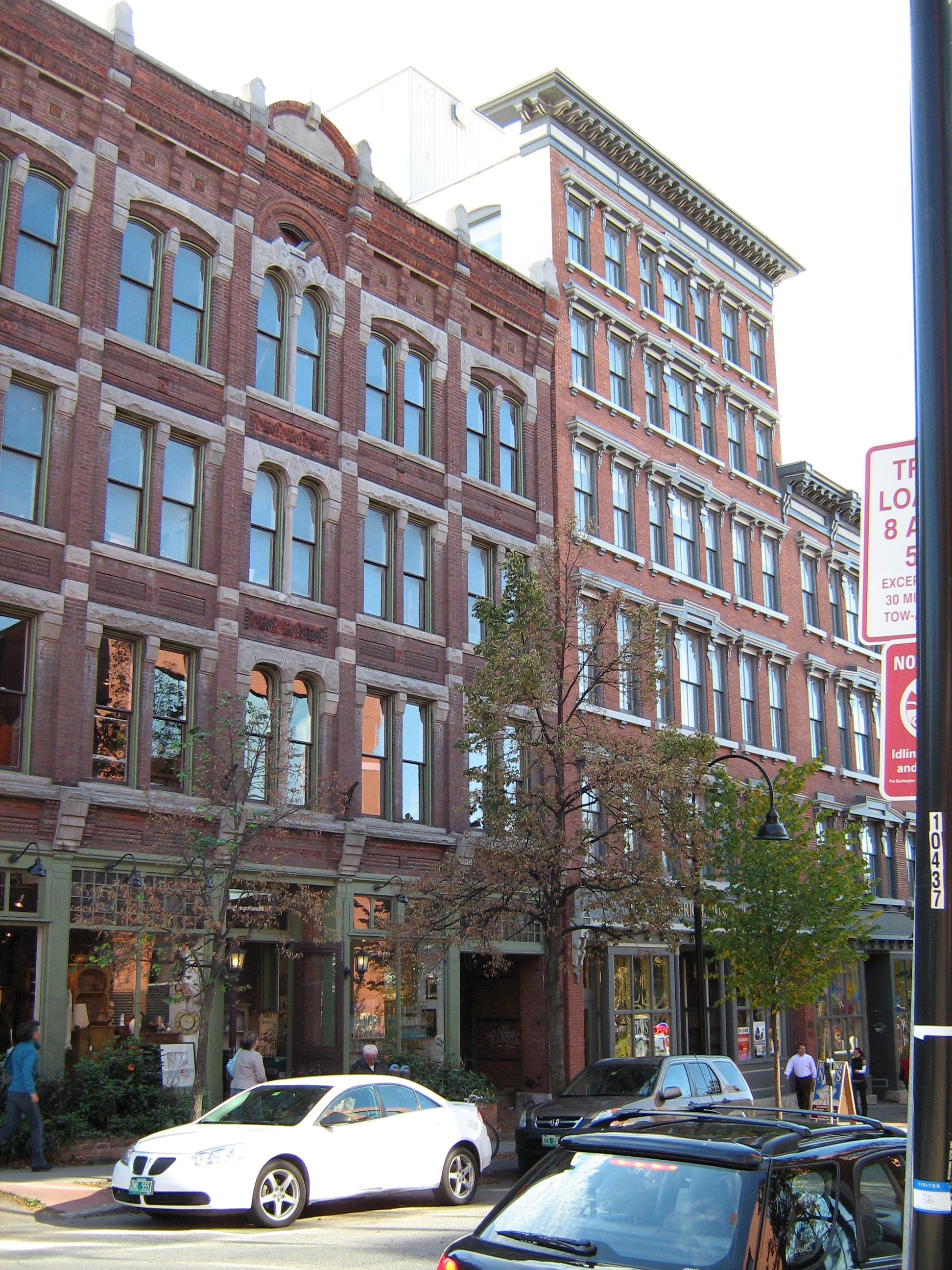
The Wells Richardson Building on College Street in Burlington, Vermont, where Paine's Celery Compound was made, part of the Wells Richardson Historic District listed on the National Register of Historic Places

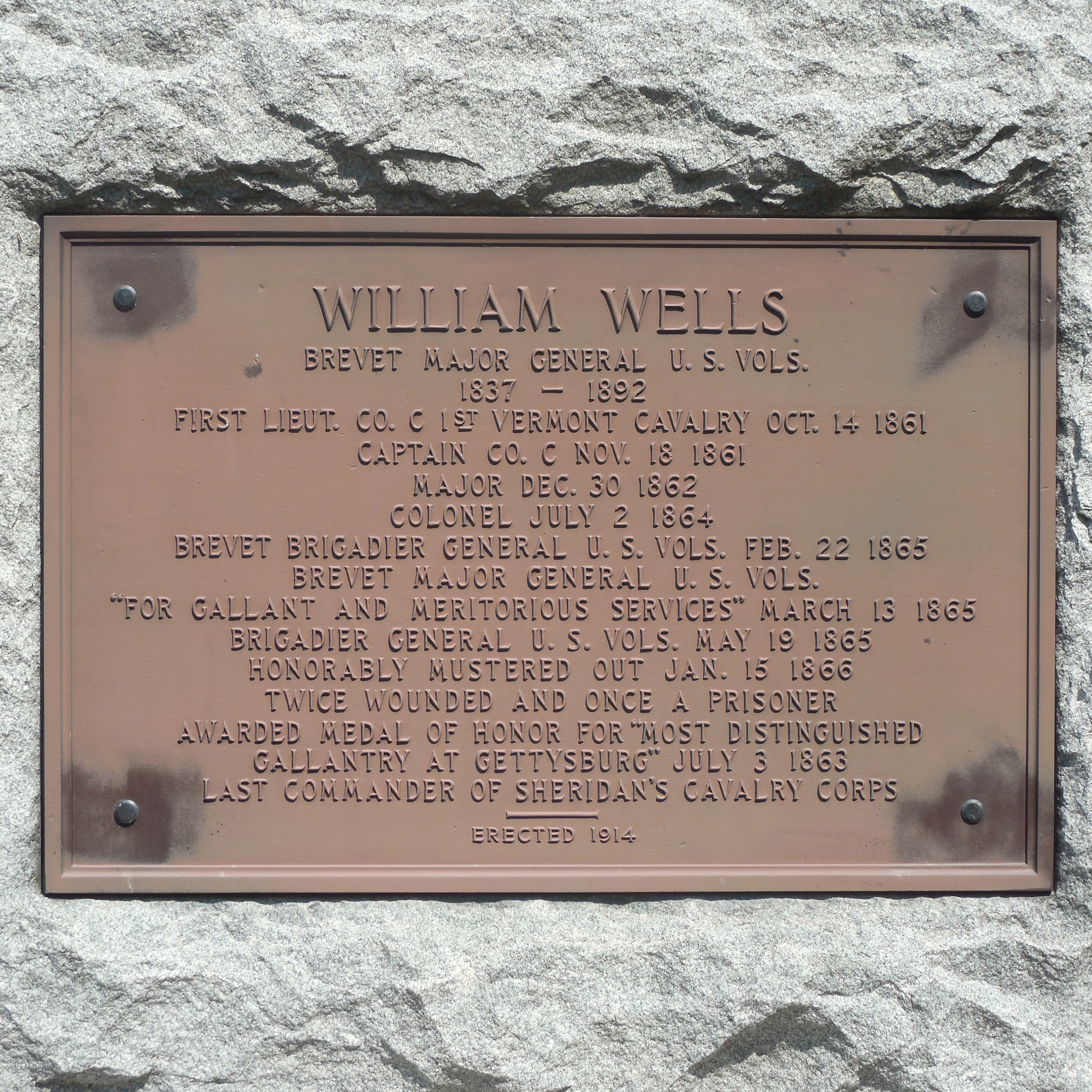
Plaque of Wells' military record at Battery Park in Burlington, Vermont

At the outbreak of the American Civil War, Wells and three of his brothers joined the Union Army. Wells enlisted as a private soldier on September 9, 1861, and assisted in raising Company C of the 1st Vermont Cavalry. He was sworn into Federal service on October 3, 1861, and was soon promoted first lieutenant and then captain in November of that year. He was in the thickest of the fight at Orange Court House, Virginia, August 2, 1862, and was promoted to major on October 30, 1862.

Big Round Top cavalry charge
- Part of Battle of Gettysburg, third day cavalry battles
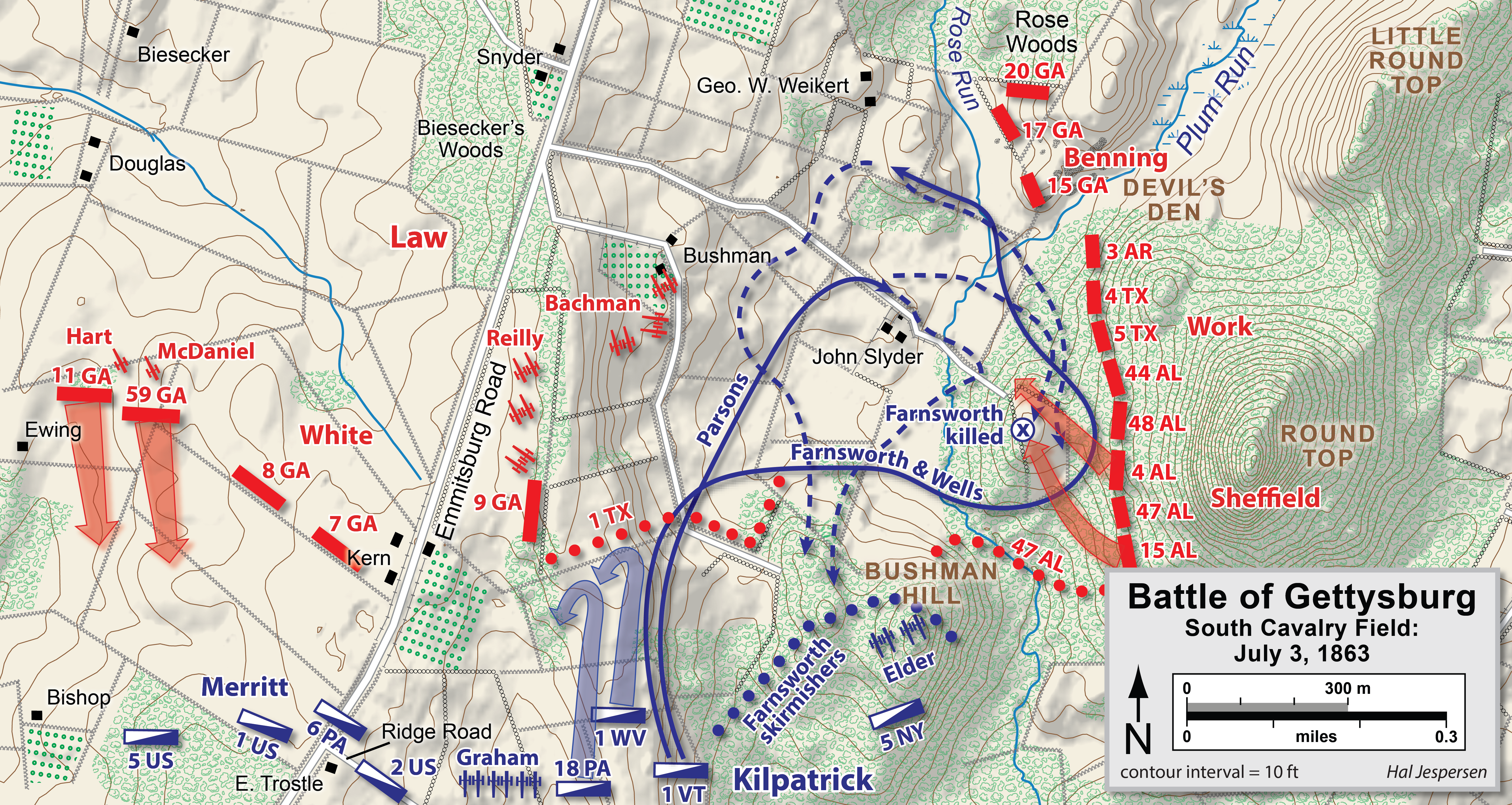
- The Wells cavalry charge rode eastward across Plum Run and along a stone wall to where "the troopers reached the spur" of Big Round Top and turned north to pass to the rear of Law's Alabama regiments. The Confederates turned about and fired on the cavalry: "It was a swift, resistless charge, over rocks, through timber, under close enfilading fire." (Captain Henry C. Parsons) After "a struggle, the hill was carried by the 1st Vermont", and in 1891, Wells received the Medal of Honor for having "led the second battalion of his regiment in a daring charge" at Gettysburg.
| Date | July 3, 1863 (5 pm) |
| Location | Gettysburg Battlefield, Gettysburg, Pennsylvania, U.S. |
| Result | hill "carried by the 1st Vermont", 1891 Wells' Medal of Honor |

Belligerents
| (United States) USA (Union) | (Confederate States of America) CSA (Confederacy) |

Commanders and leaders
| Major William Wells | |

Strength
| 2nd Battalion, 1st VT | 5 regiments of Law's Brigade |
- Following Wells' 1891 Medal of Honor for the charge, his statue was erected on the 1913 1st Vermont monument.

Wells commanded the Second Battalion, 1st Vermont Cavalry, in the repulse of Stuart's Cavalry at the Battle of Hanover during the Gettysburg campaign. In the famous and desperate cavalry charge on Big Round Top on the third day at Gettysburg (July 3, 1863), he commanded the leading battalion, rode by the side of General Farnsworth, the brigade commander, and, almost by a miracle, came out unharmed, while his commander fell in the midst of the enemy's infantry. A few days later, in the savage cavalry melee at the Battle of Boonsboro in Maryland, Wells was wounded by a sabre cut. At Culpeper Court House, Virginia, September 13, 1863, he charged the enemy's artillery with his regiment and captured a gun, and was wounded by a shell.

=== Medal of Honor ===
Congress later awarded Wells a Medal of Honor "for distinguished gallantry at the battle of Gettysburg, July 3, 1863."

In March 1864, following the return of the regiment from the Kilpatrick raid, Wells was detached and placed in command of the 7th Michigan Cavalry, which had lost its commander, for a month. He commanded a battalion of Sheridan's cavalry at the Battle of Yellow Tavern, in which J.E.B. Stuart was killed. Wells was promoted to colonel on June 4, 1864. From September 1864 to April 1865, on several occasions, he commanded the Third Cavalry Division. In the Battle of Tom's Brook, Virginia, on October 9, 1864, a cavalry action, Wells commanded a brigade of Custer's division. At Cedar Creek, his brigade took the foremost part in turning the rout of the morning into a decisive victory at nightfall, capturing 45 of the 48 pieces of artillery taken from Jubal Early's fleeing army.

Wells was appointed brevet brigadier general of volunteers on February 22, 1865. On the personal recommendations of Generals Sheridan and Custer, Wells was commissioned brigadier general May 16, 1865, and he was appointed brevet major general of volunteers, March 30, 1865, "for gallant and meritorious service," having received more promotions than any other Vermont officer during the war (from Private to General in less than three and a half years). Wells served under Generals Kilpatrick, Sheridan, and Custer, and was with Kilpatrick in his famous raid on Richmond, and with James H. Wilson in his daring foray to the south of Richmond. At Appomattox Court House, on the morning of the surrender of the Army of Northern Virginia, Wells' brigade started on its last charge, but was stopped by General Custer in person. He distinguished himself repeatedly in action. Sheridan remarked, "He is my ideal of a cavalry officer."

Following Appomattox, the departure of Sheridan and Custer for Texas left Wells as the ranking officer and last commander of the Cavalry Corps of the Army of the Potomac. At the Grand Review in Washington, D.C. on May 22, 1865, he commanded the Second Brigade of Custer's Division of the Cavalry Corps, which led the advance.

Wells participated in seventy cavalry engagements. In 18 of them, he led a brigade or division. He was honorably mustered out of the army on January 15, 1866.

== Post-Civil War career ==
Soon after General Wells' return to civil life, he became a partner in a firm of wholesale druggists at Waterbury. In 1868, they transferred their business to Burlington, Vermont, which was thereafter his residence. He represented Waterbury in the legislature of 1865–66, being chairman of the military committee and an influential legislator. In 1866 he was elected adjutant general of Vermont, and held the office until 1872. He was succeeded by James Stevens Peck and accepted appointment as collector of customs for the district of Vermont, a position which he filled with efficiency and credit for thirteen years. At the end of that time, he resumed his active connection with the business house known the world over as the Wells Richardson Company, manufacturer of Paine's Celery Compound. General Wells was married with two children — Frank Richardson and Bertha Richardson Wells (who later married Dr. Horatio Nelson Jackson).

In 1886, Wells was a member of the Vermont State Senate from Chittenden County, Vermont. He was active in veteran soldiers' societies; was one of the presidents of the Reunion Society of Vermont Officers, and president of the Society of the First Vermont Cavalry. He was one of the trustees and first president of the Vermont Soldiers' Home, and was a member of the Gettysburg Commission of 1889–90. He was the first commander of the Vermont Commandery of the Loyal Legion, and would have been re-elected had he lived until the coming annual meeting of the Commandery. He was a member of Stannard Post, No. 2, G. A. R., Department of Vermont, and would have been made department commander several years ago had he been willing to accept an election as such. He was a member of the Vermont Society of Sons of the American Revolution.

General Wells was identified with many important business enterprises in the city, being president of the Burlington Trust Company, president of the Burlington Gas-Light Company, president of the Burlington Board of Trade, director in the Burlington Cold Storage Company, director in the Rutland Railroad Company and director in the Champlain Transportation Company. He was a member and a vestryman of St. Paul's church, and was one of the trustees of the Young Men's Christian Association of Burlington, and one of its most liberal supporters.

In 1892, Wells died suddenly of angina pectoris in New York City. Because Wells was well-known and respected in the community, Burlington effectively shut down for his funeral. His remains lie at Lakeview Cemetery on North Avenue.

== See also ==
- List of Medal of Honor recipients for the Battle of Gettysburg
- List of American Civil War Medal of Honor recipients: T–Z
- List of American Civil War generals (Union)

== Sources ==
This article is a composite of information from the following articles, all of which are in the public domain. The three articles, in their entirety, with additional links and material, are available on the Vermont in the Civil War website.

- Carleton, Hiram, Genealogical and Family History of the State of Vermont, New York: Lewis Publishing Company, 1903.
- Cross, David F., "A Tale of Two Statues: The William Wells Statues at Gettysburg and Burlington, Vermont."
- Jackson, H. Nelson, Dedication of the Statue to Brevet Major-General William Wells and the Officers and Men of the First Regiment Vermont Cavalry, on the Battlefield of Gettysburg July 3, 1913, Privately printed, 1914.

== Additional reading ==
- Vermont, Adjutant and Inspector General's Office. Revised Roster of Vermont Volunteers and lists of Vermonters who served in the Army and Navy of the United States During The War of the Rebellion, 1861-66, Montpelier, Vt: Press of the Watchman Publishing Co., 1892.

Military offices
| Preceded by Peter T. Washburn | Vermont Adjutant General; 1866–1872 | Succeeded by James Stevens Peck |
