= Matt K. Lewis =

American political pundit

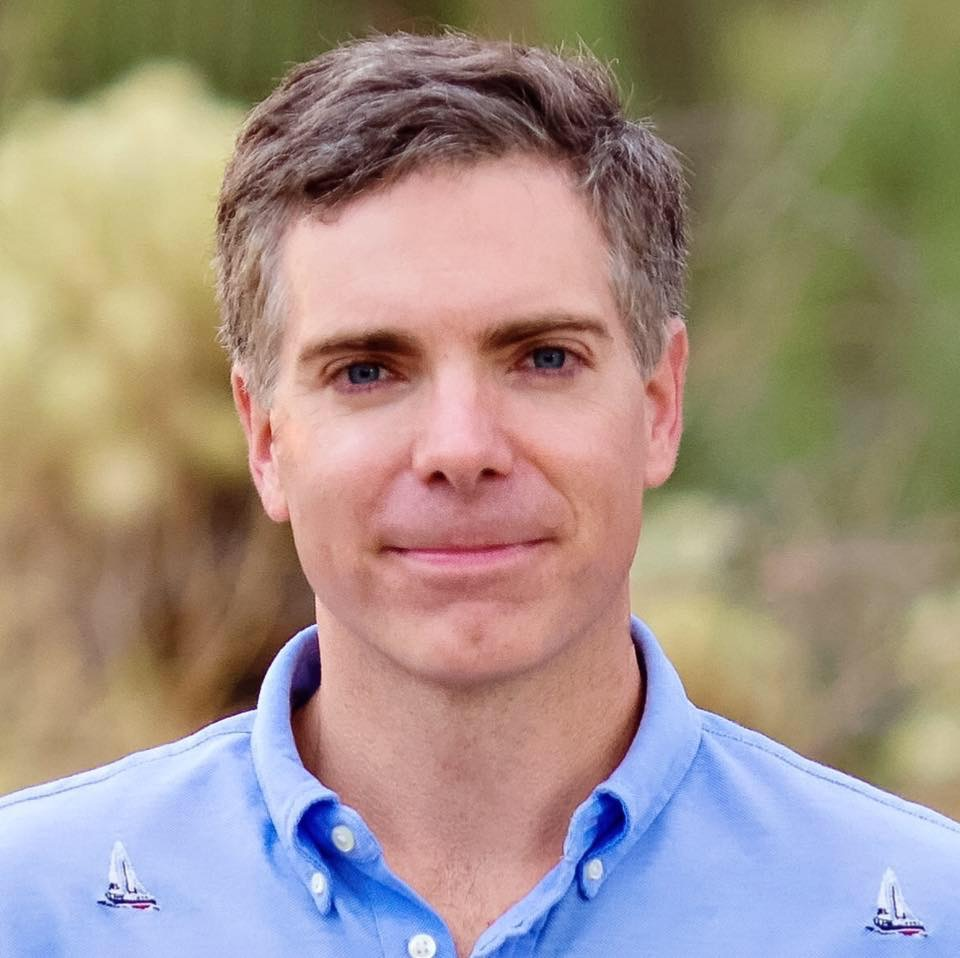
- Lewis in 2016
- Born: 1974 or 1975 (age 51–52)
- Education: Shepherd University
- Occupation: Political commentator
- Employer(s): The Daily Beast and The Week
- Spouse: Erin DeLullo
- Children: 2
- Website: mattklewis.com

Matt K. Lewis (born 1974/1975) is an American conservative political writer, blogger, podcaster, and columnist for The Daily Beast, formerly with The Daily Caller. He has also contributed to The Week and The Washington Sun. Lewis has appeared on CNN and MSNBC as a political commentator.

== Early life and education ==
Lewis was raised in Myersville, Maryland. He was educated at Middletown High School, a public high school in Middletown, Maryland, followed by Shepherd University in Shepherdstown, West Virginia, and is based in Alexandria, Virginia.

== Career ==
As a writer, Lewis has contributed to Townhall.com, AOL's PoliticsDaily.com, Human Events, and The Daily Caller. In his early career, Lewis served as director of grassroots for the Leadership Institute, a nonprofit conservative training organization for which he organized and led workshops around the United States. In March 2007, Lewis was one of two bloggers invited on John McCain's campaign tour bus on a visit to New Hampshire for an interview with the candidate. That September, former Speaker of the House Newt Gingrich acknowledged in an interview with Lewis that he was considering a presidential run. Lewis is the editor of The Quotable Rogue: The Ideals of Sarah Palin in Her Own Words, published in 2011.

Lewis was selected as a "Rising Star of Politics" by Politics Magazine in 2002 and by the American Conservative Union as "Blogger of the Year" in 2012.

Lewis' book Too Dumb to Fail: How the GOP Betrayed the Reagan Revolution to Win Elections (and How It Can Reclaim Its Conservative Roots) was published in January 2016, receiving attention from The New York Times, The Weekly Standard, and other publications. Lewis's second book, Filthy Rich Politicians: The Swamp Creatures, Latte Liberals, and Ruling Class Elites Cashing in on America, was published in July 2023.

== Media appearances ==
Lewis is a frequent commentator on cable television and radio who has appeared as a political commentator "from the right" for CNN in 2016, and has appeared multiple times on Real Time with Bill Maher. Since February 2009, he has represented the conservative viewpoint on Bloggingheads.tv's weekly discussion of American politics, opposite Bill Scher.
