= Emma Vigeland =

American political commentator (born 1994)

- Born: April 18, 1994 (age 32); New York City, New York, U.S.
- Education: Lafayette College (BA)

YouTube information
- Channel: The Majority Report w/Sam Seder
- Years active: 2016–present
- Genres: Politics; news; humor; debate; interview; live call-in
- Subscribers: 2.04 million
- Views: 1.35 billion
- Last updated: April 15, 2026

Emma Vigeland (/ˈvɪɡlənd/ VIG-lənd; born April 18, 1994) is an American progressive political commentator, producer, and media host. She has co-hosted The Majority Report with Sam Seder since 2020, and previously worked as a reporter and producer for The Young Turks.

Vigeland is a social and economic progressive whose commentary focuses on labor rights, campaign finance reform, social justice issues, anti-imperialism, and anti-Zionism.

== Early life and education ==
Vigeland was born in New York City and raised in Glen Ridge, New Jersey. She attended Kent Place School in Summit until 2012, where she led the school's High School Democrats of America chapter.

Vigeland attended Lafayette College in Easton, Pennsylvania, where she was a member of Kappa Kappa Gamma sorority. She graduated cum laude in 2016 with a bachelor's degree in government and law. Her senior thesis focused on campaign finance reform and its impact on political participation.

== Career ==
In 2016, Vigeland began her media career when she joined the progressive news network The Young Turks (TYT) as a political intern. In 2017, after Jordan Chariton's departure, she became a full-time political correspondent and producer for TYT's "Rebel HQ" series, where she covered the progressive movement, the MAGA movement, and political corruption. In 2018, she interviewed Alexandria Ocasio-Cortez during her primary campaign against Joe Crowley, making TYT and The Intercept the only national news outlets to cover Ocasio-Cortez before her upset victory. Vigeland told Time that Ocasio-Cortez's victory showed the resonance of the progressive agenda with voters. Vigeland attended several Donald Trump rallies, where she interviewed attendees about immigration policy and other key campaign issues.

In November 2020, Vigeland became a co-host and producer for the progressive news show The Majority Report with Sam Seder, working alongside Sam Seder, filling the vacant position left by Michael Brooks' sudden death.

Vigeland also hosted a progressive sports-focused show, Emma Sports Vigeland Network (ESVN), a pun on ESPN.

In 2023, Vigeland joined a livestream hosted by U.S. Representative Ro Khanna outside the White House, where Khanna was interviewed about topics including the importance of youth political participation and ways to advance progressive political sentiment.

In 2026, Matt Bernstein and Vigeland held an interview with Michigan Senate candidate Mallory McMorrow, in which McMorrow defended US support for the Iron Dome during the Gaza war. After McMorrow said, "I don't think anybody should live in fear of being bombed or killed," Vigeland sarcastically asked whether Palestinians should have their own Iron Dome, and McMorrow replied that the idea was worth discussing.

== Political views ==
Vigeland identifies with the progressive wing of the American left. Vigeland supports stronger labor rights, Medicare For All, reducing wealth inequality, reducing corporate influence in politics, and stronger environmental regulation. Vigeland has praised unionization efforts in media. She supported Bernie Sanders in the 2020 primaries.

In a 2019 The Hill panel, she criticized Barack Obama for abandoning a public option in the Affordable Care Act. In July 2024, The New Yorker listed Vigeland and Chapo Trap House as online leftist figures whose social media posts helped seed wider enthusiasm for Kamala Harris' campaign launch. In a 2025 MSNBC panel, Vigeland criticized Ezra Klein, who had written a piece for the New York Times in which he suggested that Democrats should spend more time listening to centrist voices within the party; Vigeland described Klein as "representing a floundering, corporatist, centrist flank that is increasingly irrelevant in the party". In a December 2025 CNN NewsNight panel, Vigeland attributed inflation during the Biden administration partly to supply-chain bottlenecks and the COVID-19 pandemic, while Scott Jennings argued that policy choices had contributed to rising prices. In a December 2025 NewsNight panel, Vigeland said that the United States had lost moral standing because of its complicity in the Gaza genocide. In a March 2026 NewsNight panel, Vigeland connected the 2026 Iran war to Gaza, cited B'Tselem and Amnesty International in describing Israel's conduct as genocide, and said that neither Iran nor Israel should have nuclear weapons.

Vigeland is a member of the Democratic Socialists of America. Following primary wins by DSA candidates in New York and Colorado in June 2026, Vigeland was quoted by Politico as saying "It's DSA summer" with the victories representing "the culmination of 10 years of democratic socialism becoming more mainstream".

== Personal life ==
Vigeland married her husband in 2025. An ardent New York sports fan, Vigeland supports the New York Giants, New York Knicks, New York Rangers and New York Mets.
