= G. W. Peck (disambiguation) =

G. W. Peck is a fictional mathematician.

G. W. Peck may also refer to:

- George Washington Peck, U.S. Representative from Michigan
- George Wilbur Peck, governor of the U.S. state of Wisconsin

== See also ==
- George Peck (disambiguation)
