= George Peck =

George Peck may refer to:

- George Peck, co-founder of Peck & Peck, a former New York-based retailer of private label women's wear
- George Peck (artist) (born 1941), Hungarian visual artist
- George Peck (clergyman) (1797–1876), clergyman, author, editor of the Methodist Episcopal Church
- George Peck (Ontario politician) (1917–1993), Ontario provincial MPP
- George Peck (theatre), principal founder of the Oxford School of Drama
- George H. Peck (1856–1940), California real estate developer
- George Washington Peck (1818–1905), U.S. Representative from Michigan.
- George Wilbur Peck (1840–1916), author, mayor of Milwaukee, governor of Wisconsin

== See also ==
- G. W. Peck (disambiguation)
  - G. W. Peck, mathematical group pseudonym sometimes identified with George Wilbur Peck
- Peck (surname)
