= Atrios =

American blogger and political economist

Duncan Bowen Black
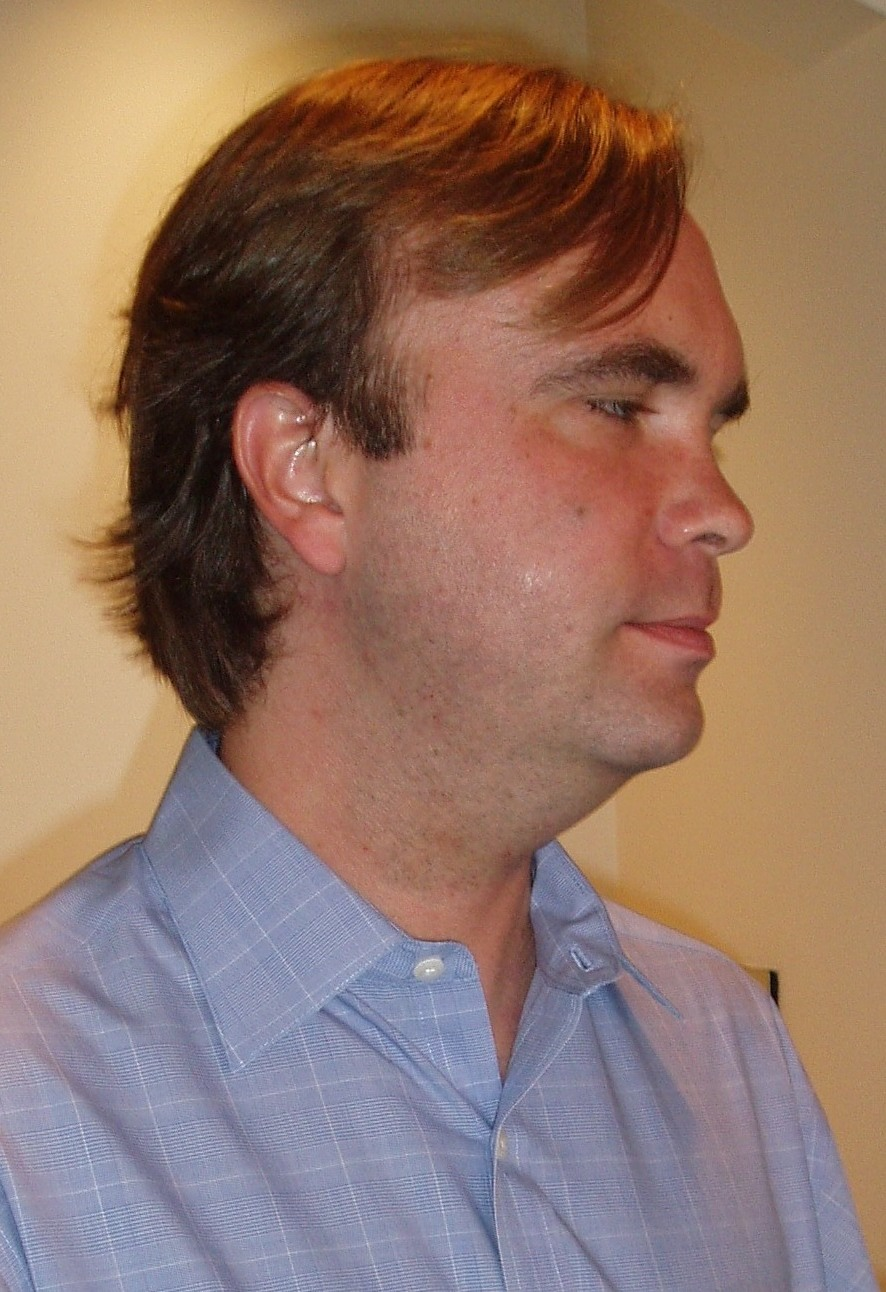
- Black in 2006
- Born: February 18, 1972 (age 54); Australia
- Education: Indiana University of Pennsylvania (BA); Brown University (PhD)
- Known for: Eschaton weblog
- Call sign: Atrios
- Website: eschatonblog.com

Duncan Bowen Black (born February 18, 1972), better known by his pseudonym Atrios /ˈeɪtri.oʊs/, is an American liberal blogger living in Philadelphia. His weblog is called Eschaton. Black was also a regular guest economics expert on Air America Radio's The Majority Report and is currently a regular commentator on Sam Seder's internet radio (Majority.fm) Majority Report and an op-ed contributor to USA Today.

== Biography ==
After obtaining his BA from the Indiana University of Pennsylvania, Black obtained a PhD in economics from Brown University in 1999. He has worked at the London School of Economics, the Université catholique de Louvain, the University of California, Irvine, and, most recently, Bryn Mawr College. He is now a Senior Fellow at the media research group Media Matters for America.

Black began his online political life in Salon magazine's Tabletalk messageboards under the pseudonym of Kurt Foster, then began blogging as Atrios, remaining pseudonymous for several years, and even joking that he was actually a high school gym teacher. According to Black, the name "Atrios" is actually a (misspelled) reference to a character named Antrios in the Yasmina Reza play 'Art' who paints the play's key "white painting on white canvas".

Before starting Eschaton, Black wrote (as Atrios) for the webzine Media Whores Online (now defunct). During the 2004 Democratic National Convention in Boston, he revealed that he had accepted a job at Media Matters for America and allowed his name and photograph to be published. He later said that as an academic he blogged pseudonymously to avoid attacks like those later unleashed on Timothy Shortell. Atrios' blogging has been characterized as encouraging discourse and public deliberation.

== Eschaton ==
Black's weblog Eschaton generally features short entries on a variety of topics ranging from policy commentary to breaking news and links. Posts are frequent — on the order of ten every day. The majority of posts are authored by Black (as Atrios), but there are occasional guest bloggers. On June 29, 2005, Black described Eschaton as not a blog but an "Online Magazine of News, Commentary, and Editorial." Following a similar announcement from The Talent Show, this was a satirical reaction to Federal Election Commission hearings on the Bipartisan Campaign Reform Act. Black had previously expressed frustration that the FEC might not apply the act's "media exemption" to blogs, which he regarded as equivalent to other forms of media including online magazines.

== Appearance in fiction ==
Atrios (portrayed by an uncredited actor) appeared briefly in the 7th season West Wing episode "Welcome to Wherever You Are" (Episode 7x15) meeting with the fictional Democratic presidential candidate Matt Santos. Atrios was introduced by Josh Lyman (played by Bradley Whitford) as having "raised 300 grand online" and having "almost as many readers as The Philadelphia Inquirer".

== Language ==
Duncan Black is credited with creating the neologism "Friedman Unit" to refer to The New York Times columnist Tom Friedman's predilection for repeatedly using the next six months as the critical time period for the Iraq War and the term "High Broderism" for an approach to politics characterized by "the worship of bipartisanship for its own sake" as a cover for "the defense of...'the establishment' at all costs".
