= Richard Peck =

Richard Peck may refer to:

- Richard Peck (RAF officer) (1893–1952), Air Marshal of the Royal Air Force
- Richard Peck (writer) (1934–2018), American novelist
- Richard Peck (British Army officer) (born 1937), English cricketer and army officer
- Richard Peck (lawyer) (born 1948), Canadian lawyer
- USS Richard Peck, an auxiliary ship of the United States Navy
