= Media Whores Online =

- Website type: Webzine
- Owner: JennyQ aka Jennifer Kelly
- Creator: JennyQ
- Website: N/A
- Commercial: No
- Launched: 2000
- Current status: Defunct

Media Whores Online, also known as mediawhoresonline.com or The Horse or often just MWO, was a liberal American political webzine that operated as a media watchdog. The site operated from 2000 until early 2004, and quickly established a reputation for quotability. By 2002 James Carville and Paul Begala would frequently cite MWO on CNN's Crossfire. The founder, known pseudonymously as Jennifer Kelly or JennyQ, has never been publicly identified.

The activities of JennyQ apparently began on the Salon.com Table Talk forums. That same year, MWO was noted for having created a Chris Matthews drinking game.

MWO published sometimes-daily blog-like updates of news stories. Its best-known feature was the "Whore of the Week" item, which skewered a generally high-profile media figure for favorable coverage of Republicans or uncritical acceptance of right-wing talking points. A converse feature was a standing "Media in Exile" list of reporters and others that MWO deemed to "uphold the standards of journalism". Corresponding with Eric Alterman, MWO called its strategy "mimic[king] the tactics of the wingnuts", calling it an "easy" standard to uphold. Fans considered its writing very funny, full of "wit and sarcasm."

In 2001, liberal blogger Duncan Black published two early pieces on MWO under his pseudonym Atrios.

In 2002, the site was controversially profiled by Salon.com, noting how CNN anchor Aaron Brown had received "hundreds of e-mails" after MWO criticized him. MWO began emphasizing politeness after the incident. Freelancer Jennifer Liberto claimed to have determined that the site was run by Bartcop's Terry Coppage and Marc Perkel, a conclusion both vehemently denied. MWO had always linked directly to Bartcop's site and an essay of his, The Myth of the "liberal" media, as a kind of mission statement. Adding to the mystery, the moniker "Jennifer Kelly" was apparently abandoned, with the operators responding only by e-mails that were signed "The Editors." The Editors confessed to having an outside underwriter, and at one point conservative pundit Tucker Carlson demanded of liberal Joe Conason whether MWO was his, which Conason denied. Not even regular contributors to the site seemed to know Kelly's identity.

In 2003, the site was rated 8th most influential by Brendan Nyhan for Online Journalism Review.

In early 2004, the site was noted for having encouraged bloggers to create "watchblogs" that would dog the every move of individual reporters or conservative pundits. A The New Yorker profile of Al Gore by David Remnick noted that mediawhoresonline.com was bookmarked on the former Vice President's laptop.

In a 2004 e-mail to Salon, MWO defended its contributors' anonymity, saying exposure could "detrimentally affect their employment," and invoked the "long tradition of anonymous speech in America." Around that point, the MWO site went dark with the note "Out to Pasture" (with two horses showing). When journalist David Neiwert corresponded with the MWO operator, he was told simply that "real life" had prevented blogging, but that MWO hoped to return for the fall elections, which never happened.

The nickname The Horse derived from recurring errors in transcripts of TV programs which mentioned the site; the transcripts called it "Media Horse Online."
