= William Peck =

William Peck may refer to:

- William Peck (astronomer) (1862–1925), Scottish astronomer and instrument maker
- William Peck (MP) for New Shoreham
- William Buckley Peck (1870–1941) American physician, surgeon, and founder of the Inter-State Postgraduate Medical Association of North America
- William Dandridge Peck (1763–1822), American botanist and entomologist
- William E. Peck (1849–1897), American school administrator, founder of Pomfret School in Connecticut
- William H. Peck (1830–1892), American writer
- William R. Peck (1831–1871), American plantation owner, politician, and Confederate Army general
- William S. Peck Jr. (1916–1987), Louisiana state representative
- William S. Peck Sr. (1873–1946), Louisiana state representative
- William Virgil Peck (1804–1877), Associate Justice of the Supreme Court of Ohio
- William Ware Peck (1821–1897), Justice of the Territorial Wyoming Supreme Court
- Bill Peck (William Peck, born 1979), American guitarist
- Bill Peck (American football) (1926–2017), American football player and coach
