= Friedman Unit =

Humorous reference to six months

The Friedman Unit, or simply Friedman, is a tongue-in-cheek neologism. One Friedman Unit is equal to six months, specifically the "next six months", a period repeatedly declared by New York Times columnist Thomas Friedman to be the most critical of the then-ongoing Iraq War even though such pronouncements extended back over two and a half years.

== History ==
The term is in reference to a May 16, 2006, article by Fairness and Accuracy in Reporting (FAIR) detailing the repeated use by columnist Thomas Friedman of "the next six months" as the period in which, according to Friedman, "we're going to find out... whether a decent outcome is possible" in the Iraq War. As documented by FAIR, Friedman had been making such six-month predictions for a period of two and a half years, on at least fourteen different occasions, starting with a column in the November 30, 2003, edition of The New York Times, in which he stated: "The next six months in Iraq—which will determine the prospects for democracy-building there—are the most important six months in U.S. foreign policy in a long, long time."

In tribute to Friedman's recurring prognostications, blogger Duncan Black (Atrios) coined the eponymous unit.

Similar predictions by others began to be judged by the new metric in the blogosphere. For example, Zalmay Khalizad, U.S. Ambassador to Iraq, had said in June 2005 that "the next nine months are critical", now interpreted as predicting that in 1.5 Friedman units the U.S. might have a better grasp on the situation.

In September, 2007, Friedman agreed not to call for any more FUs: "Stephen Colbert brings on Thomas Friedman, author of The World is Flat.... Colbert offers up the same six months (also known as a Friedman Unit or FU) that Friedman has spent the last four years claiming would be all we need to see "success in Iraq", but Friedman admits we're all out of FUs." After Barack Obama had designated the summer of 2010 as his goal for starting to bring American troops home from Iraq, with the end of 2010 as his deadline, in October 2008 Friedman was reported as calling for another Friedman unit, giving his opinion that, if elected, President Obama should let troops remain until 2011.

A Way with Words noted that Friedman had also been calling for more Friedman units in other contexts. This refers to his appearance on The Daily Show on June 12, 2006.

The term has been used in puns, for example, "Commander of the Friedman Unit," an article about the political hopes of Friedman for a third-party candidate in the U.S. presidential race of 2012.

== Impact ==
It is used in discussions of whether it's too soon to tell if the U.S. is making progress. It worked its way into commentary on the war and whether an interval was indeed critical.

Journalist Spencer Ackerman referred to the unit to measure the progress of American goals in other Middle Eastern countries, such as Afghanistan in 2009: "Ah, the Friedman unit, that beloved Internet tradition denoting the six-month increment many pundits believe will prove decisive in any war, only to be subject to an endless addition of ... Friedman units."

Ezra Klein invented another Friedman-based term: "Friedman's Choice ... states that our real choices in Iraq are 10 months or 10 years. Either we commit the resources to entirely rebuild the place over a decade, for which there is little support, or we tell everyone that we will be out within 10 months, or sooner, and we'll deal with the consequences from afar."

== See also ==
- List of humorous units of measurement
