= North Star Self-Directed Learning for Teens =

North Star: Self-Directed Learning for Teens
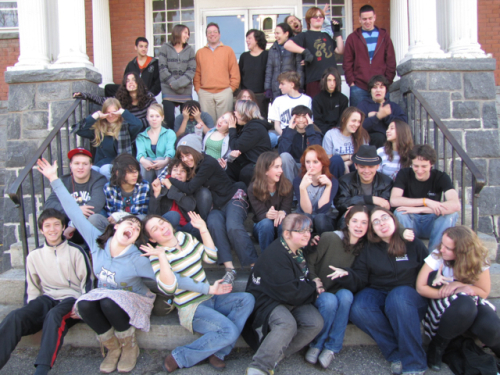
- Gathering of teens and staff (2010)

Location
- 45 Amherst Road; Sunderland, Massachusetts 01375; United States
- Coordinates: 42°27′55.5″N 72°34′34.1″W

Information
- Type: Self-directed learning center
- Motto: "Learning is natural. School is optional."
- Established: 1996
- Founders: Kenneth Danford, Joshua Hornick
- Director: Kenneth Danford
- Staff: 8 (2016)
- Age range: 11 to 19 years
- Enrollment: 60+
- Affiliation: Nonsectarian
- Alumni: 500+
- Information: fee-based, nonprofit
- Website: northstarteens.org

North Star Self-Directed Learning for Teens is a self-directed learning center in Sunderland, Massachusetts, founded in 1996. The mission of North Star is to help teenagers find ways to learn and excel outside of traditional middle school and high school. It offers a non-coercive learning environment without required classes, grades or tests. Members range in age from 11 to 19 years old. Both previously-schooled teens and long-time homeschoolers attend the center. As of 2015, North Star has over 60 members and over 500 alumni from all over the Pioneer Valley and beyond.

North Star was founded by two Massachusetts middle school teachers who were frustrated with a system that forced students to attend their classes. In contrast, North Star supports teenagers to self-direct their education, offering a program of optional classes, tutoring, trips and community events, taught and organized by North Star's professional staff and an extensive network of volunteers. Each North Star member is paired with an advisor who supports and encourages the teen as they transition to self-directed learning. The center is funded through sliding-scale tuition and donations.

== History ==
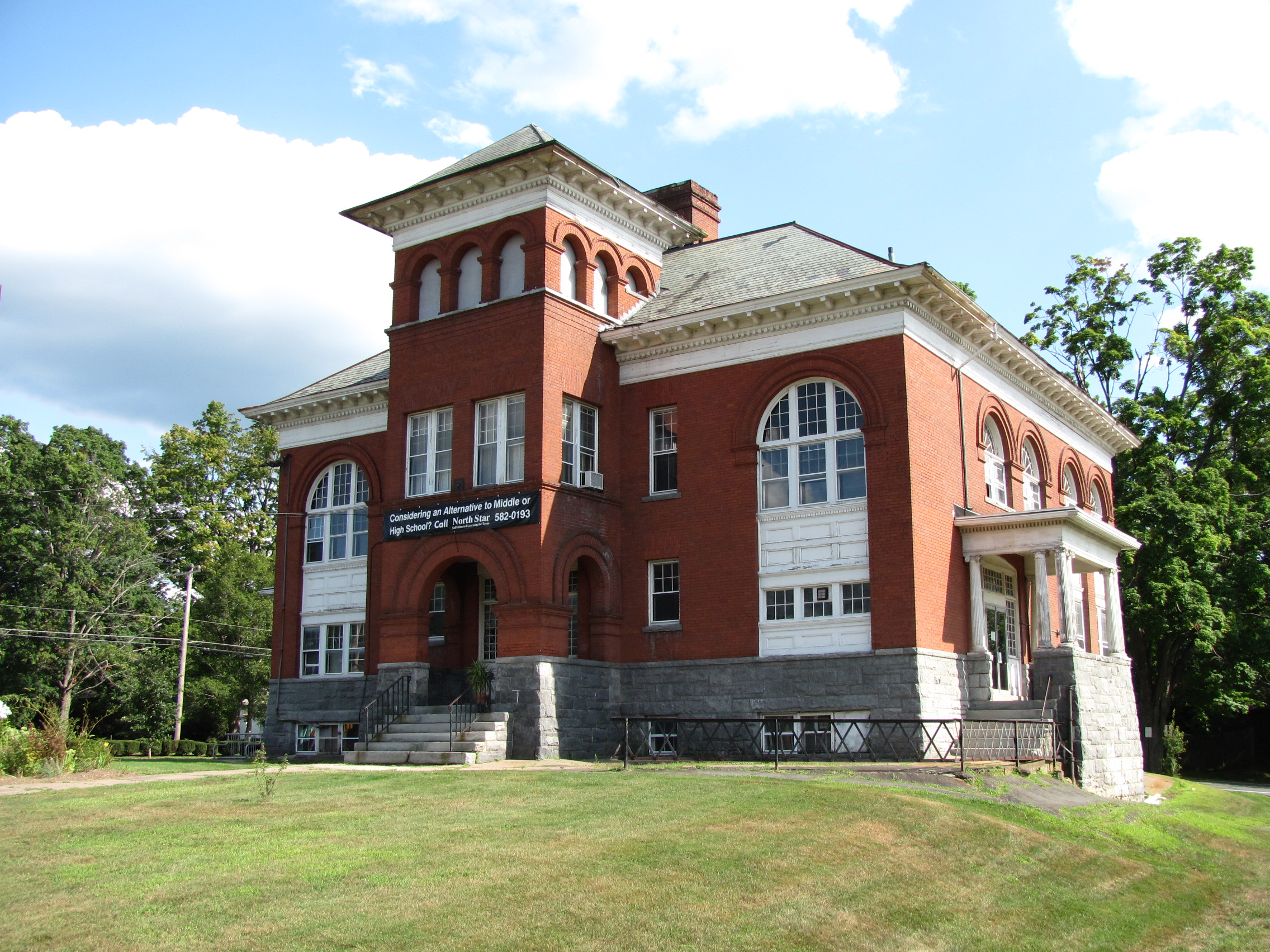
Russell Street School building in Hadley, Massachusetts

North Star was founded as Pathfinder Learning Center by Kenneth Danford and Joshua Hornick in 1996. After reading Grace Llewellyn's book The Teenage Liberation Handbook they both quit their jobs as middle school teachers to create a career that would make what Llewellyn described possible for teenagers in their area.

In 2002, the center was renamed North Star: Self-Directed Learning for Teens, and in 2007 the center moved into the historic Russell Street School building in Hadley, Massachusetts.

In June 2015, North Star moved to Sunderland due to safety concerns with the Russell Street building.

== Program ==
Using homeschooling as a tool to get out of school, North Star works personally with each teen and their family to create an educational plan that is supported by North Star's staff and teachers. This customized plan consists of a staff adviser, parent conferences, and classes, tutorials, workshops, or tutoring if desired and available. North Star works with every interested family, regardless of ability to pay tuition or fees.

Classes, tutorials, and workshops are taught by staff members, volunteers, or college students through work-study. Classes are scheduled Monday, Tuesday, Thursday, and Friday, and the centre is closed on Wednesdays and weekends. Attendance is non-compulsory and there are no required classes.

== The North Star model ==
Since 2010, several self-directed learning centres have opened in both the United States and Canada, using the approach and program pioneered by North Star. The centres are part of the Liberated Learners network which supports people to create centres based on the North Star model.
