= Robert Peck =

Robert Peck may refer to:

- Robert Newton Peck (1928–2020), American author
- Robert W. Peck, 21st-century Canadian diplomat
- Bob Peck (1945–1999), English actor
- Bob Peck (athletic director) (1928–2021), American coach and athletic director
- Robert Peck (MP for Lincoln) (died c. 1400)
- Robert Peck (MP for Huntingdon), 15th-century MP for Huntingdon

== See also ==
- Bob Peck (American football) (1891–1932), American football player
