= Jamie Peck (podcaster) =

American writer, podcaster, and model

Jamie Elizabeth Peck is an American writer, podcaster and former model. She currently co-hosts the Party Girls podcast, and she previously produced and contributed to The Majority Report with Sam Seder and the Antifada podcast.

== Early life ==
Peck is from West Hartford, Connecticut. In 2007, she graduated from Columbia University in New York City.

== Blogging career ==
On January 14, 2009, Peck wrote for the Vice blog in a piece titled, "I work in a biography factory". In December 2010, Peck first received notoriety when she was interviewed in The New York Observer for her blog with Village Voice Media called Naked City NY; this blog, along with the companion Naked City LA, had been live for several months but never linked to or promoted by Village Voice. She was the sole editor for the blog and had written 519 posts during Naked City's run. However, she announced that Village Voice Media had informed her they were cancelling the site. She told the New York Observer in an interview that she'd "never been the sole editor of a blog before" and that contributing to the site "was definitely a good experience".

Peck continued her writing career, and was still being published in the Village Voice as well as for the site The Gloss. In June 2012, her work on the site Crushable.com about the television show Girls was referenced in a New York Times article about the show in its 'Fashion' section. One month later, the New York Observer featured a story about Peck's writing for The Gloss about her apparent "Missed Connection for Friendship" with Luka Rocco who had been accused of cannibalism. One month after that, another of her stories (while blogging for Crushable) was referenced in an LA Times article about how Chris Brown reacted to Rihanna's Oprah Winfrey interview.

In 2013, she announced she would be leaving The Gloss but would continue write for the Village Voice and other outlets. On April 22, 2015, it was announced that Peck would be joining the blog Death + Taxes. It was writing on this site that in December 2016, Peck would again be featured in the New York Times, this time in an article about Hillary Clinton under its 'Politics' section.

== Sexual misconduct allegation against Terry Richardson ==
On November 30, 2011, Peck wrote an account for The Gloss about her experiences with photographer Terry Richardson when she was 19 and was working as a model. In the account she alleged that during a 2004 photo-shoot, he disrobed and had "asked her to touch his penis". This story was picked up by Jezebel and later the New York Times.

During a follow-up story two days later, Jezebel wrote that "Following the publication of Peck's allegations, other stories of Richardson's questionable behavior at work poured forth." In a 2014 article about the allegations The Cut credited Peck's article itself writing that "It was after Peck's vividly detailed account that the narrative of Richardson as predator, as opposed to kinky eccentric, gained traction." In a 2017 piece about the subject, The Untitled Magazine wrote that it was Jezebel's coverage of Peck's article that was the tipping point in the controversy, writing that after Jezebel picked up the story "scores of models, stylists, fashion writers, and modeling bookers came forward [...] describing their own stories of abuse. Since then, models including Coco Rocha, Rie Rasmussen, Felice Fawn, and Charlotte Waters have also spoken out against Richardson."

When asked about Peck's article in 2012, The New York Times wrote that Richardson had "declined to discuss Ms. Peck's comments".

In 2014, Peck wrote once more about her experience in article for The Guardian, where she wrote "From Roman Polanski to Woody Allen and thousands of 'nice guys' in between, it should be obvious by now that artists and predators aren't mutually exclusive. Sexual predators aren't drooling monsters that hide in caves: they are husbands, fathers, employees, friends and, yes, sometimes artists."

== Podcasting ==
On October 24, 2017, Peck made her first appearance on The Majority Report with Sam Seder where she would later become a contributor. On International Women's Day, 2018, Peck along with co-host Sean KB and producer Matt Lech launched the podcast The Antifada which has since released over 100 episodes to Patreon. Peck left The Majority Report in March 2021, and The Antifada in March 2022. She now hosts Party Girls Pod with Sam Beard.

== Personal life and political activism ==
Peck resides in Brooklyn, New York. She has stated that she is a member of the New York-based Emerge caucus of the Democratic Socialists of America, and a former member of the Libertarian Socialist Caucus.
