= Theodore S. Peck =

United States Army general and Medal of Honor recipient

Theodore Safford Peck
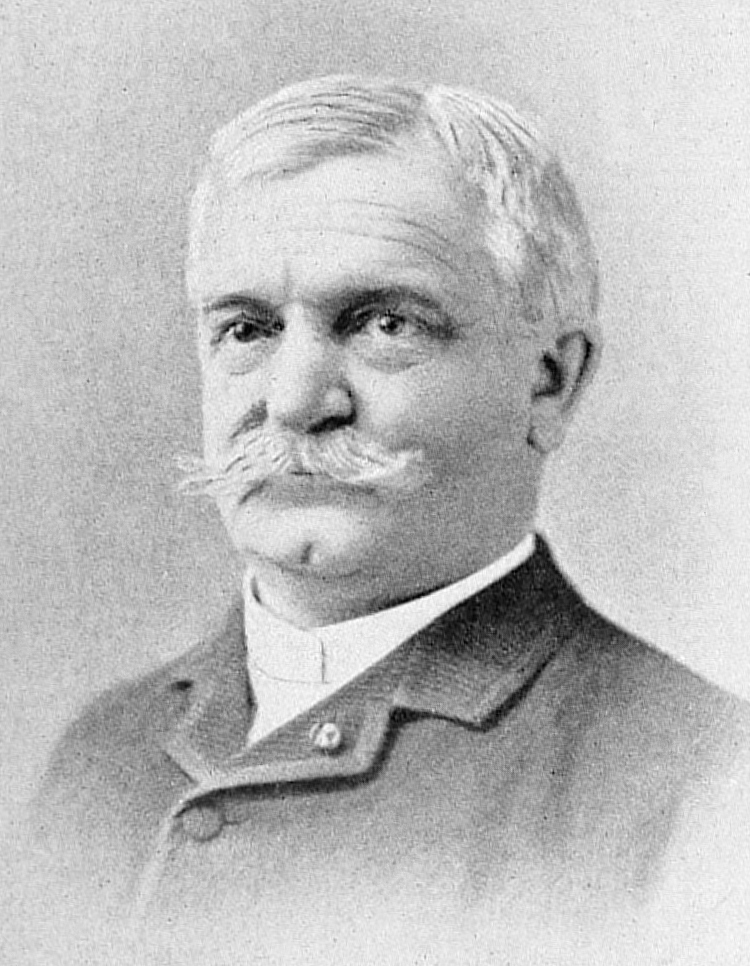
- From 1894's Men of Vermont Illustrated
- Born: March 22, 1843; Burlington, Vermont, US
- Died: March 15, 1918 (aged 74); Burlington, Vermont, US
- Burial place: Lakeview Cemetery, Burlington, Vermont
- Spouse: Agnes Louise Lesslie
- Children: Theodora Agnes Peck
- Military career
- Allegiance: United States
- Branch: United States Army; Vermont National Guard
- Service years: 1861–1865 (Army); 1865–1901 (National Guard)
- Rank: Captain (Army); Brevet Major General (National Guard)
- Commands: 1st Infantry Regiment, Vermont National Guard; Vermont National Guard
- Conflicts: American Civil War
- Awards: Medal of Honor
- Other work: President, T.S. Peck Insurance

Theodore Safford Peck (March 22, 1843 – March 15, 1918) was an American Civil War veteran who received the Medal of Honor. He also attained the rank of major general as Adjutant General of the Vermont National Guard.

== Early life ==
Peck was born in Burlington, Vermont. He attended local schools and was prepared to attend the University of Vermont when he opted instead to enlist for the Civil War. He tried to enlist into the military on four previous occasions, but in every case he was turned down because he was too young.

== Military career ==
In 1861 he applied for military service a fifth time and was appointed a private in Company F, 1st Vermont Volunteer Cavalry.

He took part in engagements at Middletown and Winchester, Virginia, in May, 1862. In June, 1862 he was appointed regimental quartermaster sergeant of the 9th Vermont Volunteer Infantry. He was with the regiment when it was captured at Harper's Ferry in September, 1862. The 9th Vermont was paroled and sent to Camp Douglas (Chicago) in January, 1863, after which it guarded Confederate prisoners.

Peck accepted a commission as a second lieutenant in January, 1863. In March, 1863 the regiment returned to the Army of the Potomac and joined the siege of Suffolk, Virginia. In July and August, 1863 Peck saw action at Yorktown and Gloucester Court House, and he was involved in combat at Young's Crossroads (now Maysville), North Carolina in December, 1863. On February 2, 1864, he took part in an engagement at Newport Barracks, North Carolina, for which he received Medal of Honor. He participated in several other battles throughout 1864 and was promoted to captain. He was wounded at Fort Harrison, Virginia, in September, 1864, but remained with his unit.

In late 1864 and early 1865 Peck assumed temporary command of a battalion in the 9th Vermont, and was then appointed acting regimental quartermaster and adjutant. In late 1864 he also served in New York City as part of a force sent to prevent civil unrest during that year's presidential election. He then moved to 2nd Brigade, 2nd Division, XVIII Army Corps, serving as assistant adjutant general, aide-de-camp and brigade quartermaster. In March, 1865 he was appointed assistant quartermaster of 1st Brigade, 3rd Division, XXIV Army Corps. He was present at the capture of Richmond, and was among first to enter city after it fell. Peck was mustered out in May 1865, having twice declined commissions in the regular Army.

== Medal of Honor action ==
He (Peck) received a medal of honor from Congress for gallantry in action at Newport Barracks, N. C., February 2, 1864.

On that day the Union troops, comprising some seven hundred and fifty men, with one piece of artillery, were attacked by the Confederate General Martin with about five thousand infantry, accompanied by fourteen pieces of artillery and four hundred cavalry, which had outflanked our small force from the commencement of the engagement. The left of the Union line lay near the river, while the right was in the woods and was commanded by 1st Lieutenant T. S. Peck, Company H, 9th Vermont Volunteers. The line was continually pressed back by the enemy, and made eleven different stands before reaching the Newport River, over which there were two bridges, one a railroad bridge, and the other called the "county bridge," located about a quarter mile above the former.

The Confederates pressed so closely that there was barely time to fire the railroad bridge with turpentine and tar. Lieutenant Peck, with his men, was ordered to fire the county bridge, and was told that he would find on the opposite side the bridge-head two companies cavalry with plenty of turpentine and tar for his use as soon as had crossed but the bridge must be burned at all hazards and the enemy prevented from crossing, for it was well known throughout the entire command that their salvation depended upon the burning of both these bridges; if either was left undestroyed and the enemy permitted to cross, the chances were that what was left of the Union forces would be captured. Lieutenant Peck had made a desperate fight all the afternoon, and had been the farthest out toward the enemy the entire time, holding them in check until they had broken through the line on his left. At this time the Union troops had mostly crossed the railroad and county bridges, and were rapidly falling back down the county road toward Beaufort, while Lieutenant Peck's rear guard was hotly engaged with the Confederates who were close at his heels.

He had sent a noncommissioned officer to the bridge to see if everything was in readiness to fire the same after he had crossed it. The sergeant had just reported that there was no tar, no turpentine, and no cavalry; in fact, there was nothing—all had fled. Lieutenant Peck, leaving one half of his men with their officers fighting the enemy, with the other half ran down the hill to the bridge, determined to destroy the same if possible. Finding that some of the planks were not spiked down, he had these torn up, and, being fortunate in finding plenty of dry grass in the vicinity, which his men pulled from the ground, he had the same placed in readiness for burning the bridge, then ordered his men who were fighting to stop firing and rush across. This order was instantly obeyed, although some were killed and wounded in leaving the enemy, who came forward on the run, increasing their musketry fire.

As soon as our men from the hill had crossed the bridge, they commenced firing upon the enemy, while the others of the party ignited the dead grass.

The Confederates brought up a battery and poured in grape and canister, but the rear guard of the 9th stood to the bridge until it was destroyed and the enemy prevented from crossing. The river at this point, although narrow, was very deep, and the enemy was obliged to construct a bridge before crossing the stream, which gave the Union men an advantage of about three hours, and saved the command.

== Medal of Honor citation ==
Citation:

By long and persistent resistance and burning the bridges, kept a superior force of the enemy at bay and covered the retreat of the garrison.

== Business career ==
He was the principal of T.S. Peck Insurance, a Burlington insurance agency that represented fire, life, marine, and accident insurers, and which is still an active agency. T.S. Peck's client base grew throughout Peck's life, and included customers in both Vermont and Canada. He was also involved in many other Burlington business ventures, including serving on the board of directors of the Porter Manufacturing Company, Baldwin Manufacturing Company, Burlington Shade Roller Company, and Powell Manufacturing Company.

== Civic and fraternal memberships ==
Peck was an active member of the Grand Army of the Republic, the Military Order of the Loyal Legion of the United States, and the Reunion Society of Vermont Officers. He was also a member of the Society of the Army of the Potomac and served as commander of the Medal of Honor Legion of the United States.

Peck was also an original incorporator of the National Society and a member of the Vermont Society of the Sons of the American Revolution. In addition, he was active in the Society of Colonial Wars, General Society of the War of 1812, Military Order of Foreign Wars, Masons, Odd Fellows, Knights of Pythias, Ethan Allen Club, Algonquin Club of Burlington, and Lake Champlain Yacht Club. Peck was also a Freemason and served for ten years as the Vermont lodge's Masonic grand master.

In 1891 Peck was appointed to the United States Military Academy Board of Visitors by President Benjamin Harrison. In 1896, he received an honorary degree from Norwich University.

== Post Civil War military career ==
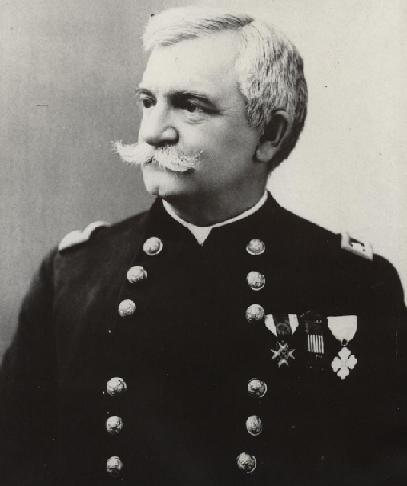
General Peck as Adjutant General of the Vermont National Guard, circa 1890

Peck joined the Vermont National Guard after the Civil War and served in various command and staff positions, attaining the rank of lieutenant colonel. From 1870 to 1872 Peck served as chief of staff to Governor John Stewart with the rank of colonel. He was subsequently appointed commander of the Vermont National Guard's 1st Infantry Regiment.

Peck succeeded James Stevens Peck (no relation) as Adjutant General of the Vermont National Guard with the rank of brigadier general, and served from 1881 to 1901, later receiving promotion to brevet major general to recognize his superior performance.

== Death and burial ==
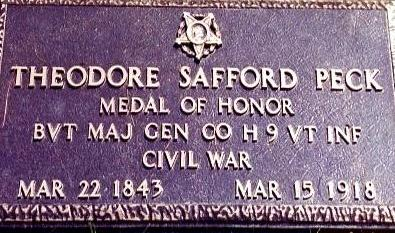
Grave marker, Lakeview Cemetery, Burlington

Peck died in Burlington on March 15, 1918, and was buried in Burlington's Lakeview Cemetery, Pine Area, Lot 6.

General Peck's grave is near that of George Jerrison Stannard, who had been Peck's commander in the 9th Vermont.

== Other ==
Theodore S. Peck married Agnes Louise Lesslie (July 29, 1843 – November 15, 1917) of Toronto, Ontario, Canada on October 29, 1879. She was active in several civic and fraternal organizations, including the American Home Missionary Society and the Daughters of the American Revolution.

Their daughter Theodora Agnes Peck (October 25, 1882 – January 11, 1964) was a well-known poet and author. Her works included the 1900 poem A Dream of the Flag and three novels; 1907's Hester of the Grants: A Romance of Old Bennington; 1908's The Sword of Dundee: A Tale of Bonnie Prince Charlie; and 1914's White Dawn: A Legend of Ticonderoga.

== See also ==
- List of American Civil War Medal of Honor recipients: M–P

== Notes ==
Military offices
Preceded by James Stevens Peck	Vermont Adjutant General; 1881–1900	Succeeded by William H. Gilmore
