= Matt Bernstein (internet personality) =

American makeup artist and activist (born 1998)

- Born: October 16, 1998 (age 28); New Jersey, U.S.
- Occupations: Content creator; podcaster; activist; makeup artist

Instagram information
- Page: mattxiv
- Followers: 2.4 million

YouTube information
- Channel: @mattbernstein1
- Subscribers: 454 thousand
- Last updated: 19 September 2026

Matthew Bernstein (born October 16, 1998) is an American content creator, makeup artist, and activist. Bernstein became an internet celebrity because of his (Note: Bernstein uses both he/him and they/them pronouns. This article uses he/him for consistency.) social media posts, which largely consist of infographics and photographs of makeup looks that comment on social and political issues, mainly those that affect the LGBTQ+ community. He hosts the podcast A Bit Fruity with Matt Bernstein.

== Early and personal life ==
Bernstein was born on October 16, 1998, and grew up in Westfield, New Jersey, a suburb of New York City. He was raised Jewish. He attended Westfield High School and New York University Tisch School of the Arts.

Bernstein is gay, which he realized at the age of ten. He did not come out until he was fifteen, due to fears relating to his family’s opinions and religion. However, his parents were ultimately accepting, and he has a good relationship with them. Bernstein is an anti-Zionist, citing the state of Israel's ethnoreligious hierarchy which excludes Palestinians.

== Career ==
Bernstein won PinkNews’ Influencer of the Year award in 2022 and was recognized on the Out100 list in 2024.

=== Social media ===
Bernstein began experimenting with makeup soon after coming out at age 15, first only using Wite-Out to paint his nails before eventually exploring eye shadow and eyeliner. Prompted by the 2016 United States presidential election of Donald Trump, Bernstein began to photograph himself wearing makeup and body art that highlighted issues affecting the LGBTQ+ community. Featured on his face, arms, or chest, Bernstein’s art often included bright and rainbow colors combined with bold-lettered text that highlights LGBTQ+ issues. He posted these photos on Instagram under the handle @mattxiv; he has used the platform since 2012 to promote his freelance photography.

In late 2021, Bernstein's Instagram content shifted toward collage-style infographics discussing current events and political issues. During the Gaza war, Bernstein has posted pro-Palestine content on his social media leading to backlash from some pro-Israel organizations and influencers. Bernstein's social media content has been shared by celebrities including Demi Lovato and Lili Reinhart. In September 2025, Ariana Grande shared one of his posts asking pro-Donald Trump voters if their lives had improved since Trump took office. The White House released a statement directly addressing Grande and defending Trump.

In 2025, Bernstein endorsed Zohran Mamdani as candidate for New York City mayor and featured him on his Instagram account.

=== Podcast ===
In 2023, he started a podcast called A Bit Fruity, discussing internet culture and left wing politics. Bernstein's podcast has featured several collaborations with LGBT creators such as Vivian Wilson, ContraPoints and Kat Blaque. Journalists Taylor Lorenz and Kat Tenbarge are his most frequent collaborators. He also interviewed Yona Roseman, a trans Israeli woman, about her refusal of mandatory service in the Israel Defense Forces.

In 2026, Bernstein and Emma Vigeland held an interview with Michigan Senate candidate Mallory McMorrow, in which McMorrow defended US support for the Iron Dome during the Gaza war. After McMorrow said, "I don't think anybody should live in fear of being bombed or killed," Vigeland sarcastically asked whether Palestinians should have their own Iron Dome, and McMorrow replied that the idea was worth discussing.

=== Other appearances ===
Bernstein appeared in Reclaim the Flag (2025), a documentary created by Alexis Bittar about LGBTQ people's views of the American flag.

== Style ==
Bernstein's social media posts comment on topics related to current events, left-wing politics, LGBTQ rights, and internet culture. His collage-style posts usually consist of several slides with text and graphics atop a blue and pink gradient background. Many posts include Bernstein's opinions on news and discussions of his personal identity. He told Teen Vogue in 2024: "[I like to] be very clear about my feelings… and explain exactly why I have those feelings… and not pretend that I’m some unbiased arbiter of information — because those don’t exist."
