= Legion of Valor of the United States of America =

Organization of U.S. war veterans

Legion of Valor
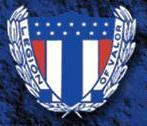
- Emblem
- Formation: April 23, 1890
- Founded at: Washington, D.C.
- Type: 501(c)(19), war veterans' organization
- Legal status: Federally chartered corporation
- Headquarters: Fairfax, Virginia
- Official language: English
- National Commander: Justin Lehew
- National Adjutant: Donald Marx
- Website: legionofvalor.com
- Formerly called: Army and Navy Legion of Valor of the United States of America

The Legion of Valor of the United States of America, commonly known as the Legion of Valor, is a war veterans' organization created to promote patriotic allegiance, fidelity to the United States Constitution, and popular support for civil liberties and the permanence of free institutions. Membership is open to recipients of the Medal of Honor, the Distinguished Service Cross, the Navy Cross, and the Air Force Cross.

== History ==
In 1890 the Medal of Honor Legion was organized by Civil War and Indian Wars Medal of Honor recipients.

At the end of the nineteenth century Civil War veterans began to seek recognition of their prior service and heroism in requesting awards of the Medal of Honor, which had been created in 1862. At the same time, recipients of the Medal of Honor recognized that the Grand Army of the Republic and other veterans' organizations had begun presenting awards that resembled the Medal of Honor, and that a large number of impostors were pretending to be war heroes. As a result, the Medal of Honor Legion was created to protect the integrity of the award by lobbying for changes including the creation of a centralized roster of recipients, and to investigate individuals claiming to have received the award, so that pretenders could be exposed and awards that had been erroneously presented could be revoked.

Following the Spanish–American War membership was expanded to include Medal of Honor recipients of that conflict and the Philippine–American War.

In 1910, a dispute over who would be eligible for membership led Daniel Sickles and several other members of the Medal of Honor Legion to leave and form a new group, the Military Order of the Medal of Honor.

After the end of World War I in 1918, the Medal of Honor Legion again expanded membership to include military members who had received the Distinguished Service Cross.

Membership was again expanded in 1933 to include recipients of the Navy Cross, and the name of the organization was changed to The Army and Navy Legion of Valor.

The successor organization to the Military Order of the Medal of Honor, the Congressional Medal of Honor Society, became active in the late 1940s and was federally chartered in 1958.

When the Air Force Cross was created in 1961, recipients of this award were made eligible for membership, and the name was changed to the Legion of Valor of the United States of America.

== Governance ==
The Legion of Valor is administered by elected officers, including a national commander and two vice commanders, as well as a board of directors. Past national commanders hold lifetime positions on the board of directors.

== National Convention ==
The Legion of Valor meets annually to conduct board of directors meetings, elect officers, and review and amend its constitution.

== Programs ==
Silver Cross for Heroism In 1957 the Legion of Valor created a Silver Cross to recognize actions involving the saving or preservation of life. In 1989 the Legion of Valor's constitution was amended to allow Silver Cross recipients to become associate members.

Bronze Cross for Achievement Established in 1951, the Bronze Cross for Achievement rewards cadets from the Reserve Officers Training Corps who demonstrate "excellence in military, scholastic, and civic affairs."

== Museum ==
In August 1991 the Legion of Valor established the Legion of Valor Veterans Museum. Located in Fresno, California, the museum contains military memorabilia, artifacts, photographs, and official citations.
