= Bartcop =

American political blogger

bartcop
- Website type: Political / social commentary
- Owner: bartcop
- Creator: bartcop
- Website: http://www.bartcop.com
- Commercial: Yes
- Registration: Optional (required for forums, paid subscription required for radio show)
- Launched: February 25, 1996; 30 years ago
- Current status: Inactive

bartcop (born Terrence R. Coppage September 12, 1953 - March 5, 2014) was a liberal blogger from Tulsa, Oklahoma, active on the web since 1996 who produced his own internet radio show beginning in 2004. On his death he received many tributes from the liberal blogosphere.

bartcop.com consisted of humorous political commentary from a liberal perspective. Scathing criticism of the Republicans, and sometimes Democrats in signature bartcop "rants" were a main draw of the site. Although a serious political commentator (i.e., his site is not satire), bartcop sometimes described himself as primarily a comedian. The constant witticisms and humor that defined his page gained him a large and loyal readership.

bartcop was an ardent Bill Clinton loyalist. He supported Hillary Clinton's bid for the presidency in 2008, and had been an outspoken opponent of Barack Obama, splitting with the majority of the liberal Blogosphere and causing much controversy from late 2007 up until June 2008, when Sen. Obama secured enough delegates to carry his party's nomination. Since then, bartcop threw full support behind Sen. Obama.

== Overview ==
Before the internet, World Wide Web, and the "blogosphere" gained popularity, bartcop was a frequent poster in Prodigy discussion groups. After gaining a formidable following bartcop began publishing an opt-in email Newsletter titled "Rush Limba, Lying Nazi Whore" with the name, a reference to conservative talk radio host Rush Limbaugh, intentionally spelling his last name phonetically. bartcop.com was established in February 1996. bartcop.com now is the masthead for several websites as well as a radio show, available to financial supporters of bartcop.com. Many of the site's readers frequent the #bartcop IRC chat room.

In the 2004 Democratic Primary, bartcop gave some support to Dennis Kucinich and Howard Dean before finally endorsing Wesley Clark, both because of his military credentials and his closeness to Clinton. bartcop's endorsement of Clark in the primary helped Clark win Oklahoma where bartcop lived and voted. Immediately after Clark's departure from the race, bartcop followed Clark in endorsing John Kerry.

In 2008 bartcop endorsed Hillary Clinton, and spent most of the primary season battling it out with Barack Obama supporters. He opposed the less experienced Obama, contending that nominating Obama would guarantee a loss in the general election. bartcop's often-stated message was a variation on: "If our goal is to nominate a Black man, we should go with Obama. But what if our goal is to win the White House?"

bartcop later reversed course, praising Obama for how he had handled attacks coming from the right:

Subject: you OK with Obama?

bartcop... at some point, do you think you might be able to admit that this guy is gonna be better than you could have hoped for?

He isn't cowering, he's fighting back, and he is better at it than any Dem candidate you've seen in quite awhile.

Keep on swinging. South Side Rob

I'll admit it right now. I'm impressed with the way he's handled things since the merge.

At this point, it's hard to say if he's that good or McCain's that bad, but the real test will be his reaction when the whore press turns on him.

A long-running feature of the page was to publish the text of angry e-mails sent in by opponents, which Bart called "monkey mail". He posted the emails and replied point by point with derisive and humorous commentary. However, the lack of a dedicated comments facility has led to claims of censorship or even a dishonest 'framing' of comments.

bartcop liked to end each issue with an image of Shirley Manson from the band Garbage. Ironically Manson said that she likes to read Salon.com, a rival liberal blog.

In 2002, Salon.com infamously fingered Coppage and Marc Perkel as the authors behind the anonymously-published Media Whores Online, a conclusion both vehemently denied. MWO had always linked directly to bartcop's site and an essay of his, The Myth of the Liberal Media, as a kind of mission statement. To this day MWO's author remains unidentified.

== Political views ==
bartcop was an outspoken critic of the American media and addressed the perception of liberal bias in a page long article entitled "The Myth of the Liberal Media." Many issues feature quotes from journalists he considered to be fawning over government policy. bartcop often called these journalists "whores", a perception he claimed has been reinforced by revelations about commentator Armstrong Williams and Jeff Gannon. To reinforce these criticisms, pictures of the faces of prominent journalists are superimposed on tops of bodies of women dressed as prostitutes. (Photoshopped images are commonly used on the site to make points humorously).

bartcop was known to take controversial stances on some issues. He criticized Zionist Jews for putting a higher priority on their "sacred sand" than on the lives of their children. His proposed solution to the Israeli–Palestinian conflict is for all Jews to leave Israel and take up residence in the United States (specifically Oklahoma). This view has generated a great deal of critical mail from liberal Jewish readers, but bartcop noted that he also opposed Palestinian suicide bombers and has spoken out against anti-Semites. He tended to be critical of religion in general (often using the phrase "religiously insane" when referring to the Religious Right). He characterized devout followers of any religious creed as superstitious. He used the phrase "Invisible Cloud Being" as a way of characterizing the personal God popular in monotheism.

Unlike many liberals, bartcop was opposed to complete gun control, though he has stated that if David Koresh is a "10" on this scale, then he is a "3."

bartcop was vocal in his support of the U.S. military and had many heated expletive-laced debates with readers whom he views as insulting the troops. He said that Bush betrayed the troops and the country by ordering the invasion of Iraq for what he perceived as the wrong reasons, and he kept a running tally of soldiers killed in the war. Previously a supporter of the political cartoons of Ted Rall (bartcop had referred to Rall as "my good friend Ted Rall" in the past), he broke all connection and publicly denounced Rall in May 2004 after Rall published a cartoon mocking Pat Tillman. bartcop dedicated an entire issue of his online magazine to Rall's cartoon, publishing his views and the views of many readers who sent in email on the subject. bartcop viewed the cartoon as an insult to a brave soldier, and was upset that Rall did not distinguish between the war in Afghanistan, which bartcop generally considered a worthy cause, and the War in Iraq, which he did not. Nonetheless, bartcop still occasionally included Rall's comics in his material.

bartcop went on record as supporting "the Democratic Front-runner in 2008," which was Hillary Clinton for most of the campaign. As a part of this support, he routinely posted editorials by liberals who opposed Clinton (Replacing the titles of their pieces with "Why I Hate Her" or similar) and then rebutted them. The rise of Barack Obama and the rise of attacks from the Left on the Clintons upset bartcop a great deal, and he dedicated much energy in the 2008 primary season to promoting and defending Clinton and berating Obama and his supporters. bartcop believed Obama could not win the General Election, and therefore nominating him was a terrible idea which would guarantee another Republican victory. This led to major infighting on the liberal Blogosphere, and causing many friendships and political alliances to be severed. Despite the 6-months-plus of daily infighting, bartcop stated repeatedly that he would support whoever the 2008 Democratic nominee would be, and did so once Sen. Obama had secured the nomination.

bartcop's non-political obsessions included Chinaco Anejo Tequila, poker, bixby corn, and Shirley Manson. bartcop was also an avid fan of the music of Led Zeppelin, particularly guitarist Jimmy Page. bartcop was less enthusiastic about vocalist Robert Plant's solo career.

== Sources ==
- Liberto, Jennifer. "Media Whores Online" , Salon.com. June 3, 2002. (Requires premium subscription.) LISTSERV 16.0 - Archives - Error
