= Pilot Season (TV series) =

2004 American TV series

- Genre: Comedy
- Written by: Charles Fisher; Sam Seder
- Directed by: Sam Seder
- Starring: Sarah Silverman
- Composers: Dave Derby; Michael Kotch
- Country of origin: United States
- Original language: English
- No. of seasons: 1
- No. of episodes: 6

Production
- Executive producers: Charles Fisher; Sam Seder
- Producers: Michael Shea; Ivan Victor
- Cinematography: T.W. Li
- Editors: Jeremy Reuben; Ivan Victor
- Running time: 180 min.

Original release
- Network: Trio
- Release: September 6 – September 10, 2004

Pilot Season is a television miniseries written by Charles Fisher and Sam Seder, directed by Seder, and starring Sarah Silverman. The show followed on from the 1997 film Who's the Caboose?, which was also written by Fisher and Seder with Silverman playing the lead. Pilot Season stars Silverman in her original role as Susan Underman and was broadcast in 2004 on the Trio cable network.

== Episodes ==
1. "Hope Springs Eternal"
2. "Comeback Kid"
3. "And Just for All"
4. "Reems of Fun"
5. "Cat Fight"
6. "Reunited"
