= James Stevens Peck =

American lawyer (1838–1884)

James S. Peck
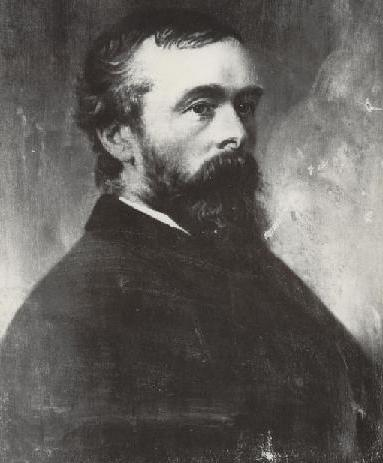
- On file at Vermont General Services Administration, Public Records Division. On display at Vermont National Guard Headquarters in Colchester.

Postmaster of Montpelier, Vermont
- In office 1881–1884
- Preceded by: John W. Clark
- Succeeded by: George W. Wing

Vermont Adjutant General
- In office 1872–1881
- Preceded by: William W. Wells
- Succeeded by: Theodore S. Peck

Personal details
- Born: December 6, 1838 Montpelier, Vermont, U.S.
- Died: May 28, 1884 (aged 45) Loon Lake, New York
- Resting place: Green Mount Cemetery, Montpelier, Vermont
- Party: Republican
- Spouse: Ellen Mary Blake (m. 1869–1884, his death)
- Education: University of Vermont
- Occupation: Attorney

James Stevens Peck (December 6, 1838 – May 28, 1884) was a Vermont attorney and military leader who served in the 13th and 17th Vermont Infantry Regiments during the American Civil War and as Adjutant General of the Vermont National Guard.

== Early life ==
James S. Peck was born in Montpelier, Vermont, on December 6, 1838. He graduated from the University of Vermont in 1860, and studied law with Lucius Benedict Peck and Stoddard B. Colby.

== Civil War ==
In 1862 Peck was commissioned a second lieutenant in Company I, 13th Vermont Infantry. He rose to the post of regimental adjutant, and took part in the regiment's combat actions, including the Battle of Gettysburg.

After the 13th Vermont was mustered out, Peck joined the 17th Vermont as adjutant with the rank of major. He was commended for bravery at Wilderness, Cold Harbor, and Petersburg, and mustered out with the regiment in 1865.

== Career ==
In 1866 Peck was admitted to the bar and established a law practice in Montpelier.

From 1866 to 1880 he served as a member of the city's volunteer fire department.

A Republican, from 1868 to 1872 he served as assistant secretary of the Vermont Senate, and from 1869 to 1880 Peck was Assistant United States Attorney for Vermont.

In 1881 Peck was appointed Postmaster in Montpelier, a position he held until his death.

== Continued military service ==
Peck served as assistant adjutant general and inspector general of the Vermont National Guard with the rank of brigadier general from 1868 to 1872, during the tenure of Adjutant General William Wells. Peck succeeded Wells and served as adjutant general from 1872 to 1881.

He was an original member of the Reunion Society of Vermont Officers. Peck was the society's secretary from 1866 to 1882, and president from 1882 until his death.

== Death and burial ==
Peck was in poor health for several years as a result of his wartime service, and he nearly died twice from pulmonary hemorrhages. He died while vacationing at Loon Lake, New York, on May 28, 1884. Peck is buried at Green Mount Cemetery in Montpelier.

Military offices
Preceded by William W. Wells	Vermont Adjutant General; 1872–1881	Succeeded by Theodore S. Peck
