= Sam Seder =

American actor and talk radio host (born 1966)

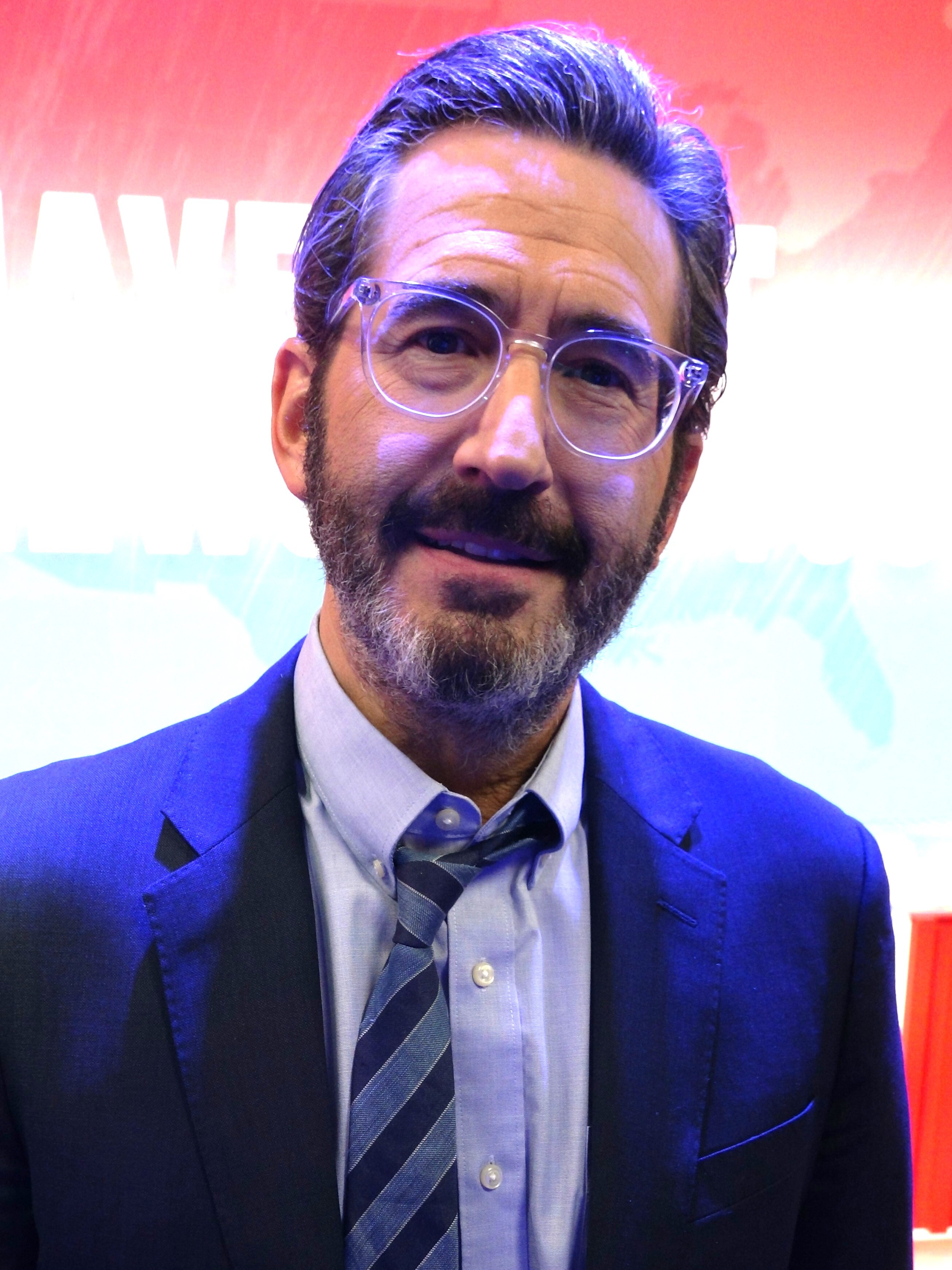
- Seder in 2025
- Born: November 28, 1966 (age 59); New York City, U.S.
- Education: Connecticut College (BA); Boston University (incomplete)
- Occupations: Actor; political commentator; media host; scriptwriter
- Years active: 1987–present
- Notable work: F.U.B.A.R.: America's Right-Wing Nightmare (2006)
- Political party: Democratic
- Spouse: Nicole Cattell (m. 2008; div. 2017)
- Children: 2

YouTube information
- Channel: The Majority Report w/Sam Seder
- Years active: 2010–present
- Genres: Politics; news; humor; debate; interview; live call-in
- Subscribers: 2.13 million
- Views: 1.58 billion
- Last updated: 15 August 2026

Samuel Lincoln Seder (/ˈsiːdər/; born November 28, 1966) is an American actor and progressive political commentator. His works include the film Who's the Caboose? (1997) as well as the television shows Beat Cops (2001) and Pilot Season (2004). He also appeared in Next Stop Wonderland (1998) and made guest appearances on Spin City (1997), Sex and the City (2000), America Undercover (2005), and Maron (2015). Since 2010, he has hosted a daily political talk show, The Majority Report with Sam Seder. He also voices Harold Cranwinkle and Hugo, recurring characters on the animated comedy series Bob's Burgers.

== Early life and education ==
Seder was born on November 28, 1966, in New York City, to a Jewish family, and raised in Worcester, Massachusetts, and is the oldest of three children. His father, J. Robert Seder, was a lawyer in Worcester. Seder earned a Bachelor of Arts degree in Religious Studies from Connecticut College and enrolled at Boston University School of Law. Disillusioned by the school's commercialized culture, he dropped out of studying law to pursue a career in comedy. Seder became involved in the Boston comedy scene, associating with Janeane Garofalo, David Cross, Marc Maron and Sarah Silverman, whom he dated. These connections were used in his first film, Who's the Caboose?, which then led to Seder's appearances on comedy TV shows.

== Personal life ==
Seder and his former wife Nicole Cattell have two children. On April 27, 2018, Seder announced that the couple were separated. He later announced they had divorced. Seder is a Reform Jew and is opposed to religious fundamentalism and theocracy, but says he has no issue with religion otherwise.

== Career ==
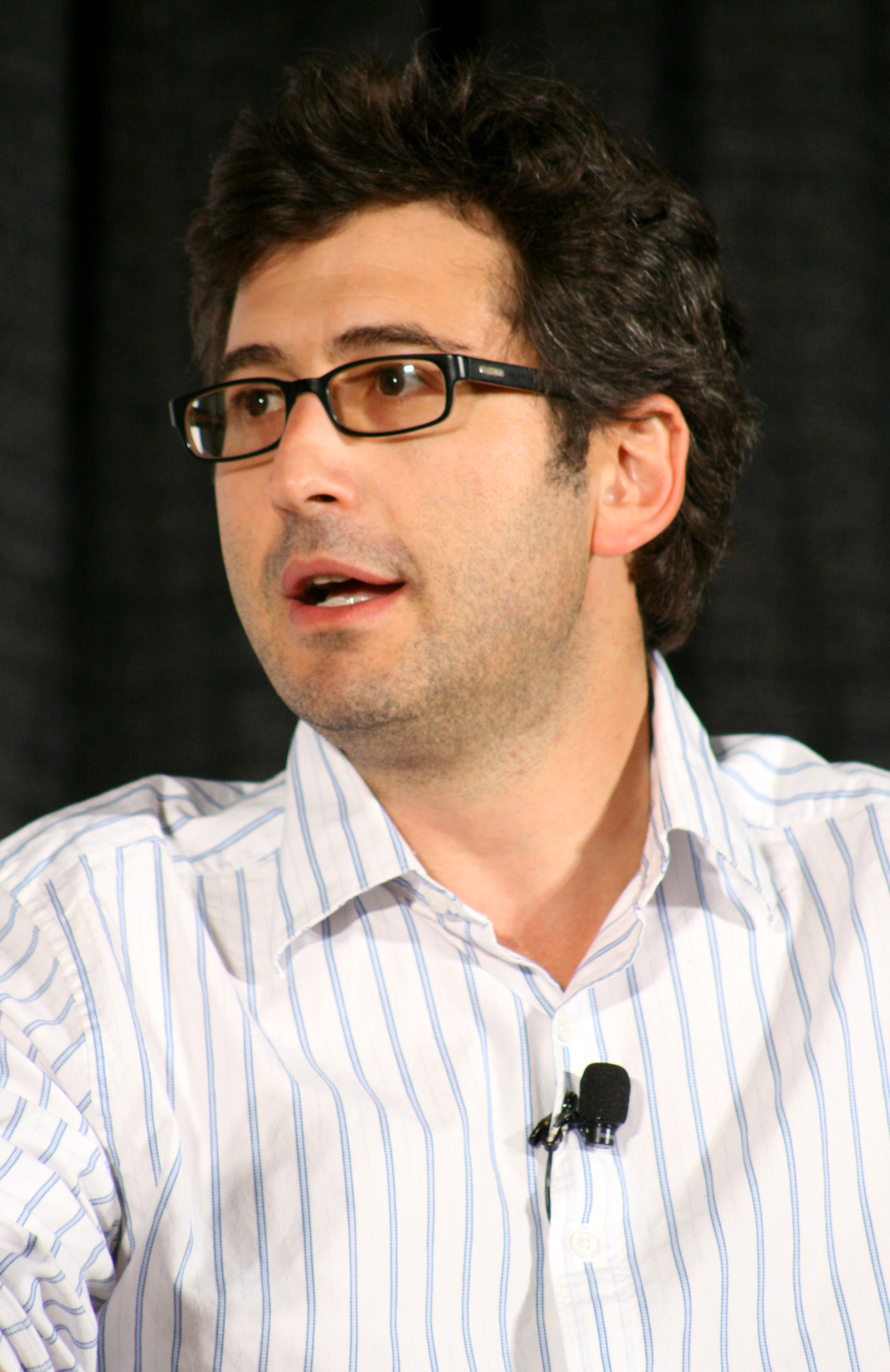
Seder in 2008

In March 2004, Seder became co-host of Air America Radio's The Majority Report. Seder cohosted with Janeane Garofalo until July 2006. During Mark Green's restructuring plan to transform Air America into a profitable leader in progressive talk radio, called "Air America 2.0", The Sam Seder Show was canceled on April 13, 2007, and replaced by WOR Radio Network late night radio show host Lionel. Seder was relegated to a Sunday show entitled Seder on Sunday. Lionel soon lost two-thirds of Seder's live affiliates and listenership. The final Seder on Sunday was broadcast on June 1, 2008.

Seder occasionally substituted for Randi Rhodes when Rhodes was on Air America, as well as Mike Malloy on The Mike Malloy Show on the Nova M Radio network. In 2008 he also began a collaboration with Marc Maron on Maron v. Seder, an hour-long video webcast. In January 2009, Maron v. Seder was renamed Breakroom Live with Maron & Seder and aired live from the kitchen in the Air America offices weekdays. Seder and Maron also hosted a post-show chat with viewers after each episode. Air America Media cancelled Breakroom Live with Maron & Seder in July 2009. In 2010, Air America was shut down.

In November 2009, Seder hosted a pilot for NBC of an American version of Have I Got News for You. Three years later, in November 2012, it was announced Seder would again be the host of an American version of the show, this time on TBS. In November 2010, Seder began an independent online podcast, called The Seder Channel (later renamed The Majority Report w/Sam Seder). The live talk-show format closely matches the previous Air America program, with politically oriented commentary by Seder and co-hosts, and interviews with various guests. Seder offers listeners different tiered levels of access to content around the show via crowdfunding platform Patreon.

In late 2010, Seder began occasionally serving as substitute host of Countdown with Keith Olbermann when Olbermann was on vacation. In December 2010, Seder also became co-host of the nationally syndicated progressive radio interview program Ring of Fire, co-hosted by Farron Cousins and Florida-based attorney Mike Papantonio. Seder also worked as a political contributor for MSNBC.

The Majority Report was co-hosted by Michael Brooks from 2012–2020 and with Emma Vigeland since 2023. The Majority Report was associated with the TYT Network, with which the show partnered, from the 2010 relaunch until 2020, which generally followed its original format but was rebooted as a viewer-funded production. Following those structural affiliation and funding-production changes, the show won a string of international People's Choice Podcast Awards, in five of the next seven annual competitions (2011, 2012, 2013, 2015, and 2017), for the "News and Politics" award.

In March 2025, Seder appeared in an episode of the Jubilee Media web show Surrounded, in which he challenged 20 Donald Trump supporters to a debate. The video, which had been filmed in January, quickly became viral and gained millions of views within days, with commentary focusing on fringe views espoused by Seder's opponents.

=== 2017 tweet controversy ===
In 2009, to criticize petitions seeking Roman Polanski's release from rape charges, Seder tweeted "Dont care re Polanski, but i hope if my daughter is ever raped it is by an older truly talented man w/ a great sense of mise en scene". In 2017, Mike Cernovich called attention to the tweet and contacted multiple journalists asking them to write about it. As a result, MSNBC initially decided not to renew Seder's contract despite Seder explaining that the tweet was satire. Shortly afterward, MSNBC reversed its decision after getting pushback from journalists, and MSNBC's president said the initial decision to part ways had been wrong.

== Filmography ==
=== Film ===
Year	Title	Role	Notes
1997	Who's the Caboose?	Max	Also director and writer
1997	The Big Fall	Gary Snider	Direct-to-video
1998	Next Stop Wonderland	Kevin Monteiro	
2000	Happy Accidents	Ned	
2000	Endsville	Wood Salesman	
2004	Beacon Hill	Rafe Coulter	
2008	The Bad Situationist	Arthur Lieberman	Also director and co-writer
2017	Fits and Starts	Dressler	
2022	The Bob's Burgers Movie	Hugo Habercore	

=== Television ===
Year	Title	Role	Notes
1995	All-American Girl	Phil	Episode: "Young Americans"
1995	Party of Five	Greg	Episode: "Best Laid Plans"
1996	The Show	Tom Delaney	8 episodes
1996	Boys & Girls	David Waits	Television film
1997	Spin City	George / Bogus Temp	2 episodes
1997	The Magic School Bus	Voice	Episode: "In the City"
1998	Grown-Ups	Phil	Television film
1999	The Dick & Paula Celebrity Special	William Clark	Episode: "Merriweather Lewis and Curly Howard"
1999	Pulp Comics: Louis C.K.'s Filthy Stupid Talent Show	Seth the Jew	Television short
2000	Sex and the City	Lew	Episode: "Sex and Another City"
2002–2004	Home Movies	Fenton Mulley / Cho / Paula's Father	12 episodes; voice role
2004	Pilot Season	Max Rabin	2 episodes
2005	Wonder Showzen	Bug	Episode: "Patience"
2005–2007	Lucy, the Daughter of the Devil	Special Father #2 / The Senator	11 episodes; voice role
2006	O'Grady	Mr. Chip Hurley	Episode: "A Stronger O'Grady"
2006	Cheap Seats: Without Ron Parker	Sir Aglovale	Episode: "Unbelievable Sports 1"
2008	Assy McGee	Principal Jenkins / Douche	2 episodes; voice role
2011–present	Bob's Burgers	Hugo Habercore / Harold Cranwinkle / Al Genarro	32 episodes; voice role
2015	Maron	Sam Seder	Episode: "Patent Troll"
2017	The Good Fight	Vaughn Yenko	Episode: "Stoppable: Requiem for an Airdate"

== See also ==
- The Majority Report with Sam Seder with Michael Brooks and Emma Vigeland
- The Young Turks
