= KCLU =

KCLU may refer to:

- KCLU (AM), a radio station (1340 AM) licensed to Santa Barbara, California, United States
- KCLU-FM, a radio station (88.3 FM) licensed to Thousand Oaks, California, United States
- KDAA, a radio station (103.1) licensed to Rolla, Missouri, United States (formerly known as KCLU-FM)
