= Coiro =

Coiro is a surname. Notable people with the surname include:

- Angie Coiro (21st century), American radio personality
- Eloisa Coiro (born 2000); Italian middle-distance runner
- Kat Coiro, American film director, producer, and screenwriter
- Rhys Coiro (born 1979), American actor

== See also ==
- Corio (surname)
