= Gia'na Garel =

American writer and producer

Gia'na Garel is a writer, producer, filmmaker, composer and entertainment consultant based in New York City. From 2005 to 2009, she co-hosted an entertainment-oriented Air America Radio program, On the Real, with pioneer rap artist Chuck D.

In addition to screenwriting, she is author of the essay "The Sound of Freedom", co-wrote the essay "Record of Failure" with Chuck D, and had a show transcript: DMC; published in the 2006 New York Times bestselling anthology The Air America Playbook... alongside such personalities as Rachel Maddow, Al Franken, Janeane Garofalo, David Bender, and Robert F. Kennedy Jr.

She was mentioned in a roll call of female filmmakers in the books Black American Cinema by Manthia Diawara; and in Deep Sightings & Rescue Missions: Fiction, Essays, & Conversations by Toni Cade Bambara – edited by Toni Morrison.

Traveling internationally from the Middle East to Eastern Europe, she compiled audio documentaries and interviews, such as with Holocaust survivor Eva Kor on forgiveness and world peace, for her indie radio segments—"Everywhere with Gia’na Garel", in addition to others on music.

As of 2014, she also began announcing and voicing for Progressive Voices Network.
