= Ring of Fire (radio program) =

Cast and voices
- Hosted by: Farron Cousins; Mike Papantonio; Sam Seder; Jerrod Zisser

Music
- Opening theme: "Ring of Fire" by Social Distortion

Publication
- Original release: May 1, 2004
- Provider: Air America (2004–2010)

Related
- Website: trofire.com

Ring of Fire is a progressive American podcast currently hosted by Josh Gay. The show was formerly a talk radio program hosted by Mike Papantonio and Sam Seder. The show focuses on:

"exposing Wall Street thugs, environmental criminality, corporate media failure and political backstories rarely found in the mainstream media". The show has been on the air since 2004, first as a radio program and then moving to a podcast-only format.

J Michael Papantonio is an attorney specializing in mass torts, litigation and is senior partner at the Levin Papantonio Law Firm. Seder is an actor, comedian, director and political commentator who hosts The Majority Report. In 2013, Ring of Fire expanded into a television program airing weeknights on venues such as Free Speech TV, that was hosted by Papantonio and Cousins. In 2025, Farron Cousins announced that he will be leaving the Ring of Fire network. In 2026, Josh Gay was announced as the new full time host.

== Production ==
Producer – Scott Millican Ring of Fire airs Saturdays from 3 p.m. – 6 p.m. ET. Papantonio does the show from the Pensacola studio while Seder's studio is near The New York Times Building in New York City. The program's theme song, "Ring of Fire," originally by Johnny Cash, is performed by Social Distortion.

== History ==
Facility space was allocated in December 2003 and Ring of Fire aired its first broadcast on May 1, 2004, on the newly founded Air America radio network. It remained there until the network closed almost six years later. Dial Global then picked up the program and has syndicated it since. The radio program was featured in the 2006 documentary film Jesus Camp.

The original cohost for Ring of Fire, along with Mike Papantonio, was Robert F. Kennedy Jr., when the show started on Air America Radio in 2004. Kennedy continued to be one of the expanding number of hosts on Ring of Fire until the COVID-19 pandemic spread around the world in 2020, when his outspoken anti-vaccine views put him at odds with the other hosts and most listeners, leading to his departure.

David Bender, who hosted another Air America program, Politically Direct, first appeared on the show when Air America 2.0 was launched in May 2007. Bender returned to the program as a full-time host after the network closed down, but announced on December 11, 2010, that he was again stepping away from the program; Seder announced on The Majority Report podcast December 17, 2010, that he would be Bender's replacement.

== The Ring of Fire Network ==
In 2015, the show became officially known as The Ring of Fire Network, and began focusing heavily on progressive political content. Numerous hosts now appear on the show, including Papantonio, Thom Hartmann, Abby Martin, Laura Flanders, Sam Seder, David Pakman, Lee Camp, and Mike Malloy. Many of the network's personalities are also veteran personalities for other networks, including Free Speech TV, RT and TeleSUR. Also in 2015, the show began a separate site called Drug Safety News for the "specific purpose of highlighting political maneuvers the pharmaceutical industry is taking to influence government decisions, and to expose the dangers and lack of effectiveness of many of the products the industry is marketing."
