= Springer on the Radio =

- Country of origin: United States
- Language: English
- Home station: WCKY, WSAI
- Starring: Jerry Springer
- Recording studio: Cincinnati, Ohio, United States
- Original release: January 17, 2005 – December 5, 2006

Springer on the Radio was an American radio program broadcast from WCKY and later WSAI in Cincinnati from January 17, 2005 to December 5, 2006 and syndicated nationally on the Air America Radio network from April 1, 2005 to September 18, 2006 when it moved to Air America syndication, meaning that it was still syndicated nationally, but not on the Air America network lineup.

It was hosted by Jerry Springer, best known as a TV talk show host. Springer is a former Democratic politician (formerly Cincinnati’s mayor) still active in the party organization. His radio show focused on the day's news with a liberal and progressive standpoint. It aired on weekdays from 9:00 a.m. to 12:00 p.m. ET on select Air America radio stations. Executive Producer, Stephanie Cornett (formerly Tyler) and technical producer Paul Mason. The theme on all Friday shows was called Freedom Fridays, allowing callers to talk about whatever topic they desired. On the other days of the week, callers were only allowed to comment on what Springer was discussing.

== Political aspects ==
Jerry Springer gained national popularity in the early 1990s hosting The Jerry Springer Show, setting the standard of so-called 'Trash TV'. Springer on the Radio was produced with a higher quality level compared to The Jerry Springer Show. The program's comments and general standpoint overwhelmingly favored the Democratic Party and viewpoints considered liberal in the American political spectrum.

Springer on the Radio, along with other talk shows broadcast on the Air America Radio network, arose to counterattack the perceived radio hegemony of conservative talk show hosts such as Rush Limbaugh and Sean Hannity. Over the years, Jerry Springer had shown an interest in running for either the United States Senate or the governorship in Ohio. His decision to host a serious liberal radio show might have been due to a desire to distance himself from his TV show, which he himself considered ‘stupid’.

== Stations ==
Terrestrial

Springer on the Radio reached a height of 53 affiliates. It did not have nearly as many when the show reached its last day on air. USA Today reported that the show had "about two dozen" stations on its last day. Some of these stations are listed below.

- San Diego, CA: 1360 KLSD
- San Luis Obispo, CA: 1340 KYNS
- Santa Barbara, CA: 1340 KCLU
- Detroit, MI: 1310 WDTW (AM)
- Sarasota, FL: 1450 WSRQ
- Chicago, IL: 850 WCPT (AM)
- Portland, ME: 870 WMTW (AM)
- Ann Arbor, MI: 1290 WLBY
- New York, NY: 1600 WWRL
- Santa Fe, NM: 1260 KTRC
- Cincinnati, OH: 1360 WSAI
- Memphis, TN: 680 WWTQ
- Austin, TX: 1600 KOKE
- Corpus Christi, TX: 1150 KCCT
- El Paso, TX: 1650 KHRO
- Brattleboro, VT: 1490 WKVT
- Burlington, VT: 1070 WTWK

Satellite/Other

- XM Radio: Channel 167; Springer on the Radio was taken off XM Radio after it was moved to Air America Syndication
- Online at www.airamericaradio.com
