= KHFR =

KHFR may refer to:

- KHFR-LP, a low-power radio station (103.5 FM) licensed to serve Keosauqua, Iowa, United States
- KZTN-LD, a low-power television station (channel 20) licensed to serve Boise, Idaho, United States, which held the call sign KHFR-LD from 2013 to 2014
- KCLM, a radio station (89.7 FM) licensed to serve Santa Maria, California, United States, which held the call sign KHFR from 2002 to 2013
