= David Bender =

American activist

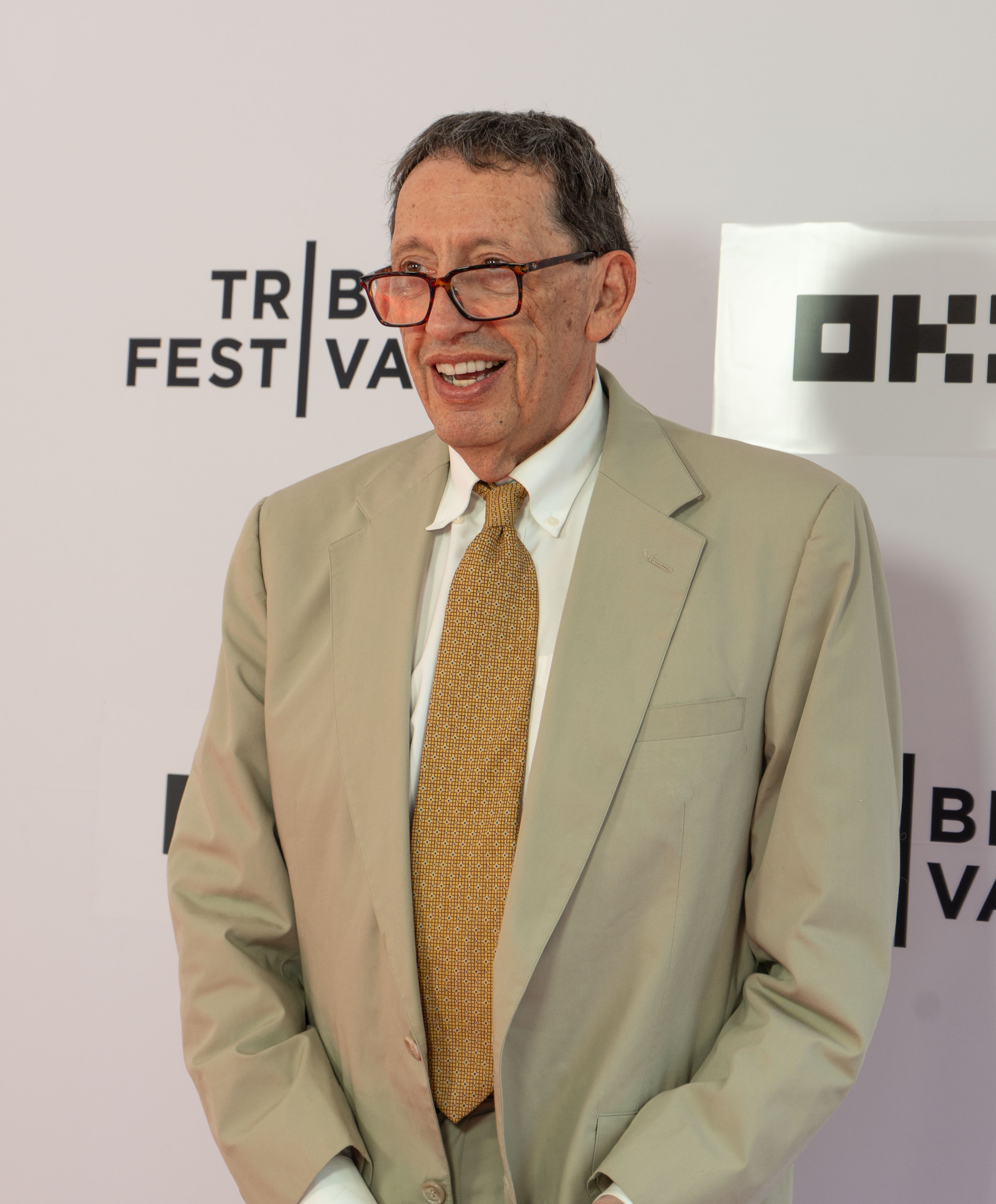
- Bender in 2026
- Born: 1955 or 1956 (age 70–71)
- Years active: 1968–present

David Bender is an American political activist, author and former host of the talk radio show Politically Direct on Air America Radio.

== Political activism ==
David Bender's five-decade career as a political activist began at the age of twelve when he took a "leave of absence" from the seventh grade to become a full-time volunteer in the presidential campaign of Senator Robert F. Kennedy.

Four years later, as a high school reporter, Mr. Bender covered the presidential campaigns of Richard Nixon, George McGovern and Hubert Humphrey. He was literally a "boy on the bus," traveling in the company of such journalistic legends as Walter Cronkite and Eric Sevareid.

Later, he became a key aide to the legendary liberal activist Allard K. Lowenstein, the former New York congressman who was a pivotal figure in both the civil rights movement and the anti-Vietnam War movement. He would go on to serve on the national field staffs of California Governor Jerry Brown’s 1976 presidential campaign and on Senator Edward M. Kennedy’s 1980 presidential campaign.

When John F. Kennedy, Jr. launched his political and cultural magazine, George, in 1995, he chose David Bender as its first West Coast contributing editor. Citing Mr. Bender's years of experience in politics, government, media and entertainment, Kennedy said, "As long as I've known David Bender, he has been involved in public issues. I think what he's been able to do, rather uniquely, is kind of meld a lot of different worlds and channel them into public issues, whether it be Washington, New York or Los Angeles – particularly within the entertainment industry. I can't really think of anyone who has done it longer or as well as he."

== Air America ==
Bender had a show called Politically Direct on Air America Radio, on which he would converse with political and media influentials such as Hillary Clinton, Barack Obama, Al Gore and Gore Vidal on progressive issues and the 2008 elections. Politically Direct briefly held a weekly time slot, after which Bender voluntarily ended the program in May 2007 to later join Air America's Ring of Fire as one of three co-hosts.

Bender joined The Rachel Maddow Show as a regular contributor and she dubbed him my political guru. In March 2008, as part of that show's expansion to three hours, Bender frequently guest-hosted the show as well.

On Sunday, June 21, 2009, he announced that Politically Direct was ending the following week. This was his own decision, as he subsequently announced that he was resuming his writing career. He left the door open for a return to broadcasting and Air America at some point in the future.

== Writing career ==
In 2000, with musician David Crosby, Mr. Bender co-authored a book and co-produced a four-hour documentary series, Stand And Be Counted, which recounts. the history of artist activism on social and political issues. It features over forty original interviews ranging from Pete Seeger and Joan Baez to Willie Nelson and Sir Elton John.

David Bender was the research editor for I Am Spartacus, actor/producer Kirk Douglas’ 2012 account of making the film that broke the Hollywood blacklist. That same year he returned to broadcasting on the Progressive Voices Network as host of the eponymous, THE DAVID BENDER SHOW.

In 2018, Mr. Bender co-authored THE DEAN, the autobiography of the nation's longest serving member of Congress, the late John D. Dingell, Jr. of Michigan.

== Film and television ==
Bender began his formal career in film and television in 1986, when he was chosen as unit publicist on Dominick & Eugene, Orion Pictures’ feature film co-starring Tom Hulce and Ray Liotta. Subsequently, he served as chief of staff and liaison to the entertainment community under Roy Furman, finance chairman of the Democratic National Committee during President Clinton’s first term.

Bender conceived and produced an original, live-streamed theatrical reading of excerpts from the Mueller Report. The Investigation: A Search for the Truth in Ten Acts was a one-night-only reading of a play adapted directly from the Mueller Report by Pulitzer Prize-winning playwright Robert Schenkkan. Staged in New York City’s historic Riverside Church on June 24, 2019 before an invitation-only audience, The Investigation: A Search for the Truth in Ten Acts starred Annette Bening, John Lithgow, Kevin Kline, Joel Grey, Michael Shannon, Alfre Woodard and Zachary Quinto. It was streamed by 3.7 million viewers in eight weeks.

In 2009 Bender conceived what would ultimately become Visible: Out on Television, a five-part documentary series chronicling the history and impact of LGBTQ images originating on American television. Among the more than ninety interviews conducted for this groundbreaking series, twenty-eight were conducted by David Bender, including Rachel Maddow, Michael Douglas, Neil Patrick Harris, Billy Crystal, Billie Jean King, Laverne Cox, Chris Colfer, Sean Hayes and Lena Dunham. Visible: Out on Television debuted on Apple+ on February 14, 2020.
