= List of Air America Radio affiliates =

This is a list of stations that were affiliated with Air America Radio at the time of its shutdown in January 2010.

== Affiliate list ==
=== Conventional radio ===
Eastern Time Zone
Location	U.S. Market Share Rank of City (Not station or programming)	Identifier	Station	Notes
New York City, New York	1	WWRL	1600 AM	Carried Ron Reagan, Rachel Maddow, and Richard Greene from Air America; produced its own morning show and local interest programming on weekend afternoons, as well as Alan Colmes, Al Sharpton, and Ed Schultz. Now an affiliate of Black Information Network.
Asheville, North Carolina	161	WPEK	880 AM	Owned by iHeartMedia; Carried AAR programming airing in daytime. Now ESPN
Augusta, Georgia	102	WAAW	94.7 FM	Now an Urban Gospel station.
Bangor, Maine		WZON-FM	103.1 FM	Carried Montel Across America and Ron Reagan Jr. Now an AAA-formatted station.
Bennington, Vermont		WBTN	1370 AM	Carried only the Thom Hartman Show. Now a variety-formatted station.
Brattleboro, Vermont	-	WKVT	1490 AM	Carried the majority of AAR programming. Now a Country station.
Chapel Hill, North Carolina	43	WCHL	1360 AM	Carried the majority of AAR programming. Now a News/Talk station.
Charlottesville, Virginia	231	WVAX	1450 AM	Carried the majority of AAR programming. Now a sports station affiliated with ESPN Radio.
Columbia, South Carolina	90	WOIC	1230 AM	Carried the majority of AAR programming, but frequently preempted them for sports. Became a full-time sports station upon Air America's bankruptcy. Now AAA
Daytona, Florida	78	WPUL	1590 AM	Owned by Andala Enterprises, Inc. Carries Lionel. Now talk/gospel
Destin/Ft. Walton Beach, Florida	?	WNWF	1120 AM	Owned by Andala Enterprises, Inc. Carries Thom Hartmann. Now adult standards
Detroit, Michigan	9	WDTW	1310 AM	Owned by Clear Channel Communications. Carried the majority of AAR programming. Later sold to Pedro Zamora and is now Spanish.
Grand Rapids, Michigan	67	WTKG	1230 AM	Owned by iHeartMedia. Carried the majority of AAR programming, but also carried conservative Glenn Beck. Continues with progressive talk.
Huntington, West Virginia	156	WCMI	1340 AM	Carried a majority AAR programming with sports on the weekends. Station moved from WRVC in November 2006. WRVC switched to all-sports programming. WCMI is also now all-sports, as an affiliate of ESPN Radio.
Ithaca, New York	281	WNYY	1470 AM	Carried the majority of AAR programming. Now airs an Oldies format.
Jacksonville, Florida	47(?)	WJSJ	105.3 FM	Owned by Tama Radio Licenses of Jacksonville, Fl, Inc. Now simulcasts WKBX out of Kingsland, GA, as WYKB.
Springfield, Massachusetts	82	WHMP	1240 AM/1400 AM/1600 AM	Carried the majority of AAR programming. Now a news/talk station.
State College, Pennsylvania	82	WBLF	970 AM	Carried only the Thom Hartmann Show. Now a news/talk station.
Tampa Bay, Florida	18	WTAN	1340 AM	Carried only Lionel until June 21, 2009. Broadcasts a mix of talk audio and adult standards.
Washington, D.C.	8	WZAA	1050 AM	Leased by Air America from June 17, 2009, until bankruptcy and carried most of the AAR lineup. Now a Regional Mexican-formatted station.
Central Time Zone
Location	Rank	Identifier	Station	Notes
Chicago, Illinois	3	WCPT	820 AM, 92.5 FM, 92.7 FM, 99.9 FM	Carried the Ron Reagan Show and Clout on weekdays and some AAM programming on weekends. Webstream carried AAM programming overnight. The 820 AM and 92.5 FM frequencies continue with progressive talk, while 92.7 FM and 99.9 FM broadcast a Polish-language ethnic format. The FM frequencies broadcast a Dance Hits format (as "Dance Factory") at night.
Minneapolis, Minnesota	16	KTNF	950 AM	Carried the majority of AAR programming. Continues with progressive talk.
Madison, Wisconsin	96	WXXM	92.1 FM	First FM affiliate, Owned by iHeartMedia. Was planning on switching to all-sports in January 2007, but eventually backed out after listener backlash. Now adult hits
Marion, Illinois	235	WINI	1420 AM	Carried only the Thom Hartmann Show. Now an Oldies station.
Mountain Time Zone
Location	Rank	Identifier	Station	Notes
Albuquerque, New Mexico	70	KABQ	1350 AM	Owned by iHeartMedia. Carried the majority of AAR programming. Now All-Podcast.
Denver, Colorado	22	KKZN	760 AM	Owned by iHeartMedia. Carried the majority of AAR programming. Now a news/talk station.
Santa Fe, New Mexico	236	KTRC	1260 AM	Carried the majority of AAR programming. Continues with progressive talk.
Sheridan, Wyoming	-	KYTI	HD 93.7-3 FM	Only available on HD radio. KYTI ceased broadcasting the HD3 signal with Air America's bankruptcy.
Taos, New Mexico	-	KVOT	1340 AM	Carried the majority of AAR programming. Continues with progressive talk.
Pacific Time Zone
Location	Rank	Identifier	Station	Notes
Astoria, Oregon	-	KVAS	1230 AM	Carried only Thom Hartmann. Now a classic hits-formatted station.
Eureka, California	-	KGOE	1480 AM	Carried only Thom Hartmann. Now an oldies-formatted station.
Los Angeles, California	2	KTLK	1150 AM	Owned by iHeartMedia. Carried the majority of AAR programming. Now a conservative talk-formatted station.
Monterey-Salinas-Santa Cruz, California	80	KRXA	540 AM	Carried some weekend programming from AAR. Now a religious station broadcasting in Spanish.
North Bend, Oregon	-	KBBR	1340 AM	Carried the majority of AAR programming. Continues with progressive talk.
Palm Springs, California	137	KPTR	1340 AM	Carried the majority of AAR programming. Now Adult Standards
Portland, Oregon	24	KPOJ	620 AM	One of the first Clear Channel (now iHeartMedia)-owned affiliates. Carried the majority of AAR programming. Now a sports talk-formatted station.
Reno, Nevada	124	KJFK	1230 AM	Carried the majority of AAR programming. Now a Variety Hits-formatted station.
San Francisco, California	4	KKGN	960 AM	Owned by iHeartMedia. Carried the majority of AAR programming. Now a business talk-formatted station, affiliated with Bloomberg Radio.
San Luis Obispo, California	173	KYNS	1340 AM	Carried the majority of AAR programming. Now an Alternative rock -formatted station.
Santa Barbara, California	207	KIST	1340 AM	Owned by Clear Channel and carried Thom Hartmann. Later sold to California Lutheran University and is now a public radio station affiliated with NPR.
Seattle, Washington	14	KPTK	1090 AM	The Ron Reagan Show was broadcast from the station. Later a sports-formatted station affiliated with CBS Sports Radio; now a conservative talk station.
Spokane, Washington	92	KPTQ	1280 AM	Owned by iHeartMedia. Carried the majority of AAR programming. Now a Classic Hip Hop
Victor Valley, California	126	KSZL	1230 AM	Carried the majority of AAR programming. Now a news/talk-formatted station.
Alaska/Hawaii Time Zones
Location	Rank	Identifier	Station	Notes
Anchorage, Alaska	171	KUDO	1080 AM	Carried the majority of AAR programming. Now a talk-formatted station.

=== Former affiliates ===
Location	Rank	Identifier	Station	Notes
Akron, Ohio	73	WJMP	1520 AM	Dropped AAR for sports in June 2005. AAR moved to WARF in July 2005. Now Defunct
Akron, Ohio	73	WARF	1350 AM	Owned by Clear Channel; Switched to All Sports March 30, 2007, In which is still being used as of 2020
Albany, Oregon	-	KTHH	990 AM	Switched to country. Now comedy radio
Ann Arbor, Michigan	147	WLBY	1290 AM	Owned by Clear Channel; No longer carries any Air America programming. Changed to a "business talk" format in March 2009. Now News/Talk
Atlanta, Georgia	10	WMLB	1690 AM	Air America's Atlanta area affiliate dropped all but Al Franken's show on June 11, 2006, after the station was sold to JW Broadcasting. AAR programming ended when Franken ended his show in Feb. 2007. Now Defunct
Atlantic City, New Jersey	141	WTAA	1490 AM	Switched to Mexican regional format in October 2008. Now Sports Talk
Austin, Texas	42	KOKE	1600 AM	Station was sold to Encino Broadcasting LLC. It began broadcasting Tejano music as of October 17, 2007 and still airing as of 2020.
Baton Rouge, Louisiana	77	WPYR	1380 AM	Switched to Hallelujah Gospel music in late 2007 and still airing as of 2020.
Binghamton, New York	179	WYOS	1360 AM	The Nov. 13, 2006 edition of North East Radio Watch reports that WYOS has switched from Air America to ESPN sports. Now CBS sports radio
Boston, Massachusetts	11	WKOX & WXKS	1200 AM & 1430 AM	Owned by Clear Channel; flipped to Radio Rumba on December 20, 2006 1200 AM, now WXKS, planned to switch to conservative talk on March 8, 2010, according to Clear Channel. WKOX & WXKS has now switched call letters with News/Talk and Spanish formats respectively now separately
Brainerd, Minnesota	-	WWWI	1270 AM	Carried only the Al Franken Show.
Buffalo, New York	52	WHLD	1270 AM	Carried a majority AAR programming. Dropped the format in December 2006. Now CBS Sports Radio
Buffalo, New York	52	WWKB	1520 AM	Carries only the Randi Rhodes Show and Lionel. Dropped in April 2008 after Rhodes moved to Nova M. Now ESPN Radio
Burlington, Vermont/Plattsburgh, New York	136	WTWK 1070		Moved from the stronger 24-hour signal of WVAA 1390 to the daytime-only signal of WTWK in August 2006. Carries a majority AAR programming. Replaced by EVE 1070 women talk radio on Monday, March 3., 2007. Now Classic rap
Charleston, South Carolina		WLTQ	730 AM	Flipped to standards in September 2005 as "WLTQ - The Music Of Your Life" Now Christian
Chattanooga, TN	106	WDOD	1310 AM	After 11 months, WDOD dropped AAR in favor of hits of the 1950s to 1970s in August 2006. Now Defunct
Chicago, Illinois	3	WNTD	950 AM	Station owners dropped AAR in April 2004 after a payment dispute. Now Christian
Cincinnati, Ohio	28	WSAI	1360 AM	Owned by Clear Channel; Moved to 1360 WSAI from 1530 WCKY. WSAI dropped format in December 2006. Now Christian
Cleveland, Ohio		WTAM	1100 AM	Dropped the Jerry Springer Show, its only AAR programming, in March 2006.
Columbus, Ohio	38	WTPG	1230 AM	Owned by Clear Channel. Carried a majority AAR programming. Switched to mostly conservative talk programming on January 7, 2007. Programs include Bill O'Reilly, Michael Savage, Quinn & Rose, Laura Ingraham, Jim Rome, Gary Sullivan, and Dave Ramsey. Now classic hip hop
Corpus Christi, Texas	139	KCCT	1150 AM	No longer airing any AAR programming. Now classic hits
Dallas, Texas		KXEB	910 AM	Station sold. Dropped Air America on Oct. 1, 2006 for Catholic-oriented format, Which is Still being used as of 2020
Davenport, Iowa	143	WKBF	1270 AM	Programming terminated effective December 5, 2006. Switched to Christian programming following sale of station.
Duluth, Minnesota	204	KQDS	1490 AM	Switched to Oldies in Feb. 2007 Now sports
El Paso, Texas	76	KHRO	1650 AM	Switched to oldies in April 2007. Now classic hits
Ely, Minnesota		WELY	1450 AM	Now Variety
Eugene, Oregon	150	KOPT	1600 AM	Carried a majority AAR programming. Flipped to OPB Radio and changed calls to KOPB on February 20, 2008. Still a member of OPB radio as of 2020
Fresno, California	66	KFPT	790 AM	Carried a majority AAR programming. Dropped AAR in April 2007. Now sports radio
Honolulu, Hawaii	63	KHKA		Carries a majority AAR programming. Now CBS Sports Radio
Iowa City, Iowa		KXIC	800 AM	Carried only Thom Hartmann and Randi Rhodes, both no longer on schedule as of Feb. 2007.
Key West, Florida	291	WKIZ	1500 AM	Once carried AAR programming. Now a Defunct.
Kihei, Hawaii		KAOI	1110 AM	Island of Maui. Carried only one hour of Al Franken, dropped as of Feb. 2007.
Lafayette, Louisiana	103	KEUN	1490 AM	Switched to primarily conservative talk around August 2007. Now News/Talk/Information
Lake Tahoe, Nevada		KTHO	590 AM	Station dropped AAR and returned to local programming in August 2005. Now Classic Hits
Little Rock, Arkansas	85	KDXE	1380 AM	Carried a majority AAR programming and was leased by Nova M Radio. Switched to ESPN radio in March 2007 after lease ended. Now Gospel
Lihue, Hawaii		KQNG	570 AM	Island of Kauai. Only carried The Al Franken Show. Now country
Medford-Ashland, Oregon	210	KEZX	730 AM	Carried only Thom Hartmann. Flipped to Fox Sports Radio on February 4, 2008. Still with fox sports radio as of 2020
Memphis, Tennessee	49	WSMB	680 AM	Switched to Fox Sports Sept 1st, 2007 per Radio Online. WSMB call sign moved from New Orleans to Memphis (formerly WWTQ) following Hurricane Katrina, which is why WSMB appears twice in this list. This Memphis station is now ESPN radio
Miami, Florida	12	WINZ	940 AM	Owned by Clear Channel. Converted to sports talk in April 2009. The reason stated on the WINZ website was that the progressive talk format was causing the station to lose money and that sports talk is more profitable. Former host Nicole Sandler pointed out that the station had a weak signal at night and made no marketing effort. Still using sports talk as of 2020
Missoula, Montana		KKNS	105.9 FM	Switched to Jack FM in March 2006. Now KFGM with a variety format
Montpelier/Barre/St. Johnsbury, Vermont		WDEV	550 AM/96.1 FM	Has no AAR programming on schedule. Now Variety
New Haven, Connecticut	107	WAVZ	1300 AM	Owned by Clear Channel. Carried a majority AAR programming. Flipped to ESPN radio in Feb. 2007. Still with ESPN radio in 2020
New Orleans, Louisiana	47	WSMB	1350 AM	Dropped AAR in November 2006. Now WWWL with classic R&B
New York City, New York	1	WLIB	1190 AM	First flagship station. Owners (Inner City Broadcasting Corporation) dropped AAR on Sept. 1, 2006 and switched to gospel. AAR moved to WWRL Still using gospel as of 2020
Petoskey, Michigan	192	WWKK	750 AM	Station sold. AAR programming moved to sister stations WJML and WLDR.
Petoskey, Michigan	192	WJML	1110 AM	Carries Ed Schultz and Alan Colmes - which are not A/A. Simulcasts with WLDR Traverse City.
Philadelphia, Pennsylvania	6	WHAT	1340 AM	Only carried Al Franken and Randi Rhodes. Station dropped both shows in September 2005. Now Spanish
Phoenix, Arizona	15	KPHX	1480 AM	Station dropped AAR and switched to an Adult standards music format in January, 2009. Progressive talk format continued on KNUV until March 5, 2009. Now Spanish Christian
Phoenix, Arizona	15	KXXT	1010 AM	Station dropped AAR in early 2006 after being sold. AAR eventually moved to KPHX. Now Christian
Pittsburgh, Pennsylvania	23	WURP	1550 AM	Carried the Young Turks morning show Mon. - Fri. and AAR on Saturday afternoons. Dropped AAR programming on April 15, 2007, for business radio following station sale. Now jazz
Pittsburgh, Pennsylvania	23	WPTT	1360 AM	Carried conservative shows along with Thom Hartmann and Alan Colmes. Now Gospel WGBN
Portland, Maine	167	WLVP	870 AM	Station dropped AAR on June 1, 2007, for ESPN Radio. Now oldies
Providence, Rhode Island		WHJJ	920 AM	Carried only Franken and Rhodes. Station dropped AAR in September 2005.
Rochester, New York	54	WROC	950 AM	Dropped AAR Sept 2 2008 for an ESPN Radio. Still with ESPN radio as of 2020
Sacramento, California	27	KCVV	1240 AM	Carries This Is America with Jon Elliott and majority of AAR weekend programing. Dropped AAR for a gospel format.
Sacramento, California	26	KCTC	1320 AM	Owned by Entercom.Moved to KCTC from KSAC. Carried a majority AAR programming. Dropped AAR for ESPN Radio in February 2007.
San Antonio, Texas		KRPT	92.5 FM	Switched to country music.
San Antonio, Texas	30	KHHL	103.1 FM	Fringe signal in San Antonio. Carries a majority AAR programming. Switched to Spanish language programming in December 2006
San Bernardino, California	27	KCAA	1050 AM	Carried one hour each of Franken and Rhodes. Dropped affiliation effective April 2007.
San Diego, California	17	KLSD	1360 AM	Owned by Clear Channel. Switched to sports on Nov. 12, 2007. This left San Diego with 5 conservative AM talk stations (AM540, KOGO, KFMB, KCBQ, and AM1700) and 3 sports talk stations airing in the market.
Sarasota, Florida	74	WSRQ	1450 AM	Owned by Clear Channel. Used to air the Jerry Springer Show.
Santa Cruz, California		KOMY	1340 AM	Dropped AAR in January '07 for oldies music.
St. Louis, Missouri	20	KQQZ	1190 AM	Fringe signal in St. Louis. Only carried Rhodes' shows.
Tucson, Arizona	61	KJLL	1330 AM	Carried only the Randi Rhodes Show.
Traverse City, Michigan	192	WLDR	1210 AM	Simulcasts with WJML Petoskey - Ed Schultz and Alan Colmes, but no A/A programs.
Washington, D.C.	8	WWRC	1260 AM	Owned by Clear Channel. Changed to financial advice programming February 2009.
Warren, Ohio		WANR	1570 AM	Changed formats to Christian programming following an ownership dispute in April 2005 A few weeks later, the group seeking to switch the station's format was able to purchase the station, and the Air America programming was discontinued permanently.
West Palm Beach, Florida	46	WJNO	1290 AM	Owned by Clear Channel Carried only the Randi Rhodes Show.
