= The Mark Riley Show =

Weekday radio show with Mark Riley

The Mark Riley Show was a weekday radio show on the Air America Radio network hosted by long-time talk radio host Mark Riley.

== Background ==
Originally it was part of a larger Air America Mornings program, but as of September 18, 2006 the show was billed on its own. The show featured news items read by Riley and his commentary on each of them. Riley interviewed a wide variety of guests, though these segments are often pre-recorded due to the early airtime of the show. Riley often took listener calls on a specific topic in a rapid-fire fashion.

The show began on January 2, 2006, originally airing weekdays from 5 am to 7 am Eastern Time. It subsequently aired on weekdays from 5AM - 6AM ET on some Air America affiliates.

The show came to an end on May 11, 2007.

== Regular features ==
- Sunrise Soundbites - audio clips from some of yesterdays important news stories
- Last Night's Clips - audio clips from the late-night television comedy shows
- Overseas Live - Riley talks with an overseas reporter on the day's major international story
- On the Grapevine - entertainment news
- Nice Try of the Week - a political figure's failed attempt to justify their actions
- Weekly Conversation with Robert Reich - Riley and Reich discuss the week's economic news
- Winners and Losers - Friday roundup
- Wayne Gillman - the morning AAR newscaster joins the show during the second hour
- Common Sense Commentary - Jim Hightower's daily commentary
- The Numbers - A list of numerical facts similar to Harper's Index

== Music ==
- Theme: "Float On" by Modest Mouse
- Bumpers: various jazz tunes

== Staff ==
- Host: Mark Riley
- Producer: Ron Dodd
- Producer: John Crimmings
- Sports reporter: Larry Hardesty
- Sound Engineer: Kris Lo Presto
