= EcoTalk =

Environmental radio show

EcoTalk, formerly TrashTalk, was a radio show on the Air America Radio network, hosted by Betsy Rosenberg. Rosenberg is a long-time radio journalist, she spent much of her career with CBS Radio, specifically the "environmental issues" reporter for CBS's San Francisco station KCBS-AM.

The show launched on Earth Day 1997 on KCBS radio. The focus was originally on waste reduction, hence the original name TrashTalk: Sound Solutions for a Healthier Planet and People. In 2004, it expanded to an hour-long interview show and rebranded as EcoTalk. Around this time it also moved to Air America, broadcasting on 40 stations across the United States, making it the first nationally-syndicated radio show about environmentalism.

In May 2007, owing to the restructuring of Air America and a lack of funding, EcoTalk had its final episode.
