= WKIZ =

Radio station in Key West, Florida (1959–2018)

- Key West, Florida; United States
- Broadcast area: Lower Florida Keys
- Frequency: 1500 kHz
- Branding: KONK 1500AM, Community Radio for Key West

Programming
- Format: Talk radio

Ownership
- Owner: Daniel Caamano; (Almavision of Miami)
- Operator: KONK Communications

History
- First air date: March 27, 1959
- Last air date: October 22, 2018
- Call sign meaning: "Keys"

Technical information
- Facility ID: 11193
- Class: B
- Power: 250 watts unlimited
- Transmitter coordinates: 24°34′3.5″N 81°44′53.3″W

WKIZ (1500 AM) was a radio station broadcasting a talk radio format. Licensed to Key West, Florida, United States, the station was last owned by Daniel Caamano, through licensee Almavision of Miami, brokered to KONK Communications.

== History ==
WKIZ began broadcasting on March 27, 1959. It was owned by the Florida Keys Broadcasting Corporation.

In the early 1990s, the station aired an oldies format. It was taken off the air December 6, 1994, but resumed broadcasting in early 1997, as an affiliate of Bloomberg Radio. It adopted a Spanish language religious format later in the year. In the 2000s, the station aired a progressive talk format as an affiliate of Air America.

In 2010, Overseas Radio, LLC began brokering broadcasting time on WKIZ. The station was branded KONK and aired a talk radio format. The radio station was called "The Best Talk Radio Station in Florida" by Florida Monthly magazine (September 2010). KONK originally signed on May 26, 2009, as an unlicensed station operating under U.S. Federal Communications Commission (FCC) Part 15 low power rules, broadcasting on 1630 kHz at 1 milliwatt, covering only the island of Key West.

The station was taken off the air on September 10, 2017, due to damage to its transmitter, caused by Hurricane Irma. It resumed operations in September 2018, running reduced power of 62.5 watts, but was again taken silent on October 22, 2018. The WKIZ license expired on February 1, 2020, as its owner failed to file an application to renew the station's license.
