= Evan Montvel Cohen =

Guam businessman (born 1966)

- Born: 1966 (age 59–60)
- Education: Beloit College
- Occupation: Business executive

Evan Montvel Cohen (born 1966) is an American businessman living on the island of Guam. He was a founder and the first chairman of the liberal Air America Radio. Cohen has worked primarily in the broadcasting industry and in politics.

== Early life ==
Montvel Cohen attended Beloit College in Wisconsin, during the 1980s. Prior to Air America, Cohen was a major shareholder of Latte Publishing, a Guam-based publishing company, was a vice president at Sorensen Pacific Broadcasting, and a market research specialist in Guam. He also owned The Communications Corp and many other businesses. Montvel Cohen also invested in several Asian ad agencies and media businesses in the mid and late 1990s. Cohen also participated in political campaigns as a consultant and chairman of a political action committee.

== Air America ==
In 2003, Cohen was working as Director of Development for the Gloria Wise Boys and Girls Clubs when he and business partner Rex Sorensen, CEO of Sorensen Media Group, created Progress Media Inc. On March 31, 2004, Air America was launched with much fanfare on flagship WLIB in New York City. Soon afterward it was discovered that Cohen had secured part of the money used to found the network by a loan from his employer, the non-profit Gloria Wise Boys and Girls Clubs. Approved by the board of directors and in the amount of $480,000, it went to Cohen's company Progress Media, then owner of Air America Radio. The Gloria Wise group was a non-profit organization, partially funded by the city of New York, which provided services for children and seniors in the Bronx. The city suspended further funding of the agency, and Boys and Girls Clubs of America revoked the group's right to use their name, likeness or logo. When the funds were transferred Evan Montvel Cohen was still Director of Development for Gloria Wise. This was part of a larger misappropriation of funds by the organization's executives, which saw several of them receiving money from the organization that was in turn used for personal expenditures. By the time this was revealed, Progress Media Inc. had sold its Air America rights to Piquant LLC (in November 2004), who subsequently agreed to repay Gloria Wise $875,000 worth of the debt, as a condition of the sale.

== Lotus Media Services ==
Cohen is the managing director for Sorensen Media Group and Chairman of Lotus Media Services. Lotus Media Services is a creative content development and production house providing radio and television content for the Pacific Rim and the U.S.. In 2007 Montvel-Cohen began focusing mainly on TV and web video content development, Cohen developed the TV programs “GU MD”, “The Buzz”, and “TimeOut” and more than 15 other programs and hundreds of online video segments.

Montvel Cohen and Sorensen have partnered with MTV Philippines and ABS-CBN Corporation - the largest entertainment and media conglomerate in the Philippines to create television programming for Guam and other media markets.

== 2008 arrest ==
Cohen was arrested in Guam on May 26, 2008 after being indicted by a grand jury in Hawaii for theft, fraudulent use of a credit card, forgery, and money laundering. He was extradited from Guam to Hawaii and subsequently released on bail. In 2009, Cohen pleaded no contest (guilty) to one count and the other charges were dropped. In his plea agreement, he was sentenced to five years probation and continued to run his company.

Montvel-Cohen is currently splitting his time between Guam and Brooklyn, New York.
