= KSYV =

- Solvang, California; United States
- Broadcast area: Santa Maria—Lompoc, California
- Frequency: 96.7 MHz
- Branding: KCLU Santa Ynez Valley

Programming
- Format: Public Radio

Ownership
- Owner: California Lutheran University
- Sister stations: KCLM, KCLU, KCLU-FM

History
- First air date: September 20, 1982
- Call sign meaning: Santa Ynez Valley

Technical information
- Licensing authority: FCC
- Facility ID: 51185
- Class: A
- ERP: 420 watts
- HAAT: 371 meters (1,217 ft)
- Transmitter coordinates: 34°41′27.9″N 120°16′1.5″W

Links
- Public license information: Public file; LMS
- Website: kclu.org

KSYV (96.7 FM) is a non-commercial radio station licensed to Solvang, California, United States, and broadcasts to the Santa Maria-Lompoc, California area. The station is owned by California Lutheran University and airs a public radio format. KSYV features programming from NPR.

== History ==
KSYV first signed on September 20, 1982 with a middle of the road music format. In 2001, original owner Pacific Coast Broadcasting Company sold KSYV to Knight Broadcasting Inc. for $655,000. At the time of the sale, the station broadcast an adult contemporary music format.
