= The Time Is Now (radio program) =

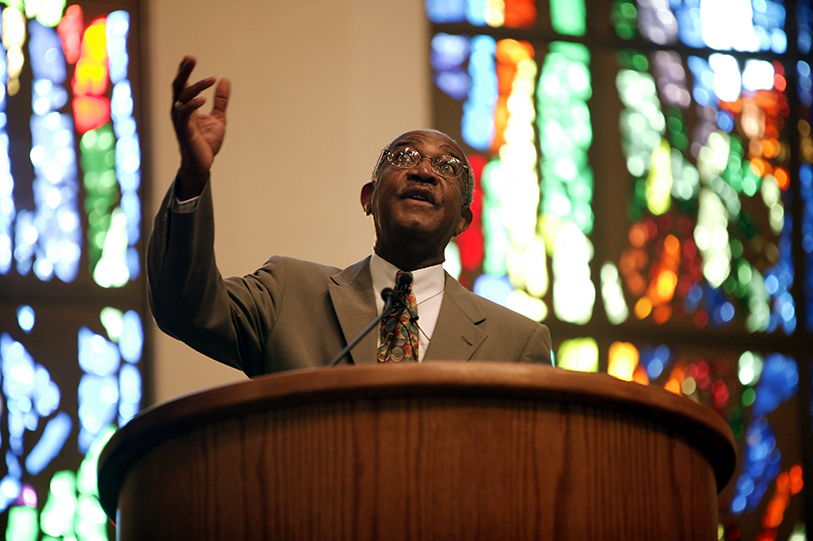
James Alexander Forbes

The Time Is Now was a one-hour syndicated radio program in the United States, which aired on Air America Radio. The show was hosted by James Forbes and aired 7-8 p.m. on Saturday. The last show episode was broadcast on July 28, 2007.
