= Corio (surname) =

Corio is a surname of Italian origin. People with that name include:

- Ann Corio (1909–1999), American burlesque performer and actress
- Bernardino Corio (1459–1519), Italian humanist and historian of the Renaissance
- Frankie Corio (born 2010), Scottish actress
- Girolamo Corio (died 1651), Italian Catholic prelate and bishop
- Silvio Corio (1875−1954), Italian anarchist

== See also ==
- Corio (disambiguation)
- Coiro
