= The Rachel Maddow Show (radio program) =

Weekday radio show

- Home station: WWRL
- Syndicates: Air America Radio
- TV adaptations: The Rachel Maddow Show
- Starring: Rachel Maddow
- Produced by: Vanessa Silverton-Peel; Andrew Dunn
- Original release: April 14, 2005 – January 21, 2010
- Website: www.rachelmaddow.com
- Podcast

The Rachel Maddow Show was a weekday radio show on the Air America Radio network hosted by Rachel Maddow. The show featured news items read by Maddow and her commentary on each of them as well as interview segments with politicians, newsmakers and pundits. Guests included presidential candidate John Edwards, author Eric Alterman, reporters from The Nation magazine and commentators from The Center for American Progress. Beginning September 8, 2008, she also debuted a TV version of the show on MS NOW of the same name with different content. Early in 2009 the show was moved to the 5AM timeslot and consisted almost entirely of the audio from the previous nights MS NOW broadcast of Maddow's television show. On January 21, 2010, Air America Radio ceased programming citing economic difficulties.

== History ==
The show began on April 14, 2005, and moved to 7AM–9AM EST on January 2, 2006. It later aired weekdays from 6PM–8PM EST on some Air America affiliates. Unlike most Air America programs, listener calls were not usually taken, in keeping with the show's more hard-news orientation and its format. The only exception to the rule was when either a guest or an issue's stance was important enough to warrant the calls (e.g., Maddow took calls from caucus voters in Iowa and primary voters in New Hampshire prior to those states' presidential nominating contests in early January 2008).

Until December 14, 2007, humorist Kent Jones served as The Rachel Maddow Show's co-host, contributing odd news stories as well as having his own segment, Kent Jones Now!, which aired at the end of each hour and focused on another odd news story. Jones also read the previous night's sports news during the second hour, substituting odd phrases for the word "beat" or "defeated" in the result depending on the city of the team that won — e.g. "the San Francisco Giants Violent Femmes'd the Los Angeles Dodgers, 5-2." Jones typically ended his segments by saying "Vigilance!" forcefully, although sometimes he'd say "Sacajawea" in the same tone. He announced his departure at the end of the Tuesday, show of December 11, saying it was a "business decision" at the network. Jones later joined Maddow on the television version of The Rachel Maddow Show.

From March 10, 2008, until the debut of her television show, Maddow was a panelist on Race for the White House on MS NOW, simulcast as the first hour of the radio show, which expanded to three hours. Bender came on as co-host of the third hour and solo host for that hour when Maddow's television obligations on MS NOW conflicted with her ability to host the show.

With the debut of Maddow's nightly MS NOW program on September 8, 2008, the radio show returned to a two-hour format. The second hour was usually a rebroadcast of the previous night's television episode.

Early in 2009 The Rachel Maddow Show was moved to a one-hour timeslot at 5AM Eastern Time. It began with a short introduction from Maddow followed by the audio from the previous night's MS NOW broadcast of The Rachel Maddow Show. Little explanation or warning was given for this shift except for Maddow's comments that doing two shows was far too taxing.

== Regular features ==
- Top Headlines — The top of the show (as well as the top of the second hour) started with Maddow delivering "News from Iraq and life during wartime". The only exceptions to this start were breaking news, a special high-profile guest or when the show completely breaks format in order to tackle an urgent news story for the duration of the show. After the Iraq news, Maddow continued to report on other top stories of the day.
- Ask Doctor Maddow — This segment, which usually aired at the end of the first hour, consisted of Maddow, answering a question from a listener who either sent it through email or phoned it in on the "Ask Dr. Maddow" hotline. While she holds a D.Phil, Maddow is not a medical doctor, thus the tongue-in-cheek disclaimer ("Rachel Maddow is a doctor...just not that kind of doctor"). The questions covered random topics, from the origins of a word to natural science mysteries.

Before his departure, Kent Jones would introduce the segment by saying that Maddow was "the world's leading expert on...", then usually add something in based on what was discussed in the prior segment. After Jones left the segment was co-hosted by show producer Vanessa Silverton-Peel, who encouraged viewers to send questions that they were "just too lazy to Google" themselves.

One of the questions each week was selected randomly during the Friday segment, and Maddow rewarded the listener with a prize package that always consisted of a glossy autographed photo of Kent Jones (still given away despite his leaving the show) and something from her desk (usually a book written by a previous day's guest and anything else she could find that is worthy of giving away).

- Burying the lede — Maddow reported on a story that she believed should have received more attention than it did. This segment always followed Ask Doctor Maddow, and sometimes aired later in the show if there were multiple stories being "buried".
- Rachel's Front Page — Maddow critiqued how mainstream media outlets were reporting a major news item.
- Underbelly — Maddow explored right-wing political tactics and the possible motives behind them (described as "poking a sharp stick into the soft white underbelly of the rrrrright wing scheme machine", always with a trilled "r"). Previously a daily segment, Underbelly didn't appear as often in the rotation (hence Maddow's inclination to add "Every day...or so" to her introduction of the segment).
- Pet Story — Typically the final segment of the show. Both Maddow and Jones delighted in this segment and took to introducing it with a monkey chirping sound effect, followed by the two of them yelling "MONKEY!". After Jones' departure, Maddow didn't typically introduce the segment with the same fervor because "it makes (her) feel sad," although she has occasionally yelled "monkey" after the sound effect. The story could (and usually did) revolve around anything, but animals were involved more often than not. In more recent times, the Pet Story did not air at all, with Maddow instead using the final minutes of the show to plug whatever she was doing on television later that night (usually an appearance on Countdown with Keith Olbermann or Verdict with Dan Abrams on MS NOW), as well as using the remaining time as filler material.

== Sound effects ==
While the show covered plenty of serious political topics, some levity was injected via the use of snippets of dialogue, music and sound effects. They included dialogue from Homer Simpson and the movie Little Miss Sunshine. The opening theme music was "Stealing the Stock" from the Ocean's Twelve soundtrack, as revealed on August 23, 2007's "Ask Dr. Maddow" segment. In addition, nearly every Friday show opened with a piece of dialogue from Friday ("'Cuz it's Friday, you ain't got no job, and you ain't got *bleep* to do!"). The second hour of the Friday show typically opened with a recording of Maddow's mother trying poorly to imitate the Friday dialogue obtained when sound mixer Kris LoPresto, who was given Maddow's voice mail inbox password, recorded it directly from her cell phone.

== Staff ==
- Host: Rachel Maddow
- Producer: Vanessa Silverton-Peel
- Audio Producer: Andrew Dunn
- Former co-host/sports reporter/humorist: Kent Jones
- Former Producer: Nazanin Rafsanjani
- Former Producer: Jackie Bell
- Former Sound Engineer: Kris LoPresto

== See also ==
- Air America Mornings
- America Left XM channel 167
