= Air America – Gloria Wise loan controversy =

The Air America – Gloria Wise loan controversy concerned a loan from the Gloria Wise Boys and Girls Clubs, a non-profit organization serving the community of the Bronx, given to radio station Air America. The legality of the loan was investigated for several reasons, including the Boys and Girls Club being a charity organization and a conflict of interest as Evan Cohen was at the time chairman of both entities.

== Background ==
In July 2005, the Bronx News reported Gloria Wise Boys and Girls Clubs of Co-op City loaned $480,000 to Progress Media, then owner of Air America Radio. The Gloria Wise group claims to be a non-profit organization providing services for children and seniors in the Bronx. The amount was later determined to actually be $875,000. On August 2, 2005, The New York Sun reported that the Gloria Wise executive committee estimated a total of $875,000 was transferred from the club to Progress Media as well as directly to Evan Cohen.

== Investigation ==
As the organization received substantial funding from the City of New York at that time, the legality of the transfer went under criminal investigation by NY State Attorney General Eliot Spitzer. The city suspended further funding of the agency, and Boys and Girls Clubs of America revoked the group's right to use their name, likeness or logo. At the time the funds were alleged to have been transferred, Evan Montvel Cohen, former chairman of the now-defunct Progress Media, was also Director of Development for Gloria Wise.

On August 6, 2005, the New York Post reported that the office of the New York Attorney General was joining the New York City Department of Investigation in the inquiry into the behavior of the Gloria Wise executive board. They also reported that Piquant LLC had begun paying back the funds, starting with a $50,000 payment, into an escrow account controlled by Piquant's lawyers, although city investigators had preferred a neutral account that could not be touched by either party.

On August 18, 2005, The New York Sun reported that in May 2005, Multicultural Radio Broadcasting filed suit against the owners of Air America Radio, Piquant LLC, for $255,000, alleging that the transfer of assets from Progress Media to Piquant LLC was a "sham" transaction designed specifically to avoid the claims of Air America's creditors. The suit was an attempt by Multicultural Broadcasting to enforce a November 2004 judgment against Piquant. Multicultural Broadcasting sought over $1.5 million in damages from Piquant LLC. Piquant LLC reportedly subsequently settled out of court on November 18, 2005.

A report issued by the New York City Department of Investigation said it had uncovered evidence that director, Charles Rosen, allegedly collected another $69,000 from money "stolen from public agencies." The report said Charles Rosen gave untrue information to the investigators and invoked his Fifth Amendment rights against self-incrimination. It also found that Gloria Wise's executives deliberately obstructed the DOI's investigation by "falsifying records, fabricating and back dating documents, and being untruthful in interviews."

Charles Rosen led Gloria Wise from 1993 until his resignation. He pleaded guilty to felony charges of grand larceny and forgery, and obstruction of government administration.

David Goodfriend said in testimony that Rosen's brother, Jacob Rosen called him and said that Evan Cohen had offered to "invest" in his company. Mr. Cohen refused to comment on his "interactions" with Jacob Rosen. Jacob Rosen also gave no comment. "The deeper one looks into this mess, the wider it becomes. Now we have two possible fraudulent conveyances of sorts, one involving Progress/Piquant and the other a money-laundering conspiracy involving the Rosen brothers and Evan Cohen."

== Air America's response ==
In response to this report, Air America Radio's owners, Piquant LLC, issued a press release stating that the alleged "mismanagement and corruption at Gloria Wise Boys and Girls Club" was "absolutely disgraceful." In addition, the press release stated that although Piquant had "no obligation to Progress Media's business activities", Piquant had "agreed months ago to fully compensate the Gloria Wise Boys & Girls Club as a result of this transaction". Furthermore, in an Air America radio monologue on August 8, 2005, Al Franken stated, "...Rob Glaser, the new guy, who is the head of this new company Piquant, said OK, we don't legally have to pay it back, because we're a different company I guess, but we morally do, so they start making arrangements to pay it back." However, Piquant's press release and Franken's paraphrasing of Rob Glaser appear at odds with a settlement agreement between Piquant LLC, Evan Cohen, and Rex Sorensen. This agreement includes details of the transfer of Air America Radio assets and specific liabilities from Progress Media to Piquant including the funds owed by Progress Media to Gloria Wise. No details surrounding the terms of the loan, or the repayment thereof, were included in the settlement agreement.

Al Franken, commenting on the case during his radio show, characterized Cohen as "a crook" and said "I don't know why they did it, and I don't know where the money went. I don't know if it was used for operations, which I imagine it was. I think he was robbing Peter to pay Paul." Franken also stated that he knew nothing of the details of the loan between Gloria Wise and Progress Media.

== Settlement ==
On September 8, 2005, Danny Goldberg, CEO of Air America, announced that the board of directors of the network's owner had accelerated its payment schedule and deposited the full $875,000 into the escrow account to settle the loan from the Gloria Wise Boys and Girls Club. Goldberg stated that Al Franken's signature on the agreement between Piquant LLC and Evan Cohen "was simply to waive his own claims in order to facilitate the transaction and allow the network to survive under new ownership." Mr. Goldberg said the portion of the agreement that listed the Gloria Wise claim of $875,000 did not apply to Mr. Franken, who was not an investor. "Al Franken does not have and never had any responsibility for this loan", Mr. Goldberg said in a written statement. "His role at Air America was then and remains today as on-air talent."

The New York City Department of Investigation has commented:

DOI asked Air America to repay the $875,000 to an escrow account controlled by DOI. Thereafter, Air America repaid only $50,000 to an escrow account that is not controlled by DOI. DOI is pleased that Piquant LLC, the current owner of Air America, has agreed to DOI's request that, in lieu of making $50,000 quarterly payments, Piquant transfer the full $875,000 to the escrow account.

In September 2006, Air America paid back the loan.
