= Bronx News =

American newspaper

- Front page of the Bronx News for March 15–19, 2008.
- Type: Weekly newspaper
- Owner: Hagedorn Communications
- Founded: 1975; 51 years ago
- Language: English
- Headquarters: Bronx, New York
- Website: sites.google.com/site/bronxnews/

The Bronx News is a weekly newspaper that covers the entire Bronx. Founded in 1975, the Bronx News is known for its headlines and reporting. News stories range from crime, sports, entertainment and politics. The front page appears in color, but photos inside the newspaper appear in black and white.

In 1999, Bronx News received attention for its coverage of the Amadou Diallo shooting. Recently stories about the NYPD ban on the Bronx Puerto Rican Day festival and the Co-op City kickback scandal have received wider attention.

In 2005, Bronx News revealed how officials at a Bronx charity, Gloria Wise Boys and Girls Club, had misappropriated funds from the charity and transferred some of the money to liberal radio network Air America Radio. A July 29, 2005 Washington Times article highlighted how the Bronx News covered the scandal ahead of the major media. Since the weekly did not have a Web site yet, some liberal bloggers questioned if the Bronx News really existed. By contrast, other Bronx newspapers such as the Bronx Times-Reporter, the Bronx Press-Review, and the Norwood News had established Web sites years earlier.

In April 2008, the Bronx News launched Bxnews.net (www.bxnews.net), a Web site devoted to bringing the news of the Bronx to its readers. Bxnews.net provides breaking news as well as links to other sites and publications regarding the borough. Upon its launching founder and editor Dan Gesslein wanted to use the site's unlimited potential to showcase local unsigned talent including, rappers, singers, dancers and artists, the goal being to find the next JLo.

Bxnews.net posts news from the four newspapers that make up the Bronx group of Hagedorn Communications publications.

- Bronx News is mailed to subscribers and is sold on news stands. At 35 cents, it remains the least expensive of the Bronx weeklies.
- Parkchester News is the only newspaper delivered to all the residents within the Parkchester development. The paper received praise for its critical reporting on the multimillion-dollar renovation of the 70-year-old complex.
- Co-op City News is the only independent newspaper delivered to all the residents of Co-op City.
- Riverdale News for the residents of Riverdale.

In addition to the Bronx newspapers, Hagedorn Communications also publishes Real Estate Weekly, Brokers Weekly, El Vocero/US and Town & Village.

In 1993, Christopher Hagedorn, the Bronx News's publisher, was charged with falsifying circulation figures in order to get better postal rates.

== Regular columnists ==
In addition to covering news and publishing editorials, the Bronx News publishes several columns by former and current local writers. Mary V. Lauro, a member of the Wakefield Taxpayers and Civic League in the Bronx, writes "Wakefield Area News." Robert Press, a member of the Committee of One-Hundred Democrats, covers borough politics for "100 Percent." Father Robert Gorman, a Catholic priest and the chairman of Community Board 12 in the Bronx, writes about community issues for "Community Board News." Rich Mancuso and Vinny Iovieno have regular columns that cover professional, college, and high school sports. Mancuso occasionally writes about professional wrestling as well. Previous columnists have included: Anthony Rivieccio, who wrote about Personal Finance in "The Problem Solver" and "Financial Focus" and community events in "North Bronx Thinktank." The late Tony Rizzo wrote about politics. A conservative Republican, Rizzo became a sharp critic of Guy Velella, the borough's only Republican elected official and Bronx GOP chairman. Rizzo wrote for the paper until his death in 1995. In the late 1970s and early 1980s, the late Joseph Savino, a Republican City Councilman-at-large in the Bronx, had his own column, "Where I Stand," about politics.

== Feud with Congressman Eliot L. Engel ==
Publisher Christopher Hagedorn has often used his Bronx newspapers to attack Bronx Democratic Congressman Eliot L. Engel, who was elected in 1988. Hagedorn believes that Engel, then an Assemblyman, was behind a failed effort in 1988 to evict the Co-op City News from its offices in Co-op City. Since 1988, Hagedorn has published numerous editorials and articles attacking Engel and even reprinted critical articles about him that have been published in other newspapers. Hagedorn has often endorsed Engel's opponents in the Democratic primary and the general election but the Congressman always won re-election to Congress. In 2000, Hagedorn intensified his campaign against Engel when the leadership of the powerful Bronx County Democratic organization decided to support former Assemblyman and City Councilman Larry Seabrook at the primary against Engel. Seabrook, whose campaign was plagued with problems, lost the primary to Engel by a wide margin.

In the last decade, Hagedorn's newspapers have mostly ignored Engel, but the two remain at odds.
