= Visible: Out on Television =

- Promotional poster
- Genre: Documentary
- Directed by: Ryan White
- Narrated by: Janet Mock; Margaret Cho; Asia Kate Dillon; Neil Patrick Harris; Lena Waithe
- Composer: Blake Neely
- Country of origin: United States
- Original language: English
- No. of episodes: 5

Production
- Executive producers: Wilson Cruz; Wanda Sykes; Jessica Hargrave; Ryan White
- Producers: Charles Annenberg-Weingarten; Wendy Abrams; Tommee May; Explore Films; David Bender (principal producer); David Permut (principal producer)
- Editors: Kate Amend; Rejh Cabrera; Mark Harrison
- Camera setup: Single camera
- Production company: Sykes Entertainment Incorporated

Original release
- Network: Apple TV+
- Release: February 14, 2020

Visible: Out on Television is a documentary miniseries about the representation of LGBTQ+ people in television, both on-screen and behind the camera. Directed by Ryan White, all 5 episodes were released on Apple TV+ on February 14, 2020.

The five episodes are broadly chronological; each involving a theme — The Dark Ages, Television as a Tool, The Epidemic, Breakthroughs, and The New Guard — the miniseries combines archive footage with new interviews of LGBTQ+ people in the television industry.

== Episodes ==
| No. | Title | Directed by | Original release date |
|---|---|---|---|
| 1 | "The Dark Ages" | Ryan White | February 14, 2020 |
| 2 | "Television as a Tool" | Ryan White | February 14, 2020 |
| 3 | "The Epidemic" | Ryan White | February 14, 2020 |
| 4 | "Breakthroughs" | Ryan White | February 14, 2020 |
| 5 | "The New Guard" | Ryan White | February 14, 2020 |

== Reception ==
=== Critical reception ===
On review aggregator Rotten Tomatoes, the miniseries holds an approval rating of 100% based on 14 reviews, with an average rating of 8.67/10. The website's critical consensus reads, "Well-crafted and often powerful, Visible: Out on Television is as vital and vibrant as the community at its center." On Metacritic, which uses a weighted average, the miniseries has a score of 89 out of 100 based on 7 reviews, indicating "universal acclaim".

=== Accolades ===
| Award | Date of ceremony | Category | Recipient(s) | Result | Ref. |
|---|---|---|---|---|---|
| Dorian Awards | January 8, 2020 | Best Current Affairs Program | Visible: Out on Television | Nominated | |
| GLAAD Media Awards | April 8, 2021 | Outstanding Documentary | Visible: Out on Television | Nominated | |

== See also ==
- The Celluloid Closet (1995), a documentary film about LGBTQ+ representation in film
