= James A. Forbes =

American minister

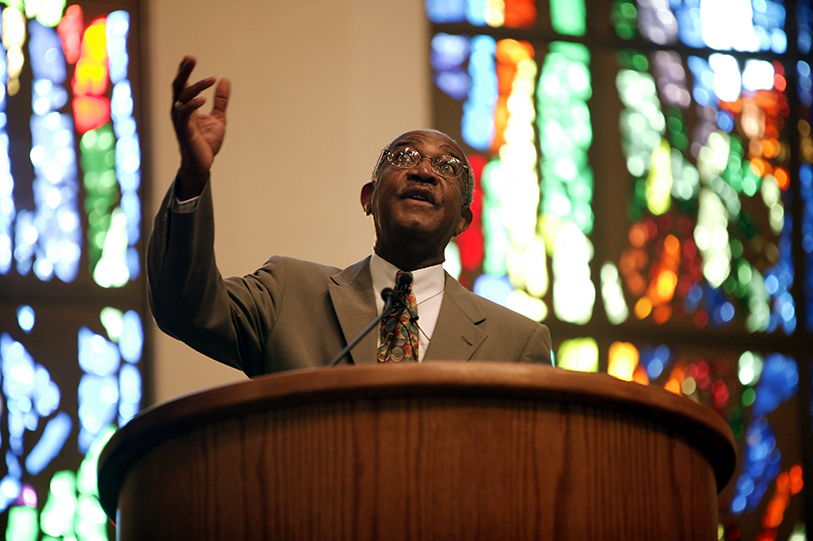
Rev. James Alexander Forbes

James Alexander Forbes Jr. is the Senior Minister Emeritus of the Riverside Church, an interdenominational (American Baptist and United Church of Christ) church on the Upper West Side of Manhattan, New York City. He was the first African American minister to lead this multicultural congregation, and served it for 18 years.

== Early life and education ==
James Forbes Jr. was born in Burgaw, North Carolina, son of James Forbes and Mabel Clemmons Forbes. His family moved first to Goldsboro, North Carolina then to Raleigh, where he grew up.

Forbes attended college at Howard University in Washington, D.C., where he earned a B.S. degree in chemistry in 1957. He was called to the ministry in 1956 and in 1962 he completed a Master of Divinity Degree from Union Theological Seminary in New York City. He earned a Doctor of Ministry Degree from Colgate Rochester Divinity School in Rochester, New York, in 1975, after beginning his pastoring and teaching careers.

Forbes became ordained in both the American Baptist Churches and the Original United Holy Church of America.

== Career ==
From 1976 to 1989, Forbes taught preaching at Union Theological Seminary. In 1985 he became the first Joe R. Engle Professor of Preaching. After being called as senior minister by Riverside Church, he became an adjunct professor. Dr. Forbes also teaches at Auburn Theological Seminary in New York.

On June 1, 1989, Forbes was installed as the fifth Senior Minister of the Riverside Church, succeeding the Rev. William Sloane Coffin. Forbes was the first African American to serve as Senior Minister of one of the largest multicultural congregations in the nation. The church stands on the border of the Morningside Heights and Harlem neighborhoods, and serves an interdenominational congregation.

He helped support Pernessa C. Seele's efforts with the first years of the Harlem Week of Prayer for Healing of AIDS, the start of a national movement to deal with public health issues through communities of faith. She founded the Balm in Gilead, Inc., which continues the work with thousands of congregations such as Riverside Church.

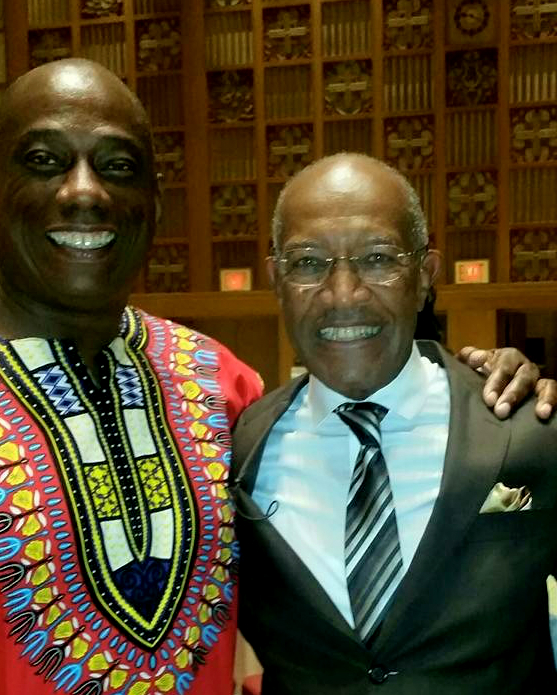
Forbes (right) with opera star and activist Stacey Robinson in 2015.

Forbes also brought Riverside Church to play a role in the redevelopment of Harlem, with the consortium of churches in Harlem Congregations for Community Improvement.

He brought his charismatic gift of preaching to the congregation and attracted new members.

Rev. Forbes participated in a Drum Major Institute-sponsored event titled, "The Power of Restorative Justice with San Francisco Sheriff Michael Hennessey".

On June 1, 2007, after 18 years of service, Forbes officially retired from this position to become president of the Healing of the Nations Foundation, a national ministry of healing and spiritual revitalization.

In 2009, Forbes authored the book Whose Gospel: A Concise Guide to Progressive Protestantism, in which he offers a compelling vision of progressive social change and addresses the most crucial issues of our time—poverty, war, women's equality, racial justice, sexuality, and the environment.

Forbes hosted the radio program The Time Is Now, which aired weekends on the Air America Radio network until July 28, 2007.

He is a member of Chi Phi fraternity. He is a member of Alpha Phi Alpha fraternity.

== Marriage and family ==
He married Bettye Franks from San Antonio, Texas. They have one son, James A. Forbes III.

== Legacy and honors ==
- 2010 - Forbes was awarded the "Ossie Davis Human Rights Lifetime Achievement Award" by the Westchester County Human Rights Commission on December 10, 2010.
- 2003 - Forbes was featured on Speaking to Power: A 'NOW With Bill Moyers' Special Edition, PBS, 26 Dec 2003.
- 1996 - In a Baylor University worldwide survey of 341 seminary professors and editors of religious periodicals, Forbes was voted one of the "12 Most Effective Preachers" in the English-speaking world.
- 1993 and 1984 - Ebony magazine named Forbes one of the US's greatest Black preachers.
- Howard University's Alumni Charter Day Award for Distinguished Post-Graduate Achievement in Ministry.
