= Corio =

Corio may refer to:

- Corio, Piedmont, a commune in the province of Turin, northern Italy
- Corio, Victoria, a residential and industrial area in Geelong, Victoria, Australia
  - Corio railway station
- Division of Corio, an Australian electoral division in the state of Victoria
- Corio (company), a Dutch real estate investment company
- Corio (surname), an Italian surname
