= Mike Papantonio =

American lawyer and radio talk show host (born 1953)

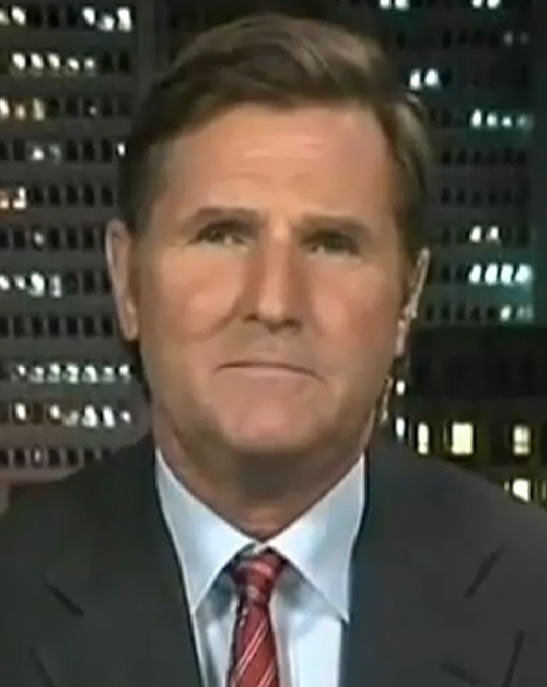
- Papantonio in 2012
- Born: October 24, 1953 (age 72); New York City, U.S.
- Education: University of Florida; Cumberland School of Law (JD)
- Occupations: Tort lawyer; TV host; radio host; writer
- Years active: 1982–present

James Michael Papantonio (born October 24, 1953) is an American torts lawyer, television presenter, radio talk show host and writer. He has been inducted into the Trial Lawyer Hall of Fame.

As a trial lawyer, Papantonio co-hosts Ring of Fire, a nationally syndicated progressive weekly radio program, with Farron Cousins, where he is referenced as America's Lawyer. In December 2016, Papantonio began hosting a program on YouTube called America's Lawyer.

== Early life and education ==
Papantonio was born on October 24, 1953 in New York City.

He graduated from DeSoto County High School, Arcadia, Florida. He subsequently graduated from the University of Florida with a degree in advertising, and received his J.D. from Cumberland School of Law. He was admitted to The Florida Bar in 1982 and the bar of the United States District Court for the Middle District of Florida in 1983.

== Law career ==
Papantonio is a senior partner in the Pensacola, Florida-based Levin Papantonio Law Firm, a mass torts firm. Within the lawyer community, Mike Papantonio is known for his work in mass torts, product liability, personal injury, and wrongful death cases, and has returned numerous verdicts of multi-million dollar damages.

He has been listed in Best Lawyers in America since 1999, and has written several books, including the legal thriller Law and Disorder; Resurrecting Aesop: Fables Lawyers Should Remember; Clarence Darrow, the Journeyman; and In Search of Atticus Finch, A Motivational Book for Lawyers, as well as Defenses You Can Count on in an Asbestosis Case and How to Prove a Sick Building Case. He also co-authored Closing Arguments–The Last Battle with Fred Levin.

In 2004, Papantonio helped launch a nationwide organization called Mass Torts Made Perfect, an organization for injury attorneys.

== Radio and video broadcasting ==
The radio broadcast Ring of Fire began in 2004 and was syndicated by the now defunct Air America Radio until January 2010. Papantonio was also involved at Air America as a member of the Board of Directors, and as a co-contributor to the New York Times bestseller, Air America, the Playbook, a collection of essays, transcripts, and interviews by network personalities released in the run-up to the 2006 congressional elections. Papantonio has appeared regularly as a contributor on Fox News, MSNBC, and CNN.

His role on Ring of Fire was featured in the 2006 documentary Jesus Camp, in which he offers commentary on many of the scenes depicted. According to DVD commentary by the film's directors, Papantonio was added to the film later on because they felt there wasn't any "tension" in it, and they wanted another viewpoint.

On the weekly show America's Lawyer, Papantonio, a Methodist, often criticizes the Christian right. He has said that "I come from a pretty strong spiritual center, but it doesn't change the way I judge people. Simply put, the Sermon on the Mount makes much more sense to me than the frenzied rantings of America's new 'religious right'. They have become an element of American politics that threatens our sense of decency as well as our democracy." Papantonio has called Republican politicians "an entire collection of ass clowns."

== Controversies ==
In March 2024, Papantonio, who is an organizer and founder of the conference Mass Torts Made Perfect, walked back on decision to invite actor Mark Ruffalo as a speaker due to the fact that at the 96th Academy Awards Ruffalo expressed support for ceasefire after Israel's invasion of the Gaza a few months earlier.

== Awards ==
- In 2011, Papantonio was awarded the Perry Nichols Award, the highest honor given by the Florida Justice Association, a lobbying organization for plaintiff lawyers.
- In 2014, the Stephen and Sandra Sheller Center for Social Justice of Temple University Beasley School of Law honored Papantonio for his outstanding contributions to social justice.
- In 2015, Papantonio was inducted into the Trial Lawyer Hall of Fame.

== Published works ==
Papantonio's published works include:

- A Death in Arcadia - A Legal Thriller (2026)
- The Middleman - A Legal Thriller (2025)
- Suspicious Activity – A Legal Thriller (2024)
- Inhuman Trafficking – A Legal Thriller (2021)
- Law and Addiction – A Legal Thriller (2019)
- Law and Vengeance – A Legal Thriller (2017)
- Law and Disorder – A Legal Thriller (2016)
- Closing Arguments – The Last Battle (co-author) (2003)
- Resurrecting AESOP – Fables Lawyers Should Remember (2000)
- Clarence Darrow, The Journeyman – Lessons for the Modern Lawyer (1997)
- In Search of Atticus Finch – A Motivational Book for Lawyers (1996)
- Defenses You Can Count on in an Asbestosis Case
- How to Prove a Sick Building Case

== Films and documentaries ==
- Oxy Kingpins (2021)
- The Devil We Know (2018)
- Beyond Pollution (2012)
- Warning: This Pill May Be Hazardous to Your Health (Yaz) (2011)
- Jesus Camp (2006)
