= Angie Coiro =

American radio host

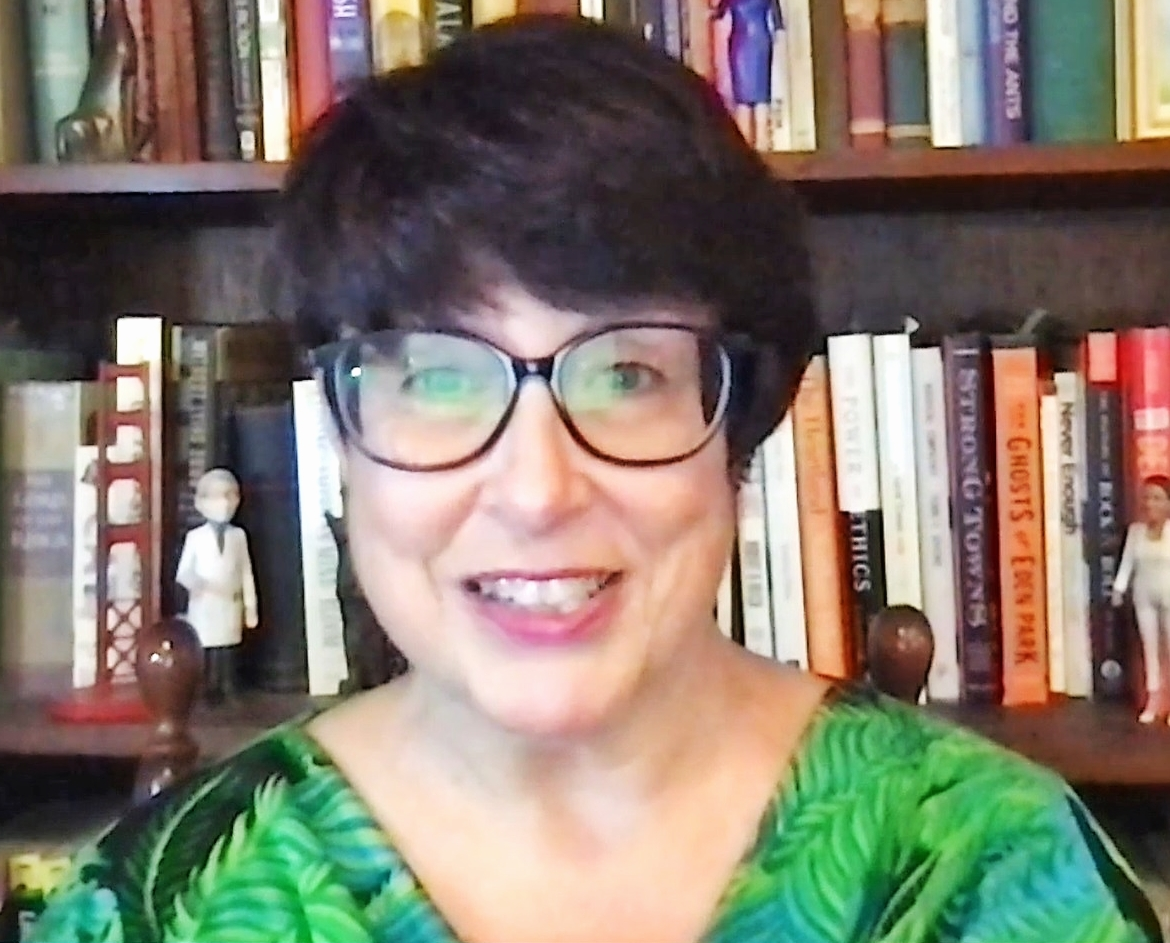
Coiro for Kepler's Literary Foundation in 2021

Angie Coiro is an American talk radio host. She is the host and senior producer of In Deep with Angie Coiro (formerly known as The Green Show). Prior to that, she was the host of Mother Jones Radio on Air America Radio. The program was broadcast every Sunday until it was canceled in 2007.

Coiro began her broadcasting career in Indiana at WETL-FM, and continued at KGU-AM in Honolulu, eventually moving to San Francisco for an announcer stint at National Public Radio KALW-FM. In 1990 she moved to National Public Radio station KQED, reporting traffic, and filling in for Michael Krasny's show Forum on Fridays. Her show on KKGN was briefly canceled as of December 31, 2008. KKGN management would not comment on her departure. The show returned to Green 960 (KKGN) on March 30, 2009, as an independent production and was renamed as "LIVE FROM THE LEFT COAST with Angie Coiro" on June 9, 2009. Coiro is noted for her upbeat and civil manner, even with combative guests.

"In Deep with Angie Coiro" began as The Angie Coiro Show on local San Francisco radio, and became an independent production in 2007. She focuses on "genuine conversations - real give and take with smart thinkers, entertaining personalities, and influential political figures. In a world of short sound bites, quick cuts, and extravagant production, [she] produce[s] 'one full hour on one intriguing topic'" on KALW San Francisco and KZSU Stanford, CA. It ended in 2021. Coiro joined the staff as the journalist in residence at Kepler's Literary Foundation (KLF) in 2016, where she hosts the series "This Is Now." The series is recorded live at Menlo College in Atherton, and at Kepler's Books in Menlo Park, free of charge. Angie has been a frequent fill-in host for KGO Radio San Francisco.

== See also ==
- Air America Radio
- Mother Jones
- KNEW (AM)
- KALW
- KZSU (FM)
- KGO (AM)
