= KCLM =

Coordinates: 34.910°N 120.187°W

- Santa Maria, California; United States
- Broadcast area: Santa Maria—Lompoc, California
- Frequency: 89.7 MHz (HD Radio)
- Branding: KCLU Central Coast

Programming
- Format: Public radio
- Affiliations: NPR

Ownership
- Owner: California Lutheran University
- Sister stations: KCLU, KCLU-FM, KSYV

History
- First air date: December 15, 2005
- Former call signs: KHFR (2002–2013)
- Call sign meaning: Disambiguation of parent station KCLU-FM

Technical information
- Licensing authority: FCC
- Facility ID: 87300
- Class: B
- ERP: 2,450 watts
- HAAT: 569 meters (1,867 ft)
- Translator: 92.1 K221FV (San Luis Obispo)

Links
- Public license information: Public file; LMS
- Website: KCLU.org

KCLM (89.7 FM) is a non-commercial radio station that is licensed to Santa Maria, California and serves the Santa Maria—Lompoc area. It is rebroadcast via translator K221FV in San Luis Obispo, California on 92.1 FM. Both KCLM and the translator are owned by California Lutheran University and air a public radio format, simulcasting KCLU-FM in Thousand Oaks, California.

== History ==
=== KHFR (2002–2013) ===
The Federal Communications Commission (FCC) granted a construction permit to build the station, given the call letters KHFR, in 2002. In June 2005, KHFR received permission from the FCC to start test broadcasts; the station was officially licensed on December 15. KHFR was originally owned by Family Radio, a non-profit radio network headed by Harold Camping. As a non-commercial operation, the station sold no airtime; the few outside ministries that air on Family Radio are not charged. Programming included traditional Christian music, along with Christian fundamentalist teaching and preaching.

=== KCLM (2013–present) ===
On January 25, 2013, Family Radio sold KHFR and translator K221FV in San Luis Obispo, California to California Lutheran University for $475,000; the transaction closed in May. The plan was for the two stations to simulcast public radio station KCLU-FM in Thousand Oaks, California. On May 6, KHFR changed its callsign to KCLM. The station's signal was modified to provide coverage from the Santa Ynez Valley to Pismo Beach, although it can be heard as far north as Morro Bay. KCLU moved the translator to 92.1 FM in San Luis Obispo, providing coverage to parts of the city where the primary 89.7 FM signal is blocked.
