= Politically Direct =

Politically Direct is a weekly radio talk show that airs Sunday afternoons on the Air America Radio network. David Bender serves as host.

The show originally aired on weekends but eventually was moved to an 8-9 PM nightly slot. In May 2007 the show was cancelled in favor of a show called The Air Americans, to which Bender was also a contributor. (That show was cancelled in August 2007.)

Politically Direct returned to Air America on June 8, 2008, as a replacement for the cancelled Seder on Sundays program. The show airs in Seder's former timeslot of 4 to 7 PM. Bender returned to host, leaving his position on accompanying weekend show Ring of Fire to do so.

== Background ==
Politically Direct started as a weekend show on Air America in 2005. In September 2006, it was moved to a nightly time slot. Host David Bender started at Air America in 2004 as the network's political director. During the 2004 elections, Bender and fellow Air America personality Rachel Maddow hosted a Sunday show that summarized the weekend political talk shows, with an emphasis on countering bias and "spin" pertaining to the race. After the election, the show was moved to a regular slot on weekends, and followed its current format of in-depth interviews.

The theme song of Politically Direct is "If I Were You" by the group Venice.
