= Betsy Rosenberg =

American journalist

Betsy Rosenberg (born August 1955) is an American broadcast journalist specializing in environmental media. She was a CBS Radio News anchor in New York City from April 1988 to mid-1991. In 1997, she launched the "Trash Talk" Eco Series on KCBS in San Francisco, timed with Earth Day events. She later hosted EcoTalk on Air America Radio, which aired weeknights from 9:00 to 10:00 PM Eastern Time until its final broadcast on May 19, 2007. Rosenberg has been a guest and commentator on television and radio beyond her shows: appearing on outlets such as Fox’s Sean Hannity Show.

She founded an advocacy campaign, Don’t Be Fueled! – Mothers for Clean and Safe Vehicles, launched in 2002, aimed at promoting fuel efficiency and cleaner vehicle options. Rosenberg also hosted The Green Front on Progressive Radio Network, an internet radio station focused on environmental issues. She was a co-founder and lead interviewer at Green TV, where she contributed to developing its website.

== History ==
=== Career ===
- KCBS reporter and anchor
- CBS Radio Network anchor
- Podcaster on the Air America Radio

== Personal life ==
Rosenberg is Jewish and married with three children.
