= KCLU-FM =

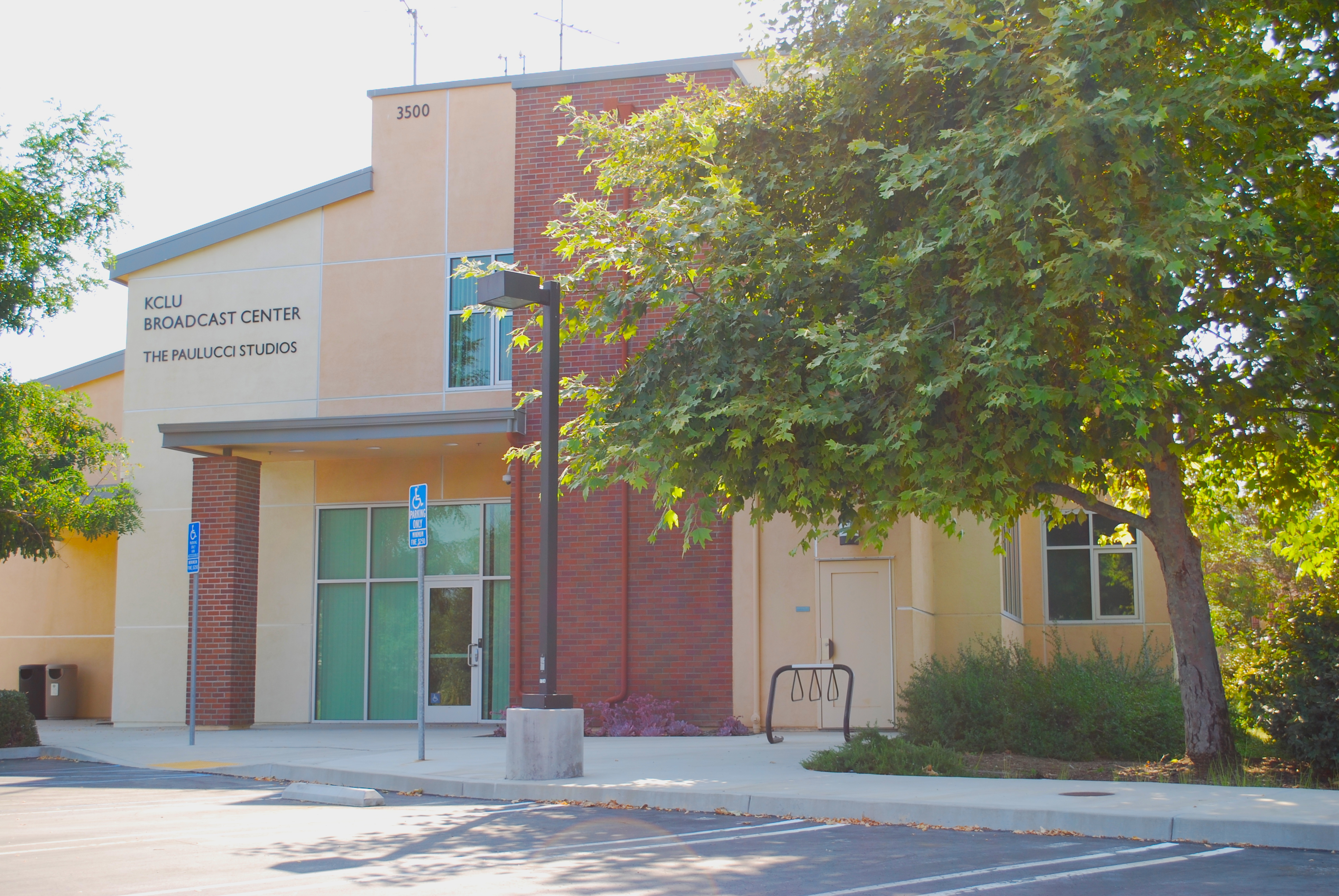
- Thousand Oaks, California; United States
- Broadcast area: Ventura County, California
- Frequency: 88.3 MHz (HD Radio)
- Branding: KCLU

Programming
- Format: Public radio
- Affiliations: NPR

Ownership
- Owner: California Lutheran University

History
- First air date: October 20, 1994
- Call sign meaning: California Lutheran University

Technical information
- Licensing authority: FCC
- Facility ID: 8220
- Class: B1
- ERP: 3,200 watts
- HAAT: 158 meters (518 ft)
- Transmitter coordinates: 34.218°N 118.946°W
- Repeater: See § Stations

Links
- Public license information: Public file; LMS
- Webcast: kclustream.callutheran.edu/kclump3
- Website: kclu.org

KCLU-FM (88.3 FM) is a non-commercial radio station that is licensed to Thousand Oaks, California and serves Ventura County. The station, owned by California Lutheran University, is a member of NPR and airs local news, weather forecasts, and traffic conditions as well as a wide variety of public radio programming for California's South Coast of California and Central Coast of California, through additional signals listed below.

The station has won more than 200 journalism awards for its local news coverage, including a national Edward R. Murrow Award, and four national Society of Professional Journalists Awards for its news coverage.

KCLU-FM broadcasts in HD Radio.

== History ==
KCLU-FM first signed on October 20, 1994 and originally broadcast a mix of news/talk and jazz programming. By the late 2000s, the station reduced its jazz programming and aired news/talk around the clock.

On June 19, 2008, California Lutheran University (CLU) purchased KIST (1340 AM) in Santa Barbara, California from R & R Radio, LLC for $1.44 million. On October 7, the university converted the station to non-commercial educational status and changed its call letters to KCLU.

In January 2013, CLU purchased KHFR in Santa Maria, California and its translator K209CE in San Luis Obispo from Family Radio for $450,000. The sale closed that May, and KHFR's call sign was changed to KCLM. The station began simulcasting KCLU-FM after repairs were completed.

As an NPR member station, KCLU-FM broadcasts a wide variety of public radio programming. KCLU airs the NPR shows Morning Edition, All Things Considered, Wait Wait...Don't Tell Me!, Here and Now and Fresh Air with Terry Gross. Other programs include The World from Public Radio Exchange (PRX), This American Life, and the BBC World Service. The station previously broadcast Car Talk prior to its cancellation.

== Stations ==
KCLU-FM's network of repeater and translator stations extends its reach across California's Central Coast as far north as San Luis Obispo County.

Full-power repeaters of KCLU-FM
Call sign	Frequency	City of license	Facility ID
KCLU	1340 AM	Santa Barbara, California	10327
KSYV	96.7 FM	Solvang, California	51185
KCLM	89.7 FM	Santa Maria, California	87300

Those stations feed the following translators:

Call sign	Frequency	City of license	FID	FCC info	Notes
K221FV	92.1 FM	San Luis Obispo, California	81483	LMS	Relays KCLM
K272DT	102.3 FM	Santa Barbara, California	84008	LMS	Relays KCLU

== Awards ==
KCLU has won more than 70 RTNA Golden Mike Awards, 25 Regional Edward R. Murrow Awards, and 50 APTRA Awards since 2001.

Year	Awards	Category	Recipient	Result	Source
2018	Associated Press Television and Radio Association (APTRA)	Best Public Service – Radio Class II	Lance Orozco, "The Thomas Fire"	Won	
2018	Associated Press Television and Radio Association (APTRA)	Best Sports Feature Story — Radio Class II	Lance Orozco, "LA Has Rams, Chargers, But Ventura County has Dallas Cowboys"	Won	
2018	Associated Press Television and Radio Association (APTRA)	Best Use Of Sound — Radio Class II	Lance Orozco, "It's Fried Fun with Food at the Ventura County Fair"	Won	
2018	Associated Press Television and Radio Association (APTRA)	Best Use Of Sound — Radio Class II	Debra Greene, "Music Helps Dementia Patients"	Won (second place)	
2018	Associated Press Television and Radio Association (APTRA)	Best Feature — Radio Class II	Lance Orozco, "Ant Dog"	Won (second place)	
2018	Associated Press Television and Radio Association (APTRA)	Outstanding Radio News Operation — Radio Class II		Won (second place)	
2018	RTDNA Regional Edward R. Murrow Award — Region 2	Continuing Coverage — Small Market	Lance Orozco, "The Monster Inferno"	Won	
2018	RTDNA Regional Edward R. Murrow Award — Region 2	Feature Reporting — Small Market	Debra Greene, "They May Be Preschoolers, But They're Learning Science Through Unique Gardening Class On South Coast"	Won	
2018	RTDNA Regional Edward R. Murrow Award — Region 2	Hard News — Small Market	Lance Orozco, "Ventura County Mother Who Lost Son To Drug Overdose Tells Story To Spotlight Opioid Abuse"	Won	
