= Levin Papantonio Law Firm =

Florida trial law firm

Levin Papantonio law firm
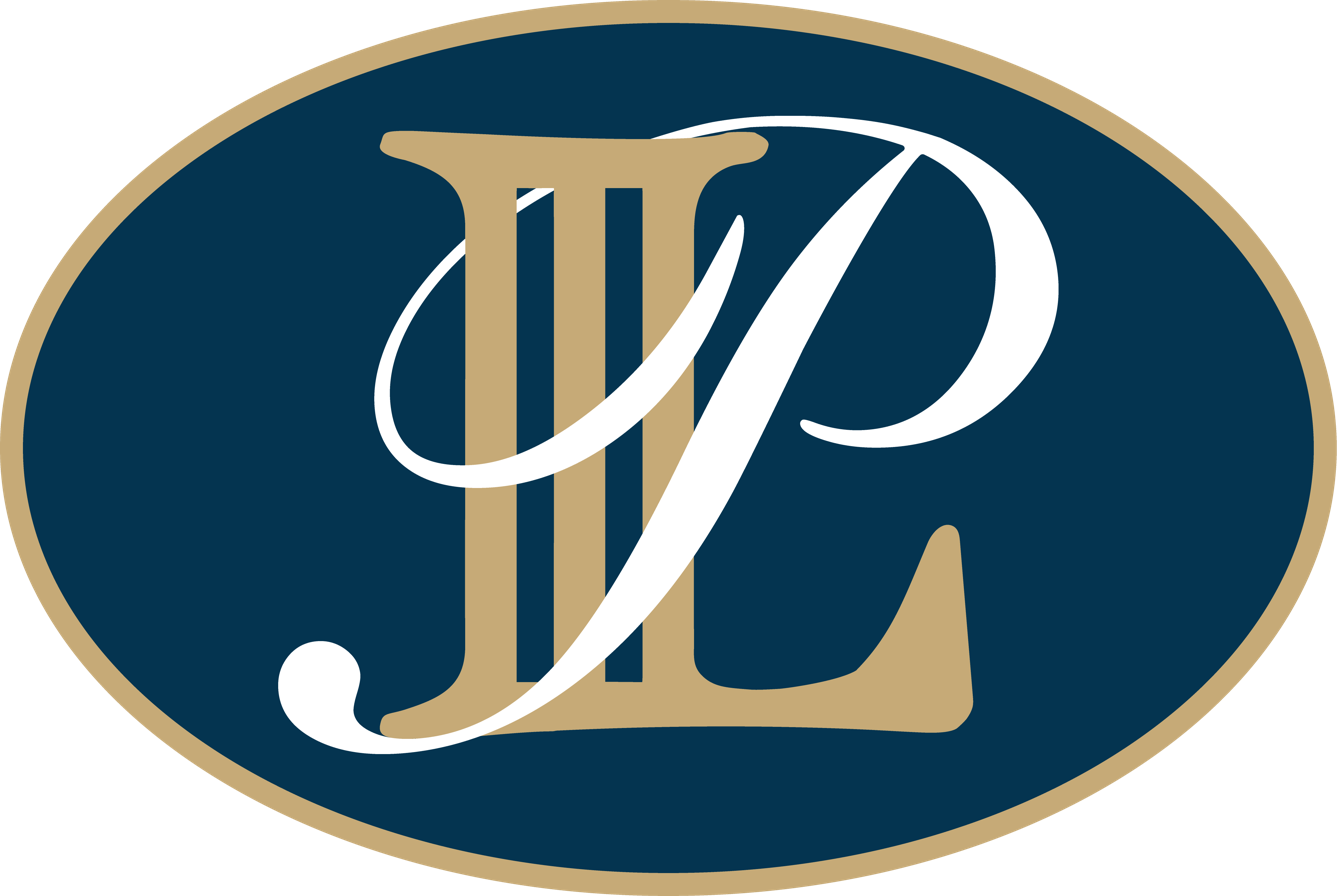
- Headquarters: Pensacola, Florida
- Major practice areas: mass tort
- Key people: David Levin, Reubin Askew
- Date founded: 1955
- Website: Official website

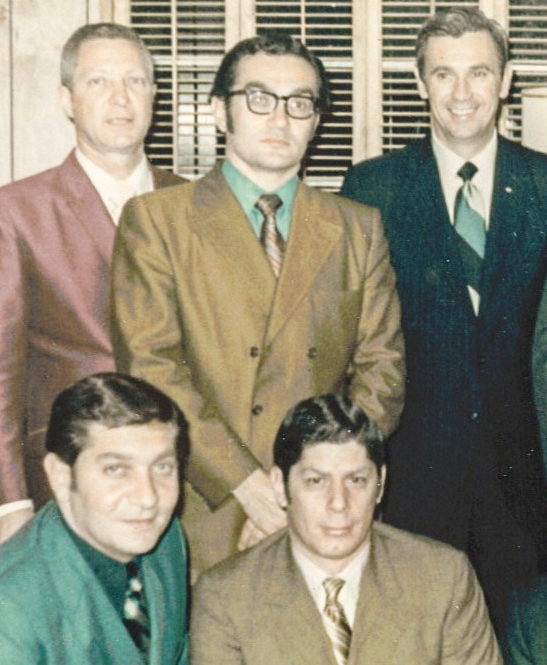
Levin & Askew in the early 1960s. David Levin (top, middle), Reubin Askew (top right), and Fred Levin (bottom left).

Levin, Papantonio, Proctor, Buchanan, O'Brien, Barr, & Mougey, P.A. is an American law firm based in Pensacola, Florida, founded in 1955 by David Levin and Reubin Askew, originally under the name Levin & Askew. It is best known for its prominent role in the field of mass tort litigation, where it started and continues to host the biannual conference called Mass Torts Made Perfect. In 2016, the National Law Journal recognized Levin Papantonio as one of America's Elite Trial Law Firms.

== Notable cases and activities ==
The law firm received national recognition in 1980 after receiving an $18 million jury verdict against Louisville & Nashville Railroad after one of its trains derailed in Pensacola, Florida, killing a young doctor and his wife, and leaving their two young children orphaned. The jury verdict was the largest compensatory damage verdict in U.S. history at the time. Because of the size of the verdict, the firm was featured in an April 1981 issue of US magazine.

The law firm again made national news in 1989 with its creation of the first live, prime-time talk show to air lawyers providing free legal advice. The show became a lightning rod for potential legal ethics issues, with critics stating: "It's obviously advertising for that law firm that is slanted at having the public believe in higher verdicts, more rights of the injury party and anti-doctor." The show resulted in two separate Florida Bar investigations, and one prosecution, when a law firm attorney admitted on-air: "I used to enjoy betting on the football games, and now they've arrested my bookie." Another time, a lawyer ranted about the medical profession and accused doctors of having a "God complex – they think they are above the law."

The law firm's most controversial act occurred in 1993 when it rewrote a Florida statute that allowed the state of Florida to sue the Tobacco Industry, and then orchestrated its passage through the state legislature. After the law was upheld by the US Supreme Court, the Tobacco Industry settled with Florida for an unprecedented $13 billion. The secretive legal maneuvering became part of the national debate on whether personal injury law was negatively impacting the American business environment, including a July 2000 article in Time magazine titled "Are Lawyers Running America?" that included a photo of Fred Levin wearing a red blazer and sunglasses and leaning on a vintage Rolls-Royce.

In a 2014 book about the firm and the topic of personal injury litigation, Josh Young wrote, "It's rare that any major mass tort in the country does not present itself to Levin Papantonio. The firm clearly is considered one of the very few 800-pound gorillas in the field. It has earned that reputation over many decades . . . ." The magazine Action Report wrote in 2014, "The restrictions on the rights and recoveries of victims of "single injury" cases ultimately moved many firms into mass torts, with the Levin Papantonio firm leading the way in Florida."

Levin Papantonio is among the firms representing plaintiffs in litigation against Novo Nordisk and Eli Lilly over the diabetes and weight-loss drugs Ozempic and Mounjaro. The lawsuits allege that the manufacturers failed to warn about serious gastrointestinal risks associated with the drugs. In 2024, following the creation of a federal multidistrict litigation, a lawyer from Levin Papantonio was appointed to the plaintiffs’ leadership committee, where the firm plays a role in managing coordinated pretrial proceedings and common claims.

== Notable members ==
Notable members of the firm have included Reubin Askew, Fred Levin, Mike Papantonio, Robert F. Kennedy, Jr., and Joe Scarborough.
