= Air America (radio network) =

American progressive talk radio network

- Type: Radio network
- Country: United States
- Broadcast area: United States (broadcast); Internet radio
- Branding: Progressive talk

Ownership
- Owner: Newsweb Radio Company
- Key people: Thom Hartmann, Al Franken, Rachel Maddow, Cenk Uygur, Jerry Springer, Marc Maron, Chuck D, Lizz Winstead, Sam Seder, Randi Rhodes, Janeane Garofalo

History
- Launch date: March 31, 2004
- Closed: January 21, 2010; (5 years, 296 days)

Coverage
- Affiliates: 66

Air America (formerly Air America Radio and Air America Media) was an American radio network specializing in progressive talk radio. It was on the air from March 2004 to January 2010.

The network was founded as a left-wing alternative to counter talk radio with a right-wing perspective. Air America featured programs with monologues by on-air personalities, guest interviews, call-ins from listeners, and news reports. Several shows had audiences of over a million listeners, and multiple weekday presenters continued on in radio, television, or politics after their time on Air America. For example, in 2008, The Thom Hartmann Program had 1.5–2 million unique listeners a week and The Lionel Show had 1.5–1.75 million unique listeners a week. Hartmann, Randi Rhodes, and Mike Malloy later had shows on other radio networks. Marc Maron started his "WTF podcast" by trespassing in Air America's studios after the network's demise, before moving to Los Angeles. Al Franken went from his show to the United States Senate, Laura Flanders went on to host her own show independently on public television, and Rachel Maddow moved her show to television on MSNBC.

The network was financially troubled, however. A scandal involving nearly $1 million in loans from a Boys & Girls Club in New York secretly transacted by Evan Cohen came out in 2005 and was a source of negative publicity. The loans were repaid, but in October 2006, mounting debts forced Air America Radio to file Chapter 11 bankruptcy. The company was acquired by New York real estate investor Stephen L. Green and his brother Mark Green, who purchased the network in March 2007 for US$4.25 million.

The company eventually changed its name from Air America Radio to Air America Media and lastly to just Air America, an effort to establish itself as a broadcaster on multiple media sources including television and the Internet, although it remained primarily a radio network. On January 21, 2010, Air America went off the air, citing difficulties with the economic environment of the time. The company filed for Chapter 7 bankruptcy and liquidated itself. Bennett Zier was the company's last CEO including through the bankruptcy and liquidation.

Sometime after the network's closure, Newsweb Corporation (owned by Chicago entrepreneur, political activist, and philanthropist Fred Eychaner, owner of Chicago's WCPT progressive talk radio station) acquired ownership of the branding.

== Programming overview ==
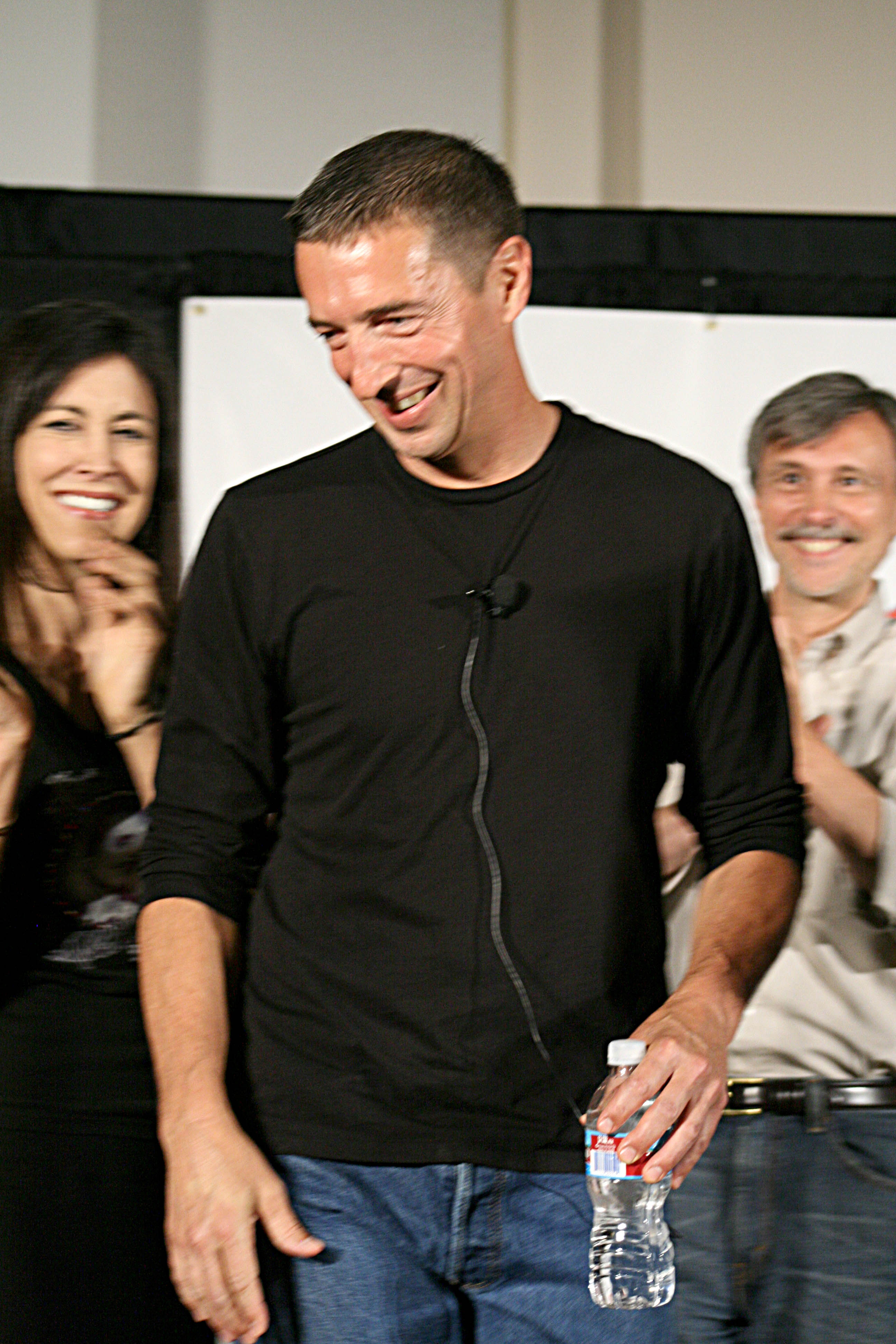
Ron Reagan, son of President Ronald Reagan, and Thom Hartmann (background, right) hosted progressive talk shows at Air America.

Air America Media's progressive talk radio programming consisted of news, talk, comedy, interviews, guest editorials, and listeners' telephone calls. The talk portions featured some extended host monologues in the classic talk radio format. Live and pre-recorded comedy routines, featuring various comedians, were also aired. As with most syndicated broadcast networks, local affiliate stations were able to air select programs or the entire schedule, subject to contractual arrangements.

=== Format ===
The shows followed a half-hour format from six minutes past the hour to 28 minutes after the hour followed by a hard break for six minutes until 34 minutes past the hour. The final hard break occurs at 58 minutes past the hour, leading into the news at the top of the hour. There was also a floating break in both the first and second half-hours. Local stations could run their own commercials, local news and weather or other features during the breaks.

=== News ===
Air America featured its own news summary breaks at the top of each hour, with content from wire services such as the Associated Press (AP) and United Press International (UPI). Some affiliates used other news services or would run their own newscasts during the six-minute "news hole" at the top of the hour. AAR later switched to AP Radio Network News, and finally Free Speech Radio News. These newscasts ended on June 29, 2007, with local stations signing up with other radio news networks.

=== Public affairs and editorials ===
The public affairs programs tended to closely follow current happenings in the news, with monologues and reflections offered by the hosts and their guests. Listener comments by phone or the Internet were worked into these segments along with the interviews.

=== Music ===
Although better known for its political shows, Air America also featured a couple of music oriented shows on weekends. On the Real featuring Chuck D had a strong music focus. The Steve Earle Show (which ended in 2007 with Earle moving to Sirius Satellite Radio) mixed music with political commentary. Also, most of the talk shows had their own theme songs, used bumper music to segue between commercials and segments, and played political novelty songs. Theme songs and bumper music were generally commercially released rock music.

=== Weekday programs ===
Air America produced sixteen hours of weekday network programming. The entire schedule was carried on the network's internet stream, and affiliates may have carried some, most or all shows.

The network's schedule as of Mid-2009:

Time	Show	Notes
5–6 a.m. ET	The Rachel Maddow Show	audio rebroadcast of the MSNBC program of the same name.
6–9 a.m. ET	The Lionel Show	redebuts in new time slot May 26, 2009. Original debut: May 14, 2007.
9 a.m. – noon ET	Montel Across America	debut: April 20, 2009; took The Lionel Show's old time slot.
12–3 p.m. ET	Live in Washington with Jack Rice	
3–6 p.m. ET	Montel Across America	debut: May 18, 2009; took Doing Time with Ron Kuby's old time slot.
6–9 p.m. ET	The Ron Reagan Show	debut: September 8, 2008. Expanded from 1 to 3 hours on February 3, 2009.
9–11 p.m. ET	Clout	with Richard Greene, moved from weekends September 4, 2007.
11 p.m. – 1 a.m. ET	This Is America with Jon Elliott	debut: September 2006 ran through May 15, 2009.
11 p.m. – 1 a.m. ET	The Nicole Sandler Show	debut: June 15, 2009; took Jon Elliott time slot.
1–3 a.m. ET	Montel Across America rebroadcast	
3–5 a.m. ET	The David Bender Show rebroadcast	

- A one-hour webcast, Breakroom Live with Maron & Seder, aired weekdays from 3-4PM Eastern. Marc Maron and Sam Seder hosted the show from the actual break room at Air America Media in New York. Breakroom Live aired its last show on July 15, 2009.

=== Weekend programs ===
On many Air America affiliates, weekends featured repeats and highlights from the network's weekday shows, combined with new original programming and some syndicated shows produced independently.

Original network programming for weekends included:

- Marc Sussman's Money Message (9–10 a.m. ET Saturday)
- State of Belief with Rev. Dr. C. Welton Gaddy (10–11 a.m. Saturday; rebroadcast 7–8 p.m. ET Sunday)
- Freethought Radio with Dan Barker and Annie Laurie Gaylor (1–2 p.m. ET Saturday)
- Go Vegan with Bob Linden (2–3 p.m. ET Saturday)
- Ring of Fire with Robert F. Kennedy Jr. and Mike Papantonio (3–6 p.m. ET Saturday)
- 7 Days in America with Carlos Watson and Arianna Huffington (6–7 p.m. ET Saturday; rebroadcast 9–10 a.m. ET Sunday)
- The Laura Flanders Show (7-10 p.m. ET Saturday and Sunday)
- Politically Direct with David Bender (4–7 p.m. ET Sunday)
- The Steve Earle Show with Steve Earle (10–11 p.m. ET Sunday)
- On The Real with Chuck D and Gia'na Garel (11 p.m.–1 a.m. ET Sunday)

=== Former programs ===
- The Al Franken Show (noon–3 p.m. ET) Aired March 31, 2004 – February 14, 2007. Originally called The O'Franken Factor. Franken left the show to run for the U.S. Senate from Minnesota.
- The Majority Report (7–10 p.m. ET) Aired March 31, 2004 – September 15, 2006. Co-hosted by Sam Seder and Janeane Garofalo
- The Randi Rhodes Show (3–7 p.m. ET, later shortened to 3–6 p.m. ET) Aired March 31, 2004 – April 3, 2008. Moved to Nova M Radio on April 10, 2008.
- Morning Sedition with Marc Maron, Sue Ellicott, and Mark Riley (6–9 a.m. ET) Aired April 1, 2004 – December 16, 2005.
- Unfiltered with Chuck D, Lizz Winstead, and Rachel Maddow (9 a.m.–noon ET) Aired April 1, 2004 – April 1, 2005.
- The Mike Malloy Show (10 p.m.–1 a.m. ET), Aired August 2, 2004 – August 30, 2006. Moved to Nova M Radio on October 30, 2006.
- Springer on the Radio with Jerry Springer (9 pm- midnight ET), Aired April 1, 2005 – September 18, 2006. Broadcast via Air America Syndication until December 8, 2006.
- Politically Direct with David Bender (8–9 p.m. ET) Aired 2005 – May 2007, then combined with The Mark Riley Show into The Air Americans.
- Air America Mornings (5–9 a.m. ET) umbrella name for Air America's morning drive-time shows: The Mark Riley Show and The Rachel Maddow Show.
- The Mark Riley Show (5–6 a.m. ET) Aired January 2006 – May 2007, then combined with Politically Direct into The Air Americans.
- This Is America with Jon Elliott with Jon Elliott, (11 p.m. – 1 a.m. ET) Aired September 2006 – May 15, 2009.
- The Young Turks with Cenk Uygur (6–9 a.m. ET), Aired September 18, 2006 – January 15, 2008.
- The Thom Hartmann Show (noon–3 p.m. ET) Aired March 2007 – February 28, 2009. Replaced the Al Franken Show. Moved to the Dial Global network.
- The Air Americans, hosted by Mark Riley with contributors David Bender, Laura Flanders, Robert F. Kennedy Jr., and Mike Papantonio. (8 pm-midnight ET) Aired May 21, 2007 – August 2007.
- American Afternoon, featuring revolving celebrity guest hosts such as Richard Belzer, Joy Behar, Ron Reagan, and Roseanne Barr. (3–6 p.m. ET) Aired April–June 2008. Aired as a replacement for Randi Rhodes, later replaced by Doin' Time with Ron Kuby.*
- EcoTalk with Betsy Rosenberg (9–10 p.m. ET), the show moved from the weekends to weeknights effective September 18, 2006. Show removed from weekday schedule May 18, 2007, and may resurface eventually on Sunday mornings.
- The Kyle Jason Show (two hours)
- Liberal Arts with Katherine Lanpher (one hour)
- Mother Jones Radio with Angie Coiro (one hour)
- So What Else Is News? with Marty Kaplan (first daily for one hour; later weekends for two hours)
- The Time Is Now with Rev. Dr. James Forbes

=== Syndication ===
On September 8, 2005, Air America Radio formed a separate syndication division, designed to offer additional programming and services to both progressive talk and other talk/music formats. Air America Syndication was used to syndicate Thom Hartmann, and later Springer on the Radio which aired at the same time as The Al Franken Show and The Sam Seder Show respectively on the regular network lineup. Springer ended his show on December 5, 2006, and Franken's ended on February 14, 2007. On January 29, 2007, Air America announced that Hartmann would replace Franken on the regular network lineup. When Air America entered bankruptcy, there were no programs syndicated as a part of Air America Syndication.

== History ==
=== Beginnings ===
In late 2002 Chicago entrepreneurs Sheldon Drobny and Anita Drobny, angered at the firing of their favorite radio host, Mike Malloy, decided to try to get Malloy syndicated nationally. At Mike's behest they called Atlanta-based radio executive Jon Sinton and requested a national berth for Malloy. The Drobnys hired Sinton as CEO of AnShell Media, and the three went about raising money. The first official fundraiser was in October 2002 at the home of Arianna Huffington. The gathering was enthusiastically attended by many Hollywood notables. Sinton's brother, broadcaster Carey Bruce Sinton, suggested calling the venture Central Air, a name that stuck until just before launch.

Around this same time, Democratic political operative Tom Athans and radio industry veteran Paul Fiddick launched Democracy Radio in Washington, D.C. Democracy Radio was an organization founded in September 2002 dedicated to creating political balance on America's commercial radio airwaves. Its concept was to develop, fund and incubate progressive oriented talk programming and retain well established radio networks to market the programs to stations around the country. Democracy Radio developed and produced talk shows that launched the national careers of Ed Schultz and Stephanie Miller.

AnShell announced its intentions publicly in a New York Times article in February 2003 in which writer Jim Rutenburg interviewed Jon Sinton about the need for a balanced national discussion. Sinton, the Drobnys and their associate, Javier Saade, a Harvard Business School grad and venture capitalist, continued to raise awareness but little money throughout 2003 by spending time in New York, Washington, D.C., and Los Angeles. Sinton met repeatedly with Al Franken to convince him to become the network's anchor talent. Franken did not commit to the enterprise, as he was worried about its sustainability.

After mentioning actress and activist Janeane Garofalo during an appearance on Judy Woodruff's Politics Today show on CNN, Sinton received a call from Garofalo stating her interest in hosting a show. On a fundraising trip to Los Angeles, Sinton, at the suggestion of Al Franken, met with Daily Show co-creator Lizz Winstead, and she would later co-host one of the original shows and be the first program manager.

In November 2003, Sinton's brother Steve Sinton left Clear Channel's talk radio division to join AAR as vice president of programming and operations.

Meanwhile, none of these talent agreements were finalized, as fundraising was difficult. The reputation of the effort was coming under duress and scrutiny, as it was announced but not taking shape. A further complication was that AnShell found itself competing against Democracy Radio for investors. During a trip to Washington, D.C., former Clinton chief of staff John Podesta suggested a young lawyer, David Goodfriend, who introduced the Drobnys and Sinton to his former college roommate, Evan Montvel Cohen, who had profited from advertising and research companies in the Pacific Rim. Having taken the idea as far as they could, the principals sold AnShell Media to Cohen and his partner, Rex Sorensen, a broadcaster from Guam, US, who formed Progress Media, with Cohen as chairman, and Mark Walsh as CEO; Sinton's title remained as president, but his impact on day-to-day operations was reduced after the sale to Cohen

=== Launch and rapid growth ===
From the hiring of Goodfriend and Walsh in the fall of 2003, the network began to take shape. Al Franken and Garafalo finally agreed to contracts, and in short order the company was able reach agreement and hire Winstead, Chuck D, comedian Marc Maron, media attorney Carl Ginsberg, and many more people. In early 2004, talent, engineers and producers were hired, a lease was signed with New York's WLIB creating a New York home and affiliate, and, at noon Eastern time on March 31, the newly renamed Air America Radio Network was launched.

Air America Radio was then the only all-progressive talk radio network. A predecessor, the UAW's I.E. America Radio Network, which was home to hosts such as Thom Hartmann, Peter Werbe, and Mike Malloy, never gained national attention. Its last day on the air was February 27, 2004, only weeks before Air America took to the airwaves. Although not a network, Democracy Radio launched The Ed Schultz Show three months prior to the launch of Air America in January 2004. The Stephanie Miller Show followed September 2004.

Franken's show was the centerpiece of Air America, and would remain so for a little less than 3 years. The show featured Franken's low-key humor, political commentary, and guest and audience participation. Randi Rhodes was also in the initial lineup.

AAR became the fastest growing network in modern radio history, increasing its listeners from 120,000 to 400,000 within three months, and reaching 2.137 million listeners per week in 2005.

=== Difficulties and turnover ===
At the time it started Air America Radio, Progress Media, (an entity created and completely controlled by Evan Cohen and his former business partner, Rex Sorenson) stated it had secured US$30 million in venture capital before its debut. The amount was later estimated by The Wall Street Journal to be closer to US$6 million; Sorensen said that an investor had backed out at the last minute.

Sorensen never identified who the supposed investor was. Sorensen served as the chief financial officer of both Progress Media, and Air America Radio. He had complete control over all funds and banking relationships for the company, and reported directly to the chairman, Evan Cohen. No one else at the company, from Walsh on down, had any control of or input to Sorensen's activities.

On April 2, 2004, the day after launching the network, CEO Mark Walsh departed the offices for good. He had been having a number of disagreements with Evan Cohen about the direction of the company, and in particular about the complete lack of financial transparency in Cohen's business dealings and fundraising efforts. Walsh was a resident of Washington, D.C., and told Cohen that he could not be part of an enterprise run in such an opaque and disruptive fashion. Walsh never returned to the offices while Cohen was chairman, and resigned from the company several weeks later.

Two weeks after the on-air debut of Air America Radio, programming was withdrawn in two key markets due to contract disputes. Multicultural Radio owned two stations contracted to carry Air America programming, in Chicago and Santa Monica, California. Air America alleged that Multicultural Radio had sold time on its Los Angeles station to both Air America and another party, and said that that was why it stopped payment on checks due to Multicultural while Air America investigated. Multicultural Radio argued that Air America had bounced a check and claimed it was owed in excess of US$1 million. Air America Radio filed a complaint in New York Supreme Court, charging breach of contract and was briefly granted an injunction to restore the network on WNTD in Chicago. On April 20, 2004, the network announced the dispute had been settled, and Air America's last day of broadcast on WNTD was April 30, 2004. The New York Supreme Court ultimately concluded that the injunction was improvidently entered and that Air America Radio's court action was without merit, dismissing Air America's complaint and awarding over US$250,000 in damages and attorneys' fees to Multicultural. According to a subsequent lawsuit filed by Multicultural, Air America Radio never paid the sums ordered by the court.

Four weeks after Air America's debut, its executive vice president for programming, Dave Logan, left the network. One week after those departures, its chairman and vice chairman, Evan Cohen and his investment partner Rex Sorensen, were forced out by the remaining investors. In a tense late night meeting, which included Franken, Saade, the Drobnys, Mark Walsh and other investors, the company found out that it had virtually no assets. It asked David Goodfriend to operate the company while a reorganization was planned and new funds were raised. Subsequently, the company had a number of acting CEO's, including outside investor Doug Kreeger and Jon Sinton for a short period.

The tumultuous early days of the network were chronicled in a fly-on-the-wall HBO documentary, Left of the Dial.

As part of a reorganization, the Progress Media board of directors bought the assets of that company, creating a new company, Piquant LLC; at around the same time, the company decided to stop trying to buy radio stations and lease air time, and to allow affiliates to carry programming outside of the network's offerings.

On February 28, 2005, a new CEO, Danny Goldberg, was named, and in April 2005, Gary Krantz was named president of the network. Ginsburg and Sinton were named co-COOs with Ginsburg in charge of operations and Sinton running programming and affiliate relations.

In December 2005, over Sinton's objections, CEO Danny Goldberg broke up the network's morning drive-time show Morning Sedition, and let comedian and co-host Marc Maron's contract lapse. While the increased overhead for the show's heavily produced format may have been a factor in the show's demise, Maron claimed that Goldberg did not "get" or agree with the comedy on the show. Maron exacerbated the conflict by calling attention to his situation during the show for several weeks, prompting a petition drive that garnered over 5,000 signatures. This was to no avail, as Maron announced on November 28 that his last show would be December 16, 2005. Maron was offered an evening show, which ran briefly on affiliate KTLK in Los Angeles, but Air America never followed through with promised national syndication and the show was cancelled in July 2006. Goldberg announced his resignation on April 6, 2006, after a little more than a year on the job. Maron guest hosted a few times in 2007, and later co-hosted a webcast program for Air America called "Breakroom Live".

Janeane Garofalo's last day as co-host of The Majority Report was on July 14, 2006. Several reasons for her departure were cited (including her outside acting responsibilities). The show ended a few months later.

By the late summer of 2006 Sinton and Ginsburg's influence was marginalized (both would leave in short order).

On August 30, 2006, nighttime host Mike Malloy was fired from the network. Malloy had hosted a nighttime show from the inception of the network. The show was vitriolic in its criticism of the right–wing. Comments included referring to the Bushes as the "Bush crime family"; right–wingers commonly were referred to as "rat bastards" and "pigs". In the two weeks before the firing, Malloy had announced an impending multi-year deal for him to stay with Air America (and to return on the air in New York City). The firing was explained as for financial reasons. Rumours persist that Malloy's criticism of Israel during its bombardment of Lebanon in the summer of 2006 may have played a role. News of his termination was conveyed via a short statement on the homepage of Malloy's website, posted by his wife/producer Kathy Bay Malloy. His final show was on August 29, 2006, filling in for Randi Rhodes. No mention of his firing was made during the broadcast. Malloy's firing drew criticism from Air America on-air talent, including Rhodes and Sam Seder. It also began a large online campaign, including a petition that had over 17,000 signatures as of October 2006. At the end of October, Malloy resumed his show on a newly created progressive radio network, Nova M Radio.

=== Gloria Wise controversy ===
In July 2005, the Bronx News reported that the Gloria Wise Boys and Girls Club of Co-op City, a non-profit organization providing services for children and seniors in the Bronx, loaned US$480,000 (equivalent to $791,000 in 2025) to Progress Media, then owner of Air America Radio. It later turned out that there had been four separate transfers from Gloria Wise between October 2, 2003, and March 14, 2004, totalling US$875,000 (equivalent to $1,491,000 in 2025), and that no interest was to be paid on these loans.

Since then, the city has suspended further funding of the agency, and Boys and Girls Clubs of America has revoked the group's right to use their name, likeness or logo. At the time the funds were to have been transferred, Evan Cohen, the founder and first chairman of Air America and the former chairman of the now-defunct Progress Media, was also director of development for Gloria Wise.

In response to this report, Air America Radio's owners at the time, Piquant LLC, issued a press release stating Piquant had "no obligation to Progress Media's business activities", and Piquant, as previously agreed, would "fully compensate" the Gloria Wise Boys & Girls Club. While Gloria Wise remains under investigation, Air America has since repaid the loan. On May 28, 2008, Cohen was arrested at Guam International Airport on a warrant from the State of Hawaii. He was indicted in Hawaii for money laundering and stealing over US$60,000 (equivalent to $90,000 in 2025) from a Honolulu-based landscaping company.

=== Air America, The Playbook ===
Air America, the Playbook, a 300 plus page collection of essays, transcripts, and interviews by mostly Air America personalities was published shortly before the 2006 Congressional elections. It was on The New York Times Best Seller list for October 8, 2006.

=== Reorganizational bankruptcy and sale to Green Family Media ===
A week later, on October 13, 2006, Air America filed for bankruptcy protection under Chapter 11, at the U.S. Bankruptcy Court for the Southern District of New York. Air America continued broadcasting while the finances were worked out with the creditors. The company had US$4,331,265.30 in assets and US$20,266,056.23 in liabilities. Al Franken alone was owed US$360,749.98 and Rob Glaser, founder of RealNetworks, was owed the most at US$9.8 million. The filing had over 25 pages of creditors and showed that the company lost US$9.1 million in 2004, US$19.6 million in 2005 and an additional US$13.1 million by mid-October in 2006.

On January 29, 2007, Air America "signed a letter of intent to sell its business to SLG Radio LLC, an entity controlled by Stephen L. Green, the founder and chairman of SL Green Realty Corp, a company that controls 27 million ft^{2} (2.5 million m^{2}) of real estate with a market capitalization of US$12 billion". Air America CEO Scott Elberg said of Air America's sale, "We are extremely pleased to have reached this agreement with Mr. Green, which will solidify Air America's future." The sale was completed on March 6, 2007, to Green Family Media, a new company created by Stephen Green and his brother Mark Green.

=== Franken moves on to the U.S. Senate ===
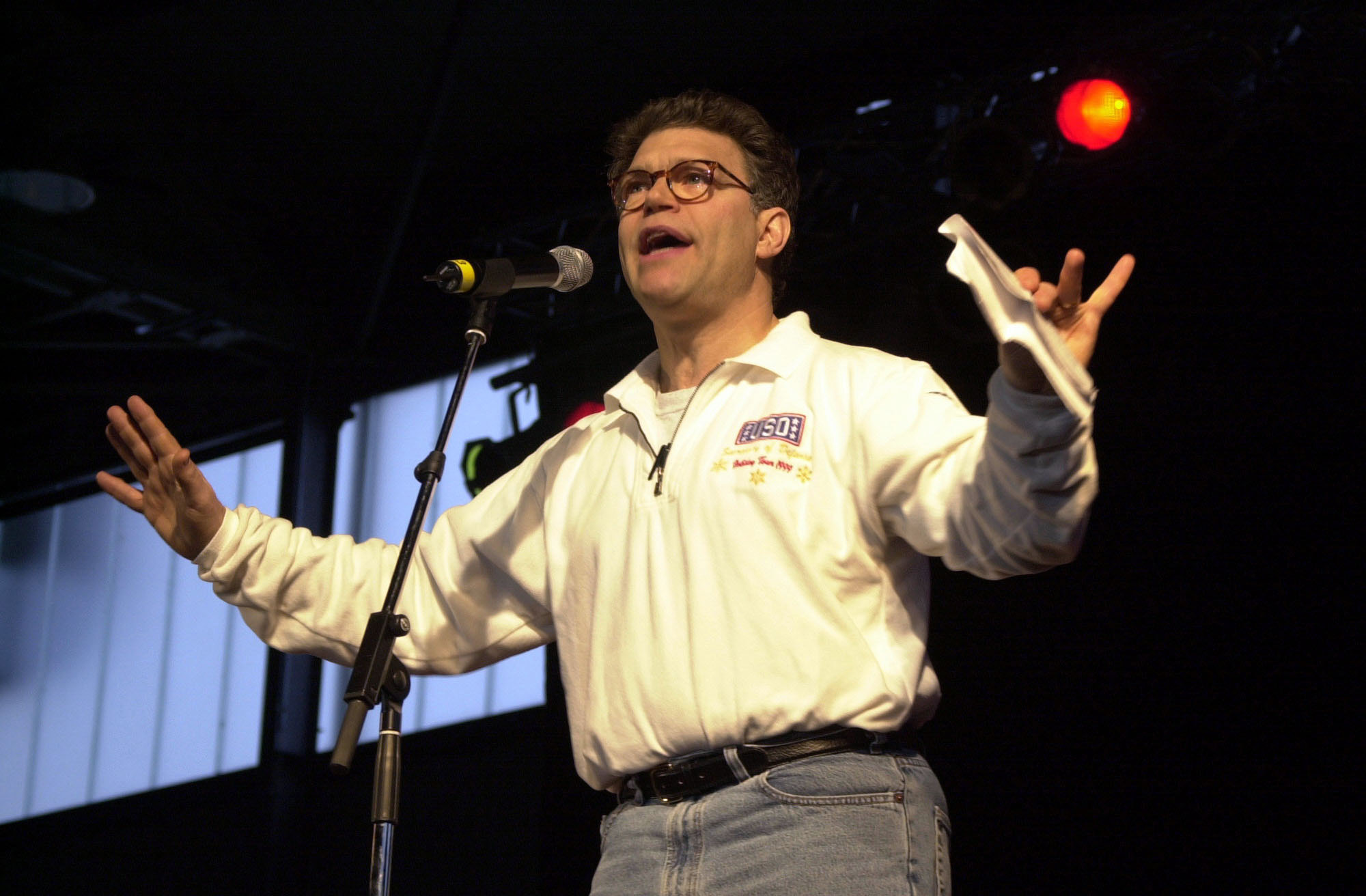
Al Franken, host of Air America Radio's former flagship program, The Al Franken Show.

During the bankruptcy, key on-air personality Al Franken decided that he was going to give up his show of three years to run for U.S. Senate. He made his official announcement during the last show. Thom Hartmann replaced him in March 2007. Franken won a close and highly contested election to become the 60th Senator in the Democratic Caucus for the 111th United States Congress.

=== Air America 2.0 ===
After the sale, major changes were quickly put into place. Stephen Green became the network's chairman, and Mark Green became president of Air America, with a hands-on role. Former chief executive Scott Elberg remained as chief operating officer. Mark Green announced on Thursday, April 25, 2007, that Westwood One would take over the handling of Air America's ad sales from Jones Radio Networks. In addition, a new lineup was unveiled for the radio network. The top four weekday shows were kept, but extensive changes were made to the rest of the lineup. Green also announced a redesign for the network's website, in addition to a new logo.

On March 14, 2007, the new owners of Air America announced the hiring of longtime radio veteran David Bernstein to be the new vice president of programming. Prior to joining Air America, he was best known as the program director at New York radio station WOR from 1995 to 2002. In an interview with the New York Daily News, Bernstein explained his vision of Air America's future as "I don't see our purpose as 'answering' conservative radio or Rush Limbaugh. There's no clear majority in this country today. We want to talk to everyone and help everyone make the right choice." On November 15, 2007, industry news site Radio Online reported that Bernstein was exiting Air America.

After being suspended by Air America management for derogatory remarks toward Geraldine Ferraro and Hillary Clinton while off the air, Randi Rhodes quit the network on April 9, 2008, citing a contract dispute. She was one of Air America's more popular hosts, with a listener base of 1.5 million unique listeners per week built up over 4 years. Rhodes moved to Nova M Radio the next week, and was syndicated by Premiere Radio Networks after Nova M went bankrupt.

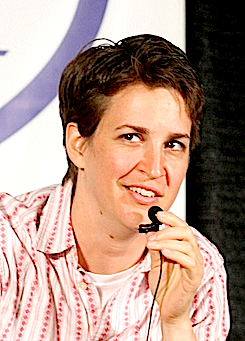
Maddow hosting KPTK's "Changing the Media, Changing America" event in Seattle (June 2006)

Meanwhile, longtime host Rachel Maddow was finding her way into television. As a guest host and as a panelist, she appeared on MSNBC. She started her own show on the network in September 2008, in prime time after Keith Olbermann and Chris Matthews. Her radio show became more of a replay of her television show, and ultimately her radio program became a one-hour show in the mornings.

Maddow didn't want to completely depart from radio. She commented "My relationship with the radio audience is valuable and important. I also believe in what Air America is doing."

Thom Hartmann moved his show to the Dial Global radio network on March 1, 2009. Hartmann had been the flagship program on AAR for a year. Montel Williams hosted the new flagship program in Lionel's previous spot, and Lionel moved his show to the 12 p.m.–3 p.m. ET slot.

=== Sale and closure ===
Stephen Green sold Air America Radio in 2009 to Charles Kireker. Mark Green continued as president.

On January 21, 2010, Air America announced that it would immediately cease programming and file for Chapter 7 bankruptcy, giving the following explanation on their website:

The very difficult economic environment has had a significant impact on Air America's business. This past year has seen a "perfect storm" in the media industry generally. National and local advertising revenues have fallen drastically, causing many media companies nationwide to fold or seek bankruptcy protection. From large to small, recent bankruptcies like Citadel Broadcasting and closures like that of the industry's long-time trade publication Radio & Records have signaled that these are very difficult and rapidly changing times.

Others involved with Air America or progressive talk radio cite other reasons as the cause of the network's demise. Thom Hartmann left Air America due in part to his dissatisfaction with the network's merry-go-round management. "We've been far more successful since we left," Mr. Hartmann said in an interview after the closure. Several other former employees have made similar complaints, specifically that the management of Air America lacked the necessary broadcasting business expertise.

Progressive commentator Alan Colmes cited problems with the network's constituent stations:

Because conservatives were so entrenched on heritage stations, the progressives on Air America were relegated to smaller, less powerful, under-performing signals that could not compete with their more established counterparts; certainly not without lots of promotion and time to develop, both of which were denied in most cases.

At some point after the network's closure in 2010, Newsweb Corporation (the owner of Chicago's WCPT AM band radio station) gained ownership of the network's name.

== Ratings ==
In Arbitron's Spring 2008 ratings book, stations carrying a majority AAR programming and in markets reporting every quarter averaged a 1.3 share. The highest rated Air America affiliates were KPOJ in Portland, Oregon (3.7 share), WXXM in Madison, Wisconsin (3.5), and KABQ in Albuquerque, New Mexico (2.6). The lowest rated affiliates were WDTW and WLBY in Detroit, Michigan (unmeasurable), WOIC in Columbia, South Carolina (0.4), WTKG in Grand Rapids, Michigan (0.5), and flagship station WWRL in New York City (0.5).

WXXM in Madison had announced in November 2006 that it would switch to all sports programming by the end of the year. Following backlash from the station's listeners and syndicated hosts, Clear Channel in Madison later backtracked, deciding to leave the progressive talk format on the station.

== Affiliates ==
As of October 2008, Air America programming was carried on 66 terrestrial broadcast stations, an increase of 10 percent over the previous six months. Thirty-two of these stations broadcast a majority AAR programming. During the first 4½ years of the network's existence, Air America has lost 63 affiliates to other programming or formats. Air America counts any station that carries any of their programming as an affiliate, similar to radio networks such as ESPN Radio. Stations owned by Clear Channel Communications had been early backers of the network, and the company used the network as programming for some of its smaller AM stations. However, in the past few years, the network has been moving instead toward replacing Air America on those stations with Fox Sports Radio (a Clear Channel product), as WCKY Cincinnati, KLSD San Diego and WINZ Miami were all once Air America affiliates but are now affiliated with Fox Sports. (There have been a few notable exceptions that have remained with Air America, such as WXXM in Madison, Wisconsin, which kept Air America after listener protests, and KKGN in San Francisco, where the Fox Sports affiliation is held by another station and there are fewer programming options due to significant competition).

SiriusXM Satellite Radio channel "Sirius XM Progress" currently broadcasts programs from two former Air Americans: Mike Malloy and Thom Hartmann.

== See also ==
- Democracy Now!
- Democracy Radio
- Jones Radio Networks
- The Majority Report with Sam Seder, podcast successor to the original Majority Report on Air America
- Nova M Radio
- Progressive talk radio
- Ring of Fire (radio program)
- Talk radio
