= KCLU (AM) =

Satellite of KCLU-FM, Thousand Oaks
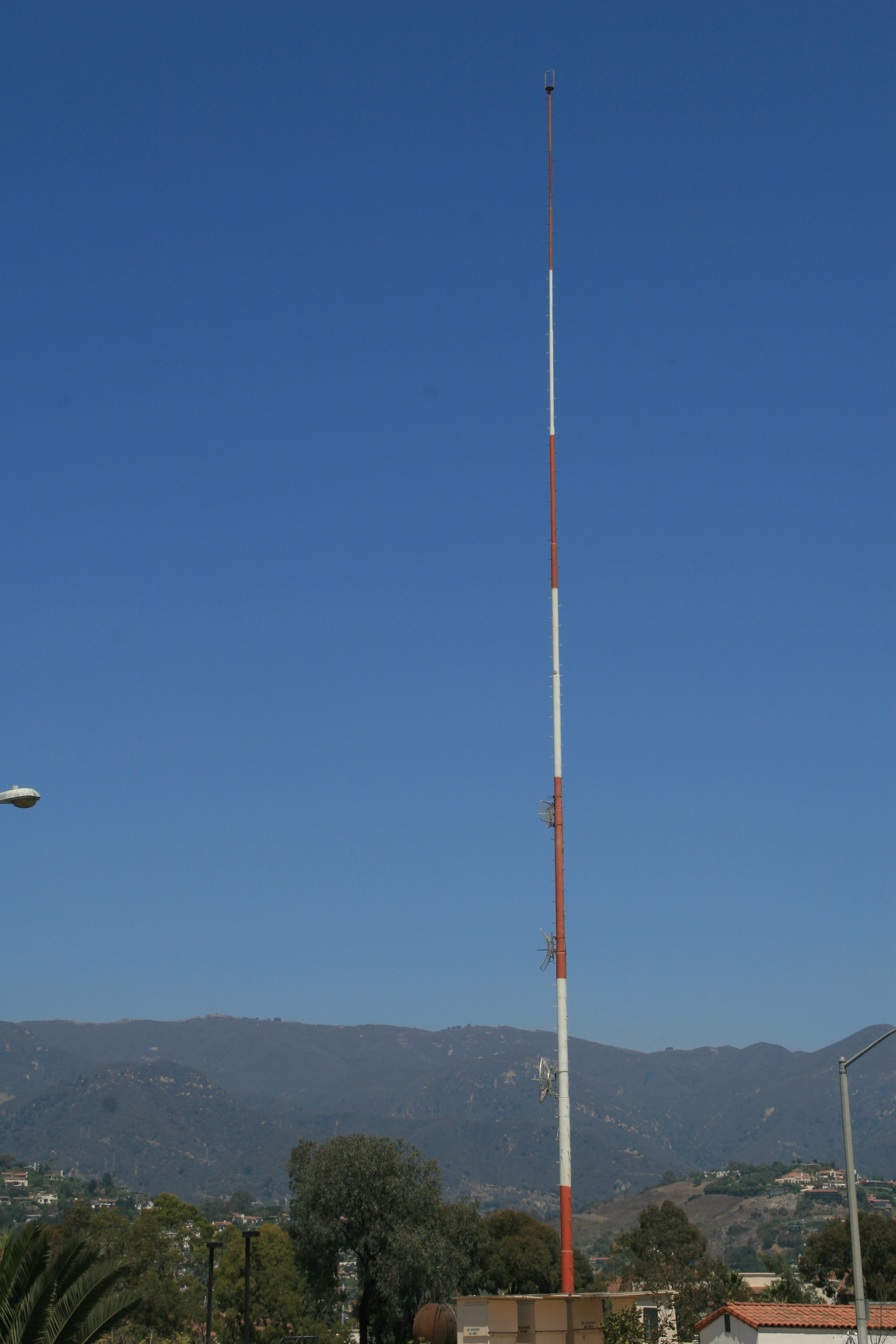
- Santa Barbara, California; United States
- Broadcast area: Santa Barbara, California
- Frequency: 1340 kHz
- Branding: KCLU Santa Barbara

Programming
- Format: Public radio
- Affiliations: NPR

Ownership
- Owner: California Lutheran University
- Sister stations: KCLM, KCLU-FM, KSYV

History
- First air date: 1946
- Former call signs: KIST (1946–1998, 2000–2003, 2005–2008); KLDZ (1998); KXXT (1998–2000); KTLK (2003–2005))
- Call sign meaning: California Lutheran University

Technical information
- Licensing authority: FCC
- Facility ID: 10327
- Class: C
- Power: 740 watts (day); 700 watts (night)
- Transmitter coordinates: 34°25′8″N 119°41′13.5″W
- Translator: 102.3 K272DT (Santa Barbara)

Links
- Public license information: Public file; LMS
- Webcast: Listen live
- Website: kclu.org

KCLU (1340 AM) is a non-commercial radio station licensed to Santa Barbara, California, United States. The station airs a public radio format simulcasting NPR member station KCLU-FM in Thousand Oaks. KCLU is rebroadcast on translator station K272DT (102.3 FM) in Santa Barbara. The two stations form part of a five-signal network owned by California Lutheran University.

== History ==
The station first signed on in 1946 as KIST under the ownership of Harry C. Butcher. It was affiliated with the NBC Radio Network. In 1958, Butcher sold KIST to Western States Radio — a group consisting of A.R. Ellman, A.C. Morici, and station manager Karl A. Rembe — for $197,500.

For many years, especially in the 1960s and 1970s, KIST was a premier top 40 music station. Under the ownership of Joseph Patterson "Patt" Wardlaw, Jr., who purchased Western States Radio in 1960, KIST not only played the popular music of the day but also claimed one of the finest news broadcasting teams in the Santa Barbara area. The station won awards from the Southern California Broadcasters Association for its coverage of the Sycamore Fire in 1977. Each on-air disc jockey and many of the support staff carried two-way mobile radios in their vehicles; these enabled instant on-scene news reporting. The KIST staff from this era included program director Hal Bates, music director Dick Williams (since deceased), news director Patrick C. Riley, and chief engineer Doug Allan. On-air personalities included morning drive host Baron Ron Herron, reporter Ed Foley, music director, Johnny Fairchild, and disc jockeys, Tommy Moller (On the Go with the Tommy Moller show), Scotty Johnson, Tom Payne, Jack Kinney, Mike Hennie, Jim Cordes (aka Jim Evans), Frank Catalano, and Steve Dezormo (since deceased). Station bumper stickers of the time read, "Get KIST 1340!"

Beginning in 1983–84, KIST broadcasts in C-QUAM AM Stereo. By the early 1990s, KIST had changed its format to oldies. In March 1993, RSB Communications sold KIST and KMGQ to Channel Islands Broadcasting for $850,000. Three years later, in September 1996, Channel Islands Broadcasting sold the combo to Engles Enterprises for $3.5 million.

In September 1997, Engels sold KIST to Jacor Communications for $850,000; Jacor subsequently was absorbed by Clear Channel Communications. The new owner changed the station's call letters to KLDZ. Soon it became all-sports outlet KXXT branded "XTRA Sports 1340". One of the station's on-air hosts was Jim Rome, a graduate of the University of California, Santa Barbara. On March 29, 2000, the call sign was changed back to KIST.

On August 8, 2003, the call sign was again changed, this time to KTLK. This change accompanied a format flip to progressive talk radio, part of a national rollout of the format by Clear Channel. Those call letters remained in place until February 3, 2005, when they were changed back to KIST for a third time.

On January 11, 2007, Clear Channel sold all of its radio stations in Santa Barbara, including KIST, to Rincon Broadcasting, headed by John Hearne, for $17.3 million. The new owner immediately donated KIST to the Santa Barbara Community Broadcasting Company.

On June 19, 2008, R & R Radio, LLC announced it had sold KIST to California Lutheran University for $1.44 million. On October 7, the university, owner of NPR member station KCLU-FM, converted the station to non-commercial educational status and changed its call letters to KCLU. On October 28, Rincon Broadcasting picked up the KIST call and format on KBKO (1490 AM).

In December 2021, KCLU's 198-foot red-and-white transmitting tower, which it shares with KOSJ and KZSB, and had long been slightly bent, was shortened to 128 feet and topped with four 12-foot "whiskers" in a horizontal X shape, to give the tower extra electrical length. It was also painted dark green to better blend with its surroundings. Because the shortened tower is a less efficient radiator, KCLU compensated by raising its power from 650 watts on the original tower to 740 watts in the daytime and 700 watts at night on the new configuration.
