= List of Bernie Sanders 2016 presidential campaign endorsements =

Bernie Sanders for President
- Campaign: 2016 United States presidential election
- Candidate: Bernie Sanders: U.S. Senator from Vermont (2007–present)
- Affiliation: Democratic Party (previously served as an independent in Senate)
- Status: Announced: April 30, 2015; Formal launch: May 26, 2015; Endorsed Hillary Clinton: July 12, 2016; Lost nomination: July 26, 2016
- Headquarters: 131 Church Street, Suite 300; Burlington, Vermont
- Key people: Jeff Weaver (campaign manager); Tad Devine (senior campaign strategist); Symone D. Sanders (press secretary)
- Receipts: US$180,630,234.25 (2016-3-31)
- Slogans: A Future To Believe In; Not me. Us.; A Political Revolution Is Coming; Not For Sale; Enough Is Enough; Feel the Bern
- Chant

Website
- berniesanders.com

This is a list of notable individuals and organizations who voiced their endorsement of Bernie Sanders as the Democratic Party's presidential nominee for the 2016 U.S. presidential election.

== Primary campaign endorsements ==
=== Former U.S. cabinet members and cabinet-level officials ===
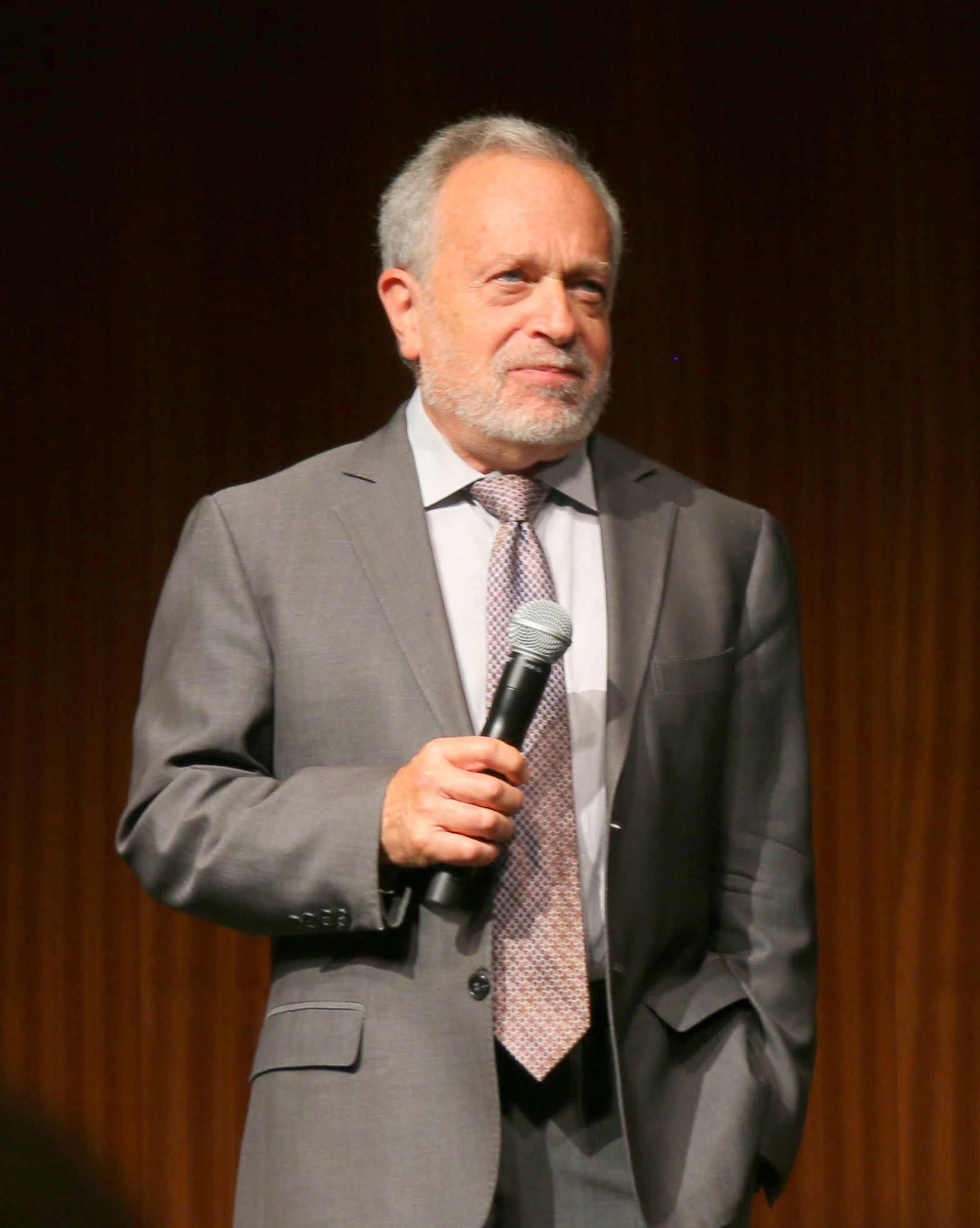
Robert Reich

- Robert Reich, 22nd secretary of labor (1993–1997)

=== U.S. senators ===
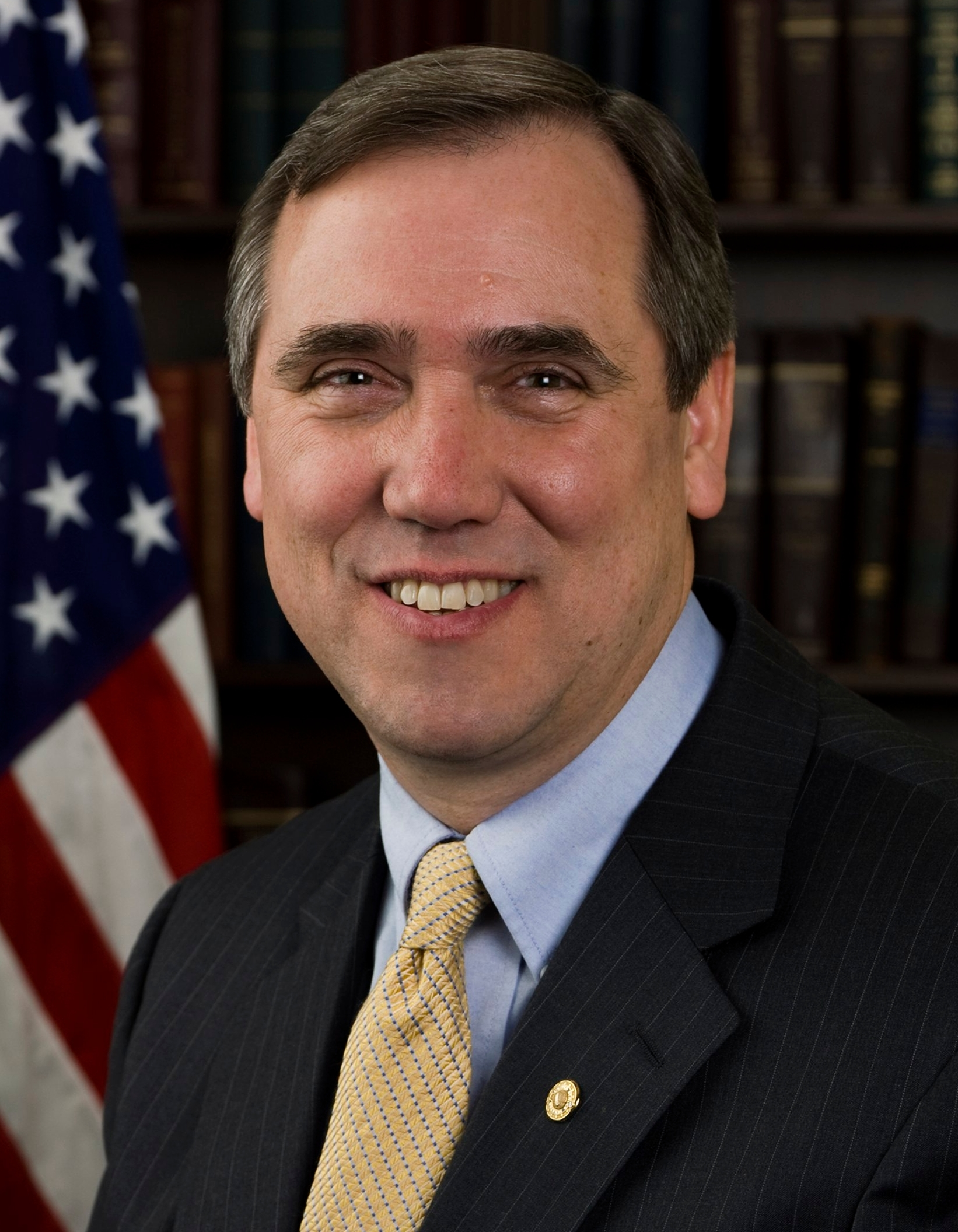
Jeff Merkley

- Jeff Merkley, OR

=== Former U.S. senators ===
- Mike Gravel, AK (1969–1981)
- Paul G. Kirk, MA (2009–2010)
- Don Riegle, MI (1976–1995)

=== U.S. representatives ===
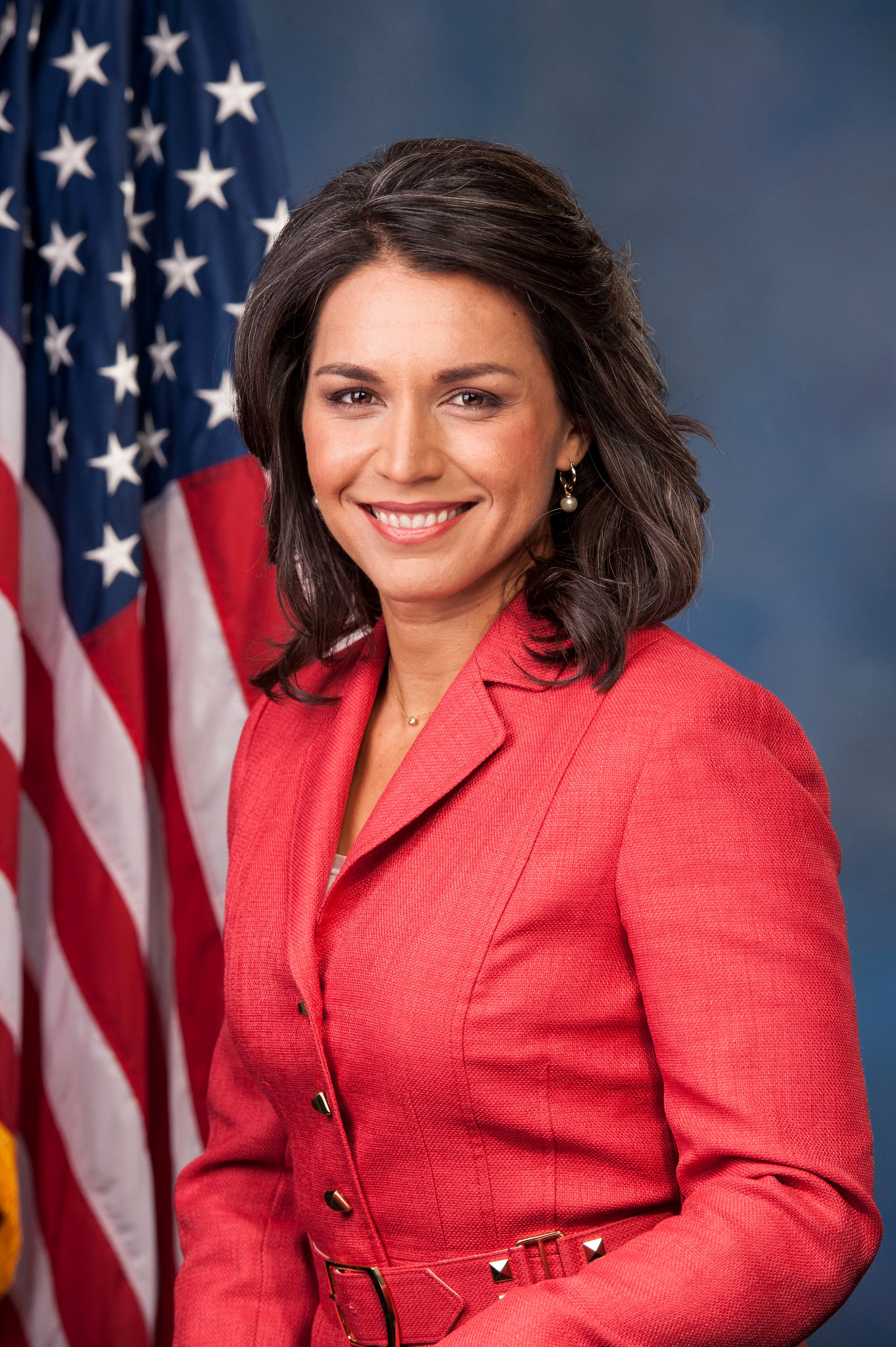
Tulsi Gabbard

- Keith Ellison, MN
- Tulsi Gabbard, HI
- Alan Grayson, FL
- Raúl Grijalva, AZ
- Marcy Kaptur, OH
- Dan Lipinski, IL
- Rick Nolan, MN
- Collin Peterson, MN
- Peter Welch, VT

=== Former U.S. representatives ===
- Brad Miller, NC (2003–2013)

=== Former state and territorial governors ===
- Aníbal Acevedo Vilá, 9th governor of Puerto Rico (2005–2009)
- John Kitzhaber, governor of Oregon (1995–2003; 2011–2015)
- Jesse Ventura, 38th governor of Minnesota (1999–2003)

=== State executive officials ===
- Jim Condos, 38th secretary of state of Vermont
- Matthew Dunlap, 47th & 49th secretary of state of Maine
- Doug Hoffer, 30th Vermont auditor of accounts

=== Former state executive officials ===
- Dudley Dudley, New Hampshire Executive Council member (1977–1985)
- Jim Hightower, 8th Texas agriculture commissioner (1983–1991)
- Barbara Lawton, 43rd lieutenant governor of Wisconsin (2003–2011)
- Vel Phillips, 29th secretary of state of Wisconsin (1979–1983)
- John Shea, New Hampshire Executive Council member (2006–2010)

=== State legislators ===
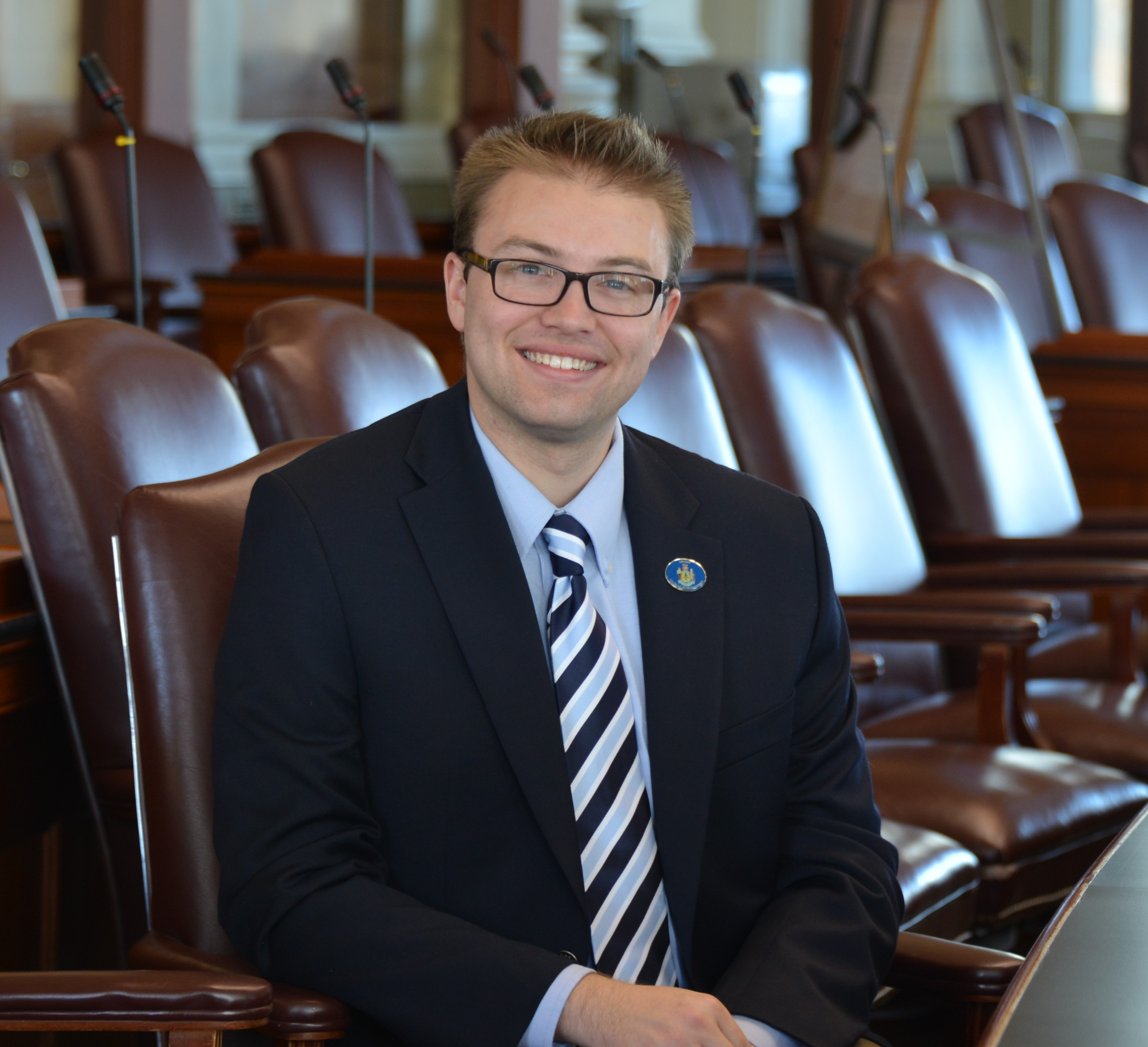
Justin Chenette

Kaniela Ing

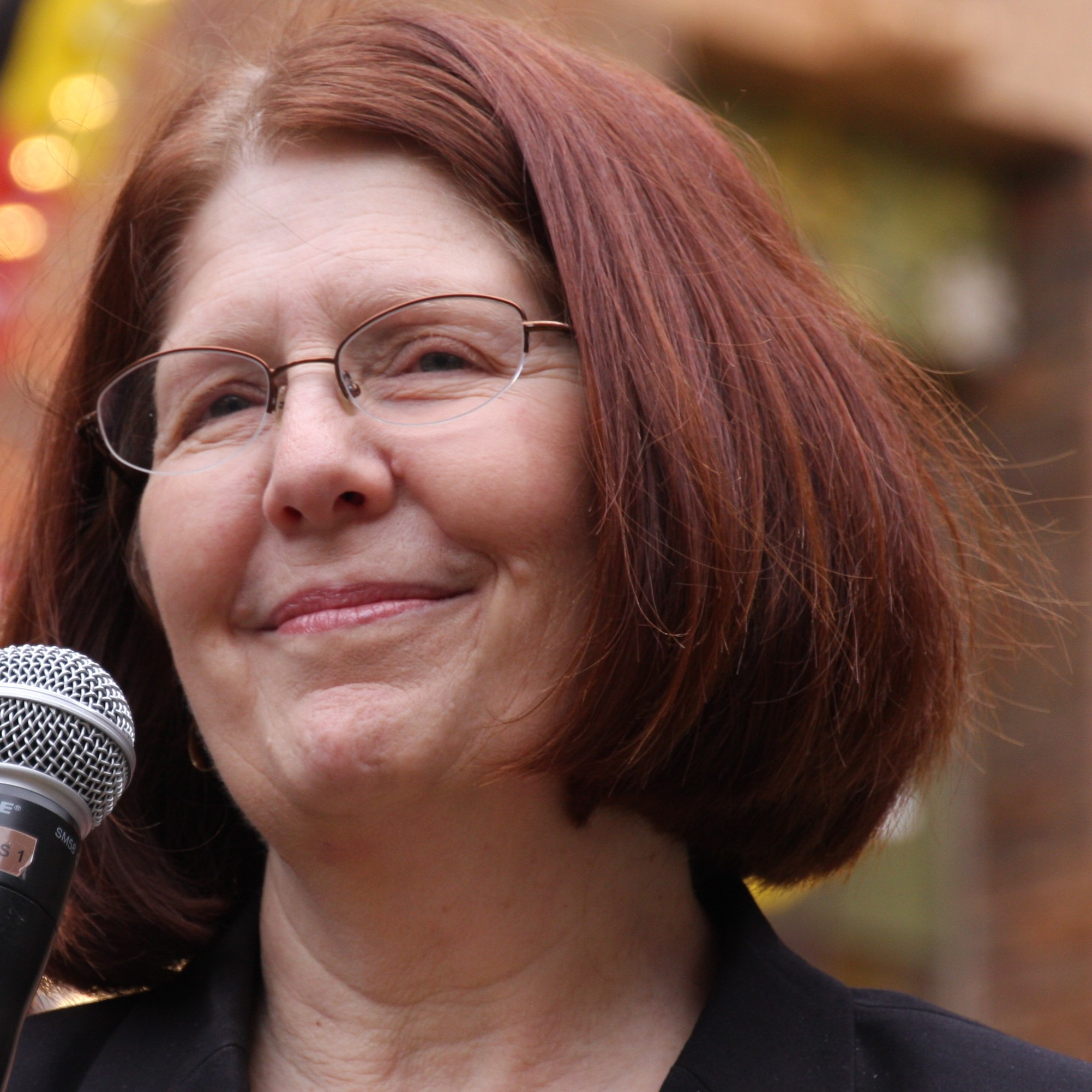
Tina Liebling

James Sanders, Jr.

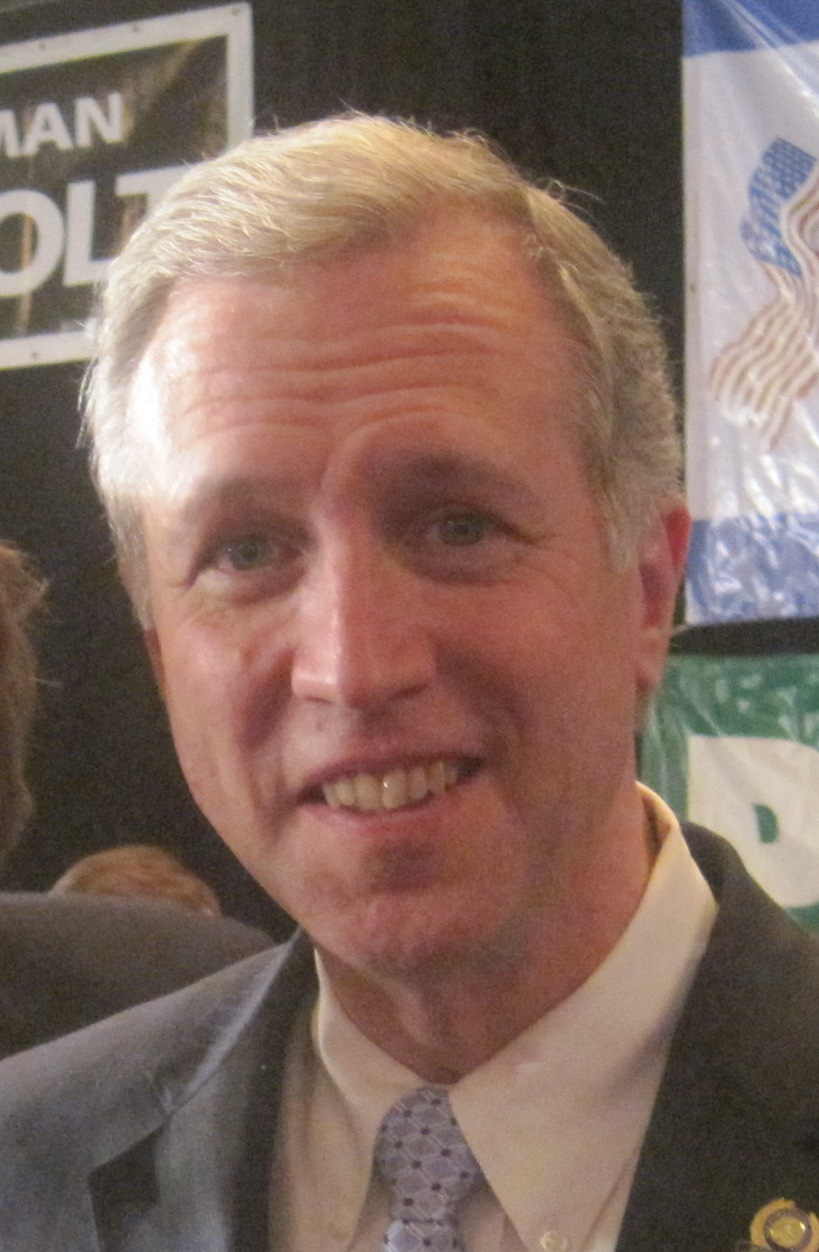
John Wisniewski

- Terry Alexander, SC rep.
- Susan Allen, MN rep.
- Tom Anzelc, MN rep.
- Tim Ashe, VT sen. (VPP)
- Justin Bamberg, SC rep.
- Roberta Beavers, ME rep.
- Brian Blake, WA rep.
- Lydia Blume, ME rep.
- David Bly, MN rep.
- Jonathan Brostoff, WI rep.
- James J. Campbell, ME rep. (Ind.)
- Mark Cardenas, AZ rep.
- Ralph Chapman, ME rep.
- Maralyn Chase, WA Sen.
- Justin Chenette, ME rep.
- Ben Chipman, ME rep.
- Jackie Cilley, NH rep.
- Karen Clark, MN rep.
- Robert Cushing, NH rep.
- Andrea Dalessandro, AZ sen.
- Mark Dion, ME rep.
- Michelle Dunphy, ME rep.
- Jamie Eldridge, MA sen.
- Jeffrey Evangelos, ME rep. (Ind.)
- Richard Farnsworth, ME rep.
- Jessyn Farrell, WA rep.
- Gail Finney, KS rep.
- La Shawn K. Ford, IL rep.
- Vincent Fort, GA sen.
- Noel Frame, WA rep.
- Steve Gallardo, AZ sen.
- Eric Genrich, WI Ass.
- Carmine Gentile, MA rep.
- Wendell Gilliard, SC rep.
- Cheryl Glenn, MD del.
- Adam Goode, ME rep.
- Roger Goodman, WA rep.
- Geoffrey Gratwick, ME sen.
- Ana Sol Gutierrez, MD del.
- Will Guzzardi, IL rep.
- Sandy Haas, VT rep. (VPP)
- Denise Harlow, ME rep.
- Bob Hasegawa, WA sen.
- Arthur L. Haywood III, PA Sen.
- Jack Hennessy, CT rep.
- Gary Holder-Winfield, CT sen.
- Frank Hornstein, MN rep.
- Kaniela Ing, HI rep.
- Troy Jackson, ME sen.
- Pramila Jayapal, WA sen.
- Pat Jehlen, MA sen.
- Bert Johnson, MI sen.
- Mary Keefe, MA rep.
- John Kefalas, CO sen.
- Jeff Kessler, WV sen.
- Stephen Kulik, MA rep.
- Tina Liebling, MN rep.
- Carlos Mariani, MN rep.
- Paul Mark, MA rep.
- Marisa Márquez, TX rep.
- John Marty, MN sen.
- Jeff McCabe, ME House maj. leader
- Juan Mendez, AZ rep.
- Michael Merrifield, CO sen.
- David Miramant, ME sen.
- Kim Monaghan-Derrig, ME rep.
- Michael Moran, MA rep.
- Luis Moscoso, WA rep.
- Joseph Neal, SC rep.
- Rob Nosse, OR rep.
- Jerry Ortiz y Pino, NM sen.
- John Patrick, ME sen.
- Chris Pearson, VT rep. (VPP)
- Charles F. Pelkey, WY rep.
- Christine Pellegrino, NY rep.
- Bill Perkins, NY sen.
- Paul Pinsky, MD sen.
- Anthony Pollina, VT sen. (VPP)
- Robyn Porter, CT rep.
- Christine Powers, ME rep.
- Martín Quezada, AZ sen.
- J. Aaron Regunberg, RI rep.
- Marcus Riccelli, WA rep.
- Shane Robinson, MD del.
- Russell Ruderman, HI sen.
- Diane Russell, ME rep.
- Deane Rykerson, ME rep.
- Joseph Salazar, CO rep.
- James Sanders Jr., NY sen.
- Robert Saucier, ME rep.
- David Sawyer, WA rep.
- Tick Segerblom, NV sen.
- Mike Sells, WA rep.
- Luis R. Sepúlveda, NY ass.
- David Sharpe, VT rep.
- James Sheehan, RI sen.
- Amy Sheldon, VT rep.
- Jonathan Singer, CO rep.
- Michael J. Skindell, OH sen.
- Timothy Smith, NH rep.
- Jimmy Tarlau, MD del.
- Fred Thiele, NY ass.
- Peter Tercyak, CT rep.
- Sharon Tomiko Santos, WA rep.
- Edwin Vargas, CT rep.
- Robert Q. Williams, SC rep.
- John Wisniewski, NJ ass.
- Dan Wolf, MA sen.
- Teo Žagar, VT rep.
- David Zuckerman, VT sen. (VPP)

=== Former state legislators ===
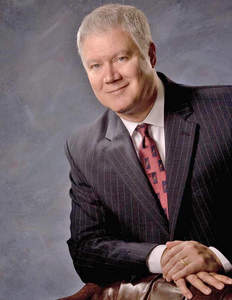
John G. Richardson

- Daryl Beall, IA sen. (2003–2015)
- Gloria Bromell Tinubu, GA rep. (2011)
- Bruce Bryant, ME sen. (2002–2010)
- Lon Burnam, TX rep. (1997–2015)
- Terrance Carroll, 34th CO House speaker (2009–2011)
- Gil Cedillo, CA sen. (2002–2010)
- Amanda Curtis, MT rep. (2013–2015)
- Thomas Duane, NY sen. (1999–2012)
- Matt Dunne, VT sen. (2002–2006)
- Robert W. Duplessie, ME rep. (1998–2006)
- David Dutremble, ME sen. (2012–2016)
- Ed Fallon, IA rep. (1993–2016)
- Frances Farenthold, TX rep. (1969–1973)
- Tom Fiegen, IA rep. (2000–2003)
- Lucy Flores, NV ass. (2011–2015)
- Michael Foley, OH rep. (2006–2014)
- Michael Futrell, VA del. (2014–2016)
- Domingo García, TX rep. (1996–2002)
- Rod Halvorson, IA sen. (1995–1999) and Rep. (1979–1995)
- Becky Lourey, MN sen. (1991–2007)
- Dave McTeague OR rep. (1985–1995)
- Heather Mizeur MD del. (2007–2015)
- Matt Patrick, MA rep. (2001–2011)
- Paul N. Poirier, VT rep. (1980–1989)
- C. J. Prentiss, OH sen. (1999–2006)
- Charles R. Priest, ME rep. (2006–2014)
- John G. Richardson, 97th ME House speaker (2004–2006)
- Nina Turner, OH sen. (2008–2014)
- Tom Turnipseed, SC sen. (1976–1980)
- Hector Uribe, TX sen. (1981–1991)

=== Tribal leaders and officials ===
- Russell Begaye, 8th president of the Navajo Nation

=== Mayors ===
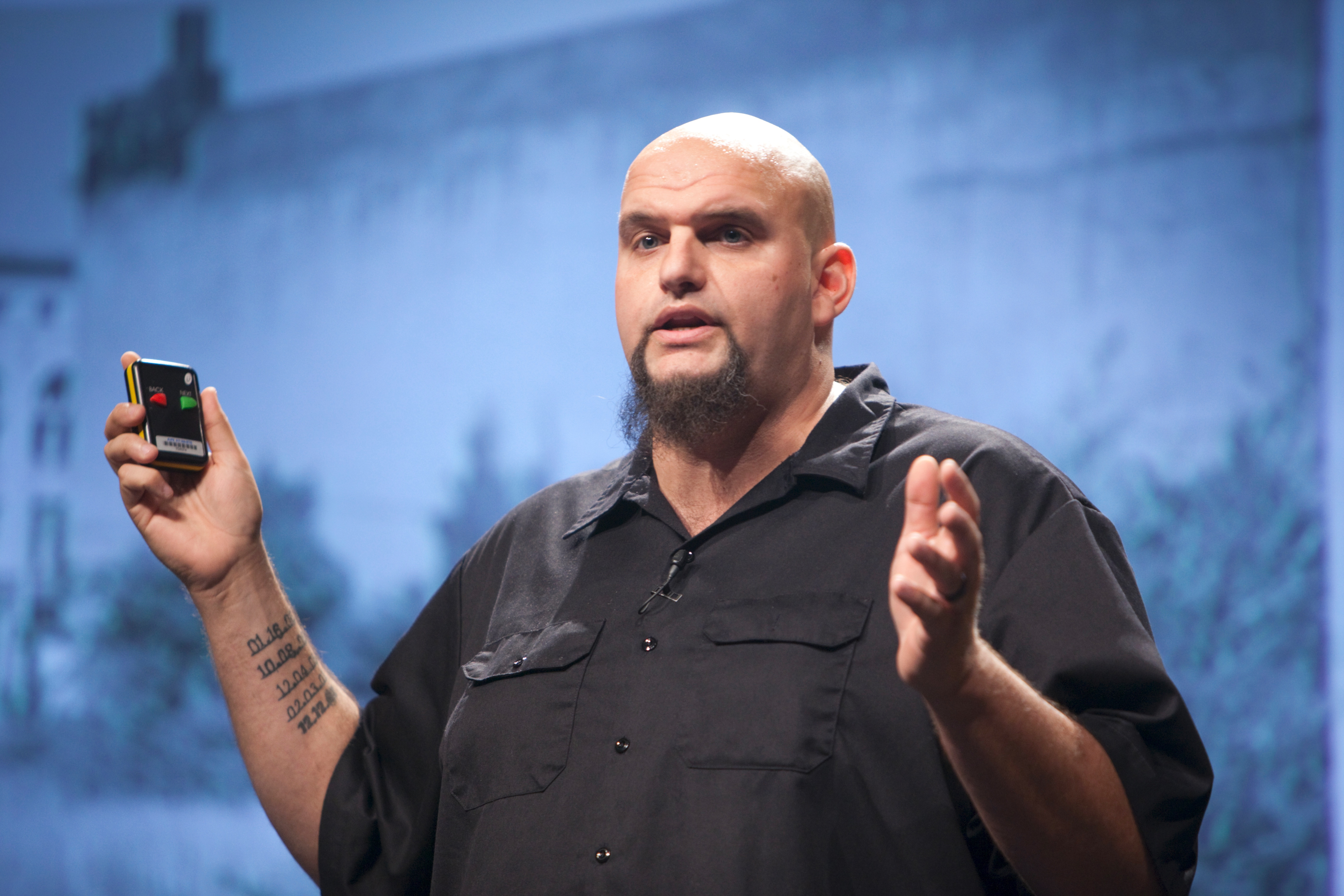
John Fetterman

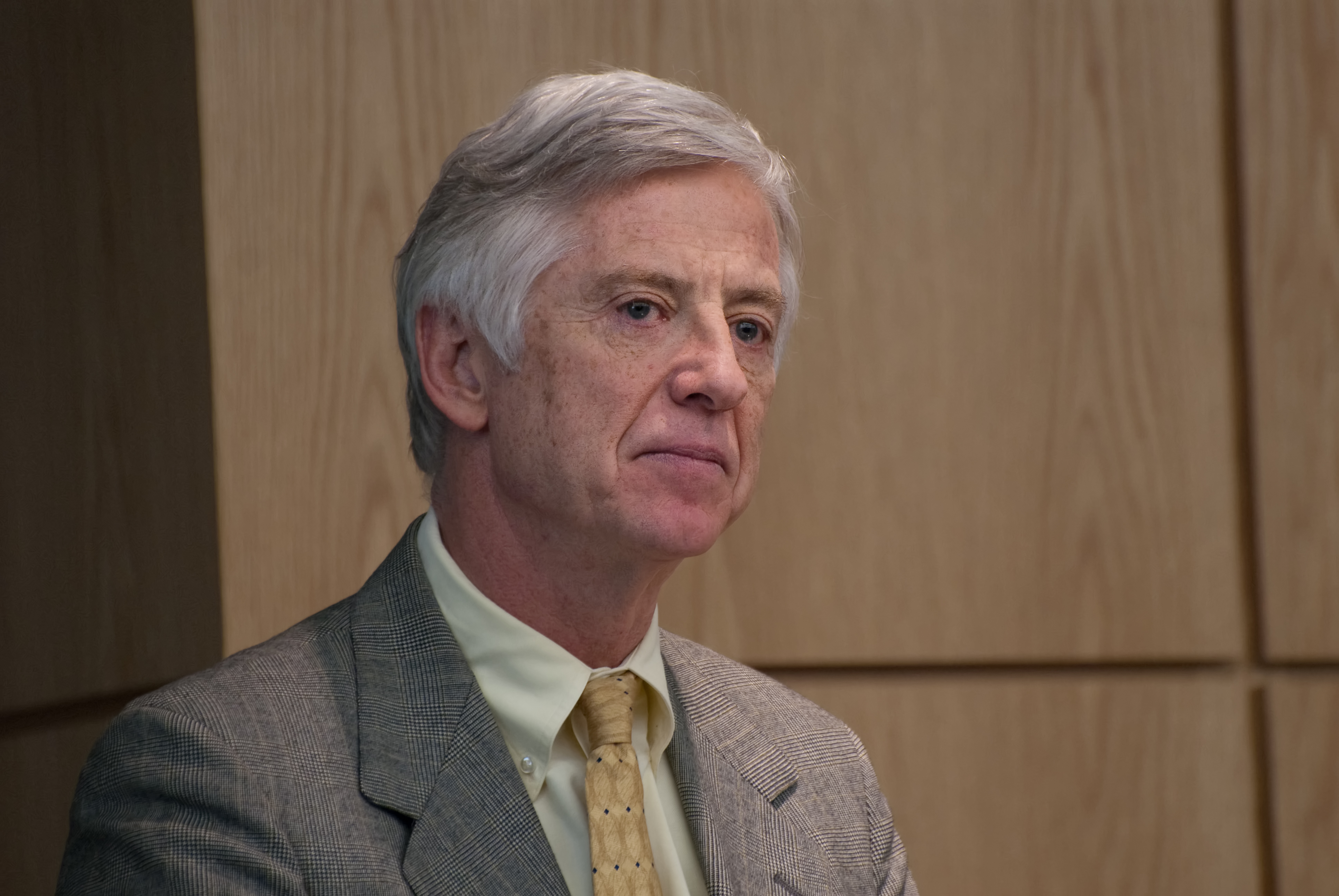
Rocky Anderson

- John Fetterman, mayor of Braddock, Pennsylvania
- James R. Fouts, mayor of Warren, Michigan (Independent)
- Bao Nguyen, mayor of Garden Grove, California
- Paul Soglin, mayor of Madison, Wisconsin

=== Former mayors ===
- Rocky Anderson, 33rd mayor of Salt Lake City, Utah (2000–2008) (Justice Party founder)
- Michael F. Brennan, 87th mayor of Portland, Maine (2011–2015)
- Daryl Justin Finizio, mayor of New London, Connecticut (2011–2015)
- Bill Gluba, 74th mayor of Davenport, Iowa (2008–2016)
- Harry Kim, 10th mayor of Hawaii County, Hawaii (2000–2008) (unaffiliated)
- Steve Marchand, mayor of Portsmouth, New Hampshire (2006-2008)
- Michael McGinn, 52nd mayor of Seattle, Washington (2010–2014)
- Gayle McLaughlin, mayor of Richmond, California (2007–2015) (Green Party)
- Gus Newport, 17th mayor of Berkeley, California (1979–1986)
- David Orr, 52nd mayor of Chicago, Illinois (1987)
- James Scheibel, 50th mayor of St. Paul, MN, 1990––1994
- Zareh Sinanyan, mayor of Glendale, California (2014–2015)

=== Municipal officials ===
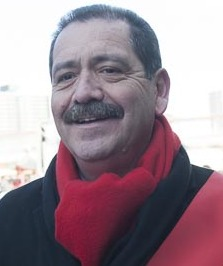
Jesus "Chuy" Garcia

- John Arena, Chicago City alderman
- Lisa Bender, Minneapolis City Council member
- Cecil Bothwell, Asheville city councilor
- Matthew Cubetus, member of the Sandwich Planning Board
- Rafael Espinal, New York City Council
- Jesus "Chuy" Garcia, Cook County, IL commissioner
- Jane Kim, San Francisco Board of Supervisors
- Carlos Ramirez-Rosa, Chicago City alderman
- Susie Sadlowski Garza, Chicago City alderwoman
- Steve Novick, Portland City Commissioner
- Kshama Sawant, Seattle city councillor (Socialist Alternative)
- Ritchie Torres, New York City Council
- Jumaane Williams, New York City Council

=== Former municipal officials ===
- Harry Britt, president of the San Francisco Board of Supervisors (1989–1990)
- Tim Hagan, Cuyahoga County, OH commissioner (1982–1998, 2004–2011)
- Richard Mell, Chicago City alderman (1975–2011)

=== Democratic National Committee members ===
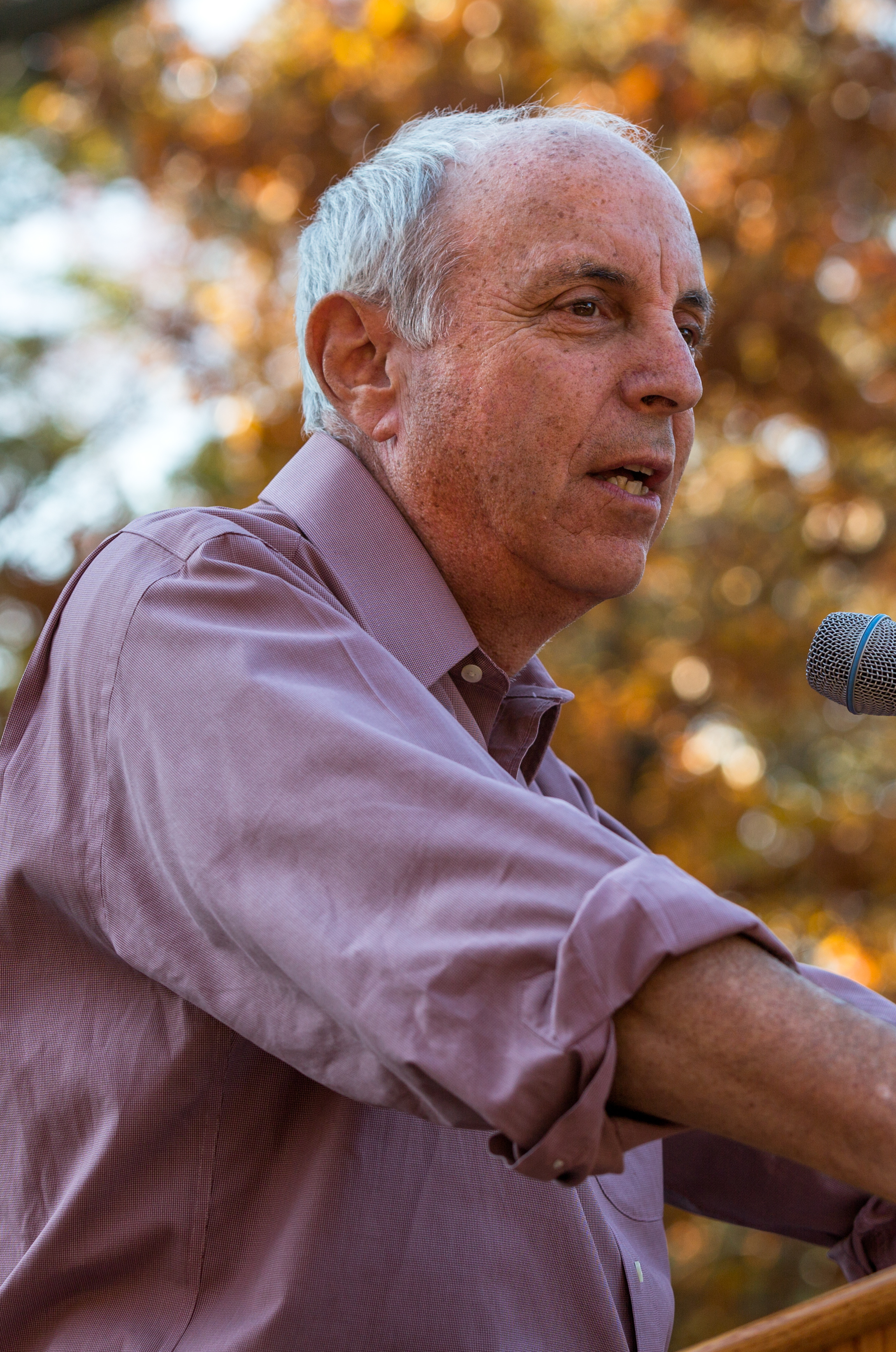
Larry Cohen

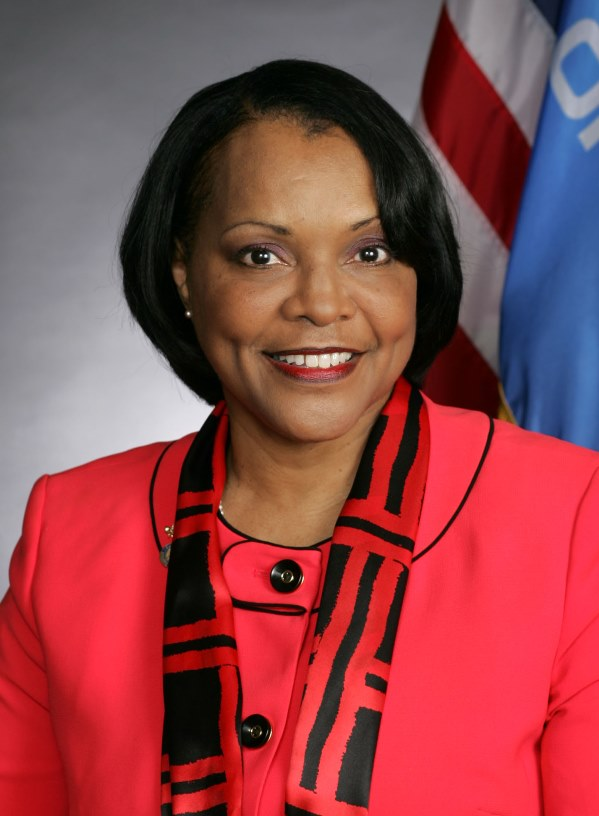
Constance N. Johnson

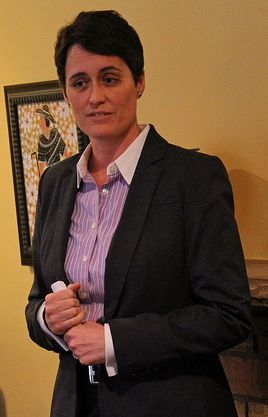
Heather Mizeur

- Erin Bilbray, NV
- David Bowen, WI Dem. Party vice chair
- Richard Cassidy, VT
- Martha Fuller Clark, NH
- Larry Cohen, DC/CWA
- Jim Condos, VT
- Peter Corroon, UT Dem. Party chair, former mayor of Salt Lake County
- Pat Cotham, NC
- Jean Lemire Dahlman, MT
- Bart Dame, HI
- Dottie Deans, VT
- Reni Erdos, NJ
- Pete Gertonson, ID
- Emmett Hansen, VI
- Elaine Harris, WV
- Wayne Holland, UT
- Theresa Hunkin, AS
- Troy Jackson, ME
- Nancy C. Jacobson, FL
- Tim Jerman, VT
- Connie Johnson, OK Dem. Party vice chair
- Bert Marley, ID Dem. Party chair
- Lupita Maurer, OR
- Heather Mizeur, MD
- Maureen Monahan, NE
- Larry Murakami, AK
- Chad Nodland, ND
- Danica Oparnica, AZ
- Johnnie Patton, MS
- Rev. Douglas N. Pyle, HI
- Jake Quinn, NC
- Chris Regan, WV
- Keelan Sanders, MS
- Ken Sherman, DA
- Gary Suwannarat, DA
- Larry Taylor, OR
- Tim Vanderveer, HI
- John Wisniewski, NJ
- Curtis Wylde, MO
- James Zogby, DC

==== Former Democratic National Committee members ====
- Severin Beliveau, former ME Dem. Party chair
- Dick Harpootlian, former South Carolina Democratic Party chair
- Paul G. Kirk, chairman of the DNC (1985–1989)
- Bill Press, former CA Dem. Party chair

=== International politicians ===
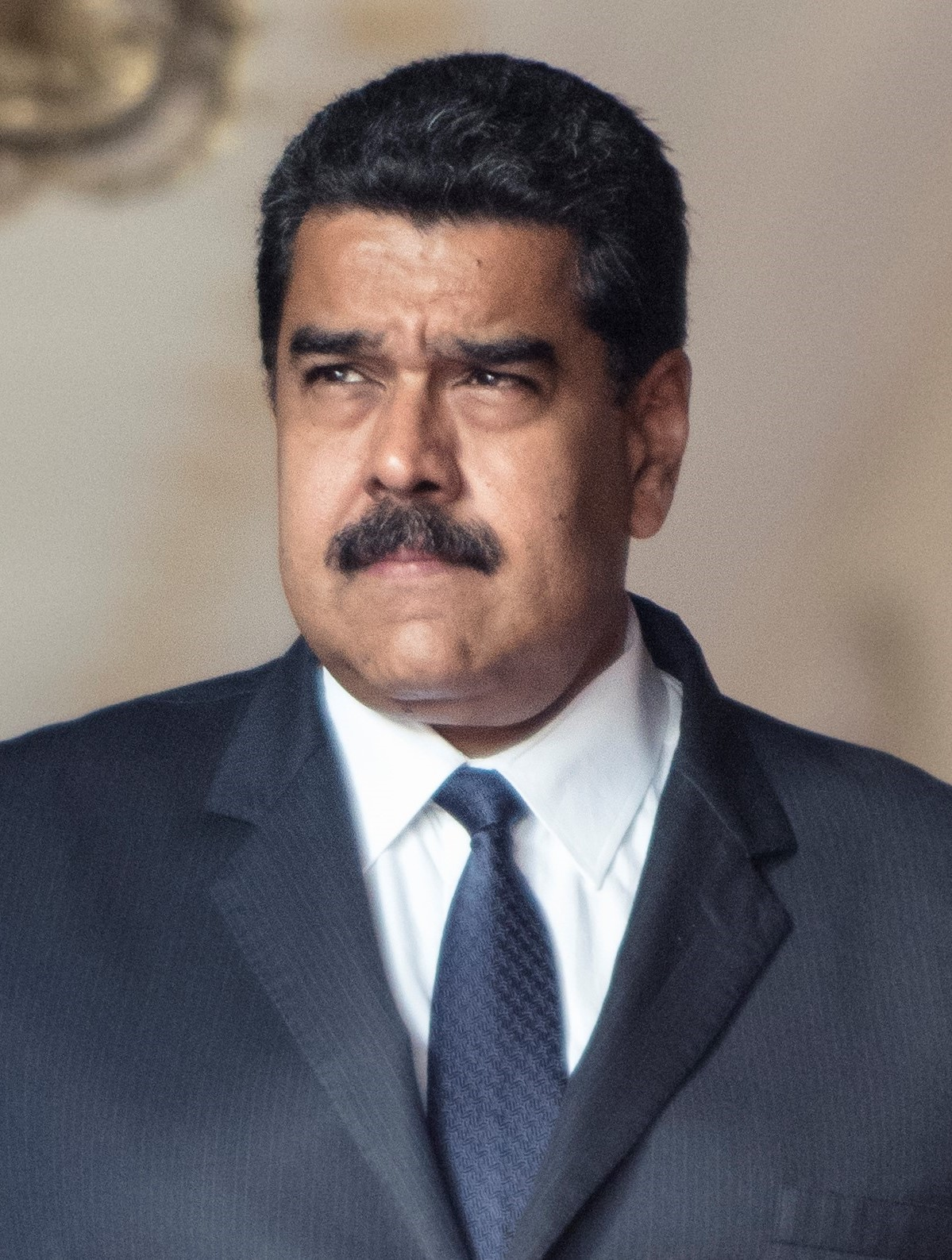
Nicolás Maduro of Venezuela

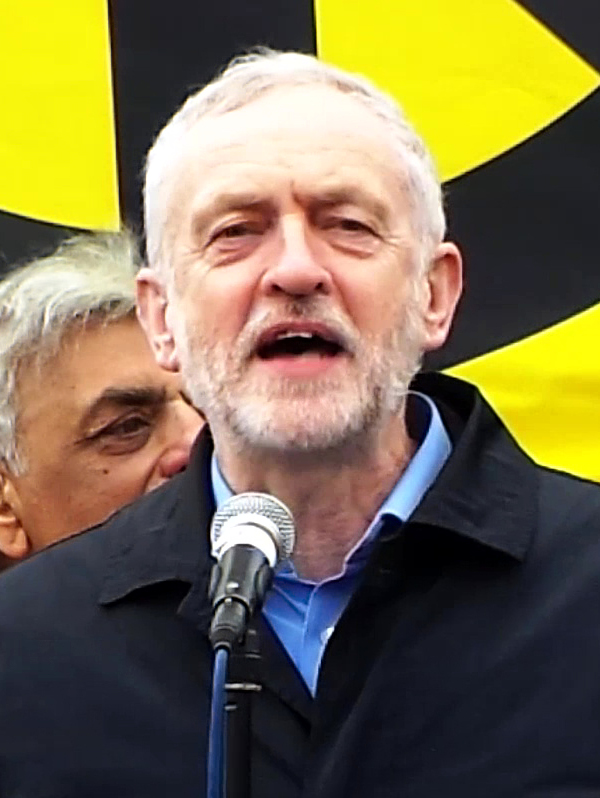
Jeremy Corbyn of the United Kingdom

==== Heads of state and government ====
- Nicolás Maduro, 65th president of Venezuela (United Socialist Party of Venezuela)
- Evo Morales, 80th president of Bolivia (Movement for Socialism)

==== National and supranational ministers and secretaries ====
- Ciro Gomes, former Brazilian minister of economy (1995) and former presidential candidate in 2018 Brazilian general election
- Yanis Varoufakis, former Greek minister of finance (2015) (Syriza)

==== Members of national and supranational parliaments ====
- Karin Andersen, Norwegian MP (Socialist Left Party)
- Niki Ashton, Canadian MP (New Democratic Party)
- Walden Bello, former Filipino MP (2007–2015) (Citizens' Action Party)
- Kirsti Bergstø, Norwegian MP (Socialist Left Party)
- Pippo Civati, Italian MP (leader of Possible)
- Jeremy Corbyn, British MP and leader of the Opposition (leader of the Labour Party)
- Sevim Dagdelen, German MP (The Left)
- Uffe Elbæk, Danish MP (leader of The Alternative)
- George Galloway, former British MP (1987–2010; 2012–2015) (leader of the Respect Party)
- Rasmus Hansson, Norwegian MP (Green Party)
- Patrick Harvie, Scottish MSP (Scottish Green Party)
- Heikki Holmås, Norwegian MP (Socialist Left Party)
- Andrej Hunko, German MP (The Left)
- Pablo Iglesias, Spanish MP (leader of Podemos)
- Birgitta Jónsdóttir, Icelandic MP (leader of the Pirate Party)
- Stefan Liebich, German MP (The Left)
- Audun Lysbakken, Norwegian MP (leader of the Socialist Left Party)
- Jean-Luc Mélenchon, French MEP (La France Insoumise)
- Niema Movassat, German MP (The Left)
- Paul Murphy, Irish TD (Anti-Austerity Alliance)
- Sverre Myrli, Norwegian MP (Labour Party)
- Abid Raja, Norwegian MP (Liberal Party)
- Freddy de Ruiter, Norwegian MP (Labour Party)
- András Schiffer, Hungarian MP (leader of Politics Can Be Different)
- Jonas Sjöstedt, Swedish MP (leader of the Left Party)
- Torstein Tvedt Solberg, Norwegian MP (Labour Party)
- Snorre Valen, Norwegian MP (Socialist Left Party)
- Nikolaj Villumsen, Danish MP (Red-Green Alliance)
- Sahra Wagenknecht, German MP (The Left)

==== Regional ministers, legislators, and party leaders ====
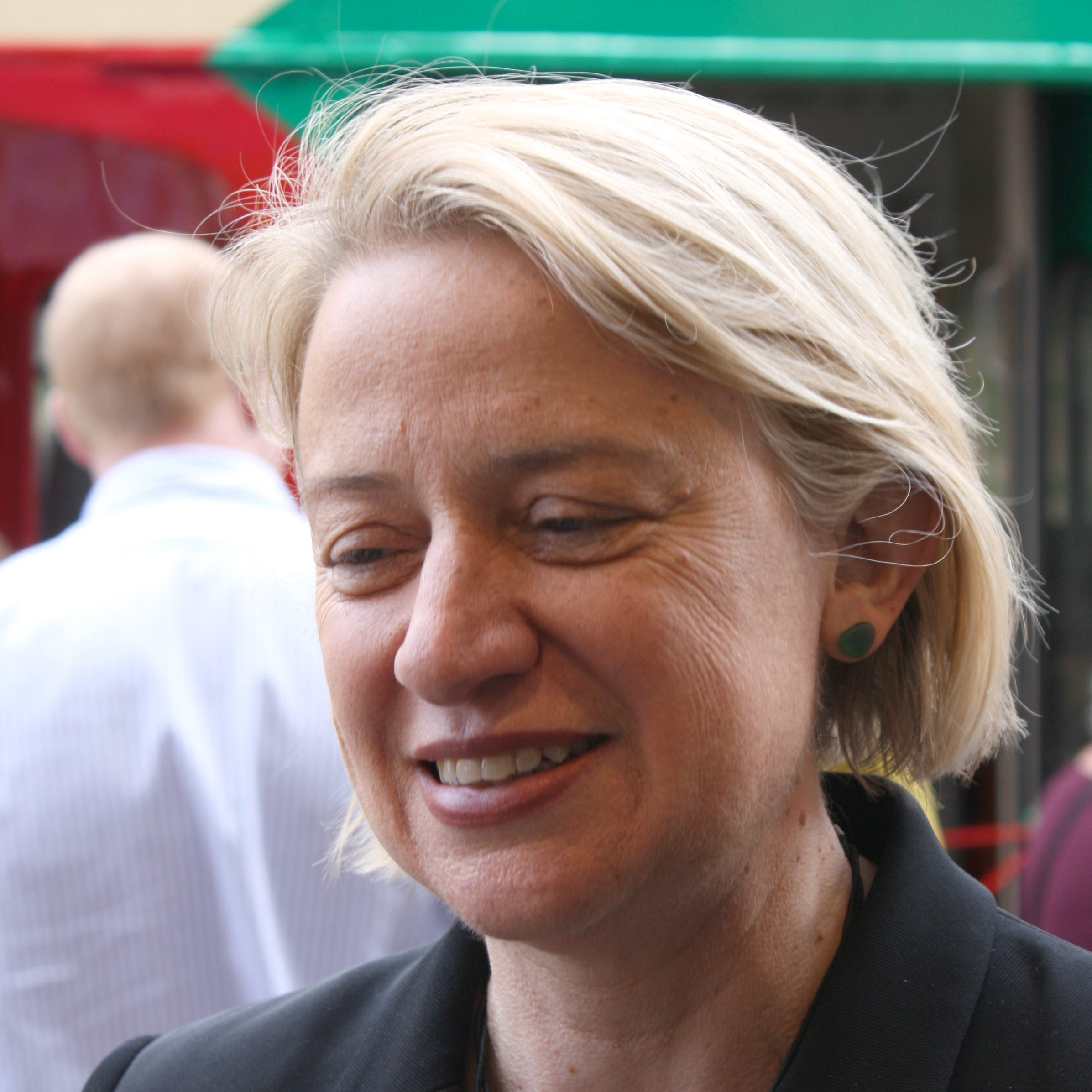
Natalie Bennett

- Natalie Bennett, leader of the Green Party of England and Wales
- Gerry Carroll, Northern Ireland People Before Profit MLA for West Belfast
- Cheri DiNovo, Ontario MPP (Ontario NDP)
- Neil Findlay, Scottish MSP (Labour Party)
- Colin Fox, former Scottish MSP (2003–2007) (Socialist Party)
- Jim Harris, former leader of the Green Party of Canada (2003–2006)
- Norm Kelly, Toronto City Councillor (Independent)
- Enrico Rossi, governor of Tuscany (Democratic Party)
- Larry Sanders, former Oxfordshire County councillor (2005–2013) (Green Party) (brother of Bernie Sanders)

=== Notable individuals ===
==== Activists, humanitarians, and labor leaders ====
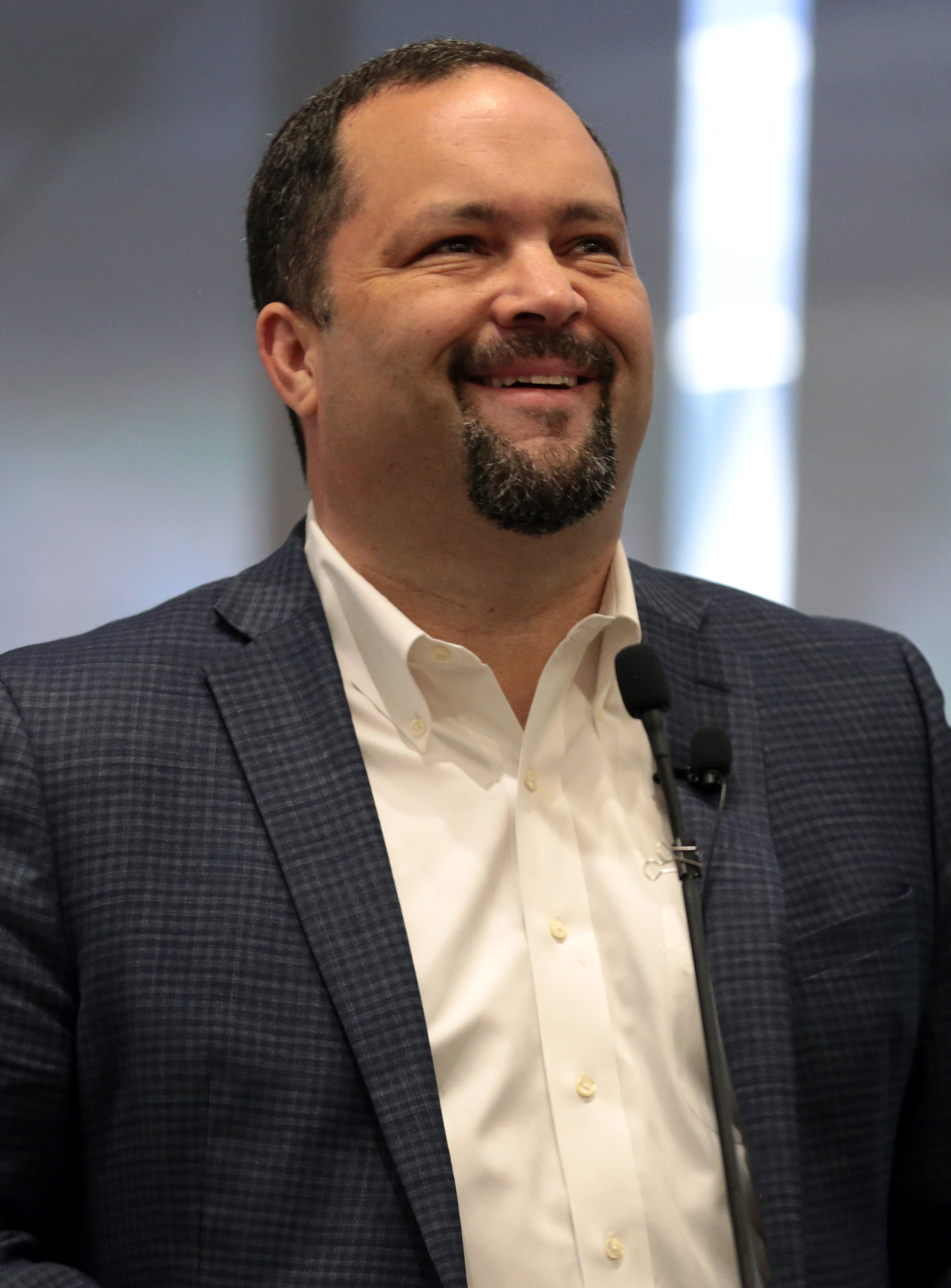
Benjamin Jealous

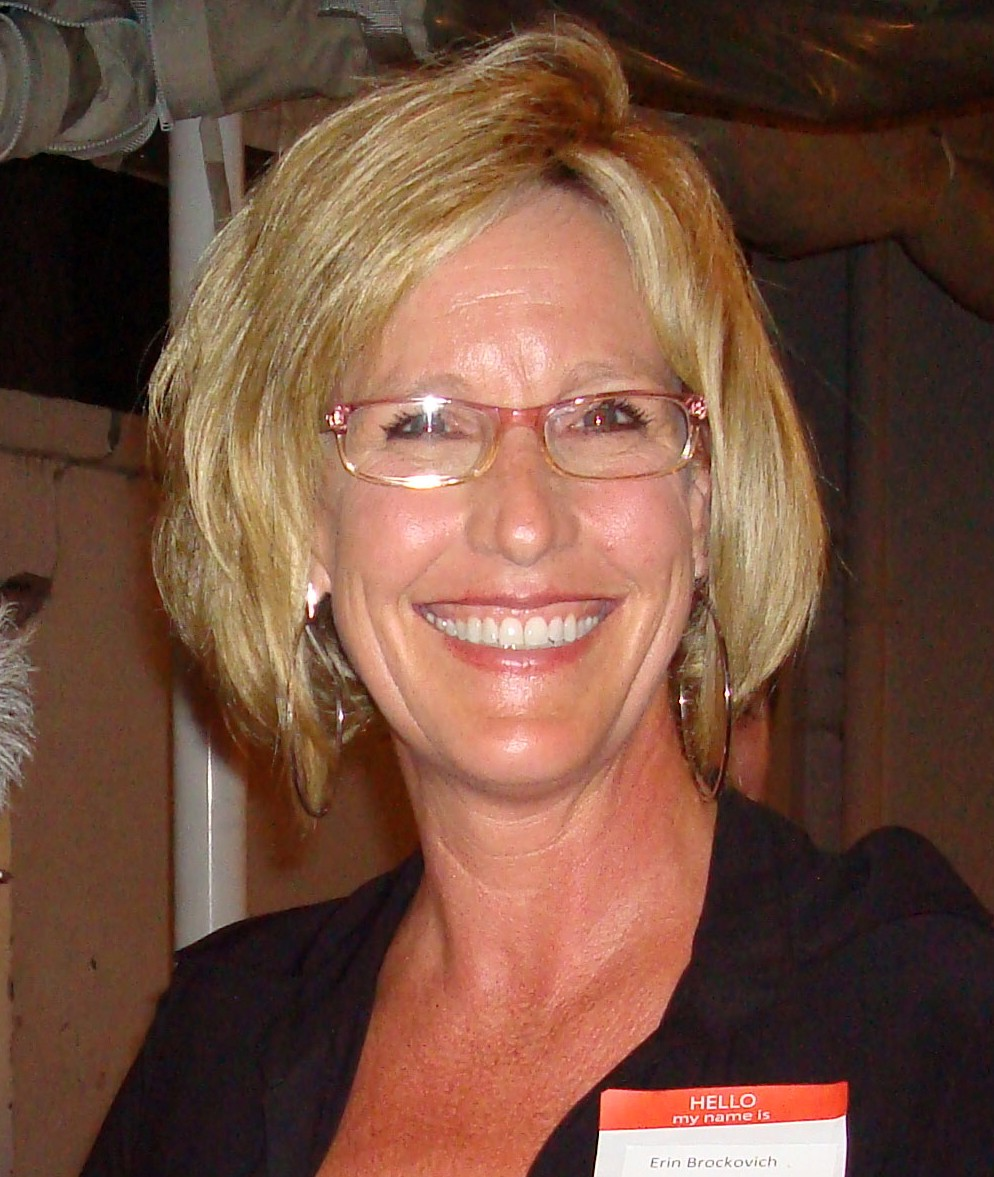
Erin Brockovich

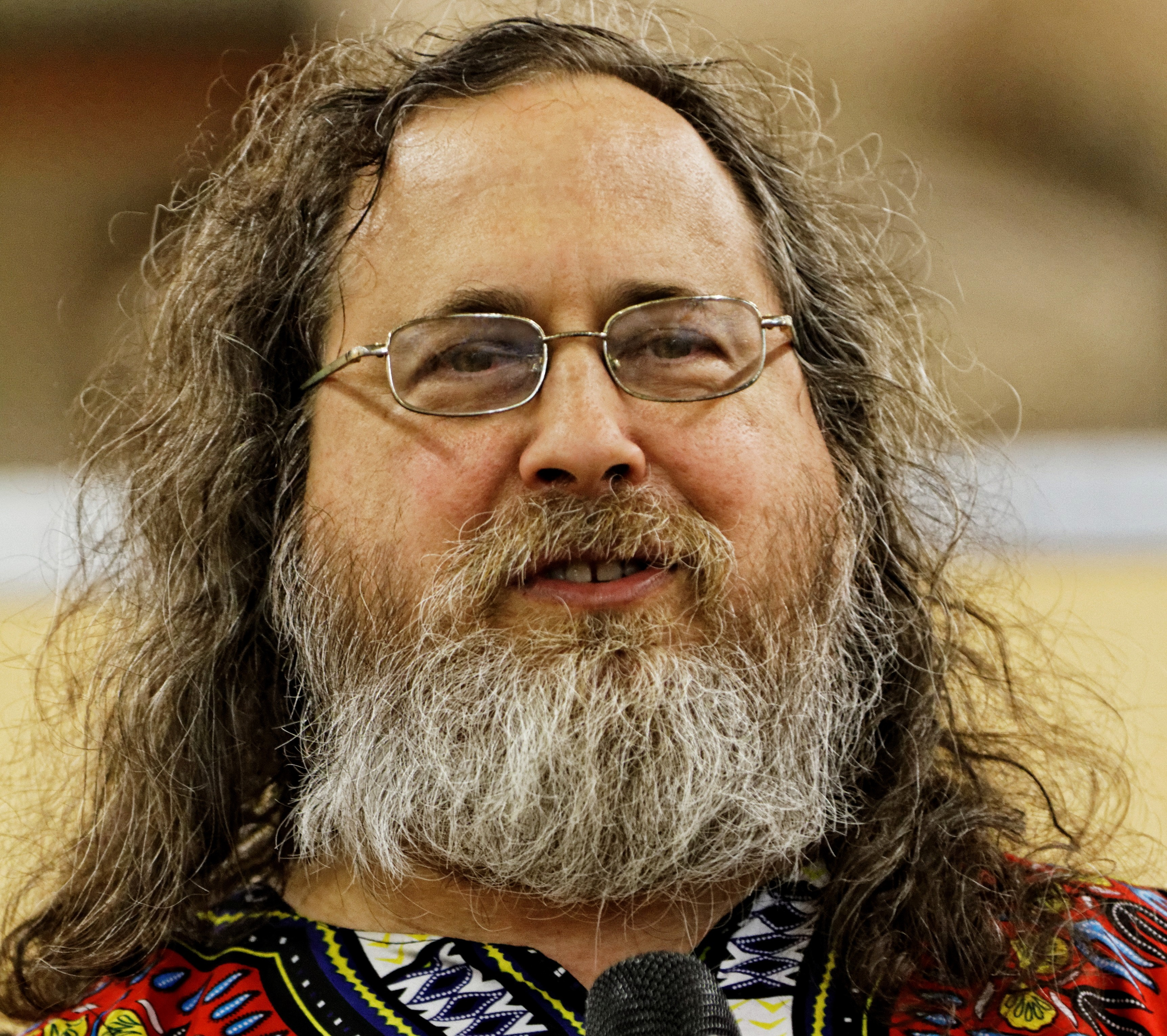
Richard Stallman

- Patch Adams, founder of Gesundheit! Institute
- John W. Boyd Jr., National Black Farmers Association founder and 2000 U.S. House candidate (D–VA)
- Erin Brockovich, environmental activist
- Jamal Harrison Bryant, founder of Empowerment Temple African Methodist Episcopal Church
- Helen Caldicott, physician, author and anti-nuclear advocate
- Charles R. Chamberlain, Democracy for America executive director
- Wade Davis, You Can Play executive director and former American football player
- Jim Dean, Democracy for America chairman
- Tim DeChristopher, environmental activist
- RoseAnn DeMoro, executive director, National Nurses United
- John Draper, computer programmer and hacker, former phreaker
- Jodie Evans, co-founder of CODEPINK
- Erica Garner, civil rights activist (daughter of Eric Garner)
- Jim Gerritsen, Organic Seed Growers and Trade Association president
- Wael Ghonim, internet activist and entrepreneur
- Thor Halvorssen, founder and CEO of Human Rights Foundation
- Julia Butterfly Hill, environmental activist and author
- Ruth Hull, journalist, attorney, activist, co-founder of Progressive Caucus of the California Democratic Party, founder of Patrick Henry Democratic Club of America
- Jonathan Jackson, Rainbow/PUSH national spokesman (son of Rev. Jesse Jackson)
- Benjamin Jealous, former NAACP president
- Shaun King, Black Lives Matter activist and writer
- Winona LaDuke, White Earth Land Recovery Project and Honor the Earth Executive Director
- Mordechai Liebling, former Jewish Funds for Justice executive vice president
- Bill McKibben, founder of climate change group 350.org
- David McReynolds, former Socialist Party USA presidential nominee and former chair of the War Resisters League
- Harold Meyerson, Democratic Socialists of America vice chair and The American Prospect editor-at-large
- Brady C. Olson, founder of Deez Nuts presidential campaign
- CJ Pearson, conservative activist (previously endorsed Rand Paul and Ted Cruz and subsequently endorsed Donald Trump)
- Bruce Perens, free software advocate
- Carolyn Raffensperger, co-founder of Science & Environmental Health Network
- Ray Rogers, labor strategist, organizer & director, Corporate Campaign, Inc.
- Kwame Rose, social activist
- Brant Rosen, co-founder and co-chairman of Jewish Voice for Peace, and American Friends Service Committee regional director
- Gyasi Ross, author and activist
- Sal Rosselli, National Union of Healthcare Workers President
- Linda Sarsour, executive director of Arab American Association of New York
- Yosi Sergant, publicist of the Barack Obama "Hope" poster
- Stanley Sheinbaum, peace and human rights activist
- Daniel Sieradski, writer and Occupy activist
- Ted Smith, founder of Silicon Valley Toxics Coalition and environmental activist
- Richard Stallman, founder of the GNU Project and the Free Software Foundation
- Jill Stein, Green Party presidential nominee in 2012 and 2016
- Zephyr Teachout, CEO & chairwoman of Mayday PAC and 2016 U.S. House candidate (NY)
- Nadezhda Tolokonnikova, member of protest groups Voina and Pussy Riot
- Arthur Waskow, leader in Jewish Renewal movement, co-founder of Institute for Policy Studies, and former DC alternate delegate
- Cameron Whitten, Occupy Portland activist
- Marianne Williamson, founder of Project Angel Food
- Claire Wineland, entrepreneur and chronic health activist
- James Zogby, president of Arab American Institute

==== Democratic Party figures ====
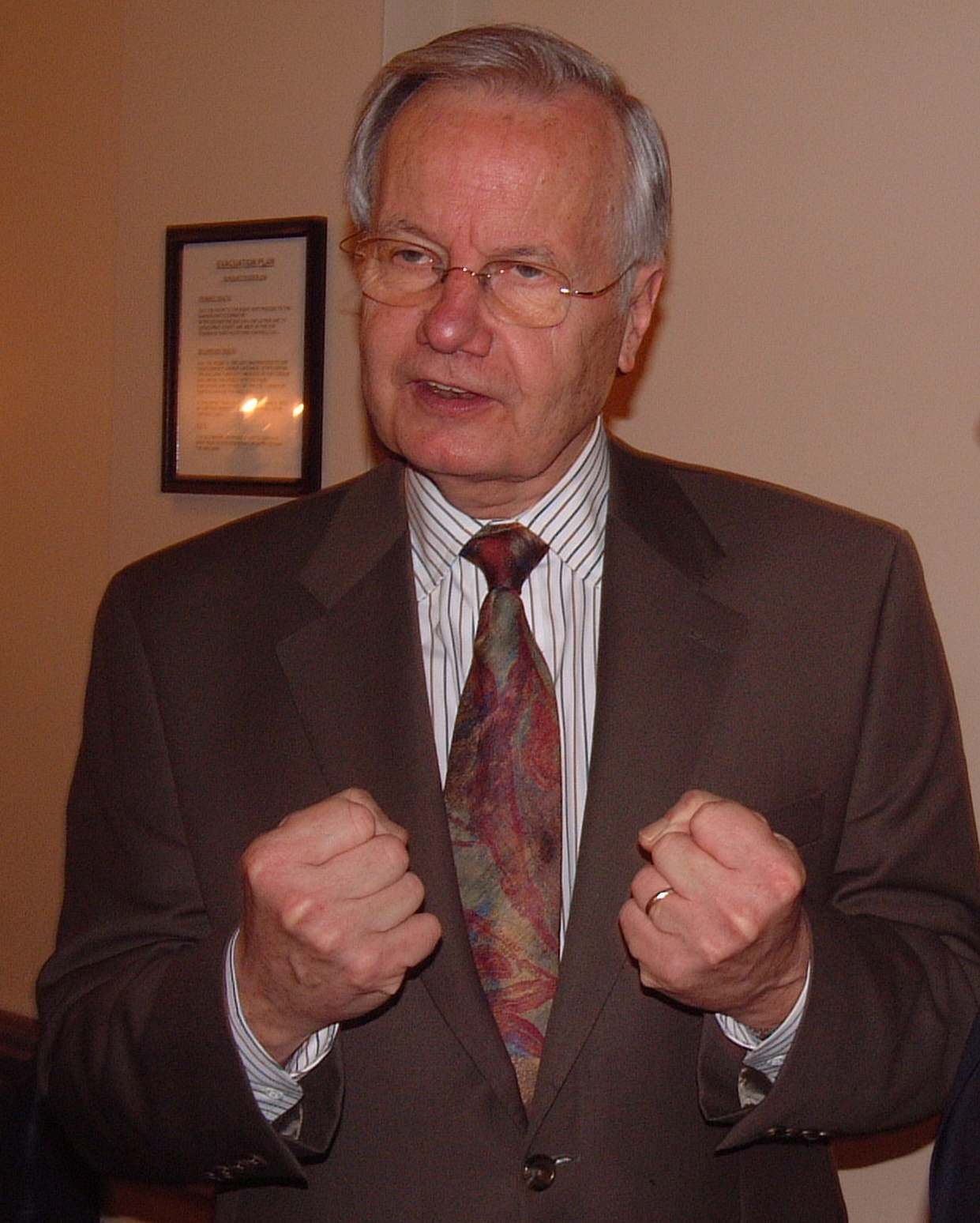
Bill Moyers

- Clay Aiken, 2014 U.S. House candidate (NC) and singer
- Zack Exley, political consultant and co-founder of New Organizing Institute
- Gary Kroeger, 2016 U.S. House candidate (IA) and actor
- David McReynolds, leader of Social Democrats, USA
- Jay Stamper, 2014 U.S. Senate candidate (SC)

==== Government officials ====
- Bill Moyers, 13th White House press secretary (1965–1967)
- Kal Penn, White House Office of Public Engagement and Intergovernmental Affairs associate director (2009–2011)
- Gus Speth, 5th chair of the Council on Environmental Quality (1979–1981)

==== Journalists and commentators ====
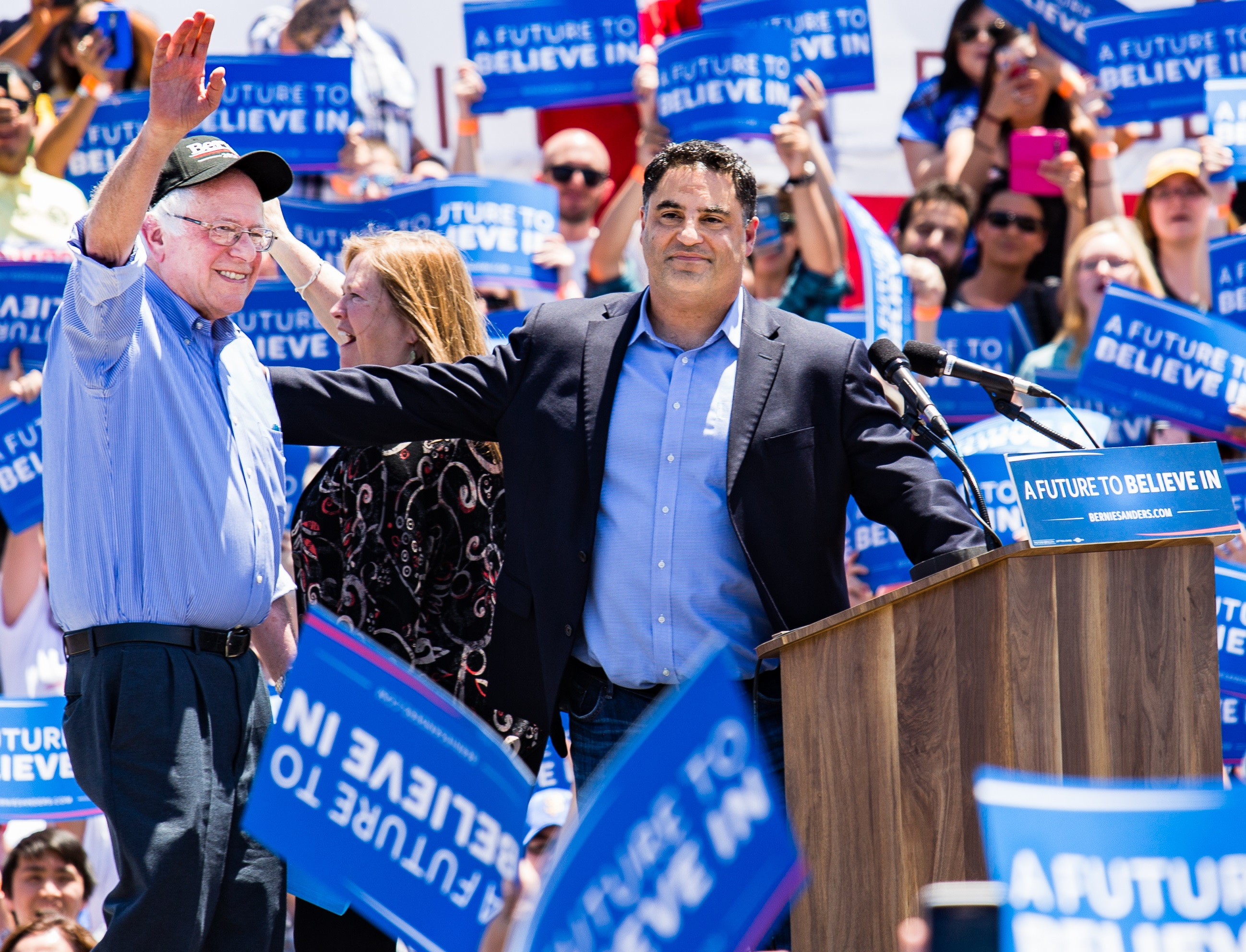
Cenk Uygur endorsing Sanders

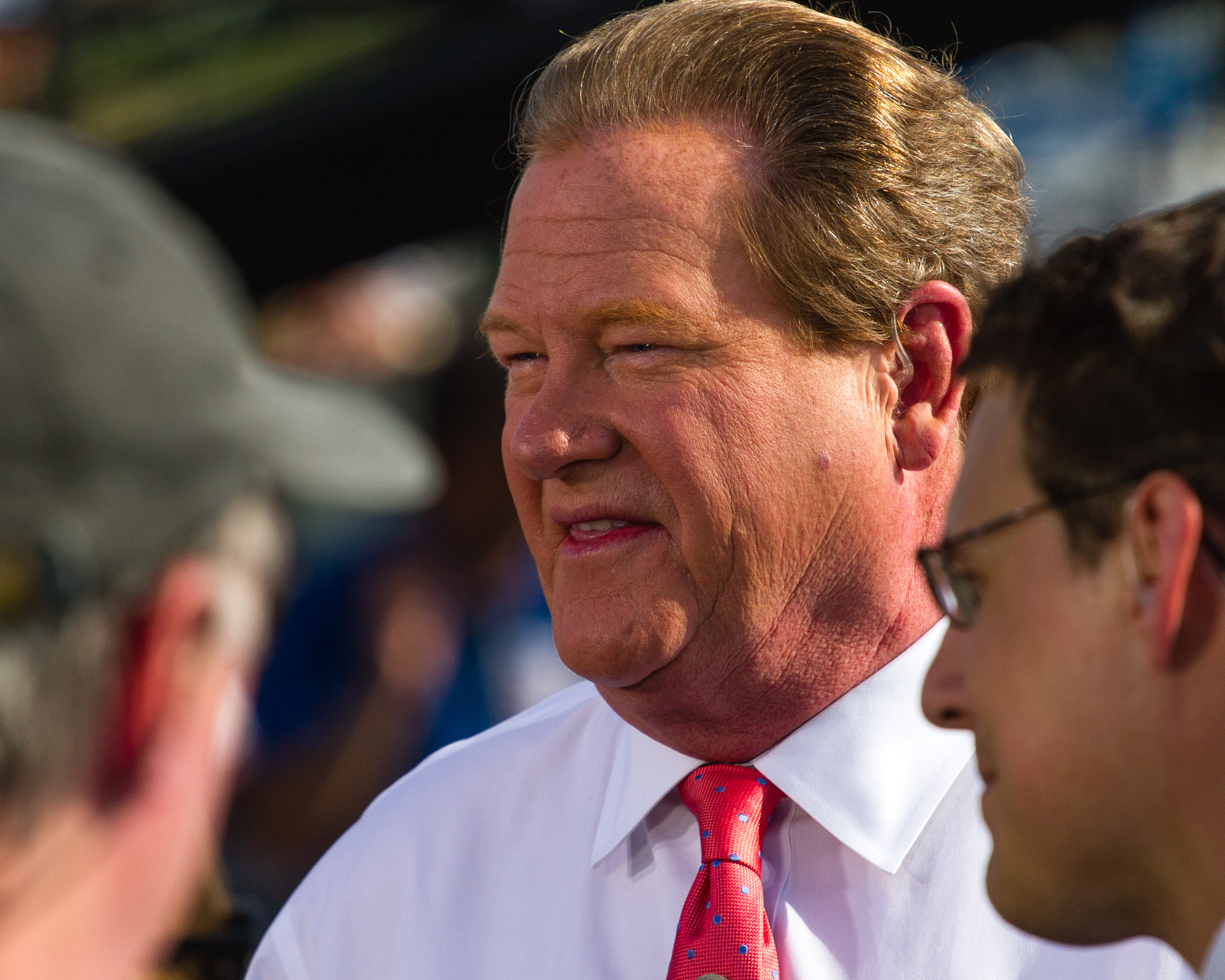
Ed Schultz

- Aaron Bastani, political commentator
- Diego Bianchi, journalist and host of Gazebo
- Brent Budowsky, journalist
- Dan Carlin, historian, journalist, and host of Common Sense and Hardcore History
- Kevin Carson, political writer
- Jordan Chariton, field reporter for The Young Turks
- Arthur Chu, columnist, former Jeopardy! champion
- Alan Colmes, host of The Alan Colmes Show, former co-host of Hannity and Colmes, political commentator for Fox News Channel and blogger
- Jamal Dajani, journalist and news producer
- Liza Featherstone, journalist and author
- John Fugelsang, comedian, actor, and host of radio talk show Tell Me Everything
- Amy Goodman, founder and co-host of Democracy Now!
- Thom Hartmann, host of The Thom Hartmann Program and The Big Picture with Thom Hartmann
- Doug Henwood, journalist and editor of Left Business Observer
- John Iadarola, creator of ThinkTank
- Owen Jones, columnist, political commentator and author
- Bill Kauffman
- Ana Kasparian, co-host and producer of The Young Turks
- Jamie Kilstein, writer, political comic, and host of Citizen Radio
- Stephen Kinzer, author, journalist, and academic
- Sally Kohn, CNN commentator
- Mike Malloy, host of The Mike Malloy Show
- Ben Mankiewicz, commentator on The Young Turks
- John Nichols, journalist
- David Pakman, host of The David Pakman Show
- Mike Papantonio, attorney and co-host of Ring of Fire
- Ron Reagan, journalist, former host of The Ron Reagan Show and Connected: Coast to Coast, and son of Ronald Reagan
- Sam Seder, comedian, actor, and co-host of Ring of Fire
- Ed Schultz, former host of The Ed Show and The Ed Schultz Show
- David Shuster, journalist
- Harry Leslie Smith, commentator
- Matt Taibbi, journalist
- Jonathan Tasini, strategist, organizer, activist, and writer
- Cenk Uygur, The Young Turks co-founder, business owner, activist, journalist and writer
- Katrina vanden Heuvel, editor and publisher of The Nation
- Lizz Winstead, commentator and co-creator of The Daily Show
- Elizabeth Wurtzel, journalist

==== Leaders in business ====
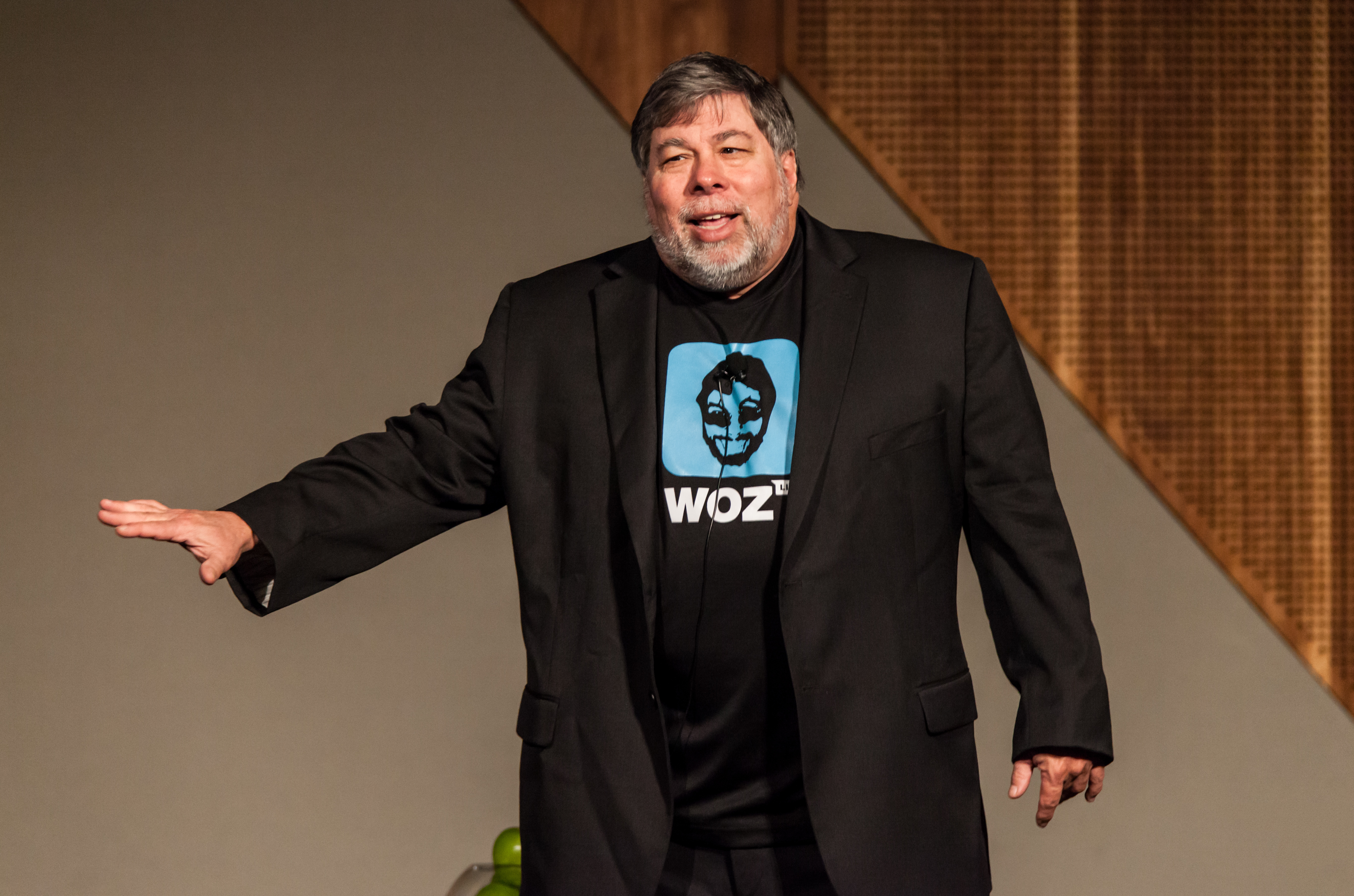
Steve Wozniak

- Sophia Amoruso, founder of Nasty Gal
- Ben Cohen, co-founder of Ben & Jerry's
- Kim Dotcom, entrepreneur and political activist
- Asher Edelman, financier and investor
- Jerry Greenfield, co-founder of Ben & Jerry's
- Jamie Masada, founder of Laugh Factory
- Tom Ortenberg, CEO of Open Road Films
- Steve Wozniak, co-founder of Apple Inc.

==== Scholars and critics ====
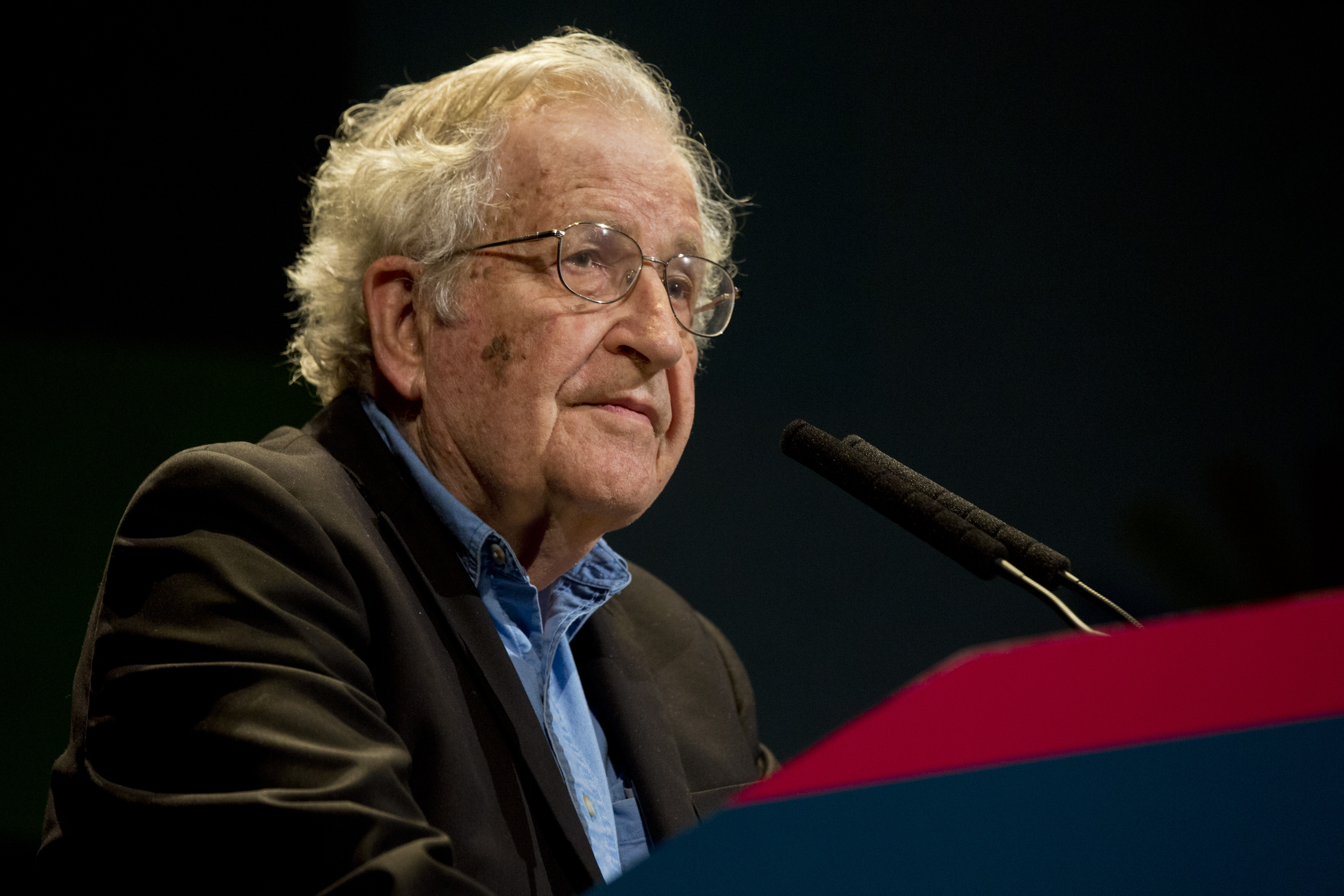
Noam Chomsky

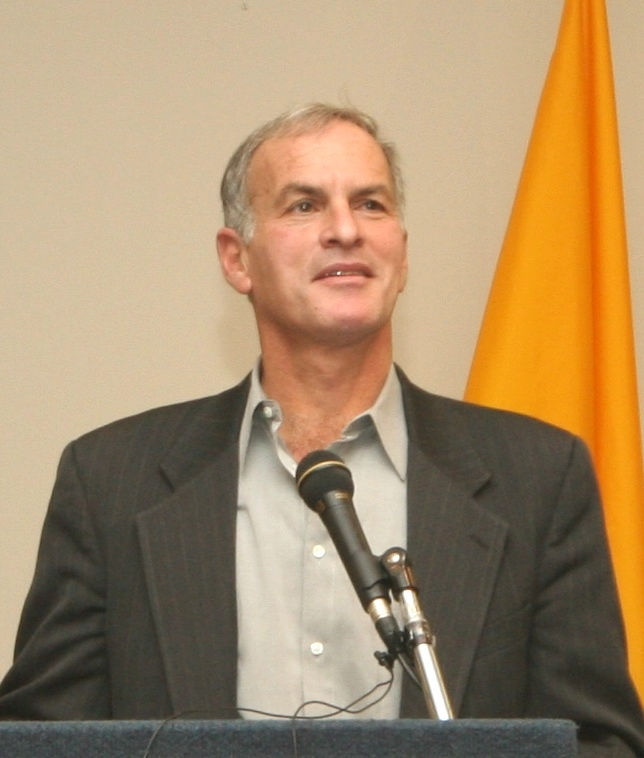
Norman Finkelstein

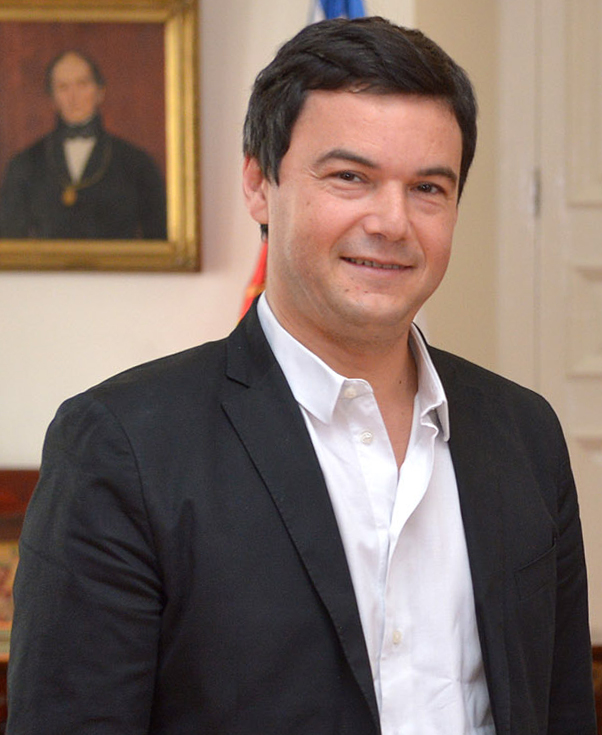
Thomas Piketty

- Rachel Adler, theologian
- Linda Martín Alcoff, philosopher and activist
- Dean Baker, Center for Economic and Policy Research co-founder
- Lourdes Benería, economist
- William K. Black, legal scholar and economist
- Wendy Brown, political scientist, author, and activist
- Robert Brulle, environmental sociologist
- Gary Chartier, associate dean of La Sierra University
- Vivek Chibber, sociologist
- Victoria Chick, economist
- Noam Chomsky, linguist, philosopher, and activist
- Steven M. Cohen, sociologist and expert in American Jewish Community
- Hamid Dabashi, sociologist and expert in Islamic studies
- William A. Darity, Jr., economist
- Gary Dorrien, ethicist and theologian
- Anthony Fantano, music blogger/vlogger behind The Needle Drop
- Thomas Ferguson, political scientist
- Leon Fink, historian
- Norman Finkelstein, political scientist and author
- Nancy Folbre, economist
- Thomas Frank, historian and political analyst
- Nancy Fraser, critical theorist and author
- James K. Galbraith, economist
- Jeffrey Guterman, psychologist
- Huck Gutman, literary scholar and former political advisor
- Steven Hahn, social and political historian
- Gerald S. Handel, sociologist
- Michael Hardt, philosopher and literary theorist
- Carl Hart, psychologist
- Tyson Herberger, political scientist, economist, and rabbi
- Robert C. Hockett, legal scholar
- James M. Jasper, sociologist
- Barbara Katz Rothman, sociologist
- Steve Keen, economist
- Stephanie Kelton, economist
- David Korten, business scholar
- David Laibman, economist
- Robert W. McChesney, media scholar
- Michael Meeropol, economist
- Walter Benn Michaels, literary theorist
- Ruth Milkman, sociologist
- Anne Norton, political scientist
- Camille Paglia, author and social critic
- David Naguib Pellow, environmental justice scholar and author
- Ann Pettifor, economist
- Massimo Pigliucci, philosopher
- Hasan Piker, Twitch streamer and political commentator
- Thomas Piketty, economist
- Frances Fox Piven, sociologist and activist
- Steven Pressman, economist
- Yasir Qadhi, scholar and writer
- Adolph L. Reed, Jr., political scientist and activist
- Jeffrey Sachs, economist
- Jane O'Meara Sanders, former president of Burlington College (wife of Bernie Sanders)
- Juliet Schor, sociologist and economist
- Joel Selvin, music critic
- Anwar Shaikh, economist
- Sylvie Simmons, rock historian
- Rogers Smith, political scientist and author
- Lester Spence, political scientist and social commentator
- Bhaskar Sunkara, founder of Jacobin magazine
- Andrew Szasz, environmental sociologist
- Pavlina R. Tcherneva, economist
- John Weeks, economist
- Cornel West, philosopher and activist
- Jeffrey A. Winters, political scientist
- L. Randall Wray, economist

==== Writers, filmmakers and visual artists ====
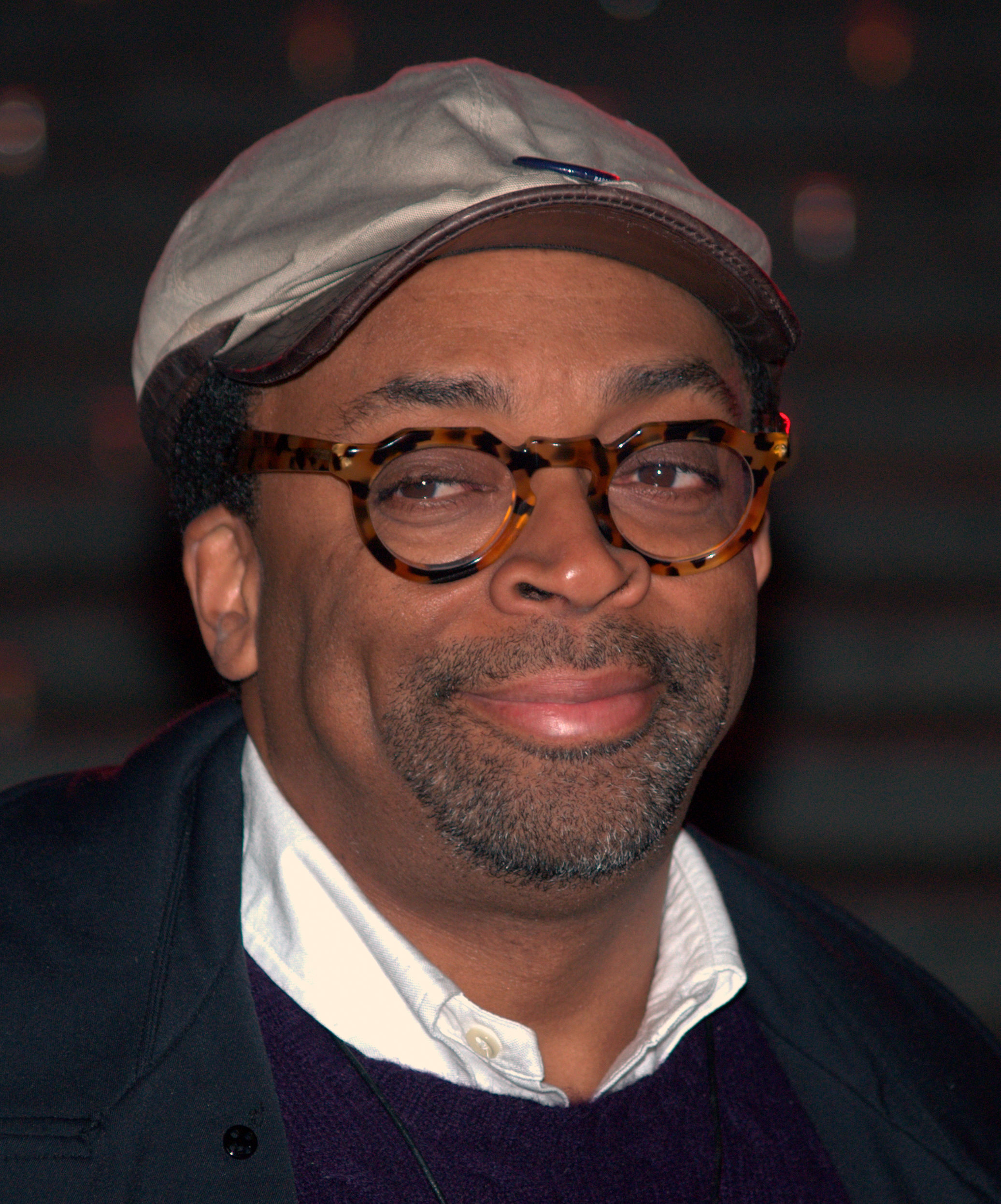
Spike Lee

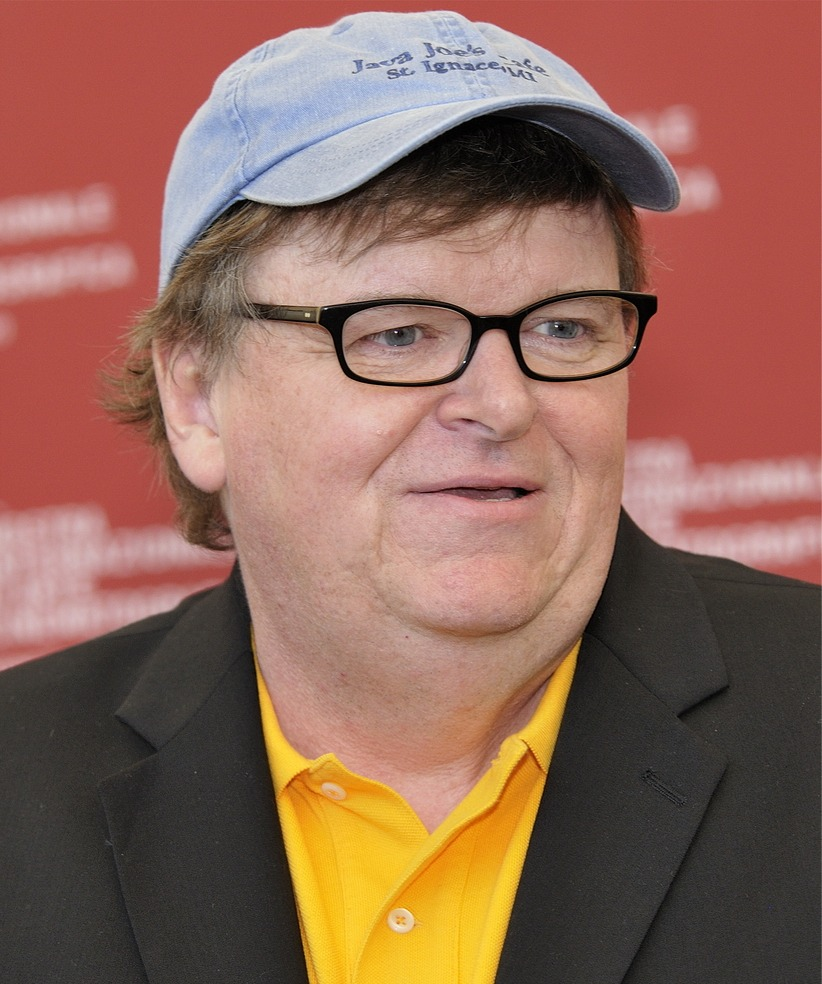
Michael Moore

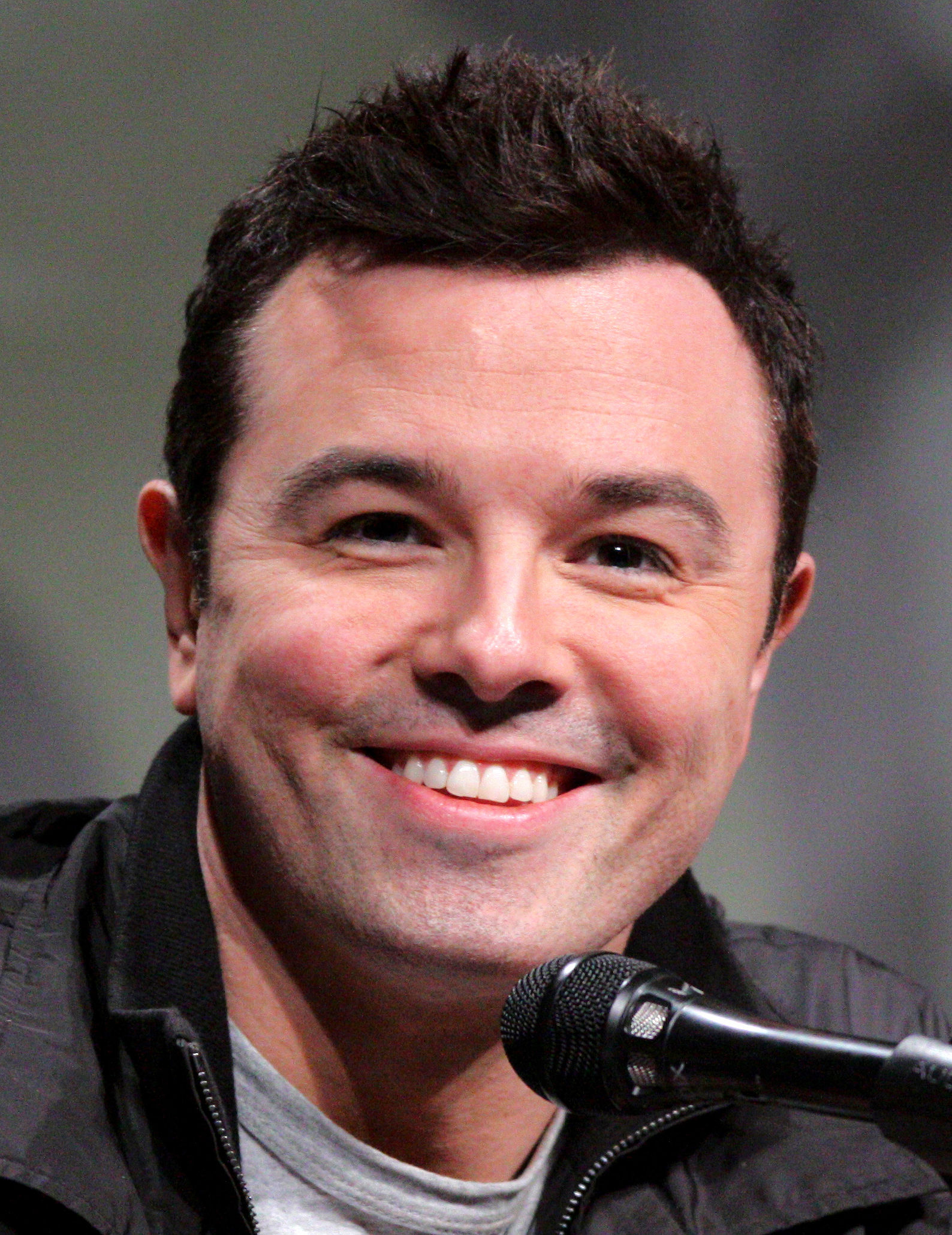
Seth MacFarlane

- Pat Bagley, editorial cartoonist
- Yves Bigerel, comic book artist and animator
- Norm Breyfogle, comic book artist
- Ta-Nehisi Coates, writer, journalist, and educator
- Matthew Cooke, film producer and director
- Hank Corwin, film editor
- Frank Darabont, screenwriter, film director and producer
- Mike Drucker, comedy writer and stand-up comic
- Alison Eastwood, director
- Emek, designer, illustrator, and fine art painter
- Lydia Emily, street artist, muralist, and oil painter
- Ron English, contemporary artist
- Shepard Fairey, contemporary street artist, activist, and founder of OBEY
- Charles Ferguson, director
- Josh Fox, documentary filmmaker and environmental activist
- Terry Gilliam, director, animator, and screenwriter
- David Holden, screenwriter
- Linda Joy Holtzman, author and rabbi
- Max Joseph, film director, producer, and writer
- Mike Kappus, record producer and manager
- Lloyd Kaufman, filmmaker and co-founder of Troma Entertainment
- Daniel Kellison, television and film producer
- Howie Klein, record producer and activist
- Naomi Klein, writer and filmmaker
- Matt Koff, comedian and The Daily Show writer
- Bryan Konietzko, animation director, writer, and producer
- Krystine Kryttre, alternative comics artist
- Alicia Bay Laurel, author, visual artist, musician, and activist
- Malcolm D. Lee, director, screenwriter, and producer
- Marie Myung-Ok Lee, author and essayist
- Spike Lee, director, producer, writer, and actor
- Jonathan Lethem, novelist
- David Lynch, director, writer, musician, and painter
- Seth MacFarlane, actor, animator, and singer, creator of Family Guy
- Spencer Madsen, writer, poet, and founding editor of Sorry House
- Craig McCracken, animator, writer, director and producer
- Adam McKay, screenwriter, director, comedian, and actor
- Michael Moore, documentary filmmaker
- Brad Neely, comic book artist and television writer
- Thurop Van Orman, director, animator, voice actor and writer
- Annabel Park, documentary filmmaker and activist
- Oren Peli, director, producer, and screenwriter
- Shira Piven, director
- Ted Rall, editorial cartoonist and writer
- Spencer Rothbell, writer and voice actor
- Stuart Schuffman, travel writer and blogger
- Oliver Stone, director, screenwriter, and producer
- Todd Tobias, record producer and musician
- Lana Wachowski, screenwriter, director, and producer
- Vincent Waller, animator and writer
- Haskell Wexler, cinematographer, film producer and director

=== Celebrities ===
==== Actors ====
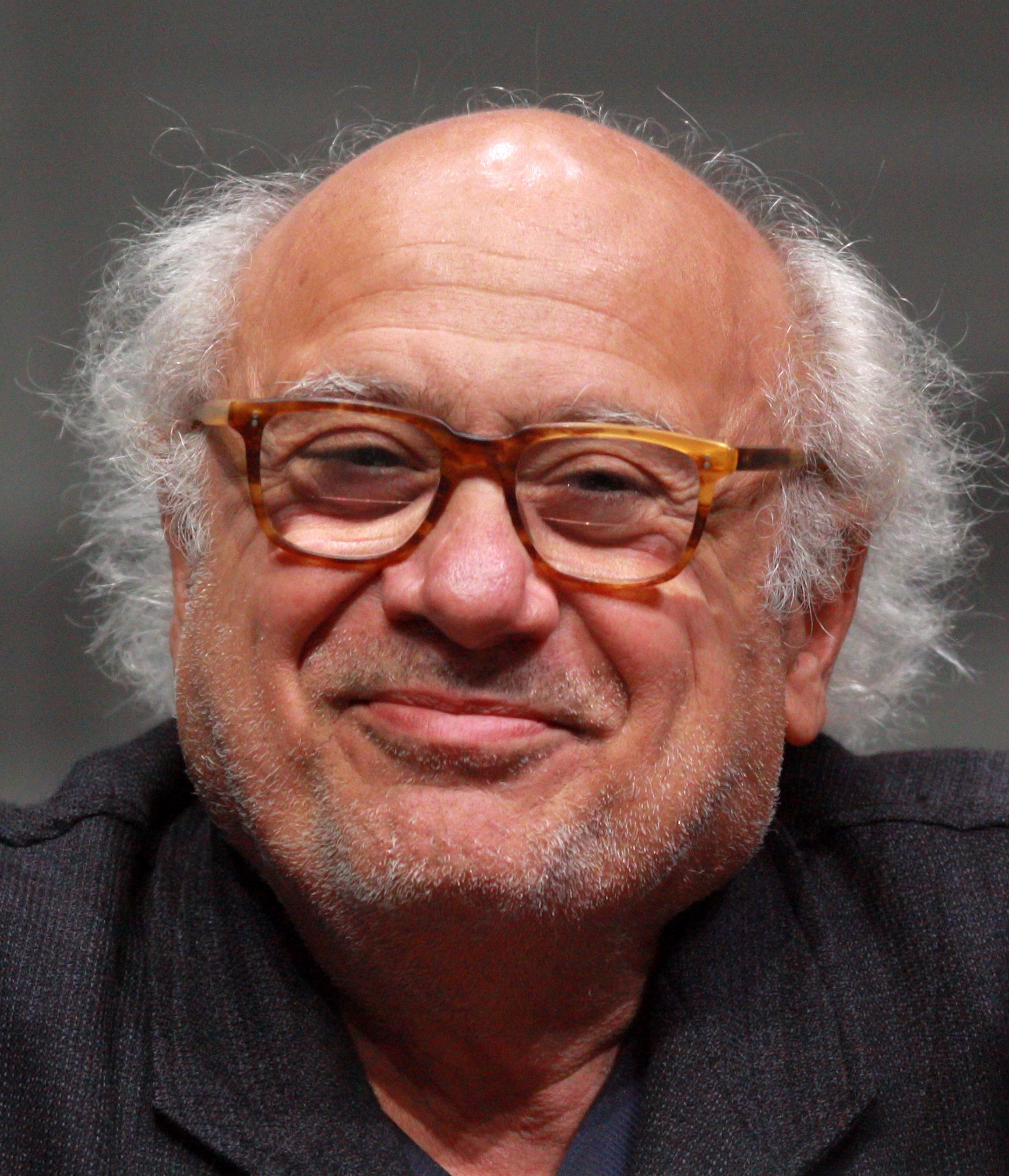
Danny DeVito

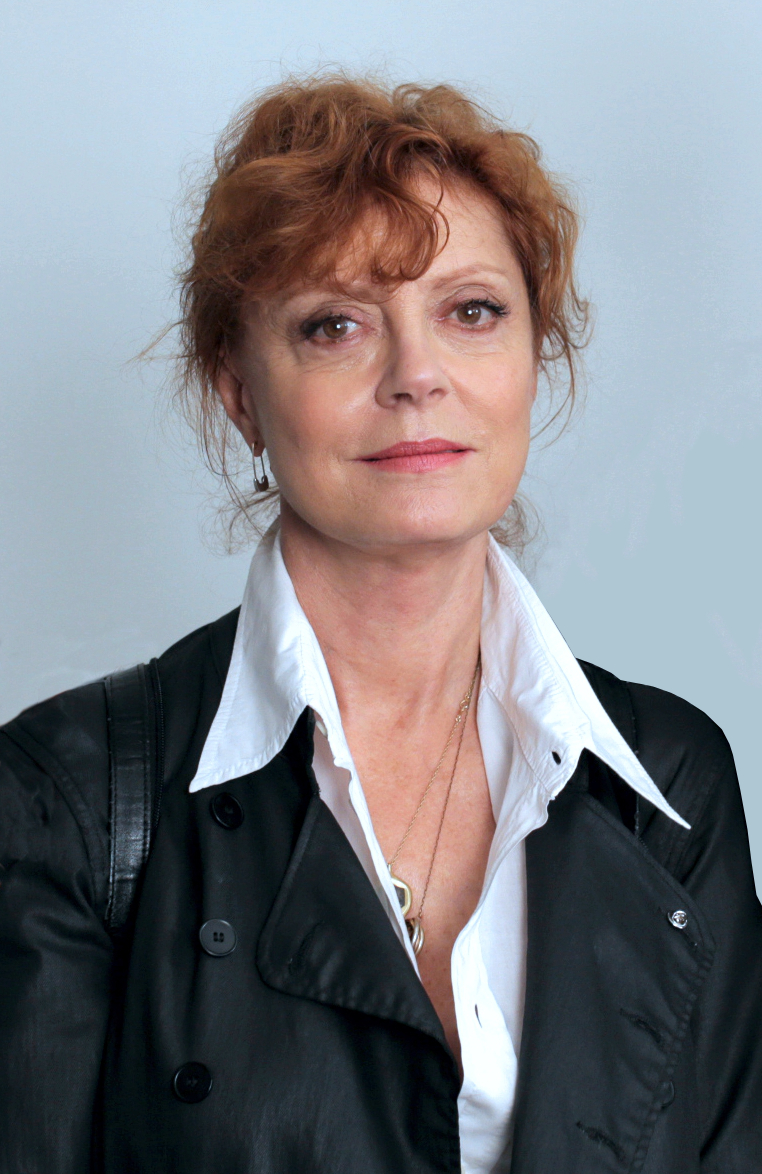
Susan Sarandon

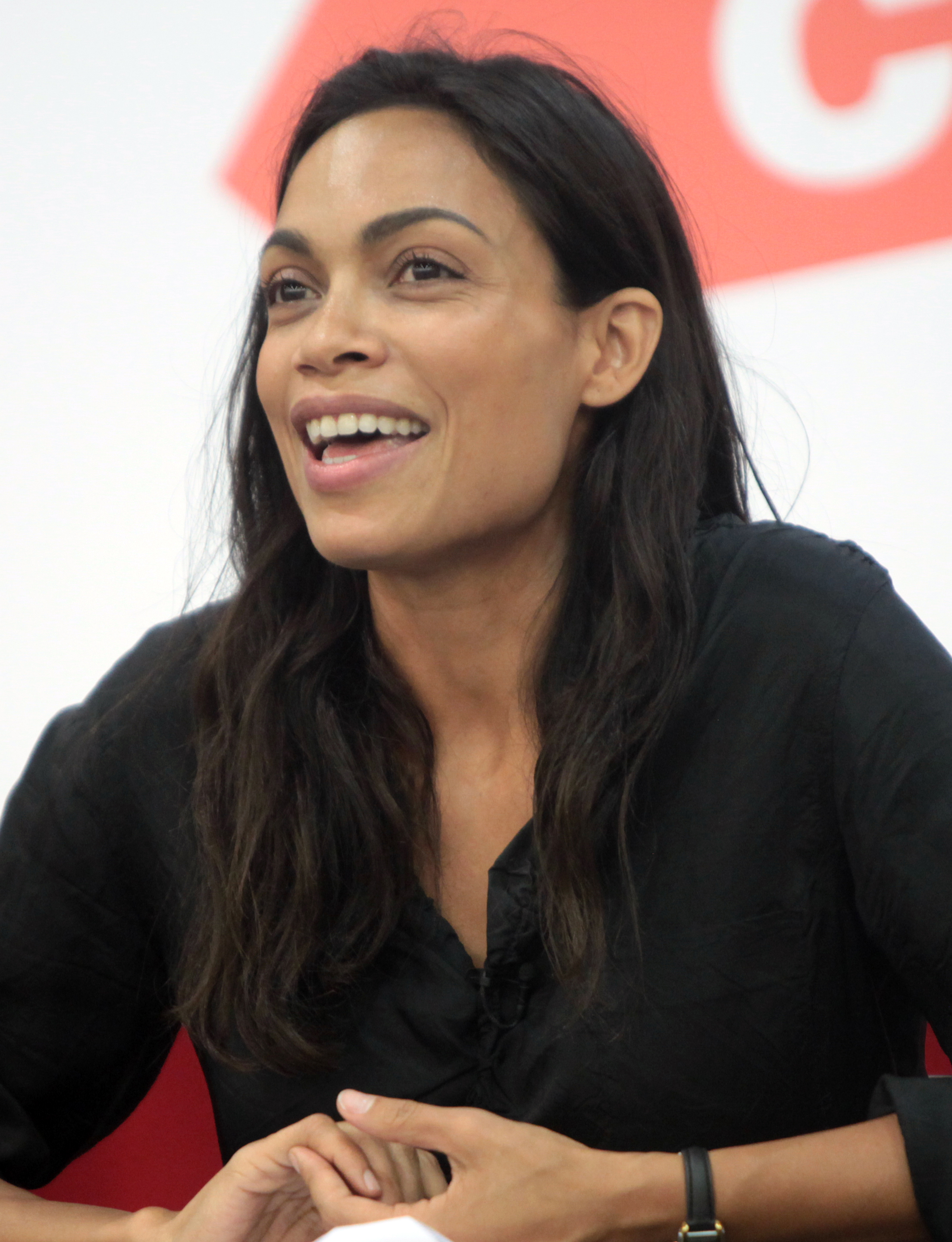
Rosario Dawson

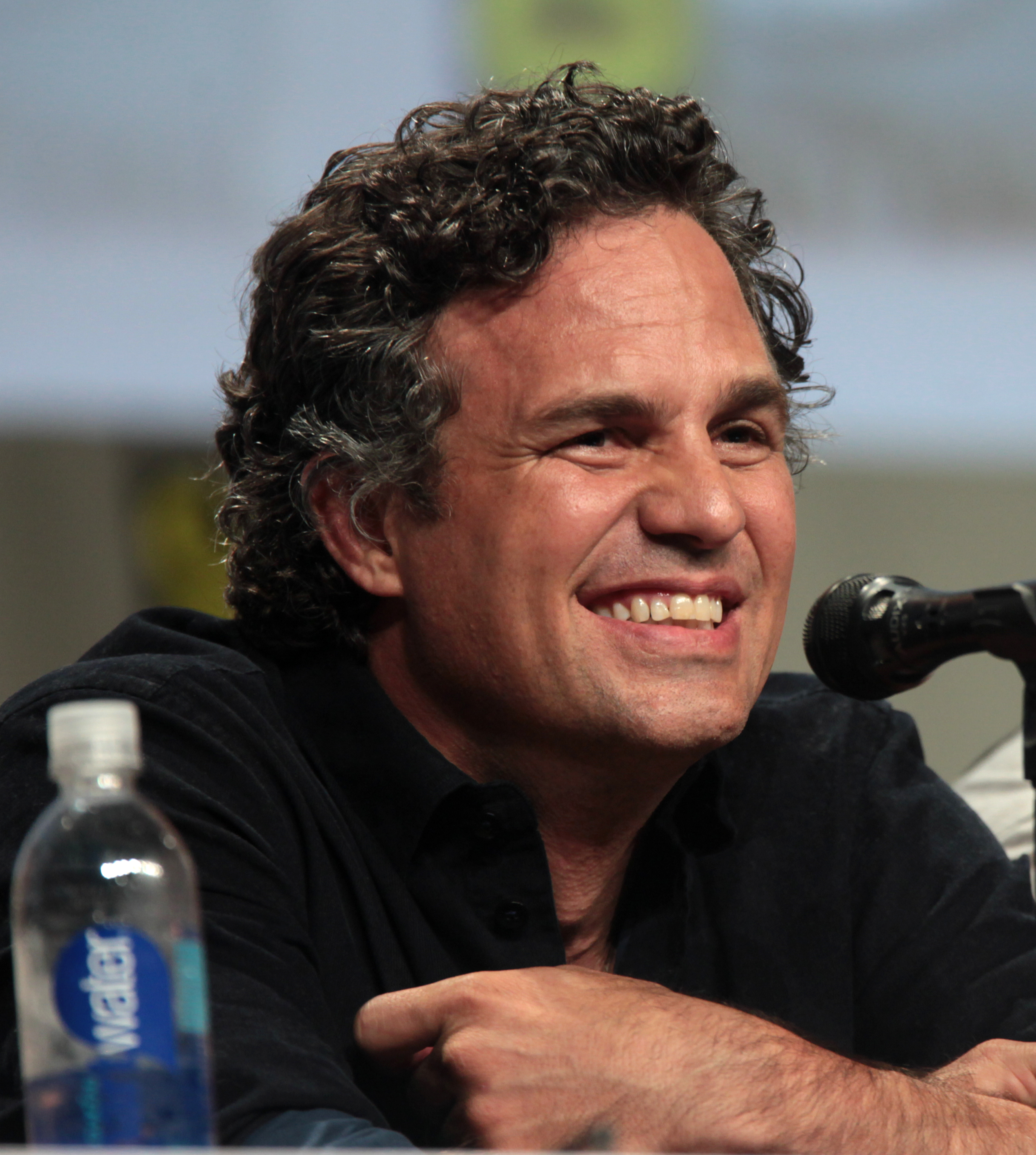
Mark Ruffalo

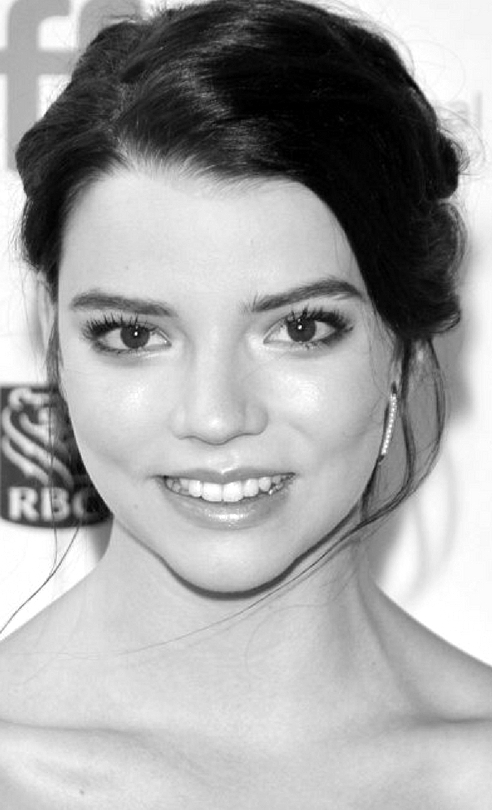
Anya Taylor-Joy

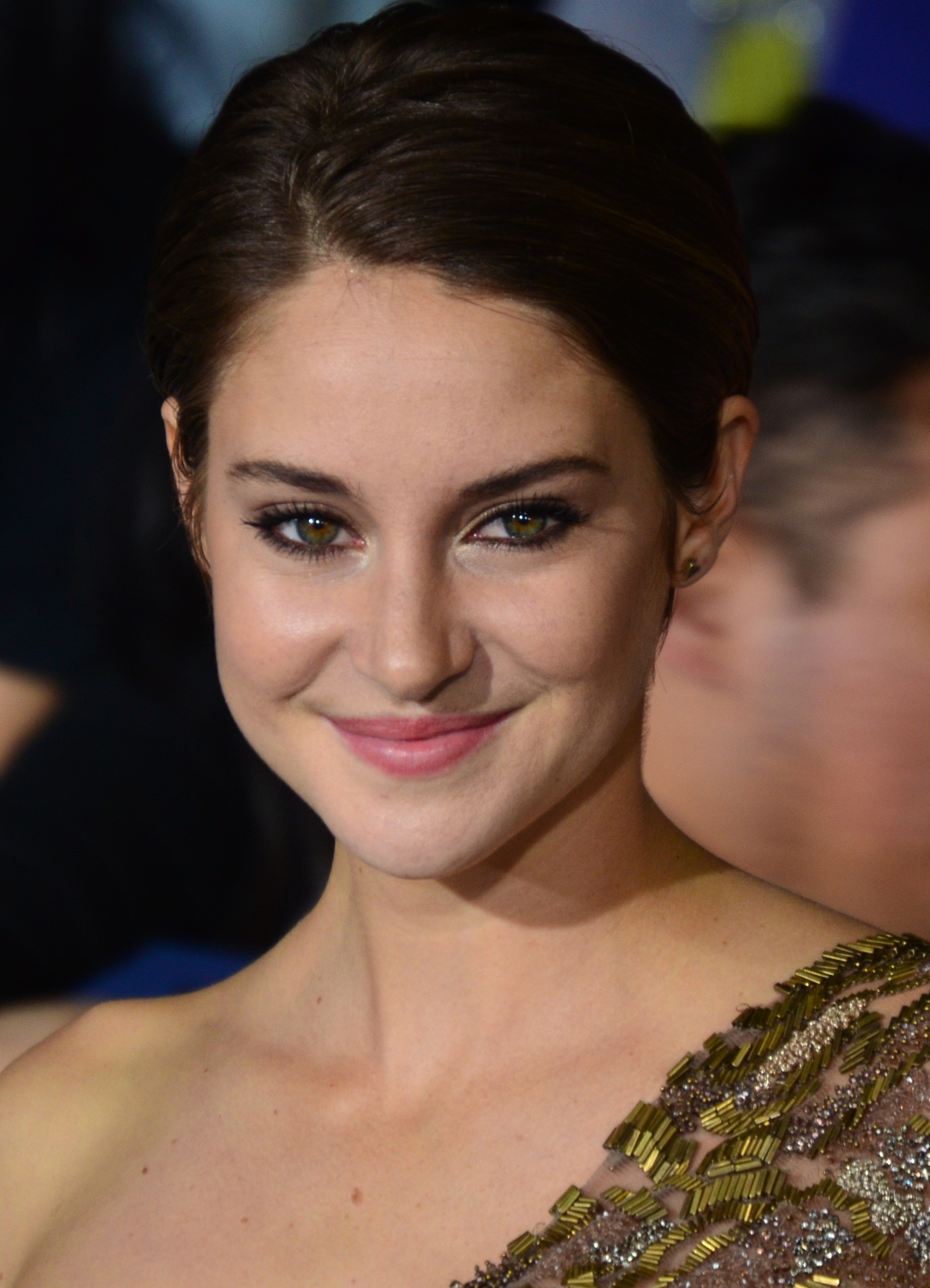
Shailene Woodley

- Patrick J. Adams
- Joanna Angel
- Will Arnett
- Justin Bartha
- Jason Bateman
- Kristin Bauer van Straten
- Stephen Bishop
- Rowan Blanchard
- Steve Blum
- Madeline Brewer
- Mehcad Brooks
- Neve Campbell
- Charlie Carver
- Max Carver
- Reg E. Cathey
- Amber Lee Connors
- Natalia Cordova-Buckley
- Nicolaj Coster-Waldau
- Daniel Craig
- James Cromwell
- David Cross
- Alan Cumming
- John Cusack
- William Daniels
- Rosario Dawson
- Lily-Rose Depp (Note: Depp was born on May 27, 1999, meaning she would have been below the age to vote in the primary or general)
- Danny DeVito
- Eliza Dushku
- Francesca Eastwood
- Will Ferrell
- Frances Fisher
- Ray Fisher
- Ben Foster
- Jeff Garlin
- Danny Glover
- Nicholas Gonzalez
- Sprague Grayden
- Sasha Grey
- Jasmine Guy
- Luis Guzmán
- Deidre Hall
- Brian Hamilton
- Daryl Hannah
- Erin Heatherton
- J. G. Hertzler
- Torri Higginson
- Brendan Hines
- Gaby Hoffmann
- Hal Holbrook
- Willa Holland
- Josh Hutcherson
- Milla Jovovich
- Alex Karpovsky
- Vincent Kartheiser
- Mimi Kennedy
- Margot Kidder
- Laura Kightlinger
- David Koechner
- Zoë Kravitz
- Shia LaBeouf
- Jake Lacy
- Rachelle Lefevre
- Donovan Leitch
- Ted Levine
- Juliette Lewis
- Justin Long
- George Lopez
- Jessica Lowndes
- Jena Malone
- Heather Matarazzo
- Rachel McAdams
- Holt McCallany
- Breckin Meyer
- Alyssa Milano
- Ezra Miller
- Hasan Minhaj
- D.W. Moffett
- Alfred Molina
- James Morrison
- Viggo Mortensen
- Karla Mosley
- Connor Paolo
- Rhea Perlman
- Joaquin Phoenix
- Jeremy Piven
- Anthony Ramos
- Emily Ratajkowski
- Nikki Reed
- John C. Reilly
- Tim Robbins
- Tim Roth
- Mark Ruffalo
- Jonathan Sadowski
- Kendrick Sampson
- Susan Sarandon
- Adam Savage
- Richard Schiff
- Liev Schreiber
- Reid Scott
- Chloë Sevigny
- Daniel Sharman
- Alicia Silverstone
- Frazer Smith
- Bill Smitrovich
- Cole Sprouse
- Dan Stevens
- Fisher Stevens
- Wes Studi
- Anya Taylor-Joy
- Tessa Thompson
- Maura Tierney
- Dick Van Dyke
- Milana Vayntrub
- George Wendt
- Devon Werkheiser
- Paul Wesley
- Wil Wheaton
- Kristen Wiig
- Harland Williams
- Elijah Wood
- Shailene Woodley
- Charlyne Yi
- Sasheer Zamata

==== Comedians ====
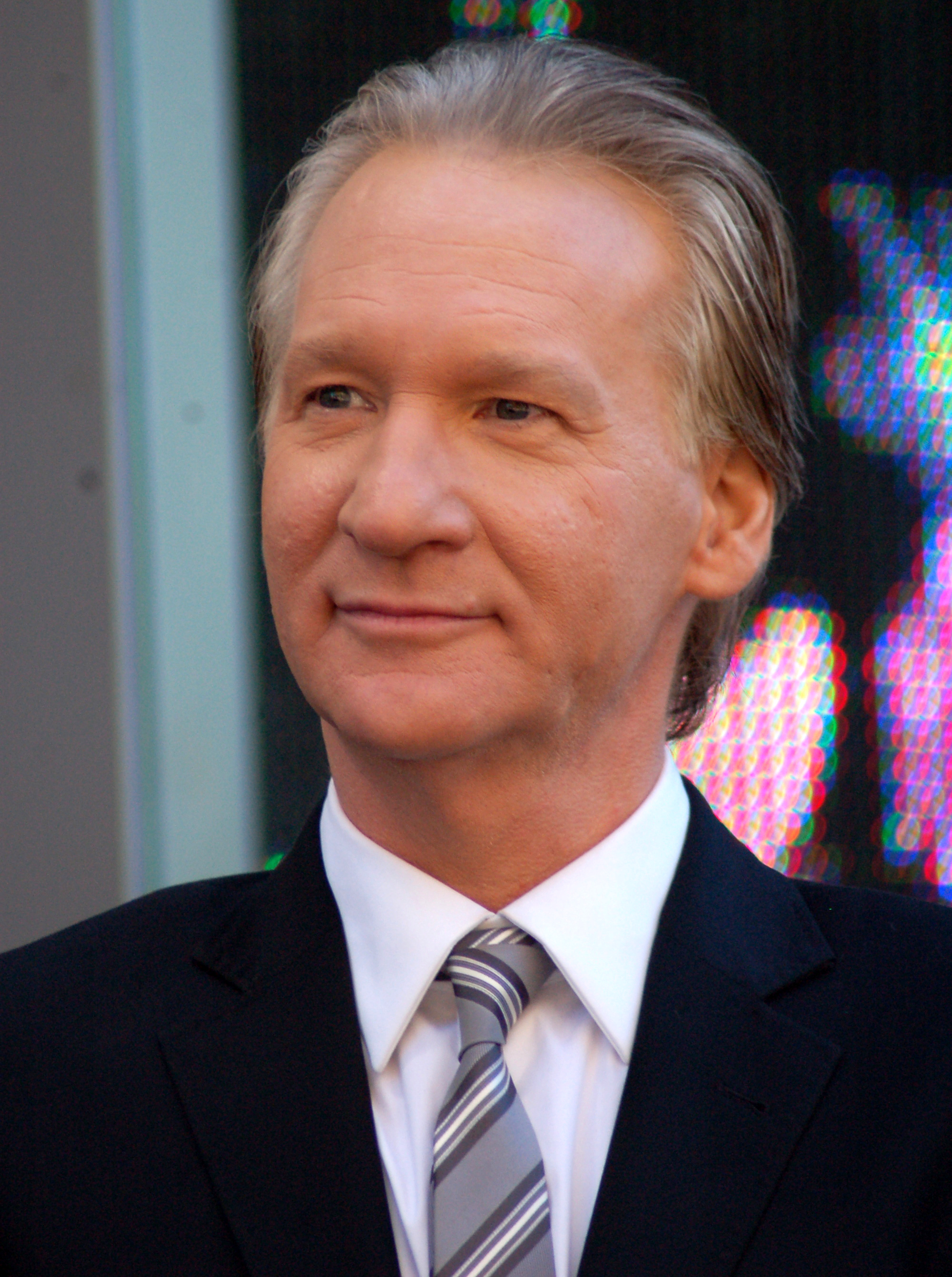
Bill Maher

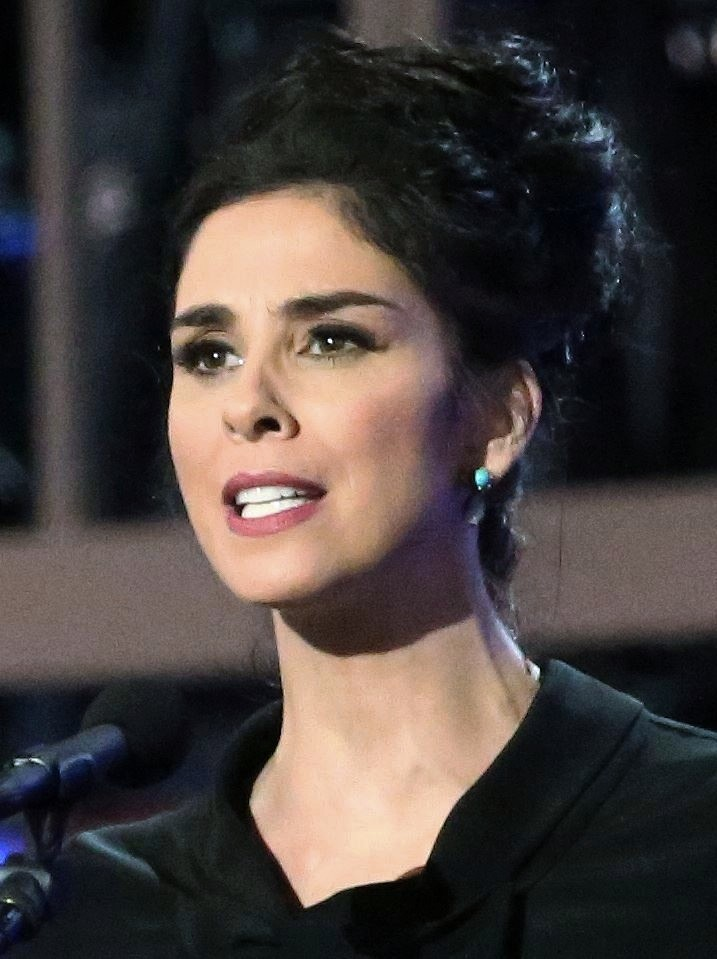
Sarah Silverman

- James Adomian
- Ted Alexandro
- Joe Bereta
- Lewis Black
- Bill Burr
- Dave Chappelle
- Margaret Cho
- Tommy Chong
- Irwin Corey
- Barry Crimmins
- Rob Delaney
- Jimmy Dore
- Ian Edwards
- Janeane Garofalo
- Tiffany Haddish
- Steve Hofstetter
- Dom Irrera
- Maz Jobrani
- Seth MacFarlane
- Bill Maher
- Marc Maron
- Kevin Nealon
- Patton Oswalt
- Carl Reiner
- Jeff Richards
- Paul Rodriguez
- Tom Scharpling
- Sarah Silverman
- Doug Stanhope
- Jim Tavaré
- Brandon Wardell
- Larry Wilmore

==== Athletes and sports figures ====
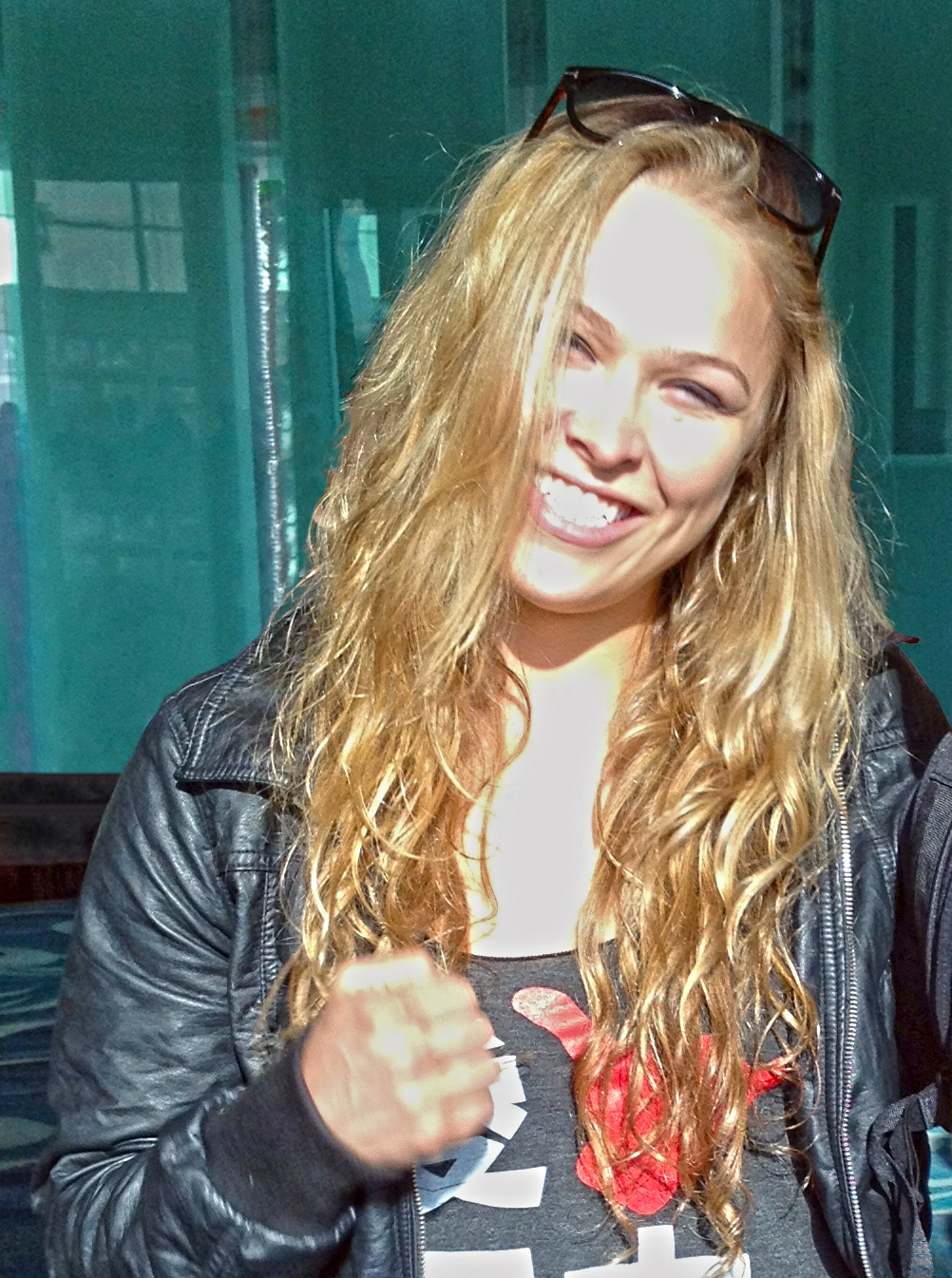
Ronda Rousey

- Michael Bennett, NFL player
- Jim Cornette, professional wrestling manager, booker, promoter, and commentator
- Juan Debiedma, professional gamer
- Jon Fitch, mixed martial artist
- Chad Johnson, former NFL player
- Bill "Spaceman" Lee, former MLB pitcher and 2016 Gubernatorial candidate (VT)
- Aaron Maybin, former NFL player
- Shane Mosley, professional boxer
- Ronda Rousey, UFC fighter WWE wrestler
- Wanderlei Silva, retired UFC fighter
- David Starr, professional wrestler
- Frank Viola, former MLB pitcher
- Frank Viola III, former professional baseball player

==== Media personalities and socialites ====
- Courtney Act, drag queen
- Lady Bunny, drag queen
- Charlamagne tha God, radio host
- Ebro Darden, radio host
- Adore Delano, drag queen and singer-songwriter
- Zach Hadel, YouTuber and animator
- Hannah Hart, YouTuber
- JonTron, YouTuber
- TJ Kirk, YouTuber
- Bridget Malcolm, model
- Selema Masekela, TV host
- Sharon Needles, drag queen and musician
- Daniel Negreanu, professional poker player
- Tyler Oakley, YouTuber and activist
- Tim Pool, journalist and political commentator
- Santino Rice, fashion designer
- Charlotte Ronson, fashion designer
- Shaun Ross, model
- Andrew Zimmern, chef

==== Voice artists and musicians ====
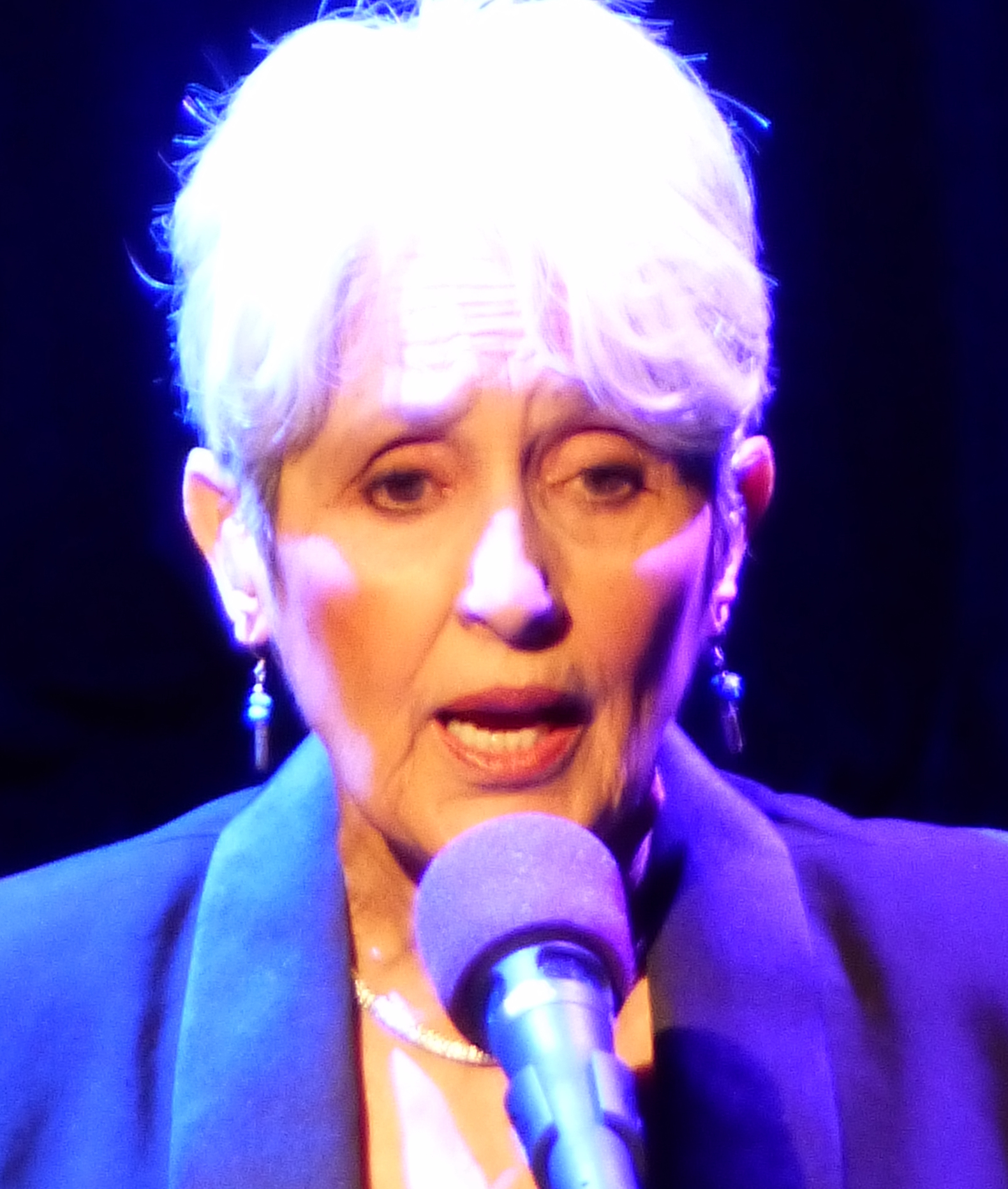
Joan Baez

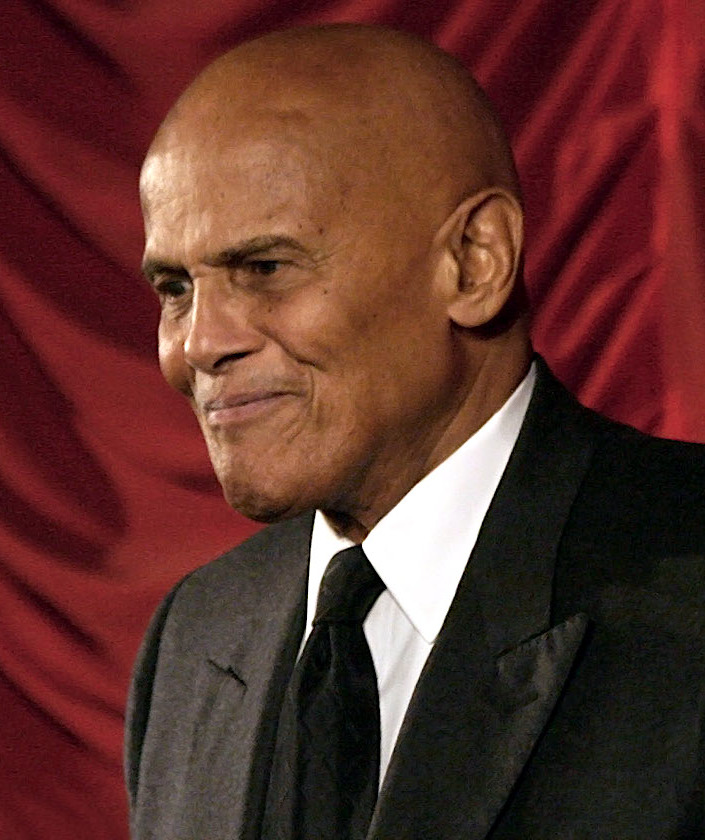
Harry Belafonte

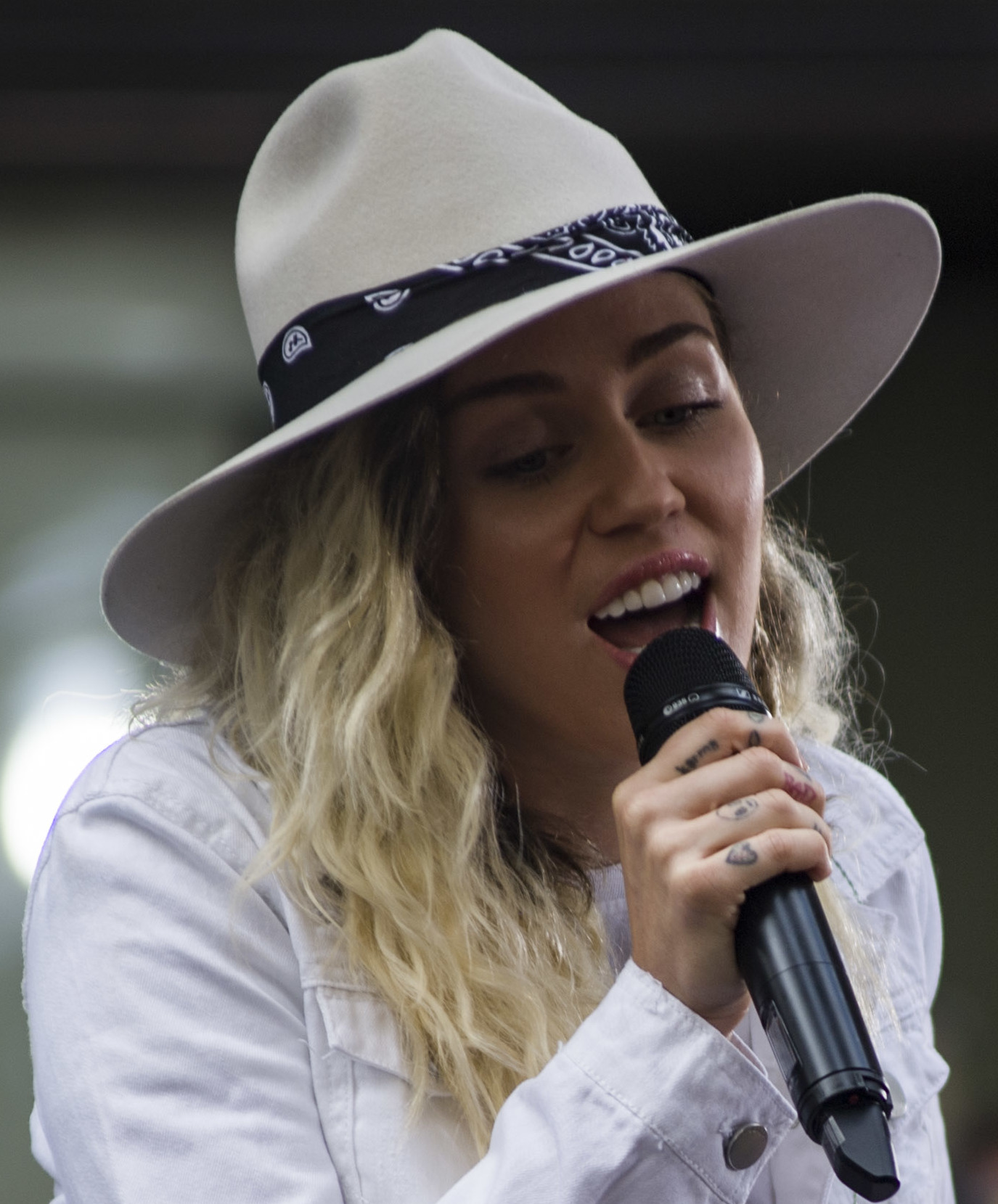
Miley Cyrus

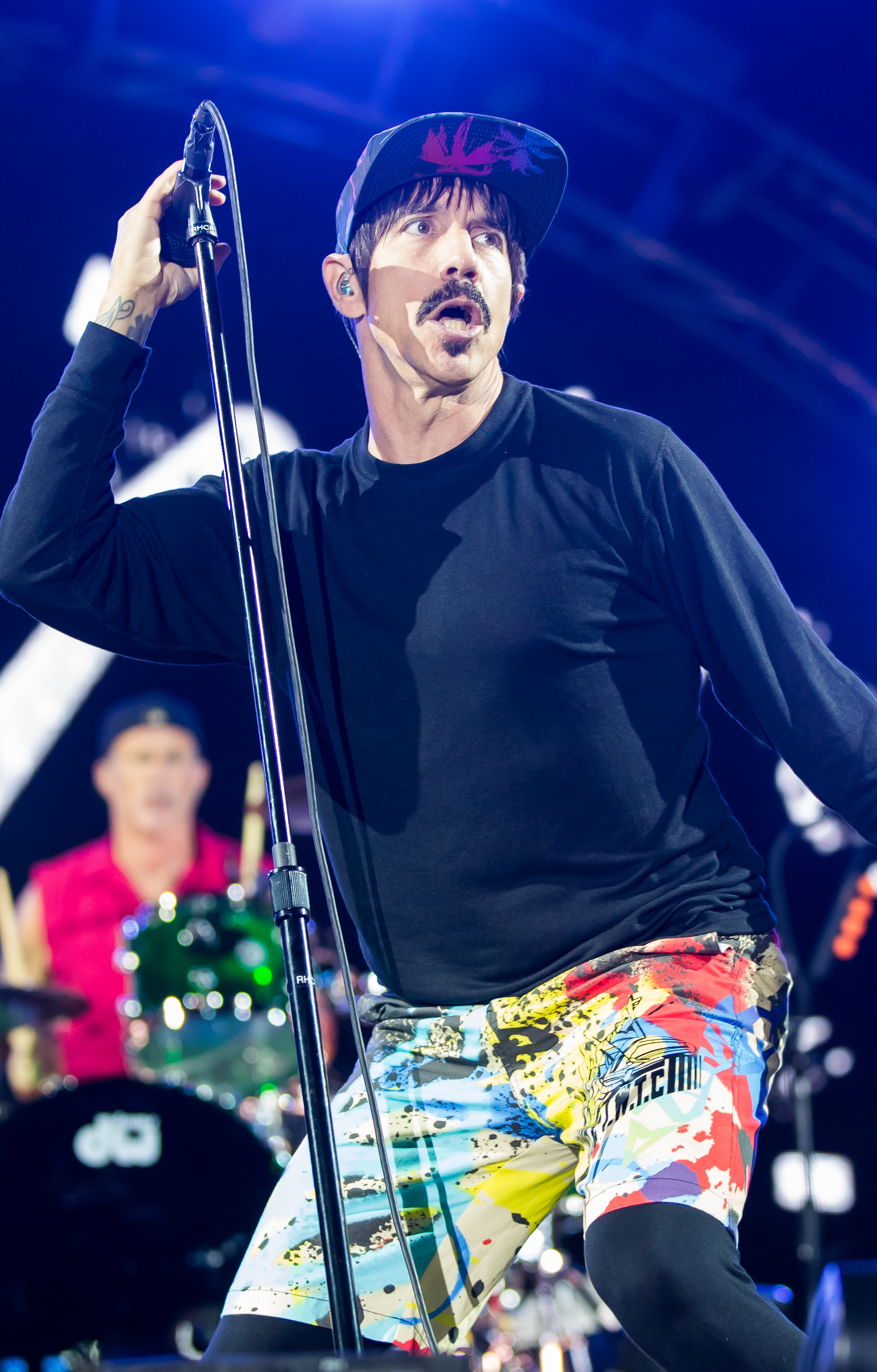
Anthony Kiedis

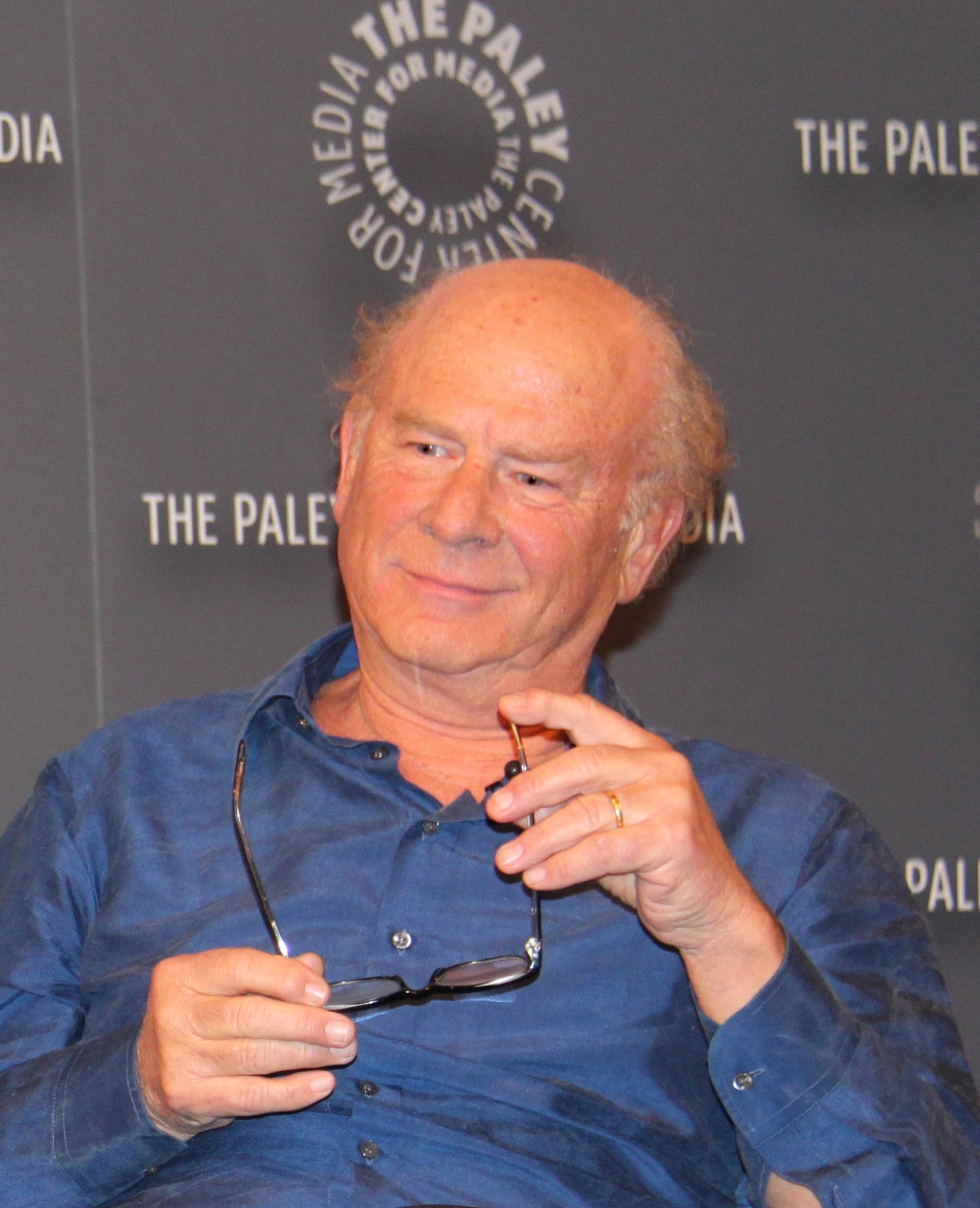
Art Garfunkel

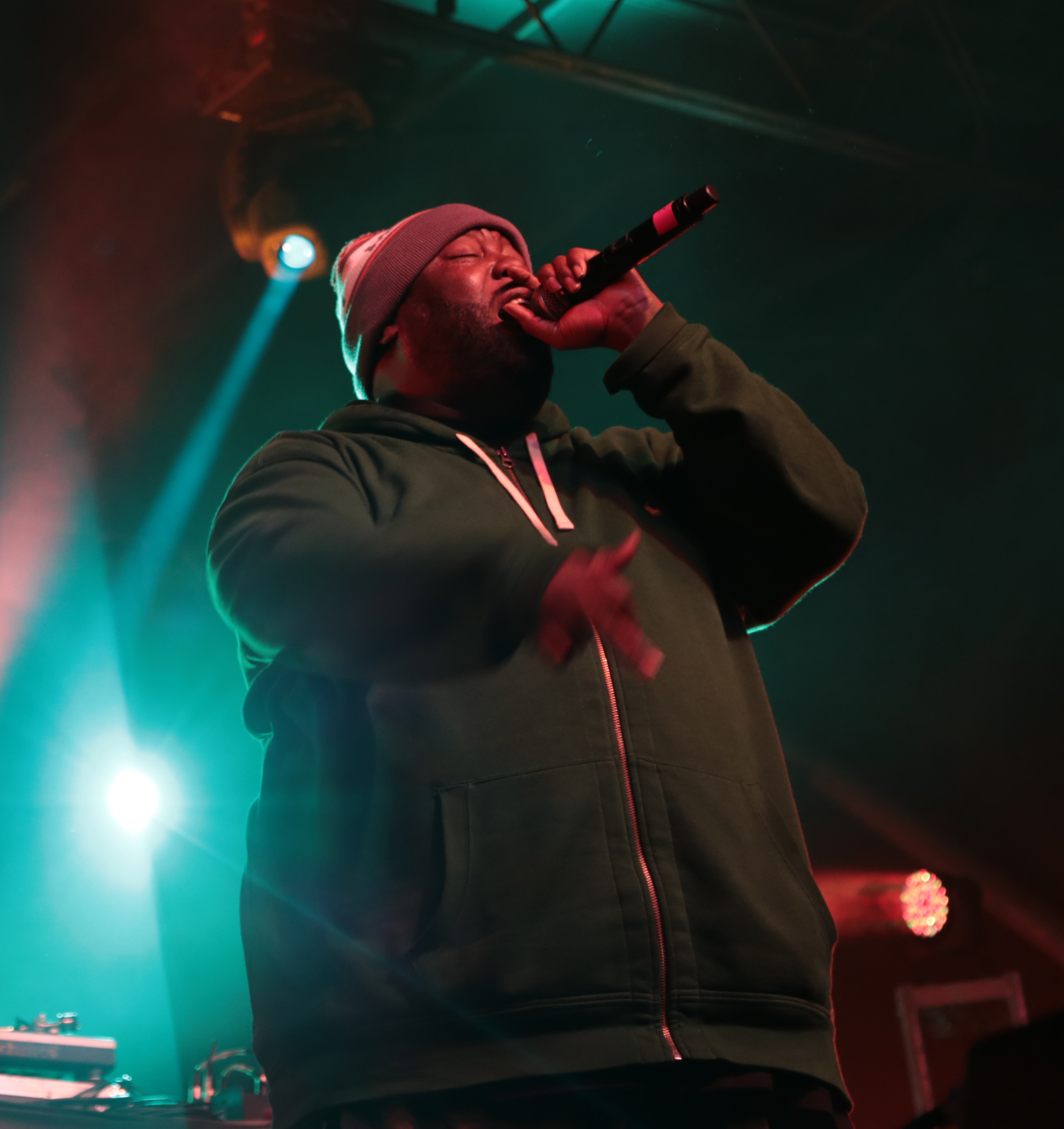
Killer Mike

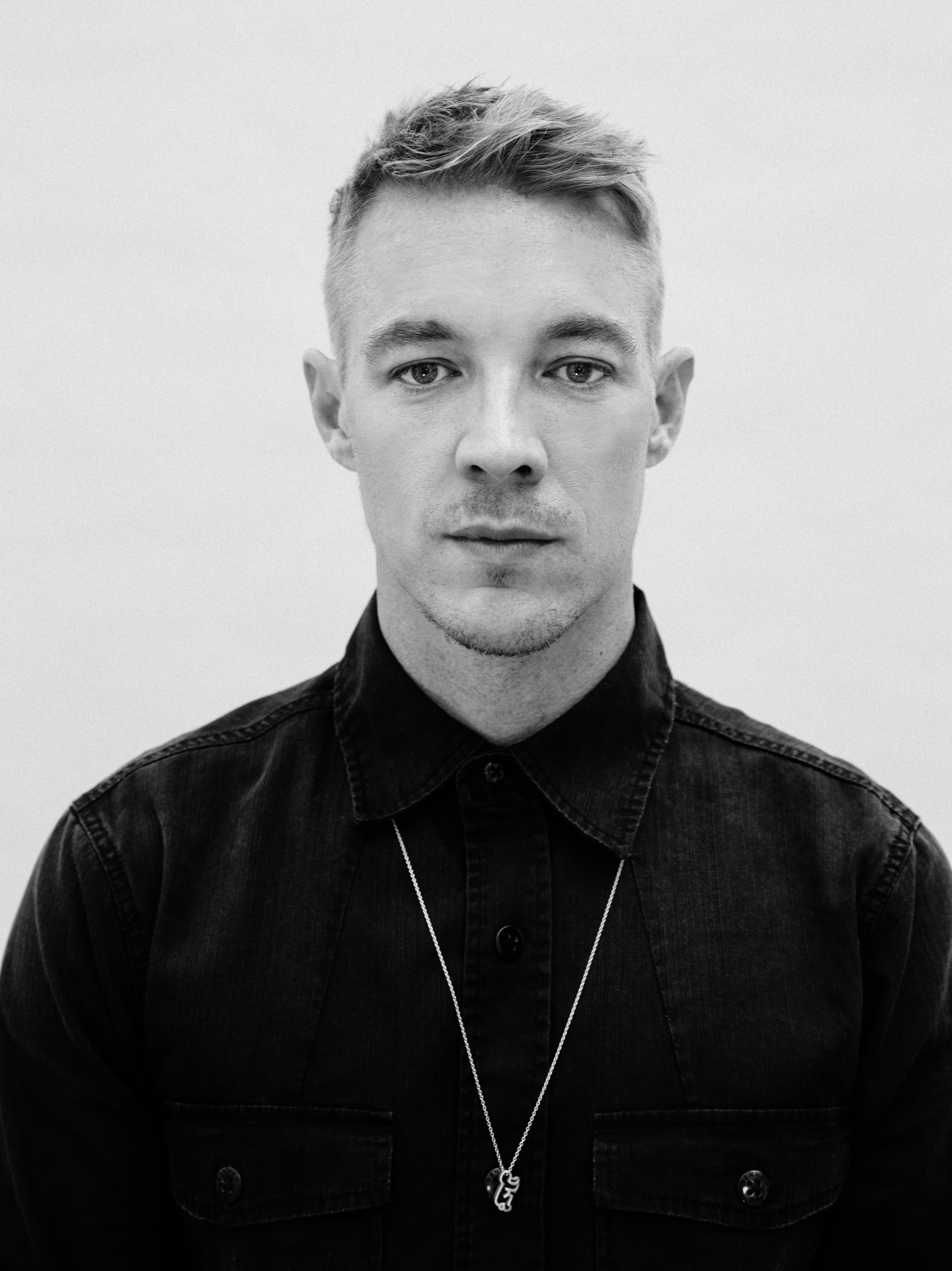
Diplo

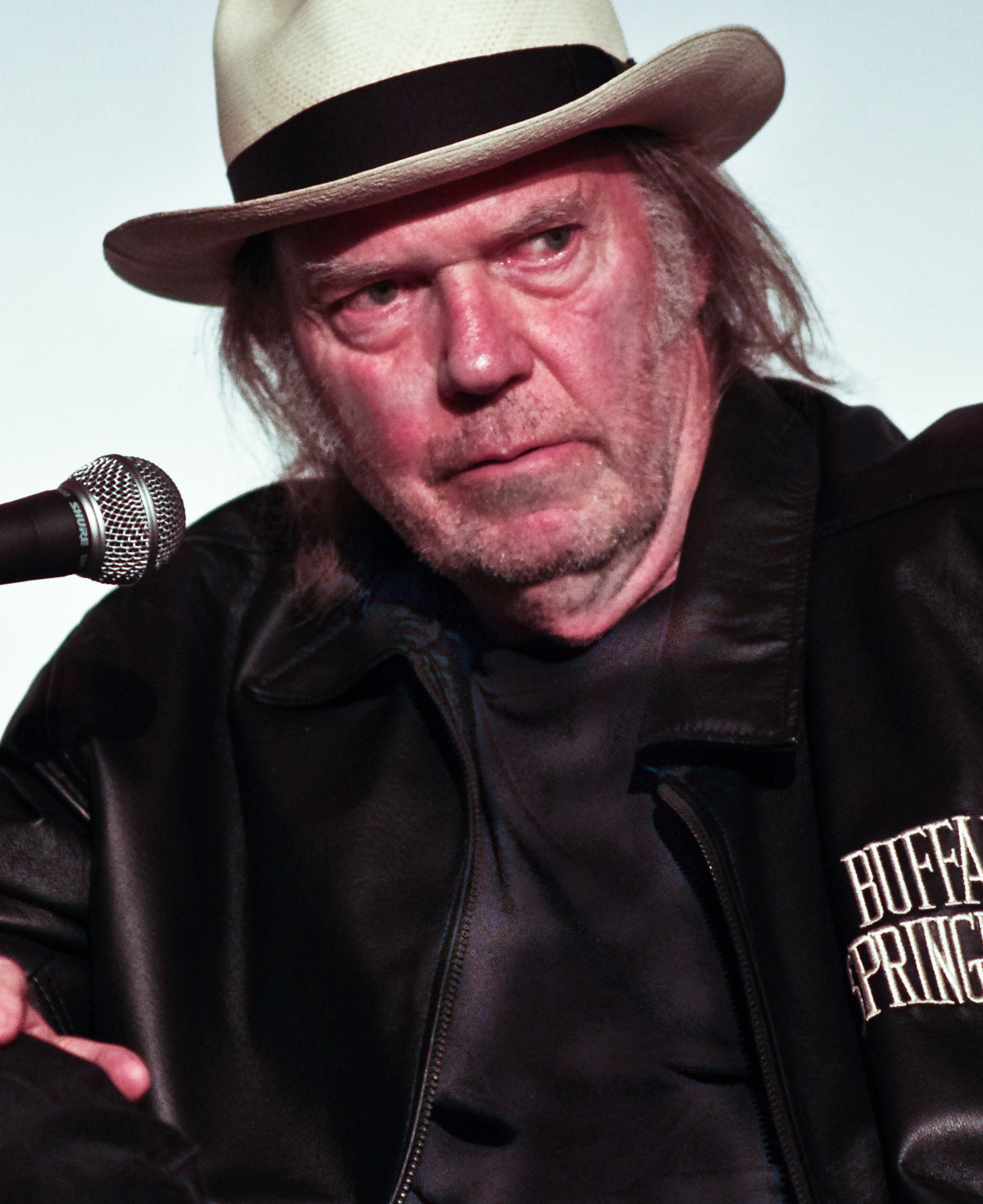
Neil Young

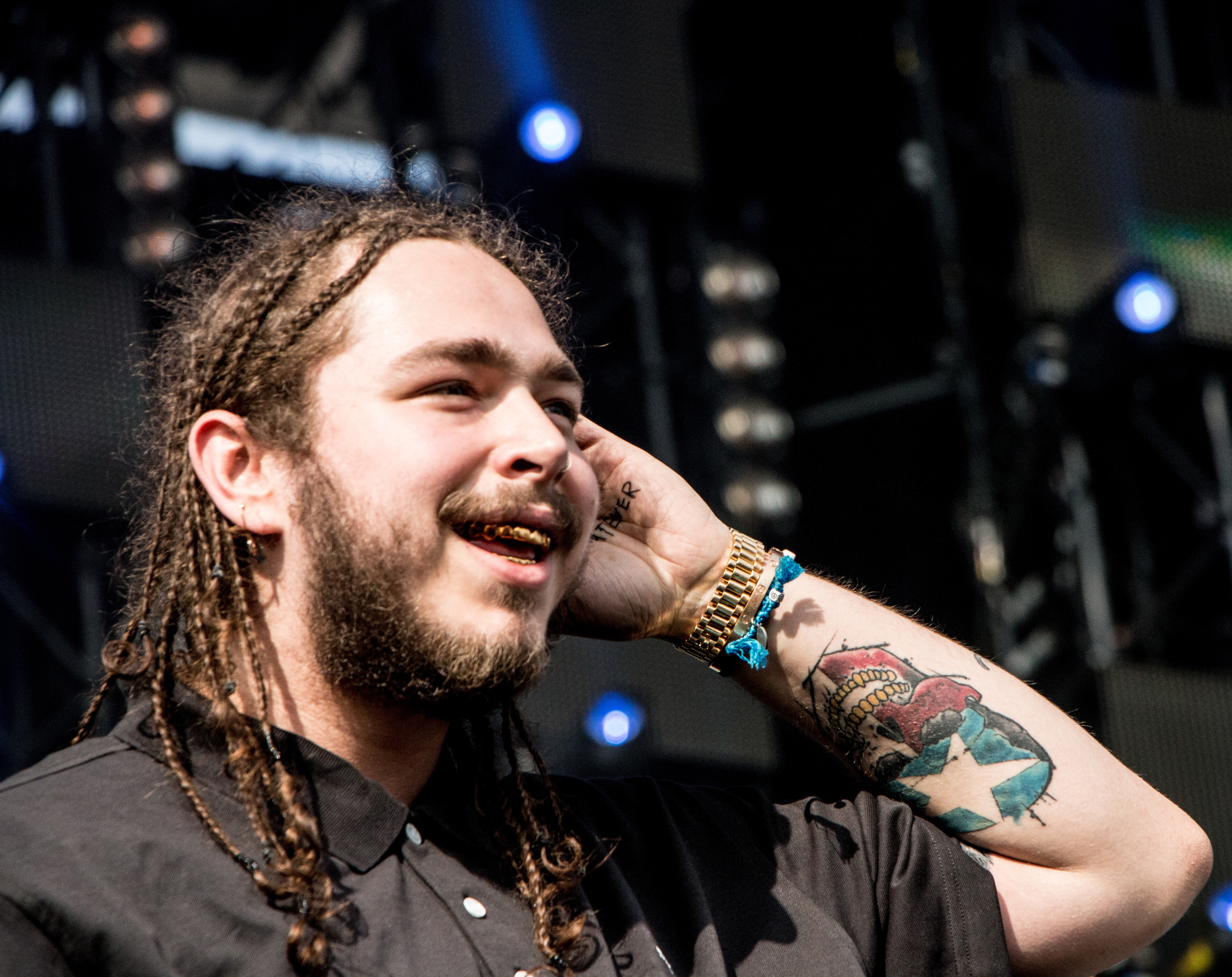
Post Malone

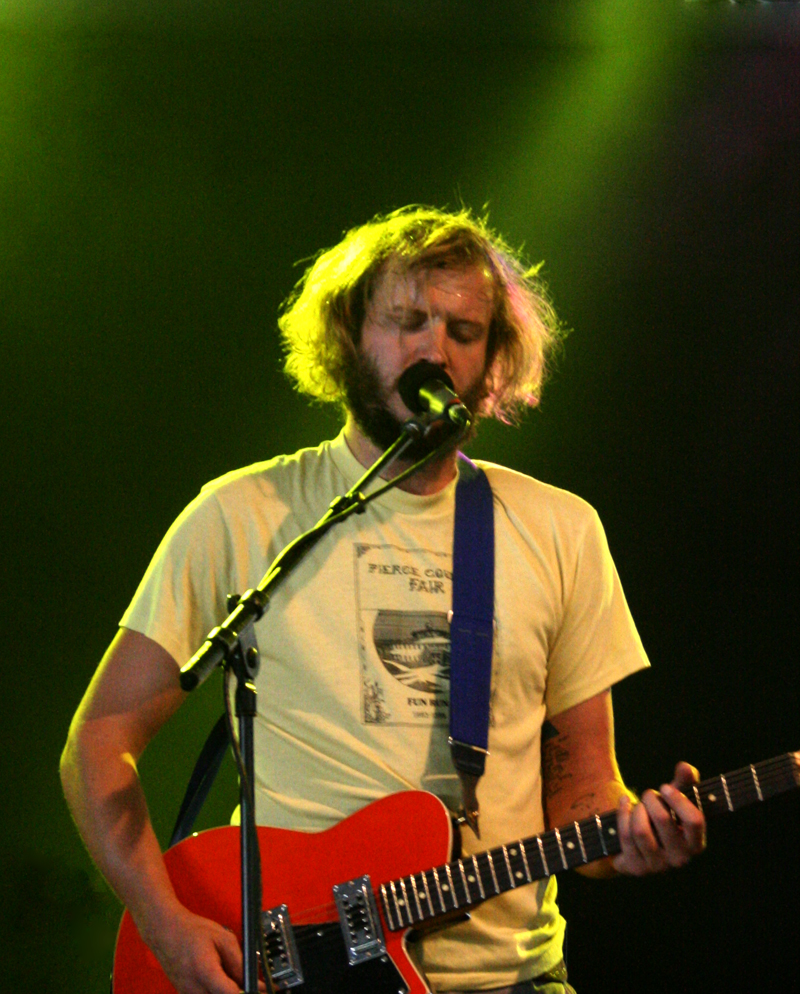
Justin Vernon

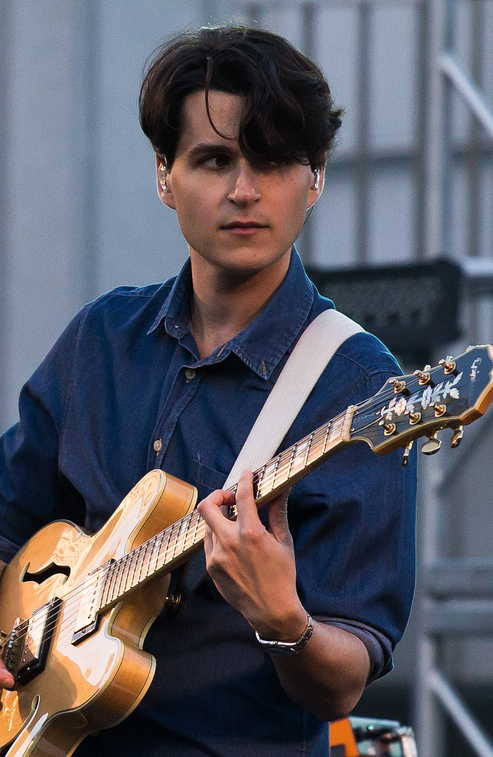
Ezra Koenig

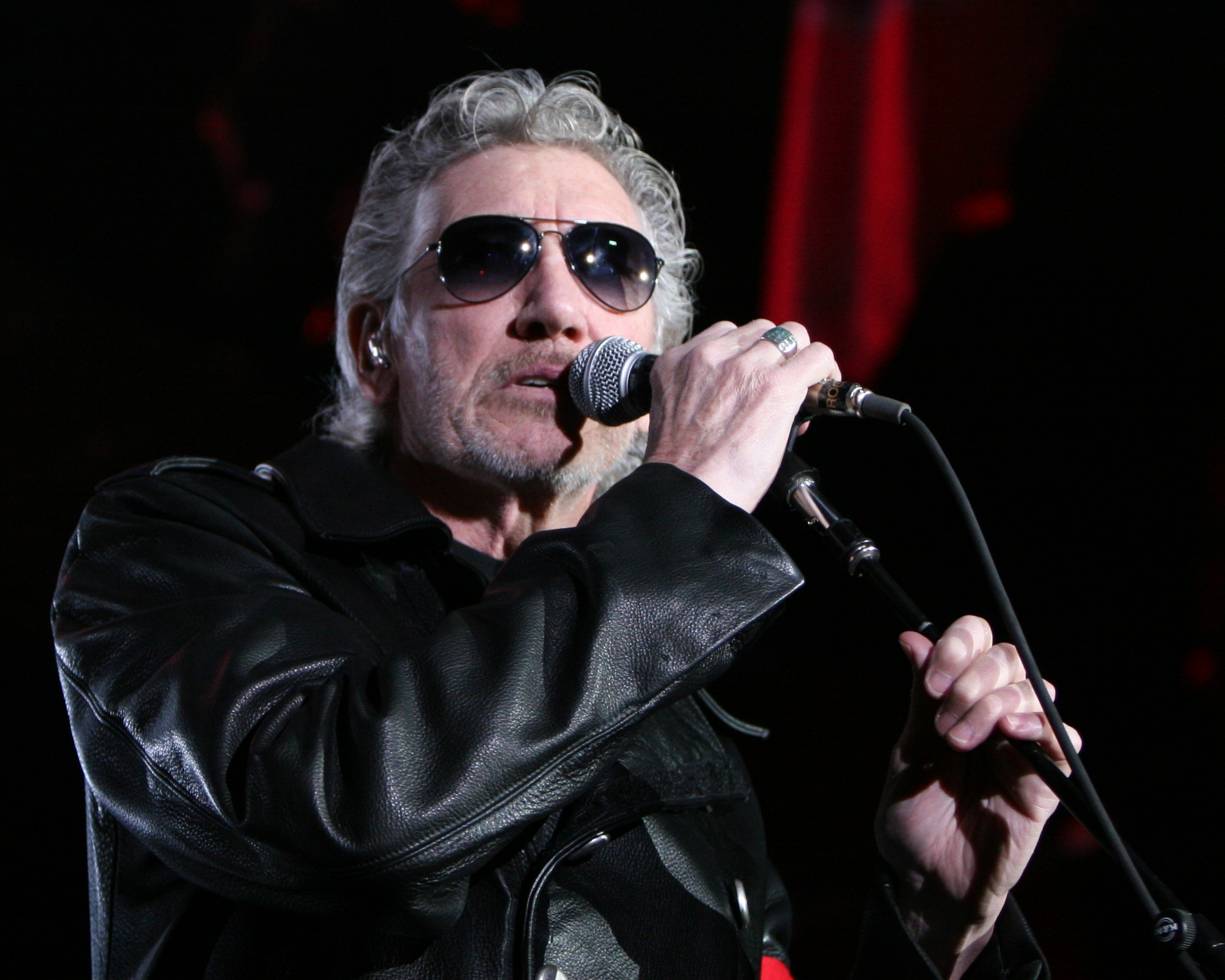
Roger Waters

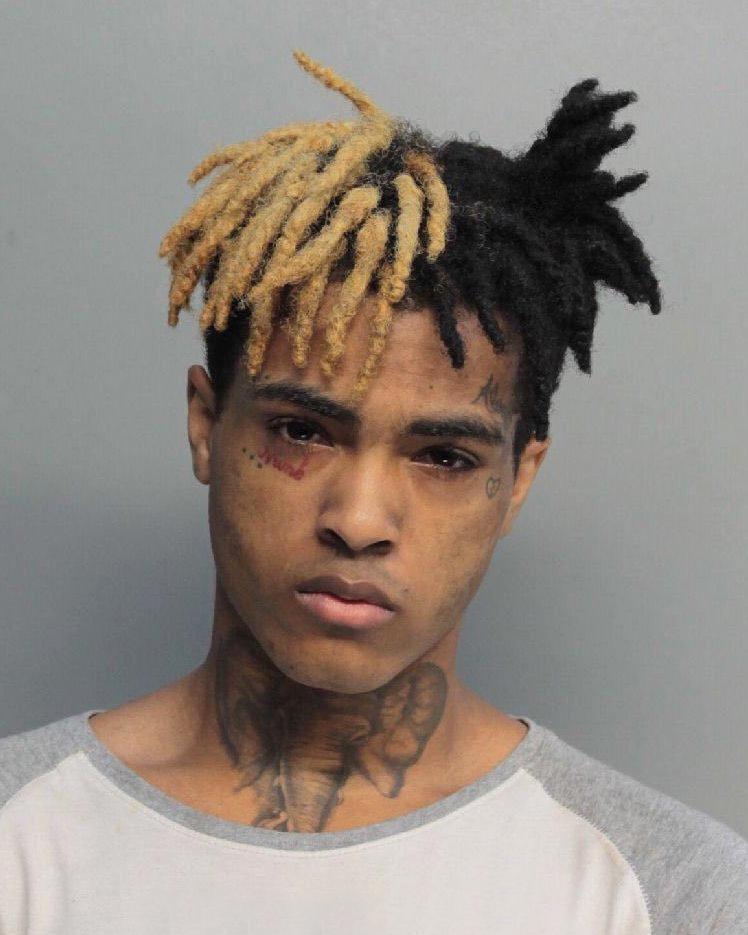
XXXTentacion

- 100 gecs, band
- All Shall Perish, band
- Hoodie Allen, independent hip-hop artist
- Steve Aoki, DJ and producer
- Moses Archuleta, Deerhunter co-founder
- Billie Joe Armstrong, Green Day frontman
- Joan Baez, singer-songwriter and musician
- Brian Baker, Bad Religion guitarist
- Chris Ballew, The Presidents of the United States of America lead singer
- David Banner, rapper
- Lou Barlow, Sebadoh guitarist and singer
- Bassnectar, DJ and producer
- Gerry Beckley, America guitarist and singer
- Harry Belafonte, singer and activist
- Jay Bentley, Bad Religion bass player
- Best Coast, duo
- Bhi Bhiman, singer–songwriter
- Jello Biafra, Dead Kennedys singer
- Big Boi, Outkast rapper
- Elvin Bishop, member of The Paul Butterfield Blues Band
- Cedric Bixler-Zavala, musician
- Billy Bragg, musician
- Olga Breeskin, violinist
- Sean Brennan, London After Midnight lead musician
- Nicholas Britell, pianist
- Brother Ali, rapper
- Chris Brown, singer and songwriter
- Jackson Browne, singer–songwriter
- Bun B, rapper
- Dewey Bunnell, America guitarist and singer
- Butterscotch, singer and beatboxer
- Dan "Soupy" Campbell, musician, lead vocalist and primary songwriter of pop-punk band The Wonder Years and indie-folk band Aaron West and the Roaring Twenties
- Richard Campbell, musician, singer–songwriter, and record producer
- Cardi B, rapper
- Belinda Carlisle, The Go-Go's lead singer
- Julian Casablancas, musician, The Strokes lead singer
- Tommy Castro, musician
- Cat Power, singer–songwriter and musician
- Matthew Caws, Nada Surf lead
- Chapin Sisters, duo
- Cold War Kids, band
- Joanna Connor, singer–songwriter and guitarist
- Frankie Cosmos, musician
- Marshall Crenshaw, musician
- David Crosby, musician
- Miley Cyrus, singer-songwriter and actress
- Bob D'Amico, Sebadoh drummer
- Dead Heavens, band
- John Densmore, The Doors drummer
- Kevin Devine, songwriter and musician
- Ani DiFranco, musician and songwriter
- Diplo, DJ and producer
- Johnny Dowd, musician
- David Draiman, Disturbed lead singer
- Joe Driscoll, rapper
- Ed Droste, Grizzly Bear singer
- Greg Dulli, Afghan Whigs singer
- William DuVall, Alice in Chains singer and guitarist
- Steve Earle, singer–songwriter
- Alex Ebert, Ima Robot and Edward Sharpe and the Magnetic Zeros lead singer
- El-P, half of Run the Jewels
- Emperor X, musical project
- EPMD, hip hop group
- Alejandro Escovedo, singer–songwriter
- Extra Action, marching band
- Fat Tony, rapper
- FDA Music, rapper
- Jon Fishman, Phish drummer
- Flea, musician, Red Hot Chili Peppers bassist
- Ben Folds, singer-songwriter and record producer
- Mark Foster, Foster the People lead singer
- Foster the People, band
- Nikolai Fraiture, musician, The Strokes bass player
- Freeway, rapper
- Kinky Friedman, singer–songwriter
- Bill Frisell, guitarist
- G-Eazy, rapper
- Gang Gang Dance, band
- Art Garfunkel, singer, poet, actor
- Mike Gordon, Phish bassist and singer
- Billy Gould, Faith No More bassist
- Mark "Barney" Greenway
- Grimes, singer, songwriter, music video director, and record producer
- Kristen Gundred, Dum Dum Girls singer
- Lzzy Hale, lead singer and guitarist of Halestorm
- Halsey, singer–songwriter
- Albert Hammond, Jr., guitarist for The Strokes and solo artist
- Kay Hanley, Letters to Cleo singer
- Darren Hayes, singer–songwriter
- Joe Henry, singer-songwriter
- Maureen Herman, Babes in Toyland bassist
- Holychild, band
- Jana Hunter, Lower Dens lead singer
- Eugene Hütz, Gogol Bordello lead singer
- Scott Ian, Anthrax guitarist
- Brad Jones, singer–songwriter
- JR JR, band
- Lisa Kekaula, The Bellrays lead singer
- Anthony Kiedis, Red Hot Chili Peppers singer
- Killer Mike, half of Run the Jewels
- Nate Kinsella, musician
- Tim Kinsella, Joan of Arc and Owls lead
- Josh Klinghoffer, Red Hot Chili Peppers guitarist
- Ezra Koenig, Vampire Weekend lead singer and guitarist
- Wayne Kramer, MC5 guitarist
- Damian Kulash, OK Go lead singer and guitarist
- Sean Lennon, singer and musician
- Jenny Lewis, singer-songwriter, musician, and actress
- Michelle Lewis, singer–songwriter
- Lil B, rapper
- Lil Yachty, rapper
- Dua Lipa, singer
- Lissie, singer–songwriter
- Jason Loewenstein, Sebadoh multi-instrumentalist
- David Longstreth, Dirty Projectors lead singer and guitarist
- Consuelo Luz, singer
- Jesse Malin, singer–songwriter
- Jonathan Mann, singer–songwriter
- Jono Manson, singer–songwriter and musician
- Misha Mansoor
- Dave Matthews, Dave Matthews Band lead
- Zia McCabe, musician
- Cass McCombs, singer–songwriter
- Nellie McKay, singer-songwriter and actress
- Justin Meldal-Johnsen, musician
- Ryan Miller, Guster lead
- Anaïs Mitchell, singer–songwriter
- Thurston Moore, Sonic Youth singer and guitarist
- Morrissey, The Smiths frontman, songwriter, and author
- Charlie Musselwhite, musician
- Nas, hip-hop artist
- Graham Nash, singer–songwriter
- Meshell Ndegeocello, singer–songwriter
- Will Noon, Straylight Run drummer
- Paul Oakenfold, DJ and producer
- Joff Oddie, Wolf Alice guitarist
- Ozomatli, band
- Amanda Palmer, singer–songwriter
- Holly Palmer, singer–songwriter
- Pants Velour, musical group
- Van Dyke Parks, musician
- Lourdes Pérez, Puerto Rican singer-songwriter
- Christina Perri, singer
- Lucian Piane, composer
- Quavo, rapper
- Joel Rafael, singer–songwriter
- Raffi, singer–songwriter
- Bonnie Raitt, singer–songwriter and guitarist
- Nathaniel Rateliff, singer–songwriter
- Red Hot Chili Peppers, rock band
- Residente, Calle 13 founder and rapper
- Duke Robillard, musician
- Henry Rollins, musician and activist
- Nate Ruess, Fun. singer and songwriter
- Matthew Ryan, musician
- Gabe Saporta, Cobra Starship lead singer
- Joe Satriani, musician
- Scarface, rapper
- Chris Schlarb, musician
- Walter Schreifels, musician
- Peggy Seeger, singer and musician
- Shana Falana, band
- Will Sheff, Okkervil River lead singer
- Chris Shiflett, Foo Fighters guitarist
- Corky Siegel, singer–songwriter
- Yung Skeeter, DJ and producer
- Chad Smith, Red Hot Chili Peppers drummer
- Smoke DZA, rapper
- Snatam Kaur, singer-songwriter
- Jill Sobule, musician
- Sam Sparro, singer–songwriter
- Spirit Family Reunion, band
- Spose, rapper
- Rae Sremmurd
- Tanya Stephens, reggae artist
- Michael Stipe, R.E.M. singer and songwriter
- STNNNG, band
- Styles P, The Lox rapper
- Tommie Sunshine, DJ and producer
- T.I., rapper
- Serj Tankian, System of a Down singer
- Corey Taylor, Slipknot, Stone Sour lead
- Donnette Thayer, Game Theory guitarist
- Ian Thomas, singer
- Tennessee Thomas, musician and actress
- Chris Tomson, Vampire Weekend drummer
- TV on the Radio, indie rock band
- Jeff Tweedy, Wilco lead
- Tyler, the Creator, Odd Future co-founder
- Justin Vernon, Bon Iver founder
- Loudon Wainwright III, singer–songwriter
- Roger Waters, Pink Floyd co-founder
- Dusty Watson, The Sonics drummer
- Mike Watt, Minutemen co-founder
- Reggie Watts, musician
- Lucinda Williams, singer–songwriter
- Saul Williams, rapper and actor
- Yoni Wolf, Anticon co-founder
- XXXTentacion, rapper, singer, and songwriter
- Neil Young, singer–songwriter
- Mas Ysa, composer and visual artist
- Z-Trip, DJ and producer
- Zedd, DJ and producer
- Hans Zimmer, composer
- Buckwheat Zydeco, musician

=== Newspapers and other media ===
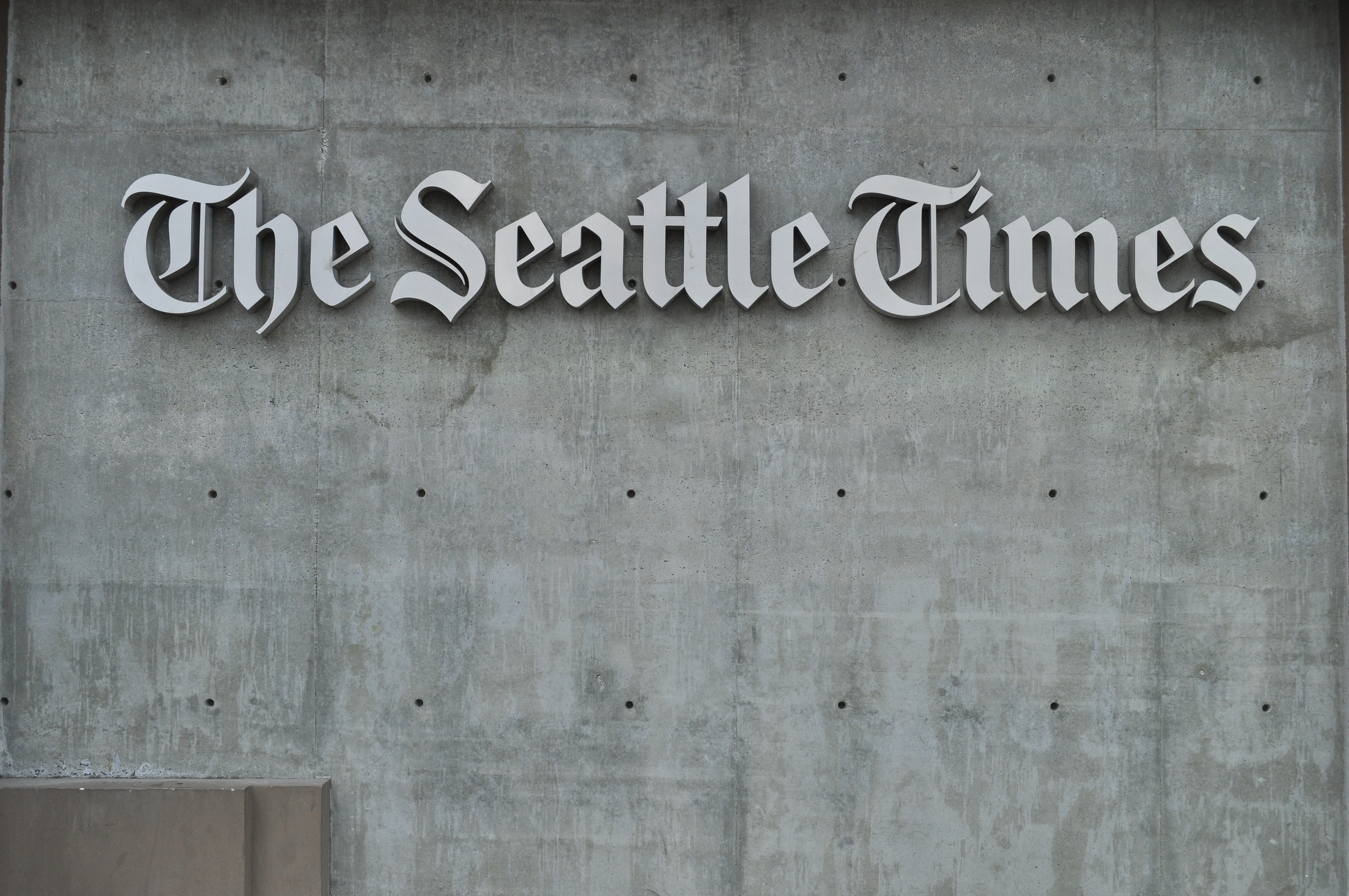
The Seattle Times

- Addison County Independent, Middlebury, Vermont
- The Arab American News, Dearborn, Michigan
- Daily Hampshire Gazette, Northampton, Massachusetts
- The Daily Iowan, Iowa City, Iowa
- The Daily Nonpareil, Council Bluffs, Iowa
- East Bay Express, Oakland, California
- The Nation, New York City, New York
- Philadelphia Tribune, Philadelphia, Pennsylvania
- The Portland Mercury, Portland, Oregon
- Quad-City Times, Davenport, Iowa
- The Recorder, Greenfield, Massachusetts
- Ring of Fire, radio program
- San Francisco Bay Guardian, San Francisco, California
- The San Francisco Examiner, San Francisco, California
- The Seattle Times, Seattle, Washington
- Seattle Weekly, Seattle, Washington
- The Stranger, Seattle, Washington
- Willamette Week, Portland, Oregon

=== Labor organizations ===
==== National ====
- APWU – American Postal Workers Union, representing 250,000
- ATU – Amalgamated Transit Union, representing 190,000
- CWA – Communication Workers of America, representing 700,000
- ILWU – International Longshore and Warehouse Union, representing 50,000
- NNU - National Nurses United, representing 150,000
- NUHW – National Union of Healthcare Workers, representing 15,000
- UE – United Electrical, Radio and Machine Workers of America, representing 35,900

==== State, regional, and local divisions ====
- AFGE – American Federation of Government Employees: National Union for Social Security Workers (Council 220)
- AFL-CIO – American Federation of Labor and Congress of Industrial Organizations: VT, SC
- AFSCME – American Federation of State, County and Municipal Employees: WA, WI and Locals 2724, 2057, and 25 (MI)
- AFT – American Federation of Teachers: Locals 1474, 1931, 1966, 1990, 2023, 2034, 2141, 2199, 2226, and 6366 (CA)
- CTU – Chicago Teachers Union: Caucus Of Rank-and-file Educators (CORE)
- IAIW – International Association of Bridge, Structural, Ornamental and Reinforcing Iron Workers: Local 7 (MA)
- IBEW – International Brotherhood of Electrical Workers: Locals 2222, 2304, 2313, 2320, 2321, 2322, 2323, 2324, 2325, 2326, 2327, 159, 357, 440, 490, 776, 1837, 1228, 113 and 1634 (MA, RI, CA, ME, VT, NH, NV, SC, WI, CO, IA)
- IBT – International Brotherhood of Teamsters: Local One-L, Pennsylvania Federation Brotherhood of Maintenance of Way Employes Division
- IFPTE – International Federation of Professional and Technical Engineers: Local 70 (DC)
- NEA – National Education Association: VT
- PASNAP – Pennsylvania Association of Staff Nurses and Allied Professionals
- SEIU – Service Employees International Union: Locals 560 and 1984 (NH)
- TWU – Transport Workers Union of America: Local 100
- UBC – United Brotherhood of Carpenters: Locals 1503 (OR)
- UFCW – United Food and Commercial Workers International Union: Local 5 (CA)
- UH – UNITE HERE: NY, CT, RI, MA, VT, NH, ME, and Locals 2, 30, 49, 54, and 2850 (CA, NJ)
- USW – United Steelworkers: Local 310, 1999, 2003 (IA, IN)
- UURWAW – United Union of Roofers, Waterproofers and Allied Workers: Local 36 (CA)

=== Organizations ===
MoveOn.org

Friends of the Earth

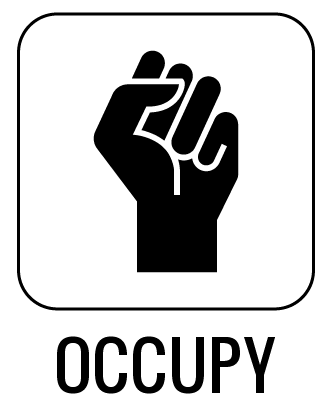
Occupy Wall Street

- Agenda Project
- Americans for Democratic Action
- Armenian National Committee of America, Western Region
- Climate Hawks Vote
- Democracy for America
- Democratic Socialists of America (then a member of the Socialist International)
- Friends of the Earth
- Green Party of Oklahoma
- Harvey Milk LGBT Democratic Club
- Iowa Citizens for Community Improvement Action Fund
- Jim Owles Liberal Democratic Club
- Justice Party
- MoveOn.org
- National People's Action
- Occupy Wall Street
- Oregon Progressive Party
- Organic Consumers Association
- Party for Socialism and Liberation
- Peace Action
- People Before Profit
- Progressive Democrats of America
- Robin Hood Tax
- Social Democrats, USA
- Socialist Alternative (member of the Committee for a Workers' International)
- USAction, NY Chapter
- Vermont Progressive Party
- Working Families Party

== See also ==
- List of Donald Trump presidential campaign endorsements, 2016
- List of Gary Johnson presidential campaign endorsements, 2016
- List of Hillary Clinton presidential campaign political endorsements, 2016
- List of Hillary Clinton presidential campaign non-political endorsements, 2016
- List of Jill Stein presidential campaign endorsements, 2016
- List of Bernie Sanders presidential campaign endorsements, 2020
