= 2018 United States Senate election in Texas =

- November 6, 2018
- Turnout: 53.01% ▼ (of registered voters); 42.07% ▼ (of voting age population)
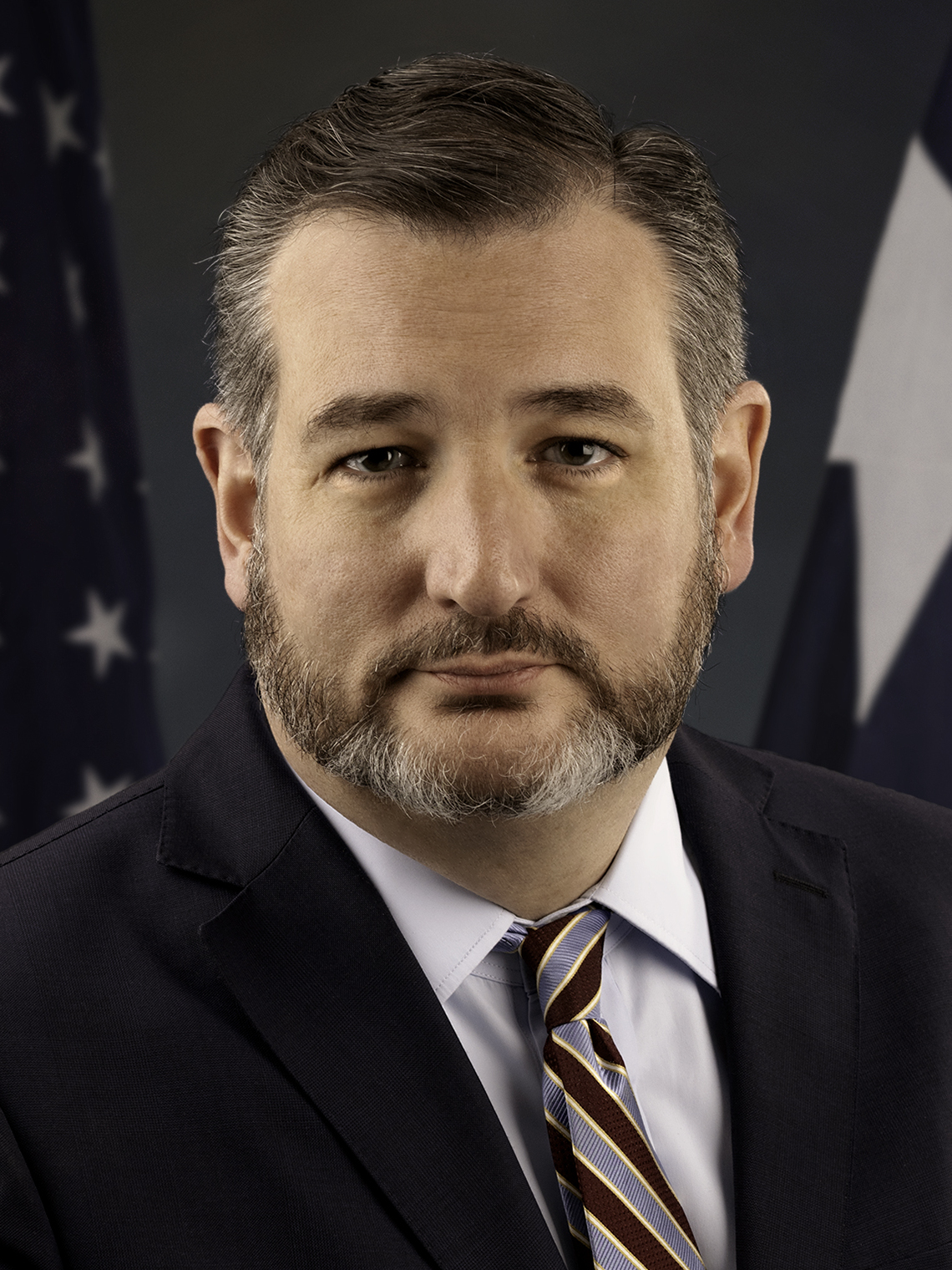

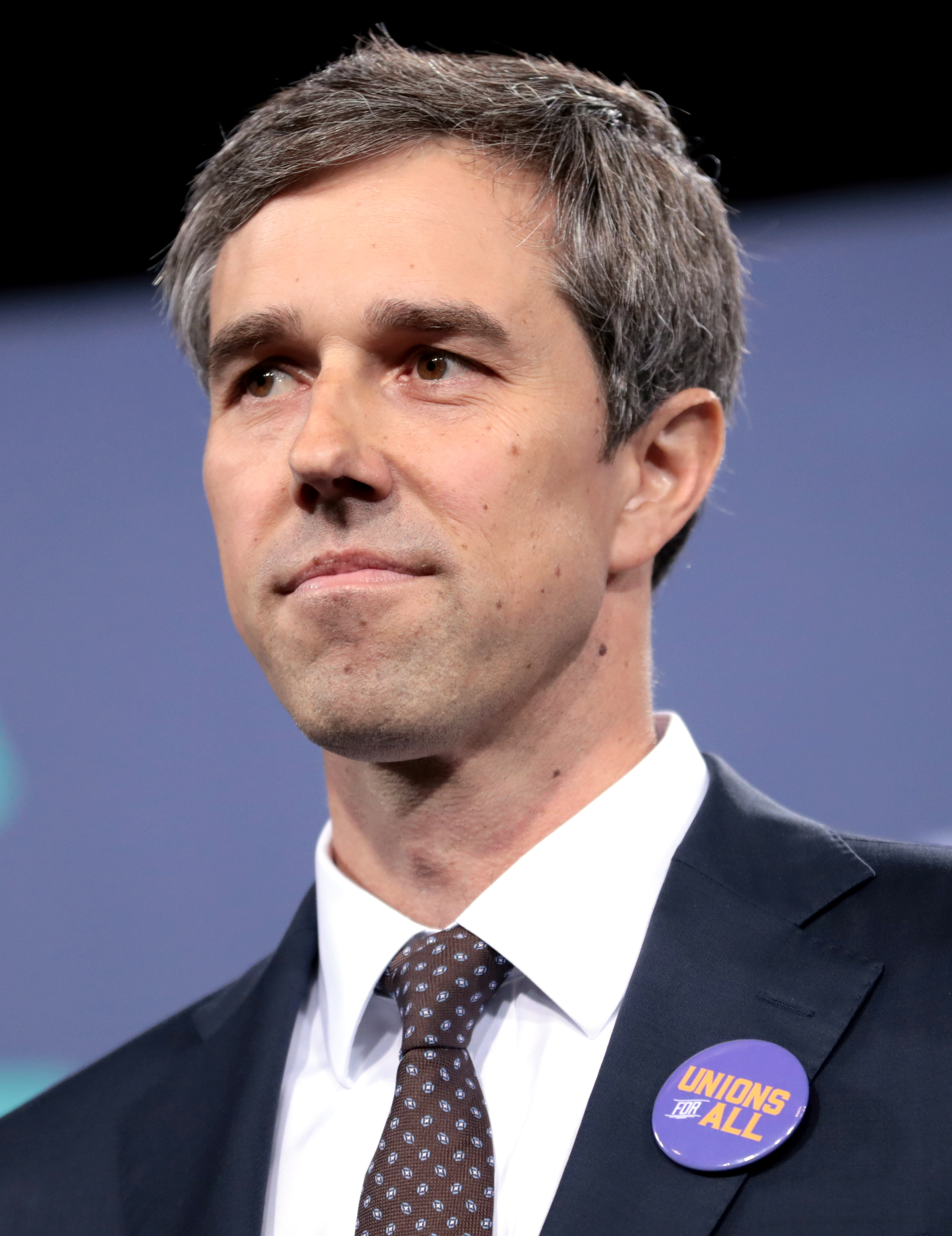
Nominee	Ted Cruz	Beto O'Rourke
Party	Republican	Democratic
Popular vote	4,260,553	4,045,632
Percentage	50.89%	48.33%
- Cruz: 40–50% 50–60% 60–70% 70–80% 80–90% >90% O'Rourke: 40–50% 50–60% 60–70% 70–80% 80–90% >90% Tie: 40–50% 50% No data
U.S. senator before election
Ted Cruz
Republican
Elected U.S. senator
Ted Cruz
Republican

The 2018 United States Senate election in Texas was held on November 6, 2018, to elect a member of the United States Senate to represent the state of Texas. Republican incumbent Ted Cruz won re-election to a second term, defeating Democratic Congressman Beto O'Rourke. The primary was held on March 6, 2018, the first primary of the 2018 season.

No Democrat had won a general election for statewide office in Texas since Bob Bullock was reelected as lieutenant governor in 1994, with election forecasters declaring it a safe Republican seat at the beginning of the 2018 cycle. However, O'Rourke gradually closed the gap. Leading up to the election, the race was considered unexpectedly competitive.

On Election Day, Cruz defeated O'Rourke by a margin of just under 215,000 votes, or 2.6 percent; this was the closest U.S. Senate race in Texas since 1978.

== Background ==
In 2012, after a stunning upset victory in the Republican primary, then-Solicitor General of Texas Ted Cruz defeated former member of the Texas House of Representatives Paul Sadler by a 16-point margin (56%–40%). Texas has not elected a Democratic senator since 1988. As conservatives began turning to the Republican Party in once strongly Democratic areas, Democratic voters in the state were largely based in the majority-Hispanic communities in Southern Texas and in populous metropolitan cities, such as Houston, Austin, San Antonio, and Dallas, as well as the heavily Hispanic city of El Paso on the state's western tip, which O'Rourke represented in the U.S. House.

Since 1990, Texas has voted for Republican statewide candidates in nearly all elections, whether it be presidential, gubernatorial, or senatorial, often by large margins. In 1998, Governor George W. Bush won re-election by 37 points over his Democratic challenger, Garry Mauro. In 2000, Governor Bush won Texas by 21 points over Vice President Al Gore. In 2004, President Bush won Texas over Senator John Kerry by 23 points, winning rural areas by landslide margins, capturing urban zones, and coming very close to winning the Latino vote (49% to Kerry's 50%). Democrat Barack Obama lost by 7.27 percentage points in 2008 against John McCain, and 15.8 points in 2012, against Mitt Romney, respectively. In 2016, Donald Trump defeated Democrat Hillary Clinton by a 9-point margin, demonstrating a possible shift away from the Safe Republican status it had held for over a decade. This has led Democrats to begin targeting Texas as a potential future swing state. It should also be noted that Ted Cruz defeated Donald Trump in the Texas Republican primary for U.S. president in 2016.

As of June 2018, Senator Cruz held a 49%–44% approval rating among Texans in a state Donald Trump won by 9 points against Hillary Clinton in 2016. Among groups that tend to affiliate themselves more with the Democratic Party, Senator Cruz held a 29% approval rating among Hispanics, 37% among women, and 42% among college-educated voters.

== Republican primary ==
=== Candidates ===
==== Nominee ====
- Ted Cruz, incumbent U.S. senator and former candidate for president in 2016

==== Eliminated in primary ====
- Stefano de Stefano, attorney
- Bruce Jacobson, television producer
- Mary Miller, CPA
- Geraldine Sam, former mayor of La Marque

==== Failed to qualify ====
- Thomas Dillingham, businessman

==== Withdrew ====
- Dan McQueen, former mayor of Corpus Christi

==== Declined ====
- George P. Bush, Texas land commissioner and grandson of former President George H. W. Bush (ran for re-election)
- Michael McCaul, U.S. representative from Texas's 10th congressional district (ran for re-election)
- Dan Patrick, lieutenant governor of Texas (ran for re-election)
- Rick Perry, secretary of energy, former governor of Texas and candidate for president in 2012 and 2016
- Katrina Pierson, national spokesperson for the Donald Trump's presidential campaign in 2016 and candidate for House district TX-32 in 2014

=== Endorsements ===
Bruce Jacobson

Individuals

- Dan McQueen, former mayor of Corpus Christi and former candidate for this seat
Stefano de Stefano

Newspapers

- The Bryan-College Station Eagle
- Corpus Christi Caller Times
- The Dallas Morning News

=== Polling ===
Poll source	Date(s) administered	Sample size	Margin of error	Ted Cruz	Stefano de Stefano	Bruce Jacobson	Mary Miller	Geraldine Sam	Undecided
Dixie Strategies	February 22–23, 2018	–	± 4.7%	73%	1%	2%	2%	1%	21%
University of Texas	February 1–12, 2018	612	± 5.3%	91%	1%	3%	3%	2%	–

Hypothetical polling

Poll source	Date(s) administered	Sample size	Margin of error	Ted Cruz	Michael McCaul	Other	Undecided
Dixie Strategies	September 29 – October 1, 2016	321	± 3.5%	52%	12%	7%	29%
Public Policy Polling	August 12–14, 2016	522	–	51%	19%	–	31%

Poll source	Date(s) administered	Sample size	Margin of error	Ted Cruz	George P. Bush	Other	Undecided
Dixie Strategies	August 8–9, 2016	448	–	40%	21%	12%	27%

Poll source	Date(s) administered	Sample size	Margin of error	Ted Cruz	Dan Patrick	Other	Undecided
Public Policy Polling	August 12–14, 2016	522	–	49%	27%	–	24%
Dixie Strategies	August 8–9, 2016	448	–	38%	23%	15%	24%

Poll source	Date(s) administered	Sample size	Margin of error	Ted Cruz	Rick Perry	Undecided
Public Policy Polling	August 12–14, 2016	522	–	37%	46%	18%

=== Results ===
County results of the Republican primary Cruz: Cruz—>90%; Cruz—80–90%; Cruz—70–80%; No votes

Republican primary results
Party	Candidate	Votes	%
Republican	Ted Cruz (incumbent)	1,322,724	85.36%
Republican	Mary Miller	94,715	6.11%
Republican	Bruce Jacobson Jr.	64,791	4.18%
Republican	Stefano de Stefano	44,456	2.87%
Republican	Geraldine Sam	22,887	1.48%
Total votes		1,549,573	100%

== Democratic primary ==
=== Candidates ===
==== Nominee ====
- Beto O'Rourke, U.S. representative from Texas's 16th congressional district

==== Eliminated in primary ====
- Sema Hernandez, activist and organizer for the Poor People's Campaign, baseball coach and small business owner
- Edward Kimbrough

==== Declined ====
- Joaquin Castro, U.S. representative from Texas's 20th congressional district (ran for re-election)
- Julian Castro, former U.S. secretary of housing and urban development and mayor of San Antonio
- Wendy Davis, former state senator and nominee for governor in 2014

=== Endorsements ===
Beto O'Rourke

Newspapers

- The Dallas Morning News
- Houston Chronicle

Organizations

- End Citizens United
- Equality Texas
- Houston GLBT Political Caucus
- J Street PAC
- League of Conservation Voters
- MoveOn.org Political Action
- National Education Association
- Stonewall Democrats of Dallas
- Stonewall Democrats of San Antonio
- Texas AFL-CIO
Sema Hernandez

Individuals

- Lee Camp, host of Redacted Tonight

=== Polling ===
Poll source	Date(s) administered	Sample size	Margin of error	Sema Hernandez	Edward Kimbrough	Beto O'Rourke	Undecided
Dixie Strategies	February 22–23, 2018	–	± 5.7%	6%	4%	38%	53%
University of Texas	February 1–12, 2018	453	± 7.4%	19%	8%	73%	–

=== Results ===
County results of the Democratic primary O'Rourke: O'Rourke—>90%; O'Rourke—80–90%; O'Rourke—70–80%; O'Rourke—60–70%; O'Rourke—50–60%; O'Rourke—40–50%; O'Rourke—<40%; Kimbrough / O'Rourke—50%; O'Rourke/Hernandez tie: O'Rourke/Hernandez tie—<50%; O'Rourke/Kimbrough tie: O'Rourke/Kimbrough tie—50%; Hernandez: Hernandez—>90%; Hernandez—80–90%; Hernandez—70–80%; Hernandez—60–70%; Hernandez—50–60%; Hernandez—40–50%; Hernandez—<40%; Kimbrough: Kimbrough—<40%; Kimbrough—40–50%; Kimbrough—50–60%; Kimbrough—60–70%; Kimbrough—70–80%; Kimbrough—80–90%; Kimbrough—>90%

Democratic primary results
Party	Candidate	Votes	%
Democratic	Beto O'Rourke	644,632	61.81%
Democratic	Sema Hernandez	247,424	23.72%
Democratic	Edward Kimbrough	150,858	14.47%
Total votes		1,042,914	100%

== Libertarian nomination ==
=== Candidates ===
==== Nominated ====
- Neal Dikeman, businessman

== General election ==
=== Predictions ===
Source	Ranking	As of
The Cook Political Report	Tossup	October 26, 2018
Inside Elections	Likely R	November 1, 2018
Sabato's Crystal Ball	Lean R	November 5, 2018
CNN	Lean R	October 5, 2018
RealClearPolitics	Lean R	November 5, 2018
Daily Kos	Lean R	October 5, 2018
Fox News (Note: The Fox News Midterm Power Rankings uniquely does not contain a category for Safe/Solid races)	Lean R	October 30, 2018

=== Debates ===
- Complete video of debate, September 21, 2018
- Complete video of debate, October 16, 2018

=== Endorsements ===
Ted Cruz (R)

U.S. executive branch officials

- Donald Trump, president of the United States (2017–present)

U.S. senators

- John Cornyn, Texas (2002–present)

State officials

- Greg Abbott, governor of Texas
- George P. Bush, land commissioner of Texas
- Wayne Christian, Texas railroad commissioner
- Ryan Sitton, Texas railroad commissioner

Texas state senators

- Konni Burton, state senator (10th district)
- Charles Perry, state senator (28th district)

Texas state representatives

- Cecil Bell Jr., state representative (3rd district)
- Jeff Leach, state representative (67th district)
- Matt Rinaldi, state representative (115th district)
- Jonathan Stickland, state representative (92nd district)
- Valoree Swanson, state representative (150th district)

Local officeholders

- Tracy Murphree, sheriff of Denton County since 2017 and former Texas Ranger

Individuals

- Diamond and Silk, social media personalities and political activists
- Joe Gamaldi, president of the Houston Police Officers Union (HPOU)
- Sean Hannity, conservative talk radio host and television host of Hannity on Fox News
- Ray Hunt, past HPOU president
- Laura Ingraham, television and radio talk show host
- Mark Levin, radio personality and author
- Donald Trump Jr., executive director of The Trump Organization and eldest child of President Donald Trump
- James Woods, actor

Labor unions

- San Antonio Police Officers Association

Organizations

- Campaign for Working Families
- Citizens Against Government Waste
- Club for Growth
- Empower Texans
- NRA Political Victory Fund
- Senate Conservatives Fund
- Tea Party Patriots
Beto O'Rourke (D)

U.S. executive branch officials

- John O. Brennan, 5th director of the Central Intelligence Agency (2013–2017)
- Julian Castro, 16th U.S. secretary of housing and urban development (2014–2017)

U.S. senators

- Cory Booker, U.S. senator from New Jersey
- Catherine Cortez Masto, U.S. senator from Nevada
- Dick Durbin, U.S. senator from Illinois and Senate minority whip
- Kirsten Gillibrand, U.S. senator from New York
- Kamala Harris, U.S. senator from California
- Maggie Hassan, U.S. senator from New Hampshire
- Chris Murphy, U.S. senator from Connecticut
- Patty Murray, U.S. senator from Washington
- Chuck Schumer, U.S. senator from New York and Senate minority leader
- Elizabeth Warren, U.S. senator from Massachusetts

U.S. representatives

- Joaquín Castro, U.S. representative (TX-20th district)
- Lloyd Doggett, U.S. representative (TX-35th district))
- Tulsi Gabbard, U.S. representative (HI-2nd district))
- Eddie Bernice Johnson, U.S. representative (TX-30th district)
- Joe Kennedy III, U.S. representative (MA-4th district)
- Ted Lieu, U.S. representative (CA-33rd district)
- Marc Veasey, U.S. representative (TX-33rd district)

Texas state senators

- Wendy Davis, former state senator (D-10th district) and 2014 Democratic nominee for governor of Texas

Texas state representatives

- Chris Turner, state representative (101st district) and chair of the Texas House Democratic Caucus

Local officeholders

- Lupe Valdez, former sheriff of Dallas County and 2018 Democratic nominee for governor of Texas
- Jenny Wilson, Salt Lake County councilwoman and candidate for U.S. Senate in Utah in 2018

Individuals

- Judd Apatow, film director
- Bun B, rapper
- Kevin Bacon, actor
- Leon Bridges, singer
- Connie Britton, actress
- Win Butler, musician
- Scott Campbell, executive director of Elton John AIDS Foundation
- Jim Carrey, actor and comedian
- Kevin Conroy, voice actor
- Ellen DeGeneres, comedian and television host
- Tate Donovan, actor and film director
- Anthony Fantano, music critic, video producer, journalist, and creator of The Needle Drop
- Jason Flom, chief executive officer of Lava Records
- Arian Foster, former NFL running back
- Vicente Fox, 55th president of Mexico
- Jim Gianopulos, chairman and chief executive officer of Paramount Pictures
- Shakey Graves, singer
- Jonathan Groff, actor and singer
- Jake Gyllenhaal, actor
- Chelsea Handler, comedian and actress
- Steve Hely, writer
- John Iadarola, host of The Young Turks
- LeBron James, NBA player
- Rian Johnson, film director
- Kelly Jones, ex-wife of Alex Jones
- Ana Kasparian, host of The Young Turks
- Stephen King, author
- Pat Klous, actress
- Beyoncé Knowles, singer
- John Leguizamo, actor
- Lawrence Lessig, academic, attorney, and political activist
- William Li, Ralph Lauren Corporation global brand president
- Eva Longoria, actress
- Phil Lord, film director
- Bill Maher, comedian and political commentator
- Stephanie March, actress
- Craig Mazin, screenwriter
- Alyssa Milano, actress and activist
- David Mixner, civil rights activist
- Willie Nelson, singer and activist
- Thao Nguyen, singer-songwriter
- Alexandria Ocasio-Cortez, Democratic nominee for New York's 14th congressional district
- Bob Odenkirk, actor
- Rosie O'Donnell, comedian and actress
- Richard Painter, University of Minnesota Twin Cities law professor, former George W. Bush White House ethics lawyer and candidate for the U.S. Senate in Minnesota in 2018
- David Pakman, political commentator
- Sarah Jessica Parker, actress
- Ron Perlman, actor
- Aubrey Plaza, actress
- Gregg Popovich, head coach of the San Antonio Spurs
- Alan Rosenberg, screen actor
- Rick Rosenthal, film producer
- Tom Rothman, chairman of Sony Pictures Entertainment Motion Picture Group
- Paul Rudd, actor
- Mark Ruffalo, actor
- Steve Schmidt, Republican political strategist, campaign manager of John McCain's 2008 presidential campaign
- Amy Schumer, actress
- Travis Scott, rapper
- Amy Siskind, activist and writer
- Nancy Stephens, actress
- Tara Strong, voice actress and activist
- Michael Urie, actor
- Cenk Uygur, host of The Young Turks
- Shea Whigham, actor
- Andrew White, businessman; son of former Texas Governor Mark White; candidate for the 2018 gubernatorial Democratic nomination

Labor unions

- American Federation of Government Employees
- National Education Association
- National Nurses United
- Texas Gulf Coast Area Labor Federation
- Texas State AFL-CIO
- Texas State Teachers Association
- TSAFF-Texas State Association of Firefighters
- United Automobile Workers

Organizations

- Council for a Livable World
- End Citizens United
- Equality Texas
- Feminist Majority Political Action Committee
- Houston LGBT Political Caucus
- Human Rights Campaign
- J Street
- Jolt Texas
- League of Conservation Voters Action Fund
- MoveOn.org
- NARAL Pro-Choice America
- National Organization for the Reform of Marijuana Laws PAC
- Our Revolution
- Population Connection
- Progress Texas
- Progressive Change Campaign Committee
- Sierra Club
- Stonewall Democrats of Dallas
- Stonewall Democrats of San Antonio

Newspapers

- The Austin Chronicle
- Corpus Christi Caller-Times
- Dallas Morning News
- El Paso Times
- Fort Worth Star-Telegram
- Houston Chronicle
- Longview News-Journal
- San Antonio Express-News

=== Fundraising ===
In the third quarter of 2018, O'Rourke raised $38.1 million. This was the largest quarterly total raised by a U.S. Senate candidate until Jaime Harrison raised $57 million in the third quarter of 2020 in the South Carolina election. Cruz and O'Rourke combined to raise a record-setting total of $126 million during the 2018 campaign.

Campaign finance reports as of December 31, 2018
Candidate (party)	Total receipts	Total disbursements	Cash on hand
Ted Cruz (R)	$45,668,718	$45,990,176	$157,959
Beto O'Rourke (D)	$80,344,836	$80,458,720	$284,816
Neal Dikeman (L)	$33,732	$33,398	$333
Source: Federal Election Commission

=== Polling ===
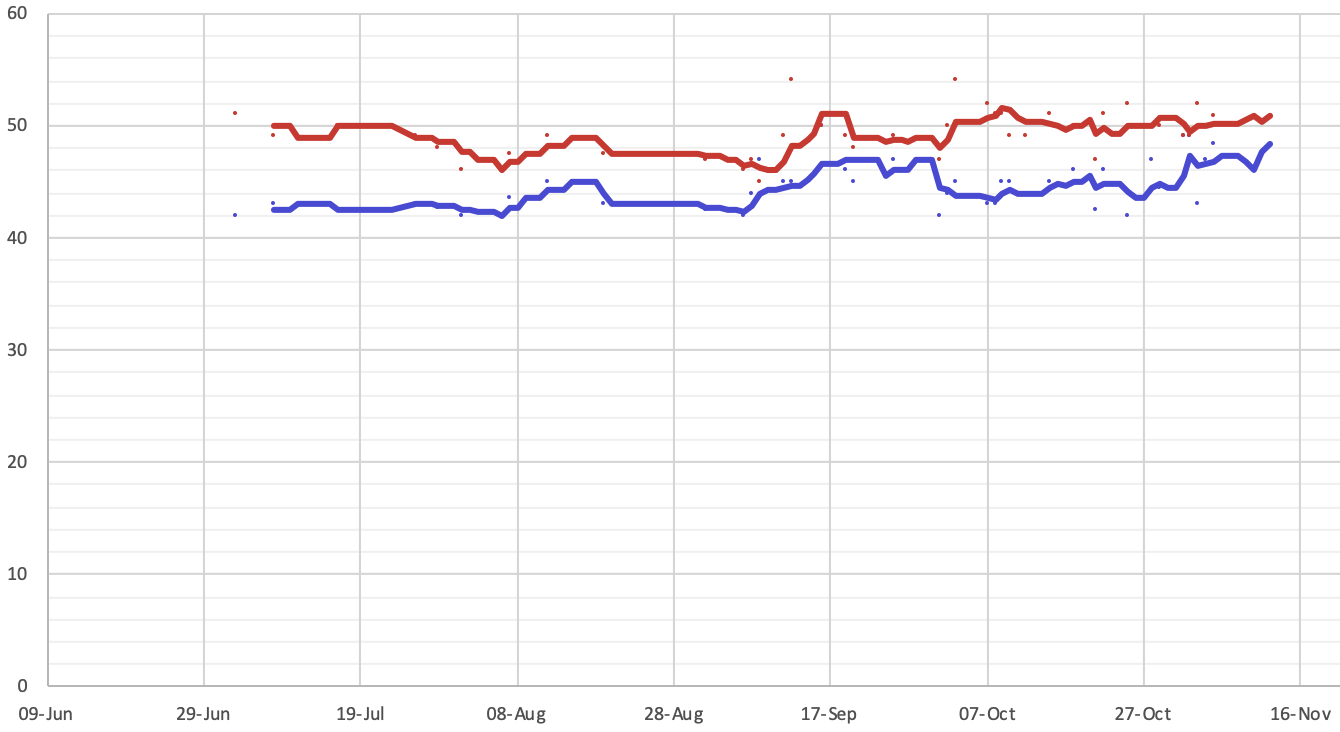

Poll source	Date(s) administered	Sample size	Margin of error	Ted Cruz (R)	Beto O'Rourke (D)	Neal Dikeman (L)	Other	Undecided
Trafalgar Group (R)	November 3–5, 2018	2,135	± 2.1%	52%	43%	–	1%	4%
Change Research (D-Reason to Believe PAC)	November 1–2, 2018	1,211	–	49%	49%	1%	–	–
Emerson College	October 28–30, 2018	781	± 3.7%	50%	47%	1%	–	2%
Quinnipiac University	October 22–28, 2018	1,078	± 3.5%	51%	46%	–	1%	3%
University of Texas Tyler	October 15–28, 2018	905 LV	–	47%	43%	–	4%	6%
University of Texas Tyler	October 15–28, 2018	1,033 RV	± 3.0%	47%	42%	–	4%	8%
Dixie Strategies	October 25–26, 2018	588	± 4.0%	52%	42%	–	–	5%
GBA Strategies (D-End Citizens United)	October 18–21, 2018	1,000	± 4.0%	50%	46%	2%	–	2%
University of Texas/YouGov	October 15–21, 2018	927	± 3.2%	51%	45%	2%	2%	–
Ipsos	October 12–18, 2018	1,298	± 3.2%	49%	44%	–	3%	1%
Tulchin Research (D-MoveOn)	October 10–14, 2018	600	± 4.0%	49%	45%	3%	–	3%
CNN/SSRS	October 9–13, 2018	716 LV	± 4.5%	52%	45%	–	0%	2%
CNN/SSRS	October 9–13, 2018	862 RV	± 4.1%	50%	45%	–	0%	3%
WPA Intelligence (R-Club for Growth)	October 8–13, 2018	801	± 3.5%	52%	43%	1%	–	4%
NYT Upshot/Siena College	October 8–11, 2018	800	± 3.6%	51%	43%	1%	–	5%
Quinnipiac University	October 3–9, 2018	730	± 4.4%	54%	45%	–	0%	2%
YouGov	October 2–5, 2018	881	–	50%	44%	–	2%	4%
Emerson College	October 1–5, 2018	500	± 4.5%	47%	42%	–	3%	8%
Public Policy Polling (D-Protect Our Care)	September 19–20, 2018	613	± 4.0%	48%	45%	–	–	8%
Public Policy Polling (D-End Citizens United)	September 19–20, 2018	603	± 4.0%	49%	46%	–	–	5%
Vox Populi Polling	September 16–18, 2018	508	± 4.4%	50%	50%	–	–	–
Quinnipiac University	September 11–17, 2018	807	± 4.1%	54%	45%	–	0%	1%
Chism Strategies (D-Reform Austin)	September 11–12, 2018	1,161	± 3.0%	49%	45%	–	–	5%
Ipsos	September 6–14, 2018	992	± 4.0%	45%	47%	–	3%	5%
Crosswind Media & Public Relations	September 6–9, 2018	800	± 4.0%	47%	44%	–	–	–
Dixie Strategies	September 6–7, 2018	519	± 4.3%	46%	42%	1%	–	11%
Emerson College	August 22–25, 2018	550	± 4.4%	38%	37%	–	4%	21%
NBC News/Marist	August 12–16, 2018	759	± 3.8%	49%	45%	–	1%	6%
Civiqs (Note: Additional data sourced from FiveThirtyEight)	August 8–11, 2018	– (Note: Not yet released)	–	47%	48%	–	–	–
Public Policy Polling (D-End Citizens United)	August 1–2, 2018	797	± 3.5%	46%	42%	–	–	–
Quinnipiac University	July 26–31, 2018	1,118	± 3.5%	49%	43%	–	0%	6%
Texas Lyceum	July 9–26, 2018	441 LV	± 4.7%	41%	39%	1%	–	19%
Texas Lyceum	July 9–26, 2018	806 RV	± 3.5%	36%	34%	3%	–	24%
Gravis Marketing	July 3–7, 2018	602	± 4.0%	51%	42%	–	–	7%
YouGov	June 19–22, 2018	821 LV	–	50%	40%	–	3%	7%
YouGov	June 19–22, 2018	1,025 RV	± 3.6%	44%	36%	–	3%	13%
University of Texas/YouGov	June 8–17, 2018	1,200	± 2.8%	41%	36%	2%	3%	17%
GQR Research (D-End Citizens United)	May 29 – June 5, 2018	1,000	± 3.1%	49%	43%	–	–	8%
Quinnipiac University	May 23–29, 2018	961	± 3.8%	50%	39%	–	0%	9%
Baselice & Associates (R-TLRPAC)	May 21–28, 2018	601	± 4.1%	48%	36%	3%	1%	11%
Public Policy Polling (D-Giffords)	May 21–22, 2018	861	± 3.3%	48%	42%	–	–	10%
JMC Analytics (R-Red Metrics Group)	May 19–21, 2018	575	± 4.1%	47%	40%	–	6%	7%
Quinnipiac University	April 12–17, 2018	1,029	± 3.6%	47%	44%	–	1%	8%
Public Policy Polling (D-End Citizens United)	January 17–18, 2018	757	± 3.6%	45%	37%	–	–	18%
WPA Intelligence (R-Cruz)	December 12–14, 2017	600	± 4.0%	52%	34%	–	1%	13%
Texas Lyceum	April 3–9, 2017	1,000	± 3.1%	30%	30%	–	3%	37%

Hypothetical polling

Poll source	Date(s) administered	Sample size	Margin of error	Ted Cruz (R)	Joaquin Castro (D)	Other	Undecided
Texas Lyceum	April 3–9, 2017	1,000	± 3.1%	31%	35%	3%	31%
Public Policy Polling	August 12–14, 2016	944	± 3.2%	48%	36%	–	16%
Dixie Strategies	August 8–9, 2016	1,018	± 3.1%	32%	31%	14%	23%

Poll source	Date(s) administered	Sample size	Margin of error	Ted Cruz (R)	Wendy Davis (D)	Undecided
Public Policy Polling	August 12–14, 2016	944	± 3.2%	49%	37%	14%

=== Results ===
On November 6, 2018, Ted Cruz defeated Beto O'Rourke. However, O'Rourke performed unexpectedly well, outperforming pre-election polling. In addition, O'Rourke flipped numerous counties that Donald Trump carried in 2016, including Williamson (includes Round Rock and Georgetown), historically conservative Tarrant (includes Fort Worth and suburbs within the DFW metroplex), Jefferson (includes Beaumont and Port Arthur), Nueces (includes Corpus Christi), sparsely populated Brewster (includes Big Bend National Park), and Hays (includes San Marcos). Cruz won only one county that voted for Hillary Clinton in 2016, sparsely populated Kenedy (coastal region south of Corpus Christi).

2018 United States Senate election in Texas
Party	Candidate	Votes	%	±%
Republican	Ted Cruz (incumbent)	4,260,553	50.89%	−5.57%
Democratic	Beto O'Rourke	4,045,632	48.33%	+7.71%
Libertarian	Neal Dikeman	65,470	0.78%	−1.28%
Total votes		8,371,655	100%	N/A
Republican hold				

==== By county ====
Legend
Counties won by Cruz
Counties won by O'Rourke

2018 U.S. Senate election results by Texas county
County	Cruz Republican		O'Rourke Democratic		Dikeman Libertarian		Margin		Total votes
County	Votes	%	Votes	%	Votes	%	Votes	%	Total votes
Anderson	11,335	76.92%	3,307	22.44%	94	0.64%	8,028	54.48%	14,736
Andrews	3,338	80.80%	776	18.78%	17	0.41%	2,562	62.02%	4,131
Angelina	19,166	72.46%	7,130	26.96%	153	0.58%	12,036	45.51%	26,449
Aransas	6,677	74.35%	2,247	25.02%	56	0.62%	4,430	49.33%	8,980
Archer	3,208	89.06%	376	10.44%	18	0.50%	2,832	78.62%	3,602
Armstrong	819	91.10%	74	8.23%	6	0.67%	745	82.87%	899
Atascosa	7,753	63.53%	4,332	35.50%	119	0.98%	3,421	28.03%	12,204
Austin	8,722	78.95%	2,241	20.29%	84	0.76%	6,481	58.67%	11,047
Bailey	1,204	74.50%	405	25.06%	7	0.43%	799	49.44%	1,616
Bandera	7,643	79.75%	1,865	19.46%	76	0.79%	5,778	60.29%	9,584
Bastrop	15,067	54.87%	12,082	44.00%	312	1.14%	2,985	10.87%	27,461
Baylor	1,070	86.64%	156	12.63%	9	0.73%	914	74.01%	1,235
Bee	4,342	60.16%	2,811	38.95%	64	0.89%	1,531	21.21%	7,217
Bell	47,437	54.79%	38,417	44.37%	723	0.84%	9,020	10.42%	86,577
Bexar	217,600	39.59%	326,946	59.49%	5,024	0.91%	109,346	19.90%	549,570
Blanco	4,181	71.99%	1,570	27.03%	57	0.98%	2,611	44.96%	5,808
Borden	320	93.29%	22	6.41%	1	0.29%	298	86.88%	343
Bosque	5,718	79.92%	1,374	19.20%	63	0.88%	4,344	60.71%	7,155
Bowie	20,157	71.17%	7,982	28.18%	182	0.64%	12,175	42.99%	28,321
Brazoria	65,693	58.78%	45,228	40.47%	832	0.74%	20,465	18.31%	111,753
Brazos	35,971	55.78%	27,876	43.23%	640	0.99%	8,095	12.55%	64,487
Brewster	1,879	45.99%	2,147	52.55%	60	1.47%	268	6.56%	4,086
Briscoe	553	88.62%	69	11.06%	2	0.32%	484	77.56%	624
Brooks	543	28.24%	1,376	71.55%	4	0.21%	833	43.32%	1,923
Brown	10,391	85.65%	1,670	13.77%	71	0.59%	8,721	71.88%	12,132
Burleson	5,079	77.53%	1,427	21.78%	45	0.69%	3,652	55.75%	6,551
Burnet	13,859	74.95%	4,444	24.03%	187	1.01%	9,415	50.92%	18,490
Caldwell	6,147	53.54%	5,227	45.53%	107	0.93%	920	8.01%	11,481
Calhoun	4,198	68.61%	1,874	30.63%	47	0.77%	2,324	37.98%	6,119
Callahan	4,373	87.06%	610	12.14%	40	0.80%	3,763	74.92%	5,023
Cameron	28,574	36.67%	48,770	62.60%	568	0.73%	20,196	25.92%	77,912
Camp	2,749	70.63%	1,119	28.75%	24	0.62%	1,630	41.88%	3,892
Carson	2,192	89.14%	245	9.96%	22	0.89%	1,947	79.18%	2,459
Cass	8,148	79.75%	2,024	19.81%	45	0.44%	6,124	59.94%	10,217
Castro	1,219	75.11%	394	24.28%	10	0.62%	825	50.83%	1,623
Chambers	12,146	80.01%	2,926	19.27%	109	0.72%	9,220	60.73%	15,181
Cherokee	11,631	77.85%	3,207	21.46%	103	0.69%	8,424	56.38%	14,941
Childress	1,526	86.21%	236	13.33%	8	0.45%	1,290	72.88%	1,770
Clay	3,710	86.52%	547	12.76%	31	0.72%	3,163	73.76%	4,288
Cochran	541	78.86%	140	20.41%	5	0.73%	401	58.45%	686
Coke	1,150	88.67%	137	10.56%	10	0.77%	1,013	78.10%	1,297
Coleman	2,759	88.26%	351	11.23%	16	0.51%	2,408	77.03%	3,126
Collin	187,425	52.65%	165,614	46.53%	2,927	0.82%	21,631	6.12%	355,966
Collingsworth	810	87.28%	113	12.18%	5	0.54%	697	75.11%	928
Colorado	5,779	75.67%	1,825	23.90%	33	0.43%	3,954	51.77%	7,637
Comal	44,079	71.68%	16,830	27.37%	586	0.95%	27,249	44.31%	61,495
Comanche	3,799	82.41%	781	16.94%	30	0.65%	3,018	65.47%	4,610
Concho	803	81.94%	163	16.63%	14	1.43%	640	65.31%	980
Cooke	11,879	81.70%	2,550	17.54%	111	0.76%	9,329	64.16%	14,540
Coryell	10,626	66.99%	5,067	31.94%	170	1.07%	5,559	35.04%	15,863
Cottle	458	82.23%	97	17.41%	2	0.36%	361	64.81%	557
Crane	836	79.24%	213	20.19%	6	0.57%	623	59.05%	1,055
Crockett	928	72.73%	340	26.65%	8	0.63%	588	46.08%	1,276
Crosby	978	68.78%	437	30.73%	7	0.49%	541	38.05%	1,422
Culberson	297	35.91%	521	63.00%	9	1.09%	224	27.09%	827
Dallam	970	87.00%	139	12.47%	6	0.54%	831	74.53%	1,115
Dallas	241,126	33.13%	481,395	66.14%	5,368	0.74%	240,269	33.01%	727,889
Dawson	2,192	72.70%	811	26.90%	12	0.40%	1,381	45.80%	3,015
Deaf Smith	2,680	70.99%	1,067	28.26%	28	0.74%	1,613	42.73%	3,775
Delta	1,562	80.85%	354	18.32%	16	0.83%	1,208	62.53%	1,932
Denton	158,744	53.67%	134,649	45.52%	2,409	0.81%	24,095	8.15%	295,802
Dewitt	4,974	81.13%	1,128	18.40%	29	0.47%	3,846	62.73%	6,131
Dickens	635	84.22%	113	14.99%	6	0.80%	522	69.23%	754
Dimmit	840	29.03%	2,042	70.56%	12	0.41%	1,202	41.53%	2,894
Donley	1,110	86.79%	161	12.59%	8	0.63%	949	74.20%	1,279
Duval	1,330	32.34%	2,765	67.23%	18	0.44%	1,435	34.89%	4,113
Eastland	5,377	86.66%	800	12.89%	28	0.45%	4,577	73.76%	6,205
Ector	20,996	68.90%	9,230	30.29%	248	0.81%	11,766	38.61%	30,474
Edwards	604	79.79%	145	19.15%	8	1.06%	459	60.63%	757
Ellis	41,022	67.71%	19,106	31.53%	461	0.76%	21,916	36.17%	60,589
El Paso	50,943	25.02%	151,482	74.40%	1,189	0.58%	100,539	49.38%	203,614
Erath	10,055	79.64%	2,486	19.69%	84	0.66%	7,569	59.95%	12,625
Falls	3,215	68.70%	1,445	30.88%	20	0.43%	1,770	37.82%	4,680
Fannin	8,569	79.71%	2,107	19.60%	74	0.69%	6,462	60.11%	10,750
Fayette	8,228	78.52%	2,198	20.98%	53	0.51%	6,030	57.54%	10,479
Fisher	1,139	76.24%	340	22.76%	15	1.00%	799	53.48%	1,494
Floyd	1,394	74.19%	476	25.33%	9	0.48%	918	48.86%	1,879
Foard	321	73.79%	113	25.98%	1	0.23%	208	47.82%	435
Fort Bend	111,423	43.62%	142,399	55.75%	1,616	0.63%	30,976	12.13%	255,438
Franklin	3,300	83.04%	639	16.08%	35	0.88%	2,661	66.96%	3,974
Freestone	5,243	79.90%	1,279	19.49%	40	0.61%	3,964	60.41%	6,562
Frio	1,636	44.46%	2,016	54.78%	28	0.76%	380	10.33%	3,680
Gaines	3,317	86.18%	513	13.33%	19	0.49%	2,804	72.85%	3,849
Galveston	67,641	59.53%	45,065	39.66%	916	0.81%	22,576	19.87%	113,622
Garza	1,068	82.98%	203	15.77%	16	1.24%	865	67.21%	1,287
Gillespie	9,890	78.85%	2,572	20.51%	81	0.65%	7,318	58.34%	12,543
Glasscock	513	92.60%	37	6.68%	4	0.72%	476	85.92%	554
Goliad	2,326	75.72%	717	23.34%	29	0.94%	1,609	52.38%	3,072
Gonzales	4,173	74.19%	1,421	25.26%	31	0.55%	2,752	48.92%	5,625
Gray	5,246	88.90%	615	10.42%	40	0.68%	4,631	78.48%	5,901
Grayson	31,655	73.37%	11,157	25.86%	332	0.77%	20,498	47.51%	43,144
Gregg	24,569	68.37%	11,133	30.98%	234	0.65%	13,436	37.39%	35,936
Grimes	6,499	75.51%	2,037	23.67%	71	0.82%	4,462	51.84%	8,607
Guadalupe	33,938	62.19%	20,079	36.79%	554	1.02%	13,859	25.40%	54,571
Hale	5,360	72.51%	1,970	26.65%	62	0.84%	3,390	45.86%	7,392
Hall	807	83.11%	161	16.58%	3	0.31%	646	66.53%	971
Hamilton	2,795	83.93%	507	15.23%	28	0.84%	2,288	68.71%	3,330
Hansford	1,552	90.76%	138	8.07%	20	1.17%	1,414	82.69%	1,710
Hardeman	973	83.73%	185	15.92%	4	0.34%	788	67.81%	1,162
Hardin	17,391	86.53%	2,636	13.12%	71	0.35%	14,755	73.42%	20,098
Harris	498,902	41.31%	700,200	57.98%	8,652	0.72%	201,298	16.67%	1,207,754
Harrison	16,226	71.82%	6,245	27.64%	122	0.54%	9,981	44.18%	22,593
Hartley	1,467	90.33%	153	9.42%	4	0.25%	1,314	80.91%	1,624
Haskell	1,362	81.36%	302	18.04%	10	0.60%	1,060	63.32%	1,674
Hays	33,308	41.77%	45,584	57.16%	854	1.07%	12,276	15.39%	79,746
Hemphill	1,209	87.93%	157	11.42%	9	0.65%	1,052	76.51%	1,375
Henderson	20,891	78.80%	5,415	20.43%	205	0.77%	15,476	58.38%	26,511
Hidalgo	46,505	30.64%	104,416	68.81%	834	0.55%	57,911	38.16%	151,755
Hill	8,927	78.08%	2,443	21.37%	63	0.55%	6,484	56.71%	11,433
Hockley	4,844	79.49%	1,211	19.87%	39	0.64%	3,633	59.62%	6,094
Hood	20,090	80.34%	4,720	18.88%	195	0.78%	15,370	61.47%	25,005
Hopkins	9,306	78.07%	2,545	21.35%	69	0.58%	6,761	56.72%	11,920
Houston	5,552	75.43%	1,772	24.08%	36	0.49%	3,780	51.36%	7,360
Howard	5,651	76.32%	1,693	22.87%	60	0.81%	3,958	53.46%	7,404
Hudspeth	509	54.56%	407	43.62%	17	1.82%	102	10.93%	933
Hunt	21,115	74.12%	7,151	25.10%	222	0.78%	13,964	49.02%	28,488
Hutchinson	5,854	88.14%	753	11.34%	35	0.53%	5,101	76.80%	6,642
Irion	636	86.18%	96	13.01%	6	0.81%	540	73.17%	738
Jack	2,498	88.80%	296	10.52%	19	0.68%	2,202	78.28%	2,813
Jackson	3,991	82.46%	832	17.19%	17	0.35%	3,159	65.27%	4,840
Jasper	9,504	80.32%	2,282	19.29%	47	0.40%	7,222	61.03%	11,833
Jeff Davis	683	58.03%	466	39.59%	28	2.38%	217	18.44%	1,177
Jefferson	36,731	49.48%	37,128	50.01%	380	0.51%	397	0.53%	74,239
Jim Hogg	410	27.74%	1,060	71.72%	8	0.54%	650	43.98%	1,478
Jim Wells	4,520	45.66%	5,331	53.85%	49	0.49%	811	8.19%	9,900
Johnson	39,571	75.47%	12,411	23.67%	454	0.87%	27,160	51.80%	52,436
Jones	4,115	82.56%	832	16.69%	37	0.74%	3,283	65.87%	4,984
Karnes	2,900	70.12%	1,203	29.09%	33	0.80%	1,697	41.03%	4,136
Kaufman	26,118	68.07%	12,002	31.28%	252	0.66%	14,116	36.79%	38,372
Kendall	15,292	77.25%	4,340	21.92%	164	0.83%	10,952	55.32%	19,796
Kenedy	100	55.56%	77	42.78%	3	1.67%	23	12.78%	180
Kent	288	85.46%	44	13.06%	5	1.48%	244	72.40%	337
Kerr	16,822	75.76%	5,198	23.41%	185	0.83%	11,624	52.35%	22,205
Kimble	1,495	87.73%	195	11.44%	14	0.82%	1,300	76.29%	1,704
King	124	94.66%	6	4.58%	1	0.76%	118	90.08%	131
Kinney	827	68.97%	358	29.86%	14	1.17%	469	39.12%	1,199
Kleberg	4,081	47.48%	4,456	51.84%	59	0.69%	375	4.36%	8,596
Knox	855	78.23%	229	20.95%	9	0.82%	626	57.27%	1,093
Lamar	12,711	76.72%	3,731	22.52%	126	0.76%	8,980	54.20%	16,568
Lamb	2,741	79.29%	699	20.22%	17	0.49%	2,042	59.07%	3,457
Lampasas	5,836	78.13%	1,569	21.00%	65	0.87%	4,267	57.12%	7,470
La Salle	673	45.20%	813	54.60%	3	0.20%	140	9.40%	1,489
Lavaca	6,688	86.44%	1,019	13.17%	30	0.39%	5,669	73.27%	7,737
Lee	4,487	76.74%	1,322	22.61%	38	0.65%	3,165	54.13%	5,847
Leon	5,711	86.67%	855	12.98%	23	0.35%	4,856	73.70%	6,589
Liberty	16,041	77.96%	4,421	21.49%	114	0.55%	11,620	56.47%	20,576
Limestone	5,211	75.35%	1,672	24.18%	33	0.48%	3,539	51.17%	6,916
Lipscomb	942	88.28%	116	10.87%	9	0.84%	826	77.41%	1,067
Live Oak	3,029	82.96%	601	16.46%	21	0.58%	2,428	66.50%	3,651
Llano	7,954	78.33%	2,124	20.92%	76	0.75%	5,830	57.42%	10,154
Loving	47	87.04%	6	11.11%	1	1.85%	41	75.93%	54
Lubbock	58,780	64.19%	32,068	35.02%	731	0.80%	26,712	29.17%	91,579
Lynn	1,369	80.67%	323	19.03%	5	0.29%	1,046	61.64%	1,697
McCulloch	2,245	84.05%	400	14.98%	26	0.97%	1,845	69.08%	2,671
McLennan	45,855	61.24%	28,452	38.00%	568	0.76%	17,403	23.24%	74,875
McMullen	387	90.00%	41	9.53%	2	0.47%	346	80.47%	430
Madison	3,033	79.17%	780	20.36%	18	0.47%	2,253	58.81%	3,831
Marion	2,448	70.00%	1,018	29.11%	31	0.89%	1,430	40.89%	3,497
Martin	1,297	83.46%	243	15.64%	14	0.90%	1,054	67.82%	1,554
Mason	1,560	79.31%	402	20.44%	5	0.25%	1,158	58.87%	1,967
Matagorda	7,330	70.10%	3,049	29.16%	78	0.75%	4,281	40.94%	10,457
Maverick	2,951	27.38%	7,727	71.71%	98	0.91%	4,776	44.32%	10,776
Medina	11,444	70.73%	4,621	28.56%	114	0.70%	6,823	42.17%	16,179
Menard	632	80.72%	145	18.52%	6	0.77%	487	62.20%	783
Midland	32,867	76.51%	9,723	22.64%	365	0.85%	23,144	53.88%	42,955
Milam	5,922	74.15%	1,997	25.00%	68	0.85%	3,925	49.14%	7,987
Mills	1,764	88.02%	229	11.43%	11	0.55%	1,535	76.60%	2,004
Mitchell	1,585	82.85%	323	16.88%	5	0.26%	1,262	65.97%	1,913
Montague	6,424	86.57%	941	12.68%	56	0.75%	5,483	73.88%	7,421
Montgomery	137,395	72.28%	51,268	26.97%	1,433	0.75%	86,127	45.31%	190,096
Moore	3,248	80.00%	787	19.38%	25	0.62%	2,461	60.62%	4,060
Morris	2,953	69.74%	1,260	29.76%	21	0.50%	1,693	39.99%	4,234
Motley	483	91.65%	40	7.59%	4	0.76%	443	84.06%	527
Nacogdoches	13,775	63.68%	7,732	35.74%	126	0.58%	6,043	27.93%	21,633
Navarro	10,391	72.08%	3,918	27.18%	107	0.74%	6,473	44.90%	14,416
Newton	3,660	78.27%	993	21.24%	23	0.49%	2,667	57.04%	4,676
Nolan	3,120	76.58%	928	22.78%	26	0.64%	2,192	53.80%	4,074
Nueces	45,956	48.85%	47,392	50.38%	719	0.76%	1,436	1.53%	94,067
Ochiltree	2,160	89.44%	230	9.52%	25	1.04%	1,930	79.92%	2,415
Oldham	732	89.71%	82	10.05%	2	0.25%	650	79.66%	816
Orange	21,164	80.37%	5,050	19.18%	118	0.45%	16,114	61.20%	26,332
Palo Pinto	7,547	80.03%	1,837	19.48%	46	0.49%	5,710	60.55%	9,430
Panola	7,120	81.38%	1,598	18.26%	31	0.35%	5,522	63.12%	8,749
Parker	44,071	80.87%	9,956	18.27%	468	0.86%	34,115	62.60%	54,495
Parmer	1,675	81.43%	372	18.08%	10	0.49%	1,303	63.34%	2,057
Pecos	2,161	61.39%	1,339	38.04%	20	0.57%	822	23.35%	3,520
Polk	12,794	76.38%	3,850	22.99%	106	0.63%	8,944	53.40%	16,750
Potter	16,689	68.33%	7,521	30.79%	214	0.88%	9,168	37.54%	24,424
Presidio	436	26.15%	1,221	73.25%	10	0.60%	785	47.09%	1,667
Rains	3,702	84.02%	681	15.46%	23	0.52%	3,021	68.57%	4,406
Randall	38,479	79.41%	9,613	19.84%	363	0.75%	28,866	59.57%	48,455
Reagan	692	82.97%	136	16.31%	6	0.72%	556	66.67%	834
Real	1,311	83.82%	245	15.66%	8	0.51%	1,066	68.16%	1,564
Red River	3,427	77.57%	973	22.02%	18	0.41%	2,454	55.55%	4,418
Reeves	1,128	47.04%	1,255	52.34%	15	0.63%	127	5.30%	2,398
Refugio	1,636	65.65%	847	33.99%	9	0.36%	789	31.66%	2,492
Roberts	441	95.87%	19	4.13%	0	0.00%	422	91.74%	460
Robertson	4,295	68.52%	1,942	30.98%	31	0.49%	2,353	37.54%	6,268
Rockwall	26,615	68.77%	11,754	30.37%	330	0.85%	14,861	38.40%	38,699
Runnels	2,842	87.88%	385	11.90%	7	0.22%	2,457	75.97%	3,234
Rusk	12,597	77.37%	3,609	22.17%	76	0.47%	8,988	55.20%	16,282
Sabine	3,456	87.12%	496	12.50%	15	0.38%	2,960	74.62%	3,967
San Augustine	2,266	75.13%	734	24.34%	16	0.53%	1,532	50.80%	3,016
San Jacinto	7,499	80.30%	1,785	19.11%	55	0.59%	5,714	61.18%	9,339
San Patricio	11,335	62.22%	6,777	37.20%	107	0.59%	4,558	25.02%	18,219
San Saba	1,811	87.53%	247	11.94%	11	0.53%	1,564	75.59%	2,069
Schleicher	735	77.21%	209	21.95%	8	0.84%	526	55.25%	952
Scurry	3,705	84.92%	642	14.71%	16	0.37%	3,063	70.20%	4,363
Shackelford	1,174	91.65%	103	8.04%	4	0.31%	1,071	83.61%	1,281
Shelby	6,008	79.46%	1,521	20.12%	32	0.42%	4,487	59.34%	7,561
Sherman	692	84.18%	87	10.58%	43	5.23%	605	73.60%	822
Smith	53,760	69.46%	23,182	29.95%	458	0.59%	30,578	39.51%	77,400
Somervell	3,033	82.17%	633	17.15%	25	0.68%	2,400	65.02%	3,691
Starr	2,443	22.65%	8,273	76.72%	68	0.63%	5,830	54.06%	10,784
Stephens	2,631	88.65%	324	10.92%	13	0.44%	2,307	77.73%	2,968
Sterling	442	90.95%	44	9.05%	0	0.00%	398	81.89%	486
Stonewall	497	80.94%	112	18.24%	5	0.81%	385	62.70%	614
Sutton	934	77.45%	265	21.97%	7	0.58%	669	55.47%	1,206
Swisher	1,461	77.10%	420	22.16%	14	0.74%	1,041	54.93%	1,895
Tarrant	309,189	49.24%	313,497	49.93%	5,208	0.83%	4,308	0.69%	627,894
Taylor	29,811	73.32%	10,489	25.80%	357	0.88%	19,322	47.52%	40,657
Terrell	323	69.16%	139	29.76%	5	1.07%	184	39.40%	467
Terry	2,169	77.11%	629	22.36%	15	0.53%	1,540	54.75%	2,813
Throckmorton	617	87.77%	77	10.95%	9	1.28%	540	76.81%	703
Titus	5,685	71.02%	2,265	28.29%	55	0.69%	3,420	42.72%	8,005
Tom Green	24,648	71.18%	9,690	27.98%	292	0.84%	14,958	43.19%	34,630
Travis	119,278	24.63%	359,772	74.30%	5,154	1.06%	240,494	49.67%	484,204
Trinity	4,146	80.12%	998	19.29%	31	0.60%	3,148	60.83%	5,175
Tyler	5,919	82.91%	1,185	16.60%	35	0.49%	4,734	66.31%	7,139
Upshur	11,529	82.44%	2,364	16.91%	91	0.65%	9,165	65.54%	13,984
Upton	854	82.83%	169	16.39%	8	0.78%	685	66.44%	1,031
Uvalde	4,348	54.80%	3,528	44.46%	59	0.74%	820	10.33%	7,935
Val Verde	5,345	46.87%	5,955	52.21%	105	0.92%	610	5.35%	11,405
Van Zandt	15,182	84.66%	2,634	14.69%	116	0.65%	12,548	69.98%	17,932
Victoria	19,005	69.85%	8,046	29.57%	157	0.58%	10,959	40.28%	27,208
Walker	11,535	64.61%	6,186	34.65%	132	0.74%	5,349	29.96%	17,853
Waller	10,167	61.24%	6,335	38.16%	101	0.61%	3,832	23.08%	16,603
Ward	2,096	71.78%	800	27.40%	24	0.82%	1,296	44.38%	2,920
Washington	10,134	75.11%	3,263	24.18%	95	0.70%	6,871	50.93%	13,492
Webb	13,814	27.97%	35,159	71.20%	408	0.83%	21,345	43.23%	49,381
Wharton	9,094	70.27%	3,793	29.31%	55	0.42%	5,301	40.96%	12,942
Wheeler	1,679	92.76%	125	6.91%	6	0.33%	1,554	85.86%	1,810
Wichita	23,648	69.72%	9,971	29.40%	299	0.88%	13,677	40.32%	33,918
Wilbarger	2,639	76.74%	776	22.56%	24	0.70%	1,863	54.17%	3,439
Willacy	1,527	35.31%	2,773	64.12%	25	0.58%	1,246	28.81%	4,325
Williamson	99,857	47.96%	105,850	50.84%	2,514	1.21%	5,993	2.88%	208,221
Wilson	13,025	73.51%	4,567	25.77%	127	0.72%	8,458	47.73%	17,719
Winkler	1,123	77.18%	321	22.06%	11	0.76%	802	55.12%	1,455
Wise	19,023	82.29%	3,915	16.94%	179	0.77%	15,108	65.35%	23,117
Wood	13,987	83.55%	2,635	15.74%	118	0.70%	11,352	67.81%	16,740
Yoakum	1,558	81.87%	335	17.60%	10	0.53%	1,223	64.27%	1,903
Young	5,543	86.54%	821	12.82%	41	0.64%	4,722	73.72%	6,405
Zapata	821	36.93%	1,392	62.62%	10	0.45%	571	25.69%	2,223
Zavala	589	20.19%	2,313	79.29%	15	0.51%	1,724	59.10%	2,917
Total	4,260,553	50.89%	4,045,632	48.33%	65,470	0.78%	214,921	2.57%	8,371,655
	Cruz Republican		O'Rourke Democratic		Dikeman Libertarian		Margin		Total votes

Counties that flipped from Republican to Democratic

- Brewster (largest municipality: Alpine)
- Fort Bend (largest municipality: Sugar Land)
- Harris (largest municipality: Houston)
- Hays (largest municipality: San Marcos)
- Nueces (largest municipality: Corpus Christi)
- Tarrant (largest municipality: Fort Worth)
- Williamson (largest municipality: Round Rock)

==== By congressional district ====
Cruz won 20 of 36 congressional districts; O'Rourke won the other 16, including three held by Republicans.

District	Cruz	O'Rourke	Representative
1st	72%	28%	Louie Gohmert
2nd	50%	49%	Ted Poe
2nd	50%	49%	Dan Crenshaw
3rd	51%	48%	Sam Johnson
3rd	51%	48%	Van Taylor
4th	74%	25%	John Ratcliffe
5th	60%	39%	Jeb Hensarling
5th	60%	39%	Lance Gooden
6th	51%	48%	Joe Barton
6th	51%	48%	Ron Wright
7th	46%	53%	John Culberson
7th	46%	53%	Lizzie Fletcher
8th	71%	28%	Kevin Brady
9th	19%	81%	Al Green
10th	49%	50%	Michael McCaul
11th	78%	22%	Mike Conaway
12th	60%	39%	Kay Granger
13th	79%	20%	Mac Thornberry
14th	58%	41%	Randy Weber
15th	42%	57%	Vicente Gonzalez
16th	26%	74%	Beto O'Rourke
16th	26%	74%	Veronica Escobar
17th	54%	45%	Bill Flores
18th	20%	79%	Sheila Jackson Lee
19th	72%	28%	Jodey Arrington
20th	33%	66%	Joaquín Castro
21st	50%	49%	Lamar Smith
21st	50%	49%	Chip Roy
22nd	50%	49%	Pete Olson
23rd	47%	52%	Will Hurd
24th	48%	51%	Kenny Marchant
25th	52%	47%	Roger Williams
26th	57%	42%	Michael Burgess
27th	60%	39%	Michael Cloud
28th	41%	59%	Henry Cuellar
29th	25%	74%	Gene Green
29th	25%	74%	Sylvia Garcia
30th	18%	82%	Eddie Bernice Johnson
31st	51%	48%	John Carter
32nd	44%	55%	Pete Sessions
32nd	44%	55%	Colin Allred
33rd	22%	77%	Marc Veasey
34th	42%	58%	Filemon Vela Jr.
35th	27%	72%	Lloyd Doggett
36th	71%	28%	Brian Babin
