= Jordan Chariton =

American investigative reporter (born 1986)

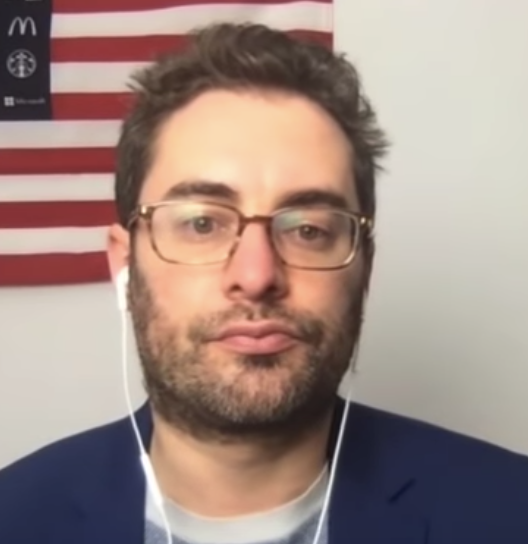
- Chariton in May 2020
- Born: September 20, 1986 (age 40)
- Education: University of Tampa
- Presenting career
- Show: Status Coup
- Style: Progressive
- Country: United States
- Previous shows: Fox News; MSNBC; The Young Turks; Jordan Chariton Reports
- Website: www.statuscoup.com

Jordan Daniel Chariton (born September 20, 1986) is an American investigative reporter. Chariton is the CEO of Status Coup, a progressive media outlet that features investigative and on-the-ground reporting on politics, corruption, the working class, social justice, and the environment.

Chariton's reporting has been published in The Guardian, VICE News, The Intercept, Detroit Metro Times, The Hill, Mediaite, and CNBC.com. Chariton previously worked for digital news network The Young Turks, where he covered the 2016 presidential election, the protests at Standing Rock, North Dakota, and notably the Flint water crisis.

== Early life and education ==
Chariton was born and raised in Long Island, New York, graduating from Massapequa High School in 2004. He graduated from the University of Tampa in 2008, Majoring in Communications, with a Minor in Writing.

== Career ==
Chariton's early experience working in mainstream media spanned left-wing and right-wing news outlets. His cable news background included Fox News, Fox Business and MSNBC. He also reported for TheWrap and TVNewser, Salon, and Mediaite, as well as the non-profit 92nd Street Y.

=== At Fox News ===
Chariton began his professional career in news at Fox News in 2008. He was initially booking guests on its live election-themed web show The Strategy Room, after which he began producing segments and live shows. In 2010, Chariton moved over to Fox Business as a guest booker and producer for “Freedom Watch,” hosted by libertarian host Judge Andrew Napolitano.

=== At MSNBC ===
In 2011, Chariton left Fox News and joined the MSNBC network as a guest booker for a variety of daytime programs. Chariton primarily focused on political pundits and guests providing analysis and commentary on the 2012 presidential campaign, as well as the Occupy Wall Street movement as it was occurring.

=== At 92nd Street Y ===
Chariton left MSNBC in 2012 for the NYC non-profit 92nd Street Y as a digital producer for its Campaign for the American Conversation video series. As CAC producer, Chariton interviewed journalists, politicians, and think tank experts, and was nominated for a 2013 Webby Award. In 2013, Chariton moved from the digital to the event side of 92Y, helping book guests for 92Y's lecture series such as Obama's 2008 campaign manager, David Plouffe.

=== At Mediaite, TVNewser, and TheWrap ===
Chariton began freelance writing for Mediaite in 2013, a website focusing on politics and media. His commentary covered media hypocrisy, presidential campaigns, gun violence in America, the military industrial complex, among other contemporary issues. He also wrote about the growing social TV industry for another Mediabistro blog “Lost Remote.” Chariton saw the electronic news industry evolving and joined TVNewser, a Mediabistro blog focusing on the television news industry. There, Chariton covered ratings, hiring, cable news coverage, and interviewed anchors and journalists from a variety of networks. He wrote multiple articles about the transitioning of the medium, and the increasingly significant role that electronic media and social media had in contemporary news. In 2014, Chariton joined LA-based entertainment trade website TheWrap as its media reporter. At The Wrap, Chariton broke stories about CNN staffers’ complaints about the network's obsessive coverage of Donald Trump, MSNBC's executives shifting the network away from a Progressive identity, and "Legacy newspapers like the New York Times and Washington Post's pivot to digital subscriptions."

=== At The Young Turks/TYT Politics ===
Chariton was hired as the first-ever on-the-ground reporter for the online Progressive commentary show The Young Turks. He was hired to run TYT Politics YouTube channel, which he grew to 140,000 subscribers in his first year. He is best known for covering (at the scene) the Flint water crisis, the protests at Standing Rock, North Dakota, and the DNC Wikileaks scandal as well as the Podesta emails. He also covered the water crisis at Cape Fear, North Carolina.

Chariton interviewed activist/Oscar-winning actress Susan Sarandon in 2016 for the Rebel HQ segment of TYT Politics. The clip of her thoughts on Donald Trump was picked up by several media outlets, including the New York Daily News, Politico, and Entertainment Weekly.

Chariton became known for his interviews with voters, activists, working-class people, and community members rather than political pundits and campaign operatives. He reported on the controversy involving Democratic National Committee interim chairwoman Donna Brazile during the 2016 presidential election. Chariton also grew acclaim for challenging supporters of Donald Trump, with several of his interviews going viral online. His most memorable moment from the 2016 campaign trail was when he challenged Democratic strategist and CNN contributor Donna Brazile about her passing off questions for a CNN town hall to Hillary Clinton's campaign ahead of time.

Beyond the campaign, Chariton rose to notoriety for his on-the-ground coverage from North Dakota from indigenous protests at Standing Rock against the Dakota Access Pipeline (he took seven reporting trips there from August 2016 to February 2017). At Standing Rock, Chariton interviewed hundreds of indigenous people and environmental activists and was one of the few national journalists to cover violent standoffs between local police and protesters.

In 2017, Chariton hosted a live town hall meeting from Flint where he interviewed sick residents suffering from the toxic water they consumed. The town hall was watched by hundreds of thousands of viewers. Chariton also embarked on a “Disappearing Middle Class” reporting tour through Pennsylvania, Ohio, Illinois, Michigan, and Wisconsin where he interviewed struggling people and workers living paycheck to paycheck, homeless individuals, and political activists. Chariton's coverage helped grow the TYT Politics YouTube channel to 140,000 subscribers in under a year.

In October 2017, Chariton and The Young Turks cameraman Ty Bayliss were arrested in St. Louis while covering Black Lives Matter protests after police officer Jason Stockley was acquitted for shooting and killing Anthony Lamar Smith, a 24-year-old African American man. After the arrest, on misdemeanor charges of trespassing, Cenk Uygur tweeted to demand the immediate release of Chariton and Bayliss and to declare that the arrest was a violation of the First Amendment and a clear attack on the freedom of the press.

=== As Independent Media Owner ===
Chariton launched his own YouTube channel and website in February 2018, that focused on investigative reporting. The channel and website were under an umbrella grouping called Jordan Chariton Reports. As part of Jordan Chariton Reports, on May 27, 2018, he released an investigative piece on TruthDig showing that the science and data used to declare the water safe in Flint, Michigan was suspect, which was later featured on May 31, 2018, on the Thom Hartmann Program. That project morphed into a Progressive independent investigative reporting network and media outlet, called Status Coup. It was on Status Coup, where he has broken numerous high-profile stories and captured iconic video images, that have been re-broadcast by the major media outlets.

== Status Coup ==
In 2018, Jordan Chariton co-founded with Jenn Dize the Progressive independent investigative reporting network and media outlet, called Status Coup, the play-on-words to pull off a journalistic “coup” of the Status quo. It focuses on in-field and investigative reporting around the country from both internal and external reporters. Chariton and Dize reported on Flint, the 2020 elections, Nina Turner's Congressional Primary, the MAGA movement, Black Lives Matter protests, and the Steven Donziger incarceration. In 2021, Dize went on to do her own personal projects on Courage News, while Chariton continued in his role as CEO and reporter.

For Status Coup, Chariton has reported extensively in Flint Michigan continuing to cover the ongoing water crisis and government cover-up, along with on-the-ground coverage that has made national news headlines. In May 2018, he went to Virginia to cover protests against the Mountain Valley Pipeline and Atlantic Coast Pipeline. In 2019 and 2020, he traveled across the country covering the 2020 presidential campaign, focusing on Bernie Sanders' second presidential run, as well as other candidates. As in 2016, several of Chariton's 2020 campaign interviews with supporters of President Trump went viral.

Other reporting Chariton has done for Status Coup include coverage of gentrification in Seattle because of Amazon, covering the police killing of 25-year-old African American Botham Jean in Dallas, police violence in Chicago, several reporting trips during the Coronavirus pandemic, interviewing struggling tenants facing eviction and laid off workers, reporting in Florida on the controversial “Don’t Say Gay Bill,” in Buffalo on socialist India Walton's mayoral campaign, in Ohio on Nina Turner's congressional campaign, and a multi-state “Economic Hunger Games” reporting tour where Chariton interviewed workers struggling due to inflation and homeless people. Status Coup also uses freelance reporters in different parts of the U.S.

=== Flint Water Crisis ===
Chariton has made over 18 trips to Flint to investigate and report on the Flint Water Crisis. His reports have appeared in the Detroit Metro Times, TheHill.com, and popular YouTube news channel Breaking Points.

In 2020 and 2021, in a publishing collaboration with VICE News, The Intercept, and The Guardian, Chariton's Status Coup broke four significant investigative stories on the Flint water cover-up in those outlets. One of those stories, which Status Coup's Chariton and Dize co-published with The Intercept and Detroit Metro Times, revealed top officials' part of ex-Michigan Governor Rick Snyder's administration had their phones "wiped clean" shortly before the launch of the Flint water criminal investigation. In response to the story, Congressional House Oversight Committee Chairman Rep. Carolyn Maloney issued a statement condemning Governor Snyder for his "choice to put money over the lives of the children in Flint." Sources with the Congressional Oversight committee told Status Coup News it would be investigating the potential destruction of evidence by top Snyder administration officials revealed in the story. Chariton and Status Coup's Flint water investigative reporting has led to Chariton appearing on Flint native Michael Moore's "Rumble" podcast twice along with other high-profile media appearances.

On April 16, 2020, evidence of corruption and a cover-up in the Flint Water Crisis by former Michigan Governor Rick Snyder and his “fixer” Rich Baird was exposed in an article published by Vice News. The article was written by Jordan Chariton and Jenn Dize, the co-founders of Status Coup, with photos by Brittany Greeson. The responses from Michigan state authorities denied that a deadline was approaching, and said that criminal prosecutions would follow.

In January 2021, charges were brought against nine officials, including former Governor Snyder. Chariton was interviewed by Detroit television station WDIV Local 4, on their Flashpoint program.

In January 2022, Chariton and longtime Detroit reporter Charlie LeDuff revealed that, in 2019, Democratic attorney general Dana Nessel stopped pursuing credible racketeering (RICO) charges against some people behind the apparent Flint water bond deal financial fraud that the Republican AG Bill Schuette's team had investigated.

Chariton's book on the water crisis, We the Poisoned: Exposing the Flint Water Crisis Cover Up and the Poisoning of 100,000 Americans (ISBN 978-1-5381-9424-9) ships in August 2024, timed with the 10th anniversary of the start of the crisis. The book's introduction is by high-profile environmental activist and lawyer Erin Brockovich.

=== 2020 Iowa Caucus ===
In December 2020, Chariton broke a story for The Intercept about the 2020 Iowa Democratic presidential caucuses Primary election investigation. His reporting revealed how the Democratic National Committee (DNC) was not cooperating with investigations into the questionable coding and their access to raw data and vote results.

=== Second Amendment rally livestream ===
YouTube removed a Status Coup livestream of a peaceful Second Amendment rally in January 2021 after the online platform alleged the footage was a violation of its firearms policy. The footage was restored by YouTube after Chariton protested the move on Twitter.

=== Storming of the United States Capitol ===
On January 6, 2021, the United States Capitol was stormed by supporters of then President Trump. Jon Farina, shooting live footage for Status Coup, captured the historic footage from inside the U.S. Capitol showing Metropolitan Police officer Daniel Hodges' full body and head being rammed into a door by supporters of President Donald Trump. The Status Coup footage was licensed and reused by multiple media organizations including CNN, NBC News, ABC News, CBS News, BBC News, Showtime, PBS, ITV, ITN, LeMonde, ProPublica, MSNBC, The Washington Post, The Guardian, The Associated Press and The New York Times.

Similar to what happened with the Status Coup's livestream of the Second Amendment rally, YouTube later took down Status Coup's own footage of the Storming of the Capitol, stating that it was "advancing claims of election fraud" while the same footage licensed to the other media organizations was still up on the platform. Chariton said the situation made him angry and perplexed that YouTube could not distinguish between footage documenting a historical event and people purposefully spreading misinformation regarding the 2020 US election. He described YouTube's move as "alarming and dangerous" and hoped that other media organizations would speak out against "the onslaught of censorship against leftist channels." Chariton said that it was part of a wider trend to remove "independent and progressive channels" which advertisers found unfavourable, done by YouTube under the pretext of "removing extremist right-wing content". He stated "it is corporate censorship by YouTube" aimed at appeasing "corporate advertisers".

Chariton has shifted his previous stance supporting the removal of outlets for disseminating conspiracy theories to one having the "right" to say controversial views or information "dressed up as journalism" as long as calls for violence are not made. He opposes Big Tech platforms "making decisions to avoid regulation determining through their algorithm what is and isn't trustworthy news".

=== Labor movement ===
Chariton has covered the resurgence of the American labor movement, focusing on union drives and worker strikes around the country. In 2020 and 2021, Chariton covered the union drive of Amazon workers at the JFK8 warehouse in Staten Island, interviewing workers at the warehouse many times and breaking stories on Amazon's union busting. JFK8 workers went on to win a historic union victory, becoming Amazon's first unionized warehouse. Chariton was in Buffalo, NY, for the Buffalo Starbucks' historic union campaign and victory, interviewing workers on-the-ground in Buffalo ahead of their victory. Chariton covered the historic, and successful, strike waged by John Deere workers, interviewing workers at picket lines in Iowa and Illinois. Chariton has also reported on strikes launched by coal miners in Alabama, Frito Lay workers in Kansas, and Nabisco workers in Oregon, which was cited and linked to by CBS News.

== Controversies ==
In November 2017, HuffPost contributor, Christian Chiakulas, accused Chariton in a HuffPost blog of sexually assaulting an activist and reporter, Carly Hammond, who worked with him at his former news organization, Truth Against the Machine. The accusation impacted Chariton's standing at The Young Turks, from which he was put on leave following the article.

Chariton said he was stunned at the accusation, and two eyewitnesses came forward backing up Chariton's account. HuffPost, which did not vet the blog post before publishing it, took it down within 24 hours, and Chiakulas later walked back the accusation, saying: "The reasons I wrote the story are hard to explain — the circumstances around which it were written are complicated...I rushed out that article and was thrust into the middle of this. In hindsight, it was a bad way to go about it." TYT wanted to distance themselves from the incident in order to protect their image, and fired Chariton when he refused to resign over the false accusation. However, TYT later revised their initial public statement on January 12, 2018, saying, "This chapter is now closed." Chariton settled the matter with TYT. On January 18, 2018, HuffPost fully removed their contributor blogging platform due to misuse and unverifiable postings.
