= John Iadarola =

American pundit and news commentator (born 1983)

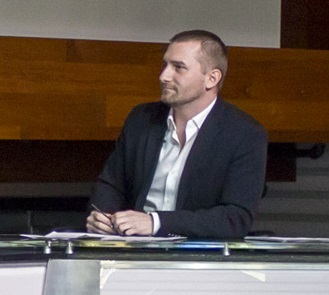
- Iadarola in February 2014
- Born: February 5, 1983 (age 43); Bridgeport, Connecticut, U.S.
- Education: University of Connecticut; University of Texas at Austin
- Occupations: Talk show host, political pundit
- Years active: 2012–present
- Employer: The Young Turks
- Spouse: Arlene Santana (m. 2019)
- Children: 1

John Iadarola (born February 5, 1983) is an American left-wing YouTube personality, and political pundit who is a host for the online news show The Young Turks and The Damage Report. Iadarola was also the host of the docu-series True North, distributed on the go90 streaming service by Verizon.

== Career ==
In January 2012, Iadarola became the cohost of TYTUniversity (later rebranded as ThinkTank in 2015), alongside Ana Kasparian and a producer of The Young Turks. When Kasparian left TYTUniversity a few months later, he became its main host and executive producer. During this time, Iadarola also began cohosting The Young Turks and other YouTube programs such as What The Flick, TYT Sports, TwentyTwelve, The Point, Pop Trigger, and others.

In May 2013, Iadarola debuted his own independent YouTube channel, The Damage Report. Topics typically include domestic and foreign politics, media criticism, technology, and social commentary on the news of the day.

On September 25, 2013, Iadarola said on air that he is an atheist.

In 2017, John appeared as a personality on the History Channel series: “The Ultimate Guide to Sounding Smart”.

In 2017 Iadarola and co-host Chavala Madlena went on location to the Arctic to see and document the effects of climate change for the series True North a joint venture of The Young Turks and go90. Promoting the series in April 2018, Iadarola appeared with Bill Nye, the science guy and Dr. Kate Marvel.

In May 2018, TYT Network announced its inclusion in the new YouTube OTT programming service. At that time it also announced a new daily show called "The Damage Report" hosted by Iadarola. The audience of The Damage Report is collectively referred to as the "Dragon Squad". In June 2018, Iadarola was a guest on AirTalk.

== Personal life ==
Iadarola is married to Mexican-American actress and TV host, Arlene Santana.

On August 16, 2023, he announced on his Instagram page that Santana had given birth to their first child, daughter Reyna.
