= 3rd Shorty Awards =

Awards show for short-form social web media content

The 3rd Annual Shorty Awards
- Date: March 28, 2011
- Location: The Times Center, New York City
- Hosted by: Aasif Mandvi

The nomination period for the third annual Shorty Awards opened in January 2011, and ran through February 11, 2011, except for new categories that had extended nomination deadlines. There were 30 official categories, and five special categories. In addition to Real-Time Photo of the Year, for the first time the awards accepted nominations for Foursquare Mayor of the Year, Foursquare Location of the Year, Microblog of the Year on Tumblr, and a Connecting People award. The awards also introduced new Shorty Industry Awards to recognize the best uses of social media by brands and agencies. A Marketing Jury within the Real-Time Academy of Short Form Arts & Sciences judges the Shorty Industry Awards and determines the winners from among the paid entries. Winners were announced at a ceremony on March 28, 2011, hosted by Aasif Mandvi in the Times Center. Other Shorty Awards presenters were scheduled to include Kiefer Sutherland, Jerry Stiller, Anne Meara, Stephen Wallem, Miss USA 2010 Rima Fakih, and Miss Teen USA 2010 Kamie Crawford.

== Winners ==
The third annual winners by category:

Category	Winner
Best Actor	Neil Patrick Harris, @ActuallyNPH
Best Actress	Stana Katic, @Stana_Katic
Best in Apps	COLOURlovers, @colourlovers
Best in Art	One Stop Poetry, @Onestoppoetry
Best Author	Shawn Stewart, @treatwomenright & John Green, @realjohngreen
Best Celebrity	Kim Jae-joong, @mjjeje
Best Charity	The Trevor Project, @trevorproject
Best Comedian (in Conjunction with the New York Comedy Festival)	Harrison Greenbaum, @harrisoncomedy
Best Cultural Institution	Tyneside Cinema, @tynesidecinema & Science Gallery, @ScienceGallery
Best in Customer Service	Research In Motion, @BlackBerryHelp
Best in Design	Codeorama, @Codeorama
Best in Entertainment	Barney Stinson, @Broslife
Best in Fashion	Ann Li, @AnnLouieLi
Best Fan Page	Ke$ha Time, @keshastime & Hey Britney, @heybritney
Best in Finance	Slow Money, @SlowMoney
Best in Food	Epic Meal Time, @epicmealtime
Best in Gaming	Adam Montoya, @SeaNanners
Best in Government	Cory Booker, @CoryBooker
Best in Green	Mud Baron, @Cocoxochitl
Best in Humor	The Dark Lord, @Lord_Voldemort7
Best in Innovation	Rene Silva Santos, @Rene_Silva_RJ
Best Journalist	West Wing Report, @westwingreport
Best in Music	Jonas Brothers, @JonasBrothers
Best in News	Lei Seca RJ, @LeiSecaRJ & The Young Turks, @TheYoungTurks
Best Nurse	Ronivin Pagtakhan, @ronnievinn (now @loveyourselfph) & Matthew Browning, @MatthewBrowning
Best in Politics	Marina Silva, @silva_marina & The Bloggess, @TheBloggess
Best in Science	MythBusters, @MythBusters
Best Social Media Expert	Facts About Boys, @FactsAboutBoys
Best in Sports	New Orleans Saints, @Official_Saints
Best in Tech	Soldier Knows Best, @SoldierKnowBest
Best in Television	Attack of the Show, @aots & Sesame Street, @sesamestreet
Best in Travel	JD Andrews, @earthXplorer
Best in Weird	Alli Trippy @AlliTrippy & OMG I do this, too, @omgidothistoo

=== Special awards ===
Category	Winner
Real-Time Photo of the Year	Douglas H. Wheelock, @Astro_Wheels for "Moon From Space"
Connecting People	Shannon Miller, @shannonmmiller
Foursquare Location of the Year	SXSW, @SXSW
Foursquare Mayor of the Year	Baratunde Thurston, @baratunde
Microblog of the Year on Tumblr	The Daily What
