= The Young Turks =

American online news show

- Also known as: TYT
- Genre: Political commentary; News
- Created by: Cenk Uygur; Ben Mankiewicz Dave Koller
- Directed by: Jesus Godoy
- Presented by: Cenk Uygur; Ana Kasparian
- Country of origin: United States

Production
- Executive producers: Cenk Uygur; Ana Kasparian
- Producer: Jayar Jackson
- Production location: Los Angeles, California
- Camera setup: Multi-camera
- Running time: 120 minutes (including ads)

Original release
- Network: Sirius Satellite Radio/SiriusXM (2002–2010, 2017); YouTube (2005–present); Air America (2006–2008); Current TV (2011–2013); Various free ad-supported streaming television platforms (2013–present)
- Release: February 14, 2002 – present

The Young Turks (TYT) is an American progressive and left-wing populist sociopolitical news and commentary program live streamed on social media platforms YouTube and Twitch, and additionally selected television channels. TYT serves as the flagship program of the TYT Network, a multi-channel network of associated web series focusing on news and current events. TYT covers American politics, wars and conflicts around the world, sports, pop culture, and a wide array of other topics. The program was created by Cenk Uygur, Ben Mankiewicz and Dave Koller in 2002. Co-hosted by Uygur and Ana Kasparian, it is also often accompanied by various other in-studio contributors.

The Young Turks began as a radio program that premiered on February 14, 2002, on Sirius Satellite Radio before launching a web series component in 2005 on YouTube, and then later Twitch; at some point it was also carried on Air America. In addition to being carried on Twitch and YouTube, it is available on Amazon Prime Direct, iTunes, Hulu, Roku, and on social media platforms Instagram, Facebook, and X. It has spawned two spin-off television series, one airing on Current TV from 2011 to 2013 and a second which debuted on Fusion in 2016 as a limited-run program developed to cover the 2016 United States presidential election. The Young Turks also served as the subject of a documentary, entitled Mad as Hell, which was released in 2014. The network has a channel on YouTube TV.

For most of its existence, TYT relied on small grassroots financial contributions from its viewership to sustain itself as an independent news organization. However, in 2017 TYT sought to expand its media network and hire more staff through various venture capital fundraising efforts which raised $20 million. The Young Turks is the second longest-running online news and politics talk show (after The Alex Jones Show started in 1999).

== Format ==
The Young Turks live streams for up to three hours, with its story selection and associated commentary broken up by format. Issues that the show focuses on include national political news, the influence of money in the political process, drug policy, social security, the privatization of public services, climate change, the influence of religion, abortion and reproductive rights, civil rights and issues of injustice towards people of color and sexual minorities, sexual morality, and the influence of corporations, neutrality and establishment political thought on traditional news media. The program maintains a liberal/progressive ideology in its political commentary. Co-creator and host Cenk Uygur describes himself as an "independent progressive" and asserts that the show is aimed at the "98 percent 'not in power'" and what he describes as the 60 percent of Americans who hold progressive views.

The two-hour main show is usually hosted by Uygur and Ana Kasparian, with a rotating cast of other 'progressive' co-hosts, including John Iadarola, Jayar Jackson, and more. The first hour usually focuses on American politics, foreign policy and breaking news headlines. The second hour generally provides social commentary on a wide range of topics, both domestic and foreign. The program also features a post-game show, in which Uygur and Kasparian discuss their personal lives. Uygur has regular bits and on-air interaction with other staff members who create and run the show, including among others Jesús Godoy, Dave Koller, Jayar Jackson and Steve Oh.

Each Friday, The Young Turks features a panel of guests from the worlds of politics, journalism, pop culture, sports and comedy – dubbed the "TYT Power Panel" – that is led by Uygur and John Iadarola in the first hour, and Ugyur and/or Jayar Jackson in the second hour. Along with Iadarola and Jackson, other fill-in hosts and recurring guests include series co-creator/contributor Ben Mankiewicz, television personality Brian Unger, Becca Frucht, Brett Erlich, Wes Clark Jr., Michael Shure, Cara Santa Maria, RJ Eskow, Gina Grad, Samantha Schacher, and Jayde Lovell.

== Production ==
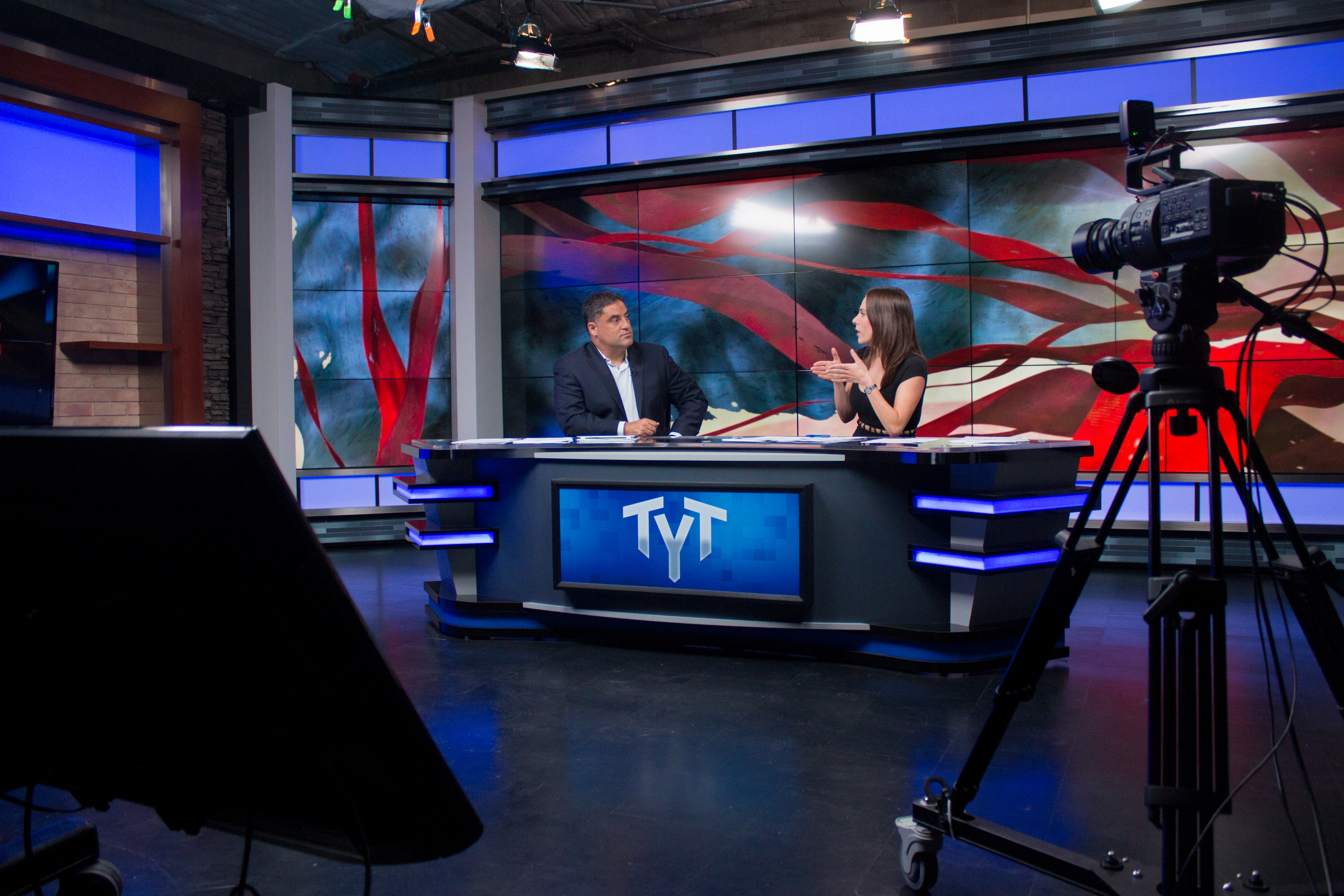
Cenk Uygur (left) and Ana Kasparian (right) presenting a show on June 23, 2015

The Young Turks is broadcast in a two-to-three hour live stream format, which airs Monday through Fridays at 3:00 p.m. Pacific Time. The program was originally based out of the living room of creator/host Cenk Uygur, but it moved production to a small office in Los Angeles after the show hired a limited staff to produce the program. When the program was given a secondary live show on Current TV in 2011, the network provided a larger studio in Los Angeles to house its television and online broadcasts; production was forced to leave the facility after Current TV was sold to Al Jazeera, prior to the network's conversion into the now-defunct generalized news service Al Jazeera America.

In 2013, The Young Turks' production staff relocated temporarily to new studio quarters at YouTube Space LA in Los Angeles. In October 2013, The Young Turks launched an Indiegogo campaign, aimed at raising $250,000 in order to build a new studio. Fundraising completed with $400,000 being raised. The program moved its production facilities and staff operations to a new studio facilities in Los Angeles later that year, with construction of their new studio being completed in June 2015. In 2017, TYT sought to expand its media network and hire more staff through various venture capital fundraising efforts that raised $20-million.

== History ==
=== Radio program ===
The Young Turks was originally developed as a radio talk show that was similar in format to a Los Angeles-based public access television program that Cenk Uygur had hosted, titled The Young Turk. With the help of friend Ben Mankiewicz (with whom he had previously worked), his childhood friend Dave Koller, and Jill Pike, Uygur began The Young Turks as a radio program in February 2002 on Sirius Satellite Radio.

In 2006, the program received attention for its 99-hour "Live on Air Filibuster," conducted during Congressional hearings for the nomination of Samuel Alito to the U.S. Supreme Court. Hosts including Thom Hartmann and John Amato filled in during the event, to allow the show's regular hosts and contributors to rest or take breaks.

Prior to signing a distribution deal to carry the program on Air America in 2006, the show was broadcast on Sirius Satellite Radio, on Sirius Left 143 and later 146, airing weekdays from 6:00 to 9:00 pm. Eastern Time; a day-behind rebroadcast of the program aired on Sirius Talk Central 148 weekday afternoons from 12:00 to 2:00 pm. Eastern. Being carried exclusively on Sirius for several years, The Young Turks was the first show to air exclusively on Sirius Left that was not distributed through a syndication network. TYT was also carried by KFH (1330 AM and 98.7 FM, now KNSS (AM) and KNSS-FM) in Wichita, Kansas each weeknight from 7:00 to 9:00 p.m. Central Time and webcast by RadioPower.org.

On February 2, 2009, TYT was removed from the broadcast schedule of America Left, a progressive talk channel carried on Sirius/XM Channel 167, and replaced by an additional hour of The Bill Press Show. The program returned to Sirius/XM on March 16, 2009. In late 2010, TYT announced through its Facebook page that it would discontinue carrying the program on Sirius/XM Satellite Radio; the last edition of The Young Turks to be carried on the service aired on November 19, 2010. TYT rejoined Sirius/XM in 2017 with the show being run on SiriusXM Progress.

=== Web series ===
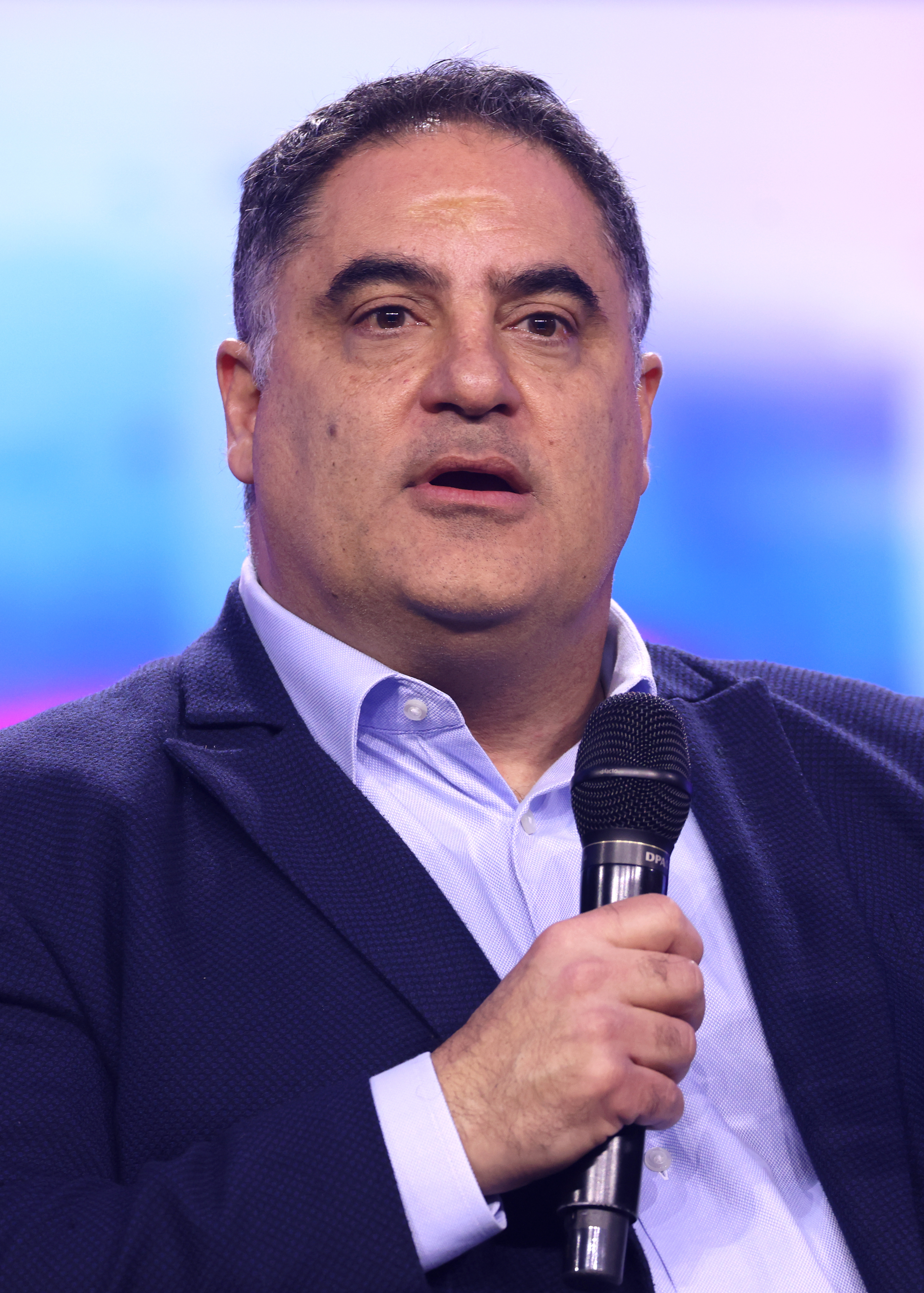
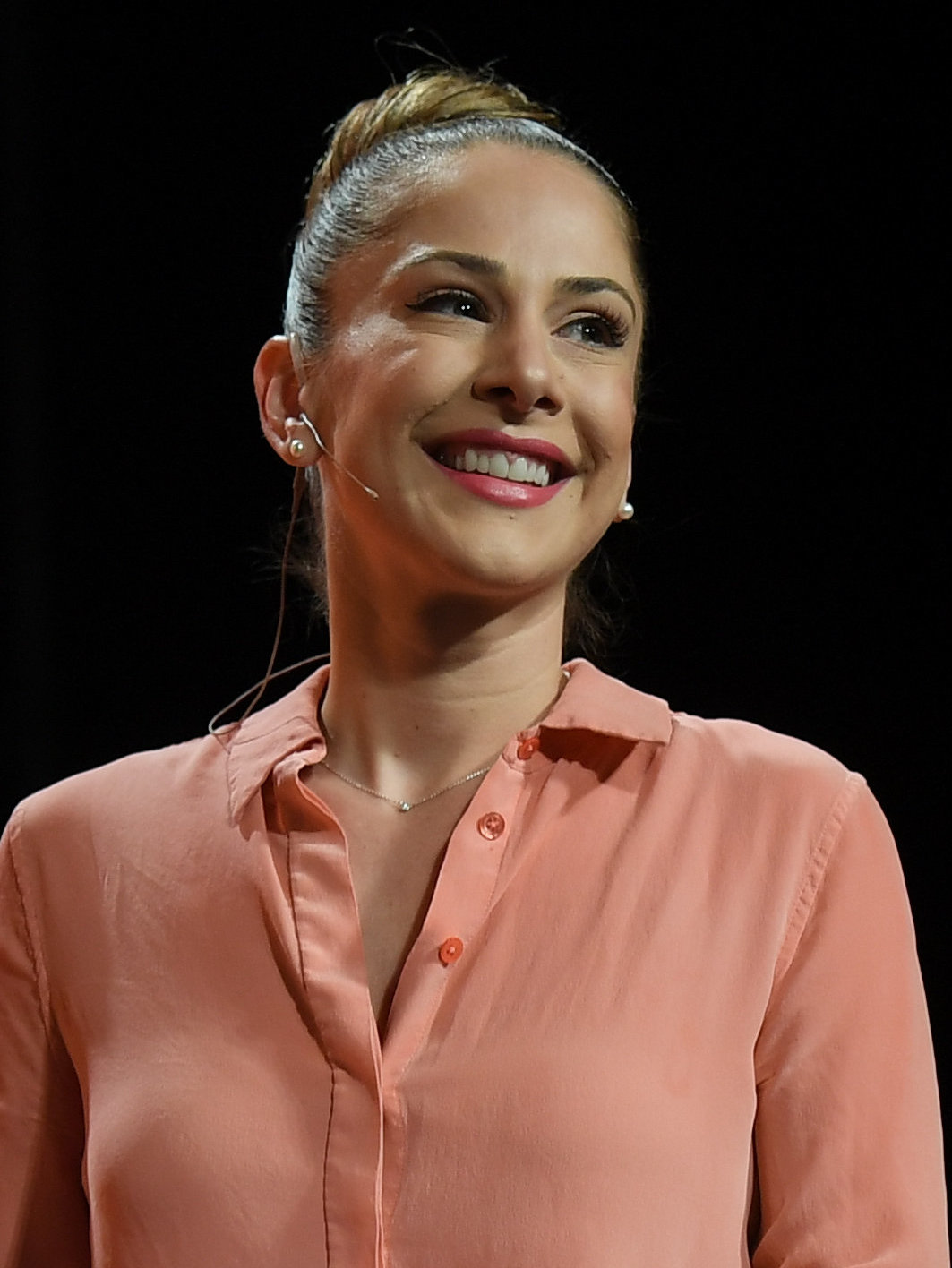
Cenk Uygur (top, 2024) and Ana Kasparian (bottom, 2017) host the web series.

The Young Turks was the first daily streaming online talk show, having begun airing in that format in 2006, with an official website on the internet and a channel hosted on YouTube. The show provides in-depth coverage on politics, news topics, current events, and other issues.

In August 2007, Ben Mankiewicz left the show to serve as a contributor for TMZ's syndicated entertainment news program TMZ on TV. At roughly the same time, Jill Pike left to pursue a job in Washington, D.C. Ana Kasparian, then working as an intern for the program, was hired to do pop culture-focused segments. Mankiewicz eventually returned to The Young Turks as a regular correspondent.

During the 2008 elections, the show developed close ties to Brave New Films. The program aired commercials for the independent film production company and featured actors including Robert Greenwald and Jonathan Kim as guests.

The success of TYT is due to a large extent of their shift from radio to the internet through the broadcast of programming content on online platforms. Uygur and co-host Kasparian applied a populist left branding and programming strategy that made TYT a successful global online organization, with larger numbers of YouTube subscribers and viewers than several other notable news networks like FOX, MSNBC, and CNN. The presence of TYT on YouTube has given the network a platform to democratize production of content and practices associated with its online distribution through an ability to share, comment and like material on its channel. Through likes and shares of TYT content on many online platforms, audience members have become a "virtual word of mouth" expanding the network's reach to other people with similar views and stimulating the growth of the TYT community.

Support by viewers for alternative media outlets like TYT adopting new technology has meant the network was able to overcome being a small sized organization of the traditional alternative media landscape. The emergence of TYT in the digital era has resulted in fewer operational costs regarding organizing and communication. TYT nonetheless has relied on small grassroots financial contributions from its viewers that gave it the ability to emerge as an alternative media organization that does not advocate for the interests of corporations. The financial contributions TYT received went to renting a studio, and to purchase production equipment and furniture. By 2010, TYT employed people and maintained a budget resembling the size of a small newspaper.

On July 30, 2013, The Young Turks launched a TYT Network app on Roku, which features much of the same content that is already available for free through the program's YouTube channel, which has over 4.2 million subscribers and generates 50 million monthly views. The network is among the few online channels to generate more than 1 billion views since launching on YouTube, which does not market a channel on the Roku app store. Young Turks COO Steve Oh acknowledged that making the TYT Network available on Roku was the first part of a strategy to continue the network's growth, regardless of what medium in which its viewers are watching its content, with the intent to figure out a way to monetize its programming through multiple distribution channels, rather than relying on one or two larger channels (such as YouTube or cable television distribution). The network also announced plans to unveil native apps for iOS and Android devices. Oh also said that the network's representatives were speaking with other media platforms about expanding its programming.

In April 2014, The Young Turks began offering its content on Hulu. With this, it began providing a condensed 30-minute version of the program featuring excerpts from the full two-hour daily show, along with a 30-minute weekly version of its daily pop-culture show PopTrigger, with other shows being added shortly afterward. Oh stated on the Hulu launch that, "as TYT Network has grown from a single show to an entire network, we've consistently found ways to bring our shows to more people[..] We've long admired Hulu as a leader of online video and both parties saw an opportunity to bring digitally-native politics and pop culture talk shows to Hulu's audience." He also stated that the company is pitching shows to cable network, but had no immediate plans to revive a television broadcast as either a relaunched program or a show similar in format to the one it formerly produced for Current TV.

The website's yearly revenue was roughly US$3 million in 2013. According to Cenk Uygur, "about a third of the revenue comes from subscriptions, and the rest comes from YouTube ads." At the time, the company maintained a staff of 30 employees. In 2014, the company received a $4 million investment from Roemer, Robinson, Melville & Co., LLC, a private equity firm led by Republican former Louisiana Governor Buddy Roemer. In December 2016, TYT Network launched a crowdfunding campaign aiming to raise US$2 million for the hiring of four further investigative teams. In May 2017, the aim was met. In August 2017, it was announced that The Young Turks have raised $20 million in venture-capital from 3L Capital, WndrCo (owned by businessman Jeffrey Katzenberg), Greycroft, and e.ventures. TYT said that it would use the funds to "hire additional management execs and creative talent, as well as enhance its subscription-video offering and expand marketing initiatives". Shawn Colo, managing partner of 3L Capital, joined the TYT Network's board.

TYT operates under a strategy of diversifying its finances that involves the airing of socially responsible advertisements, offering subscriptions for TYT membership, selling its own merchandise and other investments. Among its advertising partners is Aspiration Bank, an organization involved in "socially conscious and sustainable banking services" and whom TYT presents as different from other banks and their fossil fuel and campaign financing investments. Due to popular demand from viewers, TYT established an online outlet selling its own label branded merchandise, such as t-shirts, that are often designed and voted upon through the input of its audience. Its online subscription membership has two plans, "insider" offering full web content access and discounts, and "activist", offering additional access to its townhalls and political events.

After the 2016 election, TYT fundraised for small grassroots donations among its members, raising thousands of dollars and created a media division named TYT Investigates devoted to investigative journalism with the aim to hold people with power to account. Operating as a watchdog outfit, TYT Investigates investigative journalists report on issues such as inequalities in the economic system, power held by corporations, and other topics sidelined by traditional media like the views of ordinary citizens at political events. For example, TYT journalist Emma Vigeland has attended President Donald Trump's political rallies and interviewed supporters.

In November 2017, TYT fired field reporter Jordan Chariton over sexual assault allegations made against him by The Huffington Post. Chariton denied the accusations, considered legal action, and later settled the matter with TYT. In mid-December 2017, Politico reported that TYT was courting former CBS Evening News anchor Dan Rather to host a news show. On January 21, 2018, TYT confirmed that it will show The News with Dan Rather, a half-hour "untraditional evening newscast" weekly on Mondays in the time slot before the main Young Turks show.

=== Linear channel and unionization ===
On May 17, 2018, The Young Turks launched a 24-hour linear channel on YouTube TV which includes all of TYT's current shows and four new shows called The Damage Report, "#NoFilter","The Happy Half Hour" and "Old-School Sports". The channel has since been made available on The Roku Channel and Xumo as well.

In late February 2020, the International Alliance of Theatrical Stage Employees (IATSE) sought to unionize the production and post-production staff at TYT. Uygur urged his employees not to join a union. He said that TYT is a small media organization and the move would endanger its financial viability; however, the network supported its workers holding a secret ballot to unionize. Employees expressed support for an open ballot and a bargaining process followed. On April 9, 2020, nine of fifteen members voted in favor to have their own union and unionize with IATSE, with the majority decision being approved by TYT.

In December 2024, TYT contributor and mayor of Enfield, North Carolina, Mondale Robinson, resigned live on air over what he viewed as Uygur and Kasparian's shift away from progressive principles and embrace of the Make America Great Again movement and conservative personalities like Glenn Beck.

== Reception ==
In a September 2006 article, Paul Bedard, a U.S. News & World Report contributor, wrote that TYT is "the loudly liberal counter to the right-leaning presets on my Sirius Satellite Radio." In 2014, The Independent, a British newspaper, said it was "the most-watched online news show in the world."

The network is reliant on its multimedia platforms to attract online viewers and its audience are "young, educated, affluent and politically interested" people who consume news from online sources. As a result of ongoing TYT membership drives, its base of subscribed members has grown numbering 32,000 in 2019. Per month, the media outlet receives 200 million views. On YouTube, its main show, The Young Turks, has more than 4.7 million subscribers. Over 12 million viewers (2019) are subscribed to its multiple online channels. TYT has become one of the largest watched online networks, with its videos seen over 8 billion times (2019). Its millennial viewership ranks the network first for news and politics across its online platforms.

=== Awards and nominations ===
The Young Turks has won and been nominated for numerous Internet content awards, including, but not limited to the following:

- In 2009, the program won in the political category at the Podcast Awards, and won for "Best Political News Site" at the Mashable Open Web Awards.
- In 2010, it was nominated for a Streamy Award for "Best News or Political Web Series" and the "Audience Choice Award for Best Web Series".
- In 2011, the program won in the News category at the Third Annual Shorty Awards, and won for "Best News and Political Series" at the 2011 Webby Awards.
- In 2012, it won in the Best Video Podcast category at the Podcast Awards .
- In 2013, the program was nominated for two Streamy Awards in the Best News and Culture Series and Audience Choice Award for Series of the Year categories.
- In 2015, The Young Turks also won a Streamy Award in the News and Culture category.
- In 2017, TYT won the Shorty Awards Audience Honor for the Best in Overall YouTube Presence.

Other awards won by The Young Turks in the 2010s were "Best Political News Site" and the "People's Voice Webby Award" in all five of its categories.

=== Name controversy ===
The name Young Turks has been criticized due the historical Young Turks movement's association with the Committee of Union and Progress, which committed the Armenian genocide during World War I. Activists have opposed the name due to the Armenian community's transgenerational trauma alongside Turkey's continued denial of the Armenian genocide. They have compared it to naming an organization after the Hitler Youth; Alex Galitsky, who works for the Armenian National Committee of America, said, "If a group decided to call themselves 'the Young Nazis', and pitched themselves as a disruptor or anti-establishment news outlet, people would be rightly outraged".

Criticism escalated after a 1991 article that Uygur wrote for The Daily Pennsylvanian, in which he denied the Armenian genocide, resurfaced. In 2016, he posted a statement on TYT's website in which he retracted the article: "My mistake at the time was confusing myself for a scholar of history, which I most certainly am not. I don't want to make the same mistake again, so I am going to refrain from commenting on the topic of the Armenian Genocide, which I do not know nearly enough about." He recognized the genocide during a broadcast in 2019. Nonetheless, TYT has rejected calls to change its name. Uygur noted that "Young Turk" is a popular colloquialism referring to a young radical who fights the status quo, and said the name was not intended as a historical reference. TYT's website includes a disclaimer that the name "does not refer to any specific, historical incarnation of the Young Turks". In 2017, it shut down a symposium at California State University after an audience member confronted its hosts about the name.

== Viewer statistics ==
On April 20, 2013, The Young Turks announced that its YouTube channel had received over a billion video views. In September 2018, the company launched a membership drive, reporting the number of members to be around 27,000. As of August 2018, TYT had approximately 27,000 paying subscribers online.

As of September 2017, the program's YouTube channel averaged two million views. By August 2016, Uygur reported that the channel had more than 23,000 subscribers. By October 2016, the number of views for the TYT Network's YouTube channel had surpassed 3 billion.

== Television spin-offs ==
=== The Young Turks with Cenk Uygur ===
The first linear television incarnation of the program began as an hour-long show which premiered on Current TV on December 5, 2011. Co-created and hosted by Cenk Uygur (who executive produced the series with original program co-creator Dave Koller, with Jesus Godoy, Jayar Jackson and Mark Register serving as producers), the program was co-presented by Ana Kasparian with Ben Mankiewicz, Michael Shure, Brian Unger, Wes Clark Jr., and RJ Eskow as contributors and correspondents. It was filmed at studio facilities in Culver City, an Los Angeles suburb.

Current TV announced the launch of a separate television broadcast of The Young Turks on September 20, 2011, with the program intending to air Monday through Friday evenings at 7:00 pm. Eastern Time beginning in the fourth quarter of 2011. It was the second news and opinion program to air on Current, alongside Countdown with Keith Olbermann, and was part of a strategy to refocus the network's prime time schedule around progressive talk programming (which was followed by the debut of The War Room with Jennifer Granholm in January 2012). According to the show's website, the show was titled The Young Turks with Cenk Uygur to differentiate itself from the popular web series. For two years, the two separate shows were produced each Monday through Thursday, with a one-hour break between the production airtimes of the television and web shows. In a press release, representatives for Current described TYT as "a group of progressive, outspoken journalists and commentators discussing politics and pop culture" and Uygur as bringing a "uniquely progressive and topical commentary about politics and pop culture."

On January 2, 2013, Current TV was sold to Qatar-owned broadcaster Al Jazeera Media Network, which announced plans to reorganize the channel as Al Jazeera America, focusing on world news and investigative content with a more neutral tone; with the move, the channel would discontinue its talk programming slate, including The Young Turks with Cenk Ugyur, which ended its run on Current TV on August 15, 2013, shortly before the network's relaunch.

In an interview with the Los Angeles Times, Uygur commented that with the discontinuance of the television broadcast, he was relieved to move on and focus on his web show and the TYT Network site, expressing that he had been "exhausted from doing the two shows at once" and that he was glad to put his energies there, as he believes that the future of media will gravitate towards online content. Uygur also noted that he talked with Al Jazeera after the company bought Current, reaching a mutual agreement not to continue with the television broadcast due to the change in ideological tone that Al Jazeera America would maintain. However, members of The Young Turks' on-air contributing staff including Shure (who served as a political and general assignment contributor), Cara Santa Maria (part of TechKnow) and Mankiewicz (who worked as a movie critic), regularly appeared on Al Jazeera America. The Young Turks also maintain a partnership with Al Jazeera's digital channel AJ+, in an arrangement first announced in March 2015.

=== The Young Turks on Fusion ===
The Young Turks returned to television with a weekly, hour-long program on Fusion, The Young Turks on Fusion, which premiered on September 12, 2016, for a twelve-week limited run. Hosted by Ana Kasparian and John Iadarola, the program – which was broadcast from college campuses around the United States, in a live-audience format modelled after ESPN's College GameDay – focused on coverage of the 2016 United States presidential campaign. The show also featured Cenk Uygur, Jimmy Dore, Ben Mankiewicz, Hannah Cranston, Hasan Piker, and Kim Horcher as contributors, as well as Fusion reporters and celebrity guest hosts. Piker is the nephew of Uygur and went on to become a well-known Twitch streamer and commentator in his own right.

== TYT Network ==
TYT Network
- Type: Digital linear / multi-channel network
- Country: United States
- Broadcast area: Worldwide
- Headquarters: Los Angeles, California

Programming
- Language: English

Ownership
- Owner: The Young Turks, LLC

Links
- Webcast: tyt.com/live

Availability

Streaming media
- Linear channel (United States only): Roku, Xumo, Samsung TV Plus, Local Now, FuboTV, Xfinity X1, Xfinity Flex, YouTube TV

The Young Turks has spawned a multi-channel network of associated web series and shows, known as the TYT Network.

Some of the programs are produced in-house including:

- TYT Sports is a sports commentary program which debuted in 2011; originally hosted by Cenk Uygur, Jayar Jackson and Ben Mankiewicz. Rick Strom took over as co-host in 2013 and was replaced in 2014 by Jason Rubin and Francis Maxwell. Strom is the host of the program on TYT Sports' YouTube Channel.
- Old School – a more informal show hosted by Uygur and Mankiewicz discussing every-day topics and telling stories
- Rebel HQ is an "on-the-road" political commentary and interview program formerly hosted by reporter Jordan Chariton, which was created to cover the 2016 United States presidential campaign. The channel was primarily hosted by Emma Vigeland from 2018 until she joined The Majority Report with Sam Seder in November 2020. Segments are now produced by various TYT hosts and contributors. Formerly TYT Politics
- TYT The Conversation (formerly TYT Interviews) – an interview series conducted by various TYT hosts and contributors
- The Damage Report with John Iadarola – daily morning/early afternoon show about critical issues facing the U.S.
- Happy Half Hour with Brett Erlich – a more upbeat and lighter look at the "not bad" news of the week
- Indisputable with Dr. Rashad Richey is a daily afternoon show with Rashad Richey which focuses on delivering fact-based information with all of his signature passion and insight. As of February 2022, it is “America’s Fastest Growing Television News Show."
- The Watchlist with Jayar Jackson – Daily morning/noon show which features a must-watch list of videos of the day about news, politics, society, culture, current events, and more.
- The RevolYOUtion - An in-depth conversation with guests on tackling issues about challenging the system and crowdsourcing to make changes in today's political status.

Other shows are not produced in-house:

- The Richard Fowler Show – a weekly political talk show hosted by Richard A. Fowler
- The Bill Press Show is a daily talk show hosted by Bill Press, which is broadcast online, over radio, and on Free Speech TV which became affiliated with the TYT Network in November 2016.
- Acronym TV is a commentary program focusing on policy and national security issues, hosted by Dennis Trainor Jr.
- Absurdity Today – a news satire program, hosted by Juliana Forlano
- The Undercurrent is a talk program hosted by Lauren Windsor, which covers a broad variety of in-depth topics, and includes interviews with politicians, media figures and opinion makers, as well as documentaries.
- The Lip TV – a commentary program which maintains a live and unscripted format with a panel of experts on varying subjects of focus
- Truth Mashup – a weekly Canadian comedy show, co-hosted by Bree Essrig (who formerly co-hosted Pop Trigger) and comedian and media activist Ron Placone
- ScIQ is a bi-weekly infotainment series hosted by Jayde Lovell, an Australian-born neurophysiologist and director of science PR consulting firm ReAgency, which explores scientific topics.

Programs produced for the TYT Network which aare no longer in production include:

- thetopvlog – a series of vlogs by liberal political commentators which TYT helped launch in June 2010
- twenTYTwelve – a political interview and commentary program, hosted by Michael Shure which was launched in October 2011 to cover the 2012 United States elections
- TYT Now – a commentary program which was hosted by columnist Tina Dupuy and Tim Mihalsky, which ran from May to August 2011
- WMB – a commentary program hosted by Ben Mankiewicz, Michael Shure, and Wes Clark Jr., which ran from May to June 2011
- Reality Bites Back – a reality television-focused review series, hosted by Jacki Bray and Misty Kingma, which ran from May to July 2011
- ThinkTank is a science and social commentary program which originated in 2011 as TYT University, before relaunching under its current format in 2014; hosted by Hannah Cranston alongside a rotation of guest co-hosts (including original co-host John Iadarola, who diminished his role on ThinkTank during 2017), the program deals with new facts, discoveries and perspectives on the world and people.
- The Point – a current affairs panel show, hosted by Ana Kasparian which debuted in 2011, but has been on hiatus since January, 2016
- Pop Trigger was an infotainment show, hosted by Brett Erlich and Grace Baldridge with a rotating slate of guest co-hosts which provides intelligent conversation on pop culture news. It ran until August 2018.
- Murder with Friends – Baldridge invites guests to talk about some of history's most notorious murderers
- Nerd Alert was a show which focuses on news about technology, gaming, movies and online geek culture; hosted by Kim Horcher, the program spun off from a segment which originated on TYT University. It ran until August, 2018.
- The News with Dan Rather is a weekly 30-minute rundown of current events with commentary hosted by ex-CBS News lead anchor Dan Rather. It is filmed in Rather's personal office in New York.
- What the Flick?! was a film review series which began in 2010; it is hosted by Ben Mankiewicz, Christy Lemire, Matt Atchity and Alonso Duralde. Guest critics have included Robert Abele, William Bibbiani, Grae Drake, Tim Grierson, Amy Nicholson, Witney Seibold, Dave White, and April Wolfe. It ran until August 2018.
- Aggressive Progressives is a weekly political talk and satire show which debuted in August 2016; it is hosted by Steve Oh. It was co-hosted by Jimmy Dore from August 2016 until Dore's departure from the TYT Network in April 2019.
- Styleogue is a fashion and lifestyle program which debuted in 2014, which is dedicated to affordable fashion.
- TYT Investigates is the investigative reporting division of The Young Turks hosted by Michael Tracey, Ryan Grim, David Sirota, Eric Byler, Dylan Ratigan, Ken Klippenstein, and other reporters.
- #NoFilter – analysis and commentary from TYT host Kasparian
- Old-School Sports – TYT Sports host Rick Strom & BlackSportsOnline Owner Robert Littal revisit and analyze classic games and rivalries.
- Power Hour with Nina Turner was hosted by former Ohio state senator Nina Turner and Uygur from September 2021 through January 2022. It is on hiatus as Turner runs for election to Congress in Ohio's 11th congressional district.
- Unbossed with Nina Turner – weekday afternoon news show, launched on Oct. 17, 2022
- The Twitchuation Room hosted by Francesca Fiorentini is exclusively on TYT's Twitch channel, a light-hearted weekly show with each episode focusing on a specific topic. It is a counterpart to a weekly talk/podcast show The Bitchuation Room on her YouTube channel.
- Deep Dive with Jordan Uhl – Exclusively on TYT's Twitch channel, Jordan Uhl takes a ‘deep dive’ analysis on the news of the day and reacts to stories he finds on Twitter.
- Wosnia – Exclusively on TYT's Twitch channel, host Wosny Lambre scours the internet to bring you his commentary on the top stories in News, Sports and Entertainment.
- RayyActions – Exclusively on TYT's Twitch channel, host Rayyvanna looks at and reacts to current events and brings the audience stories to enjoy on a weekly basis.
- Galaxy Brain with Ben Carollo – Exclusively on TYT's Twitch channel, host Ben Carollo breaks down complex topics every week while engaging with the audience.
- Game Busters – Exclusively on TYT's Twitch channel, the show closes out the week with the audience getting to participate and sabotage the hosts' gaming live on Twitch.

Programs no longer produced or owned by the TYT Network, but are still in production:

- The Breakfast Club – a morning radio show syndicated from WWPR-FM on iHeartMedia, hosted by Charlamagne tha God, Angela Yee, and DJ Envy; affiliated with the TYT Network from 2014 to 2019
- The Humanist Report (broke away in 2023) – a progressive political YouTube channel and podcast hosted by political scientist Mike Figueredo which began in 2015
- The Rubin Report (broke away in August 2015) is a formerly progressive political news talk show, hosted by Dave Rubin which premiered in 2013; the program moved to RYOT News in 2015, and later to Ora TV. The show and host since shifted to conservatism.
- The David Pakman Show – a political and current events radio show, hosted by David Pakman which began in 2005 and was affiliated with the TYT Network from 2012 to 2015
- The Jimmy Dore Show – a commentary program hosted by Dore, a stand-up comedian and political commentator, which began in 2009 and was affiliated with the TYT Network from 2009 to 2019
- The Logical Leftist (also known as Waldorf Nation; formerly known as Around the Nation with Jeff Waldorf and TYT Nation) – a talk show hosted by Waldorf
- The Majority Report with Sam Seder – a news and politics show hosted by Sam Seder, which is a video broadcast of Seder's daily online radio program
- The Ring of Fire (Formerly Go Left TV) is a multi-media outlet for the latest progressive news, commentary, and analysis hosted by Farron Cousins, Mike Papantonio and Seder.
- Secular Talk – a daily political talk show hosted by Kyle Kulinski, which is also broadcast on the Secular Talk Radio and BlogTalkRadio online networks

== Political activity ==
TYT promotes itself as the "Home of Progressives". Uygur has stated that "TYT values journalistic objectivity". TYT commentary generates "hybridized content". This involves TYT referencing news from mainstream sources and providing its own content analysis by connecting it to different narratives and discourses related to the social realities of its audience. The network's commentary has generated counter narratives in relation to traditional policy discussions. TYT places news in its context and connects it to the decision-making process. By engaging with social movements, the station has called on its audience to become part of its "TYT army". The network uses its platforms for advocacy, such as calling for its audience to participate in the political process and give candidates support.

As part of new media, TYT coverage conveys the frustration and discontent held by youth with the political system. Progressive social policies and liberal values are promoted through commentary by TYT. Examples include TYT calling for gun control and the need to mitigate violence by police during its coverage of the 2018 Parkland school shooting. In similar coverage of shootings, TYT has provided information on gun- and crime-related homicide numbers and placed into context the laws, police training and additional factors that worsen the situation. Hosts on TYT advocate for unionization in large companies and the sharing of profits with their workers. The network has spoken out against corruption in politics and for the need to remove corporate donations out of the political system. In particular, TYT shares the point of view that Israel controls the U.S. politics through donors for most of the members of Congress. The station has been critical of what it regards as a "corporate coup" in the US. TYT has criticized politicians from the US Democratic Party for alleged attachment to financial interests and for appearing to be progressive. Hosts on TYT have called for the Democratic Party to undergo a revitalization process. The network has been critical of the Trans-Pacific Partnership (TPP) trade deal and its supporters like Hillary Clinton, whereas TYT approved of Senator Bernie Sanders's opposition to it. The station has defended the whistleblower WikiLeaks organization and its data disclosures on several issues such as the TPP, the DNC email leak and the Hillary Clinton email controversy. TYT was skeptical about claims of alleged Russian interference in the 2016 US presidential election.

The station uses traditional and online media platforms regarding political action and mobilization for citizen engagement with institutional politics. For example, TYT townhalls are hosted in local communities involving a moderator asking questions of the expert panel followed by audience questions, with the events streamed on YouTube and on-demand web access for its subscription membership. Viewers also have the option to send video questions to the network if they are unable to be present at the townhall. TYT townhall events involve detailed commentary by hosts and guests on political topics ranging from personal experiences to abstract notions on issues of concern that serve to connect their audience and lived experiences with politics. During the 2016 US presidential election, TYT hosted townhalls with Sanders and Green party candidate Jill Stein. In the late 2010s, other TYT townhalls were held with Sanders on the climate change crisis. Several hosts for TYT have expressed support for Sanders.

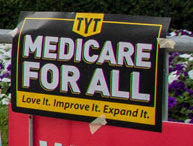
TYT sign supporting Medicare for All

The network supports political candidates who are from the same ideological persuasion. Following the 2016 presidential election, Uygur co-founded Justice Democrats, an organization that seeks to get progressive candidates elected into office. During the US mid-term elections (2018), the network endorsed all candidates from the Justice Democrats (JD). TYT was the first network to give airtime to progressive candidates such as Alexandria Ocasio-Cortez to discuss policies and contrast themselves from electoral opponents on its shows like Rebel HQ, a half an hour interview based program created in 2017. In 2018, TYT also featured other progressive political candidates on Rebel HQ such as Richard Ojeda during his congressional run, gubernatorial candidates Cynthia Nixon who ran in New York State and Christine Hallquist in Vermont to discuss their policies.

As a platform for online and offline civic engagement and political action, Rebel HQ offers information about a candidate, their website and campaign. The show informs viewers on how they can contact politicians, assist progressive candidates affiliated or unaffiliated with the Justice Democrats through donations or to participate by volunteering, canvassing and attending events like rallies in local communities. TYT's online platforms facilitate the encouragement of civic participation with the political system that in 2018 assisted Justice Democrats in getting 7 congressional victories, 25 candidates during the general election and 78 in the primaries. After Ocasio-Cortez became a congresswoman, TYT has continued to cover and defend her from slants by the political and media elite. Other Justice Democrats congressional members like Ro Khanna and Rashida Tlaib have appeared on TYT discussing progressive policies and issues.

In June 2019, during a high-profile Democratic presidential candidate campaign weekend in Iowa, TYT and a group of supporters launched the Progressive Economic Pledge campaign, challenging presidential candidates to sign. The pledge is to support higher wages, Medicare for All, Green New Deal, college for all and the end of private campaign financing.

In mid-November 2019, Uygur filed to run for Congress in California's 25th district, a seat recently vacated by the resignation of Katie Hill, an office also being pursued by former Trump campaign aide George Papadopoulos. He received 6.6% of the vote and did not advance to the runoff, which was won by Republican Mike Garcia.

On October 11, 2023, Uygur announced his campaign for president in the Democratic primary. He was kept out of the primary because he was not a natural-born American citizen.

On December 6, 2023, TYT hosted a forum featuring Democratic Party presidential primary candidates Congressman Dean Phillips, Marianne Williamson, and Cenk Uygur. Biden was invited but declined to attend. The candidates responded to the GOP debate being held in Tuscaloosa, Alabama which was scheduled to end at the same time. The discussion was moderated by John Iadarola, the main host of The Damage Report on the same network.

On January 12, 2024, NewsNation hosted a second forum featuring Phillips, Williamson, and Uygur. Biden was invited but did not attend. The discussion was moderated by Dan Abrams.

Awards
Preceded by Free Talk Live	Podcast Award for Best Political Podcast/Best Political Website; 2009	Succeeded by Free Talk Live
