= Ana Kasparian =

American political commentator (born 1986)

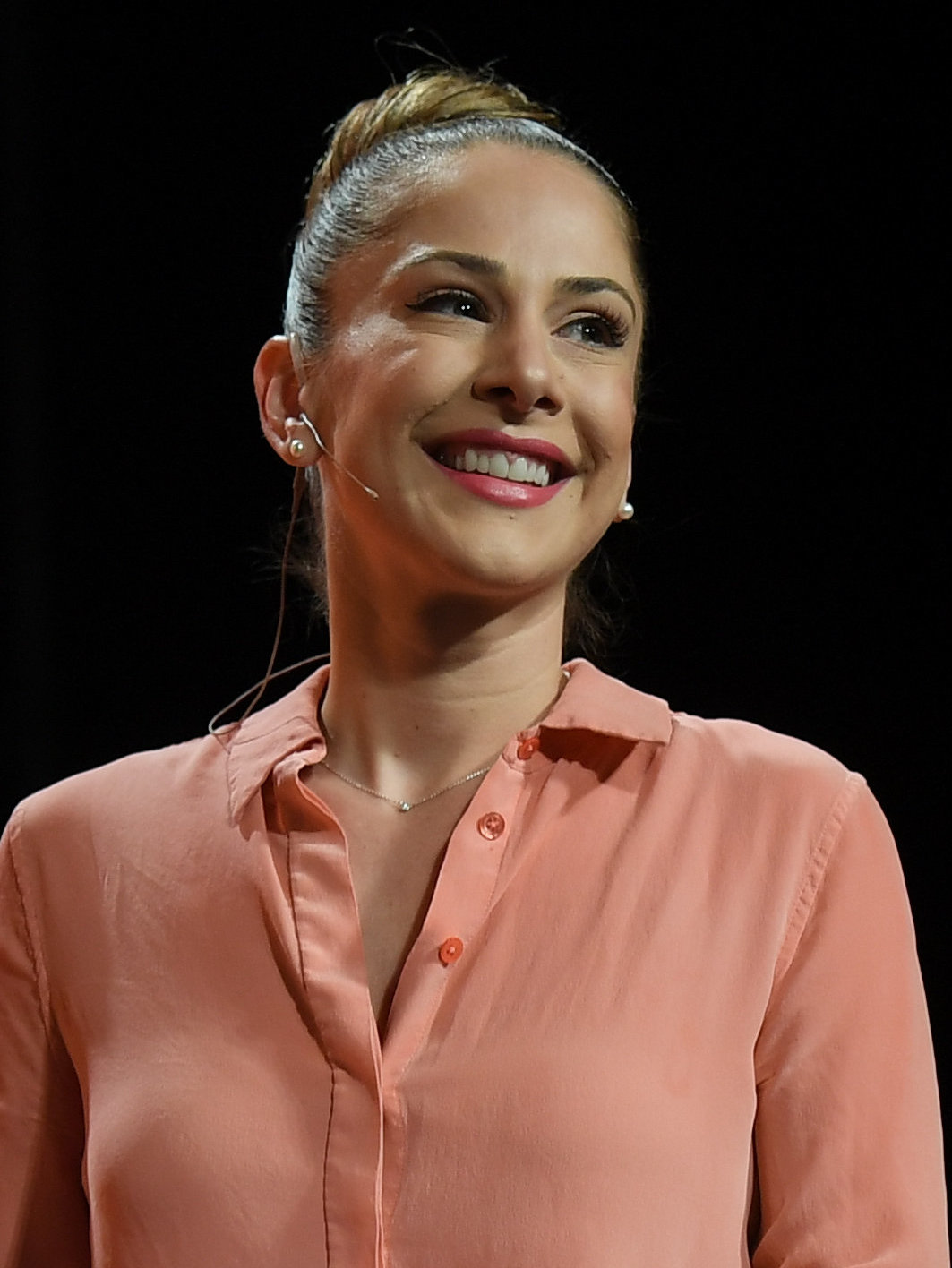
- Kasparian in 2017
- Born: Anahit Misak Kasparian; July 7, 1986 (age 40); Los Angeles, California, U.S.
- Education: California State University, Northridge (BA, MA)
- Occupations: Political commentator; media host; journalist
- Years active: 2007–present
- Known for: Political activism; co‑host and producer of The Young Turks
- Political party: Democratic (2004–2024); Independent (2024–present)
- Spouse: Christian Lopez (m. 2015)
- Kasparian's voice On the internet's impact on media coverage

Anahit Misak Kasparian (/kəˈspæriən/ kə-SPARR-ee-ən; born July 7, 1986) is an American political commentator, journalist, producer, and media host. She co-hosts and is an executive producer of The Young Turks (TYT), an online progressive news network. She also hosts TYT programs including The Point and NoFilter, and co-hosts a Jacobin YouTube show Weekends, alongside political commentators including Michael Brooks and Nando Vila.

== Early life and education ==
Kasparian was born on July 7, 1986, in Los Angeles, California, to Armenian immigrant parents and was raised in the Reseda neighborhood of the San Fernando Valley. Her paternal great-grandparents survived the Armenian genocide of 1915. Armenian was her first language, and she has stated that she learned English primarily through watching Sesame Street as a child.

From the age of three until nineteen, Kasparian studied and performed ballet, dancing professionally during her youth. She graduated from Valley Alternative Magnet High School in Van Nuys in 2004, before attending California State University, Northridge (CSUN), where she earned a Bachelor of Arts degree in journalism in 2007. She later completed a Master of Arts degree in Political Science at CSUN in 2010.

== Journalism ==
Kasparian said that seeing journalist Barbara Walters on 20/20 inspired her to get into journalism. After graduating from CSUN, she interned and later worked at CBS Radio news stations in Los Angeles, first with KFWB and then KNX. She said that she was lucky to be hired immediately after graduating, but did not like working for CBS Radio because mainstream media is "not fun" due to the "robotic work environment" where she could not say what she wanted on air or do stories that were important to her. She enrolled in a master's degree program as a "way out" of media. She has also worked with AOL News, YouTube, TidalTv and On Point.

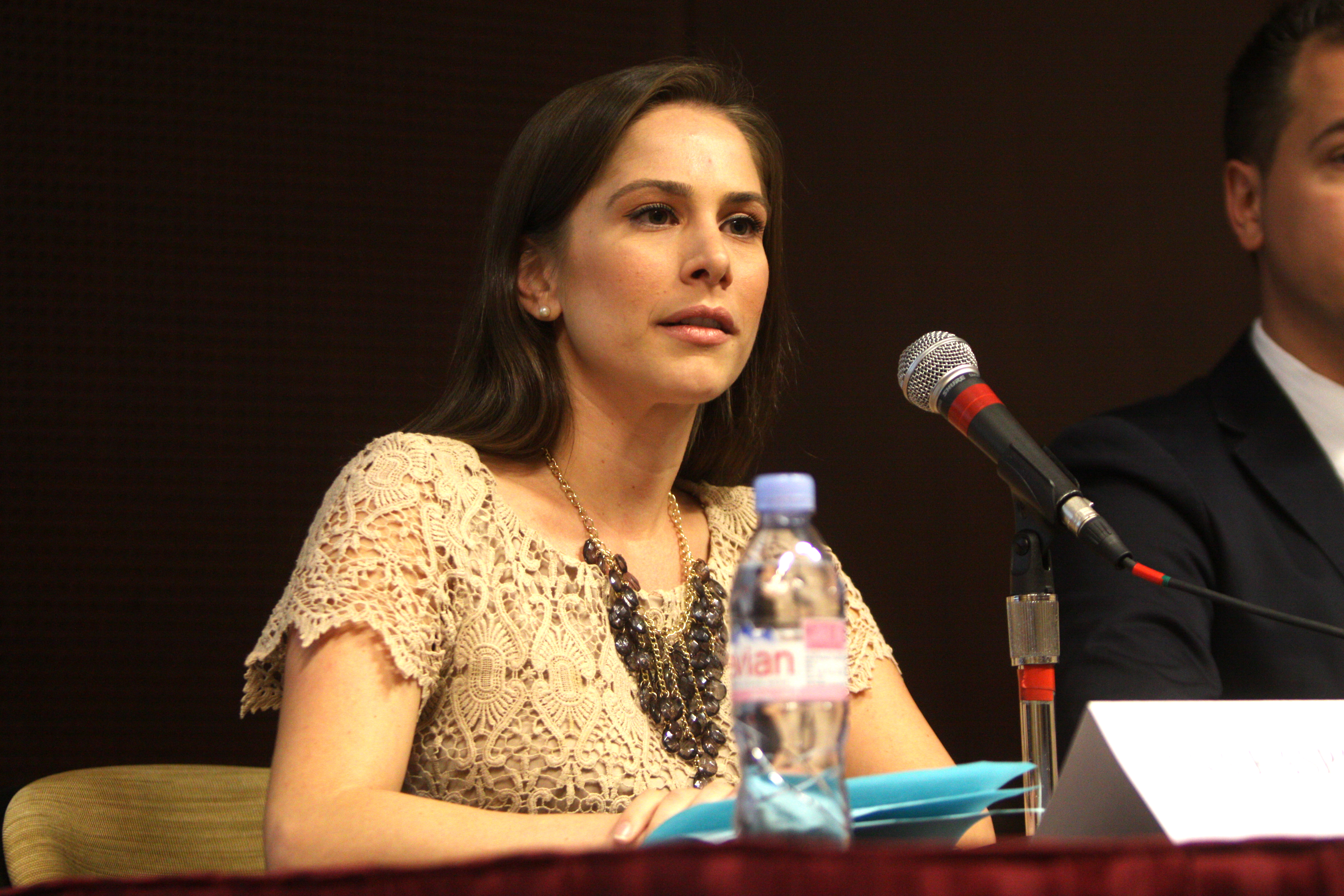
Kasparian speaking at the Young Americans for Liberty's Campus Debate at Arizona State University in Tempe, Arizona in 2012

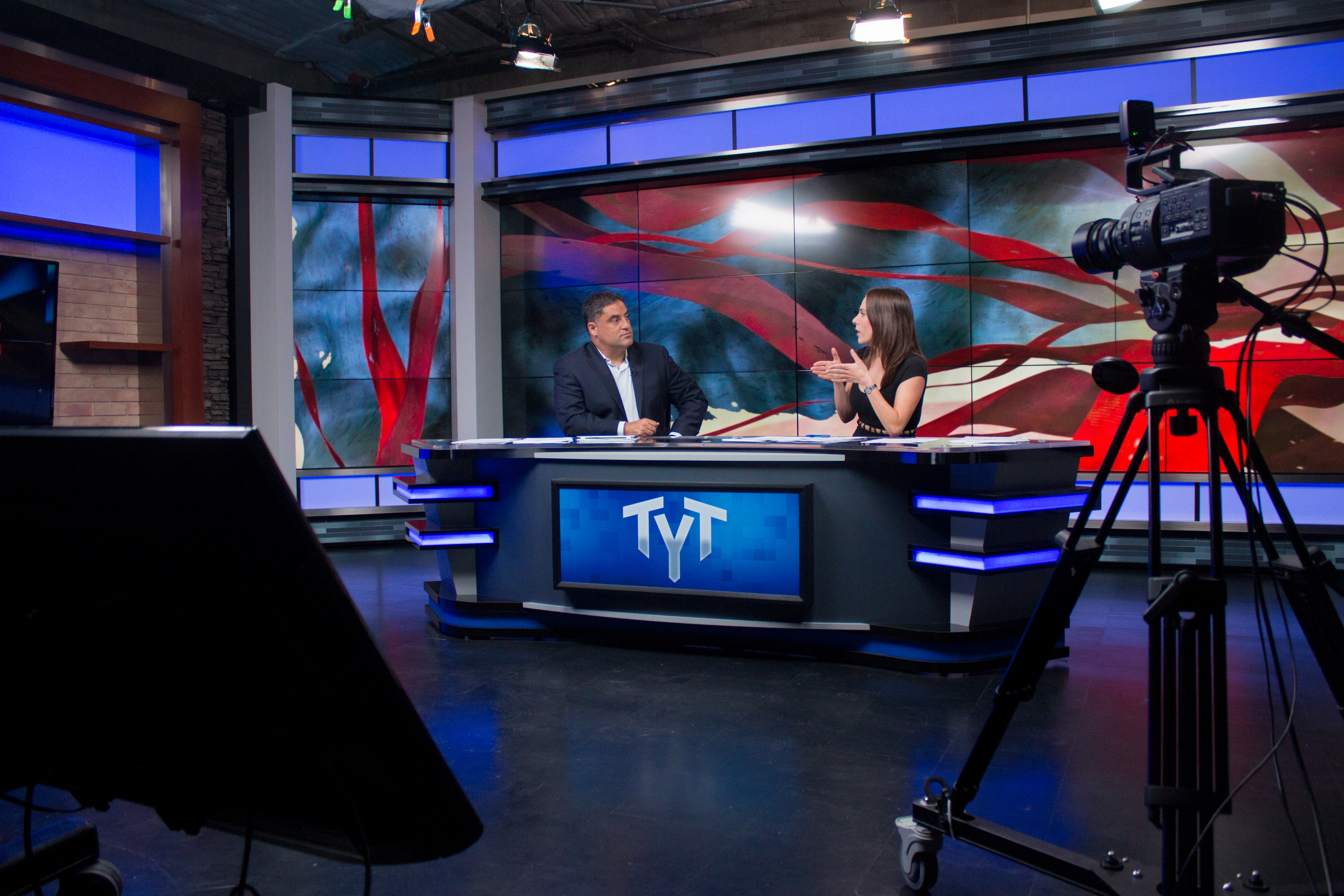
Cenk Uygur (left) and Kasparian (right) presenting The Young Turks on June 23, 2015

After filling in as host in April 2007, Kasparian became the producer and co-host with Cenk Uygur of the progressive show The Young Turks. She was at first skeptical of her new work environment as an Armenian, saying: "The Young Turks is a strange name," but after working there, the name was explained to her as: "It essentially means rebels. People who rebel against societal expectations." She liked working at The Young Turks enough that she decided to stay in media. In fact, she was supposed to leave after two weeks, but said she "kind of refused". She was first hired to do marketing, but "weaseled" her way into doing on-air segments. Kasparian described what she liked about working at TYT: "What I loved about the show was that it was unscripted. It was raw. It was just completely unfiltered." In a Forbes interview she also stated that she cannot pretend to be a "robot that's always neutral." She needs to state her opinion and sometimes "aggressively so" and TYT allowed her to do that.

She posits that young people are interested in news, but "they see network anchors as simply folks who read teleprompters," and are therefore more drawn to online media Kasparian and her co-host Uygur applied a populist left branding strategy that made TYT a successful global online organization, with larger numbers of YouTube subscribers than several other notable news networks like CNN. She co-hosted TYT University, a show focused on issues faced by university students that ran from March 15, 2011, to December 31, 2014, where she first hosted with Jayar Jackson and then John Iadarola. TYT University then turned into a show called Think Tank, debuting on January 1, 2015, with different hosts and different topics, but aimed at the same demographic. The show was hosted by John Iadarola and Hannah Cranston.

She was the main host of another TYT Network show, The Point, which was a panel-style show with a weekly roundup of news stories. Common co-hosts on The Point included political commentator Dave Rubin, science communicator Cara Santa Maria, American actor Hank Chen, and American football player Drew Carter. However, this show came to a close, releasing its last episode on January 5, 2016. She became a part-time journalist and op-ed writer at The Raw Story news outlet in May 2015. Kasparian appeared on "Take Part Live" several times in 2014, sometimes as a guest and sometimes as a co-host. She also is a weekly host on the Jacobin YouTube show Weekends, formerly co-hosted by Michael Brooks until his sudden death in July 2020.

Kasparian became a lecturer (i.e. instructor) at California State University, Northridge, and began teaching journalism in August 2013.

On May 1, 2025, it was announced that Kasparian would be joining the cast of Her Take, an online panel show with an all-woman lineup of commentators, including Jillian Michaels and Lindy Li, that is intended to be a conservative version of The View. The show was created by conservative podcaster Patrick Bet-David.

=== "The Young Turks" name criticism ===
The Young Turks name is identical to that of a Turkish political movement responsible for the Armenian genocide. Armenian activists have criticized the program's name and a spokesman for the Armenian National Committee of America has compared it to a hypothetical show broadcasting under the name "The Young Nazis". Aram Hamparian, Executive Director of the Armenian National Committee of America said about Uygur and the show's name:

Denying a genocide, belittling its survivors, and then naming your political show after its perpetrators should be troubling not only to Armenian Americans, but anyone concerned about human rights. Cenk Uygur... did just this...

In 2016, Kasparian became involved in an exchange over the name with members of the Armenian Youth Federation during an appearance at California State University, Northridge. Kasparian's appearance at a 2017 event at UCLA was protested by the UCLA Armenian Students' Association which issued a statement saying that the "Bruin Political Union and Campus Events Commission have shown that they are either not familiar with the offensive nature of the name of the organization Mrs. Kasparian represents or that they just do not care". A 2018 Playboy article by Art Tavana on the name dispute accused Kasparian of "complicity" in what he called "genocide denial". Kasparian has said that criticism of the name has led to harassment of her; in a 2020 Twitter exchange, she accused a critic of the name of perpetuating "the same lies over and over again, which of course directs harassment and disinformation toward me".

== Political views ==
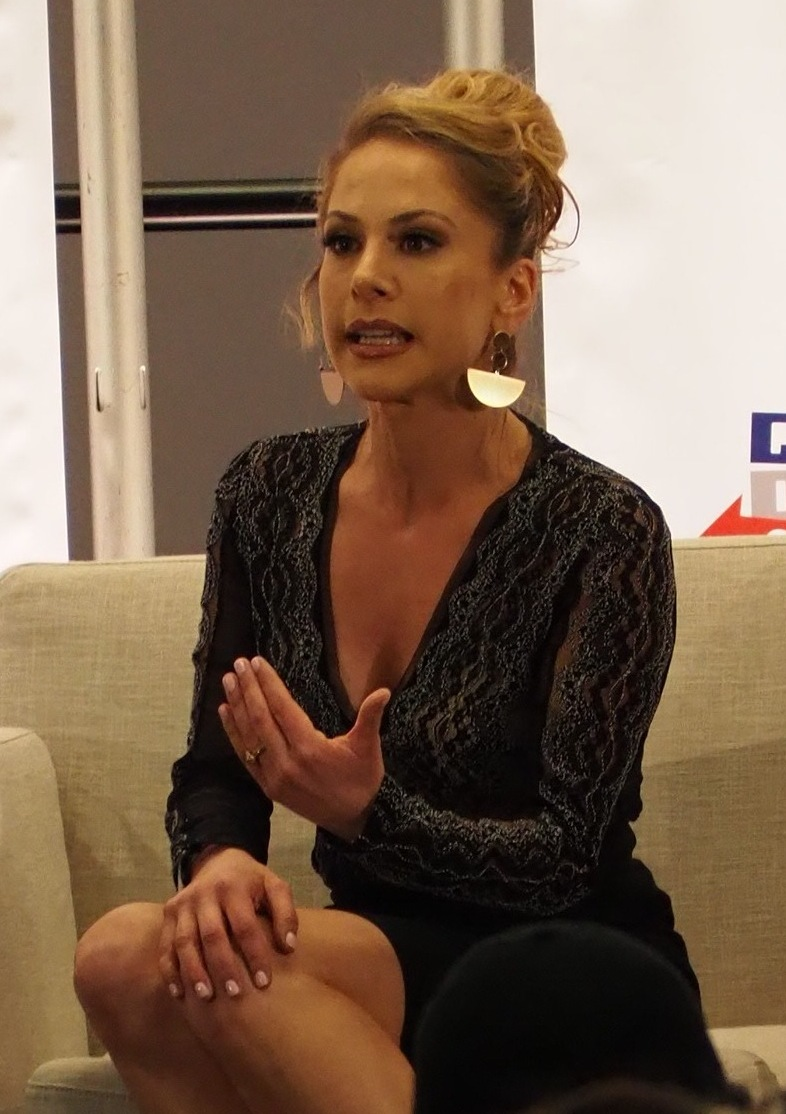
Kasparian in 2018

=== Before 2023 ===
In 2021, Kasparian described herself as an atheist who pushes for progressive values. She has advocated for criminal justice reform and has been a critic of private and for-profit prisons, calling them "hideous institutions". She has argued that these institutions create a financial incentive to keep more people in prison for longer periods of time, rather than working to rehabilitate and reintegrate them into society. She also points out that these prisons often provide substandard conditions and inadequate services and may be less accountable to the public than government-run facilities.

She has advocated for campaign finance reform to get money out of politics. In December 2016, she gave a TEDx talk on this subject explaining a path that could be taken to achieve campaign finance reform, such as limiting the amount of money that individuals and organizations can contribute to political campaigns, increasing transparency and disclosure requirements for campaign spending, and implementing public financing systems for political campaigns.

She has expressed a belief in free education for the United States, based on a conviction that access to education should be a basic right for all citizens, regardless of their socio-economic background. She has also said that she believes everyone should have access to decent, safe, and affordable housing.

She wrote in Bernie Sanders in the 2020 presidential election, reasoning that it would not matter because she lives in the reliably Democratic-voting California.

=== Since 2023 ===
Since 2023, she has distanced herself from the progressive label. In 2023, In These Times described her as "currently mourning the leftism she now believes 'gaslit' her about a 'crime wave' it refuses to admit." She told a podcast about "disaffected Democrats" that "I'm going through something very real and very sincere and it's uncomfortable." In 2024, she declared herself "unaligned" and "politically homeless", saying she "woke up" when mentioning her shift toward more conservative views on crime and homelessness. Since 2023, she has been critical of gender-affirming care for trans people, particularly minors, arguing that it causes "irreparable harm". She is critical of identity politics, stating that "the biggest 'change' that some of you might have noticed with me is that I'm done with the identitarian garbage. I'm done with it. It is a giant distraction." Kasparian has been critical of cancel culture, and during an appearance on The Nightly Show with Larry Wilmore in November 2015 criticized what she viewed as support of cancel culture in progressive spaces, saying "people do stupid and offensive things all the time, and we can't expect to be shielded from it."

Kasparian is critical of California governor Gavin Newsom and the Democrats in the California State Legislature for what she considers "soft-on-crime" politics. In late November 2024, Kasparian referred to Newsom as the worst governor in the country "by a lot." She also criticized leftists, progressive policies on climate change and homelessness, and the Democratic Party. In an early December interview with conservative commentator Glenn Beck on The Blaze network, Kasparian criticized Democrats for allegedly downplaying immigration issues and said that Republican Texas governor Greg Abbott brought the matter to the forefront of public consciousness by busing migrants to sanctuary cities. She also referred to Democratic legislators in California as "grifters" due to perceived hypocrisy in their stance on immigration. Although she supports the deportation of violent undocumented criminals, she has condemned what she believes to be the weaponization of ICE to deport law-abiding immigrants and political opponents of the American right since the beginning of Trump's second term.

Kasparian is a vocal critic of Israel. Kasparian was accused of antisemitism in 2025 when she did an impersonation of Oracle founder Larry Ellison. In early 2026, she described Jeffrey Epstein's network as a "pedophile ring/Israeli blackmail operation" and asked an Israeli interlocutor "Why are you monsters always slaughtering innocent children and shaking us down for money?" In February 2026, Kasparian praised Tucker Carlson (whom she had interviewed in 2025) on Twitter for opposing a potential American war with Iran. In that same interview with Carlson, Kasparian spoke of Israel arming Azerbaijan with weapons in the 2020 Nagorno-Karabakh war, leading to the ethnic cleansing of over 120,000 Armenians from the region. In response to a critic calling her defense of Carlson antisemitic, Kasparian replied, "Hey, bitch, the goyim are waking the fuck up. Deal with it." The term "goyim", a word for non-Jews in Hebrew, had by the 2020s been adapted by far-right commentators to promote antisemitic conspiracy theories. Several critics alleged Kasparian's comment was antisemitic. Kasparian denied her comment was antisemitic, writing, "I do not regret this comment." Kasparian further said that "Israel is evil, genocidal and has destroyed our country." She is also quoted as saying: Israel is "about to drag us into another war, and all we hear from Israelis and their braindead supporters is 'ANTISEMITE' if you disagree with Israel's agenda".

== Personal life ==
In November 2015, Kasparian married Minor League Baseball player, model, and actor Christian Lopez. She wrote in 2016 that she does not plan to have children.

Kasparian was raised in the Armenian Apostolic Church, although for most of her career declared herself an atheist. In 2025, she said that while she is not a "full-blown Christian", she no longer considered herself atheist.

== See also ==
- History of Armenian Americans in Los Angeles
- List of Armenian Americans
- Women in journalism
- Independent media
