= The War Room with Michael Shure =

- Title card with Granholm as host
- Also known as: The War Room
- Presented by: Jennifer Granholm (January 2012 – February 2013); Michael Shure (February – August 2013)
- Country of origin: United States

Production
- Executive producer: Mark Berniker
- Production location: San Francisco
- Running time: 60 minutes

Original release
- Network: Current TV
- Release: January 30, 2012 – August 15, 2013

The War Room was a news and political commentary program on Current TV. It was initially hosted by former Governor of Michigan Jennifer Granholm. The show debuted on January 30, 2012, and aired on weeknights followed by The Young Turks with Cenk Uygur and Viewpoint with Eliot Spitzer.

"The War Room" is an allusion to the place where strategists plan a political campaign. Granholm had said that the program's stance would be progressive. Upon the departure of Granholm, The Young Turks contributor Michael Shure took up her role as the host. The show aired its final episode on August 15, 2013.

Over its history the show was known as The War Room with Jennifer Granholm and The War Room with Michael Shure.

== History ==
Current TV President David Bohrman said he, CEO Joel Hyatt and founder Al Gore first met Granholm in 2011 and were "immediately struck" by her television presence. The show was announced on October 12, 2011, and was intended to beef up Current's coverage of the 2012 presidential election.

After signing with Current, Granholm also appeared as a contributor on the network's Politically Direct 2012 coverage of Republican presidential debates and primaries.

The War Room's debut airing on January 30, 2012, offered a glimpse into Barack Obama's reelection campaign headquarters in Chicago.

On January 3, 2013, Granholm announced on Twitter that she was leaving the network due to the sale of the network to Al Jazeera Media Network. Her final show on Current TV was on February 7, 2013. She was replaced by The Young Turks regular Michael "Epic Politics Man" Shure until the transition to Al Jazeera America was complete. The final show was on August 15, 2013, with the end of all live programming on Current after which host Michael Shure became Al Jazeera America's main political contributor.

The former studio for The War Room is now being used as the main studio by the Al Jazeera's all digital channel AJ+.

== Format ==
The War Room focused on political news, commentary and opinion from newsmakers. The show's title is a reference to the place where strategists plot political campaigns. The show's set, which included an 82-inch touchscreen, is designed to resemble a so-called "war room". Granholm also covered "progressive heroes" who made a "positive difference" on the economy.

Granholm professed to be progressive, "on the left end of the spectrum." According to her, "Democrats will love it. The far right will hate it. Those in the middle will appreciate it." She said as governor, she "had to be a pragmatic," and that the show "will be taking a deeper dive to solutions to the most pressing problems out there."

=== Segments ===
Regular segments included:

- "What's Working": examining government policies
- "The Big Money of Politics": the influence of money in politics
- "State of our States": news from various states
- "Shush, Brett’s Talking": featuring satirist Brett Erlich.
- "My View": Granholm's personal commentary on the issues of the day.
