= John Fugelsang =

American actor, host and political commentator (born 1969)

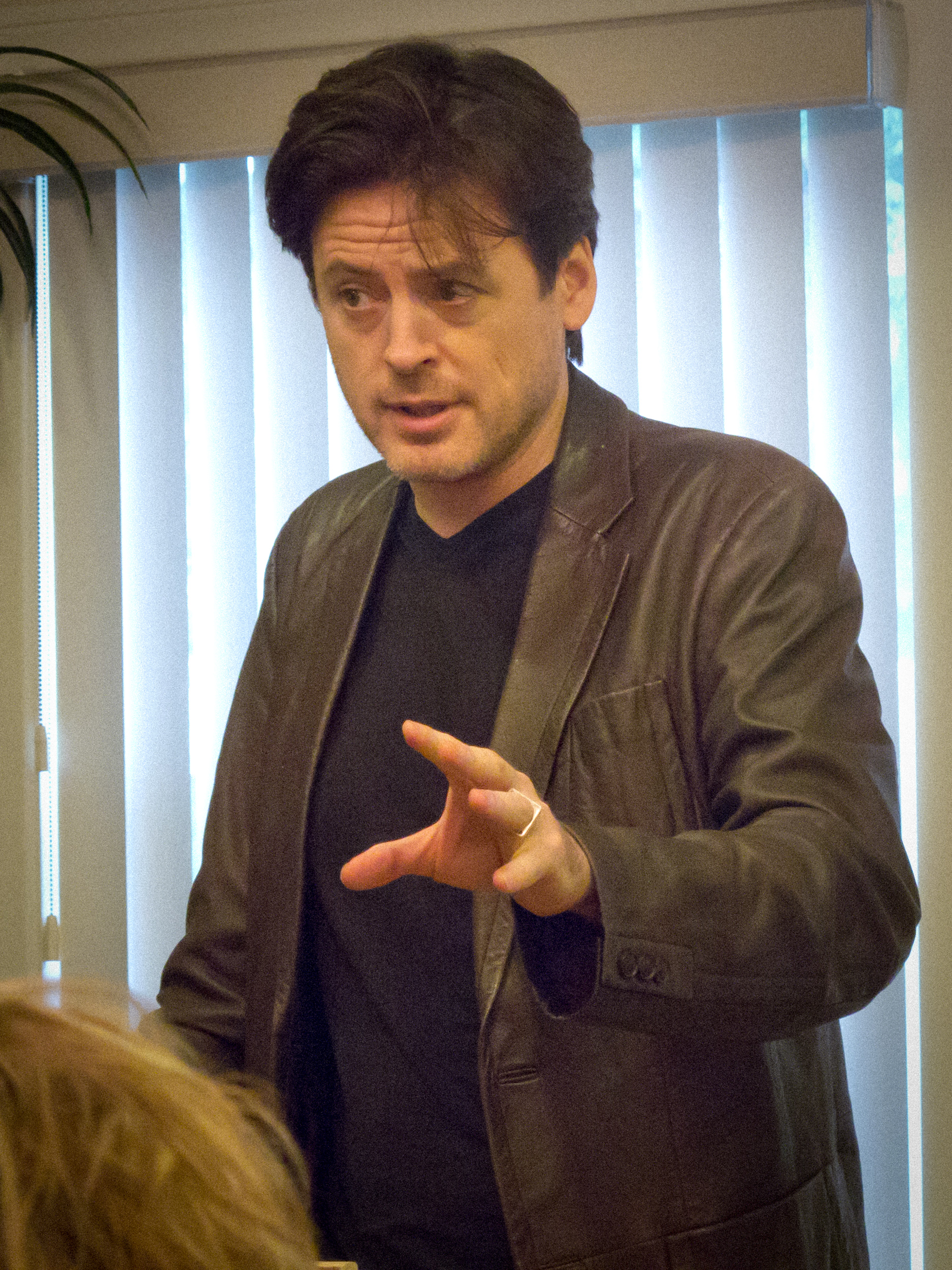
- Fugelsang in 2011
- Born: John Joseph Fugelsang; September 3, 1969 (age 57); Long Island, New York, U.S.
- Occupations: Actor; comedian; writer; television host; political commentator; television personality
- Years active: 1996–present
- Spouse: Charmien LaFramenta (m. 2004)
- Children: 1

John Joseph Fugelsang (born September 3, 1969) is an American actor, comedian, writer, television host, political commentator, and television personality.

As an actor, Fugelsang has appeared on film, television, and stage, including CSI, Providence, Coyote Ugly, Becker, The Michael Richards Show, and Savage in Limbo. Fugelsang also appeared in the 2015 documentary film Dream On. As a comedian, he has performed at the U.S. Comedy Arts Festival in Aspen, the Just for Laughs Festival in Montreal, and on the talk show Politically Incorrect. In 2007, he premiered the solo show All The Wrong Reasons Off Broadway at New York Theatre Workshop.

Fugelsang has hosted and co-hosted numerous shows, including VH1 Archives, America's Funniest Home Videos, John McEnroe's short-lived CNBC talk show in 2004, CNBC's Bullseye, Red Eye on Fox News, World Series of Blackjack on GSN, and the political talk show Viewpoint. Fugelsang is also a contributor to the HuffPost weblog, a regular commentator and guest on The Stephanie Miller Show, and has been featured on CNN, Fox News, Dennis Miller, The Young Turks, Air America, CNBC, and MSNBC. Since 2015, Fugelsang has been the host of Tell Me Everything, a "progressive talk" show on SiriusXM Insight.

Fugelsang's first book, Separation of Church and Hate - A Sane Person's Guide to Taking Back the Bible from Fundamentalists, Fascists, and Flock-Fleecing Frauds, was published in August 2025. This book won the American Book Award 2026, the audio book won an Audie award, and was a New York Times bestseller.

== Early life and education ==
Fugelsang was born on Long Island, New York. Of Danish, German, and Irish descent, he is the son of a former Carmelite nun and a former Franciscan friar.

At New York University, Fugelsang a graduate of the Tisch School of the Arts with a degree in Film and Television. Fugelsang also studied theatre at the Boston University Theatre Institute and the Circle in the Square Theatre.

== Career ==
=== Stage and screen ===
Fugelsang has appeared in diverse projects as an actor, ranging from CSI and Providence to Coyote Ugly. As a comedian, he has performed at the U.S. Comedy Arts Festival in Aspen and the Just for Laughs Festival in Montréal and he has made more than 20 appearances on Politically Incorrect.

In 2007, he premiered the solo show All The Wrong Reasons Off Broadway at New York Theatre Workshop. The show received a Drama League nomination for Distinguished Performance. New York Magazine said "Fugelsang has the soul of an iconoclast" and The New York Daily News said the piece "packed an unexpectedly lovely and life affirming wallop".

Subsequent runs included Los Angeles, Seattle, New York City's Barrow Street Theatre, Albuquerque, and closing the South Beach Comedy Festival in Miami.

Additional film, television, and stage credits include Becker, Somewhere in the City, The Michael Richards Show, Beyond Belief, Chicken Soup for the Soul, Hamlet, Blue Window, and Savage in Limbo.

Fugelsang appeared in the 2015 documentary film Dream On.

=== Host and presenter ===
Fugelsang has hosted VH1 Archives, George Harrison: The Last Performance, and Paul McCartney's Live Town Hall on VH1. He was also on America's Funniest Home Videos (co-hosting with Daisy Fuentes) for two seasons (1998–99), co-hosted John McEnroe's short-lived CNBC talk show in 2004, and was a regular on CNBC's Bullseye and Red Eye on Fox News. He was the co-host of the World Series of Blackjack on GSN alongside Ben Mezrich, the author of Bringing Down the House. He also co-hosted, along with Debra Wilson and Teresa Strasser, TV Watercooler on TV Guide Channel (2005–09). In 2012, John Fugelsang hosted a series of videos on the YouTube channel entitled "POLIPOP". From January 2013 until August 2013, Fugelsang was the host of the Current TV political talk show Viewpoint. The show ended with the end of all live programming on Current.

=== Political commentator ===
In addition to his appearances on the late-night political talk show Politically Incorrect (1993–2002), Fugelsang has been a contributor to HuffPost weblog.

Fugelsang is a regular commentator and guest on the nationally syndicated progressive radio program, The Stephanie Miller Show, and has served as guest host on occasion. His usual guest spot on the show is entitled "Fridays with Fugelsang". He also tours alongside Miller and comedian and musician Hal Sparks as part of the Sexy Liberal Comedy Show. For 2017, the tour was entitled "Sexy Liberal Resistance Tour" along with Frangela (Frances Callier and Angela Shelton). The first show for the new tour was at the Barrymore, April 22, 2017, Madison.

Fugelsang has been featured on CNN, Fox News, Dennis Miller, The Young Turks, Air America, CNBC, and MSNBC. He served as the host on the Current TV political talk show, So That Happened. Additionally, he has contributed to Current TV's coverage of the 2012 presidential campaign. In an appearance on CNN in 2012, a question of his prompted the Romney campaign's Etch-a-sketch gaffe. On January 6, 2013, he replaced Eliot Spitzer as host of Viewpoint on Current TV. Starting in 2015, Fugelsang hosted Tell Me Everything, a "progressive talk" show on SiriusXM Insight.. In 2026, he started hosting The John Fugelsang Show on SirusXM Progress.

== Personal life ==
Fugelsang lives with his wife, designer Charmien La Framenta, and their son, Henry Jack, in Hollywood and New York City's Greenwich Village.

== Filmography ==
Year	Title	Role	Notes
1996	Conception	Jack	Short film
1996	VH1 Archives	Himself/host	Television series documentary
1997	George Harrison & Ravi Shankar: Yin & Yang	Himself/host	Television special
1998	Somewhere in the City	Henry	
1998	Twice Upon a Time	Brett	Television film
1998	Decampitated	Phone Voice Specialist	
1998	The Daily Show	Himself	1 episode
1998–1999	America's Funniest Home Videos	Himself/host	21 episodes
1999	Final Rinse	Ozzie	
1999	Politically Incorrect	Himself	1 episode
1999	Beyond Belief: Fact or Fiction	Artie	Season 3 episode 12
1999–2002	Providence	Mr. Chris Calloway	3 episodes
2000	Coyote Ugly	Richie the Booker	
2000	The Michael Richards Show	Mauskopf	Episode: "Simplification"
2000	Becker	Greg Jackson	Episode: "Beckerethics"
2000	Flix	Himself/host	
2001	18 Wheels of Justice	N/A	Episode: "Come Back, Little Diva"
2001	CSI: Crime Scene Investigation	Vincent Thomas Avery	Episode: "Ellie"
2002	Late Friday	Himself	1 episode
2002	The Conspiracy Zone	Himself	Episode: "FEMA"
2003	House of Clues	N/A	Episode: "Pilot"
2004	McEnroe	Himself/co-host	22 episodes
2005	The Basement	The Man	
2009	The Whole Truth	Prosecutor Smith	
2010	Curb: The Discussion	Himself	4 episodes
2011	The Moms View	Feature Guest	Unknown episodes
2012	Price Check	Jake	
2012	John Fugelsang: So That Happened	Host	
2012	Caffeinated with John Fugelsang	Himself	20 episodes
2014	The Girl on the Train	Lottery Guy	
2017	Maggie Black	Paul	
2017	Tutor Pimp	Jacob	Television film
2017–2018	Page Six TV	Himself/Host	
2019	Jonathan Pie's American Pie	Self	Television film
2021	Radio Gods	Choade	1 episode

Media offices
Preceded by Bob Saget	Co-Host of America's Funniest Home Videos with Daisy Fuentes; 1998–1999	Succeeded by Tom Bergeron
