= Michael Shure =

American political correspondent

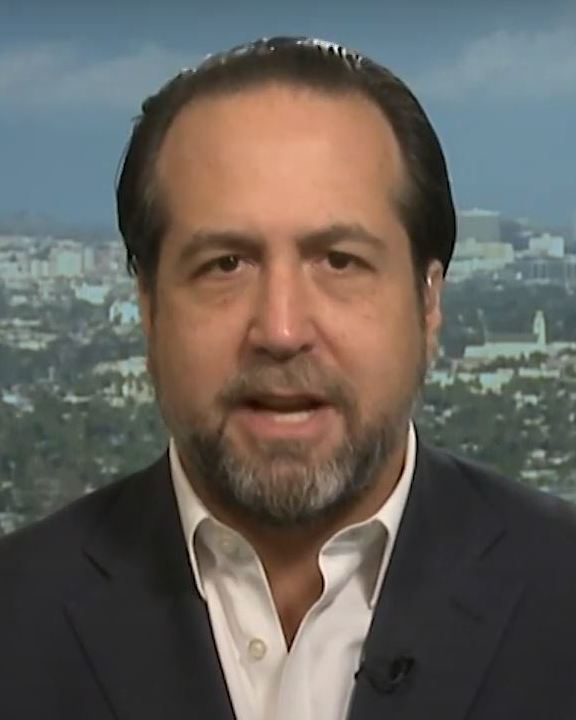
- Voices of the American South 2020
- Born: April 18, 1966 (age 60); New York City, U.S.
- Education: University of Virginia
- Occupations: Journalist, Political Correspondent, Anchor
- Notable credit(s): NewsNation i24 News; Cheddar News; The Young Turks; Al Jazeera America; The War Room with Michael Shure; CNN NewsStand
- Relatives: Robert Evans (Uncle)

Michael Shure (born April 18, 1966) is an American journalist. He is former national correspondent for Nexstar Media Group's national newscast on NewsNation. He was previously the Senior National Correspondent and Anchor for i24NEWS, Cheddar News, and an original member of, and regular host on The Young Turks. He was the host of that network's online 2012 election show, twenTYTwelve. Shure was previously the host of Current TV's The War Room with Michael Shure, a one-hour political commentary program that aired live Monday through Thursday; and later was the Chief Political Correspondent for Al Jazeera America until the network's closure. Shure has also occasionally appeared as an actor.

== Biography ==
Shure was born in New York City. He graduated from Trinity School (New York City) and the University of Virginia.

He was Florida press secretary for the Dukakis/Bentsen Presidential campaign during the 1988 presidential election.

Shure is an alumnus of the NBC Page program.

He was a correspondent for the short-lived show CNN NewsStand reporting for the show Entertainment Weekly

In 2002, Shure began contributing as a host and correspondent on The Young Turks, a multi-platform political talk show. He followed the show to Current TV in 2011 where he became a national political correspondent and host for the network. In February 2013 he took over as host for former Michigan governor Jennifer Granholm and the show, previously called The War Room With Jennifer Granholm became The War Room with Michael Shure until August 2013 when the show was ended with the rest of Current's live programming in preparation of the network's transition to Al Jazeera America.

After the acquisition of Current, he was retained by Al Jazeera America as Chief Political Correspondent

In 2017, Shure became the Senior National Correspondent and Anchor for i24NEWS, the US arm of the international Israel-headquartered news network. He also reported for partner network Cheddar News

Shure began working for NewsNation in 2020 as a National Correspondent

On March 11, 2022, Shure announced his candidacy for the CA-37 Congressional seat. He did not qualify for the general election with a loss in the June 7, 2022 primary

Shure has appeared as an actor in the films The Thing Called Love, House Party 3, and Showgirls. He also appeared in an episode of the HBO show Curb Your Enthusiasm.

== Personal ==
Shure's uncle was film producer Robert Evans. His brother, Tony Shure, co-founded Chopt Salad Company. He currently resides in Los Angeles, California.
