= Rotten Tomatoes =

American review aggregator for film and television

- Screenshot Rotten Tomatoes's homepage as of April 1, 2021
- Website type: Film and television review aggregator and user community
- Country of origin: United States
- Owners: Versant (75%); Skydance (25%)
- Founder: Senh Duong
- Key people: Senh Duong; Patrick Y. Lee; Stephen Wang
- Parent: Fandango Media
- Website: rottentomatoes.com
- Commercial: Yes
- Registration: Optional
- Launched: August 12, 1998; 28 years ago
- OCLC number: 48768329

Rotten Tomatoes is an American review-aggregation website for film and television. The company was launched in August 1998 by three undergraduate students at the University of California, Berkeley: Senh Duong, Patrick Y. Lee, and Stephen Wang. Although the name "Rotten Tomatoes" connects to the practice of audiences throwing rotten tomatoes in disapproval of a poor stage performance, the direct inspiration for the name from Duong, Lee, and Wang came from an equivalent scene in the 1992 Canadian film Léolo.

Since January 2010, Rotten Tomatoes has been owned by Flixster, which was in turn acquired by Warner Bros. in 2011. In February 2016, Rotten Tomatoes and its parent site Flixster were sold to Versant's (then NBCUniversal's) Fandango ticketing company. Skydance (and Warner Bros. Discovery before) retained a minority stake in the merged entities, including Fandango.

According to a 2018 survey, almost a third of United States adult moviegoers said they had consulted the site before going to the cinema. It has been criticized for oversimplifying reviews by flattening them into a fresh versus rotten dichotomy. It has also been criticized for being easy for studios to manipulate by limiting early screenings to critics inclined to be favorable, among other tactics.

== History ==
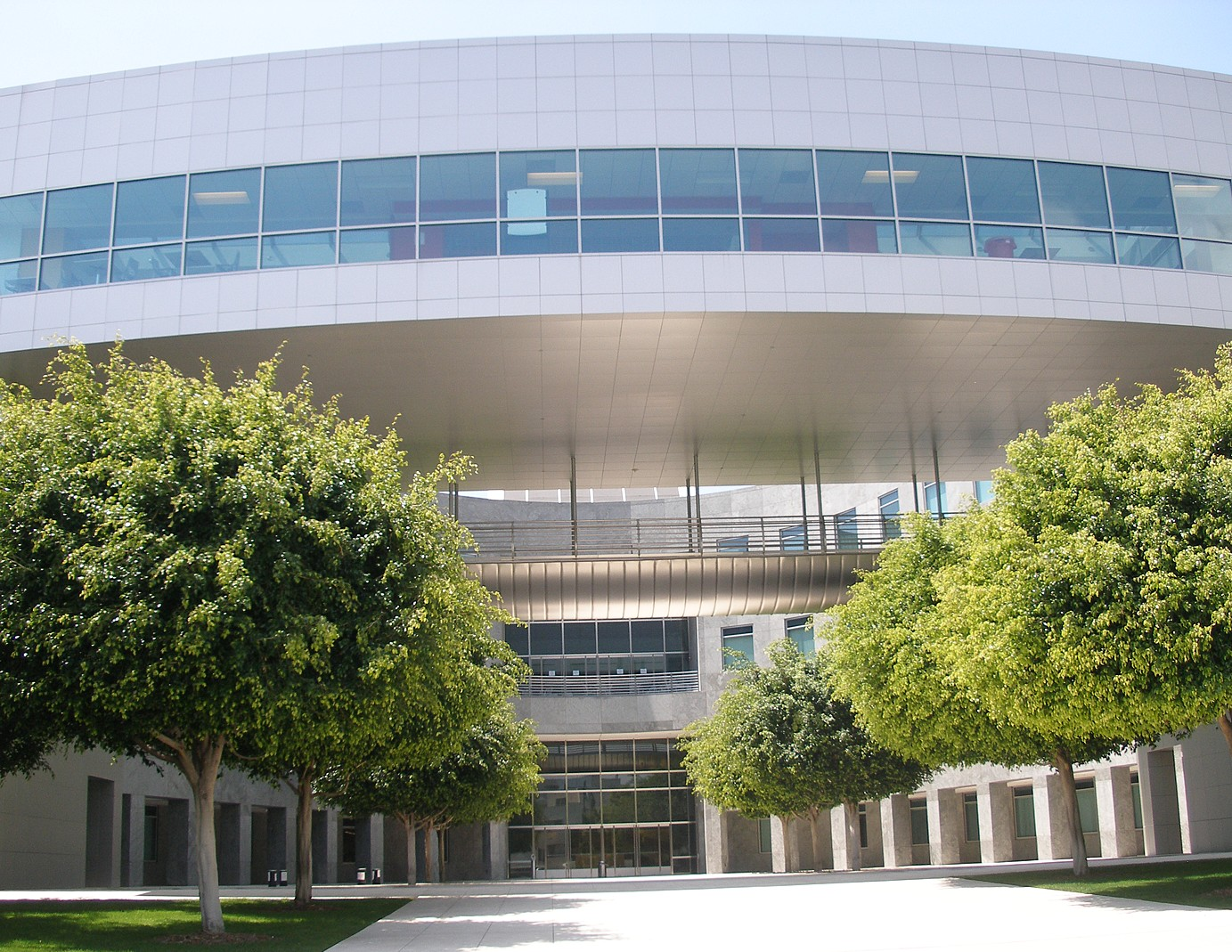
Old Fandango headquarters in Beverly Hills (home to Rotten Tomatoes)

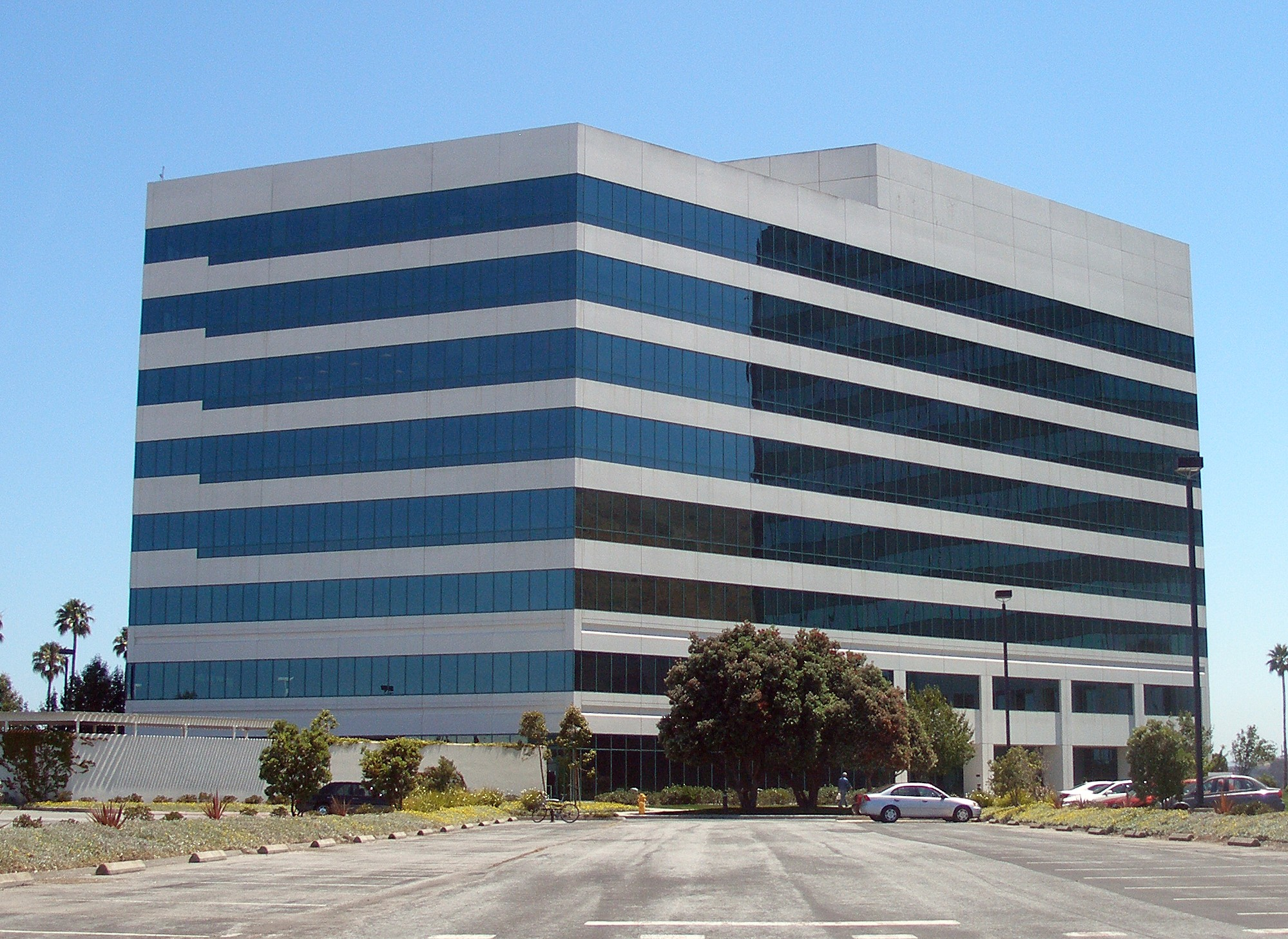
Former IGN headquarters in Brisbane, California (home to Rotten Tomatoes during 2004–2010 IGN ownership)

Rotten Tomatoes was launched on August 12, 1998, as a spare-time project by Senh Duong. His objective in creating Rotten Tomatoes was "to create a site where people can get access to reviews from a variety of critics in the U.S". As a fan of Jackie Chan, Duong was inspired to create the website after collecting all the reviews of Chan's Hong Kong action movies as they were being released in the United States. The catalyst for the creation of the website was Rush Hour (1998), Chan's first major Hollywood crossover, which was originally planned to release in August 1998. Duong coded the website in two weeks and the site went live the same month, but the release of Rush Hour was delayed until September 1998. Besides Jackie Chan films, he began including other films on Rotten Tomatoes, extending it beyond Chan's fandom. The first non-Chan Hollywood movie whose reviews were featured on Rotten Tomatoes was Your Friends & Neighbors (1998). The website was an immediate success, receiving mentions by Netscape, Yahoo!, and USA Today within the first week of its launch; it attracted "600–1,000 daily unique visitors" as a result.

Duong teamed up with University of California, Berkeley classmates Patrick Y. Lee and Stephen Wang, his former partners at the Berkeley, California-based web design firm Design Reactor, to pursue Rotten Tomatoes on a full-time basis. They officially launched it on April 1, 2000.

In June 2004, IGN Entertainment acquired Rotten Tomatoes for an undisclosed sum. In September 2005, IGN was bought by News Corp's Fox Interactive Media. In January 2010, IGN sold the website to Flixster. The combined reach of both companies, according to them, is 30 million unique visitors a month across all different platforms. In 2011, Warner Bros. acquired Rotten Tomatoes.

In early 2009, Current Television launched The Rotten Tomatoes Show, a televised version of the web review site. It was hosted by Brett Erlich and Ellen Fox and written by Mark Ganek. The show aired Thursdays at 10:30 EST until September 16, 2010. It returned as a much shorter segment of InfoMania, a satirical news show that ended in 2011.

By late 2009, the website was designed to enable Rotten Tomatoes users to create and join groups to discuss various aspects of film. One group, "The Golden Oyster Awards", accepted votes of members for various awards, spoofing the better-known Academy Awards or Golden Globes. When Flixster bought the company, they disbanded the groups.

As of February 2011, new community features have been added and others removed; for example, users can no longer sort films by Fresh Ratings from Rotten Ratings, and vice versa.

On September 17, 2013, a section devoted to scripted television series, called TV Zone, was created as a subsection of the website.

In February 2016, Rotten Tomatoes and its parent site Flixster were sold to Comcast's Fandango Media. Warner Bros retained a minority stake in the merged entities, including Fandango.

In December 2016, Fandango and all its various websites moved to Fox Interactive Media's former headquarters in Beverly Hills, California.

In July 2017, the website's editor-in-chief since 2007, Matt Atchity, left to join The Young Turks YouTube channel. On November 1, 2017, the site launched a new web series on Facebook, See It/Skip It, hosted by Jacqueline Coley and Segun Oduolowu.

In March 2018, the site announced its new design, icons and logo for the first time in 19 years at South by Southwest.

On May 19, 2020, Rotten Tomatoes won the 2020 Webby People's Voice Award for Entertainment in the Web category.

In February 2021, the Rotten Tomatoes staff made an entry on their Product Blog, announcing several design changes to the site: Each film's 'Score Box' at the top of the page would now also include its release year, genre, and runtimes, with an MPAA rating to be soon added; the number of ratings would be shown in groupings – from 50+ up to 250,000+ ratings, for easier visualization. Links to critics and viewers are included underneath the ratings. By clicking on either the Tomatometer Score or the Audience Score, the users can access "Score Details" information, such as the number of Fresh and Rotten reviews, average rating, and Top Critics' score. The team also added a new "What to Know" section for each film entry page, which could combine the "Critics Consensus" blurb with a new "Audience Says" blurb, so users can see an at-a-glance summary of the sentiments of both certified critics and verified audience members.

== Features ==
=== Critics' aggregate score ===
Rotten Tomatoes staff collect reviews from writers who are certified members of various writing guilds or film critic-associations. To be accepted as a critic on the website, a critic's original reviews must garner a specific number of "likes" from users. Those classified as "Top Critics" generally write for major newspapers. The critics upload their reviews to the movie page on the website and mark them as "fresh" if it is generally favorable or as "rotten" otherwise. It is necessary for the critic to do so as some reviews are qualitative and do not grant a numeric score, making it impossible for the system to be automatic.

The website keeps track of all the reviews counted for each film and calculates the percentage of positive reviews (called the "Tomatometer"). If the positive reviews make up 60% or more, the film is considered "fresh". If the positive reviews are less than 60%, the film is considered "rotten". Previously, an average score on a 0 to 10 scale was also calculated. This feature was introduced in 2003 and was removed in April 2025. With each review, a short excerpt of the review is quoted that also serves a hyperlink to the complete review essay for anyone interested to read the critic's full thoughts.

"Top Critics", such as Roger Ebert, Desson Thomson, Stephen Hunter, Owen Gleiberman, Lisa Schwarzbaum, Peter Travers, and Michael Phillips, are identified in a sub-listing that calculates their reviews separately. Their opinions are also included in the general rating. When there are sufficient reviews, the staff creates and posts a consensus statement to express the general reasons for the collective opinion of the film. The "Certified Fresh" seal is reserved for movies that satisfy two criteria: a Tomatometer of 75% or better and at least 80 reviews (40 for limited release movies) from Tomatometer critics (including at least 5 Top Critics). Films earning this status will keep it unless the positive critical percentage drops below 70%. Films which reach the "Certified Fresh" requirements are only granted the seal if the Tomatometer is be consistent and unlikely to deviate significantly.

For a Tomatometer score to be displayed, a film must meet a minimum number of critic reviews. The threshold changes depending on the film's projected box office in the United States, with the financial forecast provided by an "independent outside source". For films projected to make more than $120 million, they must receive 40 critic reviews before they receive a Tomatometer score; for projections of $60 million or more, 20 reviews are required; and for projections of under $60 million, or for films lacking a projection, 10 reviews are required.

Tomatometer scores
Icon	Seal	Score	Description
	Certified Fresh	100–75%	For this distinction to be ascribed, the bare minimum requirements are: Wide-release films with a score of 75% or higher that are reviewed by at least 80 critics, of whom 5 are "Top Critics"; films with limited releases require only 40 reviews (including 5 from "Top Critics"); for TV shows, only individual seasons are eligible for consideration, and each must have at least 20 critic reviews.
	Fresh	100–60%	Films or TV shows with a score of 60% or higher that do not meet the requirements for the "Certified Fresh" seal.
	Rotten	59–0%	Films or TV shows with a score of 59% or lower receive this seal.

==== Golden Tomato Awards ====
In 2000, Rotten Tomatoes announced the RT Awards honoring the best-reviewed films of the year according to the website's rating system. The awards were later renamed the Golden Tomato Awards. The nominees and winners are announced on the website, although there is no actual awards ceremony.

The films are divided into wide release and limited release categories. Limited releases are defined as opening in 599 or fewer theaters at initial release. Platform releases, movies initially released under 600 theaters but later receiving wider distribution, fall under this definition. Any film opening in more than 600 theaters is considered wide release. There are also two categories purely for British and Australian films. The "User"-category represents the highest rated film among users, and the "Mouldy"-award represents the worst-reviewed films of the year. A movie must have 40 (originally 20) or more rated reviews to be considered for domestic categories. It must have 500 or more user ratings to be considered for the "User"-category.

Films are further classified based on film genre. Each movie is eligible in only one genre, aside from non-English-language films, which can be included in both their genre and the respective "Foreign" category.

Once a film is considered eligible, its "votes" are counted. Each critic from the website's list gets one vote (as determined by their review), all weighted equally. Because reviews are continually added, manually and otherwise, a cutoff date at which new reviews are not counted toward the Golden Tomato awards is initiated each year, usually the first of the new year. Reviews without ratings are not counted toward the results of the Awards.

=== Audience score and reviews ===
Each movie features a "user average", called the "Popcornmeter", which calculates the percentage of registered users who have rated the film positively on a 5-star scale, similar to calculation of recognized critics' reviews.

For a Popcornmeter score to be displayed, a film must meet a minimum number of audience reviews. The threshold changes depending on the film's projected box office in the United States. For films projected to make more than $120 million, they must receive 500 audience reviews before they receive a Popcornmeter score; for projections of $60 million or more, 300 reviews are required; for projections of $5 million or more, 100 reviews are required; and for projections of less than $5 million, or films lacking a projection, 50 reviews are required.

On May 24, 2019, Rotten Tomatoes introduced a verified rating system that would replace the earlier system where users were merely required to register to submit a rating. Users also have to verify their ticket purchase through ticketing company Fandango Media, the parent company of Rotten Tomatoes. While users can still leave reviews without verifying, those reviews are not counted.

On August 21, 2024, Rotten Tomatoes rebranded its audience score as the Popcornmeter and introduced a new "Verified Hot" badge. The designation is only given to films which have reached an audience score of 90 percent or higher. A representative for Rotten Tomatoes stated that their goal is to include other services in the future for users who do not use Fandango. Upon its creation, the "Verified Hot" badge was installed retroactively on over 200 films which achieved a verified audience score of 90% or higher since the launch of Rotten Tomatoes' verified audience ratings in May 2019.

Popcornmeter scores
Icon		Score	Description
	Verified Hot	100–90%	
	Hot	100–60%	Films or TV shows with a score of 60% or higher that do not meet the requirements for the "Verified Hot" seal.
	Stale	59–0%	Films or TV shows with a score of 59% or lower receive this seal.

=== "Critics Consensus" / "Audience Says" ===
Each movie features a brief blurb summary of the critics' reviews, called the "Critics Consensus", used in that entry's Tomatometer aggregate score.

In February 2021, Rotten Tomatoes added an "Audience Says" section; similar to the "Critics Consensus", it summarizes the reviews noted by registered users into a concise blurb. The Rotten Tomatoes staff noted that for any given film, if there were any external factors such as controversies or issues affecting the sentiments of a film, they may address it in the "Audience Says" section to give users the most relevant info regarding their viewing choices.

Example of a "What to Know" section for a Rotten Tomatoes entry page, for the 2017 film Jumanji: Welcome to the Jungle

In February 2021, a new "What to Know" section was created for each film entry, combining the "Critics consensus" and a new "Audience Says" blurbs within it, for an at-a-glance summary of the general sentiments of a film as experienced by critics and audiences. Prior to February 2021, only the "Critics consensus" blurb was posted for each entry, after enough certified critics had submitted reviews. When the "Audience Says" blurbs were added, Rotten Tomatoes initially included them only for newer films and those with a significant audience rating, but suggested that they may later add them for older films as well.

=== Localized versions ===
Localized versions of the site available in the United Kingdom, India, and Australia were discontinued following the acquisition of Rotten Tomatoes by Fandango. The Mexican version of the site, Tomatazos, remains active.

=== API ===
The Rotten Tomatoes API provides limited access to critic and audience ratings and reviews, allowing developers to incorporate Rotten Tomatoes data on other websites. The free service is intended for use in the US only; permission is required for use elsewhere. As of 2022, API access is restricted to approved developers that must go through an application process.

== Influence ==
Major Hollywood studios have come to see Rotten Tomatoes as a potential threat to their marketing. In 2017, several blockbuster films like Pirates of the Caribbean: Dead Men Tell No Tales, Baywatch and The Mummy were projected to open with gross receipts of $90 million, $50 million and $45 million, respectively, but ended up debuting with $62.6 million, $23.1 million and $31.6 million. Rotten Tomatoes, which scored the films at 30%, 19% and 16%, respectively, was blamed for undermining them. That same summer, films like Wonder Woman and Spider-Man: Homecoming (both 92%) received high scores and opened at or exceeded expectations with their $100+ million trackings.

As a result of this concern, 20th Century Fox commissioned a 2015 study, titled "Rotten Tomatoes and Box Office", that stated the website combined with social media was going to be an increasingly serious complication for the film business: "The power of Rotten Tomatoes and fast-breaking word of mouth will only get stronger. Many Millennials and even Gen X-ers now vet every purchase through the Internet, whether it's restaurants, video games, make-up, consumer electronics or movies. As they get older and comprise an even larger share of total moviegoers, this behavior is unlikely to change". Other studios have commissioned a number of studies on the subject, with them finding that 7/10 people said they would be less interested in seeing a film if the Rotten Tomatoes score was below 25%, and that the site has the most influence on people 25 and younger.

The scores have reached a level of online ubiquity which film companies have found threatening. The scores are prominently featured in Google search results, in Fandango's popular ticket purchasing service, on popular streaming services like Peacock, and on Flixster, which led to complaints that "rotten" scores damaged films' performances.

Others have argued that filmmakers and studios have only themselves to blame if Rotten Tomatoes produces a bad score, as this only reflects a poor reception among film critics. As one independent film distributor marketing executive noted, "To me, it's a ridiculous argument that Rotten Tomatoes is the problem ... make a good movie!". ComScore's Paul Dergarabedian had similar comments, saying: "The best way for studios to combat the 'Rotten Tomatoes Effect' is to make better movies, plain and simple."

Some studios have suggested embargoing or cancelling early critic screenings in a response to poor reviews prior to a film's release affecting pre-sales and opening weekend numbers. In July 2017, Sony embargoed critic reviews for The Emoji Movie until mid-day the Thursday before its release. The film ended up with a 9% rating (including 0% after the first 25 reviews), but still opened to $24 million, on par with projections. Josh Greenstein, Sony Pictures President of Worldwide Marketing and Distribution, said, "The Emoji Movie was built for people under 18 ... so we wanted to give the movie its best chance. What other wide release with a score under 8 percent has opened north of $20 million? I don't think there is one." Conversely, Warner Bros. also did not do critic pre-screenings for The House, which held a score of 16% until the day of its release, and opened to just $8.7 million; the lowest of star Will Ferrell's career.

Such marketing tactic can backfire, and drew the vocal disgust of influential critics such as Roger Ebert, who was prone to derisively condemn such moves, with gestures such as "The Wagging Finger of Shame", on At the Movies. Furthermore, the very nature of withholding reviews can draw early conclusions from the public that the film is of poor quality.

On February 26, 2019, in response to issues surrounding coordinated "bombing" of user reviews for several films, most notably Captain Marvel and Star Wars: The Rise of Skywalker, prior to their release, the site announced that user reviews would no longer be accepted until a film is publicly released. The site also announced plans to introduce a system for "verified" reviews, and that the "Want to See" statistic would now be expressed as a number so that it would not be confused with the audience score.

Despite arguments on how Rotten Tomatoes scores impact the box office, academic researchers so far have not found evidence that Rotten Tomatoes ratings affect box office performance.

In April 2024, The Hollywood Reporter reported that directors' past Rotten Tomatoes scores are brought up by producers in pitch meetings. One director representative said, "Critical acclaim is now gamified. The Rotten Tomatoes score is the first thing people look at when I go pitch a director. It inevitably affects decision-making around hiring a director."

== Criticism ==
=== Oversimplification ===
In January 2010, on the occasion of the 75th anniversary of the New York Film Critics Circle, its chairman Armond White cited Rotten Tomatoes in particular and film review aggregators in general as examples of how "the Internet takes revenge on individual expression". He said they work by "dumping reviewers onto one website and assigning spurious percentage-enthusiasm points to the discrete reviews". According to White, such websites "offer consensus as a substitute for assessment". Landon Palmer, a film and media historian and an assistant professor in the Department of Journalism and Creative Media director in the College of Communication and Information Sciences at the University of Alabama agreed with White, stating that Rotten Tomatoes applies a "problematic algorithm to pretty much all avenues of modern media art and entertainment".

Director and producer Brett Ratner has criticized the website for "reducing hundreds of reviews culled from print and online sources into a popularized aggregate score", while expressing respect for traditional film critics. Writer Max Landis, following his film Victor Frankenstein receiving an approval rating of 24% on the site, wrote that the site "breaks down entire reviews into just the word 'yes' or 'no', making criticism binary in a destructive arbitrary way".

=== Review manipulation ===
Vulture ran an article in September 2023 that raised several criticisms of Rotten Tomatoes's system, including the ease at which large companies are able to manipulate reviewer ratings. The article cited publicity company Bunker 15 as an example of how scores can be boosted by recruiting obscure, often self-published reviewers, using the example of 2018's Ophelia.

Rotten Tomatoes responded by delisting several Bunker 15 films, including Ophelia. It told Vulture in a statement, "We take the integrity of our scores seriously and do not tolerate any attempts to manipulate them. We have a dedicated team who monitors our platforms regularly and thoroughly investigates and resolves any suspicious activity."

WIRED published an article in February 2024 written by Christopher Null, a former film critic, that argued such methods are standard activities performed by all PR agencies. In particular, Null points out that sponsoring legitimate, honest reviews has a long history in other industries and is a "common tactic employed by indie titles to get visibility".

=== Other criticisms ===
American director Martin Scorsese wrote a column in The Hollywood Reporter criticizing both Rotten Tomatoes and CinemaScore for promoting the idea that films like Mother! had to be "instantly liked" to be successful. Scorsese, in a dedication for the Roger Ebert Center for Film Studies at the University of Illinois later continued his criticism, voicing that Rotten Tomatoes and other review services "devalue cinema on streaming platforms to the level of content".

In 2015, while promoting the film Suffragette (which has a 73% approval rating) actress Meryl Streep accused Rotten Tomatoes of disproportionately representing the opinions of male film critics, resulting in a skewed ratio that adversely affected the commercial performances of female-driven films. "I submit to you that men and women are not the same, they like different things", she said. "Sometimes they like the same thing, but sometimes their tastes diverge. If the Tomatometer is slighted so completely to one set of tastes that drives box office in the United States, absolutely." Critics took issue with the sentiment that someone's gender or ethnic background would dictate their response to art.

Rotten Tomatoes deliberately withheld the critic score for Justice League based on early reviews until the premiere of its See It/Skip It episode on the Thursday before its release. Some critics viewed the move as a ploy to promote the web series, but some argued that the move was a deliberate conflict of interest on account of Warner Bros.' ownership of the film and Rotten Tomatoes, and the tepid critical reception of the DC Extended Universe films at the time.

The New York Times aggregated statistics on the critical reception of audience scores versus critic scores, and noticed in almost every genre that "The public rates a movie more positively than do the critics. The only exceptions are black comedies and documentaries. Critics systematically rate films in these genres more highly than do Rotten Tomatoes users". Slate magazine collected data in a similar survey that revealed a noticeable favor for movies released before the 1990s, that "may be explained by a bias toward reviewers reviewing, or Rotten Tomatoes scoring, only the best movies from bygone eras".

== See also ==
- Metacritic
- Internet Movie Database (IMDb)
- List of films with a 0% rating on Rotten Tomatoes
- List of films with a 100% rating on Rotten Tomatoes
- "Splatty Tomato"
