= V-CAM =

Advertisement provided by a consumer that is solicited by a company

A V-CAM, or Viewer-Created Ad Message, is an advertisement provided by the consumer that is solicited by the company.

The V-CAM advertisement was one of the pieces the consumer could make and submit to Current TV. Current TV's sponsors, like Toyota, or Mountain Dew, had assignments so consumers could create a commercial for their given product. The creator had to adhere to the guidelines given. V-CAMS originated with Current TV.

== First V-CAM ad ==
The first V-CAM ad aired on Current TV on May 11, 2006, for Sony. The title of the ad was "Transformation" and was created by nineteen-year-old Tyson Ibele.

== Other definitions ==
A V-CAM is also a virtual camera for a program called Flash. It is moved around the stage during the editing process, and when the animation is exported anything underneath the V-Cam is shown rather than the whole stage as usual.
