= Jesse Watters controversies =

Controversies surrounding conservative commentator Jesse Watters

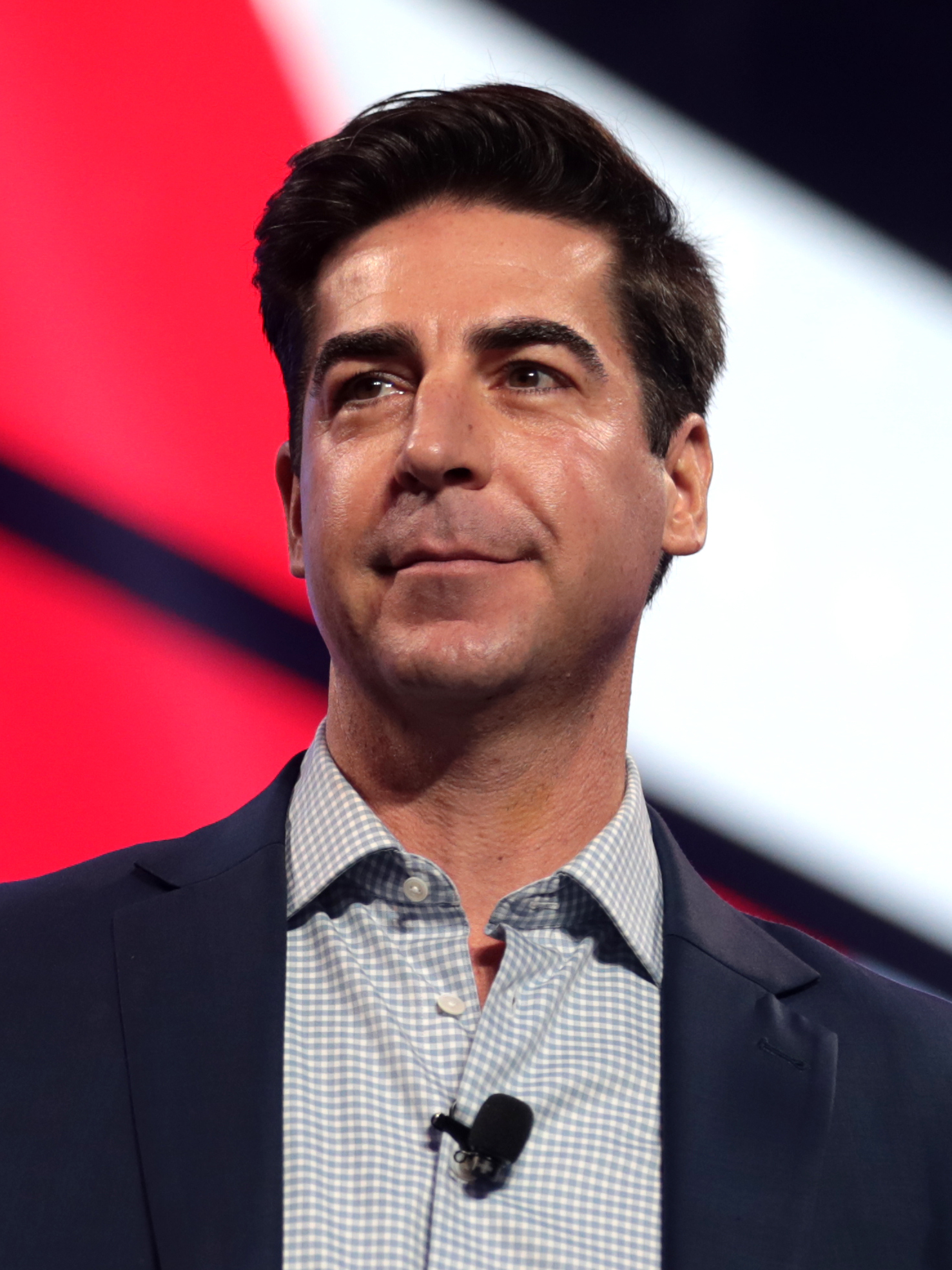
Watters in 2021

This is a list of notable controversies surrounding conservative commentator Jesse Watters.

== List of controversies ==
=== Amanda Terkel stalking ===
In 2009, while working on The O'Reilly Factor, Watters and his cameraman followed journalist Amanda Terkel in her car for two hours while she drove to Winchester, Virginia, for vacation, and then asked her several questions about an article she had written beforehand that was critical of Bill O'Reilly.

In May 2016, while at the White House Correspondents Dinner journalists' reception, The Huffington Post's Ryan Grim approached Watters while recording and asked him to apologize to Terkel. Watters at first said he would apologize, before then saying he wouldn't, adding, "I ambushed her because O'Reilly told me to get her because she said some bad shit." Video of the incident shows Watters then grabbing Grim's phone and throwing it on the floor, later grabbing it again and putting it in his pocket. The two reporters ended up in a shoving match as Grim attempted to recover his phone.

Watters would later comment on the incident while on The O'Reilly Factor, stating, "I was at this party trying to enjoy myself. This guy came up to me. He starts putting it in my face." Terkel later wrote that Watters's response was "surprising", considering that "Watters' way of confronting his subjects is to thrust cameras in their faces unexpectedly and pepper them with aggressive questions."

=== Chinatown segment ===
In October 2016, Watters was criticized for a segment of Watters' World that was widely considered racist toward Asian Americans. While in New York City's Chinatown, Watters asked Chinese Americans whether they knew karate (a Japanese martial art), whether he should bow before greeting them, or if their watches had been stolen. Throughout the segment, the 1974 song "Kung Fu Fighting" plays in the background, and the interviews are interspersed with references to martial arts and clips of Watters getting a foot massage and playing with nunchucks.

Bill De Blasio, the then-mayor of New York City, denounced Watters's segment as "vile, racist behavior" that "has no place in our city". Numerous other lawmakers and journalists, including US Senator Mazie Hirono and US Representative Judy Chu, also condemned Watters. The segment was also criticized by the Asian American Journalists Association, which issued a statement saying, "We should be far beyond tired, racist stereotypes and targeting an ethnic group for humiliation and objectification on the basis of their race."

On October 5, 2016, Watters tweeted what Variety's Will Thorne called a "non-apology" about the segment. In the two tweets, Watters stated that "My man-on-the-street interviews are meant to be taken as tongue-in-cheek and I regret if anyone found offense.... As a political humorist, the Chinatown segment was intended to be a light piece, as all Watters' World segments are."

=== John Podesta comments ===
In January 2017, Watters faulted John Podesta, Hillary Clinton's campaign manager, for the theft of Podesta's emails by Russian hackers, saying, "What happened was John Podesta gave his password to a hacker. And guess what his password was. 'Password.' It's a true story. His password was 'password.'" The fact-checking website PolitiFact rated Watters' claim as "False".

=== Ivanka Trump comments ===
In April 2017, two days after joining The Five as co-host, Watters made an on-air comment about Ivanka Trump (the daughter of President Donald Trump) that was criticized as lewd. After viewing video footage of Ms. Trump speaking on a panel about female entrepreneurship, Watters commented, "So I don't really get what's going on here, but I really liked how she was speaking into that microphone", as he parodied holding the microphone as a phallic symbol.

Watters denied his comment was sexual, saying in a statement: "During the break we were commenting on Ivanka's voice and how it was low and steady and resonates like a smooth jazz radio DJ ... This was in no way a joke about anything else." In response to the criticism, Watters was not on the show for two days that week.

=== QAnon comments ===
In July 2020, Jesse Watters' comments during his show, about the conspiracy theory movement QAnon, drew public criticism. Watters's statements about the group included, "they've also uncovered a lot of great stuff when it comes to Epstein and [when] it comes to the deep state. I never saw Q as dangerous as antifa." Following the outcry over his commentary, Watters released a statement that said: "I mentioned the conspiracy group QAnon, which I don't support or believe in. My comments should not be mistaken for giving credence to this fringe platform."

=== Dr. Anthony Fauci comments ===
Watters speaking at the 2021 Student Action Summit hosted by Turning Point USA

Watters attended the Turning Point USA's AmericaFest conference in December 2021, where he advocated for attendees to aggressively confront and question National Institute of Allergy and Infectious Diseases Director Anthony Fauci about his alleged funding of gain-of-function research at the Wuhan Institute of Virology, saying, "Now you go in for the kill shot. The kill shot? With an ambush? Deadly. Because he doesn't see it coming." Fauci responded by calling Watters' remarks "awful" and stating that Watters "should be fired on the spot". Fox News Channel indicated its continued support for Watters, saying he "was using a metaphor" and that his comments "had been twisted completely out of context".

=== Comments about the Muslim world and Arab-Americans ===
During the November 2, 2023, broadcast of The Five, Watters stated during a segment about the Gaza war protests that "We've had it with them", referring to the Muslim world. He added, "If you are an Arab American in this country and you ripped down posters of Jewish hostages, American hostages, no! No, no, no. Someone is gonna get punched in the face." This statement was condemned by White House spokesperson Andrew James Bates, who stated that "These unacceptable remarks come just weeks after the heartbreaking killing of a 6-year-old Palestinian-American child... Fox News owes an apology to every single viewer for this sickening attack on the rights and dignity of their fellow Americans."

=== Kamala Harris comments ===
During the August 27, 2024, broadcast of The Five, Watters commented on Vice President and 2024 Democratic Party presidential nominee Kamala Harris: "We don't know who she is. We don't know what she believes. She's going to get paralyzed in the Situation Room while the generals have their way with her." Watters received immediate criticism for this comment, including from his panel colleagues Jeanine Pirro and Dana Perino. A day later, Watters addressed the criticism on-air, stating his comments were misconstrued as being sexual. He further stated he was simply "expressing my opinion that VP Harris' current leadership style could be an issue if elected."

=== Comments on masculinity ===
Watters criticized former president Joe Biden for licking ice cream in public as "a grown man". He has instructed men on how they should wave and belittled those who grocery shop with their wives. In September 2024, Jesse Watters was criticized for comments he made on The Five regarding Tim Walz, the governor of Minnesota and a running mate of the US Presidential candidate Kamala Harris, who had shared a photo of himself drinking a milkshake with a paper straw. Watters mocked the image as an example of Walz's lack of masculinity because he used a straw, which he claimed made women dislike Walz, because women like masculinity. He said that asking for a "vanilla shake" instead of a "vanilla ice cream shake" also makes men look weak. The remarks sparked backlash, with critics accusing Watters of promoting outdated gender norms and using a triviality to push political commentary. Governor Walz responded by defending his posting of the photo and encouraging a focus on real issues rather than manufactured culture wars.

In March 2025, Watters listed his "five rules for men" on The Five – don't be that serious, just be funny; don't eat soup in public; don't cross your legs; don't drink from a straw; and don't wave simultaneously with two hands because men wave with one hand. He added that one of the reasons you don't drink from a straw is the way your lips purse, which is very effeminate. He said, referring to Minnesota Governor Tim Walz, that Walz's excuse was, "'Well, I was drinking a milkshake.' Again, you shouldn't be drinking a milkshake. Milkshakes are for kids." Watters was reacting to Walz's appearance on the This is Gavin Newsom podcast, where Walz said that MAGA voters are "scared" of his masculinity because he doesn't joke that he can fix a truck and that MAGA focused on attacking him for his masculinity "obsessively" during the 2024 presidential election. Watters's comments were widely ridiculed as revealing his insecurity on social media, according to The Independent. An image of him and Donald Trump, whom he strongly supports, drinking from a straw, surfaced on social media.

In April 2025, Watters said that "When you sit behind a screen all day, it makes you a woman, Studies have shown this", and as one of the panelists cackled, he repeated the claim while debating a MAGA author's claim that President Donald Trump's tariffs will reverse a crisis of masculinity in the U.S. by bringing back jobs requiring physical strength. He also said, "If you're out working ... you are around other guys; you're not around HR ladies and lawyers. That gives you estrogen". The Five co-host Jeanine Pirro pushed back, saying, "You sit behind a screen". The incident sparked backlash across social media.

In July 2026, following an announcement by Secretary of Defense Pete Hegseth calling for testosterone testing and treatment in the US military, Watters said on air, "You know what's going to happen? The guys that don't need it are gonna take it – triple boost. And then they're going to get out there and women on base, you better be careful", Watters said. "Port calls, women in Asia, you better be careful. Because these guys are going to be wild animals, and you better watch out." Critics equated this to making fun of rape in the military.

=== Comments about invading Canada ===
During a broadcast on 8 January 2025, Watters expressed a desire for a military invasion of Canada amidst the backdrop of United States presidential nominee Donald Trump's comments about turning Canada into America's 51st state. He stated: "Canada... the fact that they don't want us to take them over makes me want to invade. I want to quench my imperialist thirst." During an interview with the Premier of Ontario, Doug Ford, Watters said, "You say that Americans don't have a problem with Canadians, and we don't, but it seems like you have a problem with us. Because if I were a citizen of another country and I were a neighbor of the United States, I would consider it a privilege to be taken over by the United States of America. That's what everybody else in the world wants — American citizenship. For some reason, that's repellant to you Canadians, and I find that personally offensive."

=== Deportation of Kilmar Abrego Garcia ===
Watters backed the Trump administration's claim that the illegally deported Maryland man is a terrorist, saying that Garcia wearing a Chicago Bulls hat "means you're MS-13" and "hang around with high-ranking gangsters". Watters said that "Garcia is a Bulls fan, but he's from El Salvador and he lives in Maryland, not Chicago". He added, "The Bulls lost 60 games in 2019, so why the hat? Can Garcia name anyone on the team? Anyone on any Bulls team besides Jordan? Everyone from El Salvador knows what it means when you wear a Bulls hat; it means you're MS-13. When you're in Compton, you don't accidentally wear red and say: 'Oh, I didn't know red was Bloods.' If you're a Latin American illegal alien in Maryland, you don't accidentally wear Chicago Bulls gear and hang around with high-ranking gangsters from MS-13." He also ridiculed the idea that Abrego Garcia fled El Salvador because his family's pupusa shop had been shaken down by local gang members, resulting in increasing threats of violence.

=== Calling for the physical destruction of the UN ===
While reviewing difficulties Donald Trump had navigating the United Nations, Watters offhandedly offered the following: "What we need to do is either leave the U.N. or we need to bomb it", Watters said. "Maybe gas it ... we need to destroy it." Sources indicate that he apologized for the statement.
