= Newsstand (disambiguation) =

Newsagent's shop, or newsstand, is a business that sells newspapers, magazines, cigarettes, snacks and often items of local interest.

Newsstand may also refer to:

- CNN NewsStand, a project to create CNN programming associated with publications owned by Time Warner
- Newsstand (software), an iOS app which can download and display newspapers and magazines
