= McEnroe (talk show) =

American television series

- Genre: Talk show
- Presented by: John McEnroe
- Starring: John Fugelsang
- Music by: Patty Smyth

Original release
- Network: CNBC
- Release: July 7 – December 15, 2004

McEnroe is an American television talk show hosted by tennis player John McEnroe that was broadcast on CNBC from July 7 to December 15, 2004. It was taped at CNBC's New Jersey studio, and tapings began at about 2 p.m. The show aired Monday through Thursday on the network. McEnroe's wife, Patty Smyth, sang the show's theme song. His sidekick was John Fugelsang.

The show's first week averaged 174,000 viewers, a decline from the 200,000 viewers drawn by the predecessor in its time slot, The News with Brian Williams. The show was panned by critics right from its debut, and its ratings dropped precipitously through the following weeks; by mid-August, at least four episodes had registered a Nielsen rating of 0.0, and viewership hit a low of 35,000 people on August 10. When the show took a subsequent two-week break for CNBC's coverage of the 2004 Summer Olympics, Woody Fraser was brought in to be the executive producer to try to save the show. He suggested changing the appearance of the show, such as having McEnroe dress more professionally by wearing suits and ties and diminishing Fugelsang's involvement, but could not save the show's fortunes.

On December 3, 2004, CNBC executives sent a memo to network employees saying the show was being canceled. McEnroe was given the option of stopping production immediately or allowing the show to go two more weeks. McEnroe decided to let the show last two more weeks to give the show's crew more work before the show went off-air. The last episode aired on December 15, 2004. Its 10 pm slot was taken by another talk show, The Big Idea with Donny Deutsch.
