= Current TV =

American television channel (2005–2013)

- Second and final Current TV logo designed by Loyalkaspar and Wolff Olins, used from 2011 to 2013
- Headquarters: San Francisco, California, with secondary studios in Culver City, California, and New York City

Ownership
- Owner: INdTV Holdings (Al Gore and Joel Hyatt) (2005–2013); Al Jazeera Media Network (2013)
- Sister channels: Current TV UK (2007–2012)

History
- Launched: August 1, 2005
- Replaced: Newsworld International
- Closed: August 20, 2013
- Replaced by: Al Jazeera America; AJ+ and Jetty (later occupied former building, studio and used former infrastructure)

Current TV was an American television channel which broadcast from August 1, 2005, to August 20, 2013. Prior INdTV founders Al Gore and Joel Hyatt, with Ronald Burkle, each held a sizable stake in Current TV. Comcast and DirecTV each held a smaller stake.

The channel started out with user-generated content made by viewers in 15-minute blocks. In its final years, the channel later switched formats to become an independent news network aimed at progressive politics. Neither format brought the success that Gore and Hyatt had desired.

On January 2, 2013, it was announced that Current TV had been sold by Gore and Hyatt to Qatar-based broadcaster Al Jazeera Media Network. AJMN stated it planned to shut down the Current TV channel, retain its off-air staff, and to launch a new New York City-based channel named Al Jazeera America (using Current's distribution network). Current had operated in the same way with Newsworld International, a predecessor to Current. They also said they planned to scrap the channel's programming lineup and brand. Al Jazeera America replaced Current TV on August 20, 2013, at 3:00 pm Eastern, 2:00 pm Central time. The former headquarters would become the home of Al Jazeera's all-online digital channel AJ+.

== History ==
=== 2002–2006: Launch ===
After the 2000 U.S. presidential election, Gore and Hyatt wanted to start a conventional cable news network. The plan evolved into making a viewer-generated channel aimed at an audience demographic age 18–34.

On May 4, 2004, INdTV Holdings, a company co-founded by Gore and Hyatt in 2002, purchased Canada-based cable news channel NewsWorld International (NWI) from NBCUniversal for the express purpose of launching their new network with the space on some digital cable lineups (and DirecTV) that NWI had. The new network would not have political leanings, Gore said, but would serve as an "independent voice" for a target audience of people between 18 and 34 "who want to learn about the world in a voice they recognize and a view they recognize as their own." Other reports said that Gore hoped that the channel would help change the tide of "consolidation and conglomeratization" of the media by leading the change to "democratization." The news network was said to be a combination between CNN, MTV, and blipverts. In the summer of 2004, Gore and Hyatt announced their new network, named INdTV, with a series of public recruitment events. The first of these events was held at the Bambuddha Lounge in San Francisco's Tenderloin, on August 25, 2004.

On April 4, 2005, the former vice president with business partner Hyatt announced that they had changed the name of the network from "INdTV" to "Current TV". The new television network launched in the United States at midnight EDT on the morning of August 1, 2005. The first person heard on the channel was Conor Knighton, a staple during the early years of the channel introducing the channel with the show Google Current.

=== 2006–2008: Expansion and Yahoo! partnership ===
On September 20, 2006, Current TV started a short-lived partnership with Yahoo! to supply topic-specific "channels" to the Yahoo Video website. Called the Yahoo! Current Network, the first four channels, "Current Buzz", "Current Traveler", "Current Action" (about action sports), and "Current Driver" quickly became the most popular videos on the Yahoo Video web site. There were Yahoo branded segments on Current TV, similar to the Google Current segments. Additional web channels were planned. However, on December 6, 2006, Yahoo and Current TV announced the end of their relationship. Madeline Smithberg co-creator of The Daily Show, was the Executive Producer for this project.

On October 6, 2006, a deal was announced with BSkyB to create a localized UK and Ireland version of Current TV for its Sky satellite service. This version went live on March 12, 2007, on Sky channel 229 (later moving to 183) and Virgin Media channel 155. The first documentary aired on the launch was 'Tracking William, a Night With a Paparazzo' from director Daniel Florencio, a prolific contributor of the channel. In 2007, Current TV started video-on-demand service on Virgin Media. Current TV was also added to the Freewire IPTV network on channel 178. The channel closed on March 11, 2012, following BSkyB's withdrawal of support and a failed rescue attempt from Current TV.

On January 31, 2007, Current TV launched on Dish Network.

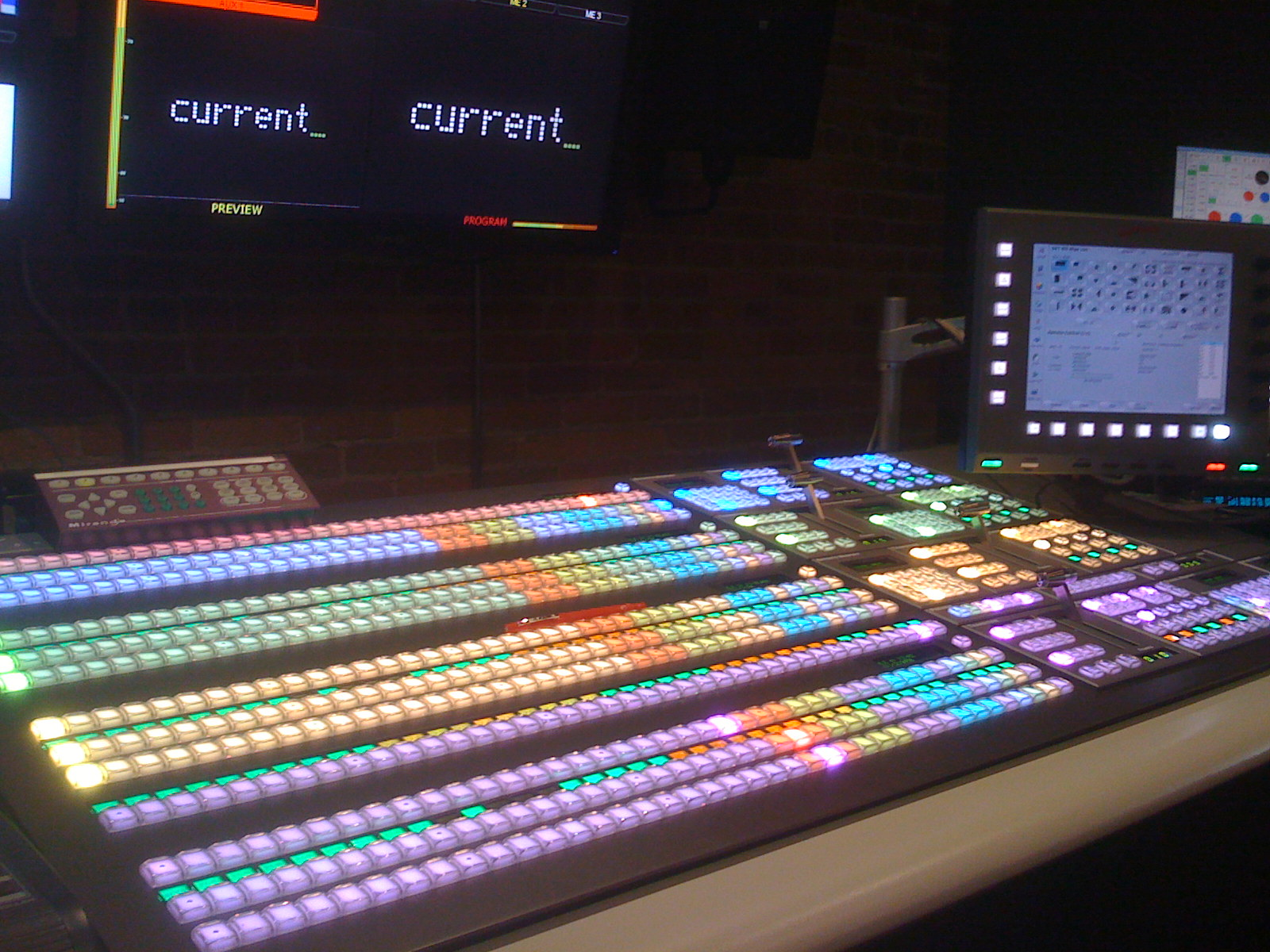
Former Current TV Control Room

On September 16, 2007, Current TV won an Emmy award for Best Interactive Television Service at the 59th Primetime Emmy Awards. This was the first year in which this Emmy was presented during the primetime broadcast. The award was presented by Masi Oka of Heroes fame and MySpace founder Tom Anderson (through their own computers), and Al Gore and Joel Hyatt accepted the award on their behalf.

On February 8, 2008, it was announced that the network would also be available on the Italian Sky Italia satellite digital platform on channel 130. According to the official website, broadcasts started on May 8, 2008. On June 6, 2008, it was announced that the network would also be available on the Italian 3 DVB-H mobile operator, free of charge. The channel closed on July 31, 2011, following failed distribution renegotiations with Sky Italia.

Current TV partnered with Twitter for the 2008 Presidential and Vice-Presidential debates, allowing viewers who watched the Current TV version of the debates to post live on Twitter and have their opinions shown on screen, live.

=== 2009–2010: Financial troubles and IPO plans ===
On January 28, 2009, Current Media Inc. announced that it intended to launch an initial public offering on the NASDAQ to raise US$100 million. However, it announced in early April that it was scrapping the plan due to "current market conditions" and that no securities had been sold, and all activity regarding the proposed IPO had been discontinued.

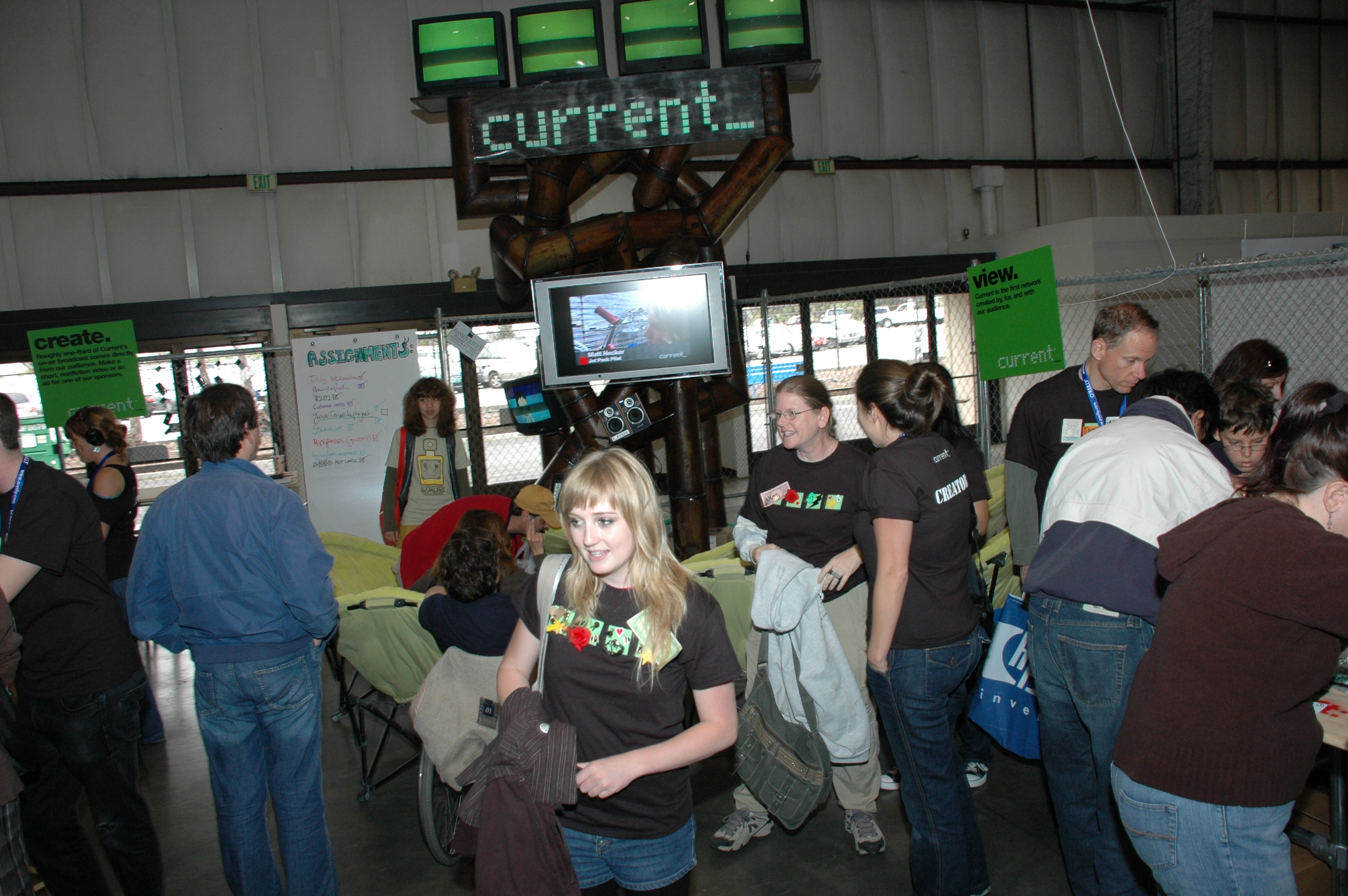
Current TV Booth in San Mateo at Maker Faire 2008

In June 2009, Current TV received approval from the Canadian Radio-television and Telecommunications Commission to establish a Canadian version of the channel, which would be a joint venture of Current TV and the CBC, with the CBC taking 80 percent ownership. The channel would be required to feature at least 35% Canadian content. The new service was planned to begin in Fall 2009, pending approval by the Treasury Board, but those plans were put on hold later that year.

In July 2009, Current TV made a series of changes due to financial reasons and the failed IPO. CEO Joel Hyatt resigned to a new vice president position and was replaced by Mark Rosenthal, the former COO and president of MTV Networks, with a plan to reform Current TV to more traditional programing. Lisa Derrick of The Huffington Post predicted that Current TV would undergo a transformation similar to MTV's transformation during Mark Rosenthal's 1990s tenure at MTV, from MTV's multi-minute music video format to longer 30 minute/1 hour reality television programing. Ultimately its assorted pod format was discontinued in lieu of traditional 30-minute block programing. Some elements of the pod format survived inside the themed 30-minute programing. In July 2009, 80 in-house staff were laid off, about 25% of Current's staff, and plans were announced to air licensed TV series and films and other content that was not produced by Current in-house or by the VC2 system. Andrew Wallenstein of The Hollywood Reporter predicted Current would make its targeted demographic a decade older from early 20s to early 30s, and add more less-serious entertainment programing to its then mostly news and reality/documentary format.

In late 2009, after the announcement of the Comcast-NBC Universal merger, Comcast Corporation submitted a filing to the US Securities and Exchange Commission that revealed it owned a ten percent stake of Current Media LLC. Current received three Emmy nominations in the news and documentary category in 2009.

In mid-2010, Current's Vanguard journalism program's piece, Oxycontin Express, received a Peabody Award, a first for both Mariana van Zeller, the journalist behind the story, and Current TV. Current also received a Headliner award. Around this time, a report by Reuters on the network's ongoing problems suggested that it could have blossomed into something akin to YouTube's video-sharing platform, MSNBC's role as a left-leaning news outlet, or even the Oprah Winfrey Network. "In retrospect", the report concluded, "what's distinctive about Current's troubles was that Gore's vision had so much potential. It's uncanny how close he was to capitalizing on several key trends that transformed the media world, only to watch others do so."

=== 2009: North Korea incident ===
On March 17, 2009, the North Korean military detained two American journalists, Euna Lee and Laura Ling, working for Current TV, after they allegedly crossed into North Korea from China. On March 30, 2009, North Korean state media reported that preparations were under way for indictments and a trial, saying, "The illegal entry of US reporters into the DPRK [Democratic People's Republic of Korea] and their suspected hostile acts have been confirmed by evidence and their statements." The two faced trial on June 4. On June 8, Reuters reported that the two reporters were found guilty of illegal entry and committing "hostile acts against the DPRK" and subsequently sentenced to twelve years of hard labor. On August 4, BBC News reported that Lee and Ling were pardoned amidst a visit by former U.S. president Bill Clinton to North Korea.

=== 2011 major format changes ===
First Current TV logo by MetaDesign (2005–2011)

Beginning early in 2011, Current TV started implementing major changes in programming and personnel, beginning with the hiring of Keith Olbermann. To signify these changes, Current unveiled new imaging and a new logo in May 2011, designed by branding firm Wolff Olins and Loyalkaspar.

On February 8, 2011, Keith Olbermann announced that he had been hired to host a new primetime show on Current TV and was named Chief News Officer with an equity stake in the network. In April 2011, Olbermann announced that his nightly program would retain the same title from his time at MSNBC. On June 20, 2011, Countdown with Keith Olbermann relaunched on Current TV. The program aired Mondays through Fridays at 8 p.m. Eastern Time and was based out of New York City. Olbermann stated on The Colbert Report that Current TV was planning to make a nightly news segment consisting of his show and others that would launch later on Current TV.

In August 2011, Current announced that it had hired former CNN Bureau Chief and SVP of Programming David Bohrman as the network's new president. Bohrman later announced that after filling out its prime-time lineup, Current would also gradually begin shifting towards "a full daytime, morning schedule of news, information, analysis, conversation, context – all based on the events of the day" from an independent, progressive perspective.

On September 15, 2011, Current also announced that it had hired Shelley Lewis, former CNN and PBS executive producer, as executive vice president of programming.

On September 20, 2011, the network announced that Cenk Uygur of the internet-based TYT Network would be launching a TV edition of the internet news program The Young Turks in the fourth quarter of 2011. The program was broadcast from Los Angeles and aired weekdays at 7 p.m. Eastern Time. The program premiered on December 5, 2011.

On September 21, 2011, network president David Bohrman named Jason Odell as executive vice president of technology. Odell had an extensive career at both CNN and NBC, and was most recently known for creating (along with David Bohrman) and implementing CNN's "holographic" technology during election coverage.

On October 12, 2011, the network announced that it had hired former Michigan governor Jennifer Granholm to host her own weekday prime-time program The War Room with Jennifer Granholm. The program launched on January 30, 2012, at 9 p.m. Eastern Time.

=== 2012 major format changes ===
On March 5, 2012, Current announced an upcoming weekday morning block of programming with TV-friendly simulcasts of The Stephanie Miller Show (under the name Talking Liberally: The Stephanie Miller Show) and The Bill Press Show (under the name Full Court Press: The Bill Press Show). This was interpreted by Mediaite's Political Editor and White House Correspondent Tommy Christopher as an attempt to compete against MSNBC's Morning Joe (which aired from 6 am to 9 am). This morning block moved to Free Speech TV after Current TV folded and became Al Jazeera America.

On March 30, 2012, Current announced that Keith Olbermann had been fired and would no longer host a show on their network. A statement released by network founders Al Gore and Joel Hyatt explained how the network's "values are no longer reflected" in Current's relationship with Olbermann, and that former New York Governor Eliot Spitzer would begin hosting Viewpoint effective immediately in the time slot previously occupied by Olbermann.

On April 18, 2012, Current announced that California Lt. Governor Gavin Newsom would host a show titled The Gavin Newsom Show, while concurrently serving as lieutenant governor.

In June 2012, it was formally announced that Joy Behar would be getting another talk show, Joy Behar: Say Anything!, premiering September 4, 2012 on the Current TV network. Its content was expected to be in line with her previous HLN series The Joy Behar Show. Before the new show's launch, Behar began acting as fill-in host for Eliot Spitzer's Current TV talk show, Viewpoint with Eliot Spitzer, starting on July 18, 2012.

=== 2013: Acquisition by Al Jazeera ===
On January 2, 2013, Al Jazeera Media Network announced that it had purchased Current Media, LLC and would be closing down the Current TV channel while launching and integrating the remains of Current into a new American news channel titled Al Jazeera America using its distribution network. Prior to the sale, it was believed that Al Gore and Joel Hyatt each owned approximately twenty percent of Current Media, business magnate Ronald Burkle owned about twenty-five percent, and Comcast and DirecTV each owned more than five percent. The terms of the deal were undisclosed. According to Forbes and The New York Times, the purchase was about US$500 million. The purchase by Al Jazeera occurred after an attempt by TheBlaze to purchase the media company was rejected in 2012.

Immediately after the announcement, Time Warner Cable and Bright House Networks, which both broadcast Current TV to nine million American homes, announced they would be dropping the channel, but said they would consider airing Al Jazeera America. It was previously reported in April 2012 that TWC and Bright House were considering to drop the channel due to low ratings. Al Jazeera America still replaced Current TV on Comcast, Dish Network, Verizon and DirecTV. AT&T dropped Current TV the morning before it changed to Al Jazeera America prompting a lawsuit for breach of contract from Al Jazeera Media Network. Time Warner and Bright House later added Al Jazeera America on December 6, 2013, after a new deal was signed 2 months earlier. AT&T would add the channel on June 27, 2014.

Defending his decision, Current TV chairman Al Gore wrote: "I am incredibly proud of what Current has been able to accomplish. But broadcast media is a business, and being an independent content producer in a time of increasing consolidation is a challenge." In a news release, Al Jazeera Director General Ahmed bin Jassim Al Thani said,

"By acquiring Current TV, Al Jazeera will significantly expand our existing distribution footprint in the U.S., as well as increase our newsgathering and reporting efforts in America [...] We look forward to working together with our new cable and satellite partners to serve our new audiences across the U.S."

The Al Jazeera network also expected to increase its U.S.-based staff to a total of more than 300 employees and retain most of Current's staff.

In addition to ending the Current TV channel, Al Jazeera announced it was scrapping the channel's programming lineup, as well as its brand. On January 2, Cenk Uygur, host of the weekday Young Turks with Cenk Uygur, stated at the time that the Current TV show would continue for at least three months and that he was open to staying with the new network. Later, after the end of Current, in a Los Angeles Times interview, Uygur remarked about the loss of the television show that he felt "relieved" that he could move on and focus on his web show and site and that he "was exhausted from doing the two shows at once;" also that "The future is overwhelmingly online" and he was excited to turn his energies there. It was also mentioned that after the acquisition of Current, he had brief talks with Al Jazeera America about whether there would be a place for him and the show, but both sides agreed that Uygur, known for political rants, would not fit well with the company's plans to build a news source with a more neutral tone.

That same day, Jennifer Granholm, host of The War Room with Jennifer Granholm, announced that she would leave the channel as a result of the acquisition, as did Gavin Newsom, host of The Gavin Newsom Show, who was reported to have planned on leaving the network earlier. On Sunday, January 6, Eliot Spitzer announced that he had left the network and his weekday show Viewpoint with Eliot Spitzer.

It was announced in an article in Politico at the time of the purchase that Bill Press didn't expect to continue his show with Al Jazeera once the change officially took place. Press also didn't expect Stephanie Miller to continue her show on Al Jazeera. Press said he would look for TV coverage to replace Current but expected having trouble finding a replacement. On August 1, 2013, Press announced that his show's simulcast would move to Free Speech TV on September 3, 2013. Stephanie Miller announced later after a hiatus from television syndaication that her show would also move to Free Speech TV in January 2014.

In a January 22, 2013, article in Politico Al Jazeera spokesman Stan Collender said the network's launch would be pushed back to within six months, and would create "multiple hundreds of new jobs" and new bureaus around the country. They announced the hiring of 105 total jobs for the new network, with 98 in New York and seven in Washington, D.C. On July 3, 2013, Ali Velshi announced on his Twitter account that the network would replace Current on August 20, 2013.

The last live show on Current was Viewpoint with John Fugelsang, ending on August 15, 2013. Al Jazeera America launched and replaced Current on August 20, 2013, at 3:00pm EDT.

On August 16, 2014, Al Gore launched a lawsuit against Al Jazeera Media Network claiming a residual payment of $65 million of the sale proceeds held in an escrow account, due in 2014, remained unpaid. In September Al Jazeera Media Network launched a lawsuit against Al Gore.

Al Jazeera America shut down on April 12, 2016, citing the "economic landscape and the highly competitive nature of the American media market" as reasons to shut down the channel. After use by three networks since 1994, the channel space folded after Al Jazeera failed to sell it to another network.

== Remains ==
Al Jazeera maintained Current TV's former San Francisco headquarters as the headquarters for its all online digital channel AJ+ until late 2018 which included use of the former The War Room studio and its podcast network Jetty. The building was also home to Al Jazeera's digital team and other departments as well as the base for the show Fault Lines.

Elsewhere, The Young Turks still use their main news desks, background graphics and lighting from Current TV in their new studio; Bill Press uses the same cameras and equipment from his Current TV simulcast to show his simulcast on Free Speech TV. Press also has the same background on camera featuring the Full Court Press name from the former Current TV simulcast.

During Al Jazeera America's existence, Current's New York City studios were home to the Al Jazeera America shows On Point with Ali Velshi and Third Rail. Many of the people formerly employed by Current stayed on with the new network, most notably Christof Putzel, formerly of the Current TV series Vanguard, who became an investigative reporter for Al Jazeera America's show America Tonight. Michael Shure formerly of The War Room left but came back to the channel as a political contributor. David Shuster, another former Current TV face, remained with the network becoming a reporter and fill-in host.

All of the videos on Current TV's YouTube channel were removed. However, as of November 2025, the channel remains online, albeit with no content.

== Prior programming ==
- Countdown with Keith Olbermann was Current's first live nightly news and commentary program, which Olbermann originally hosted on MSNBC. The show aired from June 20, 2011, until March 29, 2012, after which Olbermann was fired.
- InfoMania was a weekly satirical news show hosted by Conor Knighton and later Brett Erlich.
- SuperNews!
- Politically Direct 2012 was Current TV's live special program covering aspects of the 2012 presidential election, such as debate analysis. It featured Current hosts, contributors, and special guests.
- 50 Documentaries to See Before You Die was a five-part series hosted by Morgan Spurlock.
- The Gavin Newsom Show was a show hosted by California Lieutenant Governor Gavin Newsom.
- Full Court Press with Bill Press was a live simulcast of The Bill Press Show (political commentary). The show ended on Current TV on August 15, 2013, with the end of live programming on the network, and relaunched on Free Speech TV on September 9, 2013.
- Talking Liberally was a live simulcast of The Stephanie Miller Show (political satire). The show ended on Current TV on August 15, 2013, with the end of live programming on the network, and later relaunched on Free Speech TV.
- The War Room with Michael Shure was a politics-based analysis and commentary program hosted by Jennifer Granholm until February 7, 2013. The show ended on Current TV on August 15, 2013, with the end of all live programming on the network.
- The Young Turks with Cenk Uygur was the TV edition of the internet news program The Young Turks. The TV edition ended on Current TV on August 15, 2013, with the end of all live programming on the network. The Young Turks continues with the main original online show.
- Viewpoint was a nightly news and commentary program hosted by Eliot Spitzer until January 6, 2013, and later by John Fugelsang. The show ended on Current TV on August 15, 2013, with the end of all live programming on the network.
- Joy Behar: Say Anything! was a nightly general talk/interview program show hosted by Joy Behar that ended on August 1, 2013, but remained airing with reruns until August 15, 2013.

=== Other programs ===
- Vanguard was Current's in-house journalism department, consisting of a team of young producers and correspondents who specialized in enterprising reporting on global issues. Vanguard was reorganized and merged into Al Jazeera America's documentary and investigative teams. As such, the final Current broadcast was a rerun of "The Oxycontin Express" documentary at 2:00pm Eastern time on August 20, 2013.

== List of hosts ==
- Adam Yamaguchi – Vanguard correspondent
- Amaya Brecher
- Ana Kasparian co-host and producer of The Young Turks
- Anthony Marshall
- Angela Sun
- Anne Foy
- Ben Hoffman – later with Comedy Central
- Brett Erlich – infoMania, Campaign Update, Viral Video Film School, co-host of the Rotten Tomatoes Show, The War Room with Michael Shure
- Bryan Safi
- Cenk Uygur – hosted The Young Turks
- Christof Putzel – Vanguard Correspondent continued with Al Jazeera America on America Tonight.
- Conor Knighton – InfoMania
- Daniel Florencio – UK VC2 Contributor
- Donna Ruko
- Douglas Caballero
- Elizabeth Chambers
- Eliot Spitzer
- Ellen Fox – co-hosted the Rotten Tomatoes Show
- Gavin Newsom – hosted The Gavin Newsom Show
- Gotham Chopra
- Graeme Smith – later with Real Radio
- Jael de Pardo
- Jared Leto
- Jason Silva (of "Max and Jason")
- Jennifer Granholm – hosted The War Room
- Joe Hanson – Joe Gets, What's Wrong With
- John Fugelsang
- Joy Behar
- Julia Hardy
- Kaj Larsen – Vanguard correspondent
- Keith Olbermann – Countdown With Keith Olbermann
- Kinga Philipps
- Laura Ling – Vanguard correspondent; detained by North Korea in 2009; later with E!
- Lindsay Barrasse (TheLindsayBoo)- freelancer/travel correspondence, WTF segment
- Mariana van Zeller – Vanguard correspondent later with National Geographic
- Max Lugavere (of "Max and Jason")
- Michael Shure – appeared on The Young Turks, also briefly hosted The War Room with Michael Shure. Continued on Al Jazeera America and later at i24 News as a political contributor and remains on The Young Turks.
- Michelle Lombardo
- Milo McCabe
- Nick Carter – a.k.a. Murs
- Nzinga Blake
- Rowly Dennis
- Sarah Haskins
- Sergio Cilli
- Shauntay Hinton
- Zara Martin

== Other reading ==
- 'Betting a Network on Youths Who Think' – New York Times article, August 22, 2005
- Current TV at one year – Associated Press, July 27, 2006
- 'The Other Man Behind Current TV' – Broadcasting and Cable. About CEO Joel Hyatt, November 19, 2006
- "All Eyes on The Shins". Wired. January 2007. Archived from the original on January 5, 2007.
- Current TV makes its move -Gore promotes new network to overseas markets. Variety, March 12, 2007
- Current TV's V-CAMs (Viewer Created Ad Messages) – Adweek
- Current TV Tops 50 MM Subs – Multichannel News, March 12, 2007
- Al Gore's Low Voltage Network, November 12, 2007
- Interview with Robin Sloan, New Media Director at Current, Intruders tv Video, April 2009
- Al Gore and Time Warner Cable Global Online Town Hall Meeting on Education About the Global Online Town Hall organized by Time Warner Cable and Michael Franzini in partnership with Current TV
