= Dream On (film) =

- Directed by: Roger Weisberg
- Produced by: Roger Weisberg
- Starring: John Fugelsang
- Distributed by: PBS
- Release date: November 8, 2015 (Kansas International Film Festival)
- Country: United States
- Language: English

Dream On is a 2015 American documentary film starring John Fugelsang.

== Overview ==
Comedian John Fugelsang set outs to see if the American Dream is still alive by retracing the journey taken across the United States by French historian Alexis de Tocqueville in 1831 that inspired his 1835 book Democracy in America, which gave birth to the concept of the American Dream.
