= The Gavin Newsom Show =

2012–2013 American television series

- Genre: Talk show
- Presented by: Gavin Newsom
- Country of origin: United States

Production
- Executive producer: Mia Haugen
- Production location: San Francisco
- Running time: 60 minutes

Original release
- Network: Current TV
- Release: May 18, 2012 – January 2013

The Gavin Newsom Show was a weekly one-hour talk show hosted by Gavin Newsom, which aired on San Francisco–based Current TV from 2012 to 2013. The show featured one-on-one interviews with notable residents of California, guests included Marissa Mayer and Sergey Brin.

Mia Haugen, a former executive at TheStreet, Forbes and CNN, was the executive producer.

It was, according to Newsom, "a political show without politicians. Meaning, I'm in politics, I'm on a network that's dominantly political, and I happen to believe, firmly, that for politics to change, public policy needs to change, meaning the best politics is the better idea. And, we cannot restrict ourselves in the political dialogue to sourcing ideas from the politicians and pundits."

== History ==
Originally, Newsom asked Current TV if they would let him use their equipment to do a YouTube channel; they rejected that request, with a proposal instead that he do his show on their network.

The show was a replacement for Countdown with Keith Olbermann and premiered on May 18, 2012, with guests Lance Armstrong, Marissa Mayer, and Nick Bilton.

== Cancellation ==
On January 2, 2013, it was announced that the show was going off the air. According to his spokesman "The Gavin Newsom Show was a great opportunity for which he is grateful," spokesman Peter Ragone said in a prepared statement. "The lieutenant governor's's original agreement with Current is set to expire this month and he had already decided on moving in a new direction." According to his spokesman the departure was unrelated to Current's acquisition by Al Jazeera Media Network which happened around the same time.

== See also ==
- This is Gavin Newsom
