= Conor Knighton =

American actor, host, and TV producer

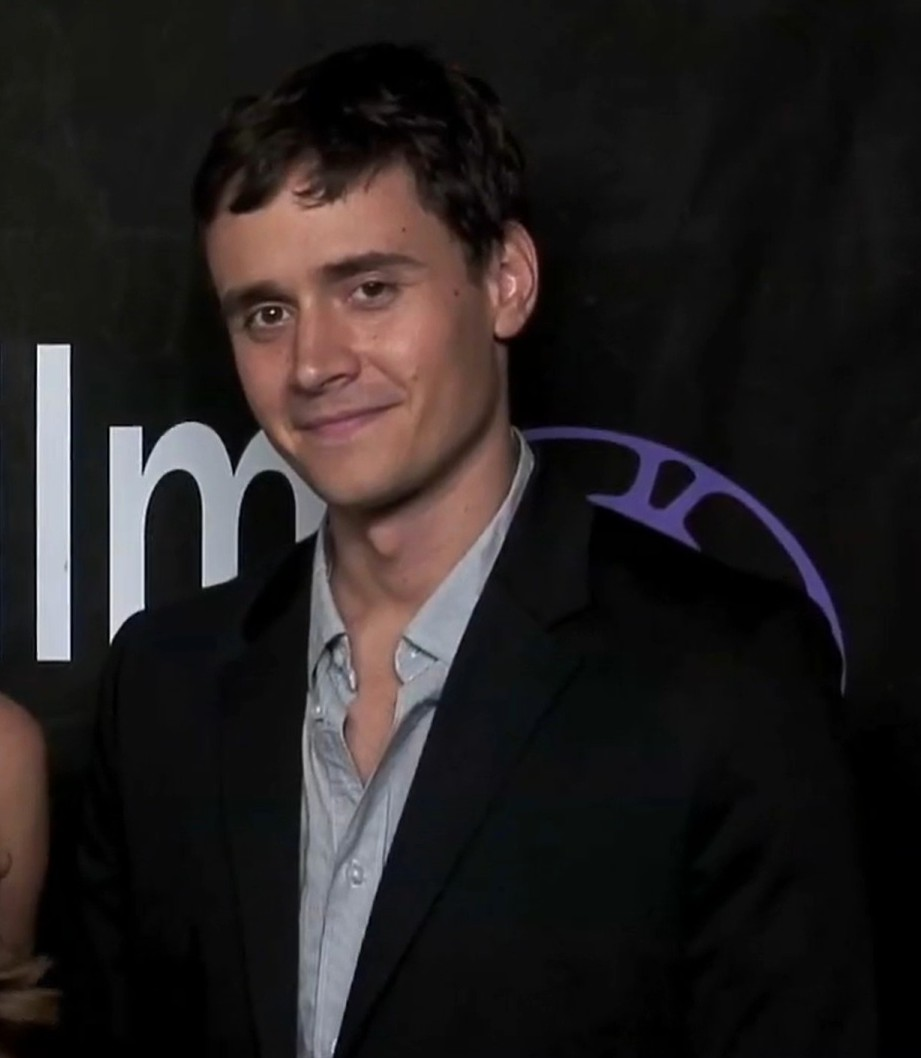
- Knighton in 2009
- Born: February 1, 1981 (age 45)
- Occupations: Actor, television host, producer

Conor Knighton (born February 1, 1981) is an American actor, host, and television producer. He is a correspondent for CBS Sunday Morning. In 2016, Knighton launched "On The Trail," a year-long, cross-country look at America's National Parks. The reports air every other week on CBS Sunday Morning. It was to honor the 100th anniversary of the National Park Service. Knighton has won two Daytime Emmys as part of the Sunday Morning team.

Knighton was the first person to appear on Current TV when it launched on August 1, 2005, and hosted several programs and live events for the network. He was the host and executive producer of InfoMania, Current's first half-hour show. He left the show at the end of 2010.

He has appeared, as an actor, in shows such as the Gilmore Girls. AMC tapped him to host The Movie List, a weekly countdown of popular movie trivia. In 2011, he hosted the Biography Channel show, My Viral Video. His work has been featured on E!, CNN, CNN Headline News, MTV, TV Guide Channel, Oxygen, and KNBC Los Angeles. He was a regular panelist on E!'s Chelsea Lately.

In 2012, the EW Scripps Company (one of the nation's largest independent television station owners) hired Conor to create and host a daily look at travel, finance, and consumer issues.

As a correspondent for KCET's SoCal Connected, Knighton was nominated for two Los Angeles Area Emmys and won a 2015 Los Angeles Press Club Award.

== Early years ==
Knighton grew up in Charleston, West Virginia, and attended George Washington High School. He is a graduate of Yale University.
