= InfoMania =

- Genre: Comedy; Satire; News parody
- Presented by: Brett Erlich
- Starring: Brett Erlich; Sergio Cilli; Ben Hoffman; Bryan Safi; Erin Gibson; Sarah Haskins
- Country of origin: United States

Production
- Running time: 22 minutes

Original release
- Network: Current TV
- Release: 12 July 2007 – 15 July 2011

InfoMania (stylized as infoMania) is an American half-hour weekly satirical news-show that aired on the Current TV television network from 2007 to 2011. The program was initially hosted by Conor Knighton and later Brett Erlich, with features by Ben Hoffman, Sergio Cilli, Sarah Haskins, Bryan Safi, Erin Gibson, and Ellen Fox.

== History ==
The program's executive producer was David Nickoll. Its original executive producer was The Daily Show's co-creator Madeleine Smithberg. For the majority of the show's life, the EP was Jeffrey Plunkett.

Stylistically similar to The Daily Show, InfoMania put a comedic spin on various pieces of popular culture in the United States, including outrageous news stories, video games, viral videos, as well as movies and music.

Prior to being produced in a full half-hour format, the show aired in short 3-5 minute installments, usually at the top of the hour. Before July 2007, the show rotated between names of Google Current and Current Buzz and was a part of Current TV's original programming when the network went on air in August 2005.

In September 2010, InfoMania began receiving a noticeable amount of negative feedback from their fanbase via Facebook and Current TV's website. This first came about following the removal of the ability to watch full episodes of the show on their website, as well as the addition of a live audience to the show. Current TV eliminated the audience from the show in response to these complaints, but they still refuse to post full episodes to the Internet.

On January 12, 2011 Conor Knighton announced his departure on the Current TV website. Brett Erlich became the new host with a new set, but kept the same correspondents returning January 20, 2011.

On July 1, 2011, Brett Erlich announced the July 15th episode would be the final episode of InfoMania.

The show aired Thursday at 11 pm ET/8 pm PT on Current TV before switching to Friday nights during its final month of production. Various segments can be viewed online at various social networking websites such as Hulu.

InfoMania was produced on the same lot as Mad Men in Hollywood, California.

== Correspondents ==
- Sergio Cilli featured segments "White Hot Top 5" and "Music Intervention"
- Ben Hoffman featured segments "InfoMania Editorial," "InfoMania Tech Report," "Kids Kouch!," and "Craigslist Interviews"
- Bryan Safi featured segment "That's Gay"
- Sarah Haskins featured segment "Target: Women"
- Erin Gibson featured segment "Modern Lady"
- Brett Erlich featured segments "Viral Video Film School" and "Rotten Tomatoes on InfoMania" (co-hosted with Ellen Fox)

== Segments ==
Title	Synopsis
"InfoMania Editorial"	Hosted by Ben Hoffman
"Target: Women"	Hosted by Sarah Haskins.
"Modern Lady"	Hosted by Erin Gibson. It was a follow-on to "Target: Women."
"The Rotten Tomatoes Show"	Previously a half-hour program that followed InfoMania, and became a segment on September 30, 2010, although it stopped appearing on the show after the 2010 season.
"Tech Report"	Hosted by Ben Hoffman.
"That's Gay"	Hosted by Bryan Safi.
"Viral Video Film School"	Hosted by Brett Erlich.
"White Hot Top 5"	Hosted by Sergio Cilli.
