= Viewpoint (talk show) =

- Presented by: Eliot Spitzer; John Fugelsang
- Country of origin: United States

Production
- Production location: New York City
- Running time: 60 minutes

Original release
- Network: Current TV
- Release: March 30, 2012 – August 15, 2013

Viewpoint is an American political talk show broadcast on Current TV in 2012 and 2013. Formerly known as Viewpoint with Eliot Spitzer, it was hosted by former New York Governor Eliot Spitzer until January 6, 2013. After that, it was hosted by John Fugelsang. Viewpoint began airing on March 30, 2012, as a replacement to Keith Olbermann, who was dismissed from his show in the same time slot. It was the second television talk show to be hosted by Spitzer, with his previous effort (Parker Spitzer, renamed In the Arena) having aired on CNN.

Eliot Spitzer announced on January 6, 2013, that he left the show and the network, saying that "journalism has been more a matter of projecting a particular approach to covering policies, to covering issues. It was a continuation of what I tried to do in government. And that doesn’t fit with their vision of what [Al Jazeera is] going to do." However, he did say that "I view Al Jazeera as a very serious journalistic outfit". For the remainder of its run, the show was hosted by comedian John Fugelsang. The show aired its final episode on August 15, 2013. Most of the staff moved to the talk show, Consider This, on Al Jazeera America.

== Bibliography ==
- Paterson, David "Black, Blind, & In Charge: A Story of Visionary Leadership and Overcoming Adversity."Skyhorse Publishing. New York, New York, 2020
