= Brett Erlich =

American political comedian (b.1982)

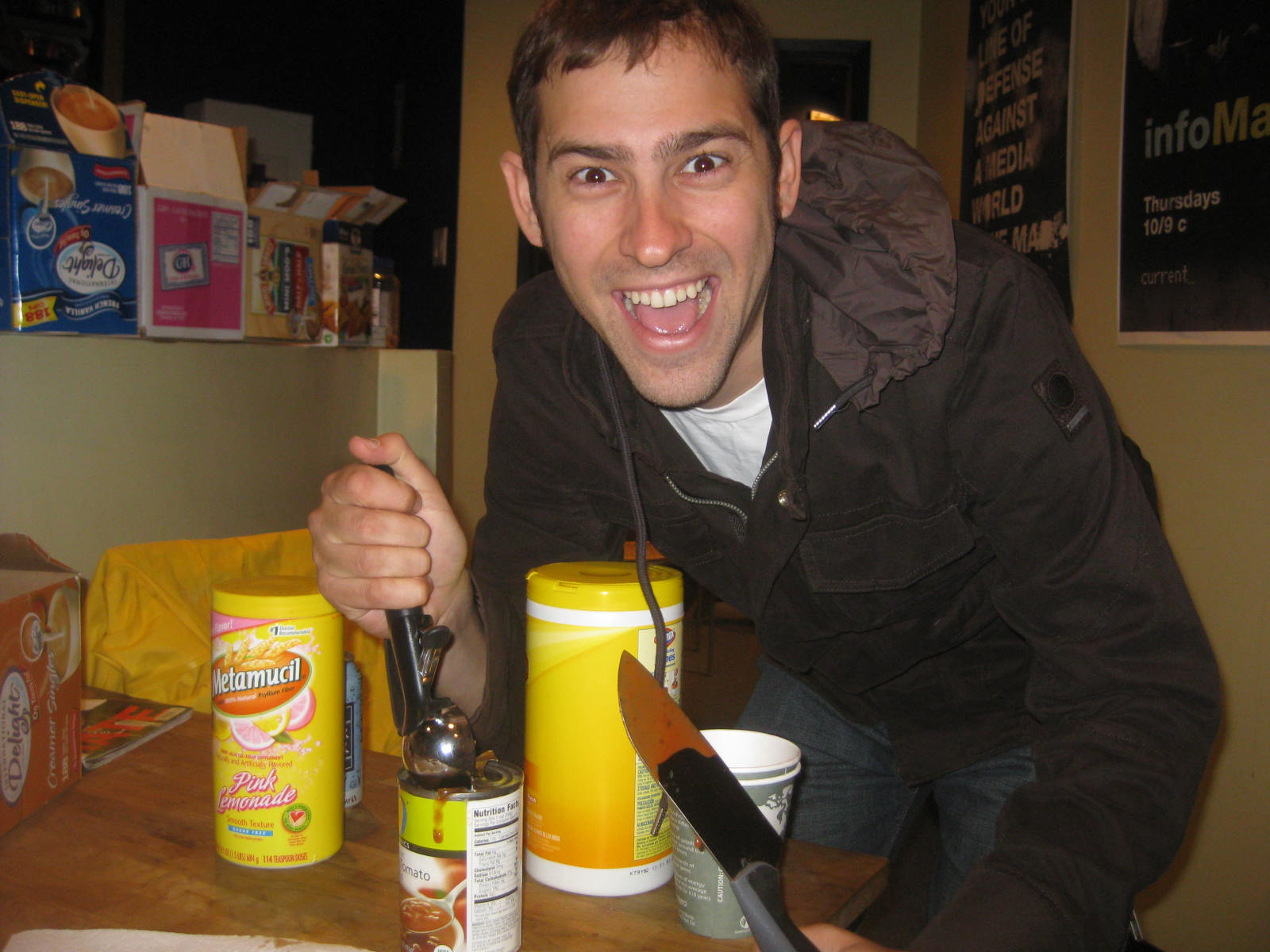
- Erlich in 2009
- Born: Brett Evan Erlich; March 1, 1982 (age 44); Los Angeles, California, U.S.
- Education: Stanford University (BA)
- Occupations: Comedian; Political Commentator; Writer; Producer; Television Host

Brett Evan Erlich (born March 1, 1982) is an American political comedian who works as a writer, producer, and host on TV shows and websites. He is the executive producer of The Young Turks network, where he also hosts "Happy Half Hour." He has also appeared on ABC News Primetime Specials hosted by Barbara Walters and Katie Couric.

From 2006 to 2011, Erlich was a writer, producer, and host of InfoMania, a comedic news show on the cable station Current TV. He formerly wrote, co-hosted (with Ellen Fox), and co-executive produced The Rotten Tomatoes Show (2009–2010). InfoMania was canceled in the summer of 2011.

From July 1, 2006, to July 9, 2007, Erlich wrote, associate-produced, and co-hosted Google Current.

== Early life and education ==
Born in 1982 in the San Fernando Valley near Los Angeles, California, he attended local public schools and graduated from high school at Chaminade College Preparatory in West Hills. He studied at Stanford University, graduating in 2004. While there, he co-founded the Stanford Shakespeare Society. This student-run company is devoted to the production and performance of Shakespearean drama and works influenced by Shakespeare.

== Career ==
Erlich has become established as a political comedian in TV shows and on the Web. From July 1, 2006, to July 9, 2007, Erlich wrote, associate-produced, and co-hosted Google Current.

From 2006 to 2011, Brett was a writer, producer, and host of InfoMania, a half-hour comedic news show on the cable station Current TV. It was created by Madeline Smithberg, who created The Daily Show with Jon Stewart, and executive producer David Nickoll.

Erlich formerly wrote, co-hosted (with Ellen Fox), and co-executive produced The Rotten Tomatoes Show on Current TV (2009–2010). After its cancellation, some of its material was compressed into a weekly 2-minute segment on InfoMania. This show was cancelled in the summer of 2011.

Erlich's segments on InfoMania and Google Current have included "Viral Video Film School," "Guilty Pleasures," "Men Menning," "Everybody's Doin' It," "Spam I Got," "Ostensibly on the Scene," "World Leader Flickr Sites," "Retroactive Interview," and "FearCast."

His show, Viral Video Film School, was nominated for a Webby Award in 2010 and was a People's Voice Winner in the Online Film & Video "How To & DIY" category.

His video Saw the Musical was nominated for a 2011 Webby in the Variety category but lost to Zach Galifianakis' Between Two Ferns.

In 2012 Erlich appeared in the independent feature Dead Dad.

In September 2013, Erlich became the host of Agents of S.H.I.E.L.D.: Declassified, a weekly online aftershow on ABC.com for Agents of S.H.I.E.L.D. Declassified features recaps, sketches, and featurettes to bring fans up to speed ahead of the next episode. Three expanded installments with guests were planned for the first season for its more "provocative storylines". He later appeared on Agents of S.H.I.E.L.D.: Academy's final episode.

== Personal life ==
In 2017, Erlich married his longtime girlfriend.
