= Mike X =

American author, speaker and content creator

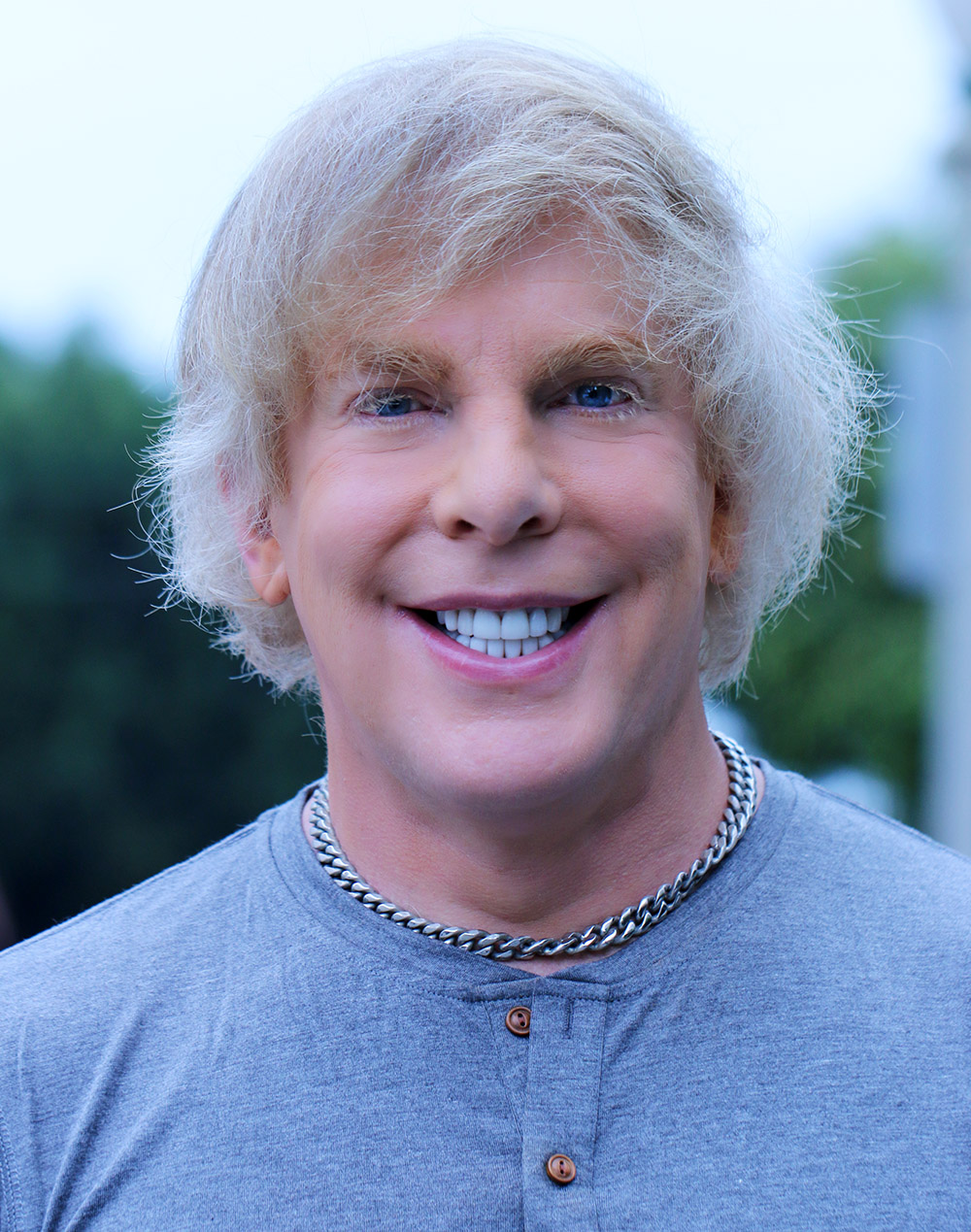
- Mike X, Los Angeles, 2022
- Born: New York City, U.S.
- Occupation: Entrepreneur, Author, motivational speaker, content creator
- Known for: Entrepreneurship, Motivational speaking, Content Creation, Filmmaking, Marketing, Directing TV Commercials, Brand Management, Design, Advertising

TikTok information
- Page: i_am_mike.x
- Followers: 250 thousand

YouTube information
- Channel: mike X
- Years active: 2020-present
- Genre: Personal Development
- Last updated: May 10, 2023
- Website: mikex.com

Michael X Franzini, known professionally as Mike X is an American entrepreneur, author, and content creator based in Venice Beach. He previously ran X-UP, a creative firm with offices in LA, Austin and New York. In 2023, he released a Self-help book Your Best Life: Tactics, Tools and Insights to Create a Life of Fulfillment, Joy and Abundance.

== Photography ==
In possibly the first viral campaign to use currency as its medium, Franzini minted 250,000 coins resembling pennies and entered them into circulation in New York City. He made a X-Up Case Study: Currency as an advertising medium – X-Up: Creative Vision about the campaign. In 2011, Johnson & Johnson hired Michael X Franzini to travel to all 50 states to photograph one baby in each state. Each baby was photographed with one or both parents, sharing a moment of "everyday joy." The book was launched on The View on Mother's Day 2011. His images have appeared in art galleries around the world, including Peter Hay Halpert Fine Art.

== Activism ==
In 1998, along with Jon Kamen and Frank Scherma, the founders of @radical.media, Franzini founded Public Interest, a 501(c)(3) nonprofit dedicated to creating advertising for good causes.

To address young people's lack of awareness of the Holocaust, Franzini partnered with MTV and the creative group at Arnold Worldwide and Crispin Porter + Bogusky to make the Holocaust more relevant to American teens today. He created a series of TV spots that portray events from the Holocaust taking place in a modern setting.

In 2012, Franzini wrote and directed TV spots featuring Will.i.am to motivate young Americans to get interested in math and science, as a means of addressing America's STEM crisis.

Working with Rock the Vote in Los Angeles to shed light on young people's attitudes towards discrimination and bias, Franzini organized a social experiment in which kids at a skate park were segregated by security guards according to eye color. The surprising result was that virtually all of the kids complied without any objection. In another setting—at a drive-through hot-dog establishment in the San Fernando Valley—Franzini put up signs that read "customers with foreign accents will be charged double" next to the menu board. In this case, the outcome was that no passive bystander (i.e. individual not being charged double) objected to the policy. To combat teens' indifference to the threat of STD's, Franzini and MTV created a campaign in which teens were shown recklessly refusing protection in non-sexual contexts, such as riding a roller coaster and going shark diving. Franzini organized an online town hall meeting with Al Gore. Franzini wrote talking points for Gore and directed Gore in the one-hour live event.

Tim Gill, creator of Quark and founder of the Gill Foundation, gave Franzini a budget of US$1M to "move the needle" on attitudes towards marriage equality, in Colorado Springs, which is widely considered the epicenter of anti-gay sentiment in America, because it is the location of the headquarters of Focus on the Family. Franzini assembled a team that created a fictional dog named Norman, who happened to be born different: instead of barking, he moos. Norman came to life in five TV spots, on billboards, banners on downtown street lamps, yard signs and via guerilla advertising.

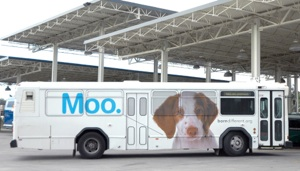
A bus wrap created as part of the Norman campaign

The campaign succeeded in changing public opinion and sparked an international controversy and led to an announcement by James Dobson, head of Focus on the Family, that he had a dog named Sherman, who barks, because God intended for dogs to bark. Dobson explained that, "if Sherman ever felt tempted to moo, he would take steps to cure himself of this unnatural behavior."

in 2006 he became Executive Creative Director of the STAND UP Campaign to improve America's education system. The Bill and Melinda Gates Foundation unveiled the STAND UP Campaign on The Oprah Winfrey Show

Franzini often speaks and consults on marketing to teens. He delivered the Keynote Address at the Ypulse Youth Mashup, an event for marketers trying to reach young Americans. He also spoke on U.S. youth culture at the Southern Growth Conference, at annual event attended by the governors of 13 Southern States.

== Books ==
- One Hundred Young Americans, published by HarperCollins.
- Wounded Warriors, a photo essay created for the Wounded Warrior Project.
- "Faces", a collection of images Franzini shot for T-mobile.
- "Treasuring Everyday Joy", a collection of images Franzini shot for Johnson's Baby in all 50 states.
