= This Is Gavin Newsom =

American political podcast

- Genre: Political podcast
- Country of origin: United States
- Language: English

Cast and voices
- Hosted by: Gavin Newsom

Technical specifications
- Video format: YouTube
- Audio format: Spotify; Apple Podcasts

Publication
- No. of episodes: 84
- Original release: March 6, 2025
- Provider: iHeartMedia

Reception
- Ratings: 3/5 (Apple Podcasts)

Related

YouTube information
- Channel: This Is Gavin Newsom
- Years active: 2025–present
- Subscribers: 266 thousand
- Views: 15.09 million
- Last updated: November 13, 2026

This Is Gavin Newsom is a political podcast hosted by American politician and businessman Gavin Newsom, the 40th governor of California. The podcast aims to expand his national audience by participating in extended discussions with various political media personalities. Its trailer was released on February 26, 2025. Its first episode later aired on March 6, 2025, with conservative activist and co-founder of Turning Point USA Charlie Kirk as his first guest. As of November 12, 2026, 84 episodes of This Is Gavin Newsom have been released. On June 15, 2025, the show's YouTube channel received a Silver Creator award for surpassing 100,000 subscribers. On October 4, 2025, it surpassed 200,000 subscribers. On June 5, 2026, it surpassed 250,000 subscribers.

== Background ==
In February 2025, iHeartMedia and Gavin Newsom announced their collaboration on his new podcast, This Is Gavin Newsom. A trailer was released shortly thereafter. In the podcast episodes, Newsom discusses political and social issues with his guests. They are structured to be one-on-one conversations. Newsom aims to release a new podcast every week; each episode aims to be around 45 minutes long, but the length can vary. Notable guests such as Charlie Kirk, Tim Walz, and Ezra Klein have also made interviews on his podcast. Newsom chooses his guests to widen his understanding of Donald Trump's victory in the 2024 United States presidential election, reflecting his interest of the Republican Party's prior branding for Trump's presidential campaign. He converses with them to explore differing viewpoints across the political spectrum. Newsweek said that "Newsom defended his podcast as a chance to have the conversations the Democratic Party refuses to have…"

Although most episodes feature conservatives, some contain liberal voices. Newsom believes his podcast gave him the opportunity to interview with people he disagrees with. He has touted his podcast as a form of understanding the motivations of the MAGA movement; also referencing how the Democratic Party can proceed after the loss of Kamala Harris in the 2024 election. Newsom discusses the effects of political divides in his podcast by conversing with these people. Newsom's podcast is arranged with iHeartMedia, an American mass media corporation; he does not receive any compensation from it.

== Episodes ==
No.	Title	Original release date
0	"Introducing: This Is Gavin Newsom"	March 6, 2025
Newsom announced the release of his podcast, teasing the conversations he would participate in.
1	"And, This Is Charlie Kirk"	March 6, 2025
Newsom spoke with Charlie Kirk. Newsom discussed with Kirk the success of Turning Point USA, and the Harris-Walz campaign in 2024; Kirk challenged him on his liberal stances, which gained extensive media coverage.
2	"And, This Is Michael Savage"	March 10, 2025
Newsom spoke with Michael Savage, a conversative political commentator. They engaged in a discussion surrounding his political ideology.
3	"And, This Is a Menendez Brothers Update"	March 11, 2025
Newsom gave an update about Lyle and Erik Menendez (commonly referred to as the "Menendez Brothers"), who both killed their parents.
4	"And, This Is Steve Bannon"	March 12, 2025
Newsom spoke with Steve Bannon, a former political chief strategist for Donald Trump. They spoke about political policy, such as tariffs and tax cuts.
5	"And, This Is Governor Walz"	March 18, 2025
Newsom spoke with Tim Walz, the Governor of Minnesota. They discussed about the Democratic Party's reputation, loss of men, and its brand of populism.
6	"And, This Is Ezra Klein"	March 26, 2025
Newsom spoke with Ezra Klein, a podcaster and writer at The New York Times. They discussed the importance of Klein's recently authored book titled Abundance.
7	"And, This Is How Trump's Tariffs Cost You Money with Anthony Scaramucci"	April 4, 2025
Newsom spoke with Anthony Scaramucci, an American financier, to discuss the possible effects of Trump's tariffs in the second term of his presidency. They also discuss about the failures and successes of the Harris-Walz campaign, as stated by Newsom.
8	"And, This is Rahm Emanuel on How Crony Capitalism And Trump's Tariffs Will Kill The "American Dream""	April 16, 2025
Newsom spoke with Rahm Emanuel about California suing the Trump Administration on tariffs, Trump's attacks on institutions of higher education, the destruction of American credibility, and what to do when Americans can no longer achieve the American Dream.
9	"And, This is Who Actually Raises Our Young Men With Scott Galloway"	April 20, 2025
Newsom spoke with Scott Galloway about masculinity in America, how young men are failing and ways to address it.
10	"And, This is How Climate Change is Coming For All Of Us"	April 22, 2025
Newsom spoke with United States senator Sheldon Whitehouse (D-RI) on the legacy of Earth Day, the financial impacts of climate change and the alleged breach of trust by large oil companies.
11	"And, I'm Talking To You About Tariffs"	April 28, 2025
Newsom spoke with four small business owners on the impact of the Trump trade tariffs.
12	"And, This is How The 2024 Election Was Won with Amie Parnes and Jonathan Allen"	April 30, 2025
Newsom spoke with Amie Parnes and Jonathan Allen about their book Fight: Inside the Wildest Battle for the White House which covered the 2024 United States presidential election.
13	"And, This is How Democrats Win Back Men with Jackson Katz"	May 7, 2025
Newsom spoke with Jackson Katz about the manosphere, feminism, and whether the Trump administration is actually good for men. There is explicit language and discussion of sexual violence. This episode is not available on YouTube.
14	"And, This is A Republican Without A Country with Frank Luntz"	May 14, 2025
Newsom spoke with pollster and Republican strategist Frank Luntz about the 2024 Kamala Harris presidential campaign, messaging of Democratic candidates, and whether MAGA voters will ever abandon President Trump.
15	"And, This is How Republicans Kill Medicaid with Senator Amy Klobuchar"	May 21, 2025
Newsom spoke with United States senator Amy Klobuchar (D-MN) about Medicaid cuts, the One Big Beautiful Bill Act, and personal experiences with presidents Biden and Trump.
16	"And, This is Speaker Newt Gingrich"	May 28, 2025
Newsom spoke with former House speaker Newt Gingrich about his opinions on the Department of Government Efficiency and his first impressions of Donald Trump.
17	"And, This is More With Speaker Newt Gingrich"	May 30, 2025
Newsom continued the interview with Gingrich about his opinions on immigration, reminisces about dealing with Bill Clinton, and the current political climate.
18	"And, This is How Conflict Sells Tickets With Dr. Phil"	June 4, 2025
Newsom spoke with Phil McGraw about the eponymous Dr. Phil talk show, how his show portrayed conflict, and his experiences riding along with Immigrations and Customs Enforcement and with the U.S. military in the Middle East.
19	"And, This is More With Dr. Phil - Is Free Speech Under Attack?"	June 6, 2025
Newsom continued to talk to McGraw about cancel culture, book bans, transgender youth in sports, and life after the television talk show.
20	"And, This is Aaron Parnas (Live on Substack!)"	June 18, 2025
Newsom spoke with journalist Aaron Parnas about Immigrations and Customs Enforcement raids and the June 2025 Los Angeles protests.
21	"And, This is Richard Haass"	June 25, 2025
Newsom spoke with Richard Haass about Iran, the future of the Middle East, and the impacts of Trump's so-called America First foreign policy on the rest of the world.
22	"And, This is Secretary Leon Panetta"	July 1, 2025
Newsom spoke with Leon Panetta on Trump's deploying the military to California, politics and national security, and what Democrats in Congress could be doing to slow down the Trump agenda.
23	"And, This is Dr. Sanjay Gupta"	July 4, 2025
24	"Extended Conversation: How To Live Forever With Dr. Sanjay Gupta"	July 9, 2025
25	"And, This is Pod Save America's Jon Favreau & Tommy Vietor"	July 16, 2025
26	"And, This is Ryan Murphy On The Menendez Brothers, The Kennedys, and Kim Kardashian"	July 21, 2025
27	"More With Ryan Murphy"	July 24, 2025
28	"And, This is How The Left Fails Young Men with Richard Reeves"	July 30, 2025
29	"And, This is Jordan Klepper"	August 6, 2025
30	"And, This Is The Texas Democratic Legislative Delegation"	August 10, 2025
31	"Beto O'Rourke Is Risking Arrest To Protect Texas's Voters"	August 12, 2025
32	"And, This is How We Prevent Election Rigging with Heather Cox Richardson"	August 15, 2025
33	"And, This Is Trump's Attack on Voting Rights With Jasmine Crockett"	August 20, 2025
34	"And, This Is Former DNC Chair Jaime Harrison On Fighting For What's Right"	August 27, 2025
35	"And, This Is Sean Spicer On Why He Thinks People Want To Be On Team Trump This Time Around"	September 3, 2025
36	"And, This Is A Rally For Yes On Proposition 50"	September 18, 2025
37	"And, This Is Gaming Culture & Gen-Z Nihilism With Content Creator Brandon "Atrioc" Ewing"	September 25, 2025
Brandon Ewing aka Atrioc joins the show to talk with Gavin about gaming culture and whether violent video games lead to violent acts. Then they decide what it will take for Gen-Z to reject this administration, if a college degree is worth it, and whether online culture is a cause or symptom of the nihilism young people are feeling.
38	"And, This Is A Department Of Justice Under Attack With Attorney General Eric Holder"	October 3, 2025
39	"And, This is Trump's Invasion With JB Pritzker & Tina Kotek"	October 10, 2025
40	"And, This Is Trump's Shutdown With Senator Chris Murphy"	October 13, 2025
41	"How To Solve The Climate Crisis With President Clinton"	October 23, 2025
42	"And, This Is Flooding The Zone With Truth Ft. Ben Meiselas of MeidasTouch"	October 30, 2025
43	"And, This Is A Final Election Day Push With Aaron Parnas"	November 4, 2025
44	"Has Trump Ruined America's Reputation Around The World? w/ Ian Bremmer"	November 20, 2025
45	"And, This Is Governor Newsom Live At The DealBook Summit With Andrew Ross Sorkin"	December 5, 2025
46	"And, This Is How Trump Loses His Base with Tim Miller of The Bulwark"	December 11, 2025
47	"And, This Is A Look Back At The Biggest Moments of 2025"	December 18, 2025
48	"Re-Release: And, This Is Gaming Culture & Gen-Z Nihilism With Content Creator Brandon "Atrioc" Ewing"	December 30, 2025
Repeat of episode #37.
49	"And, This Is How The Media Is Failing Us In 2026 With Alex Wagner"	January 8, 2026
50	"And, This Is The Chaos Within The GOP Featuring Ben Shapiro"	January 15, 2026
51	"And, This Is The Conversation The Trump Administration Tried To Cancel (Live From Davos!)"	January 22, 2026
52	"And, This Is A Country In Crisis With Keith Edwards"	January 29, 2026
53	"And, This Is What The Founding Fathers Were Worried About With Jon Meacham"	February 12, 2026
54	"And This Is Where MAGA Got Their Playbook With Congressman Jim Clyburn"	February 18, 2026
55	"And, This Is How We Were Really Raised with Gavin's Sister Hilary"	March 13, 2026
56	"And, This Is The End Of The Free Press With Don Lemon"	March 20, 2026
57	"And, This Is How To Preserve Our Democracy With Filmmaker Ken Burns"	April 2, 2026
58	"The Briefing: "Get Me Regime Change In Iran""	April 9, 2026
59	"And, This Is The Stoic's Survival Guide With Ryan Holiday"	April 16, 2026
60	"And, This Is The Man Who Survived The Manosphere - Louis Theroux"	April 23, 2026
61	"The Briefing: They Were Always Coming For Your Right To Vote With Attorney General Eric Holder"	April 30, 2026
62	"Can Artificial Intelligence Be Controlled? With Tristan Harris & Aza Raskin"	May 14, 2026
63	"And, This Is Who Wins In An AI World With Andrew Yang"	May 27, 2026
64	"And, This Is Former MAGA Influencer Ashley St. Clair"	June 4, 2026
65	"And, This Is Hunter Biden Like You've Never Heard Him Before"	June 11, 2026
66	"And, This Is Why Reid Hoffman Doesn’t Fear Artificial Intelligence"	June 18, 2026
67	"And, This Is How Democrats Lead Us To A Post Trump World With Brian Tyler Cohen"	June 25, 2026
68	"And, This Is How To Celebrate America 250 With Ken Burns"	July 3, 2026
69	"And, This Is What To Make Of A Life With Author Jim Collins"	July 9, 2026
70	"And, This Is An Insider’s Guide To How Trump Sees His Presidency With Chris Christie"	July 16, 2026
71	"And, This Is How Social Media Will Decide the Next Election With David Pakman"	July 23, 2026
72	"And, This Is The January 6th Officer Who Won’t Back Down Against MAGA - Michael Fanone"	August 9, 2026
73	"And, This Is What Democrats Can Learn From Michigan With Governor Gretchen Whitmer"	August 16, 2026
74	"How Crypto Targets Young Men With Ben Mckenzie"	August 25, 2026
75	"And, This is A Fight To Protect Our Rights With Montgomery Mayor Steven Reed"	September 6, 2026
76	"And, This Is An Urgent Message on Artificial Intelligence"	September 18, 2026
77	"And, This Is Newsmax’s Chris Ruddy on The FCC & The Future of Conservative Media"	September 24, 2026
78	"And, This Is How We Rectify Our Racial Legacy With Bryan Stevenson"	October 1, 2026
79	"And, This Is Bestselling Author Michael Lewis On Elon Musk, DOGE and His Newest Book “Blockers”"	October 7, 2026
80	"And, This Is How To Build A Better Media Business With Axios’s Jim VandeHei"	October 15, 2026
81	"And, This is The World's Most Powerful Man With Musk Director Alex Gibney"	October 23, 2026
82	"And, This Is The Woman To Lead New Mexico With Deb Haaland"	October 29, 2026
83	"And, This Is An Insider's Guide To The Midterms with Strategist Mike Murphy"	November 2, 2026
84	"And, This Is What Happens When The Democrats Take Power With Timothy Snyder"	November 12, 2026

== Reception ==
Vulture describes Newsom's podcast "as the governor's more direct effort at political outreach across the aisle." It has received exposure due to its exploration of differing political viewpoints. The New Yorker suggests that he needs his podcast to distance himself from the progressive wing of the Democratic Party. California state Senator Ben Allen valued Newsom's goal of emphasizing these viewpoints by noting the importance of open dialogue. Kentucky Governor Andy Beshear publicly supported Newsom's podcast, but criticized his choice to interview Steve Bannon as his guest. The left wing blog Daily Kos said that his status as a Democrat could be a significant influence in the realm of podcasting, which is dominated by right-wing voices.

Newsom garnered publicity for his rhetoric on the first episode ("And, This is Charlie Kirk"); he shared his opposition to the term Latinx, suggested his opposition to gender transition surgeries for inmates and said that it was "deeply unfair" for transgender women to participate in women's sports. Newsom originally said to Kirk about this issue: "I think it's an issue of fairness; I completely agree with you on that. It is an issue of fairness, it's deeply unfair." MSNBC said that "the governor's comments [were] a departure from his relatively progressive record on LGBTQ rights," due to his influence on LGBTQ rights in the United States.

Newsom was criticized by some Democrats for his willingness to converse with conservatives; he said that his podcast explores how the Republican Party's messaging in the 2024 election win voters. Some people believe his podcast plays him more politically moderate, with ongoing speculation he is preparing himself as a potential Democratic candidate for president in the 2028 election, in which Newsom will possibly run for president after leaving office as California governor at the end of his term in January 2027. As of April 2, 2025, This Is Gavin Newsom is ranked as the 40th most popular podcast on Spotify and ranked as 53rd on iHeart's "Podcasts Top 100" list.

== See also ==
- The Gavin Newsom Show (2012–2013)
