= Savage in Limbo =

1984 play by John Patrick Shanley

- Written by: John Patrick Shanley
- Original language: English
- Genre: Drama

Premiere
- Date premiered: 1984

Savage In Limbo is a 1984 play by American playwright John Patrick Shanley. The play follows the tragicomic lives of a group of losers who frequent a seedy Bronx bar.

== Plot overview ==
Classmates from parochial school get together at a local, shabby bar in the Bronx. The bartender and owner, Murk, compulsively waters his plants, although they are dead. They have empty lives but they talk about changing for the better. Tony and Linda (who have two children although unwed) question their relationship. "All of them are 32 years old and they can hear the clock ticking with little to show for their dead end lives of not-so-quiet desperation."

== Productions ==
Savage In Limbo was first produced at the Eugene O'Neill Memorial Theatre Centre in a staged reading in 1984. The play premiered in New York City in a production by the Double Image Theatre in September 1985, called a "concert play". Directed by Mark Linn-Baker, the cast included Randle Mell and Jayne Haynes.

Savage In Limbo was reviewed by the New York Daily News who said, "Conceived with sharp insight into the lives of losers, conveyed with a friskly and often hilarious wit…" The reviewer of a 2011 production at MetroStage, Washington, DC wrote: "Once in a while all of the stars align to create a magical theatre event like MetroStage’s production of John Patrick Shanley’s 'Savage in Limbo'. The script, the cast, the direction, the performances, and the venue are all so perfectly in tune that the production inspires nothing but praise."

The play ran at The Drilling Company Theatre, New York City, in 2011. Its British premiere production was at the Gate Theatre, London, in 1987.

In May 2022, an Off-Off-Broadway revival was mounted at the Producers Club in New York City.
