= CNN NewsStand =

CNN NewsStand is a project to create CNN programming associated with publications owned by Time Warner, shortly after CNN owner Turner Broadcasting System had been bought by Time Warner. The second "S" in "NewsStand" was not capitalized consistently even within Time Warner. In its original concept, NewsStand would feature an in-depth program each weeknight, assuming a report was available, branded as combining CNN with a Time Warner magazine.

The CNN Newsstand name has been used since 2008 for airport retail stores run by Hudson Group.

== CNN & Time ==
The first and best-known NewsStand combination was titled CNN & Time, or sometimes NewsStand: CNN & Time. It was heavily promoted in advance as a joint project between CNN and Time magazine and the first major example of "synergy" in the Time-Warner merger.

The NewsStand series' debut episode, broadcast on 1998-06-07, was a CNN & Time presentation, "Valley of Death", a highly controversial report that accused the United States military of using sarin gas in Operation Tailwind during the Vietnam War. After almost a month of further investigations, CNN declared that it has insufficient evidence to run the story, and both CNN and Time were forced to retract the story in full on 1998-07-02. CNN's retraction further stated that "CNN alone bears responsibility for both the television reports and for the printed article in the June 15 issue of Time magazine."

The series continued for a few years under various names, such as CNN Impact, trying to shake its reputation from the first episode.

== Other NewsStands ==
CNN briefly ran other types of NewsStand programs, including CNN & Fortune and CNN & Entertainment Weekly. Another example of CNN-Time Warner synergy was People in the News, a TV show billed as being with People magazine.

== See also ==
- Operation Tailwind § Controversy — larger section about "Valley of Death" and its consequences
- People in the News
