= Jonathan Allen (journalist) =

American political journalist (born 1975)

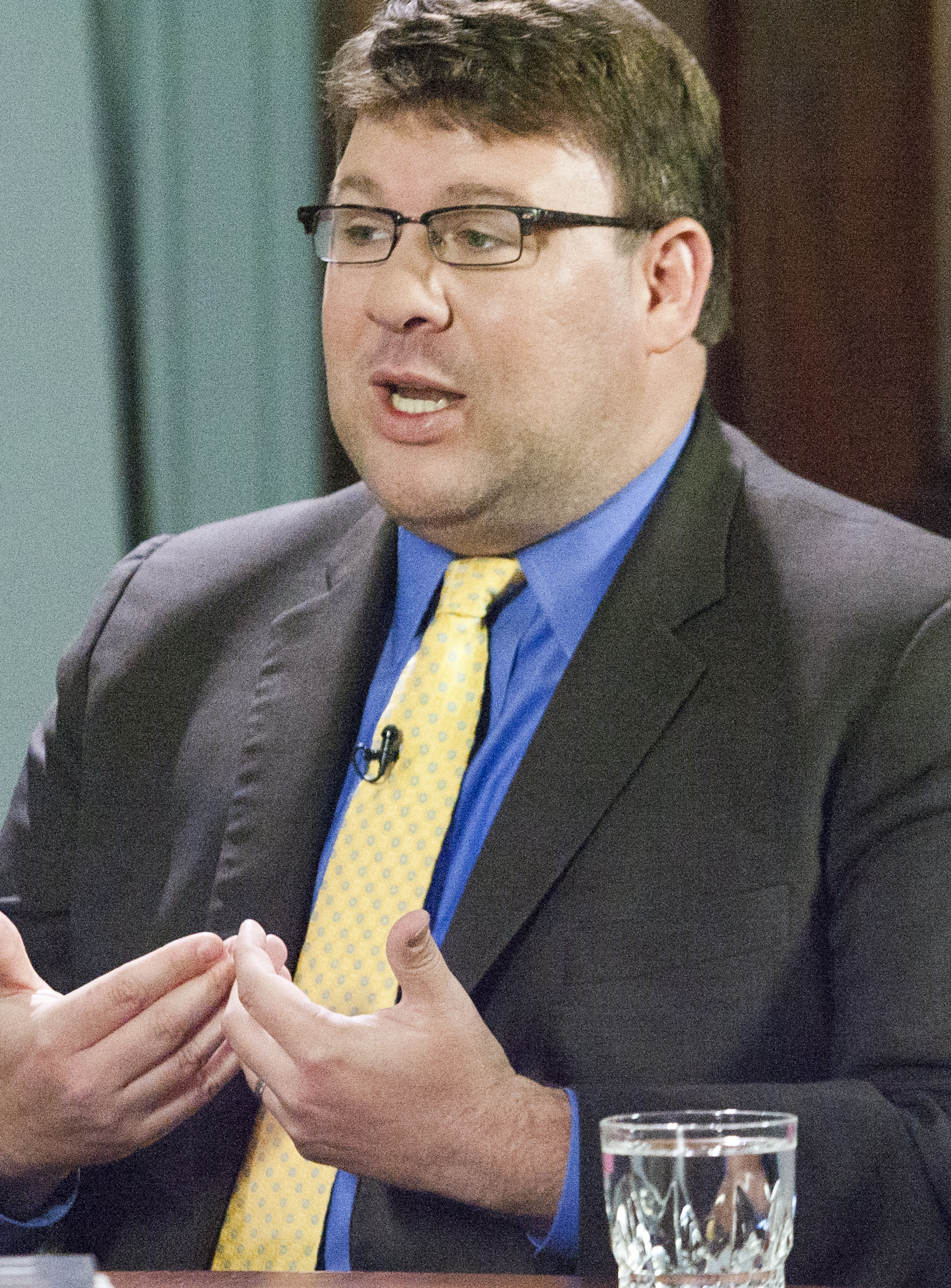
- Allen during a 2014 Q&A with the Miller Center
- Born: October 15, 1975 (age 50); Bethesda, Maryland, U.S.
- Education: University of Maryland (BA)
- Occupation: Political journalist
- Years active: 2000–present
- Employer: NBC News
- Notable work: HRC: State Secrets and the Rebirth of Hillary Clinton (2014); Shattered: Inside Hillary Clinton's Doomed Campaign (2017)
- Political party: Democratic
- Spouse: Stephanie Claire Allen (m. 2005)
- Children: 2
- Awards: Everett McKinley Dirksen Award for Distinguished Reporting of Congress (2008); Sandy Hume Memorial Award for Excellence in Political Journalism (2008)

Jonathan Allen (born October 15, 1975) is an American political journalist and analyst. He has been a senior political analyst and political reporter for NBC News Digital since 2017. Allen has also reported for Congressional Quarterly, The Hill, Politico, Bloomberg News, and Vox. Allen's partnership with fellow political correspondent Amie Parnes resulted in two best-selling books on Hillary Clinton. In 2008, he won the Everett Dirksen Award and Sandy Hume Award.

Allen has appeared as a commentator on political talk shows such as Hardball with Chris Matthews and Meet the Press. He has served as a political operative for the Democratic Party and as head of community and content for Sidewire from January 2016 to the service's closure in June 2017. Allen has also taught as an adjunct professor at Northwestern University.

== Early life and education ==
Jonathan Allen was born in Bethesda, Maryland, on October 15, 1975, to Marin and Ira R. Allen, a reporter for United Press International. He is the first of two children, preceding his sister Amanda. Allen was educated at Walter Johnson High School, his mother's alma mater, in his hometown of Bethesda.

Allen became interested in journalism as a child due to his parents discussing political news with him and his sister. His first foray into journalism was in high school, where he wrote for the school newspaper as a sports reporter. During a talk with students at Duke University, Allen recollected:

When I was 14, my father told me I should get a job. So I took a sports reporter position covering high school football games, which I would have gone to anyway. They didn't care about my writing. They should have, but they didn't. They were just hoping I'd get the score right.

Outside of sports reporting, Allen was the captain of the school's It's Academic team, participated in school plays, and was the pitcher for the school's baseball team. He again wrote as a sports reporter for The Gazette, a local newspaper.

In the mid-1990s, Allen attended St. Mary's College of Maryland, where he played as a pitcher on the baseball team and worked as a sports reporter for the university's Point News. Allen transferred to the University of Maryland and joined the staff of The Diamondback, the student newspaper. He graduated from the University of Maryland in 1998 with a Bachelor of Arts in Government and Politics.

== Career ==
=== Congressional Quarterly and The Hill ===
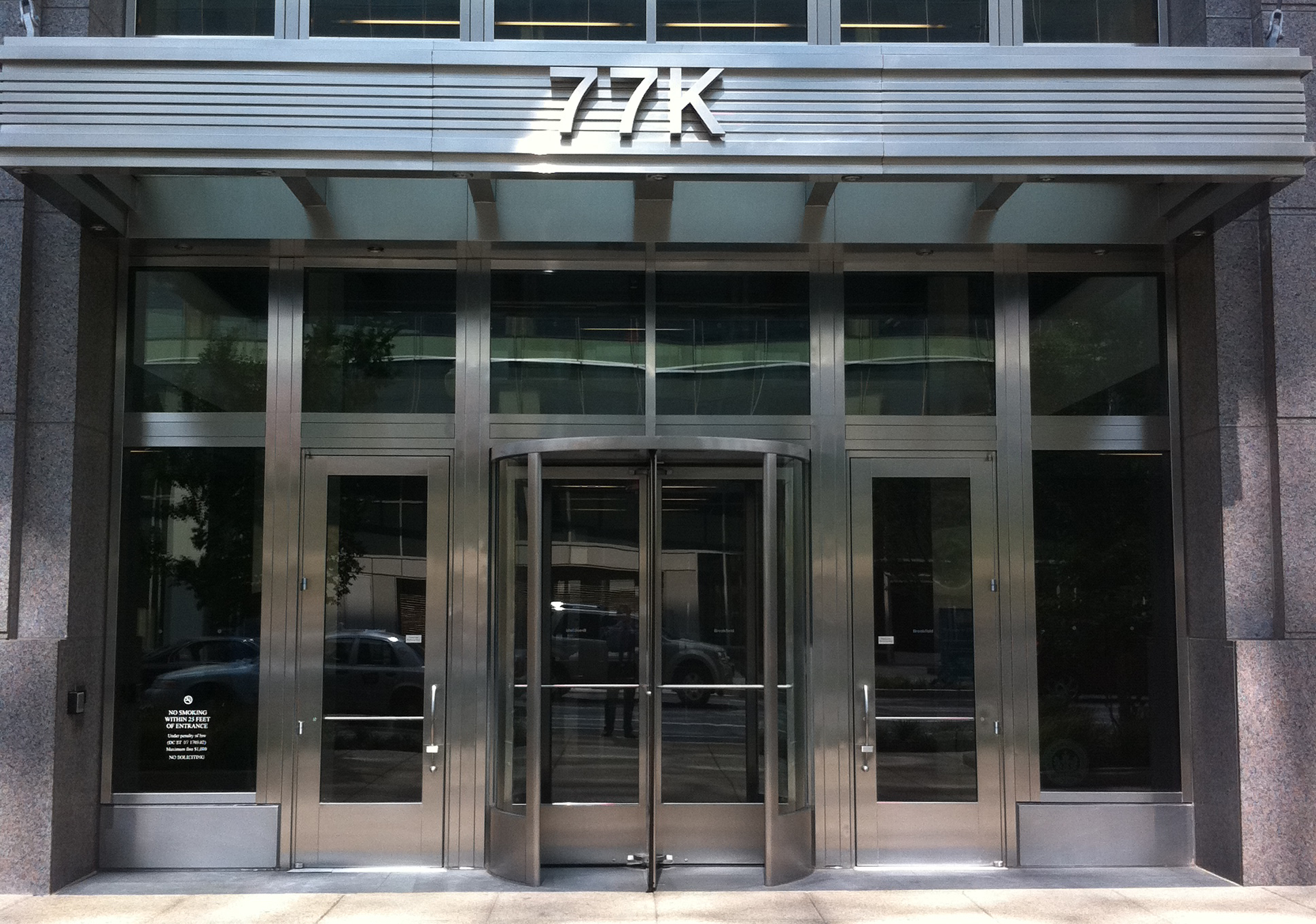
Allen's work at Congressional Quarterly (now CQ Roll Call, headquarters pictured) earned him the Everett Dirksen Award and Sandy Hume Award in 2008.

After graduating from college, Allen briefly worked at the local Prince William Journal before joining Congressional Quarterly in 2000 as a copy editor. Desperate for work, he volunteered on the weekends to work on smaller stories. Allen would eventually work his way up within the company, serving as a congressional reporter as early as 2002. In the fall of 2005, Allen left Congressional Quarterly for The Hill to work as a U.S. Senate reporter. He returned to Congressional Quarterly a year later.

=== Politico and politics ===
Congressional Quarterly was acquired by The Economist Group and combined with Roll Call in 2009, forming CQ Roll Call. As a result of the merger, Allen and 43 other employees from both publications were laid off. Politico then hired him on a fixed-term contract.

Allen declined to extend his stint at Politico, instead leaving journalism in favor of political work. After working for Maryland Senator Paul Sarbanes, Allen was quickly hired by Representative Debbie Wasserman Schultz as executive director of Democrats Win Seats, a political action committee. Allen stated that "[Wasserman Shultz] wanted me to come work for her, and it was impossible for me to say no. She has a heart of gold and resolve of steel ... I find that inspiring." After only 40 days into this job however, Allen felt that he was not cut out for politics, later declaring that "I'm contrarian. I'm a curmudgeon. Journalism is my calling." Allen rejoined Politico in February 2010, eventually being promoted to White House bureau chief.

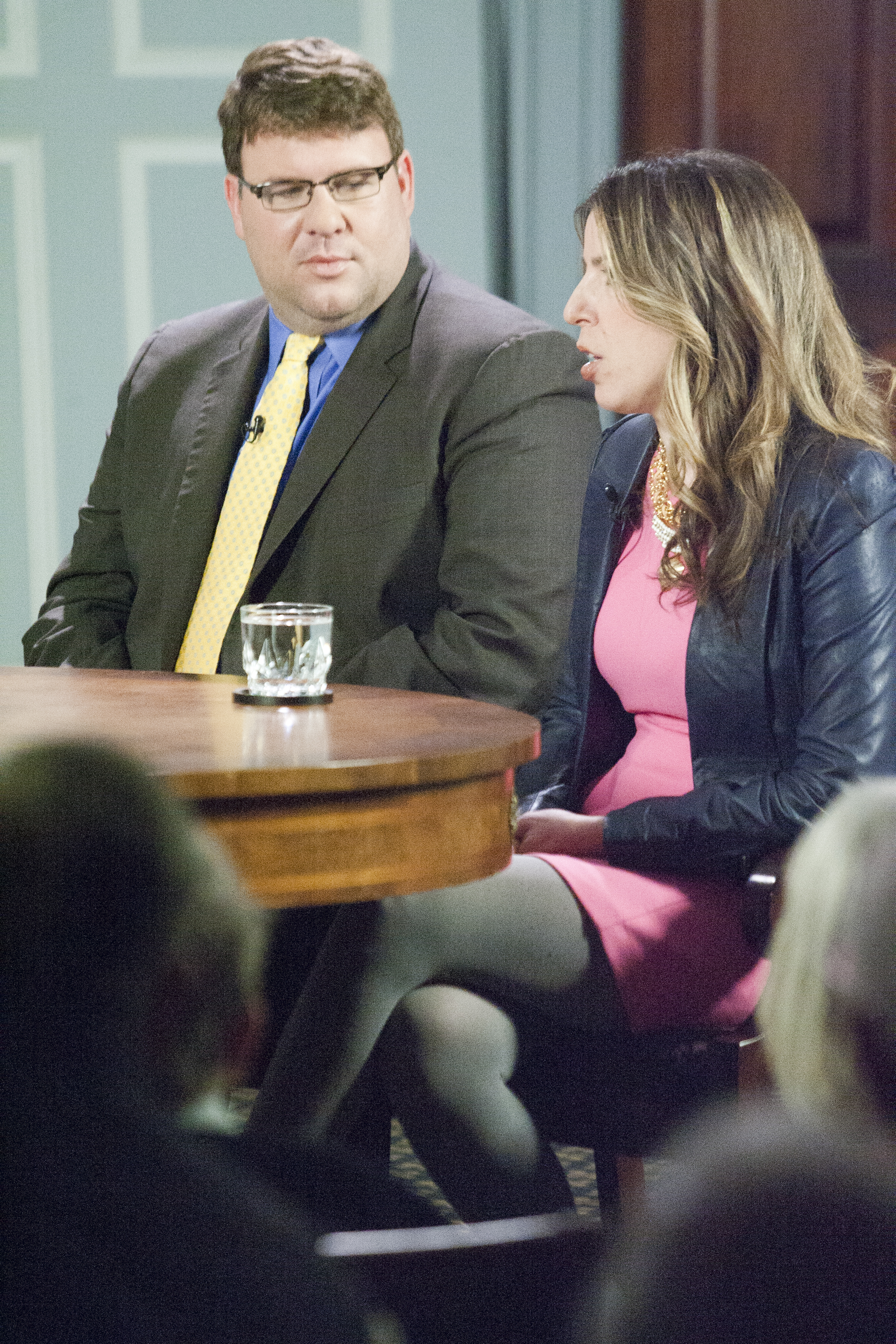
Jonathan Allen and Amie Parnes in 2014. Allen described Parnes as having "tremendous talent and drive".

=== HRC, Bloomberg News, and Vox ===
In 2012, Allen partnered with journalist Amie Parnes of The Hill to write a book on then U.S. Secretary of State Hillary Clinton that focused on her tenure and political future. The pair spoke to more than 200 sources and gained deep access into Clinton's inner circle. These sources included advisers, aides of Clinton's 2008 presidential campaign, and Clinton herself.

HRC: State Secrets and the Rebirth of Hillary Clinton was published on February 11, 2014. Though the book was a New York Times Best Seller, it was negatively received by critics, who felt the authors had portrayed Clinton too sympathetically. Jodi Kantor of The New York Times accused Clinton's senior adviser Philippe Reines of meddling, commenting that "You can almost hear Philippe Reines, Clinton’s crafty public relations aide, parceling out anecdotes."

A widely publicized finding from Allen and Parnes' reporting was an enemies list compiled by Clinton's campaign staff in 2008. The list bifurcated Democratic politicians who had stayed close with Clinton and those who endorsed Barack Obama. Individuals on the list were rated from a scale of 1 to 7, with 7 being reserved for those perceived to be the most ungrateful for Clinton's past support. Democratic congresspeople rated a 7 included Claire McCaskill, John Kerry, and Jason Altmire.

Allen left Politico for Bloomberg News in 2014. Initially hired to cover the White House and Hillary Clinton's anticipated 2016 presidential campaign, he was eventually promoted to Washington bureau chief. Allen would leave Bloomberg News for Vox in April 2015, reportedly due to the launch of Bloomberg Politics and its effect on the agency's political reporting. Allen served as chief political correspondent for Vox until October 2015, leaving to focus on a follow-up book on Hillary Clinton.

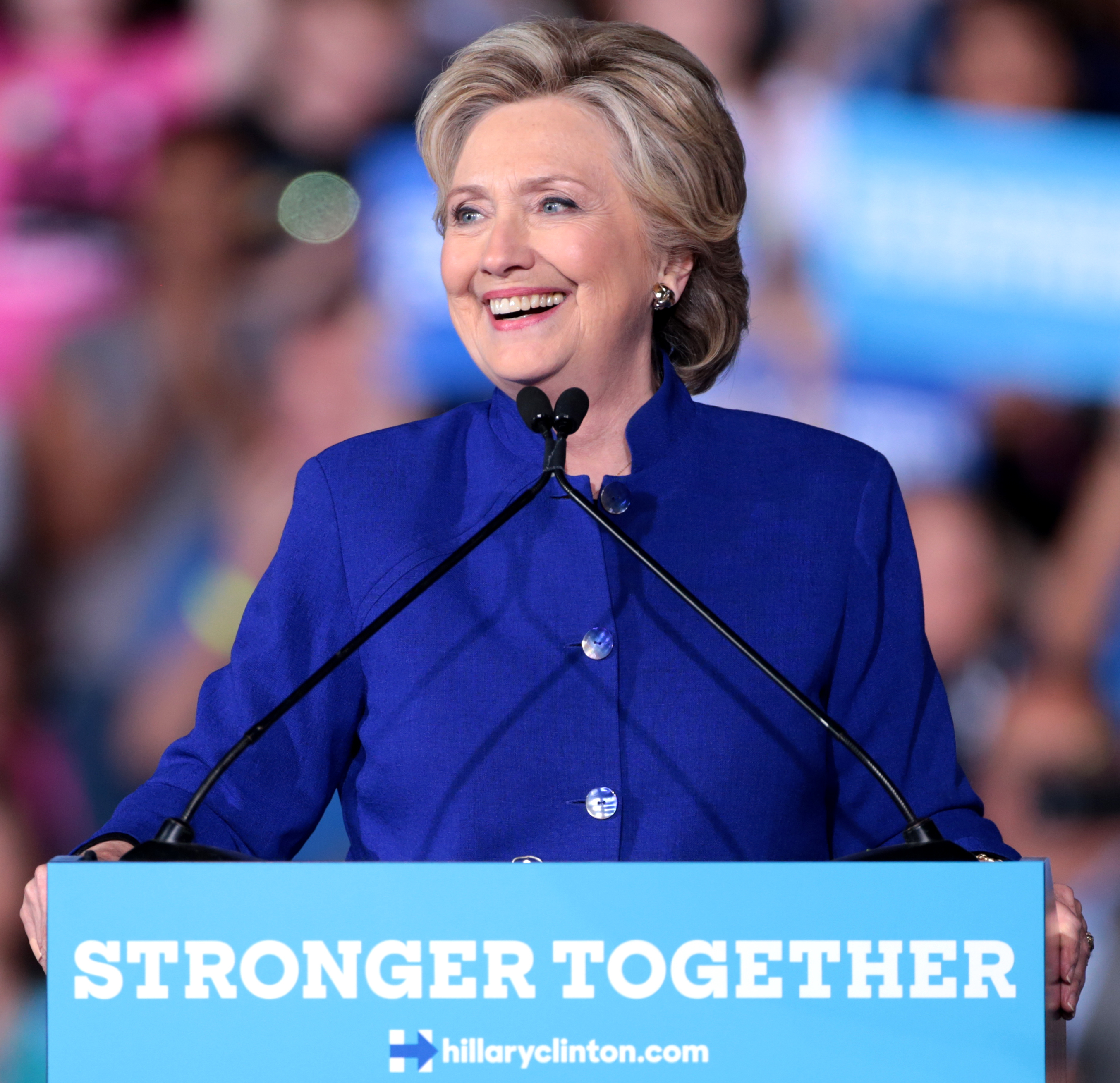
Allen and Parnes closely followed Clinton during her 2016 campaign and were given unprecedented access to Clinton's inner circle.

=== Shattered ===
In April 2014, Crown Publishing Group announced that Allen and Parnes would collaborate on a book centered on Clinton's anticipated 2016 presidential campaign. Both journalists inspected Clinton's campaign and interviewed her campaign staff for a year and a half. In the fallout of Donald Trump's upset victory in 2016, the book turned into a post-mortem examination of the Clinton campaign. In a 2017 interview with Charlie Rose, Allen stated that:

...we had this discussion before the election as we were talking to our editor about the fact that we had identified a lot of problems even though it looked like she was going to win.

Shattered: Inside Hillary Clinton's Doomed Campaign was published on April 18, 2017. The book debuted at #1 on The New York Times Best Seller list for its combined print and digital book editions, and would remain on the list for eight weeks. The book received positive reviews from critics such as Michiko Kakutani of The New York Times and David Shribman of The Globe and Mail. Clinton's former campaign staff have denied Allen and Parnes' assertions that the Clinton campaign was marred by internal tensions and disputes, and provided photos of happy moments during the campaign. Christa Reynolds, the Clinton campaign's deputy communications director, refuted the book's claims in a blog post. Parnes responded to Reynolds by affirming that they "[stood] by our reporting," and that the photos posted by campaign staffers were not inconsistent with the book's depiction of the campaign.

In 2017, it was reported that TriStar Television had optioned the book for a limited series. However, no further developments have been announced since this.

=== Sidewire, NBC News, Lucky and Fight ===
After leaving Vox in October 2015, Allen served as head of community content for Sidewire, a political news analysis platform. According to Allen, he saw potential in Sidewire following a post by Senator Lindsey Graham, who used the platform to discuss the presidential debate he had been excluded from. Allen would remain in this position until the platform's closure in June 2017. During this time, he rejoined CQ Roll Call as a columnist. Allen then left CQ Roll Call for NBC News in 2017, where he has worked ever since.

Allen and Parnes regrouped to write a book on Joe Biden's 2020 presidential campaign, Lucky: How Joe Biden Barely Won the Presidency. Lucky was published on March 2, 2021. The two authors describe conflicting ideas among Biden's campaign staff about political strategy, rhetoric, and policy. The book covers the campaign's relationships with Biden's former colleagues such as Barack Obama and Hillary Clinton, the campaign's response to matters such as the COVID-19 pandemic and racial unrest, and how Biden won based on an unlikely set of circumstances. The book received mixed reviews from critics, who commended the book for being a valuable historical resource but concluded that it ultimately provided no new insights or ideas. Carlos Lozada of The Washington Post wrote that the book "provides useful detail to understand Biden's victory, even if the framing is not particularly novel." According to Jennifer Szalai of The New York Times, "the granular politicking ably recounted in Lucky is a necessity—but what becomes unintentionally clear is how wasteful so much of it is."

In January 2022, American publishing company William Morrow and Company bought the publishing rights to Allen and Parnes' dual biography of Hillary Clinton and her husband, former U.S. President Bill Clinton. The biography, titled Clinton, follows the pair from the 1960s to Trump's defeat in the 2020 presidential election.

Allen and Parnes authored a book about the 2024 presidential election, Fight: Inside the Wildest Battle for the White House. It details Joe Biden's 2024 reelection campaign, withdrawal from the election, and replacement with Kamala Harris as the Democratic nominee. It was published on April 1, 2025 and debuted at #1 on The New York Times Best Seller list for its combined print and digital book editions.

== Personal life ==
In 2005, Allen married his partner Stephanie; the couple had first met at Congressional Quarterly, where Stephanie worked as a researcher. They have had two children together. Allen has taught courses on presidential politics and journalism at Northwestern University. He currently resides in Washington, D.C.

Allen is a supporter of the Democratic Party, having previously worked under Democratic politicians Paul Sarbanes and Debbie Wasserman Schultz. He also financially contributed to the failed 2010 reelection campaign of senator Blanche Lincoln. Alongside his own time as a political operative, Allen's wife Stephanie served as communications director for Democratic senators Mary Landrieu and Kay Hagan.

== Awards and accolades ==
In 2007, Allen published "Manifest Disparity" for Congressional Quarterly, a series of stories focusing on the racial disparities and political considerations behind congressional earmarking. According to Allen's own testimony, he built a database of members of congress, their projects, and the price of each project. The database was composed of publicly released data from the House of Representatives and from watchdog group Taxpayers for Common Sense. These findings won Allen the National Press Club's Sandy Hume Award and the National Press Foundation's Everett Dirksen Award in June and December 2008 respectively.

== Works ==
- HRC: State Secrets and the Rebirth of Hillary Clinton (2014) Crown Publishing Group; ISBN 978-0804136778 written with Amie Parnes
- Shattered: Inside Hillary Clinton's Doomed Campaign (2017) Crown Publishing Group; ISBN 978-0-553-44708-8 written with Amie Parnes
- Lucky: How Joe Biden Barely Won the Presidency (2021) Crown Publishing Group; ISBN 978-0-525-57422-4 written with Amie Parnes
- Fight: Inside the Wildest Battle for the White House. William Morrow and Company. April 2025. ISBN 978-0063438644. written with Amie Parnes
