= Judge Forrest =

Judge Forrest may refer to:

- Danielle J. Forrest (born 1977), judge of the United States Court of Appeals for the Ninth Circuit
- Katherine B. Forrest (born 1964), judge of the United States District Court for the Southern District of New York
