= Amie Parnes =

American political journalist (born 1978)

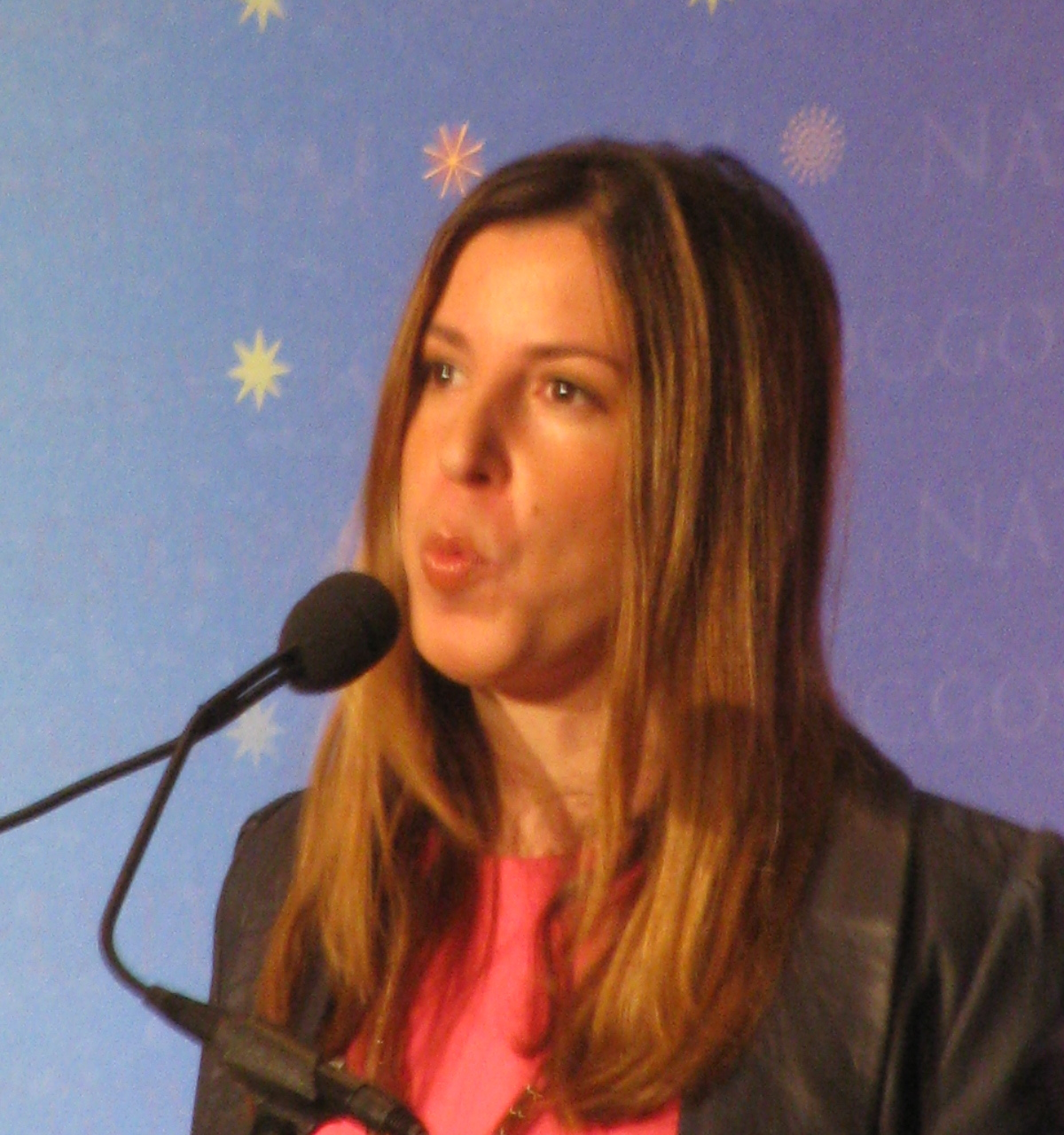
- Parnes speaking at the 2014 National Book Festival
- Born: April 15, 1978 (age 48); Miami, Florida, US
- Years active: 2000–present
- Employer: The Hill
- Notable work: HRC: State Secrets and the Rebirth of Hillary Clinton; Shattered: Inside Hillary Clinton's Doomed Campaign
- Children: 1

Amie Parnes (born April 15, 1978) is an American political journalist. She has been a senior correspondent for The Hill since 2024, having previously worked there from 2011 to 2023. She was the chief White House correspondent for The Messenger from the site's launch in May 2023 to its closure in January 2024. Parnes has also reported for CNN and Politico. Parnes' partnership with fellow political correspondent Jonathan Allen resulted in two best-selling books on Hillary Clinton.

== Life and career ==
Amie Parnes was born on April 15, 1978. She grew up in Miami and has a sister. Parnes is a single parent, having given birth to a son in 2015. She first became interested in political journalism while working as an intern for The New York Times in 2000, with her first major news story being the 2000 United States presidential election recount in Florida. After this internship, Parnes reported under The Philadelphia Inquirer and E.W. Scripps Company's news service.

Parnes began reporting for Politico in December 2007 as a staff writer. While working for Politico, Parnes extensively covered the 2008 presidential election and the Obama administration.

=== The Hill and other news outlets ===
In November 2011, Parnes left Politico, signing onto The Hill as a White House reporter. During her time at The Hill, Parnes occasionally served as a non-partisan analyst for outlets such as CNN, MSNBC, and ABC News.

==== HRC ====
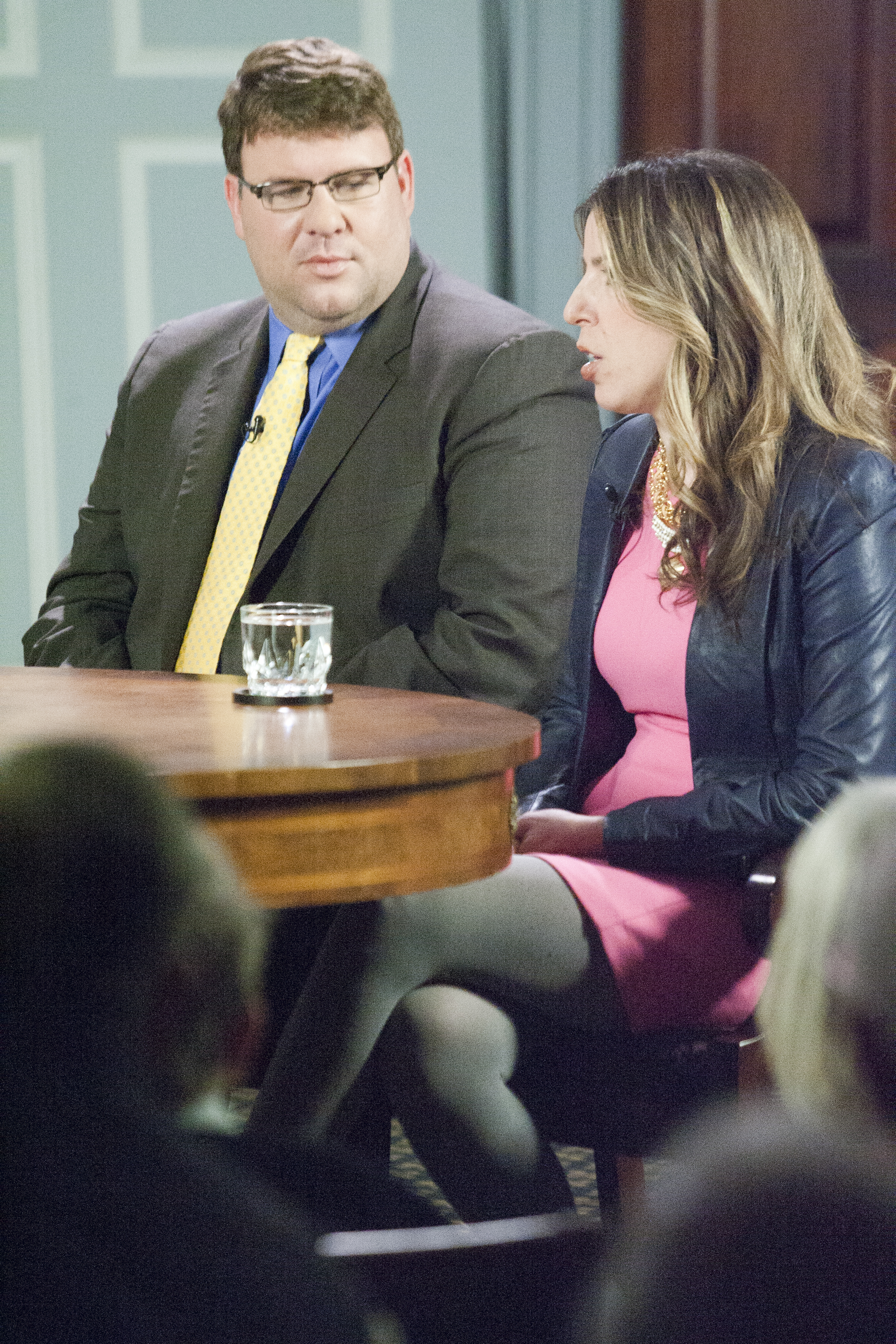
Jonathan Allen and Amie Parnes in 2014. Allen described Parnes as having "tremendous talent and drive".

In 2012, Parnes partnered with journalist Jonathan Allen of Politico to write a book on then U.S. Secretary of State Hillary Clinton that focused on her tenure and political future. The pair spoke to more than 200 sources and gained deep access into Clinton's inner circle. These sources included advisers, aides of Clinton's 2008 presidential campaign, and Clinton herself.

HRC: State Secrets and the Rebirth of Hillary Clinton was published on February 11, 2014. Though the book was a New York Times Best Seller, it was negatively received by critics, who felt the authors had portrayed Clinton too sympathetically. Jodi Kantor of The New York Times accused Clinton's senior adviser Philippe Reines of meddling, commenting that "You can almost hear Philippe Reines, Clinton's crafty public relations aide, parceling out anecdotes."

A widely publicized finding from Allen and Parnes' reporting was an enemies list compiled by Clinton's campaign staff in 2008. The list bifurcated Democratic politicians who had stayed close with Clinton and those who endorsed Barack Obama. Individuals on the list were rated from a scale of 1 to 7, with 7 being reserved for those perceived to be the most ungrateful for Clinton's past support. Democratic congresspeople rated a 7 included Claire McCaskill, John Kerry, and Jason Altmire.

==== Shattered ====
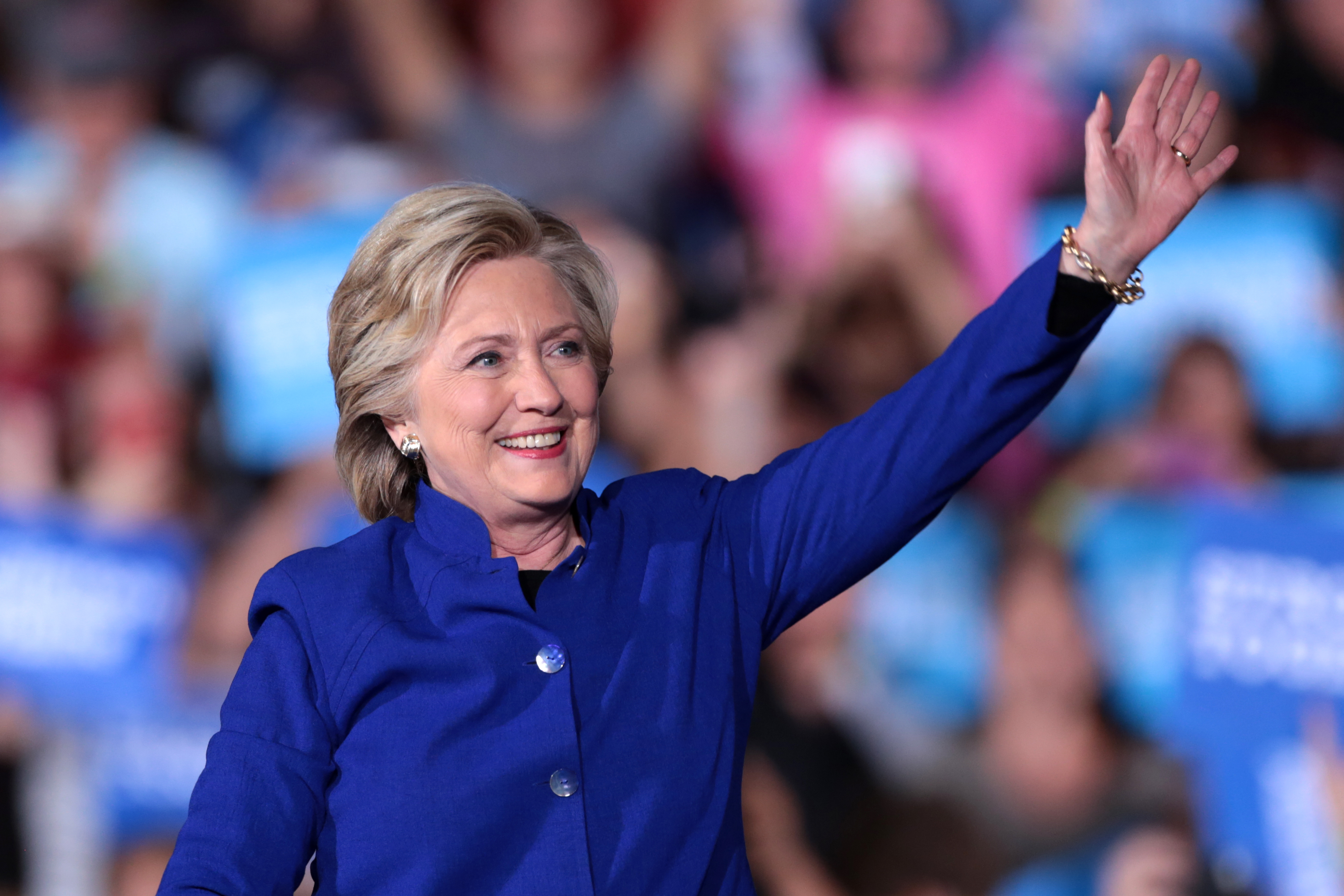
Allen and Parnes closely followed Clinton during her 2016 campaign and were given unprecedented access to Clinton's inner circle.

In April 2014, Crown Publishing Group officially announced that Allen and Parnes would collaborate on a book centered on Clinton's anticipated 2016 presidential campaign. Both journalists inspected Clinton's campaign and interviewed her campaign staff for a year and a half. In the fallout of Donald Trump's upset victory in 2016, the book turned into a post-mortem examination of the Clinton campaign.

Shattered: Inside Hillary Clinton's Doomed Campaign was published on April 18, 2017. The book debuted at number one on The New York Times Best Seller list for its combined print and digital book editions, and would remain on the list for eight weeks. The book received positive reviews from critics such as Michiko Kakutani of The New York Times and David Shribman of The Globe and Mail. Clinton campaign staff have denied Allen and Parnes' assertions that the Clinton campaign was marred by internal tensions and disputes, and provided photos of happy moments during the campaign. Christa Reynolds, the Clinton campaign's deputy communications director, refuted the book's claims in a blog post. Parnes responded to Reynolds by affirming that they "[stood] by our reporting," and that the photos posted by campaign staffers were not inconsistent with the book's depiction of the campaign.

In 2017, it was reported that TriStar Television had optioned the book for a limited series.

==== Lucky, Clinton and Fight ====
Parnes and Allen regrouped to draft a book on Joe Biden. Lucky: How Joe Biden Barely Won the Presidency was published on March 2, 2021. The two authors describe conflicting ideas among Biden's campaign staff about political strategy, rhetoric, and policy. The book covers the campaign's relationships with Biden's former colleagues such as Barack Obama and Hillary Clinton, the campaign's response to matters such as the COVID-19 pandemic and racial unrest, and how Biden won based on an unlikely set of circumstances. The book received mixed reviews from critics, who commended the book for being a valuable historical resource but concluded that it ultimately provided no new insights or ideas. Carlos Lozada of The Washington Post wrote that the book "provides useful detail to understand Biden's victory, even if the framing is not particularly novel." According to Jennifer Szalai of The New York Times, "the granular politicking ably recounted in Lucky is a necessity—but what becomes unintentionally clear is how wasteful so much of it is."

In January 2022, American publishing company William Morrow and Company bought the publishing rights to Parnes and Allen's dual biography of Hillary Clinton and her husband, former U.S. President Bill Clinton. The biography, titled Clinton, follows the pair from the 1960s to Trump's defeat in the 2020 presidential election.

Parnes and Allen authored a book about the 2024 presidential election, Fight: Inside the Wildest Battle for the White House. It details Joe Biden's 2024 reelection campaign, withdrawal from the election, and replacement with Kamala Harris as the Democratic nominee. It was published on April 1, 2025 and debuted at #1 on The New York Times Best Seller list for its combined print and digital book editions.

=== The Messenger and return to The Hill ===
After The Hill was sold to Nexstar Media Group in 2021, former owner of The Hill Jimmy Finkelstein founded The Messenger, a news website. According to Parnes, Finkelstein contacted her personally to join as the website's chief White House correspondent in April 2023. After repeated requests and promises of a raise and four months of severance pay, Parnes left The Hill and began reporting for The Messenger once the site launched in May 2023. Amid reporting of the site's financial difficulties and layoffs, Parnes alleges that Finkelstein assured her and other staff that the site remained successful, floating the possibility of a TV news channel. Finkelstein was also accused of abruptly closing the site without notifying employees, with Parnes and other staff finding out about the site's closure through The New York Times. A class action lawsuit filed on behalf of Parnes and other staff members was put forth in the United States District Court for the Southern District of New York in February 2024, prosecuting The Messenger for potentially violating the WARN Act. The lawsuit demands 60 days in unpaid wages, health and life insurance, accrued vacation time, and other employee benefits. Finkelstein later told Axios that he was considering how to help former employees and reopen the site. The lawsuit was at least the fourth filed in relation to Finkelsein's failure to provide severance pay.

In March 2024, Parnes returned to The Hill as a senior correspondent. In 2024, Parnes began hosting On the QT with Amie Parnes with 2WAY, a live news platform.

== Joe Biden photo controversy ==
In 2013, a photo taken of then Vice President Joe Biden embracing Parnes during a holiday party at Number One Observatory Circle went viral. Conservative outlets such as The Daily Caller accused Biden of groping Parnes. Anchors Matt Lauer, Natalie Morales, Savannah Guthrie, and Tamron Hall of Today all defended Biden on air, arguing that the photo showed nothing inappropriate.

After Biden's 2020 presidential campaign launched, altered versions of the photograph have periodically surfaced online. Reuters has reported on two separate edits of the photo that both circulated on Facebook, the latter of which replaced Parnes' likeness with that of then White House Press Secretary Jen Psaki.

== Works ==
- HRC: State Secrets and the Rebirth of Hillary Clinton (2014) Crown Publishing Group; ISBN 978-0804136778 written with Jonathan Allen
- Shattered: Inside Hillary Clinton's Doomed Campaign (2017) Crown Publishing Group; ISBN 978-0-553-44708-8 written with Jonathan Allen
- Lucky: How Joe Biden Barely Won the Presidency (2021) Crown Publishing Group; ISBN 978-0-525-57422-4 written with Jonathan Allen
- Fight: Inside the Wildest Battle for the White House (2025) William Morrow and Company ISBN 978-0063438644 written with Jonathan Allen
