= Diarmuid O'Scannlain =

American judge (born 1937)

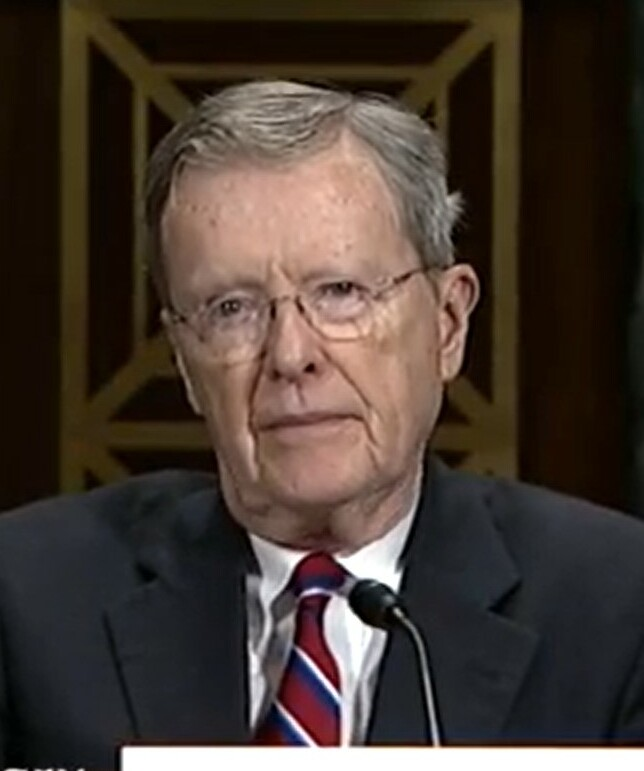
- O'Scannlain in 2018

Senior Judge of the United States Court of Appeals for the Ninth Circuit
- Incumbent
- Assumed office December 31, 2016

Judge of the United States Court of Appeals for the Ninth Circuit
- In office September 26, 1986 – December 31, 2016
- Appointed by: Ronald Reagan
- Preceded by: Robert Boochever
- Succeeded by: Danielle J. Forrest

Personal details
- Born: Diarmuid Fionntain O'Scannlain; 1937 (age 88–89) New York City, New York, U.S.
- Party: Republican
- Spouse: Maura Nolan
- Children: 8, including Kate
- Education: St. John's University (BA); Harvard University (JD); University of Virginia (LLM)

Diarmuid Fionntain O'Scannlain (/ˈdɪərmɪd oʊˈskænlən/ DEER-mid oh-SKAN-lən; born in 1937) is a senior United States circuit judge of the United States Court of Appeals for the Ninth Circuit. His chambers are located in Portland, Oregon.

== Early life and career ==
Born in New York City, New York, O'Scannlain received a Bachelor of Arts degree from St. John's University in 1957, a Juris Doctor from Harvard Law School in 1963, and a Master of Laws from the University of Virginia School of Law in 1992. He was in the United States Army Reserve, JAG Corps from 1955 to 1978.

In September 1960, O'Scannlain attended the founding conference of Young Americans for Freedom, held at William F. Buckley Jr.'s estate in Sharon, Connecticut. At that conference O'Scannlain was elected to serve on YAF's original Board of Directors.

He was a tax attorney for the Standard Oil Company of New Jersey and New York City from 1963 to 1965, and in private practice in Portland, Oregon, from 1965 to 1969. He was a deputy state attorney general in the Oregon Department of Justice from 1969 to 1971, then an Oregon public utility commissioner from 1971 to 1973, and finally Director of the Oregon Department of Environmental Quality from 1973 to 1974.

== Run for Congress ==
In 1974, O'Scannlain was the Republican candidate for the United States House of Representatives representing Oregon's 1st congressional district, but lost to Democrat Les AuCoin, the first time the district had ever elected a Democrat.

He returned to private practice in Portland from 1975 to 1986, also working as a consultant to the Office of the President-Elect of the United States from 1980 to 1981, and as a team leader for the President's Private Sector Survey on Cost Control (the Grace Commission) from 1982 to 1983. He chaired an advisory panel for the United States Secretary of Energy from 1983 to 1985.

== Federal judicial service ==
On August 11, 1986, President Ronald Reagan nominated O'Scannlain to a seat on the United States Court of Appeals for the Ninth Circuit vacated by Judge Robert Boochever. O'Scannlain was confirmed by the United States Senate on September 25, 1986, and received his commission on September 26, 1986. He assumed senior status on December 31, 2016.

In 2006, he was one of the judges in the panel that upheld the imprisonment of journalist Josh Wolf.

O'Scannlain has sent many of his law clerks on to become Supreme Court clerks, and he is regarded as a "feeder judge."

O'Scannlain continued to be involved in the politics of the federal court system after assuming senior status. He is a strong supporter of splitting the Ninth Circuit. He testified in 2017, before the U.S. Senate Judiciary Committee in support of breaking up the 9th Circuit. On July 31, 2018, he testified again in the Judiciary committee in support of breaking up the 9th Circuit Court of Appeals. He was joined on a panel by his former clerk, Brian Fitzpatrick, a professor at Vanderbilt Law School. Senator Mazie Hirono from Hawaii noted that his written testimony was almost word-for-word what he had contributed a year earlier.

He supported the nomination of Ryan Bounds, another former clerk, to the 9th Circuit Court vacancy created by his taking senior status. That nomination was withdrawn after controversial newspaper writings by Bounds as a student at Stanford University on the subject of the civil rights of minorities and women were discovered. Bounds had failed to deliver them to the Committee, and Oregon's Democratic Party senators withheld their blue slips. O'Scannlain was ultimately succeeded by another of his former clerks, Danielle J. Forrest.

== Rulings ==
In a controversial March 2010 case, O'Scannlain joined the majority opinion that Seattle police officers did not employ excessive force when they tasered a pregnant woman. He was joined by Judge Cynthia Holcomb Hall in a contested 2–1 decision (judge Marsha Berzon dissented).

On February 13, 2014, O'Scannlain wrote the majority opinion in the case of Peruta v. San Diego, and issued a ruling that stated California's may-issue concealed carry rules, as implemented by the County of San Diego, in combination with a ban on open carry in most areas of the state, violate the Second Amendment, because they together deny law-abiding citizens the right to bear arms in public for the lawful purpose of self-defense. Consuelo María Callahan joined him in the majority, while Sidney Runyan Thomas dissented. Peruta was later overturned en banc.

In Spokeo, Inc. v. Robins, O'Scannlain found that under the Fair Credit Reporting Act a plaintiff had standing to sue an allegedly inaccurate website. After that decision was found to be in error by the Supreme Court of the United States and remanded, O'Scannlain, again, found the plaintiff had standing to sue.

On July 24, 2018, O'Scannlain wrote the majority opinion in the case of Young v. Hawaii, which said that the Second Amendment protects the right to open carry in public. The State of Hawaii requested a rehearing en banc and the Ninth Circuit held the hearing on September 24, 2020. O'Scannlain participated in the en banc hearing.

On February 10, 2020, O'Scannlain wrote an opinion respecting the denial of en banc hearing in Edmo v. Corizon. The original panel had ruled that a prisoner with gender dysphoria had 8th amendment rights to sex reassignment surgery. O'Scannlain explained that as a judge in senior status, he cannot vote on these petitions, but he can issue statements respecting the denial of en banc. In the opinion, he mentioned that the 9th circuit is the first circuit to rule that denying gender reassignment surgery violates the 8th amendment, and that the 9th circuit is in conflict with other circuits' rulings, causing a circuit split.

In September 2020, O'Scannlain wrote for the majority when it found that a robocall defendant could not force the plaintiff into arbitration based on a customer agreement the plaintiff had signed with a separate company several years before it had been acquired by the holding company that now also owned the defendant. O'Scannlain also concurred separately to argue that even if the Federal Arbitration Act had preempted state law limitation on absurdity in contracts, it still did not require arbitration of claims wholly unrelated to the original contract.

== See also ==
- List of United States federal judges by longevity of service

Legal offices
Preceded by Robert Boochever	Judge of the United States Court of Appeals for the Ninth Circuit; 1986–2016	Succeeded by Danielle J. Forrest
