= Tucker Bounds =

American public relations professional

- Born: Hermiston, Oregon, U.S.
- Education: University of Oregon
- Political party: Republican
- Relatives: Ryan Bounds, brother

Tucker Bounds is a public relations professional, who has been active in Republican politics. He served as a spokesperson for the McCain 2008 presidential campaign. Bounds also served as the Deputy Campaign Manager, Communications, for former eBay CEO Meg Whitman's 2010 gubernatorial campaign in California. He is currently a Vice President of Communications at Facebook, in Menlo Park, California. He is also the co-founder of Sidewire, a political news analysis platform.

== Early life and education ==
Tucker Bounds was born in Oregon and raised in Hermiston, and graduated from Hermiston High School. He is a 2002 graduate of the University of Oregon.

== Career ==
=== Political career ===
Bounds began his political career an intern on a short-term assignment in the offices of Oregon Congressman Greg Walden and later worked as deputy press secretary for Oregon Senator Gordon Smith. In 2004 he was appointed as the Oregon Communications Director for the 2004 Bush campaign; in 2006, he was named as the Western States spokesperson for the Republican National Committee during the election cycle.

Bounds was a national spokesperson for John McCain's 2008 presidential campaign, serving to help manage his communications with the media. Jill Hazelbaker, another University of Oregon graduate, was McCain's communications director.

In 2009, Bounds was named partner in the Oregon firm of Quinn Thomas Public Affairs In June 2009, he joined the communications teams of Meg Whitman's 2010 gubernatorial campaign in California; she was the former CEO of eBay. He was named Deputy Campaign Manager.

In the summer of 2011, Bounds joined Facebook on its policy communications team. He concentrates on managing state and community relations, and has been concerned about changing ideas about privacy and protection of users' data.

=== Work with the McCain 2008 presidential campaign ===
A frequent public spokesperson for the 2008 McCain presidential campaign, Bounds made news after his September 1, 2008, interview with Campbell Brown of CNN. That interview concerned McCain's recently announced running mate Alaska Governor Sarah Palin. The interview was described as confrontational, as Brown challenged Bounds about Governor Palin's lack of foreign policy experience. Bounds said that "Palin’s experience running the Alaska National Guard made her more qualified than Obama to be commander in chief," but Brown didn’t buy it.

== Awards ==
Campaign & Elections' Politics magazine named Bounds one of its "Rising Stars" for 2009.
