= Shattered: Inside Hillary Clinton's Doomed Campaign =

2017 book by Jonathan Allen and Amie Parnes

- First edition
- Author: Jonathan Allen; Amie Parnes
- Language: English
- Subject: Hillary Clinton's 2016 presidential campaign
- Genre: Nonfiction
- Publisher: Crown Publishing Group
- Publication date: April 18, 2017
- Pages: 480
- ISBN: 978-0-553-44708-8
- Followed by: Lucky: How Joe Biden Barely Won The Presidency

Shattered: Inside Hillary Clinton's Doomed Campaign is an American book by political journalists Jonathan Allen and Amie Parnes about Hillary Clinton's unsuccessful 2016 presidential campaign. The book was published on April 18, 2017, by Crown Publishing Group, and examines why Clinton lost the election to Donald Trump. It is a follow-on to the authors' 2014 book HRC: State Secrets and the Rebirth of Hillary Clinton and made use of many of their large number of contacts within Clintons' circles. Shattered spent two weeks on the New York Times Best Seller list. Allen and Parnes wrote two follow up books, Lucky: How Joe Biden Barely Won the Presidency and Fight: Inside the Wildest Battle for the White House, about the 2020 and 2024 elections, respectively.

== Content ==
The book is based mainly on interviews with Clinton campaign staff that the authors conducted over a year and a half. Among its assertions are that some Clinton confidants attempted to get Robby Mook fired as her campaign manager, and that Huma Abedin targeted people who gave constructive criticism to the campaign. Another was that Bill Clinton was alarmed by the drop off in support for his wife among white working class voters, but that his concerns went unheeded within the campaign staff.

The book claims Clinton's campaign team had great difficulty in convincing voters of her authenticity through effective campaign slogans and themes. They failed to learn from both the Bernie Sanders and Donald Trump campaigns, who successfully targeted millennials and people disgruntled by the Rust Belt's economical state. A recurrent topic is also the campaign's failure to get up-to-date polling data, focusing on less expensive analysts instead. In addition, the book notes that the campaign staff's personal interaction with Hillary Clinton was limited and sporadic and that she mainly stayed aloof and remote from day-to-day campaign strategy planning.

== Reception ==
=== Critical ===
In a favorable review for The New York Times, Michiko Kakutani described Shattered as "compelling". David Shribman, in a review for The Globe and Mail, wrote that the book "...provides a sharp behind-the-news and behind-the-scenes palette of details of a campaign that, in retrospect, seems preordained to fail, and fail miserably."

Ron Elving of NPR said that the book effectively explained one Clinton paradox: "The Clinton we see here seems uniquely qualified for the highest office and yet acutely ill-suited to winning it. Something about her nature, at its best and its worst, continually inhibits her. Her struggle to escape her caricature only contributes to it."

=== Commercial ===
The book debuted at number one on The New York Times Best Seller list for its combined print and digital book editions. The hardcover book debuted at number two on The New York Times Best Seller list. The following week it stayed at number two, and then, in the next week, fell to the three slot. There it stayed for another week before falling to number seven in its fifth week. It then recovered slightly to number six before again tailing to number nine. It then spent an eighth and final week on the list. According to BookScan, it sold 125,000 copies.

== Response from campaign staff ==
Allen and Parnes assert that the Clinton campaign was marred by internal tensions and disputes, which some campaign staff have denied. Following the book's publication, some staffers posted photos of lighthearted moments from the campaign with sarcastic captions. Christa Reynolds, who served as the Clinton campaign's deputy communications director, disputed the book's characterizations of the campaign, writing in a blog post:

...after spending most of the campaign watching some people question the enthusiasm and our supporters, it's hard to read a depiction of the campaign that paints a dedicated, cohesive team as mercenaries with questionable motives who lacked a loyalty to a candidate described as 'imperial' and removed from the campaign. That's just not the campaign, the staff or the candidate I was in the trenches with for 18 months.

In response, author Parnes said that she and Allen "[stood] by our reporting," and that the photos posted by campaign staffers were not inconsistent with the book's depiction of the campaign en toto.

== Planned television series ==
In 2017, it was reported that TriStar Television had optioned the book for a limited series. However, no new developments have come from the project since its initial announcement.

== See also ==
- What Happened (Clinton book)
