= Sidewire =

- Website type: Social media, News aggregator
- Available in: English
- Owners: Andy Bromberg, Tucker Bounds
- Website: sidewire.com sidewire.io
- Commercial: Yes
- Registration: Required for curators; optional for readers
- Launched: September 2015
- Current status: Ceased operation June 23, 2017

Sidewire was a political news analysis platform and social network available via the web (sidewire.io) and as an iOS application. It was founded in 2012 by Andy Bromberg and Tucker Bounds, a former spokesperson for the 2008 presidential campaign of John McCain and former Facebook executive.

The platform was officially launched in September 2015, timed for the 2016 election cycle. Originally billed as "Twitter for politics," Sidewire distinguished itself by limiting those who could post original content to a vetted group of "newsmakers"—including journalists, campaign managers, and elected officials—while allowing the general public to follow the discussions.

Despite attracting high-profile contributors from outlets like The New York Times and The Washington Post, Sidewire struggled to monetize or build a sustainable user base beyond political insiders. By June 2017, the company had exhausted its $4.85 million in seed funding and ceased all operations.

== History ==
Sidewire was founded in 2012 by Andy Bromberg and Tucker Bounds. It was started with $4.85 million in seed funding from Spark Capital, with participation from Goldcrest Capital. The platform was launched in September 2015 as an app in the iOS marketplace. In June 2017, having burned through their funding and unable to secure further investment, Sidewire ceased operations.

== Platform ==
Sideline was curated by political journalists, analysts, candidates, campaign managers, and elected officials. Curators were responsible for uploading links to news and then providing a 250 character summary. The information was then pushed to the Sideline platform and also Twitter, Facebook, and LinkedIn. Initial curators included analysts and journalists from The Wall Street Journal, The New York Times, The Washington Post, ABC News, and NBC News.

== Former contributors ==
A partial list of former contributors to the platform

- Daniel Pfeiffer
- Lindsey Graham
- Jonathan Allen
