= Fight: Inside the Wildest Battle for the White House =

2025 book by Jonathan Allen and Amie Parnes

- Author: Jonathan Allen, Amie Parnes
- Language: English
- Subject: Joe Biden 2024 presidential campaign, Kamala Harris 2024 presidential campaign
- Genre: Nonfiction
- Publisher: HarperCollins
- Publication date: April 1, 2025
- Pages: 352
- ISBN: 978-0063438644
- Preceded by: Lucky: How Joe Biden Barely Won the Presidency

Fight: Inside the Wildest Battle for the White House is a 2025 book by Jonathan Allen and Amie Parnes that examines the 2024 United States presidential election. It details Joe Biden's 2024 reelection campaign, withdrawal from the election, and replacement with Kamala Harris as the Democratic nominee. It is the third book in their series about the presidential elections since 2016, after Shattered: Inside Hillary Clinton's Doomed Campaign (2017) and Lucky: How Joe Biden Barely Won the Presidency (2021).

== Reception ==
=== Sales ===
Fight debuted at #1 on the New York Times best-seller list for its combined print and digital book editions.

=== Critical response ===
Sam Tanenhaus, reviewing the book for The Washington Post, strongly criticized its contents, citing aspects such as the authors' neglecting to address any aspects or context of the presidential election other than that of the Democratic Party's own campaign. The examples cited include the word "Gaza" only being mentioned seven times, exclusively in the context of "lost votes;" Project 2025 being treated as "a failed Harris talking point" despite its prominent association with the Republican Party; and the brief treatments of Elon Musk and Stephen Miller, the latter of whom being described by Tanenhaus as "by most accounts the dominant policy-oriented brain in the current administration." The characterization of Donald Trump was also met by criticism, with the prose style being specifically referred to as "coronation" of Trump himself.

=== Response from Joe Rogan ===
Fight states that Kamala Harris was set to appear on The Joe Rogan Experience and traveled to Houston, Texas, to appear at a rally to be in proximity to Rogan's studio in Austin, but was told that the show could not record that day because Rogan was taking a "personal day," which was later discovered to be the same day Rogan interviewed Donald Trump. Rogan disputed the book's account, saying the Harris campaign never agreed to have her appear on the show, and that the authors never contacted him for the book.

=== Optioned for film and television ===
The book Fight has been optioned for film and television by Aline Brosh McKenna's production company Lean Machine.
