= Lucky: How Joe Biden Barely Won the Presidency =

2021 book

- Author: Jonathan Allen, Amie Parnes
- Language: English
- Subject: Joe Biden 2020 presidential campaign
- Genre: Nonfiction
- Publisher: Crown Publishing Group
- Publication date: March 2, 2021
- Pages: 528
- ISBN: 978-0-525-57422-4
- Preceded by: Shattered: Inside Hillary Clinton's Doomed Campaign
- Followed by: Fight: Inside the Wildest Battle for the White House

Lucky: How Joe Biden Barely Won the Presidency is a non-fiction book by Jonathan Allen and Amie Parnes, journalists for NBC News and The Hill, respectively. The book is about Joe Biden's successful campaign in the 2020 United States presidential election. Allen and Parnes had previously written the 2017 book Shattered: Inside Hillary Clinton's Doomed Campaign about Hillary Clinton's unsuccessful campaign in the 2016 election. A follow-up about the 2024 election, Fight: Inside the Wildest Battle for the White House, was published in 2025.

== Content ==
Lucky describes how, according to Allen and Parnes, Joe Biden "barely won the presidency". They describe conflicting ideas among Biden's campaign staff about political strategy, rhetoric, and policy. The book covers the campaign's response to matters such as the COVID-19 pandemic and ongoing racial unrest. The Biden campaign's navigation of the COVID-19 pandemic is given as one major reason for electoral success. It examines interactions between key Democratic Party figures and the campaign, such as Barack Obama, Hillary Clinton and Andrew Cuomo.

== Reception ==
Lucky never made The New York Times Best Seller list and sold 10,000 copies, far fewer than the 125,000 copies sold of Shattered.
