= Danielle J. Forrest =

American judge (born 1977)

Danielle Forrest
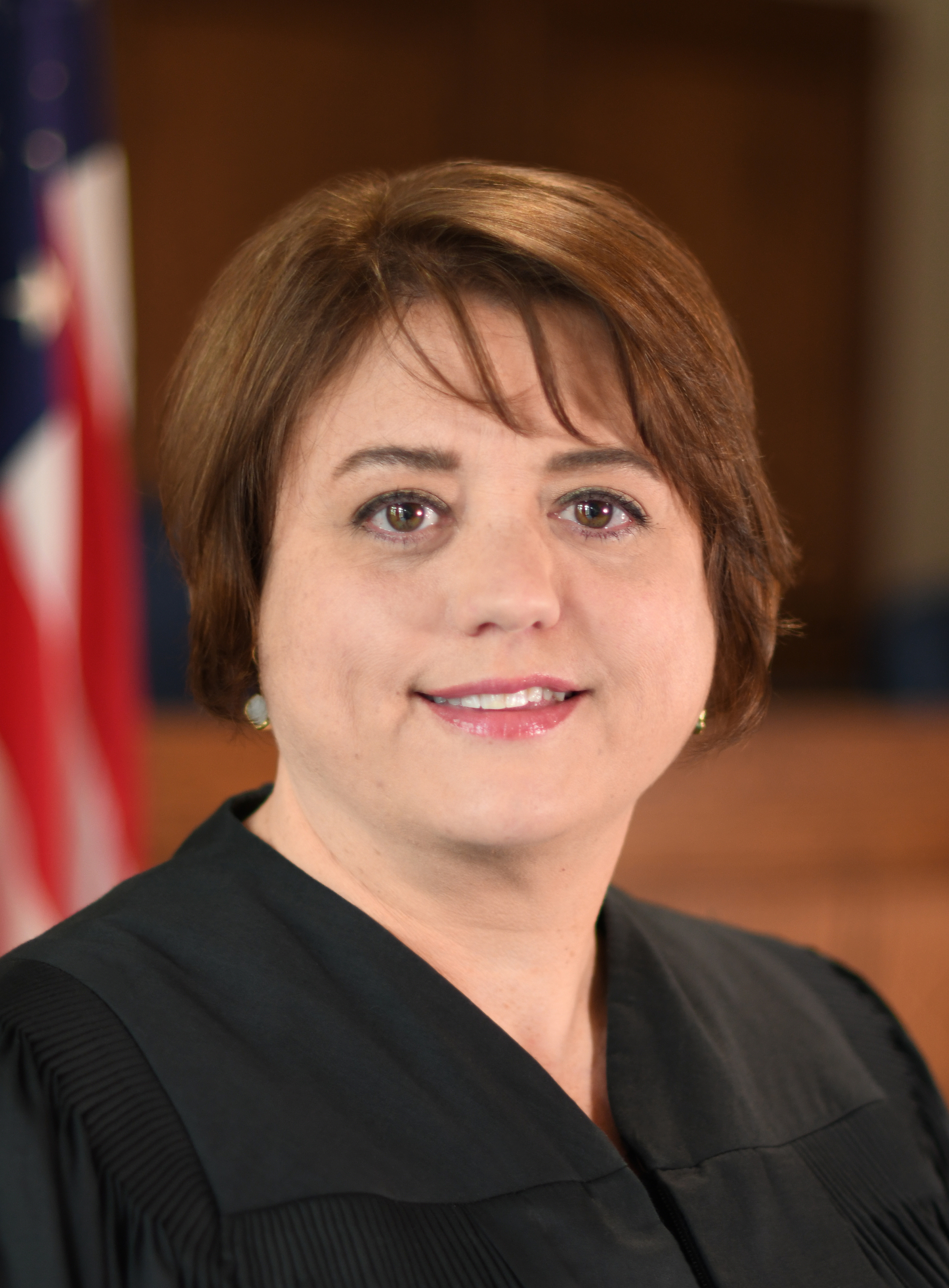

Judge of the United States Court of Appeals for the Ninth Circuit
- Incumbent
- Assumed office November 12, 2019
- Appointed by: Donald Trump
- Preceded by: Diarmuid O'Scannlain

Judge of the Washington County Circuit Court
- In office December 2017 – November 12, 2019
- Appointed by: Kate Brown
- Preceded by: Suzanne Upton
- Succeeded by: Brandon Thompson

Personal details
- Born: Danielle Jo Forrest; 1977 (age 48–49) Roseburg, Oregon, U.S.
- Education: Ricks College (AS); University of Idaho (BS, JD)

Danielle Jo Forrest, formerly known as Danielle Jo Hunsaker (born 1977), is a United States circuit judge of the United States Court of Appeals for the Ninth Circuit. Forrest was previously an Oregon state court judge for the Washington County Circuit Court from 2017 to 2019.

== Early life and education ==
Forrest was born in 1977 in Roseburg, Oregon. She earned an Associate of Science degree from Ricks College (now Brigham Young University–Idaho) in 1996. She studied at the University of Idaho, graduating in 2001 with a Bachelor of Science cum laude. She then attended the University of Idaho College of Law, where she was lead articles editor for the Idaho Law Review. She graduated in 2004 with a Juris Doctor summa cum laude.

== Legal career ==
After law school, Forrest served as a law clerk to judge Paul Joseph Kelly Jr. of the United States Court of Appeals for the Tenth Circuit from 2004 to 2005 and to judge Michael W. Mosman of the United States District Court for the District of Oregon from 2005 to 2007.

From 2007 to 2009, Forrest was in private practice with the law firm Stoel Rives in Portland, with a brief stint in 2008 as a law clerk for judge Diarmuid O'Scannlain of the Ninth Circuit. From 2009 to 2017, Forrest was in practice at the Portland, Oregon law firm Larkins Vacura Kayser, becoming a partner in 2014.

From 2011 to 2016, Forrest taught Advanced Civil Procedure as an adjunct professor at Lewis & Clark Law School.

== State court service ==
On November 9, 2017, Oregon Governor Kate Brown announced the appointment of Forrest to the Washington County Circuit Court to the seat vacated by Suzanne M. Upton, effective immediately. She resigned her post when she was elevated to be a federal Circuit Court judge.

== Federal judicial service ==
Forrest was one of four individuals recommended for the United States Court of Appeals for the Ninth Circuit by Oregon's two United States Senators, Ron Wyden and Jeff Merkley. Wyden and Merkley had both opposed Ryan Bounds, President Donald Trump's previous nominee to the Ninth Circuit seat, but agreed to turn in their blue slips for Forrest. On August 28, 2019, President Trump announced his intent to nominate Forrest to serve as a United States Circuit Judge of the United States Court of Appeals for the Ninth Circuit. On September 19, 2019, her nomination was sent to the United States Senate. She was nominated to fill the seat vacated by Judge Diarmuid O'Scannlain, who assumed senior status on December 31, 2016. On September 25, 2019, a hearing on her nomination was held before the Senate Judiciary Committee. On October 24, 2019, her nomination was reported out of committee by a 16–6 vote. On November 5, 2019, the Senate invoked cloture on her nomination by a 75–18 vote. On November 6, 2019, her nomination was confirmed by a 73–17 vote. She received her judicial commission on November 12, 2019. Her surname in court records changed from Hunsaker to Forrest in May 2021.

== Notable cases ==
On February 19, 2025, after United States District Court for the Western District of Washington enjoined the Trump administration's attempt to end birthright citizenship, Forrest was one of three judges who declined to stay the order. Forrest wrote a separate concurring opinion, citing the short timeframe in her vote to keep the injunction in place.

On July 23, 2025, Forrest authored the opinion in Yuga Labs Inc. v. Ripps, overturning a prior summary judgment that had awarded Yuga Labs $9 million in a trademark dispute over Non-fungible token(NFTs). The Ninth Circuit held that Yuga had not established that Ripps and co-defendant Jeremy Cahen caused consumer confusion, and remanded the case.

== Memberships ==
She was a member of the Federalist Society from 2002 to 2006 and again from 2017 to present.

Legal offices
Preceded by Diarmuid O'Scannlain	Judge of the United States Court of Appeals for the Ninth Circuit; 2019–present	Incumbent
