= Ryan Bounds =

American attorney (born 1973)

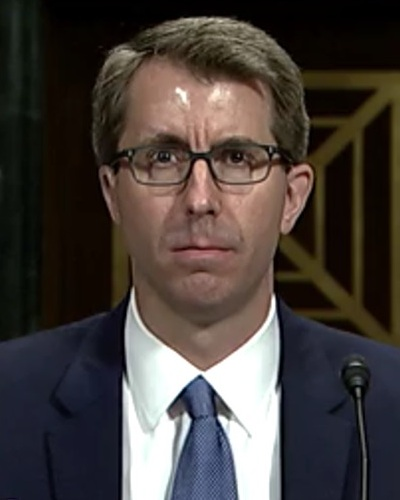
- Ryan Bounds in 2018
- Born: Ryan Wesley Bounds; June 28, 1973 (age 52); Umatilla, Oregon, U.S.
- Education: Stanford University (BA); Yale University (JD)
- Occupation: Lawyer
- Political party: Republican
- Relatives: Tucker Bounds (brother)

Ryan Wesley Bounds (born June 28, 1973) is an American attorney previously serving as an Assistant United States Attorney for the District of Oregon.

Bounds had been a nominee for a position as a United States circuit judge of the United States Court of Appeals for the Ninth Circuit, but his controversial nomination narrowly lost bipartisan support for confirmation in the Senate when it was revealed that, as an undergraduate, Bounds wrote columns criticizing outrage over vandalism of a gay pride statue. In July 2018, Senate Majority Leader Mitch McConnell announced that President Donald Trump would withdraw the nomination.

== Biography ==
Bounds was born in Umatilla, Oregon, on June 28, 1973. He earned his Bachelor of Arts in psychology and political science, with honors and distinction, from Stanford University in 1995 and his Juris Doctor from Yale Law School in 1999, where he was an editor of the Yale Law Journal and editor-in-chief of the Yale Law & Policy Review.

Early in his career, Bounds served as a law clerk to Judge Diarmuid O'Scannlain on the United States Court of Appeals for the Ninth Circuit from 1999 to 2000. In 2000, he was hired as an associate at the law firm of Stoel Rives LLP in Portland, Oregon. In 2004, he was hired by the United States Department of Justice as a Deputy Assistant Attorney General and Chief of Staff in the Office of Legal Policy. In 2008, he became a Special Assistant to the President for Domestic Policy, acting as the White House's primary policy expert on criminal and civil justice issues. Before becoming a special prosecutor he served as Special Assistant United States Attorney for the District of Columbia. In 2010, he became an Assistant United States Attorney for the District of Oregon, prosecuting criminal cases.

In 2024, Bounds was hired as a lawyer for Boeing.

== Failed nomination to U.S. Court of Appeals ==
On September 7, 2017, President Donald Trump nominated Bounds to serve as a United States Circuit Judge of the United States Court of Appeals for the Ninth Circuit, to the seat vacated by Judge Diarmuid O'Scannlain, who assumed senior status on December 31, 2016.

One week after Bounds was nominated, both of Oregon's U.S. Senators, Ron Wyden and Jeff Merkley, announced they would not return the blue slips for Bounds, saying they had not been adequately consulted on the nomination. The White House Counsel's Office said that it had contacted both senators on several occasions before nominating Bounds, but received very little feedback from either senator.

On January 3, 2018, Bounds' nomination was returned to Trump under Rule XXXI, Paragraph 6 of the United States Senate. On January 5, 2018, Trump announced his intent to renominate Bounds to a federal judgeship. On January 8, 2018, his renomination was sent to the Senate. In February 2018, the bipartisan commission cited by Wyden and Merkley found Bounds to be one of four suitable applicants for the judgeship. However, the Senators continued to refuse to turn in their blue slips, citing college newspaper articles Bounds wrote while a student at Stanford University in the early 1990s.

Prior to his nomination, Bounds did not disclose controversial columns written by him in The Stanford Review about campus sexual assault, workers' rights, ethnic minorities and gender discrimination to the Oregon judicial selection committee convened by the state's congressional delegation. Bounds said he was instructed to provide only material dating back to law school to the selection committee by a staffer of Senator Ron Wyden, who had helped to convene the commission. He did, however, provide those writings to the Senate Committee on the Judiciary. Subsequent to public disclosure of Bounds' college writings, five of the seven members of the Oregon selection committee indicated that had they seen those writings, they would not have recommended Bounds as a candidate for the vacancy. Though Bounds said he had not been compelled to produce writing before law school, the selection committee's chair later said that he had not disclosed the columns when broadly asked about any past controversies, in writing or otherwise. During his confirmation hearing, Bounds apologized for the writings, saying "I share the concerns of many that the rhetoric I used in debating campus politics back in the early '90s on Stanford's campus was often overheated, overbroad" and that his views were "not as respectful" as they should have been. Wyden said he did not believe in the sincerity of Bounds' apology, feeling it was intended only to secure his confirmation. "Nominees for the federal bench must be held to a higher standard," he said.

On May 9, 2018, a hearing on his nomination was held before the Senate Judiciary Committee. On June 7, 2018, his nomination was reported out of committee by an 11–10 vote. On July 18, 2018, the United States Senate invoked cloture on his nomination by a 50–49 vote. On July 19, 2018, Senate Majority Leader Mitch McConnell announced that Bounds's nomination would be withdrawn after Senator Tim Scott, a Republican, announced he could not support the nomination with the information he had at that point; Scott's stance left Bounds's nomination short of the number of votes needed for confirmation. On July 24, 2018, Bounds' nomination was officially withdrawn.

== Memberships ==
Bounds has been a member of the Federalist Society since approximately 2000.

== See also ==
- Donald Trump judicial appointment controversies
