= Stoel Rives =

American law firm

Stoel Rives LLP
- Headquarters: Portland, Oregon
- No. of offices: 10
- No. of attorneys: 326 (2023)
- No. of employees: 639 (2023)
- Major practice areas: Business law and litigation
- Key people: Melissa A. Jones, Managing Partner
- Revenue: $263.36 million (2022)
- Date founded: 1907
- Founder: Charles H. Carey, James B. Kerr
- Company type: Limited liability partnership
- Website: www.stoel.com

Stoel Rives LLP is a U.S. business law firm with 10 office locations in seven U.S. states and Washington, D.C. Headquartered in Portland, Oregon, in the Park Avenue West Tower, it is the largest law firm in the state of Oregon, having 326 attorneys and a total staff of 639 as of 2023. Stoel Rives handles corporate, energy, environmental, intellectual property, labor and employment, land use and construction, litigation, natural resources and renewable energy law.

== History ==
Stoel Rives began as the Portland-based firm of Carey & Kerr, which was founded in 1907. At the time, the firm was located at Third and Stark streets in the Chamber of Commerce Building. In 1911, it moved to the Yeon Building. In 1931, the firm's name became Carey, Hart, Spencer & McCulloch, with the latter being Charles E. McCulloch for which McCulloch Stadium in Salem, Oregon, is named. In 1970, the then named Davies, Biggs, Strayer, Stoel and Boley moved to the Georgia-Pacific Building (now Standard Insurance Center) on Fifth Avenue. In 1979, the firm merged with another large Portland firm, Rives, Bonyhadi and Smith, founded in 1935, to become Stoel, Rives, Boley, Fraser and Wyse ("Stoel Rives").

In 1987, Stoel Rives merged with Seattle-based Jones, Grey and Bayley, founded in 1912, to become Stoel, Rives, Boley, Jones & Grey. The firm expanded into Boise, Idaho in 1991, Salt Lake City, Utah in 1992, and California in 2001, establishing a presence in Sacramento, San Francisco and Lake Tahoe with the acquisition of Washburn, Briscoe & McCarthy. The firm's geographic footprint expanded further with the opening of offices in San Diego, California (2006), Minneapolis, Minnesota (2007), Anchorage, Alaska (2008) and Washington, D.C. (2013). The firm became Stoel Rives in 1996.

In January 2020, Stoel Rives named Melissa A. Jones as the Firm Managing Partner. Stoel Rives moved into the new Park Avenue West Tower in May 2016.

In July 2017, the firm laid off 17 administrative employees and outsourced staffing for its reception, IT, concierge, catering, and records departments to DTI.

== Awards ==
- Chambers and Partners currently rated 92 Stoel Rives lawyers among the best in their practice areas. The firm's Renewable and Alternative Energy Law practice and its Food and Beverage practice are both rated among the best in the United States by Chambers, with another 24 practice areas receiving recognition across multiple states. (2017)
- The firm currently has 137 attorneys and 67 legal practice categories listed in Best Lawyers in America, (2018).
- In its "Best Law Firms in America" survey, U.S. News & World Reportranks Stoel Rives national Tier 1 for Construction Law, Corporate Law, Energy Law, Environmental Law, Litigation - Construction, Litigation - Environmental, Natural Resources Law, Real Estate Law, and Timber Law. In addition, the firm received 97 metropolitan Tier 1 rankings, 24 metropolitan Tier 2 rankings, and 7 metropolitan Tier 3 rankings. (2018)
- Stoel Rives is rated among the nation's 30 Best Law Firms for Outstanding Client Service, in an independent study conducted by the BTI Consulting Group.

== Publications ==
Stoel Rives publishes a series of "Law of" handbooks, intended to provide a general overview of the legal and business issues involved in specific emerging or rapidly developing areas of law. The series includes The Law of Wind—A Guide to Business and Legal Issues, Lava Law—Legal Issues in Geothermal Energy Development, The Law of Solar Energy—A Guide to Business and Legal Issues, The Law of Outdoor Industries—A Guide to Business and Legal Issues, and The Construction Lien in Washington—A Legal Analysis for the Construction Industry.

== Notable lawyers and alumni ==
- Rene Gonzalez, Portland City Council member
- Susan P. Graber, judge on the United States Court of Appeals for the Ninth Circuit
- Danielle J. Hunsaker, judge on the United States Court of Appeals for the Ninth Circuit
- Rives Kistler, associate justice of the Oregon Supreme Court
- Greg Macpherson, member of the Oregon House of Representatives (D-38th district (2003 - 2009))
- Hardy Myers, Oregon Attorney General (1997-2008)
- Wendy J. Olson, United States Attorney for the District of Idaho (2010 - 2017)
- Jill Pohlman, justice of the Utah Supreme Court
- Katie Porter, U.S. Representative for California's 45th congressional district (2002-2004)
- Rey Ramsey, CEO of One Economy Corporation
