= HRC: State Secrets and the Rebirth of Hillary Clinton =

2014 book by Amie Parnes and Jonathan Allen

- Authors: Amie Parnes and Jonathan Allen
- Language: English
- Publisher: Crown Publishers
- Publication date: February 11, 2014
- Pages: 448
- ISBN: 0-8041-3675-0
- Followed by: Shattered: Inside Hillary Clinton's Doomed Campaign

HRC: State Secrets and the Rebirth of Hillary Clinton is a 2014 book written by journalists Amie Parnes and Jonathan Allen detailing the tenure of Hillary Clinton as United States secretary of state and her political recovery following her loss in the 2008 Democratic presidential primaries.

== The list ==
Parnes and Allen claimed that, following Hillary's 2008 primary loss, she and Bill created a "hit list" so that "friends could be rewarded, and enemies punished". In the last days of Clinton's 2008 campaign, many became convinced that she had failed in part because of the lack of support from those that the couple had helped in the past. Staff compiled a list of Democratic Party politicians and figures who had remained true and those who had turned against them. Listed persons were ranked from 1 to 7, with 7 being reserved for those perceived to be the greatest betrayers. Examples of politicians the book claims were considered by the Clinton campaign to be the most egregious offenders are Claire McCaskill, John Kerry, and Jason Altmire.

== Reception ==
The media took interest in the "enemies list", but reviews of the book were largely negative, criticizing it as overly praiseful of Clinton with few new insights. Jodi Kantor of The New York Times wrote: "Their Clinton is the stock version, Democratic edition: gracious in defeat and fearless in negotiation, almost perfectly in sync with Obama, rarely making wrong bets despite choices of bewildering complexity."

=== Reviews ===
- Kantor, Jodi (February 20, 2014). "Madame Secretary". The New York Times.
- Karl, Jonathan (February 10, 2014). "Book Review: 'HRC' by Jonathan Allen and Amie Parnes". The Wall Street Journal.
- Neff, Christopher (Sep 2014). "Smart punches : the ex-First Lady as pugilistic 'idealist realist'". Australian Book Review. 364: 24–25.
- Wolf, Naomi (February 24, 2014). "HRC: State Secrets and the Rebirth of Hillary Clinton by Jonathan Allen and Amie Parnes – review". The Observer.

== See also ==
- Nixon's Enemies List
