= Sandy Hume =

American journalist (1969–1998)

- Born: Alexander Britton Hume Jr. September 2, 1969; Washington D.C., U.S.
- Died: February 23, 1998 (aged 28); Arlington, Virginia, U.S.
- Resting place: Oak Hill Cemetery; Washington, D.C., U.S.
- Education: Middlebury College
- Occupation: Journalist for The Hill
- Notable credit(s): The aborted 1997 coup by Rep. Bill Paxon against Speaker of the House; Newt Gingrich

Alexander Britton Hume Jr. (September 2, 1969 – February 23, 1998), known as Sandy Hume, was an American journalist. He worked for The Hill newspaper in Washington, D.C. He was the son of Brit Hume (former Fox News Channel managing editor) and Clare Jacobs Stoner.

== Career ==
Born and raised in the Washington, D.C. area, Hume attended Middlebury College in Vermont, lettered in varsity lacrosse for the Panthers, and graduated with honors. He embarked on a career in journalism, and broke the story of the aborted 1997 "coup" by U.S. Rep. Bill Paxon (R-NY) against Speaker Newt Gingrich. Another of the plotters, Majority Leader Dick Armey (R-TX), reportedly scuttled the coup when he learned that Paxon, and not he, would replace Gingrich.

Veteran Washington reporter and commentator Robert Novak called Hume's Republican coup story "perhaps the greatest expose of behind-the-scenes Capitol Hill machinations that I had seen in half a century of Congress-watching." When Republican spin-doctors claimed that they merely wanted to warn Gingrich about the "coup", Novak wrote that "after extensive checking of sources, I am convinced that Hume's reporting was 100 percent correct." Brit Hume stated that Sandy Hume posted Novak's confirmation column on his wall. When Sandy Hume died in 1998 at age 28, he had been nominated for a Pulitzer Prize and had been pursued by U.S. News and Fox News.

== Death ==
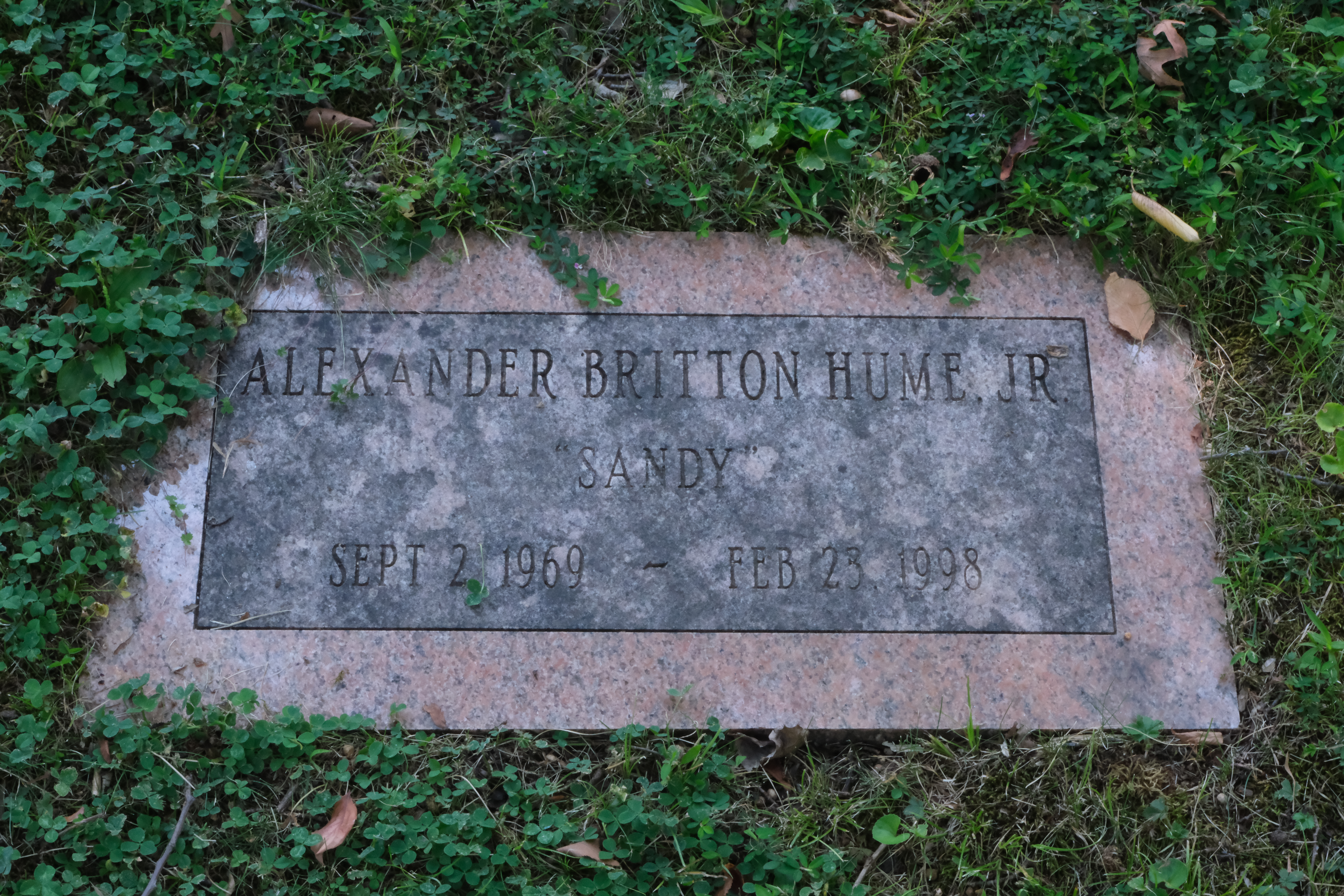
Grave of Hume at Oak Hill Cemetery

Hume died by suicide in his apartment in Arlington, Virginia. In the months before his death Hume, an alcoholic, began drinking again. The night before he died he was jailed for drunk driving and tried to hang himself in the U.S. Park Police jail cell. He was evaluated at a psychiatric facility and released. He went home and killed himself with a hunting rifle after leaving a lengthy note expressing shame at the previous night's events. He was buried at Oak Hill Cemetery in Washington, D.C.

== Sandy Hume Memorial Award ==
The National Press Club honors Hume's memory with the Sandy Hume Memorial Award for Excellence in Political Journalism, awarded annually.
