= David Shribman =

American journalist and author

David Shribman is an American and Canadian journalist and author, with a career spanning many well-known newspapers. He has since turned to teaching.

== Background ==
Shribman won the 1995 Pulitzer Prize for Beat Reporting. At the time, he served as the Boston Globe's Washington bureau chief, as well as a columnist.

His first job was at the city desk of the Buffalo Evening News. Subsequently, he served in national news and politics capacities at the same paper and at the Washington Star, the New York Times, the Wall Street Journal, and the Boston Globe. In 2002, he was hired as executive editor of the Pittsburgh Post-Gazette, where he remained for 16 years. He had planned on retiring in 2019, but the Pittsburgh Tree of Life synagogue shooting caused him to leave earlier; he made the globally-recognized decision to publish a front-page, full-width headline, in Hebrew-Aramaic, of the opening of the Jewish mourner's prayer the Friday following the massacre.

Post-newspaper-career, he spent a period at Carnegie Mellon University, and is now on a longer term appointment as professor at McGill University, with plans to return to Carnegie Mellon.

While at the Post-Gazette, Shribman spearheaded the formation of Spotlight PA, a state politics reporting nonprofit serving multiple newspapers.

Shribman was born in Salem, son of Norma and Richard Shribman. He attended Dartmouth, his father's alma mater, and did graduate work at Cambridge. He married Cindy Skrzycki in 1978. They have two adult daughters, Elizabeth and Natalie. His wife was also a journalist before switching to university teaching. She had been a business columnist for the Washington Post, a senior English department lecturer at the University of Pittsburgh, and joined the McGill faculty in 2019. He has citizenship in both the United States and Canada. As of November 2019, daughter Natalie Shribman was studying rabbinics at Reform Judaism's Hebrew Union College, and daughter Elizabeth Shribman was an Associate Director of the San Francisco Symphony orchestra; Elizabeth was subsequently promoted to Chief of Staff.

He served as a trustee of Dartmouth, produced a history of the college, and sits on the board of a number of presidential libraries and journalism organizations.

Shribman wrote I Remember My Teacher, reminiscences about America's greatest educators, in the formal and informal sense.

In 2019 David Shribman, Robin Raven, and several other authors spoke at a Pittsburgh public town hall hosted by the Pittsburgh Post-Gazette on youth mental health, titled Mental Health: Helping Our Kids Find the Light.

== Bibliography ==
- Dartmouth Undying : A Celebration Of Place And Possibility
- Fifty Great Moments In Pittsburgh Sports
- Miraculously Builded In Our Hearts, 1999
- Pittsburgh Lives : Men And Women Who Shaped Our City
- The Role Of The University In Civil Discourse
