= 2001 Arkansas's 3rd congressional district special election =

2001 Arkansas's 3rd congressional district election
- November 20, 2001

Arkansas's 3rd congressional district
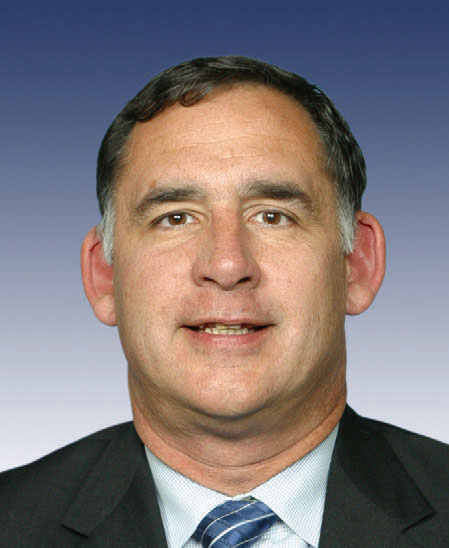

| Nominee | John Boozman | Mike Hathorn |
| Party | Republican | Democratic |
| Popular vote | 52,894 | 40,137 |
| Percentage | 55.55% | 42.15% |
- County results Boozman: 50–60% 60–70% Hathorn: 40–50% 50–60% 60–70%
U.S. Representative before election
Asa Hutchinson
Republican
Elected U.S. Representative
John Boozman
Republican

The United States House of Representatives special election in Arkansas's 3rd congressional district was held on November 20, 2001, to select the successor to Asa Hutchinson who resigned upon appointment as director of the Drug Enforcement Administration.

Following Hutchinson's resignation, Governor Mike Huckabee called a Special Election to be held on November 20, 2001. Both major party primaries were held on September 25 and both major parties required primary runoff elections, which were held on October 16.

The winner would serve the remaining unexpired term ending on January 3, 2003. They would be eligible to run for reelection in 2002.

Candidates included several State Legislators including incumbent State Senator Gunner DeLay of Fort Smith and incumbent State Representatives Jim Hendren of Gravette, Michael Hathorn of Huntsville, and Jo Carson of Fort Smith. The last two members of Congress to hold this seat, Tim Hutchinson and Asa Hutchinson, are the uncles of State Representative Jim Hendren, who was eliminated in the Republican Primary.

== Republican Primary ==
- John Boozman, optometrist and Rogers Public School Board Member
- Gunner DeLay, State Senator
- Jim Hendren, State Representative
- Brad Cates

Republican primary results
| Party | Candidate | Votes | % |
|---|---|---|---|
| Republican | John Boozman | 16,330 | 43.24 |
| Republican | Gunner DeLay | 10,431 | 27.62 |
| Republican | Jim Hendren | 9,403 | 24.90 |
| Republican | Brad Cates | 1,602 | 4.24 |
| Total votes | | 37,766 | 100.00 |

Republican primary runoff results
| Party | Candidate | Votes | % |
|---|---|---|---|
| Republican | John Boozman | 19,583 | 56.58 |
| Republican | Gunner DeLay | 15,029 | 43.42 |
| Total votes | | 34,612 | 100.00 |

== Democratic Primary ==
=== Candidates ===
- Mike Hathorn, State Representative
- Jo Carson, State Representative
- Norman "Bill" Williams, Jr.

Democratic primary results
| Party | Candidate | Votes | % |
|---|---|---|---|
| Democratic | Mike Hathorn | 13,282 | 47.13 |
| Democratic | Jo Carson | 13,087 | 46.44 |
| Democratic | Norman "Bill" Williams, Jr. | 1,813 | 6.43 |
| Total votes | | 28,182 | 100.00 |

Democratic primary runoff results
| Party | Candidate | Votes | % |
|---|---|---|---|
| Democratic | Mike Hathorn | 15,356 | 52.61 |
| Democratic | Jo Carson | 13,832 | 47.39 |
| Total votes | | 29,188 | 100.00 |

== Special election ==
Arkansas's 3rd congressional district special election, 2001
| Party | Candidate | Votes | % |
|---|---|---|---|
| Republican | John Boozman | 52,894 | 55.55 |
| Democratic | Mike Hathorn | 40,137 | 42.15 |
| Green | Sarah Marsh | 1,773 | 1.86 |
| Freedom Party | Ralph Forbes | 419 | 0.44 |
| Total votes | | 95,223 | 100.00 |
| Republican hold | | | |

=== By county ===
| County | John Boozman Republican | | Mike Hathorn Democratic | | All others | | Margin | | Total |
| County | # | % | # | % | # | % | # | % | Total |
|---|---|---|---|---|---|---|---|---|---|
| Baxter | 2,989 | 66.5% | 1,434 | 31.9% | 74 | 1.6% | 1,555 | 34.6% | 4,497 |
| Boone | 15,086 | 68.4% | 6,615 | 30.0% | 339 | 1.6% | 8,471 | 38.4% | 22,040 |
| Boone | 2,271 | 54.8% | 1,813 | 43.8% | 57 | 1.4% | 458 | 11.0% | 4,141 |
| Carroll | 1,438 | 47.2% | 1,506 | 49.4% | 104 | 3.4% | -68 | -2.2% | 3,048 |
| Crawford | 3,306 | 56.2% | 2,442 | 41.5% | 136 | 2.3% | 864 | 14.7% | 5,884 |
| Franklin | 881 | 39.8% | 1,307 | 59.1% | 25 | 1.1% | -426 | 19.3% | 2,213 |
| Johnson | 1,117 | 44.6% | 1,349 | 53.9% | 37 | 1.5% | -232 | -9.3% | 2,503 |
| Logan | 1,142 | 40.0% | 1,678 | 58.7% | 38 | 1.4% | -536 | -18.7% | 2,858 |
| Madison | 1,158 | 32.2% | 2,391 | 66.5% | 49 | 1.4% | -1,233 | -33.3% | 3,598 |
| Marion | 915 | 53.0% | 781 | 45.3% | 29 | 1.7% | 134 | 7.7% | 1,725 |
| Newton | 561 | 35.3% | 997 | 62.7% | 32 | 2.0% | -436 | 27.4% | 1,590 |
| Polk | 1,171 | 54.5% | 936 | 43.6% | 41 | 1.9% | 235 | 10.9% | 2,148 |
| Pope | 2,745 | 54.6% | 2,218 | 44.2% | 60 | 1.2% | 527 | 10.4% | 5,023 |
| Scott | 575 | 38.3% | 889 | 59.3% | 36 | 2.4% | -314 | -21.0% | 1,500 |
| Sebastian | 8,442 | 62.0% | 4,867 | 35.7% | 316 | 2.3% | 3,575 | 26.3% | 13,625 |
| Washington | 9,511 | 50.5% | 8,514 | 45.2% | 826 | 4.3% | 997 | 5.3% | 18,851 |
| Totals | 53,308 | 55.7% | 40,237 | 42.0% | 2,199 | 2.3% | 13,071 | 13.7% | 95,744 |
