= United States Senate Agriculture Subcommittee on Commodities, Derivatives, Risk Management, and Trade =

The U.S. Senate Agriculture Subcommittee on Commodities, Derivatives, Risk Management, and Trade is one of five subcommittees of the U.S. Senate Committee on Agriculture, Nutrition and Forestry.

This subcommittee has jurisdiction over legislation on agricultural commodities, including cotton, dairy products, feed grains, wheat, tobacco, peanuts, sugar, wool, rice, oilseeds and soybeans and price and income support programs.

== Name changes ==
The subcommittee was renamed for the 119th United States Congress (2025).

It was previously:

- 115th–118th Congresses: Subcommittee on Commodities, Risk Management, and Trade
- 112th–114th Congresses: Subcommittee on Commodities, Markets, Trade and Risk Management
- 111th Congress: Subcommittee on Production, Income Protection and Price Support
- 110th Congress: Subcommittee on Production, Income Protection and Price Support Jurisdiction
- 109th Congress: Subcommittee on Production and Price Competitiveness

== Members, 119th Congress ==
Majority	Minority
Cindy Hyde-Smith, Mississippi, Chair; Chuck Grassley, Iowa; Jerry Moran, Kansas; Mitch McConnell, Kentucky; Tommy Tuberville, Alabama; John Thune, South Dakota	Cory Booker, New Jersey, Ranking Member; Dick Durbin, Illinois; Adam Schiff, California; John Fetterman, Pennsylvania; Elissa Slotkin, Michigan
Ex officio
John Boozman, Arkansas	Amy Klobuchar, Minnesota

== Historical subcommittee rosters ==
=== 116th Congress ===
Majority	Minority
John Boozman, Arkansas, Chair; John Thune, South Dakota; John Hoeven, North Dakota; Cindy Hyde-Smith, Mississippi; David Perdue, Georgia (until January 3,2020); Chuck Grassley, Iowa; Kelly Loeffler, Georgia (from January 3,2020)	Sherrod Brown, Ohio, Ranking Member; Michael Bennet, Colorado; Kirsten Gillibrand, New York; Tina Smith, Minnesota
Ex officio
Pat Roberts, Kansas	Debbie Stabenow, Michigan

=== 117th Congress ===
Majority	Minority
Raphael Warnock, Georgia, Chair; Sherrod Brown, Ohio; Dick Durbin, Illinois; Tina Smith, Minnesota; Kirsten Gillibrand, New York; Ben Ray Luján, New Mexico	John Hoeven, North Dakota, Ranking Member; Mitch McConnell, Kentucky; Cindy Hyde-Smith, Mississippi; Tommy Tuberville, Alabama; Chuck Grassley, Iowa; John Thune, South Dakota
Ex officio
Debbie Stabenow, Michigan	John Boozman, Arkansas

=== 118th Congress ===
Majority	Minority
Tina Smith, Minnesota, Chair; Cory Booker, New Jersey; Dick Durbin, Illinois; John Fetterman, Pennsylvania; Kirsten Gillibrand, New York; Ben Ray Luján, New Mexico; Raphael Warnock, Georgia	Cindy Hyde-Smith, Mississippi, Ranking Member; Mitch McConnell, Kentucky; Tommy Tuberville, Alabama; Chuck Grassley, Iowa; Joni Ernst, Iowa
Ex officio
Debbie Stabenow, Michigan	John Boozman, Arkansas
