= United States Senate Agriculture Subcommittee on Food and Nutrition, Specialty Crops, Organics, and Research =

The U.S. Senate Agriculture Subcommittee on Food and Nutrition, Specialty Crops, Organics, and Research is one of five subcommittees of the U.S. Senate Committee on Agriculture, Nutrition and Forestry.

== Name changes ==
The subcommittee has had several names in recent years. The current name has been in effect since the 117th United States Congress (2021).

It was previously:

- 115th-116th Congresses: Nutrition, Agricultural Research, and Specialty Crops
- 112th-114th Congresses: Subcommittee on Nutrition, Specialty Crops, Food and Agricultural Research
- Prior to 112th Congress: Subcommittee on Nutrition and Hunger, Nutrition and Family Farms.

== Jurisdiction ==
This subcommittee has jurisdiction over "domestic and international nutrition and food assistance and hunger prevention; school and child nutrition programs; local and healthy food initiatives; futures, options and derivatives; pesticides; and general legislation". The origins of the subcommittee lay in the Senate Select Committee on Nutrition and Human Needs that was active from 1968 to 1977 before being subsumed into the Agriculture Committee.

== Members, 119th Congress ==
| Majority | Minority |
|---|---|
| Mitch McConnell, Kentucky, Chair; Roger Marshall, Kansas; John Hoeven, North Dakota; Tommy Tuberville, Alabama; Jim Justice, West Virginia; Chuck Grassley, Iowa | Ben Ray Luján, New Mexico, Ranking Member; Raphael Warnock, Georgia; John Fetterman, Pennsylvania; Tina Smith, Minnesota; Cory Booker, New Jersey |
Ex officio
| John Boozman, Arkansas | Amy Klobuchar, Minnesota |

=== 118th Congress ===
| Majority | Minority |
|---|---|
| John Fetterman, Pennsylvania, Chair; Sherrod Brown, Ohio; Amy Klobuchar, Minnesota; Kirsten Gillibrand, New York; Raphael Warnock, Georgia; Cory Booker, New Jersey | Mike Braun, Indiana, Ranking Member; Mitch McConnell, Kentucky; Joni Ernst, Iowa; Roger Marshall, Kansas; Tommy Tuberville, Alabama |
Ex officio
| Debbie Stabenow, Michigan | John Boozman, Arkansas |
