= United States Senate Agriculture Subcommittee on Conservation, Forestry, Natural Resources, and Biotechnology =

The U.S. Senate Agriculture Subcommittee on Conservation, Climate, Forestry, and Natural Resources is one of five subcommittees of the U.S. Senate Committee on Agriculture, Nutrition and Forestry. Prior to the 117th Congress, it was named the Subcommittee on Conservation, Forestry and Natural Resources. Prior to the 119th Congress, it was named the Subcommittee on Conservation, Climate, Forestry, and Natural Resources

This subcommittee oversees programs regarding conservation and protection of natural resources, regulation of pesticides and agriculture biotechnology, and forestry.

Related Agencies: Natural Resources Conservation Service, Animal and Plant Health Inspection Service, and the United States Forest Service, as well as EPA's Office of Chemical Safety and Pollution Prevention.

== Members, 119th Congress ==
Majority	Minority
Roger Marshall, Kansas, Chair; Jim Justice, West Virginia; John Hoeven, North Dakota; John Thune, South Dakota; Joni Ernst, Iowa; Cindy Hyde-Smith, Mississippi	Michael Bennet, Colorado, Ranking Member; Ben Ray Luján, New Mexico; Raphael Warnock, Georgia; Peter Welch, Vermont; Adam Schiff, California
Ex officio
John Boozman, Arkansas	Amy Klobuchar, Minnesota

== Historical membership rosters ==
=== 118th Congress ===
Majority	Minority
Michael Bennet, Colorado, Chair; Amy Klobuchar, Minnesota; Ben Ray Luján, New Mexico; Tina Smith, Minnesota; Raphael Warnock, Georgia; Peter Welch, Vermont	Roger Marshall, Kansas, Ranking Member; John Hoeven, North Dakota; Cindy Hyde-Smith, Mississippi; Mitch McConnell, Kentucky; John Thune, South Dakota
Ex officio
Debbie Stabenow, Michigan	John Boozman, Arkansas
