= John Boozman =

American politician and optometrist (born 1950)

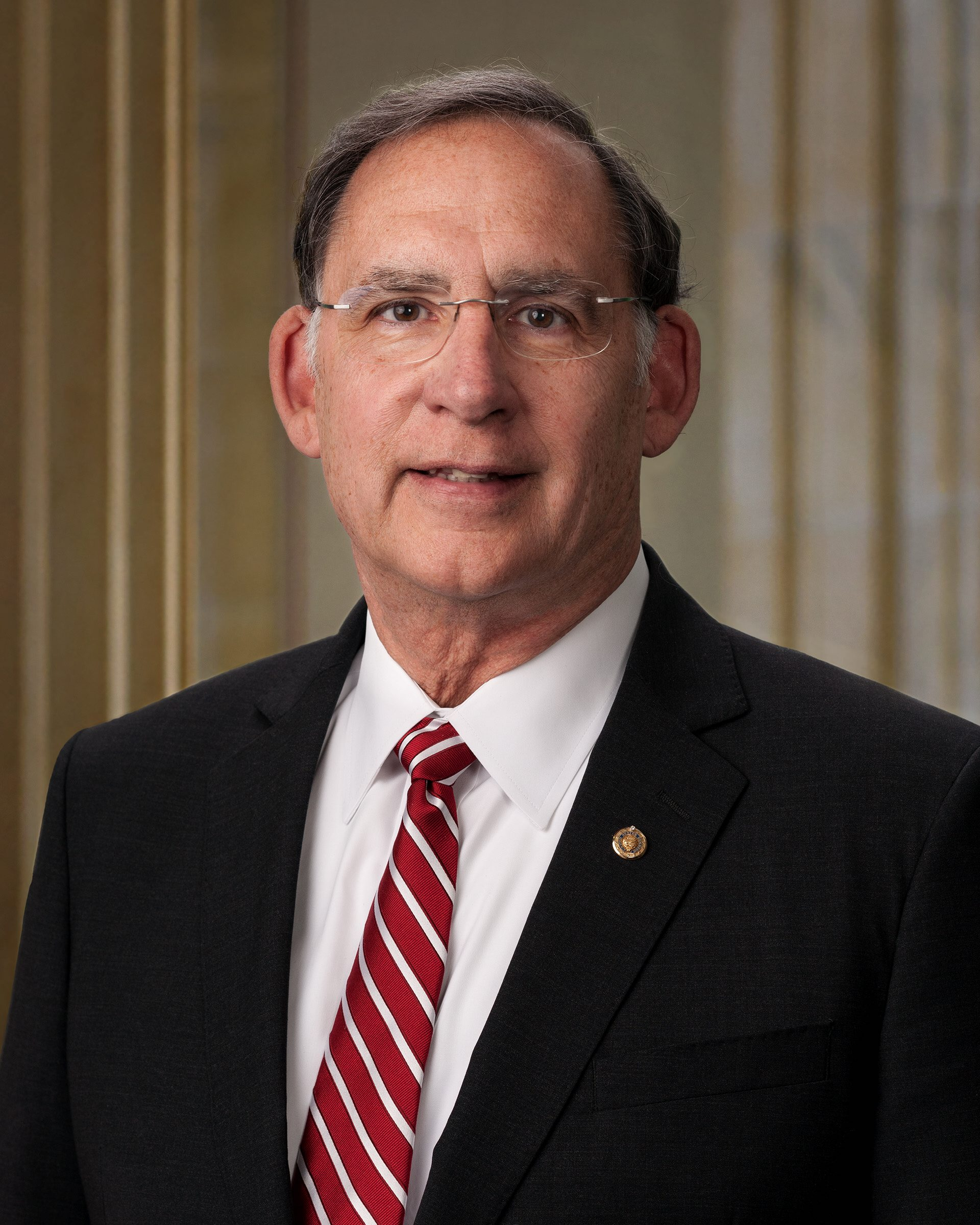
- Official portrait, 2017

Chair of the Senate Agriculture Committee
- Incumbent
- Assumed office January 3, 2025
- Preceded by: Debbie Stabenow

Ranking Member of the Senate Agriculture Committee
- In office February 3, 2021 – January 3, 2025
- Preceded by: Debbie Stabenow
- Succeeded by: Amy Klobuchar

United States Senator from Arkansas
- Incumbent
- Assumed office January 3, 2011 Serving with Tom Cotton
- Preceded by: Blanche Lincoln

Member of the U.S. House of Representatives from Arkansas's 3rd district
- In office November 20, 2001 – January 3, 2011 (Note: Boozman's official service begins on the date of the special election, but he was not sworn in until November 29, 2001.)
- Preceded by: Asa Hutchinson
- Succeeded by: Steve Womack

Personal details
- Born: John Nichols Boozman; December 10, 1950 (age 75) Shreveport, Louisiana, U.S.
- Party: Republican
- Spouse: Cathy Marley (m. 1972)
- Children: 3
- Relatives: Fay Boozman (brother)
- Education: University of Arkansas (attended); Southern College of Optometry (OD)
- Website: Senate website Campaign website
- John Boozman's voice John Boozman on recycling. Recorded April 19, 2023

John Nichols Boozman (/ˈboʊz.mən/ BOHZ-mən; born December 10, 1950) is an American politician and former optometrist serving as the senior United States senator from Arkansas, a seat he has held since 2011. From 2001 to 2011, he served as the U.S. representative for Arkansas's 3rd congressional district. A member of the Republican Party, Boozman has been the dean of Arkansas's congressional delegation since 2013.

Boozman was born in Shreveport, Louisiana, where his father was stationed with the U.S. Air Force, but the family eventually returned to Fort Smith, Arkansas, where he was raised. He is the brother of the late state senator Fay Boozman. He attended the University of Arkansas, where he played football for the Arkansas Razorbacks, and later graduated from the Southern College of Optometry. He co-founded a private optometry clinic in 1977 and worked as a volunteer optometrist for low-income families.

Boozman was first elected to Congress in a 2001 special election for Arkansas's 3rd congressional district. In the House, he served as assistant majority whip and sat on the Republican Policy Committee. He was an advocate for drug policy issues and chaired the Veterans' Affairs Economic Opportunity Subcommittee, where he led the passage of bills expanding services for unemployed veterans.

In 2010, Boozman was elected to the U.S. Senate, defeating Democratic incumbent Blanche Lincoln. He is only the second Republican to be elected to the U.S. Senate from Arkansas since Reconstruction. Boozman was reelected in 2016 and 2022.

== Early life, education and career ==
Boozman was born in Shreveport, Louisiana, the son of Marie E. (née Nichols) and Fay Winford Boozman, Jr. Boozman's father, whose last address was in Rogers, Arkansas, was a Master Sergeant in the United States Air Force. His elder brother, Fay Boozman, was also a politician. After graduating from Northside High School in Fort Smith, Arkansas, Boozman played football for the Arkansas Razorbacks at the University of Arkansas, which he attended from 1969 to 1973, while completing his pre-optometry requirements. He did not graduate from the University of Arkansas. He graduated from the Southern College of Optometry in 1977 and entered private practice that same year as co-founder of BoozmanHof Regional Eye Clinic in Rogers, which has become a major provider of eye care to Northwest Arkansas. He established the low vision program at the Arkansas School for the Blind in Little Rock and worked as a volunteer optometrist at an area clinic that provides medical services to low-income families.

Before his election to Congress, Boozman served two terms on the Rogers Public School Board, which governs one of Arkansas's largest school districts.

== U.S. House of Representatives ==
=== Elections ===
Boozman was elected to Congress in a 2001 special election after his predecessor, Asa Hutchinson, resigned to become the head of the Drug Enforcement Administration. He defeated Democratic state representative Mike Hathorn in 2001. Boozman was unopposed in 2002, defeated Democratic State Representative Jan Judy 59%-38% in 2004, and defeated Democratic nominee Woodrow Anderson III in 2006. The Democrats did not field a candidate against him in 2008, and he won with over 78% of the vote against token opposition from a Green Party candidate.

=== Tenure ===
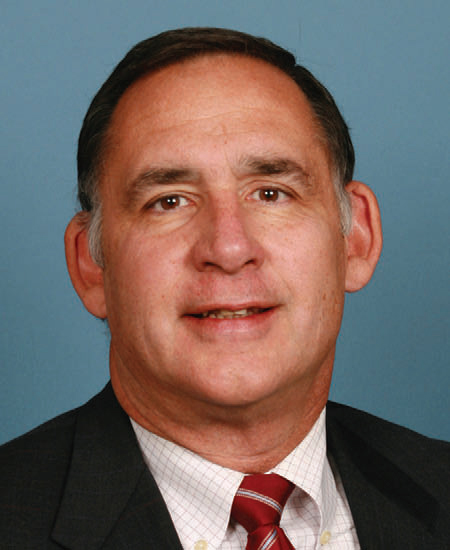
Then Congressman Boozman during the 111th Congress

In October 2002, Boozman voted in favor of the Iraq Resolution that led to the Iraq War. In 2011, after 4,500 Americans and hundreds of thousands of civilians had died, he said: "Right now, Iraq has a stable police force, a stable military. And hopefully that will continue, and they’ll be successful in having a form of democracy that is not a safe haven for terrorism in the future.”

Starting during the 108th Congress, Boozman served as an Assistant Whip, making him responsible for helping House Republican Whips Roy Blunt and Eric Cantor secure the votes for or against major legislation.

Boozman was also named to the Speaker's Task Force for a Drug-Free America in 2003. The task force advised House Speaker Dennis Hastert on major drug policy issues and helped author legislation regarding recreational drugs, including anti-methamphetamine legislation. Boozman was the lead author of the Stop Marketing Illegal Drugs to Minors Act, a bill that would increase penalties on criminals who design and market drugs such as candy-flavored meth for kids. He was praised by the National Association of Drug Court Professionals, earning the organization's Congressional Leadership Award in 2009. In 2006, Congress passed a Boozman-authored provision promoting an expanded role for drug courts in efforts to reduce drug abuse and recidivism.

During the 2008 presidential campaign, Boozman endorsed former Governor of Arkansas Mike Huckabee for president.

In the 109th Congress, Boozman chaired the Veterans Affairs Economic Opportunity Subcommittee, which focuses on ensuring veterans have a smooth transition to civilian life. He has used his seat on the Veterans Affairs Committee to pass legislation honoring the service and sacrifice of United States military veterans and increasing benefits to them and their families. In the 111th Congress, Boozman introduced and the House of Representatives passed the Veterans Retraining Act of 2009, which provides resources and training opportunities for unemployed veterans. The House also passed several other Boozman-authored bills, including one that creates grants to help disabled veterans adapt their homes and vehicles to meet their needs.

In May 2004, Boozman was appointed to the House Policy Committee, a committee of Republicans who vet issues and formulate legislation to address them.

Boozman was also a member of the North Atlantic Treaty Organization Parliamentary Assembly (NATO PA), an inter-parliamentary organization of legislators from the 19 member countries of NATO and 20 associate countries. He was also appointed vice-chairman of the British American Parliamentary Group, a group of American and British lawmakers who meet to discuss issues of concern and fortify the already strong alliance between the two nations.

Boozman was a member of numerous House caucuses, including the Congressional Caucus to Fight and Control Methamphetamine, the National Guard and Reserve Components Caucus, the Congressional Rural Caucus and the Congressional Sportsman's Caucus. He was also one of the founding members of the Congressional I-49 Caucus to promote completion of Interstate 49, and chaired the Congressional Caucus on the Ivory Coast and West Africa Caucus.

Congress.org's power rankings rated Boozman's power rating at 7.31, making him the 386th most powerful member out of 435.

According to the April 28, 2007, Washington Post, Boozman was told by officials in the White House about its intention to fire Bud Cummins, United States Attorney for the Eastern District of Arkansas, and replace him with Tim Griffin, an aide to Karl Rove. According to the Post, none of the Democrats in Arkansas' congressional delegation were told that Cummins was to be one of eight U.S. Attorneys to be fired. Although Boozman did not represent any counties in the Eastern District, he was informed because he was the only Republican in the state's congressional delegation.

Boozman told the Post and the Associated Press that White House officials had promised him that Griffin would be subject to Senate confirmation. Instead, Attorney General Alberto Gonzales appointed Griffin as interim U.S. Attorney, using a provision of the Patriot Act that has since been repealed due to the controversy. Boozman also said that he did not think Cummins should have been fired because he was "very well respected and has served the president well."

== U.S. Senate ==
=== Elections ===
==== 2010 ====
In 2010, Boozman did not run for reelection to the House and instead ran for the Senate seat held by incumbent two-term Democrat Blanche Lincoln, who had defeated Boozman's brother, Fay, in her first run for the seat in 1998. He won the May 2010 Republican primary and defeated Lincoln in the general election, 58% to 37%.

==== 2016 ====
Boozman won a second term in 2016, defeating former U.S. Attorney Conner Eldridge with 59.8% of the vote after winning the Republican primary with 76% of the vote. Boozman became the first Republican to be popularly elected to a second term in the Senate from Arkansas.

==== 2022 ====
On March 6, 2021, Boozman announced he would seek a third term as Senator.

In the Republican primary, Boozman faced former NFL player Jake Bequette and conservative activist Jan Morgan, who criticized his refusal to challenge the results of the 2020 presidential election and portrayed him as insufficiently conservative. Boozman was endorsed by Donald Trump, Tom Cotton, and gubernatorial candidate Sarah Huckabee Sanders, and won renomination with 58% of the vote.

He won his third term in 2022, defeating Democratic nominee Natalie James with 65.8% of the vote.

=== Term ===
Boozman began his term in the Senate in January 2011.

Boozman and Tom Cotton initially objected to the certification of the 2021 United States Electoral College vote count. After the 2021 United States Capitol attack, they voted to support it. Boozman said: "The events that transpired in Washington were not only shocking and unlawful, but represent a dark moment in our country's history that we must reckon with today and in the days to come."

In 2024, Boozman led a bipartisan Congressional delegation to France to honor the 80th anniversary of D-Day.

=== Committee assignments ===
- Commission on Security and Cooperation in Europe
- Committee on Agriculture, Nutrition, and Forestry (Chairman)
  - Subcommittee on Commodities, Risk Management, and Trade
  - Subcommittee on Conservation, Forestry, and Natural Resources
  - Subcommittee on Food and Nutrition, Specialty Crops, Organics, and Research
  - Subcommittee on Livestock, Dairy, Poultry, Local Food Systems, and Food Safety and Security
  - Subcommittee on Rural Development and Energy
- Committee on Appropriations
  - Subcommittee on Defense
  - Subcommittee on Financial Services and General Government
  - Subcommittee on Labor, Health and Human Services, Education, and Related Agencies
  - Subcommittee on Military Construction, Veterans Affairs, and Related Agencies (Chair)
  - Subcommittee on State, Foreign Operations, and Related Programs
  - Subcommittee on Transportation, Housing and Urban Development, and Related Agencies
- Committee on Environment and Public Works
  - Subcommittee on Chemical Safety, Waste Management, Environmental Justice, and Regulatory Oversight
  - Subcommittee on Fisheries, Water, and Wildlife
  - Subcommittee on Transportation and Infrastructure
- Committee on Veterans' Affairs

=== Caucus memberships ===
- Air Force Caucus (Co-Chair)
- Senate Broadband Caucus (Co-Chair)
- Congressional French Caucus (Co-Chair)
- Paper and Packaging Caucus (Co-Chair)
- Senate Recycling Caucus (Co-Chair)
- 4-H Caucus
- Border Security and Enforcement First Caucus
- International Conservation Caucus
- Congressional Caucus on Turkey and Turkish Americans
- National Guard Caucus
- National Hunger Caucus (Co-Chair)
- Republican Doctors Caucus
- Sportsmen's Caucus
- Afterschool Caucuses
- Senate Republican Conference
- Congressional Coalition on Adoption
- Rare Disease Caucus

== Political positions and votes ==
Boozman voted for legislation that would require the Food and Drug Administration (FDA) to improve safety by regulating non-corrective colored contact lenses as medical devices. President George W. Bush signed this legislation into law in 2005.

In the 111th Congress, Boozman introduced legislation (H.R. 2230) to provide tax credits for teachers and principals who work in challenging, low-income schools. He has also introduced legislation to reform the No Child Left Behind Act. One bill (H.R. 2229) would give states latitude to adopt alternate and modified standards for children with disabilities.

Other legislation that Boozman has introduced includes a bill to provide a tax credit for volunteer firefighters, a bill to require that parents be notified when a minor seeks an abortion, and a bill to create alternatives to traditional foreign aid to poor countries in sub-Saharan Africa.

The Zionist Organization of America has praised Boozman for his opposition to federal aid to Hamas.

Boozman received an 85.48% Lifetime Score from the American Conservative Union.

=== Abortion ===
Boozman opposes abortion. After Dobbs v. Jackson Women's Health Organization in June 2022, he wrote: "The Supreme Court’s decision to affirm there is no constitutional right to indiscriminately sacrifice the lives of children in their mothers' wombs is the culmination of decades of work to correct the tragic, deadly lie that unborn babies are expendable and undeserving of protection."

=== Arkansas history ===
Boozman introduced legislation in the 110th Congress calling for a study of the historic Butterfield Overland Mail Trail for the potential addition to the National Trails System. This legislation passed as part of an omnibus bill (P.L. 111-11), and was signed by President Barack Obama on March 30, 2009.

In addition to preserving the historical significance of the Butterfield Trail, Boozman supported an effort to secure the home of the U.S. Marshals Museum in Fort Smith; in January 2007, it was announced that Fort Smith would be the museum's permanent home. In the 111th Congress, Boozman introduced legislation to recognize the 225th Anniversary of the U.S. Marshals Service with a commemorative coin to be minted in 2014.

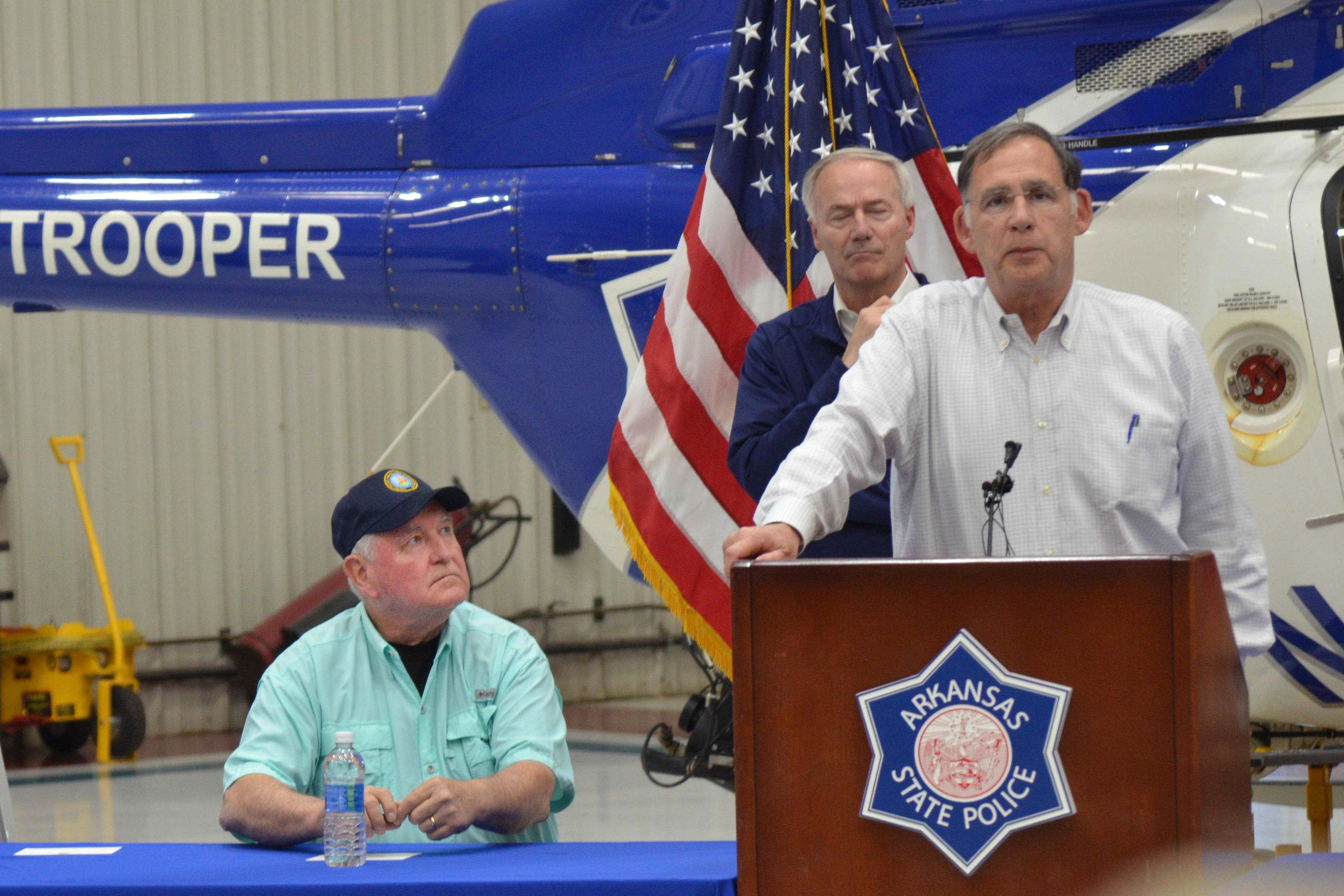
U.S. Agriculture Secretary Sonny Perdue and Arkansas Governor Asa Hutchinson listen to Boozman speak about flood damage in Arkansas in 2017

Boozman has penned three bills, each enacted into law, to name certain U.S. Post Offices in Arkansas, including naming The Harrison Post Office after former Arkansas Congressman John Paul Hammerschmidt.

=== Health care reform ===
Boozman voted against the Affordable Care Act (Obamacare) on November 7, 2009, later writing: "I am for health care reform, unfortunately, this bill does more harm than good."

=== Donald Trump ===
Boozman supported Donald Trump's 2016 presidential campaign. He voted with Trump's stated position 91.5% of the time, and voted to acquit Trump in both of his impeachment trials.

=== Gun violence and firearm laws ===
Boozman received an "A" grade from the National Rifle Association Political Victory Fund (NRA-PVF) for his support of gun rights. In May 2011, he voted to table an amendment that prohibited usage of the Patriot Act to access firearm records. In April 2013, in the wake of the Sandy Hook Elementary School shooting, Boozman was one of 46 senators to vote against a bill that would have extended background checks to all firearm transfers. He voted with 40 Republicans and five Democrats to stop the bill.

In 2016, Boozman voted against the proposed Feinstein Amendment, which sought to ban the sale of firearms to known and/or suspected terrorists, claiming that it would deprive Americans of due process.

=== Employment discrimination ===
In November 2013, Boozman was one of 32 senators (all Republican) who voted against the Employment Non-Discrimination Act, a bill that would prohibit discrimination in organizations of 15 or more employees based on sexual orientation or gender identity.

In April 2014, Boozman voted against a cloture motion for the Paycheck Fairness Act, a bill that establishes additional penalties for violations of equal pay requirements in the Fair Labor Standards Act, including a prohibition on an employer from paying a wage rate to employees of a particular sex that is lower than the rate paid to employees of the opposite sex for equal work unless such payment is made due to certain factors including but not limited to "a bona fide factor other than sex". Some groups characterized the legislation as redundant, citing the 1963 Equal Pay Act and Title VII of the 1964 Civil Rights Act as existing protections against wage discrimination based on gender or race. The Senate Republican Conference called it "the latest ploy in the Democrats' election-year playbook".

=== Civil rights ===
In September 2004, Boozman voted for a constitutional amendment banning same-sex marriage. The amendment did not pass.

In July 2006, Boozman co-introduced and voted for a constitutional amendment defining marriage as between one man and one woman. The amendment did not pass.

In April 2009, Boozman voted against the Local Law Enforcement Hate Crimes Prevention Act, which sought to define crimes committed against a person because of their sexual orientation or gender identity as hate crimes: "I opposed this legislation because it creates a new federal offense for so-called hate crimes, and adds a special class crimes potentially motivated by the victims sexual orientation, 'gender identity', or the perceived thoughts of the alleged criminal." The act passed the House.

In December 2010, Boozman voted against repealing Don't Ask, Don't Tell, claiming that the "current policy has worked well" and that "we haven't had any significant problems with it." The vote passed by a margin of 250-175, and Don't Ask, Don't Tell was repealed.

In December 2012, Boozman voted against ratifying the Convention on the Rights of Persons with Disabilities, an international human rights treaty of the United Nations intended to protect the rights and dignity of persons with disabilities. The Convention on the Rights of Persons with Disabilities sought to "promote, protect and ensure the full and equal enjoyment of all human rights and fundamental freedoms by all persons with disabilities, and to promote respect for their inherent dignity," but the convention only reached 61 of the 66 votes required for passage.

In February 2013, Boozman voted against reauthorizing the Violence Against Women Act. The bill passed by a 78–22 margin. He cited concerns "about the constitutionality of allowing tribal courts jurisdiction over non-Native Americans who are accused of committing an act of domestic violence on tribal lands or against Native Americans” as part of his opposition to the measure.

=== Veterans ===
Boozman has served on Veterans Affairs committees throughout his tenure in Congress. He served on the House Veterans' Affairs Committee including as chair of the Economic Development subcommittee and has remained on the Senate Veterans' Affairs Committee as well as chairing the Military Construction and VA subcommittee (MilConVA) on the Senate Appropriations Committee.

Boozman has been recognized by veterans service organizations for his work on behalf of veterans, including from the VFW, TAPS, MOAA, Wounded Warrior Project, and IAVA.

==== Veteran employment ====
In September 2012, Boozman voted to block advancement of the Veterans Job Corps Act of 2012. After a veterans' group claimed in a press release that Boozman had co-authored the bill based on Senator Patty Murray's and other Democrats' claim that "Boozman was on board after they added several GOP initiatives to the bill", Boozman issued a reply that he "was never consulted on the addition and not part of the negotiation process for this legislation." Boozman had not sponsored or co-sponsored the bill. The bill, which would have established a $1 billion Veterans Jobs Corps at a time when the unemployment rate for post-9/11 veterans was 10.9%, fell two votes shy of the 60 needed for passage. The legislation underwent changes related to how it would offset spending, which led Boozman to vote against it.

=== Environment ===
In 2017, Boozman was one of 22 senators to sign a letter to President Donald Trump urging him to withdraw the United States from the Paris Agreement. According to OpenSecrets, Boozman has received nearly $150,000 from oil, gas, and coal interests since 2012. He claimed that EPA regulations are creating a dirtier climate abroad and providing no gain to the United States.

Boozman wrote: "I commend President Trump for taking the appropriate steps to make a clean exit from it so we can continue to pursue an 'all-of-the-above' approach to meeting our energy needs free of the significant litigation risk created by the agreement." He added: "It is important to stress that a clean exit from the Paris climate accord will not take away the United States' seat at the table in future discussions, nor will it detract from our efforts to pursue renewable energy solutions."

=== Foreign policy ===
In March 2017, Boozman co-sponsored the Israel Anti-Boycott Act (s. 720), which made it a federal crime for Americans to encourage or participate in boycotts against Israel and Israeli settlements in the occupied Palestinian territories if protesting actions by the Israeli government.

In January 2019, Boozman was one of 11 Republican senators to vote to advance legislation intended to block President Trump's intent to lift sanctions against three Russian companies.

=== January 6 commission ===
On May 28, 2021, Boozman voted against creating a January 6 commission to investigate the 2021 United States Capitol attack.

== Electoral history ==
Year	Office	Party	Primary						General				Result	Swing
Year	Office	Party	Total	%	P.	Runoff	%	P.	Total	%	±%	P.	Result	Swing
2001	U.S. Representative	Republican	16,330	43.24%	1st	19,583	56.58%	1st	52,894	55.55%	–44.45%	1st	Won	Hold
2002	U.S. Representative	Republican							141,478	98.90%	+43.35%	1st	Won	Hold
2004	U.S. Representative	Republican							160,629	59.32%	–39.58%	1st	Won	Hold
2006	U.S. Representative	Republican							125,039	62.23%	+2.91%	1st	Won	Hold
2008	U.S. Representative	Republican							215,196	78.53%	+16.3%	1st	Won	Hold
2010	U.S. Senator	Republican	75,010	52.73%	1st				451,618	57.90%	-13.83%	1st	Won	Gain
2016	U.S. Senator	Republican	298,039	76.45%	1st				661,984	59.77%	+1.87%	1st	Won	Hold
2022	U.S. Senator	Republican	201,677	58.0%	1st				592,433	65.7%	+5.96%	1st	Won	Hold

== Personal life ==
Boozman lives in Rogers with his wife, Cathy Marley Boozman. They have three daughters. He has raised Polled Hereford cattle that were competitive in the show ring, and in bull testing at Oklahoma State University. The Boozman family is active in the 4-H program.

On April 22, 2014, Boozman underwent emergency heart surgery. In 2017, he underwent a successful followup procedure that was recommended by doctors who had been monitoring his aorta since a tear in it was surgically repaired in 2014.

John's ophthalmologist brother, Fay Winford Boozman III, co-founded the Boozman Regional Eye Clinic (now named BoozmanHof Regional Eye Clinic) with John after receiving his ophthalmology degree. Fay was elected to the Arkansas Senate in 1994 as a Republican and was nominated for the United States Senate in Arkansas in the 1998 election, losing to Democratic Congresswoman Blanche Lincoln 55% to 42%. Despite his defeat, Fay was nominated to be director of the Arkansas Health Department in 1999. Fay died in an accident on his farm in 2005, aged 58.

As of 2017, according to OpenSecrets.org, Boozman's net worth was more than $2.3 million.

U.S. House of Representatives
Preceded by Asa Hutchinson	Member of the U.S. House of Representatives from Arkansas's 3rd congressional district 2001–2011	Succeeded by Steve Womack
Party political offices
Preceded by Jim Holt	Republican nominee for U.S. Senator from Arkansas (Class 3); 2010, 2016, 2022	Most recent
U.S. Senate
Preceded by Blanche Lincoln	United States Senator (Class 3) from Arkansas; 2011–present Served alongside: Mark Pryor, Tom Cotton	Incumbent
Preceded by Debbie Stabenow	Ranking Member of the Senate Agriculture Committee; 2021–2025	Succeeded by Amy Klobuchar
Preceded by Debbie Stabenow	Chair of the Senate Agriculture Committee; 2025–present	Incumbent
U.S. order of precedence (ceremonial)
Preceded by Rand Paul	Order of precedence of the United States as United States Senator	Succeeded by Ron Johnson
Preceded by Jerry Moran	United States senators by seniority 27th	Succeeded by John Hoeven
