= United States Senate Committee on Agriculture, Nutrition, and Forestry =

Standing committee of the United States Senate

Senate Agriculture Committee
Standing committee
- Active United States Senate; 119th Congress

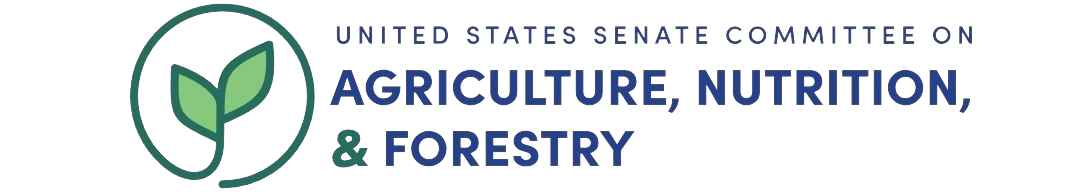

History
- Formed: December 9, 1825

Leadership
- Chair: John Boozman (R); Since January 3, 2025
- Ranking Member: Amy Klobuchar (D); Since January 3, 2025

Structure
- Political parties: Majority (12): Republican (12); Minority (11): Democratic (11)

Jurisdiction
- Policy areas: Agriculture, Crop insurance, Farm bill, Farm credit, Food stamps, Food inspection, Forestry, Home economics, National forests, National grasslands, Nutrition, Rural development, Rural electrification, Soil conservation, Soil survey, Water conservation, Watersheds, Wilderness areas
- Oversight authority: Agricultural Marketing Service, Agricultural Research Service, Animal and Plant Health Inspection Service, Commodity Credit Corporation, Commodity Futures Trading Commission, Department of Agriculture, Economic Research Service, Farm Credit Administration, Federal Agricultural Mortgage Corporation, Food and Nutrition Service, Food Safety and Inspection Service, Foreign Agricultural Service, National Agricultural Statistics Service, National Institute of Food and Agriculture, Natural Resources Conservation Service, United States Forest Service, USDA Rural Development
- House counterpart: Committee on Agriculture

Subcommittees
- Commodities, Risk Management, and Trade; Rural Development and Energy; Conservation, Forestry, and Natural Resources; Nutrition, Agricultural Research, and Specialty Crops; Livestock, Marketing, and Agriculture Security

Meeting place
- 328A Russell Senate Office Building

Website
- agriculture.senate.gov

Rules
- Rule XXV.1.(a), Standing Rules of the Senate; Committee Rules

The Committee on Agriculture, Nutrition, and Forestry is a committee of the United States Senate empowered with legislative oversight of all matters relating to the nation's agriculture industry, farming programs, forestry and logging, and legislation relating to nutrition, home economics, and rural development.

The current chair is Republican John Boozman of Arkansas, and the ranking member is Democrat Amy Klobuchar of Minnesota.

== History ==
Founded in 1825 the committee was formed at the request of Senator William Findlay from Pennsylvania. Arguing that agriculture was as important to national progress as commerce and manufacturing, Findlay succeeded in persuading the full Senate to divide the Committee on Commerce and Manufactures into two separate committees. The Committee on Agriculture was formed by resolution on December 9, 1825.

During the first four decades of the existence of this committee, the need for it was repeatedly called into question. At that time in America, nearly two-thirds of the population was directly engaged in agriculture. As such, issues related to agriculture overlapped with areas covered by other committees and were often referred to those committees instead of the Agriculture Committee.

Following a debate over the necessity of various committees to have need of the services of a dedicated clerk, a Special Committee was formed to investigate ways to "reduce the number and increase the efficiency of the committees." On February 17, 1857, the Special Committee submitted a plan of reorganization for the committees that did not include the Agriculture Committee. During a special session of the Senate, on March 5, 1857, the Senate approved the Special Committees recommendations and the Committee on Agriculture was dissolved.

In 1862, the country was embroiled in the Civil War, a large influx of immigrants was occurring and the nation was moving towards industrialization. That year, President Abraham Lincoln signed the Organic Act recreating the Department of Agriculture.

It became the Committee on Agriculture and Forestry in 1884, a reflection of the growing importance of forests to the country's needs. It was renamed again to the Committee on Agriculture, Nutrition, and Forestry in 1977. Nutrition was added to the name after the Food and Agriculture Act of 1977 directed the Department of Agriculture to "conduct more human nutrition research, establish a national nutrition education program and develop a system to monitor America's nutritional status".

== Jurisdiction ==
In accordance of Rule XXV of the United States Senate, all proposed legislation, messages, petitions, memorials, and other matters relating to the following subjects are referred to the Agriculture Committee:

1. Agricultural economics and research.
2. Agricultural extension services and experiment stations.
3. Agricultural production, marketing, and stabilization of prices.
4. Agriculture and agricultural commodities.
5. Animal industry and diseases.
6. Crop insurance and soil conservation.
7. Farm credit and farm security.
8. Food from fresh waters.
9. Food stamp programs.
10. Forestry, and forest reserves and wilderness areas other than those created from the public domain.
11. Home economics.
12. Human nutrition.
13. Inspection of livestock, meat, and agricultural products.
14. Pests and pesticides.
15. Plant industry, soils, and agricultural engineering.
16. Rural development, rural electrification, and watersheds.
17. School nutrition programs.

The Agriculture Committee is also charged "to study and review, on a comprehensive basis, matters relating to food, nutrition, and hunger, both in the United States and in foreign countries, and rural affairs, and report thereon from time to time."

== Members, 119th Congress ==
Majority	Minority
John Boozman, Arkansas, Chair; Mitch McConnell, Kentucky; John Hoeven, North Dakota; Joni Ernst, Iowa; Cindy Hyde-Smith, Mississippi; Roger Marshall, Kansas; Tommy Tuberville, Alabama; Jim Justice, West Virginia (from January 14, 2025); Chuck Grassley, Iowa; John Thune, South Dakota; Deb Fischer, Nebraska; Jerry Moran, Kansas	Amy Klobuchar, Minnesota, Ranking Member; Michael Bennet, Colorado; Tina Smith, Minnesota; Dick Durbin, Illinois; Cory Booker, New Jersey; Ben Ray Luján, New Mexico; Raphael Warnock, Georgia; Peter Welch, Vermont; John Fetterman, Pennsylvania; Adam Schiff, California; Elissa Slotkin, Michigan

== Subcommittees ==
Subcommittees	Chair	Ranking members
Commodities, Derivatives, Risk Management, and Trade	Cindy Hyde-Smith (R-MS)	Cory Booker (D-NJ)
Conservation, Forestry, Natural Resources, and Biotechnology	Roger Marshall (R-KS)	Michael Bennet (D-CO)
Livestock, Dairy, Poultry, and Food Safety	John Hoeven (R-ND)	Elissa Slotkin (D-MI)
Food and Nutrition, Specialty Crops, Organics, and Research	Mitch McConnell (R-KY)	John Fetterman (D-PA)
Rural Development, Energy, and Credit	Joni Ernst (R-IA)	Peter Welch (D-VT)

== Leadership ==
The committee, under its various names, has been chaired by the below.

=== Committee on Agriculture, 1825–1857 ===
Chairs
Name	Party	State	Start	End
William Findlay	Jacksonian	Pennsylvania	1825	1826
Calvin Willey	Adams	Connecticut	1826	1827
John Branch	Jacksonian	North Carolina	1827	1828
Ephraim Bateman	Adams	New Jersey	1828	1829
Charles Bouligny	Adams	Louisiana	1829	
William Marks	Anti-Jackson	Pennsylvania	1829	1831
Horatio Seymour	Anti-Jackson	Vermont	1831	1833
Bedford Brown	Jacksonian	North Carolina	1833	1836
John Page	Jacksonian	New Hampshire	1836	1837
Perry Smith	Democratic	Connecticut	1837	1839
Alexander Mouton	Democratic	Louisiana	1839	1841
Lewis Linn	Democratic	Missouri	1841	1843
William Upham	Whig	Vermont	1843	1845
Daniel Sturgeon	Democratic	Pennsylvania	1845	1851
Presley Spruance	Whig	Delaware	1851	
Pierre Soulé	Democratic	Louisiana	1851	1853
Philip Allen	Democratic	Rhode Island	1853	1857

Ranking members
Name	Party	State	Start	End
Levi Woodbury	Jacksonian	New Hampshire	1825	1826
Ephraim Bateman	Adams	New Jersey	1826	1827
Calvin Willey	Adams	Connecticut	1827	1828
William Marks	Adams	Pennsylvania	1828	1829
John McLean	Jacksonian	Pennsylvania	1829	1830
Bedford Brown	Democratic	North Carolina	1830	1831
Gabriel Moore	Jacksonian	Alabama	1831	1832
John Robinson	Jacksonian	Illinois	1832	1833
Silas Wright	Jacksonian	Illinois	1833	1834
John Robinson	Jacksonian	Illinois	1834	1835
Thomas Morris	Jacksonian	Ohio	1835	1836
Samuel McKean	Jacksonian	Pennsylvania	1836	1839
Bedford Brown	Democratic	North Carolina	1839	1840
Daniel Sturgeon	Democratic	Pennsylvania	1840	1841
Albert White	Whig	Indiana	1841	1842
Perry Smith	Democratic	Connecticut	1842	1843
James Semple	Democratic	Illinois	1843	1845
Hopkins Turney	Democratic	Tennessee	1845	1847
Charles Atherton	Democratic	New Hampshire	1847	1849
Isaac Walker	Democratic	Wisconsin	1849	1851
Presley Spruance	Whig	Delaware	1851	1852
Benjamin Wade	Whig	Ohio	1852	1853
John Thomson	Democratic	New Jersey	1853	1857

=== Committee on Agriculture, 1863–1884 ===
Chairs
Name	Party	State	Start	End
John Sherman	Republican	Ohio	1863	1864
James Lane	Republican	Kansas	1864	1865
John Sherman	Republican	Ohio	1865	1867
Simon Cameron	Republican	Pennsylvania	1867	1871
Oliver Morton	Republican	Indiana	1871	1872
Frederick Frelinghuysen	Republican	New Jersey	1872	1877
Algernon Paddock	Republican	Nebraska	1877	1879
John Johnston	Democratic	Virginia	1879	1881
William Mahone	Readjuster/Republican	Virginia	1881	1883
Warner Miller	Republican	New York	1883	1884

Ranking members
Name	Party	State	Start	End
Lazarus Powell	Democratic	Kentucky	1863	1865
James Guthrie	Democratic	Kentucky	1865	1868
Thomas McCreery	Democratic	Kentucky	1868	1871
Henry Davis	Democratic	West Virginia	1871	1873
George Dennis	Democratic	Maryland	1873	1875
Henry Davis	Democratic	West Virginia	1875	1879
Algernon Paddock	Republican	Nebraska	1879	1881
Henry Davis	Democratic	West Virginia	1881	1883
James George	Democratic	Mississippi	1883	1884

=== Committee on Agriculture and Forestry, 1884–1977 ===
Chairs
Names	Party	State	Start	End
Warner Miller	Republican	New York	1884	1887
Thomas Palmer	Republican	Michigan	1887	1889
Algernon Paddock	Republican	Nebraska	1889	1893
James George	Democratic	Mississippi	1893	1895
Redfield Proctor	Republican	Vermont	1895	1908
Henry Hansbrough	Republican	North Dakota	1908	1909
Jonathan Dolliver	Republican	Iowa	1909	1910
Henry Burnham	Republican	New Hampshire	1911	1913
Thomas Gore	Democratic	Oklahoma	1913	1919
Asle Gronna	Republican	North Dakota	1919	1921
George Norris	Republican	Nebraska	1921	1926
Charles McNary	Republican	Oregon	1926	1933
Ellison Smith	Democratic	South Carolina	1933	1944
Elmer Thomas	Democratic	Oklahoma	1944	1947
Arthur Capper	Republican	Kansas	1947	1949
Elmer Thomas	Democratic	Oklahoma	1949	1951
Allen Ellender	Democratic	Louisiana	1951	1953
George Aiken	Republican	Vermont	1953	1955
Allen Ellender	Democratic	Louisiana	1955	1971
Herman Talmadge	Democratic	Georgia	1971	1977

Ranking members
Name	Party	State	Start	End
James George	Democratic	Mississippi	1884	1893
James McMillan	Republican	Michigan	1893	1895
James George	Democratic	Mississippi	1895	1898
William Bate	Democratic	Tennessee	1898	1905
Hernando Money	Democratic	Mississippi	1905	1911
John Bankhead	Democratic	Alabama	1911	1913
Francis Warren	Republican	Wyoming	1913	1919
Thomas Gore	Democratic	Oklahoma	1919	1921
Ellison Smith	Democratic	South Carolina	1921	1933
George Norris	Republican	Nebraska	1933	1943
Arthur Capper	Republican	Kansas	1943	1947
Elmer Thomas	Democratic	Oklahoma	1947	1949
George Aiken	Republican	Vermont	1949	1953
Allen Ellender	Democratic	Louisiana	1953	1955
George Aiken	Republican	Vermont	1955	1971
Jack Miller	Republican	Iowa	1971	1973
Carl Curtis	Republican	Nebraska	1973	1975
Bob Dole	Republican	Kansas	1975	1977

=== Committee on Agriculture, Nutrition, and Forestry, 1977–present ===
Chairs
Name	Party	State	Start	End
Herman Talmadge	Democratic	Georgia	1977	1981
Jesse Helms	Republican	North Carolina	1981	1987
Patrick Leahy	Democratic	Vermont	1987	1995
Dick Lugar	Republican	Indiana	1995	2001
Tom Harkin	Democratic	Iowa	2001	
Dick Lugar	Republican	Indiana	2001	
Tom Harkin	Democratic	Iowa	2001	2003
Thad Cochran	Republican	Mississippi	2003	2005
Saxby Chambliss	Republican	Georgia	2005	2007
Tom Harkin	Democratic	Iowa	2007	2009
Blanche Lincoln	Democratic	Arkansas	2009	2011
Debbie Stabenow	Democratic	Michigan	2011	2015
Pat Roberts	Republican	Kansas	2015	2021
Debbie Stabenow	Democratic	Michigan	2021	2025
John Boozman	Republican	Arkansas	2025	present

Ranking members
Name	Party	State	Start	End
Bob Dole	Republican	Kansas	1977	1979
Jesse Helms	Republican	North Carolina	1979	1981
Dee Huddleston	Democratic	Nebraska	1981	1985
Edward Zorinsky	Democratic	Nebraska	1985	1987
Jesse Helms	Republican	North Carolina	1987 (Note: Helms briefly held the ranking position on the Senate Agriculture Committee while he attempted to succeed Lugar on the Senate Foreign Relations Committee. Lugar kept the latter position with the support of the committee's Republicans until a vote by the full Senate Republican Conference overruled them and installed Helms at SFRC.)	
Dick Lugar	Republican	Indiana	1987	1995
Patrick Leahy	Democratic	Vermont	1995	1997
Tom Harkin	Democratic	Iowa	1997	2001
Thad Cochran	Republican	Mississippi	2001	2003
Tom Harkin	Democratic	Iowa	2003	2007
Saxby Chambliss	Republican	Georgia	2007	2011
Pat Roberts	Republican	Kansas	2011	2013
Thad Cochran	Republican	Mississippi	2013	2015
Debbie Stabenow	Democratic	Michigan	2015	2021
John Boozman	Republican	Arkansas	2021	2025
Amy Klobuchar	Democratic	Minnesota	2025	present

== Historical committee rosters ==
=== 118th Congress ===
Majority	Minority
Debbie Stabenow, Michigan, Chair; Sherrod Brown, Ohio; Amy Klobuchar, Minnesota; Michael Bennet, Colorado; Kirsten Gillibrand, New York; Tina Smith, Minnesota; Dick Durbin, Illinois; Cory Booker, New Jersey; Ben Ray Luján, New Mexico; Raphael Warnock, Georgia; Peter Welch, Vermont; John Fetterman, Pennsylvania	John Boozman, Arkansas, Ranking Member; Mitch McConnell, Kentucky; John Hoeven, North Dakota; Joni Ernst, Iowa; Cindy Hyde-Smith, Mississippi; Roger Marshall, Kansas; Tommy Tuberville, Alabama; Mike Braun, Indiana; Chuck Grassley, Iowa; John Thune, South Dakota; Deb Fischer, Nebraska

Subcommittees

Subcommittees	Chair	Ranking members
Commodities, Risk Management and Trade	Tina Smith (D-MN)	Cindy Hyde-Smith (R-MS)
Conservation, Climate, Forestry, and Natural Resources	Michael Bennet (D-CO)	Roger Marshall (R-KS)
Livestock, Dairy, Poultry, Local Food Systems, and Food Safety and Security	Kirsten Gillibrand (D-NY)	John Hoeven (R-ND)
Food and Nutrition, Specialty Crops, Organics, and Research	John Fetterman (D-PA)	Mike Braun (R-IN)
Rural Development and Energy	Peter Welch (D-VT)	Tommy Tuberville (R-AL)

=== 117th Congress ===
Majority	Minority
Debbie Stabenow, Michigan, Chair; Patrick Leahy, Vermont; Sherrod Brown, Ohio; Amy Klobuchar, Minnesota; Michael Bennet, Colorado; Kirsten Gillibrand, New York; Tina Smith, Minnesota; Dick Durbin, Illinois; Cory Booker, New Jersey; Ben Ray Luján, New Mexico; Raphael Warnock, Georgia	John Boozman, Arkansas, Ranking Member; Mitch McConnell, Kentucky; John Hoeven, North Dakota; Joni Ernst, Iowa; Cindy Hyde-Smith, Mississippi; Mike Braun, Indiana; Chuck Grassley, Iowa; John Thune, South Dakota; Deb Fischer, Nebraska; Roger Marshall, Kansas; Tommy Tuberville, Alabama

Subcommittees

Subcommittees	Chair	Ranking members
Commodities, Markets and Trade	Raphael Warnock (D-GA)	John Hoeven (R-ND)
Conservation, Forestry and Natural Resources	Michael Bennet (D-CO)	Roger Marshall (R-KS)
Livestock, Dairy, Poultry, Local Food Systems, and Food Safety and Security	Kirsten Gillibrand (D-NY)	Cindy Hyde-Smith (R-MS)
Food and Nutrition, Specialty Crops, Organics, and Research	Cory Booker (D-NJ)	Mike Braun (R-IN)
Rural Development and Energy	Tina Smith (D-MN)	Joni Ernst (R-IA)

=== 116th Congress ===
Majority	Minority
Pat Roberts, Kansas, Chair; Mitch McConnell, Kentucky; John Boozman, Arkansas; John Hoeven, North Dakota; Joni Ernst, Iowa; Cindy Hyde-Smith, Mississippi; Mike Braun, Indiana; David Perdue, Georgia (until January 6, 2020); Chuck Grassley, Iowa; John Thune, South Dakota; Deb Fischer, Nebraska; Kelly Loeffler, Georgia (from January 6, 2020)	Debbie Stabenow, Michigan, Ranking Member; Patrick Leahy, Vermont; Sherrod Brown, Ohio; Amy Klobuchar, Minnesota; Michael Bennet, Colorado; Kirsten Gillibrand, New York; Bob Casey, Pennsylvania; Tina Smith, Minnesota; Dick Durbin, Illinois

Subcommittees

Subcommittees	Chair	Ranking members
Commodities, Markets and Trade	John Boozman (R-AR)	Sherrod Brown (D-OH)
Conservation, Forestry and Natural Resources	Mike Braun (R-IN)	Michael Bennet (D-CO)
Livestock, Marketing and Agriculture Security	Cindy Hyde-Smith (R-MS)	Kirsten Gillibrand (D-NY)
Nutrition, Agricultural Research and Specialty Crops	Deb Fischer (R-NE)	Bob Casey Jr. (D-PA)
Rural Development and Energy	Joni Ernst (R-IA)	Tina Smith (D-MN)

=== 115th Congress ===
Majority	Minority
Pat Roberts, Kansas, Chair; Thad Cochran, Mississippi (until April 1, 2018); Mitch McConnell, Kentucky; John Boozman, Arkansas; John Hoeven, North Dakota; Joni Ernst, Iowa; Chuck Grassley, Iowa; John Thune, South Dakota; Steve Daines, Montana; David Perdue, Georgia; Deb Fischer, Nebraska; Cindy Hyde-Smith, Mississippi (from April 10, 2018)	Debbie Stabenow, Michigan, Ranking Member; Patrick Leahy, Vermont; Sherrod Brown, Ohio; Amy Klobuchar, Minnesota; Michael Bennet, Colorado; Kirsten Gillibrand, New York; Joe Donnelly, Indiana; Heidi Heitkamp, North Dakota; Bob Casey, Pennsylvania; Chris Van Hollen, Maryland (until January 2018); Tina Smith, Minnesota (since January 2018)

Subcommittees

Subcommittees	Chair	Ranking members
Commodities, Markets and Trade	John Boozman (R-AR)	Heidi Heitkamp (D-ND)
Conservation, Forestry and Natural Resources	Steve Daines (R-MT)	Michael Bennet (D-CO)
Livestock, Marketing and Agriculture Security	David Perdue (R-GA)	Kirsten Gillibrand (D-NY)
Nutrition, Agricultural Research and Specialty Crops	Luther Strange (R-AL)	Bob Casey Jr. (D-PA)
Rural Development and Energy	Joni Ernst (R-IA)	Chris Van Hollen (D-MD)

=== 114th Congress ===
Majority	Minority
Pat Roberts, Kansas, Chair; Thad Cochran, Mississippi; Mitch McConnell, Kentucky; John Boozman, Arkansas; John Hoeven, North Dakota; David Perdue, Georgia; Joni Ernst, Iowa; Thom Tillis, North Carolina; Ben Sasse, Nebraska; Chuck Grassley, Iowa; John Thune, South Dakota	Debbie Stabenow, Michigan, Ranking Member; Patrick Leahy, Vermont; Sherrod Brown, Ohio; Amy Klobuchar, Minnesota; Michael Bennet, Colorado; Kirsten Gillibrand, New York; Joe Donnelly, Indiana; Heidi Heitkamp, North Dakota; Bob Casey, Pennsylvania

Subcommittees

Subcommittees	Chair	Ranking members
Commodities, Markets and Trade	John Boozman (R-AR)	Heidi Heitkamp (D-ND)
Conservation, Forestry and Natural Resources	David Perdue (R-GA)	Michael Bennet (D-CO)
Livestock, Marketing and Agriculture Security	Ben Sasse (R-NE)	Kirsten Gillibrand (D-NY)
Nutrition, Agricultural Research and Specialty Crops	John Hoeven (R-ND)	Bob Casey Jr. (D-PA)
Rural Development and Energy	Joni Ernst (R-IA)	Chris Van Hollen (D-MD)

=== 113th Congress ===
Majority	Minority
Debbie Stabenow, Michigan, Chair; Patrick Leahy, Vermont; Tom Harkin, Iowa; Max Baucus, Montana; Sherrod Brown, Ohio; Amy Klobuchar, Minnesota; Michael Bennet, Colorado; Kirsten Gillibrand, New York; Joe Donnelly, Indiana; Heidi Heitkamp, North Dakota; Bob Casey, Pennsylvania	Thad Cochran, Mississippi, Ranking Member; Mitch McConnell, Kentucky; Pat Roberts, Kansas; Saxby Chambliss, Georgia; John Boozman, Arkansas; John Hoeven, North Dakota; Mike Johanns, Nebraska; Chuck Grassley, Iowa; John Thune, South Dakota

Subcommittees

Subcommittees	Chair	Ranking members
Commodities, Markets and Trade	Joe Donnelly (D-IN)	Saxby Chambliss (R-GA)
Conservation, Forestry and Natural Resources	Michael Bennet (D-CO)	John Boozman (R-AR)
Livestock, Marketing and Agriculture Security	Kirsten Gillibrand (D-NY)	Pat Roberts (R-KS)
Nutrition, Agricultural Research and Specialty Crops	Bob Casey Jr. (D-PA)	John Hoeven (R-ND)
Rural Development and Energy	Heidi Heitkamp (D-ND)	Mike Johanns (R-NE)

=== 112th Congress ===
Majority	Minority
Debbie Stabenow, Michigan, Chair; Amy Klobuchar, Minnesota; Michael Bennet, Colorado; Sherrod Brown, Ohio; Bob Casey, Pennsylvania; Kirsten Gillibrand, New York; Ben Nelson, Nebraska; Tom Harkin, Iowa; Patrick Leahy, Vermont; Max Baucus, Montana; Kent Conrad, North Dakota	Pat Roberts, Kansas, Ranking Member; Mike Johanns, Nebraska; Richard Lugar, Indiana; Mitch McConnell, Kentucky; Chuck Grassley, Iowa; Thad Cochran, Mississippi; John Thune, South Dakota; John Boozman, Arkansas; John Hoeven, North Dakota; Saxby Chambliss, Georgia

Subcommittees

Subcommittees	Chair	Ranking members
Commodities, Markets, Trade, and Risk Management	Ben Nelson (D-NE)	Saxby Chambliss (R-GA)
Conservation, Forestry and Natural Resources	Michael Bennet (D-CO)	John Boozman (R-AR)
Livestock, Dairy, Poultry, Marketing, and Agriculture Security	Kirsten Gillibrand (D-NY)	Mike Johanns (R-NE)
Nutrition, Specialty Crops, Food, and Agricultural Research	Bob Casey Jr. (D-PA)	Richard G. Lugar (R-IN)
Jobs, Rural Economic Growth, and Energy Innovation	Sherrod Brown (D-OH)	John Thune (R-SD)

=== 111th Congress ===
Majority	Minority
Blanche Lincoln, Arkansas, Chair; Tom Harkin, Iowa; Patrick Leahy, Vermont; Kent Conrad, North Dakota; Max Baucus, Montana; Debbie Stabenow, Michigan; Ben Nelson, Nebraska; Sherrod Brown, Ohio; Bob Casey, Pennsylvania; Amy Klobuchar, Minnesota; Michael Bennet, Colorado; Kirsten Gillibrand, New York	Saxby Chambliss, Georgia, Ranking Member; Richard Lugar, Indiana; Thad Cochran, Mississippi; Mitch McConnell, Kentucky; Pat Roberts, Kansas; Mike Johanns, Nebraska; Chuck Grassley, Iowa; John Thune, South Dakota; John Cornyn, Texas

=== 110th Congress ===
Majority	Minority
Tom Harkin, Iowa, Chair; Patrick Leahy, Vermont; Kent Conrad, North Dakota; Max Baucus, Montana; Blanche Lincoln, Arkansas; Debbie Stabenow, Michigan; Ben Nelson, Nebraska; Ken Salazar, Colorado; Sherrod Brown, Ohio; Bob Casey, Pennsylvania; Amy Klobuchar, Minnesota	Saxby Chambliss, Georgia, Ranking Member; Richard Lugar, Indiana; Thad Cochran, Mississippi; Mitch McConnell, Kentucky; Pat Roberts, Kansas; Lindsey Graham, South Carolina; Norm Coleman, Minnesota; Mike Crapo, Idaho; John Thune, South Dakota; Chuck Grassley, Iowa

== See also ==
- List of United States Senate committees
- United States House Committee on Agriculture (House counterpart)
