= United States Senate Agriculture Subcommittee on Livestock, Dairy, Poultry, and Food Safety =

The U.S. Senate Agriculture Subcommittee on Livestock, Dairy, Poultry, and Food Safety is one of five subcommittees of the Senate Committee on Agriculture, Nutrition, and Forestry.

This subcommittee has jurisdiction over legislation on foreign agricultural trade, foreign market development, as well as agriculture product promotion and domestic marketing programs. It oversees international commodity agreements and export controls on agricultural commodities, foreign assistance programs and Food for Peace, marketing orders, inspection and certification of meat, flowers, fruit, vegetables and livestock.

== Name changes ==
The subcommittee was renamed for the 119th United States Congress (2025). It was previously:

- 117th–118th Congresses: Subcommittee on Livestock, Dairy, Poultry, Local Food Systems, and Food Safety and Security
- 115th–116th Congresses: Subcommittee on Livestock, Marketing and Agriculture Security
- 112th–114th Congresses: Subcommittee on Livestock, Dairy, Poultry, Marketing and Agriculture Security
- Prior to 112th Congress: Subcommittee on Domestic and Foreign Marketing, Inspection, and Plant and Animal Health

== Members, 119th Congress ==
Majority	Minority
John Hoeven, North Dakota, Chair; John Thune, South Dakota; Deb Fischer, Nebraska; Joni Ernst, Iowa; Cindy Hyde-Smith, Mississippi; Jim Justice, West Virginia	Elissa Slotkin, Michigan, Ranking Member; Peter Welsh, Vermont; Tina Smith, Minnesota; Dick Durbin, Illinois; Cory Booker, New Jersey
Ex officio
John Boozman, Arkansas	Amy Klobuchar, Minnesota

== Historical membership rosters ==
=== 118th Congress ===
Majority	Minority
Kirsten Gillibrand, New York, Chair; Peter Welch, Vermont; Ben Ray Luján, New Mexico; Dick Durbin, Illinois; Cory Booker, New Jersey; Sherrod Brown, Ohio	John Hoeven, North Dakota, Ranking Member; Cindy Hyde-Smith, Mississippi; Roger Marshall, Kansas; Deb Fischer, Nebraska; John Thune, South Dakota
Ex officio
Debbie Stabenow, Michigan	John Boozman, Arkansas
