= United States Senate Agriculture Subcommittee on Rural Development, Energy, and Credit =

The U.S. Senate Agriculture Subcommittee on Rural Development, Energy, and Credit is one of five subcommittees of the U.S. Senate Committee on Agriculture, Nutrition and Forestry.

== Name changes ==
The subcommittee was renamed for the 119th United States Congress (2025).

It was formerly named:

- 115th–118th Congresses: Subcommittee on Rural Development and Energy
- 112th-114th Congresses: Subcommittee on Jobs, Rural Economic Growth and Energy Innovation
- Prior to 112th Congress: Subcommittee on Energy, Science, and Technology

== Jurisdiction ==
This subcommittee has jurisdiction over legislation involving renewable energy production and energy efficiency improvement on farms and ranches and in rural communities; food and agricultural research, education, economics and extension; innovation in the use of agricultural commodities and materials.

== Members, 119th Congress ==
Majority	Minority
Joni Ernst, Iowa, Chair; Tommy Tuberville, Alabama; Chuck Grassley, Iowa; Deb Fischer, Nebraska; Jerry Moran, Kansas; Mitch McConnell, Kentucky	Peter Welch, Vermont, Ranking Member; Tina Smith, Minnesota; Michael Bennet, Colorado; Raphael Warnock, Georgia; Ben Ray Luján, New Mexico
Ex officio
John Boozman, Arkansas	Amy Klobuchar, Minnesota

== Historical membership rosters ==
=== 118th Congress ===
Majority	Minority
Peter Welch, Vermont, Chair; Amy Klobuchar, Minnesota; Ben Ray Luján, New Mexico; Tina Smith, Minnesota; Michael Bennet, Colorado; Dick Durbin, Illinois	Tommy Tuberville, Alabama, Ranking Member; Joni Ernst, Iowa; Chuck Grassley, Iowa; Deb Fischer, Nebraska; Mike Braun, Indiana
Ex officio
Debbie Stabenow, Michigan	John Boozman, Arkansas
