= Gunner DeLay =

American politician

Member of the Arkansas Senate from the 11th district
- In office January 11, 1999 – January 13, 2003
- Preceded by: Peggy Jeffries
- Succeeded by: Tim Wooldridge

Member of the Arkansas House of Representatives from the 12th district
- In office January 13, 1997 – January 11, 1999
- Preceded by: B. G. Hendrix
- Succeeded by: Jake Files

Member of the Arkansas House of Representatives from the 14th district
- In office January 9, 1995 – January 13, 1997
- Preceded by: Buddy Blair
- Succeeded by: W. K. "Mac" McGehee Jr.

Personal details
- Born: June 14, 1963 (age 63) Fort Smith, Arkansas
- Party: Republican

Gunner DeLay (born June 14, 1963) is an American politician who served in the Arkansas House of Representatives from 1995 to 1999 and in the Arkansas Senate from the 11th district from 1999 to 2003.
