= Amy Klobuchar =

Governor-elect of Minnesota

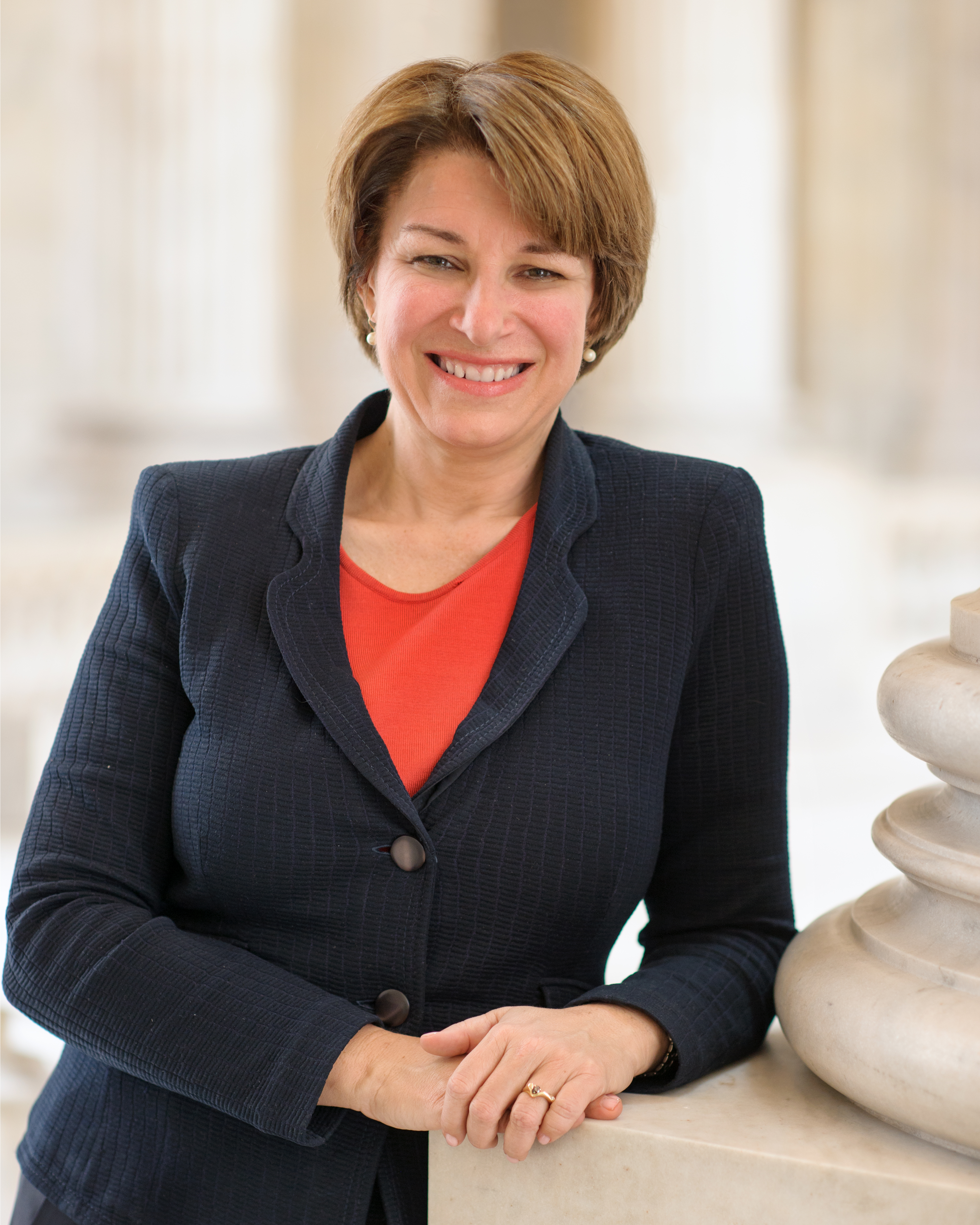
- Official portrait, 2013

Governor-elect of Minnesota
- Assuming office January 4, 2027
- Lieutenant: Ben Schierer (elect)
- Succeeding: Tim Walz

United States Senator from Minnesota
- Incumbent
- Assumed office January 3, 2007 Serving with Tina Smith
- Preceded by: Mark Dayton
Senate positions
Ranking Member of the Senate Agriculture Committee
Incumbent
Assumed office January 3, 2025
| Preceded by | John Boozman |
Chair of the Senate Democratic Steering and Policy Committee
Incumbent
Assumed office January 3, 2025
| Leader | Chuck Schumer |
| Vice Chair | Jeanne Shaheen |
| Preceded by | Debbie Stabenow (Policy and Communications) |
Chair of the Senate Rules Committee
In office February 3, 2021 – January 3, 2025
| Preceded by | Roy Blunt |
| Succeeded by | Mitch McConnell |
Chair of the Senate Democratic Steering Committee
In office January 3, 2015 (Note: From January 3, 2015 to January 3, 2017, Klobuchar was Chair of the Steering and Outreach Committee. Steering and Outreach were then split into two separate chairs; with Bernie Sanders as Chair of Outreach.) – January 3, 2025
| Leader | Harry Reid; Chuck Schumer |
| Vice Chair | Jeanne Shaheen |
| Preceded by | Mark Begich |
| Succeeded by | Herself (Steering and Policy) |

County Attorney of Hennepin County
- In office January 5, 1999 – January 3, 2007
- Preceded by: Michael Freeman
- Succeeded by: Michael Freeman

Personal details
- Born: Amy Jean Klobuchar; May 25, 1960 (age 66) Plymouth, Minnesota, U.S.
- Party: Democratic (DFL)
- Spouse: John Bessler (m. 1993)
- Children: 1
- Relatives: Jim Klobuchar (father)
- Education: Yale University (BA); University of Chicago (JD)
- Website: Senate website Campaign website
- Klobuchar's voice Klobuchar supporting a bipartisan January 6 commission. Recorded May 28, 2021

Amy Jean Klobuchar (/ˈkloʊbəʃɑːr/ KLOH-bə-shar; born May 25, 1960) is an American politician and lawyer who is the governor-elect of Minnesota. Since 2007, she has served as a United States senator from Minnesota. A member of the Minnesota Democratic–Farmer–Labor Party (DFL), Minnesota's affiliate of the Democratic Party, she served from 1999 to 2007 as county attorney of Hennepin County, Minnesota.

Born in Plymouth, Minnesota, Klobuchar graduated from Yale University and the University of Chicago Law School. She was a partner at two Minneapolis law firms before being elected county attorney of Hennepin County in 1998, making her responsible for all criminal prosecution in Minnesota's most populous county. Klobuchar was first elected to the Senate in 2006, succeeding Mark Dayton to become Minnesota's first elected female United States senator. She became Minnesota's senior senator in 2009, when Norm Coleman left the Senate following his defeat. She was reelected by a landslide in 2012, winning 85 of the state's 87 counties, before being reelected again in 2018. Klobuchar's political positions align with modern liberalism. She has focused on healthcare reform, consumer protection, abortion rights, agriculture, and climate change.

On February 10, 2019, Klobuchar announced her candidacy for the Democratic nomination in the 2020 United States presidential election; on March 2, 2020, she suspended her campaign and endorsed Joe Biden. In 2021, she became the chair of the Senate Rules Committee. She was reelected to a fourth Senate term in 2024, defeating Republican nominee Royce White. In January 2026, she announced her candidacy for governor of Minnesota after incumbent Governor Tim Walz withdrew from the race. She won the DFL nomination and defeated Republican nominee Lisa Demuth in the general election, becoming the first woman elected governor of Minnesota.

== Early life and education ==
Klobuchar was born in Plymouth, Minnesota, the daughter of Rose (née Heuberger) and Jim Klobuchar. Her mother taught second grade until she retired at age 70. Her father was a sportswriter and columnist for the Star Tribune. He was of Slovene descent and her mother of German-Swiss ancestry.

Klobuchar's parents divorced when she was 15. The divorce took a toll on the family; her relationship with her father was not fully restored until he quit drinking in the 1990s.

She attended public schools in Plymouth and was valedictorian at Wayzata High School, where she was also class treasurer and secretary. She received her Bachelor of Arts magna cum laude in political science in 1982 from Yale University. While at Yale, Klobuchar spent time as an intern for former vice president and former Minnesota senator Walter Mondale. Her senior thesis, Uncovering the Dome, a 250-page history of the ten years of politics surrounding the building of the Hubert H. Humphrey Metrodome in Minneapolis, was published by Waveland Press in 1986. After Yale, Klobuchar enrolled at the University of Chicago Law School, where she served as an associate editor of the University of Chicago Law Review and earned her J.D. with high honors in 1985.

== Early career ==
After law school, Klobuchar worked as a corporate lawyer. In time, she became a partner at the Minnesota law firms Dorsey & Whitney and Gray Plant Mooty, where she specialized in "regulatory work in telecommunications law". Her first foray into the political sphere came after she gave birth and was forced to leave the hospital 24 hours later, a situation exacerbated because her daughter, Abigail, was born with a disorder that prevented her from swallowing. The experience led Klobuchar to appear before the Minnesota Legislature, advocating for a bill guaranteeing new mothers a 48-hour hospital stay. Minnesota passed the bill and President Bill Clinton later made the policy federal law.

Klobuchar was subsequently active in supporting Minnesota Democratic–Farmer–Labor (DFL) candidates, including Hennepin County Attorney Michael O. Freeman. She first sought public office in 1994, when Freeman ran for Minnesota governor, pledging to drop out of the nonpartisan Hennepin County Attorney race if Freeman chose instead to seek reelection to that position. When Freeman did not win the DFL endorsement for governor, Klobuchar stepped aside in June 1994 and supported Freeman for reelection.

== County Attorney of Hennepin County (1999–2007) ==
Klobuchar was elected Hennepin County attorney in 1998, running after Freeman declined to seek an additional term. In the nonpartisan election, she defeated Republican Sheryl Ramstad Hvass by a margin of less than 1%. Klobuchar was reelected unopposed in 2002.

In 2001, Minnesota Lawyer named her "Attorney of the Year". Klobuchar was president of the Minnesota County Attorneys Association from November 2002 to November 2003.

In 2002, Klobuchar spearheaded an effort that resulted in state laws being altered to allow felony charges to be brought against repeat drunk driving offenders. In 2003, Klobuchar dealt with one of her highest-profile cases when the Hennepin County Attorney's Office brought several charges against former professional baseball player Kirby Puckett related to an alleged sex crime. Puckett was acquitted by a jury of all charges brought against him.

Klobuchar took a "tough-on-crime" approach. At the time she took office, there was a crime wave in Minneapolis, with the city's murder rate much higher than the national rate. Klobuchar had won election on the slogan "More Trials, More Convictions". She pursued heavier sentencing and less favorable plea deals, and sought to bring more cases to trial. By the end of her first year, she had significantly increased the number of cases brought and convictions secured. Under Klobuchar, the Hennepin County Attorney's Office prosecuted people for possession of khat. At the time, it was rare in the United States for prosecutors to pursue prosecution on such charges. Klobuchar also brought felony charges against a number of men for failure to pay child support.

Klobuchar pursued tougher sentencing in hopes of deterring crime. For some smaller offenses, such as vandalism, she regularly sought sentences that exceeded the recommended duration. This was true for both adult and minor defendants. For property crime offenders who had five prior convictions, Klobuchar's office similarly pursued longer sentences than had been recommended. Klobuchar declared that she intended to scrutinize judges who were "letting offenders off the hook too easily". In 2000, a successful appeal by Klobuchar lengthened by two days a sentence that a judge gave an immigrant defendant, which placed the defendant at a greatly increased risk of deportation. The judge had originally imposed a sentence of 364 days. A sentence of 365 days or greater was likely to lead to the defendant's deportation, and the two days Klobuchar added placed the defendant over that threshold. An analysis by the Vera Institute of Justice found that during Klobuchar's tenure, there was a 20% increase in the number of prison inmates in Hennepin County, which the analysis attributed to the harsher sentences Klobuchar sought.

According to the Vera Institute of Justice, during Klobuchar's tenure there was a decrease in the disparity between the rates of African American and white rates of imprisonment, but the disparity remained pronounced at quadruple the national average.

Klobuchar successfully prosecuted teenage defendant Myon Burrell for the 2002 gunshot murder of 11-year-old Tyesha Edwards. Both Burrell and Edwards were African American. For much of her subsequent career, Klobuchar highlighted this case, framing it both as an example of her toughness on crime as well as an example of her fighting to provide justice for African-American communities affected by gun crime. Burrell remained steadfast in claiming that he was innocent. In late January 2020, during Klobuchar's presidential campaign, the Associated Press called attention to flaws in the case against Burrell, and quoted a co-defendant in the trial as having admitted that he, not Burrell, had actually fired the shot that killed Edwards. APM Reports also uncovered further consequential flaws with the case against Burrell. Due to these circumstances, his sentence was commuted by the Minnesota Board of Pardons in December 2020.

In 2004, Klobuchar supported the presidential campaign of U.S. senator John Kerry, traveling across Minnesota as a campaign surrogate.

Klobuchar did not prosecute any cases related to police brutality. During her tenure, Hennepin County saw 30 recorded police-involved deaths. Some of these deaths resulted in public controversy, but Klobuchar did not bring any charges. As was common practice at the time, especially in Minnesota, to determine whether to bring charges in such instances, Klobuchar relied on grand jury recommendations. Critics of her use of grand juries alleged that it lacked transparency and was perhaps a tactic for Klobuchar to distance herself from responsibility for the decisions made. After the 2020 murder of George Floyd in Minneapolis Police custody, renewed attention was brought to Klobuchar's tenure as Hennepin County Attorney. She was retrospectively criticized for not prosecuting police misconduct during her tenure. Attention was also brought to the fact that during Klobuchar's tenure an officer-involved killing had occurred that involved Officer Derek Chauvin, who later murdered Floyd. This killing did not result in prosecution. The killing occurred in October 2006, several months before Klobuchar left office, and a grand jury was empaneled by her successor (Freeman, who returned for a second stint as county attorney). The grand jury did not recommend any charges. This renewed scrutiny arose several months after Klobuchar concluded her presidential campaign, and while reporting had named her as a potential running mate of presumptive Democratic nominee Joe Biden.

== U.S. Senate (2007–present) ==
=== Elections ===
==== 2006 ====
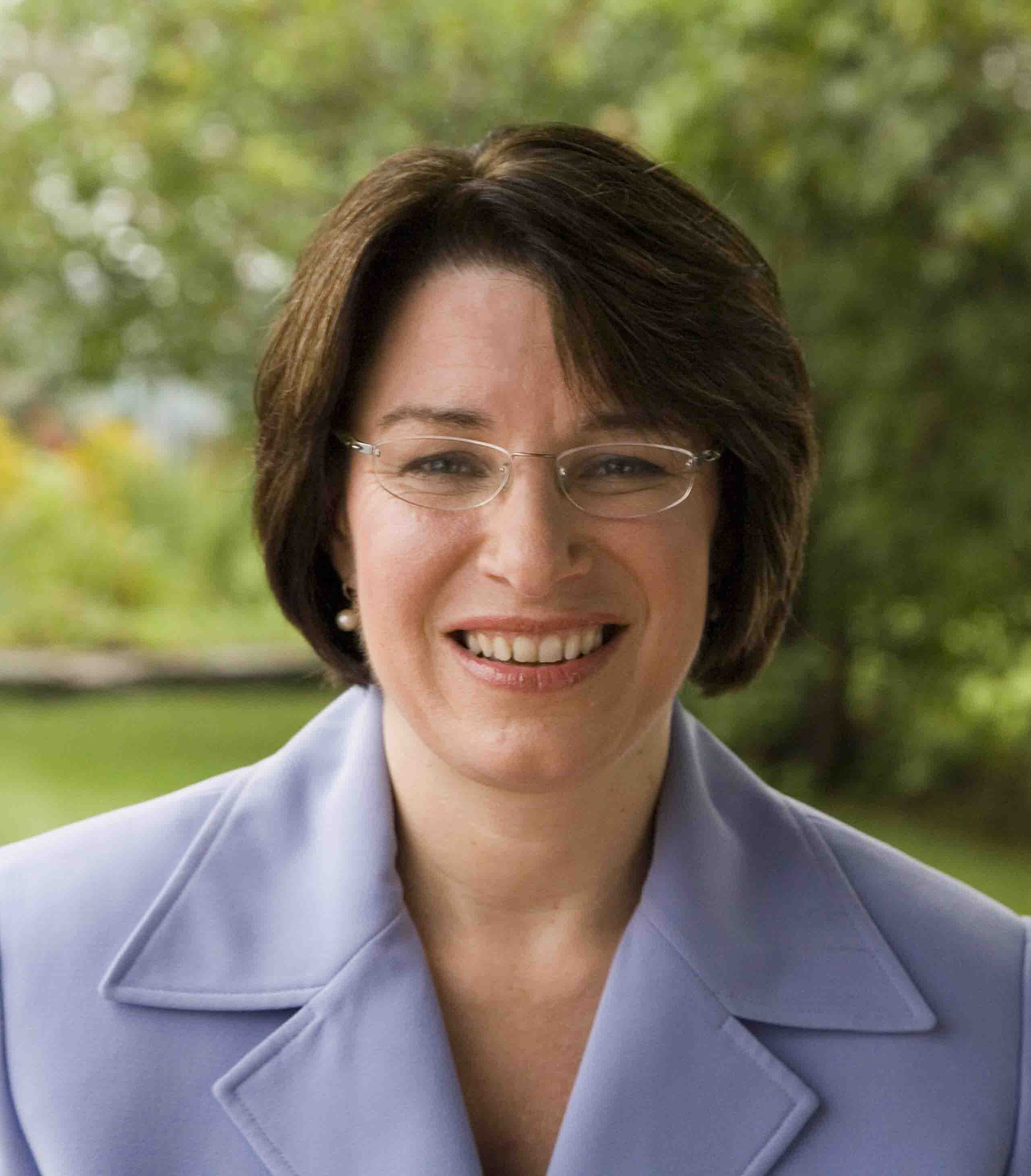
Official portrait, 2006.

In early 2005, after U.S. senator Mark Dayton announced that he would not seek reelection in 2006, Klobuchar became an early favorite for the DFL nomination. She had originally planned to run for attorney general of Minnesota, but was persuaded to run for Senate. Emily's List endorsed her on September 29, 2005, and Klobuchar won the DFL endorsement on June 9, 2006. She gained the support of the majority of DFL state legislators in Minnesota during the primaries. A poll of DFL state delegates showed Klobuchar beating her then closest opponent, Patty Wetterling, 66% to 15%. In January Wetterling dropped out of the race and endorsed Klobuchar. Former Senate candidate and prominent lawyer Mike Ciresi, who was widely seen as a serious potential DFL candidate, indicated in early February that he would not enter the race; that was viewed as an important boost for Klobuchar.

In the general election Klobuchar faced Republican candidate Mark Kennedy, Independence Party candidate Robert Fitzgerald, Constitution candidate Ben Powers, and Green Party candidate Michael Cavlan. Klobuchar led in the polls throughout the campaign, and won with 58% of the vote to Kennedy's 38% and Fitzgerald's 3%, carrying 79 of Minnesota's 87 counties. She is the first woman to be elected U.S. senator from Minnesota. (Muriel Humphrey, the state's first female senator and former second lady of the United States, was appointed to fill her husband's unexpired term and not elected.)

==== 2012 ====
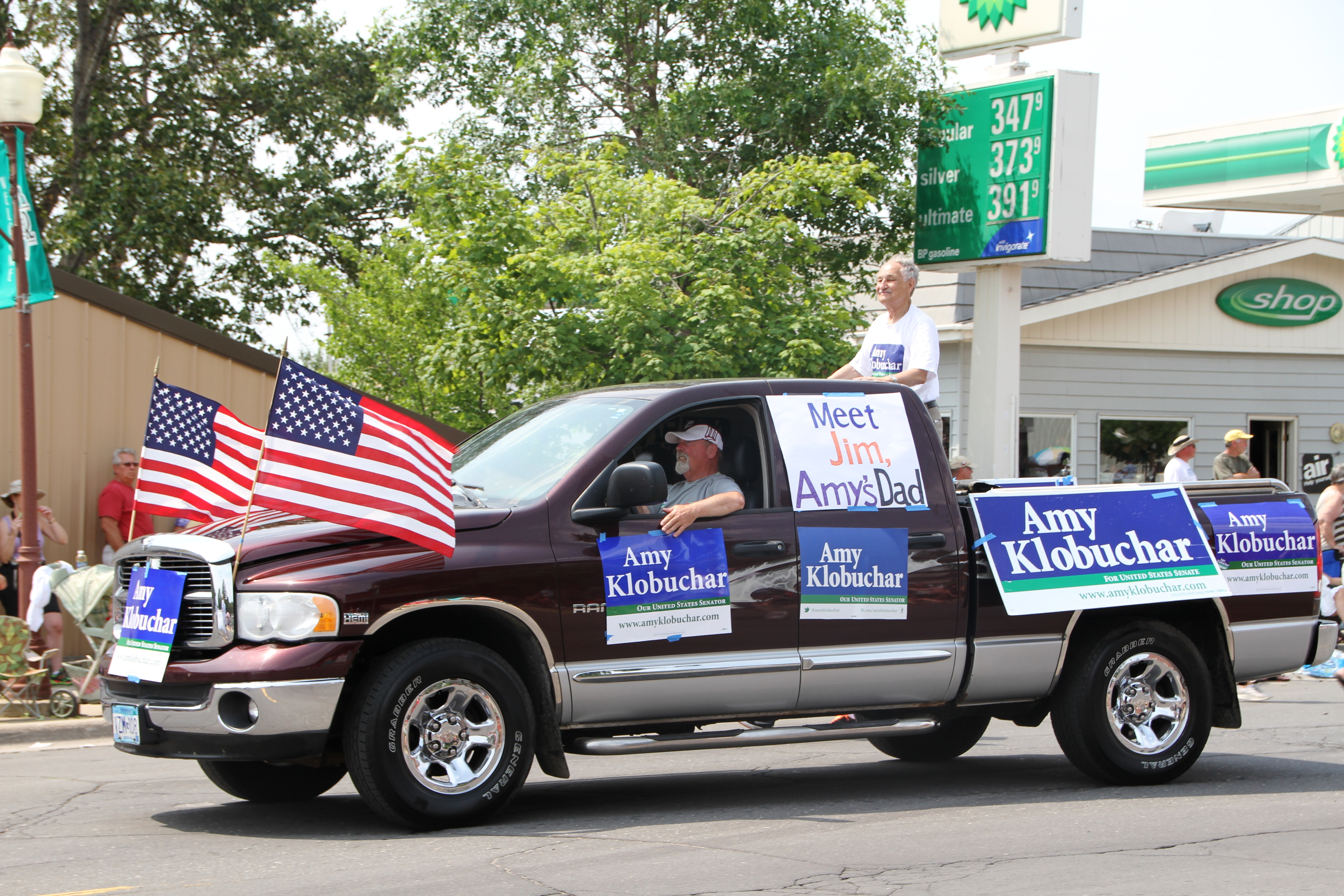
Klobuchar's father, Jim, and supporters campaigning for Klobuchar as U.S. senator, Tower, Minnesota, July 4, 2012

Klobuchar won a second term in the U.S. Senate, defeating Republican state representative Kurt Bills by a margin of 35 percentage points (65.23% to 30.53%), carrying all but two counties.

==== 2018 ====
Klobuchar ran for a third term and was reelected by a 24-point margin. The Republican nominee was state representative Jim Newberger. The race was not seen as close, with Klobuchar outraising Newberger $9.9 million to $210,066 as of October 17. Klobuchar maintained a double-digit lead in the polls all autumn.

==== 2024 ====
In 2024, Klobuchar won a fourth term. In May, she won the DFL endorsement to be the Democratic nominee for the race. She won the primary election on August 13, and defeated Republican nominee Royce White in the general election.

=== Tenure ===
A September 2009 poll found 58% of Minnesotans approved of the job Klobuchar was doing and 36% disapproved. On March 12, 2010, Rasmussen Reports indicated 67% of Minnesotans approved of the job she was doing. The Winona Daily News described her as a "rare politician who works across the aisle". Walter Mondale said, "She has done better in that miserable Senate than most people there."

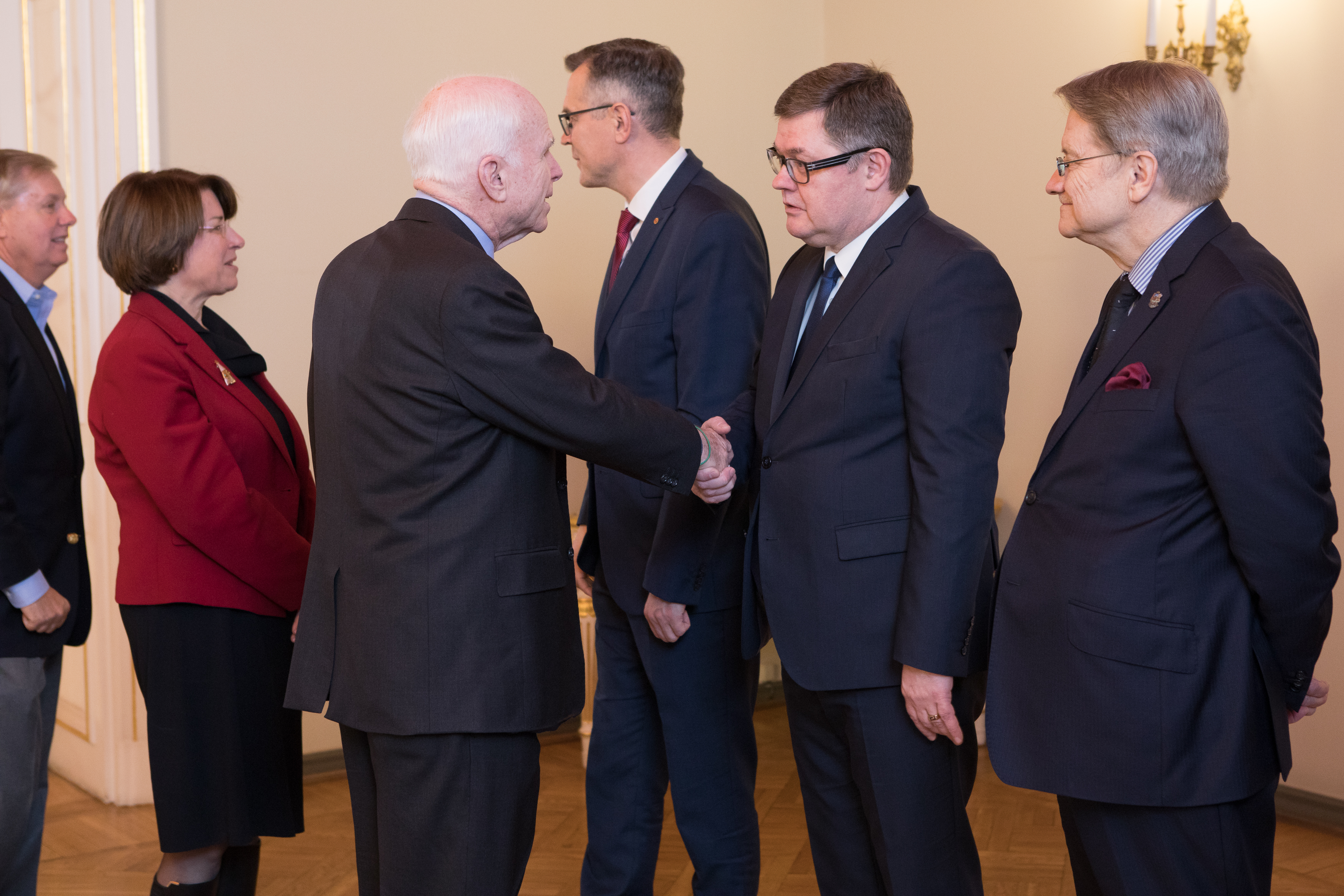
Klobuchar with Lindsey Graham and John McCain in Latvia in 2016

At the end of the 114th Congress in late 2016, Klobuchar had passed more legislation than any other senator. In February 2017 she called for an independent, bipartisan commission to investigate ties between Russia and President Donald Trump and his administration. Concern about Trump's ties to Russia increased after reports that his campaign officials had repeated contact with senior Russian intelligence officials before the 2016 United States elections. Klobuchar had already signaled her interest in U.S.–Russia relations in December 2016 when she joined Republican senators John McCain and Lindsey Graham on a trip to the Baltic states and Ukraine. She maintained high approval ratings throughout 2017, with an April 2017 Star Tribune poll placing her approval rating at 72%. In October 2017 Morning Consult listed Klobuchar among the 10 senators with the highest approval ratings, and a November 2017 KSTP-TV poll put her approval rating at 56%. An April 2019 Morning Consult poll found Klobuchar to be the third-most popular sitting senator, with a 58% approval rating and 26% disapproval rating, behind only Vermont senators Bernie Sanders and Patrick Leahy.

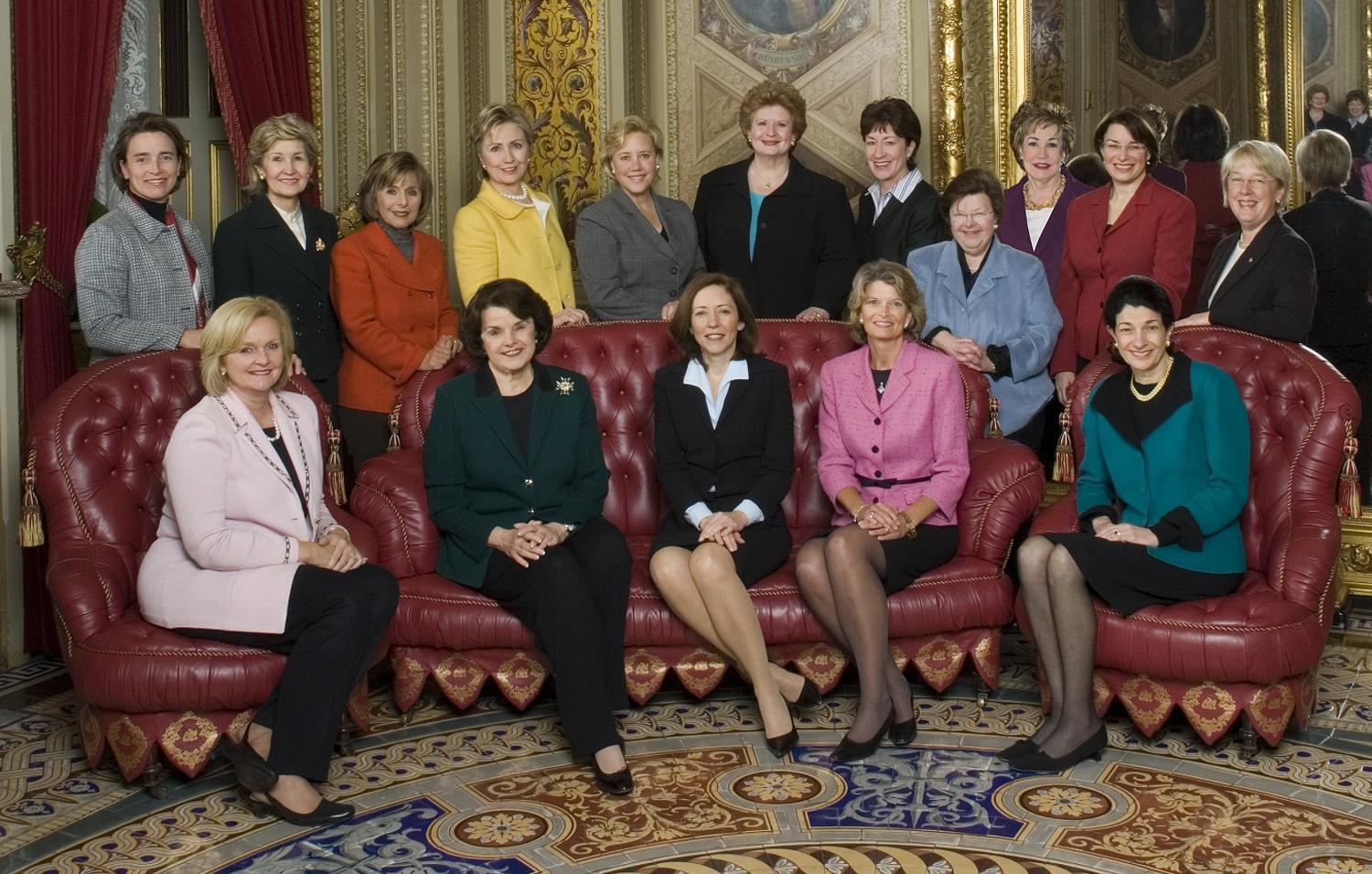
Female senators of the 110th Congress, Klobuchar standing, second from the right, January 2007

According to the Center for Effective Lawmaking, Klobuchar scored "above expectations" with respect to how successful she was at moving significant legislation in the 115th Congress (2017–18).

During the Brett Kavanaugh Supreme Court nomination hearings in 2018, Kavanaugh gave heated responses to Klobuchar's questions about whether he had ever experienced memory loss after consuming alcohol, for which he later apologized.

There has been negative publicity about Klobuchar's treatment of her staff throughout her tenure in office. In February 2019, BuzzFeed News reported that interviews with former staffers and reviews of emails indicated that Klobuchar frequently abused and humiliated her employees, requiring significant staff time to manage her ire. The article reported that other employees found her to be "fair and effective" and a good boss. Politico reported that Klobuchar had the highest annual staff turnover rate of any senator—36%—between 2011 and 2016. A Huffington Post article alleged she had a reputation for mistreating her staff, with some staff alleging she was prone to bursts of cruelty. In response to the negative reports, 61 former staffers wrote an open letter praising Klobuchar, stating that she was a caring "mentor and friend" to them.

In the 115th Congress, she was absent for 0.5% of votes, with two-thirds of the senators missing more votes. In the 116th Congress (2019–2021), during her presidential campaign, she had missed 39.1% of votes as of January 2020, making her the 5th-most absent senator.

Klobuchar was at the U.S. Capitol when Trump supporters stormed it on January 6, 2021. As ranking Democrat on the Senate Rules Committee, she and Senator Roy Blunt co-led Senate deliberations during the 2021 United States Electoral College vote count. She also served as a teller, along with Blunt, Representative Rodney Davis, and Representative Zoe Lofgren. After Senate Republicans, led by Senator Ted Cruz, objected to certifying Arizona's electoral votes, Klobuchar participated in the debate on the Senate floor. Shortly after she gave her remarks, the Capitol was breached. As the Senate adjourned, Klobuchar was alerted on her phone that shots were fired inside the Capitol, which she announced to those present. Immediately, Klobuchar, fellow senators, staff and journalists were evacuated from the chambers to a secure location. When the Capitol was secure, Congress reconvened and the election count was certified in the early morning of January 7. Klobuchar supported the certification. Later that day, Klobuchar said she supported the invocation of the Twenty-fifth Amendment to the United States Constitution to remove Trump from office "because you cannot have a president basically leading an insurrection against our own country's government." She also called for investigations into the breach.

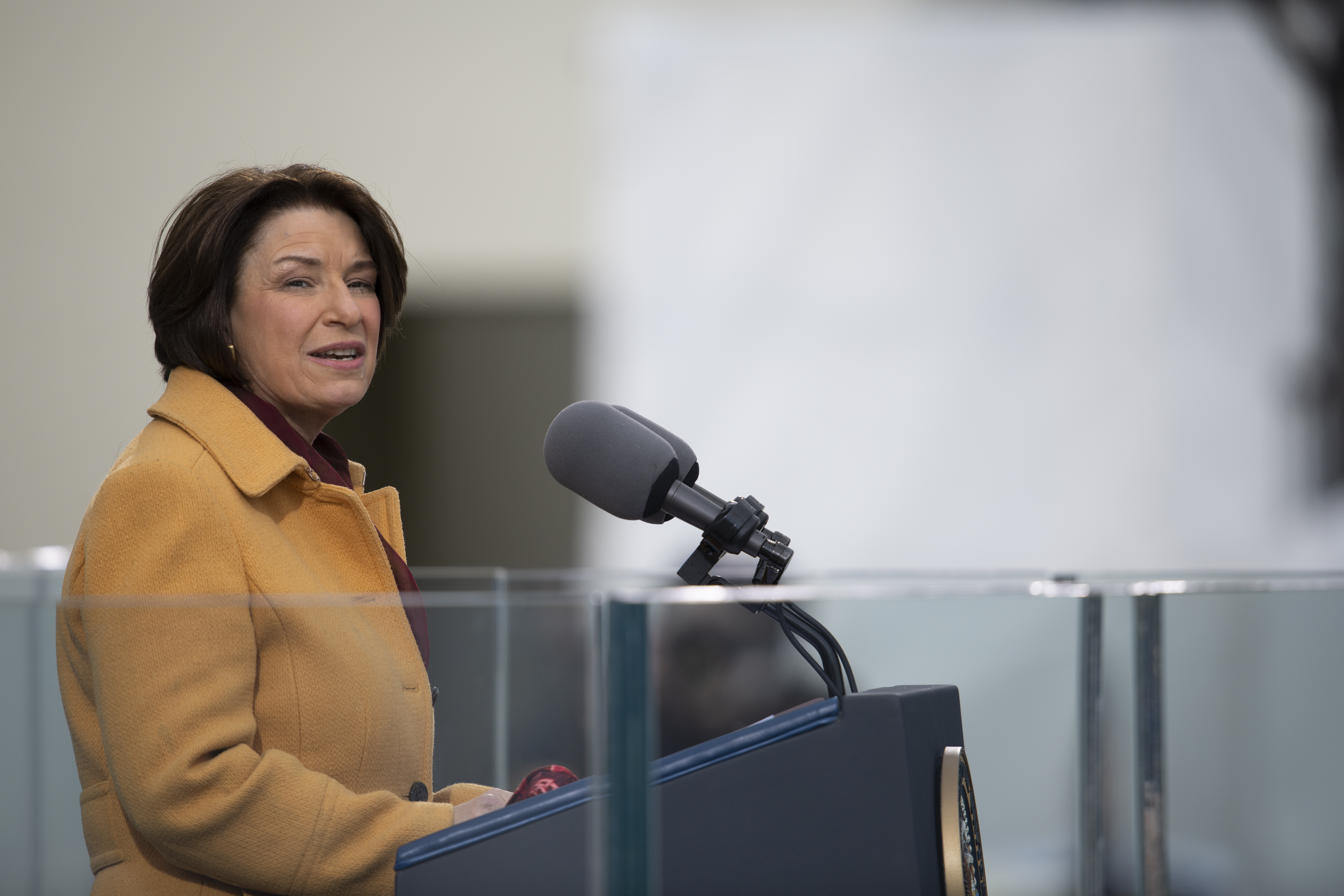
Klobuchar speaking at the inauguration of Joe Biden

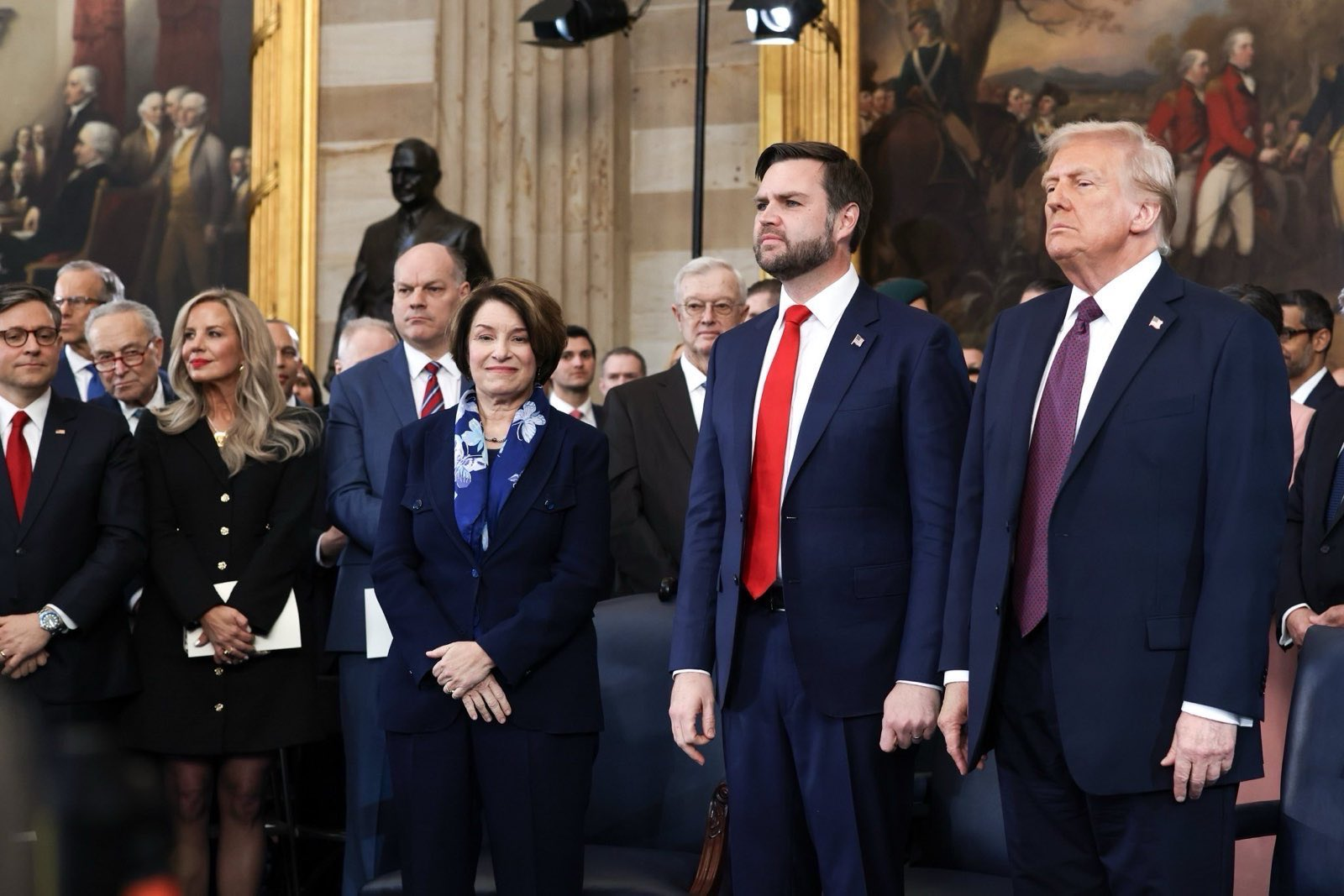
Klobuchar standing with Donald Trump and JD Vance during the second inauguration of Donald Trump

Klobuchar was the first speaker at Joe Biden's inauguration on January 20, 2021.

==== Role in the Democratic Party ====
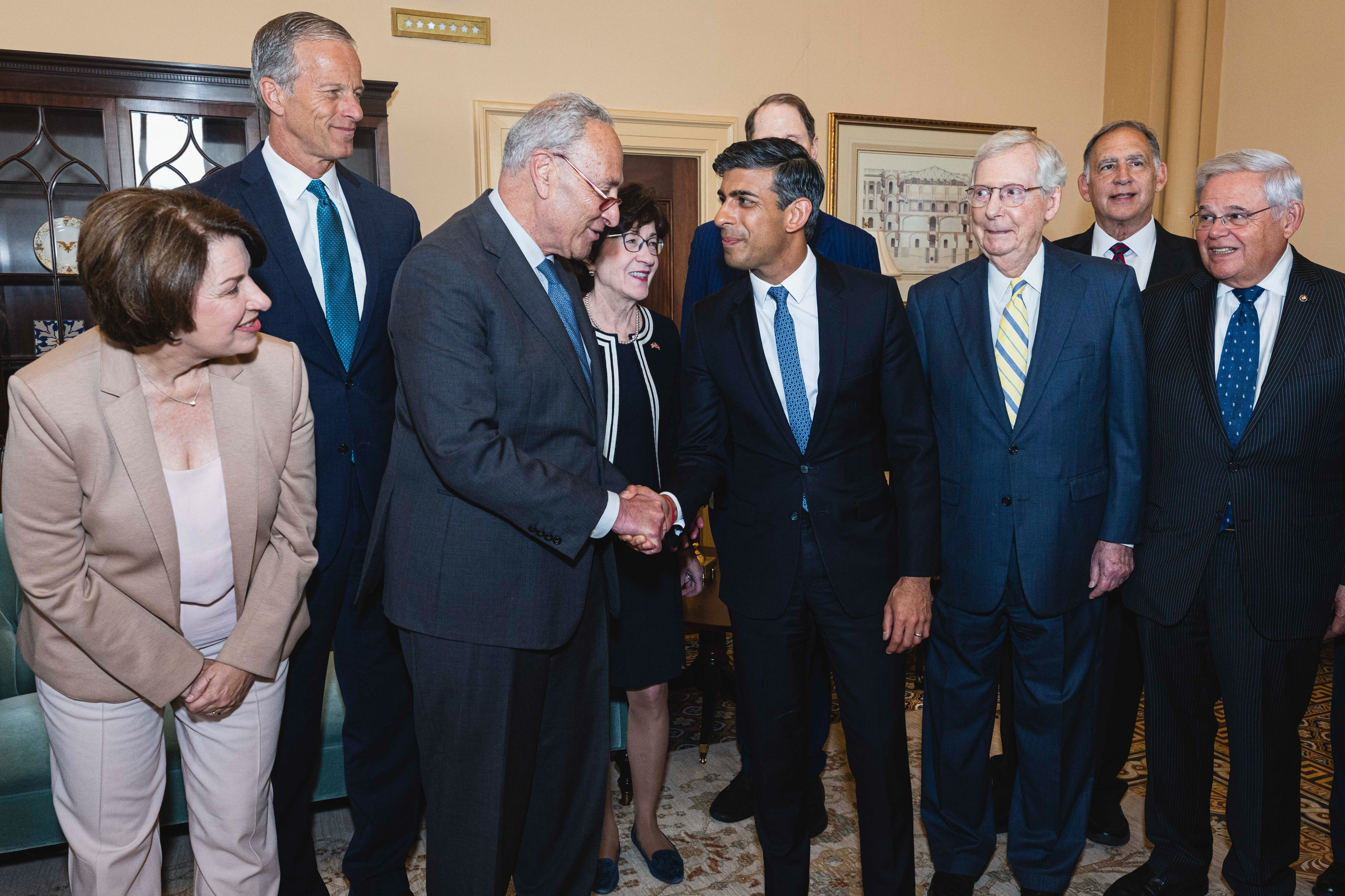
Klobuchar with Chuck Schumer and British Prime Minister Rishi Sunak at the US Capitol, June 7, 2023

On March 30, 2008, Klobuchar announced her endorsement of Senator Barack Obama in the Democratic presidential primary, promising her superdelegate vote to him. She cited his performance in the Minnesota caucuses, where he won with 66% of the popular vote, as well as her own "independent judgment". In 2016 she was an early supporter of Hillary Clinton's second campaign for the Democratic presidential nomination.

Klobuchar has served as the chair of the U.S. Senate Democratic Steering and Outreach Committee since 2015. She became the steering chair of the committee in 2017, with Bernie Sanders as the outreach chair. Both represented the Democratic Party in a 2017 televised debate on healthcare policy and the possible repeal of the Affordable Care Act on CNN.

In 2020, Klobuchar was speculated to be a possible candidate for secretary of agriculture or United States attorney general in the Biden administration.

==== Deepfake video ====
On July 31, 2025, a deepfake video of Klobuchar was published on Twitter and went viral. The video used footage of a July 30 Senate hearing and purported to show her speaking vulgarly in response to American Eagle's July 2025 ad campaign involving Sydney Sweeney. In a New York Times op-ed on the subject published on August 20, Klobuchar wrote that Twitter "refused to take it down or label it" as AI-generated, instead recommending that she try to have a Community Note added to the tweet. She implored Congress to pass legislation regulating deepfakes and other AI-generated content.

=== Committee assignments ===
119th Congress (Current)

- Committee on Agriculture, Nutrition, and Forestry (Ranking Member)
- Committee on Commerce, Science, and Transportation
- Committee on Rules and Administration
- Committee on the Judiciary
- Joint Committee on Printing (Vice Chairman)
- Joint Committee on the Library (Chairman)
- Joint Congressional Committee on Inaugural Ceremonies – 2024 (Chairman)
- Joint Economic Committee

==== 118th Congress ====
In the 118th Congress, Klobuchar served on the following standing committees:

- Committee on Agriculture, Nutrition, and Forestry
  - Subcommittee on Conservation, Climate, Forestry, and Natural Resources
  - Subcommittee on Food and Nutrition, Specialty Crops, Organics, and Research
  - Subcommittee on Rural Development and Energy
- Committee on Commerce, Science, and Transportation
  - Subcommittee on Communications, Media, and Broadband
  - Subcommittee on Consumer Protection, Product Safety, and Data Security
  - Subcommittee on Surface Transportation, Maritime, Freight, and Ports
  - Subcommittee on Tourism, Trade, and Export Promotion
- Committee on the Judiciary
  - Subcommittee on Competition Policy, Antitrust, and Consumer Rights (chair)
  - Subcommittee on Criminal Justice and Counterterrorism
  - Subcommittee on Immigration, Citizenship, and Border Safety
  - Subcommittee on Privacy, Technology, and the Law
- Committee on Rules and Administration (chair)
- Joint Committee on the Library (ex officio)
- Joint Committee on Printing (ex officio)
- Joint Economic Committee

==== 117th Congress ====
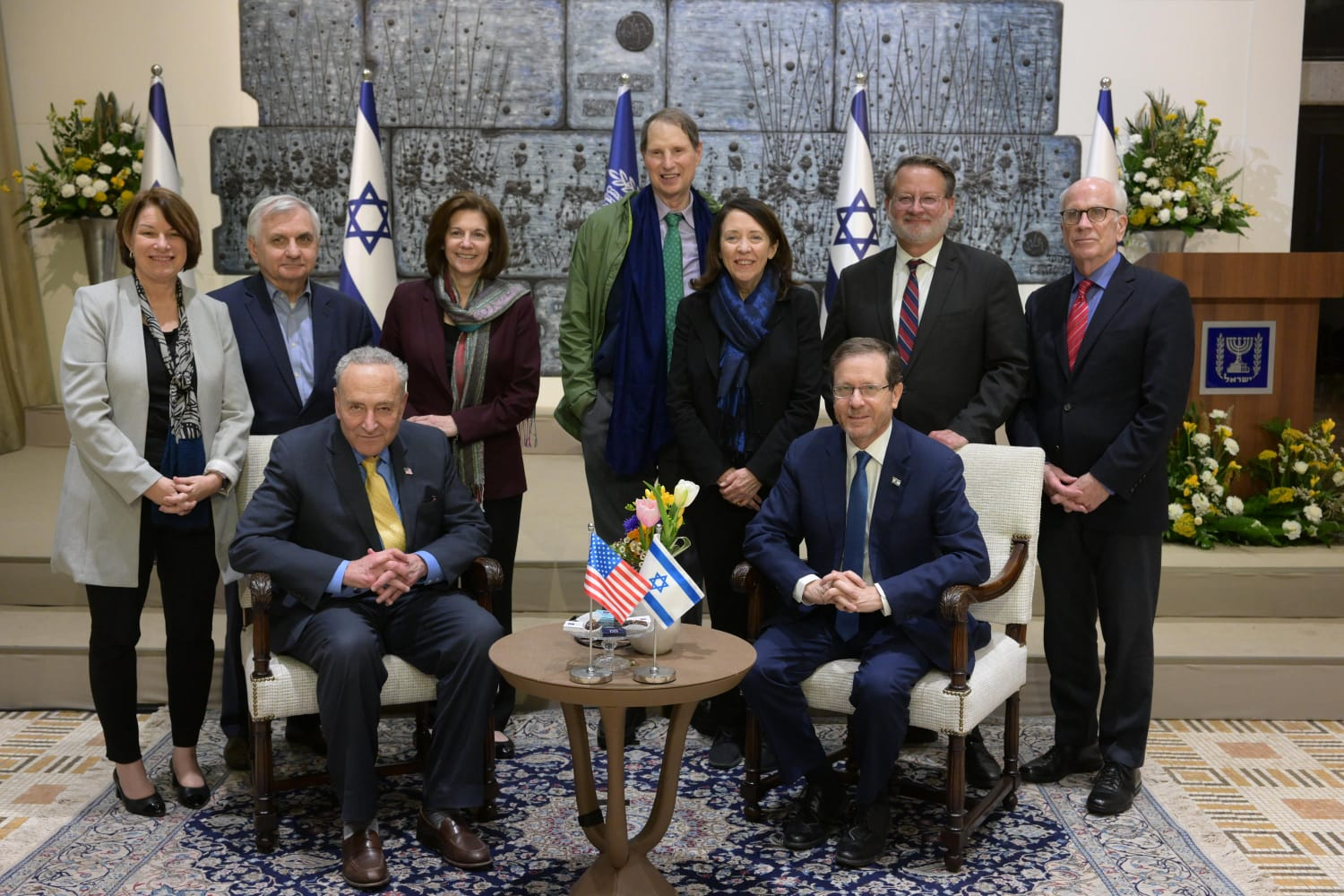
Klobuchar with Israeli President Isaac Herzog during a visit by a delegation of Democratic U.S. senators to Israel, February 2023

In the 117th Congress, Klobuchar served on the following standing committees:

- Committee on Agriculture, Nutrition, and Forestry
  - Subcommittee on Conservation, Climate, Forestry, and Natural Resources
  - Subcommittee on Food and Nutrition, Specialty Crops, Organics, and Research
  - Subcommittee on Rural Development and Energy
- Committee on Commerce, Science, and Transportation
  - Subcommittee on Communications, Media, and Broadband
  - Subcommittee on Consumer Protection, Product Safety, and Data Security
  - Subcommittee on Surface Transportation, Maritime, Freight, and Ports
  - Subcommittee on Tourism, Trade, and Export Promotion
- Committee on the Judiciary
  - Subcommittee on Competition Policy, Antitrust, and Consumer Rights (chair)
  - Subcommittee on Criminal Justice and Counterterrorism
  - Subcommittee on Immigration, Citizenship, and Border Safety
  - Subcommittee on Privacy, Technology, and the Law
- Committee on Rules and Administration (chair)
- Joint Committee on the Library (ex officio)
- Joint Committee on Printing (ex officio)
- Joint Economic Committee

==== 116th Congress ====
In the 116th Congress, Klobuchar served on the following standing committees:

- Committee on Agriculture, Nutrition and Forestry
  - Subcommittee on Conservation, Forestry and Natural Resources
  - Subcommittee on Livestock, Marketing and Agriculture Security
  - Subcommittee on Rural Development and Energy
- Committee on Commerce, Science and Transportation
  - Subcommittee on Communications, Technology, Innovation, and the Internet
  - Subcommittee on Manufacturing, Trade, and Consumer Protection
  - Subcommittee on Transportation and Safety
  - Subcommittee on Security
- Committee on the Judiciary
  - Subcommittee on Antitrust, Competition Policy and Consumer Rights (ranking member)
  - Subcommittee on Crime and Terrorism
  - Subcommittee on Border Security and Immigration
  - Subcommittee on Oversight, Agency Action, Federal Rights, and Federal Courts
- Committee on Rules and Administration (ranking member)
- Joint Committee on the Library (ex officio)
- Joint Committee on Printing (ex officio)
- Joint Economic Committee

==== Other Congresses ====
In her first Congress, the 110th Congress, Klobuchar was assigned to the following committees:

- Committee on Agriculture, Nutrition and Forestry
- Committee on Commerce, Science and Transportation
- Committee on Environment and Public Works
- Joint Economic Committee

=== Caucus memberships ===
- Congressional NextGen 9-1-1 Caucus
- Congressional Coalition on Adoption (co-chair)
- Rare Disease Caucus (co-chair)

== 2020 presidential campaign ==
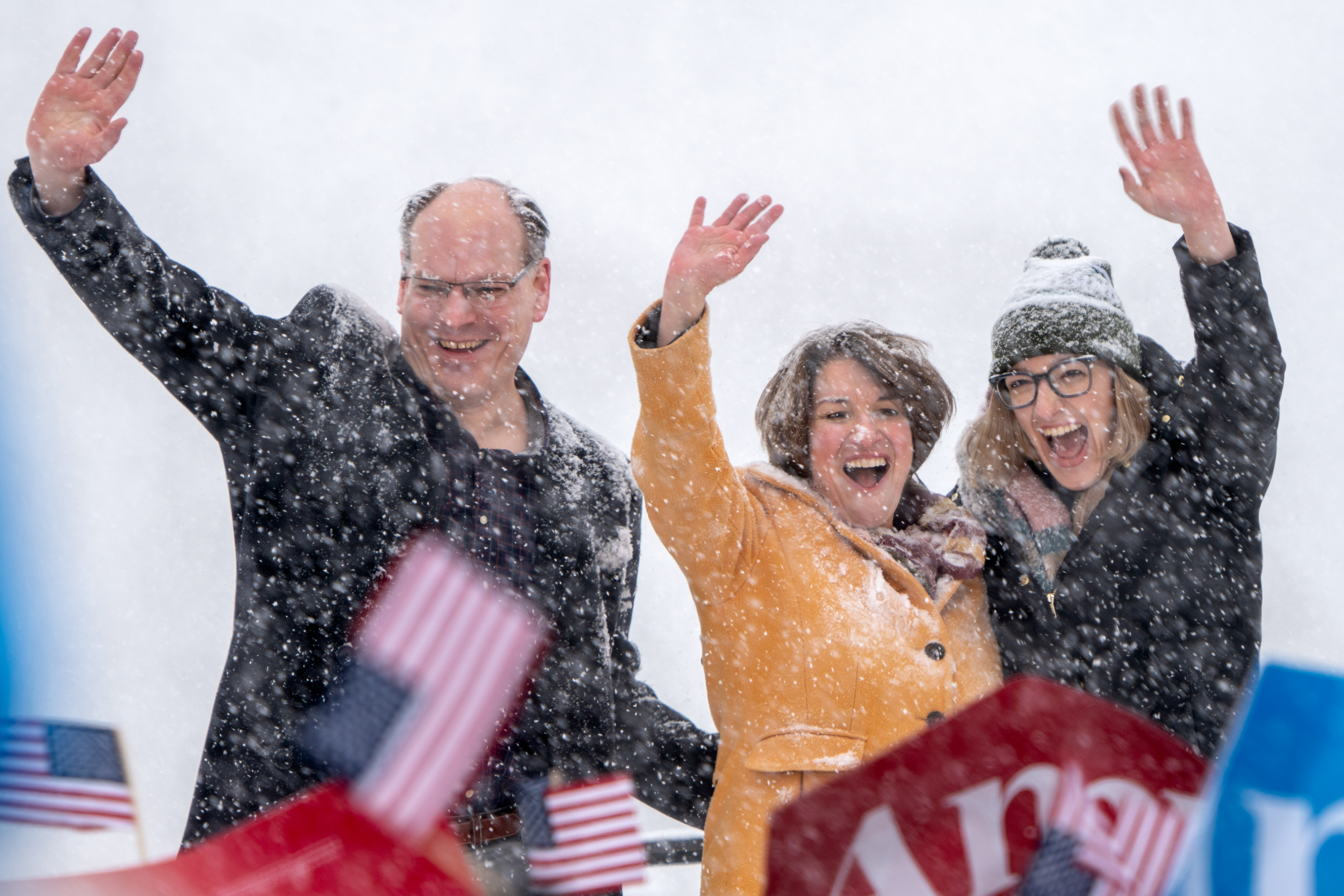
Klobuchar (center) with her husband and daughter at her campaign announcement

Klobuchar campaign logo

The New York Times and The New Yorker named Klobuchar as one of the women most likely to become the first female president of the United States, and MSNBC and The New Yorker named her as a possible nominee to the U.S. Supreme Court.

On February 10, 2019, Klobuchar announced her candidacy in the 2020 Democratic Party presidential primaries. She has said that she uses humor as one way to distinguish herself among the many other Democratic candidates in the 2020 campaign.

On January 19, 2020, The New York Times editorial board endorsed Klobuchar and Elizabeth Warren for president.

On March 2, 2020, the day before Super Tuesday, Klobuchar suspended her campaign and endorsed Joe Biden.

On May 21, 2020, it was reported that Biden asked several women, including Klobuchar, to undergo formal vetting for consideration as his vice-presidential running mate. On June 18, Klobuchar withdrew herself from consideration, saying that Biden should choose a woman of color.

== 2026 gubernatorial campaign ==
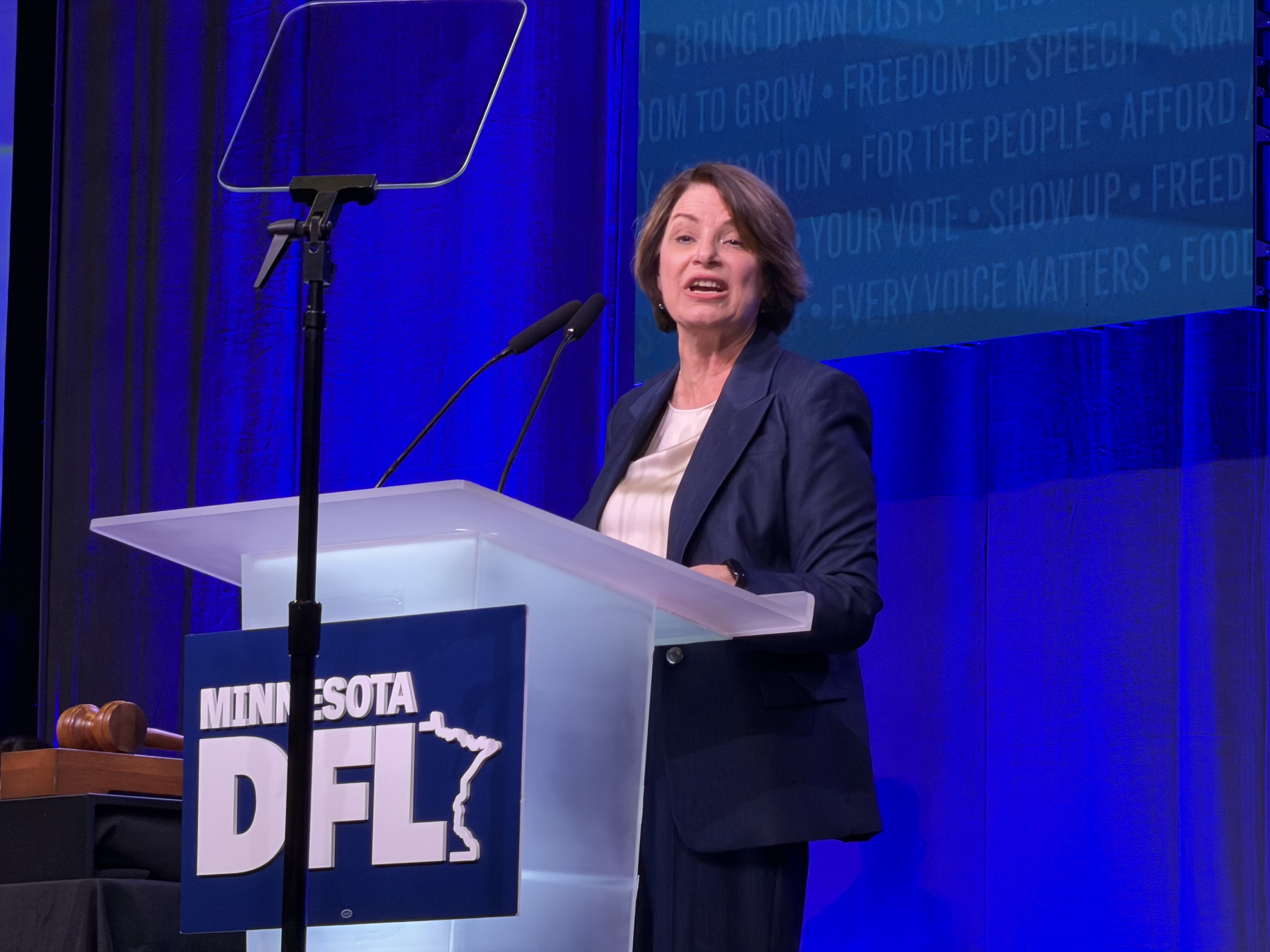
Klobuchar speaks at 2026 DFL Convention

On January 22, 2026, Klobuchar filed to run for governor of Minnesota after incumbent Tim Walz withdrew from the race. On January 29, she officially confirmed her candidacy. On May 29, she announced former Fergus Falls mayor Ben Schierer as her running mate. On August 11, she became the first woman to win the DFL nomination for governor. She won the Democratic primary with 89.7% of the vote and defeated Republican nominee Lisa Demuth in the general election, becoming the first woman elected governor of Minnesota.

== Political positions ==
Klobuchar's political positions have generally been in line with modern American liberalism. She is pro-choice on abortion, supports LGBT rights and the Affordable Care Act, and was critical of the Iraq War. During the 115th Congress, she voted in line with President Donald Trump's position on legislation 31.1 percent of the time.

According to GovTrack, Klobuchar passed more legislation than any other senator by the end of the 114th Congress in late 2016. According to Congress.gov, as of December 16, 2018, she had sponsored or co-sponsored 111 pieces of legislation that became law.

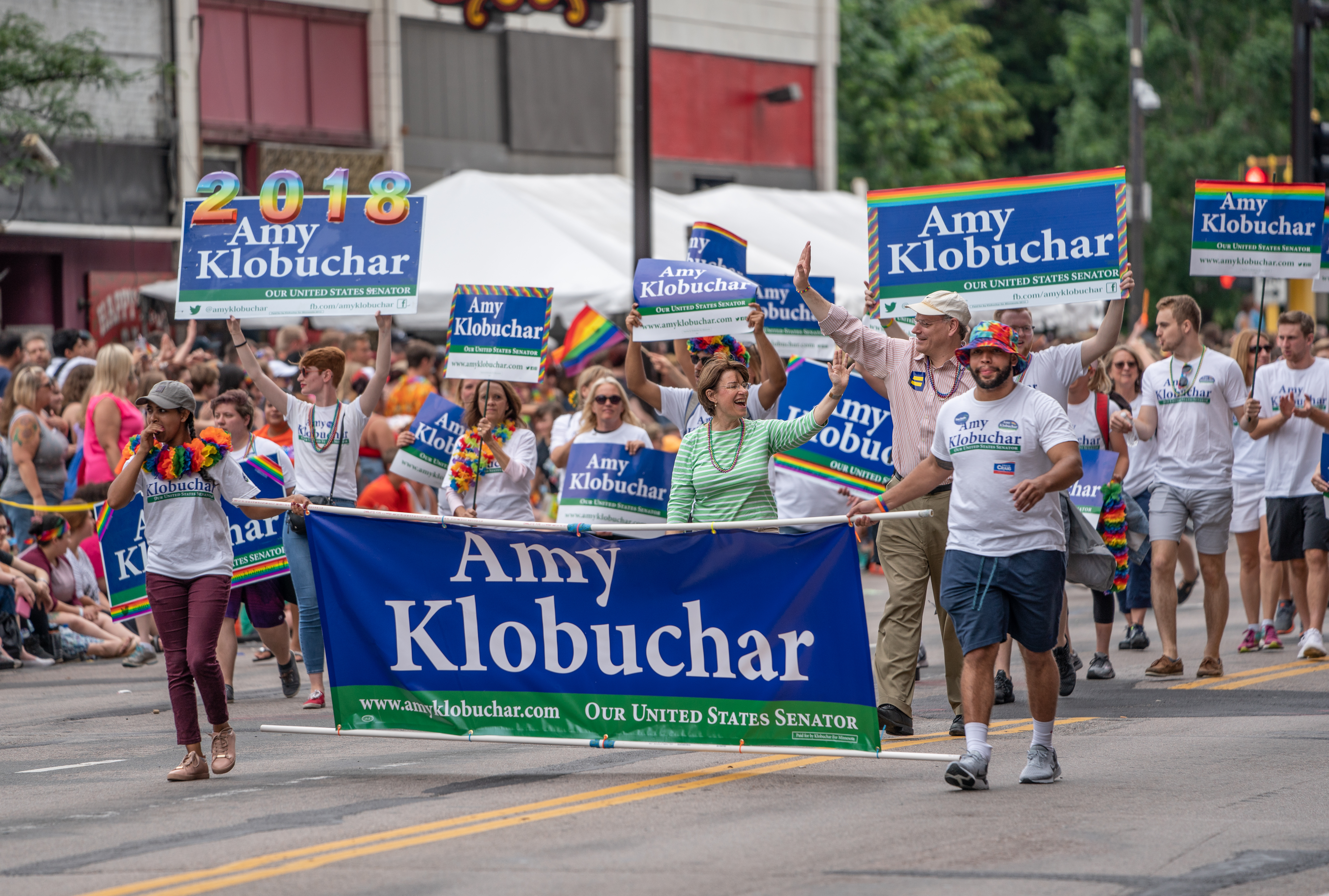
Klobuchar at Twin Cities Pride Parade in 2018

In 2023, the Lugar Center ranked Klobuchar in the top fifth of senators for bipartisanship.

== Personal life and family ==
In 1993, Klobuchar married John Bessler, a private practice attorney and a professor at the University of Baltimore School of Law. They have a daughter who graduated from Yale University and worked as a legislative director for New York councilman Keith Powers.

Klobuchar is a member of the United Church of Christ and is a cousin of musician Zola Jesus.

In September 2021, Klobuchar revealed that she had been diagnosed with Stage 1A breast cancer in February 2021, that she had undergone a successful lumpectomy, and that in May she had completed a course of radiation treatment. In August, her doctors determined that the treatments had all been successful and she was cancer-free. In July 2024, Klobuchar announced that she was still cancer-free after undergoing minor surgery and brief radiation treatment.

Klobuchar's grandparents were immigrants from Slovenia's White Carniola region. Her paternal grandfather was a miner on Minnesota's Iron Range. Her maternal grandparents emigrated from Switzerland to the United States.

== Awards and honors ==
Klobuchar has received a number of awards during her career. Minnesota Lawyer named her "Attorney of the Year" in 2001 and Mothers Against Drunk Driving gave her a leadership award for advocating for successful passage of Minnesota's first felony DWI law. Working Mother named her a 2008 "Best in Congress" for her efforts on behalf of working families, and The American Prospect named her a "woman to watch".

In 2012, Klobuchar received the Sheldon Coleman Great Outdoors Award at a special Great Outdoors Week celebration presented by the American Recreation Coalition. She was one of the recipients of the Agricultural Retailers Association's 2012 Legislator of the Year Award, alongside Republican representative John Mica. In 2013, Klobuchar received an award for her leadership in the fight to prevent sexual assault in the military at a national summit hosted by the Service Women's Action Network (SWAN). Also, in 2013, she received a Friend of CACFP award for her leadership in passing the Healthy Hunger Free Kids act and her efforts to set new nutrition standards for all meals served in the CACFP by the National Child and Adult Care Food Program (CACFP) Sponsors Association. Klobuchar and Senator Al Franken received the 2014 Friends of Farm Bureau Award from the Minnesota branch of the American Farm Bureau Federation.

Klobuchar received the American Bar Association's Congressional Justice Award in 2015 for her efforts to protect vulnerable populations from violence, exploitation, and assault and to eliminate discrimination in the workplace. Also in 2015 the National Consumers League honored Klobuchar with the Trumpeter Award for her work "on regulation to strengthen consumer product safety legislation, on ensuring a fair and competitive marketplace, and increasing accessibility to communications, specifically in the wireless space". In 2016, she received the Goodwill Policymaker Award from Goodwill Industries for her commitment to the nonprofit sector and leading the Nonprofit Energy Efficiency Act. In 2017, she received the Arabella Babb Mansfield Award from the National Association of Women Lawyers and was chosen as the Mary Louise Smith Chair in Women and Politics for the Carrie Chapman Catt Center at Iowa State University. In 2021, Klobuchar received the Award for Distinguished Public Service from the Association of American Publishers. During an official visit to Ukraine in August 2022, she was awarded the Ukrainian Order of Merit, First Class from President Zelenskyy. In 2024, she received the Distinguished Public Service Award from The American Legion.

== Publications ==
=== Books ===
External videos
- After Words interview with Amy Klobuchar on The Senator Next Door, September 12, 2015, C-SPAN

Klobuchar has written four books. In 1986, she published Uncovering the Dome, a case study of the 10-year political struggle to build the Hubert H. Humphrey Metrodome. In 2015, she published an autobiography, The Senator Next Door: A Memoir from the Heartland. In 2021, Antitrust: Taking on Monopoly Power from the Gilded Age to the Digital Age was published, a sprawling, 624-page historical overview of antitrust law in the United States, up to the current regulatory issues facing Big Tech, the American public, and the world. In 2023, she published The Joy of Politics.

=== Articles ===
- "I Learned 2 Things From My First Job With Walter Mondale", The New York Times, April 20, 2021

== See also ==
- Barack Obama Supreme Court candidates
- List of County Attorneys of Hennepin County
- List of female governors in the United States
- List of female United States presidential and vice presidential candidates
- Women in the United States Senate

== Notes ==
Party political offices
| Preceded by Mark Dayton | Democratic nominee for U.S. Senator from Minnesota (Class 1); 2006, 2012, 2018, 2024 | Most recent |
| Preceded by Mark Begich | Chair of the Senate Democratic Steering and Outreach Committee; 2015–2017 | Succeeded by Herself as Chair of the Senate Democratic Steering Committee |
| Preceded by Mark Begich | Chair of the Senate Democratic Steering and Outreach Committee; 2015–2017 | Succeeded by Bernie Sanders as Chair of the Senate Democratic Outreach Committee |
| Preceded by Herself as Chair of the Senate Democratic Steering and Outreach Committee | Chair of the Senate Democratic Steering Committee; 2017–2025 | Succeeded by Herself as Chair of the Senate Democratic Steering and Policy Committee |
| Preceded by Herself as Chair of the Senate Democratic Steering Committee | Chair of the Senate Democratic Steering and Policy Committee; 2025–present | Incumbent |
| Preceded by Debbie Stabenow as Chair of the Senate Democratic Policy and Communications Committee | Chair of the Senate Democratic Steering and Policy Committee; 2025–present | Incumbent |
| Preceded by Tim Walz | Democratic nominee for Governor of Minnesota; 2026 | Most recent |
U.S. Senate
| Preceded by Mark Dayton | U.S. Senator (Class 1) from Minnesota; 2007–present Served alongside: Norm Coleman, Al Franken, Tina Smith | Incumbent |
| Preceded by Chuck Schumer | Ranking Member of the Senate Rules Committee; 2017–2021 | Succeeded by Roy Blunt |
| Preceded by Roy Blunt | Chair of the Senate Rules Committee; 2021–2025 | Succeeded by Mitch McConnell |
| Preceded by Zoe Lofgren | Chair of the Joint Printing Committee; 2021–2023 | Succeeded by Bryan Steil |
| Preceded by Zoe Lofgren | Chair of the Joint Library Committee; 2023–2025 | Succeeded by Bryan Steil |
| Preceded by Roy Blunt | Chair of the Joint Inaugural Ceremonies Committee; 2024–2025 | Vacant |
| Preceded by John Boozman | Ranking Member of the Senate Agriculture Committee; 2025–present | Incumbent |
Political offices
| Preceded by Tim Walz | Governor of Minnesota; Taking office 2027 | Elect |
U.S. order of precedence (ceremonial)
| Preceded by Bernie Sanders | Order of precedence of the United States as United States Senator | Succeeded by Roger Wicker |
| Preceded by Bernie Sanders | United States senators by seniority 15th | Succeeded by Sheldon Whitehouse |
