= 107th United States Congress =

2001–2003 U.S. legislative term

←	106th	108th	→
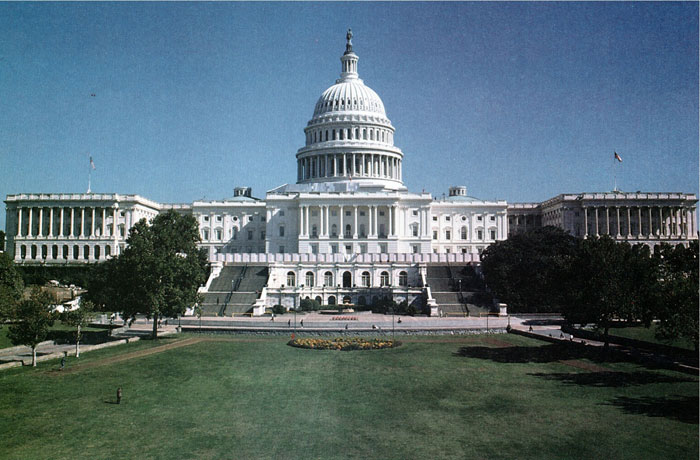
- United States Capitol (2002)

Overview
- Legislative body: United States Congress
- Jurisdiction: United States
- Term: January 3, 2001 – January 3, 2003

Senate
- Members: 100
- President: Al Gore (D) (Note: U.S. Vice President Al Gore's term as President of the Senate ended at noon on January 20, 2001, when Dick Cheney's term began.) (until January 20, 2001); Dick Cheney (R) (from January 20, 2001)
- President pro tempore: Robert Byrd (D) (Note: When the Congress began, the Senate was divided 50–50. Because the Vice President's tie-breaking vote would change control from Democrats to Republicans on January 20, the Senate elected Byrd to serve until noon and Thurmond to serve from noon on January 20. Control changed again from June 6, 2001, when Jim Jeffords left the Republican Party and Byrd was once again elected President pro tempore.) (until January 20, 2001); Strom Thurmond (R) (Jan 20, 2001 – Jun 6, 2001); Robert Byrd (D) (from June 6, 2001)
- Party control: Democratic (with tie-breaking VP) (until January 20, 2001); Republican (with tie-breaking VP) (Jan 20, 2001 – Jun 6, 2001); Democratic (through caucus) (from June 6, 2001)

House of Representatives
- Members: 435 representatives 5 non-voting delegates
- Speaker: Dennis Hastert (R)
- Party control: Republican

Sessions
- 1st: January 3, 2001 – December 20, 2001
- 2nd: January 23, 2002 – November 22, 2002

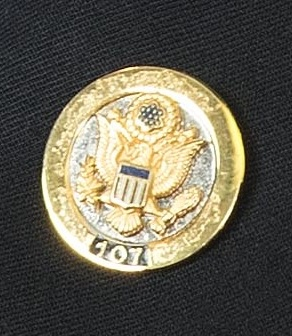
107th Congress House member pin

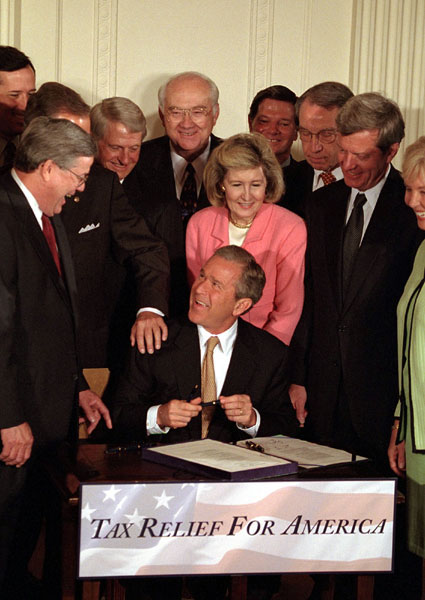
President George W. Bush signing the Economic Growth and Tax Relief Reconciliation Act of 2001 in the White House East Room on June 7, 2001

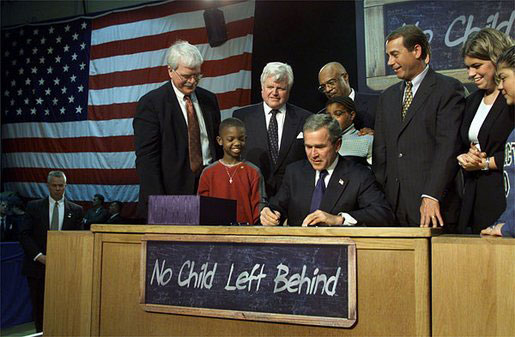
President George W. Bush signing the No Child Left Behind Act.

President George W. Bush signs the No Child Left Behind Act into law

President George W. Bush in October 2001, elucidating on the government's rationale behind the USA PATRIOT Act before signing into law.

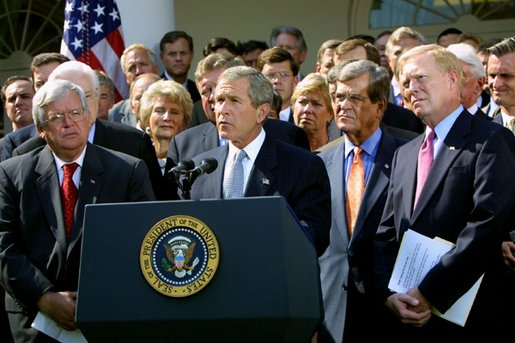
President George W. Bush, surrounded by leaders of the House and Senate, announces the Joint Resolution to Authorize the Use of United States Armed Forces Against Iraq, October 2, 2002.

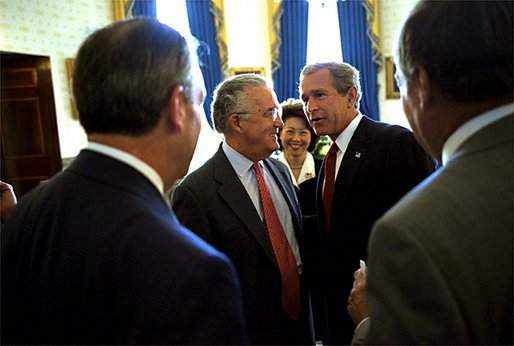
Before the signing ceremony of the Sarbanes–Oxley Act, President George W. Bush met with Senator Paul Sarbanes, Secretary of Labor Elaine Chao and other dignitaries in the Blue Room at the White House on July 30, 2002

The 107th United States Congress was a meeting of the legislative branch of the United States federal government, composed of the United States Senate and the United States House of Representatives. It met in Washington, D.C., from January 3, 2001, to January 3, 2003, during the final weeks of the Clinton presidency and the first two years of the George W. Bush presidency. The apportionment of seats in this House of Representatives was based on the 1990 United States census.

The House of Representatives had a Republican majority throughout the session, while the Senate was tied 50–50 for only the second time in history resulting in numerous changes in the majority. Vice President Al Gore gave Democrats a majority for 17 days, then a Republican majority after Dick Cheney became Vice President on January 20, 2001. Senator Jim Jeffords (R-VT) became an independent who caucused with the Democrats on June 6, 2001, giving the party a 51–49 majority for the rest of the Congress.

When Bush was sworn in as president on January 20, the Republicans held a federal trifecta for the first time since the 83rd Congress in 1955.

== Major events ==
A rare even split in the United States Senate, the defection of a Senator, and the inauguration of a new Vice President, led to three changes in majorities.

- January 3, 2001: The 107th Congress officially begins, with the Senate split 50–50. Democrat Al Gore — the outgoing Vice President — briefly gives the Democrats a majority.
- January 3, 2001: First Lady Hillary Clinton, wife of outgoing President Bill Clinton, became the first, and, to date, only presidential spouse to hold political office (briefly serving as both First Lady and Senator).
- January 6, 2001: A joint session to count the presidential Electoral College votes of the 2000 presidential election.
- January 20, 2001: George W. Bush was sworn in as the 43rd President of the United States; simultaneously, Dick Cheney was sworn in as the 46th Vice President, giving Republicans a Senate majority.
- February 27, 2001: President Bush addressed a joint session of Congress.
- May 24, 2001: Senator Jim Jeffords left the Republican Party, becoming an independent who caucused with the Democrats, giving them a majority from June 6.
- September 11, 2001: The September 11 attacks occurred.
- September 20, 2001: President Bush addressed a joint session of Congress, announcing the investigation into the September 11 attacks.
- October 7, 2001: Operation Enduring Freedom began with airstrikes against the Taliban.
- October 9, 2001: Anthrax spores were mailed to, among others, two Senators, Majority Leader Tom Daschle (D-SD) and Patrick Leahy (D-VT).
- December 2001: Accounting scandals arise from the financial practices of Enron and WorldCom.
- June 12, 2002: John Howard, the Prime Minister of Australia, addressed a joint session of Congress. The address was originally scheduled for September 12, 2001, but was postponed after the September 11 attacks.
- September 6, 2002: Over 300 members of both houses of Congress meet in Federal Hall, New York City, to mark the first anniversary of the September 11 attacks and memorialize the victims.
- October 25, 2002: Senator Paul Wellstone (D-MN), dies in a plane crash, and non-caucusing Independence Party member Dean Barkley is appointed to hold the seat until a special election was held.
- November 23, 2002: Jim Talent wins the United States Senate special election for a Missouri seat, giving Republicans the majority once again (though formal reorganization was delayed until the 108th United States Congress convened).

== Major legislation ==
- June 7, 2001: Economic Growth and Tax Relief Reconciliation Act, Pub. L. 107–16 (text) (PDF), 115 Stat. 38
- September 18, 2001: Authorization for Use of Military Force of 2001, Pub.L. 107-40
- September 22, 2001: Air Transportation Safety and System Stabilization Act, Pub.L. 107-42
- September 28, 2001: Jordan–United States Free Trade Agreement, Pub.L. 107-43
- October 26, 2001: "USA PATRIOT" Act, Pub. L. 107–56 (text) (PDF), 115 Stat. 272
- October 27, 2001: International Money Laundering Abatement and Financial Anti-Terrorism Act of 2001, Pub.L. 107-57
- November 19, 2001: Aviation and Transportation Security Act, Pub.L. 107-71
- December 18, 2001: MD-Care Act, Pub.L. 107-84
- December 21, 2001: Zimbabwe Democracy and Economic Recovery Act of 2001, Pub.L. 107-99
- January 8, 2002: No Child Left Behind Act, Pub. L. 107–110 (text) (PDF), 115 Stat. 1425
- January 8, 2002: District of Columbia Police Coordination Amendment Act of 2001, Pub.L. 107-113
- January 11, 2002: Small Business Liability Relief and Brownfields Revitalization Act, Pub. L. 107–118 (text) (PDF), 115 Stat. 2356
- March 9, 2002: Job Creation and Worker Assistance Act, Pub. L. 107–147 (text) (PDF), 116 Stat. 21
- March 27, 2002: Bipartisan Campaign Reform Act (McCain-Feingold), Pub. L. 107–155 (text) (PDF), 116 Stat. 81
- May 13, 2002: Farm Security and Rural Investment Act of 2002, Pub. L. 107–171 (text) (PDF), 116 Stat. 134
- May 14, 2002: Hematological Cancer Research Investment and Education Act, Pub.L. 107-172
- May 14, 2002: Enhanced Border Security and Visa Entry Reform Act of 2002, Pub.L. 107-173
- May 15, 2002: Notification and Federal Employee Antidiscrimination and Retaliation (No-FEAR) Act of 2002, Pub.L. 107-174
- July 30, 2002: Sarbanes–Oxley Act, Pub. L. 107–204 (text) (PDF), 116 Stat. 745
- August 5, 2002: Born-Alive Infants Protection Act of 2002, Pub.L. 107-207
- August 6, 2002: Trade Act of 2002, Pub. L. 107–210 (text) (PDF), 116 Stat. 933
- October 1, 2002: National Construction Safety Team Act, Pub.L. 107-231
- October 16, 2002: Authorization for Use of Military Force Against Iraq, Pub. L. 107–243 (text) (PDF), 116 Stat. 1497
- October 21, 2002: Sudan Peace Act, Pub. L. 107–245 (text) (PDF), 116 Stat. 1504
- October 29, 2002: Help America Vote Act, Pub. L. 107–252 (text) (PDF), 116 Stat. 1666
- November 6, 2002: Rare Diseases Act of 2002, Pub.L. 107-280
- November 25, 2002: Maritime Transportation Security Act of 2002, Pub.L. 107-295
- November 25, 2002: Homeland Security Act, Pub. L. 107–296 (text) (PDF), 116 Stat. 2135
- November 26, 2002: Terrorism Risk Insurance Act of 2002, Pub.L. 107-297
- December 17, 2002: E-Government Act of 2002, Pub. L. 107–347 (text) (PDF), 116 Stat. 2899

== Party summary ==
=== Senate ===
Senate membership

Final (from December 2, 2002)

January 3, 2001 – January 20, 2001

January 20, 2001 – June 6, 2001

June 6, 2001 – October 25, 2002

October 25, 2002 – November 4, 2002

November 4, 2002 – November 23, 2002

November 23, 2002 – November 30, 2002

November 30, 2002 – December 2, 2002

	Party (Shading indicates party control)				Total	
	Democratic	Independent	Independence	Republican	Total	Vacant
End of previous Congress	46	0	0	54	100	0
Begin (Note: Al Gore (D) was U.S. Vice President until January 20, 2001, with the tie-breaking vote.)	50	0	0	50	100	0
January 20, 2001 (Note: Dick Cheney (R) became U.S. Vice President January 20, 2001, with the tie-breaking vote.)	50	0	0	50	100	0
June 6, 2001 (Note: In Vermont, Senator Jim Jeffords switched June 6, 2001, from Republican to Independent and caucused with Democrats.)	50	1	0	49	100	0
October 25, 2002 (Note: In Minnesota, Paul Wellstone (D) died October 25, 2002. Dean Barkley (IMN), who did not caucus with either party, was appointed November 4, 2002, to Wellstone's seat.)	49	1	0	49	99	1
November 4, 2002	49	1	1	49	100	0
November 23, 2002 (Note: In the November 5, 2002 Missouri special election, Jim Talent (R) took Jean Carnahan (D)'s seat and became senator November 23, 2002, but there was no reorganization because Senate was out of session.)	48	1	1	50	100	0
November 30, 2002 (Note: In Texas, Phil Gramm (R) resigned November 30, 2002, to give his successor advantageous office space. Senator-elect John Cornyn (R) was appointed December 2, 2002, to finish Gramm's term.)	48	1	1	49	99	1
December 2, 2002	48	1	1	50	100	0
Final voting share	49%		1%	50%		
Beginning of the next Congress	48	1	0	51	100	0

=== House of Representatives ===
	Party (Shading indicates majority caucus)				Total	
	Democratic	Independent		Republican	Total	Vacant
	Democratic	caucused with Democrats	caucused with Republicans	Republican	Total	Vacant
End of previous Congress	208	1	1	222	432	3
Begin	211	1	1	221	434	1
January 31, 2001	211	1	1	220	433	2
March 30, 2001	210	1	1	220	432	3
May 15, 2001	210	1	1	221	433	2
May 28, 2001	209	1	1	221	432	3
June 5, 2001	210	1	1	221	433	2
June 19, 2001	210	1	1	222	434	1
August 5, 2001	210	1	1	221	433	2
August 16, 2001	210	1	1	220	432	3
September 6, 2001	210	1	1	219	431	4
October 16, 2001	211	1	1	220	433	2
November 20, 2001	211	1	1	221	434	1
December 18, 2001	211	1	1	222	435	0
July 24, 2002	210	1	1	222	434	1
August 1, 2002	210	1	0	223	434	1
September 9, 2002	209	1	0	223	433	2
September 28, 2002	208	1	0	223	432	3
November 30, 2002	209	1	0	223	433	2
Final voting share	48.5%		51.5%			
Beginning of the next Congress	205	1	0	229	435	0

== Leadership ==
=== Senate ===
Senate President

Al Gore (D)
(until January 20, 2001)

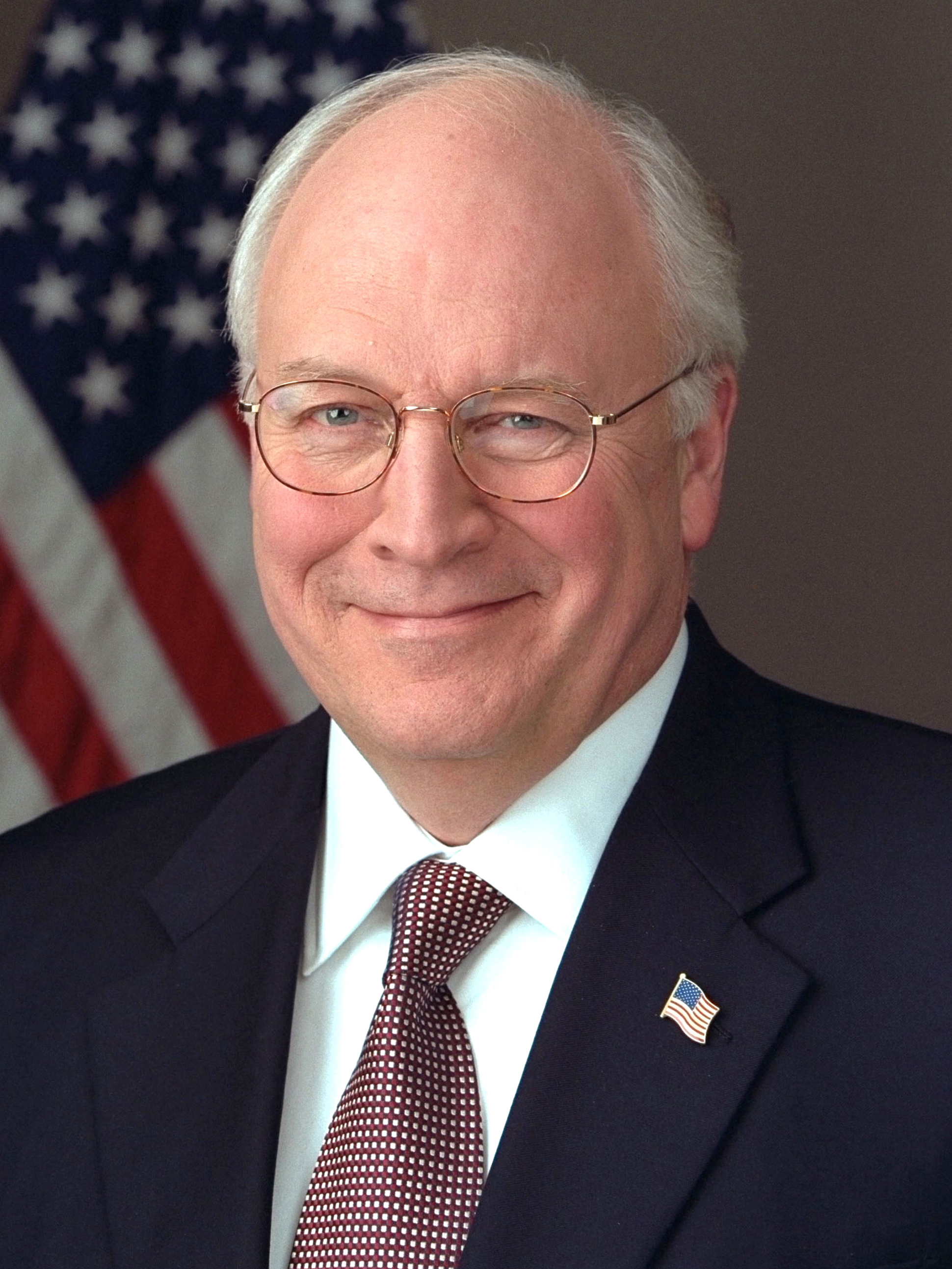
Dick Cheney (R)
(from January 20, 2001)

Senate President pro tempore

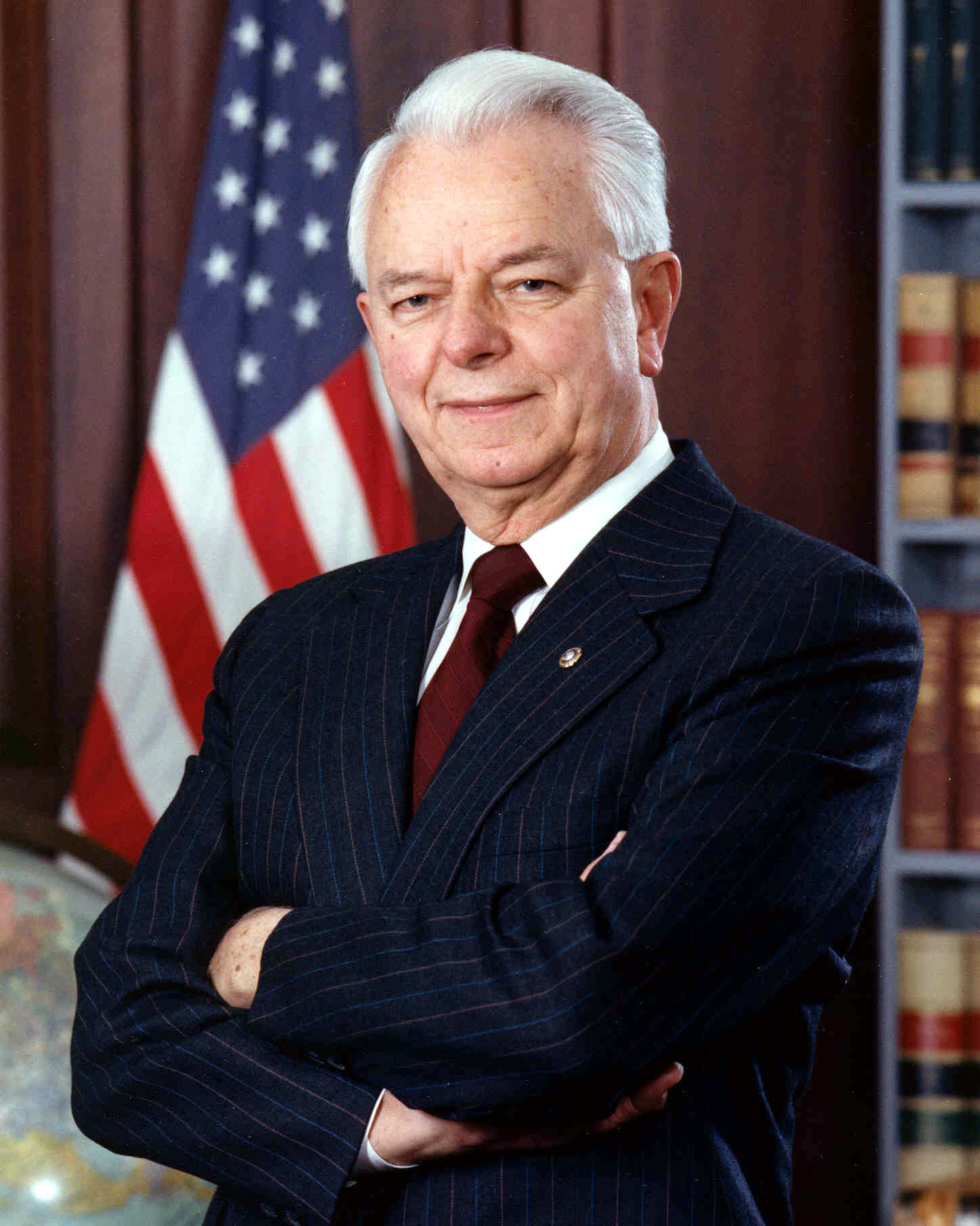
Robert Byrd (D)
(until January 20, 2001)
(from June 6, 2001)

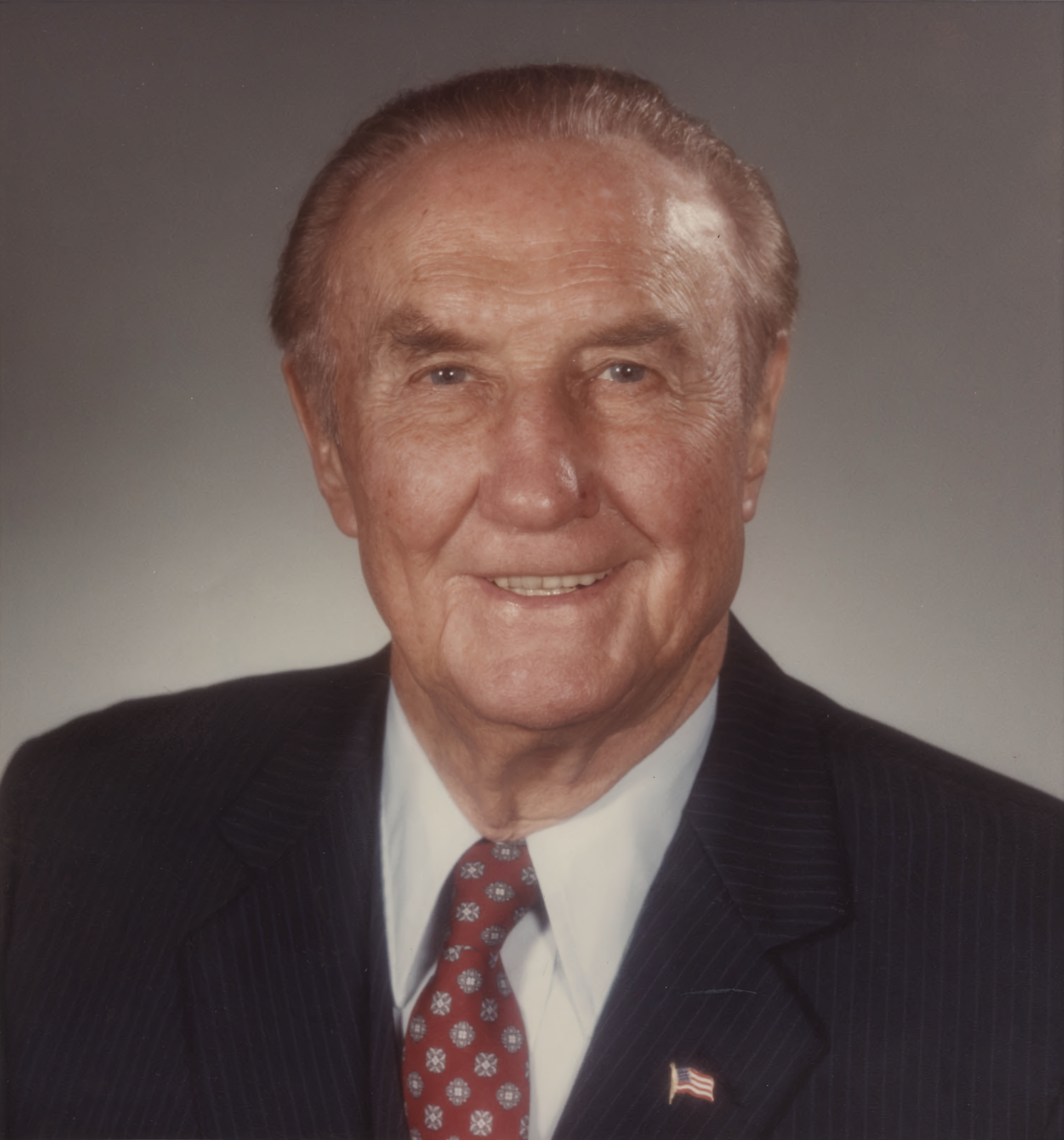
Strom Thurmond (R)
(January 20 – June 6, 2001)

- President: Al Gore (D), until January 20, 2001
  - Dick Cheney (R), from January 20, 2001
- President pro tempore: Robert Byrd (D), until January 20, 2001
  - Strom Thurmond (R), January 20 – June 6, 2001
  - Robert Byrd (D), from June 6, 2001

==== Republican leadership ====
- Minority Leader: Trent Lott (R), until January 20, 2001, and from June 6, 2001
  - Majority leader January 20 – June 6, 2001
- Minority Whip: Don Nickles (R), until January 20, 2001, and from June 6, 2001
  - Majority whip January 20 – June 6, 2001
- Republican Conference Chairman: Rick Santorum
- Republican Conference Secretary: Kay Bailey Hutchison
- Republican Campaign Committee Chair: Bill Frist
- Republican Policy Committee Chairman: Larry Craig

==== Democratic leadership ====
- Majority Leader: Tom Daschle (D), until January 20, 2001, and from June 6, 2001
  - Minority leader January 20 – June 6, 2001
- Majority Whip: Harry Reid (D), until January 20, 2001, and from June 6, 2001
  - Minority whip January 20 – June 6, 2001
- Democratic Policy Committee Chairman: Byron Dorgan
- Democratic Conference Secretary: Barbara Mikulski
- Democratic Campaign Committee Chairman: Patty Murray
- Democratic Chief Deputy Whip: John Breaux

=== House of Representatives ===
Speaker of the House

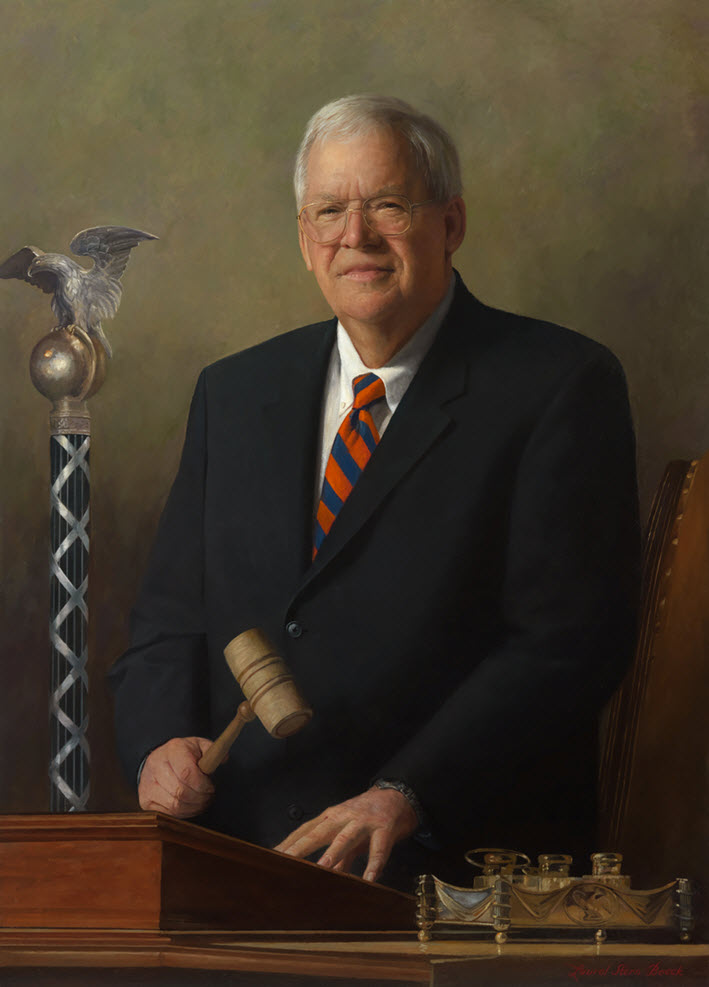
Dennis Hastert (R)

- Speaker: Dennis Hastert (R)

==== Majority (Republican) leadership ====
- Majority Leader: Dick Armey
- Majority Whip: Tom DeLay
- Chief Deputy Whip: Roy Blunt
- Republican Conference Chairman: J. C. Watts
- Republican Conference Vice-Chairman: Deborah Pryce
- Republican Conference Secretary: Barbara Cubin
- Policy Committee Chairman: Christopher Cox
- Republican Campaign Committee Chairman: Thomas M. Davis
- House Rules Committee Chairman: David Dreier

==== Minority (Democratic) leadership ====
- Minority Leader: Dick Gephardt
- Minority Whip: David E. Bonior, until January 15, 2002
  - Nancy Pelosi, from January 15, 2002
- Chief Deputy Minority Whips: John Lewis, Ed Pastor, Max Sandlin & Maxine Waters
- Democratic Caucus Chairman: Martin Frost
- Democratic Caucus Vice Chairman: Bob Menendez
- Democratic Campaign Committee Chairman: Nita Lowey

== Members ==
Skip to House of Representatives, below

=== Senate ===
Senators are listed by their class. In this Congress, Class 2 meant their term ended with this Congress, facing re-election in 2002; Class 3 meant their term began in the previous Congress, facing re-election in 2004; and Class 1 meant their term began in this Congress, facing re-election in 2006.

==== Alabama ====
▌2. Jeff Sessions (R)
▌3. Richard Shelby (R)

==== Alaska ====
▌2. Ted Stevens (R)
▌3. Frank Murkowski (R), until December 2, 2002

▌Lisa Murkowski (R), from December 20, 2002

==== Arizona ====
▌1. Jon Kyl (R)
▌3. John McCain (R)

==== Arkansas ====
▌2. Tim Hutchinson (R)
▌3. Blanche Lincoln (D)

==== California ====
▌1. Dianne Feinstein (D)
▌3. Barbara Boxer (D)

==== Colorado ====
▌2. Wayne Allard (R)
▌3. Ben Nighthorse Campbell (R)

==== Connecticut ====
▌1. Joe Lieberman (D)
▌3. Chris Dodd (D)

==== Delaware ====
▌1. Tom Carper (D)
▌2. Joe Biden (D)

==== Florida ====
▌1. Bill Nelson (D)
▌3. Bob Graham (D)

==== Georgia ====
▌2. Max Cleland (D)
▌3. Zell Miller (D)

==== Hawaii ====
▌1. Daniel Akaka (D)
▌3. Daniel Inouye (D)

==== Idaho ====
▌2. Larry Craig (R)
▌3. Mike Crapo (R)

==== Illinois ====
▌2. Richard Durbin (D)
▌3. Peter Fitzgerald (R)

==== Indiana ====
▌1. Richard Lugar (R)
▌3. Evan Bayh (D)

==== Iowa ====
▌2. Tom Harkin (D)
▌3. Chuck Grassley (R)

==== Kansas ====
▌2. Pat Roberts (R)
▌3. Sam Brownback (R)

==== Kentucky ====
▌2. Mitch McConnell (R)
▌3. Jim Bunning (R)

==== Louisiana ====
▌2. Mary Landrieu (D)
▌3. John Breaux (D)

==== Maine ====
▌1. Olympia Snowe (R)
▌2. Susan Collins (R)

==== Maryland ====
▌1. Paul Sarbanes (D)
▌3. Barbara Mikulski (D)

==== Massachusetts ====
▌1. Ted Kennedy (D)
▌2. John Kerry (D)

==== Michigan ====
▌1. Debbie Stabenow (D)
▌2. Carl Levin (D)

==== Minnesota ====
▌1. Mark Dayton (DFL)
▌2. Paul Wellstone (DFL), until October 25, 2002

▌Dean Barkley (IPM), from November 4, 2002

==== Mississippi ====
▌1. Trent Lott (R)
▌2. Thad Cochran (R)

==== Missouri ====
▌1. Jean Carnahan (D) (Note: In Missouri, Senator-elect Mel Carnahan (D) died October 16, 2000, but had won the 2000 Senate election posthumously.), until November 23, 2002

▌Jim Talent (R), from November 23, 2002

▌3. Kit Bond (R)

==== Montana ====
▌1. Conrad Burns (R)
▌2. Max Baucus (D)

==== Nebraska ====
▌1. Ben Nelson (D)
▌2. Chuck Hagel (R)

==== Nevada ====
▌1. John Ensign (R)
▌3. Harry Reid (D)

==== New Hampshire ====
▌2. Bob Smith (R)
▌3. Judd Gregg (R)

==== New Jersey ====
▌1. Jon Corzine (D)
▌2. Robert Torricelli (D)

==== New Mexico ====
▌1. Jeff Bingaman (D)
▌2. Pete Domenici (R)

==== New York ====
▌1. Hillary Clinton (D)
▌3. Chuck Schumer (D)

==== North Carolina ====
▌2. Jesse Helms (R)
▌3. John Edwards (D)

==== North Dakota ====
▌1. Kent Conrad (D-NPL)
▌3. Byron Dorgan (D-NPL)

==== Ohio ====
▌1. Mike DeWine (R)
▌3. George Voinovich (R)

==== Oklahoma ====
▌2. James Inhofe (R)
▌3. Don Nickles (R)

==== Oregon ====
▌2. Gordon Smith (R)
▌3. Ron Wyden (D)

==== Pennsylvania ====
▌1. Rick Santorum (R)
▌3. Arlen Specter (R)

==== Rhode Island ====
▌1. Lincoln Chafee (R)
▌2. Jack Reed (D)

==== South Carolina ====
▌2. Strom Thurmond (R)
▌3. Fritz Hollings (D)

==== South Dakota ====
▌2. Tim Johnson (D)
▌3. Tom Daschle (D)

==== Tennessee ====
▌1. Bill Frist (R)
▌2. Fred Thompson (R)

==== Texas ====
▌1. Kay Bailey Hutchison (R)
▌2. Phil Gramm (R), until November 30, 2002

▌John Cornyn (R), from December 2, 2002

==== Utah ====
▌1. Orrin Hatch (R)
▌3. Bob Bennett (R)

==== Vermont ====
▌▌1. Jim Jeffords (R until June 6, 2001, then I)
▌3. Patrick Leahy (D)

==== Virginia ====
▌1. George Allen (R)
▌2. John Warner (R)

==== Washington ====
▌1. Maria Cantwell (D)
▌3. Patty Murray (D)

==== West Virginia ====
▌1. Robert Byrd (D)
▌2. Jay Rockefeller (D)

==== Wisconsin ====
▌1. Herb Kohl (D)
▌3. Russ Feingold (D)

==== Wyoming ====
▌1. Craig L. Thomas (R)
▌2. Mike Enzi (R)

Senators' party membership by state at the opening of the 107th Congress in January 2001 2 Democrats 1 Democrat and 1 Republican 2 Republicans

Senate majority leadership
(Majority until January 20 and minority until June 6, 2001; majority thereafter)

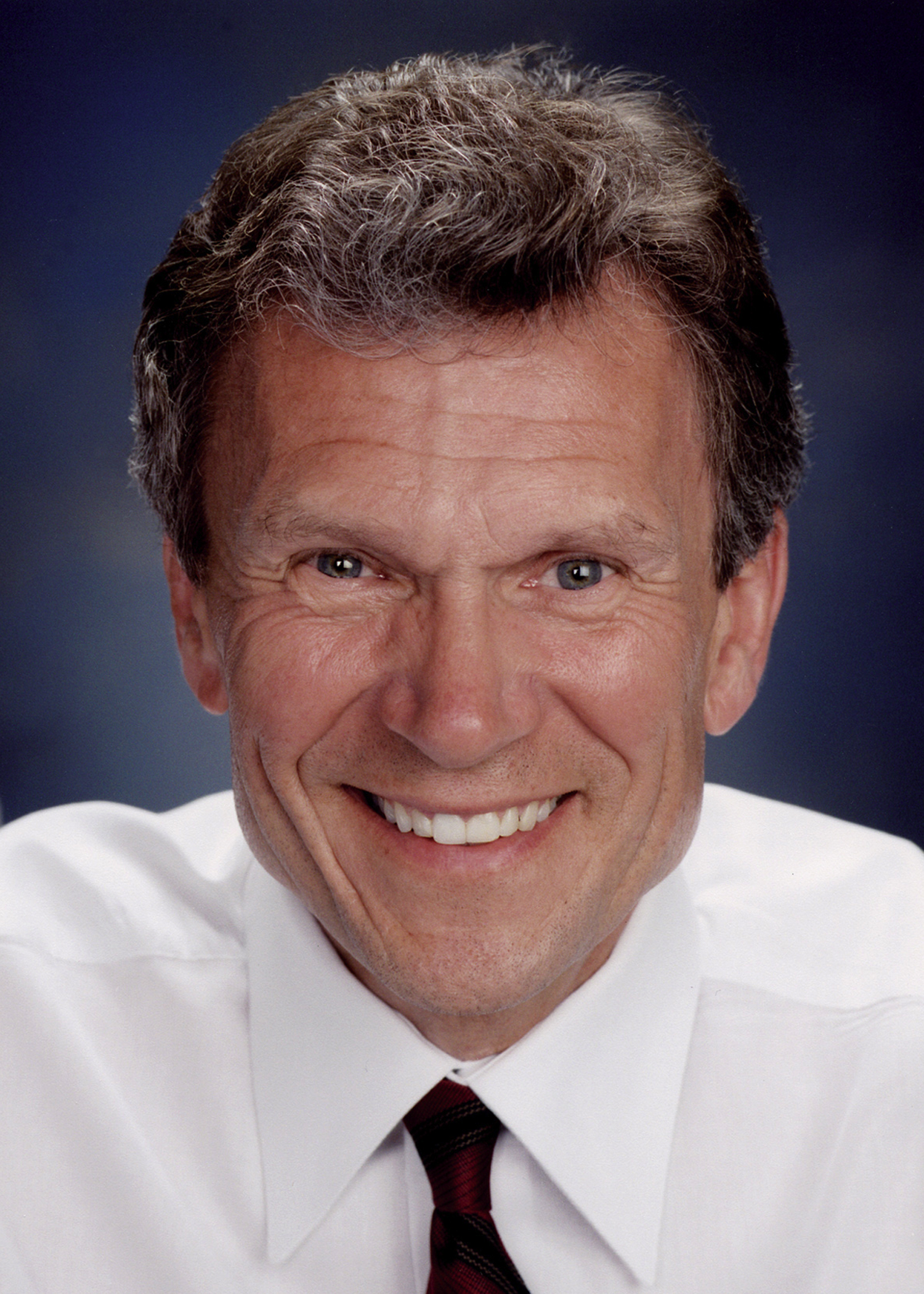
Democratic leader
Tom Daschle

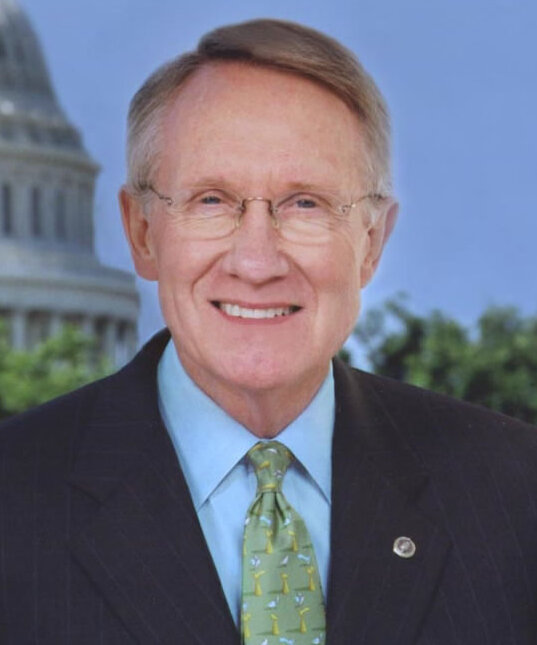
Democratic whip
Harry Reid

Senate minority leadership
(Minority until January 20 and majority until June 6, 2001; minority thereafter)

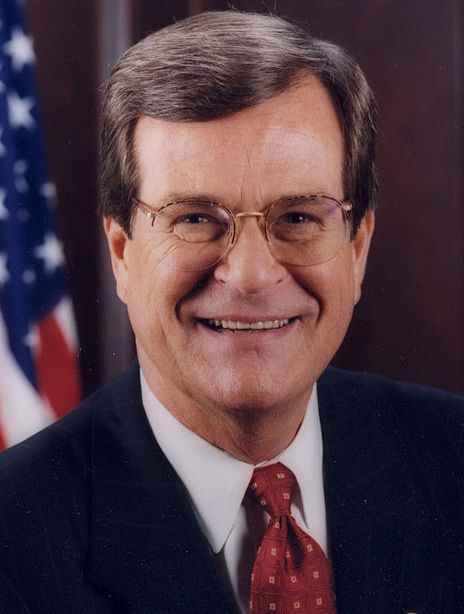
Republican leader
Trent Lott

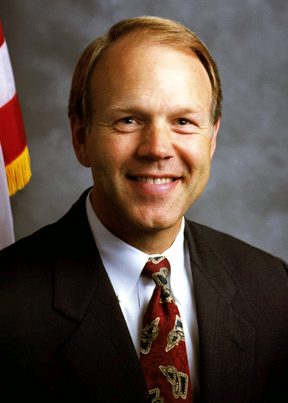
Republican whip
Don Nickles

=== House of Representatives ===
Congressional district numbers are linked to articles describing the district itself.

==== Alabama ====
▌1. Sonny Callahan (R)
▌2. Terry Everett (R)
▌3. Bob Riley (R)
▌4. Robert Aderholt (R)
▌5. Robert E. Cramer (D)
▌6. Spencer Bachus (R)
▌7. Earl Hilliard (D)

==== Alaska ====
▌At Large. Don Young (R)

==== Arizona ====
▌1. Jeff Flake (R)
▌2. Ed Pastor (D)
▌3. Bob Stump (R)
▌4. John Shadegg (R)
▌5. Jim Kolbe (R)
▌6. J. D. Hayworth (R)

==== Arkansas ====
▌1. Robert Marion Berry (D)
▌2. Vic Snyder (D)
▌3. Asa Hutchinson (R), until August 5, 2001

▌John Boozman (R), from November 20, 2001

▌4. Mike Ross (D)

==== California ====
▌1. Mike Thompson (D)
▌2. Wally Herger (R)
▌3. Doug Ose (R)
▌4. John Doolittle (R)
▌5. Bob Matsui (D)
▌6. Lynn Woolsey (D)
▌7. George Miller (D)
▌8. Nancy Pelosi (D)
▌9. Barbara Lee (D)
▌10. Ellen Tauscher (D)
▌11. Richard Pombo (R)
▌12. Tom Lantos (D)
▌13. Pete Stark (D)
▌14. Anna Eshoo (D)
▌15. Mike Honda (D)
▌16. Zoe Lofgren (D)
▌17. Sam Farr (D)
▌18. Gary Condit (D)
▌19. George Radanovich (R)
▌20. Cal Dooley (D)
▌21. Bill Thomas (R)
▌22. Lois Capps (D)
▌23. Elton Gallegly (R)
▌24. Brad Sherman (D)
▌25. Howard McKeon (R)
▌26. Howard Berman (D)
▌27. Adam Schiff (D)
▌28. David Dreier (R)
▌29. Henry Waxman (D)
▌30. Xavier Becerra (D)
▌31. Hilda Solis (D)
▌32. Diane Watson (D), from June 5, 2001
▌33. Lucille Roybal-Allard (D)
▌34. Grace Napolitano (D)
▌35. Maxine Waters (D)
▌36. Jane Harman (D)
▌37. Juanita Millender-McDonald (D)
▌38. Steve Horn (R)
▌39. Ed Royce (R)
▌40. Jerry Lewis (R)
▌41. Gary Miller (R)
▌42. Joe Baca (D)
▌43. Ken Calvert (R)
▌44. Mary Bono (R)
▌45. Dana Rohrabacher (R)
▌46. Loretta Sanchez (D)
▌47. Christopher Cox (R)
▌48. Darrell Issa (R)
▌49. Susan Davis (D)
▌50. Bob Filner (D)
▌51. Duke Cunningham (R)
▌52. Duncan L. Hunter (R)

==== Colorado ====
▌1. Diana DeGette (D)
▌2. Mark Udall (D)
▌3. Scott McInnis (R)
▌4. Bob Schaffer (R)
▌5. Joel Hefley (R)
▌6. Tom Tancredo (R)

==== Connecticut ====
▌1. John B. Larson (D)
▌2. Rob Simmons (R)
▌3. Rosa DeLauro (D)
▌4. Chris Shays (R)
▌5. James H. Maloney (D)
▌6. Nancy Johnson (R)

==== Delaware ====
▌At Large. Mike Castle (R)

==== Florida ====
▌1. Joe Scarborough (R), until September 6, 2001

▌Jeff Miller (R), from October 16, 2001

▌2. Allen Boyd (D)
▌3. Corrine Brown (D)
▌4. Ander Crenshaw (R)
▌5. Karen Thurman (D)
▌6. Cliff Stearns (R)
▌7. John Mica (R)
▌8. Ric Keller (R)
▌9. Michael Bilirakis (R)
▌10. Bill Young (R)
▌11. Jim Davis (D)
▌12. Adam Putnam (R)
▌13. Dan Miller (R)
▌14. Porter Goss (R)
▌15. Dave Weldon (R)
▌16. Mark Foley (R)
▌17. Carrie Meek (D)
▌18. Ileana Ros-Lehtinen (R)
▌19. Robert Wexler (D)
▌20. Peter Deutsch (D)
▌21. Lincoln Diaz-Balart (R)
▌22. Clay Shaw (R)
▌23. Alcee Hastings (D)

==== Georgia ====
▌1. Jack Kingston (R)
▌2. Sanford Bishop (D)
▌3. Mac Collins (R)
▌4. Cynthia McKinney (D)
▌5. John Lewis (D)
▌6. Johnny Isakson (R)
▌7. Bob Barr (R)
▌8. Saxby Chambliss (R)
▌9. Nathan Deal (R)
▌10. Charlie Norwood (R)
▌11. John Linder (R)

==== Hawaii ====
▌1. Neil Abercrombie (D)
▌2. Patsy Mink (D), until September 28, 2002

▌Ed Case (D), from November 30, 2002

==== Idaho ====
▌1. Butch Otter (R)
▌2. Mike Simpson (R)

==== Illinois ====
▌1. Bobby Rush (D)
▌2. Jesse Jackson Jr. (D)
▌3. Bill Lipinski (D)
▌4. Luis Gutierrez (D)
▌5. Rod Blagojevich (D)
▌6. Henry Hyde (R)
▌7. Danny K. Davis (D)
▌8. Philip Crane (R)
▌9. Jan Schakowsky (D)
▌10. Mark Kirk (R)
▌11. Jerry Weller (R)
▌12. Jerry Costello (D)
▌13. Judy Biggert (R)
▌14. Dennis Hastert (R)
▌15. Tim Johnson (R)
▌16. Don Manzullo (R)
▌17. Lane Evans (D)
▌18. Ray LaHood (R)
▌19. David D. Phelps (D)
▌20. John Shimkus (R)

==== Indiana ====
▌1. Pete Visclosky (D)
▌2. Mike Pence (R)
▌3. Tim Roemer (D)
▌4. Mark Souder (R)
▌5. Steve Buyer (R)
▌6. Dan Burton (R)
▌7. Brian D. Kerns (R)
▌8. John Hostettler (R)
▌9. Baron Hill (D)
▌10. Julia Carson (D)

==== Iowa ====
▌1. Jim Leach (R)
▌2. Jim Nussle (R)
▌3. Leonard Boswell (D)
▌4. Greg Ganske (R)
▌5. Tom Latham (R)

==== Kansas ====
▌1. Jerry Moran (R)
▌2. Jim Ryun (R)
▌3. Dennis Moore (D)
▌4. Todd Tiahrt (R)

==== Kentucky ====
▌1. Ed Whitfield (R)
▌2. Ron Lewis (R)
▌3. Anne Northup (R)
▌4. Ken Lucas (D)
▌5. Hal Rogers (R)
▌6. Ernie Fletcher (R)

==== Louisiana ====
▌1. David Vitter (R)
▌2. William J. Jefferson (D)
▌3. Billy Tauzin (R)
▌4. Jim McCrery (R)
▌5. John Cooksey (R)
▌6. Richard H. Baker (R)
▌7. Chris John (D)

==== Maine ====
▌1. Tom Allen (D)
▌2. John Baldacci (D)

==== Maryland ====
▌1. Wayne Gilchrest (R)
▌2. Bob Ehrlich (R)
▌3. Ben Cardin (D)
▌4. Albert Wynn (D)
▌5. Steny Hoyer (D)
▌6. Roscoe Bartlett (R)
▌7. Elijah Cummings (D)
▌8. Connie Morella (R)

==== Massachusetts ====
▌1. John Olver (D)
▌2. Richard Neal (D)
▌3. Jim McGovern (D)
▌4. Barney Frank (D)
▌5. Marty Meehan (D)
▌6. John F. Tierney (D)
▌7. Ed Markey (D)
▌8. Mike Capuano (D)
▌9. Joe Moakley (D) until May 28, 2001

▌Stephen Lynch (D), from October 16, 2001

▌10. Bill Delahunt (D)

==== Michigan ====
▌1. Bart Stupak (D)
▌2. Peter Hoekstra (R)
▌3. Vern Ehlers (R)
▌4. Dave Camp (R)
▌5. James A. Barcia (D)
▌6. Fred Upton (R)
▌7. Nick Smith (R)
▌8. Mike Rogers (R)
▌9. Dale Kildee (D)
▌10. David Bonior (D)
▌11. Joe Knollenberg (R)
▌12. Sander Levin (D)
▌13. Lynn Rivers (D)
▌14. John Conyers (D)
▌15. Carolyn Cheeks Kilpatrick (D)
▌16. John Dingell (D)

==== Minnesota ====
▌1. Gil Gutknecht (R)
▌2. Mark Kennedy (R)
▌3. Jim Ramstad (R)
▌4. Betty McCollum (DFL)
▌5. Martin Olav Sabo (DFL)
▌6. Bill Luther (DFL)
▌7. Collin Peterson (DFL)
▌8. Jim Oberstar (DFL)

==== Mississippi ====
▌1. Roger Wicker (R)
▌2. Bennie Thompson (D)
▌3. Chip Pickering (R)
▌4. Ronnie Shows (D)
▌5. Gene Taylor (D)

==== Missouri ====
▌1. Lacy Clay (D)
▌2. Todd Akin (R)
▌3. Dick Gephardt (D)
▌4. Ike Skelton (D)
▌5. Karen McCarthy (D)
▌6. Sam Graves (R)
▌7. Roy Blunt (R)
▌8. Jo Ann Emerson (R)
▌9. Kenny Hulshof (R)

==== Montana ====
▌At Large. Denny Rehberg (R)

==== Nebraska ====
▌1. Doug Bereuter (R)
▌2. Lee Terry (R)
▌3. Tom Osborne (R)

==== Nevada ====
▌1. Shelley Berkley (D)
▌2. Jim Gibbons (R)

==== New Hampshire ====
▌1. John E. Sununu (R)
▌2. Charles Bass (R)

==== New Jersey ====
▌1. Rob Andrews (D)
▌2. Frank LoBiondo (R)
▌3. Jim Saxton (R)
▌4. Chris Smith (R)
▌5. Marge Roukema (R)
▌6. Frank Pallone (D)
▌7. Mike Ferguson (R)
▌8. Bill Pascrell (D)
▌9. Steve Rothman (D)
▌10. Donald M. Payne (D)
▌11. Rodney Frelinghuysen (R)
▌12. Rush Holt Jr. (D)
▌13. Bob Menendez (D)

==== New Mexico ====
▌1. Heather Wilson (R)
▌2. Joe Skeen (R)
▌3. Tom Udall (D)

==== New York ====
▌1. Felix Grucci (R)
▌2. Steve Israel (D)
▌3. Peter T. King (R)
▌4. Carolyn McCarthy (D)
▌5. Gary Ackerman (D)
▌6. Gregory Meeks (D)
▌7. Joe Crowley (D)
▌8. Jerry Nadler (D)
▌9. Anthony Weiner (D)
▌10. Edolphus Towns (D)
▌11. Major Owens (D)
▌12. Nydia Velázquez (D)
▌13. Vito Fossella (R)
▌14. Carolyn Maloney (D)
▌15. Charles Rangel (D)
▌16. José E. Serrano (D)
▌17. Eliot Engel (D)
▌18. Nita Lowey (D)
▌19. Sue W. Kelly (R)
▌20. Benjamin Gilman (R)
▌21. Michael R. McNulty (D)
▌22. John E. Sweeney (R)
▌23. Sherwood Boehlert (R)
▌24. John M. McHugh (R)
▌25. James T. Walsh (R)
▌26. Maurice Hinchey (D)
▌27. Thomas M. Reynolds (R)
▌28. Louise Slaughter (D)
▌29. John LaFalce (D)
▌30. Jack Quinn (R)
▌31. Amo Houghton (R)

==== North Carolina ====
▌1. Eva Clayton (D)
▌2. Bob Etheridge (D)
▌3. Walter B. Jones Jr. (R)
▌4. David Price (D)
▌5. Richard Burr (R)
▌6. Howard Coble (R)
▌7. Mike McIntyre (D)
▌8. Robin Hayes (R)
▌9. Sue Myrick (R)
▌10. Cass Ballenger (R)
▌11. Charles Taylor (R)
▌12. Mel Watt (D)

==== North Dakota ====
▌At Large. Earl Pomeroy (D-NPL)

==== Ohio ====
▌1. Steve Chabot (R)
▌2. Rob Portman (R)
▌3. Tony P. Hall (D), until September 9, 2002, vacant thereafter
▌4. Mike Oxley (R)
▌5. Paul Gillmor (R)
▌6. Ted Strickland (D)
▌7. Dave Hobson (R)
▌8. John Boehner (R)
▌9. Marcy Kaptur (D)
▌10. Dennis Kucinich (D)
▌11. Stephanie Tubbs Jones (D)
▌12. Pat Tiberi (R)
▌13. Sherrod Brown (D)
▌14. Thomas C. Sawyer (D)
▌15. Deborah Pryce (R)
▌16. Ralph Regula (R)
▌17. James Traficant (D), until July 24, 2002, vacant thereafter
▌18. Bob Ney (R)
▌19. Steve LaTourette (R)

==== Oklahoma ====
▌1. Steve Largent (R), until February 15, 2002

▌John Sullivan (R), from February 15, 2002

▌2. Brad Carson (D)
▌3. Wes Watkins (R)
▌4. J. C. Watts (R)
▌5. Ernest Istook (R)
▌6. Frank Lucas (R)

==== Oregon ====
▌1. David Wu (D)
▌2. Greg Walden (R)
▌3. Earl Blumenauer (D)
▌4. Peter DeFazio (D)
▌5. Darlene Hooley (D)

==== Pennsylvania ====
▌1. Bob Brady (D)
▌2. Chaka Fattah (D)
▌3. Robert A. Borski Jr. (D)
▌4. Melissa Hart (R)
▌5. John E. Peterson (R)
▌6. Tim Holden (D)
▌7. Curt Weldon (R)
▌8. James C. Greenwood (R)
▌9. Bud Shuster (R), until February 3, 2001

▌Bill Shuster (R), from May 15, 2001

▌10. Don Sherwood (R)
▌11. Paul Kanjorski (D)
▌12. John Murtha (D)
▌13. Joe Hoeffel (D)
▌14. William J. Coyne (D)
▌15. Pat Toomey (R)
▌16. Joe Pitts (R)
▌17. George Gekas (R)
▌18. Mike Doyle (D)
▌19. Todd Russell Platts (R)
▌20. Frank Mascara (D)
▌21. Phil English (R)

==== Rhode Island ====
▌1. Patrick J. Kennedy (D)
▌2. James Langevin (D)

==== South Carolina ====
▌1. Henry E. Brown Jr. (R)
▌2. Floyd Spence (R), until August 16, 2001

▌Joe Wilson (R), from December 18, 2001

▌3. Lindsey Graham (R)
▌4. Jim DeMint (R)
▌5. John Spratt (D)
▌6. Jim Clyburn (D)

==== South Dakota ====
▌At Large. John Thune (R)

==== Tennessee ====
▌1. Bill Jenkins (R)
▌2. Jimmy Duncan (R)
▌3. Zach Wamp (R)
▌4. Van Hilleary (R)
▌5. Bob Clement (D)
▌6. Bart Gordon (D)
▌7. Ed Bryant (R)
▌8. John S. Tanner (D)
▌9. Harold Ford Jr. (D)

==== Texas ====
▌1. Max Sandlin (D)
▌2. Jim Turner (D)
▌3. Sam Johnson (R)
▌4. Ralph Hall (D)
▌5. Pete Sessions (R)
▌6. Joe Barton (R)
▌7. John Culberson (R)
▌8. Kevin Brady (R)
▌9. Nick Lampson (D)
▌10. Lloyd Doggett (D)
▌11. Chet Edwards (D)
▌12. Kay Granger (R)
▌13. Mac Thornberry (R)
▌14. Ron Paul (R)
▌15. Rubén Hinojosa (D)
▌16. Silvestre Reyes (D)
▌17. Charles Stenholm (D)
▌18. Sheila Jackson Lee (D)
▌19. Larry Combest (R)
▌20. Charlie Gonzalez (D)
▌21. Lamar Smith (R)
▌22. Tom DeLay (R)
▌23. Henry Bonilla (R)
▌24. Martin Frost (D)
▌25. Ken Bentsen (D)
▌26. Dick Armey (R)
▌27. Solomon P. Ortiz (D)
▌28. Ciro Rodriguez (D)
▌29. Gene Green (D)
▌30. Eddie Bernice Johnson (D)

==== Utah ====
▌1. James V. Hansen (R)
▌2. Jim Matheson (D)
▌3. Chris Cannon (R)

==== Vermont ====
▌At Large. Bernie Sanders (I)

==== Virginia ====
▌1. Jo Ann Davis (R)
▌2. Ed Schrock (R)
▌3. Bobby Scott (D)
▌4. Norman Sisisky (D), until March 29, 2001

▌Randy Forbes (R), from June 19, 2001

▌5. Virgil Goode (R), (I prior to August 1, 2002)
▌6. Bob Goodlatte (R)
▌7. Eric Cantor (R)
▌8. Jim Moran (D)
▌9. Rick Boucher (D)
▌10. Frank Wolf (R)
▌11. Tom Davis (R)

==== Washington ====
▌1. Jay Inslee (D)
▌2. Rick Larsen (D)
▌3. Brian Baird (D)
▌4. Doc Hastings (R)
▌5. George Nethercutt (R)
▌6. Norman D. Dicks (D)
▌7. Jim McDermott (D)
▌8. Jennifer Dunn (R)
▌9. Adam Smith (D)

==== West Virginia ====
▌1. Alan Mollohan (D)
▌2. Shelley Moore Capito (R)
▌3. Nick Rahall (D)

==== Wisconsin ====
▌1. Paul Ryan (R)
▌2. Tammy Baldwin (D)
▌3. Ron Kind (D)
▌4. Jerry Kleczka (D)
▌5. Tom Barrett (D)
▌6. Tom Petri (R)
▌7. Dave Obey (D)
▌8. Mark Andrew Green (R)
▌9. Jim Sensenbrenner (R)

==== Wyoming ====
▌At Large. Barbara Cubin (R)

==== Non-voting members ====
▌American Samoa. Eni Faleomavaega (D)
▌District of Columbia. Eleanor Holmes Norton (D)
▌Guam. Robert A. Underwood (D)
▌Puerto Rico. Aníbal Acevedo Vilá (Res. Comm.) (D/PPD)
▌Virgin Islands. Donna Christian-Christensen (D)

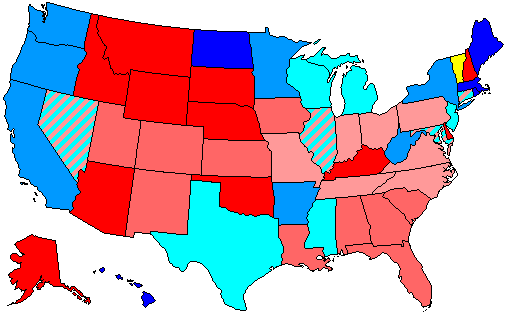
Percentage of House seats held by party Democratic 80+ to 100% Republican 80+ to 100% Democratic 60+ to 80% Republican 60+ to 80% Democratic 50+ to 60% Republican 50+ to 60% 1 Independent

House majority leadership

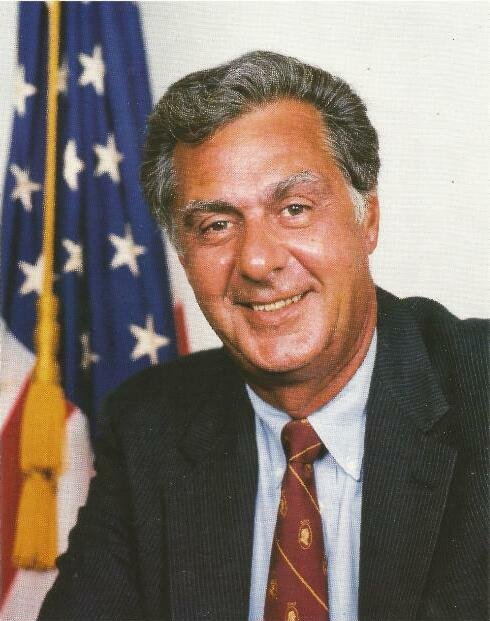
Republican leader
Dick Armey

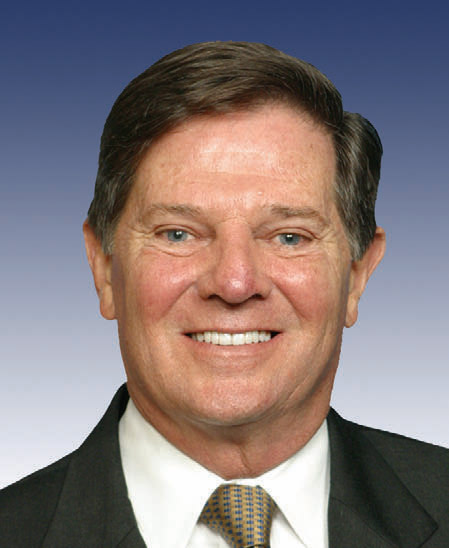
Republican whip
Tom DeLay

House minority leadership

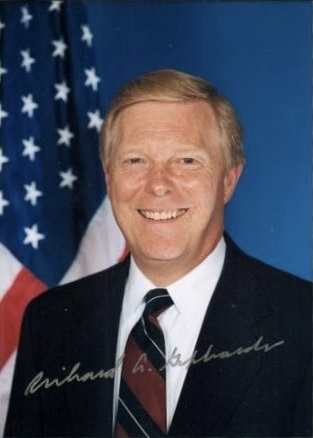
Democratic leader
Dick Gephardt

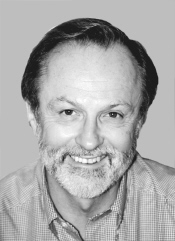
Democratic whip
David Bonior
(until January 15, 2002)

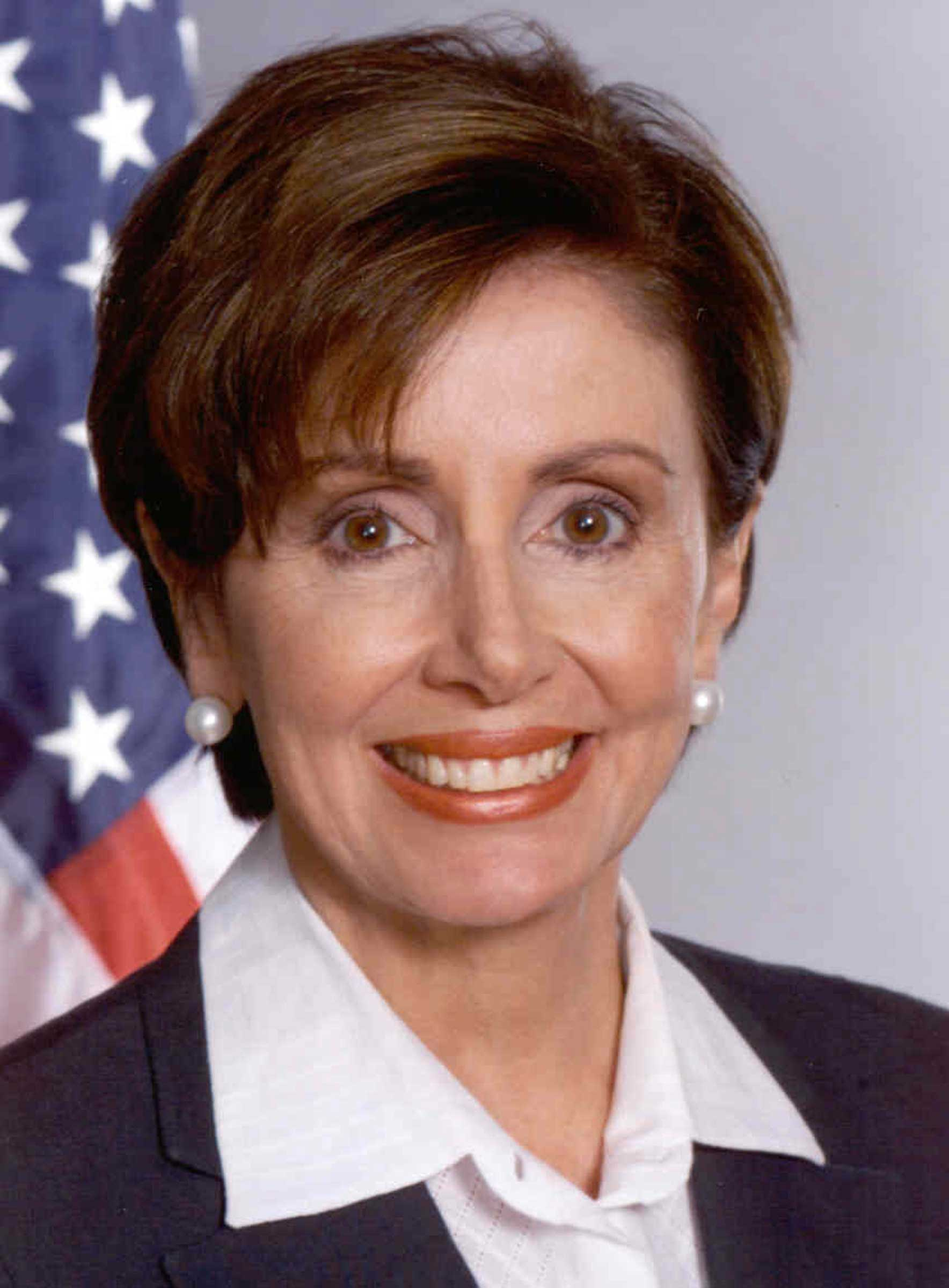
Democratic whip
Nancy Pelosi
(from January 15, 2002)

== Changes in membership ==
=== Senate ===
Senate changes
State (class)	Vacated by	Reason for change	Successor	Date of successor's formal installation (Note: When seated or oath administered, not necessarily when service began.)
Vermont (1)	Jim Jeffords (R)	Incumbent changed party and joined the Democratic caucus.	Jim Jeffords (I)	June 6, 2001
Minnesota (2)	Paul Wellstone (D)	Incumbent died October 25, 2002. Successor appointed to serve the remaining two months of the term.	Dean Barkley (IMN)	November 4, 2002
Missouri (1)	Jean Carnahan (D)	Interim appointee lost election. Successor elected November 5, 2002 to the remainder of the term ending January 3, 2007.	Jim Talent (R)	November 23, 2002
Texas (2)	Phil Gramm (R)	Incumbent resigned November 30, 2002, to give successor seniority advantages. Successor appointed on December 2, 2002, having already been elected to the next term.	John Cornyn (R)	December 2, 2002
Alaska (3)	Frank Murkowski (R)	Incumbent resigned December 2, 2002, to become Governor of Alaska. Successor appointed to remainder of the term ending January 3, 2005.	Lisa Murkowski (R)	December 20, 2002

=== House of Representatives ===
House changes
District	Vacated by	Reason for change	Successor	Date of successor's formal installation
California 32nd	Vacant	Incumbent Julian Dixon (D) had died December 8, 2000, before the beginning of this Congress. A special election was held June 5, 2001.	Diane Watson (D)	June 5, 2001
Pennsylvania 9th	Bud Shuster (R)	Incumbent resigned, effective January 31, 2001. A special election was held May 15, 2001.	Bill Shuster (R)	May 15, 2001
Virginia 4th	Norman Sisisky (D)	Incumbent died March 30, 2001. A special election was held June 19, 2001.	Randy Forbes (R)	June 19, 2001
Massachusetts 9th	Joe Moakley (D)	Incumbent died May 28, 2001. A special election was held October 16, 2001.	Stephen Lynch (D)	October 16, 2001
Arkansas 3rd	Asa Hutchinson (R)	Incumbent resigned August 5, 2001, to head the Drug Enforcement Administration. A special election was held November 20, 2001.	John Boozman (R)	November 20, 2001
South Carolina 2nd	Floyd Spence (R)	Incumbent died August 16, 2001. A special election was held December 18, 2001.	Joe Wilson (R)	December 18, 2001
Florida 1st	Joe Scarborough (R)	Incumbent resigned, effective September 6, 2001. A special election was held October 16, 2001.	Jeff Miller (R)	October 16, 2001
Oklahoma 1st	Steve Largent (R)	Incumbent resigned, effective February 15, 2002, to concentrate on his campaign for governor. A special election was held January 8, 2002.	John Sullivan (R)	February 15, 2002
Ohio 17th	Jim Traficant (D)	Incumbent expelled July 24, 2002, for criminal conviction of 10 counts of bribery, racketeering, and tax evasion.	Vacant	Not filled for remainder of Congress
Virginia 5th	Virgil Goode (I)	Incumbent changed party.	Virgil Goode (R)	August 1, 2002
Ohio 3rd	Tony P. Hall (D)	Incumbent resigned September 9, 2002, after he was appointed to be the U.S. Ambassador to the United Nations Food and Agriculture Organization.	Vacant	Not filled for remainder of Congress
Hawaii 2nd	Patsy Mink (D)	Incumbent died September 28, 2002, but was elected posthumously on November 5, 2002.	Ed Case (D)	November 30, 2002

== Committees ==
Lists of committees and their party leaders for members of the House and Senate committees can be found through the Official Congressional Directory at the bottom of this article. The directory after the pages of terms of service lists committees of the Senate, House (Standing with Subcommittees, Select and Special) and Joint and, after that, House/Senate committee assignments. On the committees section of the House and Senate in the Official Congressional Directory, the committee's members on the first row on the left side shows the chairman of the committee and on the right side shows the ranking member of the committee.

=== Senate ===
- Aging (Special) (Chair: John Breaux, then Larry Craig, then John Breaux, Ranking Member: Larry Craig, then John Breaux, then Larry Craig)
- Agriculture, Nutrition and Forestry (Chair: Tom Harkin, then Richard Lugar, then Tom Harkin, Ranking Member: Richard Lugar, then Tom Harkin, then Richard Lugar)
  - Forestry, Conservation and Rural Revitalization (Chair: Blanche Lincoln)
  - Marketing Inspection and Product Promotion (Chair: Max Baucus)
  - Production and Price Competitiveness (Chair: Kent Conrad)
  - Research, Nutrition and General Legislation (Chair: Patrick Leahy)
- Appropriations (Chair: Robert Byrd, then Ted Stevens, then Robert Byrd, Ranking Member: Ted Stevens, then Robert Byrd, then Ted Stevens)
  - Agriculture, Rural Development and Related Agencies (Chair: Herb Kohl)
  - Commerce, Justice, State and the Judiciary (Chair: Ernest F. Hollings)
  - Defense (Chair: Daniel K. Inouye)
  - District of Columbia (Chair: Mary Landrieu)
  - Energy and Water Development (Chair: Harry Reid)
  - Foreign Operations (Chair: Patrick Leahy)
  - Interior (Chair: Robert Byrd)
  - Labor, Health, Human Services and Education (Chair: Tom Harkin)
  - Legislative Branch (Chair: Richard Durbin)
  - Military Construction (Chair: Dianne Feinstein)
  - Transportation (Chair: Patty Murray)
  - Treasury and General Government (Chair: Byron Dorgan)
  - VA, HUD and Independent Agencies (Chair: Barbara Mikulski)
- Armed Services (Chair: Carl Levin, then John Warner, then Carl Levin, Ranking Member: John Warner, then Carl Levin, then John Warner)
  - Airland (Chair: Joe Lieberman)
  - Emerging Threats and Capabilities (Chair: Mary Landrieu)
  - Personnel (Chair: Max Cleland)
  - Readiness and Management Support (Chair: Daniel Akaka)
  - Seapower (Chair: Ted Kennedy)
  - Strategic (Chair: Jack Reed)
- Banking, Housing and Urban Affairs (Chair: Paul Sarbanes, then Phil Gramm, then Paul Sarbanes, Ranking Member: Phil Gramm, then Paul Sarbanes, then Phil Gramm)
  - Economic Policy (Chair: Chuck Schumer)
  - Financial Institutions (Chair: Tim Johnson)
  - Housing and Transportation (Chair: Jack Reed)
  - International Trade and Finance (Chair: Evan Bayh)
  - Securities (Chair: Chris Dodd)
- Budget (Chair: Kent Conrad, then Pete Domenici, then Kent Conrad, Ranking Member: Pete Domenici, then Kent Conrad, then Pete Domenici)
- Commerce, Science and Transportation (Chair: Ernest Hollings, then John McCain, then Ernest Hollings, Ranking Member: John McCain, then Ernest Hollings, then John McCain)
  - Aviation (Chair: Jay Rockefeller)
  - Communications (Chair: Daniel Inouye)
  - Consumer Affairs, Foreign Commerce and Tourism (Chair: Byron Dorgan)
  - Oceans, Atmosphere and Fisheries (Chair: John Kerry)
  - Science, Technology and Space (Chair: Ron Wyden)
  - Surface Transportation and Merchant Marine (Chair: John Breaux)
- Energy and Natural Resources (Chair: Jeff Bingaman, then Frank Murkowski, then Jeff Bingaman, Ranking Member: Frank Murkowski, then Jeff Bingaman, then Frank Murkowski)
  - Energy Research, Development, Production and Regulation (Chair: Bob Graham)
  - Forests and Public Land Management (Chair: Ron Wyden)
  - National Parks, Historic Preservation and Recreation (Chair: Daniel Akaka)
  - Water and Power (Chair: Byron L. Dorgan)
- Environment and Public Works (Chair: Harry Reid, then Bob Smith, then Jim Jeffords, Ranking Member: Bob Smith, then Harry Reid, then Bob Smith)
  - Clean Air, Wetlands and Climate Change (Chair: Joe Lieberman)
  - Fisheries, Wildlife, and Water (Chair: Bob Graham)
  - Superfund, Toxics, Risk and Waste Management (Chair: Barbara Boxer)
  - Transportation, Infrastructure and Nuclear Safety (Chair: Harry Reid)
- Ethics (Select) (Chair: Pat Roberts, then Harry Reid, Ranking Member: Harry Reid, then Pat Roberts)
- Finance (Chair: Max Baucus, then Chuck Grassley, then Max Baucus, Ranking Member: Chuck Grassley, then Max Baucus, then Chuck Grassley)
  - Health Care (Chair: Jay Rockefeller)
  - International Trade (Chair: Max Baucus)
  - Long-Term Growth and Debt Reduction (Chair: Bob Graham)
  - Social Security and Family Policy (Chair: John Breaux)
  - Taxation and IRS Oversight (Chair: Kent Conrad)
- Foreign Relations (Chair: Joe Biden, then Jesse Helms, then Joe Biden, Ranking Member: Jesse Helms, then Joe Biden, then Jesse Helms)
  - African Affairs (Chair: Russ Feingold)
  - Central Asia and the South Caucasus (Chair: Robert Torricelli)
  - East Asian and Pacific Affairs (Chair: John Kerry)
  - European Affairs (Chair: Joe Biden)
  - International Economic Policy, Export and Trade Promotion (Chair: Paul Sarbanes)
  - International Operations and Terrorism (Chair: Barbara Boxer)
  - Near Eastern and South Asian Affairs (Chair: Paul Wellstone)
  - Western Hemisphere, Peace Corps, Narcotics and Terrorism (Chair: Chris Dodd)
- Governmental Affairs (Chair: Joe Lieberman, then Fred Thompson, then Joe Lieberman, Ranking Member: Fred Thompson, then Joe Lieberman, then Fred Thompson)
  - International Security, Proliferation and Federal Services (Chair: Daniel Akaka)
  - Oversight of Government Management, Restructuring and the District of Columbia (Chair: Richard Durbin)
  - Permanent Subcommittee on Investigations (Chair: Carl Levin)
- Indian Affairs (Select) (Chair: Daniel Inouye, then Ben Nighthorse Campbell, then Daniel Inouye, Ranking Member: Ben Nighthorse Campbell, then Daniel Inouye, then Ben Nighthorse Campbell)
- Intelligence (Select) (Chair: Bob Graham, then Richard Shelby, then Bob Graham, Ranking Member: Richard Shelby, then Bob Graham, then Richard Shelby)
- Health, Education, Labor and Pensions (Chair: Ted Kennedy, then Jim Jeffords, then Ted Kennedy, Ranking Member: Jim Jeffords, then Ted Kennedy, then Judd Gregg)
  - Children and Families (Chair: Chris Dodd)
  - Public Health (Chair: Ted Kennedy)
  - Aging (Chair: Barbara Mikulski)
  - Employment, Safety and Training (Chair: Paul Wellstone)
- Judiciary (Chair: Patrick Leahy, then Orrin Hatch, then Patrick Leahy, Ranking Member: Orrin Hatch, then Patrick Leahy, then Orrin Hatch)
  - Administrative Oversight and the Courts (Chair: Chuck Schumer)
  - Antitrust, Business Rights and Competition (Chair: Herb Kohl)
  - Constitution, Federalism and Property Rights (Chair: Russ Feingold)
  - Crime and Drugs (Chair: Joe Biden)
  - Immigration (Chair: Ted Kennedy)
  - Technology, Terrorism and Government Information (Chair: Dianne Feinstein)
- Rules and Administration (Chair: Chris Dodd, then Mitch McConnell, then Chris Dodd, Ranking Member: Mitch McConnell, then Chris Dodd, then Mitch McConnell)
- Small Business (Chair: John Kerry, then Kit Bond, then John Kerry, Ranking Member: Kit Bond, then John Kerry, then Kit Bond)
- Veterans' Affairs (Chair: Jay Rockefeller, then Arlen Specter, then Jay Rockefeller, Ranking Member: Arlen Specter, then Jay Rockefeller, then Arlen Specter)

=== House of Representatives ===
- Agriculture (Chair: Larry Combest, Vice Chair: John A. Boehner, Ranking Member: Charles Stenholm)
  - Department Operations, Oversight, Nutrition and Forestry (Chair: Bob Goodlatte)
  - Conservation, Credit, Rural Development and Research (Chair: Frank Lucas)
  - Department Operations, Oversight, Nutrition and Forestry (Chair: Bob Goodlatte)
  - General Farm Commodities and Risk Management (Chair: Saxby Chambliss)
  - Livestock and Horticulture (Chair: Richard Pombo)
  - Specialty Crops and Foreign Agriculture Programs (Chair: Richard Pombo)
- Appropriations (Chair: Bill Young, Ranking Member: Dave Obey)
  - Agriculture, Rural Development, Food and Drug Administration and Related Agencies (Chair: Henry Bonilla)
  - Commerce, Justice, State and Judiciary (Chair: Frank Wolf)
  - Defense (Chair: Jerry Lewis)
  - District of Columbia (Chair: Joe Knollenberg)
  - Energy and Water Development (Chair: Sonny Callahan)
  - Foreign Operations, Export Financing and Related Programs (Chair: Jim Kolbe)
  - Interior (Chair: Joe Skeen)
  - Labor, Health, Human Services and Education (Chair: Ralph Regula)
  - Legislative (Chair: Charles Taylor)
  - Military Construction (Chair: David L. Hobson)
  - Transportation (Chair: Hal Rogers)
  - Treasury, Postal Service and General Government (Chair: Ernest J. Istook)
  - VA-HUD Independent Agencies (Chair: James T. Walsh)
- Armed Services (Chair: Bob Stump, Vice Chair: Floyd Spence, Ranking Member: Ike Skelton)
  - Military Installations and Facilities (Chair: Jim Saxton)
  - Military Personnel (Chair: John M. McHugh, Vice Chair: Robin Hayes)
  - Military Procurement (Chair: Floyd Spence then Curt Weldon, Vice Chair: Lindsey Graham)
  - Military Readiness (Chair: Joel Hefley, Vice Chair: Bob Riley)
  - Military Research and Development (Chair: Duncan D. Hunter, Vice Chair: Walter B. Jones Jr.)
  - Special Oversight Panel on Morale, Welfare and Recreation (Chair: Roscoe G. Bartlett)
  - Special Oversight Panel on the Merchant Marine (Chair: Duncan L. Hunter)
  - Department of Energy Reorganization (Chair: Mac Thornberry, Vice Chair: Ken Calvert)
  - Special Oversight Panel on Terrorism (Chair: Jim Saxton, Vice Chair: John N. Hostettler)
- Budget (Chair: Jim Nussle, Ranking Member: John Spratt)
- Education and the Workforce (Chair: John Boehner, Vice Chair: Tom Petri, Ranking Member: George Miller)
  - Employer-Employee Relations (Chair: Sam Johnson, Vice Chair: Ernie Fletcher)
  - Workforce Protections (Chair: Charlie Norwood, Vice Chair: Judy Biggert)
  - 21st Century Competitiveness (Chair: Buck McKeon, Vice Chair: Johnny Isakson)
  - Education Reform (Chair: Michael N. Castle, Vice Chair: Bob Schaffer)
  - Select Education (Chair: Peter Hoekstra, Vice Chair: Pat Tiberi)
- Energy and Commerce (Chair: Billy Tauzin, Vice Chair: Richard Burr, Ranking Member: John Dingell)
  - Commerce, Trade and Consumer Production (Chair: Cliff Stearns, Vice Chair: Nathan Deal)
  - Energy and Air Quality (Chair: Joe Barton, Vice Chair: Steve Largent)
  - Environment and Hazardous Materials (Chair: Paul E. Gillmor, Vice Chair: John Shimkus)
  - Health (Chair: Michael Bilirakis, Vice Chair: Charlie Norwood)
  - Oversight and Investigations (Chair: James C. Greenwood, Vice Chair: Ed Whitfield)
  - Telecommunications and the Internet (Chair: Fred Upton, Vice Chair: Cliff Stearns)
- Financial Services (Chair: Mike Oxley, Vice Chair: Marge Roukema, Ranking Member: John LaFalce)
  - Capital Markets, Insurance and Government-Sponsored Enterprises (Chair: Richard H. Baker, Vice Chair: Robert W. Ney)
  - Domestic Monetary Policy, Technology and Economic Growth (Chair: Peter T. King, Vice Chair: Jim Leach)
  - Financial Institutions and Consumer Credit (Chair: Spencer Bachus, Vice Chair: Dave Weldon)
  - Housing and Community Opportunity (Chair: Marge Roukema, Vice Chair: Mark Green)
  - International Monetary Policy and Trade (Chair: Doug Bereuter, Vice Chair: Doug Ose)
  - Oversight and Investigations (Chair: Sue W. Kelly, Vice Chair: Ron Paul)
- Government Reform (Chair: Dan Burton, Ranking Member: Henry Waxman)
  - Census (Chair: Dan Miller, Vice Chair: Chris Cannon)
  - Civil Service and Agency Organization (Chair: Dave Weldon)
  - Criminal Justice, Drug Policy and Human Resources (Chair: Mark Souder, Vice Chair: Benjamin A. Gilman)
  - District of Columbia (Chair: Constance Morella, Vice Chair: Todd R. Platts)
  - Energy Policy, Natural Resources and Regulatory Affairs (Chair: Doug Ose, Vice Chair: Butch Otter)
  - Government Efficiency, Financial Management and Intergovernmental Relations (Chair: Stephen Horn, Vice Chair: Ron Lewis)
  - National Security, Veterans' Affairs and International Relations (Chair: Christopher Shays, Vice Chair: Adam Putnam)
  - Technology and Procurement Policy (Chair: Thomas M. Davis, Vice Chair: Jo Ann Davis)
- House Administration (Chair: Bob Ney, Ranking Member: Steny Hoyer)
- International Relations (Chair: Henry Hyde, Ranking Member: Tom Lantos)
  - Africa (Chair: Edward Royce)
  - East Asia and the Pacific (Chair: Jim Leach)
  - Europe (Chair: Elton Gallegly)
  - International Operations and Human Rights (Chair: Ileana Ros-Lehtinen)
  - The Middle East and South Asia (Chair: Benjamin Gilman)
  - Western Hemisphere (Chair: Cass Ballenger)
- Judiciary (Chair: Jim Sensenbrenner, Ranking Member: John Conyers)
  - Commercial and Administrative Law (Chair: Bob Barr, Vice Chair: Jeff Flake)
  - The Constitution (Chair: Steve Chabot, Vice Chair: Melissa Hart)
  - Courts, the Internet and Intellectual Property (Chair: Howard Coble, Vice Chair: Bob Goodlatte)
  - Crime (Chair: Lamar Smith)
  - Immigration and Claims (Chair: George Gekas, Vice Chair: Chris Cannon)
- Resources (Chair: James V. Hansen, Vice Chair: Don Young, Ranking Member: Nick Rahall)
  - Energy and Mineral Resources (Chair: Barbara Cubin, Vice Chair: Jim Gibbons)
  - Fisheries Conservation, Wildlife and Oceans (Chair: Wayne T. Gilchrest, Vice Chair: Jim Saxton)
  - National Parks, Recreation and Public Lands (Chair: George P. Radanovich, Vice Chair: John E. Peterson)
  - Forests and Forest Health (Chair: Scott McInnis, Vice Chair: Walter B. Jones Jr.)
  - Water and Power (Chair: Ken Calvert, Vice Chair: George P. Radanovich)
- Rules (Chair: David Dreier, Vice Chair: Porter Goss, Ranking Member: Joe Moakley, then Martin Frost)
  - The Legislative Process (Chair: Deborah Pryce, Vice Chair: Porter Goss)
  - Technology and the House (Chair: John Linder, Vice Chair: Lincoln Diaz-Balart)
- Science (Chair: Sherwood Boehlert, Vice Chair: Gil Gutknecht, Ranking Member: Ralph Hall)
  - Energy (Chair: Roscoe G. Bartlett, Vice Chair: Melissa A. Hart)
  - Environment, Technology and Standards (Chair: Vernon J. Ehlers, Vice Chair: Felix Grucci)
  - Research (Chair: Nick Smith, Vice Chair: Tim Johnson)
  - Space and Aeronautics (Chair: Dana Rohrabacher, Vice Chair: Dave Weldon)
- Small Business (Chair: Don Manzullo, Ranking Member: Nydia M. Velázquez)
  - Regulatory Reform and Oversight (Chair: Mike Pence)
  - Rural Enterprises, Agriculture and Technology (Chair: John R. Thune)
  - Tax, Finance and Exports (Chair: Patrick J. Toomey)
  - Workforce, Empowerment and Government Programs (Chair: Jim DeMint)
- Standards of Official Conduct (Chair: Joel Hefley, Ranking Member: Howard L. Berman)
- Transportation and Infrastructure (Chair: Don Young, Vice Chair: Tom Petri, Ranking Member: Jim Oberstar)
  - Aviation (Chair: John Mica, Vice Chair: John Cooksey)
  - Coast Guard and Maritime Transportation (Chair: Frank LoBiondo, Vice Chair: Rob Simmons)
  - Economic Development, Public Buildings and Emergency Management (Chair: Steven LaTourette, Vice Chair: Shelley Moore Capito)
  - Highways and Transit (Chair: Tom Petri, Vice Chair: Mark R. Kennedy)
  - Railroads (Chair: Jack Quinn, Vice Chair: Mike Ferguson)
  - Water Resources and Environment (Chair: John J. Duncan, Vice Chair: Denny Rehberg)
- Veterans' Affairs (Chair: Chris Smith, Vice Chair: Michael Bilirakis, Ranking Member: Lane Evans)
  - Benefits (Chair: Mike Simpson, Vice Chair: Floyd Spence)
  - Health (Chair: Jerry Moran, Vice Chair: Cliff Stearns)
  - Oversight and Investigations (Chair: Steve Buyer, Vice Chair: Bob Stump)
- Ways and Means (Chair: Bill Thomas, Ranking Member: Charles Rangel)
  - Health (Chair: Nancy Johnson)
  - Human Resources (Chair: Wally Herger)
  - Oversight (Chair: Amo Houghton)
  - Select Revenue Measures (Chair: Jim McCrery)
  - Social Security (Chair: Clay Shaw)
  - Trade (Chair: Phil Crane)
- Whole

=== Joint committees ===
- Economic (Chair: Rep. Jim Saxton, Vice Chair: Sen. Jack Reed)
- Taxation (Chair: Rep. Bill Thomas, Vice Chair: Sen. Max Baucus)
- The Library (Chair: Rep. Vernon J. Ehlers, Vice Chair: Sen. Chris Dodd)
- Printing (Chair: Sen. Mark Dayton, Vice Chair: Rep. Robert W. Ney)

== Employees ==
=== Legislative branch agency directors ===
- Architect of the Capitol: Alan M. Hantman
- Attending Physician of the United States Congress: John F. Eisold
- Comptroller General of the United States: David M. Walker
- Director of the Congressional Budget Office: Dan Crippen
- Librarian of Congress: James H. Billington
- Public Printer of the United States: Michael F. DiMario, until 2002
  - Bruce James, from 2002

=== Senate ===
- Chaplain: Lloyd John Ogilvie (Presbyterian)
- Curator: Diane K. Skvarla
- Historian: Richard A. Baker
- Parliamentarian: Bob Dove, until May 2001
  - Alan Frumin, May 2001 - end
- Secretary: Gary Lee Sisco, until July 11, 2001
  - Jeri Thomson, July 12, 2001 - end
- Librarian: Greg Harness
- Sergeant at Arms: James W. Ziglar, until August 2, 2001
  - Alfonso E. Lenhardt, September 4, 2001 - end
- Secretary for the Majority / Minority:
  - Martin P. Paone (Democrats)
  - Elizabeth B. Letchworth (Republicans)
  - David J. Schiappa (Republicans)

=== House of Representatives ===
- Chaplain: Daniel P. Coughlin (Roman Catholic)
- Chief Administrative Officer: James M. Eagen III
- Clerk: Jeff Trandahl
- Parliamentarian: Charles W. Johnson
- Reading Clerks: Mary Kevin Niland (D) and Paul Hays (R)
- Sergeant at Arms: Wilson Livingood
- Inspector General: Steven McNamara

== See also ==
- List of new members of the 107th Congress
- 2000 United States elections (elections leading to this Congress)
  - 2000 United States presidential election
  - 2000 United States Senate elections
  - 2000 United States House of Representatives elections
- 2002 United States elections (elections during this Congress, leading to the next Congress)
  - 2002 United States Senate elections
  - 2002 United States House of Representatives elections
