= Nardulli =

Nardulli is a surname. Notable people with the surname include:

- Ann Nardulli (1948–2018), American endocrinologist
- Giuseppe Nardulli (1947–2008), Italian physicist
- Guy Nardulli (born 1974), American actor and producer
- Itaco Nardulli, Italian actor
- Michael Nardulli (1920–2007), American politician
