= Emily J. Reynolds =

American government official (born c. 1956)

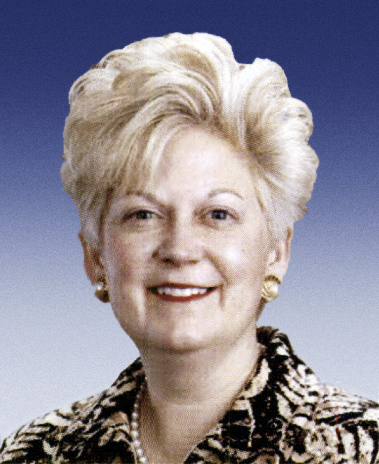

31st Secretary of the United States Senate
- In office January 7, 2003 – January 3, 2007
- Leader: Bill Frist
- Preceded by: Jeri Thomson
- Succeeded by: Nancy Erickson

Personal details
- Born: c.1965 (age 60–61) Nashville, Tennessee
- Education: Stephens College (BA)

Emily J. Reynolds (born c. 1956) is an American political aide who served as the Secretary of the United States Senate from January 7, 2003 to January 3, 2007. She was appointed Secretary of the Senate when the United States Senate convened on January 7, 2003, for the 108th Congress. Prior to her appointment as Secretary, Reynolds was the chief of staff for Senator Bill Frist. She is the thirty-first person, and the fifth woman, to serve as Secretary of the Senate.

== Early life and education ==
A native of Nashville, Reynolds received a Bachelor of Arts in political science and broadcasting from Stephens College in Columbia, Missouri.

== Career ==
Immediately following her graduation in 1978, she was named as the college's associate director of admissions. She has remained active with her alma mater and served on the board of curators and as chair of the alumnae development board.

Reynolds began her career in politics in 1980 as a special assistant to Senator Howard Baker. In 1985 she worked on the successful Senate campaign of then-Governor Kit Bond of Missouri. Subsequently Reynolds worked in seven statewide campaigns in six states, including the Senate campaigns of John Danforth, John Heinz, and Kay Bailey Hutchison. She joined the Bush–Quayle re-election campaign in 1992 as deputy director of national coalitions.

Reynolds returned to her home state of Tennessee in November 1993 to serve as deputy campaign manager and finance director for Frist's Senate campaign. During Senator Frist's first term in the Senate, Reynolds became his state director. She then managed his successful reelection campaign in 2000. As chief of staff for Senator Frist from January 2001, Reynolds supervised his Washington, D.C. and Tennessee offices.

Reynolds joined TVA in April 2007 as Senior Vice President of Communications, Government & Valley Relations. Her office is located in Nashville and reported directly to TVA's CEO, Tom Kilgore from 2007 to 2013.

Government offices
Preceded by Jeri Thomson	31st Secretary of the United States Senate; 2003 – 2007	Succeeded by Nancy Erickson
