= Billy Ocasio =

American politician

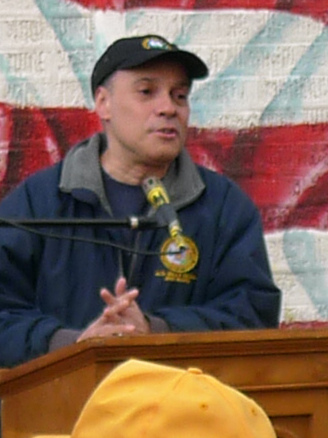

City of Chicago Alderman from the 26th Ward
- In office January 12, 1993 – May 13, 2009
- Preceded by: Luis Gutiérrez
- Succeeded by: Roberto Maldonado

Personal details
- Party: Democratic
- Education: University of Illinois

Billy Ocasio is a politician who formerly served as a Chicago alderman. He left the Chicago City Council in 2009 to serve as an advisor to Illinois Governor Pat Quinn, appointed to work on social justice issues. He began this position on June 1, 2009 after it had been announced on May 12, 2009.

== Early life ==
Ocasio is a lifelong resident of Humboldt Park where he attended Von Humboldt Elementary School and Roberto Clemente Community Academy.

== Aldermanic career ==
Ocasio was appointed alderman in 1993 by Mayor Richard M. Daley to fill the unexpired term of Luis Gutierrez, who was elected congressman. Ocasio officially took office on January 12, 1993. Throughout his career as alderman, Ocasio fought for the allocation of resources for the community to thrive in the 26th Ward. This included construction of the two monuments to the Puerto Rican flags that launched the creation of a Puerto Rican restaurant and entertainment district, the first of its kind in the country. It also included the first new school in the ward, with the building of the new Ames School; the development of the McCormick Tribune YMCA; and worked for the allocation of the first library branch in Humboldt Park, and was able to construct the Humboldt Park Public Library. Ocasio also led a $16 million rehab for Humboldt Park which included renovating and modernizing the boat house, the lagoon, and inland beach. Amongst these accomplishments he also championed the creation of more affordable housing and first time home ownership that in any other ward in the city. Leading the creation of what would eventually become the citywide Chicago Community Land Trust. He worked with the city to create citywide policy like the 10% set aside for all new construction ensuring that housing options were diverse and available to all income households. Ocasio was Chairman of the Human Relations Committee. Additionally, he served on five other committees: Budget and Government Operations; Education; Energy, Environmental Protection, and Public Utilities; Finance; and Housing and Real Estate. Ocasio resigned from the Chicago City Council effective May 13, 2009. Daley appointed Cook County Commissioner and 26th Ward Committeeman Roberto Maldonado to succeed him.

== Personal life ==
Alderman Ocasio and his family (Veronica Ocasio, Ismael Sanchez, Gabriel Ocasio, Antonio Ocasio, and Milo Sanchez (dog).) The family attended church at New Life Covenant Ministries in Chicago. He attended the University of Illinois at Urbana-Champaign and while there he served as President of the "Arrogant" Alpha Lambda chapter of Iota Phi Theta fraternity. He returned to Chicago a few months before graduation due to the death of a friend and eventually graduated from Northeastern IL University.
