= Nancy Erickson =

American political aide

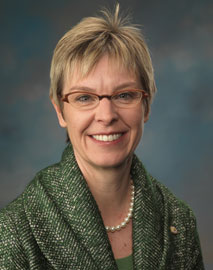

32nd Secretary of the United States Senate
- In office January 4, 2007 – January 5, 2015
- Leader: Harry Reid
- Preceded by: Emily J. Reynolds
- Succeeded by: Julie E. Adams

Personal details
- Born: Brandon, South Dakota
- Education: Augustana University (BA); American University (MA)

Nancy Erickson is an American political aide who served as the 32nd Secretary of the United States Senate from 2007 to 2015. She began her term as Secretary on January 4, 2007, in the 110th Congress. Erickson was appointed by Democratic and Majority Leader Harry Reid of Nevada.

== Early life and education ==
A native of Brandon, South Dakota, Erickson earned a Bachelor of Arts from Augustana University and a Master of Arts from American University.

== Career ==
Prior to serving as Secretary of the Senate, Erickson served as the Democratic Representative to the Sergeant at Arms. She also served as the deputy chief of staff to former Senate majority leader Tom Daschle.

On January 6, 2009, Erickson rejected Roland Burris's request to be seated as the junior U.S. senator from Illinois. She stated that his credentials were incomplete because they were not signed by the Illinois Secretary of State, Jesse White. White refused to sign because the appointment was made by Illinois Governor Rod Blagojevich, who was charged in a corruption scandal with seeking to personally gain from the appointment.

== Personal life ==
Erickson is married to Thomas J. Erickson, an attorney who served as a Commissioner of the Commodity Futures Trading Commission from 1999 to 2004.

Government offices
Preceded by Emily J. Reynolds	32nd Secretary of the United States Senate; 2007 – 2015	Succeeded by Julie E. Adams
