= Luis Gutiérrez =

American politician (born 1953)

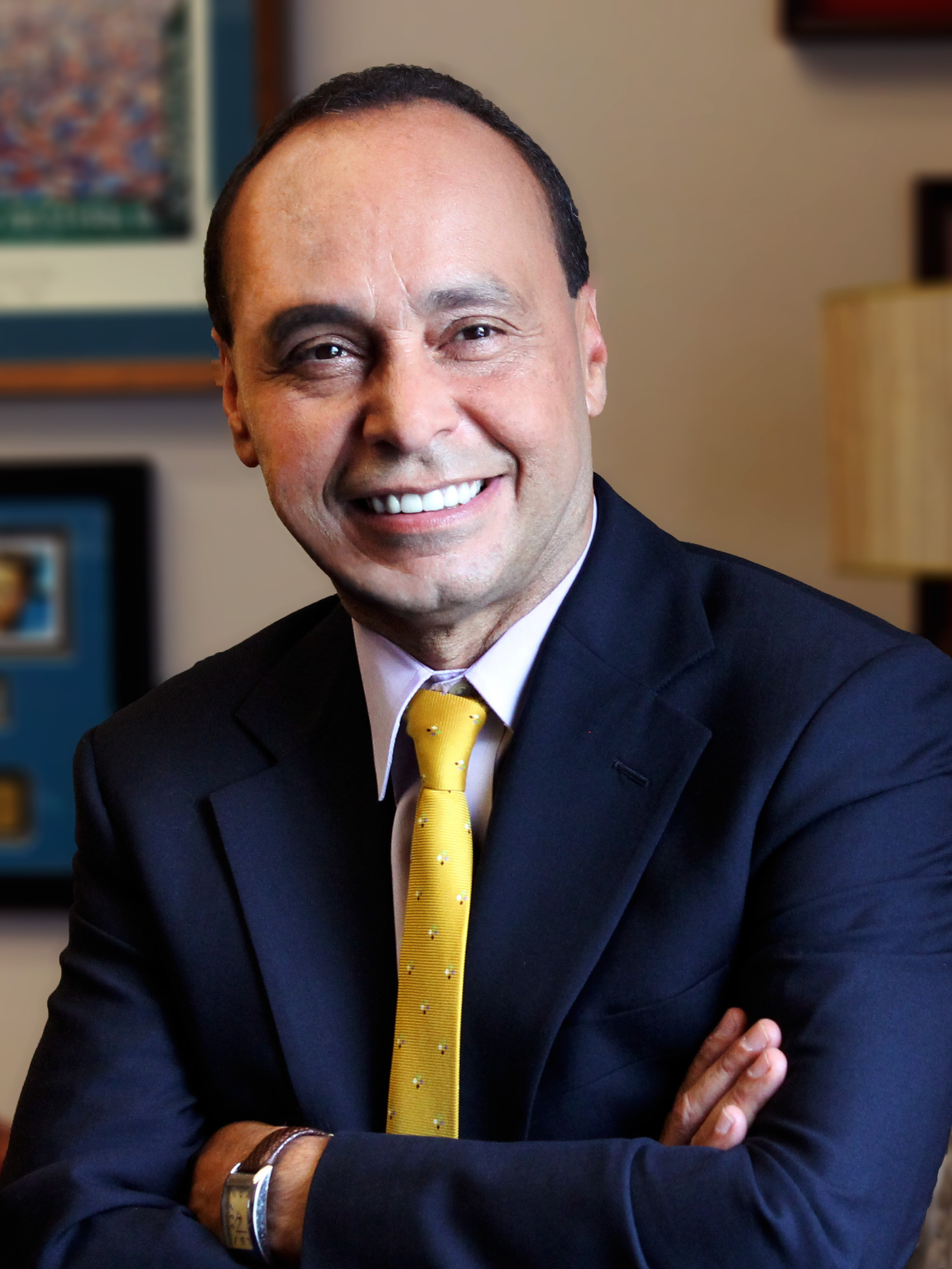

Member of the U.S. House of Representatives from Illinois's 4th district
- In office January 3, 1993 – January 3, 2019
- Preceded by: George Sangmeister
- Succeeded by: Chuy García

Member of the Chicago City Council from 26th ward
- In office May 2, 1986 – December 12, 1992
- Preceded by: Michael Nardulli
- Succeeded by: Billy Ocasio

Personal details
- Born: Luis Moses Gutiérrez; December 10, 1953 (age 72) Chicago, Illinois, U.S.
- Party: Democratic
- Spouse: Soraida Arocho (m. 1977)
- Children: 2 daughters
- Education: Northeastern Illinois University (BA)
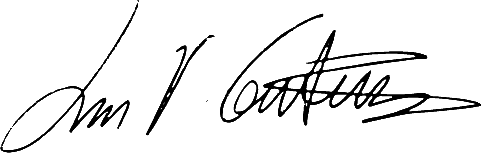
- Signature
- Gutiérrez's voice Gutiérrez supporting initiatives for young DREAMers. Recorded August 1, 2012

Luis Vicente Gutiérrez (born December 10, 1953) is an American politician. He served as the U.S. representative for Illinois's 4th congressional district from 1993 to 2019. From 1986 until his election to Congress, he served as a member of the Chicago City Council representing the 26th ward. He is a member of the Democratic Party and was a member of the Congressional Progressive Caucus during his tenure in the House. In the 113th Congress, with his 20 years of service, Gutiérrez became, along with Bobby Rush, the longest serving member of the Illinois House delegation, and so was occasionally referred to as the unofficial "dean" of the delegation.

Of Puerto Rican descent, he is a current supporter of Puerto Rican independence, and the Vieques movement. Gutiérrez is also an outspoken advocate of workers' rights, LGBT rights, gender equality, and other liberal and progressive causes. In 2010, Frank Sharry of America's Voice, an immigration reform advocacy group, said of Gutiérrez: "He's as close as the Latino community has to a Martin Luther King figure." His supporters have given him the nickname El Gallito – the little fighting rooster – in reference to his fiery oratory and political prowess.

His district, the 4th congressional district, was featured by The Economist as one of the most strangely drawn and gerrymandered congressional districts in the country and has been nicknamed "earmuffs" due to its shape. It was created to pack two majority Hispanic parts of Chicago into one district, thereby creating a majority Hispanic district.

In November 2017, Gutiérrez announced that he would retire from Congress at the end of his current term, and not seek re-election in 2018. As of 2021, Gutiérrez lives in Puerto Rico.

== Early life, education, and early career ==
Gutiérrez was born and raised in the Lincoln Park neighborhood of Chicago, which at the time was an immigrant and working-class community. His mother worked on an assembly line, and his father was a cab driver. After his freshman year at St. Michael's High School, his parents moved the family to their hometown of San Sebastián, Puerto Rico. Gutiérrez, who had not previously visited the island, went with them. There he learned to speak Spanish. Reflecting on the move, he later said: "In Lincoln Park, I had been called a spic, then, all of a sudden, I land on the island and everyone calls me gringo and Americanito. I learned to speak Spanish well."

In 1974, Gutiérrez returned to Chicago and enrolled at Northeastern Illinois University. He became involved in student activism and social justice issues, wrote for the student publication Que Ondee Sola, and served as president of the Union for Puerto Rican Students.

In 1976, while a senior at Northeastern Illinois, he began driving a cab to raise money to visit his longtime girlfriend, Soraida, in Puerto Rico. After graduating in 1977 with a degree in English, he returned to Puerto Rico and married her. The couple moved back to Chicago in 1978. Unable at first to find other employment, Gutiérrez drove a taxi full-time. He later worked as a Chicago Public School teacher and as a child abuse caseworker with the Illinois Department of Children and Family Services.

== Early political career ==
=== Campaign for 32nd ward Democratic committeeman ===
In 1983, Gutiérrez left his job with the Illinois Department of Children and Family Services to run against incumbent Dan Rostenkowski for 32nd ward Democratic committeeman in the March 1984 primary election. To fund his campaign, Gutiérrez returned to driving a cab seven days a week, 14 hours a day. Gutiérrez's work as a taxi driver grew his campaign fund to $6,000, against which Rostenkowski had hundreds of thousands of dollars. Reporting on Gutiérrez's early political career, Jorge Casuso and Ben Joravsky of the Chicago Tribune wrote: "Gutiérrez thought he could win. Washington's 1983 victory – the first local race Gutiérrez had voted in – had left him wildly optimistic. Before that, he didn't think blacks, Hispanics and poor people could win a legitimate voice in local government."

Relying on his family and friends as campaign staff, Gutiérrez opened up his campaign office on North California Ave in Chicago's Humboldt Park neighborhood. Gutiérrez collected over three-fourths of the 2,200 signatures he needed to qualify for the ballot on his own. Rostenkowski, then a twelve-term Congressman and chair of the powerful House Ways & Means Committee soundly defeated Gutiérrez, with 76% of the vote.

=== Adviser to Harold Washington ===
Following Gutiérrez's loss to Dan Rostenkowski, he helped found the Cook County Coalition for New Politics in spring of 1984. The coalition was meant to be a grass-roots, independent, and multiracial counterweight to the Cook County Democratic Party.

Gutiérrez's political activism and role as a rising leader in Chicago's burgeoning Latino community caught the attention of Chicago's first African-American Mayor – Harold Washington – who appointed him in August 1984 to the position of deputy superintendent in the Department of Streets and Sanitation.

Gutiérrez served as a deputy superintendent in the Washington administration and as an administrative assistant to the Mayor – serving on the Mayor's committee on infrastructure.

In October 1984, a Molotov cocktail came crashing through the front living room window of Gutiérrez's home. For a period of three months following the firebombing, his family lived in hotel rooms. The offenders were never identified, but Gutiérrez attributed the attack to "culprits from the right ... opposed to reform and Mayor Washington".

In July 1985, in an effort to support Washington's political reform movement, Gutiérrez founded the West Town-26th Ward Independent Political Organization (IPO). Like the Cook County Coalition for New Politics, the organization aimed to bring together residents of all races in support of progressive reform in Chicago. The Mayor attended the organization's kick-off event, at which 100 names were added to the mailing list and $5,000 was raised.

=== 1986 Aldermanic election ===
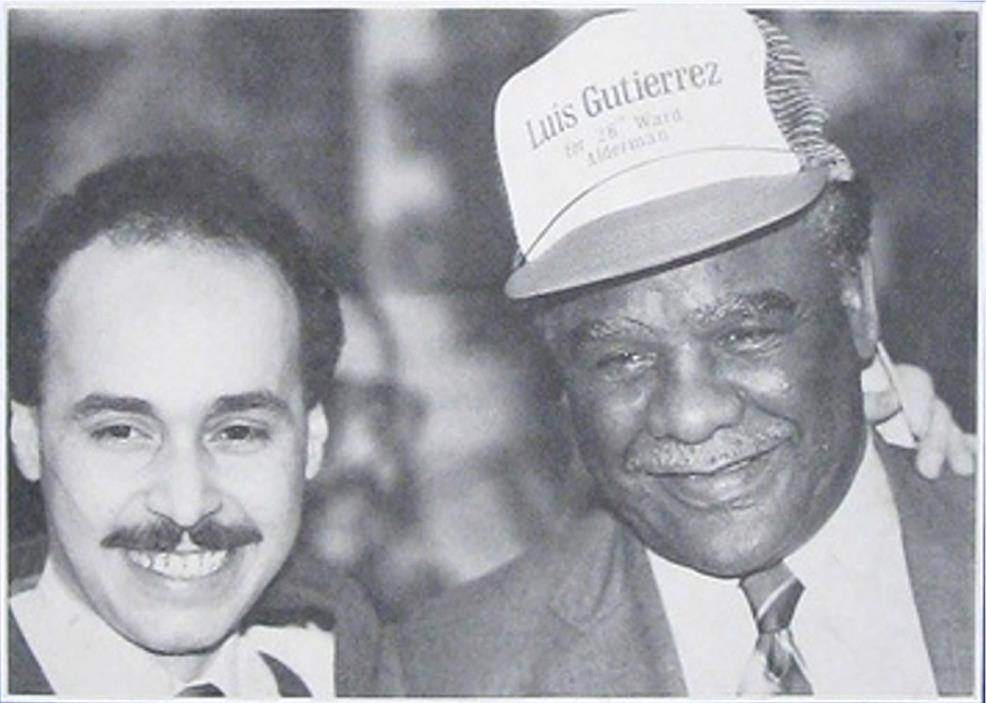
Mayor Harold Washington was a key backer of Gutierrez's 1986 bid for 26th ward alderman.

In December 1985, as a result of a November 1985 ward remap, district court judge Charles Norgle ordered a special election for March 18, 1986, in seven wards, including the 26th. The incumbent alderman of the 26th ward, Michael Nardulli, an Italian-American, chose not to seek re-election in the newly drawn majority Latino district. Gutiérrez declared his candidacy for alderman of the 26th ward and soon received the endorsement of Mayor Harold Washington. At the time of the election, opponents to Washington's administration, led by Ed Vrdolyak of the 10th ward, controlled the City Council. This divide within city government was dubbed by the Chicago media as Council Wars. The 1986 special elections gave Washington the opportunity to take control of the city council. Because the six other special elections were all but decided, control of the council came down to the race in the 26th ward. Manuel Torres, then a member of the Democratic machine and Cook County Commissioner, also entered the race for 26th ward Alderman. Torres was endorsed by Vrdolyak, former mayor Jane Byrne, future mayor and then State's Attorney Richard M. Daley, and machine Alderman Ed Burke and Dick Mell.

Gutiérrez's campaign volunteers were primarily women, "ex-hippies and ... community activists-black, white and Hispanic". With the campaign theme: "Church, Family, Community", support from Mayor Harold Washington – who donated $12,000 to Gutiérrez – and the now 250 members of the West Town-26th Ward Independent Political Organization as volunteers, Gutiérrez bested Torres by 22 votes, a margin not large enough to avoid a run-off against Torres.

On the eve of the Gutiérrez-Torres run-off, Spanish language television aired the candidates' final debate. Gutiérrez, who spoke Spanish during the debate, outperformed Torres, who chose to speak entirely in English. Gutiérrez's use of Spanish and his grass-roots organizing are credited for his 53%–47% victory over Torres. Gutiérrez is reported to have said during the election: "My supporters could give a damn about the Democratic Party. They're ready to work on whatever it is that moves socioeconomic justice ahead."

=== Chicago City Council ===
Upon entering the Chicago City Council, Gutiérrez, representing the 26th Ward, became Mayor Harold Washington's unofficial floor leader, and leader of the Latinos in the council. Gutiérrez said of his role as unofficial Washington spokesman: "There are only six or seven of us of the twenty-five [pro-Washington alderman] that say anything. You could say there's only six or seven that have big mouths and want to talk all the time. But I figured it out-there's only six or seven of us that Eddie Vrdolyak doesn't have anything on, that Eddie Vrdolyak hasn't done a favor for, that Eddie Vrdolyak hasn't taken care of some problem, that Eddie Vrdolyak doesn't have some dirt on. So, when you want to get up and take Eddie on, you got to be clean."

As a member of the city council, Gutiérrez was a key backer of the 1986 gay rights ordinance – which sought to ban discrimination based upon gender & sexual orientation. He was also a proponent of local economic development and construction of affordable housing. He was referred to as a "workhorse in the city council" by political author Marable Manning.

In the 1987 municipal elections, Gutiérrez faced five opponents and was re-elected to the City Council with 66% of the vote. Following Washington's death and the battle over who would succeed the deceased Mayor, Gutiérrez voted for African-American Alderman Timothy C. Evans over machine-backed Alderman Eugene Sawyer. In the 1989 Mayoral election, Gutiérrez endorsed State's Attorney Richard M. Daley for Mayor, stating: "I will have a great influence in determining the thrust and tone of the Daley administration`s progressive and liberal agendas."

Under Daley's administration, Gutiérrez served as Chair of the Committee on Housing, Land Acquisition, Disposition, and Leases and Council President pro tempore, presiding over meetings in the Mayor's absence.

== U.S. House of Representatives ==
=== Elections ===
Election (1992)

In 1990, a court order created a new "earmuff-shaped" majority Latino congressional district, with two main sections in Chicago connected by a thin corridor in the suburbs. Four candidates announced their intention to run in the 1992 Democratic primary: Gutiérrez, Alderman Dick Mell of the 33rd ward, then Cook County Board of Appeals Commissioner Joseph Berrios, and Juan Soliz, former Alderman of 25th ward. Mell, the only white candidate, entered the race out of his "personal dislike for Gutiérrez". Gutiérrez received the endorsement of Mayor Richard M. Daley, and all but one of his opponents, Juan Soliz, dropped out of the race.

Despite the district's majority Mexican-American population and Soliz's highly negative campaign, Gutiérrez won the Democratic primary 60%-40%. At his election night victory party, Gutiérrez stated: "If a Puerto Rican kid from Humboldt Park can go to the Congress of the United States, it shows the American dream is possible." Billy Ocasio was later tapped to replace Gutierrez in the Chicago City Council in January 1993. In the general election, he defeated Republican nominee Hildegarde Rodriguez-Schieman 78%-22%. However, the 4th is a heavily Democratic district, and Gutiérrez had effectively clinched a seat in Congress with his primary win.

Re-elections (1994–2010)

In 1994, Gutierrez defeated Soliz in the primary by an even larger margin 64%-36%, and won re-election to a second term in the general election with 75% of the vote. It would prove to be the lowest winning percentage in a general election in his career. From 1996 to 2008, Gutiérrez won re-election seven times, each time with more than 80% of the vote. In 2010, he won re-election to his tenth term with 77% of the vote.

Gutierrez pulled his petition for re-election in the 2018 race on November 27, 2017, effectively ending his congressional career. The next day Gutierrez held a press conference, he endorsed Cook County Commissioner Jesús "Chuy" García for the position. He did not rule out running for a future office.

=== Tenure ===
==== Party leadership and caucus membership ====
In 2009, Speaker of the United States House of Representatives Nancy Pelosi appointed Gutiérrez Chair of the Democratic Caucus Immigration Task Force. He continued to serve as the Chair of the Congressional Hispanic Caucus Immigration Task Force until he left Congress. In these roles, he served as the Congress's "leading strategist and spokesperson on immigration issues".

==== Constituent services ====
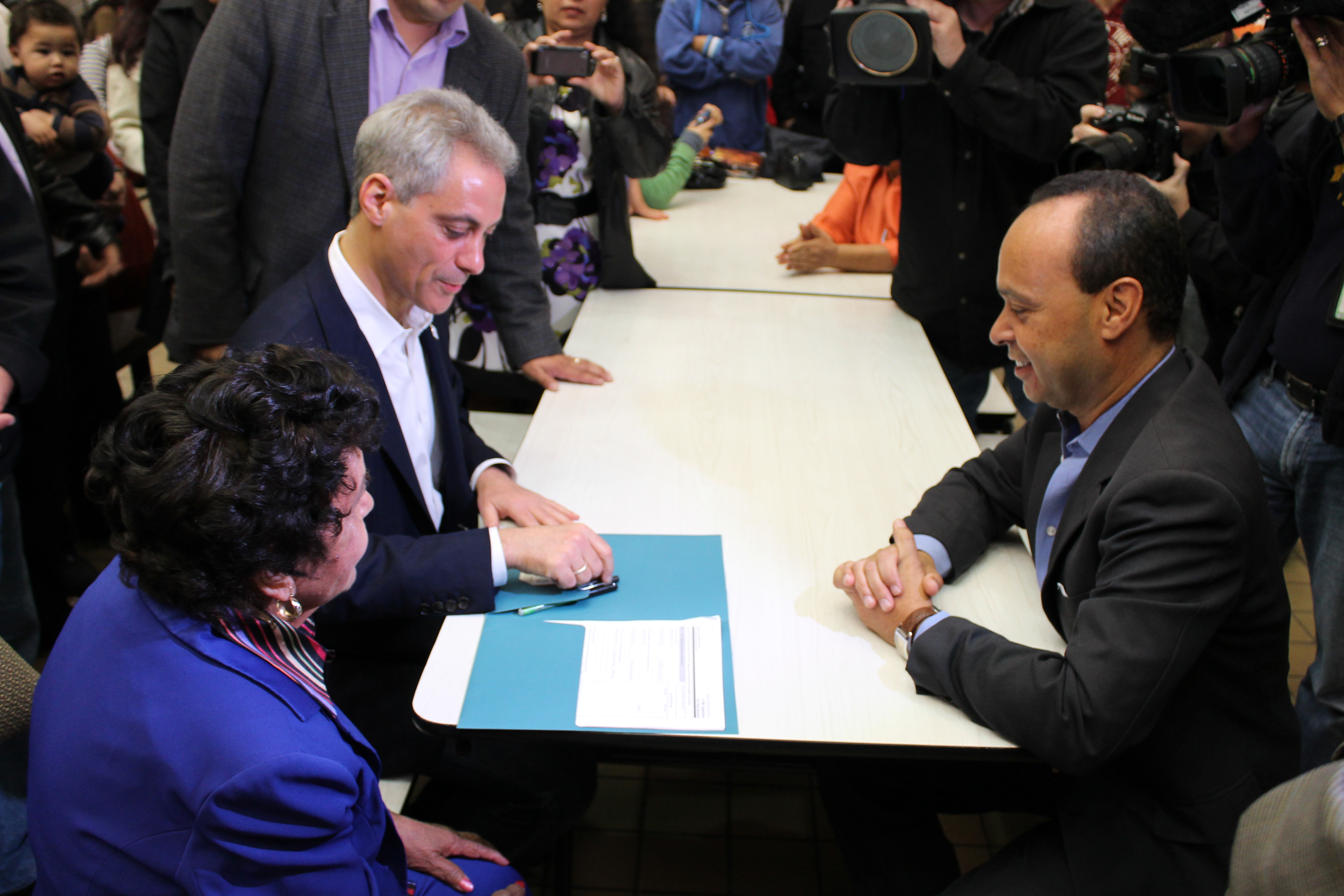
Chicago Mayor Rahm Emanuel assists a constituent apply for US citizenship at Congressman Luis V. Gutierrez's monthly citizenship workshop.

Within his district, he ran workshops which helped more than 50,000 people begin the process of becoming US citizens, as well as programs to support education and English language learning among immigrants. Gutiérrez's district office was the first congressional office to seek and receive community organization designation as a result of the depth and breadth of constituent services it provides.

==== Consumer rights ====
In February 2009, Gutiérrez introduced H.R. 1214, the "Payday Loan Reform Act of 2009", co-sponsored by other members of the House of Representatives, including members of the House leadership. H.R. 1214 would cap the annual percentage rate (APR) for payday loans at 391 percent in the 23 states where it is now allowed to exceed 391 percent.

Gutiérrez also introduced an amendment to the Dodd-Frank bill that created the United States Consumer Financial Protection Bureau changing the formula by which banks were assessed to support the Federal Deposit Insurance Corp.'s bailout fund. The change made assessments based on total assets instead of total deposits, adding $1.4 billion in increased FDIC payments in its first year in force while reducing the cost to smaller community banks.

==== Immigration reform and immigrant rights ====
Gutiérrez has been called the "Moses of the Latinos" due to his many years advocating for immigrant rights.

In his continued efforts to reform immigration, Gutiérrez has participated in two acts of non-violent civil disobedience outside of the White House. The first took place on May 1, 2010, where, following a speech delivered to hundreds at Lafayette Park, Gutiérrez marched with protesters to the White House and refused to leave until Presidential action was taken on immigration reform or he was arrested. Many of the protesters who joined Gutiérrez had signs that called for a Presidential moratorium on deportation and criticized recent anti-immigrant legislation passed in Arizona – SB 1070. Gutiérrez also joined the protesters in criticizing Arizona Governor Jan Brewer's decision to sign the measure allowing racial profiling in the state-level enforcement of immigration laws.

On July 26, 2011, in response to a record-breaking one-million deportations under President Obama, and the President's continued refusal to stop deportations of DREAM Act eligible youth, Gutiérrez and eleven labor, faith, and civil rights leaders were arrested outside the White House. A crowd of 2,500 came to support Gutiérrez and the eleven other leaders. A day before the arrest, President Obama sent a letter to Gutiérrez in which he stated that he would continue his administration's deportation policy.

In 2009, and again in 2011, Gutiérrez went on a nationwide tour in support of comprehensive immigration reform and a moratorium on the deportation of families. The tours received widespread media attention and helped revive the nationwide discussion on immigration reform. Gutiérrez was the main speaker at the historic March 21, 2010, March for America rally at the capitol mall attended by over 200,000 people.

Gutiérrez was the first elected official to sponsor a version of the DREAM Act – legislation to allow undocumented youth brought to the United States as minors a pathway to citizenship – in 2001. In 2009 Gutiérrez introduced CIR-ASAP – Comprehensive Immigration Reform for America's Security and Prosperity Act – a bill to create a pathway to citizenship for non-criminal undocumented immigrants and improve border security. The bill received over 100 co-sponsors and was endorsed by members of the business community and organized labor unions, including the AFL–CIO, United Food and Commercial Workers, and the Service Employees International Union. He described the bill before a Washington DC rally:

My bill will promote fair immigration proceedings, humane treatment of immigration detainees, and policies that respect the tenet of community policing. No more raids in our community, no more separation of our families. Now, none of this works without a strong commitment to America's labor force. None of it works without a strong commitment. So one of the tenets of our bill will be comprehensive immigration reform, has to mean—has to mean—to protecting all workers.

— Luis Gutiérrez,

Following CIR-ASAP's defeat in the Congress, Gutiérrez has been a main backer of the DREAM Act in the House.

Gutiérrez called former Maryland Governor Martin O'Malley a "champion" of immigration in 2014 when the two were working to oppose the White House's deportation policy.

==== Veterans' access to health care ====
While Gutiérrez was a member of the Veterans' Affairs Committee, the House passed legislation introduced by Gutiérrez that made treatment and counseling available to veterans who have been victims of sexual trauma. Gutiérrez also successfully expanded healthcare coverage to those exposed to Agent Orange and high levels of radiation during military service.

Gutiérrez's assistance was pivotal in securing $92 million in additional healthcare and prosthetic funding for veterans.

==== Puerto Rico ====
Gutiérrez has been an advocate for human and civil rights of the Puerto Rican people. In the late 1990s and the 2000s, he was a leader in the Vieques movement, which sought to stop the United States military from using the inhabited island as a bomb testing ground. In May 2000, Gutiérrez was one of nearly two hundred people arrested (including fellow congresswoman Nydia Velázquez) for refusing to leave the natural habitat the US military wished to continue using as a bombing range. Gutierrez was ultimately successful: in May 2003, the Atlantic Fleet Weapons Training Facility on Vieques Island was closed; and in May 2004, the U.S. Navy's last remaining base on Puerto Rico, the Roosevelt Roads Naval Station - which employed 1,000 local contractors and contributed $300 million to the local economy - was closed.

In 2011, Gutiérrez came out against human rights abuses occurring on the island – specifically police brutality perpetrated against University of Puerto Rico students critical of the island's government and a law passed by the Fortuño government that sought to limit student's freedom of speech. Gutiérrez also spoke out against a proposed pipeline which would degrade the island's lush tropical habitat and potentially put residents living near the proposed pipeline in danger.

==== Workers' rights ====
Gutiérrez is a close ally of organized labor and has voted repeatedly to protect and expand workers' rights. In 2008, Gutiérrez was one of the principal elected officials that assisted workers of the Chicago-based Republic Windows and Doors during their successful sit-in. The workers had lost their jobs without advance notice, allegedly due to a refusal of credit from Bank of America after the bailout of the financial system. He met with workers and helped them broker a deal with Bank of America. Gutiérrez views his advocacy for workers' rights and immigrant rights as invariably related. He is frequently invited to speak and present before labor unions.

==== North American Free Trade Agreement ====
In 1994 Gutiérrez was a vocal opponent of NAFTA and ultimately voted against the measure because of the legislation's failure to provide for worker retraining, protect against American job loss, and protect Mexican workers' collective bargaining rights. He criticized the role of Rahm Emanuel in particular for the deficiencies.

==== Public transportation ====
When the Chicago Transit Authority (CTA) declared its plan to close down the Douglas Branch of the then Blue Line – which serves primarily working-class Latino communities – Gutiérrez successfully secured $320 million in federal funding to reconstruct Blue Line stops and pressed the CTA to re-instate full service. The Douglas Branch is now known as the Pink Line.

==== Use of civil disobedience ====
With a background as a community activist and organizer, Gutiérrez often uses non-violent civil disobedience when pushing political causes and legislation. He was arrested in May 2000 in protest of the US military using the inhabited Puerto Rican island of Vieques as a bombing range, and again in May 2010 in protest of presidential inaction on immigration reform. In 2010 and 2011, he was arrested protesting presidential inaction on immigration reform and a record-breaking one-million deportations under President Obama.

==== Criticism ====
Gutiérrez's progressive political stances are often challenged by political commentators. Since 2008, Gutiérrez has been the subject of several critical stories in the Chicago Tribune and Chicago Sun-Times, detailing his relationship with former Illinois Governor Rod Blagojevich, and the real estate dealings of Gutierrez and his family.

=== Committee assignments ===
Upon arriving to the United States House of Representatives, Gutiérrez attempted to organize the 63 incoming Democratic freshmen to support a reform agenda. He sent each one a copy of the book Adventures in Porkland: How Washington Wastes Your Money and Why They Won't Stop. As a result of his attempts to organize the freshmen class, Gutiérrez was passed up by the House leadership for his first choice of the Ways and Means Committee, and his second choice of the Education Committee; instead, he was assigned to the Banking Committee and Veterans' Affairs. In response to being bypassed for his top committee choices as result of his reform advocacy, Gutiérrez charged that then-House Speaker Tom Foley was "not a reformer in any sense".

Congressman Gutiérrez sat on the following House Committees:

- Committee on the Judiciary
  - Subcommittee on Immigration Policy and Border Security,
  - Subcommittee on Crime, Terrorism, Homeland Security and Investigations;

Gutiérrez was a member of the Judiciary Committee during the 110th and 111th Congress, serving on the Immigration, Citizenship, Refugees, Border Security, and International Law Subcommittee. During that same period of time, he was the Chair of the Subcommittee on Financial Institutions and Consumer Credit of the Financial Services Committee.

Gutiérrez was a member of the House Baltic Caucus, the Congressional Arts Caucus and the United States Congressional International Conservation Caucus.

== Mayoral candidacy speculation ==
Gutiérrez' name has often been mentioned as a potential candidate for Mayor of Chicago. In 2006, he explored running for mayor of Chicago against incumbent Richard M. Daley, but announced in November that he would remain in Congress.

After Daley declared his retirement in 2011, Gutiérrez' name was once again floated as a potential mayoral candidate. In an effort to draft the Congressman into the race, students formed chapters of "Students for Luis Gutiérrez" at six colleges and two Chicago public high schools; but in October, Gutiérrez removed his name from consideration, stating, "I have an obligation not to give up on the fight I've already begun. I have unfinished business to complete", in reference to his work on immigration reform in the United States Congress.

After mayor Rahm Emanuel dropped out of the 2019 mayoral election in early September 2018, Gutiérrez stated that he was considering either running himself, or having Jesús "Chuy" García (the 2015 mayoral runner-up who was, at the time, running as the Democratic nominee to succeed Gutiérrez in congress) run for mayor. Ultimately, on September 12 (a week after declaring interest), he opted against running, and publicly called for Garcia to run. By the start of October, Garcia had declared that he would not be running either.

== Personal life ==
Gutiérrez has been married to Soraida Arocho Gutiérrez since 1977. Together, they have two daughters – Omaira and Jessica. Jessica's middle name – Washington – comes from the late Mayor Harold Washington, a close friend and mentor of Gutiérrez. Soraida battled and survived cancer in the 2000s.

Roberto Maldonado, 26th ward alderman and former Cook County Commissioner, is Gutiérrez' former brother-in-law.

Gutiérrez is an avid golfer.

== Electoral history ==
Illinois's 4th congressional district: Results 1992–2006
Year	Democrat	Votes	Pct	Republican	Votes	Pct	Third party	Votes	Pct
1992	Luis Gutiérrez	90,452	77.6%	Hildegarde Rodriguez-Schieman	26,154	22.4%			
1994	Luis Gutiérrez (inc.)	46,695	75.2%	Steven Valtierra	15,384	24.8%			
1996	Luis Gutiérrez (inc.)	85,278	93.6%				William Passmore (Libertarian)	5,857	6.4%
1998	Luis Gutiérrez (inc.)	54,244	81.7%	John Birch	10,529	15.9%	William Passmore (Libertarian)	1,583	2.4%
2000	Luis Gutiérrez (inc.)	89,487	88.6%				Stephanie Sailor (Libertarian)	11,476	11.4%
2002	Luis Gutiérrez (inc.)	67,339	79.7%	Anthony J. Lopez-Cisneros	12,778	15.1%	Maggie Kohls (Libertarian)	4,396	5.2%
2004	Luis Gutiérrez (inc.)	104,761	83.7%	Anthony J. Lopez-Cisneros	15,536	12.4%	Jake Witmer (Libertarian)	4,845	3.9%
2006	Luis Gutiérrez (inc.)	69,910	85.8%	Ann Melichar	11,532	14.2%			
2008	Luis Gutiérrez (inc.)	112,529	80.6%	Daniel Cunningham	16,024	11.5%	Omar N. López (Green)	11,053	7.9%
2010	Luis Gutiérrez (inc.)	63,273	77.4%	Israel Vasquez	11,711	14.3%	Robert J. Burns (Green)	6,808	8.3%
2012	Luis Gutiérrez (inc.)	133,226	83%	Héctor Concepción	27,279	17%	Ymelda Viramontes (Write-in)	4	0%
2014	Luis Gutiérrez (inc.)	79,666	78.1%	Héctor Concepción	22,278	21.9%			
2016	Luis Gutiérrez (inc.)	171,297	100%						

== See also ==
- List of Hispanic and Latino Americans in the United States Congress

U.S. House of Representatives
Preceded by George Sangmeister	Member of the U.S. House of Representatives from Illinois's 4th congressional district 1993–2019	Succeeded by Chuy García
U.S. order of precedence (ceremonial)
Preceded by Steve Chabot as Former U.S. Representative	Order of precedence of the United States as Former U.S. Representative	Succeeded by Martin Frost as Former U.S. Representative
