= Jeri Thomson =

American political administrator

30th Secretary of the United States Senate
- In office July 12, 2001 – January 3, 2003
- Leader: Tom Daschle
- Preceded by: Gary Lee Sisco
- Succeeded by: Emily J. Reynolds

Personal details
- Spouse: David James
- Children: 2
- Education: University of Washington; Harvard University (Kodak Fellow)

Jeri Thomson is an American political administrator who served as the 30th Secretary of the United States Senate from 2001 to 2003. She oversaw Senate operations during the aftermath of the September 11 attacks and the 2001 anthrax attacks on Capitol Hill, coordinating security, continuity of operations, and the decontamination of Senate office buildings in cooperation with the Sergeant at Arms.

== Early life and education ==
Thomson grew up in Washington state and attended the University of Washington. She completed the Senior Managers in Government program at Harvard University as a Kodak Fellow.

== Career ==
Thomson began her Capitol Hill career as a senior staff member to U.S. Senator John V. Tunney. She subsequently served as a special assistant in the Office of the Senate Sergeant at Arms and as deputy director of the Democratic Congressional Campaign Committee.

From 1989 to 1995 she served as assistant secretary of the Senate, functioning as chief operating officer for the Office of the Secretary. From 1995 to 2000 she was the Democratic representative in the Office of the Sergeant at Arms.

== Secretary of the Senate ==
Thomson was elected by the Senate and sworn in as secretary on July 12, 2001, succeeding Gary Lee Sisco. Her term concluded on January 6, 2003, and she was succeeded by Emily J. Reynolds.

During her tenure Thomson managed institutional responses to two major disruptions, the terrorist attacks of September 11, 2001, and the subsequent anthrax contamination of Senate offices in October 2001. Her office implemented continuity-of-operations plans, coordinated with security officials, and oversaw extensive decontamination and relocation efforts to keep the Senate functioning. In March 2003 the Senate formally commended Thomson for her service.

== Honors and recognition ==
In 1993 Thomson was named among the top 100 data-processing leaders in government, industry, and academia for her work modernizing Senate legislative processes.

== Personal life ==
Thomson is married to David James. They have two daughters.

== See also ==
- Secretary of the United States Senate
- 2001 anthrax attacks
- United States Capitol Visitor Center
