= United States House Education Subcommittee on Healthy Families and Communities =

The House Subcommittee on Healthy Families and Communities is a former subcommittee within the United States House Committee on Education and Labor. It was also known as the Subcommittee on Select Education. The subcommittee was eliminated in 2011, and its jurisdiction transferred to other subcommittees.

== Jurisdiction ==
From the Official Subcommittee website, the Subcommittee's jurisdiction includes:

- Adolescent development and training programs, including but not limited to those providing for the care and treatment of certain at risk youth, including the Juvenile Justice and Delinquency Prevention Act and the Runaway and Homeless Youth Act; all matters dealing with child abuse and domestic violence, including the Child Abuse Prevention and Treatment Act, and child adoption; school lunch and child nutrition, poverty programs including the Community Services Block Grant Act, and the Low Income Home Energy Assistance Program (LIHEAP); all matters dealing with programs and services for the elderly, including nutrition programs and the Older Americans Act; environmental education; all domestic volunteer programs; library services and construction, and programs related to the arts and humanities, museum services, and arts and artifacts indemnity.

== Current members, 111th Congress ==
Majority	Minority
Carolyn McCarthy, New York, Chairwoman; Yvette Clarke, New York; Carol Shea-Porter, New Hampshire; Bobby Scott, Virginia; Paul Tonko, New York; Jared Polis, Colorado; George Miller, California; Judy Chu, California	Todd Russell Platts, Pennsylvania, Ranking Member; Howard McKeon, California; Brett Guthrie, Kentucky; Phil Roe, Tennessee; Glenn "G.T." Thompson, Pennsylvania
Ex officio
	John Kline, Minnesota
