= Tom Kilgore =

American businessman

Tom D. Kilgore is an American businessman and former chief executive officer of the Tennessee Valley Authority, the first person to hold that position.

== Professional career ==
Earliy in his career, Kilgore worked for Arkansas Power & Light (a subsidiary of Entergy), Carolina Power & Light, and for the U.S. Department of Defense at Pine Bluff Arsenal in Jefferson County, Arkansas.

Kilgore led Oglethorpe Power Corporation in Georgia from 1984 until 1998, and was CEO the last seven years. In 1997, three companies formed in the restructuring of Oglethorpe Power: Oglethorpe Power, Georgia Transmission and Georgia System Operations. Kilgore was president and CEO of all three companies.

As leader of the largest company in the world named for James Edward Oglethorpe, Kilgore was on a commission to celebrate the Oglethorpe Tercentenary in 1996. Kilgore and his wife were members of the official Georgia Delegation to England.

After leaving Progress Energy in 2005, where he was group president Progress Ventures, Kilgore was appointed Chief Operating Officer of the TVA.

The TVA Board of Directors made the appointment on October 13, 2006, at a meeting in Knoxville, Tennessee. The Consolidated Appropriations Act of 2005 (Title VI—Reform of the Board of Directors of the Tennessee Valley Authority) established the CEO position as part of the change in governance structure from a three-member board to the current nine-member board. He earned $4.029 million in federal fiscal year 2012 (for the period ending 09/30/12). He retired at the end of 2012 and was succeeded by Bill Johnson. At TVA, Kilgore had responsibility for three operating nuclear plants located in Tennessee and Alabama.

Kilgore was elected to Nuclear Energy Institute’s Executive Committee for a three-year term July 6, 2005.

== Background ==
A native of Sand Mountain, DeKalb County, Alabama, Kilgore earned his mechanical engineering degree in 1970 from the University of Alabama. In 2008, in honor of his wife, Kilgore established the Myra Blevins Kilgore Endowed Scholarship for the University of Alabama College of Engineering. The State of Alabama inducted Kilgore into its Engineering Hall of Fame in 2002. He also earned the master's degree in industrial engineering from Texas A&M University.

Kilgore is on the board of directors of the Electric Power Research Institute (EPRI), the Institute of Nuclear Power Operations (INPO), and on the executive committee of the Nuclear Energy Institute (NEI). He has also been a member of the industry advisory board of the American Society of Mechanical Engineers (ASME).

He served in the U.S. Army from 1970 to 1972.

Kilgore and his wife, Myra, have a daughter, two sons, and eight grandchildren.
