= Michael Nardulli =

American politician

Member of the Chicago City Council from the 27th ward
- In office 1979–1986
- Preceded by: Stanley M. Zydlo
- Succeeded by: Luis Gutiérrez

Member of the Illinois State Senate
- In office 1975–1979

Personal details
- Born: October 31, 1920 Chicago, Illinois, U.S.
- Died: April 14, 2007 (age 86) Chicago, Illinois, U.S.
- Party: Democratic

Military service
- Allegiance: United States
- Branch/service: Army
- Battles/wars: World War II

Michael L. Nardulli (October 31, 1920 – April 14, 2007) was an American politician.

Born in Chicago, Illinois, Nardulli went to Wells High School. He served in the United States Army during World War II. Nardulli was involved with the Democratic Party. Nardulli served in the Illinois House of Representatives from 1975 to 1979. He then served on the Chicago City Council from 1979 to 1986. Mardulli served on the Illinois Pollution Control Board from 1987 to 1994. Nardulli died at his home in Chicago, Illinois.
