= Enhanced Border Security and Visa Entry Reform Act of 2002 =

- Sponsored by: Jim Sensenbrenner

Legislative history
- Introduced in the House as H.R. 3525 by Jim Sensenbrenner on December 19, 2001; Passed the House on December 19, 2001 (Voice vote); Passed the Senate on April 18, 2002 (97-0; House agreed to Senate changes with 411-0 vote on May 8, 2002); Signed into law by President George W. Bush on May 14, 2002

The Enhanced Border Security and Visa Entry Reform Act of 2002 (Pub. L. 107–173 (text) (PDF)) is an Act of the United States that deals with immigration. It covers the funding of the Immigration and Naturalization Service (INS), orders that all internal INS databases must be linked together and be fully interoperable with the then-in-development "Chimera" (biometric based) system in order to improve information sharing, makes further regulations in regards to the issuance of Visas, and regulates the inspection and admission of aliens. Currently, much of the Act is yet to be implemented, due to delays in developing the biometric based data system.
