= Gary Sisco =

American political administrator

Gary Lee Sisco

29th Secretary of the United States Senate
- In office October 1, 1996 – July 11, 2001
- Leader: Trent Lott
- Preceded by: Kelly D. Johnston
- Succeeded by: Jeri Thomson

Personal details
- Born: October 1, 1945 (age 81) Bolivar, Tennessee, U.S.
- Education: B.S., University of Mississippi (1967) M.S., George Washington University (1970)

Military service
- Allegiance: United States
- Branch/service: United States Army
- Years of service: 1968–1970

Gary Lee Sisco (born October 1, 1945 in Bolivar, Tennessee) is an American government administrator and consultant. He served as the 29th Secretary of the United States Senate from 1996 to 2001, overseeing major administrative reforms and presiding over the chamber’s logistics during the 1999 impeachment trial of President Bill Clinton.

== Early life and education ==
Sisco was born in Bolivar, Tennessee, to Robert Sisco, who served as Hardeman County sheriff. He received a Bachelor of Science degree in civil engineering from the University of Mississippi in 1967 and a Master of Science in administration from George Washington University in 1970.

== Early career ==
After graduation Sisco worked as a systems engineer with IBM. He served in the United States Army from 1968 to 1970, attaining the rank of captain. Sisco later joined the staff of Senator Howard H. Baker Jr., managed Lamar Alexander’s 1974 Tennessee gubernatorial campaign, and became administrative assistant to Representative Robin Beard in 1975.

== Secretary of the Senate ==
Sisco was elected secretary on October 1, 1996. He implemented the Senate’s first enterprise‑wide Financial Management Information System and coordinated administrative preparations for the Clinton impeachment trial. Following the shift to Democratic control in June 2001 he resigned, effective July 11. On the day of his departure the Senate unanimously adopted a resolution commending his service.

He is to date, the last male secretary of the Senate.

Key achievements during his term included:

- Modernizing the Senate's financial systems, including the implementation of a new Financial Management Information System.
- Overseeing administrative logistics for the 1999 impeachment trial of President Clinton, including the formal receipt of impeachment articles from the House.
- Coordinating planning and funding for the Capitol Visitor Center.
- Managing nonpartisan operations during a period of intense political division, earning bipartisan praise for his professionalism.

== Later career ==
After leaving government Sisco became a senior adviser at Manatt, Phelps & Phillips and established Sisco Consulting, registering clients in the telecommunications and mapping‑software sectors.

== See also ==
- Secretary of the United States Senate
- Impeachment of Bill Clinton
- Trent Lott
- United States Capitol Visitor Center
