= Giuseppe Nardulli =

Italian physicist (1948–2008)

Giuseppe Nardulli (6 July 1948 – 26 June 2008) was an Italian physicist based in Bari.

He was a Professor of theoretical physics at the University of Bari, and a member of the National Institute of Nuclear Physics (INFN). Nardulli was also active in the areas of peace, weapons control, and nuclear disarmament. His research fields were elementary particle physics and neural networks.

== Biography ==
Born in Bari on 6 July 1948, Nardulli was awarded the Laurea cum laude in Physics at the University of Bari on 29 March 1972.

Prior to becoming a professor of Theoretical Physics at the University of Bari in 1994, he served as a fellow (1974–77), assistant professor (1977-1983), and associate professor of Statistical Mechanics (1983-1994) at the same university.

He was also a visiting Scientist at CERN-Geneva (April–July 1983), at JINR-Dubna USSR (May–July 1987), at Centre de Physique Theorique-CNRS, Marseille (July–December 1984) and Paris (July 1994); Professor at the University of Marseille-Aix-en-Provence (September 1990); Scientific Associate at the Theory Division of CERN (Fall-Winter 1999–2000) and at CTP-MIT (Fall 2002).

Nardulli was the author of approx. 200 scientific papers and proceedings, and a widely used university textbook on Quantum Mechanics. He was the national coordinator of the INFN-funded research project "Phenomenology of Gauge Theories" (BA21); the national coordinator of the INFN-funded "Neuronet" research project; the coordinator of the Theory Group of INFN-Bari; and the coordinator of national relevant research projects funded by the Italian Ministry of Education.

Nardulli organized several workshops on High Energy Physics and was the editor of their proceedings. He also served as Director of the Center TIRES (Center of Innovative Technologies for Signal Detection and Processing) at the University of Bari, and Director of the postgraduate course on Technologies for Peace and Disarmament at the University of Bari, Italy.

Nardulli died on June 26, 2008, at the age of 59, following a battle with cancer.
