= Progressive talk radio =

Talk radio format

Progressive talk radio is a talk radio format devoted to expressing left-leaning viewpoints of news and issues as opposed to conservative talk radio. In the United States, the format has included syndicated and independent personalities such as Arnie Arnesen, Michael Brooks, Alan Colmes, Jon Favreau, Al Franken, Brad Friedman, John Fugelsang, Norman Goldman, Amy Goodman, Thom Hartmann, Ana Kasparian, Kyle Kulinski, Jon Lovett, Rachel Maddow, Mike Malloy, Stephanie Miller, Michael Moore, David Pakman, Mike Papantonio, Dan Pfeiffer, Bill Press, Randi Rhodes, Ed Schultz, Sam Seder (The Majority Report with Sam Seder), Hal Sparks, Cenk Uygur, and Tommy Vietor.

In contrast to conservative talk, progressive talk has historically been far less popular on commercial terrestrial radio; it briefly had some modest mainstream success for a period from the mid-2000s (decade) to the early 2010s. The format has been more popular on emerging technologies such as podcasting and Internet radio, which have accelerated the popularity and dominance of Crooked Media through podcasts like Pod Save America.

== History ==
Progressive talk radio programs in markets across the U.S. have existed for many decades. The Chicago Federation of Labor (via WCFL) and Socialist Party of America (via WEVD in New York City) each launched radio stations in the 1920s as organs for progressive political activism. In the 1960s, freeform rock stations featured outspoken air personalities who mixed progressive rock with controversial commentary and news reports on current events such as the Vietnam War and the Civil Rights Movement. A few talk stations, such as WMCA in New York City and WERE in Cleveland carried controversial counterculture talk programming. Politically oriented talk radio stations often featured liberal hosts such as Alan Berg and Alex Bennett sharing the schedule with more conservative personalities. The Fairness Doctrine and equal-time rules effectively required that stations broadcasting controversial political content also provide airtime for the opposing viewpoint; progressive stations such as WMCA would thus usually have a "house conservative" (in WMCA's case, Bob Grant) to maintain balance. One of the most notable liberal talk-show hosts was Michael Jackson, who had a show for 35 years at KABC in Los Angeles, often commenting on both political and national issues.

Two developments in the late 1980s – the struggle of AM radio music formats against FM, and the repeal of the Federal Communications Commission (FCC) "fairness doctrine" – set the stage for the growth of more political talk programming. Conservative commentator Rush Limbaugh became one of the early success stories of this new radio environment, helped by a syndication arrangement that was financially appealing to local stations. Many other radio hosts used his show as a model. During the 1990s, radio stations found that a schedule of mostly conservative radio drew more listeners than liberal or mixed programming.

From the mid-1990s to the early 2000s, few liberal talk hosts had national exposure. Shock jocks Don Imus and Tom Leykis were sometimes described as liberal, though their shows were not based on political ideology. Syndicated efforts from Jim Hightower and Mario Cuomo were short-lived. Hightower publishes The Hightower Lowdown newsletter (2015) and is still producing audio insight segments heard on various media broadcasts.

There were some notable local liberal hosts during this period: Ed Schultz in Fargo, North Dakota; Randi Rhodes in West Palm Beach, Florida; Bernie Ward in San Francisco, California; Mike Malloy in Atlanta, Georgia; and Michael Jackson in Los Angeles, California. The UAW-owned network i.e. America had over 30 affiliates, including Sirius Satellite Radio, and a lineup of Doug Stephan, Nancy Skinner, Thom Hartmann, Peter Werbe, Mike Malloy, and The Young Turks. New management at the UAW was unenthusiastic about being in the network radio business and in 2003 went silent. Doug Stephan (not an overt liberal), Thom Hartmann, and The Young Turks continued on the air, with Stephan on over 300 affiliates, Hartmann holding about 25 (plus Sirius), and the Turks holding their spot on Sirius, all three being independently owned and syndicated.

In September 2002, Democratic strategist Tom Athans and radio veteran Paul Fiddick joined forces to create Democracy Radio, a production company focused on creating and funding progressive talk programs. Their concept was to develop and incubate liberal oriented talk talent and enlist radio networks to market their programs to stations around the country. Democracy Radio developed and produced talk shows that launched the national careers of Ed Schultz and Stephanie Miller, among others.

In December 2002, Thom Hartmann wrote an op-ed for commondreams.org titled "Talking Back To Talk Radio" which posited - based on Hartmann's experience as both on-air talent and being a program director back in the 1960s and 1970s - that progressive talk radio could be a profitable format if done right. That article interested Sheldon and Anita Drobney, venture capitalists from Chicago, who brought Hartmann on as a consultant and hired Jon Sinton to form what would become Air America. (Detailed in Drobney's book The Road to Air America, including a reprint of Hartmann's early article.)

The dominance of conservative talk radio caused concern among some liberals and political independents, who viewed it as an integral part of promoting conservative policies and Republican Party candidates. After the failure of i.e. America, and with the aid of private investors, two projects came to fruition in early 2004 as an alternative to right-wing talk radio.

The first was the January 2004 debut of The Ed Schultz Show, featuring a "meat eating, gun-toting lefty" out of Fargo, North Dakota. Created and produced by Democracy Radio and distributed by large radio syndicator Jones Radio Networks, the show picked up 70 stations by the end of its first year of syndication. The second project was the March 31, 2004, launch of Air America Radio, a liberal full-service talk radio network. The fledgling network started with only a handful of stations, mostly lower power AM signals. Early financial difficulties led to the loss of affiliates in Los Angeles and Chicago.

Air America's original flagship affiliate, WLIB in New York, had some early ratings success despite a modest signal. In their first month, their midday block featuring (later Senator) Al Franken drew more listeners in the demographic category desired by advertisers than competing stations featuring Limbaugh and Bill O'Reilly.

Another original Air America affiliate was KPOJ, a struggling AM station in Portland, Oregon with a 25,000-watt signal but an underperforming oldies format. They ran the entire Air America lineup with one exception, replacing the early "Unfiltered" show (with Rachel Maddow) with Schultz's afternoon show on a time-delay – a schedule that several other stations would soon emulate – and called the format "Progressive Talk". In its first ratings period following the switch, KPOJ went from the bottom to being one of the market's top-rated stations. The station's owner, media giant Clear Channel Communications, decided to roll out the format on many of their other struggling AM stations across the country. More than 20 of their stations switched to liberal talk within the following year, which included major markets such as Los Angeles, Boston, Washington, D.C., Detroit, Seattle, and Miami.

By early 2006, approximately 90 stations were carrying at least part of the Air America lineup. The growth of the format created opportunities for additional programming. Democracy Radio and Jones Radio rolled out shows hosted by Stephanie Miller in September 2004. Bill Press launched in (September 2005). Established hosts such as Alan Colmes and Lionel saw increases in the number of affiliates carrying their shows. Ron Reagan (son of Ronald Reagan) was also featured. On September 1, 2006, Air America's flagship station moved to WWRL.

After its growth spurt in 2004–2006, the liberal talk format had some setbacks. Over a spread of time following the November 2006 elections, Clear Channel increased its purchasing of talk radio stations, changing many of its liberal talk shows to other formats. Their announced plan to change the format in Madison, Wisconsin was dropped as the result of a successful listener campaign, but a similar campaign to get the station to retain the format did not work in Columbus, Ohio. An unrelated Columbus station (WVKO) picked up the liberal talk programming later that year. Air America filed for bankruptcy in October 2006, and was sold to new investors in February 2007, though they maintained operations during that time. Air America's highest-rated host, Al Franken, left in February 2007 to run for Senate and was replaced on the network by Thom Hartmann live in the noon-3 PM ET. Hartmann held Franken's ratings in most markets, regularly beating O'Reilly in Los Angeles, and beating Limbaugh in Portland and Seattle in 2007 and 2008.

Currently, there are fewer than 100 U.S. commercial radio stations carrying liberal talk programs particularly due to the Clear Channel terrestrial radio station purchases and subsequent talk format changes. The stations gained by Clear Channel contributed to Rush Limbaugh retaining around 600 stations, 500 for Sean Hannity etcetera – although conservative talk radio ratings have declined substantially. AM radio in particular has switched over to business, sports, health, religious and other programming.

An example of the liberal talk format's struggles is in Boston, where Clear Channel put it on AM 1200 and 1430 from 2004 until 2006. A short time later, host Jeff Santos began buying time on WWZN AM 1510 in Boston airing his own show plus syndicated offerings such as Ed Schultz and Stephanie Miller. As money dried up, and after other national hosts were offered such as Al Sharpton, his brokered time on WWZN shrank to his own show, and then that was cut loose in the fall of 2012 as the station went to all sports.

On January 21, 2010, Air America announced that it would immediately cease programming, and the company would file for Chapter 7 bankruptcy; stating the following on their website:

The very difficult economic environment has had a significant impact on Air America's business. This past year has seen a "perfect storm" in the media industry generally. National and local advertising revenues have fallen drastically, causing many media companies nationwide to fold or seek bankruptcy protection. From large to small, recent bankruptcies like Citadel Broadcasting and closures like that of the industry's long-time trade publication Radio and Records have signaled that these are very difficult and rapidly changing times.

Premiere Radio Networks, Clear Channel's national syndication division and home to Rush Limbaugh, signed its first liberal host in 2009. Clear Channel-owned WJNO personality Randi Rhodes, who had been dropped from both Air America and the now-defunct Nova M Radio, returned to the airwaves in May 2009 on the satellites of Premiere, with Clear Channel's Progressive Talk stations, many of which previously carried Rhodes' show, serving as the linchpin of a national syndication effort. With Randi Rhodes eventually leaving talk radio, the Nicole Sandler Show gathered many of Randi's listeners via internet streaming at Radio or Not. Leslie Marshall, is another woman show host who is popular and widely heard. Arianna Huffington and other women in radio and television have had a significant history and are key players in the growth of the talk genre (see also Oprah Winfrey).

Democracy Radio contributed to the creation of the progressive genre, and impacted the success of Ed Schultz and Stephanie Miller. Now with Dial Global, talkers Ed Schultz, Stephanie Miller, Thom Hartmann, and Bill Press all enjoy a following with Schultz (later transitioning to MSNBC) and Hartman.

In Portland, Oregon, KPOJ was the Progressive Talk radio station on AM 620 from the time of Air America Radio. Its success netted it a stronger signal strength, and it could be heard to the coast and to Mt. St. Helens in Washington State, etc. The station was profitable and had been mentioned as a model for other progressive talk stations. Listeners supported the station and there was a growing base. The format was changed without any public announcement on November 10, 2012, at 5:30 pm to Fox Sports Radio.

In December 2012, Seattle's Progressive Talk announced it was switching formats from progressive talk to sports in January 2013. Despite many efforts to keep KPTK, it switched to CBS Sports Radio; both KPOJ and KPTK's new formats have earned them dead last in ratings. In January 2014, progressive talk lost three of its largest markets; in Los Angeles and San Francisco, Clear Channel/iHeartMedia replaced it with conservative talk, and in New York City, the local progressive talk station switched to ethnic programming. Following these losses, several of the remaining progressive talk hosts discontinued their shows, including Randi Rhodes and Ed Schultz.

Ironically, an attack on conservative talk helped ensure the demise of progressive talk on traditional radio: the Rush Limbaugh–Sandra Fluke controversy and the subsequent advertiser blacklist scared away advertisers from progressive, conservative and even neutral political talk, fearing further controversies and campaigns against them.

Independently owned stations such as WCPT in Chicago (2015) persistently maintain years of popularity and retain a full line-up of progressive hosts, including Amy Goodman and Juan Gonzalez on Democracy Now!, Zero Hour with Richard Eskow plus Thom Hartmann, Norman Goldman, Stephanie Miller, Bill Press, and previous former co-host of Hannity and Colmes, the late Alan Colmes. While progressive talk is sustained on fewer terrestrial stations, the web of new progressive hosts is exhibiting expansion and changing styles.

Carrying his own show style of "fierce independence" (2015), Norman Goldman began as "Senior Legal Analyst" and fill-in host for Ed Schultz, providing legal expertise and contributing information on MSNBC. Goldman's national talk show focuses on callers and news, with regular guest interviews with award-winning LA Times contributor and president of Consumer Watchdog, Jamie Court - as well as Alex Seitz-Wald, political reporter for MSNBC. Seitz-Wald has also written for National Journal, Salon, ThinkProgress and The Atlantic. Host of "I've Got Issues," Wayne Besen and Hal Sparks both substitute-host for Goldman.

The Stephanie Miller Show has included includes guests like Hal Sparks, who has his own radio program on Chicago's Progressive Talk as host of The Hal Sparks Radio Program (megaworldwide). (As of February 2014, Sparks no longer appears on Miller's show.) Sparks airs on such channels as CNN and programs such as The Joy Behar Show and The View. In 2011 he joined Stephanie Miller and John Fugelsang for the Sexy Liberal Comedy Tour. Miller's other guests include Democratic strategist Karl Frisch, Jacki Schechner, Bob Cesca, Valerie Jarrett (one of President Obama's longest serving advisers and confidantes and was "widely tipped for a high-profile position in an Obama administration), and John Fugelsang. Hosts Brad Friedman and Desi Doyen are heard on radio-aired segments, The Green News Report. Substitute show personalities noted here illustrate how program popularity (and social media) can influence the rise of new talk shows and personalities.

By January 2017, the migration of progressive talk to off-air and noncommercial radio left a severe shortage of programming for commercial radio stations; by one estimate, fewer than ten progressive talk stations remained in the United States, many of which were forced to change to other formats (examples including WXXM-Madison, Wisconsin and WNYY-Ithaca, New York) despite their relative popularity in their cities to maintain full 24-hour schedules. By the early 2020s progressive talk began to resurge in the Upper Midwest returning to the Madison and Milwaukee radio markets with former syndicated WXXM host Michael Crute owned WTTN and WAUK offering primarily locally programmed shows. The region also continues to be served by Chicago's WCPT and KTNF in the Twin Cities which have proven to be two of the more resilient progressive talk stations.

== New media ==
When early podcasts became available through iTunes, Al Franken's show was the second-most popular. Providers of liberal radio shows such as Head On Radio Network made streaming and podcasting integral to their operations.

Contemporary talk, music, sports and newscasts are significantly branching out to the internet and Smartphone App choices such as TuneIn Radio. Many independent and liberal talk show hosts offer podcast (digital audio Play-On-Demand recordings, see also iPod) subscriptions to support their on-going broadcasts. These are in addition to on-line website streaming, audio and video, and YouTube channels of the show hosts. Norman Goldman, Stephanie Miller, and Ring of Fire are examples of hosts offering podcast subscriptions for sale to sustain their programs and offer additional value to their show content. Norman Goldman's "Beyond the Norm" legal and consumer advice segments are only available by podcast subscription. Often these broadcasts can be commercial-free to make their user-efficiency a plus for the purchase price. Stephanie Miller's Happy Hour podcasts project the host's "sexy liberal" approach more boldly. Podcast subscriptions may also be accessed through the particular host's own separate smartphone app, boasting the advantage of play-anytime convenience.

Another media development exists where talk radio shows such as Thom Hartmann, Democracy Now!, Stephanie Miller, Ring of Fire, The David Pakman Show and Bill Press are simulcast on Free Speech TV. In recent years, FSTV's television footprint has grown to more than 40 million homes. The network's monthly viewership (cume) nearly doubled to more than 1 million households over a two-year period between 2012 and 2014. YouTube channels are also used by many host/commentators on this page, and others such as Lionel (radio personality), Mike Malloy, Bill Press and Norman Goldman

Webster Tarpley hosts a progressive program, World Crisis Radio, on GCN on Saturdays 1-3pm CT. It is also available on his website Tarpley.net as a podcast and on various YouTube Channels.

Daniela Walls hosts the AmericanSystem.tv podcast Monday-Thursday. Her programs are unique in that they are not only center-left, but she is also a key political figure in the Tax Wall Street Party. Walls call for a 1% Wall Street Sales Tax, nationalizing the Federal Reserve, and an economic system based on that of Henry Clay.

Former Obama staffers Jon Favreau, Jon Lovett, and Tommy Vietor founded the popular media company Crooked Media in 2017 to succeed their popular podcast Keepin' It 1600, seeking to create a reliable media outlet for Democratic Party messaging to counter the GOP connections of media monopolies like Fox. Pod Save America is the flagship podcast of Crooked and it averages more than 1.5 million listeners an episode, being downloaded more than 120 million times as of November 2017. Crooked Media has expanded from its multiple popular U.S. podcasts to international shows such as the UK-based political commentary podcast Pod Save the UK hosted in part by comedian Nish Kumar.

== Online, old, and social media ==
The internet has become an important and growing factor in the distribution of liberal talk programming, with many radio stations and individual show hosts streaming their show as they are "on the air" live. Twitter and Facebook web pages exist for nearly every currently broadcasting progressive/liberal/independent talk show host(s) named here. Various television shows feature talk radio guests such as Stephanie Miller on CNN, Thom Hartmann on "Real Time with Bill Maher."

SiriusXM Satellite Radio, America's satellite radio provider, offers one channel of liberal talk. Sirius XM Progress, channel 127, airs the shows of Miller and Hartmann and originates the shows of Dean Obeidallah, Michelangelo Signorile, Xorje Olivares (Affirmative Reaction), John Fugelsang (Tell Me Everything), and the duo of Zerlina Maxwell and Jess McIntosh (Signal Boost).

Another notable example of liberal talk online is The Young Turks. They were the first original talk show on Sirius Satellite Radio and the first live, daily webcast on the internet. YouTube videos of numerous progressive, liberal and independent talk show hosts can be viewed as well. Hosts such as Norman Goldman and Stephanie Miller also offer video streaming of their live shows, accessed on their respective websites. Malloy has since moved his show to the internet. Liberal/independent talk show hosts have their own sources for relevant topics, and often derive research from websites and news organizations such as The Huffington Post, Daily Kos, Media Matters, Mother Jones, AlterNet, Common Dreams, Truthout, Harper's, Talking Points Memo, Salon.com, Electronic Frontier Foundation, Democrats.com, Democratic Underground, Public Citizen, MoveOn.org, Politico, ProPublica and many more.

=== Non-commercial outlets ===
The liberal non-profit Pacifica network has existed for many years, though their programming is broadcast on mostly small non-commercial radio stations in a limited number of cities; Pacifica itself has been prone to severe financial problems and internal turmoil, especially since the 1990s. The flagship program for Pacifica is Democracy Now!, which is also carried on many National Public Radio (NPR) affiliates, as well as the nationally syndicated talk radio and television program The David Pakman Show.

Not uncommon with the varied responses to many forms of media, critics have long accused NPR of having a liberal bias, though the network as well as parties on both sides of the political spectrum state that it reflects a diversity of views. The programs produced for non-commercial outlets are generally not "talk" programs—in that calls are not taken, with the focus on the opinions of the hosts or guests.

== See also ==
- Crooked Media
- The Majority Report
- Nova M Radio
- List of United States radio networks
- Radio network
- Talk show
