= Remorse (disambiguation) =

Remorse is an emotion that affects people who regret their past actions.

Remorse may also refer to:

- "Remorse" (House), television episode
- Remorse (painting), a painting by Louis-Marie Baader
- "Remorse" (Law & Order: Special Victims Unit), television episode
- "Remorse" (FBI), television episode
- Remorse (play), a play by Samuel Taylor Coleridge
- "The Remorse", a song from the Drake album Certified Lover Boy

== See also ==
- Buyer's Remorse
- No Remorse
