= Debbie Stabenow =

American politician (born 1950)

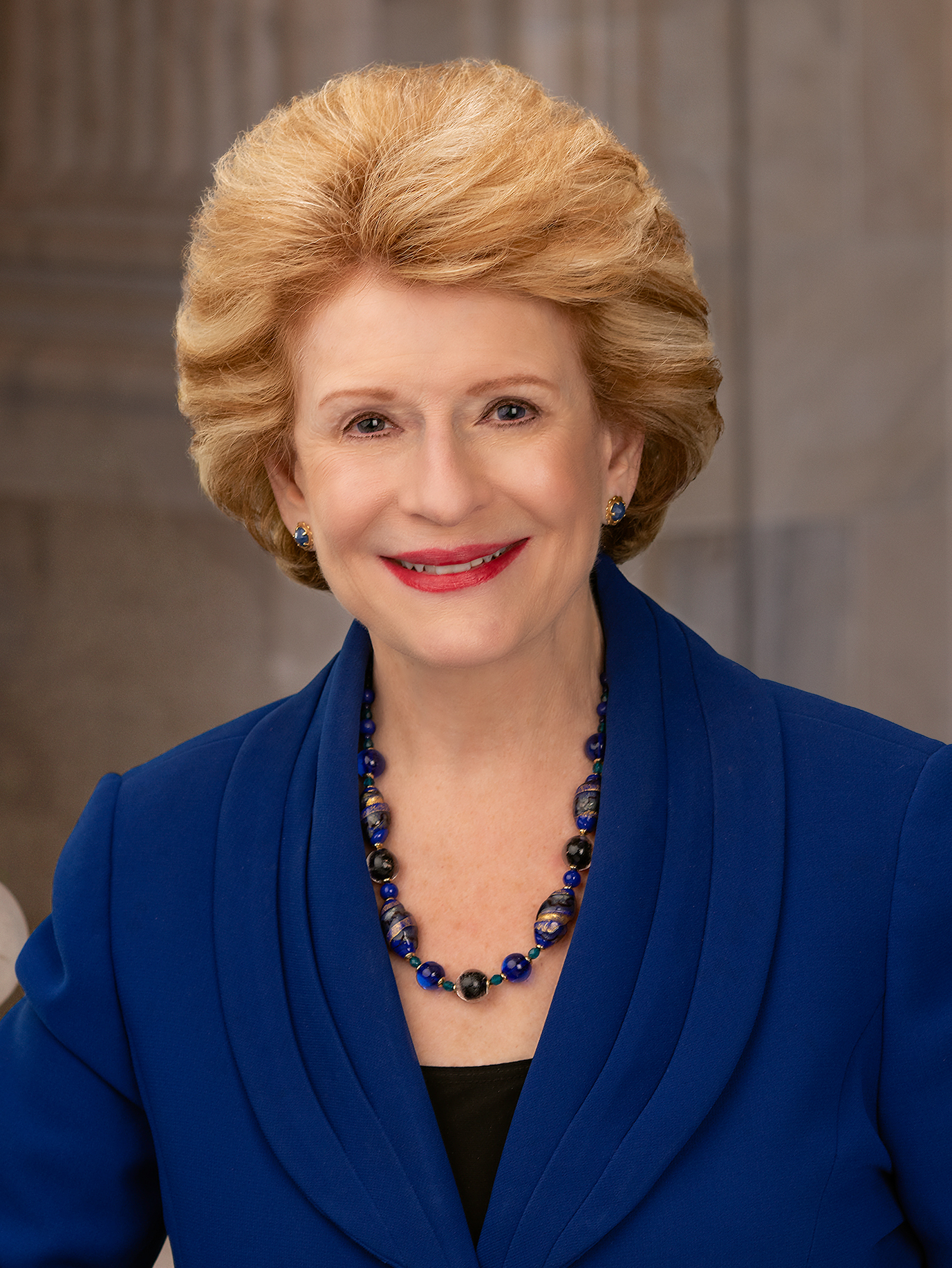
- Official portrait, 2019

United States Senator from Michigan
- In office January 3, 2001 – January 3, 2025
- Preceded by: Spencer Abraham
- Succeeded by: Elissa Slotkin
Committee positions
Chair of the Senate Democratic Policy and Communications Committee
In office January 3, 2017 – January 3, 2025 (Note: From 2017-2019 as Chair of the Senate Democratic Policy Committee.)
Leader	Chuck Schumer
Preceded by	Chuck Schumer
Succeeded by	Amy Klobuchar (Steering and Policy); Cory Booker (Strategic Communications)
Chair of the Senate Agriculture Committee
In office February 3, 2021 – January 3, 2025
Preceded by	Pat Roberts
Succeeded by	John Boozman
In office January 3, 2011 – January 3, 2015
Preceded by	Blanche Lincoln
Succeeded by	Pat Roberts
Ranking Member of the Senate Agriculture Committee
In office January 3, 2015 – February 3, 2021
Preceded by	Thad Cochran
Succeeded by	John Boozman
Secretary of the Senate Democratic Caucus
In office January 3, 2005 – January 3, 2007
Leader	Harry Reid
Preceded by	Barbara Mikulski
Succeeded by	Patty Murray

Member of the U.S. House of Representatives from Michigan's 8th district
- In office January 3, 1997 – January 3, 2001
- Preceded by: Dick Chrysler
- Succeeded by: Mike Rogers

Member of the Michigan Senate from the 24th district
- In office January 12, 1991 – January 14, 1994
- Preceded by: William A. Sederburg
- Succeeded by: Joe Schwarz

Member of the Michigan House of Representatives from the 58th district
- In office January 6, 1979 – January 12, 1991
- Preceded by: Thomas M. Holcomb
- Succeeded by: Dianne Byrum

Chair of the Ingham County Board of Commissioners
- In office January 1977 – January 1979
- Preceded by: Ken Hope
- Succeeded by: Bill Sweet

Member of the Ingham County Board of Commissioners from the 13th district
- In office January 1975 – January 1979
- Preceded by: Gordon Swix
- Succeeded by: Dennis Willard

Personal details
- Born: Deborah Ann Greer; April 29, 1950 (age 76) Gladwin, Michigan, U.S.
- Party: Democratic
- Spouses: Dennis Stabenow (m. 1971; div. 1989); Tom Athans (m. 2003; div. 2010)
- Children: 2
- Education: Michigan State University (BA, MSW)
- Stabenow's voice Stabenow supporting the Growing Climate Solutions Act. Recorded June 24, 2021

Deborah Ann Stabenow (/ˈstæbənaʊ/ STAB-ə-now; née Greer; born April 29, 1950) is an American politician who served as a United States senator from Michigan from 2001 to 2025. A member of the Democratic Party, she was Michigan's first female U.S. senator.

Before her election to the Senate, Stabenow was a member of the U.S. House of Representatives, representing Michigan's 8th congressional district from 1997 to 2001. Previously, she served on the Ingham County Board of Commissioners and in the Michigan State Legislature.

Stabenow was reelected to the Senate in 2006, 2012, and 2018. She became the state's senior senator upon Carl Levin's retirement in 2015. Stabenow chaired the Senate Agriculture Committee from 2011 to 2015 and again from 2021 to 2025. She became the chair of the Senate Democratic Policy Committee in 2017 and served in that role until she retired from the Senate. At the start of the 118th Congress, Stabenow became the dean of the Michigan congressional delegation, upon the retirement of Representative Fred Upton. On January 5, 2023, she announced that she would not seek reelection in 2024.

== Early life and education ==
Stabenow was born in Gladwin, Michigan, the daughter of Anna Merle (née Hallmark) and Robert Lee Greer. She grew up in Clare, Michigan. She graduated from Clare High School, where she was president of her junior class, the first female class president at the school. She received a Bachelor of Arts degree from Michigan State University in 1972. Also from Michigan State University, she earned a Master of Social Work magna cum laude in 1975.

== Early political career ==
=== Ingham County politics ===
While a graduate student at Michigan State University in 1974, Stabenow ran for public office for the first time, inspired by the threatened closure of a local nursing home. She won her first election in November 1974, becoming just the third woman elected to the Ingham County Board of Commissioners, on which she served from 1975 to 1978. Stabenow was the first woman and youngest person to date to chair the board of commissioners in 1977 and 1978. She was preceded as chair by one of her political mentors, Ken Hope. She was also instrumental in establishing a women's commission in Ingham County.

=== State legislature ===
In 1978, Stabenow challenged Michigan State Representative Tom Holcomb in a primary election. She won the primary and eventually the general election for the 58th House District. Stabenow served in the Michigan House of Representatives from 1979 to 1990. She became a force in state Democratic politics and the first woman in House leadership to preside over the House. In 1990, Stabenow ran for the Michigan Senate seat being vacated by William A. Sederburg. She won the election, taking office in 1991 and serving one term through 1994.

=== 1994 gubernatorial election ===
In 1994, Stabenow ran in Michigan's Democratic gubernatorial primary to challenge incumbent Republican John Engler in the general election. U.S. Congressman Howard Wolpe won the primary with a plurality of 35% of the vote to Stabenow's 30%. After the primary, Wolpe chose Stabenow as his running mate, and she appeared on the general election ballot as the Democratic nominee for lieutenant governor. Engler defeated the Wolpe–Stabenow ticket, 61% to 38%.

=== U.S. House of Representatives ===
In 1996, Stabenow ran for a seat in the United States House of Representatives, challenging incumbent Republican U.S. Congressman Dick Chrysler for the opportunity to represent Michigan's 8th congressional district. She defeated Chrysler 54%–44%. In 1998, she was reelected with 57% of the vote. In the House, Stabenow served on the Agriculture and Science Committees.

== U.S. Senate ==
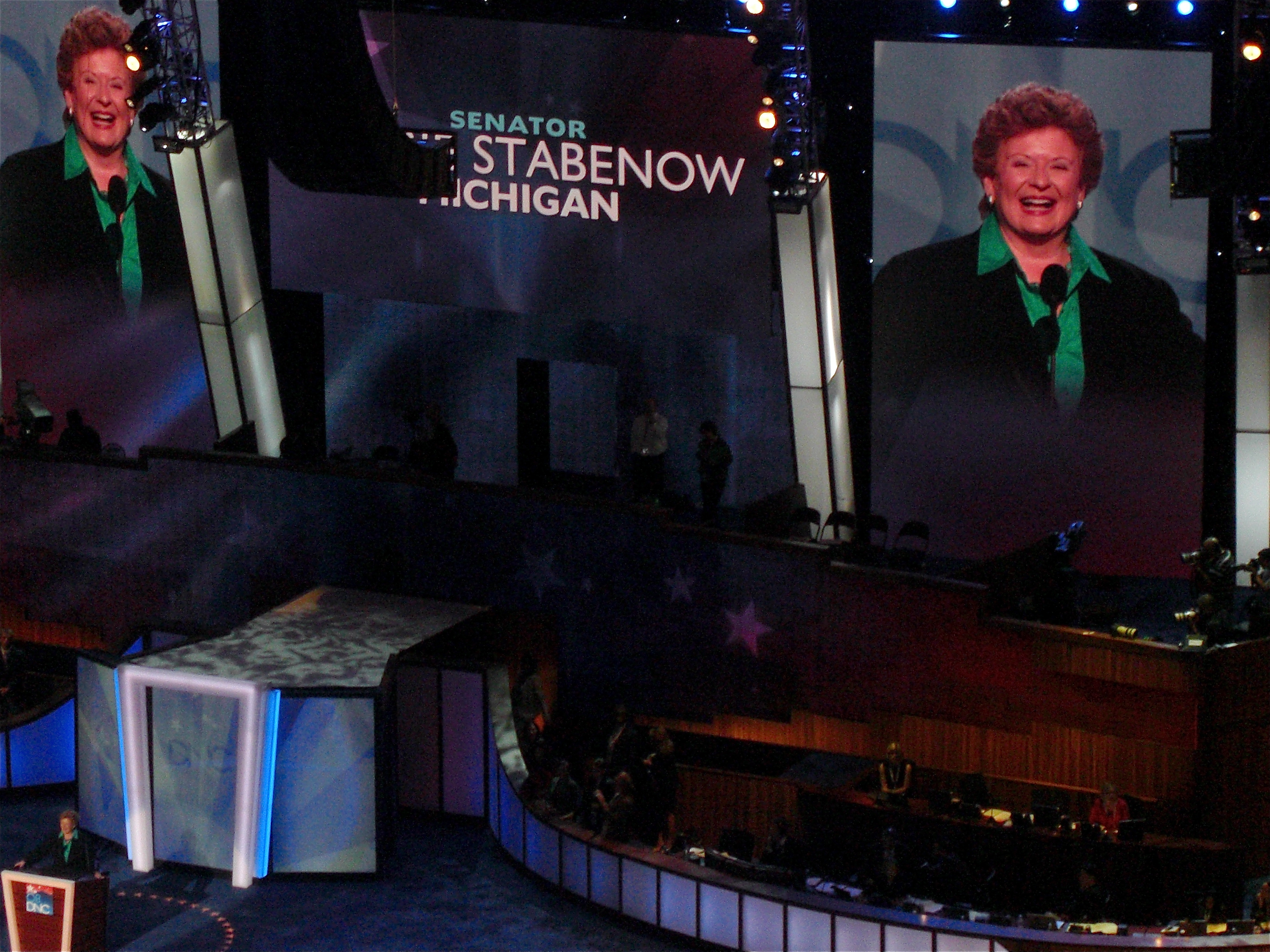
Stabenow speaking during the second day of the 2008 Democratic National Convention in Denver, Colorado

=== Elections ===
==== 2000 ====
Stabenow did not seek reelection to the House in 2000, choosing instead to challenge incumbent Republican U.S. Senator Spencer Abraham. She won the Democratic primary unopposed. In the general election, Stabenow defeated Abraham 49.5%–48% (a difference of 67,259 votes).

==== 2006 ====
Stabenow was challenged by Republican Michael Bouchard, Oakland County sheriff and former State Senate Majority Floor Leader. Stabenow defeated him 57%–41%.

==== 2012 ====
Stabenow was unopposed in the Democratic primary and defeated Republican nominee Pete Hoekstra, former U.S. representative, 59% to 38%.

==== 2018 ====
Stabenow was reelected to a fourth term, defeating Republican nominee John E. James, 52.3%–45.8%. The margin was 275,660 votes (6.50%), making this the closest U.S. Senate election in Michigan since 2000.

=== Tenure ===
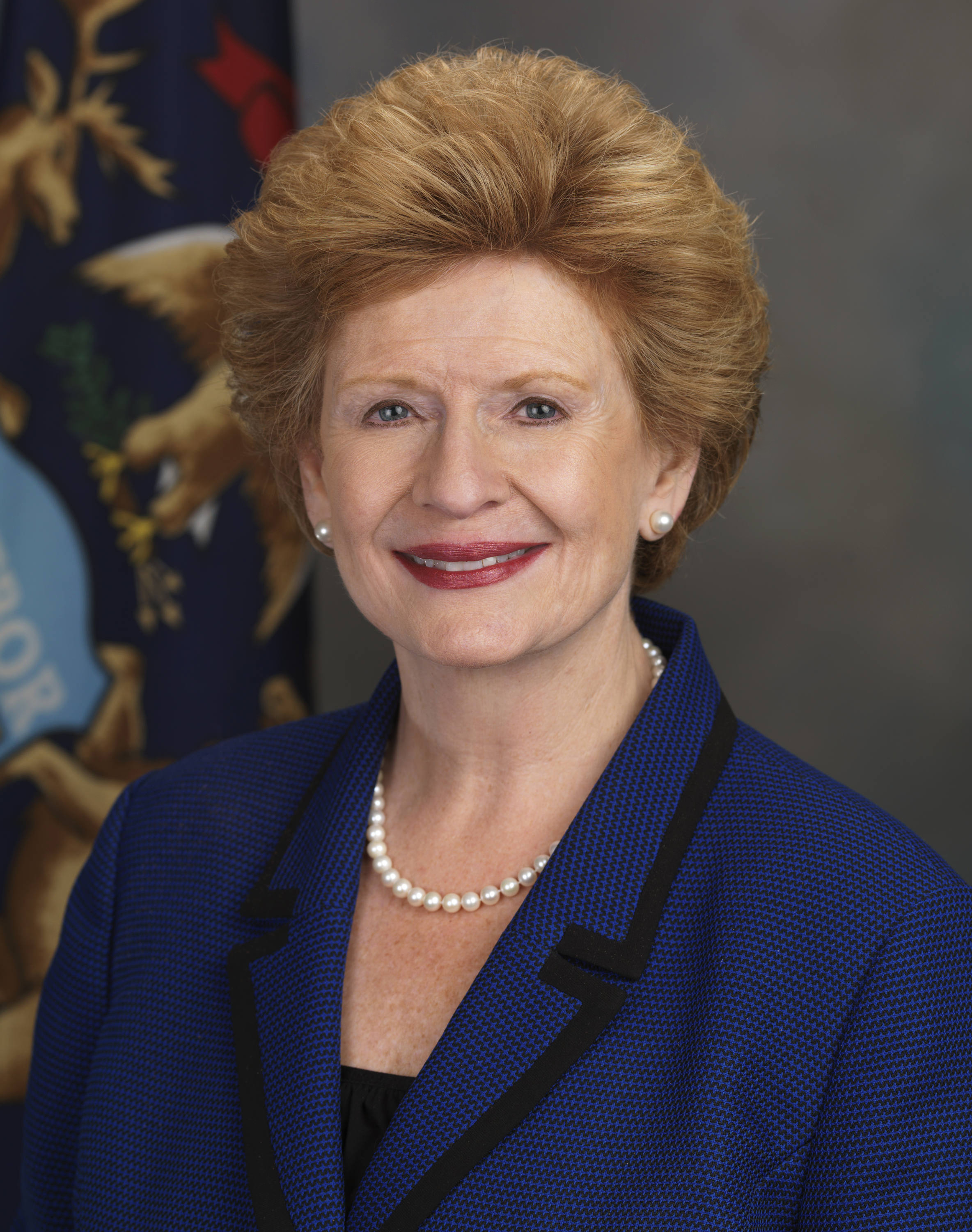
Stabenow during the 112th Congress

Before her final committee assignments, Stabenow also served on the Banking, Housing and Urban Affairs Committee and the Special Committee on Aging.

Stabenow is only the second person from Michigan to have served in both houses of the Michigan State Legislature and both houses of the United States Congress, the other being Thomas W. Ferry. She is also the first person to have served as a Michigan state legislator to be popularly elected to the U.S. Senate (until enactment of the 17th Amendment in 1913, U.S. senators were selected by state legislatures).

Stabenow became the third-ranking Democrat in the Senate on November 16, 2004, when she was elected secretary of the Democratic caucus. As caucus secretary, she assisted Senate Minority Leader Harry Reid in setting the Democratic agenda and priorities. Senator Dick Durbin was elected minority whip, the second-ranking Democratic spot. In November 2006, Reid announced that Stabenow would leave the caucus secretary position to succeed Hillary Clinton as chair of the Democratic Steering and Outreach Committee, charged with "engag[ing] Democratic Senators and community leaders across the country in an active dialogue".

After Tom Daschle, President Barack Obama's nominee for Secretary of Health and Human Services, withdrew from consideration, the National Organization for Women urged the president to appoint Stabenow, citing her focus on health care and her background as a social worker.

Stabenow became chair of the Senate Agriculture Committee in 2011, following the defeat of Blanche Lincoln. A controversial item during Stabenow's tenure was the renewal and reform of the 2012 U.S. Farm Bill. Reid reintroduced 2012's Senate Farm Bill in the 113th Congress in January 2013, saying that it was on his top priority list, and Stabenow voiced support for Reid's move, saying, "Majority Leader Reid has demonstrated that the Senate will once again make supporting our nation's agriculture economy while cutting spending a top priority."

On October 29, 2014, Stabenow introduced the Gun Lake Trust Land Reaffirmation Act (S. 1603; 113th Congress), a bill that would reaffirm the status of lands taken into trust by the Department of the Interior for the benefit of the Match-E-Be-Nash-She-Wish Band. The bill would clarify that the Match-E-Be-Nash-She-Wish Band's land trust could not be challenged in court under the Supreme Court decision Carcieri v. Salazar.

Stabenow was participating in the certification of the 2021 United States Electoral College vote count when Trump supporters attacked the United States Capitol. Along with other senators and staff, she was evacuated from the Senate chamber through a stairwell and taken to a safe location. She called the experience "heartbreaking" and "one of those things out of a movie" and said she had not felt that much fear since her time at the Capitol during the September 11 attacks. After the Capitol was secure, Congress returned to session to certify the election. Stabenow supported the certification. The day after the attack, Stabenow called for Trump's immediate removal from office through the invocation of the 25th Amendment or impeachment.

=== Committee assignments ===
- Committee on Agriculture, Nutrition, and Forestry (chair)
  - As chairperson, Senator Stabenow was an ex officio member of all subcommittees.
- Committee on the Budget
- Committee on Energy and Natural Resources
  - Subcommittee on Energy
  - Subcommittee on National Parks
  - Subcommittee on Water and Power
- Committee on Finance
  - Subcommittee on Health Care
  - Subcommittee on International Trade, Customs, and Global Competitiveness
  - Subcommittee on Energy, Natural Resources, and Infrastructure

=== Caucus memberships ===
- Afterschool Caucuses
- Congressional NextGen 9-1-1 Caucus
- Congressional Coalition on Adoption
- Rare Disease Caucus

== Political positions ==
=== Abortion ===
Stabenow supports reproductive rights and opposes the criminalization of abortion. She voted against "abortion trafficking" bills and tying HHS grants to a recipient's abortion policies.

=== Cannabis legalization ===
Stabenow supported Michigan Proposal 1 in 2018 to legalize cannabis for recreational use, although she would like to ensure law enforcement is involved so that the law is implemented correctly.

=== Food assistance ===
In 2013, Greg Kaufmann of The Nation wrote an article stating that Stabenow was prepared to cut $8 to $9 billion from the Supplemental Nutrition Assistance Program (SNAP). In a lengthy statement, Stabenow's office rejected these accusations, maintaining that she "strongly opposes any changes to food assistance that make cuts in benefits for people who need help putting food on the table" and that she "has been the number one defender against the House Republican proposal to cut food assistance by $40 billion." Kaufmann doubled down on his charges and challenged Stabenow's office's claims in detail.

In 2017, Stabenow fought to prevent the creation of additional work-requirement rules on SNAP recipients who were older or had smaller children and led a bipartisan effort to get the legislation passed.

=== Foreign policy ===
In October 2002, Stabenow was one of 23 senators who voted against authorization of the use of military force in Iraq.

In April 2019, Stabenow was one of 34 senators to sign a letter to President Donald Trump encouraging him "to listen to members of your own Administration and reverse a decision that will damage our national security and aggravate conditions inside Central America", asserting that Trump had "consistently expressed a flawed understanding of U.S. foreign assistance" since becoming president and that he was "personally undermining efforts to promote U.S. national security and economic prosperity" by preventing the use of Fiscal Year 2018 national security funding. The senators argued that foreign assistance to Central American countries created less migration to the U.S. by helping to improve conditions in those countries.

=== Flint water ===
Stabenow secured $100 million to repair and replace the water lines in Flint, Michigan, which were contaminating the drinking water with lead. She also pushed to include a program that would provide fresh fruits and vegetables to Flint children as part of the Farm Bill.

=== Economic issues ===
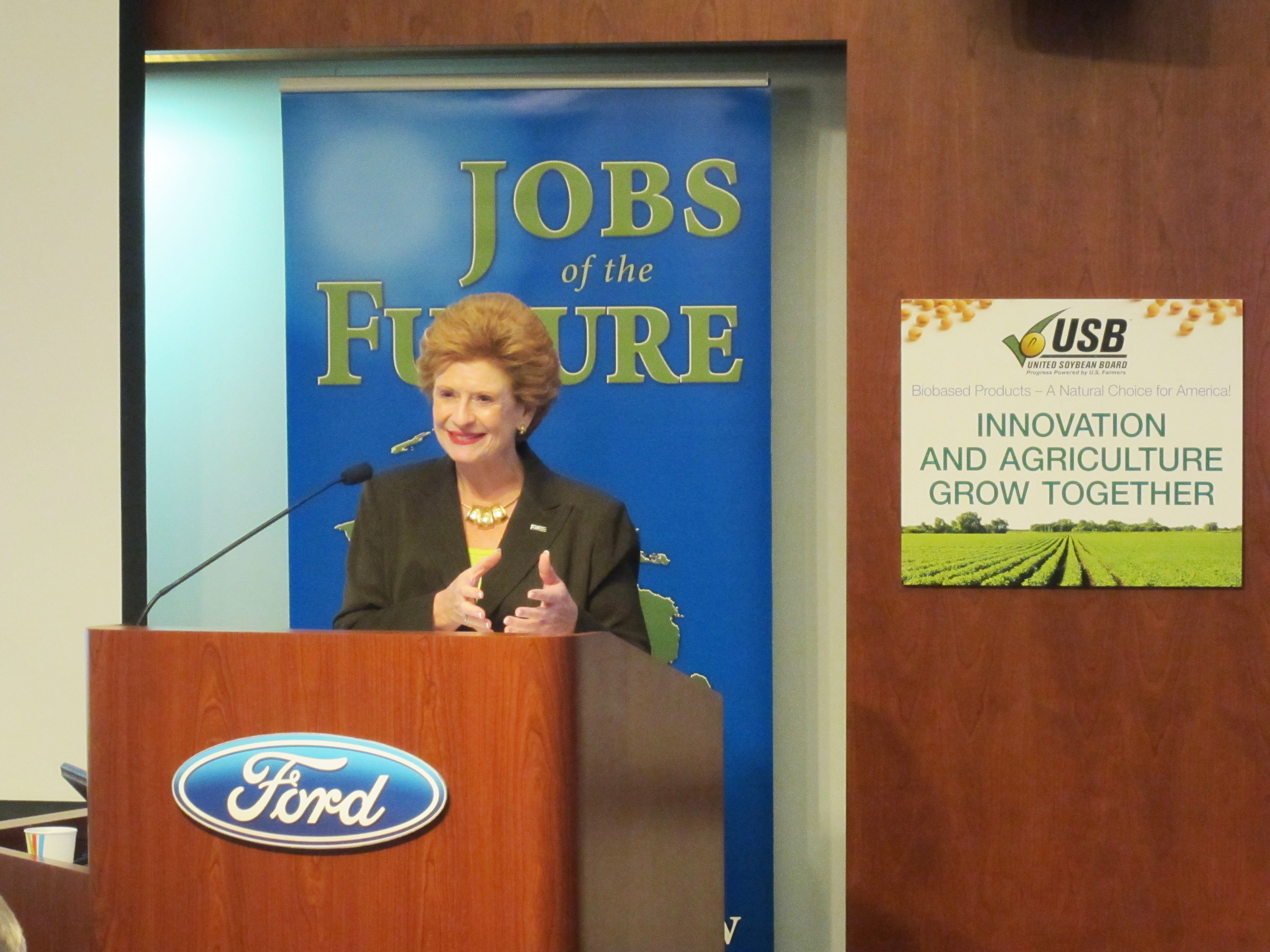
Senator Stabenow kicks off her Jobs of the Future Tour at Ford's biobased manufacturing lab in Dearborn.

Stabenow received low scores from free-market groups (Competitive Enterprise Institute, 2013, 0%; American Conservative Union, 2016, 0%; Americans for Prosperity, 2015–16, 0%) and high scores from fiscally liberal groups (Progressive Punch, 2015, 92%; NETWORK, A National Catholic Social Justice Lobby, 2012, 91%).

In 2007, Senator Stabenow joined the bipartisan (70-23) support of NOPEC in order to combat conspiratorial policies by foreign oil producers, extending Sherman Anti-Trust Act protection to include foreign cartels such as OPEC, and bring down US oil and gas costs for US consumers. In 2008, she voted against the Troubled Asset Relief Program proposed by President George W. Bush.

In 2009, Stabenow voted for President Barack Obama's $787 billion stimulus plan.

In 2010, she introduced the China Fair Trade Act, saying it would "prevent federal taxpayer dollars from being used to purchase Chinese products and services until they sign on to and abide by the WTO Agreement on Government Procurement." The bill would also require a report on Chinese industrial policies and require the Department of Energy to monitor the development of China's renewable energy sector.

In October 2011, Stabenow called for tax breaks for firms developing bio-based products, using crops like soybeans and corn to create prescriptions drugs, plastics, and soaps.

In August 2012, Stabenow expressed support for "strategic partnerships between farmers and industry" and for a recent Obama directive to boost federal purchases of bio-based products.

In 2015, she introduced the Stabenow-Portman Amendment (SA 1299) to address currency manipulation in the Trans-Pacific Partnership.

In 2015, the International Economic Development Council gave Stabenow the Congressional Leadership Award "for her significant contributions in the area of economic development." The IEDC cited her work on the 2014 Farm Bill, her sponsorship in 2013 of the New Skills for New Jobs Act, and her role in the federal bridge loan program."

In 2017, Stabenow introduced her American Jobs Agenda, which included two acts: the Make It In America Act and the Bring Jobs Home Act. The former, "would close loopholes in a 1933 law designed to give American companies priority when the federal government purchases goods." She said the act would require that the U.S. government: "buy American...If the federal agency says they need a waiver, they need to measure how many American jobs will be impacted by purchasing that product made overseas." The latter, "would create a tax cut for companies bringing jobs and business activities back to America from another country."

In April 2017, Stabenow was one of eight Democratic senators to sign a letter to Trump noting government-subsidized Chinese steel had been placed into the American market in recent years below cost and had hurt the domestic steel industry and the iron ore industry that fed it, calling on Trump to raise the steel issue with General Secretary of the Chinese Communist Party Xi Jinping in his meeting with him.

In May 2017, she and Senator Gary Peters announced a $210,000 EDA grant to the West Michigan Shoreline Regional Development Commission "to help spur economic development in West Michigan." The same month, she said that owing to a major change in farmers' margins since the 2014 Farm Bill, the farm safety net needed to be strengthened, especially for dairy farmers.

At a July 13, 2017, economics roundtable, she said that the "#1 request she gets in Michigan" is for "Professional technical jobs, building construction jobs—folks that can actually make things and do things." She said that Democrats can succeed in elections by "going to our core. We are the party that are willing to take risks to make things better...We believe in our core in an economy that actually works for everybody. That is how you grow America."

The Biotechnology Industry Organization thanked Stabenow in 2017 for supporting development of a "biobased economy," specifically for her introduction of the Renewable Chemicals Act of 2017, which would "allow taxpayers to claim a production tax credit of 15 cents per pound of biobased content of each renewable chemical produced during the taxable year."

On October 3, 2017, Stabenow and Peters introduced the Small Business Access to Capital Act, designed to "reauthorize and improve the State Small Business Credit Initiative (SSBCI) to help small businesses grow and create jobs." It built "on the successful SSBCI initiative that both lawmakers championed in the Small Business Jobs Act of 2010" and that "funds the Michigan Economic Development Corporation and other state-led lending programs that leverage private financing to help small businesses access the capital they need."

=== Immigration ===
Stabenow received high marks from groups supporting immigration (American Immigration Lawyers Association, 2013–14, 100%; National Hispanic Leadership Agenda, 2013–14, 100%) and low marks from groups opposed to immigration: Federation for American Immigration Reform, 2014, 0%; Numbers USA, 2017, 0%.

During the two-day January 2018 government shutdown, Stabenow was among 81 senators who effectively ended the shutdown by approving a three-week stopgap spending bill that "included reauthorizing the Children's Health Insurance Program for six years". This agreement was obtained after the Republican leadership "pledged to soon take up immigration legislation". She said they had "reached a bipartisan agreement that funds children's health insurance and moves us closer to a solution that provides long-term certainty for Michigan families and our national defense".

In January 2017, she opposed Trump's executive order temporarily limiting immigration from several Muslim majority countries, saying it: "is ruining America's reputation in the world, undermining our relationships with our most critical allies, and most heartbreakingly, destroying the lives of good and law-abiding people."

Stabenow voted against providing COVID-19 pandemic financial support to undocumented immigrants on February 4, 2021.

=== International relations ===
Stabenow supported Obama's Iran deal that sought to prevent Iran from developing nuclear weapons for 10 years and attempted to halt their uranium production.

=== Income inequality ===
Recounting a 2014 Senate hearing on income inequality, George Packer singled out Stabenow as the only committee member who pushed back on the idea that it was caused largely by the withdrawal from the workforce of middle-aged people who preferred to collect welfare. Stabenow "pointed out that almost all the voters she heard from in high-unemployment Michigan still wanted to work."

=== Government spending ===
She received low scores from low-spending advocates (Club for Growth, 2016, 8%; Council for Citizens against Government Waste, 2015, 0%; National Taxpayers Union, 2015, 9%).

=== Education ===
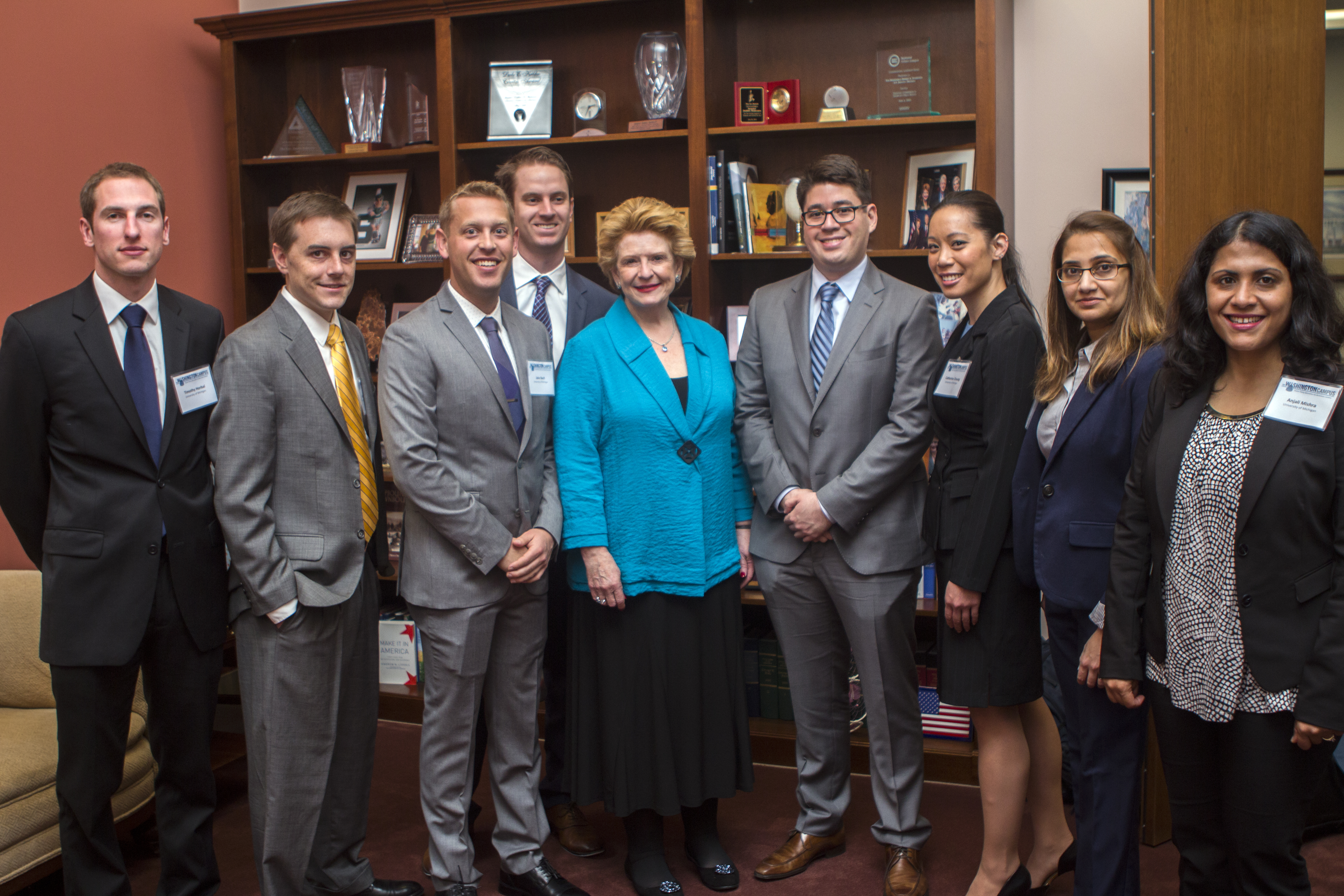
Stabenow meeting with students from the Ross School of Business in 2016

In 2011, Stabenow introduced the Reengaging Americans in Serious Education Act (RAISE UP Act), whereby the Department of Labor would fund programs to help "disconnected youth" get diplomas, degrees, and job certifications. In 2012, she co-sponsored a bill to freeze student loan interest rates at 3.4 percent and make additional funds available for Pell Grants.

In 2016, Stabenow and others introduced the Reducing Educational Debt Act, which she promoted with the #InTheRed hashtag.

She expressed "strong concerns" about Trump's nomination of Betsy DeVos as Secretary of Education, saying: "DeVos and her family have a long record of pushing policies that I believe have seriously undermined public education in Michigan and failed our children."

=== Gun policy ===
Stabenow supports gun control and supports a national assault weapons ban. After the Orlando nightclub shooting, Stabenow participated in the Chris Murphy gun control filibuster. One month later, she supported bills to ban people on the terrorist watchlist from buying guns and to expand background checks. Neither bill passed the Senate. Stabenow blamed the National Rifle Association of America (NRA) for the bills' failure to pass.

In 2017, following the Las Vegas shooting, Stabenow and Debbie Dingell introduced a law that would make it illegal for people convicted of misdemeanor stalking to buy guns.

Stabenow has an "A+" rating from the Brady Campaign to Prevent Gun Violence and an "F" rating from both the NRA and the Gun Owners of America.

=== Health care ===
Stabenow had helped open 10 community health centers in Detroit while in office.

She received high scores from Planned Parenthood (2017, 100%) and low scores from National Right to Life Committee, (2013, 0%).

In the 2000 campaign, she: "promised to make the pharmaceutical industry lower prescription drug prices, to maintain Social Security benefits and to give Medicare a new prescription drug plan." She pledged to "fight the pharmaceutical and insurance industries—the two industries that spend the most money lobbying federal officials" and accused the pharmaceutical industry of "making up to 20 percent net profit each year...on the backs of families, seniors and businesses." Her spokesperson said: "In the last election, I think the pharmaceutical industry spent more campaigning against her than any other candidate...She was enemy number one." Stabenow voted for the Patient Protection and Affordable Care Act in December 2009, and for the Health Care and Education Reconciliation Act of 2010. She also sponsored S. 2257, the Excellence in Mental Health Act.

On September 1, 2016, she said that approving money to combat Zika was a top congressional priority.

In August 2019, Stabenow was one of 19 senators to sign a letter to Treasury Secretary Steve Mnuchin and Health and Human Services Secretary Alex Azar requesting data from the Trump administration in order to help states and Congress understand the potential consequences in the event that the Texas v. United States Affordable Care Act (ACA) lawsuit prevailed in courts, writing that an overhaul of the present health care system would form "an enormous hole in the pocketbooks of the people we serve as well as wreck state budgets".

=== Housing ===
In April 2019, Stabenow was one of 41 senators to sign a bipartisan letter to the housing subcommittee praising the United States Department of Housing and Urban Development's Section 4 Capacity Building program as authorizing "HUD to partner with national nonprofit community development organizations to provide education, training, and financial support to local community development corporations (CDCs) across the country" and expressing disappointment that Trump's budget "has slated this program for elimination after decades of successful economic and community development." The senators wrote of their hope that the subcommittee would support continued funding for Section 4 in Fiscal Year 2020.

=== Defense ===
In December 2011, Stabenow voted in favor of the National Defense Authorization Act for Fiscal Year 2012. The bill included highly controversial provisions, drafted by Senators Carl Levin and John McCain in closed session, that would allow for the indefinite military detention without trial of American citizens deemed potential terrorists and enemies of the state.

=== Environment ===
==== Climate change ====
On August 10, 2009, Stabenow was reported by The Detroit News as saying, "Global warming creates volatility. I feel it when I'm flying. The storms are more volatile. We are paying the price in more hurricanes and tornadoes." She has, however, opposed regulation of greenhouse gases, enhanced fuel efficiency standards in California, and greenhouse gas emission reporting standards.

Stabenow voted for the SBIR/STTR Reauthorization Act of 2011 (S.493). In March 2011, ThinkProgress accused her of joining "the pro-polluter frenzy sweeping the U.S. Senate," saying that the legislation was: "being used as a vehicle for senators who wish to prevent regulation of greenhouse pollution from oil refineries, coal-fired power plants, heavy industry, and other major emitters. Stabenow has added her amendment to three others intended to hamstring the Environmental Protection Agency on behalf of carbon polluters."

Stabenow's proposed amendment to keep the EPA from regulating greenhouse gas emissions for two years also drew criticism. The amendment would have given “coal-fired power plants, oil refineries and other industrial sources a two year exemption” from rules requiring them to report greenhouse gas emissions. She defended her position by calling her amendment: "a common-sense approach that allows protections from carbon pollution, determined by scientists and public health experts, to continue being developed while providing businesses the support and incentives they need as they reduce pollution, generate new clean energy technologies and create jobs."

In February 2019, in response to reports of the EPA intending to decide against setting drinking water limits for perfluorooctane sulfonic acid (PFOS) and perfluorooctanoic acid (PFOA) as part of an upcoming national strategy to manage the chemicals, Stabenow was one of 20 senators to sign a letter to Acting EPA Administrator Andrew R. Wheeler calling on the agency: "to develop enforceable federal drinking water standards for PFOA and PFOS, as well as institute immediate actions to protect the public from contamination from additional per- and polyfluoroalkyl substances (PFAS)."

==== Drilling in the Great Lakes ====
In 2010, Stabenow called for a total ban on drilling in the Great Lakes. Critics noted that "a U.S. federal ban on all oil and natural gas offshore drilling in the Great Lakes" had already "been in place since 2005" and that Canada banned offshore oil drilling but had "roughly 500 offshore gas wells in Lake Erie" plus 23 "slant wells" that "drill for oil on shore but extend under Lake Erie." In 2015, Stabenow and Gary Peters introduced the Pipeline Improvement and Preventing Spills Act "to ban shipping of crude oil by vessel on the Great Lakes and require a comprehensive, top-to-bottom review of hazardous pipelines in the region."

In May 2017, Stabenow expressed support for the bipartisan effort to retain funding for The Great Lakes Restoration Initiative.

In September 2016, Stabenow and Peters led an effort to link an aid package for the Flint water crisis to flood relief funds for Louisiana.

==== Canadian waste disposal ====
On August 31, 2006, Stabenow, Senator Carl Levin and Representative John Dingell announced an agreement that would completely cease Ontario's dumping of solid waste in Michigan within four years. This had been an issue in Michigan for the past several years. Stabenow had previously introduced legislation in the Senate intended to reduce the dumping of Canadian trash in Michigan. In July 2006, the Senate unanimously passed a law sponsored by Stabenow requiring the payment of a $420 inspection fee for every truckload of Canadian trash brought into Michigan.

=== Fairness doctrine ===
Asked in 2009 by Bill Press whether she would support a return of the Fairness Doctrine, under which the federal government enforced an ideological "balance" on the airwaves, Stabenow said yes: "I absolutely think it's time to be bringing accountability to the airwaves." Asked whether she would push for Senate hearings on the subject, she said, "I have already had some discussions with colleagues and, you know, I feel like that's gonna happen. Yep." It has been noted that Stabenow's then husband was Tom Athans, an executive in left-wing radio (Air America, Democracy Radio), whose career would have benefited from such legislation.

Stabenow is probably the most prominent politician to seriously support a new Fairness Doctrine.

=== GMOs ===
Stabenow, as Senate Agriculture Committee Chair, added an amendment to the 2013–14 Farm Bill that prohibited state laws requiring GMO labeling for foods. She has been criticized because this amendment aided Monsanto and other agribusinesses, which donated over three-quarters of a million dollars to her campaign during that election cycle. In 2016, she was again criticized for her role in the passage of a law that overruled state laws mandating GMO labeling.

=== Trump nominations ===
In January 2017, Stabenow opposed Trump's nomination of Jeff Sessions as Attorney General: "Because of his record on civil rights and his votes against anti-domestic violence legislation, I cannot support him to be our nation's highest law enforcement officer...Families in Michigan and across the country deserve an attorney general who will enforce the nation's laws fairly and equally."

That March, she opposed Trump's nomination of Neil Gorsuch to the Supreme Court: "After reviewing Judge Gorsuch's rulings, it is clear that he has a long record of siding with special interests and institutions instead of hard-working Americans. And, therefore, in my judgment, he does not meet this standard of balance and impartiality."

In July 2018, citing his past rulings on presidential powers, she opposed the nomination of Brett Kavanaugh, furthermore stating that the FBI should perform a background check regarding multiple allegations of sexual assault.

She similarly opposed Trump's 2020 nomination of Amy Coney Barrett, stating: "It's very clear from her writings, multiple writings, that she will be the vote that takes away health care for millions of Americans, including 130 million people and counting with pre-existing conditions..." She voted against the nomination while wearing a face mask depicting Barrett's predecessor Ruth Bader Ginsburg.

=== Retirement ===
On January 5, 2023, Stabenow announced her intention to retire from the Senate. Her announcement cited a desire to "pass the torch" to Michigan's next generation of leadership: "I have always believed it's not enough to be the first unless there is a second and a third". She also noted time with family as a motivation for her retirement. The end of Stabenow's term in the Senate marked 50 years of her holding elected office. In February 2023, Michigan Representative Elissa Slotkin launched a campaign to succeed Stabenow in the Senate, and Slotkin went on to win the general election in November 2024.

== Awards and honors ==
In February 2023, a portrait of Stabenow by Michigan artist Joshua Adam Risner was unveiled in the Russell Senate Office Building. Congressional committee chairs traditionally receive portraits in their committee rooms. Stabenow's portrait came due to her years as chair of the Senate Committee on Agriculture, Nutrition, and Forestry. It was commissioned by the Historical Society of Michigan.

On October 3, 2024, Washington Park in Lansing, Michigan was renamed Debbie Stabenow Park in her honor.

== Personal life ==
Stabenow is a member of the United Methodist Church.

Stabenow was first married to Dennis Stabenow. The couple had two children and divorced in 1990.

In 2003, Stabenow married Tom Athans, co-founder of Democracy Radio and former executive vice president of Air America. She has a stepdaughter from this marriage. They divorced in 2010.

Stabenow had a cameo appearance in the 2016 film Batman v Superman: Dawn of Justice as governor of the unspecified state in which Metropolis is located. She was invited to appear because the scene was filmed in Michigan, and for her support for film-industry incentives.

In 2024, Stabenow declined to run for a fifth Senate term, citing a wish to spend more time with her family, including her 96-year-old mother.

== Electoral history ==
2000 United States Senate election in Michigan
Party	Candidate	Votes	%	±%
Democratic	Debbie Stabenow	2,061,952	49.47%	
Republican	Spencer Abraham (incumbent)	1,994,693	47.86%	
Green	Matthew Abel	37,542	0.90%	
Libertarian	Michael Corliss	29,966	0.72%	
Reform	Mark Forton	26,274	0.63%	
Constitution	John Mangopoulos	11,628	0.28%	
Natural Law	William Quarton	5,630	0.14%	
Majority		67,259	1.61%	
Turnout		4,165,685		
Democratic gain from Republican		Swing	−4.02%	

2006 United States Senate election in Michigan
Party	Candidate	Votes	%	±%
Democratic	Debbie Stabenow (incumbent)	2,151,278	56.9%	+7.4%
Republican	Michael Bouchard	1,559,597	41.3%	−6.6%
Libertarian	Leonard Schwartz	27,012	0.7%	0%
Green	David Sole	23,890	0.6%	−0.3%
Constitution	Dennis FitzSimons	18,341	0.5%	+0.2
Majority		591,681	15.6%	
Turnout		3,780,142		
Democratic hold		Swing	7%	

2012 United States Senate election in Michigan
Party	Candidate	Votes	%	±%
Democratic	Debbie Stabenow (incumbent)	2,735,826	58.8%	+1.9%
Republican	Pete Hoekstra	1,767,386	38.0%	−3.3%
Libertarian	Scotty Boman	84,480	1.8%	+1.1%
Green	Harley Mikkelson	27,890	0.6%	−
Constitution	Richard Matkin	26,038	0.6%	+0.1%
Natural Law	John Litle	11,229	0.2%	+0.1%
Write-in		69	0.0%	-
Majority		968,440	20.8%	
Turnout		4,652,918		
Democratic hold		Swing	2%	

2018 United States Senate election in Michigan
Party	Candidate	Votes	%	±%
Democratic	Debbie Stabenow (incumbent)	2,214,478	52.3%	−6.5%
Republican	John E. James	1,938,818	45.8%	+7.8%
Green	Marcia Squier	40,204	0.9%	+0.3%
Constitution	George Huffman		0.6%	+0.6%
Natural Law	John Wilhelm	16,502	0.2%	+0.2%
Majority		275,660	6.50%	−14.3%
Turnout		4,237,253		
Democratic hold		Swing	6%	

== See also ==
- Women in the United States House of Representatives
- Women in the United States Senate

== Notes ==
Party political offices
Preceded by Olivia Maynard	Democratic nominee for Lieutenant Governor of Michigan; 1994	Succeeded by Jim Agee
Preceded by Bob Carr	Democratic nominee for U.S. Senator from Michigan (Class 1); 2000, 2006, 2012, 2018	Succeeded by Elissa Slotkin
Preceded by Barbara Mikulski	Secretary of the Senate Democratic Conference; 2005–2007	Succeeded by Patty Murray
Preceded by Hillary Clinton	Chair of the Senate Democratic Steering and Outreach Committee; 2007–2011	Succeeded by Mark Begich
New office	Vice Chair of the Senate Democratic Policy Committee; 2011–2017	Succeeded by Joe Manchin
Preceded by Chuck Schumer	Chair of the Senate Democratic Policy and Communications Committee; 2017–2025	Succeeded by Amy Klobuchar as Chair of the Senate Democratic Steering and Policy Committee
Preceded by Chuck Schumer	Chair of the Senate Democratic Policy and Communications Committee; 2017–2025	Succeeded by Cory Booker as Chair of the Senate Democratic Strategic Communications Committee
U.S. House of Representatives
Preceded by Dick Chrysler	Member of the U.S. House of Representatives from Michigan's 8th congressional district 1997–2001	Succeeded by Mike Rogers
U.S. Senate
Preceded by Spencer Abraham	U.S. Senator (Class 1) from Michigan; 2001–2025; Served alongside: Carl Levin, Gary Peters	Succeeded by Elissa Slotkin
Preceded by Blanche Lincoln	Chair of the Senate Agriculture Committee; 2011–2015	Succeeded by Pat Roberts
Preceded by Thad Cochran	Ranking Member of the Senate Agriculture Committee; 2015–2021	Succeeded by John Boozman
Preceded by Pat Roberts	Chair of the Senate Agriculture Committee; 2021–2025	Succeeded by John Boozman
U.S. order of precedence (ceremonial)
Preceded by Sam Nunn as Former U.S. Senator	Order of precedence of the United States as Former U.S. Senator	Succeeded by Barbara Boxer as Former U.S. Senator
