= Tom Athans =

American media executive

- Athans in 2010
- Born: 1961 (age 64–65); Detroit, Michigan, U.S.
- Education: Wayne State University
- Spouse: Debbie Stabenow (2003–2010)

Tom Athans (born 1961) is an American media executive. He is the co-founder and former CEO of Democracy Radio, an organization that created and produced progressive talk radio shows that included The Ed Schultz Show and The Stephanie Miller Show. After his tenure at Democracy Radio, he joined Air America Radio as Executive Vice President for Programming. Athans was married to U.S. Senator Debbie Stabenow from 2003 to 2010.

== Early life and career ==
Athans, of Greek descent, was born in Detroit, Michigan. He was a congressional aide in the U.S. House of Representatives and the United States Senate. Previous to his tenure as a staffer in Congress, he was elected to local office and served two terms as a Councilman and President of the Village Council in Oxford, Michigan. Athans is also a veteran of the United States Air Force and the Michigan Air National Guard.

== Career ==
In 2002, Athans and radio industry veteran Paul Fiddick founded Democracy Radio, an organization dedicated to creating political balance on America's commercial radio airwaves. Their concept was to develop, fund and incubate progressive oriented talk programming and enlist radio networks to market the programs to stations around the country. Democracy Radio developed and produced talk shows that launched the national careers of Ed Schultz and Stephanie Miller, among others.

On June 8, 2005, Democracy Radio sold its stake in The Ed Schultz Show to a new company headed by veteran radio executive Randy Michaels, the former CEO of Clear Channel Radio. In November 2005, Democracy Radio's partner in The Stephanie Miller Show, WYD Media headed by radio industry veteran Ron Hartenbaum, purchased Democracy Radio's shares and assumed sole ownership of the venture.

On November 4, 2005, Athans stepped down as CEO of Democracy Radio.

After stepping down from Democracy Radio, Athans became Executive Vice-President of Air America, a Progressive talk radio network. Athans was in charge of new program development to expand Air America's programming lineup. He also headed Air America's Washington, D.C. corporate office.

After Air America underwent bankruptcy procedures in late 2006, Athans founded TalkUSA Radio, a radio production company. Talk USA launched The Leslie Marshall Show and Washington Monthly on the Radio into national syndication.

Athans, an occasional contributor to The Huffington Post, resides in Saint Clair Shores, Michigan and is currently Chief Development Officer of NRM Streamcast, a digital entertainment network based in Michigan.

== Legal issues ==
In February 2008, Athans was detained in Troy, Michigan, as part of a prostitution sting and admitted to paying for a sex act. At the time, he was married to U.S. Senator Debbie Stabenow (D-Michigan). Athans was not charged, but was ticketed for driving with a suspended driver license. In April, Athans made a public statement, "No words can fully express how sorry I am. At the time this incident occurred, I took responsibility for my actions and fully cooperated with law enforcement. My family and I are dealing with this matter in a personal and private way."
