= KSNB =

KSNB may refer to:

- KSNB (FM), a radio station (91.5 FM) licensed to Norton, Kansas, United States
- KSNB-TV, a television station (channel 24, virtual 4) licensed to York, Nebraska, United States
- KTNF, a radio station (950 AM) licensed to St. Louis Park, Minnesota, United States, which used the call sign KSNB from January 2004 to November 2004
