= KJJO =

KJJO may refer to:

- KTNF, a radio station (950 AM) licensed to St. Louis Park, Minnesota, United States, which used the call sign KJJO from January 1981 to February 1989 and from March 1990 to December 1995
- KZJK, a radio station (104.1 FM) licensed to St. Louis Park, Minnesota, United States, which used the call sign KJJO or KJJO-FM from January 1981 to May 1995
