= Brad Friedman =

American activist

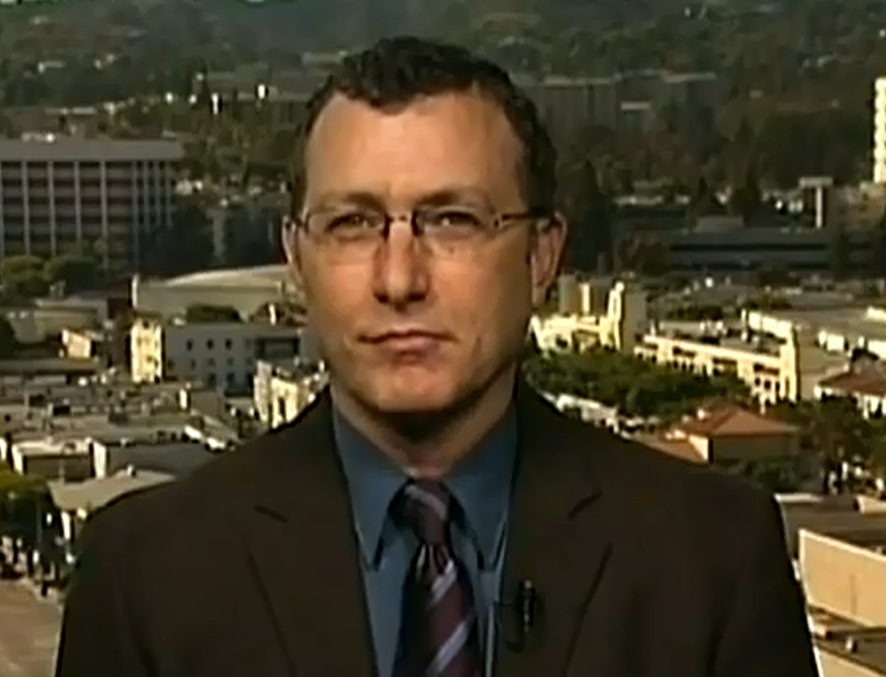
- Friedman 2012
- Born: Bradley Louis Friedman; July 19, 1966 (age 60)
- Education: Interlochen Center for the Arts; New York University (BFA); Tisch School of the Arts (BFA)
- Occupations: Blogger, journalist, actor, radio broadcaster, director, and software programmer

Bradley Louis Friedman (born July 19, 1966) is an American blogger, journalist, actor, radio broadcaster, director and software programmer, most known for his criticism of election integrity issues in the United States. Friedman graduated from Interlochen Arts Academy in 1983 and received a BFA from New York University's (NYU) Tisch School of the Arts in 1988.

== The BRAD BLOG ==
Friedman's blog covers voting rights and election integrity issues in the US, and a number of other subjects related to media reform and political corruption from a progressive standpoint.

His blog site is generally critical of Premier Election Solutions (formerly Diebold Election Systems), ES&S, Sequoia Voting Systems and electronic voting in general.

Based on his advocacy at The BRAD BLOG and in other publications, he was invited to testify at the Election Assistance Commission's Voting Advocate Roundtable Discussion. Friedman is a noted advocate of a return to paper balloting and of the role of bloggers as journalists. He has been described in The New York Times as "perhaps the most dogged critic of electronic voting machine technology in the blogosphere".

== Other work ==
Friedman is the host of the internationally syndicated daily radio show, The BradCast produced at Pacifica Radio's Los Angeles affiliate station KPFK 90.7FM, and the long time regular guest host of the nationally syndicated Mike Malloy Show. This show is also aired on AM950 Minnesota.

He is featured in numerous documentary films, interviewed as an investigative journalist, and expert in issues of election integrity and voting systems. Among the films in which he appears: Phil Donahue & Ellen Spiro's Body of War, David Earnhardt's Uncounted: The New Math of American Elections, Dorothy Fadiman's Stealing America: Vote by Vote and Patty Sharaf's Murder, Spies & Voting Lies: The Clint Curtis Story.

In July 2006, Hustler magazine featured an article in which Friedman discussed the alleged suicide of Raymond Lemme, an investigator tracking down claims of vote-rigging by Congressman Tom Feeney, as alleged by Florida software programmer Clint Curtis in a story Friedman broke in late 2004 and has covered in great detail ever since.

Friedman reported on suspicions that the 2008 New Hampshire Democratic primary was rigged.

He has also extensively covered the case of Ann Coulter's voter fraud issues in Florida.

In 2008 Friedman reported critically on the FBI investigation into the suspected involvement of Bruce Ivins in the 2001 anthrax attacks.

An exclusive interview Friedman conducted with Ohio Secretary of State Jennifer Brunner, just prior to the 2008 general election, was published in two parts; one part in Computerworld, noted Brunner's memorable thought upon reviewing the "awful" findings of the state's report on the security of electronic voting systems in Ohio ("I thought I was going to throw up"), and the other in Alternet quoting the Secretary as stating "we will be ready" for the 2008 election.

Friedman contributed a chapter on Nevada's "illegally certified" electronic voting machines to Loser Take All, a collection of essays on America's voting system, published by Ig Publishing in 2008, as edited by NYU media professor, author and outspoken election integrity advocate Mark Crispin Miller. The investigative essay, titled "The Selling of the Touch-Screen 'Paper-Trail': From Nevada to the EAC" was co-authored with Michael Richardson, and described by Miller in the book's introduction as "the harrowing pre-history of the 2004 election in Nevada, whose voting system had long since been hijacked by Secretary of State Dean Heller".

Ohio Congressman Dennis Kucinich's "35 Articles of Impeachment Against George W. Bush" refers to several reports by Friedman in its published footnotes for Article XXIX, "Conspiracy to Violate the Voting Rights Act of 1965". Friedman was tapped by Kucinich as one of several experts who helped to compile two (Article 28, "Tampering with Free and Fair Elections" and Article 29, "Conspiracy to Violate the Voting Rights Act of 1965") of the 35 articles of impeachment as introduced in Congress in 2008.

In February 2011, Friedman and his family were discovered to have been named as targets of a proposed $12 million smear campaign being created for the U.S. Chamber of Commerce by three government-contracted cyber intelligence firms. In an interview with David Dayen at Firedoglake, Friedman decried the plot, called it a "new era of dirty tricks" and said "We’re fighting against how our own tax dollars are being spent against us."

== Recognition ==
Buffalo's independent newspaper The Beast describes him as "perhaps the most diligent and unassailable election integrity advocate in America."

He is the creator and publisher of The BRAD BLOG, which the Los Angeles Times has described as California's "most persistent blogger-watchdog on the dangers of voting technology".

"If you want to learn about the state of our election process, I urge you to visit BradBlog.com. Brad Friedman has worked doggedly on this issue, amassing tons of valuable news and information on this subject." - Catherine Crier, Crier Live, Court TV, July 11, 2006. Friedman would later appear along with Robert F. Kennedy Jr. live on Crier's program, on July 20, 2006, to discuss concerns about voting systems to be used in that year's upcoming general election.

A November 2008 interview by BuzzFlash.com describes Friedman as a "Champion of Fair Elections and Challenger of Election Theft," and notes "Brad has been unrelenting in documenting the details of the dark side of our voting system."

The Chicago Sun-Times' Beacon News profiled Friedman in April 2008.

McClatchy-owned Kansas City Star cited Friedman's "rare" radio interview with Missouri Sec. of State Robin Carnahan in May 2008, concerning the controversial issue of voter Photo ID restrictions at polling places in the state, as a bill to require it in Missouri was being debated in the state legislature. The paper describes Friedman as a "well-known voting machine critic and blogger".

Friedman is a 2010 Project Censored award winner for "Excellence in Investigative Journalism" in recognition of his coverage of "The Mysterious Death of Mike Connell—Karl Rove’s Election Thief". He also contributed a chapter to the organization's Censored 2010: The Top 25 Censored Stories of 2008-09 book, on voting problems and fraud in the 2008 Elections.

On September 30, 2010, CNN's Senior National Editor Dave Schecter wrote "One of the squeakiest wheels on the subject of voting is Brad Friedman, of 'The Brad Blog'" and cited his coverage of Pac-Man being hacked onto an electronic voting system made by Sequoia Voting Systems.
