= Buyer's Remorse =

Buyer's Remorse may refer to:

- Buyer's remorse, the sense of regret after making a purchase
- Buyer's Remorse (book), 2016 book by Bill Press

== Television ==
- "Buyer's Remorse", The Mayor season 2, episode 14 (2008)
- "Buyer's Remorse", The Mayor season 1, episode 3 (2017)
- "Buyer's Remorse", The Night Agent season 2, episode 10 (2025)
