= Brother Wease =

American radio personality

- Born: Alan Levin; Rochester, New York, U.S.
- Occupation: Radio personality
- Years active: 1985–2025

Brother Wease is the on-air name of Alan Levin, a retired radio personality from Rochester, New York.

== Radio career ==
Levin began his on-air career as a late evening host on 96.5 WCMF-FM in 1985. He soon moved to the morning show using the name "Brother Wease." His show, "The Brother Wease Morning Circus," was among the top-rated programs in the Rochester market. He also hosted a Saturday music show entitled "Radio Free Wease."

From March through September 2004, Wease hosted both his WCMF music show and a similar program on WBUF, WCMF's Buffalo sister station in the CBS station group, which was then using a hot talk radio format. He was also heard on weekends on New York City's WNEW-FM during its period as a hot talk station. In December 2006, he hosted a three-hour music show on XM Satellite Radio's Virus channel.

BJ Shea, Gregg Hughes, and syndicated talk radio host Stephanie Miller (then known as "Sister Sleaze") have also worked with Brother Wease.

Levin's run at WCMF ended in early 2008 when his contract expired, as the station was being transferred from the CBS radio group to Entercom Communications. Levin and officials from station owner Entercom attempted to negotiate a new contract but were unable to reach terms. His co-hosts remained and took over the show, which was renamed "The Break Room."

Shortly after leaving WCMF, Levin took a job as a sales executive at Clear Channel Communications. He could not go on the air because of a non-compete clause in his previous contract. He returned to the airwaves on November 17, 2008, on WFXF "95.1 The Fox" with a new supporting cast that included co-host Lilly Hisenaj (formerly of XM's Ron & Fez show), Rochester stand-up comic Jamie Lissow, and executive morning show producer Anthony Caiazzo. The program was called "The Wease Show." The station later changed formats and call signs, becoming WQBW and then WAIO. Levin hosted mornings until September 2023, when he moved to a late-morning slot.

In 2021, Levin was inducted into the National Radio Hall of Fame in the Longstanding Network/Syndication (20 years or more) category. He was inducted into the Rochester Music Hall of Fame in 2023.

On September 4, 2025, Levin told listeners that it would be his final show, an hour before iHeartMedia flipped WAIO from a talk format to rock. He said the company had offered him other opportunities to stay on the air, including a weekend morning music show and a two-hour Sunday night talk program on sister station WHAM, but that he did not want to end his career that way. He retired at the age of 78 and announced plans to launch a podcast with his son Jake in January 2026.

=== Lawsuits ===
Levin was sued twice by former co-workers in the late 1990s over lewd and sexually derogatory comments he made about them on the air. Cindy Pierce, a former co-host, said his remarks about her forced her off the air. Account executive Jodi Strada claimed he humiliated her with on-air sexual references. Both suits were settled out of court.

== Personal life ==
Levin took his stage name from his school nickname, "Weasel." He is known for his openness with listeners, including sharing much of his personal life. He is a veteran who completed three tours of duty in Vietnam.

Levin served as an emcee for Woodstock '94 and Woodstock 1999. In 1997, he founded the Wease Cares Children's Fund to raise money for children in need.

=== Cancer ===
Levin announced on his February 2, 2005, show that he had been diagnosed with nasopharyngeal carcinoma, a rare form of sinus cancer. He underwent seven weeks of radiation treatment at Memorial Sloan-Kettering Cancer Center in New York City, broadcasting from a makeshift studio in his apartment for as long as he was physically able.

He never missed a show, though on some days he could broadcast for only a few minutes. During his treatment, WCMF established "Kick Cancer's Ass," a campaign that raised nearly $100,000 for children with cancer. He returned to Rochester following his treatment and learned in August 2005 that it had been successful.
