= Stealing America: Vote by Vote =

- Directed by: Dorothy Fadiman
- Produced by: Mitchell Block, James Fadiman, Carla Henry, Bruce O'Dell
- Narrated by: Peter Coyote
- Music by: Laurence Rosenthal
- Release date: August 1, 2008
- Running time: 90 minutes
- Country: United States
- Language: English

Stealing America: Vote by Vote is a 2008 documentary film directed by Dorothy Fadiman, which examines the state of election manipulation in the United States. The film focuses on voter disfranchisement, the use of electronic voting machines, and voting anomalies such as uncounted ballots, inaccurate final vote tallies, and vote-switching.

The film is narrated by Peter Coyote and features film clips and interviews, including those from Greg Palast, Brad Friedman, Ion Sancho, Pete McCloskey, Paul Craig Roberts, Harvey Wasserman, Bob Hagan, Charles Traylor, Bob Fitrakis, Charles Lewis, Avi Rubin, John Zogby, Clint Curtis, and former employees from Diebold.

The San Francisco Bay Guardian wrote, "The scariest movie of 2008 so far is, quite possibly, Dorothy Fadiman's 'Stealing America: Vote by Vote,' a stomach-turning look at election irregularities that stretch back as far as 1996, with a special emphasis on the über-fishy goings-on in Ohio circa 2004." The Seattle Times wrote, "The horror of 'Stealing America' arises from the evidence supporting Fadiman's suggestion that the '04 election was rigged. Through a combination of first-person accounts (including Democratic State Sen. Bob Hagan of Ohio, who also witnessed vote-switching firsthand), extensive research and revealing clips from multiple TV news sources, Fadiman investigates the many 'glitches' in voting procedures that result in literally millions of votes being potentially 'lost, miscounted or even deleted."

Entertainment Weekly wrote of the film that it was, "tersely sobering documentary. Its provocative thesis is that the age of electronic voting machines has actually made election fraud easier. If that sounds like a conspiracy theory, it is. But Stealing America: Vote by Vote mounts its case with hardheaded numerical logic."
