= 2000 United States Senate election in Michigan =

- November 7, 2000
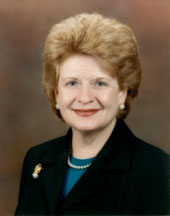

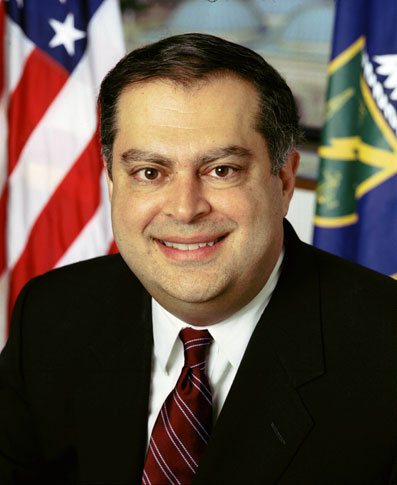
Nominee	Debbie Stabenow	Spencer Abraham
Party	Democratic	Republican
Popular vote	2,061,952	1,994,693
Percentage	49.47%	47.86%
- Stabenow: 40–50% 50–60% 60–70% Abraham: 40–50% 50–60% 60–70% 70–80%
U.S. senator before election
Spencer Abraham
Republican
Elected U.S. Senator
Debbie Stabenow
Democratic

The 2000 United States Senate election in Michigan was held on November 7, 2000. Republican incumbent Spencer Abraham ran for re-election to a second term but was narrowly defeated by his Democratic congresswoman Debbie Stabenow, who became the first woman to represent Michigan in the United States Senate. With a 1.6 percent popular vote margin, this was the second-closest race of the 2000 Senate elections, behind only the Washington election.

Following his defeat, Abraham was appointed United States energy secretary by George W. Bush and served from 2001 to 2005.

== General election ==
=== Candidates ===
- Matthew R. Abel (Green)
- Spencer Abraham, incumbent U.S. senator since 1995 (Republican)
- Michael Corliss (Libertarian)
- Mark Forton (Reform)
- John Mangopoulos (Constitution)
- William Quarton (Natural Law)
- Debbie Stabenow, U.S. representative from East Lansing (Democratic)

=== Campaign ===
Abraham, who was first elected in the 1994 Republican Revolution despite never running for public office before, was considered vulnerable by the Democratic Senatorial Campaign Committee. Major issues in the campaign included prescription drugs for the elderly. By September 4, Abraham still had failed to reach 50% in polls despite having spent over $6 million on television ads. In mid-October, he came back and reached 50% and 49% in two polls respectively. Abraham's campaign established a negative web site with the URL LiberalDebbie.com which parodied the logo for Little Debbie snack cakes. McKee Foods, the maker of Little Debbie cakes objected to the trademark infringement and the Abraham campaign included a disclaimer stating that McKee Foods does not endorse Abraham.

=== Debates ===
- Complete video of debate, October 22, 2000

=== Polling ===
Poll source	Date(s)	Sample size	Margin of error	Spencer Abraham (R)	Debbie Stabenow (D)	Other / undecided (Note: Calculated by taking the difference of 100% and all other candidates combined.)
Zogby Analytics	November 5, 2000	593	—	47%	51%	2%
Rasmussen Reports	November 4, 2000	787	—	48%	42%	10%
SurveyUSA	November 4, 2000	600	—	50%	44%	6%
Harris Insights & Analytics	November 3, 2000	6,748	—	48%	48%	4%
EPIC-MRA	November 2, 2000	500	—	47%	42%	11%
Zogby Analytics	November 2, 2000	600	—	45%	45%	10%
Mitchell Research & Communications	November 1, 2000	800	—	41%	38%	21%
Research 2000	November 1, 2000	602	—	39%	44%	17%
Mitchell Research & Communications	October 31, 2000	800	—	40%	38%	22%
Zogby Analytics	October 30, 2000	600	—	39%	48%	13%
Rasmussen Reports	October 29, 2000	956	—	45%	44%	11%
SurveyUSA	October 29, 2000	600	—	49%	47%	4%
Zogby Analytics	October 27, 2000	600	—	42%	44%	14%
Marketing Resource Group (MRG)	October 25, 2000	500	—	49%	41%	10%
EPIC-MRA	October 24, 2000	500	—	41%	41%	18%
Mitchell Research & Communications	October 24, 2000	800	—	39%	36%	25%
EPIC-MRA	October 18, 2000	500	—	47%	40%	13%
Rasmussen Reports	October 18, 2000	626	—	53%	34%	13%

=== Results ===
Stabenow won by just over 67,000 votes. She won the Democratic stronghold of Wayne County by a large margin and performed well in Ingham County and Ann Arbor. Abraham conceded at 4:00 a.m. the next morning and called Stabenow to congratulate her. As a result of the historic election, Stabenow became the first woman to represent Michigan in the United States Senate.

General election results
Party	Candidate	Votes	%
Democratic	Debbie Stabenow	2,061,952	49.47
Republican	Spencer Abraham (incumbent)	1,994,693	47.86
Green	Matthew Abel	37,542	0.90
Libertarian	Michael Corliss	29,966	0.72
Reform	Mark Forton	26,274	0.63
Constitution	John Mangopoulos	11,628	0.28
Natural Law	William Quarton	5,630	0.14
Total votes		4,165,685	100.00
Democratic gain from Republican			

==== Counties that flipped from Democratic to Republican ====
- Delta (largest city: Escanaba)

==== Counties that flipped from Republican to Democratic ====
- Lake (largest village: Baldwin)
- Monroe (largest city: Monroe)
- Macomb (largest city: Warren)
- Muskegon (largest city: Muskegon)

== See also ==
- 2000 United States Senate elections
