= No Remorse =

No Remorse may refer to:

== Music ==
- No Remorse (band), a British neo-Nazi rock band formed in 1986
- No Remorse Records, a German heavy metal record label
- No Remorse (Motörhead album), 1984
- No Remorse (Tokyo Blade album), 1989
- "No Remorse", a song by Metallica from Kill 'Em All, 1983
- "No Remorse (I Wanna Die)", a song by Slayer and Atari Teenage Riot from the Spawn soundtrack album, 1997

== Other uses ==
- Crusader: No Remorse, the 1995 first title in the Crusader action video game series
- Jesse Stone: No Remorse, a 2010 American television mystery film

== See also ==
- No Mercy, No Remorse
