= Buyer's Remorse (book) =

2016 book by Bill Press

Buyer's Remorse: How Obama Let Progressives Down
- First edition
- Author: Bill Press
- Language: English
- Subject: Barack Obama, disappointment, left-wing politics in America
- Genre: Non-fiction
- Publisher: Threshold Editions
- Publication date: 2016
- Publication place: United States
- ISBN: 978-1-4767-9261-3
- OCLC: 913336872

Buyer's Remorse: How Obama Let Progressives Down is a 2016 political book authored by Bill Press. Presidential candidate Bernie Sanders wrote a blurb for it.

== Pre-publication ==
A jacket blurb by Bernie Sanders reading "Bill Press makes the case why, long after taking the oath of office, the next president of the United States must keep rallying the people who elected him or her on behalf of progressive causes. That is the only way real change will happen. Read this book" ignited a press and social media conversation about whether Sanders was better off to separate himself from or associate himself with Obama administration policies in his campaign for the presidency.
