= The Stephanie Miller Show =

American talk radio program

- Other names: The Stephanie Miller Newscast
- Genre: Political satire – Observational comedy
- Running time: 3 hours
- Country of origin: United States
- Language: English
- Home station: KTLK (2005–2013); KCAA (2014–present)
- Syndicates: Westwood One; (formerly Dial Global and Jones Radio Networks)
- TV adaptations: MSNBC; (April 30, 2007–May 2, 2007); Current TV; (March 26, 2012–August 15, 2013); Free Speech TV; (January 6, 2014–present)
- Starring: Stephanie Miller
- Announcer: Jim Ward
- Created by: Ron Hartenbaum; Tom Athans; Stephanie Miller
- Produced by: Rebekah Taylor; (2004–2012); Travis Bone; (2012–2015); Sean Comiskey & Yanira Johnson; (2015-2018); Sean Comiskey; (2017–present)
- Executive producers: Chris Lavoie (2004-2015); John Melendez (2015-2016); Vanessa Rumbles (2016-2017); Travis Bone; (2018–2023); Jody Hamilton; (2023–present)
- Recording studio: Los Angeles, California
- Original release: September 2004; 21 years ago
- Opening theme: "We're Not Gonna Take It" by Twisted Sister; (2004–2008; November 3, 2010); Walking on Sunshine by Katrina and the Waves; (2008–2013); Beautiful Day by U2 (2013); Walking on Sunshine by Katrina and the Waves; (2013); Fighter by Christina Aguilera; (2016–2018); Fight Song by Rachel Platten; (2018–2021) (2022–present); Here Comes The Sun by The Beatles; (2021)
- Website: www.stephaniemiller.com
- Podcast: The "Stephcast" by paid subscription

The Stephanie Miller Show is a syndicated progressive talk radio program that discusses politics, current events, and pop culture using a fast-paced, impromptu, comedic style. The three-hour show is hosted by Stephanie Miller and is syndicated by Westwood One. Voice artist Jim Ward formerly co-hosted the show and was a recurring guest prior to his retirement from entertainment in 2021 and subsequent death in 2025. Miller is frequently joined on the air by executive producer Jody Hamilton and general manager (and former executive producer) Chris Lavoie. The show debuted on September 7, 2004 and is broadcast live from Los Angeles, California each weekday morning from 6:00 a.m. – 9:00 a.m. Pacific Time, on Pacifica station, KPFK in LA, and radio stations throughout the U.S., as well as online, and via SiriusXM Progress Channel 127. The show is also video simulcast live on Free Speech TV. Audio of each day's show is also available commercial-free for download from the show's website via the paid subscription Stephcast, which has been available since June 2005. The radio show should not be confused with Miller's short-lived 1995 syndicated TV talk show with the same name.

Via its affiliate network, satellite radio, online listening, video simulcast, and podcast, The Stephanie Miller Show has a weekly audience of approximately six million listeners. The show's audience has grown from 1 million in fall 2005 on 40 affiliates.

In 2017, Talkers Magazine ranked Miller the 23rd most important radio talk show host in America. In 2011, Miller won the Talkers Magazine Judy Jarvis Memorial Award for Outstanding Contributions to Talk Radio by a Woman.

== Show history ==
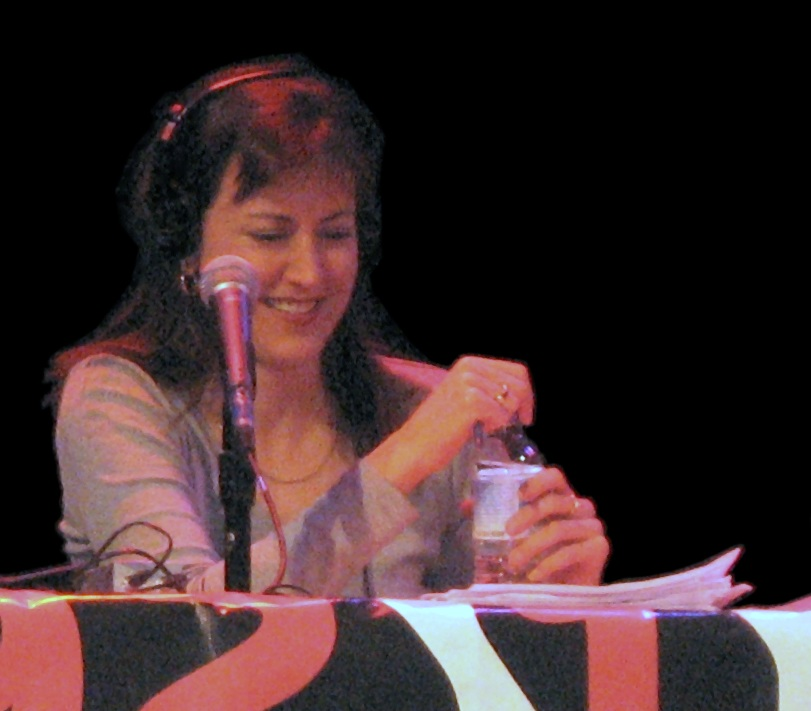
Miller at an event for 92.1 FM in 2006

The Stephanie Miller Show premiered on September 7, 2004. In launching the show, Miller said, "As talk radio has more and more become a sea of right-wing wackos, I think the audience has finally recognized the need to balance that with some good left-wing wackos, and I'm thrilled to be able to fill that need." When the show began in 2004, the on-air personalities were Stephanie Miller as host, "Voice Deity" Jim Ward as co-host, and "Boy Toy" Chris Lavoie as Executive Producer, the same team that worked with Miller on her previous radio show from 1997-2000. The show was originally dubbed Operation Take Back America, and primarily consisted of Miller and Ward, with Lavoie interjecting periodically. Lavoie's on-air presence expanded over the years. Associate Producer Rebekah Taylor (nee Baker), who screened phone callers, would also occasionally be heard on air.

The show has been video simulcast since 2010, starting with Ustream from 2010 to 2013, and Current TV from March 2012 to August 2013. In January 2014 the show began simulcasting on Free Speech TV. In addition, the show was also simulcast on MSNBC for 3 days in April–May 2007. (For details see TV and video simulcasting).

In addition to broadcast, online listening, and video simulcast options, Miller's show has been available since fall 2004 on satellite radio, originally on Sirius Satellite Radio through July 2007, when it switched to XM Satellite Radio. In May 2011, the show moved to the merged SiriusXM satellite radio, where the entire show is now broadcast live on SiriusXM Progress with a one-hour "best of" on Saturdays and Sundays. (For details see Satellite radio).

Miller's show was broadcast from the KTLK studios in Los Angeles through the end of December 2013. In January 2014, Miller began hosting the show from a studio in her home, following the decision of KTLK to change to an all-conservative talk format and become the flagship station for conservative radio host Rush Limbaugh. (For details see Production and distribution).

In September 2014, Miller began the commercial-free and uncensored Stephanie Miller's Happy Hour podcast by paid subscription. In early 2018, the podcast launched for free, using sponsors in place of paid subscribers. Paid subscriptions for the video version of the podcast were still available.

Stephanie Miller came out as a lesbian during hour two of the show broadcast on August 13, 2010.

== Show format ==
The show is primarily a mix of comedy and politics, featuring a rotating mix of in-studio and phone guests, and listener calls. While most of the show focuses on politically-related topics, these are interspersed with comedic discussions about other current events, pop culture and the personal lives of Miller and others on the show. Because the show can include interviews with political figures among jokes appealing to a juvenile sense of humor, Miller has described the show's format as "senator, fart joke, senator, fart joke."

For many years Miller's co-host was Jim Ward, who imitated a wide number of public figures on the show including political leaders, celebrities, and historical figures. Ward had been with the show since it began in September 2004. He was originally on 5 days per week as co-host, but starting on June 2, 2014, his role was reduced to regular guest appearances (often the 3rd hour on Mondays, dubbed "Maximum Mookage Mondays"). On November 16, 2015, Ward returned to the show as co-host, and was then on Monday to Thursday for all 3 hours. He also previously worked with Miller on her show in the late nineties on KABC.

Currently sharing co-hosting duties are Chris Lavoie, and Executive Producer Jody Hamilton, serving as show engineer and occasional contributor. Collectively, this group are known as Mama's/Steph's Mooks. Recurring guest co-hosts are Carlos Alazraqui (Wednesdays), Dana Goldberg (Thursdays), and comic duo Frangela (Fridays). Other recurring contributors who regularly call and/or video conference into the show include Lee Papa (The Rude Pundit), the late Eric Boehlert, Charlie Pierce, Bob Cesca, Malcolm Nance, Jackie Schechner, Karl Frisch, and John Fugelsang. The show also regularly features the musical parodies of Rocky Mountain Mike and his collaborators.

== Production and distribution ==
The Stephanie Miller Show was launched on September 7, 2004, by WYD Media Management in association with Democracy Radio, and syndicated by Jones Radio Networks. In November 2005, WYD Media Management acquired Democracy Radio's portion of ownership in the show. Dial Global, acquired Jones Radio Networks in 2009, and Dial Global changed its name to Westwood One in 2013. The show is now produced by WYD Media Management, and syndicated nationally by Westwood One.

The show is currently available Monday to Friday live from 6:00 am to 9:00 am Pacific Time, 9:00 am to 12 noon Eastern Time on approximately 40 broadcast radio stations, and can also be heard online via many of these same stations, as well as the Progressive Voices website, Progressive Voices on iTunes, and TuneIn App. On satellite radio, the show can be heard live on SiriusXM Progress, Channel 127. It is also available on delay via CRN Digital Talk Radio Monday to Friday from 9:00 am to 12 noon Pacific Time, noon to 3:00 pm Eastern Time, on CRN Digital Talk 4. Recorded versions of the show with no commercials are also available on the same day of broadcast, via "The Stephanie Miller Show" podcast, available for free on all major platforms. Recordings of all shows going back to May 1, 2015, along with a few additional previous shows, are available to paid subscribers via the Stephcast audio archives.

Since the show began in September 2004, it has originated from Los Angeles, California except for a short period from December 1, 2009, to July 6, 2010, when it was bi-coastal, with Miller based in New York part-time, while her co-hosts and producers were based in Los Angeles. KTLK in Los Angeles began carrying Miller's show in April 2005. Until the end of 2013, Miller's show was broadcast from the KTLK studios in Los Angeles, when the station's owner Clear Channel (now IHeart Radio), announced that it was changing formats from progressive talk to conservative talk. Miller and her business partner Ron Hartenbaum, the founder of WYD Media Management (often referred to by Miller as the "owner of the show who is trying to kill me for the insurance money"), decided they could not continue to rely on corporate broadcast entities for studio space, and Miller built a studio in the basement of her home at her own expense. The live program is now produced from Miller's house in the Los Feliz neighborhood of Los Angeles from 6 am to 9 am Pacific Time weekdays. Upon the advent of the COVID-19 crisis in early 2020, having the home studio left Miller and her show better prepared than most other entertainment enterprises for the stay-at-home restrictions imposed as a result of the pandemic. However, Miller's planned 2020 Sexy Liberal Unity Tour was rescheduled after an initial show in Seattle in February 2020.

=== Satellite radio ===
When The Stephanie Miller Show debuted in the fall of 2004, Sirius Satellite Radio's Sirius Left channel 143 began carrying the show on delay in two parts: 9:00 PM to 10:00 PM Eastern, and 3:00 AM to 5:00 AM Eastern on weekdays. By mid-October 2005, Miller's full show was being carried on Sirius Left on delay from 9:00 pm to 12:00 pm Eastern, with the first 2 hours repeated again from 3:00 am to 5:00 am Eastern, along with additional repeats on the weekends. By late December 2006, the show was moved to 6:00 pm to 9:00 pm Eastern on Sirius Left., and remained on Sirius Left in this time slot until mid-November 2007, when The Stephanie Miller Show was removed completely from the Sirius schedule. On November 30, 2007, on her show blog, Miller announced that due to listener complaints to Sirius about her show's cancellation, Sirius Left would air one hour of the show at 8 pm Eastern Time each weekday beginning on December 3, 2007. On July 14, 2008, Miller's show switched from Sirius to XM Satellite Radio, and XM began broadcasting hours 2 and 3 of The Stephanie Miller Show live on channel 167 America Left, the first time even a portion of Miller's show had been carried live on satellite radio. In February 2009, America Left began to carry all three hours of the show live. In May 2011, when Sirius Left merged with XM America Left to become SiriusXM Left on channel 127, the channel continued to broadcast Miller's show live, but only hours 2 and 3. In August 2013, SiriusXM Left was renamed SiriusXM Progress, and began airing Miller's entire 3-hour show live where it continues to be aired weekdays, with a one-hour "best of" on Saturdays and Sundays.

=== TV and video simulcasting ===
A television simulcast version of the entire show is broadcast live on air each weekday on Free Speech TV. A recording of the Free Speech TV version of the show is usually on the show's website until the next show is broadcast. Recordings of many of the TV simulcasts are also available on the Free Speech TV website.

TV and video simulcasts of the show have been available since 2010. From November 2010 until late 2013, Ustream broadcast a video feed of the show. The show was also formerly simulcast on Current TV from March 26, 2012 until August 15, 2013, when live programming on Current ended in preparation of the transition of Current TV to Al Jazeera America. On Current TV, Talking Liberally: The Stephanie Miller Show was part of a morning block with The Bill Press Show. After leaving Current, the show moved to Free Speech TV, where a video simulcast has aired since January 6, 2014, after a successful Indiegogo campaign by both Miller and Free Speech to raise the money needed to buy equipment and produce the TV side of the show for Free Speech TV. The previous morning block with The Bill Press Show has been reunited on Free Speech TV, although Free Speech only airs the second hour of Press's show.

The show was simulcast on MSNBC for three days starting April 30, 2007, as part of a series of programs filling the former time slot of Don Imus. The show aired live on MSNBC from 6:00 am to 9:00 am Eastern, and on delay on the radio from 9:00 am to noon Eastern. During this period, the show originated from MSNBC's studio in Secaucus, New Jersey, the studios and time slot formerly used by the canceled Imus in the Morning. On the first day on MSNBC, Miller visibly sweated from her armpits which she joked about in her usual self-deprecating manner. As a result, onscreen she was dubbed "Sweaty Chick". Miller and her on-air staff received generally favorable reviews for their appearance. A fan petition was started to make the show the permanent replacement for the Imus MSNBC show. After the stint, she said that she was not interested in the position full-time. Joe Scarborough's show Morning Joe is now in this time slot.

=== Remote broadcasts ===
The show has periodically done remote broadcasts. The show was broadcast from the Democratic National Convention, in 2008, 2012, and 2016. At the 2016 DNC in Philadelphia, Pennsylvania Frangela co-hosted with Miller. The show also did a remote broadcast from the 2008 Republican National Convention in Minneapolis, Minnesota. Miller was also on-site on January 20, 2009, in Washington D.C. for the inauguration of President Barack Obama, with Miller providing running commentary and Frangela hosting in-studio from Los Angeles. In conjunction with this inauguration, on January 18, 2009, Miller, co-host Jim Ward, and Executive Producer Chris Lavoie, participated in Obama Radio Nation, a live audience show celebrating Obama's inauguration, and the role of progressive radio in the 2008 elections. For Obama's second inauguration in 2013, the full show was broadcast from Washington D.C. In the past, the show also periodically broadcast from several affiliate cities, with Miller and Ward appearing in front of a live audience. During these remote broadcasts, audience questions and interactions took the place of phone calls.

== Happy Hour podcast ==
On September 12, 2014 Miller began Stephanie Miller's Happy Hour podcast, a once per week uncensored show of original content available via paid subscription. The Happy Hour features many of the sidekicks and guests who appear on Miller's radio show, as well as other celebrities and comedians, usually consuming alcohol while they chat.

On March 30, 2018, a teaser trailer was released announcing that future episodes would be available without subscription and for free. Paid subscriptions to the video version of the podcast remained available.
