= Stephanie Miller =

American comedian and political commentator (born 1961)

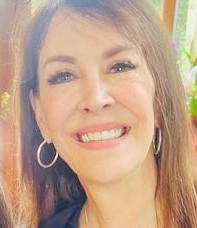
- Miller in October 2025
- Born: Stephanie Catherine Miller; September 29, 1961 (age 65); Washington, D.C., U.S.
- Education: University of Southern California
- Father: William E. Miller
- Website: www.stephaniemiller.com

Stephanie Catherine Miller (born September 29, 1961) is an American political commentator, comedian, and host of The Stephanie Miller Show, a Progressive talk radio program produced in Los Angeles, California, by WYD Media Management and syndicated nationally by Westwood One. In 2017, Talkers Magazine ranked her the 23rd-most important radio talk show host in the U.S. Miller has leveraged her talk show via various platforms including online, as well as via her Sexy Liberal Tour live comedy show.

== Early life ==
Miller was born in Washington, D.C., the daughter of Stephanie (Wagner) (1923–2023), and former U.S. Representative William E. Miller (1914–83), who was Barry Goldwater's running mate in the 1964 presidential election and a chairman of the Republican National Committee. After her father left the United States Congress when Miller was three years old, her family moved to her father's hometown of Lockport, New York. She is the youngest of four children; her two elder sisters, Libby and Mary, are almost 20 years her senior. She also has an older brother, William Jr. Her brother ran unsuccessfully for the United States House of Representatives from upstate New York, in 1992 and 1994.

Miller's father died in 1983; her mother died in 2023.

Miller's first efforts at comedy were in high school, performing in a sketch, "Torn Between Two Lovers," requiring a specially-sewn dress with panels that boys ripped open every time a chorus of the song was heard. Recalling the performance, Miller says, "I got my first laugh, and that was it. It's like a drug. It's always been my only drug." After completing her secondary education in private Catholic schools, graduating from DeSales High School in Lockport in 1979, Miller attended the University of Southern California, earning a degree in theatre. Her original plan after college "was to be Carol Burnett". On September 29, 2015, Burnett called Miller on her radio show to wish her happy birthday. On the phone, Miller told Burnett she always wanted to be her, "but it didn't work out. She made me cry when she said I shouldn't be Carol Burnett because there's only one Stephanie Miller and nobody does what I do. I was bawling."

== Stand-up comedy ==
Miller's first job after graduation from college was at the Laugh Factory, a comedy club in Hollywood, California, where she worked for club owner Jamie Masada by answering phones, putting names on the marquee, and being a cocktail waitress while also performing stand-up at the club. When Miller moved back to upstate New York a few years later, she worked at Yuk Yuk's Comedy Club in Buffalo, living in a $125 per month apartment over a pizza parlor near the club. While working in radio in the 1980s and 1990s, she also performed at many comedy clubs around New York City, Chicago, and Los Angeles. She appeared twice on A & E's An Evening at the Improv, on the A&E TV Network, on August 5, 1988, and March 3, 1989. She was also the first comedian to perform when the Chicago Improv club opened. In addition, she performed a one-woman Off-Broadway show while living in New York City in the early 1990s. Miller also performed at the Laugh Factory when she moved back to Los Angeles from New York City in 2003. Miller says she has a talk with her late father every time she is about to face an audience.

== Acting roles ==
Miller initially set out to be an actress, hoping to eventually star in her own sitcom or in movies. Early in her career she had small roles as a nun in the 1984 TV movie Shattered Vows and as a nurse on General Hospital. After gaining prominence as a radio and TV host, she had acting roles where she essentially played herself, as in the movie View from the Top and an episode of the TV series Diagnosis: Murder. Miller's most significant role was in the 1997 comedy film Just Write. During the late 1990s, she also explored doing a television sitcom with producer Barry Kemp, who cast her in a pilot for ABC.

== Radio and television career ==
=== Early radio career ===
Miller did not plan a career in radio. In her words, "I always say radio was an accident until they started paying me a lot of money and then it wasn't an accident anymore."

She began her radio career after her father's death in 1983, when she returned to Lockport from California. Her first radio experience was delivering humorous bits on Sandy Beach's morning show on Hot 104 WNYS in Buffalo, New York, which included doing impressions of Katharine Hepburn. She then took an on-air job at radio station WLVL in Lockport, where she went from evenings to afternoon drive to mornings in three months. She then sent a tape to Brother Wease (Alan Levin), the morning drive host at WCMF in Rochester, New York. Levin "hired her as soon as I heard her tape," and in 1985 she went to WCMF to work as "Sister Sleaze" on the Brother Wease show. Speaking about Miller, Levin has been very complimentary, noting "She's very manic, very bright, very funny and creative." While working with Miller, in reply to friends asking Levin "how come you give that girl so much mike?" he responded: "Because she's phenomenal. Don't try and compete; let people fly. I let her fly, and we had a ball." After Rochester, Miller progressed to larger markets, as morning co-host at radio station WCKG in Chicago with John Howell from early 1988 to October 1989, and as morning co-host with Howard Hoffman at Hot 97 WQHT in New York City for three years until 1993.

In 1993, Miller headed back to Los Angeles to develop a sitcom for Warner Brothers that never materialized. Instead, in 1994 she began her talk radio career when was hired by talk station KFI in Los Angeles, initially for her own weekend show which quickly became a weeknight radio show where Miller achieved high ratings. During the show, as she had on her earlier stations in Rochester and New York City, Miller would sometimes call her mother (also named Stephanie) in upstate New York on the phone, and her mother would also co-host when she came to visit in-person. Miller's mother would later do the same on her radio show at KABC. On her show on KFI, Miller began to incorporate political talk. "It was the first time I had done talk radio, and I was like, 'Oh, you mean just me talk, with no music?'" she recalls. "I was like, blah, blah, blah. Oh, I still have 10 minutes left. That's when I guess I started to get political, and I started to realize more of my liberal leanings." She states that her turning point in terms of being outspoken about politics came in August 1992, when she heard Pat Buchanan's gay-bashing "culture wars" speech at the Republican Convention. "It was just so mean. It changed everything for me."

=== Television talk show ===
In autumn 1995 Miller began hosting her own late night television talk show, The Stephanie Miller Show, syndicated by Buena Vista Television. The show differed from other late night television talk shows in having a woman as host, no band, no desk, nightclub-style seating for the studio audience, and pre-taped sketches starring Miller as real-life characters. Miller held live conversations with members of the viewing audience by video phone. Anne Beatts, formerly a writer on Saturday Night Live, was executive producer and a writer for the show. Beatts enjoyed working on the show with Miller, and liked the immediacy of a daily talk show. However, the show was canceled in December 1995 after only 13 weeks. Danny Bonaduce filled in for Miller the last week the show was on the air. Reflecting on the experience a few years later for an article in The Buffalo News, Miller said, "I think 13 weeks is a pretty tough shot for any unknown in late night. I felt like my dad must have felt in the 1964 campaign: 'I have no shot in hell, but I'll just give it a try." Comedian and voice actor Carlos Alazraqui, who later worked with Miller on her KABC radio show, and is a regular guest on her radio program (Coffee with Carlos), was part of the Irregular Regulars sketch comedy group on Miller's television show.

=== Return to radio ===
Stating that "After a year in the Federal Talk Show Relocation Program, I decided to come home to radio," Miller returned to Los Angeles radio in June 1997, first doing afternoons at KTZN ("The Zone") and then moving to evenings at KABC. It was during this period that she first began working with Chris Lavoie, who would later be her long-time executive producer on her syndicated radio show, which began in 2004. Impressionist Jim Ward, who is on Miller's radio show, also was with her on KABC, along with Carlos Alazraqui. The show was syndicated in September 1998 on approximately 20 stations. KABC canceled Miller's show in March 2000. The show continued in syndication on other stations for another week, but was then canceled completely. According to Miller, the firing from KABC was for the "somewhat racy content of my show" and for being "too liberal."

=== TV hosting ===
Along with her radio show, Miller began co-hosting in 1997 the CNBC television show Equal Time as the liberal counterpoint to conservative Bay Buchanan. Miller later said that she didn't enjoy Equal Time "very much" and that Buchanan would only talk to her when the camera was on. Miller left the show in 1998 to become the original host and a writer for a year on the Fox Family channel program Show Me the Funny. In February 2000, shortly before her departure from KABC, Miller began hosting the Oxygen Channel's revival of the game show I've Got a Secret. After her radio show on the ABC Radio Today network ended, Miller moved back to the New York City area and worked for the Oxygen Channel. She hosted its revival of I've Got a Secret, which ran for 120 episodes until 2001. Miller and May Lee also co-hosted Oxygen's 30-minute, weekday TV magazine show, Pure Oxygen, from 2000 to 2002. Lee said she and Miller "made a pretty good team - [Miller] as the funny, goofy half; me as the serious, sophisticated other half. We worked well together and understood our respective roles on the show."

=== TV and radio hosting: 2003 and later ===
After leaving Oxygen, Miller returned to Los Angeles in 2003, and shopped a pilot that she co-produced, which she described as a cross between The Carol Burnett Show and Politically Incorrect. The pilot was not picked up. From 2004 to 2005, Miller also served as a frequent panelist on the PAX TV game show Balderdash, which was hosted by Miller's friend Elayne Boosler. In 2004, Miller was initially offered the original morning show at Air America, but the offer was withdrawn, and the slot was taken by Morning Sedition, with Marc Maron, Mark Riley, and Sue Ellicott. In 2006, CNN discussed with Miller the possibility of a television show; however, the show was never developed.

== The Stephanie Miller Show ==
On September 7, 2004, The Stephanie Miller Show was launched by Democracy Radio and WYD Media Management.

Miller's show's audience has grown to approximately 6 million weekly listeners (2017). She was ranked second in Los Angeles right behind The Rush Limbaugh Show. In 2017, Talkers Magazine ranked her the 23rd most important radio talk show host in America. The 2014 Talkers Heavy Hundred list ranked Stephanie Miller as the 22nd most important radio talk show host as well as the No. 3 radio talk host in the LGBT category in the United States market. In 2011, Miller won the Talkers Magazine Judy Jarvis Memorial Award for Outstanding Contributions to Talk Radio by a Woman.

Since 2010, TV and video simulcasts of The Stephanie Miller Show have been broadcast through numerous outlets, including Ustream (2010–2013), Current TV (2012–2013), Free Speech TV (2014–present), and Twitch.

== Goldwater/Miller '08 Presidential Campaign ==
In 2007, Miller launched a spoof Presidential campaign with CC Goldwater, the granddaughter of Barry Goldwater. Miller's father ran with Barry Goldwater as vice president in 1964. The 2008 campaign was dubbed Goldwater/Miller '08...ex-Republican girls gone wild! Commenting on the campaign, Miller stated, "We are the ticket of low expectations and morals and are damn proud of it, too." During the campaign, it was noted that with over $345 cash on hand, Goldwater wanted to buy some media time in the 4:00-4:15 am time slot in Kern County, California.

== Sexy Liberal Comedy Tour ==
Starting with the first show on April 23, 2011, in Madison, Wisconsin, Miller's live Sexy Liberal Comedy Tour has periodically toured the country. After Donald Trump became president, the tour was renamed the Sexy Liberal Resistance Tour. The cast includes Miller, John Fugelsang, and the comedy duo Frangela, for an evening of liberal humor and commentary. The shows also have special guests. The comedy album, Stephanie Miller's Sexy Liberal Tour, Vol. 1, was released in December 2011. It became the first album to reach No. 1 on the comedy charts for iTunes, Amazon.com, and Billboard. On the day of its release, it was the No. 2 most downloaded album on Amazon and remained on the Billboard Comedy Album charts for 6 weeks. A DVD of the November 2016 pre-election show in Los Angeles is also available. In September 2012, Current TV broadcast a behind-the-scenes documentary about the Sexy Liberal Tour, including the origins of the Sexy Liberal Tour and never-before-seen footage and commentary from Miller and her then tour co-hosts John Fugelsang, Hal Sparks, and Aisha Tyler, as they toured the country.

The idea for the Sexy Liberal Tour originated in-studio during a live radio broadcast with Miller and John Fugelsang in 2011. The goal was to do a concert in Madison, Wisconsin to raise money for the recall of Wisconsin Governor Scott Walker. Tickets went on sale two weeks prior to the show date and were sold out within four days.

On July 24, 2016, during a performance of the Sexy Liberal Comedy Tour in Philadelphia in conjunction with the 2016 Democratic National Convention, Miller fell off the stage at the Walnut Street Theatre, falling into the orchestra pit. John Fugelsang jumped into the orchestra pit after Miller to check on her. Civil rights lawyer Gloria Allred who was at the show, also came to her aid. Fugelsang and Frangela finished up the performance without her. Miller missed the next day's radio show, but was back on the air on Tuesday July 26.

In early 2024, the project announced Save The World Comedy Tour shows with veterans Stephanie Miller, John Fugelsang, Hal Sparks and Frangela.

== Stephanie Miller's Happy Hour podcast ==
On September 12, 2014, Miller began Stephanie Miller's Happy Hour podcast, released weekly via paid subscription. This uncensored show of original content features many of the regulars and guests from her radio show, and other celebrities and comedians, typically consuming alcohol (as with any other happy hour) while they chat. Video versions of the Happy Hour are also available. The concept was suggested by Travis Bone, one of Miller's producers, who thought listeners might like to hear and see what it's like to be at a party at Stephanie's house. It also debuted on the Billboard charts on February 18, 2015, at No. 2, and was dubbed by Billboard as its "Hot Shot Debut". The Best of Stephanie Miller's Happy Hour, Volume 2, released in November 2015, repeated the feat.

== Sexy Liberal! Of Me I Sing book release ==
In 2016, Miller released Sexy Liberal! Of Me I Sing, a combination of memoir and political humor. It was initially released as an ebook where it immediately became No. 1 on Amazon in political, humor, and memoirs, and later was released in paperback.

== Personal life ==
Miller lives in the Los Feliz section of Los Angeles with her rescue dogs, Bonnie and Clyde. She has never been married and has no children, and often jokingly refers to herself as "a childless loser". In the 1990s, she had celebrity dates with parody songwriter "Weird Al" Yankovic and Barry Williams of Greg Brady fame.

While she had been open about her sexuality with family and friends for many years, in 2010 in the midst of the furor over gay marriage and Proposition 8 in California, she decided to publicly announce that she is a lesbian. On her August 13, 2010, radio show, Miller said, "I've reached my personal tipping point to say I am a gay woman." She then movingly shared details about her private life and personal journey in deciding to publicly disclose that she is gay. Miller credited country singer Chely Wright with helping her in coming out. Commenting in an interview with the San Diego Gay and Lesbian News on her decision, Miller said, "I realized that I can't authentically talk to [my listeners] about these issues anymore without walking in my truth. I can't just stand on the sidelines as an unbiased observer." After Miller came out as gay, she recorded a video for the It Gets Better Project, whose mission is to communicate to lesbian, gay, bisexual and transgender youth that it gets better. In the video she discussed how she had lost 15 years of closeness with her family because she mistakenly thought they wouldn't accept her as gay. The day after Miller came out, at a town hall in Seattle, Washington, a 16-year-old girl and her family came up to Miller "and they were all crying. They thanked me and told me I had given their daughter the courage to come out today. We all hugged and cried. And I told the young girl that it's going to be okay now; you're going to have a good life."

Miller has been public about having plastic surgery, stating "As it turns out, you can fool Mother Nature!! She's not that bright." Miller's plastic surgery includes a short-scar lift, a forehead lift, under-eye peels, a permanent nose job, and lip and eye lining.
