= Democracy Radio =

American nonprofit organization

Democracy Radio was an American nonprofit organization founded in 2002 by Tom Athans and Paul Fiddick, which aimed to address what its founders saw as political imbalance on American commercial radio. The concept was to develop and incubate progressive-oriented talk programming and enlist radio networks to market the programs to stations around the country. Democracy Radio developed and produced radio talk shows that launched the national careers of Ed Schultz and Stephanie Miller, among others.

== History ==
Tom Athans, a veteran of the United States Air Force and former staffer for U.S. Representative Dale Kildee, founded Democracy Radio in 2002.

A 2003 New York Times story quoted Athans: "We're going to go out and identify talent and help them to create programming and actually connect them with local stations." Late in January 2003, Democracy Radio gathered over 30 progressive talk show hosts to Capitol Hill to provide coverage of the 2003 State of the Union Address.

In January 2004, Democracy Radio launched its first nationally syndicated show, The Ed Schultz Show, hosted by Ed Schultz of KFGO in Fargo, North Dakota. Democracy Radio retained Jones Radio Networks to handle affiliate relations and advertising sales. The show was commercially successful, and grew to over 100 stations and 8 of the top 10 markets.

In September 2004, Democracy Radio debuted The Stephanie Miller Show in conjunction with Ron Hartenbaum's WYD Media.

On June 8, 2005, Democracy Radio sold its stake in The Ed Schultz Show to a new company headed by radio executive Randy Michaels, the former CEO of Clear Channel Radio.

In November 2005, Democracy Radio closed after Athans joined the management team of Air America. WYD Media, Democracy Radio's partner in The Stephanie Miller Show, purchased Democracy Radio's shares and assumed sole ownership of the venture.
