= Bill Press =

American talk radio host (born 1940)

- Press in 2026 at Politics and Prose

Chair of the California Democratic Party
- In office April 3, 1993 – February 22, 1996
- Preceded by: Phil Angelides
- Succeeded by: Art Torres

Personal details
- Born: William H. Press; April 8, 1940 (age 86) Wilmington, Delaware, U.S.
- Party: Democratic
- Education: Salesianum School; Niagara University (BA); University of Fribourg (STB)
- Occupation: Talk radio host, political commentator, author

William H. Press (born April 8, 1940) is an American talk radio host, podcaster, liberal pundit and author. He was chairman of the California Democratic Party from 1993 to 1996, and is a senior political contributor on CNN. He hosts The Bill Press Pod podcast, and his weekly column is syndicated by Tribune Content Agency.

== Early life ==
Born in Wilmington, Delaware, and raised in Delaware City, Delaware, Press was educated at Salesianum School, a private Roman Catholic secondary school in Wilmington, in 1958, followed by Niagara University from which he gained a Bachelor of Arts degree in philosophy, and the University of Fribourg in which he gained a Bachelor of Sacred Theology degree.

== Career ==
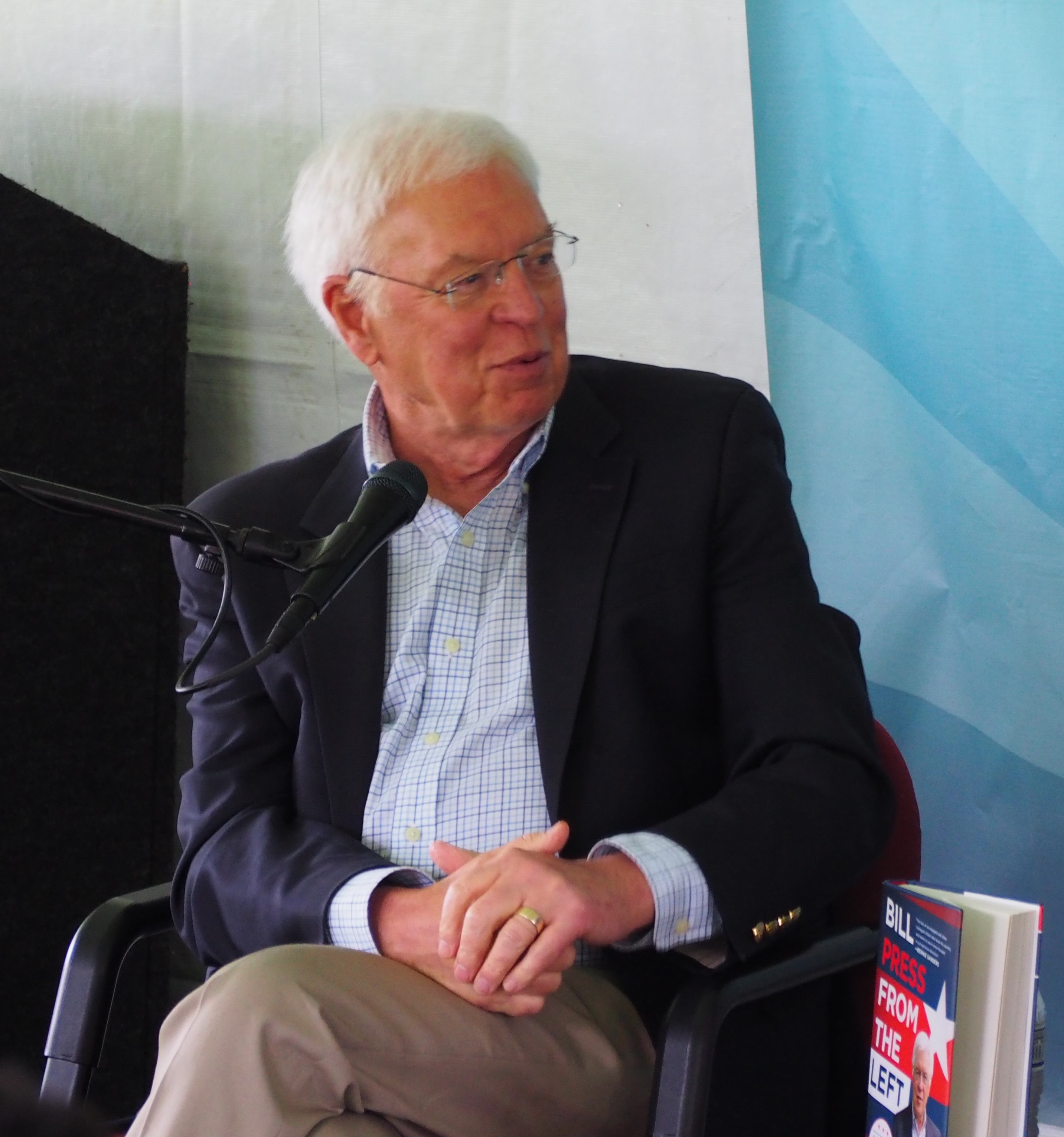
Press in 2018

=== Politics ===
Press served in different appointed positions such as a chief of staff to Republican California state senator Peter Behr (1971–73), and as director of the California Office of Planning and Research under Democratic governor Jerry Brown (1975–79).

Press was the chairman of the California Democratic Party from 1993 to 1996.

Press was an early backer of Bernie Sanders for president in 2016, hosting Sanders and his advisors for strategy sessions at his home before the campaign began.

=== Media ===
Press started his broadcasting career in Los Angeles for TV stations KABC-TV and KCOP-TV. He has worked as a political commentator for CNN and MSNBC. He is best known for co-hosting CNN's Spin Room opposite Tucker Carlson, and Crossfire and MSNBC's Buchanan and Press.

Since May 2005, Press has been a contributing blogger at The Huffington Post. He also contributes blogs to The Hill. In January 2012, Press filled in for Keith Olbermann on Current TV's coverage of the 2012 Florida Republican primary.

Since September 2005, Press has been hosting a daily liberal talk radio program, The Bill Press Show. It is heard on satellite radio, streamed live from the show's website, and available from the show's YouTube channel. It was formerly broadcast on terrestrial radio affiliates in the United States live from 6-9 AM ET. Originally syndicated by Jones Radio, the radio show was syndicated by Dial Global until 2017. On March 5, 2012, the show was announced to be simulcast on Current TV alongside The Stephanie Miller Show as part of morning programming. As a result of Current TV becoming Al Jazeera America, The Bill Press Show moved to Free Speech TV, where it stayed until its move to The Young Turks Network in 2016. As part of the move to the Turks, terrestrial syndication of the program was dropped in January 2017 (except for WCPT-AM Chicago).

== Personal life ==
Press is a longtime resident of Inverness, California, having moved there in 1970. He also resides in Washington, D.C.

Press was steeped in Catholicism from an early age. He was an altar boy and took vows of obedience, poverty and chastity. He describes his young self as a "soldier in God's army".

== Works ==
- Eyewitness : A California Perspective, 1988. ISBN 0-939061-01-5
- Spin This: All the Ways We Don't Tell the Truth, with a foreword by Bill Maher, 2002. ISBN 0-7434-4267-9
- Bush Must Go!- The Top Ten Reasons Why George Bush Doesn't Deserve a Second Term, 2004. ISBN 0-525-94840-6
- How The Republicans Stole Christmas: The Republican Party's Declared Monopoly on Religion and What Democrats Can Do to Take it Back, 2005. ISBN 0-385-51605-3
- How The Republicans Stole Religion: Why the Religious Right is Wrong about Faith & Politics and What We Can Do to Make it Right, Doubleday, 2005. ISBN 978-0-385-51605-1
- Trainwreck: The End of the Conservative Revolution (and Not a Moment Too Soon), Wiley, 2008. ISBN 978-0-470-18240-6
- Toxic Talk: How the Radical Right Has Poisoned America's Airwaves. New York: Thomas Dunne Books. 2010. ISBN 978-0-312-60629-9.
- The Obama Hate Machine. New York: Thomas Dunne Books. 2012. ISBN 978-0-312-64164-1.
- Buyer's Remorse: How Obama Let Progressives Down. New York: Threshold Editions. 2016. ISBN 9781476792613. OCLC 913336872.
- From the Left: A Life in the Crossfire. New York: Thomas Dunne Books. 2018. ISBN 9781250147158.
- Trump Must Go: The Top 100 Reasons to Dump Trump (And One to Keep Him). New York: Thomas Dunne Books. 2018. ISBN 9781250306470.
