= KTNF =

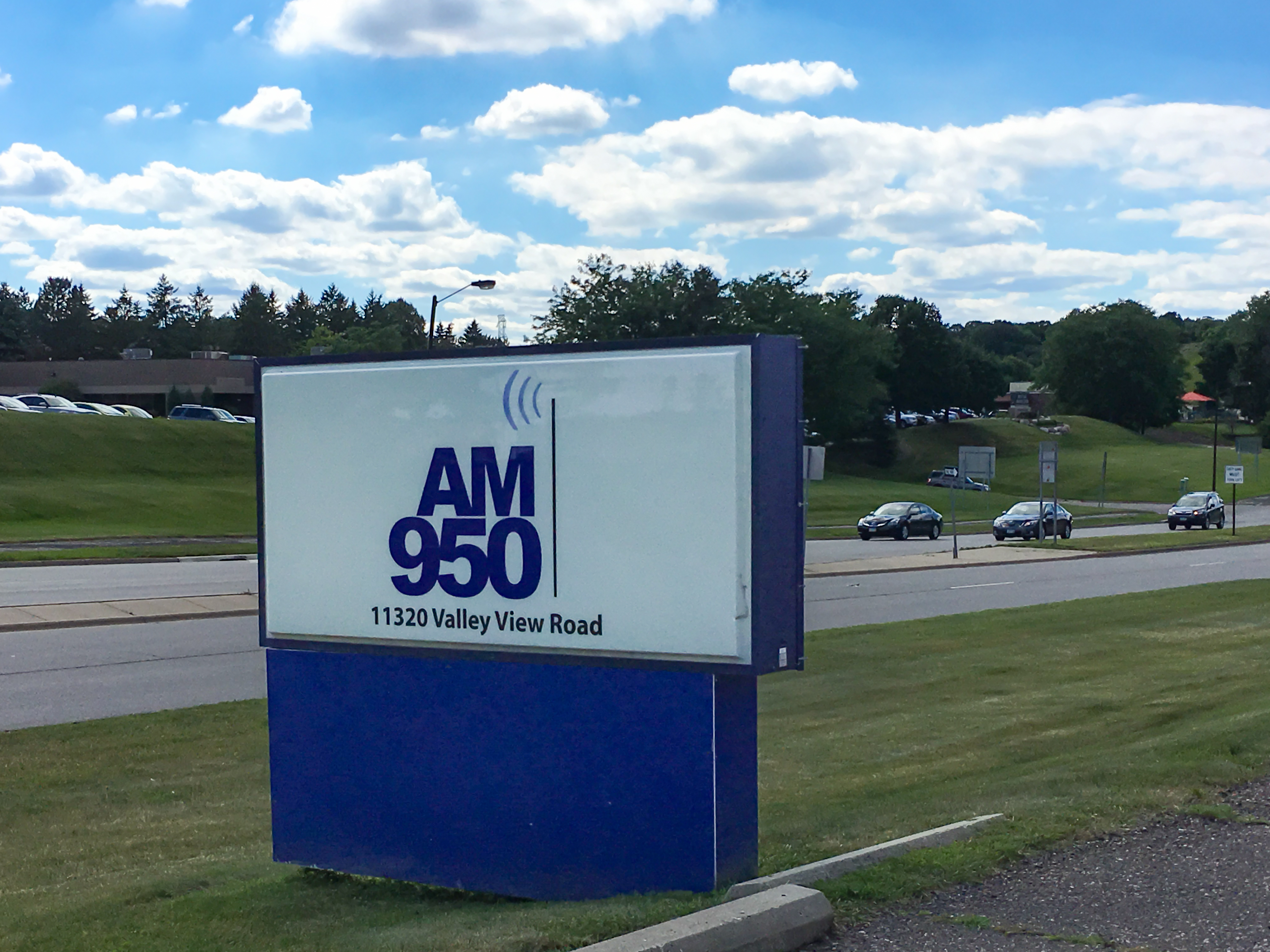

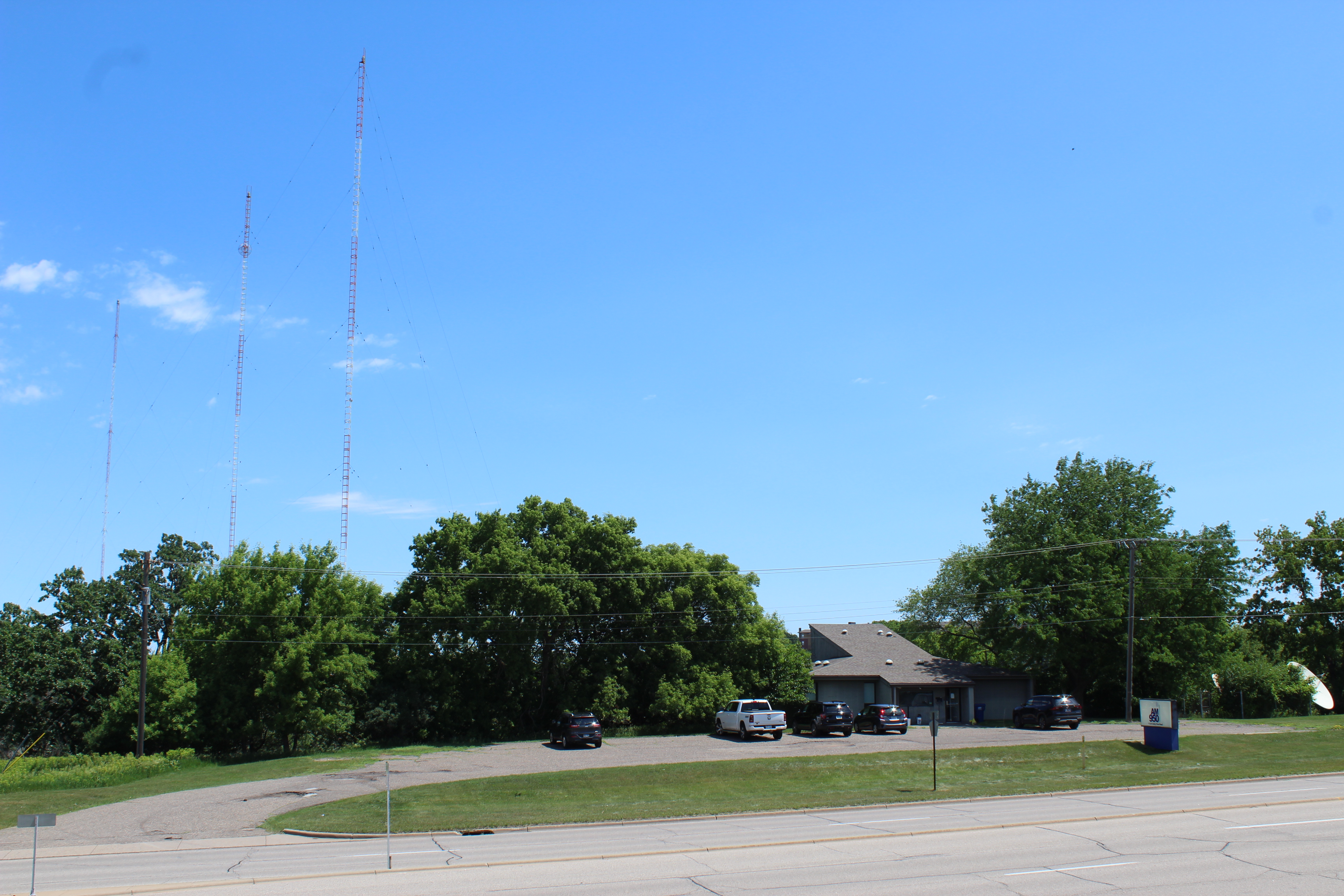
- St. Louis Park, Minnesota; United States
- Broadcast area: Minneapolis–Saint Paul
- Frequency: 950 kHz
- Branding: AM 950 KTNF, The Progressive Voice of Minnesota

Programming
- Format: Progressive talk radio
- Affiliations: AP Radio News; Pacifica Radio; Westwood One

Ownership
- Owner: Heartland Signal, LLC

History
- First air date: May 13, 1958
- Former call signs: KRSI (1958–1986); KJJO (1986–1989); KZOW (1989–1990); KJJO (1990–1995); KSGS (1995–2001); KDOW (2001); KCCO (2001–2004); KSNB (2004)

Technical information
- Licensing authority: FCC
- Facility ID: 57833
- Class: B
- Power: 1,000 watts
- Transmitter coordinates: 44°52′7.9″N 93°25′11.8″W

Links
- Public license information: Public file; LMS
- Webcast: Listen live
- Website: am950radio.com

KTNF (950 AM, "AM 950") is a commercial radio station licensed to serve St. Louis Park, Minnesota. Branded "The Progressive Voice of Minnesota", the station airs a combination of locally produced, and nationally syndicated progressive talk programming. It is owned by Heartland Signal, LLC.

KTNF's studios and transmitter are located on Valley View Road in Eden Prairie. It operates with 1,000 watts 24 hours a day using a directional antenna, with a two-tower array by day and a three-tower pattern at night.

Syndicated shows heard on KTNF include The Stephanie Miller Show, The Thom Hartmann Program, Democracy Now! with Amy Goodman and The Morning Drive with Santita Jackson. Most hours begin with an update from AP Radio News.

== History ==
The station signed on the air on May 13, 1958, as KRSI. It was owned by Radio Suburbia and its studios were located in St. Louis Park. On July 1, 1962, it started an FM sister station at 104.1 MHz, which is now KZJK. In October 1972, the two stations moved to what is now the AM station's current studio and transmitter facility in Eden Prairie. The station was acquired by Heartland Signal, LLC in 2026.
