= Heitkamp =

Heitkamp may refer to:

== People ==
- Heidi Heitkamp (born 1955), American politician and former US Senator from North Dakota
- Jason Heitkamp (fl. 2020s), American politician from North Dakota
- Joel Heitkamp (born 1961), American politician from North Dakota
- Mary Heitkamp, American athlete inducted into the Vermont Sports Hall of Fame

== Companies ==
- Heitkamp BauHolding, German construction and civil engineering company

== Places ==
- Heitkamp Planetarium and Observatory at Loras College

== See also ==
- Adolph F. Heidkamp (fl. 1920s–1940s), American politician from Michigan
