= Senator Heitkamp (disambiguation) =

Heidi Heitkamp (born 1955) was a U.S. Senator from North Dakota from 2013 to 2019. Senator Heitkamp may also refer to:

- Jason Heitkamp (fl. 2020s), North Dakota State Senate
- Joel Heitkamp (born 1961), North Dakota State Senate
