= Herne, North Rhine-Westphalia =

Herne
- City
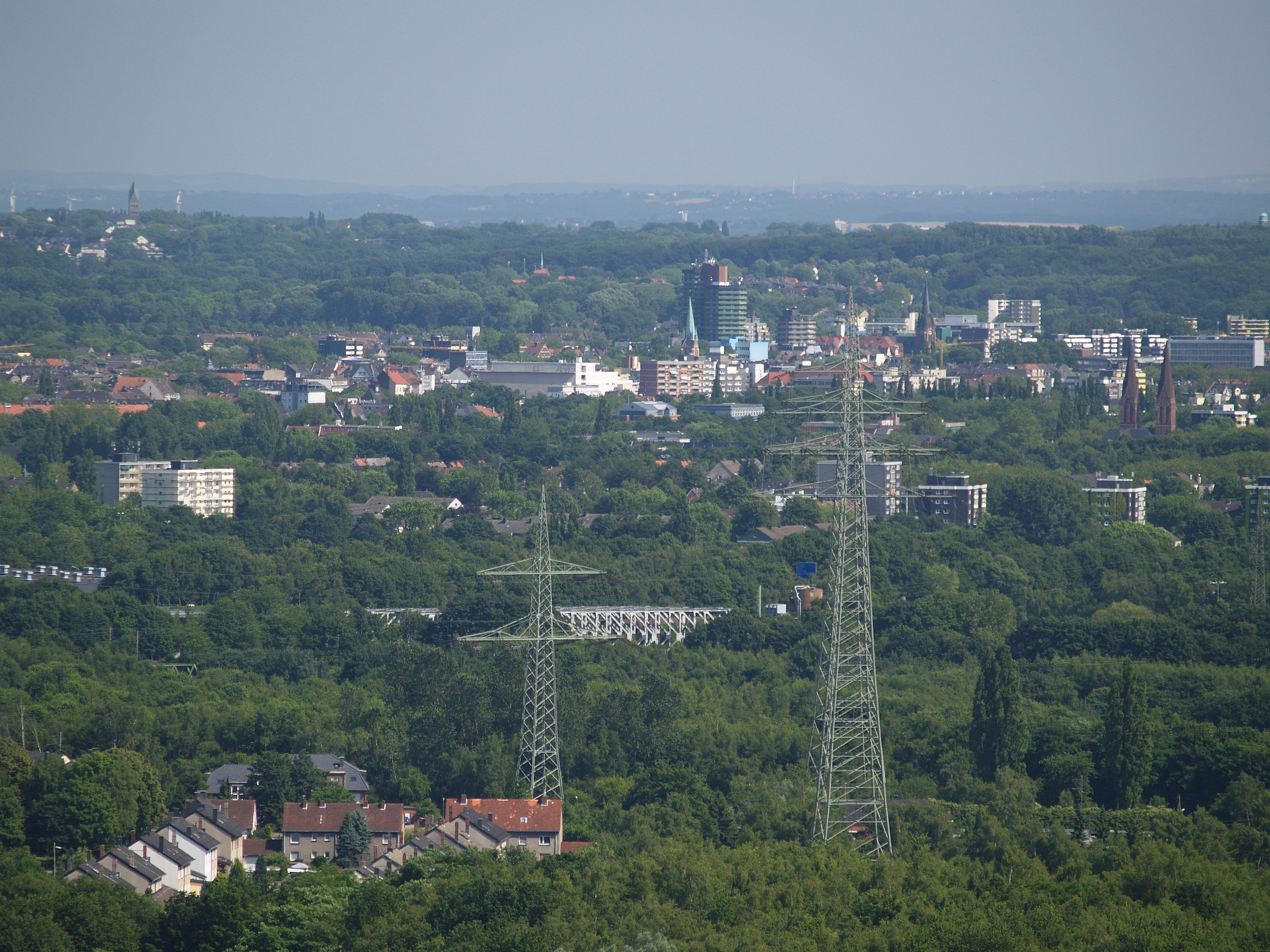
- View towards the center of Herne

- Flag Coat of arms
- Interactive map of Herne
- Location within Germany Location within North Rhine-Westphalia
- Coordinates: 51°33′N 07°13′E
- Country: Germany
- State: North Rhine-Westphalia
- Admin. region: Arnsberg
- District: Urban district
- Subdivisions: 4 districts

Government
  - Mayor (2020–25): Frank Dudda (SPD)
  - Governing parties: SPD/ CDU

Area
  - Total: 51.41 km^{2} (19.85 sq mi)
- Elevation: 65 m (213 ft)

Population (2025-12-31)
  - Total: 156,266
  - Density: 3,040/km^{2} (7,873/sq mi)
- Time zone: UTC+01:00 (CET)
  - Summer (DST): UTC+02:00 (CEST)
- Postal codes: 44601-44653
- Dialling codes: 02323, 02325
- Vehicle registration: HER, WAN
- Website: herne.de

Herne (German: [ˈhɛʁnə]) is a city in North Rhine-Westphalia, Germany. It is located in the Ruhr area directly between the cities of Bochum, and Gelsenkirchen.

== History ==
Herne (ancient Haranni) was a tiny village until the 19th century. When the mining of coal (and possibly ore) and the production of coke (the fuel processed from the harvested coal) and steel began, the villages of the Ruhr area had an influx of people, mostly from the east of Germany.

Herne is located on the direct axis between Bochum to the south and Recklinghausen to the north, with Münster in the north, Gelsenkirchen to the west, and Castrop-Rauxel and Dortmund to the east. The physical border between Herne and Recklinghausen is the bridge at the Bochumer Strasse across the Rhine–Herne Canal. A little further north of the canal flows the Emscher river, with the former abundance of wild horses that were caught in the Emscher Valley (Emschertal), then sold and/or traded at the yearly horse market at Crange, which later developed into the "Cranger Kirmes". After World War II, Herne was known as "Die Goldene Stadt" ("The Golden City") because of the comparatively limited damage suffered during World War II.

=== World War II ===
Herne was targeted by the Royal Air Force in June 1940, early in World War II, two residents died and there was minor property damage. The Krupp Treibstoffwerke oil refinery near the local Shamrock mine (de:Zeche Shamrock), and ¾ of the coal mine were bombed during the oil campaign of World War II.

On 31 March 1945, the Wehrmacht destroyed the bridges over the Rhine–Herne Canal and the River Emscher, and fighting occurred in the area. On April 9, 1945, American troops entered and occupied Herne. German forces had already been evacuated from the city the previous day.

=== Present day ===
Present-day Herne includes the former settlements of Haranni, originating at the south end of the Bahnhofstrasse and just across the Evangelische Hauptkirche Herne (main Lutheran Church—seems to be called "Kreuzkirche" now) and the crossing of Sodingerstrasse, running to the east at that point, then turning into Wiescherstrasse; formerly independent settlements or villages like Baukau, Börnig, Crange, Horsthausen, Pöppinghausen, Sodingen, and others became the present Herne. These farms bearing these names were probably or possibly found in the 11th and 12th centuries. In 1860, the first of a number of coal mines started operating. In the following thirty years, the population increased twenty-fold. In 1975, Wanne-Eickel, by then a city with over 70,000 inhabitants, was incorporated into Herne, which had a population larger than "Wanne-Eickel" at that point in time.

== Population ==
Historical population

Year	Pop.	±% p.a.
1965	216,670	—
1970	202,623	−1.33%
1975	190,566	−1.22%
1980	182,553	−0.86%
1985	172,180	−1.16%
1990	178,132	+0.68%
1995	179,897	+0.20%

Year	Pop.	±% p.a.
2000	174,529	−0.60%
2005	170,992	−0.41%
2010	164,762	−0.74%
2015	155,851	−1.11%
2020	156,940	+0.14%
2025	156,266	−0.09%

Source: Landesdatabank Nordrhein-Westfalen

== Politics ==
=== Mayor ===
The current mayor of Herne is Frank Dudda of the Social Democratic Party (SPD), elected in 2015 and re-elected in 2020. The most recent mayoral election was held on 13 September 2020, and the results were as follows:

Candidate	Party	Votes	%
Frank Dudda	Social Democratic Party	30,758	63.4
Timon Radicke	Christian Democratic Union	8,685	17.9
Pascal Krüger	Alliance 90/The Greens	5,014	10.3
Daniel Kleibömer	The Left	2,026	4.2
Thomas Bloch	Free Democratic Party	2,025	4.2
Valid votes		48,508	98.0
Invalid votes		980	2.0
Total		49,488	100.0
Electorate/voter turnout		119,462	41.4
Source: State Returning Officer

=== City council ===
Results of the 2020 city council election

The Herne city council governs the city alongside the mayor. The most recent city council election was held on 13 September 2020, and the results were as follows:

Party	Votes	%	±	Seats	±
Social Democratic Party (SPD)	21,560	44.1	▼0.6	28	▼1
Christian Democratic Union (CDU)	9,775	20.0	▼5.9	12	▼3
Alliance 90/The Greens (Grüne)	7,723	15.8	▲6.5	10	▲4
Alternative for Germany (AfD)	4,127	8.4	▲4.3	5	▲3
The Left (Die Linke)	1,980	4.1	▼2.2	3	▼1
Free Democratic Party (FDP)	1,615	3.3	▲0.5	2	±0
Pirate Party Germany (Piraten)	767	1.6	▼1.1	1	▼1
Independent Citizens Herne (UB Herne)	804	1.6	0.0	1	±0
Voters' Association Wanne-Herne (WWH)	443	0.9	New	0	New
Independents	49	0.1	–	0	–
Valid votes	48,843	98.6			
Invalid votes	694	1.4			
Total	49, 537	100.0		62	▲2
Electorate/voter turnout	119,462	41.5	▼0.7		
Source: State Returning Officer

== Gallery ==
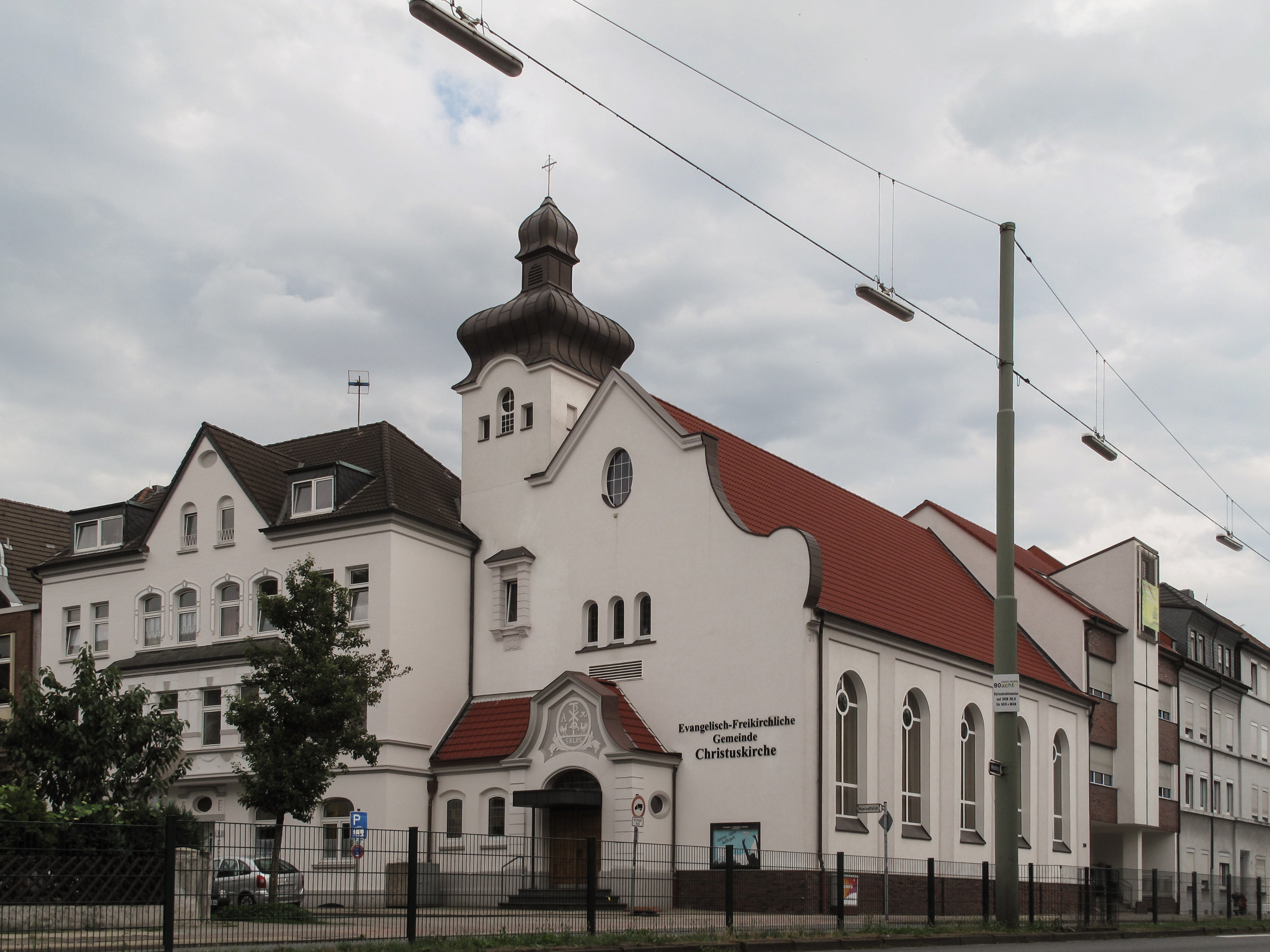
Herne, church

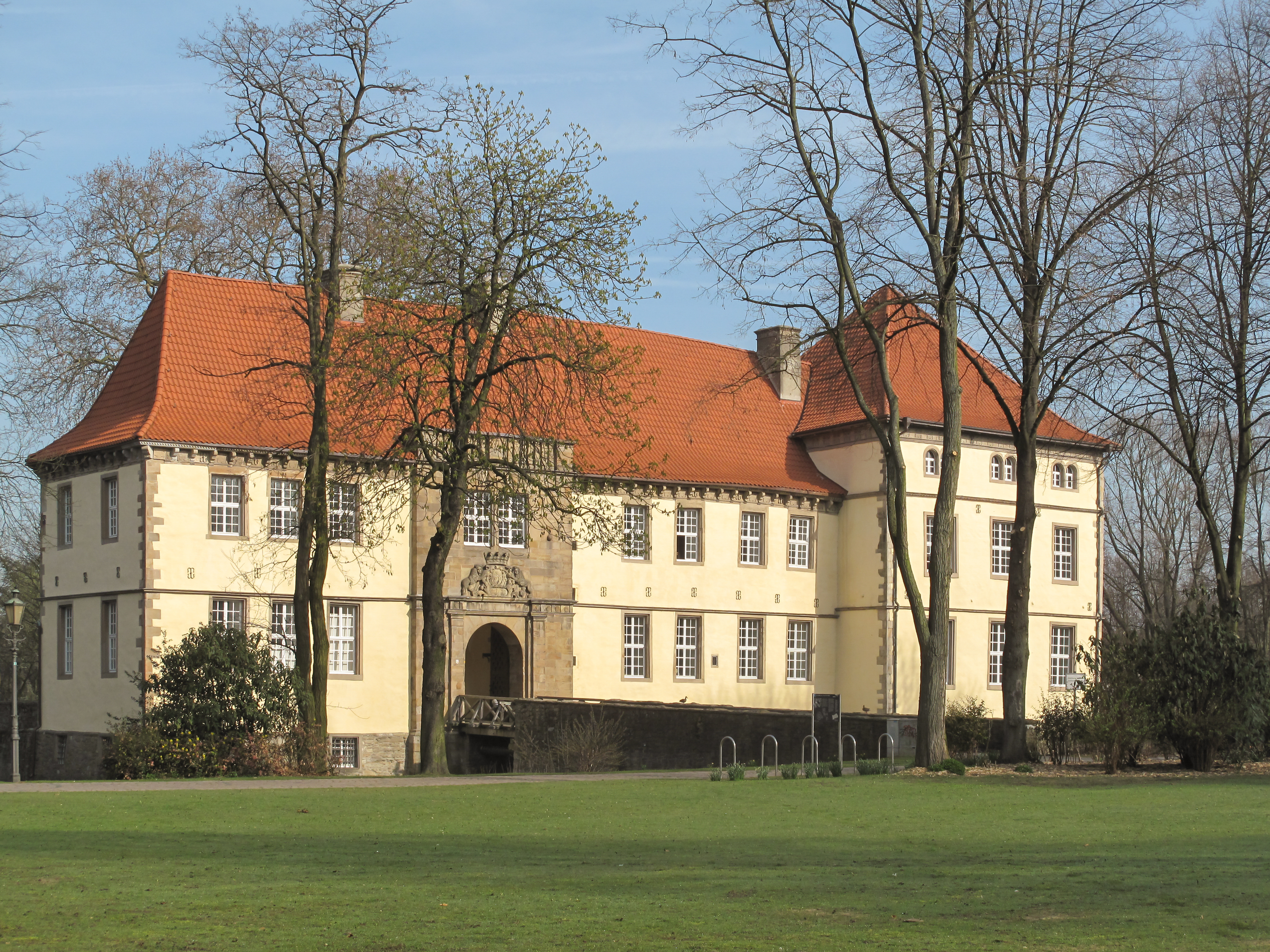
Baukau, castle: Schloss Strünkede

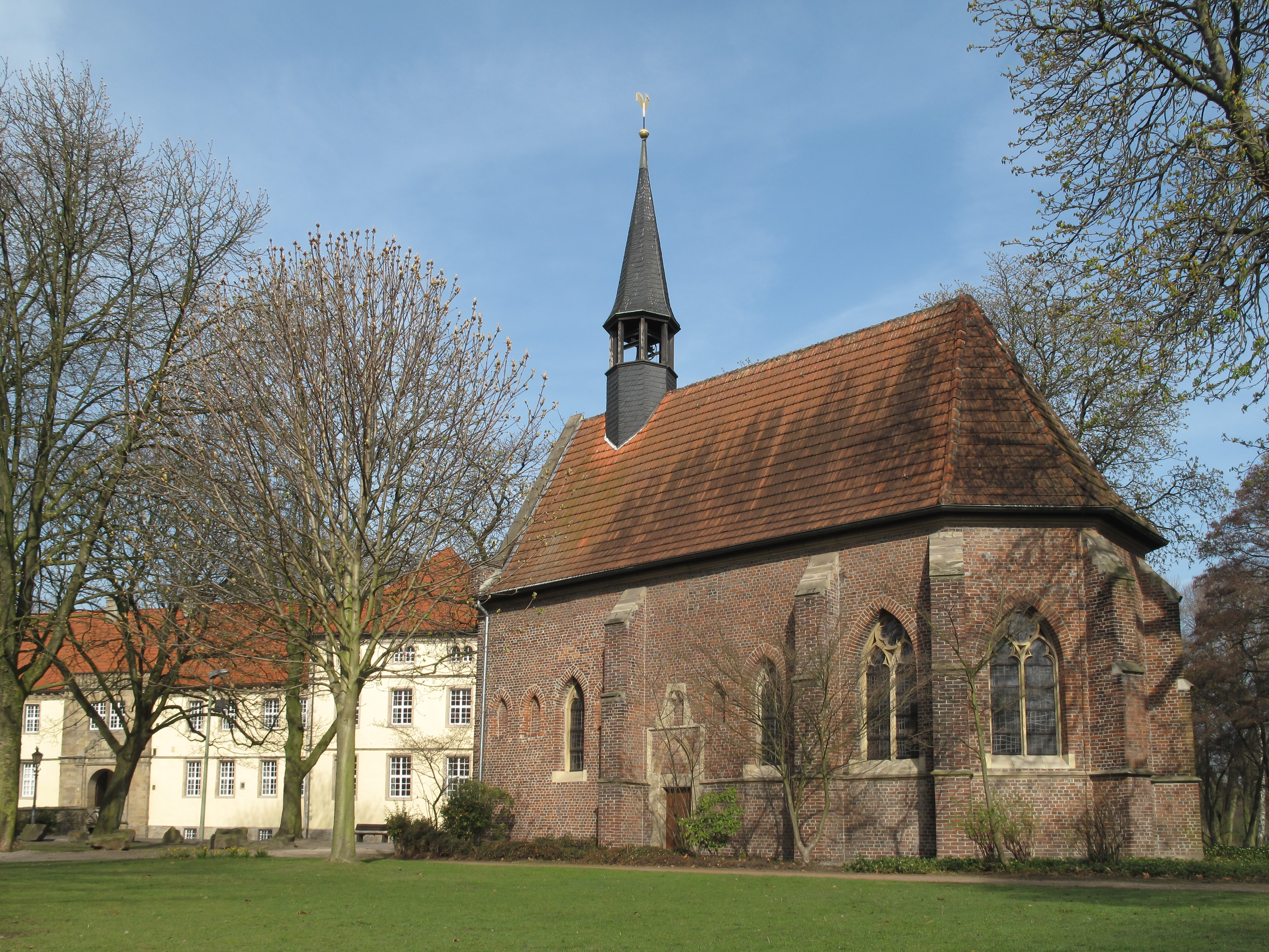
Baukau, chapel: Schlosskapelle Strünkede

The largest communities of migrants:

Turkey	10,130
Poland	2,139
Romania	1,865
Syria	1,140
Greece	1,066
Italy	792

== Notable places ==
A fair called Cranger Kirmes is held in the city's Crange district every first week of August. This is the second largest-carnival in Germany, with an average of around 4.5 million visitors. Its origins can be traced back to the 15th century, when farmers started trading horses on Saint Lawrence's Day. The horse show and horse equipment sales were arranged at the same place where horses were traded years ago for tradition.

== Notable people ==
Famous Hernians or Wanne-Eickelians include:

- Cigdem Akyol
- Yıldıray Baştürk
- Kurt Edelhagen
- Gudrun Heute-Bluhm
- Andrea Jürgens
- Jürgen von Manger, known as "Mr. Tegtmeier", Tegtmeiers Reisen
- Jürgen Marcus
- Bernd Storck
- Peavy Wagner
- Leonie Saint
- Bärbel Beuermann
- Gregor Willmes, musicologist
- Rudolf Witzig
- Jan Zweyer

== Notable businesses ==
Major industrial employers in Herne are Schwing (manufacturer of concrete pumps), Vulkan (couplings and connections for refrigeration and air conditioning) and the construction company Heitkamp.

Herne is the location of two renowned hospitals of supraregional importance, the Rheumazentrum Ruhrgebiet, a specialized rheumatology clinic that includes a center for rare diseases, and the Urology Clinic at the Marien-Hospital, recognized as a leading center for tumor therapy, neuro-urology, urogynecology, andrology, and incontinence treatment. Both clinics are affiliated with the Ruhr University Bochum.

== Sports ==
Herne is home to several football clubs, including SC Westfalia Herne, DSC Wanne-Eickel and SV Sodingen. The city's soccer tradition is closely linked to the mining industry. The clubs celebrated their greatest successes in the 1950s.

== Sister cities ==
Herne is twinned with:

- Hénin-Beaumont, France (1954)
- Castleford, England, United Kingdom (1956)
- Altagracia, Nicaragua (1988)
- Moyogalpa, Nicaragua (1988)
- Belgorod, Russia (1990)
- Eisleben, Germany (1990)
- Konin, Poland (1991)
- Beşiktaş, Turkey (2016)
- Luzhou, China (2018)
