= 1996 North Dakota Attorney General election =

- November 5, 1996
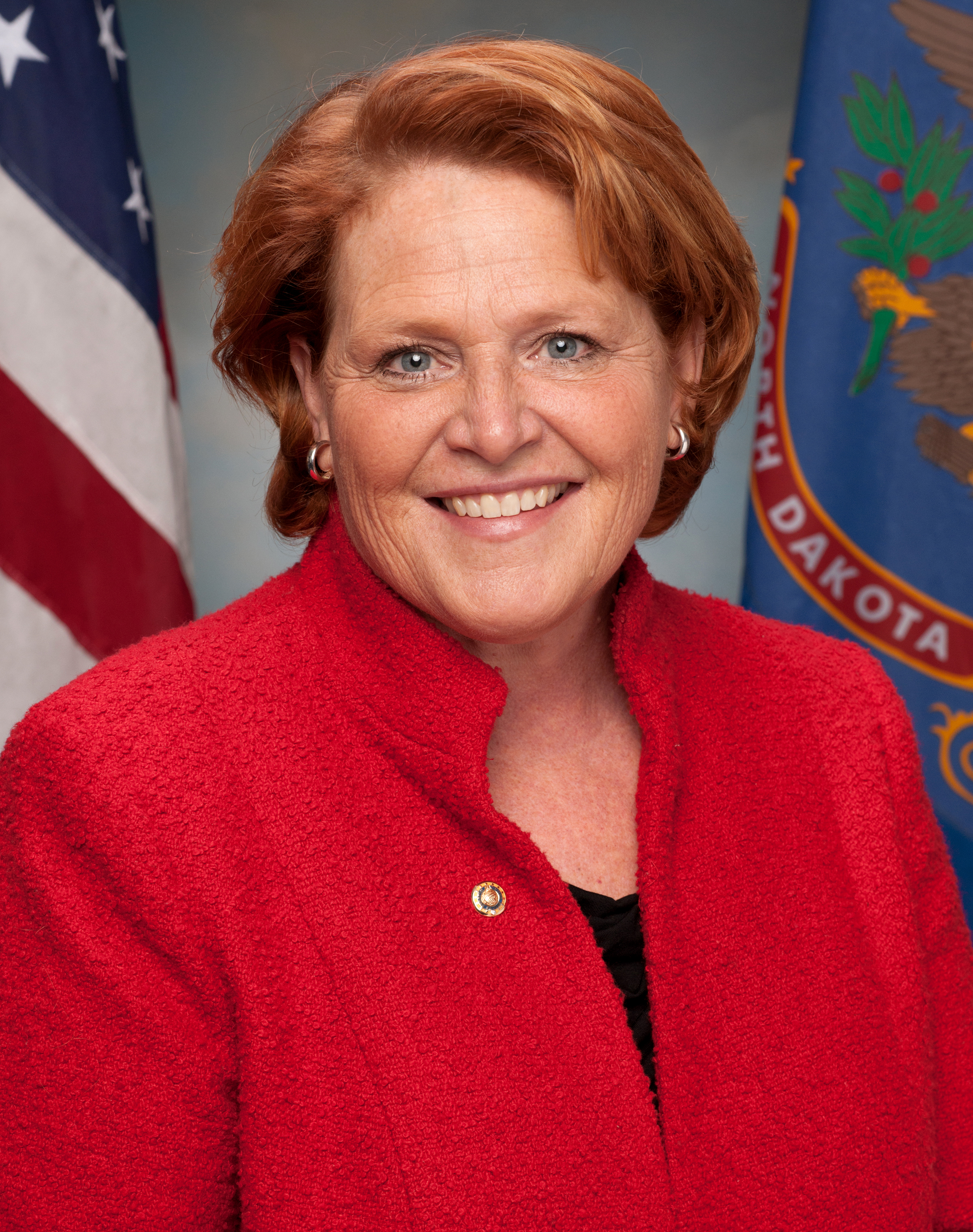

Nominee	Heidi Heitkamp	Ward K. Johnson
Party	Democratic–NPL	Republican
Popular vote	167,863	95,164
Percentage	63.82%	36.18%
- County results Heitkamp: 50–60% 60–70% 70–80% 80–90%
Attorney General before election
Heidi Heitkamp
Democratic–NPL
Elected Attorney General
Heidi Heitkamp
Democratic–NPL

The 1996 North Dakota Attorney General election was held on November 5, 1996, to elect the North Dakota Attorney General. Democratic-NPL incumbent Heidi Heitkamp won re-election to a second term in a landslide, defeating Republican attorney Ward K. Johnson by twenty-seven percentage points and winning all counties in the state.

As of 2026, this is the last time a Democrat has been elected North Dakota Attorney General.

== Democratic primary ==
=== Candidates ===
- Heidi Heitkamp, North Dakota Attorney General (1992–2000)

=== Results ===
Democratic–NPL primary results
Party	Candidate	Votes	%
Democratic–NPL	Heidi Heitkamp	48,184	100.00%
Total votes		48,184	100.00%

== Republican primary ==
=== Candidates ===
- Ward K. Johnson, attorney

=== Results ===
Republican primary results
Party	Candidate	Votes	%
Republican	Ward K. Johnson	43,679	100.00%
Total votes		43,679	100.00%

== General election ==
=== Candidates ===
- Heidi Heitkamp, North Dakota Attorney General (1992–2000) (Democratic-NPL)
- Ward K. Johnson, attorney (Republican)

=== Results ===
1996 North Dakota Attorney General election results
Party	Candidate	Votes	%	±%
Democratic–NPL	Heidi Heitkamp	167,863	63.82%	+1.45%
Republican	Ward K. Johnson	95,164	36.18%	−1.45%
Total votes		263,027	100.00%	
Democratic–NPL hold				
