= 1992 North Dakota Attorney General election =

- November 3, 1992
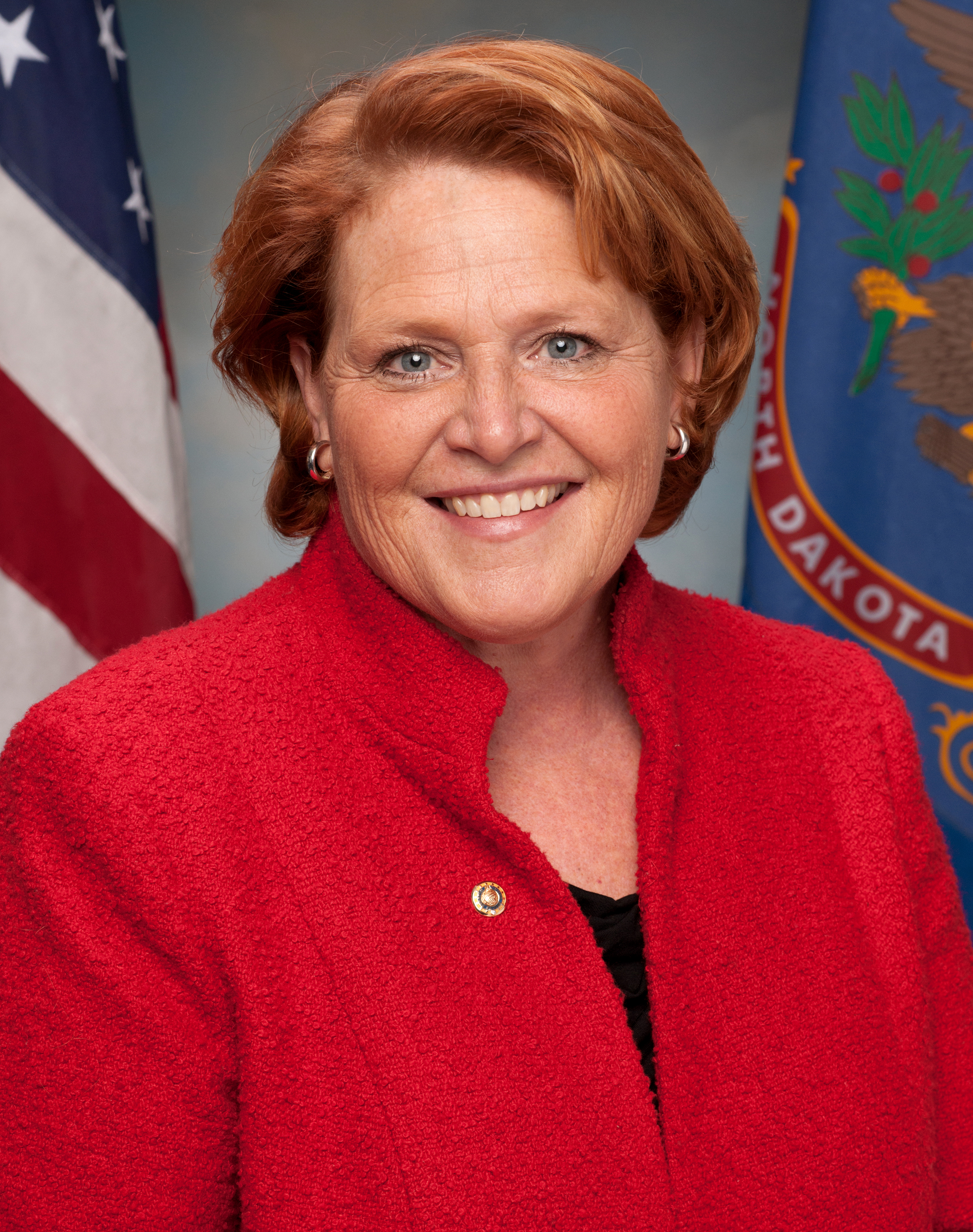

Nominee	Heidi Heitkamp	Warren Albrecht
Party	Democratic–NPL	Republican
Popular vote	186,606	112,562
Percentage	62.37%	37.63%
- County results Heitkamp: 50–60% 60–70% 70–80% Albrecht: 50–60%
Attorney General before election
Nicholas Spaeth
Democratic–NPL
Elected Attorney General
Heidi Heitkamp
Democratic–NPL

The 1992 North Dakota Attorney General election was held on November 3, 1992, to elect the North Dakota Attorney General. Democratic-NPL incumbent Nicholas Spaeth chose not to seek re-election to a third term, instead unsuccessfully running for governor. Democratic-NPL nominee and North Dakota Tax Commissioner Heidi Heitkamp won the election in a landslide, defeating Republican attorney Warren Albrecht by twenty-four percentage points and winning every single county except for McIntosh.

== Democratic primary ==
=== Candidates ===
- Heidi Heitkamp, North Dakota Tax Commissioner (1986–1992)

=== Results ===
Democratic–NPL primary results
Party	Candidate	Votes	%
Democratic–NPL	Heidi Heitkamp	65,352	100.00%
Total votes		65,352	100.00%

== Republican primary ==
=== Candidates ===
- Warren Albrecht, attorney

=== Results ===
Republican primary results
Party	Candidate	Votes	%
Republican	Warren Albrecht	42,962	100.00%
Total votes		42,962	100.00%

== General election ==
=== Candidates ===
- Heidi Heitkamp, North Dakota Tax Commissioner (1986–1992) (Democratic-NPL)
- Warren Albrecht, attorney (Republican)

=== Results ===
1992 North Dakota Attorney General election results
Party	Candidate	Votes	%	±%
Democratic–NPL	Heidi Heitkamp	186,606	62.37%	−10.90%
Republican	Warren Albrecht	112,562	37.63%	+10.90%
Total votes		299,168	100.00%	
Democratic–NPL hold				
