= The Ed Schultz Show =

US radio program

- Genre: Progressive talk radio
- Running time: 3 hours (12–3 p.m. Eastern)
- Country of origin: United States
- Language: English
- Home station: KFGO (2004–2006, 2007–2009); KQWB (2006–2007); WWRL (2009–2014)
- Syndicates: Jones Radio Networks
- Hosted by: Ed Schultz
- Recording studio: New York City
- Original release: January 5, 2004 – May 23, 2014
- Opening theme: "Sweet Child o' Mine"
- Other themes: "Turn Up the Radio"

The Ed Schultz Show was a progressive talk radio program hosted by Ed Schultz. It was formerly broadcast from KFGO in Fargo, North Dakota. It was heard on a network of over 100 stations, including seven of the ten largest radio markets. It was also on XM and Sirius satellite radio.

Schultz's radio show moved to New York City in May 2009, a relocation brought on by the launch of his new television show, The Ed Show, on MSNBC.

== History ==
Schultz launched The Ed Schultz Show on January 5, 2004. Created and financed by Democracy Radio and distributed by Jones Radio Networks, the show started in two markets (Needles, California and Langdon, North Dakota) and quickly grew, signing another dozen stations in smaller, mostly upper Midwest markets. For a while, Schultz continued his News and Views broadcasts, though by February 2005 it was announced that Joel Heitkamp, a North Dakota state senator, was taking over that show. On February 1, 2007, Ed Schultz returned to hosting the News and Views show.

After growing to approximately 95 affiliates, Democracy Radio sold its majority stake in The Ed Schultz Show to Product First in June 2005, a company started by Randy Michaels and Stu Krane, who had previously been involved with launching Rush Limbaugh's radio show. Distribution continued with Jones Radio Networks and subsequently by its successor, Dial Global.

Schultz's flagship KFGO dropped The Ed Schultz Show between January 2006 and February 2007 due to an apparent conflict with the station's management which new ownership cleared up. Fargo's KQWB aired the program in the interim.

In 2009, Talkers magazine rated Ed Schultz as the 18th most important talk show host in the United States.

During his show on May 24, 2011, Schultz called Laura Ingraham both a "right-wing slut" and a "talk slut". Feminist organizations, including the Women's Media Center, called for his suspension. The following day he issued an apology, saying he "used vile and inappropriate language when talking about talk show host Laura Ingraham. I am deeply sorry, and I apologize. It was wrong, uncalled for and I recognize the severity of what I said. I apologize to you, Laura, and ask for your forgiveness," and offering an indefinite self-suspension without pay. MSNBC issued a statement saying that it had accepted Schultz's offer to take one week of unpaid leave.

In May 2014, Schultz announced he was replacing his three-hour weekday radio program with a one-hour program, and shifting to a Web format. Schultz continued to host his Ed Show television program, which was then aired on weekdays at 5 p.m. ET.

== Show features ==
Ed Schultz may be best known for his pro-labor reputation, because he was one of the few remaining pundits who still frequently featured labor issues and promoted the labor movement, associating the health of "labor" with the health of the middle class.

Ed Schultz often brought Los Angeles lawyer Norman Goldman to his show for legal analysis, thus given the title of "Senior Legal Analyst" by Schultz. Goldman filled in on the radio show when Schultz was traveling or on vacation. Reliably holding Schultz's high ratings, Goldman now produces his own nationally heard talk show during the 3-6 PM West Coast time slot. Tony Trupiano also filled in on Schultz's show when Schultz was absent.

The third hour of every Friday show was dedicated to "recession busting" where small business owners called in to promote their business for the hour.

Like other popular polemic, political radio shows, Schultz used humorous, often somewhat derogatory nicknames for a number of public figures. These included "Slant Head" for conservative commentator Sean Hannity, "the Druggie" or "the Drugster" for Rush Limbaugh, "Shooter" for Vice President Dick Cheney, "Rotten Rudy" for former Republican presidential candidate Rudy Giuliani, "The Mittster" for Mitt Romney, and "the pizza man" for Herman Cain. Schultz himself was perhaps best known by the nicknames "Big Eddie", and the "Big RedHead"

== See also ==
- Jones Radio Network - syndicators of The Ed Schultz Show
- Sirius XM Left - XM radio channel 127
