= News and Views =

News and Views may refer to:

- News and Views (1948–1951), an early TV news program
- News and Views, a talk radio program in Fargo, North Dakota
- "News and Views", a slogan for HLN (TV channel)
