= Tegtmeiers Reisen =

- Starring: Jürgen von Manger
- Country of origin: Germany
- No. of episodes: 20

Original release
- Release: July 1972 – July 1980

Tegtmeiers Reisen (“Tegtmeier's Travels”) is a 20 episode German television series (from 1972 until 1980 in ZDF) that featured two travelers, Adolf Tegtmeier and Dr. Tegtmeier, that would explore various countries. The first episode („Die Gelsenkirchener Odyssee“) was about Greece, the last one („Olala“) was about Paris.

== See also ==
- List of German television series
