= Jim Dotzenrod =

American politician

Member of the North Dakota Senate from the 26th district
- In office January 2009 – January 2021
- Preceded by: Joel Heitkamp
- Succeeded by: Jason Heitkamp

Personal details
- Born: December 4, 1946 (age 79) Breckenridge, Minnesota, U.S.
- Party: Democratic
- Education: North Dakota State University (BS)

James Allen Dotzenrod (born December 4, 1946) is an American politician. He is a member of the North Dakota Senate from the 26th District, serving since 2009. He is a member of the North Dakota Democratic-Nonpartisan League Party. He also served in the Senate from 1978 to 1994.

Party political offices
Preceded by Ryan Taylor	Democratic nominee for North Dakota Agriculture Commissioner; 2018	Succeeded by Fintan L. Dooley
