= Cranger Kirmes =

Funfair in Germany

Coordinates: 51°32′40″N 7°9′48″E

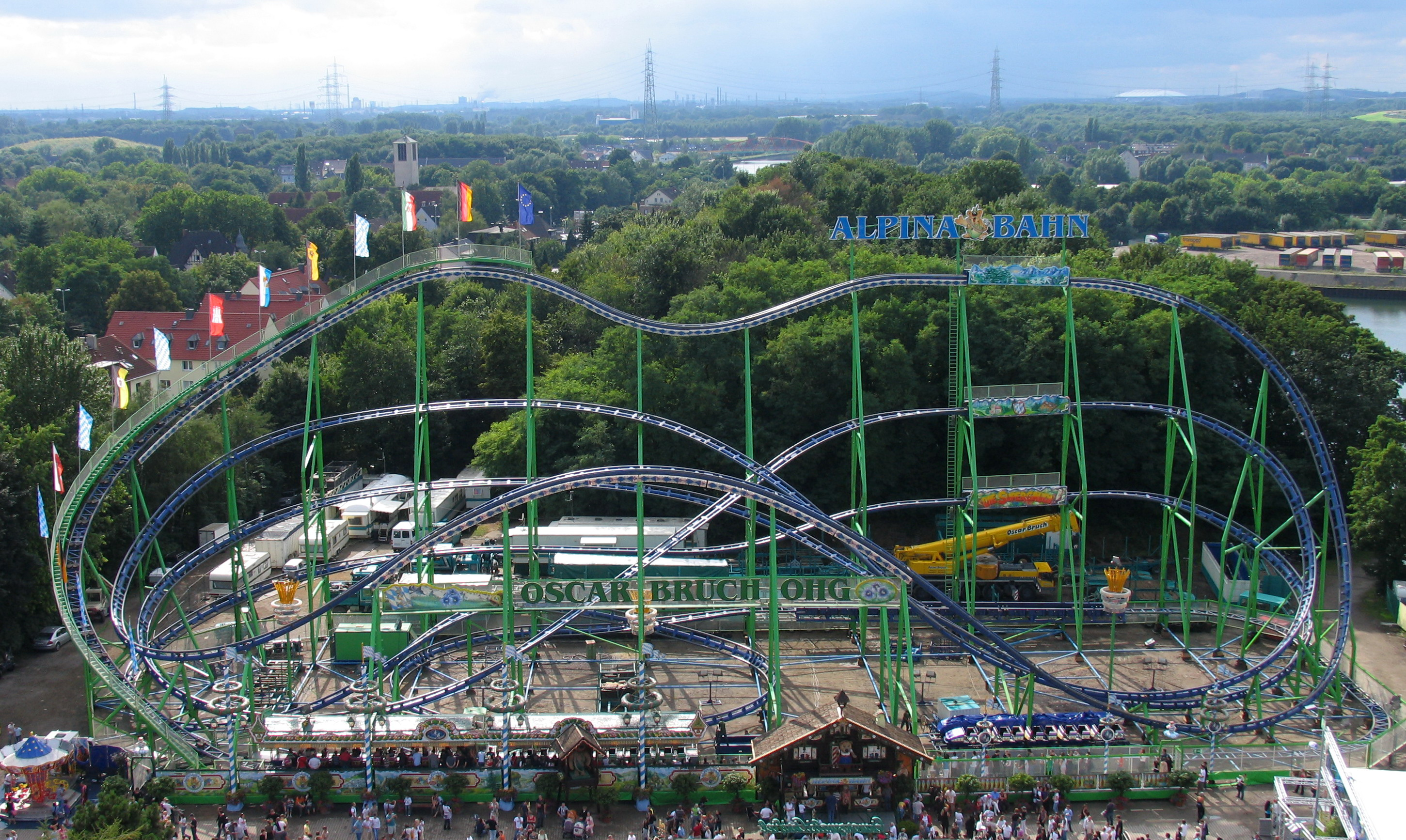
Roller coaster Alpina Bahn at Cranger Kirmes 2008

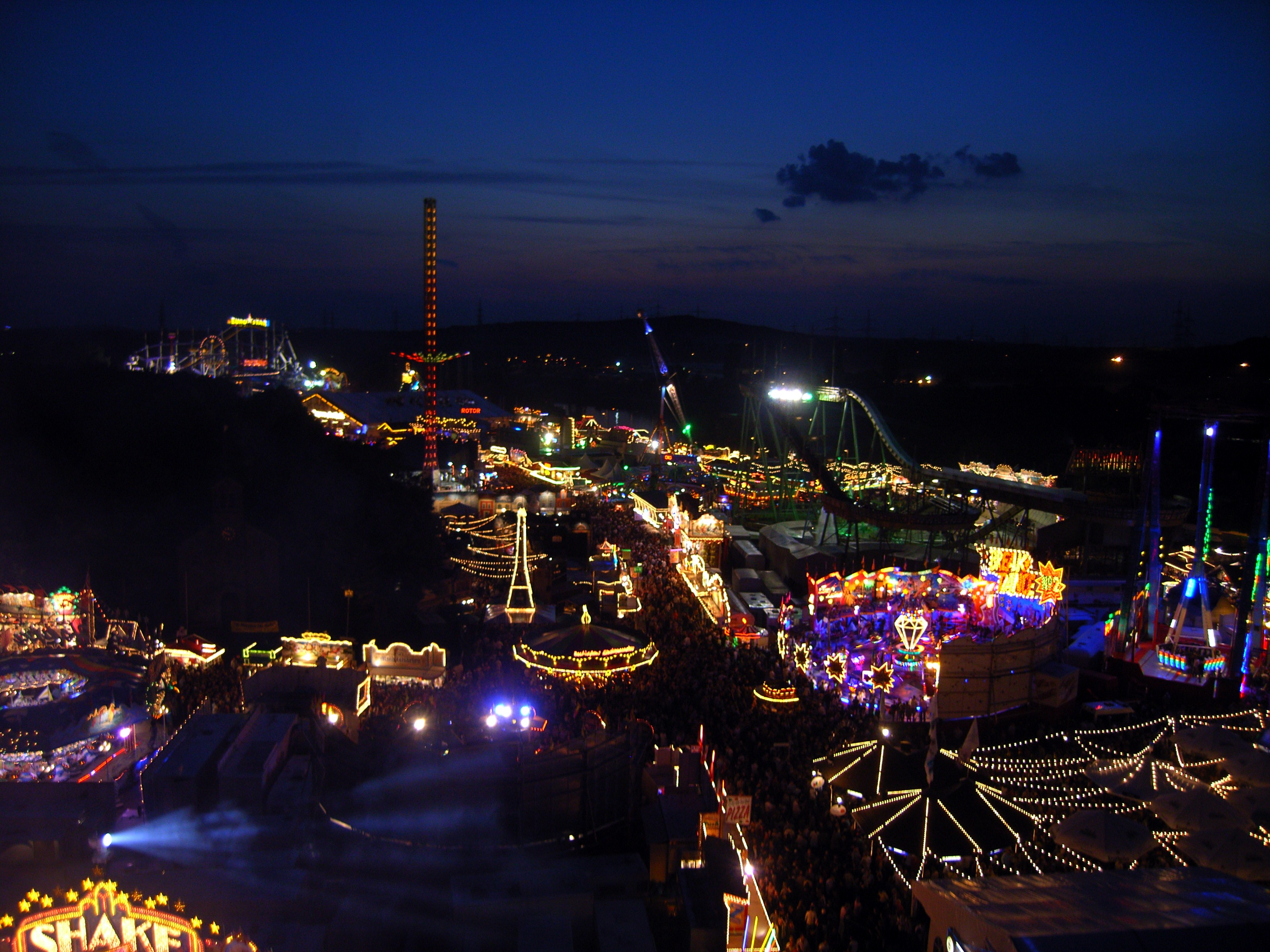
View from a ferris wheel at the 572nd Cranger Kirmes in 2007

The Cranger Kirmes is a funfair in Germany, located near the Rhine–Herne Canal in Crange in the city of Herne located in the Ruhr Region. It is the biggest funfair in the state of North Rhine-Westphalia and the second biggest fair in Germany, only behind the Munich Oktoberfest. In 2008 there were 4.7 million visitors. At an area of only 110,000 square metres (1,200,000 sq ft) and 500 show businesses it is called the "most overcrowded fair of the world".

The fair is held annually for a period of 11 days from the Thursday before the first Friday in August. Visitor attractions include Ferris wheels, carousels, roller coasters, ghost trains, carnival games, food stalls, raffles and beer halls and gardens. On the first Friday, the day of the opening ceremonay, and on the closing day a fireworks show is presented starting at 10.30 pm.

== History ==
The exact year of the first fair is unknown. During the 15th century a market to sell wild horses from the nearby riparian forests of the Emscher was established in Crange to be held around Saint Lawrence's Day, 10 August. Over the years, dancers, prestidigitators, jugglers, fortune tellers, magicians and carnies joined and gradually outnumbered the horse dealers. When industrialisation and mining in the Ruhr district led to a substantial population increase in the area, annual visitor numbers to the Cranger Kirmes grew to about 4 million now. The horse market of the Cranger Kirmes takes place each year on the Thursday before the fair.

Due to COVID-19 restrictions, there was no fair in 2020.
