= Alice K. Olson =

American lawyer, activist, and politician (born 1945)

Alice Olson
- Born: Alice Ann Katherine Kinsella; December 19, 1945 (age 80); Bloomington, Illinois, U.S.
- Education: Moorhead State University; University of North Dakota
- Occupations: Lawyer; activist; politician
- Political party: Democratic (D-NPL)
- Spouse: Michael Olson
- Children: 2

Alice Kinsella Olson (born December 19, 1945) is an American lawyer, activist, and politician. She was the unsuccessful Democratic nominee for North Dakota Attorney General in 1980 and North Dakota Labor Commissioner in 1982.

Party political offices
Preceded by Kent Johanneson	Democratic-NPL nominee for North Dakota Attorney General; 1980	Succeeded by Nicholas Spaeth
Preceded by	Democratic-NPL nominee for North Dakota Labor Commissioner; 1982	Succeeded by Byron Knutson
