= Ed Schultz =

American political commentator

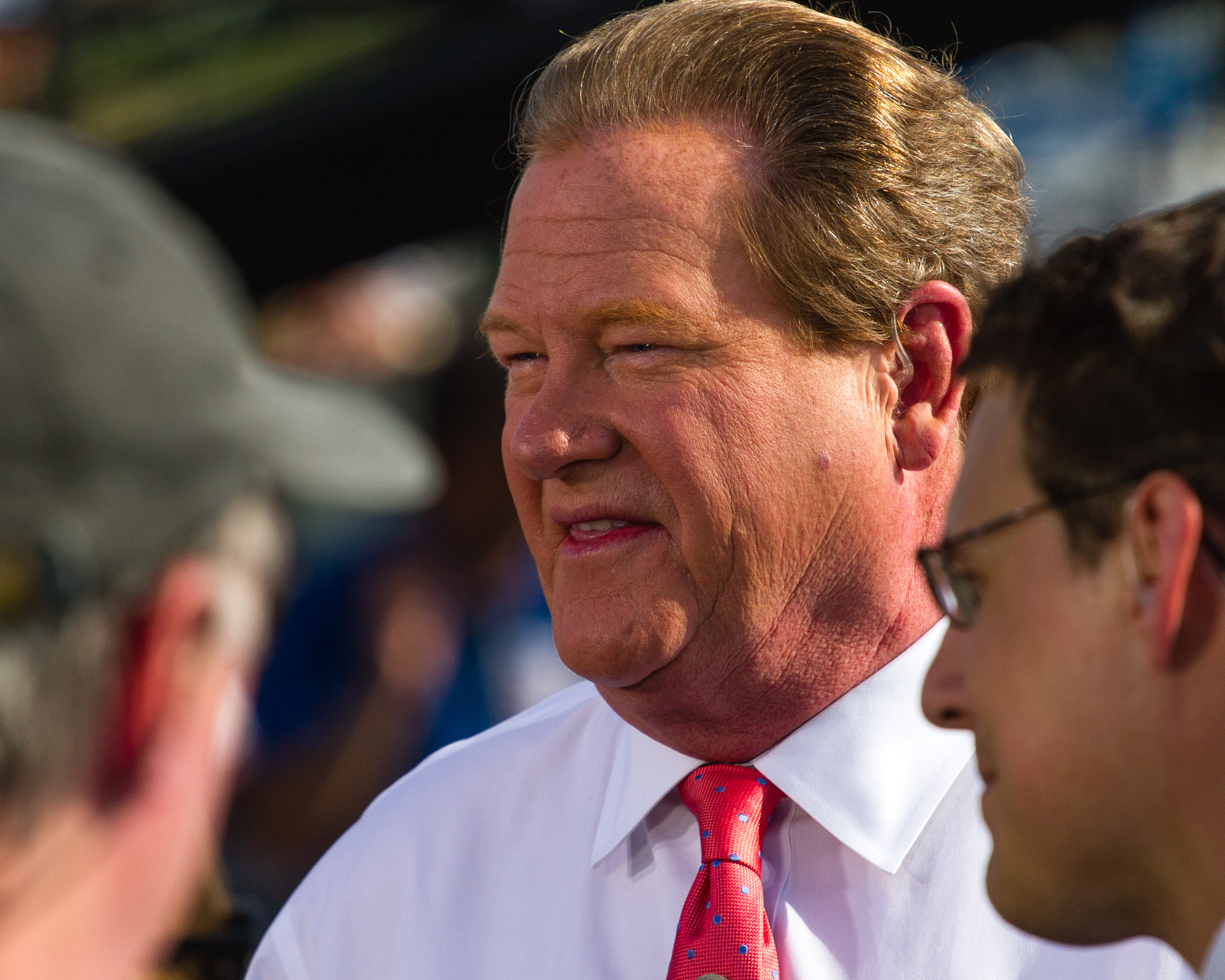
- Schultz in May 2015
- Born: Edward Andrew Schultz; January 27, 1954; Norfolk, Virginia, U.S.
- Died: July 5, 2018 (aged 64); Washington, D.C., U.S.
- Education: Minnesota State University Moorhead
- Occupations: Talk radio and television host; political commentator; author
- Years active: 1980–2018
- Notable credit(s): News with Ed Schultz; Ed Schultz News and Commentary; The Ed Schultz Show; The Ed Show
- Political party: Democratic
- Spouses: Maureen Zimmerman (m. 1993) Wendy Noack (m. 1998)
- Children: 6
- Awards: Three Eric Sevareid Awards, and as leader of a broadcast team – two Marconis and one Peabody Award
- Website: The Ed Schultz Show; The Ring of Fire Network

Edward Andrew Schultz (January 27, 1954 – July 5, 2018) was an American television and radio host, political commentator, news anchor and sports broadcaster.

He was the host of The Ed Show, a weekday news talk program on MSNBC from 2009 to 2015, and The Ed Schultz Show, a talk radio show, nationally syndicated by Dial Global from 2004 to 2014. The radio show ended on May 23, 2014, and was replaced by a one-hour podcast, Ed Schultz News and Commentary, which ran from 2015 until his death. Schultz also hosted a daily primetime weekday show, News with Ed Schultz, on the now-closed RT America TV channel based in Washington, D.C., that was part of the RT network.

== Early life ==
Schultz was born in Norfolk, Virginia, and grew up in the Larchmont area near Old Dominion University, the son of George Schultz, an aeronautical engineer, and Mary Schultz, an English teacher. He attended Larchmont Elementary School, Blair Junior High, and graduated in 1972 from Maury High School in Norfolk.

He moved to Minnesota to play football on a scholarship from Minnesota State University Moorhead. He made All-American and became the NAIA passing leader in 1977 and signed as a free agent with the Oakland Raiders. In 1979, Schultz tried out for the Winnipeg Blue Bombers of the Canadian Football League.

== Broadcasting career ==
=== Sportscasting ===
After his football career, he worked as a sportscaster in Fargo, North Dakota, for two local stations, first KTHI-TV (now KVLY-TV) then on WDAY-TV beginning 1983. Schultz anchored nightly sports broadcasts at WDAY-TV and starting in 1982 did radio play-by-play of North Dakota State University (NDSU) football games. Management asked Schultz to take some time off after an incident in which Schultz exited the broadcast booth to look for a North Dakota State fan who threw a bottle of Southern Comfort through the booth window.

Schultz, who was touted as the "Voice of the Bison" for many years at WDAY, left in 1996 and began broadcasting for KFGO in Fargo, doing play-by-play work on University of North Dakota (UND) Fighting Hawks football broadcasts beginning in 1998. Schultz left as UND play-by-play man in 2003 to focus on his national radio show.

=== Talk radio ===
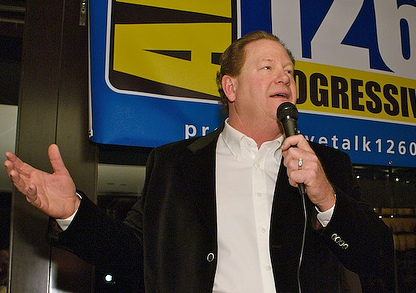
Schultz in Washington, D.C. in January 2007

In 1992, Schultz became a conservative political talk show host on WDAY. In 1996, Schultz moved to KFGO. Schultz's News and Views radio show quickly grew into a regional broadcast stretching from South Dakota to Minnesota. His political views leaned towards the right during the early years, and Schultz told the Los Angeles Times that he "lined up with the Republicans because they were anti-tax and I wanted to make a lot of money." His political views became more liberal after he visited a Salvation Army cafeteria in 1998 and later took his radio show on the road riding in a 38-foot motorhome. Throughout the tour, Schultz visited families in rural North Dakota and described his tour as "the on-the-job experience that have changed my thinking as to where we're going as a country."

Schultz pondered a run as a Republican for the United States House of Representatives against Democratic Representative Earl Pomeroy in 1994, but decided against it after visiting with state Republican leaders.

In 2005, Schultz began a nationally syndicated radio show with a liberal-leaning perspective; the expansion was funded by the New York-based nonprofit called Democracy Radio. The Ed Schultz Show was broadcast from the Fargo, North Dakota, studios of KFGO via the Jones Radio Networks to over 100 radio stations as of 2005. The show was syndicated by Dial Global, and could be heard nationwide on Sirius Satellite Radio's "SIRIUS Left" channel, and XM Satellite Radio's America Left channel. The program was also heard on Armed Forces Radio. Schultz's radio show moved to New York City in May 2009, a relocation brought on by his new television show at MSNBC.

Schultz interviewed guests and often featured Norman Goldman as "Senior Legal Analyst" when issues of law were discussed. Goldman was a frequent substitute host because he maintained high ratings for Schultz's show. Goldman's popularity made it a natural step for him to host his own national talk show. Norman Goldman, a Los Angeles lawyer, describes himself as "fiercely independent" and continues to acknowledge Schultz's mentoring. Goldman ended his show in 2019.

According to a 2008 survey done by Talkers magazine, Schultz ranked #17 nationally, with a weekly audience of more than 3 million listeners. On November 30, 2006, Schultz announced he was moving to the "prime real estate" time slot from noon to 3 p.m. Eastern Time, to compete directly with Rush Limbaugh, whose show is broadcast in that time slot.

During his show on May 24, 2011, Schultz called Laura Ingraham both a "right-wing slut" and a "talk slut." Feminist organizations, including the Women's Media Center, called for his suspension. The following day he issued an apology by saying he "used vile and inappropriate language when talking about talk show host Laura Ingraham. I am deeply sorry, and I apologize. It was wrong, uncalled for and I recognize the severity of what I said. I apologize to you, Laura, and ask for your forgiveness." He offered an indefinite self-suspension without pay. Ingraham accepted his apology: "Ed Schultz said something about me on his show that was not all that nice, to say the least. It was pretty crude. He apologized, and I accept his apology. It seemed heartfelt, it seemed like he really wished he hadn't said it and I accept that apology." MSNBC issued a statement saying that it had accepted Schultz's offer to take one week of unpaid leave over the matter.

Schultz ended his radio show on May 23, 2014. He stated on MSNBC, "This change will give me more flexibility to be on the road, to do the kind of shows I want to do here for The Ed Show here on MSNBC. This is on me, you know. I just don't want to do a three-hour talk show anymore."

=== The Ed Show ===
On April 1, 2009, MSNBC announced the launch of The Ed Show, anchored by Schultz. The program replaced the 6 p.m. show 1600 Pennsylvania Avenue with David Shuster, who moved to the 3 p.m. to 5 p.m. slot. The Ed Show debuted at 6 p.m. on Monday, April 6, 2009. At the close of 2010, Schultz made The Nation's Progressive Honor Roll as the Most Valuable TV Voice and was deemed the "most populist of MSNBC's hosts".

On September 23, 2009, Schultz stated on-air that Republicans “want to see you dead” and “make money off your dead corpse.” In response, House Republicans called on MSNBC to condemn the segment and demanded an apology from Schultz.

After Keith Olbermann left MSNBC, The Ed Show moved to the 10 p.m. ET time slot on January 24, 2011, while The Last Word with Lawrence O'Donnell moved to Olbermann's old time slot.

On August 15, 2011, Schultz used an edited video clip of Texas Governor Rick Perry at a rally talking about the national debt crisis. Governor Perry said "getting America back to work is the most important issue that faces this country, being able to pay off $14.5 trillion or $16 trillion worth of debt. That big black cloud that hangs over America, that debt that is so monstrous." The audio of the clip was cut off after "America", so Schultz's audience did not hear "that debt that is so monstrous". Governor Perry refers to the debt before and after the "big black cloud" statement. Schultz said, "That black cloud Perry is talking about is President Barack Obama." The following day on his TV show Schultz apologized for taking Governor Perry out of context. "We did not present the full context of those statements and we should have ... No doubt about it, it was a mistake and we regret the error ... we should not have included it in our coverage."

On October 19, 2011, NBC announced that effective October 24, 2011, The Ed Show would be moving to the 8 p.m. Eastern slot, with The Last Word with Lawrence O'Donnell returning to the 10 p.m. slot. On March 9, 2012, Politico reported that Schultz had received nearly $200,000 in speaking fees and advertisement charges from labor unions without publicly disclosing this income, a potential conflict of interest for his television show, which is billed as a news program.

In April 2011, NBC News producer and sound engineer Michael Queen sued Schultz, claiming Schultz should have compensated him for helping him get a TV show on MSNBC. Schultz argued there was no such agreement with Queen, and countersued Queen. On April 30, 2012, Washington federal district court Judge Beryl A. Howell issued a summary judgment that neither party owed anything to the other party. On April 4, 2014, the United States Court of Appeals for the District of Columbia Circuit overturned part of that judgment, saying that Queen's claim of breach of partnership duties presented a "genuine issue of material fact" that deserved to be heard by a jury. At trial, Schultz won.

Schultz left his nightly 8 p.m. ET show to host a twice-a-week MSNBC show on weekends from 5 p.m. to 6 p.m. ET, beginning April 2013. The 8 p.m. weekdays time slot was taken over on April 1, 2013, with All In with Chris Hayes. Effective August 26, 2013, The Ed Show moved back to weekdays at 5 p.m. ET.

On July 30, 2015, MSNBC President Phil Griffin announced that the series had been cancelled in an effort to transition to news reporting. The program aired its final episode on July 31, 2015, without Schultz being present.

=== Allegations of political bias at MSNBC and subsequent firing ===
In an interview with National Review's Jamie Weinstein. since redacted on their website, (Note: The interview has since been redacted on the National Review website. (See Episode 55: Ed Schultz. National Review April 13, 2018. Accessed March 9, 2019. Archived at WayBack Machine on 2018-04-14.)) Schultz stated that he had prepared a report on Bernie Sanders' presidential candidate announcement at his home, but five minutes before the broadcast was due to air, he was angrily told by then-president of MSNBC Phil Griffin that "you're not covering this" and "you're not covering Bernie Sanders". Schultz stated that he objected to the prohibition because he felt the topic of a presidential candidate announcement was relevant, but was told not to cover the announcement, and that he would be covering press conferences in Texas and Baltimore which had already been outlined, which Schultz referred to as "totally meaningless".

=== Ed Schultz News and Commentary ===
After cancellation on MSNBC, Schultz did a half-hour podcast every weekday commenting on news and issues. His platform was much more mobile and able to take his show to the streets among those people whom he supported in the labor movement.

=== News with Ed Schultz ===
On January 14, 2016, Ed Schultz announced he would start hosting News with Ed Schultz on RT America, with the debut show occurring 11 days later. According to The Washington Post, in his new position with the Russian Federation-sponsored network he reversed several previously held positions; for example, he expressed newfound praise for Donald Trump and Vladimir Putin.

== Political views ==
In the late 1990s, Schultz stated that a series of events changed his political views from the right of the political spectrum to left of the spectrum. One event was his mother's battle with Alzheimer's disease, which began a long, slow decline of her mental health. Schultz found it frustrating trying to get her the services that she needed. Another was that he met, and eventually married, a psychiatric nurse named Wendy, who ran a homeless shelter in Fargo, North Dakota. He attributed much of his political change to her. Although he had criticized the homeless on his show, he said in his book that she helped to humanize them and he reportedly found that some of the people he had insulted were veterans, unable to get the psychiatric or medical services that might help them. He says that was the moment he began to look at poverty differently.

He became a Democrat in 2000, marking the formal turn in his politics from conservative to liberal. He began to hold events to raise money for people in the heartland who were going through tough times. Schultz considered running for the Democratic-NPL party nomination for governor of North Dakota against incumbent Republican John Hoeven in 2004, but decided to continue his more lucrative career in radio. Schultz subsequently declared himself a "lefty" and centered a large portion of his radio show on the "plight of working Americans". He stated that he and his sons were gun owners, although he supported some gun control measures. Regarding abortion, he was quoted as stating: "Now, as far as abortion is concerned, in my heart I'm a Christian. I'm against it. But we're livin' in a country where the majority rule and I'm not, as a talk show host, overturning Roe v. Wade."

In the 2016 presidential election, Schultz endorsed U.S. Senator Bernie Sanders for President of the United States.

== Personal life and death ==
Schultz was married twice, first to Maureen Zimmerman, in a marriage that ended in divorce, and then to Wendy Noack in 1998. He had a son and five stepchildren.

Schultz died at his home in Washington on July 5, 2018, aged 64. He had a history of heart problems.

== Bibliography ==
- Straight Talk from the Heartland: Tough Talk, Common Sense, and Hope from a Former Conservative (2004); ISBN 0-06-078457-1
- Killer Politics: How Big Money and Bad Politics Are Destroying the Great American Middle Class (2010); ISBN 1-4013-2378-2

== See also ==
- Progressive talk radio
