= Norman Goldman =

Attorney and talk radio host

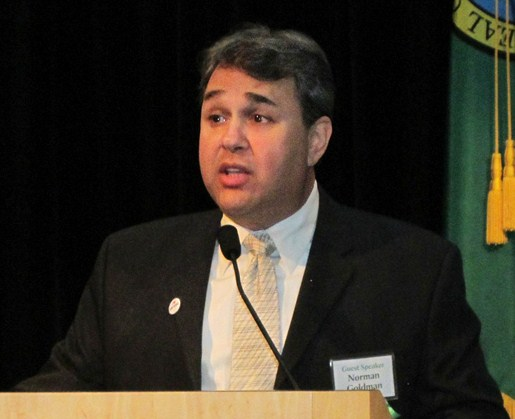
- Goldman speaking in 2011
- Born: Norman Maurice Goldman; March 17, 1959 (age 66); United States
- Occupations: Attorney, radio show host

Norman Maurice Goldman (born March 17, 1959) is an American attorney and a former political talk radio host.

Goldman first broadcast nationally as a fill-in host for The Ed Schultz Show in 2006, as well as creating colorful segments as the show's Senior Legal Analyst. He began hosting his own radio show in 2009, syndicated by Compass Media Networks. Goldman ended the show in 2019.

== Higher education ==
Goldman graduated from Hunter College of CUNY with a B.A. degree in political science. He then attended and graduated from law school on a full scholarship at Loyola Law School of Los Angeles. He passed the California Bar Exam at age 26.

== Legal career ==
Goldman was the plaintiff's attorney in Krumme vs. Mercury, a 2002 lawsuit in California. Both the trial court and the California Court of Appeal found for the plaintiffs that the insurance companies were mislabelling agents as independent brokers. The court upheld damages and attorney's fees. An insurance industry journal has described the case as "infamous". Goldman also represented plaintiffs in a lawsuit filed in San Francisco Superior Court against Auto Insurance Specialists accusing the company of paying sales money to an insurer in exchange for commissions.

== The Norman Goldman Show ==
The Norman Goldman Show
- Genre: Talk radio, law
- Running time: 3 hours (3–6 p.m. Pacific)
- Country of origin: United States
- Language: English
- Syndicates: Compass Media Networks
- Hosted by: Norman Goldman
- Original release: September 8, 2009 – February 22, 2019
- Opening theme: "The Spirit of Radio" by Rush
- Website: normangoldman.com

He hosted his own Saturday morning talk show, The Norman Invasion, on KLSX (97.1) in Los Angeles in 2004. That show ran from July 17 to October 30, 2004. Goldman then became a legal commentator on The Ed Schultz Show. In the late summer of 2009, Goldman began broadcasting his own weekday program via internet broadcasting and podcast. The Norman Goldman Show broadcast live from 3-6 p.m. Pacific time. Goldman picked up several stations after Air America's 2010 demise, as Ron Reagan opted not to continue his 3-6 p.m. PT show after the network's closing. Based in Los Angeles, Goldman's national radio program was distributed by Compass Media Networks.

The program's motto was "Where justice is served", but on-air Norman also used the motto "The place where fierce independence is the norm", a pun on his first name. The show used the opening riff to Canadian rock band Rush's "The Spirit of Radio" as its intro.

Goldman created the "four point plan to save America", after chastising politicians such as President Barack Obama for betraying their campaign promises. It includes power-transparency; "a WikiLeaks for radio", and a grassroots quarterback for the coordinating/funding of the progressive message and viewpoint.

On February 5, 2019, Goldman announced his show was ending in a few weeks, claiming he "went broke". He admitted to spending $2 million of his own money over 9 years propping up the show. The last live show was February 22, 2019.
