= Nicholas Spaeth =

American politician

27th Attorney General of North Dakota
- In office January 1, 1985 – December 15, 1992
- Governor: George Sinner
- Preceded by: Robert Wefald
- Succeeded by: Heidi Heitkamp

Personal details
- Born: January 27, 1950 Mahnomen, Minnesota, U.S.
- Died: March 16, 2014 (aged 64) Fargo, North Dakota, U.S.
- Party: Democratic
- Education: Stanford University (BA, JD); New College, Oxford

Nicholas John Spaeth (January 27, 1950 – March 16, 2014) was the 27th Attorney General of North Dakota, serving from 1985 to 1992. He lost the 1992 North Dakota governor's race to Republican Ed Schafer.

Born in Mahnomen, Minnesota, Spaeth grew up in Valley City, Fargo, and Bismarck in North Dakota. He went to Stanford University, where he graduated with honors, and won a Rhodes Scholarship to New College, Oxford. After Oxford, he went to Stanford Law School, where he was managing editor of the law review.

After graduation, he clerked for United States Court of Appeals for the Eighth Circuit Judge Myron Bright and then for Supreme Court Justice Byron White.

In the November 1992 election for governor of North Dakota, Spaeth lost to Ed Schafer, 58% to 41%. In 2004, Spaeth joined H&R Block, Inc. in 2004, as a senior vice president and chief legal officer. He resigned in 2007 and joined the Federal Home Loan Bank (FHLB) as executive vice-president, general counsel and chief risk officer.

== Death ==
Spaeth was found dead in his apartment in Fargo, North Dakota on March 16, 2014. He was 64 years old.

== See also ==
- List of law clerks for the sixth seat of the Supreme Court of the United States

Legal offices
Preceded by Robert Wefald	Attorney General of North Dakota; 1985–1992	Succeeded by Heidi Heitkamp
Party political offices
Preceded by Alice Olson	Democratic nominee for Attorney General of North Dakota; 1984, 1988	Succeeded by Heidi Heitkamp
Preceded by George Sinner	Democratic nominee for Governor of North Dakota; 1992	Succeeded by Lee Kaldor
