= Jürgen von Manger =

German actor (1923–1994)

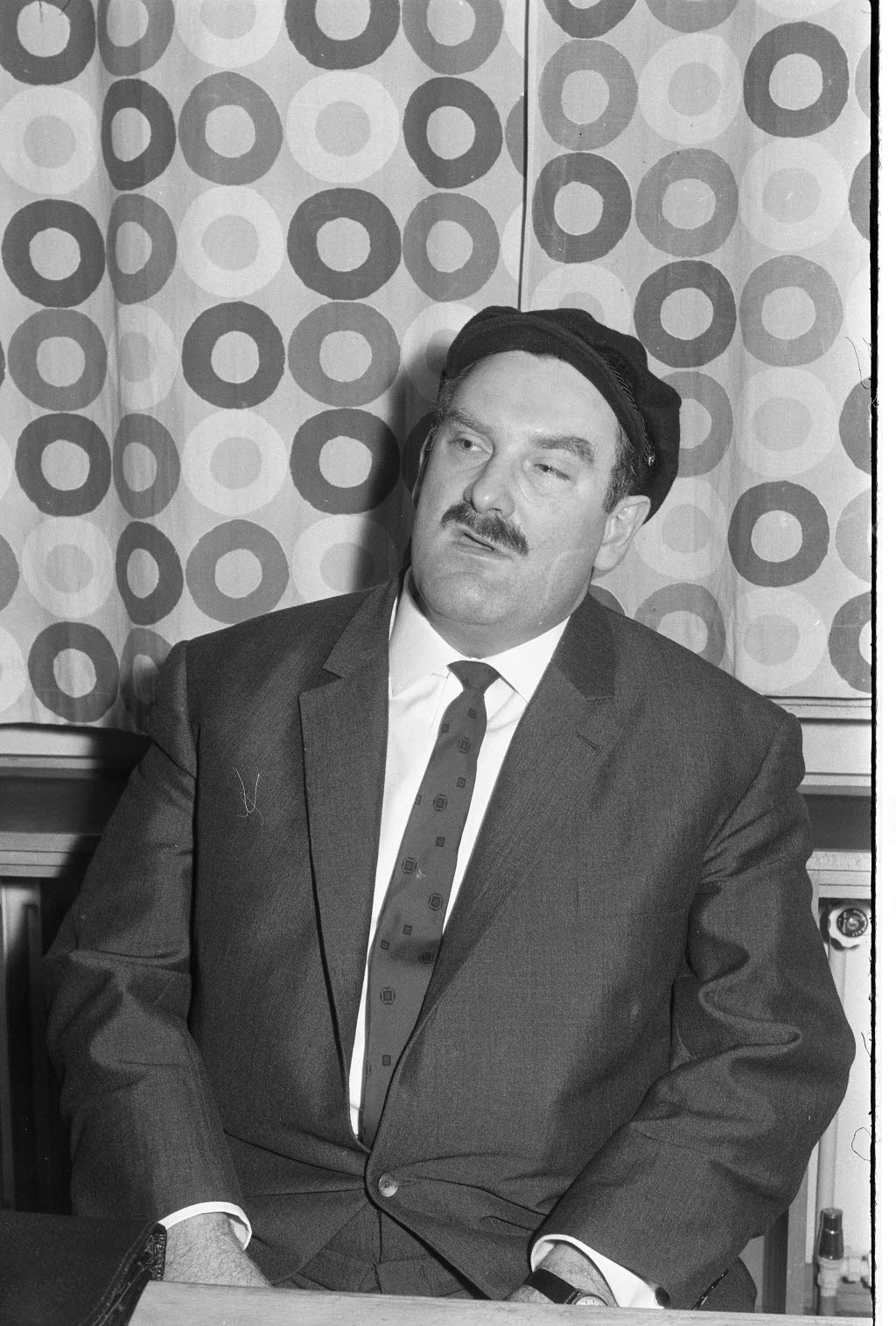
- Jürgen von Manger in 1964
- Born: Jürgen Julius Emil Fritz Koenig; 6 March 1923; Koblenz, Germany
- Died: 15 March 1994 (aged 71); Herne, North Rhine-Westphalia
- Occupations: Actor; Comedian

Jürgen von Manger-Koenig (6 March 1923 – 15 March 1994) was a German actor and comedian.

== Early life ==
Manger was born Jürgen Julius Emil Fritz Koenig in the Koblenz district of Ehrenbreitstein. His stage pseudonym as comedian was Adolf Tegtmeier.

== TV shows ==
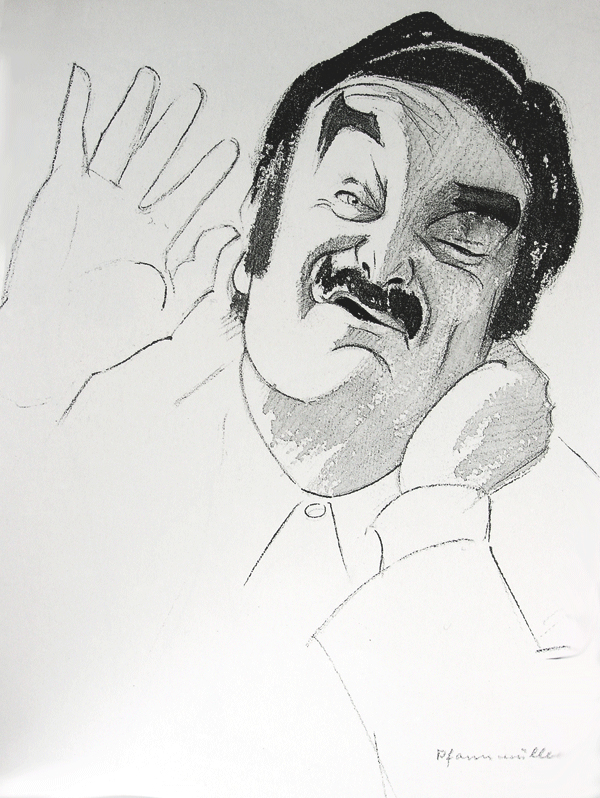
Jürgen von Manger in a caricature (1975)

- Steel net - the twelfth knife (1958)
- Hello, neighbors (various episodes, 1963–1965)
- Secret agent Adolf Tegtmeier (6 episodes, 1966)
- Good evening - sounds, measures and theater (7 episodes, 1966–1968)
- 13 x Macabres (various episodes, 1968)
- Jürgen von Manger as a witness of history (11 episodes, 1969)
- ARD - Glücksspirale (various episodes, 1969)
- In good German said (10 episodes, 1969)
- Stay human, says Tegtmeier (8 episodes, 1970)
- Tegtmeier's travels (20 episodes, 1972–1980)
- Election advertising for the FDP (various episodes, 1972)
- So Ääährlich - Tegtmeier's most beautiful Stückskes (various episodes, 1977)
- Tegtmeier clarifies (14 episodes, 1981–1983)
- When the television pictures become plastic (2 episodes, 1982)
- Tegtmeier (6 episodes, 1984–1985)
- Between onion and doubt (8 episodes, 1984–1986)

== Television film ==
- Mr. Tägmeier tells (1962)
- The Mother-In-Law (1963)
- The driving school examination (1963)
- Line up for a date in Cologne (1964)
- The Marriage Institute (1964)
- Television - exclusive (1965)
- Looking back - but not in anger (1965)
- Program without broadcast (1965) (broadcast 1968)
- Adieu 1965 - Hello 1966 (1965/66)
- In this country nowadays: Ruhr parodists (1967)
- Travel in Germany (1968)
- The next one please! (1968)
- Review 68 (1968)
- Happiness Spiral (1970)
- Tegtmeier's Stückskes (1970)
- Aeehräu - That's life (1979)
- Jürgen von Manger - So Ääährlich... (1981) (broadcast 1987)
- Two dead in the transmitter and Don Carlos in the PoGl (1982)
- Schalkshow'82 (1982)
- Permit, Tegtmeier, in the front with Adolf (1982)
- Progress in technology - the step backwards of people (1984)
- Freshly Turned (1984)
- Songs and Words for the Turn (1984)
- Olympic speech (1984)
- Fresh, cheeky, happy-free? (1984)
- Tegtmeiers Trost (1984) (possibly only working title)
- Man, Tegtmeier! - Tour at IFA Berlin (1985) (canceled due to illness)
- On the 70th birthday of Jürgen von Manger (1993) (last television appearance)

== Literature ==
- Peter F. Schütze, Mirjam von Jankó (ed.): One should imitate me first. Adolf Tegtmeier and Jürgen von Manger. Clear text, Essen 1998, ISBN 3-88474-659-6. (with bibliography, pp. 173–175, and discography, pp. 175–176.)
- Wolfgang Schütz: Koblenz heads. People in the history of the city - namesake for streets and squares. 2nd revised. u. adult Edition. Publisher for advertising papers, Mülheim-Kärlich 2005, OCLC 712343799.
- Gerhard Schiweck (ed.) And Torsten Kropp (caricatures): Tegtmeier's heirs - "... maybe dat is a thing ..." An original and its heirs in 13 pictures. Frischtexte-Verlag, Herne 2009, ISBN 978-3-933059-09-3.
