= Heitkamp BauHolding =

Heitkamp BauHolding GmbH
- Type: GmbH
- Industry: Construction company
- Founded: 1892
- Headquarters: Herne, Germany
- Key people: Dipl.-Ing. Michael Müller, company spokesman Dipl.-Ing. Jörg Kranz Dipl.-Kfm. Gerhard Wilwerding
- Products: Civil engineering and power plant construction Infrastructure building Universal construction Special construction
- Revenue: €350 million (2009)
- Number of employees: 1096 (2009)
- Website: www.heitkamp.de

The Heitkamp BauHolding GmbH with headquarters in Herne, North Rhine-Westphalia, is specialized civil engineering and construction company. It is a holding company with 1,200 total employees across all of its locations and generates US$365.77 million in sales. There are 6 companies in the Heitkamp BauHolding GmbH group of companies.

== History ==
Today's Heitkamp BauHolding GmbH has its origin in the civil engineering company E. Heitkamp, which was founded in Herne-Wanne in 1892 by Engelbert Scharpwinkel. It originally had four employees. The company was originally known as E. Heitkamp. Towards the end of the 19th century, the company built canals and roads for the farmers in the neighbourhood.

=== 1902 ===
Heinrich Heitkamp, the son of E. Scharpwinkel, assumed the management of the still young construction company and expanded its field of activity by entering the mining business which was the characteristic industry in the Ruhr area at the time. In addition, he entered into other ventures. In the following decades, its construction activities were expanded beyond the limits of Herne and its original sectors to include civil engineering, railroad, and infrastructure projects, as well as mining services. At that time, the projects included, for example, the new construction of the Herne railway station, the construction of the Chemische Werke Hüls in Marl, earthwork, canal and regulation work for the Emschergenossenschaft and the Lippeverband, the beginning of motorway constructions. In addition, they worked in shafting-sinking activities for regional coal mines, such as the Shamrock Mine, Unser Fritz Mine and others.

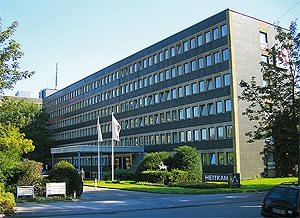
Head office in Herne, Germany

=== 1946 to 1963 ===
In 1946, the E. Heitkamp Tiefbaugeschäft in Wanne-Eickel was renamed to Bauunternehmung E. Heitkamp GmbH. His sons Heinrich and Robert became shareholders along with their father, Heinrich Heitkamp, Sr. Following the removal of war debris from their building, the field of activity was expanded to include other areas. Buildings for government agencies and the Deutsche Bundesbahn were constructed and in the early fifties, the company started providing special mining services with underground track constructions.

In 1957, Heitkamp entered the power plant construction sector by executing a contract for the Westerholt power plant owned by Hibernia AG. For the first time, refuse dumps were used for the construction of dams and roads. Heitkamp participated in the complete expansion of the Ruhr expressway from Essen via Bochum to Dortmund as well as in the new construction of the railway line between Gelsenkirchen and Haltern am See.

This was followed by a participation in the construction of the Henrichshütte 2 steel plant in Hattingen as well as the Brassert power plant in Marl and the Springorum power plant in Bochum. A patent was issued on 28 May 1958 for the track-tamping machine developed by Heitkamp for underground track construction. In 1960, Heitkamp entered the tunnel construction sector when the company built the Erbscheidt tunnel in the course of the Bigge dam construction. In addition, Heitkamp was awarded contracts for the construction of the Federal Ministry of Defence in Germany at the Hardthöhe in Bonn. At this time, Heitkamp employed about 4,000 people.

=== 1964 to 1980 ===
In 1964, Robert Heitkamp took over the sole management and expanded the family company in the next decades to become one of the largest construction companies in Germany. In the same year, Heitkamp built the first natural-draught cooling tower for the power plant in Ibbenbüren. This was followed by 53 cooling towers in Germany and another 38 cooling towers worldwide, including countries in the African continent, Australia, Greece, the Netherlands, Spain, and the United States. In 1995, in the course of the largest individual contract in the history of the company, Heitkamp built two natural-draught cooling towers for the Lippendorf power plant, amongst others. In 1998, they built the highest natural-draught cooling tower in the world, reaching 200 meters, at the Niederaußem power plant.

=== 1970 to 1981 ===
Heitkamp participated in national and international construction projects that included, amongst others, power plant and nuclear power plant projects, infrastructure, civil engineering, structural engineering, hydraulic engineering, and mining projects.

Heitkamp participated, among other companies, in the construction of the nuclear power plants in Brunsbüttel, Phillippsburg I and II and Brokdorf. In addition, they participated in the construction of nuclear power plants internationally in Tullnerfeld and Zwentendorf in Austria and Gösgen-Däniken in Switzerland.

Heitkamp, along with the companies Hochtief AG and Dykerhoff & Widmann AG, was awarded the contract to build the reprocessing plant in Wackersdorf. The construction, however, was stopped in 1989 for political reasons.

They participated in German infrastructure projects including the participation in the construction of the subways in Berlin, Hanover, Bielefeld, Dortmund, Stuttgart and Munich. In addition, they participated in work on the Autobahn 42, the Emscher expressway and the Autobahn 45, also known as the Sauerland line. Internationally, Heitkamp was involved in road construction projects in Sanaa, Yemen to Taiz, Yemen; and Taiz to the Red Sea. Also, they were involved in the subway construction in Vienna, Austria. Before it was stopped for political reasons, they took over the technical lead management during the construction of the first channel tunnel connecting Dover with Calais.

They were involved with hydraulic engineering projects at that time including the construction of the Obernau dam and the redirecting of the Ruhr at Neheim. Their international projects included the construction of the Hofuf drainage project in Saudi Arabia and the construction of a drainage tunnel in Venezuela.

Heitkamp expanded its civil engineering activities to include turnkey construction services. Heitkamp was involved in the construction of the 3-bay road bridge Zum Fürstenmoor that carried the road from Hamburg to Harburg, the Emscher bridge that carried the road from Dortmund to Deusenberg, and the Annener Berg bridge in the Witten-Annen area. They also participated in the building of the underground parking lot at the Cologne cathedral. Heitkamp was involved in many tunnel projects in the course of the Bundesbahn high-speed line from Kassel to Würzburg. Heitkamp was also involved in the construction of the Olympic site in Munich.

During that period, Heitkamp was also involved in the construction of the Technische Rathaus in Frankfurt, the construction of the Parkstadion in Gelsenkirchen, buildings for Technische Universität Berlin, work for the extension of the airports in Frankfurt and Hannover, the construction of the Lower-Saxon state parliament in Hannover, hotel constructions such as the Hotel Penta and Hotel Steigenberger in Berlin and the construction of hospitals for the Federal Insurance Fund for Miners in Recklinghausen and Bochum as well as the clinical centre in Münster.

In the mining sector, Heitkamp was involved in the construction of the shaft tower with reinforced concrete for the Consolidation 3/4/9 mine in Gelsenkirchen and the construction of the new An der Haard mine in the Recklinghausen district. At this time, Heitkamp also began with the removal, marketing and stockpiling of tailings from mines in the Ruhr area.

The railway construction division constructed tracks for the Elmshorn-Barmstedt-Oldesloer-Eisenbahn AG. Internationally, it participated in the renewal of the railway line between Riyadh and Dammam in Saudi Arabia.

Dr. Alfred Herrhausen became the first chairman of the newly created advisory board.

=== 1981 to 1999 ===
In 1981, the company employed approximately 8,500 people and achieved a turnover of approximately 1.1 billion DM. Robert Heitkamp retired from the operational business and passed the management chair to his son, Prof. Dr. Engelbert Heitkamp.

Until the German reunification in 1990, Heitkamp expanded its field of activity in the refurbishment, modernization and redevelopment of structures. One of their first modernization projects included the two city hall towers in Marl in Westphalia. The subsidiary Heitkamp Umwelttechnik GmbH was formed in 1985. Because of the widespread introduction of mobile phone networks, Heitkamp built stations for the C-net of the Deutsche Bundespost and later for the private D-net.

Heitkamp participated in the building of the Eurotunnel between Calais and Dover and in the construction of German subway and urban railway projects, notably in Dortmund. For the Deutsche Bahn, Heitkamp engineered several works to support the new Cologne – Rhine/Main line.

During this period, the company participated in the coating of the outer shell of the natural-draught cooling tower at the cogeneration plant in Völklingen, the natural-draught cooling tower for the nuclear power plant Isar 2 in Landshut, the Hoheward railway tunnel at the Hoheward waste tip in Herten, and an ICE train wash facility for the Deutschebahn in Hamburg-Eidelstedt. In addition, during this time period, the company took part in the construction of subway structures in Frankfurt, Nuremberg, Duisburg and Berlin, among others; the construction of the A 560 motorway, the Hennef bypass, and the Autobahn 57 between Goch and the Dutch border; the construction of the interim storage facility for fuel elements in Ahaus; an apartment hotel, administrative building, medical centre, and supermarket at the Ungererpark in Munich; construction of the headquarters of the Aral AG in Gelsenkirchen-Scholven; and the construction of the Daimler-Benz headquarters in Stuttgart-Möhringen.

After the German reunification in 1990, Heitkamp participated in construction projects for the five new federal states and established offices in Chemnitz, Dresden, Erfurt, Magdeburg, Potsdam, Halle and Rostock. This includes, amongst others, rebuilding the new synagogue in the Oranienburger Straße in Berlin, coating the natural-draught cooling tower in Rostock, participating in the Markt Nordseite development in Weimar, reconstructing parts of the Dutch district in Potsdam, participating in the Siemens Microelectronics Center in Dresden, and the lowering of the Rheinufer-Tunnel in Düsseldorf and the extension of the Autobahn 2 in the Bottrop area.

Mining construction activities included, amongst others, the coke-side dust removal for the Zollverein coking plant in Essen in addition to various projects in the Ore Mountains.

In 1990, Heitkamp merged with Deilmann-Haniel GmbH. The construction activities of both companies were combined in the E. Heitkamp GmbH, while the mining activities were combined in the Deilmann-Haniel GmbH. The civil engineering projects of were moved to make up the legally independent subsidiary Heitkamp Erd- und Straßenbau GmbH.

=== 2000 until today ===
In 2001, the activities of former Railway Construction Division were transferred to the independent subsidiary Heitkamp Rail GmbH.

In this era, the company was involved in building the bridging structures (Bügelbauten) at the Berlin Hauptbahnhof; the construction of the transparent factory (Gläserne Manufaktur) of Volkswagen in Dresden and the Zollernhof in Berlin for the ZDF TV Studio; the construction of the National Bank building in Riga, Latvia; the construction of the double water-saving lock in Hohenwarte; the modernization of the former Mannesmann high-rise building in Düsseldorf; the construction and modernisation of the Marstallplatz Munich complex on Maximilianstraße; the construction of the new Cologne – Rhine/Main line of the Deutsche Bahn; and the construction of a university building, including a library, for Malmö University in Malmö, Sweden.

Due to a massive drop in orders in the mining sector and the increasing competition in the German construction industry, Heitkamp-Deilmann-Haniel GmbH decided at the end of 2005 to take drastic restructuring measures. In the course of these restructuring measures, the ATON GmbH acquired the parts of the domestic special mining and the international special mining division. ATON is today's Deilmann-Haniel International Mining and Tunnelling GmbH. Heijmans, a Dutch group of companies, acquired the Heitkamp Rail GmbH. In addition, the Turnkey Construction Office in Ratingen closed along with the offices in Düsseldorf, Dortmund, Hamburg, Munich and Stuttgart. Also, the civil engineering departments of the Bauunternehmung E. Heitkamp GmbH were combined to make up the independent subsidiary Heitkamp Ingenieur- und Kraftwerksbau GmbH.

In 2008, the Heitkamp-Deilmann-Haniel GmbH was renamed as Heitkamp BauHolding GmbH, which is its name today.

The Heitkamp BauHolding GmbH combines now the following four business areas: civil engineering and power plant construction under the Heitkamp Ingenieur- und Kraftwerksbau GmbH brand; infrastructure building under the Heitkamp Umwelttechnik GmbH, Heitkamp Erd- und Straßenbau GmbH brand; universal construction under the Domoplan GmbH, Heitkamp ProjektPartner GmbH brand; and special construction under the BuM Beton- und Monierbau GmbH, Bergsicherung Schneeberg GmbH, and Bergsicherung Ilfeld GmbH brands.

Currently, the largest project abroad involves the construction of the Olkiluoto nuclear power plant in Finland. They were involved under Heitkamp Erd- und Straßenbau GmbH brand in the construction of the Lake Phoenix in Dortmund-Hörde as well as the widening to 6-lanes and modernization of motorways, including the Autobahn 1, 2, 40 and 42 motorways deserves special mention. They were also involved in the redevelopment of the Kamener Kreuz.

In February 2009, Jürgen R. Thumann, a great-grandson of the founder of the company, took over the majority of the shares in the Heitkamp Group. Since then, he has been the chairman of the board of directors. Heitkamp-Deilmann-Haniel GmbH changed its name to Heitkamp BauHolding.

In 2013, the company relocated to a new headquarters on the Pluto site in Herne. In 2014, the Heitkamp bridge and civil engineering company was founded.
