= News and Views (radio program) =

News and Views is a talk radio program produced by KFGO in Fargo, North Dakota that airs weekdays between 8:00 a.m. and 11:00 a.m. Central Time.

Joel Heitkamp hosts the show. The show's format is interviews with newsmakers and telephone call-ins; the host and guests have ample opportunity to express their opinions, but also open the subject to discussion. Telephone callers are "taken cold" — that is, no pre-screening of callers occurs before going to air.

The show was launched with Ed Schultz, who later went on to host a national program, The Ed Schultz Show in 2004, and returned as host on February 1, 2007 replacing former North Dakota State Senator Joel Heitkamp. Heitkamp took the helm again in 2009 when Schultz moved to New York to launch The Ed Show. Guest hosts fill in when the main host is not present; common hosts are David Crothers, CEO of the North Dakota Association of Telecommunications Cooperatives, and Al Carlson, North Dakota House of Representatives Majority Leader.

== Affiliates ==
The first hour of the program is carried exclusively on KFGO. Affiliates carry News and Views between 9am and 11am.

- KFGO 790/104.7 Fargo (flagship)
- KEYZ 660 Williston
- KNDK 1080 Langdon

Former affiliates

Prior to April 2013, the show was also carried between 9 and 11 am by KFYR 550 Bismarck and KCJB 910 Minot.
