= Heidi Heitkamp =

American politician (born 1955)

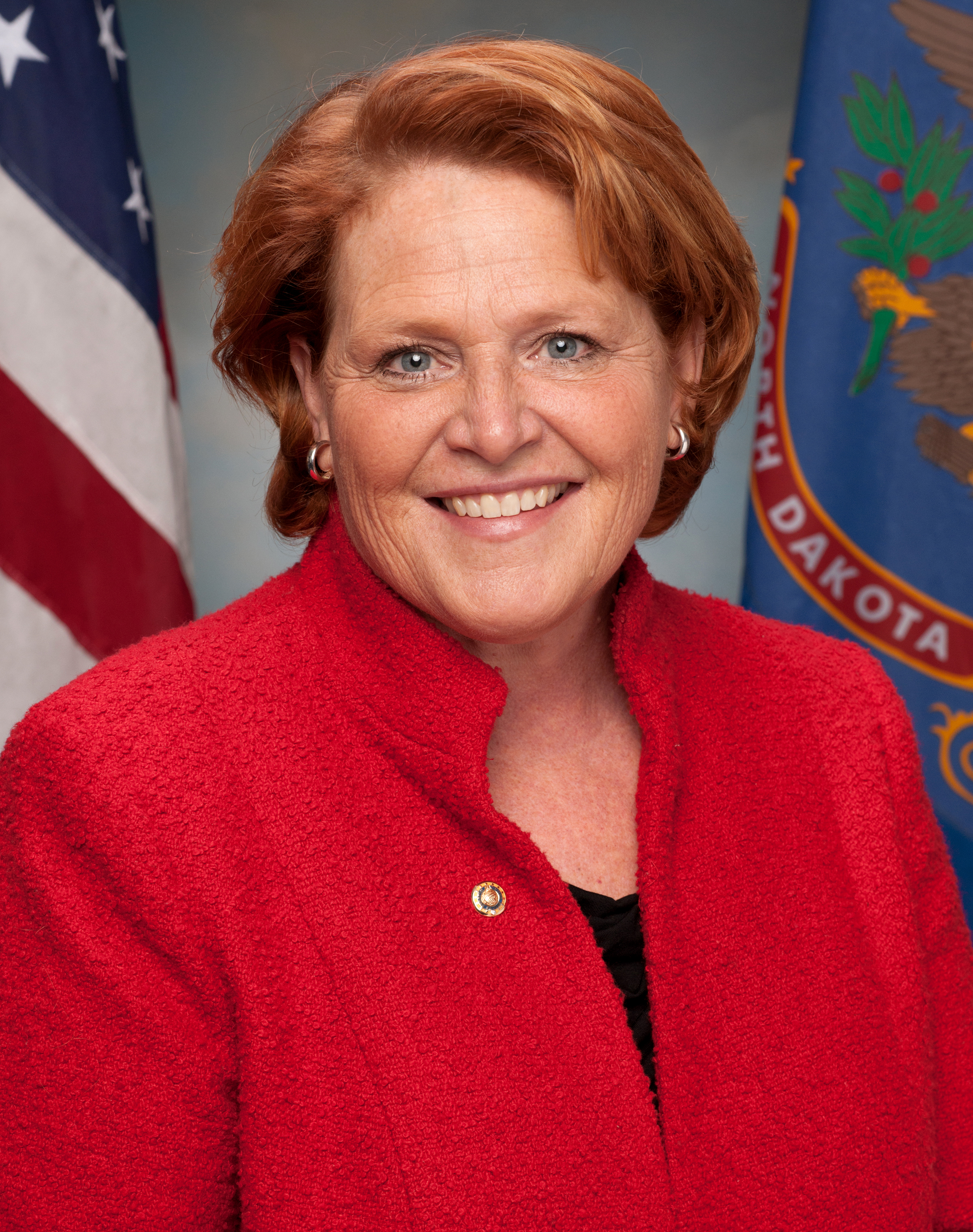
- Official portrait, 2013

United States Senator from North Dakota
- In office January 3, 2013 – January 3, 2019
- Preceded by: Kent Conrad
- Succeeded by: Kevin Cramer

28th Attorney General of North Dakota
- In office December 15, 1992 – December 15, 2000
- Governor: Ed Schafer
- Preceded by: Nicholas Spaeth
- Succeeded by: Wayne Stenehjem

20th Tax Commissioner of North Dakota
- In office December 2, 1986 – December 15, 1992
- Governor: George Sinner
- Preceded by: Kent Conrad
- Succeeded by: Robert Hanson

Personal details
- Born: Mary Kathryn Heitkamp; October 30, 1955 (age 70) Breckenridge, Minnesota, U.S.
- Party: Democratic (D-NPL)
- Spouse: Darwin Lange
- Children: 2
- Relatives: Joel Heitkamp (brother); Jason Heitkamp (cousin)
- Education: University of North Dakota (BA); Lewis and Clark College (JD)
- Heitkamp's voice Heitkamp questioning witnesses on FEMA grants for volunteer fire departments. Recorded April 12, 2016

Mary Kathryn "Heidi" Heitkamp (/ˈhaɪtkæmp/, HYTE-kamp; born October 30, 1955) is an American politician and lawyer who served as a United States senator from North Dakota from 2013 to 2019. A member of the North Dakota Democratic–Nonpartisan League Party, her 2012 victory made her the first woman elected to Congress from North Dakota, where she served as the 20th tax commissioner from 1986 to 1992 and as the 28th state attorney general from 1992 to 2000. As of 2026, she is the last Democrat to have won or held statewide office in North Dakota.

Heitkamp ran for governor of North Dakota in 2000 and lost to Republican John Hoeven. She considered a bid for the Democratic nomination in the 2010 U.S. Senate election to replace the retiring Byron Dorgan, but on March 3, 2010, declined to run against Hoeven, who was ultimately elected.

In November 2011, Heitkamp declared her candidacy to replace the retiring Kent Conrad as U.S. senator from North Dakota in the 2012 election. She narrowly defeated Republican Congressman Rick Berg on November 6, 2012, in that year's closest Senate race. Heitkamp was North Dakota's second female senator, after Jocelyn Burdick, and the first woman to be elected to the Senate from the state. On November 6, 2018, Republican congressman Kevin Cramer defeated Heitkamp in her bid for reelection. After leaving the Senate, Heitkamp became a CNBC contributor and visiting fellow at the Harvard Kennedy School's Institute of Politics. In April 2019, with Senator Joe Donnelly of Indiana (who also lost reelection in 2018), she launched One Country Project, an organization aimed at helping Democrats reconnect with rural voters. In January 2023, Heitkamp became the director of the University of Chicago Institute of Politics, serving until November 2025.

== Early life and education ==
Heitkamp was born in Breckenridge, Minnesota, the fourth of seven children of Doreen LaVonne (née Berg), a school cook, and Raymond Bernard Heitkamp, a janitor and construction worker. Her father was of German descent, her mother of half Norwegian and half German ancestry. Heitkamp was raised in Mantador, North Dakota, attending local public schools. She adopted the nickname "Heidi" in first grade to distinguish herself from two other classmates named Mary and Kathy. She earned a B.A. from the University of North Dakota in 1977 and a J.D. from Lewis & Clark Law School in 1980.

== Early career ==
Heitkamp interned for the United States Congress in 1976 and in the North Dakota Legislative Assembly in 1977.

=== Practicing attorney and politics ===
In 1980 and 1981, Heitkamp worked as an attorney for the Environmental Protection Agency. She next worked as an attorney for North Dakota State Tax Commissioner Kent Conrad.

She also became active in politics, joining the North Dakota Democratic–Nonpartisan League Party. In 1984, Heitkamp ran for state Auditor and lost to incumbent Republican Robert W. Peterson. In 1986, Kent Conrad resigned as tax commissioner after his election to the U.S. Senate. North Dakota Governor George A. Sinner appointed Heitkamp tax commissioner before she ran for the office and was elected with 66% of the vote against Republican Marshall Moore. She served in that position until 1992.

=== North Dakota attorney general ===
In 1992, the incumbent North Dakota attorney general, Nick Spaeth, retired in order to run for governor. Heitkamp ran for attorney general and won with 62% of the vote. She was reelected in 1996 with 64% of the vote.

As attorney general of North Dakota, Heitkamp became known for leading the state's legal efforts to seek damages from tobacco companies, eventually resulting in the Tobacco Master Settlement Agreement.

=== 2000 gubernatorial election ===
In 2000, incumbent Republican governor Ed Schafer decided not to seek a third term. Heitkamp ran unopposed in the Democratic primary. On the Republican side, John Hoeven, CEO of the Bank of North Dakota, also ran unopposed. During her campaign for governor, it was announced that Heitkamp had been diagnosed with breast cancer, which later went into remission. Hoeven defeated her, 55% to 45%. Heitkamp won 12 of the state's 53 counties.

=== Business ===
From 2001 to 2012, Heitkamp served as an external director on the Dakota Gasification Company's Great Plains synfuels plant's board of directors. She now serves on the advisory board of the Canadian American Business Council.

Heitkamp's brother, Joel, is a radio talk-show host and former North Dakota state senator. Heitkamp has occasionally filled in as host of his program, News and Views, which is broadcast on KFGO in Fargo and other stations in North Dakota.

== U.S. Senate ==
=== Elections ===
==== 2012 ====
In January 2011, incumbent Democratic U.S. senator Kent Conrad announced he would not seek reelection in 2012. On November 8, 2011, Heitkamp announced that she would seek the open seat. She vowed to be "an independent voice".

Heitkamp won the November 6, 2012, Senate election by 2,936 votes, less than 1% of the ballots cast. Berg conceded the race the next day, though he could have asked for a "demand recount" under North Dakota law.

In 2014, The Daily Beast suggested that Heitkamp might be a presidential contender in 2020, writing that she had come to Washington "personifying traditional values of the Old West: candor, consistency, hard work, and a sense of good faith and fair play."

In December 2016, it was reported that President-elect Donald Trump was considering Heitkamp for Secretary of Agriculture. In response, Heitkamp said on the radio that she would likely refuse any such offer. "I'm not saying 'never, never,' but I will tell you that I'm very, very honored to serve the people of North Dakota and I hope that no matter what I do, that will always be my first priority...The job that I have right now is incredibly challenging. I love it." Trump eventually nominated former Georgia governor Sonny Perdue for the job.

Heitkamp represented North Dakota in the Senate from January 3, 2013 to January 3, 2019, alongside Republican John Hoeven, her former opponent in the governor's race.

==== 2018 ====
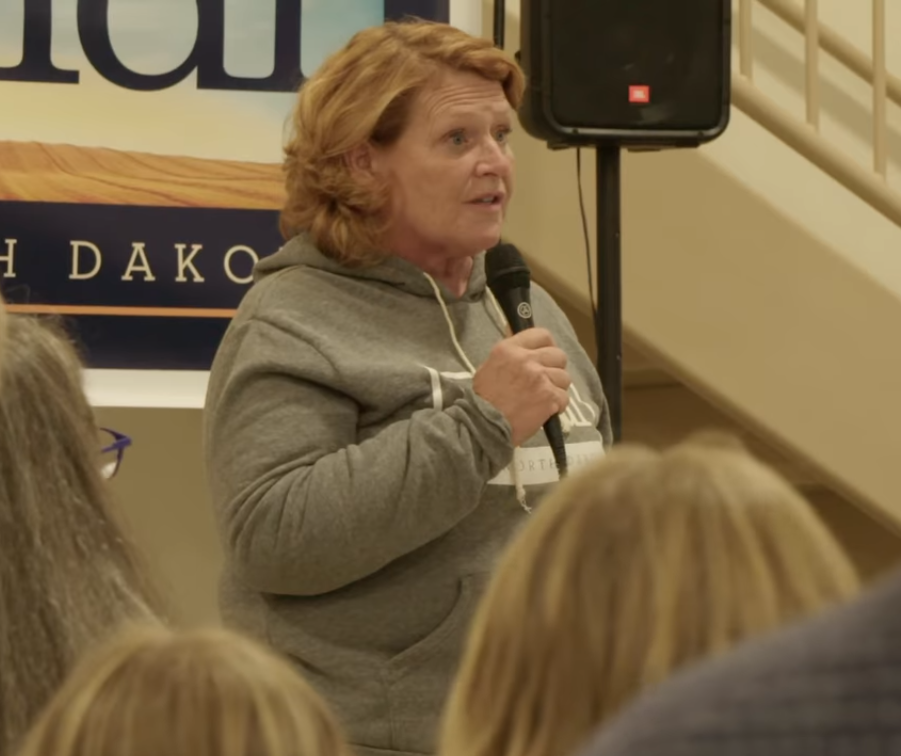
Heitkamp campaigning in October 2018

On September 13, 2017, a day after dining at the White House with several other senators and Trump, Heitkamp announced she would seek a second term. She spoke of the importance of legislation regarding infrastructure, tax reform, and energy and farm policy. Representative Kevin Cramer won the Republican primary to challenge Heitkamp.

In October 2018, Heitkamp apologized after her campaign ran a newspaper advertisement that "included names of victims of domestic violence, sexual assault or rape without their permission."

On November 6, 2018, Cramer defeated Heitkamp with 55.4% of the vote, despite raising $22 million less than her.

=== Committee assignments ===
- Committee on Agriculture, Nutrition and Forestry
  - Subcommittee on Commodities, Markets, Trade and Risk Management (Ranking Member)
  - Subcommittee on Livestock, Marketing and Agriculture Security
  - Subcommittee on Jobs, Rural Economic Growth and Energy Innovation
- Committee on Banking, Housing, and Urban Affairs
  - Subcommittee on Economic Policy (Ranking Member)
  - Subcommittee on Housing, Transportation, and Community Development
  - Subcommittee on National Security and International Trade and Finance
- Committee on Homeland Security and Governmental Affairs
  - Permanent Subcommittee on Investigations
  - Subcommittee on Regulatory Affairs and Federal Management (Ranking Member)
- Committee on Indian Affairs
- Committee on Small Business and Entrepreneurship

=== Caucus memberships ===
- Afterschool Caucuses
- Congressional NextGen 9-1-1 Caucus

== Later career ==
Heitkamp is a contributor to CNBC. In the 2020 presidential election, she was on North Dakota's Democratic-NPL elector slate for Joe Biden. Trump won the state's three electoral votes. In 2020, she was named a potential candidate for Secretary of Agriculture in the Biden Administration. Biden ultimately chose Tom Vilsack, who had previously held the position under President Barack Obama.

In 2021, Heitkamp lobbied against Democratic Party efforts to raise taxes on corporations, large inheritances and the superwealthy to pay for a $3.5 trillion social spending bill. The lobbyist John Breaux recruited her to advocate against taxation of large inheritances.

In October 2022, Heitkamp was named director of the Institute of Politics at the University of Chicago in Chicago, IL, after previously serving there as a Pritzker Fellow. In January 2025, announced she would step down at the end of the year. On October 20, 2025, John Kirby was named as her successor.

Heitkamp is a board member for American Edge, a lobbying organization for the technology industry, and Norfolk Southern.

== Political positions ==
Heitkamp has been described as a moderate Democrat. She was considered a centrist and often supported bipartisan legislation. The National Journal has given her a composite rating of 53% liberal and 47% conservative. The American Conservative Union gives her a lifetime 13.67% conservative rating. The fiscally conservative group Americans for Prosperity gives Heitkamp a lifetime score of 26% and a higher score of 70% in 2016. Americans for Democratic Action, which supports liberal positions, gave her a score of 45% liberal in 2016 and 60% liberal in 2015. According to FiveThirtyEight, Heitkamp voted in line with Trump's positions over 54% of the time. Congressional Quarterly published a study finding that she voted with Trump's position 67% of the time. The Associated Press found that she voted with his positions more than 68% of the time. In 2018, GovTrack placed Heitkamp near the center of the Senate as the third-most moderate Democrat, to the right of moderate Republican senator Susan Collins.

In March 2018, Heitkamp co-sponsored the Israel Anti-Boycott Act (s. 720), which would have made it a federal crime for American contractors to encourage or participate in boycotts against Israel and Israeli settlements in the occupied Palestinian territories if protesting actions by the Israeli government.

In June 2018, Americans for Prosperity, which is backed by the Koch brothers, ran digital advertisements thanking Heitkamp for her vote to pass legislation loosening financial regulations on banks.

=== Healthcare ===
Heitkamp has said that the Affordable Care Act contains "good and bad" elements and that "it needs to be fixed." She criticized her Senate race opponent Rick Berg for wanting to repeal the law, citing concerns about insurance companies denying coverage to children with preexisting conditions.

During the United States federal government shutdown of 2013, Heitkamp criticized Republican attempts to use the Continuing Appropriations Resolution as "a vehicle to legislate other issues," such as the defunding of the Affordable Care Act and a delay of its individual mandate. She was one of 14 members of the bipartisan Senate group that negotiated the compromise that was the basis of the eventual deal to end the shutdown. During the 2013 government shutdown, Heitkamp donated about $8,000 of her salary to North Dakota charities that support veterans, provide healthcare supplies to those that cannot afford them, and raise breast cancer awareness.

In January 2018, Heitkamp was one of six Democrats to join Republican senators in voting to confirm President Donald Trump's nominee for Health and Human Services Secretary Alex Azar.

=== Economic issues ===
Heitkamp sought for the Trump Administration "to get the Export-Import Bank in high gear to help North Dakota's economy."

Heitkamp said she would support a balanced budget amendment to the Constitution "with exceptions" if elected. She said the exceptions would include wartime spending, Social Security, Medicare, and a ban on tax cuts for those making more than $1 million per year.

Heitkamp announced in a 2012 campaign press release that she supports the Buffett Rule. She supports implementing the Buffett Rule via the Paying a Fair Share Act, which would require those making a gross income of $1 million or more to pay at least a 30% federal tax rate.

After Trump's inauguration in 2017, Heitkamp was described as being "under intense pressure from the president to defect to the tax reform cause." On December 1, 2017, she joined every Democrat and 14 House and Senate Republicans in voting against the Tax Cuts and Jobs Act of 2017.

Heitkamp was described in 2017 as wanting "to use her White House connections to prod Trump to take a softer view on trade".

Politico wrote in 2017 that Heitkamp "hates the White House's budget's agriculture cuts and believes they'd devastate North Dakota".

Heitkamp was one of the chief architects of a bank deregulation bill that rolled back provisions of Dodd-Frank. Many progressives, most notably Elizabeth Warren, have urged her colleagues to oppose the bill. She was one of 17 Democrats who broke with the majority of their party and voted with Republicans to ease bank regulations. Trump invited Heitkamp to take part in the signing ceremony after the bill's passage.

=== Same-sex marriage ===
On April 5, 2013, Heitkamp announced her support for same-sex marriage, along with fellow red state Democratic Senator Joe Donnelly, who entered the Senate at the same time Heitkamp did.

=== Abortion ===
When running for Senate in 2012, Heitkamp said she opposed public funding of abortions and believed that "late term abortions should be illegal except when necessary to save the life of the mother." After her election, however, she voted to filibuster a bill that would have made abortions illegal after the fifth month of pregnancy except when the mother's life is endangered. Heitkamp's apparent shift led to criticism by Marjorie Dannenfelser of the anti-abortion Susan B. Anthony List.

Planned Parenthood, which supports legal abortion and reproductive rights, has given Heitkamp a 100% lifetime rating. She received a 100% rating from NARAL Pro-Choice America, a 20% rating from the anti-abortion organization National Right to Life, and a 20% rating from Democrats for Life, a group of anti-abortion Democrats.

=== Filibuster reform ===
Heitkamp said she supports reforming the filibuster in the United States Senate, but did not endorse the proposal by Senators Ron Wyden and Tom Udall to do so.

=== Support for Hillary Clinton ===
Heitkamp was described in 2014 as a "Hillary Clinton fan" who believed Clinton would "run, win, and be 'an excellent president.'" She said of Clinton, "I think she transcends gender. When people look at her, they don't see male or female. They see a very accomplished, qualified candidate. She's very collaborative, very open to a different way of looking at things, uber smart. She digs down and understands an issue."

Heitkamp was less enthusiastic about Clinton by 2016, in light of her email controversy and what Heitkamp perceived as Clinton's turn to the left. In 2018, when asked when Clinton would "ride off into the sunset," Heitkamp replied, "Not soon enough."

=== Relationship with Donald Trump ===
After the 2016 presidential election, in which Trump won North Dakota overwhelmingly, Heitkamp said she did not have to change her views to appeal to Trump supporters. In December 2016, she told Bloomberg News, "Many of the people who voted for Donald Trump are the same voters from rural communities who I know, grew up with and work with every day." According to Bloomberg, Heitkamp "hinted at a preference for Trump politicos over Washington ones because the former don't 'come as establishment Republicans,' but have a great 'willingness to listen to a different perspective.'"

In a June 2017 profile, Burgess Everett of Politico wrote, "Washington is a surprisingly cozy place right now for Heitkamp. She met with Trump about a Cabinet position in December, visited the White House three times since and speaks regularly to Trump's chief of staff Reince Priebus and top economic adviser Gary Cohn...Heitkamp is plainly chummier with Trump than she was to President Barack Obama." Everett quoted Senate Minority Whip Dick Durbin as saying that it is "a complete waste of time" to try to get Heitkamp to vote with her party when she is determined to do otherwise. "Her independence, and her closeness to Trump, will be a boon if she does run again," Everett wrote. "Republicans respect Heitkamp, and Sen. John Hoeven (R-N.D.) said she will enter as the favorite."

On September 6, 2017, Trump gave a speech in North Dakota and, in addition to inviting Republican officials onstage, also asked Heitkamp to join him, explaining: "Everyone's saying: What's she doing up here? But I'll tell you what: Good woman, and I think we'll have your support—I hope we'll have your support. And thank you very much, senator. Thank you for coming up." Amber Phillips of The Washington Post noted that given Trump's popularity in North Dakota, his remarks had amounted to "a potentially massive boost" for Heitkamp as she sought "to remain the state's lone statewide elected Democrat." Heitkamp had flown with Trump to North Dakota on Air Force One.

Heitkamp heard from approximately 1,400 North Dakotans about Trump's nomination of Betsy DeVos for Secretary of Education. About 1,330 of them opposed it. She then announced her opposition to DeVos, attributing her decision to this overwhelming public reaction. "Need an education secretary who puts students 1st & will work to strengthen public school education, not privatize it as Betsy DeVos would," Heitkamp tweeted.

Heitkamp was the first Democrat to support and one of the handful of Democrats to vote to confirm Trump's nominee Mike Pompeo as Secretary of State.

According to FiveThirtyEight, during her final two years in the Senate, Heitkamp voted the second-most in line with Trump among the Democratic Caucus, behind only Senator Joe Manchin of West Virginia.

Relationship with Joe Biden

In regards to President Biden dropping out of the 2024 presidential election, Heitkamp said on July 21, 2024 that while she considers Biden an ally and a close friend, she added "[today was] a good day for the Democratic Party." She called his decision "a sacrifice he is making for the country." and added "He has served this country so ably, it can't have been easy."

=== Supreme Court ===
Heitkamp voted to confirm Neil Gorsuch to the U.S. Supreme Court, telling CNBC that she had made this decision "based on an interview and a review of his record." She said: "Would he be the judge I'd pick? No, never...But he is the judge that the duly elected president picked."

In October 2018, Heitkamp voted against confirming Supreme Court nominee Brett Kavanaugh, amid allegations that Kavanaugh had sexually assaulted women. Her vote against Kavanaugh was considered politically risky, given North Dakota's Republican leanings. During the three weeks after her October 6 vote, Real Clear Politics reported her polling deficit in her 2018 reelection campaign against Republican challenger Kevin Cramer had widened from 8.7% to 14%. In an interview, Heitkamp said that the "better part of my career in public life has been working with victims" and that her mother had been sexually assaulted as a teenager.

=== Gun laws ===
Heitkamp had an A rating from the National Rifle Association (NRA) for her consistent support of pro-gun legislation. In 2012, the NRA gave her an 86% score for supporting their positions; Gun Owners of America, another gun rights organization, gave her a 30% rating. Bloomberg News has commented that "on guns, it will be hard to find room to the right of her."

In an April 11, 2013 interview, Heitkamp said that she intended to vote against the Manchin-Toomey amendment, which was introduced in the Senate after the Sandy Hook Elementary School shooting. It would have amended the Brady Handgun Violence Prevention Act to expand background checks to gun shows and internet purchases. Heitkamp said, "I'm going to represent my state. ... in the end it's not what any other senator believes. It's about what the people of North Dakota believe."

Polling suggested that the majority of North Dakotans approve of prohibiting individuals on the No-Fly list from buying firearms and ammunition, but in June 2016, after the Orlando nightclub shooting, Heitkamp voted against such a prohibition. She was the only Democratic senator to do so. She instead expressed support for a "compromise gun bill" proposed by Susan Collins.

Her vote against expanded background checks for gun buyers angered many, including former White House chief of staff William M. Daley, who "was so enraged he wrote a blistering attack in the Washington Post asking for his $2,500 campaign donation back."

Heitkamp declined to participate in the Democratic filibuster on gun control in June 2016, leading to harsh criticism by gun control groups such as the Brady Campaign and Center to Prevent Gun Violence and Everytown for Gun Safety.

=== Energy and environment ===
According to Reuters, Heitkamp "has been a supporter of domestic energy development, both in fossil fuels and renewable resources." She has said that she supports the Keystone XL pipeline because it will create jobs, decrease America's dependence on foreign oil from the Middle East, and help drive down the national debt. She has also said that many who oppose hydraulic fracturing have been exposed to "junk science" and do not know what it really is. She was Climate Hawks Vote's lowest-rated Democratic senator on climate leadership in the 113th Congress and remains among the lowest in 2015.

In December 2016, Heitkamp told CNBC that although the Army Corps of Engineers had refused to approve permits needed to complete the Dakota Access pipeline, that would change under Trump. She said that she understood those who opposed the construction of the pipeline through Native American land, but added: "I just think that this fight is not winnable."

In February 2017, Heitkamp was one of two Democratic senators to vote to confirm Scott Pruitt as Administrator of the Environmental Protection Agency. In March 2017, she issued a statement supporting Trump's approval of Keystone XL, calling it "common sense". She also voted against the Stream Protection Rule.

== Personal life ==
Heitkamp is married to Darwin Lange, a family practitioner. They reside in Mandan and have two adult children, Ali and Nathan. Heitkamp survived a bout with breast cancer in 2000. She is a member of the Catholic Church.

Heitkamp has said, "I think certain people in my party know me pretty well and I'm too old to change. I would have a hard time figuring out how I would not say what I really thought at this point in my life. I always say, don't ever get between a post-menopausal woman and [what she thinks is] a good idea."

== Electoral history ==
North Dakota gubernatorial election, 2000
Party	Candidate	Votes	%	±%
Republican	John Hoeven	159,255	55.03%	−11.16%
Democratic–NPL	Heidi Heitkamp	130,144	44.97%	+11.16%
Write-in		13	0.00%	
Majority		29,111	10.06%	−22.32%
Turnout		289,412		
Republican hold		Swing		

United States Senate election in North Dakota, 2012
Party	Candidate	Votes	%	±%
Democratic–NPL	Heidi Heitkamp	161,337	50.24%	−18.58%
Republican	Rick Berg	158,401	49.32%	+19.79%
Write-in		1,406	0.44%	N/A
Total votes		321,144	100.0%	N/A
Democratic–NPL hold				

Democratic primary results, North Dakota 2018
Party	Candidate	Votes	%
Democratic–NPL	Heidi Heitkamp (incumbent)	36,729	99.58%
Write-in		152	0.42%
Total votes		36,883	100%

United States Senate election in North Dakota, 2018
Party	Candidate	Votes	%	±%
Republican	Kevin Cramer	179,720	55.11%	+5.79%
Democratic–NPL	Heidi Heitkamp (incumbent)	144,376	44.27%	−5.97%
Write-in		2,042	0.63%	N/A
Total votes		326,138	100%	N/A
Republican gain from Democratic–NPL				

== See also ==
- List of female state attorneys general in the United States
- Women in the United States Senate

Party political offices
Preceded by Jim Engel	Democratic nominee for North Dakota State Auditor; 1984	Succeeded by Steve Pederson
First	Democratic nominee for Tax Commissioner of North Dakota; 1988	Succeeded by Robert E. Hanson
Preceded by Nicholas Spaeth	Democratic nominee for Attorney General of North Dakota; 1992, 1996	Succeeded by Glenn Pomeroy
Preceded by Lee Kaldor	Democratic nominee for Governor of North Dakota; 2000	Succeeded by Joe Satrom
Preceded by Kent Conrad	Democratic nominee for U.S. Senator from North Dakota (Class 1); 2012, 2018	Succeeded by Katrina Christiansen
Political offices
Preceded by Kent Conrad	Tax Commissioner of North Dakota; 1986–1992	Succeeded by Robert Hanson
Legal offices
Preceded by Nicholas Spaeth	Attorney General of North Dakota; 1992–2000	Succeeded by Wayne Stenehjem
U.S. Senate
Preceded by Kent Conrad	U.S. Senator (Class 1) from North Dakota; 2013–2019; Served alongside: John Hoeven	Succeeded by Kevin Cramer
U.S. order of precedence (ceremonial)
Preceded by Cory Gardner as Former U.S. Senator	Order of precedence of the United States	Succeeded by Mitt Romney as Former U.S. Senator
