= Jason Heitkamp =

American politician

Member of the North Dakota Senate from the 26th district
- In office December 1, 2020 – December 1, 2022
- Preceded by: Jim Dotzenrod
- Succeeded by: Dale Patten

Personal details
- Born: Wyndmere, North Dakota, U.S.
- Party: Republican
- Relations: Heidi Heitkamp (cousin); Joel Heitkamp (cousin)
- Education: North Dakota State University (BS, MA)

Jason Heitkamp is an American politician who served as a member of the North Dakota Senate from the 26th district.

== Early life and education ==
Heitkamp was born in Wyndmere, North Dakota. He earned a Bachelor of Science degree in agricultural economics and a Master of Arts in agricultural economics and business from North Dakota State University.

== Career ==
Heitkamp worked as a truck driver. He also founded Phoenix Financial, an insurance and financial services company. He was a member of the Richland County Park Board, Bottineau City Council, Prairie Rose City Council, and Richland County, North Dakota Commission. Heitkamp was elected to the North Dakota Senate in November 2020 and assumed office on December 1, 2020.

== Personal life ==
Heitkamp is a cousin of former U.S. Senator Heidi Heitkamp and former State Senator Joel Heitkamp.
