= Joel Heitkamp =

American politician

Member of the North Dakota Senate from the 26th district
- In office 1994–2008
- Preceded by: Jim Dotzenrod
- Succeeded by: Jim Dotzenrod

Personal details
- Born: Joel Curtis Heitkamp; November 2, 1961 (age 64) Breckenridge, Minnesota, U.S.
- Party: Democratic (NPL)
- Spouse: Susan
- Relatives: Heidi Heitkamp (sister); Jason Heitkamp (cousin)

Joel Curtis Heitkamp (born November 2, 1961) is an American talk radio host and politician who served as a member of the North Dakota Senate for the 26th district from 1994 to 2008.

== Education ==
Heitkamp was born in Breckenridge, Minnesota and raised in Hankinson, North Dakota, where he graduated from Hankinson High School. He also attended the University of North Dakota.

== Career ==
Heitkamp managed the Southeast Water Users District in Mantador, North Dakota. He served as a member of the North Dakota Senate from 1994 to 2008, representing the 26th district. During his final term in the State Senate, Heitkamp served as chair of the Commission on Alternatives to Incarceration.

=== Talk radio ===
Heitkamp has worked as a talk show host. He was host of KFGO's News and Views program (replacing, and later being replaced by, Ed Schultz), and now hosts the Joel Heitkamp Show on KFGO, KLXX, and KCJB.

On February 18, 2008, Heitkamp announced on his radio program that he would not be a candidate for re-election in 2008 due to Federal Communications Commission rules regarding equal-time for candidates of the opposite party.

== Personal life ==
On October 15, 2020, Heitkamp announced that he tested positive for COVID-19 following the onset of the disease's typical symptoms.

His sister, Heidi Heitkamp, is the former junior U.S. Senator from North Dakota, serving from 2013 to 2019, and former attorney general of North Dakota. His cousin, Jason Heitkamp, is also a member of the North Dakota Senate.
