= Poorna Jagannathan =

Indian-American actress (born 1972)

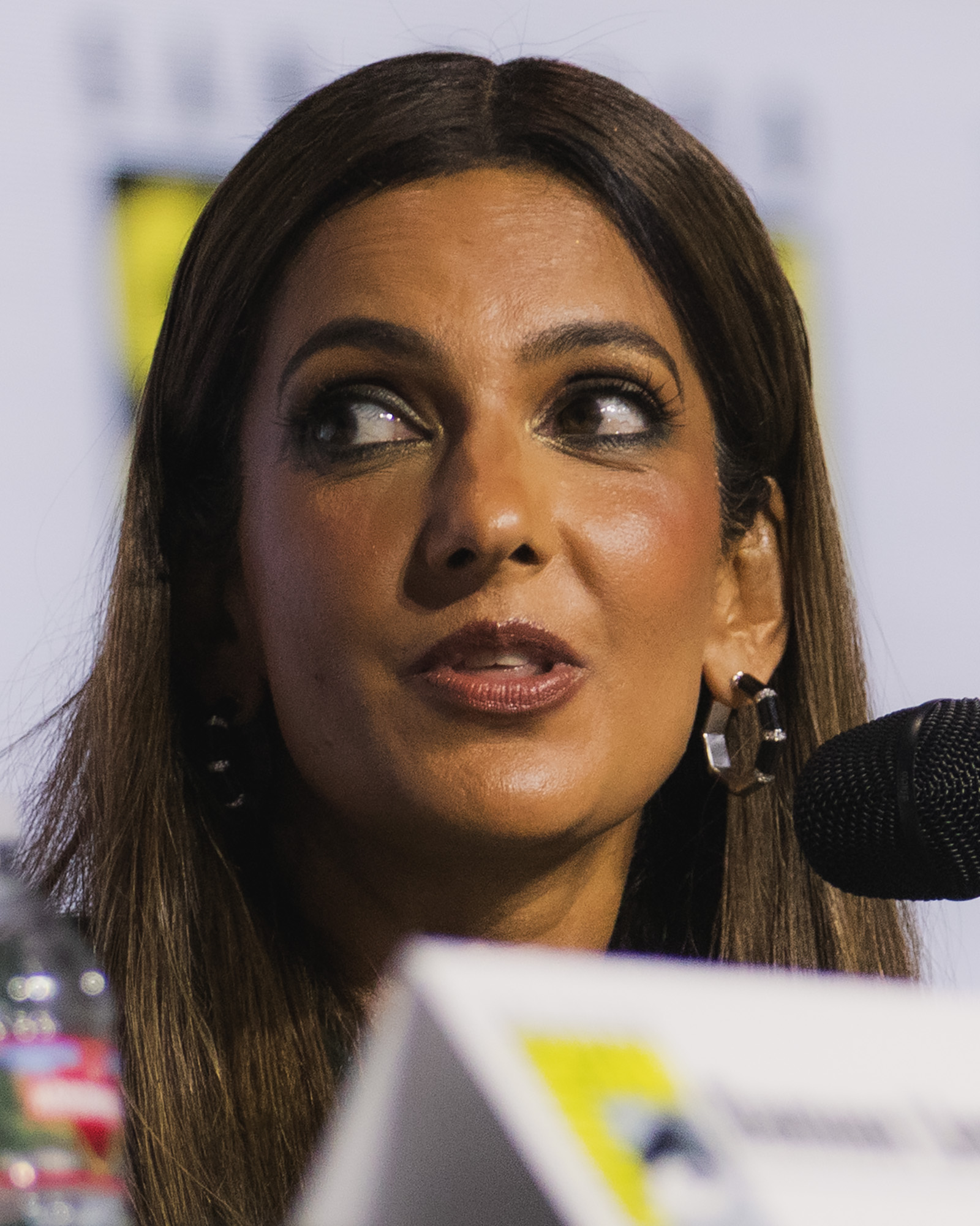
- Jagannathan in 2026
- Born: December 22, 1972 (age 53); Tunis, Tunisia
- Citizenship: United States
- Education: University of Brasília (attended); University of Maryland, College Park (BA); Pace University (attended)
- Occupation: Actress
- Years active: 2001–present
- Spouse: Azad Oommen (m. 2003)
- Children: 1

Poorna Jagannathan (/ˈpɔːrnə ˌdʒɑːɡəˈnɑːθən/ POR-nə JAH-gə-NAH-thən; born December 22, 1972) is an Indian-American producer and actress. She is known for her portrayal of Safar Khan in the HBO drama miniseries The Night Of as well as for her role as Nalini Vishwakumar in the Netflix teen comedy series Never Have I Ever. She also portrayed Lucky in the Hulu crime comedy series Deli Boys and Zoe Macon in the DC Universe series Lanterns.

Poorna also co-conceived, produced, and acted in the play Nirbhaya, which was considered "one of the most powerful and urgent pieces of human rights theatre ever made," and is regarded as a critical moment in India's history of women's empowerment.

Poorna was named among the "Top 100 Most Impactful Asians" in America in 2021, 2022 and 2025 by Goldhouse. People magazine featured her in their 2024 “The Beautiful Issue” while Verve magazine named her among the top 50 most powerful women in India in 2014.

== Early life ==
Poorna was born on December 22, 1972 in Tunis, Tunisia, to Vasantha Krishnan and G. Jagannathan. Her father, G. Jagannathan, was an Indian diplomat working at the Indian diplomatic mission to Tunisia.

She grew up in India, Pakistan, Ireland, Brazil and Argentina, and speaks Tamil, Hindi, English, Spanish and Portuguese. Poorna studied at the Sardar Patel Vidyalaya in Delhi and attended the University of Brasília before graduating in journalism from the University of Maryland, College Park. She earned a scholarship to pursue a Master of Fine Arts in acting at the Actors Studio Drama School at Pace University, but dropped out after the first year. Poorna went on to train at The Barrow Group where she is currently a board and company member. Before her career as an actor, Poorna spent 15 years working in advertising at agencies like TBWA\Worldwide, Ogilvy, and Deutsch Inc. before starting her own consultancy, Cowgirls & Indians. She quit her advertising career and focused solely on acting in 2016.

== Career ==
Poorna has had recurring parts on several TV shows like Big Little Lies, Better Call Saul and Ramy. She played Blacklister #44 on The Blacklist, and appeared as the guest lead on Law & Order: Special Victims Unit for its 18th year's double-season-finale episodes. In 2017, she played one of the leads in A24's film Share. Share premiered at the 2019 Sundance Film Festival, and was immediately acquired by HBO.

Poorna also won critical acclaim for her role as a journalist in the 2011 Hindi cinema film Delhi Belly. The Village Voice said that "the most enjoyably subversive element is Poorna Jagannathan as the self-sufficient bachelorette who waylays Tashi on his way to the altar. Rangy, corkscrew-haired, with a wary demeanor that can't long be upset by anything, she's a happy departure from the usual run of Xeroxed, pedestaled beauties." Mumbai Mirror said, "Poorna Jagannathan, an offbeat choice, is remarkably subtle and does a brilliant job." The Daily News and Analysis said that Poorna shines in the film, and that "her bohemian sex appeal" is "a refreshing change from the prim and proper 'heroine' we are used to watching." The editor of Outlook Lounge said that Poorna's performance was a "masterclass in effortless acting." In 2019, Delhi Belly was named one of the top 25 Bollywood movies of the decade by Film Companion.

In 2012, Deadline reported that Poorna had joined the cast of the HBO show The Night Of as a series regular. Her performance in The Night Of received rave reviews. Vinnie Mancuso of Observer wrote, "Poorna Jagannathan, who has been putting in one of the year's most heartbreaking performances, continues to shine..." Vikram Murthi from Vulture wrote "Poorna Jagannathan's subtle performance really shines... Her facial reactions convey such a profound array of emotions." Variety's Sonia Saraiya wrote that her performance was "quietly devastating".

While lauded for her dramatic performance, Poorna's comedic roles have gained her the most attention. Her performance as Nalini Vishwakumar in Mindy Kaling's Never Have I Ever was lauded by critics. Her portrayal of an Indian immigrant woman has been regarded as groundbreaking and a first for television. Sonia Saraiya from Vanity Fair said, "I've seen a lot of actors attempt to flesh out the stereotypically demanding Indian mom, but I've never seen anyone do it as well as Jagannathan does... It's the little things: the nearly untraceable Indian accent, the mumbled exclamations in a different language, the slight gestures and paranoiac side-eyes of the Indian aunty, the seemingly effortless bridging of the paradox between ancient tradition and modern necessity." Jinal Bhatt from Mashable.com wrote, "Poorna Jagannathan has been a revelation in this series, and I'd say she puts forth one of the best portrayals of Indian-American mothers we’ve seen." Never Have I Ever, which debuted in 2020, went on to win the People's Choice Awards for seasons 1, 2 and 3 consecutively.

As soon as Never Have I Ever concluded its four-year run, Poorna booked her next breakthrough lead role as Lucky in the critically acclaimed comedy, Deli Boys. While Deli Boys Season 1 debuted to a 96% Rotten Tomatoes score, Season 2 debuted to an impressive 100% Rotten Tomatoes score. Proma Khosla from IndieWire said, “Not enough can be said about Poorna Jagannathan as the foul-mouthed, gun-toting Lucky (truthfully, no more fearsome than the average aunty, except she’s packing heat) who commands every deal and frame, often in a leather jumpsuit. She may have plenty of experience playing moms, but make no mistake: She is mother.” Saloni Gajjar from AV Club said, “Lucky (Never Have I Ever’s Poorna Jagannathan in another scene-stealing performance) is … exceptional here. She aces her comic timing and dialogue delivery, whether it’s cursing in Hindi, doling out menacing threats, or doing bouts of physical comedy. The few times Lucky’s maternal instincts kick in, she’s expressive and emotional with the boys. (Episode six, in particular, is a highlight in this regard.) And it’s worth tuning in just for her turn and kickass outfits.” For her performance as Lucky, Poorna won the 2025 Gotham Award for Outstanding Supporting Actor in a Comedy Series and was nominated for a 2026 Film Independent Spirit Award. Season 2 of Deli Boys released on May 29th, 2026 and once again, critics called Poorna a standout. Nandini Balial from RogerEbert.com said, “‘… this is, and has always been, the Lucky show. There is no emotion, no physical comedy routine, no action setpiece, to which Jagannathan is not wholly committed. Whether she weepingly calls a jailed Raj “my gaajar ka halwa” (“my carrot pudding”) or dismissively waves a terrified couple’s therapist back into a chair with her “emotional support gun,” Jagannathan is in complete command of “Deli Boys.” It helps that Cailey Breneman’s costumes land Lucky in the femme fatale hall of fame: animal prints, gorgeous leather purses, elegant silk jumpsuits, but everything with a little bit of edge, a little danger, a little metal, just like Lucky.’” Leila Latif from Hyphen said, “The current TV landscape has no shortage of formidable anti-heroines, but few are as entertaining as a woman capable of running a crime syndicate, punching her way out of a building and still finding time to judge everybody else’s fashion choices. Lucky remains the fiercest (in both senses of the word) person in every room she enters. Jagannathan plays her with such conviction that even the show’s most outrageous acts of badassery feel entirely plausible.”

In early 2025, Poorna joined the cast of DC Studios' Lanterns for HBO in the recurring role of Zoe. Lanterns was released in August 2026. In 2025, she joined the cast of the “Nocturne”, a “Joona Linna” adaptation from Apple TV releasing late 2026.

Poorna has lent her voice to three podcasts in the Good Night Stories for Rebel Girls series, based on The New York Times Best Seller list books by Elena Favilli and Francesca Cavallo. She read the stories of Mary Kom, Margaret Hamilton and Madam C. J. Walker. The series was named among the 50 best podcasts for 2018 by Time and won the 2019 People's Choice Podcast Award in the Education category.

=== Nirbhaya ===
Moved by a gang rape and murder in Delhi on December 16, 2012, Poorna initiated, produced, and acted in a testimonial play called Nirbhaya (transl. Fearless, a pseudonym given to the victim). The play uses the rape and death of Jyoti Singh Pandey to break the silence around sexual violence. She collaborated with internationally acclaimed playwright and director, Yaël Farber, to build the play. Nirbhaya opened at the Assembly Hall in August 2013 during the Edinburgh Fringe Festival. It won the coveted 2013 Amnesty International Award as well as the Scotsman Fringe First and Herald Angel Awards, and received favorable reviews from leading publications.

The Sunday Herald called Nirbhaya "one of the most powerful and urgent pieces of human rights theatre ever made". In March 2014, Nirbhaya was the centrepiece performance for Southbank's "Women of the World" festival where it played to sold-out houses in the United Kingdom. After a successful Kickstarter campaign to fund an India tour, Nirbhaya opened to critical acclaim in India in March 2014, playing to sold-out houses in Mumbai, Delhi, and Bangalore. In August 2014, The Guardian audiences voted Nirbhaya among the top 10 "best fringe moments" in the Edinburgh Festival's history. Nirbhaya opened to rave reviews at The Culture Project in New York City in May 2015, and rose to become The New York Times Critics' Pick. The play toured for three years in multiple cities in Ireland, Canada, India, the UK, and the United States. Some reviewers stated that it was one of the most political and deeply moving pieces of theater ever made. Nirbhaya is considered one of the most impactful moments in India's history of the women's empowerment movement.

== Filmography ==
Key
| † | Denotes productions that have not yet been released |

=== Film ===
| Year | Title | Role | Notes |
|---|---|---|---|
| 2004 | She Hate Me | Song's Girlfriend | |
| 2005 | The Weather Man | NY Pedestrian | |
| 2007 | Awake | Dr. Neyer's Nurse | |
| 2007 | Montclair | Dr. Blight | |
| 2009 | Karma Calling | Quality Control Supervisor | |
| 2011 | Peace, Love & Misunderstanding | Mira | |
| 2011 | Delhi Belly | Menaka Vashisht | Hindi film |
| 2012 | Thanks for Sharing | Dr. Kazhani | |
| 2013 | Yeh Jawaani Hai Deewani | Riana | Hindi film |
| 2015 | Growing Up Smith | Nalini Bhatnagar | |
| 2016 | Carrie Pilby | Fliss | |
| 2017 | The Circle | Dr. Villalobos | |
| 2017 | Daisy Winters | Annabel Kumar | |
| 2018 | Mile 22 | United States Ambassador Dorothy Brady | |
| 2018 | An Actor Prepares | Dr. Fisher | |
| 2018 | The Dead Center | Sarah Grey | |
| 2019 | Share | Kerri | |
| 2020 | Alia's Birth | Jaime | |
| 2022 | I'll Show You Mine | Priya Sura | |
| 2022 | House Comes With a Bird | Langley | Short film |
| 2023 | The Out-Laws | Rehan | |
| 2024 | Turtles All the Way Down | Dr. Singh | |
| 2024 | Wolfs | June | |
| 2024 | Goodrich | Dr. Verma | |
| 2026 | See You When I See You | Dr. Anya | |

=== Television ===
| Year | Title | Role | Notes |
|---|---|---|---|
| 2004 | Law & Order | Rehana Khemlani | Episode: "Veteran's Day" |
| 2005 | Jonny Zero | Dr. Shamira | Episode: "Who's Your Daddy" |
| 2005 | Starved | PJ | Episode: "The Breatharians" |
| 2006 | Love Monkey | Director | Episode: "Confidence" |
| 2006 | Rescue Me | Dr. Klein | Episode: "Satisfaction" |
| 2006 | Law & Order: Criminal Intent | Dr. Sikh | Episode: "Blind Spot" |
| 2008 | The Game | Dr. Diamond | Episode: "Just the Three of Us" |
| 2009 | Numb3rs | Tech #1 | Episode: "Con Job" |
| 2010–2011 | Royal Pains | Saya | 2 episodes |
| 2015 | House of Cards | Dr. Lanjawni | Episode: "Chapter 27" |
| 2016 | NCIS: Los Angeles | Dr. Nitya Agarwal | Episode: "Core Values" |
| 2016 | Rizzoli & Isles | Mrs. Jalbani | Episode: "Dangerous Curve Ahead" |
| 2016 | The Night Of | Safar Khan | 7 episodes |
| 2017 | Law & Order: Special Victims Unit | Maya Samra | 2 episodes |
| 2017 | Gypsy | Larin Inamdar | 10 episodes |
| 2017 | Room 104 | Divya (voice) | Episode: "The Internet" |
| 2017 | The Blacklist | Nirah Ahmad | Episode: "The Endling (No. 44)" |
| 2018 | Taken | Judith Chapman | Episode: "ACGT" |
| 2018 | Better Call Saul | Dr. Maureen Bruckner | 2 episodes |
| 2018 | Sorry for Your Loss | Therapist | Episode: "17 Unheard Messages" |
| 2019 | The Act | Dr. Lakshmi Chandra | Episode: "Teeth" |
| 2019 | Ramy | Salma | 2 episodes |
| 2019 | Big Little Lies | Katie Richmond | 3 episodes |
| 2020 | Messiah | Sanjana Mirza | 3 episodes |
| 2020 | Defending Jacob | Elizabeth Vogel | 4 episodes |
| 2020 | The Wilds | Rana Jadmani | Episode: "Day Seven" |
| 2020–2023 | Never Have I Ever | Dr. Nalini Vishwakumar | 40 episodes |
| 2021–2023 | Ten Year Old Tom | Rahul's Mom (voice) | 6 episodes |
| 2025–2026 | Deli Boys | Naveeda "Lucky" | Main role |
| 2026 | Lanterns | Zoe Macon/The Manhunter | Recurring role |
| 2026 | Nobody Wants This | Eleanor | Episode: "Brian's Wedding" |
| 2026 | Nocturne † | Quinn | Post-production |

== Accolades ==
| Award | Year | Work | Category | Result | Ref. |
|---|---|---|---|---|---|
| Edinburgh Festival Fringe | 2013 | Delhi Belly | Scotsman Fringe First Award | Won | |
| Gotham TV Awards | 2025 | Deli Boys | Outstanding Supporting Performance in a Comedy Series | Won | |
| Independent Spirit Awards | 2026 | Deli Boys | Best Supporting Performance in a New Scripted Series | Nominated | |
| Screen Awards | 2012 | Delhi Belly | Best Female Debut | Nominated | |
| Screen Awards | 2012 | Delhi Belly | Best Supporting Actress | Nominated | |
| Stardust Award | 2012 | Delhi Belly | Stardust Award for Best Supporting Actress | Won | |
| Zee Cine Awards | 2012 | Delhi Belly | Best Female Debut | Won | |

=== Other awards and honors ===
- For her performance in Delhi Belly, Poorna won the L'Oreal Femina Award for Breakthrough Performance in 2012.
- Poorna was named among the top 100 Most Impactful Asians in 2021, 2022 and 2025 by Goldhouse.
- In 2014, Verve magazine named Poorna among the top 50 most powerful women in India.
- Italian Marie Claire named Poorna as one of the 12 women from the East impacting Western cinema in 2012.
- Poorna is a brand ambassador for People for the Ethical Treatment of Animals (PETA).
