= Marie (2020 film) =

2020 short film by Sam Abbas

- Directed by: Sam Abbas
- Written by: Sam Abbas
- Produced by: Sam Abbas; Tatiana Bears; Nicole Townsend
- Cinematography: Soledad Rodriguez
- Edited by: Sam Abbas
- Release date: August 10, 2020 (IGTV)
- Running time: 6 minutes
- Country: United States
- Language: English

Marie is a 2020 short documentary film directed by Sam Abbas about labor during homebirths. The film was originally scheduled for an April 2020 theatrical window for Academy consideration; however, it premiered exclusively on IGTV August 10, 2020 due to the COVID cancellation of all theaters in New York City. Based on the 93rd Academy Awards' new rules to offset the COVID interruptions, Marie was eligible and running for a nomination.

== Plot ==
An observation of labor during a home-birth.

=== Subjects ===
- Marie Brewer (Mother)
- Daniel Bauer (Father)
- Takiya S. Ballard (Midwife)

== Filming ==
Abbas stated during a Columbia Global Centers panel that part of what he was going to be working on is a short documentary focusing only on labor during a homebirth making it very different from Alia's Birth where he shows the delivery of a baby during a home-birth. Both projects where shot at the same time and with the same crew.

== Reception ==
Alan Ng of Film Threat gave the film a 7 out of 10 and wrote, "If anything, Marie is an experience, a very real experience of the moments before life begins."

Chris Buick of the London-based UK Film Review, in their positive review, wrote, "Ultimately what Abbas wants to do is make us vicariously feel, if only an infinitesimal amount, some of what Marie feels. Abbas really tries to get across the ebbs and flows of the labour process, the uncensored discomfort, endurance and stamina involved with any birth, let alone one stretched out over two-and-a-half days, something very rarely depicted so vehemently in cinema."
