= Alexis Zabé =

Mexican cinematographer

- Born: Alexis Zabé; June 4, 1970 (age 56); Mexico City, Mexico
- Education: National Autonomous University of Mexico
- Occupation: Cinematographer
- Years active: 1994–present
- Organization(s): Mexican Society of Cinematographers; American Society of Cinematographers
- Awards: Ariel Award for Best Cinematography; 2005 Duck Season; 2008 Silent Light
- Website: https://www.alexiszabe.com/

Alexis Zabé, AMC, ASC, (born June 4, 1970) is a Mexican cinematographer who studied at the Centro Universitario de Estudios Cinematográficos. He is best known for his work on films such as Silent Light and The Florida Project. Zabé is known to work frequently with directors Fernando Eimbcke and Carlos Reygadas. He is a member of both the Mexican Society of Cinematographers and the American Society of Cinematographers. Zabé is currently attached to several films including Erēmīta (Anthologies), directed by Sam Abbas.

== Early life ==
As a teenager born in Mexico City, Zabé would go to local-second run theaters where they would run a different film every day. His father was a photographer so Zabé grew up around images and cameras. He believes his love for photography is "genetic" and that his incline towards cinematography is very natural. This natural love for photography and cinema led him to attend the Centro Universitario de Estudios Cinematográficos. While studying he met future director Fernando Eimbcke and the two became friends, having shot different short films together. After graduating, Zabé realized that Mexico's cinematic industry panorama was not promising since the country was going through a severe economic crisis that had an impact on the almost zero production of films in those years. Because of this, Zabé and the people of his same generation took refuge in other audiovisual aspects such as video clips, commercials and TV programs.

== Filmography ==
Year	Title	Director	Notes
2004	Duck Season	Fernando Eimbcke	
2007	Silent Light	Carlos Reygadas	
2008	Lake Tahoe	Fernando Eimbcke	
2012	Post Tenebras Lux	Carlos Reygadas	
2017	The Florida Project	Sean Baker	
2018	Tyrel	Sebastián Silva	
2018	Fistful of Dirt	Sebastián Silva	
2021	Erēmīta (Anthologies)	Self, Sam Abbas, and others.	
2023	Tuesday	Daina O. Pusic	
