= Rebel Girls =

American children's media publisher

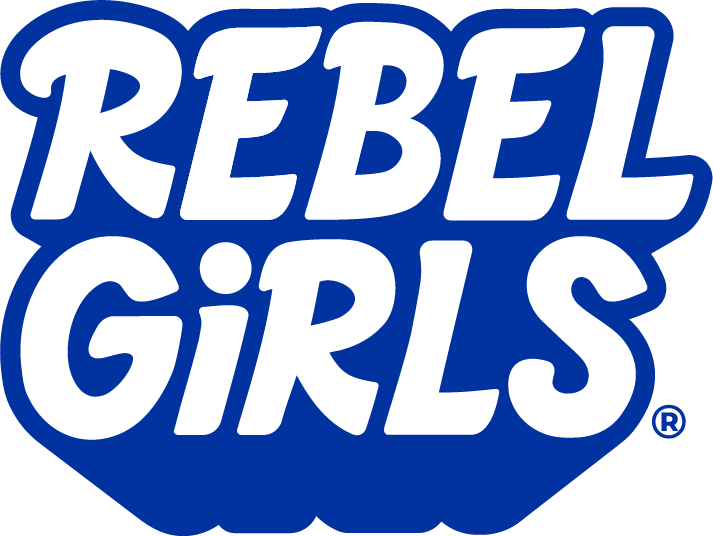
- Founded: 2016; 10 years ago
- Founder: Elena Favilli
- Headquarters location: Los Angeles, California
- Distribution: Worldwide
- Publication types: Children's book publisher, digital media
- Nonfiction topics: Feminism, girl empowerment,
- Fiction genres: Non-fiction
- Official website: www.rebelgirls.com

Rebel Girls is an American digital media company and children's book publisher founded by Elena Favilli, and Francesca Cavallo co-authors of the Good Night Stories for Rebel Girls series. Francesca Cavallo parted ways with Rebel Girls in 2019. The company produces content that focuses on the biographies of women from all over the world, and throughout history.

== Literary works ==
- Good Night Stories for Rebel Girls Volume 1 by Elena Favilli and Francesca Cavallo
- Good Night Stories for Rebel Girls Volume 2 by Francesca Cavallo and Elena Favilli
- I am a Rebel Girl: A Journal to start revolutions by Francesca Cavallo and Elena Favilli
- Madam C.J. Walker Builds a Business
- Ada Lovelace Cracks the Code
- Junko Tabei Masters the Mountains
- Wangari Maathai Plants a Forest
- Alicia Alonso Takes the Stage

In October 2020, Rebel Girls published the third installment in its original series, Good Night Stories for Rebel Girls: 100 Immigrant Women Who Changed the World, authored by Elena Favilli.

== Podcast ==
Rebel Girls produces a podcast, Good Night Stories for Rebel Girls: The Podcast. Every episode features the story of a woman from Good Night Stories for Rebel Girls, narrated by notable women like Melinda Gates, Priscilla Chan, Jameela Jamil, and Tarana Burke.

== Awards ==
- 2019 People's Choice Podcast Awards, Number One in Education
- 2020 Corporate Content Awards, Bronze, Best Use of Content in a Social Context
