= Sam Abbas =

Egyptian-American film director, screenwriter, and producer

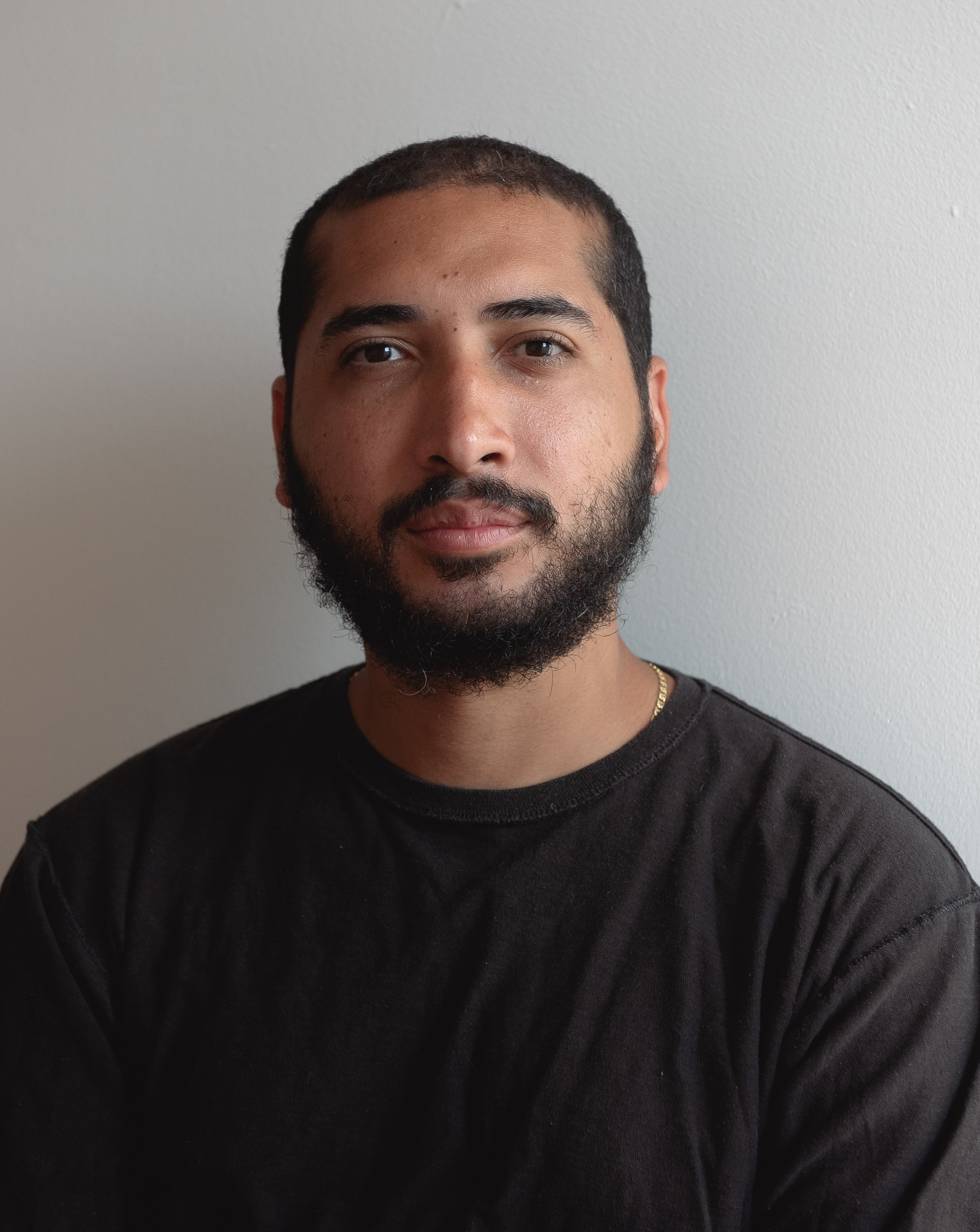
- Abbas at the Museum of Modern Art
- Born: 11 November 1993 (age 32); Alexandria, Egypt
- Occupations: Film director, screenwriter, actor, producer
- Notable work: Europe's New Faces, The Wedding, Alia's Birth, Marie
- Website: https://samabbasfilms.com

Sam Abbas (Arabic: سام عباس; born 11 November 1993) is an Egyptian-American film director, screenwriter, and producer. He is noted for his artfully composed, poetic, and incident-light tableaus film style.

== Career ==
Prior to his first feature, Abbas's short film Time to Come was labeled as "a really powerful project," by LogoTV.

In 2018, Abbas executive produced Lavender by Matthew Puccini which screened at the 2019 Sundance Film Festival followed by the 2019 SXSW. The film was immediately picked up by Fox Searchlight Pictures, making it one of the first films bought at Sundance that year.

The Hollywood Reporter exclusively released the trailer for Abbas' first full-length feature, The Wedding, in August 2018. Immediately after the trailer's release, the film was called, "the queer movie that could make waves in the Middle East" and "a film that will make a fuss in theaters". In November 2018 the film was released theatrically and secretly throughout the Middle East.

Abbas' Alia's Birth, his second full-length feature, received attention following the announcement of a female-driven short film contest in which the winner gets to have their film included within the narrative. The film stars Nikohl Boosheri, Poorna Jagannathan, Samuel H. Levine and Maya Kazan. In May 2020, The Hollywood Reporter released a first-look of the feature with major information. The film premiered on August 26, 2021.

On July 13, 2020, Abbas released a 2.5 minute short documentary, Rusted Caravaggios, about the first public invitation to the Louvre Museum (Monday July 6, 2020) following an unprecedented four-month closure.

Shortly after Variety revealed that Abbas had teamed with leading cinematographers from around the world to create the documentary Erēmīta (Anthologies). The anthology of shorts composed during the 2020 pandemic was both produced and curated by Abbas.

A few years later, Deadline separately unveiled two projects: a short film, Obstaculum, and a feature film, Europe's New Faces, both focused on migration. Abbas took on all roles, directing, producing, photographing, and editing both films. The short film was released on November 27, 2024, on YouTube, capturing people from the Ivory Coast, Gambia, Senegal, Sudan, Chad, Eritrea, and Ethiopia as they attempt to occupy an abandoned art school in Paris. The film explored the human implication of these illegal occupations from the side of both the migrants and the police.

The feature, Europe's New Faces, was revealed on January 15, 2025, with a first look that included information about the music, composed by filmmaker and composer Bertrand Bonello, known for his work on The Beast and Saint Laurent. The film premiered at the Museum of Modern Art Feb 28th, 2025. Murtada Elfadl of Variety gave the film a positive review writing, “The painstaking detail in which Abbas crafts this story is certainly powerful."

== ArabQ ==
In 2018, Abbas launched ArabQ, the first Arab-based film production company focusing on movies with LGBTQ themes, during the 68th Berlin International Film Festival. ArabQ launched with Abbas' feature film debut, The Wedding, which he wrote, directed, and starred in alongside Nikohl Boosheri. Abbas placed the company in Egypt to encourage more queer cinema with Middle East ties.

The company closed in 2020.

== Filmography ==
=== Film ===
Year	Film	Functioned as					Notes
Year	Film	Director	Writer	Producer	Cinematographer	Actor	Notes
2016	Time to Come	Yes	Yes	Yes		Yes	
2018	I want more, I want less					Yes	
2018	The Wedding	Yes	Yes	Yes		Yes	
2019	Lavender			Yes			Executive producer
2020	Marie	Yes		Yes			Was eligible for the 93rd Academy Awards
2020	Alia's Birth	Yes	Yes	Yes			
2020	Rusted Caravaggios	Yes			Yes		Premiered exclusively on Deadline
2021	Erēmīta (Anthologies)	Yes		Yes	Yes		
2023	Obstaculum	Yes	Yes	Yes	Yes		One-week short-film release announced on Deadline
2025	Europe's New Faces	Yes	Yes	Yes	Yes		
