= Pooya Mohseni =

Iranian-American actress

- Born: Tehran, Iran
- Occupations: Actress; LGBTQ rights activist
- Years active: 2010—Present

Pooya Mohseni is an Iranian-American actress and LGBTQ rights activist. She has appeared in various television series including Law & Order: Special Victims Unit, Madam Secretary, and The Walking Dead: Dead City. In film, she appeared in the slasher film Terrifier (2016) and starred in See You Then (2021), the latter of which garnered her critical acclaim.

== Personal life and career ==
Mohseni was born in Tehran, Iran, and moved to New York City, U.S., at the age of 18. She studied design in New York and later became an actress.

Mohseni has spoken about the harassment and discrimination she faced in Iran, including several suicide attempts due to her identity as a transgender woman. She also revealed that she faced significant discrimination in the United States as a transgender Iranian immigrant. After the legalization of same-sex marriage in the U.S. in 2015, she publicly came out as transgender. She is fluent in both Persian and English and is an active advocate for LGBTQ rights, as well as a vocal supporter of immigrant and women's issues. She also contributes to writing and consulting on LGBTQ-centric stories.

She has appeared as a guest on several TV shows including Law & Order: Special Victims Unit, Falling Water, Madam Secretary, and Big Dogs on Amazon Prime Video. In 2016, she appeared in the independent slasher film Terrifier. In 2021, she starred in the drama See You Then. Critical reviews highlighted her performance. In 2022, she wrote and starred in the 18-minute short film Transit: A New York City Fairytale. That year, she appeared in the Sanaz Toossi play English. In 2025, she appeared in three episodes of The Walking Dead: Dead City. She has contributed her voice to multiple video games including Destiny 2: The Final Shape and Hellboy: Web of Wyrd.

== Filmography ==
=== Television ===
Year	Title	Role	Notes
2011	So Damn Funny Show	Trainee; Bitchy Boss	1 episode
2013	Celebrity Ghost Stories	Nadine's Mom	1 episode
2013	Below the Line	Mina	1 episode
2014	Jus' Sayin' Productions	Mom	1 episode
2015	Madam Secretary	Samilia Mahdavi	1 episode
2016	Falling Water	Dr. Duria	3 episodes
2017	The Four Letter Word	Ghazal	2 episodes
2018	Grosse Misconduct	Alicia Castile	6 episodes
2020	Law & Order: Special Victims Unit	Judge Namazi	1 episode
2020	Big Dogs	Baijanti Divya	5 episodes
2020–2021	Rival Peak	Winter	12 episodes
2021	High Herstory	The Storyteller	1 episode
2021	Tawkin' with the Roses	Herself	1 episode
2025	The Walking Dead: Dead City	Roksana	3 episodes

=== Film ===
Year	Title	Role	Notes
2012	When Death Calls	Lorraine Castro	
2014	Bloody Subway Party	Daisy	
2014	Subways	Stephanie	
2015	Brutal Colors	Mysterious	
2015	Giorgio Bush and the B-people	Bank representative	
2015	Before the Snow	Nitya	
2016	Lucky	Prisca	
2016	Terrifier	Cat Lady	
2017	Ghost Source Zero	Newscaster	
2017	My Brother's Keeper	Madeline	
2019	Theresa & Allison	The Mysterious Woman	
2020	Lapsis	Noori Capahardi	
2020	Thorp	Frannie	
2021	See You Then	Kris Ahadi	
2021	I See You and You See Me	Sarah	
2021	Less Than or Equal To	Bailey	
2022	Remote	Ramesh	
2022	Entanglement	Allie	
2023	Nightmare Radio: The Night Stalker	Eartha	
2023	The Arrival	Jayce Fisher	
2023	Bound	Yeva	
2024	Heather	Heather	

=== Video games ===
Year	Title	Role	Notes
2022	Horizon Forbidden West	Ivinna; Sentekka	
2023	Hellboy: Web of Word	Scheherezade	
2023	Thirsty Suitors	Sound	
2024	Destiny 2: The Final Shape	Micah-10	
