= Europe's New Faces =

2025 documentary film directed by Sam Abbas

- Theatrical Film poster
- Directed by: Sam Abbas
- Produced by: Sam Abbas
- Cinematography: Sam Abbas
- Edited by: Sam Abbas
- Music by: Bertrand Bonello
- Production companies: Maxxie, Suzzee & Cinema
- Release date: February 28, 2025 (Museum of Modern Art)
- Running time: 2 hours 39 minutes
- Countries: France, Italy, Switzerland, and United States
- Languages: French, English, Arabic, Italian, Bengali

Europe's New Faces is a 2025 observational documentary film directed by Sam Abbas. The film explores the experiences of African and South Asian migrants traveling across the Mediterranean Sea from Libya and their efforts to build new lives in Europe. With a minimalist, immersive approach, Europe's New Faces offers a raw and unfiltered look at migration, integration, and survival in contemporary Europe.

== Plot ==
The documentary is divided into two distinct parts. The first segment, "Land & Integration," follows the daily lives of around 400 African immigrants living in an abandoned building in Paris. Through static shots and natural lighting, the film captures their everyday struggles, from cooking and bathing to religious practices and the looming threat of eviction. The second segment, "Sea & Passage," shifts focus to the NGO Médecins Sans Frontières rescue ship Geo Barents, documenting its efforts to save migrants crossing the Mediterranean.

== Production ==
Sam Abbas directed Europe's New Faces with an observational, minimalist approach, eschewing traditional documentary storytelling methods such as voiceover narration or talking-head interviews. The cinematography relies on static shots and natural lighting to enhance the intimate and meditative quality of the film. The score was composed by filmmaker and composer Bertrand Bonello, known for The Beast (2023) and Saint Laurent (2014), adding an atmospheric depth to the film's visual storytelling.

== Festival Release ==
Europe's New Faces premiered on February 28, 2025, at the Museum of Modern Art (MoMA) in New York as part of the institution's Doc Fortnight series. The screening marked the film's first public showing, drawing attention from critics and audiences interested in contemporary migration issues.

Critics praised Europe's New Faces for its unfiltered portrayal of the migrant experience. The film's lack of narration and interviews was noted as a powerful artistic choice, allowing viewers to engage with the subject matter without mediation. Cineuropa highlighted the film's ability to capture the nuances of displacement and survival through its restrained yet evocative cinematography. The use of Bertrand Bonello's score was also singled out as a compelling addition to the film's immersive experience. The documentary has been described as a poignant and necessary exploration of migration in Europe, offering a perspective that is often overlooked in mainstream discourse.
