= Medina Senghore =

American actress

- Born: January 12, 1977 (age 49); Cambridge, Massachusetts
- Occupation: Actress
- Years active: 2008–present

Medina Senghore is an American actress. She is best known for playing Amanda Hansen in the comedy action series Happy! and Annie Smith in the horror drama series The Walking Dead.

== Early life ==
Senghore was born in Cambridge, Massachusetts to a Gambian father and an African-American mother. She studied at Howard University where gained a bachelors in chemical engineering. She was originally planning on becoming a lawyer, gaining a degree in law at Harvard University. However she soon realised she had a love for acting and after she gained admission to Juilliard School on her first try she felt it was the universe telling her that she needed to pursue this calling.

== Career ==
Her first big role came playing Amanda Hanson in the black comedy action series Happy! starring Christopher Meloni. She has made appearances in the film Keeping Company and tv shows such as the crime drama series Dr Death and Blindspot and in the paranormal series Celebrity Ghost Stories. Her biggest role so far has been playing Annie Smith in the final season of the post-apocalyptic horror drama series The Walking Dead. She later reprised her role on the reboot series The Walking Dead: Dead City.

== Personal life ==
She met graphic designer Kareem Collie at a friend's birthday at a nightclub in 2002. She was hesitant to date him after finding out he used to dated one of her friends. After dating for around a year the two separated with Collie admitting he had a lot of growing up to do. In 2008 they crossed paths again in cafes and restaurants and eventually started dating again. Collie proposed to her on the High Line in Manhattan. They eventually tied the knot in October 2010.

== Filmography ==
=== Film ===
Year	Title	Role	Notes
2008	Life's Passing Me By	Beauty Salon Owner	
2008	Alien Uprising	Zoe	
2011	The Three Way	Dee	
2012	Clonehunter	Althea	
2019	Cap	Amelia Benett	Short
2020	The President Is Missing	Rachelle Martin	
2021	Keeping Company	Danika	
2021	Those Who Wish Me Dead	Allison	
2023	Murder City	Molly	
2024	Playing House	Hilary	Short
2026	Milquetoast	Jenn	Short

=== Television ===
Year	Title	Role	Notes
2010	Celebrity Ghost Stories	Tempestt Bledsoe	Episode; #2.3
2018	Blindspot	Agent Mackenzie	Episode; Two Legendary Chums
2017-2019	Happy	Amanda Hansen	17 episodes
2021	Dr Death	Kayla Gibson	2 episodes
2022	The Walking Dead	Annie Smith	8 episodes
2025	The Walking Dead: Dead City	Annie Smith	2 episodes
