= The Walking Dead: Dead City =

American post-apocalyptic drama television series

- Genre: Horror; Drama; Zombie apocalypse
- Created by: Eli Jorné
- Based on: The Walking Dead by: Robert Kirkman; Tony Moore; Charlie Adlard
- Showrunners: Eli Jorné (seasons 1–2); Seth Hoffman (season 3)
- Starring: Lauren Cohan; Jeffrey Dean Morgan; Gaius Charles; Željko Ivanek; Mahina Napoleon; Lisa Emery; Logan Kim; Dascha Polanco; Keir Gilchrist; Raúl Castillo; Aimee Garcia; Jimmi Simpson
- Composer: Ian Hultquist
- Country of origin: United States
- Original language: English
- No. of seasons: 3
- No. of episodes: 22

Production
- Executive producers: Scott M. Gimple; Robert Kirkman; David Alpert; Gale Anne Hurd; Brian Bockrath; Lauren Cohan; Jeffrey Dean Morgan; Eli Jorné; Colin Walsh; Michael E. Satrazemis; Seth Hoffman
- Production locations: New Jersey; Massachusetts
- Camera setup: Single-camera
- Running time: 40–50 minutes
- Production companies: Skybound Entertainment; Valhalla Entertainment; Circle of Confusion; Schneibot; AMC Studios

Original release
- Network: AMC
- Release: June 18, 2023 – present

Related
- The Walking Dead

The Walking Dead: Dead City, or simply Dead City, is an American post-apocalyptic horror drama television series created by Eli Jorné for AMC, based on The Walking Dead characters Maggie and Negan. It is the first sequel to The Walking Dead television series, and the fifth series in The Walking Dead franchise, sharing continuity with the other television series. Jorné served as showrunner for the first two seasons before departing the show and being replaced by Seth Hoffman.

Lauren Cohan and Jeffrey Dean Morgan reprise their roles as Maggie and Negan from the original television series, with Gaius Charles, Željko Ivanek, Mahina Napoleon, Lisa Emery, Logan Kim, Dascha Polanco, Keir Gilchrist, Raúl Castillo, Aimee Garcia, and Jimmi Simpson also starring. Development of the series began in March 2022, with its original title Isle of the Dead revealed that month, and renamed in August. Additional castings were announced in October and November 2022. Principal photography began in July 2022 in New Jersey and concluded in October 2022.

The first season premiered on June 18, 2023, and consists of six episodes. An eight-episode second season premiered on May 4, 2025. In July 2025, the series was renewed for an eight-episode third season, which premiered on July 26, 2026.

== Premise ==
The series follows Maggie and Negan traveling into a post-apocalyptic Manhattan cut off from the mainland in search of Maggie's kidnapped son, Hershel. The crumbling city is filled with the dead and denizens who have made New York City their own world full of chaos, danger, beauty, and terror.

== Cast and characters ==
=== Main ===
- Lauren Cohan as Maggie Greene: Glenn's widow and formerly a part of Rick Grimes' group on The Walking Dead. She is also the leader of the Bricks, a community of survivors that relocated to New York from Virginia, where it was known as the Hilltop Colony.
- Jeffrey Dean Morgan as Negan: The reformed former leader of the Saviors who left the Commonwealth with his pregnant wife to build a life together at the end of The Walking Dead.
- Gaius Charles as Perlie Armstrong: A marshal for the New Babylon Federation, a network of survivor communities in New York, who is tasked with hunting down Negan.
- Željko Ivanek as Mile Jurkovic / "The Croat": Originally from Croatia, hence his name, the Croat is a sadistic former member of the Saviors who has kidnapped Maggie's son, Hershel. He is also the leader of the Burazi (Brothers), a group of hostile survivors who have taken control of Manhattan.
- Mahina Napoleon as Ginny (seasons 1–2): A young girl under Negan's care who is selectively mute following the traumatic death of her father. It's later revealed that her father is one of the men that Negan is wanted for killing.
- Lisa Emery as "The Dama" (seasons 2–3; guest season 1): The Croat's mysterious ally.
- Logan Kim as Hershel Rhee (season 2–present; recurring season 1): Maggie and Glenn's teenage son. Kim replaces actor Kien Michael Spiller who previously portrayed Hershel on The Walking Dead.
- Dascha Polanco as Lucia Narvaez (season 2): A high-ranking marshal for New Babylon who takes part in their mission to control Manhattan.
- Keir Gilchrist as Benjamin Pierce (season 2): New Babylon's historian who documents the rebuilding of society and is fascinated by New York City.
- Raúl Castillo as Luis DeLeon (season 3): An ER doctor who mentors Hershel.
- Aimee Garcia as Renata DeLeon (season 3): The leader of a community of survivors in Manhattan and Luis' sister.
- Jimmi Simpson as Mason Dillard (season 3): An eccentric survivor who operates an abandoned bar and befriends Negan.

=== Recurring ===
- Jonathan Higginbotham as Tommaso (season 1): The co-leader of the Tribespeople, a nomadic group of survivors based in Manhattan who are being hunted by the Burazi.
- Karina Ortiz as Amaia (season 1): The co-leader of the Tribespeople and Tommaso's girlfriend.
- Kim Coates as Bruegel (season 2): The leader of the Silk Stockings, the fiercest gang in Manhattan.
- Pooya Mohseni as Roksana (season 2): The leader of the Foragers, a group of survivors who live isolated in Central Park.
- Krystina Alabado as Yvette DeLeon (season 3): Renata and Luis' pregnant sister-in-law.
- Ioana Alfonso as Solmari DeLeon (season 3): An engineer who is Renata and Luis' cousin.

=== Guest ===
- Trey Santiago-Hudson as Jano (season 1): A deputy marshal for New Babylon who assists Perlie in hunting down Negan.
- Michelle Hurd as Jones (season 1): The owner of the Easy Stay Motor Inn, who hides Negan from the New Babylon marshals.
- Michael Anthony as Luther (season 1): A physically imposing member of the Tribespeople who is distrustful of Maggie and Negan.
- Steven Ogg as Simon (season 1): The former second-in-command of the Saviors who appears in a flashback scene. Ogg reprises his role from The Walking Dead.
- Jasmin Walker as Charlie Byrd / "The Prefect" (seasons 1–2): The governor of the New Babylon Federation and Perlie's superior.
- Jake Weary as Christos (season 2): The leader of the Blood Shirts, a gang in Manhattan that uses walker bones as weapons and armor.
- Logan Schmucker as Victor (season 2): A gentle-natured violinist and reluctant member of the Burazi who develops a friendship with Negan.
- Anthony Molinari as Houseman (season 2): A high-ranking marshal for New Babylon.
- Tom Ukah as Waylen (season 2): A Burazi enforcer who is partnered with Negan.
- Medina Senghore as Annie (season 2): Negan's second wife and mother of his son Joshua, whom he sent away to protect them. Senghore reprises her role from The Walking Dead.
- Hilarie Burton as Lucille (season 2): Negan's deceased first wife who appears to him as a hallucination. Burton reprises her role from The Walking Dead.
- Scott Speiser as Bauer (season 3): The leader of a community of survivors from Belleville, who are at war with Claudia's group.
- Christine Horn as Claudia (season 3): The leader of a community of survivors from Newark, who are at war with Bauer's group.
- Michael Emery as Fabian (season 3): A member of Maggie and Renata's community and a former resident of the Bricks who struggles to provide for his family.
- Folake Olowofoyeku as The Trader (season 3): A well-connected survivor who Maggie and Luis seek out to obtain medical supplies.
- Ned Van Zandt as Gerald (season 3): The leader of a peaceful group of Presbyterian survivors.
- Emily Kinney as Beth Greene (season 3): Maggie's deceased younger sister who appears in an alternate reality where the apocalypse did not occur. Kinney reprises her role from The Walking Dead.

== Episodes ==
| Season | Episodes | Originally released | |
| Season | Episodes | First released | Last released |
|---|---|---|---|
| 1 | 6 | June 18, 2023 | July 23, 2023 |
| 2 | 8 | May 4, 2025 | June 22, 2025 |
| 3 | 8 | July 26, 2026 | September 13, 2026 |

=== Season 1 (2023) ===
| No. overall | No. in season | Title | Directed by | Written by | Original release date | U.S. viewers (millions) |
|---|---|---|---|---|---|---|
| 1 | 1 | "Old Acquaintances" | Loren Yaconelli | Eli Jorné | June 18, 2023 | 0.704 |
Following an attack on the new Hilltop, now called the Bricks, Maggie's son Hershel is kidnapped by the Croat, a former Savior living in Manhattan. Desperate to save Hershel, Maggie reluctantly tracks down Negan, who is on the run from New Babylon marshals led by Perlie Armstrong after murdering five people, for help. In exchange for Maggie giving his young companion Ginny a home at the Bricks, Negan agrees to help her with the two taking young marshal Jano hostage and Maggie having to deal with her hatred of Negan for his having murdered Glenn years ago. In Manhattan, the trio encounters walkers falling from the buildings and a cat-and-mouse game with Perlie who accidentally kills Jano while chasing after them. Elsewhere, the Croat questions Hershel for information on Negan and sends an escaped prisoner to his death after the man refuses to answer questions about his group.
| 2 | 2 | "Who's There?" | Loren Yaconelli | Eli Jorné | June 25, 2023 | 0.706 |
An old woman named Esther helps Maggie and Negan escape from a herd and leads them to her tribe of survivors who are hunted by the Croat and his people, the Burazi. Negan reveals that the Croat was one of the first Saviors, serving as an interrogator for Negan until he went too far with a young survivor, causing Negan to try to kill him. However, Negan only succeeded in blowing off the Croat's right ear and he escaped. The tribe comes under attack from the Burazi, killing several people, including Esther, before they manage to escape. In retaliation, Negan brutally kills one of the Burazi as an example to the rest, something that is witnessed by Maggie. After Maggie reveals their true mission to them, the tribe reveals that they can help her get to the Croat. Elsewhere, Ginny struggles to adapt to life at the Bricks, eventually stealing a motorcycle and running away. Perlie visits his brother Joel's apartment, only to find Joel dead of suicide. Falling into a trap outside, Perlie is captured by the Croat.
| 3 | 3 | "People Are a Resource" | Kevin Dowling | Keith Staskiewicz | July 2, 2023 | 0.681 |
In flashbacks, Negan and Ginny search for her missing toy. In the present, Ginny makes her way to Manhattan. The Croat holds Perlie prisoner in Madison Square Garden where he tests the marshal fight against walkers and questions his motives. Perlie reveals he's in Manhattan hunting for Negan, much to the Croat's shock who in turn reveals he had lost his family to cannibals near the start of the apocalypse. The tribespeople tell Maggie and Negan about the Burazi's operation which they recognize as a twisted version of the Saviors. Using the story of Negan's defeat by the Militia, Negan and Maggie inspire the tribespeople to help them. Tommaso reveals he had managed to escape the Croat using the old framework of Penn Station and the subway system which they can use to get in. Maggie opens up to Negan about the loss of Hershel and her family and Negan in turn reveals that he had sent Annie and his son Joshua to safety in Missouri after killing five men who had robbed, beaten and raped Annie, which is why he's a wanted man. Luther discovers Negan's wanted poster, leading to a fight in which Negan kills Luther. After finding Ginny's toy, Maggie contemplates burning it, secretly observed by Ginny.
| 4 | 4 | "Everybody Wins a Prize" | Kevin Dowling | Eli Jorné | July 9, 2023 | 0.697 |
In a flashback, Negan and Simon confront the Croat over his brutal murder of a young girl. In the present, Maggie and Negan lead an attack on Madison Square Garden to rescue Hershel and kill the Croat. However, the Croat anticipates their actions, and he lays a trap, evacuating his people from the arena while letting in walkers and using the sound and light systems to lead them to the tribespeople. Overwhelmed and outnumbered, most of the tribespeople are killed with only Maggie, Amaia, Tommaso, and Ginny managing to escape into the sewers. Negan confronts the Croat who joyfully greets him and tries to get Negan to join him, attempting to kill Perlie as a sign of good faith. Much to the Croat's shock, Negan saves the marshal's life and escapes with him. However, Perlie holds Negan at gunpoint, threatening him with summary execution for his crimes despite Negan having just saved his life.
| 5 | 5 | "Stories We Tell Ourselves" | Gandja Monteiro | Brenna Kouf | July 16, 2023 | 0.701 |
In flashbacks, Ginny discovers that Maggie is lying about the Bricks' grain being stolen while the Croat kidnaps Hershel and demands Negan in exchange for his return. In the present, the Croat visits the Dama who reiterates their need for Negan to protect their future. As they make their way through Manhattan, Negan and Perlie get to know each other with Negan revealing the reason for his murders. His beliefs shaken by the recent events, Perlie opens up to Negan about his brother Joel and Perlie's growing doubts about what he's doing. Maggie, who is revealed to have kept Ginny's toy rather than burning it, deduces that Tommaso had sold the tribe out, resulting in the attack on their hideout and the ambush at Madison Square Garden. Tommaso admits that he had made a deal with the Croat who had promised Tommaso a boat and a chance at a better life for his family on the mainland, horrifying Amaia, although Maggie is more sympathetic. In the sewers, Amaia and Tommaso fall victim to walkers, but Maggie and Ginny manage to escape after Maggie successfully fights a massive fused together walker. On the surface, Ginny fires a flare into the air which is spotted by Negan.
| 6 | 6 | "Doma Smo" (Note: Croatian for "We Are Home") | Gandja Monteiro | Eli Jorné | July 23, 2023 | 0.618 |
Negan follows the flare and looks for Maggie, and to his surprise, he runs into Ginny. Maggie also appears as the walkers approach. Negan wants Ginny to leave, and Perlie offers to take her away. Ginny doesn't want to go, so Negan tells her the truth about killing her father and taking care of her because she was his debt. Ginny and Perlie leave, and Negan and Maggie go find the Croat. Negan then realizes that Maggie has been lying to him and has been leading him on the wrong path all along. She didn't want his help in saving Hershel, she just wanted to trade him for him, which is what happens in the end. Perlie takes Ginny to the Bricks and returns to New Babylon, where his boss, Governor Charlie Byrd, wants to know everything about how they make methane fuel in New York. Maggie and Hershel return, but their relationship is still strained, and Maggie realizes that she may have been wrong. The Croat takes Negan to the Dama, who wants him to be their new leader, under whom they will unite New York and begin conquering more territory.

=== Season 2 (2025) ===
| No. overall | No. in season | Title | Directed by | Written by | Original release date | U.S. viewers (millions) |
|---|---|---|---|---|---|---|
| 7 | 1 | "Power Equals Power" | Michael E. Satrazemis | Eli Jorné | May 4, 2025 | 0.378 |
A year has passed since Maggie returned from New York. The Bricks has been forced to join the New Babylon Federation while Maggie has been trying to move on with her life with Hershel and Ginny. The newly promoted Colonel Perlie Armstrong and Governor Charlie Byrd, arrive at the Bricks, seeking to conscript the residents for an "expeditionary mission" to Manhattan to retake the city, hanging a man who tried to flee. Privately, Perlie admits that New Babylon's ethanol supply has been compromised by a moth infestation, and they are preparing an invasion to get the Burazi's methane. Maggie makes a deal where she volunteers to go in exchange for everyone else being left alone. Joined by Ginny, Maggie proves herself against a herd of walkers, but this causes friction with Hershel who accuses his mother of going back for Negan while dodging her questions about the Dama. In Manhattan, Negan refuses the Dama's attempts to get him to help, causing her to intimidate Negan by arranging for his wife Annie and son Joshua to arrive in the city, which will give her leverage over Negan. Negan finally agrees to help and is given a new upgraded version of Lucille. Negan gives a speech to the three rival gangs ruling Uptown Manhattan, attempting to unite them against the coming invasion.
| 8 | 2 | "Another Shitty Lesson" | Michael E. Satrazemis | Zoe Vitale | May 11, 2025 | 0.278 |
As the New Babylon forces prepare to set sail for Manhattan, Maggie discovers that a spy amongst their ranks has alerted the Croat to their impending arrival. Having followed his mother, Hershel joins the mission. However, the New Babylon leadership refuses to listen to Maggie who is locked up for insubordination along with Hershel. As they cross the Hudson River in a ferry, New Babylon encounters a minefield and are attacked by the Burazi with walker bombs. Ginny frees Maggie and Hershel who flee in a raft with Perlie and a few others as the ferry is destroyed, killing most of the New Babylon forces, including Governor Byrd and General Houseman. Spotting Hershel, Negan allows the survivors to escape for which the Dama murders his friend Victor while also capturing New Babylon historian Benjamin Pierce. On shore, Maggie realizes that Hershel was the one who had betrayed them to the Croat while Ginny secretly steals Major Lucia Narvaez's gun. Hunted by the Burazi, the New Babylon survivors head into Central Park.
| 9 | 3 | "Why Did the Mainlanders Cross the River?" | Edward Ornelas | Brenna Kouf | May 18, 2025 | 0.255 |
In flashbacks, Hershel is visited by the Dama during his imprisonment who provides the boy with lavish amenities and entices him into her vision of the world. In the present, the surviving New Babylonians fall victim to a herd in Central Park, resulting in several deaths and Hershel getting separated from the others. The group meets the Foragers, a tribe of survivors led by Roksana who are living in the Loeb Boathouse. Lucia argues with Perlie about her desire to incorporate the Foragers into their forces, forcing Perlie to have to assert his authority over her. Hershel and a Forager named Joan are attacked by Waylen, a Burazi who mortally wounds Joan before Negan kills him to protect Hershel. Hershel explains to his mother his different view of Manhattan and what the city can be while Negan lies to the Croat about what happened and tries to undermine the Dama's hold over him. In turn, the Croat reveals that when he crashed on the island after fleeing the Sanctuary, the Dama gave him purpose again.
| 10 | 4 | "Feisty Friendly" | Edward Ornelas | Keith Staskiewicz | May 25, 2025 | 0.346 |
Maggie, Perlie and Hershel scout out the Burazi in search of the methane and the two adults bond over the struggles of parenting. Discovering her stolen gun in Ginny's possession, Narvaez opens up to the girl about how, after losing her family, Governor Byrd gave Narvaez a new purpose. Narvaez allows Ginny to keep the gun, learning that the girl intends to get revenge on her father's killer, Negan, who was supposedly killed by Perlie. The Burazi, accompanied by Pierce, visit the Metropolitan Museum of Art to negotiate with Bruegel to join their alliance. Pierce recognizes the Dama as a famous theater critic while Negan encounters Maggie who gets him to reveal that the methane is at St. Patrick's Cathedral. Negan warns Maggie about Hershel's betrayal while Hershel encounters the Dama; neither one reveals the meeting to their respective groups. Negan challenges Bruegel to a walker gladiator fight and discovers that Bruegel's Frankenstein champion is actually the gang leader's former bodyguard Tony who is pretending to be a walker. This forces Bruegel to join the alliance, but he kills Tony and begins plotting how to take control of the methane for himself.
| 11 | 5 | "The Bird Always Knows" | Edward Ornelas | Sarah Nolen | June 1, 2025 | 0.339 |
After discovering that Negan is still alive from Ginny, Narvaez mutinies, imprisons Perlie and Roksana and sends Maggie to lure Negan into a trap. When Maggie tries to kill Narvaez, Ginny betrays her and forces Maggie to surrender. Narvaez holds an execution, hanging Roksana for refusing to join New Babylon's cause and nearly killing Maggie, but the commotion draws a massive herd who devour all of the Foragers and surviving New Babylonians. Maggie is rescued by Ginny while Narvaez falls victim to a zombified Roksana. A remorseful Hershel confesses to his betrayal while Ginny hides a large wound on her back. Bruegel and his gang dispatch the walkers, seeking Maggie and Perlie's help. Negan attempts to recruit Christos into the alliance, discovering that he is only trying to protect other survivors rather than being a power-hungry warlord. After an act of sabotage seemingly committed by Christos' gang, the Burazi massacre all of the men to Negan and the Dama's fury. Negan sows division between the Croat and the Dama culminating in Negan killing the Dama's pet rat. Negan's successful efforts result in a violent argument and the Croat abandoning the Dama to die in a fire accidentally started during the altercation.
| 12 | 6 | "Bridge Partners Are Hard to Come by These Days" | Lauren Cohan | Eli Jorné | June 8, 2025 | 0.291 |
After realizing that Negan had set him up, the Croat attacks him, but Negan defeats his former friend and exiles him, taking control of the Burazi. Bruegel proposes an alliance between himself and New Babylon to take control of the methane from the Burazi; Perlie considers the offer despite Maggie's misgivings. Bruegel later reveals to Perlie that he had found a still barely alive Narvaez who had filled him in on the details before she died. Having been brainwashed by the Dama, Hershel attempts to poison the gang's water supply and argues with Maggie over her interest in keeping Negan alive. The two are attacked by a grizzly bear that had been living in Central Park and manage to kill it, but Hershel vanishes afterwards. Searching for her son, Maggie reunites with Negan who points her to the King Francis Theater. Negan's family finally arrives in Manhattan, but he decides to send them away for their own safety. Ginny attempts to kill Negan, but collapses from her wound which has become infected.
| 13 | 7 | "Novi Dan, Novi Početak" (Note: Croatian for "New Day, New Beginning") | Michael E. Satrazemis | Eli Jorné | June 15, 2025 | 0.350 |
Negan tends to Ginny with the help of Benjamin Pierce. Learning of rumors of hidden antibiotics at the overrun Bellevue Hospital, Negan searches without success. In the process, Negan hits his head and hallucinates Lucille, Annie and Joshua, expressing his regrets at failing his family. Negan hooks Ginny up to a ventilator in the hopes of enabling her recovery and declares that he will show no mercy to his enemies, having learned from his previous mistakes. At the theater, Maggie finds the Croat who helps her to search for Hershel. After a harrowing journey and a near-death experience, the Croat opens up to Maggie about his own painful past and the two make peace with each other. Maggie eventually finds her son at the New York Times Building where he betrays her to the Dama who is revealed to be still alive, and she captures Maggie.
| 14 | 8 | "If History Were a Conflagration" | Michael E. Satrazemis | Eli Jorné | June 22, 2025 | 0.376 |
The Dama and Hershel convince Maggie to kill Negan in order to finally move on; the Dama reveals that she had faked her death in the fire using a walker corpse. Joined by a reluctant Perlie, Bruegel's gang attempts to ambush the Burazi, only to fall into a cleverly laid trap by Negan. Everyone aside from Bruegel and Perlie are killed by the Burazi and a herd unleashed by Negan. Negan captures the pair and brutally executes Bruegel after playing a game of eeny, meeny, miny, moe similar to the one that Negan played before killing Abraham and Glenn. (Note: As depicted in The Walking Dead episode "Last Day on Earth" (2016).) Maggie stabs Negan to save Perlie, but is stopped from finishing the job with Lucille by the discovery that Ginny has died of her infection and reanimated. A devastated Negan puts the girl down while Maggie finally accepts that she needs to let go of her revenge and move forward. In the aftermath, Hershel remains with the Dama to continue her plans while a second wave of New Babylon forces arrives and is led to the methane by Benjamin Pierce. Maggie, Negan and Perlie vow to build a better future, recognizing that the only way forward is together.

=== Season 3 (2026) ===
| No. overall | No. in season | Title | Directed by | Written by | Original release date | U.S. viewers (millions) |
|---|---|---|---|---|---|---|
| 15 | 1 | "Trillium" | Sharat Raju | Matthew Negrete | July 26, 2026 | 0.297 |
While arguing over their past at Ginny's grave, Maggie and Negan are taken captive by siblings Renata and Luis, who lost their uncle and brother to the Croat. With their sister-in-law going into premature labor, the pair need the methane to power an incubator. However, the Croat blows up the methane tanks rather than let New Babylon have it, killing most of the soldiers. Mortally wounded in the explosion, the Croat offers to lead the group to where he hid the last tank and the plans to make more. Maggie reconciles with a remorseful Hershel, who realized that the Dama was using him when she tried to get him to kill his own mother. Meanwhile, Negan meets and bonds with Mason Dillard, a bartender who has developed his own system of survival. Maggie convinces Negan to help them get the tank at the Croatian consulate, where the Croat dies in Negan's arms. The baby is saved and Hershel displays an interest in studying medicine with Luis. Maggie and Negan amicably part ways as Negan returns to Dillard's bar, having finally reached a degree of peace with each other. Maggie contemplates staying in Manhattan to build a new community with Renata. The Dama finds two surviving New Babylon soldiers and plans to rally the New Babylon Army's remnants for her plans after seeing a wanted poster for Maggie and Negan.
| 16 | 2 | "Haven" | Sharat Raju | Seth Hoffman | August 2, 2026 | N/A |
Maggie relocates her people to Manhattan, where they and Renata's people spend weeks scavenging from the gangs and the New Babylon Army to build a thriving new community. Negan isolates himself at Dillard's bar, drinking and playing Gears of War 2. After overhearing two New Babylon soldiers talking about the Dama, Maggie, Negan, and Perlie follow them to the Majestic Theater where they are ambushed by the Dama and the remnants of the New Babylon Army. The three kill all but one of the soldiers, who later peacefully surrenders, and capture the Dama, leading to a great deal of debate about what to do with her. Hershel is receiving medical training from Luis and asks Maggie to help him prepare for the day when Hershel will have to kill someone living. Perlie returns to New Babylon to be with his family, believing that with the army destroyed, he and other like-minded people can change things for the better. Amidst Negan's frustration with his antics, Dillard opens up about being shaped by his past as an undercover police officer. Negan convinces Maggie that she needs to greatly expand the community to truly make it safe, and Maggie and Renata restore power to the Statue of Liberty to serve as a beacon which is noticed by an armed group on the mainland. While Maggie is away, Negan confronts and kills the Dama in her cage, leaving her as a walker.
| 17 | 3 | "Emigrants" | Daisy von Scherler Mayer | Mira Z. Barnum | August 9, 2026 | N/A |
In response to Maggie and Renata's beacon, warring groups arrive from Belleville and Newark. With most of the new arrivals being seriously injured, Maggie, Renata, Hershel, and Luis set to work to try to save as many people as possible while Negan and Dillard interrogate Bauer and Claudia, the leaders of the groups, to try to determine which is the better option for keeping around. A number of people die and some turn, causing chaos. Negan and Dillard restore power after it goes out while Maggie, Hershel, and Luis manage to eliminate the walkers and save most of their patients. However, the community is left low on medicine and methane. The two factions are taken to Central Park and are offered the chance to build a future together by clearing it for farmland. All but Bauer and Claudia make peace with the two leaders killing each other, consumed by their need for revenge. Maggie gives Hershel his grandfather's pocket watch and celebrates the day's success with Renata. Negan opens the bar to the other survivors and attempts to pull Dillard away from his walker "friends". However, Dillard hears one telling him not to trust Negan as he is taking Dillard away from them.
| 18 | 4 | "Found/Lost" | Daisy von Scherler Mayer | Matthew Negrete & Jacey Heldrich | August 16, 2026 | N/A |
After running low on medical supplies, Luis accompanies Maggie on a trip to Beacon, New York to meet with the mysterious Trader for more supplies. Meanwhile, Negan, Dillard, Hershel, Renata, and Fabian, a former Bricks resident, all work to gather and clear walkers from the street outside the community pantry. At the Trader's cabin, Maggie and Luis offer her the blueprints for the methane-power converter, and the Trader leaves for the night to meet her contact who can confirm the blueprints' validity. Gerald, the leader of a local Presbyterian community, arrives to visit the Trader but instead finds Maggie and Luis, and decides to invite them to his settlement's regular full-moon party. Maggie and Luis attend the party and dance with the townspeople. However, after imagining kissing Luis, Maggie suggests they leave and head back to the Trader's cabin. The next day, the Trader gives them the requested supplies, and they drive home. Renata subtly threatens Negan when the others suddenly arrive back. They walk back to the pantry until a sinkhole, caused by the walkers they have gathered, engulfs the pantry.
| 19 | 5 | "Imperialis" | Sylvain White | Justin Boyd | August 23, 2026 | N/A |
With supplies running low after the sinkhole destroyed the pantry, Maggie organizes a dangerous walker-wrangling mission in the Empire State Building accompanied by Negan, Dillard, Renata, and an elite team that they put together known as the Dead Squad. Despite Solmari, an engineer and Renata's cousin, nearly falling to her death, the mission is a success with enough walkers captured to power the community. Solmari designs a trap in the New York City Subway to lure in and capture more walkers, potentially solving the problem going forward. Everyone celebrates at Dillard's bar, where Dillard finds his strangeness is embraced by his new friends. Maggie and Negan get drunk together, with Negan concluding they could have been friends in another life if they had met under better circumstances, making Maggie slightly uncomfortable given their history. After seeing how upset Luis is at the realization that his wife is likely dead, Hershel paints a mural of her as a memorial. Fabian grows increasingly discontent with Maggie and Renata's leadership. After he is caught stealing and publicly humiliated by Renata, Fabian plots to kill the two women. Against Renata's orders, Negan executes Fabian and refuses to allow Renata to imprison him for it. Renata promises to return with more people and guns. Negan challenges her to try.
| 20 | 6 | "Genesis" | Lauren Wolkstein | Jacey Heldrich | August 30, 2026 | N/A |
In the aftermath of Fabian's murder, Negan contemplates his actions and the idea that he and Maggie could have been friends in another life. In a world where the zombie apocalypse never happened, Maggie visits Manhattan at Christmas and reunites with her sister Beth who is living her dream of being a singer. The sisters have recently lost their entire family and Maggie, who is going through a divorce, has devoted herself to making the family farm work instead of pursuing her own dreams. Maggie and Negan have a chance encounter in a coffee shop and form an instant connection with each other. As they spend the day together, Negan reveals that he became a business consultant after Lucille died and spent two years in prison for attacking Alan, a man who had been abusing one of his former students. Negan encourages Maggie to pursue what she wants while Maggie encourages Negan to reconnect with his son instead of letting revenge take hold. A fortune teller reveals to the pair that they are bound together in many lifetimes and suggests that they can unlock the best versions of each other. Maggie decides to sell the farm while Negan reconnects with Joshua. However, after they separate, Maggie changes her mind after learning that her plan for the farm has a chance to work while Negan gives in to his darker nature and kills Alan. Back in the real world, Hershel tells Maggie that Negan killed Fabian and sliced Dillard's face in half.
| 21 | 7 | "Hourglass" | Sylvain White | Seth Hoffman | September 6, 2026 | N/A |
Dillard refuses to leave Negan and finds Cockenspiel dead. Fed up with Dillard, Negan shoots Titicaca as well. Already severely unstable, Dillard goes completely insane, mutilating his own face to frame Negan and help convince Renata to kill him. Renata reveals to Maggie that Negan killed the Dama and gives Maggie until noon to get Negan to surrender peacefully or she will send in Dillard and the Dead Squad to take him down by any means necessary. Negan confesses the truth to Maggie about the Dama's death and reveals Fabian's plans as well as what really happened to Dillard, which Maggie had already suspected. Maggie tries without success to convince Negan to surrender while Luis implores Renata, who is haunted by the memories of losing her uncle and brother to the Croat, not to choose the path of violence. Renata ultimately relents, but a furious Dillard kills her and rallies the Dead Squad to lay siege to the bar. With the help of Hershel, Maggie and Negan escape and go into hiding. The Dead Squad raid the armory and take the entire community hostage, with Dillard threatening to start killing people if Negan does not surrender himself.
| 22 | 8 | "Tenebrae" | Michael Slovis | Mira Z. Barnum & Justin Boyd | September 13, 2026 | N/A |
In a flashback, a lonely Dillard imagines his walker pets as real people. In the present, Dillard decides to turn a zombified Renata into Titicaca's replacement and threatens to execute Luis. Negan considers surrendering, but Maggie, in the alley where they met the fortune teller in the alternate reality, admits that although she will never forgive Negan for what he did, she has finally moved past Negan killing Glenn and considers him family. While Negan sneaks past the guards at the community's wall, Maggie releases the walkers from the pens in the subway and Hershel sets off a siren in the apartment building to lure them in while rallying the residents to barricade the doors. Maggie, Negan and the walkers kill most of the Dead Squad while Hershel is forced to kill Radomir in defense of a group of innocent people. In a final confrontation, Negan attempts to bring his former best friend back to reality, but Dillard is too far gone, forcing Maggie to kill him to save Negan. Honoring Dillard's wishes, the pair allow him to reanimate, finding new friends amongst the dead. A week later, life has returned to normal for the community. Hershel completes his first year of medical training, tattoos himself with an image of the community, and paints a mural of Renata. Maggie puts away her wedding ring, finally ready to move on from Glenn, and takes leadership of the community. Negan finally joins and accepts Maggie's invitation to be head of security. With Manhattan having been reclaimed by the living, Maggie suggests that they start retaking the rest of New York City.

== Production ==
=== Development ===
In March 2022, AMC reported that they were developing a fourth spin-off of The Walking Dead titled Isle of the Dead revolving around Maggie and Negan with Lauren Cohan and Jeffrey Dean Morgan reprising their respective roles from the original series and Eli Jorné, a writer and co-executive producer on The Walking Dead, attached as showrunner alongside Cohan and Morgan as executive producers. In late August, the series title was renamed to The Walking Dead: Dead City. In July 2023, the series was renewed for a second season. In July 2025, the series was renewed for a third season, with Seth Hoffman taking over as showrunner. Hoffman was a writer and co-executive producer on The Walking Dead during its fourth, fifth, and sixth seasons.

=== Casting ===
In April 2022, Gaius Charles was cast as Perlie Armstrong. In July, Željko Ivanek, Jonathan Higginbotham, and Mahina Napoleon were cast as "The Croat", Tommaso, and Ginny respectively.

In April 2024, Kim Coates was announced to have joined the cast for the second season. In July, Keir Gilchrist, Dascha Polanco, Jake Weary, and Pooya Mohseni joined the cast. In February 2025, the main cast for the second season was confirmed.

In September 2025, Aimee Garcia and Jimmi Simpson were announced to have joined the cast as series regulars for the third season. In October, Raúl Castillo joined the cast as a series regular. In May 2026, the main cast for the third season was confirmed and Michael Emery also joined the cast. In July 2026, Emily Kinney was confirmed to reprise her role as Beth Greene from The Walking Dead in an episode set in an alternate reality.

=== Filming ===
Principal photography for the first season began on July 19 in New Jersey and wrapped on October 24, 2022. Locations include the Meadowlands Arena, Franklin Lakes Nature Preserve, Port Newark, National Newark Building, Newark Symphony Hall, Hoboken Terminal, Liberty State Park and Shades of Death Road.

Filming for the second season began by April 8, 2024, in Taunton, Massachusetts. Michael E. Satrazemis, who previously directed episodes of The Walking Dead, Fear the Walking Dead and The Walking Dead: The Ones Who Live would be directing, with Adam Suschitzky serving as cinematographer. Filming had wrapped by July 15, 2024. Co-star and executive producer Lauren Cohan directed episode 6, although she was erroneously said to also direct episode 4.

Filming for the third season began by September 8, 2025, in Brockton, Massachusetts. Additional filming occurred in Boston and Worcester, Massachusetts.

=== Marketing ===
In November 2022, an early look on the behind the scenes of the series was released by AMC.

== Release ==
The Walking Dead: Dead City premiered on AMC on June 18, 2023. The series premiered early on AMC+ on June 15, with subsequent episodes available three days before their broadcast premieres. The first season was released on Blu-ray and DVD on September 12, 2023.

The second season premiered on May 4, 2025. The second season was released on Blu-ray and DVD on October 7, 2025.

The third season premiered on July 26, 2026. The third season was released on Blu-ray and DVD on November 17, 2026.

== Reception ==
For the first season, the review aggregator website Rotten Tomatoes reported an 80% approval rating based on 58 critic reviews with an average rating of 7.2/10. The website's critics consensus reads, "While Dead City still creaks under the constraints of being an umpteenth spinoff, it ultimately shakes off the franchise's rigor mortis thanks to a change of scenery and a focus on two fan favorites." Metacritic, which uses a weighted average, assigned a score of 58 out of 100 based on 10 critics, indicating "mixed or average reviews".

For the second season, Rotten Tomatoes reported a 56% approval rating based on 9 critic reviews with an average rating of 6.5/10. For the third season, Rotten Tomatoes reported a 100% approval rating based on 9 critic reviews with an average rating of 7.5/10.
