= Erēmīta (Anthologies) =

2021 documentary anthology

- Directed by: Sam Abbas; Alexis Zabe; Ashley Connor; Soledad Rodríguez; Stefano Falivene; Antoine Héberlé
- Produced by: Sam Abbas; Frédéric Bellaïche
- Cinematography: Alexis Zabe; Ashley Connor; Soledad Rodríguez; Stefano Falivene; Antoine Héberlé; Sam Abbas
- Edited by: Sam Abbas; Alexis Zabe; Ashley Connor; Soledad Rodríguez; Stefano Falivene; Antoine Héberlé
- Release date: February 26, 2021
- Countries: United States; France; Argentina; Italy
- Languages: English; French; Spanish; Italian; Portuguese

Erēmīta (Anthologies) is an arthouse documentary anthology featuring short films composed during the 2020 COVID-19 pandemic. The anthology curated by Sam Abbas interweaves the literature of Friedrich Nietzsche.

== Background ==
In July 2020, it was announced via Variety a group of film-makers would create an anthology of short documentary films. The anthology shot during the COVID-19 pandemic lockdown features contributions from Alexis Zabé, Ashley Connor, Soledad Rodríguez, Stefano Falivene, Antoine Héberlé, and Abbas.

“There is no theme. Film whatever you want, however you want, with whomever you want.” This is the message that Egyptian filmmaker Sam Abbas sent to his favorite cinematographers as an invitation to contribute to his new film. The film is one of the first projects of Maxxie, Suzzee, & Cinema a production company in France.

== Directors ==
- Alexis Zabé
- Ashley Connor
- Antoine Héberlé
- Sam Abbas
- Soledad Rodríguez
- Stefano Falivene

== Release ==
The film received a limited release across the United States and internationally February 26, 2021 in physical and virtual cinemas. The filmmakers also announced that 100% of the filmmakers’ share of revenue from rentals will be donated to Amnesty International.

== Reception ==
On the review aggregator website Rotten Tomatoes, 71% of 7 critics' reviews are positive. The Guardian gave the film a negative review, writing that the film "would possibly work better on the walls of a gallery." Metacritic, which uses a weighted average, assigned the film a score of 60 out of 100, based on 6 critics, indicating "mixed or average" reviews.
