= Home Movie: The Princess Bride =

American fantasy comedy miniseries

- Genre: Fantasy adventure comedy
- Directed by: Jason Reitman
- Starring: Various actors
- Original language: English
- No. of episodes: 10

Production
- Executive producers: Jeffrey Katzenberg; Van Toffler; Barry Barclay; Floris Bauer
- Producers: Jason Blumenfeld; Erica Mills
- Editor: Nathan Orloff
- Production companies: World Central Kitchen; Right of Way Films; Gunpowder & Sky

Original release
- Network: Quibi
- Release: June 29 – July 8, 2020

Home Movie: The Princess Bride is an American comedy television miniseries directed by Jason Reitman, a "fan-made" recreation of the 1987 film The Princess Bride. Produced while the participating actors were isolating themselves during the COVID-19 pandemic in the United States, it is filmed in a deliberately DIY fashion, with an ensemble cast recording their scenes on their own smartphones, and multiple actors playing the most prominent roles. It features the final screen performance of Carl Reiner, the father of the original film's director Rob Reiner. It premiered in short installments on Quibi in June and July 2020.

== Plot ==
The Home Movie version of the film follows the same fundamental plot. In contemporary times, a grandfather reads the story of The Princess Bride to his dismissive sick grandson. In the story, set in medieval times in the fictional country of Florin, Buttercup and her farmhand Westley fall in love. Westley goes off to seek his fortune to marry Buttercup but she soon learns of his death at the hands of the Dread Pirate Roberts, and comes to accept the marriage proposal of Prince Humperdinck. Near her wedding day, three scoundrels, Vizzini, Inigo Montoya, and Fezzik, abduct Buttercup at the request of Humperdinck to make it appear as an act from a neighboring kingdom and pretense to start a war. They are chased by the Man in Black, later revealed to be the Dread Pirate Roberts. Roberts beats and spares Inigo and Fezzik, and survives a poison challenge from Vizzini to free Buttercup. He reveals that he is actually Westley, that the "Dread Pirate Roberts" is a title passed along from one holder to the next, and that he had come after hearing that Buttercup's life is in danger. The two are soon caught by Humperdinck and Count Tyrone Rugen.

Humperdinck returns Buttercup to the castle to prepare for the wedding, claiming that Westley returned to the sea, when in reality, Rugen has taken Westley to be tortured in a secret chamber. When Buttercup refused to show any love for Humperdinck, Humperdinck uses Rugen's torture device to apparently kill Westley. Inigo and Fezzik, having reunited near the castle, hear Westley's final screams, discover his body, and take him to Miracle Max. Max finds Westley clings to life due to his true love for Buttercup and helps resuscitate him. Westley, still half-prone from being nearly dead, devises a plan with Inigo and Fezzik to interrupt the wedding to rescue Buttercup. Inigo, learning that Rugen is his father's killer, gets revenge by killing Rugen after a long fight. Fezzik helps Westley to Buttercup's room. Westley wounds Humperdinck to shame him before he, Buttercup, and Fezzik flee with Inigo. The grandson, who had told the grandfather to skip all the kissing parts in the book before, allows him to read the final kissing scene in the book.

== Cast ==
Character	Chapter									
Character	1	2	3	4	5	6	7	8	9	10
The Grandson	Fred Savage; Josh Gad	Mckenna Grace			Keith L. Williams		Logan Kim	Joey King		Rob Reiner
The Grandfather	Adam Sandler; Rob Reiner	Rob Reiner; J. K. Simmons			Giancarlo Esposito		Sarah Silverman	Roman Mars; Robert Wuhl		Carl Reiner
The Mother	Retta									
Westley	Chris Pine; Common		Jack Black	Kaitlyn Dever; David Spade; Jon Hamm	Sam Rockwell; Neil Patrick Harris	Brandon Routh; Courtney Ford; Sophie Turner; Lucas Hedges	Christopher Mintz-Plasse	Tommy Dewey	Taika Waititi	Paul Rudd; Cary Elwes (Note: In reused footage from the 1987 film)
Buttercup	Annabelle Wallis; Tiffany Haddish; Zazie Beetz	Zazie Beetz; Mackenzie Davis		Alice Oswalt; Jon Hamm's dog	Leslie Bibb; David Burtka	Courtney Ford; Brandon Routh; Joe Jonas; Jenna Ortega	Jennifer Garner; Zoe Saldaña	Beanie Feldstein	Penélope Cruz; Kimberly Brook	Zoey Deutch; Robin Wright
Inigo Montoya		Pedro Pascal; Nick Kroll	Oscar Nunez; Diego Luna	Finn Wolfhard				Sarah Cooper; Keegan-Michael Key	John Cho; Catherine Reitman	Javier Bardem; Natalie Morales
Fezzik		Jason Segel; Nick Kroll	Brian Baumgartner	Dave Bautista				Shaquille O'Neal; Craig Robinson	Catherine Reitman; Charlize Theron	Zoey Deutch
Vizzini		Rainn Wilson; Nick Kroll	Angela Kinsey	King Bach; Patton Oswalt						
Prince Humperdinck	Hugh Jackman			Thomas Lennon	Thomas Lennon	David Oyelowo	José Andrés; Don Johnson; Elijah Wood	Dennis Haysbert; Ernie Hudson	Penélope Cruz; James Van Der Beek	Cary Elwes
Count Rugen				Oliver Lennon	Oliver Lennon	B. J. Novak	Andy Serkis; Stephen Merchant	Stephen Merchant	Meredith Salenger	Bryan Cranston
Rodent of Unusual Size						Leo James Routh; Sophie Turner's dog				
The Albino							Nicholas Braun			
The Ancient Booer							Jennifer Garner			
Yellin the Messenger								Richard Speight Jr.		
Miracle Max									Seth Rogen	
Valerie									Ari Graynor	
The Impressive Clergyman									John Malkovich	

== Production ==
Reitman came up with the idea in March 2020, early in the COVID-19 pandemic quarantine, of remaking the 1987 film The Princess Bride with actors performing in their own homes. He saw it as a way to raise money for World Central Kitchen to support restaurants that were also struggling under the pandemic, allowing them to operate and provide meals to poor families. Reitman talked to Jeffrey Katzenberg about it, who made a million-dollar donation to the charity, and arranged to stream the final product on the upcoming Quibi streaming service. Reitman created a proof of concept scene with himself and his daughter recreating the initial scene with the grandfather and the boy that leads off the film, and used that to gain approval from Norman Lear, who owned the rights to the film, and the estate of William Goldman, which controlled the rights to the original story. Reitman was also able to get the rights to the film's score from Mark Knopfler.

The series was filmed by the actors at their homes during quarantine. Actors provided their own props and costumes, and swapped roles between scenes. Each actor filmed their own side of a scene in isolation, due to social distancing guidelines, with the exception of roommates such as Nicholas Braun and Christopher Mintz-Plasse as well as cohabitating couples Chris Pine and Annabelle Wallis, Common and Tiffany Haddish, Sam Rockwell and Leslie Bibb, Neil Patrick Harris and David Burtka, Brandon Routh and Courtney Ford, and Sophie Turner and Joe Jonas, who filmed their scenes together. Special effects were created in a humorously homemade manner; sets were recreated in miniature form with LEGO and an R.O.U.S. ("rodent of unusual size") is represented by Sophie Turner's corgi. Reitman provided minimal direction to the actors outside of answering a few questions.

Fred Savage plays the grandson in the opening scene, making him the only actor from the original film to reprise his original role. Cary Elwes, who starred as Westley in the original film, appears in the final confrontation between Westley and Humperdinck, but instead plays Humperdinck (opposite Paul Rudd). Rob Reiner, director of the original film, appears in the production in two roles. He is one of the actors playing the grandfather in the opening bookend scene, reading the film's fairy-tale story to his grandson (played in this segment by Josh Gad). He also appears in the closing bookend scene as the grandson, with his father Carl Reiner now playing the loving grandfather and speaking the film's catchphrase "as you wish" (which means "I love you"). Carl Reiner died three days after recording his scene, and the work as a whole is dedicated to him.

Mark Knopfler's score is performed by Ethan Gruska, Blake Mills, Bad Suns, Mateo Messina, Phoebe Bridgers, Bahamas, Sylvan Esso, Alex Ebert, Beulahbelle, and Perfume Genius.

== Release ==
The series was announced on June 26, 2020. The film was released in short segments – the Quibi service's usual format – with the first installment appearing on June 29.

== Episodes ==
No.	Title	Directed by	Written by	Original release date
1	"Chapter One: As You Wish"	Jason Reitman	William Goldman	June 29, 2020
2	"Chapter Two: The Shrieking Eels"	Jason Reitman	William Goldman	June 30, 2020
3	"Chapter Three: The Cliffs of Insanity"	Jason Reitman	William Goldman	July 1, 2020
4	"Chapter Four: Battle of the Wits"	Jason Reitman	William Goldman	July 2, 2020
5	"Chapter Five: Life Is Pain"	Jason Reitman	William Goldman	July 3, 2020
6	"Chapter Six: The Fire Swamp"	Jason Reitman	William Goldman	July 4, 2020
7	"Chapter Seven: The Pit of Despair"	Jason Reitman	William Goldman	July 5, 2020
8	"Chapter Eight: Ultimate Suffering"	Jason Reitman	William Goldman	July 6, 2020
9	"Chapter Nine: Have Fun Storming the Castle!"	Jason Reitman	William Goldman	July 7, 2020
10	"Chapter Ten: To the Pain!"	Jason Reitman	William Goldman	July 8, 2020
