= See You Then (film) =

2021 American film by Mari Walker

- Theatrical release poster
- Directed by: Mari Walker
- Written by: Kristen Uno; Mari Walker
- Produced by: Matt Miller; Mia Schulman; Kristen Uno; Mari Walker
- Starring: Pooya Mohseni; Lynn Chen; Danny Jacobs; Nican Robinson; Nikohl Boosheri
- Cinematography: Jordan T. Parrott
- Edited by: Mari Walker
- Music by: Tom Wyman
- Production companies: Vanishing Angle; DiffeRant Productions
- Distributed by: Breaking Glass Pictures
- Release dates: March 16, 2021 (SXSW); April 1, 2022 (United States)
- Running time: 74 minutes
- Country: United States
- Language: English

See You Then is a 2021 American drama film directed, produced, and edited by Mari Walker (in her directorial debut) from a screenplay she co-wrote with Kristen Uno. It stars Pooya Mohseni, Lynn Chen, Danny Jacobs, Nican Robinson, and Nikohl Boosheri.

The film premiered at South by Southwest on March 16, 2021, and was released in the United States on April 1, 2022, by Breaking Glass Pictures. It received generally positive reviews from critics.

== Plot ==
Kris is a trans-woman from Phoenix, Arizona. A decade after abruptly breaking up with Naomi, the duo is reuniting for a single evening in Los Angeles. Kris is in town for a network security conference. She is taking care of her cousin's two children. Naomi, a professor, is a mother of two. Kris and Naomi talk about Kris's transition and their friendship. Naomi says she felt hurt when Kris broke up with her. Kris apologizes. Naomi, a performance artist, reveals she gave up on her dreams and moved back with her parents before meeting her husband, Jim. Kris encourages her to return to performing. Later, Kris reveals she broke up with the first person she ever dated since transitioning 13 years ago. The duo talks about Kris' gender reassignment surgery, dating, and spending time with your loved one. Kris tells Naomi that it is harder to be female than trans.

Naomi's colleague Peter Gleason flirts with the duo at a bar. He is on a date with a former student. Naomi calls her life a series of setbacks. Kris tells her that everybody's life is unique. Naomi introduces Kris to Martin, another of her colleagues, who flirts with her. Naomi drives home early to see her child. Naomi and Kris talk about having children. They go to the campus where Naomi works and visit her office. Naomi recalls their last night together. Kris apologizes again, they argue, and Naomi reveals Kris impregnated her before abandoning her, but did not keep it. Naomi tells Kris that she will never be a mother. Kris says Naomi has no one to blame for her sad life. The penultimate scene shows Naomi performing, lying down next to a painting of a pregnant belly before destroying the art, symbolically accepting who she is. Finally, Kris is seen some time later on a picnic apparently passing completely.

== Cast ==
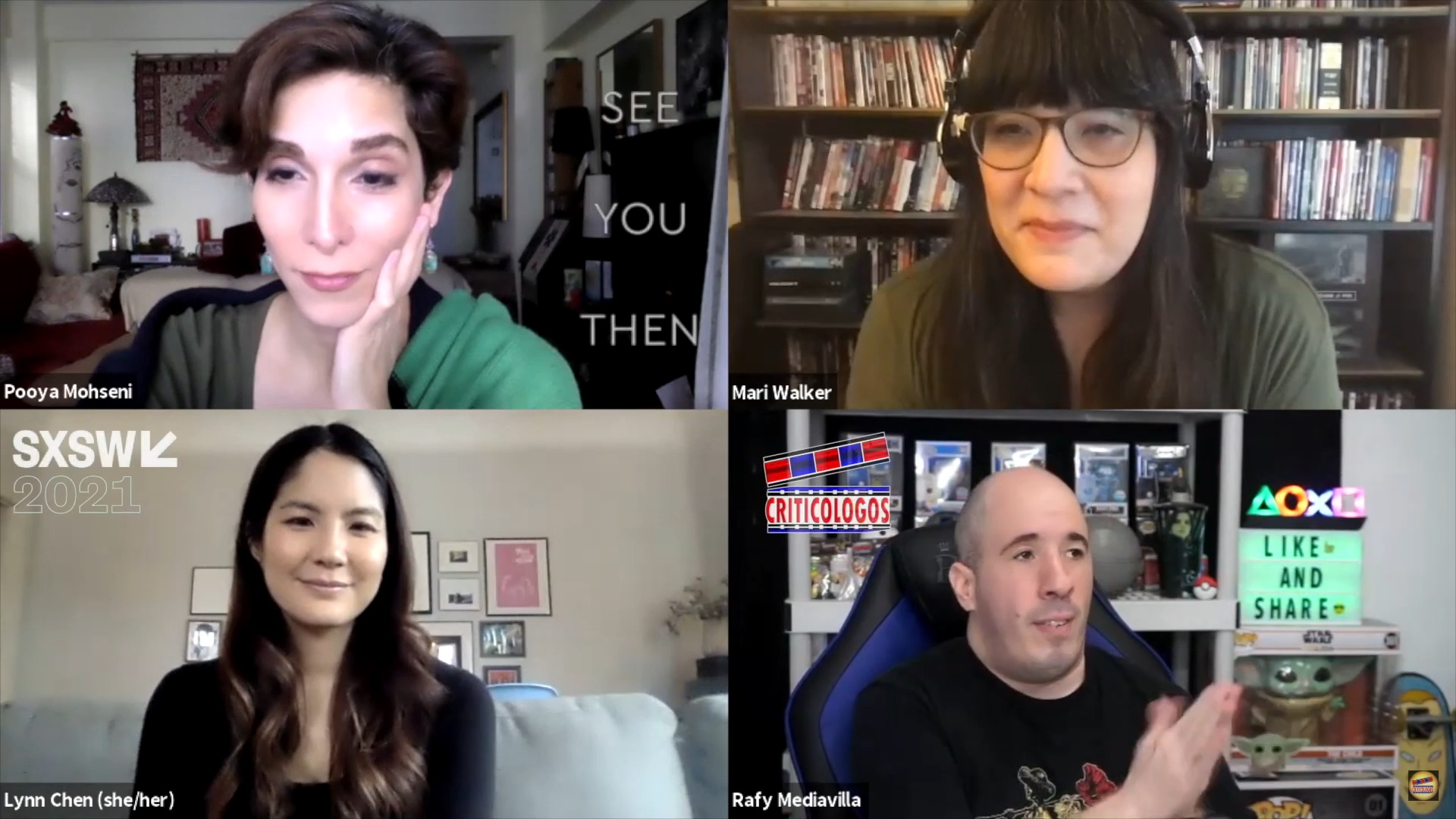
2021 interview with See You Then film talent (left to right, top to bottom): actress Pooya Mohseni, filmmaker Mari Walker, actress Lynn Chen, interviewer Rafy Mediavilla

- Pooya Mohseni as Kris Ahadi
- Lynn Chen as Naomi Liu
- Danny Jacobs as Peter Gleason
- Nican Robinson as Martin
- Nikohl Boosheri as Julie
- Mitch N Mendoza as Dylan

== Production ==
The concept for the film arose in the summer of 2017, after Mari Walker wrapped the festival run of Swim, her first narrative short film. She wrote the screenplay with her housemate Kristen Uno. Her hopes for the film were to "provide a new perspective into the trans experience and spark a larger discussion around questions of identity, womanhood, and belonging. The aim of this story was never to focus on transitioning or trans-ness, but rather on the underlying humanity of these two characters and their lives." Funding the project proved difficult. Vanishing Angle approached several production companies for help financing it, but all of them declined due to Walker's lack of experience as a first-time director. The film was funded through Wefunder, a crowdfunding service recommended by Jim Cummings, who had used it to fund his own film The Beta Test around the same time. See You Then was filmed chronologically with the expensive Sony Venice 6K digital camera. It was shot in thirteen days in Los Angeles; filming wrapped on February 1, 2020.

== Release ==
The film premiered at the South by Southwest film festival on March 16, 2021, in the Narrative Spotlight program. It was released in select theaters in the United States on April 1, 2022, by Breaking Glass Pictures, and on DVD and streaming on April 19.

== Reception ==
On the review aggregator website Rotten Tomatoes, 97% of 35 reviews are positive, with an average rating of 7.3/10. The website's critical consensus reads, "A character-driven treat for fans of conversation-based drama, the well-acted See You Then offers a refreshing perspective on relationship stories and gender roles." Metacritic, which uses a weighted average, assigned the film a score of 69 out of 100 based on six critics, indicating "generally favorable reviews".

Nick Allen of RogerEbert.com praised the film's confidence, especially in its screenplay. He said the film "honors the gradual evolution of a long talk, so much that their literal pacing reads as its only unnatural flourish—they take several minutes to walk about two blocks. But that rhythm, of one step at a time, nearly takes on a hypnotic effect. It forces the viewer to slow down and drink it all in, and focus on what Kris and Naomi are not saying to each other." Sarah-Tai Black, writing for the Los Angeles Times, said "the film's greatest achievement is the ease with which it traverses the delicate territory of its characters’ lives without losing the sense of a past both shared and fractured in memory." In a less positive review, The Guardian's Phuong Le wrote, "Despite its flaws, See You Then is an interesting opportunity to see trans talents in front of and behind the camera."

== Awards & Nominations ==
Award	Year	Category	Recipient	Result	Ref.
Eastern Oregon Film Festival	2021	Best Feature Narrative	Mari Walker	Nominated	
FilmOut San Diego, US	2021	FilmOut Festival Award Best Actress	Pooya Mohseni	Won	
L.A. Outfest	2021	Grand Jury Award Outstanding Performance in a U.S. Feature	Pooya Mohseni	Won	
Nashville Film Festival	2021	Grand Jury Prize Bridgestone Narrative Feature Competition	Mari Walker	Nominated	
