= Bound (2023 film) =

- Directed by: Isaac Hirotsu Woofter
- Written by: Isaac Hirotsu Woofter
- Produced by: Isaac Hirotsu Woofter; Tom & Akemi Woofter; Gil Elbaz; David Robert Fulkerson; Ramin Karimloo; Tom Kelly; Mark Allen Kincer; Ashwin Kulkarni; Lauren Legacki; Nelda Law; Alexandra Faye Sadeghian; Daniel & Robert Woofter; Ronald Woofter; Tim & Joni Woofter; Tom X
- Cinematography: Maximillan Lewin; Jake Simpson
- Edited by: Kristian Otero
- Music by: Ethan Startzman
- Production company: Paralysis Productions
- Release date: December 3, 2023 (Dances with Films)
- Running time: 99 minutes
- Country: United States
- Language: English

Bound (sometimes stylized "BOUND") is a 2023 American crime-drama/thriller and feature directorial debut from former Broadway actor turned screenwriter, Isaac Hirotsu Woofter. The indie film is about a homeless runaway who gets back on her feet with the help of some "found family" before returning home to confront her dark past..

Bound is loosely based on true events from lead Actor Alexandra Faye Sadeghian's childhood that left her battling trauma. The film cover topics like mental illness and family.

The story takes place in and around New York City, but most of the filming took place in New Jersey.

== Synopsis ==
When Bella discovers that her mentally ill uncle/stepfather, Gordy, hid her college acceptance letter, she kicks him out of the house, believing it to be for good. However, when her mother, Yeva, allows Gordy back, Bella and her pocket squirrel, Bandit, flee to New York City with no money, no friends and no plan to return.

In New York, Bella finds support from Marta, an undocumented immigrant; Owais, a lonely veteran; and Standrick, an insecure clothing designer. Bella begins to thrive until she uncovers an unlikely and horrifying connection. This revelation drives Bella to act impulsively without consulting her new "found family," resulting in devastating consequences.

Bella and her friends devise dangerous plan to break free from Gordy. The plan fluctuates between success and failure, ultimately finding resolution with the help of an unexpected person.

== Cast ==
The ensemble is made up mostly of diverse veteran stage actors, including 5 Broadway performers; Karimloo, Carroll, Tewari, Woofter, Mohseni (who makes her Broadway debut in 2025), and Bandit, a live flying squirrel (aka sugar glider).

- Ramin Karimloo as Owais
- Jessica Pimentel as Marta
- Bryant Carroll as Gordy
- Pooya Mohseni as Yeva
- Alexandra Faye Sadeghian as Bella
- Jaye Alexander as Standrick
- Josh Alscher as Donnie
- Alok Tewari as Shoaib
- Miguel Izaguirre as Cesar
- Ethan Herschenfeld as Tariq
- Bandit as Bandit

== Reviews ==
On review aggregator Rotten Tomatoes, Bound has an 91% approval rating, based on eleven reviews.

ReviewRon's Ronak Kotecha states that although "the last few scenes seem implausible...the complexity and depth of this film is definitely worth the price of admission."

Tony Asankomah of GH Movie Freak says "Bound is sure to leave viewers with a profound reflection on the human capacity for change and the strength found in shared struggles...however, it might not pack enough to win over all audiences."

Vague Visages's Q.V. Hough, says "...the feature directorial debut from actor Isaac Hirotsu Woofter, spotlights the struggles of fringe society characters but falls apart with its confusing editing and narrative structure."

Dan Lybarger of Film Threat wrote that "New York has been filmed a lot over the last century and a half, but if Bound is any indication, the city that never sleeps has more promising tales to come."

== Festival run and awards ==
Bound had its world premiere at the Regal Cinema in Union Square and will play festivals throughout 2024.

Festival	Premiere	Date	Awards Wins/Noms
Dances With Films: NY	World Premiere	Nov 30, Dec 2, 2023	Grand Jury (nom), Audience Award (nom)
Dances With Films: LA	West Coast Premiere	Jun 22, 2024	Grand Jury (nom), Audience Award (nom)
Northeast Film Festival	New Jersey Premiere	Sept 7, 2024	Best Film (win), Audience Choice (win), Best Actress (win), Best Director (nom), Best Supporting Actress (nom)
Breck Film Fest	Colorado Premiere	Sept 20, 2024	Best Ensemble (win), Best Screenplay (nom)
Newport Beach Film Festival	Newport Premiere	Oct 18, 2024	Grand Jury (nom), Audience Award (nom)
Shockfest Film Festival			Honorable Mention (win)
Bahamas International Film Festival	International Premiere	Nov 16, 2024	Best Actress (win), Best Feature (nom)
Meliora Film Fest		Nov 16, 2024	Grand Prize (win), Best Feature (win), Best Director (win), Best Ensemble (win), Best Screenplay (win), Best Actress (nom), Best Supporting Actor x2 (nom), Best Song (nom)
Big Apple Film Festival		Nov 20, 2024	Best Feature Film (nom)
SF Indie Fest	San Francisco Premiere	Feb 8, 2025	Best Film (nom), Audience Award (nom)
Santa Fe Film Festival	New Mexico Premiere	Feb 19, 2025	Best Dramatic Feature (nom), Best First Time Director (nom), Best Ensemble (nom), Best Actor X2 (nom), Best Screenplay (nom), Cinematography (nom), Best Sound (nom), Best Editor (nom)
Beaufort International Film Festival	South Carolina Premiere	Feb 21, 2025	Best Film (nom), Best Director (nom), Best Ensemble (nom), Best Actress (nom), Best Score/Soundtrack (nom), Audience Award (nom)
Phoenix Film Festival	Arizona Premiere	Mar 28, 30, Apr 3, 2025	Audience Award (nom)
