= The Wedding (2018 film) =

- Directed by: Sam Abbas
- Written by: Sam Abbas
- Produced by: Sam Abbas; Suki Sandhu; Randleson Floyd; Neal Kumar; Casey Hartnett; Kyleigh Johnson
- Starring: Nikohl Boosheri; Sam Abbas; Harry Aspinwall; Hend Ayoub; James Penfold
- Cinematography: Shane Ainsworth
- Edited by: Sam Abbas
- Production companies: ArabQ Films; Survivant Productions; INvolve; Alexandria Film Insititue
- Release date: November 6, 2018
- Country: United States
- Languages: English; Arabic

The Wedding is a 2018 film directed by Sam Abbas and starring Nikohl Boosheri, Sam Abbas, Harry Aspinwall, James Penfold, and Hend Ayoub.

== Production ==
In August 2017, it was announced Nikohl Boosheri, Sam Abbas, Harry Aspinwall, James Penfold and Send Ayoub joined the cast of the film, with Sam Abbas directing the film from a screenplay he wrote. Neal Kumar, Casey Hartnett, Abbas, and Kyleigh Johnson would produce. The Wedding was announced during the Berlin Film Festival as the first title of ArabQ Films.

== Cast ==
- Nikohl Boosheri as Sara
- Sam Abbas as Rami
- Harry Aspinwall as Lee
- James Penfold as Tom
- Hend Ayoub as Abir

== Release ==
The film's trailer was released exclusively via The Hollywood Reporter on August 25, 2018. HuffPost called the film "The Queer Movie That Could Make Waves In The Middle East". Raseef, an Egyptian newspaper, said the film would "cause fuss in theaters".

The film had a secret work-in-progress screening in Egypt in August 2018. Screenings in the Middle East started in November 2018, and were done in select theaters and by invitation.

== Reception ==
Variety gave the film a negative review, calling it "dull" and saying it lacked originality. Additionally, they questioned whether it could be categorized as Egyptian, since the film's story and characters were so removed from Egypt and Egyptian society. Similarly, The Hollywood Reporter criticized the movie's execution, calling it "more a muted relationship drama than a timely exploration of clashing sexual and religious values".
