= Francesca Cavallo =

Italian author (born 1983)

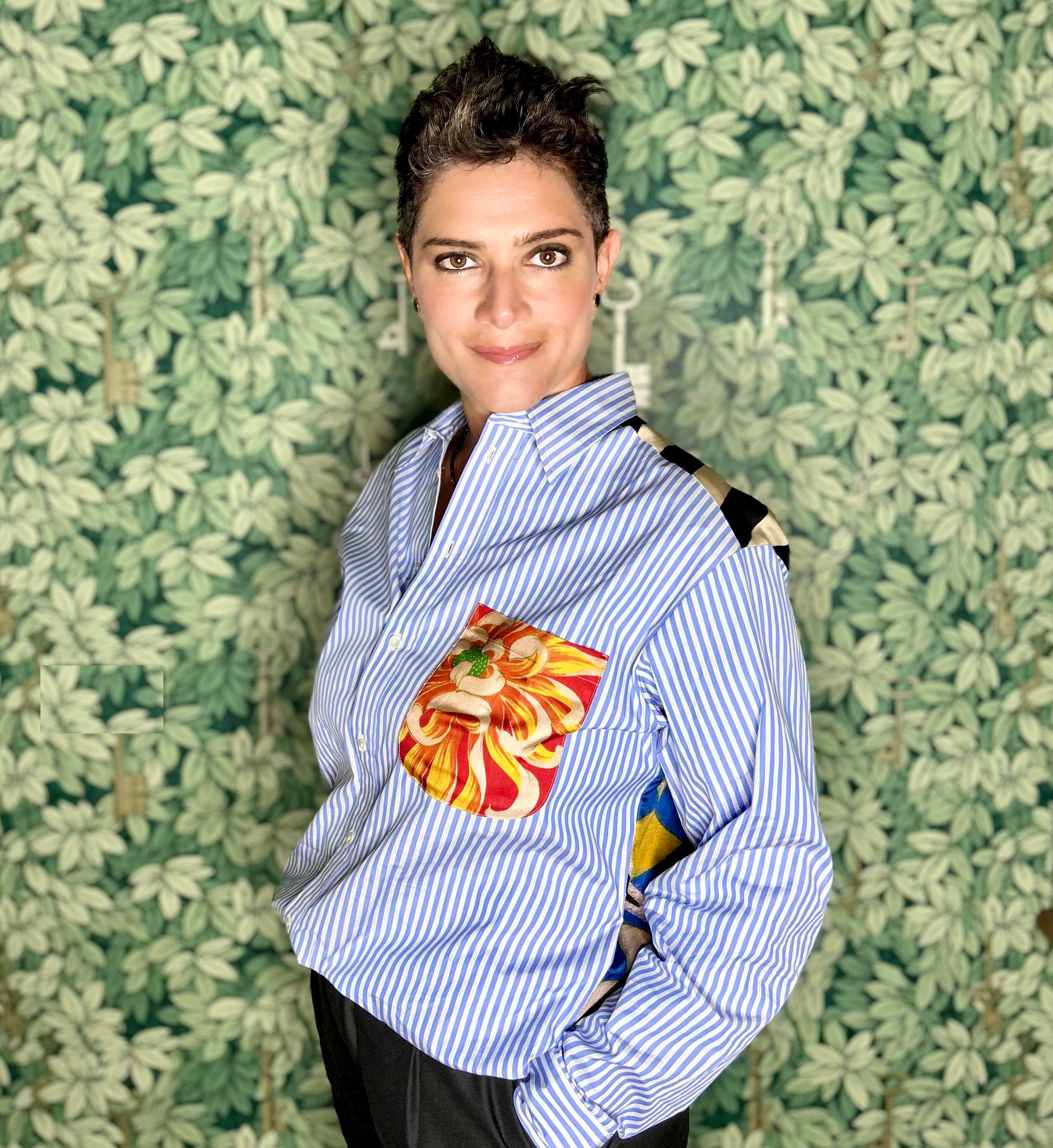
- Cavallo in 2024
- Born: September 23, 1983 (age 43); Lizzano, Apulia, Italy
- Education: BA in Liberal Studies in Communication (cum laude) University of Milan, MFA in Stage directing from Academy of Dramatic Art Paolo Grassi
- Occupations: Writer, entrepreneur, activist
- Notable work: Good Night Stories for Rebel Girls, Elfi al quinto piano
- Awards: PW Star Watch 2018
- Website: www.francescatherebel.com

Francesca Cavallo (born 23 September 1983) is an Italian author, public speaker, entrepreneur and podcast producer. She is the co-author of the Good Night Stories for Rebel Girls series.

== Early life, education and theater ==
Francesca Cavallo grew up in Lizzano, a small Southern Italian town in the Apulia Region. Her mother, Rosa Mandurino, is a housewife and a community organizer; her father, Domenico Cavallo, a FIAT car dealer.

When Cavallo turned 18, she moved to Milan. In 2005, she got her BA degree at Università Statale di Milano. She decided to continue her education, obtaining a diploma as a theatre director at the Academy of Dramatic Art Paolo Grassi in Milan.

Between 2005 and 2011, Cavallo founded and led the theatre collective Kilodrammi, where she wrote and directed several productions. Among these was Somari, which won the 2011 Premio Infogiovani at the International Theatre Festival in Lugano (Switzerland) and was also nominated for the 2010 Premio Scenario Infanzia, an Italian award in Theatre for Young Audiences.

In 2010, Cavallo founded Sferracavalli, a festival focused on bringing contemporary theatre companies from countries with significant immigrant representation in Puglia to Southern Italy.

== Publishing ==
In 2011, Cavallo and her then-partner, Elena Favilli, co-founded Timbuktu Magazine, which according to L'Italo-Americano was the first iPad magazine for children.

In 2012, Cavallo and Favilli moved to California and founded Timbuktu Labs, where Cavallo served as co-founder and Chief Creative Officer until 2019. Under Cavallo's creative direction, Timbuktu Labs created Timbuktu Magazine, several other educational apps for children, and the Good Night Stories for Rebel Girls book series and podcast, which raised over £409,000($600,000) on Kickstarter in 2016, has been translated into 49 languages, and has won several international awards.

In 2018, Cavallo won the Publishers Weekly StarWatch Award.

In 2019, Cavallo was selected for the European Young Leaders program by the think tank Friends of Europe. The same year, Cavallo parted ways with Timbuktu Labs (now called Rebel Girls) and founded an independent media project aimed at increasing diversity in children's media called Undercats. Undercats' first project was a Christmas novel starring a lesbian, biracial family: Elves on the Fifth Floor, published in Italian by Feltrinelli, in German by Mentor Verlag, in Spanish, Catalan and Swedish by Bonnier.

In 2020, during the COVID-19 pandemic, Cavallo published and released for free the children's story Doctor Li and the Crown-Wearing Virus, an illustrated book about Doctor Li Wenliang. The book was praised by the Los Angeles Review of Books and by Book Riot for its role in combating anti-Asian racism. Doctor Li and the Crown-Wearing Virus has been translated by volunteers into 38 languages.

In 2021, Cavallo moved back to Italy and launched the Paralympians book series on Kickstarter, a series of four picture books about the lives of Paralympic champions Tatyana McFadden, Jean-Baptiste Alaize, Beatrice Vio, and Zahra Nemati. The series has been published in English, Italian, and Spanish.

== Public speaking ==
Cavallo is a public speaker and an advocate for women's and minorities' rights. She has spoken at the Massachusetts Conference for Women in Boston, at the Women in Tech Conference in Warsaw, the Feminno Conference in Yerevan, the Novatore Summit in Riga, the State of Europe Conference in Brussels.

== Works ==
- Good Night Stories for Rebel Girls Volumes 1 & 2
- I am a Rebel Girl: a Journal to Start Revolutions
- Elves on the Fifth Floor
- Doctor Li and the Crown-Wearing Virus
- Fastest Woman on Earth
- The Long Jump
- Ho un fuoco nel cassetto

== Awards and acknowledgements ==
- 2010 - Nomination for Best Play, Premio Scenario Infanzia - Somari
- 2011 - Lugano International Theater Festival, Premio Infogiovani Winner - Somari
- 2011 - Principi Attivi, Winner, Sferracavalli
- 2012 - Best Italian Startup, Timbuktu Labs
- 2012 - Best Design Award, Launch Conference Education & Kids, Timbuktu Magazine
- 2014 - Biennale of Architecture Bordeaux, Special Mention, Timbuktu COLORS
- 2017 - New York Times Bestseller - Good Night Stories for Rebel Girls
- 2017 - New York Times Bestseller - Good Night Stories for Rebel Girls 2
- 2017 - Book of the Year (Italy) - Good Night Stories for Rebel Girls
- 2018 - ABIA International Book of the Year (Australia) - Good Night Stories for Rebel Girls
- 2018 - Wissennschafts Buch des Jahres - Children's Book of the Year (Germany)- Good Night Stories for Rebel Girls
- 2018 - Best 30 Podcasts of the Year - Time Magazine - Good Night Stories for Rebel Girls
- 2018 - PW Star Watch Superstar
- 2018 - OUT 100 - Most Influential LBGTQ+ People of the Year
- 2023 - POD Italian Podcast Award - Nomination - Scintille
