= Logan Kim =

American actor

- Born: United States
- Occupation: Actor
- Years active: 2020–present

Logan Kim is an American actor. He is best known for his roles as Podcast in Ghostbusters: Afterlife (2021) and its 2024 sequel and Hershel Rhee in the post-apocalyptic horror drama series The Walking Dead: Dead City (2023–present).

== Career ==
At the age of 12, he was cast as the new character Podcast in the film Ghostbusters: Afterlife, which was originally set for release in 2020, but was pushed to November 2021 in response to the COVID-19 pandemic. He then reprised the role in the 2024 sequel Ghostbusters: Frozen Empire. In 2023, he appears as Hershel Rhee in the AMC post-apocalyptic horror drama television series The Walking Dead: Dead City. He is set to appear alongside Steven Yeun in the upcoming Netflix television series Pagans.

He is set to appear as the voice of Jason Todd / Red Hood in the upcoming 2028 superhero animated film Dynamic Duo, alongside Mason Thames.

== Filmography ==
=== Film ===
Year	Title	Role	Notes
2021	Ghostbusters: Afterlife	Podcast	
2024	Kung Fu Panda 4	Autograph Seeking Fan #2 (voice)	
2024	Ghostbusters: Frozen Empire	Podcast	
2028	Dynamic Duo	Jason Todd / Red Hood (voice)	In production

=== Television ===
Year	Title	Role	Notes
2020	Home Movie: The Princess Bride	The Grandson	Television miniseries
2023–present	The Walking Dead: Dead City	Hershel Rhee	Recurring (season 1); Main cast (season 2–present); 21 episodes
