= Rusted Caravaggios =

2020 short documentary film directed by Sam Abbas

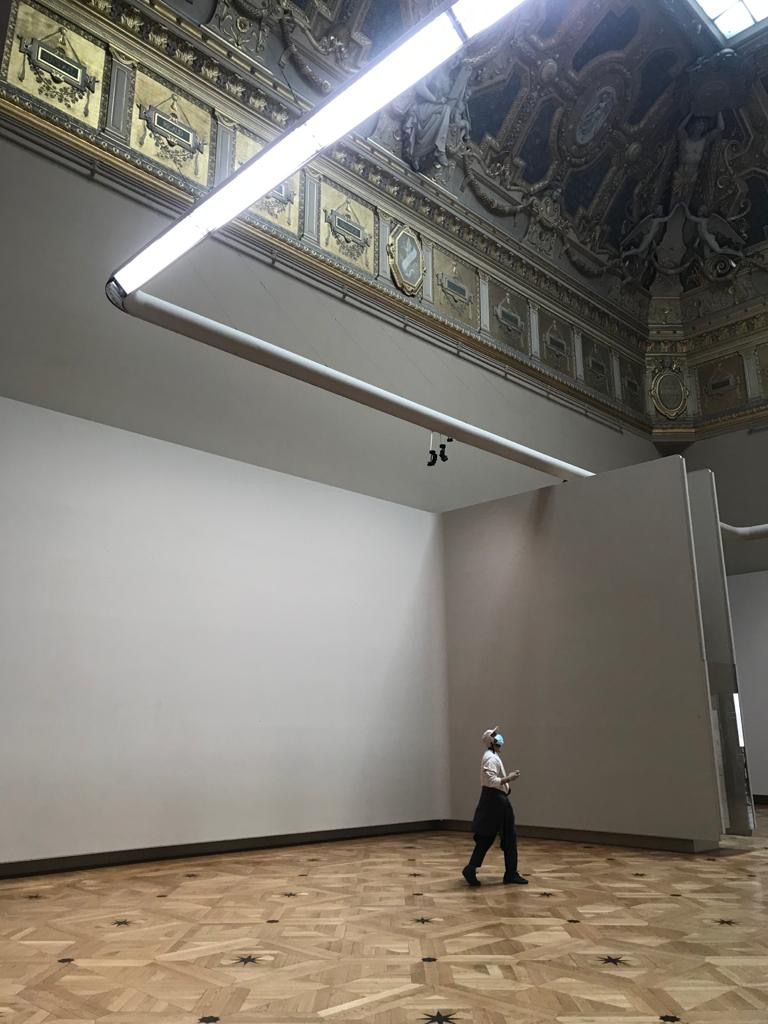
- Sam Abbas at the Louvre July 6, 2020.
- Directed by: Sam Abbas
- Cinematography: Sam Abbas
- Release date: July 13, 2020
- Running time: 2.5 minutes
- Country: France

Rusted Caravaggios is a 2020 French short documentary film about the first public invitation to the Louvre Museum (Monday July 6, 2020) following an unprecedented four-month closure amidst the COVID-19 pandemic.

== Background ==
On July 6, Paris' Louvre Museum reopened after being closed for several months amid the coronavirus pandemic. Art enthusiasts that traveled to the famous institution to view the well-known works were met with quite a different experience than they would have previously had before the spread of COVID-19 as they visited the gallery space. Only 7,000 people total with reserved tickets entered the space.

The documentary was produced by Abbas, his duties included director, cinematographer and sound recorder in showing a near-empty museum, which included a tableau with a man sitting still next to Leonardo da Vinci's Mona Lisa.
