= Alia's Birth =

- Poster
- Directed by: Sam Abbas
- Written by: Sam Abbas
- Produced by: Sam Abbas; Randleson Floyd; Tatiana Bears; Nicole Townsend
- Starring: Poorna Jagannathan; Nikohl Boosheri; Maya Kazan; Samuel H. Levine
- Cinematography: Soledad Rodríguez
- Edited by: Sam Abbas
- Production company: ArabQ Films
- Release date: August 26, 2021
- Country: United States
- Language: English

Alia's Birth is a 2021 independent drama film by Sam Abbas starring Poorna Jagannathan, Nikohl Boosheri, Maya Kazan, and Samuel H. Levine.

== Cast ==
- Poorna Jagannathan as Jaime
- Nikohl Boosheri as Tess
- Maya Kazan as Jenna
- Samuel H. Levine as Shadi
- Edward Akrout as Tom

== Production ==
In April 2019, it was announced Poorna Jagannathan, Nikohl Boosheri, were cast for Alia's Birth, with Sam Abbas directing the film. Tatiana Bears, Nicole Townsend and Abbas were producing, with Sig De Miguel and Stephen Vincent co-producing. Shortly after the rest of the cast was released.

Abbas released exclusively via The Hollywood Reporter a contest for female-filmmakers to submit their short works to be included in Alia's Birth. The response was tremendous, with hundreds of submissions He quoted, "While I can't talk much about the narrative, the importance of this short piece being female-directed is crucial, Alia's Birth is female-led, from the acting to behind the camera. I find it easier to communicate and collaborate when working with women. I grew up surrounded by amazing women, and my favorite films are led by women." Abbas also mentioned that the winner of the short film contest was filmmaker Sindha Agha.

== Release ==
In May 2020, The Hollywood Reporter released a first-look of the feature with major information. Abbas made it clear that the film was for theatrical viewings only. It would never have a life outside of theatres; no DVD/Blu-ray/VOD release. The film premiered on August 26, 2021.

=== Reception ===
The Guardian was the first to review saying "the sudden onrush of biological imperative gives this footage a gripping undeniability and focus that this loosely collaged account of a foundering Brooklyn relationship has been searching for".
