= Nikohl Boosheri =

Canadian actress

- Born: 3 September 1988 (age 37); Pakistan
- Citizenship: Canada, Iran
- Education: Performing Arts
- Alma mater: Simon Fraser University
- Occupation: Actress
- Years active: 2010–present

Nikohl Boosheri (Persian: نیکول بوشهری) is a Canadian actress of Iranian origin. She is best known for her role as Adena El-Amin on Freeform's The Bold Type.

== Biography ==
Boosheri was born in Pakistan to Iranian parents while they were fleeing Iran and moved to Canada when she was 2 months old. She has never been to Iran. She speaks English and Persian.

== Filmography ==
=== Film ===
Year	Title	Role	Notes
2011	Circumstance	Atafeh Hakimi	Best Actress Award at Noor Iranian Film Festival
2013	Farah Goes Bang	Farah Mahtab	
2018	The Wedding	Sara	
2020	Alia's Birth	Tess	
2021	See You Then	Julie	
2025	Rule Breakers	Roya Mahboob	

=== Television ===
Year	Title	Role	Notes
2010	Tower Prep	Assistant	Episode: "Snitch"
2012	Continuum	Laura Kellog	Episode: "Laura"
2013	Futurestates	Sonia Elhami	Episode: "Refuge"
2015	Seeds of Yesterday	Toni	Television film
2016	Supergirl	Kelly Sotto	Episode: "Changing"
2017–2021	The Bold Type	Adena El-Amin	Recurring role (season 1, 3–5), 14 episodes Main role (season 2), 8 episodes
2018	Altered Carbon	Nalan Ertekin	Episodes: "The Killers" and "In a Lonely Place"
