= Good Night Stories for Rebel Girls =

Children's book series

- Cover page of Volume 1
- Author: Elena Favilli, Francesca Cavallo
- Discipline: Children's non-fiction
- No. of books: 5
- Website: http://www.rebelgirls.com/

Good Night Stories for Rebel Girls is a series of two children's books, aimed at ages six and up. Both were funded through the crowdfunding website Kickstarter, and broke site records for fundraising for literature publication. The books each feature short stories about 100 real women who can be role models to children.

== Writing and publication ==
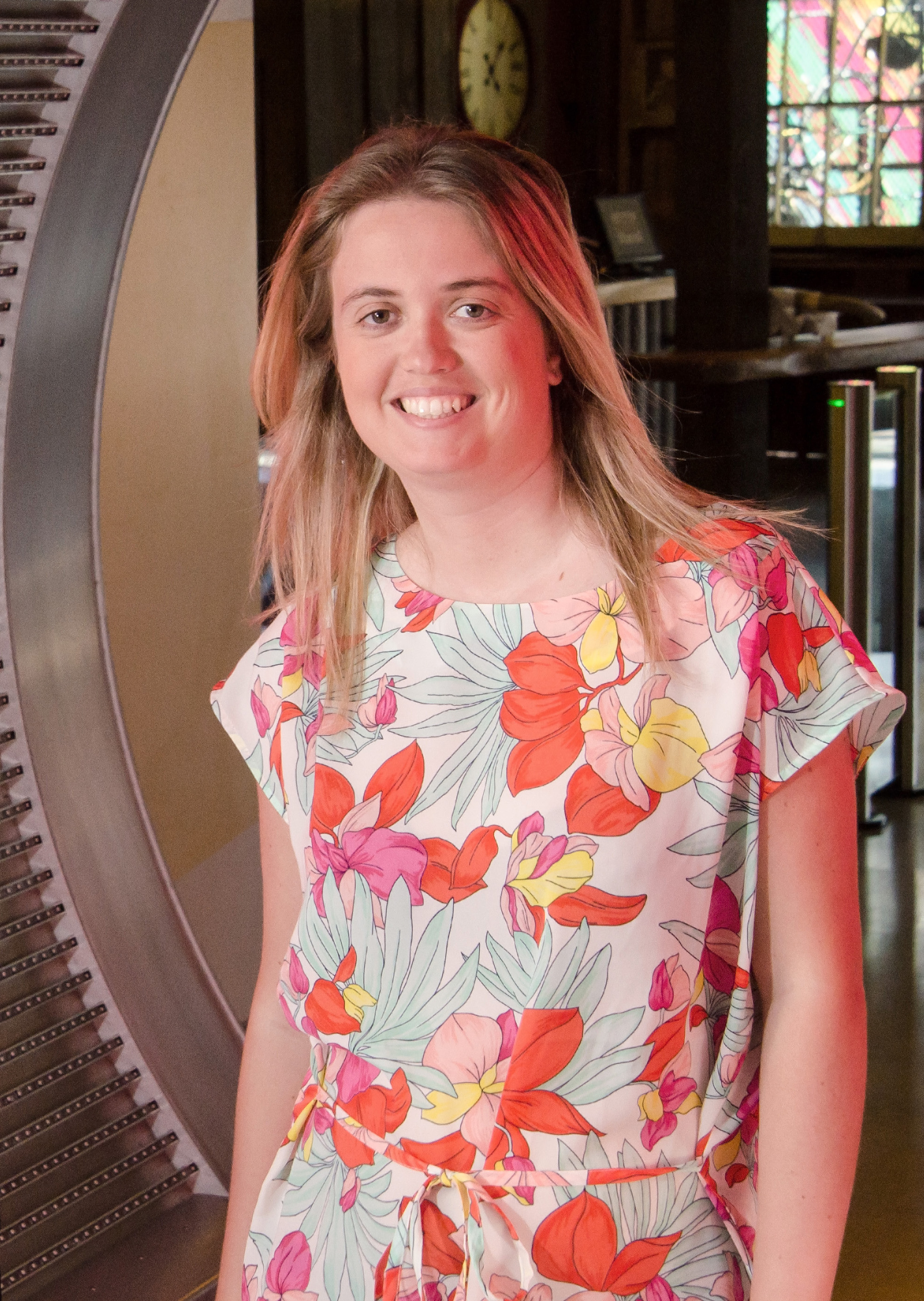
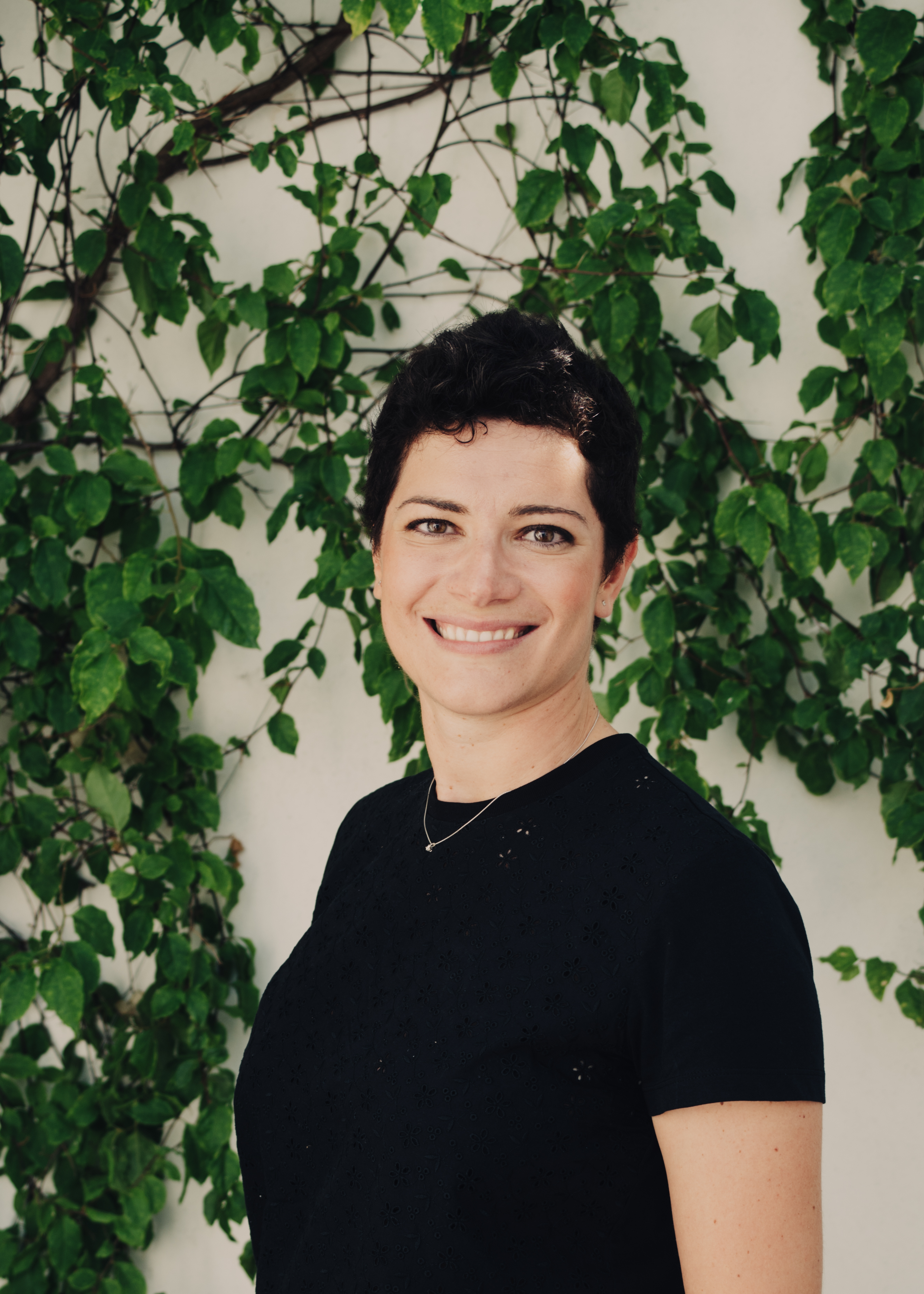
Elena Favilli (left) and Francesca Cavallo (right), authors of the Good Night Stories for Rebel Girls series.

The first volume of Good Night Stories for Rebel Girls was written by Elena Favilli and Francesca Cavallo, and it was published in 2016. The first and second volumes of Goodnight Stories were crowdfunded on Kickstarter, both breaking records on the website. The first volume was Kickstarter's "most funded children's book", raising over $675,000 (with an original goal of $40,000). The second volume was their "fastest-funded publishing project" ever.

Each book in the series dedicates one page to the story of 100 women (all with illustrations by woman artists and cover artwork made by PemberleyPond) who can be role models to children. The women come from different backgrounds, eras, and are culturally diverse and have a wide variety of occupations. Examples of entries include Mary Kom, Malala Yousafzai, Alicia Alonso, Manal al-Sharif, J. K. Rowling, Irena Sendlerowa, and Lella Lombardi.

An expanded version of the book was published in 2025, featuring 22 additional stories.

== Reception ==
Good Night Stories has sold over one million copies, and has been translated into more than 47 languages. They have received praise for being an alternative to the stereotypical portrayal of girls and women in fiction (such as the Disney Princess), or books about heroes which primarily focus on male protagonists. It focuses on telling young girls that they can grow up to be whatever they wish, regardless of what other people think.

In September 2019, the Turkish government’s board for the protection of minors from obscene publications ruled that book could only be sold to adults and must be concealed from view in shops, stating that "some of the writings in the book will a detrimental influence on the minds of those under the age of 18."

The inclusion of Aung San Suu Kyi in the book has received criticism for her failure to condemn the ongoing Rohingya persecution in Myanmar. Favilli and Cavallo have commented that they are considering (but have not committed to) removing her from future printings of the book.

Tricia Lowther criticised the book's title for gender exclusivity, feeling it implies only girls should learn about the women in the book.

== Spin-offs ==
The same team published several spin-offs of the original book, including 100 Immigrant Women Who Changed the World and Rebel Girls Celebrate Pride, as well as a series aimed at teenagers, Growing Up Powerful.

Local spin-offs were released in some countries, such as 100 Extraordinary Brazilians in Brazil, telling stories about Brazilian women such as Clarice Lispector, Conceição Evaristo, Dilma Rousseff and Marielle Franco.

The book series inspired a similar book series aimed at a male audience, Stories for Boys Who Dare to be Different, written by Ben Brooks, and illustrated by Quinton Winter. Ben Brooks and Quinton Winter also collaborated on a book aimed at a gender-neutral demographic, containing a mix of male and female role models, Stories for Kids Who Dare to be Different.
