= Elena Favilli =

Italian author, and entrepreneur

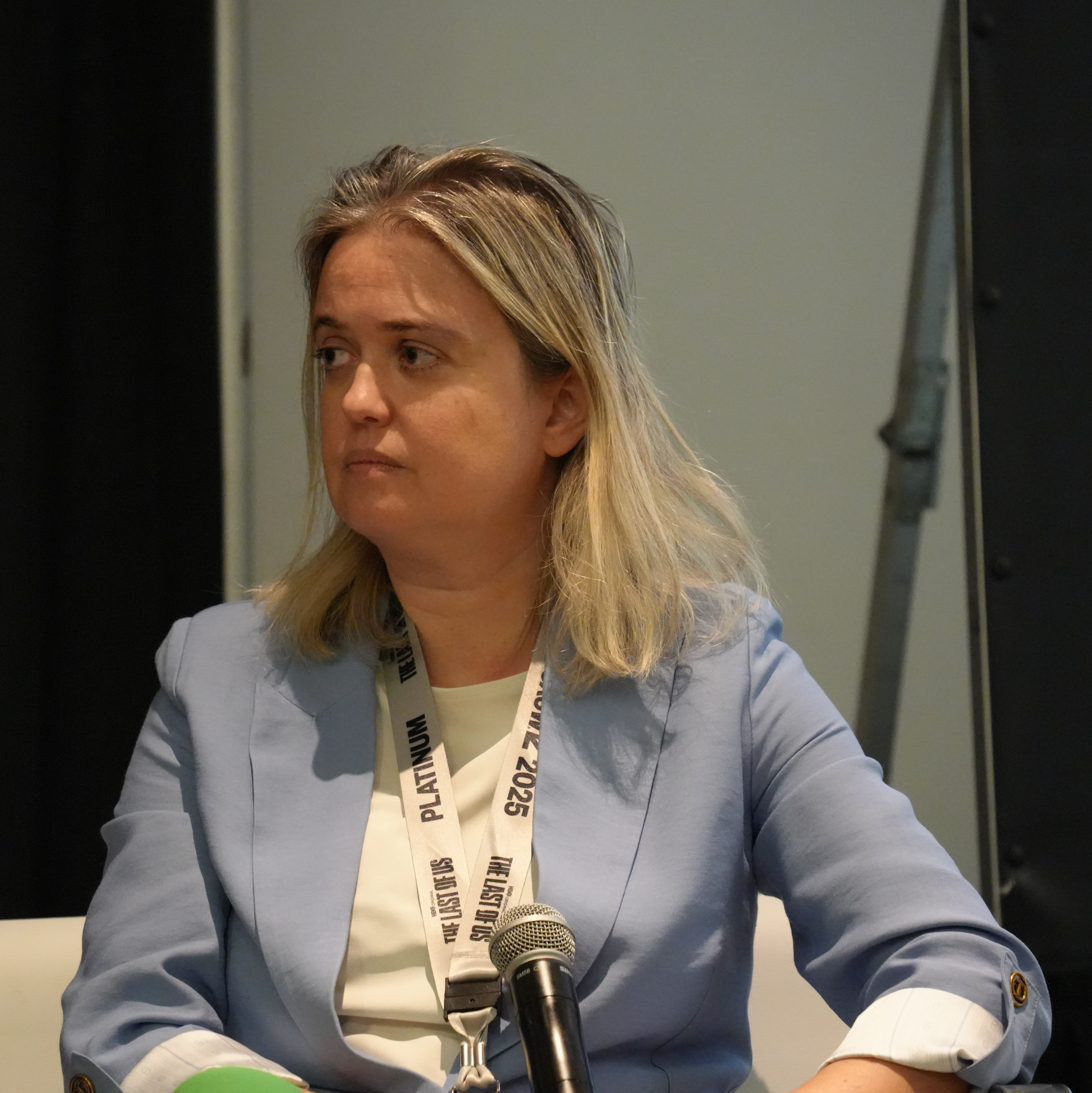
- Favilli in 2025
- Born: August 3, 1982 (age 44); Montevarchi, Tuscany, Italy
- Education: University of Bologna; University of California, Berkeley
- Occupations: CEO and founder of Rebel Girls
- Known for: Author and creator of Good Night Stories for Rebel Girls

Elena Favilli (born 3 August 1982) is an Italian-American author, speaker, and media entrepreneur.

== Biography ==
Elena Favilli is the founder and Chief Creative Officer of digital media company Rebel Girls. Favilli is the co-author of the Good Night Stories for Rebel Girls children's books. The books were praised for introducing young girls to real-life role models, like Oprah, J. K. Rowling, Ruth Bader Ginsburg, and Frida Kahlo, while recognizing the achievements of women throughout history.

Before writing Good Night Stories for Rebel Girls, Favilli worked as a journalist. She has written for The Guardian, COLORS Magazine, McSweeney’s, Vogue, RAI, Il Post, and La Repubblica.

Rebel Girls was founded by Favilli in 2016, with a mission to highlight the lives of important women throughout history. To date, Rebel Girls has sold more than 11 million books in 62 languages and reached 55 million digital audio listens. Award recognition includes New York Times bestseller list, 2022 Apple Design Award for Social Impact, 10 Webby Awards, and more.

Favilli is the creator and executive producer of Good Night Stories for Rebel Girls: The Podcast. Every episode features the story of a woman from Good Night Stories for Rebel Girls, narrated by influential women like Melinda Gates, Priscilla Chan, Jameela Jamil, and Tarana Burke. The podcast has received many accolades and awards, including multiple Webby Awards and Signal Awards.

In November 2020, Rebel Girls published Good Night Stories for Rebel Girls: 100 Immigrant Women Who Changed the World, also written by Favilli.

As of December 2024, Favilli was residing in Brooklyn, NY.

== Works ==
- Good Night Stories for Rebel Girls Volume 1
- Good Night Stories for Rebel Girls Volume 2
- Good Night Stories for Rebel Girls: 100 Immigrant Women Who Changed the World (October 2020)
- Favilli, Elena (28 February 2015). "Silicon valley is more Flintstones than Jetsons when it comes to women". The Guardian.
- Favilli, Elena (3 June 2020). "Elsa Schiaparelli: la vita della stilista raccontata come una fiaba". Vogue Italy.
- Favilli, Elena (3 January 2022). "Veronica Yoko Plebani is the cover star of Vogue Italia January Issue". Vogue Italy.
