= WWRL =

Radio station in New York City

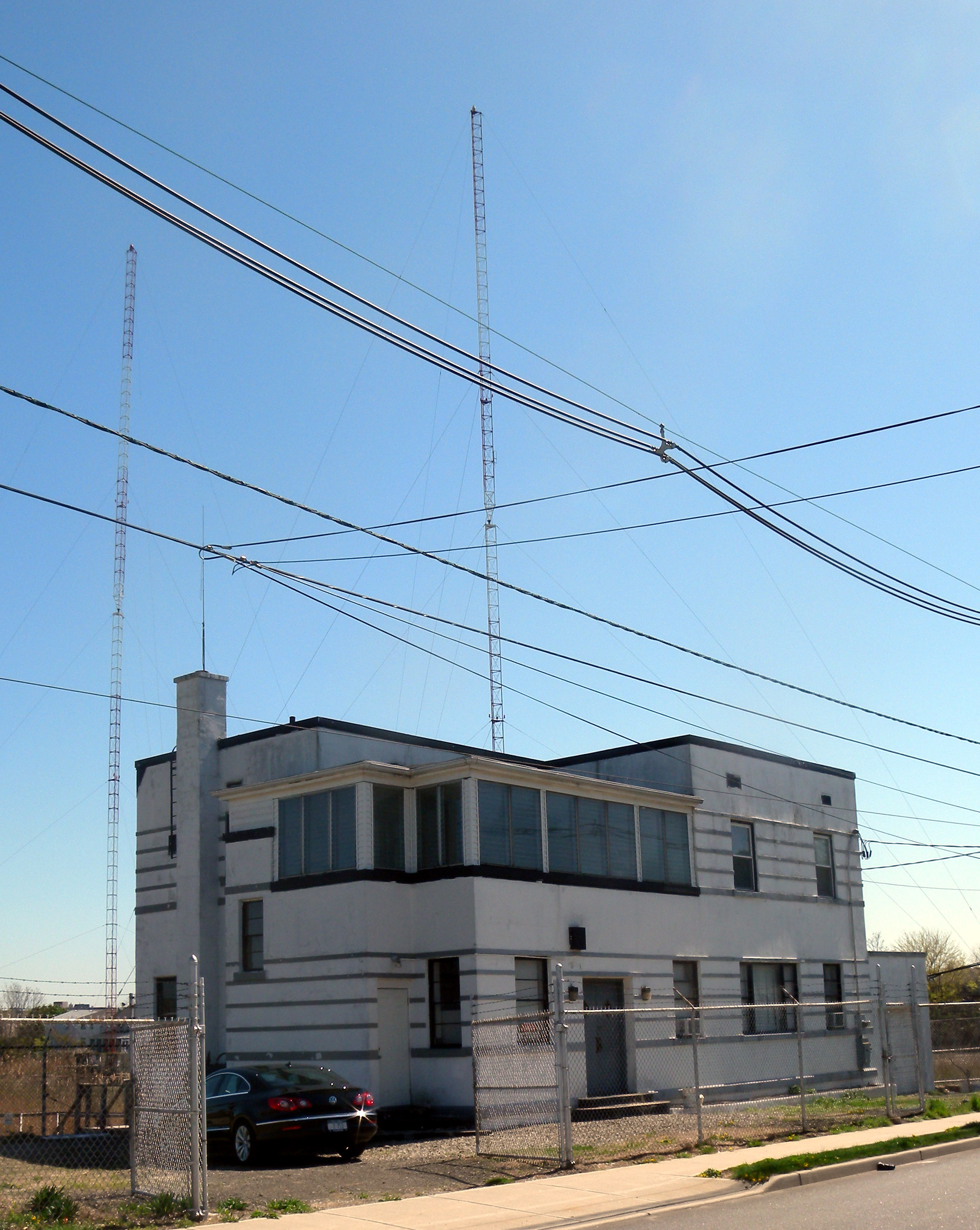
- Transmitter building in Secaucus, New Jersey
- New York, New York; United States
- Broadcast area: New York metropolitan area
- Frequency: 1600 kHz
- Branding: New York's BIN 1600

Programming
- Language: English
- Format: All-news radio
- Network: Black Information Network

Ownership
- Owner: iHeartMedia; (IHM Licenses LLC)
- Sister stations: WAXQ; WHTZ; WKTU; WLTW; WOR; WWPR-FM

History
- First air date: August 26, 1926
- Call sign meaning: Woodside Radio Laboratory

Technical information
- Licensing authority: FCC
- Facility ID: 68906
- Class: B
- Power: 25,000 watts (day); 5,000 watts (night)
- Transmitter coordinates: 40°47′44.4″N 74°3′16.5″W
- Repeater: 105.1 WWPR-FM HD3 (New York)

Links
- Public license information: Public file; LMS
- Webcast: Listen live (via iHeartRadio)
- Website: newyork.binnews.com

WWRL (1600 kHz) is a commercial AM radio station licensed to serve New York, New York, owned by iHeartMedia, Inc. The station airs an all-news radio format as an affiliate of the Black Information Network (BIN).

Founded in 1926, WWRL originally had a multi-lingual format serving the various ethnic communities of New York City. The station took on a mostly Spanish identity in the 1950s, then became primarily oriented towards African Americans in the mid-1960s, under the direction of news director Dick London, who invited community leaders to voice their concerns publicly on air, as the station became an advocate for legislative change. The music and news advocacy was an integral part of the Black American community. WWRL played R&B music from 1964 to 1982, before changing to urban contemporary gospel music and religious programming from 1982 to 1997.

After a brief return to R&B in the late 1990s, WWRL gradually de-emphasized music in favor of more talk radio programming. In 2006, WWRL replaced 1190 WLIB as the flagship station for the Air America Radio network and retained a progressive talk radio format for seven years.

From 2014 to 2016, WWRL had a regional Mexican music format before changing to South Asian programming as an affiliate of Radio Zindagi. Since 2020, the station has served as the New York City outlet for iHeartRadio's Black Information Network service. Ethel Merman began her career singing on WWRL; notable hosts in WWRL's history include Frankie Crocker, Al Sharpton, Steve Malzberg, Mark Riley, and Richard Bey.

== History ==
=== Early history (1926–1963) ===
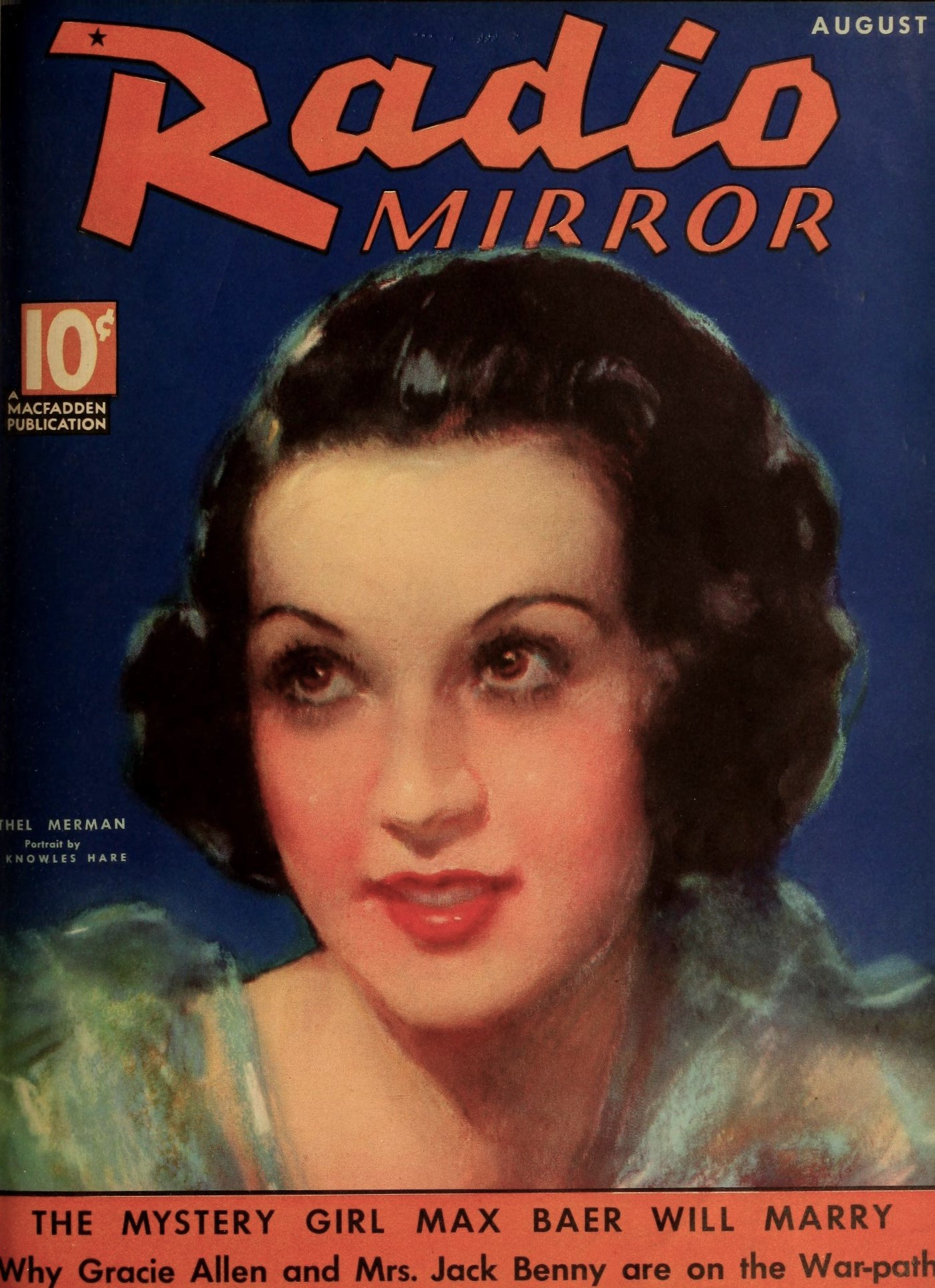
Ethel Merman's career in show business had early roots as a live performing artist on WWRL during the station's first years of operation.

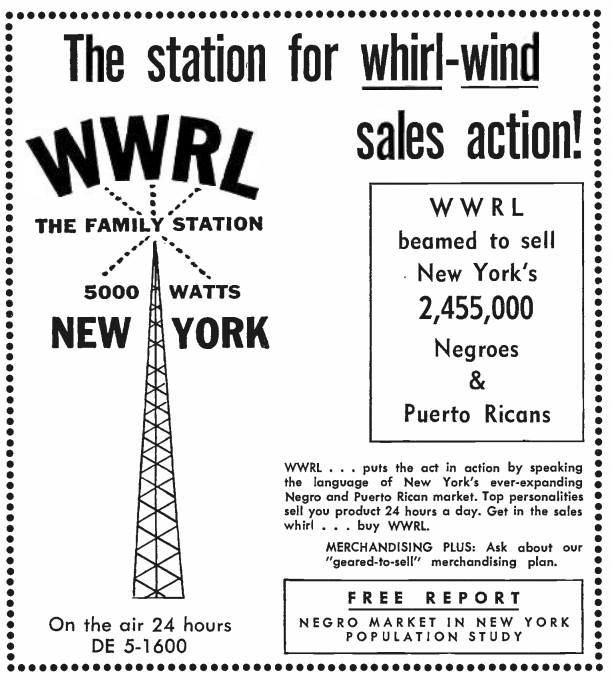
1959 station advertisement.

Founded by radio enthusiast William Reuman, doing business as Woodside Radio Laboratory, WWRL signed on at midnight on August 26, 1926, from a studio and transmitter located in his home at 41-30 58th Street in Woodside, Queens. It originally broadcast on 1160 kHz. In its first year of operation, WWRL broadcast live musical performances, usually from Reuman's friends and neighbors. Among them were Astoria singer Ethel Zimmerman, who would later achieve stardom as Ethel Merman.

WWRL began operations during a chaotic period when most government regulation had been suspended, with new stations free to be set up with few restriction. Following the reestablishment of government control by the formation of the Federal Radio Commission (FRC), the new regulators issued a series of temporary authorizations beginning on May 3, 1927, with WWRL at first continuing to be assigned to 1160 kHz, which a month later was changed to 1120 kHz. Stations were also informed that if they wanted to continue operating, they needed to file a formal license application by January 15, 1928, as the first step in determining whether they met the new "public interest, convenience, or necessity" standard. On May 25, 1928, the FRC issued General Order 32, which notified 164 stations, including WWRL, that "From an examination of your application for future license it does not find that public interest, convenience, or necessity would be served by granting it." However, the station successfully convinced the commission that it should remain licensed.

On November 11, 1928, the FRC implemented a major reallocation of station transmitting frequencies, as part of a reorganization resulting from its implementation of General Order 40. WWRL was assigned to 1500 kHz, sharing this frequency with three other regional stations.

In 1927, Reuman had begun selling commercial airtime to local merchants, and in 1929 incorporated as the Long Island Broadcasting Corporation. With the slogan "The Voice of Queens County," WWRL began to broadcast programs in Italian, German, French, Polish, Hungarian, Slovak, and Czech, as well as English.

Following implementation of the 1941 North American Regional Broadcasting Agreement the station again changed its frequency, first to 1490 kHz on April 29 that year, then within the year to 1600 kHz, where the station remains to this day. Initially the 1600 kHz assignment had a timeshare partner, WCNW, however in 1942 that station moved to 1190 kHz, which meant WWRL could now operate with unlimited hours. In 1951 WWRL's city of license changed from Woodside to New York City. Most programs on the station were oriented towards Hispanic and Black listeners, and Greek, Syrian, Irish, Ukrainian, Russian, and Scandinavian shows also joined the schedule. By decade's end, WWRL had a 24-hour broadcast day primarily in Spanish. Leading black disc jockeys joined the station, including Tommy Smalls (known as "Dr. Jive") and Hal Jackson.

=== R&B format (1964–1982) ===
Egmont Sonderling bought WWRL from the retiring Reuman in January 1964, and changed its format to R&B. WWRL was "the premier radio station serving New York's Black community" at the time, wrote Dan Charnas. Billboard magazine wrote in May 1964 that WWRL and black radio stations offered "specific information, personal identification[,] and entertainment not provided by other type stations."

DJ's for WWRL in the 1960s included Frankie Crocker and Jocko Henderson, whose "on-air shtick... was as important as the music they played." The station was known as "The Big RL" in the 1960s and "Super 16" in the 1970s.

WWRL's first year in its R&B format included a three-hour urban gospel music show in the evenings. Billboard wrote in May 1964 that WWRL and other black radio stations "are monitored as a guide to which r.&b. records could be popular with white audiences... [and] are exerting a great influence on the music played on contemporary and pop-contemporary formatted stations."

Beginning in May 1966, WWRL instituted an "integrated music programming policy" that added rock and pop hits in addition to R&B to the playlist. By late 1967, however, WWRL began playing more blues tracks and those from lesser-known performers like Johnnie Taylor and Wilson Pickett, to distinguish itself from mainstream pop stations that had begun playing R&B. A 1971 profile of WWRL by Billboard found that WWRL played "three oldies an hour from one of the largest vaults of soul music in the nation."

The Federal Communications Commission reprimanded Sonderling Broadcasting in May 1971 for allowing the Reverend James Lofton Jr. to use WWRL facilities to solicit money in exchange for tips for a numbers game.

On June 5, 1972, WWRL simulcast with WMCA from 8 to 10 p.m. for a special call-in program, Black and White, owing to WMCA focusing on a general audience in contrast to WWRL's primarily black audience.

Briefly in the late 1970s, WWRL was an affiliate of the Mutual Black Network.

In 1979, Sonderling Broadcasting merged with Viacom. WWRL carried sports talk programming from Enterprise Radio Network briefly in 1981, beginning on January 1. In an era when sports programming on radio was limited to live play-by-play, news briefs, and a select few call-in shows, Enterprise was described as an "abortive attempt to launch the all-sports format" and shut down before year's end. By the spring of 1981, WWRL went back to playing music.

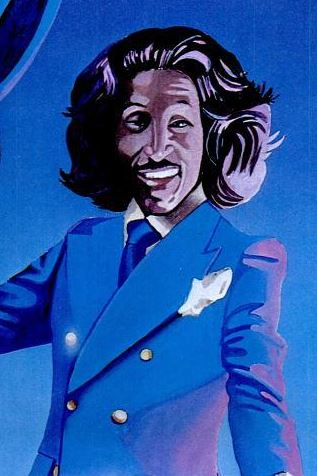
Caricature of Frankie Crocker used for a radio trade magazine advertisement; Crocker later became famous for developing and naming the urban contemporary format.

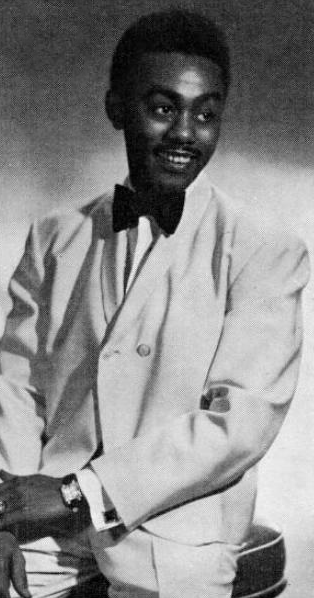
Johnnie Taylor

=== Religious and community station (1982–1997) ===
In 1982, Viacom donated WWRL to the United Negro College Fund, which immediately sold the station to National Black Network subsidiary Unity Broadcasting. On August 14, 1982, Unity changed WWRL's format to Christian talk and teaching. Replacing the contemporary R&B were urban gospel and reggae music, plus worship services from local black churches were broadcast live on evenings and weekends.

By that time, increasing competition from FM stations like WBLS decreased the appeal of AM music stations, to the point that even the once-dominant WABC ended its popular music format in 1982, switching to talk radio.

WWRL also broadcast rallies and meetings held by the Reverend Al Sharpton. These rallies included a controversial one on September 9, 1995, in which Sharpton claimed that Jewish building owner Fred Harari wanted to evict a record store so that a "white interloper" could "expand his business on 125th Street." Following that comment, Harari's business, a clothing store named Freddy's Fashion Mart, was destroyed in an arson, leading to eight deaths. The New York Times later said this comment "was later widely blamed for fomenting racial tension." The Freddy's Fashion Mart controversy was just one of several instances of anti-Semitism said to be broadcast on WWRL.

==== Community Chorale ====
Beginning in 1985, the station also sponsored a choir with around 70 members called the WWRL Community Chorale, which grew to nearly 100 members by 1996. The Community Chorale toured 26 cities in Germany in December 1996.

==== Technical improvements ====
In the fall of 1996, the Federal Communications Commission (FCC) approved WWRL's request to increase its power from 5 kW to 25 kW.

To resolve issues of co-channel interference, WWRL bought and later shut down three nearby stations on the 1600 or 1590 frequencies: WERA 1590 in Plainfield, New Jersey, WLNG 1600 in Sag Harbor, New York, and WQQW 1590 in Waterbury, Connecticut. WWRL's signal could be better heard in the suburbs of New York by removing these other stations from the airwaves. By this time, WWRL used the slogan "The Spirit of New York".

=== From R&B oldies to urban talk (1997–2006) ===
WWRL logo from 2004 to 2006.

In April 1997, WWRL reduced gospel programming to Sundays, a move that drew criticism from former program director Reverend Paul Stephens. On April 16, WWRL switched to an R&B oldies format nicknamed "100% Pure Soul". It played music from the 1960s and 1970s, in a nod to what its vice president of programming called the station's "golden age."

To distinguish itself from FM urban contemporary stations WBIX and WRKS, starting in the summer of 1999, WWRL devoted Saturdays to playing Caribbean music, and added R&B from the 1950s and earlier to its playlist. Additionally, WWRL added brokered talk shows to the weekday lineup that year.

In 2001, WWRL was sold to Access.1 Communications Corporation, an African-American owned and operated radio broadcasting company. By then, WWRL began playing more Caribbean music during the week beyond Saturdays.

In 2002, WWRL added a popular morning 6-10 a.m. "drive time" show co-hosted by Peter Noel, a Black advocacy journalist tied to Al Sharpton, and white Orthodox Rabbi Shmuley Boteach, The Peter and Shmuley Show. Barnard College sociology professor Jonathan Rieder called the show "an interracial buddy pair, the radio equivalent of Lethal Weapon". The station reported that after the introduction of the show, it saw a 90% increase in white and Hispanic listeners. Rabbi Boteach resigned in June 2003 shortly after his co-host Noel did the same; Boteach alleged that station management changed his morning show's format from "harmonious to adversarial."

The station also broadcast New York Liberty basketball games. By the beginning of 2003, WWRL had talk shows for most of the week, with music only broadcast on weekends, specifically Caribbean on Saturdays and gospel on Sundays.

WWRL subsequently added local shows hosted by Karen Hunter, Steve Malzberg, and Armstrong Williams among others, in addition to nationally syndicated shows from Larry Elder and Alan Colmes.

=== Progressive talk station (2006–2014) ===
The final logo of the WWRL talk radio format. Variations of this logo had been used since 2006.

In August 2006, WWRL became the flagship station for Air America, a progressive talk radio network that had previously broadcast on 1190 WLIB. Beginning on October 29, 2007, Mark Riley and New York television personality Richard Bey co-hosted the WWRL morning show. Bey resigned in March 2008. New York Daily News columnist Errol Louis became the morning host beginning in mid-July 2008.

In January 2010, after Air America shut down, WWRL brought back Mark Riley as morning host and added syndicated liberal hosts such as Ed Schultz, Thom Hartmann, Stephanie Miller, Randi Rhodes, and Al Sharpton.

On December 13, 2013, WWRL announced it would change format to regional Mexican music in Spanish, citing low advertising revenue as a reason. New York's growing Mexican-American community had no other stations playing music of their homeland.

=== Ethnic formats (2014–2020) ===
Following a few days of stunting, WWRL launched a regional Mexican music format and brand "La Invasora" on January 5, 2014.

On February 1, 2016, WWRL changed its format to Indian and South Asian talk and music as part of the Radio Zindagi network. Ten days later, Access.1 Communications sold WWRL to NJ Broadcasting, LLC for $7 million. WWRL also added an HD Radio simulcast on WKXW-HD2 for listeners in central and southern New Jersey.

=== Sale to iHeartMedia, BIN (2020–present) ===
On September 10, 2020, iHeartMedia announced its intent to acquire WWRL for an undisclosed amount. It began operating the station under a local marketing agreement (LMA) on November 2 as the New York City outlet of the all-news radio formatted Black Information Network (BIN). The flip marked a return to the station's heritage of airing formats serving the region's African-American community. The purchase, at a price of $8.5 million, was consummated on July 26, 2021.

== Technical information ==
By day, WWRL broadcasts at 25,000 watts; at night, to protect other stations on 1600 AM, it reduces power to 5,000 watts. It uses a directional antenna at all times. Its transmitter is on Radio Avenue in Secaucus, New Jersey, near the Hackensack River. WWRL's studios are at 125 West 55th Street in Midtown Manhattan with other iHeart New York stations.

WWRL is also simulcast WWPR-FM's third HD Radio subchannel and is available online via iHeartRadio.
