= WKXW =

News/talk radio station in Trenton, New Jersey

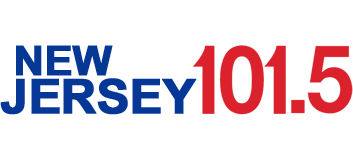
- Trenton, New Jersey; United States
- Broadcast area: Central Jersey
- Frequency: 101.5 MHz (HD Radio)
- Branding: New Jersey 101.5

Programming
- Format: News/talk (weekdays); Classic hits (weekends)
- Subchannels: HD2: Beach Radio (oldies); HD3: Radio Zindagi (South Asian)

Ownership
- Owner: Townsquare Media; (Townsquare License, LLC)
- Sister stations: WCHR; WPST

History
- First air date: August 27, 1962
- Former call signs: WBUD-FM (1962–1967); WBJH (1967–1979); WTRT (1979–1980); WKXW-FM (1980–1981); WKXW (1981–2002); WKXW-FM (2002–2006)
- Call sign meaning: Two "W's" bookending "Kix" (former branding)

Technical information
- Licensing authority: FCC
- Facility ID: 53458
- Class: B
- ERP: 15,500 watts (analog); 617 watts (digital)
- HAAT: 275 m (902 ft)
- Transmitter coordinates: 40°16′58.4″N 74°41′9.6″W

Links
- Public license information: Public file; LMS
- Webcast: Listen live; HD2: Listen live
- Website: nj1015.com; HD2: mybeachradio.com

WKXW (101.5 MHz, "New Jersey 101.5") is a commercial radio station licensed to Trenton, New Jersey. It is owned by Townsquare Media with studios and offices on Walters Avenue in the township of Ewing. On weekdays, the station has a talk radio format. On weekends and major holidays, it switches to classic hits. The station is strongly branded to a New Jersey identity.

The talk shows of WKXW have had an influence upon the politics of New Jersey ever since the early 1990s, when their hosts' populist and anti-establishment stances were reflected in promotion of a popular revolt against a proposed statewide tax increase, and which led to incumbents being defeated for reelection in several different races. The morning drive time slot has been especially influential, with longtime radio veteran Jim Gearhart hosting it for twenty-five years, followed by Bill Spadea, who used the post as a springboard to campaign for governor before returning to the role. The weekend music part of the station's format is anchored by Big Joe Henry, who in 2026 was named to the New Jersey Hall of Fame.

WKXW is a Class B FM station with an effective radiated power (ERP) of 16,500 watts. Its transmitter tower is shared with 103.3 WPRB and is near the Quaker Bridge Mall in Lawrence Township. WKXW broadcasts using HD Radio technology and airs oldies on its HD2 subchannel and Radio Zindagi on its HD3 one.

== History ==
=== Easy listening, AC and oldies ===
The station signed on the air on August 27, 1962. Its original call sign was WBUD-FM, the sister station of WBUD (1260 AM, now WFJS). WBUD-FM had an automated easy listening format. The call letters changed in 1967 to WBJH.

The station's call sign changed to WTRT in 1979 and rebranded as "The New T-101 FM". In 1980, the station's call sign was changed to WKXW-FM, under its new owner Fidelity Communications. It was playing a hot adult contemporary format as "The All New Kix 101 & A 1/2 FM" and later "Kix 101.5". By the late 1980s, the station evolved into a gold-based adult contemporary format. Its weekend Saturday oldies show evolved into an all oldies format from the 1950s through early 1970s on overnights and weekends.

=== Switch to talk ===
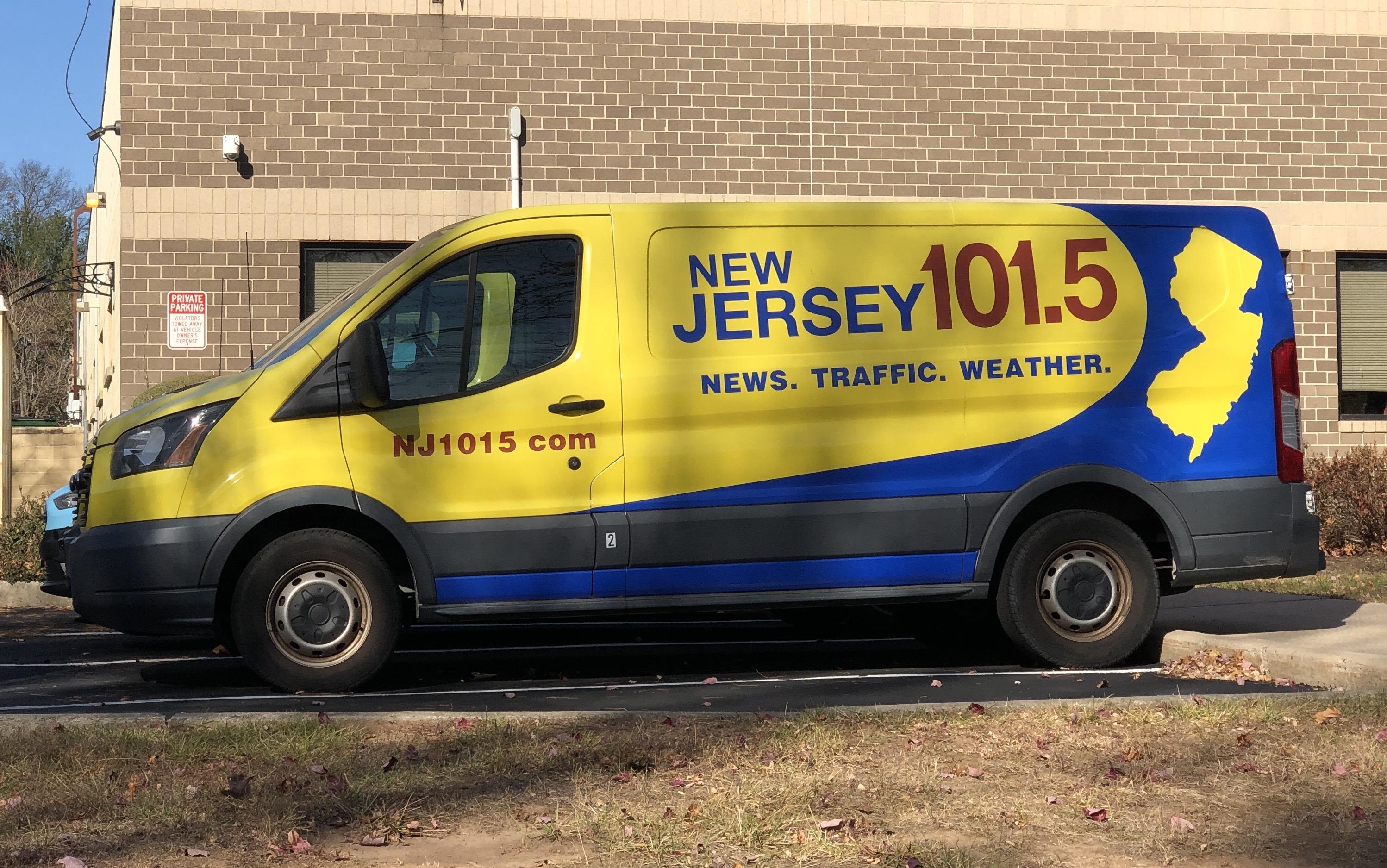
NJ 101.5 news van

In 1990, WKXW-FM was sold to Press Communications, parent company of the Asbury Park Press newspaper. On March 1, 1990, at 5 pm, "New Jersey 101.5" became the first full-time FM talk station in America targeted for a younger audience.

The format was conceived by Walter Sabo, the CEO of Sabo Media. When asked "What is your format?", Sabo's answer was: "New Jersey." This was exemplified by the station hiring a full-time meteorologist to give the weather in different areas of New Jersey. Mark Sheppard, who later went to middays, kicked off the format playing Bill Haley & The Comets' "Rock Around The Clock".

Since the 1990s, the station has a talk format during the week, with oldies music on the overnights and weekend. Initially, the oldies playlist was 1960s-based with a few pre-1964 oldies and a 1970s oldie or two each hour. By the early-to-mid-1990s, more 1970s music was added and by the early-2000s, 1980s music from 1980 to 1982 was added occasionally. Between 2000 and 2005, music from between 1986 and 1989 was added to the lineups. Gradually, at the same time, songs from 1964 and older were gradually reduced in the late-1990s and gone by 2000. In September 2007, 1960s music was removed from the "60s, 70s, and 80s" weekend music programming ID, and nearly all 1960s music had been removed from the playlist.

In the mid-to-late-1990s, music was ended on weekday overnights. That shift now has replays of daytime shows. Music is now heard only on weekends and some holidays. The format has been concisely expressed on-air as "Weekdays we talk, weekends we rock!"

The Millennium Radio Group acquired the station in 2001. A decade later, in 2011, California-based Oaktree Capital signed a deal to buy the Millennium Radio Group. After taking over, Oaktree transferred the Millennium stations to Townsquare Media, the owner of multiple radio stations around the U.S.

=== Simulcasts and news network ===
The station has, at times, provided a simulcast on various AM and FM stations in the Atlantic City area, beyond the reach of its main transmitter. The most recent simulcast ceased in June 2009 when 97.3 FM in Millville (now WENJ) changed formats to ESPN Radio. WKXW-FM's morning show was also simulcast for a time on regional cable network CN8 in the late 1990s and early 2000s. Cameras were mounted in the radio studio showing the station's personalities to TV viewers.

WKXW-FM is the flagship station of the "Townsquare New Jersey News Network" as heard on twelve radio stations throughout the state. The network consists of WPST in Trenton, WOBM-FM in Toms River, WJLK (AM) in Lakewood, WCHR-FM in Manahawkin, WJLK-FM in Asbury Park, WOBM (AM) in Asbury Park, WFPG in Atlantic City, WSJO in Egg Harbor City, WPUR in Atlantic City, and WENJ in Atlantic City. Various bureaus throughout the state share stories with the Ewing headquarters.

=== New Jersey-centric branding ===
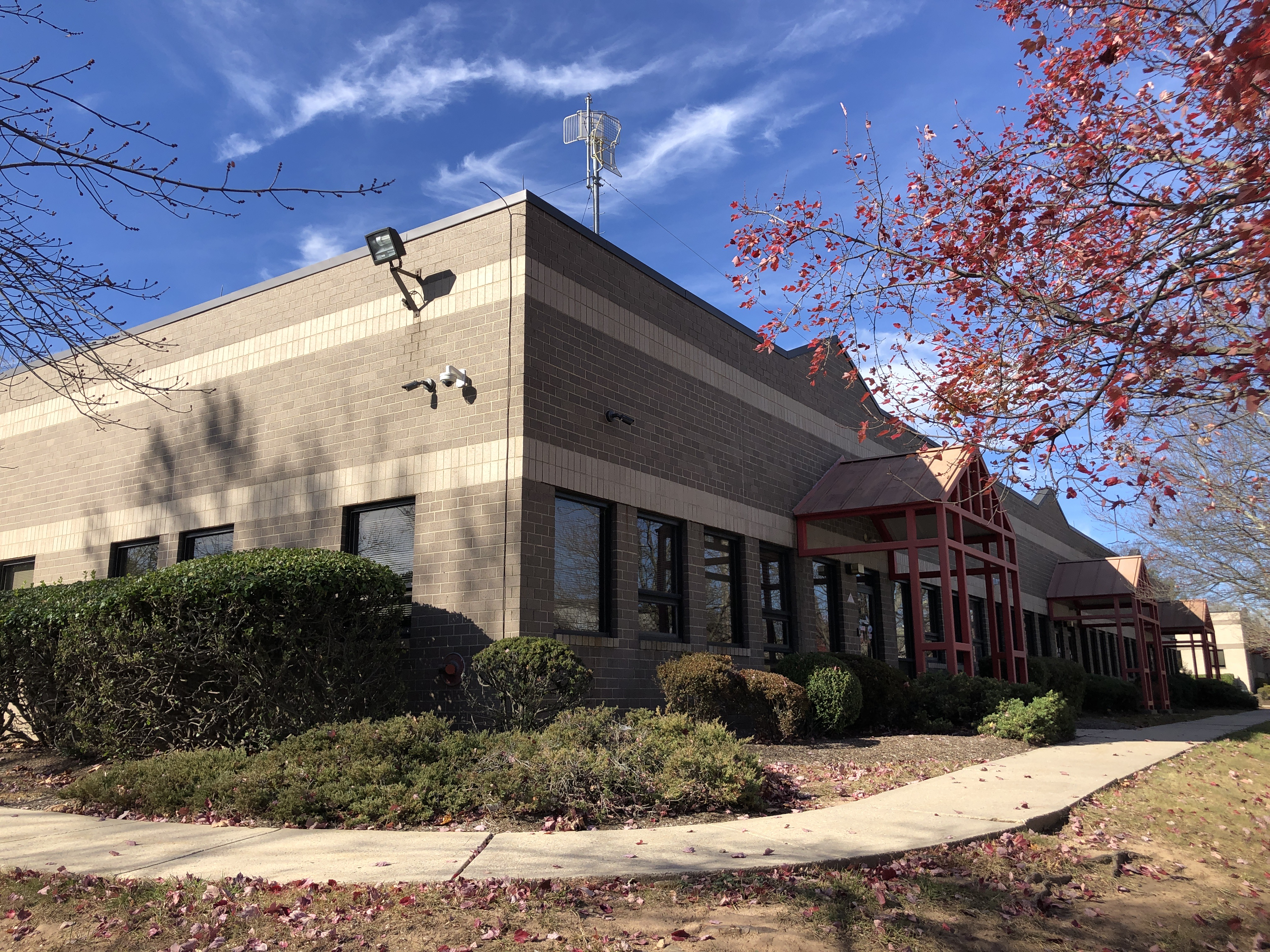
The NJ 101.5 studios are at the Townsquare Media office in Ewing, co-located with the studios for 94.5 WPST, 1040 WCHR and 920 WNJE

The station strongly brands its New Jersey identity with its bumper messages intoning "Not New York. Not Philadelphia. Proud to be New Jersey!" The message is repeated enough to resemble a mantra. It calls its traffic reports New Jersey Fast Traffic and weather forecasts are New Jersey Instant Weather. In reporting traffic, the station refers to traffic direction on bridges and tunnels as "entering New Jersey" or "leaving New Jersey" instead of the more traditional designations of "into the city/inbound" or "out of the city/outbound". Current temperatures of different towns in New Jersey are given after the weather reports.

The rarely uses its call sign and instead refers to itself by the New Jersey 101.5 moniker.

Despite the station's branding, the 101.5 signal does not reach some parts of the state.. Most of Cape May, Salem and Sussex Counties are outside the station's signal. Coverage of Atlantic, Bergen, Cumberland and Hudson Counties is spotty at best. Listeners in New Jersey not in the signal range and even out-of-state listeners can hear the station via streaming.

=== Political influence ===
From the beginning of its "New Jersey 101.5" talk format in 1990, the station has exerted an influence upon the state's politics, with plenty of angry listeners calling in and the station's talk show hosts staking out stances that were populist and anti-establishment. There was discontent over income taxes, property taxes, state bureaucracy, auto insurance rates, and various other matters. Political content was emphasized during the two drive-time shifts: with longtime industry veteran Jim Gearhart, whose persona was described as "avuncular" by the New York Times, in the morning, and the more heated John and Ken show in the afternoon. (Midday and evening shows tended to be more oriented towards lifestyle and relationship subjects.) The listeners calling in were often viscerally angry in their emotions. The station's announcements said things like, "Now you're in charge of the government. Listen to New Jersey 101.5. Stop higher taxes. Stop higher tolls."

The new format coincided with Governor Jim Florio's proposed $2.8 billion tax increase in the state. This especially roused the anger of the station's listenership, and Gearhart criticized the increase every morning on his show. During 1990, the station's hosts and callers had an important role in the creation of Hands Across New Jersey, a group of citizens against tax increases. The organization's founders often spoke on air and the station's hosts led efforts to castigate Florio. Longtime New Jersey politician Joseph Doria referred to the station's hosts as "rabble rousers".

The new format was popular, with the station moving to first place in the Arbitron ratings for the Central New Jersey area, a sharp rise from the eighth place it had been in before.

The anti-tax backlash and the station's involvement in it nearly caused Senator Bill Bradley to lose his re-election bid in the 1990 United States Senate election in New Jersey, and did result in historic defeats for the Democratic majorities in the 1991 New Jersey General Assembly election and 1991 New Jersey Senate election. And the station has often been credited for playing a role in Florio's failing to be re-elected in the 1993 New Jersey gubernatorial election.

In 2005, the publisher of Talkers Magazine stated that New Jersey 101.5 "is one of the 10 most important talk radio stations in America. That station is a New Jersey treasure."

The political influence of the station has continued. While the hosts of the afternoon drivetime slot changed several times, Gearhart in the morning was a constant for twenty-five years. In 2010, the station named its studio and associated office building as the Jim Gearhart Broadcasting Center. Such was his influence that when the 83-year-old Gearhart had to step down from his morning show in 2015 due to the lingering effects of a fall at home, it was treated as politically significant news. His successor, Bill Spadea, was more of an explicitly conservative political activist. (Gearhart subsequently returned to a podcast role with the station.)

In addition to the opinions of its talk show hosts, the station also has a news division with morning news broadcasts. Indeed, with the decline of newspapers and other forms of local news, by 2017 the station was one of only a small number of media organizations to still have a presence on the press row at the New Jersey State House in Trenton.

The station has been generally considered to criticize Democratic politicians more than Republican ones. Nonetheless it criticized Governor Christie Todd Whitman, who had defeated Florio, when auto insurance rates continued to rise, and as a consequence Whitman stopped appearing on the station. The station's hosts were known for being supporters of Governor Chris Christie, including Christie's move to impose wage freezes upon public school teachers and make them contribute towards some of their benefits. However, this support may have been called into question in the wake of the Bridgegate scandal. In 2018, incoming Governor Phil Murphy decided to end of the monthly call-in appearances on the station that Christie had made.

=== Controversies ===
Craig Carton earned controversy in 2005 when acting New Jersey Governor Richard Codey physically confronted Carton for disparaging remarks that Carton had made about Codey's wife's past battles with postpartum depression.

Carton and partner Ray Rossi were criticized later in the same year for mocking accents and derogatory remarks about Asian Americans in regards to Jun Choi, the 2005 Democratic candidate for Mayor of Edison Township. The station issued an apology.

In 2008, the station's parent company was sued by a photographer for copyright infringement, and defamation with regards to the online posting of a photocopy of a New Jersey Monthly magazine photograph. Photographer Peter Murphy sent a notice of copyright infringement to the station to remove a photo Craig Carton and Ray Rossi, which had been photocopied from a March 2006 issue of the magazine; the station also posted edited versions of the picture that were submitted by listeners. While the station complied with the takedown request, Carton and Rossi complained on-air about Murphy's conduct, allegedly saying that Murphy was "not to be trusted" and that people "should avoid doing business" with him. Carton and Rossi also alleged that Murphy "was a homosexual." In April 2008, Murphy brought suit for direct, contributory, and vicarious copyright infringement, violation of the DMCA, and defamation of character against Millennium Radio Group, Carton, and Rossi. The Third Circuit ruled that the station's actions did constitute both a violation of the DMCA and copyright infringement, which vacated the district court's judgment.

On July 26, 2018, the station came under fire after hosts Judi Franco and Dennis Malloy referred to New Jersey Attorney General Gurbir Grewal as "turban man" while on air. The hosts were suspended for 10 days.

In December 2018, Judi Franco garnered controversy when called the state's "Move Over" law "silly" and unnecessary in an opinion piece she posted on the station's website under the headline "Dead cops make bad laws."

Some of the station's personalities have garnered attention for their promotion of anti-vaccination viewpoints (including opposition to COVID-19 vaccines and COVID-19 vaccine mandates), including morning host Bill Spadea, and host Dennis Malloy of the midday show The Dennis & Judi Show. In September 2022, Spadea and station owner Townsquare Media were sued for defamation by Steven Tobias—a child psychologist who had made appearances on the station to discuss the impact of the pandemic on schools—after Spadea called for him to be "indicted for child abuse" for promoting the wearing of face masks in schools.

=== Notable current staff ===
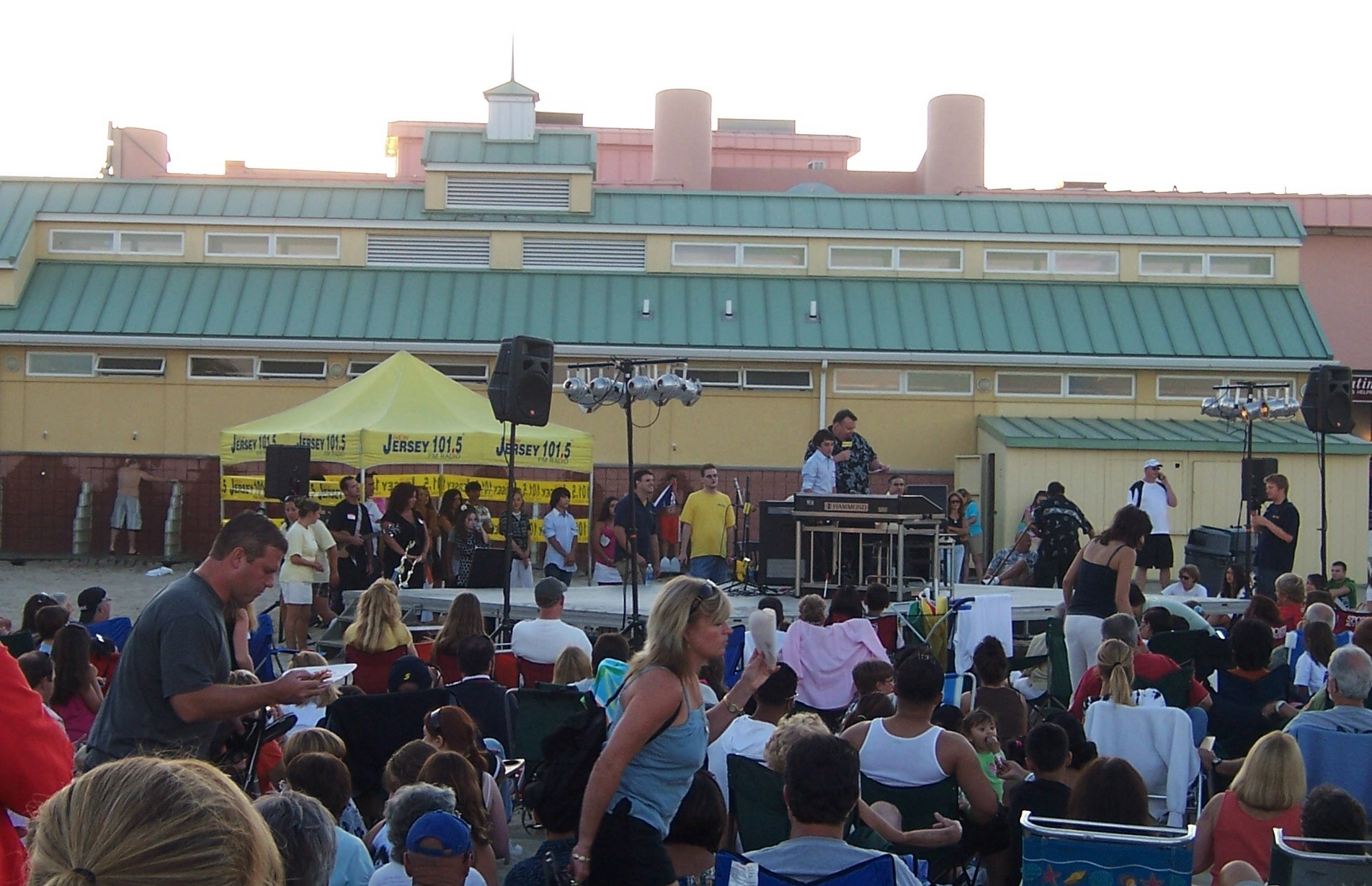
Big Joe Henry hosting his annual Talent Show finals, Point Pleasant Beach, August 2008

- Weekdays morning talk host Bill Spadea since 2014, political commentary and New Jersey-centric topics; candidate for the Republican Party nomination in the 2025 New Jersey gubernatorial election
- Weekends music disc jockey Big Joe Henry since 1997, plays hit songs from the past and tells jokes; named to the New Jersey Hall of Fame in 2026

=== Notable alumni ===
- Craig Carton, former member of The Jersey Guys, later co-host of Boomer and Carton in the Morning at WFAN in New York and CBS Sports Network
- Deminski & Doyle – Jeff Deminski partnered with Bill Doyle on afternoons, 1993–1999; they left to move to WKRK Live 97.1 Free FM in Detroit, Michigan. The pair returned to New Jersey 101.5 in 2011 for the afternoon drivetime show. The duo would continue to occupy the timeslot until 2024, when Doyle's contract was not renewed; Deminski remains.
- John and Ken (John Kobylt and Ken Chiampou, later at KFI Los Angeles)
- Philadelphia radio Hall of Famer Hy Lit and his son Sam Lit, who anchored the air staff in the early 80s
- Ray Rossi, teamed with Craig Carton in afternoons and later heard in evenings

== HD Radio ==
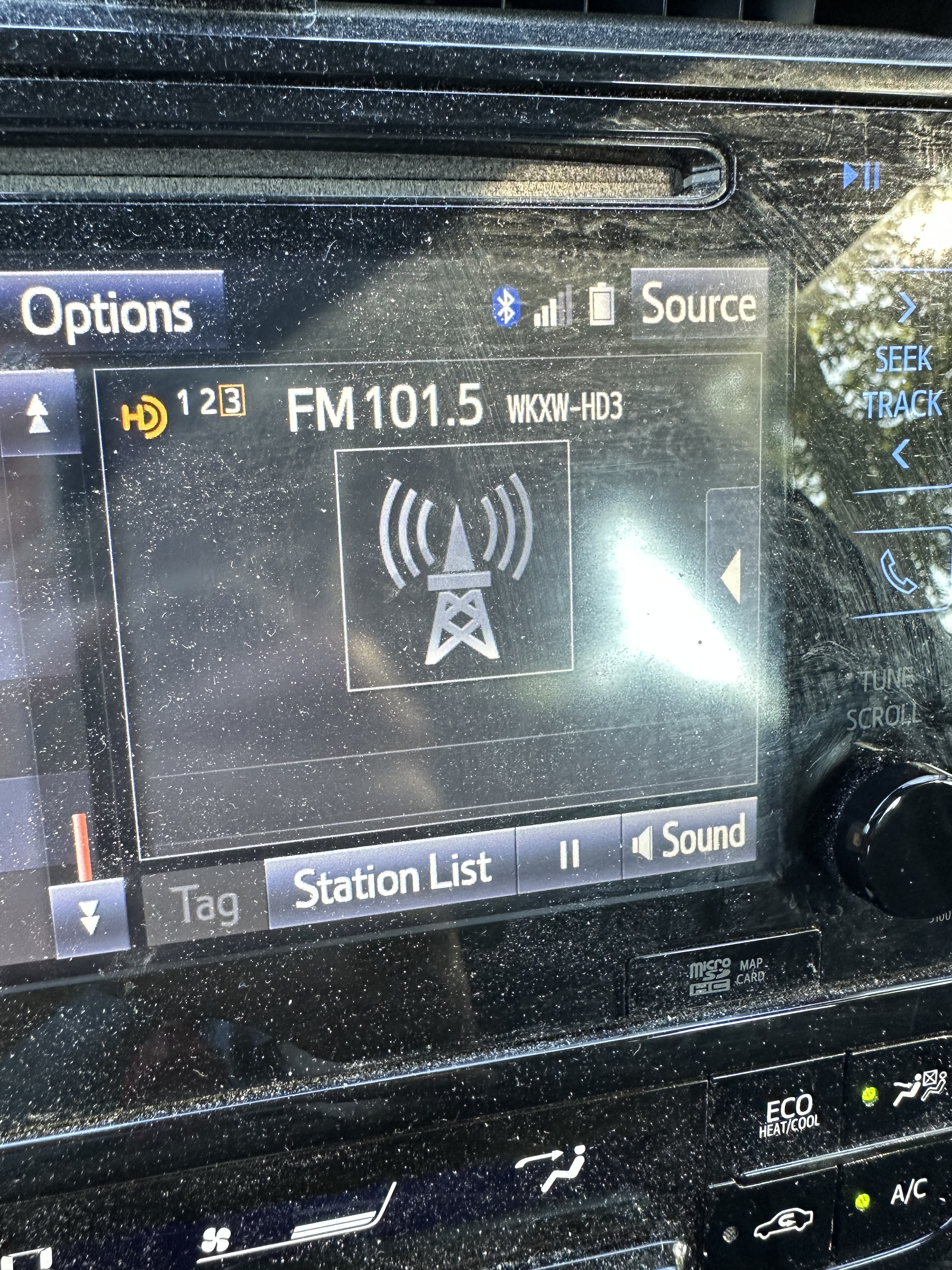
Automobile radio tuned to the WKXW-HD3 subchannel

On May 31, 2024, WKXW launched an oldies format branded "Beach Radio" on its HD2 subchannel.

On the station's HD3 subchannel, the Radio Zindagi franchised network is heard, broadcasting Bollywood music and other South Asian content.
