= Murphy v. Millennium Radio Group LLC =

- Court: United States Court of Appeals for the Third Circuit
- Full case name: Peter Murphy v. Millennium Radio Group LLC, Craig Carton, Ray Rossi
- Argued: January 25 2011
- Decided: June 14 2011
- Citation: 650 F.3d 295

Holding
- The defendants' copying of a magazine picture constituted copyright infringement, and the defendants' removal of the photographer's credit constituted a violation of the DMCA.

Court membership
- Judges sitting: Julio M. Fuentes, Michael Chagares, Louis H. Pollak

Case opinions
- Majority: Julio M. Fuentes, joined by Michael Chagares, Louis H. Pollak

Murphy v. Millennium Radio Group LLC is a 2011 U.S. Third Circuit Court of Appeals case concerning the Digital Millennium Copyright Act (DMCA), copyright infringement, and defamation with regards to the online posting of a photocopy of a magazine photograph. After New Jersey radio station WKXW 101.5 copied onto its website a magazine picture of two of the station's talk show hosts, Craig Carton and Ray Rossi, the photographer of the picture, Peter Murphy, brought a suit against station owner Millennium Radio Group, as well as Carton and Rossi. The Third Circuit ruled that the station's actions did constitute both a violation of the DMCA and copyright infringement, which vacated the district court's judgment.

This case marked the first time a circuit court weighed in on the scope of DMCA §1202, which prohibits the removal of Copyright Management Information (CMI). CMI is a collection of facts about the copyright on a work that is somehow attached to that work. The Third Circuit stated that the statute applied to all CMI, and was not limited to CMI in technological systems.

== Background ==
The March 2006 issue of New Jersey Monthly magazine included a "Best of New Jersey" article, which featured Craig Carton and Ray Rossi as the best shock jocks of the year. The article included a photograph of the two radio hosts, which had been taken by Peter Murphy, an independent contractor for the magazine. Carton and Rossi's radio station, WKXW 101.5, then copied that picture onto its website by scanning the magazine. The photographer's credit, which appeared as fine print in the magazine page's gutter, was cut off from the picture uploaded to the website. In addition, the station encouraged its listeners to submit "photoshopped" versions of the picture. The station also published these listener-modified copies of the picture on its website.

In June 2007, Murphy's attorney sent a notice of copyright infringement to WKXW, demanding that the station stop its infringing activities. WKXW complied with the request, removing the unaltered picture as well as all of the user-modified versions from its website. In response, Carton and Rossi complained on air about Murphy's conduct, allegedly saying that Murphy was "not to be trusted" and that people "should avoid doing business" with him. Carton and Rossi also alleged that Murphy "was a homosexual."

In April 2008, Murphy brought suit for direct, contributory, and vicarious copyright infringement, violation of the DMCA, and defamation of character against Millennium Radio Group, Carton, and Rossi. On March 31, 2010, New Jersey District Court ruled in favor of the radio station on all counts in a summary judgment without oral arguments.

== Opinion of the Court ==
On June 14, 2011, the Third Circuit Court of Appeals reversed the district court's decision, vacating the previous ruling on all counts.

=== Violation of the DMCA ===
Murphy claimed that WKXW's removal of his photographer's credit when copying the picture constituted a violation of the DMCA under 17 U.S.C. §1202(b), which states in part:

No person shall, without the authority of the copyright owner or the law ... intentionally remove or alter any copyright management information ... knowing ... that it will induce, enable, facilitate, or conceal an infringement of any right under this title.

Copyright management information (CMI) is defined in 17 U.S.C. §1202(c), quoted in part as follows:

... the term "copyright management information" means any of the following information conveyed in connection with copies ... of a work, including in digital form ...
(2) The name of, and other identifying information about, the author of a work.

The district court relied on the decision from IQ Group v. Wiesner, which stated that due to the legislative history of the DMCA, CMI should be interpreted as "a component of an automated copyright protection or management system." Using this analysis, the district court concluded that a print credit in a magazine is not CMI under the DMCA, and removing the credit is not a violation of §1202.

The Third Circuit disagreed with the district court's interpretation, holding that the wording of §1202 did not limit its scope to copyright management information only as part of automated systems. As this was the first appellate court to address the scope of CMI in the DMCA, the Third Circuit relied primarily on a plain reading of §1202 to make its decision. The court also addressed the intention of §1202, and found that there was no obvious contradiction between the plain wording and the goal of the legislation. The Third Circuit therefore held that the actions of the radio station and talk show hosts did constitute removal of CMI under the DMCA.

=== Copyright Infringement ===
Murphy alleged direct infringement for the station's use of the unaltered picture, and contributory and vicarious infringement for the user-modified pictures. The defendants claimed that the station's actions qualified as fair use under the Copyright Act.

The district court held that both the user-modified and the unaltered copies of Murphy's picture had transformative purposes from the original, with the former being parody and the latter being news reporting, both of which qualify as fair use. The court also noted that Murphy suffered no adverse economic impact from WKXW's copying, bolstering the fair use defense. The district court therefore found the defendants' use of Murphy's picture to be fair use.

Murphy did not appeal the district court's decision regarding the user-modified images; thus, the Third Circuit analyzed fair use for only the unaltered copy. The Third Circuit, disagreeing with the district court, ruled that WKXW's use of the copy of the photograph had the same purpose as the original: to illustrate Carton and Rossi winning the "best shock jocks" award. Furthermore, while Murphy did not suffer direct economic harm from WKXW's copying, the court noted that widespread manifestations of similar copying would be economically harmful to photographers in general. Consequently, the Third Circuit found that WKXW's use of the unaltered picture was not a fair use.

=== Defamation ===
Regarding Murphy's claims of defamation, the district court, citing precedents, stated:

In determining whether a statement is defamatory, a court 'must consider the content, verifiability, and context of the challenged statements' ... Verifiability refers to whether a statement can be proven true or false, and statements that are not verifiable, such as insults and name-calling, even if offensive, are not defamatory.

Using this analysis, the district court ruled that in the context of Carton and Rossi being shock jocks, their words were merely "rhetorical hyperbole, name-calling or verbal abuse" and did not constitute defamation. The court further held that accusing someone of being a homosexual is not defamatory under any circumstance, since treating an inference of homosexuality as derogatory would "legitimize discrimination of gays and lesbians."

On appeal, the Third Circuit decided that the district court had wrongly granted summary judgment before adequate evidence had been gathered. The radio station had destroyed the recording of the alleged defamatory statements, and Carton and Rossi had not yet been deposed with regards to the defamation claim before the district court issued its decision. The Third Circuit thus vacated and remanded the district court's decision so that Murphy could gather the evidence relevant to the defamation claim.

== Ramifications and Current Status ==
Prior to this decision, only district courts had addressed the scope of §1202, with their decisions differing amongst several interpretations. The narrower interpretations read §1202 in the context of §1201 as well as the overarching purpose of the DMCA, both of which specifically address "technological measures" for copyright protection. The narrower interpretations thus held that non-digital forms of CMI were already covered under the Copyright Act, and therefore were not within the scope of the DMCA. Broader interpretations, upheld by the Third Circuit in this decision, held that §1202 applied to all CMI enumerated in §1202(c), including those unrelated to technology or digitization. Proponents of the broad interpretation argued that §1202 must have a scope beyond purely digital CMI, or the phrase "including in digital form" in the statute would be redundant.

A broad CMI interpretation would allow §1202 to overlap with traditional copyright law, and the defendants' lawyer in this case indicated that this decision "create[d] uncertainty as to ... what triggers liability." The main concern over this overlap is that certain exemptions under the Copyright Act, such as fair use, would still be violations under the DMCA if CMI is removed. A possible mitigating factor to this concern is that §1202 prohibits removal of CMI only when it is done to aid copyright infringement, meaning a §1202 claim should only succeed when actual or potential copyright infringement exists.

As of April 2014, the status of this case remains active and unresolved.
