= WQQW (Connecticut) =

Radio station in Waterbury, Connecticut (1934–1992)

- Waterbury, Connecticut; United States
- Frequency: 1590 kHz

Ownership
- Owner: Comko, Inc.

History
- First air date: November 4, 1934
- Last air date: March 27, 1992
- Former call signs: W1XBS (1934–1936); WBRY (1936–1968); WTBY (1968–1972)
- Former frequencies: 1530 kHz (1934–1941)

Technical information
- Facility ID: 12530
- Power: 5,000 watts
- Transmitter coordinates: 41°35′27.6″N 73°2′34.8″W

WQQW was a radio station on 1590 AM in Waterbury, Connecticut, operating between 1934 and 1992. It began broadcast as one of a handful of "high-fidelity" AM stations in 1934, operating on a double-width channel. It became a normal station in 1941 upon the adoption of the North American Regional Broadcasting Agreement. During this time it changed hands several times. In 1996 it was acquired by the Unity Broadcasting Corporation, owner of WWRL, which surrendered the license.

== History ==
=== A high-fidelity station ===
On December 19, 1933, the Federal Radio Commission authorized three new channels for high-fidelity operation between 1500 and 1600 kHz. (At the time, the AM broadcast band ended at 1500 kHz.) These 20 kHz-wide channels were twice as wide as normal AM channels. Six applications were heard for the channels, and four of them were approved. The application of the Republican-American newspaper group (American-Republican, Inc.) was among these four and was given the experimental call letters W1XBS. Transmissions on 1530 kHz with 1,000 watts began November 4, 1934. The station offered to retune receivers in order to receive 1530 kHz, and within a year, 98 percent of the station's broadcasting area had receivers that could pick up the station. In 1935, W1XBS opened a new New Haven studio facility in the seventh floor of the Liberty Building.

W1XBS was an affiliate of the short-lived American Broadcasting System, later renamed American Broadcasting Company (no relationship to the Blue Network that later became ABC in the 1940s). When this network died on March 26, 1935, W1XBS began taking a new service from the Loew theatre group originating at New York's WHN over the same lines. W1XBS later joined WMCA's Inter-City Network, which had stations from Washington to Boston.

In November 1936, the FCC allowed the four high-fidelity stations to select normal call letters. W1XBS became WBRY that December. As WBRY, the station changed affiliations, first to the Mutual Broadcasting System and then to CBS Radio.

=== Move to 1590 ===
Further changes came in 1941; upon the adoption of the North American Regional Broadcasting Agreement, the high-fidelity stations converted to normal AM operation. WBRY was relocated to 1590 kHz, where it would remain for the next 51 years. The station further upgraded when it began broadcasting during the day with 5,000 watts in 1946. Additionally, the Republican-American demonstrated interest in FM radio, where it held a construction permit for 102.5 MHz that was deleted in 1949 amidst concerns about the business, and television, commenting on a 1953 docket to get a channel allocated to Waterbury. The WBRY Broadcasting Corporation acquired the station in 1958, and it was sold to Crystal-Tone Broadcasting in 1961.

The WBRY call letters changed to WTBY when Lowell Paxson acquired the station in 1968. Four years later, the station was sold to Waterbury Radio and adopted another callsign, one that would be its last: WQQW. In 1982, WQQW flipped from pop music to adult standards as "The Music of Your Life".

=== Comko operation and closure ===
In 1987, The Taft Group, Inc., acquired WQQW, selling it in 1990 to Comko, Ltd. Comko was owned by Richard D. Barbieri, Sr., and John A. Corpaci. However, it did not take long for WQQW's new owners to become embroiled in other controversies. The same year Barbieri bought WQQW, his bank, Security Savings and Loan, became the target of a federal investigation of illegal banking activities in the late 1980s; the resulting corruption investigation led to the conviction of Waterbury mayor Joseph J. Santopietro. Corpaci was a cooperating witness who delivered testimony in three trials. With the owners dealing with other troubles, WQQW's adult standards format went silent on March 27, 1992.

In 1996, the license—still active—was acquired by the Unity Broadcasting Corporation, owner of WWRL 1600 AM in New York City, for $60,000. At the same time, Unity also acquired two other nearby and adjacent-channel stations to its WWRL, WERA in Plainfield, New Jersey, and WLNG on Long Island. All three stations were shut down (in the case of WQQW, the license merely surrendered) to allow WWRL to increase power to 25,000 watts.
