= Sonny Werblin =

American talent agent

- Werblin (left), with Weeb Ewbank and Donald C. Lillis
- Born: March 17, 1910; Flatbush, Brooklyn, New York, United States
- Died: November 21, 1991 (aged 81); Manhattan, New York, United States
- Education: Erasmus Hall High School; James Madison High School; Rutgers University
- Occupations: Entertainment & sports executive/owner
- Known for: New York Jets; Meadowlands Sports Complex
- Spouse: Leah Ray Hubbard
- Children: Robert; Thomas D. Hubbard S. (1945–1991)

David Abraham "Sonny" Werblin (March 17, 1910 – November 21, 1991) was a prominent entertainment industry executive and sports impresario who was an owner of the New York Jets and served as chairman of Madison Square Garden, and who built and managed the Meadowlands Sports Complex.

Werblin was born in Brooklyn, New York. A graduate of Rutgers University, he went to work for Music Corporation of America (MCA) in 1932 and was so successful that in 1951 he was made president of MCA's television division.

At MCA, Werblin made a considerable name at identifying and managing talent. His managed list of major stars were a who's-who in not only music, but also movies and television. During the 1950s and 1960s, Werblin led a production team that developed television shows for all three major networks, an offshoot of his ability to manage the stars that were featured in them. The list of top-rated television shows MCA developed under Werblin, again, is lengthy.

His power as a "star-handler" was such that eventually forces in the entertainment industry combined against him and MCA, resulting in lawsuits in 1962. The company's ability to manage stars would be curtailed greatly under new industry rules after that point. Up to then, he had been known in management circles as "Mr. Show Biz," his power in the industry having been so great.

Werblin left MCA and found a new business vehicle soon after: the American Football League, which he revolutionized. His impact on professional sports is still well-felt today. His MCA connections at NBC (National Broadcasting Company) allowed him to singlehandedly negotiate the AFL's contract there, quickly elevating the league to near-parity with the rival senior NFL, and leading to the development of the Super Bowl as a television event.

The concept of The Sport Star as known today was first largely developed by Werblin, whose first developed "star" was New York Jets quarterback Joe Namath, who became the then-greatest star athlete in America under Werblin's guidance in the mid and late 1960s. It was also Werblin who signed for his Jets, the team he named and colored, football talent scout and coach Wilbur "Weeb" Ewbank. Ewbank quickly developed the Jets into a contender just as he previously had the NFL Baltimore Colts in the 1950s.

In 1938, he married Leah Ray Hubbard (1915–1999) of Norfolk, Virginia. Performing as Leah Ray, she was a well-known vocalist in the Big Band era. Ms. Ray sang with major orchestras such as those of Tommy Dorsey and Phil Harris, and acted in more than a dozen films. Among her film appearances, in 1936 she co-starred with Phil Harris in the Academy Award-nominated short film titled Double or Nothing. While performing with the Phil Harris orchestra she met Sonny Werblin. They married in 1938 and remained together for more than fifty years until his death in 1991.

Werblin died of a heart attack on November 21, 1991, at the age of 81 at Columbia-Presbyterian Medical Center in New York City. He had homes in Manhattan, Miami, Florida and Rumson, New Jersey.

== Sports business ==
In 1963, Sonny Werblin and his partners purchased the American Football League (AFL) Titans of New York from original owner Harry Wismer. Werblin changed the team's name to the Jets, and drafted Matt Snell in the first round, signing him away from the crosstown NFL Giants. His biggest coup came in 1965, when for $427,000 he signed University of Alabama quarterback Joe Namath, who had been drafted by the NFL St. Louis Cardinals. Werblin and the Oakland Raiders' Al Davis resisted the indemnity the NFL demanded, which was $100,000 per year for twenty years. Other AFL owners agreed to the terms, along with stripping the name and logo from the AFL.

Werblin was bought out by Jets management prior to the 1968 season, which concluded with the team winning Super Bowl III over the Baltimore Colts in one of the greatest upsets in sports history. Newark Star-Ledger sports columnists Jerry Izenberg and Sidney Zion would later speculate that, because the Jets fired Werblin, there was a "Curse of Sonny Werblin" on the team. By an unusual coincidence, Werblin and Izenberg were elected to the Sports Hall of Fame of New Jersey in the same year, 1997.

Sonny Werblin built the Meadowlands Sports Complex in East Rutherford, New Jersey which he ran from 1971 to 1977.

When it was announced that the New York Giants would begin playing at the new Giants Stadium in 1976 and a reporter asked Werblin about the New York Giants playing in New Jersey, he explained the geography in the New York City Metro area by saying "If you pave the Hudson River it becomes 13th Avenue." In 1978 Werblin took over as head of Madison Square Garden and its properties, including the New York Rangers and New York Knicks. In 1984, he gave up day-to-day control of Madison Square Garden but remained chairman of its board of directors.

== Thoroughbred racing ==
Sonny and Leah Werblin raced Thoroughbred horses under the nom de course, Elberon Farm. Among their racing successes, their colt, Silent Screen, earned 1969 American Champion Two-Year-Old Colt honors and their filly, Process Shot was the 1968 American Co-Champion Two-Year-Old Filly. In addition, Sonny Werblin was a major shareholder and member of the board of directors of Monmouth Park Racetrack in Oceanport, New Jersey. Of note here is that the first group of four co-owners / investors in The Gotham Football Club ( New York Jets ) were all horse racing associates. All were silent partners in the Jets, deferring to Werblin's ability to handle, press, media and his developed stars.

== Philanthropy ==
Sonny Werblin and his wife established the David and Leah Ray Werblin Foundation which provides financial support for Rutgers University, charitable causes, and cultural activities. Rutgers University built the Sonny Werblin Recreation Center on its Busch Campus, near High Point Solutions Stadium in Piscataway, New Jersey, across the Raritan River from its main campus in New Brunswick. The center is home to weight-training facilities and the university's main venues for water-sports competition.

== See also ==
- American Football League players, coaches and contributors

Sporting positions
Preceded by Harry Wismer	New York Jets principal owner 1963–1968	Succeeded by Leon Hess
