= Jerry Izenberg =

American sports journalist (born 1930)

Jerry Izenberg (born September 10, 1930) is a sports journalist with The Newark Star-Ledger in Newark, New Jersey. He was born in Newark, New Jersey. His career with The Star-Ledger began in 1951 while he was still a student at Rutgers University, Newark, but was interrupted for several years during which he served in the Korean War. Izenberg has covered many memorable sporting events and figures of the late twentieth century, including Sonny Werblin's ownership of the New York Jets, the boxing career of Muhammad Ali, and the Loma Prieta earthquake which interrupted the 1989 World Series.

In addition to many magazine articles and newspaper columns, he has also written 13 books, including Once There Were Giants: The Golden Age of Heavyweight Boxing. Izenberg has been the writer, narrator, or producer (sometimes all three) of 35 network television documentaries. One of those documentaries, A Man Called Lombardi, earned an Emmy nomination.

In 1997, Izenberg was inducted into the Sports Hall of Fame of New Jersey, and in 2000 he won the Red Smith Award from the Associated Press Sports Editors. He was a 2000 inductee of the National Sportscasters and Sportswriters Association Hall of Fame. In 2016, he was inducted into the Boxing Hall of Fame. In 2019, he was inducted into the New Jersey Hall of Fame.

To commemorate 55 years in journalism, Izenberg wrote an eight-part memoir for The Star-Ledger in 2006. He was inducted into the International Jewish Sports Hall of Fame in 2016. Izenberg covered every Super Bowl from Super Bowl I in 1967 through Super Bowl LIII. He declined to attend Super Bowl LIV, bringing an end to his streak.
