= Sports Hall of Fame of New Jersey =

Coordinates: 40°48′42″N 74°4′3″W

The Sports Hall of Fame of New Jersey was established in 1988 to honor athletes, teams, events and contributors associated with the state of New Jersey. There is currently no physical site or structure for the hall, but its members are honored with plaques that are displayed at Meadowlands Arena, in the Meadowlands Sports Complex in East Rutherford.

The first group of members was inducted in May 1993. Inductees are honored in a public ceremony that takes place during New York Giants football games.

== Inductees ==
See footnotes

- Horace Ashenfelter (1998)
- Alvin Attles (1996)
- Rick Barry (1994)
- Bruce Baumgartner (2001)
- Yogi Berra (1993)
- Angelo Bertelli (2000)
- Joe Black (2001)
- Carol Blazejowski (1995)
- Al Blozis (2001)
- Bill Bradley (1993)
- Don Bragg (1999)
- Roosevelt Brown (1994)
- Frank R. Burns (2003)
- Dick Button (1995)
- Milt Campbell (1993)
- Pete Carril (1998)
- Harry Carson (1993)
- Dean Cetrulo (1996)
- Deron Cherry (1996)
- Leonard Coleman, Jr. (1998)
- Roger Cramer (2004)
- Lou Creekmur (1999)
- Wally Dallenbach (2004)
- Stanley Dancer (1995)
- Ray Dandridge (1996)
- Bob Davies (1997)
- Leon Day (1998)
- Al DeRogatis (1995)
- Larry Doby (1993)
- Anne Donovan (1998)
- Sid Dorfman (1998)
- Walter Dukes (2002)
- Lou Duva (2003)
- Althea Gibson (1994)
- John A. Gibson, Sr. (2002)
- Leon Goslin (1999)
- Roosevelt Grier (1997)
- Marvin Hagler (1996)
- Franco Harris (1993)
- Tom Heinsohn (1993)
- Leon Hess (1995)
- Robert Hurley (2000)
- Monte Irvin (1994)
- Jerry Izenberg (1997)
- Ron Johnson (1998)
- Dick Kazmaier (1997)
- Tom Kelly (2002)
- Lou Lamoriello (2002)
- Aubrey C. Lewis (2003)
- Carl Lewis (2001)
- Marty Liquori (1997)
- John Henry Lloyd (1998)
- Vince Lombardi (1993)
- Dick Lynch (2003)
- Wellington Mara (1995)
- George Martin (2004)
- Jack McKeon (2004)
- John McMullen (1996)
- Joe Medwick (1993)
- Debbie Meyer (1999)
- Sam Mills (2003)
- Steve Mizerak (2003)
- Robert E. Mulcahy III (1999)
- Renaldo Nehemiah (1999)
- Don Newcombe (2000)
- Bill Parcells (1997)
- Eulace Peacock (2000)
- Drew Pearson (2001)
- Pelé (1999)
- Johnny Petraglin (2002)
- Willis Reed (2000)
- Richard J. Regan (2001)
- Jim Ringo (1996)
- Phil Rizzuto (1993)
- Paul Robeson (1995)
- Frank B. Saul, Jr. (2004)
- Dave Sime (2004)
- Phil Simms (1999)
- William E. Simon (2004)
- Amos Alonzo Stagg (2001)
- Andy Stanfield (2002)
- David J. Stern (2000)
- Paul J. Tagliabue (2001)
- Lawrence Taylor (2000)
- Joe Theismann (1995)
- Bobby Thomson (2000)
- Frank Tripucka (1999)
- Jersey Joe Walcott (1994)
- Sonny Werblin (1997)
- Peter Westbrook (2002)
- Willie Wilson (2002)
- Alex Wojciechowicz (1995)
- Lonnie Wright (2003)
- George B. Young (2003)
- Elaine Zayak (2004)

== See also ==
- New Jersey Hall of Fame (including sports inductees)
- New Jersey Sports Writers Association Hall of Fame
