= KZDG =

Radio station in San Francisco

- San Francisco, California; United States
- Broadcast area: San Francisco Bay Area
- Frequency: 1550 kHz
- Branding: Radio Zindagi

Programming
- Format: South Asian

Ownership
- Owner: Satish Chandra; (Factorial Broadcasting, LLC)

History
- First air date: March 17, 1947
- Former call signs: KHWA (1946); KSMO (1946–1951); KEAR (1952–1956); KOBY (1956–1960); KQBY (1960–1963); KKHI (1963–1994); KPIX (1994–1997); KYCY (1997–2009); KFRC (2009–2011); KZDG (2011–2018); KGMZ (2018–2022)
- Call sign meaning: "Zindagi"

Technical information
- Licensing authority: FCC
- Facility ID: 25458
- Class: B
- Power: 10,000 watts
- Transmitter coordinates: 37°31′58.8″N 122°16′30.9″W

Links
- Public license information: Public file; LMS
- Webcast: Listen live
- Website: radiozindagi.com/sanfrancisco/

KZDG (1550 AM) is a commercial radio station licensed to San Francisco, California, United States, and serves the San Francisco Bay Area. Owned by Satish Chandra through licensee Factorial Broadcasting, LLC, the station broadcasts a South Asian format as "Radio Zindagi". Its transmitter facilities are located in the nearby suburb of Belmont. In addition to a standard analog transmission, KZDG is available online.

Established in 1947 at San Mateo as KSMO, the station ran into a turbulent history between 1951 and 1961 with a myriad of financial and labor union issues. As KKHI between 1961 and 1994, it and FM adjunct KKHI-FM 95.7 distinguished themselves as the commercial fine art/classical music voice for the Bay Area. Thereafter, the station underwent multiple format changes under subsequent owners Westinghouse Broadcasting, Infinity Broadcasting, CBS Radio, and Entercom (forerunner to Audacy, Inc.), including—as KYCY—becoming the first terrestrial radio station to devote the entire broadcast day to playing podcasts in 2005. Along with being a simulcast of KKHI-FM's successor, sports-formatted KGMZ-FM, the station—as KGMZ—carried Audacy's Channel Q service of LGBTQ-oriented talk and electronic dance from 2019 to 2021.

CBS Radio/Entercom originally leased out the station to Factorial Broadcasting from 2011 to 2018, where it carried a South Asian format under the "Radio Zindagi" name and KZDG calls. This format and call sign returned in January 2022 when Zindagi operator Factorial Broadcasting entered another lease arrangement, ultimately agreeing to purchase the station. Since KZDG's 1947 sign-on, the station's call sign has changed a total of eleven different times.

== History ==
=== KSMO ===
On March 20, 1946, the Federal Communications Commission (FCC) granted Amphlett Printing Company, publisher of The Times newspaper, a construction permit for a new 1,000-watt radio station on 1550 kHz at San Mateo. Initially designated KHWA for the late Horace W. Amphlett, the station went on the air as KSMO on the evening of March 17, 1947. The station was a full-service outlet for listeners in San Mateo, though its musical programming tended toward the classical compared to other local stations. The station was notable for having several staffers that would go on to careers in the market and at later incarnations of the 1550 frequency, including Bob Day, Bill Edwards, Bill Agee, and Doug Pledger.

=== KEAR ===
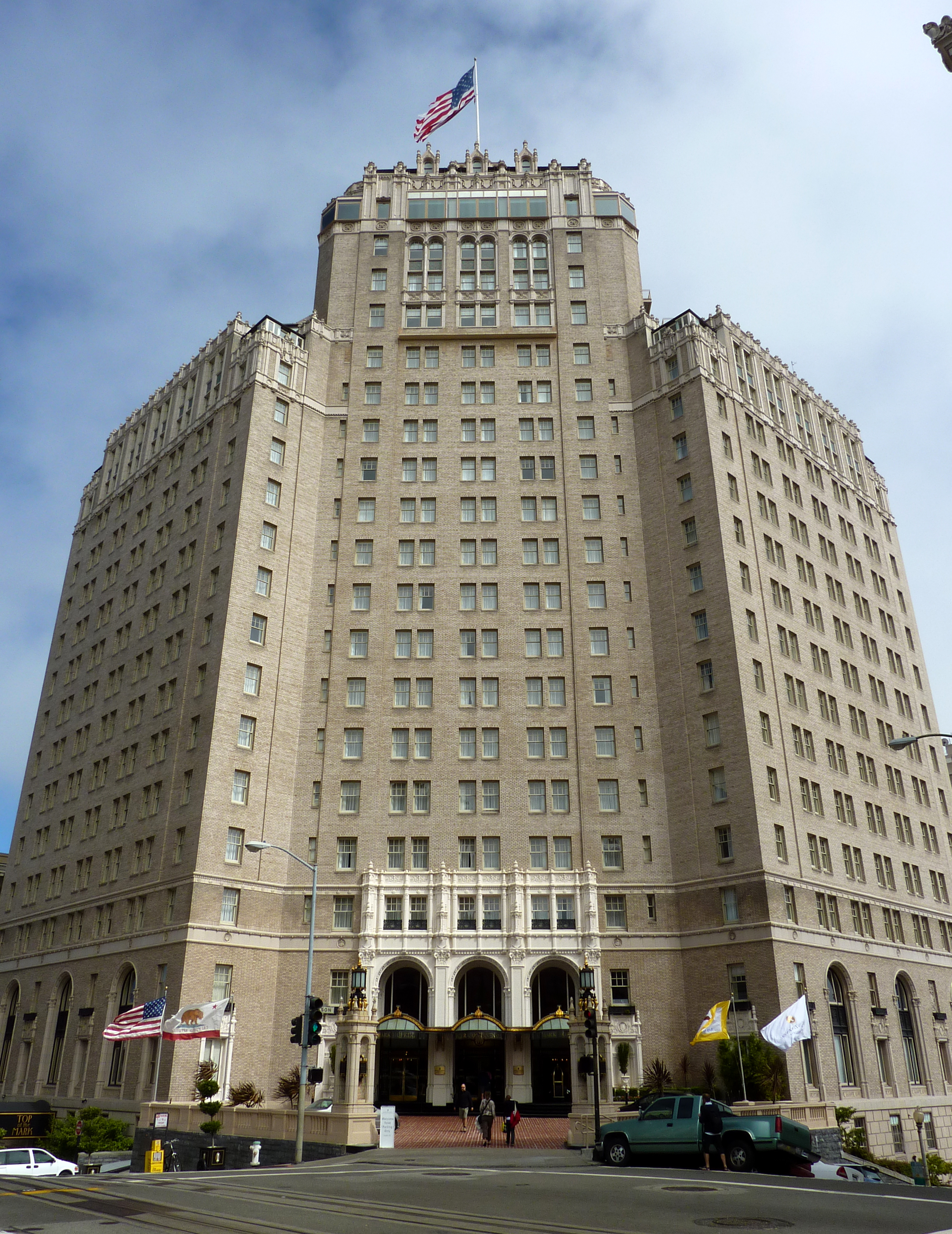
The Mark Hopkins Hotel was KEAR's first studio base in San Francisco proper

After owning the radio station for four years, Amphlett sold KSMO in 1951 to Bay Radio, Inc., owned by Stephen A. Cisler; advertising had evidently been poor on the station. On January 1, 1952, KSMO became KEAR, representing the human ear; Cisler also owned FM station KXKX (97.3 FM), licensed to San Francisco, which would become a simulcast of KEAR.

In 1953, Cisler made radio history when he went on the air to offer listeners a total of 1,000 shares of stock in the station at $50 a share, noting that the station's classical format was unprofitable. Bigger changes were on the way; the FCC granted an application to increase power to a directional 10,000 watts that April. General manager George C. Atkinson, who had been hired away from WQXR in New York City, committed suicide in the final days of 1953 and was discovered days into the new year, evidently having worked long hours to try and get the station to turn a profit. In May 1954, the station activated its upgraded facility and built its first San Francisco studios at the Mark Hopkins Hotel. As Cisler had warned, a broadening of the station's format followed that August; the station that "brought classical music to the Bay Area" had changed its sound for the first time.

The good music came to a halt on October 5 when members of AFTRA and NABET went on strike in search of higher wages, setting up picket lines at the San Francisco and San Mateo studios and the transmitter at Belmont. The station returned to the air after nearly five hours of silence, but the pickets continued, and talks broke down two weeks later. Labor conciliators from the state failed to break the deadlock, prompting the station to sue in December. The strike was not resolved until early 1955.

In February 1955, alongside the resolution of the strike, the FCC authorized KEAR to change its city of license from San Mateo to San Francisco, with the station making its Mark Hopkins Hotel facility its main studio. When a $9,100 tax lien filed by the Internal Revenue Service threatened to force changes, classical music supporters stepped up to raise $27,000 and keep the station in its classical format. However, top names stayed away from the station due to its financial woes.

=== A turbulent demise ===
In 1956, Cisler announced plans to lease the AM frequency to Bartell Broadcasters, which would launch a pop format and rename the station KACE. Cisler would retain ownership of KXKX and change its call letters to KEAR. Under the deal, Bartell would lease the station at $60,000 per year for five years, then buy it for $125,000 at the end of the contract. However, even this arrangement was challenged by other stockholders in Bay Radio, who demanded an accounting of the station's operations under Cisler's management and sought to take over operations themselves to retain the "good music" format; negotiations were even reopened with several potential suitors, including Calvin Smith, president of KFAC, the classical music station in Los Angeles.

Further adding to KEAR's woes, the IRS filed a second tax lien on the station, this one in San Mateo County, which would have allowed a federal seizure of the transmitter facility. The threat became reality on May 31, when IRS agents padlocked the site. KXKX, which Cisler owned through a separate company, was not affected and continued airing its programming.

The federal government announced it would put the station up for auction on June 28. Meanwhile, another group owner with a deep profile in Top 40 radio, Todd Storz, emerged as a potential buyer; however, potentially because of the dispute with stockholders that could have resulted, Cisler rebuffed his overture and stated his intention to put the station on the air again with the help of a "good friend". On June 19, The Times reported that a sale had been agreed to another Midwestern firm, Mid-Continent Broadcasting, headed by David Segal; the report was confirmed the next day, with a lease to take immediate effect. KEAR returned to the air—for the time being, with its prior format—on June 26 after settling its debts.

The tax lien was finally lifted in mid-July, but the specter of more labor trouble moved in to take its place, as a stalemate threatened to develop with NABET. The dispute finally resulted in a strike on September 24, almost eight months after the contract expired; while Cisler hoped to resume broadcasting later the same day, he then opted to keep both stations shut down to prepare to the transfer to Segal.

=== KOBY and KQBY ===
After the new call letters were assigned on September 19, Segal relaunched 1550 as Top 40 outlet KOBY, using an all-new staff. The strike as it pertained to KOBY was resolved in December, with the entire technical staff joining NABET.

The new popular music station was the immediate ratings success that its predecessor was not. At one point, it had an on-air personality who used the name Mike Bradley—after Michael Bradley Segal, the operator's son. However, KOBY's success with the format attracted stronger competitors, particularly KYA, and the station soon lost listeners in an increasingly fragmented format.

Segal sold the station in 1960 to Sherwood Gordon, who also owned stations in San Diego and Phoenix, for $700,000. Gordon announced his plans to install his so-called "Gordon Sound" in San Francisco and restore a good music format. The summer of 1960 also brought with it the launch of a simulcasting FM, briefly KOBY-FM before both stations became KQBY-AM-FM on September 12, coinciding with the launch of what Gordon called "IQ Radio", promising "intelligent programming and quality music". (When competing KABL launched a similar promotion for its station, KQBY sued and won a $12,000 settlement.)

KQBY became an affiliate of the Mutual Broadcasting System in February 1961 and also housed a news bureau, servicing the network's western affiliates after the Mutual newsroom in New York closed down at midnight Eastern Time.

=== KKHI ===
Facing financial difficulties, Gordon "reluctantly" sold the KQBY stations in July 1961 to Frank Atlass of Chicago. Two weeks later, in a short on-air address on the evening of July 16, he announced he was taking the stations silent until the closure of the sale, citing the losses he had made and stating that ratings-focused advertisers would ensure that a good music station would remain unviable in a city like San Francisco. Months later, the United Press International wire service sued Gordon for $1,700 in unpaid fees and to collect the remaining $15,000 of a five-year contract.

The stations were silent between July 16 and October 30, emerging as KKHI-AM-FM with a middle of the road format. The launch had been delayed two weeks due to more trouble with NABET, which occurred when Atlass refused to hire 18 employees that Gordon had dismissed upon taking the station silent.

KKHI, which called itself "the high point on the dial", failed to make an impact. Continued NABET woes—which were not solved until seven employees were reinstated in February—and low ratings led to Atlass offering several commercials for the price of one, which did little to attract interest. Later that year, after firing a dozen staffers due to low revenues, Atlass elected to run KKHI as an all-classical station. It also aired broadcasts of the San Francisco Symphony.

The Buckley-Jaeger Broadcasting Company purchased the KKHI stations for $750,000 in September 1963, stating their intention to retain the format; the FCC approved the transaction in March 1964. The station was competing in a crowded marketplace of classical music stations alongside commercial KBRG (105.3 FM) and KDFC (102.1 FM), distinguishing itself by being an AM-FM simulcast.

That would come under threat with the advent of the FM Non-Duplication Rule, which took effect in 1965 and limited simulcasting by FM stations of co-owned AM outlets to 50 percent of the broadcast day in cities over 100,000. Buckley sought a waiver for the KKHI stations and its WDRC AM and FM pairing in Hartford, Connecticut. In the case of the San Francisco operation, Buckley alleged that splitting the two frequencies would require a one-time $23,000 expenditure on infrastructure and cost $67,000 a year. The stations vigorously fought the new regulation; the FCC ordered them to come into compliance effective August 1, 1967, which was met with a lawsuit in federal appeals court. The rule was upheld in an opinion written by future Chief Justice Warren E. Burger; the stations would eventually get a waiver in 1972, as some other classical operations received similar authorization.

Broadcasts of the San Francisco Opera, hosted by Scott Beach, were added in 1971. In 1973, KKHI made radio history when the stations carried a live concert from Paris, heard in stereo on the FM frequency—the first satellite transmission of a stereo radio program; that same year, the FM broadcast the Symphony in Stereo Quadraphonic sound. The stations received a short-term license renewal in 1975 after protests made over lacking equal employment opportunity practices. By 1988, KKHI was one of two classical music outlets in San Francisco, competing against KDFC for listeners. One air personality, Keith Lockhart, had been at the station for 24 of its first 25 years under Buckley; further, the station secured the music director from KQED-FM when that station dropped its classical programming.

=== KPIX ===
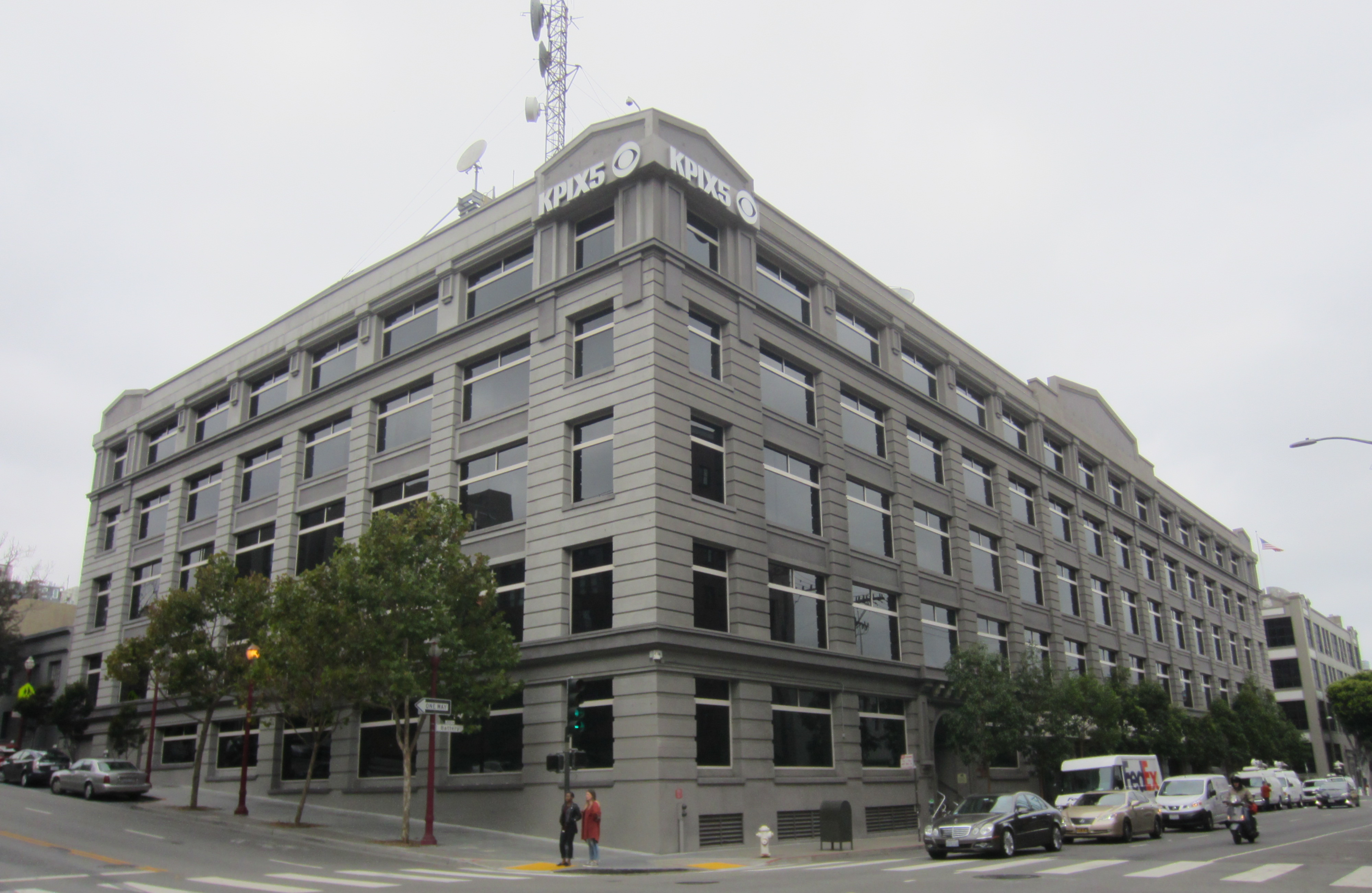
1550 AM broadcast from Grey Rock, which also houses the studios of formerly co-owned KPIX-TV, for much of the period from 1994 to 2022

In November 1993, Buckley announced the sale of KKHI-AM-FM to Group W, the owners of KPIX-TV, for $14.2 million, setting off immediate speculation about a format change. Loyal KKHI listeners decried the sale; later in the year, Saul Levine bought the silent KTID in San Rafael, obtained the KKHI call letters from Group W, and relaunched KKHI on 1510 AM and 100.9 FM.

In July 1994, KKHI-AM-FM became KPIX-AM-FM, a news station during the week but airing jazz music on the weekend. It debuted to low listenership. However, a news event would soon emerge to give KPIX an identity and prompt the region to take notice of the new outlet. The station simulcast the entire O. J. Simpson murder case, vaulting it into the top 10 among Bay Area radio stations and drawing listeners from established KGO. At Grey Rock, the KPIX studios at 855 Battery Street, a new combined newsroom was built to integrate the television and radio news teams. After the trial, the stations shifted to talk with a "very FM sound", which one executive termed "NPR on caffeine".

In 1995, Group W merged with CBS. While the combined holdings of the two companies in San Francisco did not require the divestiture of any radio properties in the market, it did bring KPIX under common ownership with another of its all-news competitors: KCBS. Two years later, CBS traded away KPIX-FM and KLOU in St. Louis to Entercom to receive KITS; Entercom then immediately sold the FM station to Bonneville for $39.6 million, splitting the AM and FM outlets after 37 years.

=== KYCY ===
On May 30, 1997, after KPIX-FM was sold to Bonneville (and flipped to Top 40/CHR), KPIX dropped the news programming and began simulcasting new sister station KYCY and its then-country music format, as well as adopting the KYCY call sign; the AM continued to opt out to air Imus in the Morning.

The two stations continued to simulcast until September 13, 1999, when the AM station switched to a talk format as "Yada Yada Radio 1550", consisting of syndicated shows from hosts Don Imus, G. Gordon Liddy, Tom Leykis, Jim Bohannon, Opie & Anthony, Larry King, Bruce Williams, and "America in the Morning". The talk format performed poorly in the ratings; in the first quarter of 2005, the station failed to show in the market altogether.

=== "KYOU Radio" ===
There's really no risk, 'cause we're taking an AM radio station that basically had no ratings and very little revenue and was not profitable. You know, we said, 'Let's give it a shot.'

— Joel Hollander, CEO of Infinity Broadcasting, on the KYOU Radio experiment

On May 16, 2005, KYCY adopted a unique format that had never been tried on terrestrial radio before: an all-podcast format, branded as "KYOU Radio". (The call letters remained KYCY.) It was the first station to devote its entire broadcast day to user-generated podcasts; the station would not pay contributors. Each user-submitted podcast was screened by the legal department to ensure it met FCC guidelines before approval. Around 20% of the content was speech-based, with the rest based on music. The station was described as a "gamble" by Joel Hollander, president of Infinity Broadcasting Corporation.

Additional programming also began to appear beside the podcasts. In 2006, the Oakland Athletics baseball team—displaced from KFRC (610 AM) by its sale to Family Radio—signed a three-year deal for KYCY and KNTS (1220 AM) in Oakland to be the primary carriers of its radio broadcasts; it was already airing California Golden Bears men's basketball. KNTS was dropped after one season and replaced by KYCY sister station KIFR (106.9 FM).

On May 17, 2007, CBS flipped sister station KIFR from the "Free FM" hot talk format to oldies with call sign KFRC-FM. One month later, three of KIFR's former programs debuted on KYCY, in part to fulfill contractual obligations for hosts like Adam Carolla to be cleared in the San Francisco market. The station was increasingly a collection of disparate programs: an attempted financial talk format, the A's, and audio simulcasts of KPIX-TV's morning news, with the podcasts continuing to air on weekends. It would be nearly 14 years after KYOU Radio's launch before another radio station adopted an all-podcast format: WSAN in Allentown, Pennsylvania, which began airing podcasts affiliated with its owner iHeartMedia in March 2019.

=== Oldies, South Asian "Zindagi", and sports formats ===
Previous logo as "Radio Zindagi" from 2011 to 2018.

CBS Radio flipped KYCY from this mixed spoken-word format to oldies on New Year's Day 2009; additionally, CBS Radio filed to change KYCY's call sign to KFRC (previously used on 610 AM and owned by CBS since 1997). The move occurred following the October 27, 2008 conversion of KFRC-FM from oldies to a simulcast of KCBS, while the format had continued online and on KFRC-FM's second HD subchannel. Unlike KFRC-FM's locally-based iteration of the format, this KFRC was largely programmed via satellite through Citadel Media's "The True Oldies Channel", hosted by Scott Shannon. Meanwhile, the A's moved their radio rights to KTRB, an AM station that had moved to San Francisco from the San Joaquin Valley just two years earlier, for the 2009 season.

KFRC's oldies format ended on September 1, 2011, when the station was taken over by Cinemaya Media under a time-brokerage agreement; the classic hits programming remained online and on KFRC-HD2. Utilizing new KZDG calls, the station adopted a South Asian radio format, focused on Bollywood and Indian American affairs, branded as Radio Zindagi. By 2016, Radio Zindagi was airing on stations in the New York City and Washington, D.C., markets.

On February 2, 2017, CBS Radio announced it would merge with Entercom; the merger was approved on November 9, 2017, and was consummated on November 17. Despite the merger, Cinemaya continued to operate the station via its time brokerage agreement.

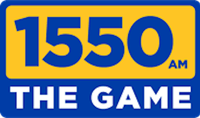
Logo as "1550 The Game"

The time-brokerage agreement ended on May 1, 2018, with Radio Zindagi programming having been moved to KLOK in San Jose (with a simulcast on KITS-HD3); consequently, KZDG became a semi-satellite of 95.7 FM, which had become sports radio station KGMZ-FM, under new KGMZ call letters. The two had been reunited by the CBS-Entercom merger, as Entercom had acquired Bonneville's San Francisco cluster in 2007. While simulcasting KGMZ-FM's programming, KGMZ acted as an overflow outlet for Oakland Athletics play-by-play—whose games had aired on the station since the 2011 Athletics season—in the event of schedule conflicts with Golden State Warriors broadcasts, the latter of which KGMZ-FM had acquired in 2016. This distinction for KGMZ effectively ended following the conclusion of the 2018 Athletics season, when the Athletics voided their contract with Entercom on acrimonious terms and subsequently returned to KTRB via a time-brokered arrangement.

=== Channel Q and return to "Zindagi" ===
KGMZ ended the simulcast with KGMZ-FM on June 3, 2019, when it picked up programming from Channel Q, an LGBTQ talk/dance format established by Entercom in August 2018 for use primarily on HD Radio digital subchannels and Entercom's Radio.com platform. With the switch, KGMZ became the only owned-and-operated network relay for Channel Q on the AM band and was one of two stations that carried the network on their primary signal, the other being KQPS in Palm Desert (KNDD-HD2 in Seattle is also relayed over a low-power FM translator). This change also supplanted the second HD subchannel of KLLC as the San Francisco outlet for Channel Q, which consequently acted as a KGMZ simulcast.

This carriage of Channel Q ended by January 2022, when KGMZ reverted to "Radio Zindagi" under a time brokerage agreement; Audacy (the rebranded Entercom) sold the station on January 16 to Radio Zindagi operator Factorial Broadcasting, LLC, for $495,000. The asset purchase agreement specified that the call sign of the station was to be changed; on January 25, the KZDG call sign returned. The sale was consummated on May 9.

== Transmitter site ==
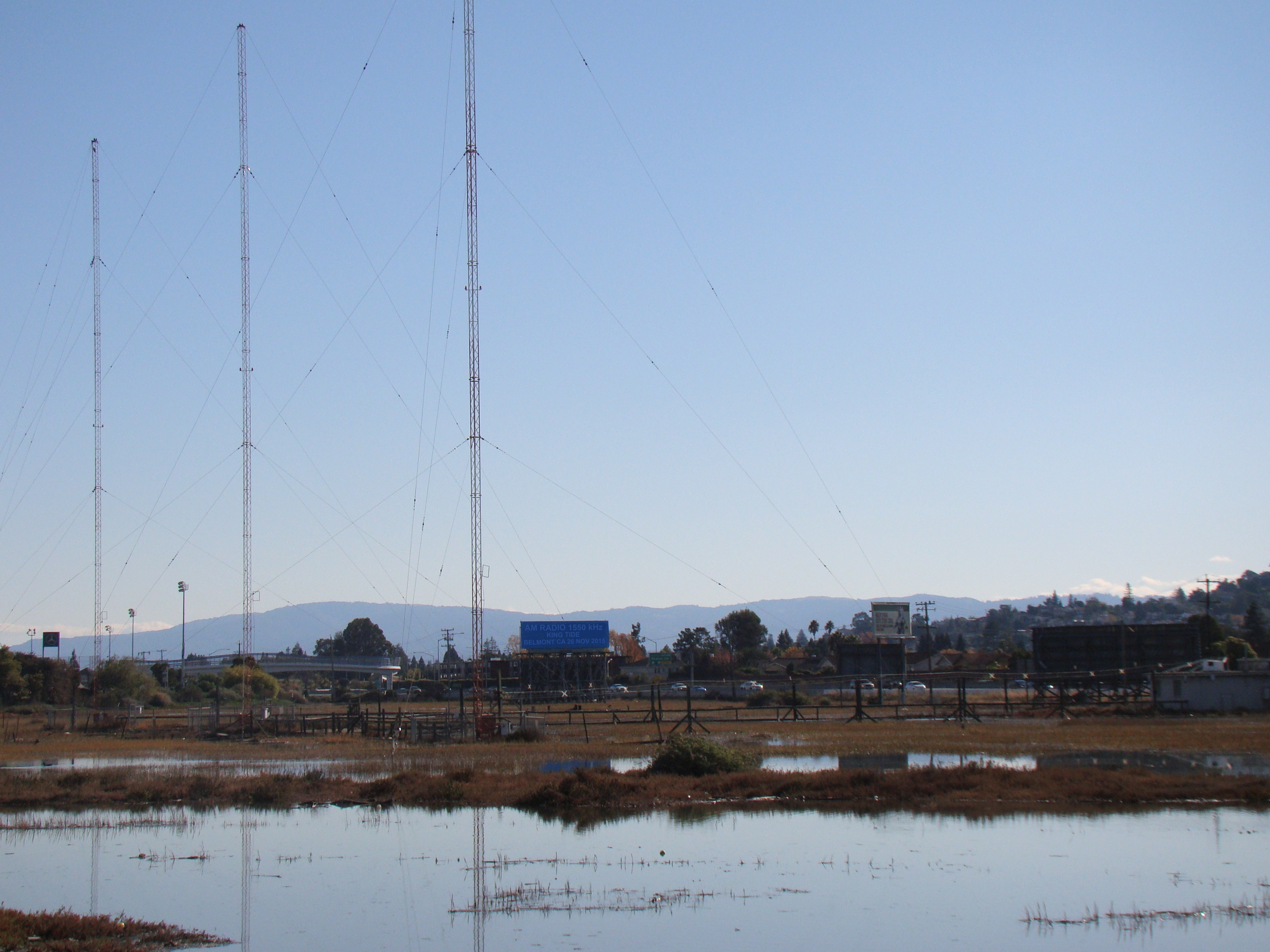
KZDG transmitter site and antennas near U.S. 101 in Belmont

The AM 1550 kHz transmitter site is in the Belmont Wetlands area adjacent to U.S. Route 101. The power level is 10 kW, and the antenna system is a three-tower directional array with a tower height of 46.9 meters located at coordinates 37.533093°N 122.275347°W. The antenna system uses an open-wire five-wire coaxial feedline system, one of the last stations in the United States to use such an arrangement. The three red tower lights were a common nighttime landmark since 1947 along Route 101, but the tower lights are no longer illuminated after the station filed a minor coordinate correction of the tower system in 2013, which allowed it to avoid regulatory lighting requirements otherwise required due to the nearby San Carlos Airport.

The transmitter site is surrounded by O'Neill Slough, which is part of the San Francisco Bay tidal estuary in a spartina cordgrass area and clapper rail habitat. The site has a history of flooding during storms, and in recent years, it is annually flooded during extreme high tide known as the king tide, whenever the level of the San Francisco Bay reaches approximately 9 feet (2.7 m) above mean lower low water datum at the Redwood City tide station.
