= Big Joe Henry =

American radio personality and philanthropist

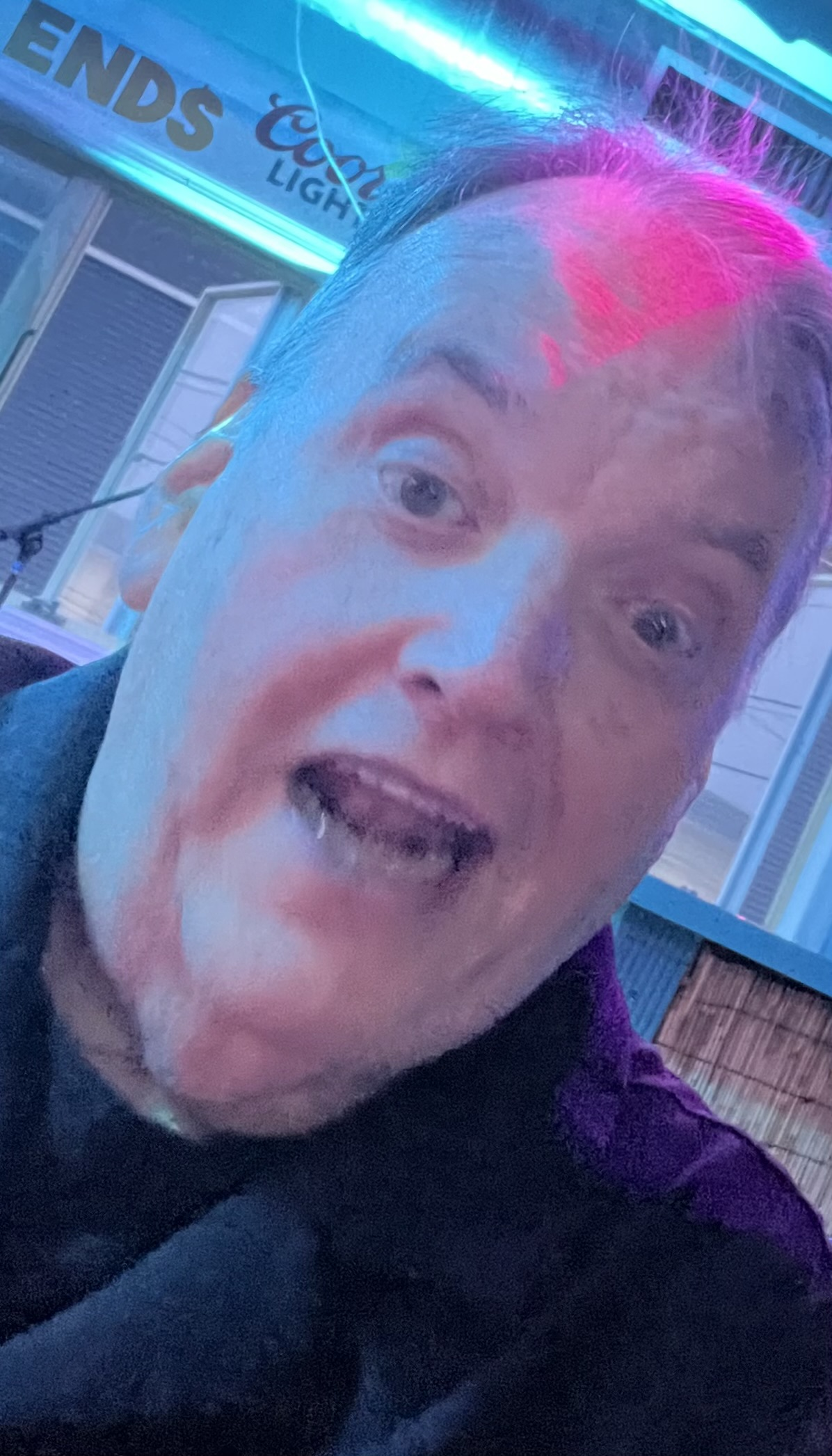
- Big Joe Henry in 2026

Joe Henry (born 20th century), known professionally as Big Joe Henry, is an American radio personality and philanthropist, who is a member of the New Jersey Hall of Fame.

Since 1997, he has hosted weekend music shows on station WKXW New Jersey 101.5, where he tells jokes and plays hit songs from the past. His catchphrase is "Livin' large and lovin' life". Henry is known for his charity work, having made hundreds of personal appearances for various causes and helped to raise tens of millions of dollars for them.

== Early life ==
Henry has said that he was raised in The Bronx, New York, by a single working mother and that they lived with his grandparents, and that he attended high school in Pittsburgh, Pennsylvania.

== Radio career ==
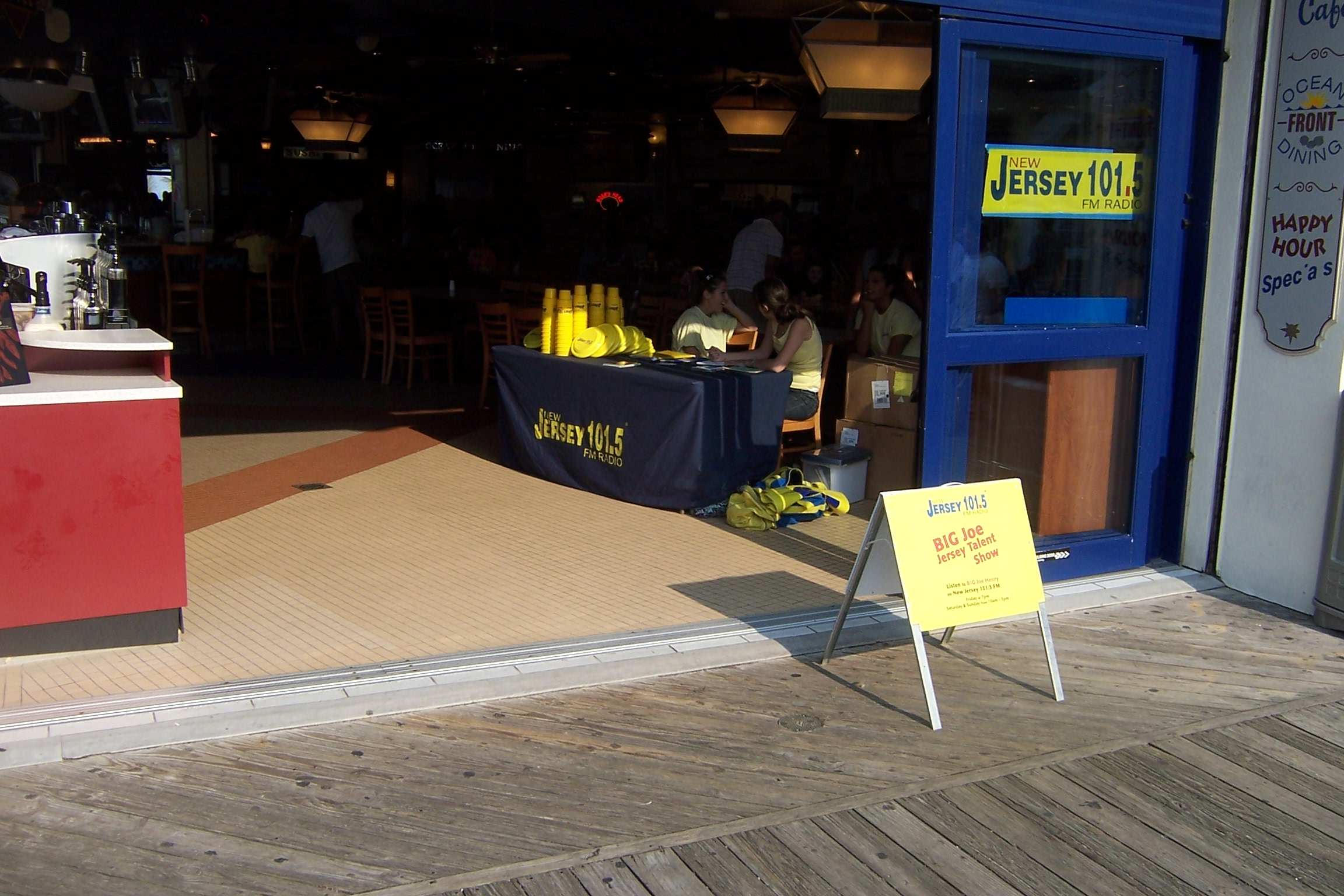
Sign for the Big Joe Jersey Talent Show, along with booth giving out promotional items for New Jersey 101.5

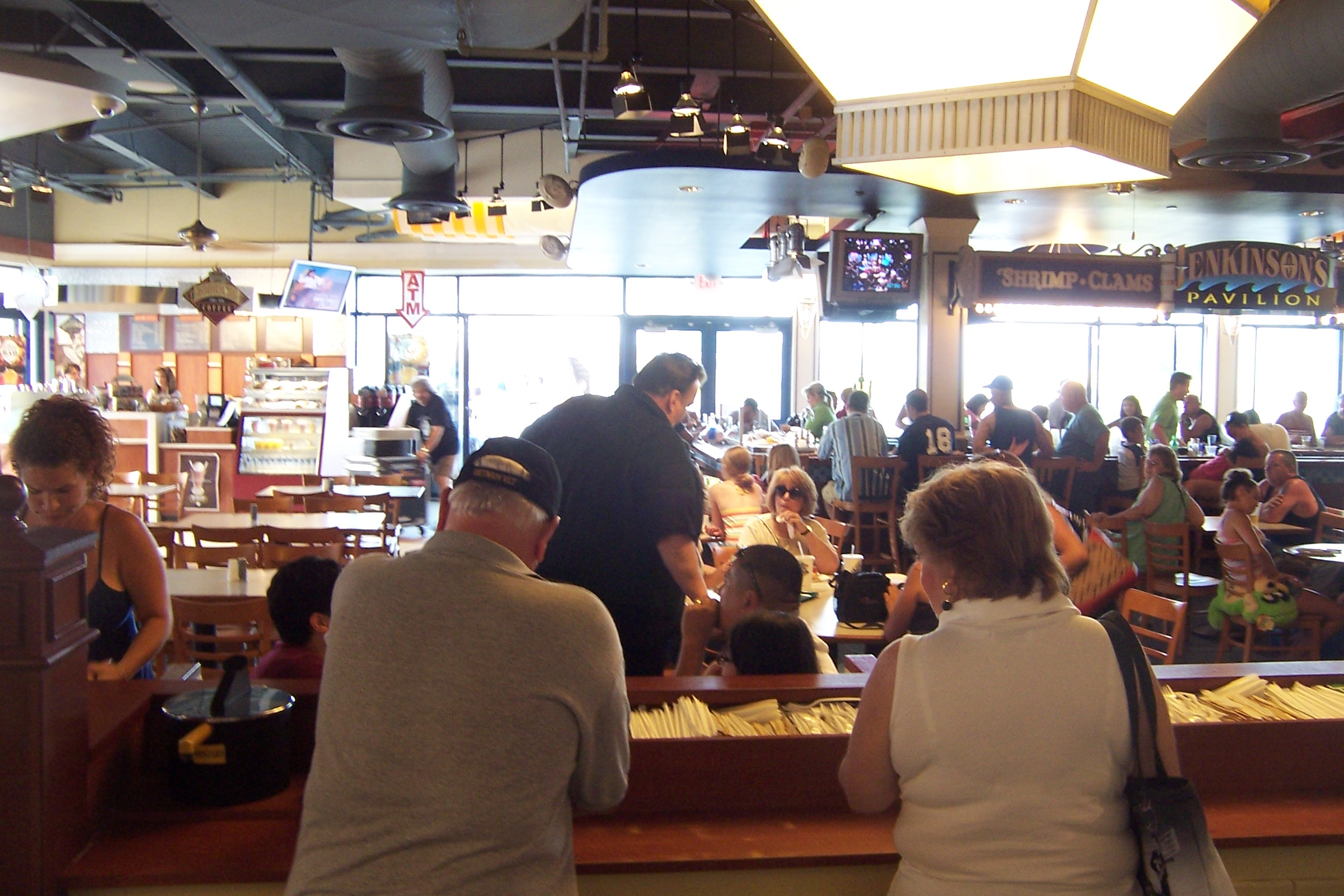
Big Joe Henry (center) talking to diners at Jenkinson's Pavilion

Since 1997, Henry has hosted weekend music shows on WKXW New Jersey 101.5, where he mostly plays hit songs from the 1970s and 1980s. He also tells jokes and introduces traffic reports, in addition to giving the weather and reading advertising copy. He is on Friday nights and Saturday and Sunday middays.

Prior to that, Henry was a disc jockey at WWZY Oldies 107.1 in central New Jersey. Henry had built a large-enough following there that when he moved stations, New Jersey 101.5, took out newspaper advertisements telling listeners where he could now be heard.

Henry is known for his prodigious weight; in publicity materials, he is billed as "America's biggest disc jockey". Many of the jokes told on the show revolve around it, including as an introductory clip where it is said that he is "the only radio personality visible from space". He is also known for his deep voice; one media story about him referred to "the rotund broadcast veteran with the robust baritone".

As part of his work for New Jersey 101.5, Henry on-site hosts The Big Joe Jersey Talent Show, a Sunday-evenings event at Jenkinson's in Point Pleasant Beach, New Jersey, during the summer. Age-grouped contestants are judged by applause until the finals at the end of the summer, when a judging panel is used.

At times, Henry's radio show is broadcast live from remote sites, including a Classic Car Show & Oldies Day at Monmouth Park Racetrack in 2017.

In late 2013 on WFGR in Grand Rapids, Michigan – owned by Townsquare Media which also owns New Jersey 101.5 – a local midday disc jockey was cut from the staff and replaced with a company voice-tracked personality "Big Joe Henry" based in New Jersey.

== Charitable work ==
Henry is known for his frequent work for charities, with hundreds of personal appearances having been made for such causes. Such appearances go back to his days with Oldies 107.1. Beneficiaries of Henry's work have included the March of Dimes and the Special Olympics, the latter featuring the Seaside Heights Polar Bear Plunge. They have also included restauranteur Tim McLoone's Holiday Express organization, for which Henry often dresses as Santa Claus, as well as the New Jersey Army National Guard.

For Hurricane Katrina disaster relief, he led an effort that resulted in 80,000 toys being collected and delivered to the affected Gulf Coast. He has also hosted gala events for the FoodBank of Monmouth and Ocean Counties.

A wintertime fundraising event is Big Joe Henry's Holiday Extravaganza for Jersey Kids, which benefits several different children's charities. It is run by The Rock and Roll Music Fund, an organization that Henry co-founded in 2001. Overall, by 2026, Henry was credited with having helped raise over $70 million for charitable causes in the state of New Jersey. New Jersey musician Bobby Bandiera has said, "Big Joe Henry is a legend on and off the radio."

Although New Jersey 101.5's weekday news and talk format often features hosts displaying conservative or right-wing populist views, the Big Joe Henry weekend music shows are thoroughly non-political. Nonetheless, the two came into conflict in 2010, when the Count Basie Theatre in Red Bank, New Jersey, was presenting awards to high school students in the arts and Henry was scheduled to preside. Some members of the New Jersey Education Association disapproved of his role and threatened to protest the event, saying that Henry worked for a radio station whose hosts often criticized public employees in general and public school teachers and budgets in particular, and that those are the budgets that fund the arts in schools. They also disagreed with those station hosts' support for Governor Chris Christie's push to reduce public school teachers' pay and benefits. The station objected to any attempt to cast Henry as being political, but in the end, after a mediation effort failed and to avoid being a distraction to the students being celebrated, Henry stepped aside as host of the event. The teachers clarified that they did not believe Henry himself was opposed to public education or the arts.

== Other activities ==
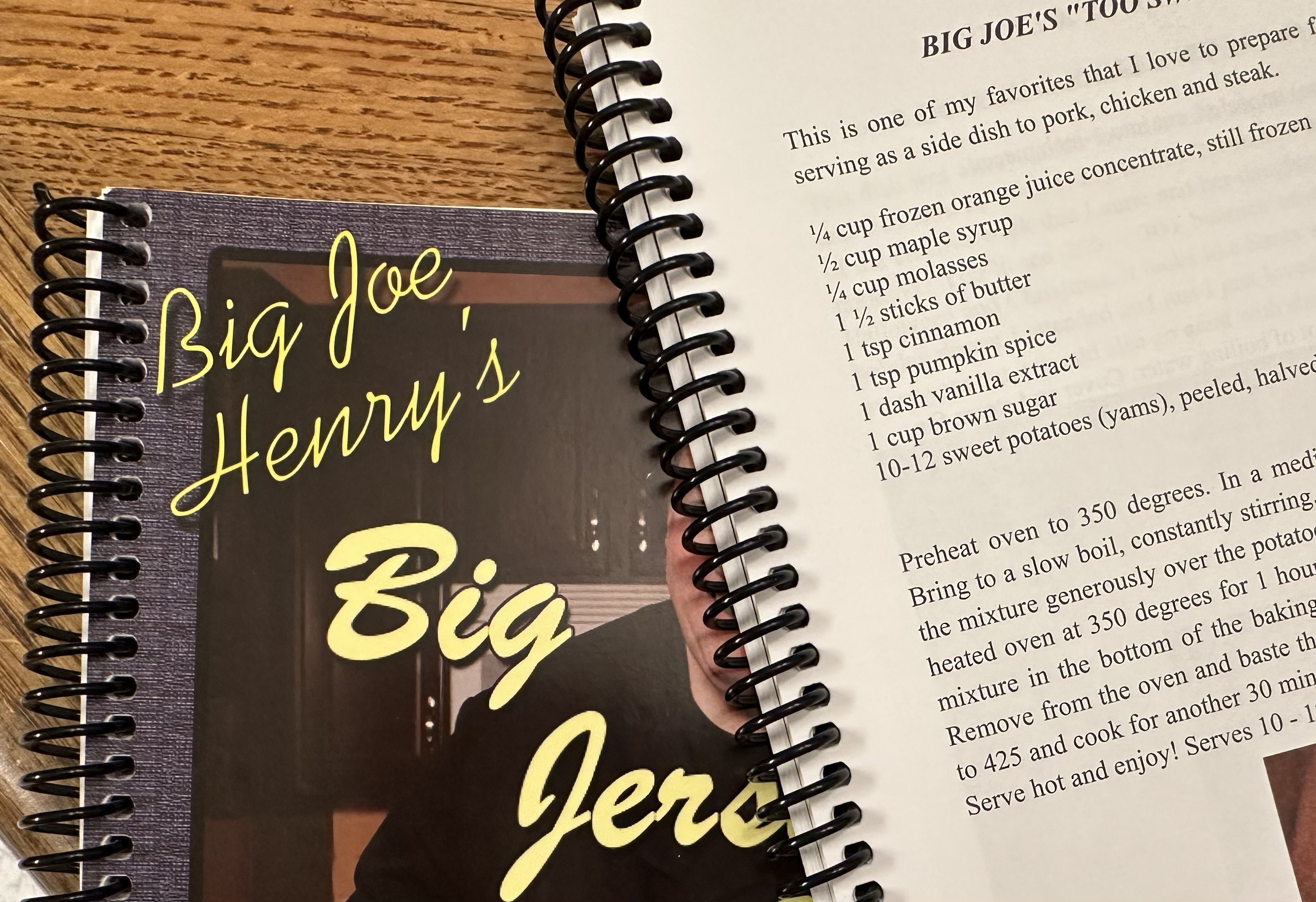
Portions of Big Joe Henry's Big Jersey Cookbook

In 2008, Big Joe Henry's Big Jersey Cookbook: The Ultimate Taste of New Jersey was published. In addition to having his own recipes as well as those from his family and friends, it also had ones selected from submissions by his radio listeners, as well as personal anecdotes from Henry. A substantial portion of the receipts from the book were donated to the FoodBank of Monmouth and Ocean Counties. The cookbook sold out its print run.

Besides charitable activities, Henry has also hosted events, including the Miss New Jersey Teen pageant.

For several years, The Big Joe Henry Variety Show existed as a televised talk show, hosted by Henry and somewhat in the vein of The Ed Sullivan Show; staged at McLoone's Supper Club in Asbury Park, it was viewable on a MeTV affiliate in the Philadelphia and South Jersey region. Subsequent iterations of The Big Joe Henry Variety Show were public events held in Seaside Heights, New Jersey.

Henry has a cameo appearance in the 2020 comedy-drama film This Is the Year.

== Awards and honors ==
Henry was a recipient of the 2006 Humanitarian of the Year honor from the FoodBank of Monmouth and Ocean Counties.

In 2007, Henry was given the Regional Award for Communication Excellence from Monmouth University.

The readers of the Asbury Park Press voted Henry the best radio personality/show in Monmouth County in 2022.

In 2026, Henry was named to the New Jersey Hall of Fame in the Arts & Letters category. The news was given to Henry on-air by Governor Mikie Sherrill, who said to Henry, "You are exactly what New Jersey is all about. Sometimes we get a bad rap for some reason, but we are so community-focused, we care about each other." The induction ceremony is scheduled for September 24, 2026.

== Publications ==
- Big Joe Henry's Big Jersey Cookbook: The Ultimate Taste of New Jersey. New Jersey 101.5 FM Radio. 2008.
