= New Jersey Hall of Fame =

Non-profit honorary organization

Coordinates: 40.814°N 74.078°W

The New Jersey Hall of Fame is an organization that honors individuals from the U.S. state of New Jersey who have made contributions to society and the world beyond.

The Hall of Fame is a designated 501(c)(3) non-profit organization, overseen by a board of trustees. It was statutorily authorized through Public Law 2005, Chapter 232. This bi-partisan legislation was passed unanimously in the New Jersey Senate on May 13, 2005, passed in the Assembly on June 30, 2005, and signed into law by the governor on September 22, 2005.

In June 2013 it introduced a "mobile museum" designed by Michael Graves and Ralph Applebaum which toured the state for more than 300,000 people over three years. In 2017, it opened a satellite exhibition of five holograms, posters and a ″Wall of Fame″ at Newark Airport. In September 2018 it was announced that the Hall of Fame would move to a permanent home at American Dream Meadowlands.

== Format ==
The New Jersey Hall of Fame selects potential nominees in five categories: General, Enterprise, Sports, Arts & Entertainment, and Historical. With only rare exceptions, nominees must have resided in New Jersey for a period of at least five years. Selection of inductees is done using a three-phase process. Phase I is conducted by a group of expert panelists selected by the New Jersey Hall of Fame Board, who compose a list of 20 individuals in each category. Phase II incorporates a group of over 100 prominent organization throughout New Jersey who narrow the field down to 6 individuals in each category. Phase III uses a public voting system via the internet and manual ballots. Upon completion of Phase III, the New Jersey Hall of Fame Board selects its inductees based on the top vote-getter in each category, as well as others the board deems deserving.

== Induction ceremony ==
The first class of inductees was honored in an induction ceremony at the New Jersey Performing Arts Center on May 4, 2008.

== 2008–2010 inductees ==
=== 2008 inductees ===
The inaugural class of inductees for the New Jersey Hall of Fame were announced in a press conference on October 25, 2007, by Governor Jon Corzine.

Historical	Enterprise	Arts & Entertainment	Sports	General
Clara Barton; Thomas Edison; Albert Einstein	Buzz Aldrin; Malcolm Forbes; Robert Wood Johnson II	Frank Sinatra; Bruce Springsteen	Yogi Berra; Bill Bradley; Vince Lombardi	Toni Morrison; Norman Schwarzkopf; Harriet Tubman

=== 2009 inductees ===
The 2009 class of inductees for the New Jersey Hall of Fame were announced on February 2, 2009. The induction ceremony was held May 3, 2009, at the New Jersey Performing Arts Center.

Historical	Enterprise	Arts & Entertainment	Sports	General
Paul Robeson; Walt Whitman	Guglielmo Marconi; Carl Sagan	Bud Abbott & Lou Costello; Jon Bon Jovi; Jerry Lewis	Althea Gibson; Shaquille O'Neal; Phil Rizzuto	F. Scott Fitzgerald; William Carlos Williams

=== 2010 inductees ===
The 2010 class of inductees for the New Jersey Hall of Fame were announced on December 3, 2009. The induction ceremony was held May 2, 2010, at the New Jersey Performing Arts Center in Newark.

Historical	Enterprise	Arts & Entertainment	Sports	General
Alice Paul; Les Paul; Woodrow Wilson	Michael Graves; Wally Schirra	Count Basie; Danny DeVito; Jack Nicholson; Susan Sarandon; Frankie Valli	Larry Doby; Carl Lewis	Judy Blume; William Brennan; Philip Roth

== 2011–2020 inductees ==
=== 2011 Inductees ===
For list of inductees, see footnote

Historical	Enterprise	Arts & Entertainment	Sports	General
John Basilone	Leon Hess	Tony Bennett; Queen Latifah; John "Bucky" Pizzarelli; John Travolta; Bruce Willis	Franco Harris; Joe Theismann	Brendan Byrne; Mary Higgins Clark; William "Bull" Halsey

The 9/11 Victims were also given a special induction.

=== 2012 inductees ===
For a list of inductees, see footnote Ten members of the Class of 2012 were inducted on Saturday, June 9, 2012, during a ceremony at the New Jersey Performing Arts Center: Milt Campbell (Olympian), John Dorrance (condensed-soup inventor), Michael Douglas (actor), Bob Hurley (basketball coach), Wellington Mara (New York Giants owner), Samuel I. Newhouse (media mogul), Annie Oakley (Wild West Show sensation), Joyce Carol Oates (author), Christopher Reeve (late actor-activist), and Sarah Vaughan (jazz singer).

The eleventh member of the Class of 2012 – the E Street Band – will be inducted at a future date. The Unsung Hero Award was given to Eric LeGrand, the paralyzed former Rutgers University defensive tackle.

Historical	Enterprise	Entertainment	Sports	General	Unsung Hero
Samuel Newhouse; Annie Oakley	John Dorrance	E Street Band; Michael Douglas; Christopher Reeve; Sarah Vaughan	Milt Campbell; Bob Hurley; Wellington Mara	Joyce Carol Oates	Eric LeGrand

=== 2013 inductees ===
For a list of inductees, see footnote

Historical	Enterprise	Entertainment	Sports	General	Unsung Hero
Grover Cleveland; Thomas Paine	Bobbi Brown; Raymond G. Chambers; David Sarnoff	Alice Guy-Blaché; Celia Cruz; Whitney Houston; J. Seward Johnson; Joe Piscopo; Dionne Warwick	Joetta Clark Diggs; "Jersey Joe" Walcott	Tom Kean	Kathleen DiChiara

=== 2014 inductees ===
For a list of inductees, see footnote

Arts & Letters	Enterprise	Performance Arts	Public Service	Sports	Unsung Hero
Dorothy Parker; Brian Williams	Howard Katz; Alice Waters	Dizzy Gillespie; James Gandolfini; The Shirelles	James Florio; Peter J. McGuire; Elizabeth Cady Stanton	Patrick Ewing	Maud Dahme

=== 2015 inductees ===
For a list of inductees, see footnote

Arts & Letters	Enterprise	Performing Arts	Public Service	Sports	Unsung Hero
James Fenimore Cooper; Anna Quindlen	William Fox; Lewis Katz; Bernard Marcus	Kool & the Gang; Jon Stewart	Jack H. Jacobs; Frank Lautenberg	Derek Jeter; Christie Pearce; Dick Vitale	Carla Harris

=== 2016 inductees ===
For a list of inductees, see footnote

Arts & Letters	Enterprise	Performing Arts	Public Service	Sports	Unsung Hero
Carol Higgins Clark; Connie Chung	Alfred Koeppe; Arthur Imperatore Sr.	Kelly Ripa; Ray Liotta; Tommy James; Wyclef Jean	Peace Pilgrim; Philip Kearny	Carol Blazejowski; Chuck Wepner	Ed Goldstein; Sue Goldstein

=== 2017 inductees ===
For a list of inductees, see footnote

Arts & Letters	Enterprise	Performing Arts	Public Service	Sports
Harlan Coben	Joe Buckelew; Steve Forbes; Jon F. Hanson; Buddy Valastro	The Four Seasons; Gloria Gaynor; Debbie Harry; Steven Van Zandt	Millicent Fenwick; Mark Kelly; Scott Kelly; Clara Maass	Al Leiter; Carli Lloyd

=== 2018 inductees ===
For a list of inductees, see footnote

Arts & Letters	Enterprise	Performing Arts	Public Service	Sports
Peter Benchley; Jerry Izenberg; George R. R. Martin; Timothy White	J. Fletcher Creamer Sr.; F. M. Kirby II; Tim McLoone; Mary Roebling; Arthur F. Ryan; Martha Stewart	Jason Alexander; Southside Johnny Lyon; The Smithereens	Elizabeth A. Allen; Victor Parsonnet	Harry Carson; Anne Donovan; Laurie Hernandez; Bart Oates

=== 2019–2020 inductees ===
For a list of inductees, see footnote These two years had their inductees jointly awarded.

Arts & Letters	Enterprise	Performing Arts	Public Service	Sports
Charles Addams; Alfred Joyce Kilmer; Stephen Crane; Fran Lebowitz; Mort Pye; Alfred E. Driscoll	Fairleigh Dickinson; Linda Bowden; Steve Kalafer; Borg Family; Joseph Simunovich	Ed Harris; Ernie Kovacs; Emily "Cissy" Houston; Clerow "Flip" Wilson; John Amos; Nelson Family; Danny Aiello	Milton Friedman; Virginia Apgar; Martin Dempsey; Jane Frances Brady	Richard "Rick" Dennis Barry III; Elisha "Eli" Nelson Manning; Gerry Cooney; Robert Mulcahy III; C. Vivian Stringer

== 2021–2030 inductees ==
=== 2021 inductees ===
For a list of inductees, see footnote

Arts & Letters	Enterprise	Performing Arts	Public Service	Sports
Dorothea Lange; Anne Morrow Lindbergh	Madeline McWhinney Dale; Madam Louise Scott; Paul Volcker; Sara Spencer Washington	George Benson; Sarah Dash; Mary Chapin Carpenter	Margaret Bancroft; Alexander Hamilton; David Mixner; William Paterson; Gustave F. Perna; Antonin Scalia	Val Ackerman; Monte Irvin

=== 2022 inductees ===
For a list of inductees, see footnote

Arts & Letters	Enterprise	Performing Arts	Public Service	Sports	Unsung Heroes
Margaret Bourke-White; Walter Dean Myers	The Unanue Family; Dr. Roy Vagelos; Ralph Izzo	Max Weinberg; Chelsea Handler	Gov. Richard J. Hughes; Dorothea Dix	Heather O'Reilly; Ron Jaworski	NJ Medal of Honor Recipients

=== 2023 inductees ===
For a list of inductees, see footnote

Arts & Letters	Enterprise	Performing Arts	Public Service	Sports	Unsung Heroes
Dorothy Porter Wesley; George Segal	Finn Wentworth; Josh S. Weston	David Chase; Tony Orlando; Patti Scialfa	Steve Adubato Sr.; Charles Edison; George Shultz	Tiki Barber; Sue Wicks	Anna Diaz-White; Michael Fux

=== 2024 inductees ===
For a list of inductees, see footnote

Arts & Letters	Education & Science	Enterprise	Performing Arts	Public Service	Sports	Educator of the Year	Unsung Heroes
Gay Talese	Elizabeth Coleman White; John Forbes Nash; Avi Wigderson	George Cooney; Peter Cancro; Donald Katz	Lesley Gore; Warren Littlefield; Paul Rudd; Kevin Smith; Meryl Streep	Father Edwin D. Leahy; Geraldine Livingston Thompson	Dick Button; Tim Howard; Ron Johnson; Phil Simms	Andrew DeNicola	Bob Guarasci; Reva Foster

=== 2025 inductees ===
For a list of inductees, see footnote

Arts & Letters	Education & Science	Enterprise	Performing Arts	Public Service	Sports	Educator of the Year	Unsung Heroes
Dana Bash; Mary Alice Williams	Shirley Ann Jackson	David Burke; Frank Bisignano; Lawrence Inserra, Jr.; Zygi Wilf	David Bryan; Jonas Brothers; Michael Uslan; The Isley Brothers	David T. Wilentz; John P. Keegan; Sheila Oliver; William E. Simon	Hubie Brown; Martin Brodeur; Sydney McLaughlin-Levrone	Drury Thorpe	Dorothea Bongiovi

=== 2026 inductees ===
Arts & Letters	Education & Science	Enterprise	Performing Arts	Public Service	Sports	Unsung Heroes
Big Joe Henry	Geraldine R. Dodge; Thomas M. Eastwick	James E. Burke; Robert C. Garrett; Christopher J. Paladino	The Rascals; SZA	Donald Milford Payne Sr.; Christine Todd Whitman	John J. McMullen; Lawrence Taylor	Tom Weatherall

== See also ==
- Sports Hall of Fame of New Jersey
- Grammy Museum Experience
- List of people from New Jersey
