= Radio Zindagi =

Franchised radio format

Radio Zindagi logo

Radio Zindagi (Hindi: जिंदगी, pronounced "Jindagī", meaning "life") is a franchised radio format that is currently broadcasting in California, New York, and the Washington DC metro area. It began with KZDG in California starting in 2011.

The current affiliates now include:

- KZDG 1550 AM in San Francisco, California
- WBWD 540 AM in Islip, New York
- WXMC 1310 AM in Parsippany-Troy Hills, New Jersey
