= Werewolves Within (film) =

2021 film by Josh Ruben

- Theatrical release poster
- Directed by: Josh Ruben
- Written by: Mishna Wolff
- Based on: Werewolves Within by Red Storm Entertainment
- Produced by: Sam Richardson; Jason Altman; Margaret Boykin; Andrew Lieberman; Natalie Metzger; Matt Miller; Benjamin Wiessner
- Starring: Sam Richardson; Milana Vayntrub; George Basil; Sarah Burns; Michael Chernus; Catherine Curtin; Wayne Duvall; Harvey Guillén; Rebecca Henderson; Cheyenne Jackson; Michaela Watkins; Glenn Fleshler
- Cinematography: Matthew Wise
- Edited by: Brett W. Bachman
- Music by: Anna Drubich
- Production companies: Ubisoft Film & Television; Vanishing Angle
- Distributed by: IFC Films
- Release dates: June 16, 2021 (Tribeca); June 25, 2021 (United States)
- Running time: 97 minutes
- Country: United States
- Language: English
- Budget: $6.5 million
- Box office: $991,898

Werewolves Within is a 2021 American comedy horror film directed by Josh Ruben and written by Mishna Wolff, based on the video game of the same name from Red Storm Entertainment. It stars Sam Richardson, Milana Vayntrub, George Basil, Sarah Burns, Michael Chernus, Catherine Curtin, Wayne Duvall, Harvey Guillén, Rebecca Henderson, Cheyenne Jackson, Michaela Watkins, and Glenn Fleshler. The film follows a group of people in a small Vermont town who get trapped in a snowstorm while suspecting one of them is a werewolf.

Plans for a Werewolves Within film adaptation began in October 2018, with Wolff writing the script and Ubisoft Motion Pictures producing it. The cast was announced in early 2020 and principal photography began in February 2020.

Werewolves Within had its world premiere at the Tribeca Film Festival on June 16, 2021, and began a limited theatrical release in the United States on June 25, 2021, followed by video on demand on July 2, by IFC Films. The film received generally positive reviews from critics for its screenplay, characters, and humor.

== Plot ==
Forest ranger Finn Wheeler is assigned to Beaverfield, a small town where the residents are divided over a pipeline proposed by natural gas businessman Sam Parker. Upon arriving, Finn seeks a room from Jeanine Sherman, owner of the motel/hunting lodge at the social center of village life; Jeanine is politely dismissing Parker's assurances of the pipeline's benefits and happy to meet Finn. Upon getting a room, Finn befriends perky mail carrier Cecily Moore, who lives free at the lodge in exchange for odd jobs. She hands him his mail: a complaint by Dr. Ellis that Emerson Flint is engaged in commercial trapping.

Cecily offers to lead him to his first "case" while she makes her rounds and offers gossip, beginning with the sad story that Jeanine's husband Dave ran off with another woman to Belize. Finn meets the few who live in town: campy lovers Devon and Joaquim Wolfson, whom Cecily describes as an ex-city, nature-loving, millionaire power couple; blue-collar workers Gwen and Marcus, who expect to make money from the pipeline; conservative conspiracy theorist Trisha Anderson and her unfaithful husband Pete, who had a fling with Gwen and constantly hits on Cecily; and reclusive Emerson Flint, who threatens to shoot Finn for trespassing and seems to hold sovereign citizen views.

Their tasks done, Cecily brings Finn to a rec lounge, The Axe Den, where she dances to jukebox songs and chats him up. Finn reciprocates, but stops before kissing her to take a call from his ex-girlfriend Charlotte, and Cecily leaves in disgust. That night, a blizzard knocks out all power in Beaverfield, forcing the residents to take refuge in Sherman's lodge. The power outage occurs right before Trisha's dog is killed by an unknown assailant, which increases tensions. Further conflict arises when Finn discovers that all of Beaverfield's generators were sabotaged and the body of Jeanine's missing husband Dave is underneath the lodge's porch.

The well-armed residents barricade themselves in the lodge for safety, but Pete is yanked out of bed and has his hand bitten off by the same unknown assailant. Zoologist Dr. Jane Ellis, an opponent of the pipeline, concludes that the assailant is a werewolf who is one of the lodge's current inhabitants. After announcing her findings, Dr. Ellis dies in front of Parker under ambiguous circumstances; Parker claims she committed suicide.

Those remaining initially consider staying together in the lodge to force the assailant out of hiding, but there is too much bad blood among them, and ultimately all but Finn and Cecily leave for their homes. Hearing noises from Parker's room, Finn orders Jeanine to hide in her own room and he and Cecily investigate; she sees a newspaper which might implicate Finn as the werewolf, but he finds evidence that Parker sabotaged the generators. In the woods, Devon is struck down; Trisha kills him with a maple syrup tap, telling him she wants the pipeline money. Parker, now armed with his hunting gear, announces his intention to pursue the werewolf. Joaquim, Cecily, and Finn flee him together, then at the Wolfsons' house they find Marcus with knives taped to his fingers; he boasts that he will steal everyone's possessions and pretend a werewolf did it. Cackling, he races outside, where he is hit by his own truck, driven by Gwen, who is then shot by Trish. Trisha, raving crazily, orders them into her house at gunpoint to kill them, then notices Pete has died on the couch. Joaquim kills her with a fireplace poker, the house goes up in flames, and the trio hurry out.

Finn urges them to leave town in Marcus's truck, but Parker stands menacingly in the street. Finn lists Parker's possible motives for killing them: he suspects Cecily; the Wolfsons are blocking his pipeline; and Finn represents legal authority. While he's talking, Joaquim grabs Cecily to kill her due to a superstitious belief indicating that she is a werewolf, but he is then shot by Parker. Nearly all the townsfolk are dead. Finn is attacked by Parker, who accuses Finn of being the werewolf because he worked in locations where previous attacks occurred. Finn counters that there is no werewolf and Parker intentionally caused the paranoia gripping Beaverfield in order to have his proposed pipeline approved. Parker gains the upper hand against Finn, but a dying Joaquim manages to kill him.

Back in The Axe Den, Cecily tells Finn to rest while she gets a first aid kit. However, looking around, Finn finds undelivered packages in the back room and Dave Sherman's name tag. He realizes Cecily is the werewolf who killed Dave, Pete, and Chachi. Confronted by Finn, Cecily acknowledges she turned the residents against each other to make feasting on them easier. She subsequently attempts to kill Finn in her werewolf form, but Finn defeats her with the help of Emerson. Emerson repeats Finn's beliefs about being a good neighbor. Still alive, Cecily makes a final effort to attack Finn and Emerson before Jeanine finishes her off with a crossbow.

== Cast ==
- Sam Richardson as Finn Wheeler, a Ranger in the United States Forest Service
- Milana Vayntrub as Cecily Moore, a friendly postal carrier
- Catherine Curtin as Jeanine Sherman, owner of the lodge; though grateful for any business, she is anti-pipeline.
- Wayne Duvall as Sam Parker, businessman for Midland Gas and a sport hunter
- Cheyenne Jackson as Devon Wolfson, computer tech entrepreneur
- Harvey Guillén as Joaquim Wolfson, yoga entrepreneur, Argentinian-American who nurses superstitions
- Sarah Burns as Gwen, a mechanic; she cheated on Marcus with Pete.
- George Basil as Marcus, Gwen's querulous boyfriend.
- Michaela Watkins as Trisha Anderton, co-owner of Anderton Maple Farms; she wants the pipeline so that she can open a crafts store.
- Michael Chernus as Pete Anderton, co-owner of Anderton Maple Farms; blames the world's ills on "Brooklyn hipsters", Jews, Blacks, and Antifa.
- Glenn Fleshler as Emerson Flint
- Rebecca Henderson as Dr. Jane Ellis, zoologist, veterinarian, environmentalist
- Patrick M. Walsh Jr. as Dave Sherman
- Ritz as Chachi, the Andertons' Papillon dog
- Anni Krueger as Charlotte, Finn's girlfriend, heard only on the phone

== Production ==
In October 2018, it was announced Werewolves Within was being developed as a feature film, with Mishna Wolff set to write the screenplay for the film, while Ubisoft Motion Pictures would produce. Director Josh Ruben joined after his first feature film, Scare Me (2020), attracted the attention of Ubisoft, who provided him with "a V.R. thing to play [the game]", he said. In January 2020, it was announced Sam Richardson had joined the cast of the film and would serve as a producer, with Josh Ruben to direct. In February 2020, Michael Chernus, Michaela Watkins, Cheyenne Jackson, Milana Vayntrub, George Basil, Sarah Burns, Catherine Curtin, Wayne Duvall, Harvey Guillén, and Rebecca Henderson joined the cast of the film.

Principal photography began on February 3, 2020. While the video game is set in a medieval village, the film is set in the modern day and was shot in New York State's Hudson Valley, near the town of Woodstock. Locations included Main Street in Phoenicia, New York, and The Phoenicia Belle bed-and-breakfast, as well as Cooper Lake, and The Golden Notebook bookstore in Woodstock. The historic Fleischmanns Yeast family estate, now the retreat center, Spillian, in Fleischmanns, New York, served as the Beaverfield Inn, and as production headquarters.

Ruben said the film's low budget prevented it from being able to afford to license the U.S. Postal Service logo, resulting in cast-member Milana Vayntrub playing a postal worker for the "'National Mail Service' or something." He also explained that the cast's wardrobe was deliberately exaggerated: "I wanted the wardrobes to look like they might get turned into action figures. Someday, someone may want to dress up as these characters for Halloween."

== Release ==
After IFC Films acquired distribution rights to the film, Werewolves Within had its world premiere at the Tribeca Film Festival in June 2021. The film received a limited theatrical release in the United States on June 25, 2021, followed by video on demand on July 2, 2021.

== Reception ==
=== Box office ===
The film grossed $575,783 in the United States and Canada, and $416,115 in other territories, for a worldwide total of $991,898.

In North America, Werewolves Within opened in 270 theaters in its opening weekend and grossed $250,811. In its second weekend it made $115,250 from 209 theaters; it was also the most-rented film on the iTunes Store's independent, horror, and comedy charts.

=== Critical response ===
On the review aggregator website Rotten Tomatoes, the film holds an approval rating of 86% based on 148 reviews, with an average rating of 6.9/10. The website's critics consensus reads, "Werewolves Within is the rare horror comedy that offers equal helpings of either genre – and adds up to a whole lot of fun in the bargain." Metacritic, which uses a weighted average, assigned the film a score of 66 out of 100, based on 17 critic reviews, indicating "generally favorable" reviews.

Tomris Laffley of Variety said that "despite all the severed, bloody body parts ... Werewolves Within is more playfully thrilling than scary in tone" and that the screenwriter "fashions all her characters with memorable attributes and plenty of social observations, yielding a compelling range of suspects none of which you can write off entirely." Calling the film "Clue with werewolves", A.A. Dowd of The A.V. Club gave the film a B− grade, saying that Ruben's "sensibilities shine lunar bright through the way the film privileges collisions of personality in contained spaces over creature-feature thrills." Jennifer Ouellette of Ars Technica wrote, "Werewolves Within is first and foremost a successful comedy, and the ridiculously talented cast members all possess the skills and onscreen ensemble chemistry to make the script come alive." The Guardian's Leslie Felperin gave it 4 out of 5 stars, calling it a "goofy horror comedy" and saying it "just goes to prove that if you have a great cast, smart direction and witty script you can just about get away with murder."

Noel Murray of the Los Angeles Times called it "[b]oth funny and snappy," and that its "catchy concept is made even more entertaining by a cast of accomplished comic actors." However, he also said there was "an overall lack of urgency or danger, related to the comedic tone. Because the characters are a bit silly, it's hard to become too invested in whether or not they get disemboweled." The Age's Jake Wilson gave it 2.5 out of 5 stars, calling it "a film that wants to please and to some extent succeeds in doing so, without ever being very funny or very alarming." The New York Times' Lena Wilson wrote, "Werewolves Within could interrogate sexism, classism or America's increasingly divided politics, among other things. Instead, this overstuffed script drips with blink-and-you'll-miss-them jokes that lampoon everything and challenge nothing, least of all monstrosity itself."

In a review of Werewolves Within in Black Gate, Sue Granquist said "why do I think Werewolves Within is worthy? First of all, its origin story is kind of cool." The film ranks on Rotten Tomatoes' Best Horror Movies of 2021.

== Awards and nominations ==
Award	Year	Category	Recipient	Result	Ref.
Critics Choice Super Awards	2022	CCA Super Award Best Actor in a Horror Movie	Sam Richardson	Nominated	
Fangoria Chainsaw Awards	2022	Chainsaw Award Best Limited Release Film	Josh Ruben	Nominated	
Hollywood Critics Association Midseason Awards	2021	HCA Award Best Indie Film	Josh Ruben	Won	
Las Vegas Film Critics Society Awards	2021	Sierra Award Best Horror/Sci-Fi Film	Josh Ruben	Nominated	

== See also ==
- List of films based on video games
