= Josh Ruben =

American actor and director (born 1983)

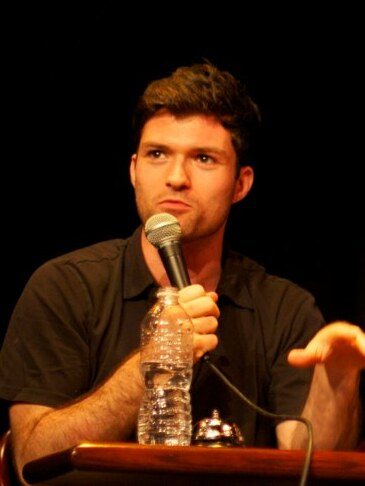
- Ruben in 2012
- Born: Joshua Benjamin Ruben; June 30, 1983 (age 43); Washington, D.C., U.S.
- Occupations: Actor; comedian; director; producer
- Relatives: Rachael Yamagata (half-sister)
- Website: joshsmindhouse.com

Joshua Benjamin Ruben (born June 30, 1983) is an American actor, comedian, director, and producer. He formerly worked for CollegeHumor and continues to appear in Dropout original shows.

He has directed the horror films Scare Me, Werewolves Within, and Heart Eyes.

== Early life and education ==
Ruben was born in Washington, D.C. He grew up in Woodstock, New York, with two half-siblings, one of whom is the singer-songwriter Rachael Yamagata. He acted in youth theatre and aspired to become a comic actor.

He graduated from Onteora High School in 2001. He worked at a gas station before being accepted into the New Actors Workshop in New York City at age 19.

== Career ==
Unable to get an agent in his first years in New York City, Ruben worked as a film extra and at Best Buy. With childhood friend Sam Reich and others, he formed the comedy group Dutch West, which made sketch comedy videos for the internet. Thanks to his work with the group, CollegeHumor hired him as a staffer, and he wrote and directed hundreds of its "Originals" short videos. He has appeared on the Dropout game show Game Changer and its spinoff Make Some Noise, both hosted by Reich, and is credited as an executive producer on the latter series.

Ruben moved to Los Angeles in 2016. He drew from his CollegeHumor 401(k) to write, produce, and direct Scare Me, a comedy horror film shot at Cooper Lake outside of Woodstock. Starring Ruben as an aspiring writer staying in a cabin in the woods, it premiered at the 2020 Sundance Film Festival. His next film, Werewolves Within, based on the video game, was also shot in the area in the Hudson Valley. It premiered to critical acclaim at the Tribeca Festival in June 2021. He directed Heart Eyes, a romantic comedy slasher film. He is set to direct the sci-fi horror film Green Bank as well as the horror film Wilderness Reform.

== Personal life ==
Ruben is married to writer and director Lauren Sick, who served as second unit director on his film Heart Eyes. Their house in Altadena burned down in the 2025 Eaton Fire shortly before they planned to move in.

== Filmography ==
=== Feature film ===
Year	Title	Director	Writer	Producer	Actor	Notes
2020	Scare Me	Yes	Yes	Yes	Yes	
2021	Werewolves Within	Yes	No	No	No	
2021	Are You Happy Now	No	No	No	Yes	
2022	A Wounded Fawn	No	No	No	Yes	
2025	Heart Eyes	Yes	No	No	Yes	cameo
TBA	Green Bank	Yes	No	No	No	Post-production

=== Short film ===
Year	Title	Director	Writer	Producer	Actor	Notes
2015	Zoolander Returns to the Runway	Yes	No	No	No	Co-directed with Vincent Peone
2016	Tond	Yes	No	No	No	Co-directed with Vincent Peone
2017	Freddy Derryl	Yes	Yes	Yes	Yes	
2017	Cabin	No	Yes	Yes	No	

=== Television ===
Year	Title	Director	Writer	Producer	Actor	Notes
2009–2013	CollegeHumor	Yes	Yes	No	Yes	Directed 48 episodes; Wrote 22 episodes
2012–2013	Hardly Working	Yes	Yes	No	Yes	Directed episode "Fire Warden"; Wrote 4 episodes
2013	Remix the Movies	Yes	No	No	Yes	7 episodes
2014	That Couple You Know	Yes	No	Yes	Yes	
2014	Step 9	Yes	No	No	No	3 episodes
2014	GQ Originals	Yes	No	No	No	Episode "Adam Drive Meets His Man Crush"
2015	Adam Ruins Everything	Yes	No	No	No	3 episodes
2016	Boondoggle	Yes	No	No	No	Episodes "Pilot Error" and "The Course"
2021	Death to 2021	Yes	No	No	No	Co-directed with Jack Clough
2024	Die Hart	Yes	No	No	No	7 episodes
2024	The Creep Tapes	No	No	No	Yes	Episode "Brad"
