= Samrat Chakrabarti =

Actor

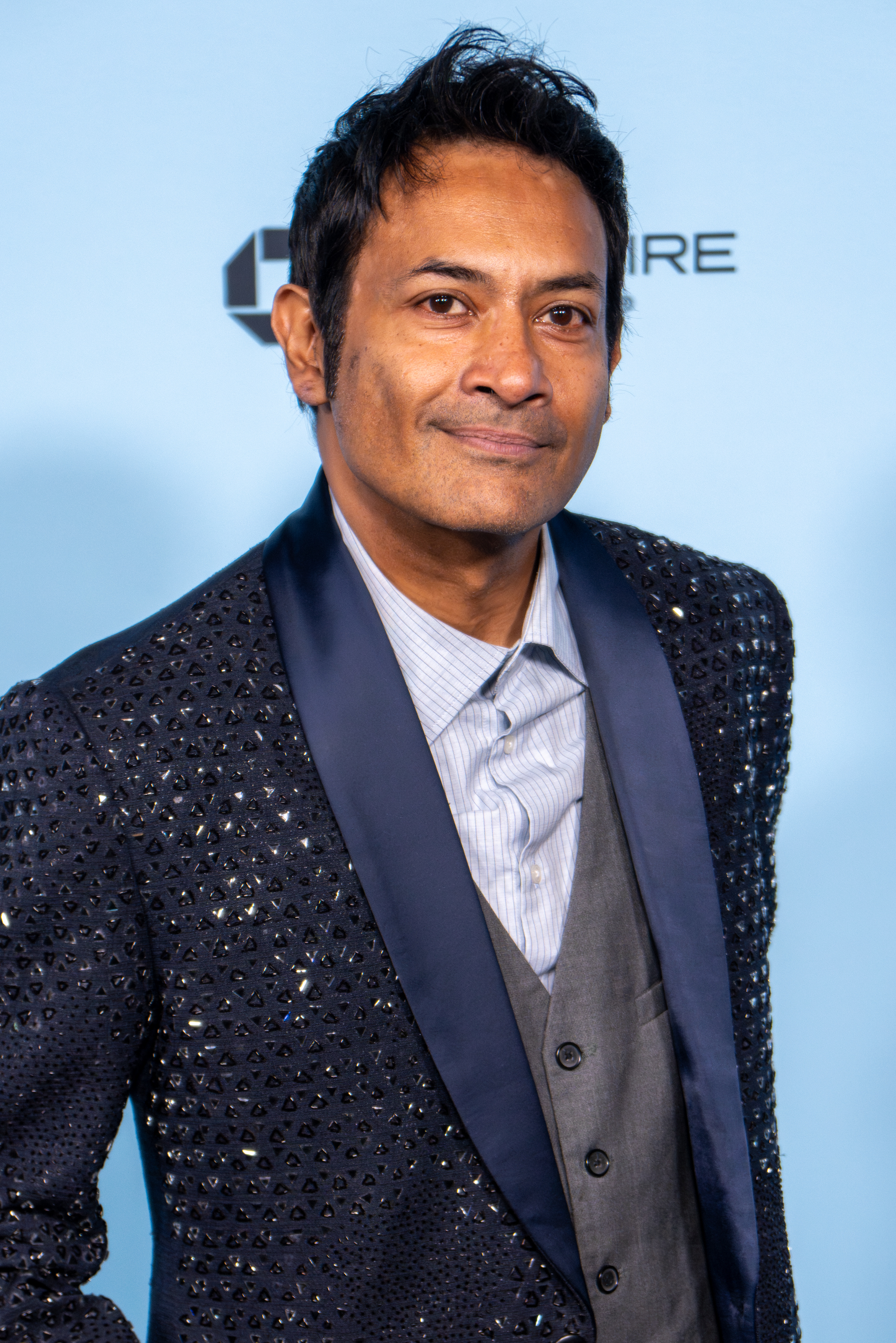
- Chakrabarti at the 2025 Sundance Film Festival
- Born: London, England
- Education: Brandeis University (BA); Harvard University (MFA)
- Occupations: Actor, musician
- Years active: 2003–present

Samrat Chakrabarti is a British-American film actor and musician of Indian descent.

He holds a Master of Fine Arts degree from the Institute for Advanced Theater Training at Harvard University.

== Career ==
=== Acting ===
Chakrabarti appeared in the 2004 Spike Lee film She Hate Me as well as such films as Manish Acharya's Loins of Punjab Presents, Bombay Summer, starring Tannishtha Chatterjee and Stray Dolls.

Chakrabarti has also appeared in television productions, including Rescue Me with Denis Leary, Conviction, Law & Order, The Sopranos and FX's Damages.

In 2025, he attended the world premiere of his zombie film Didn't Die at the 2025 Sundance Film Festival.

=== Music ===
Samrat Chakrabarti is also an established international musician. In 1994, he founded Brandeis University's award-winning all male a cappella group, VoiceMale, for which he continues to contribute arrangements and original compositions, including "Please Don't Go," which appears on the album Suit Up and arrangements for the national a cappella compilation Voices Only 2009. He won a U.S. CARA for Best Original Pop/Rock Song for his composition "What's It all About."

He is a former member of the a cappella group Five O' Clock Shadow. He was also a part of the group The Hyannis Sound. In 1998, Chakrabarti produced an untitled album for his musical group, JYDE, and composed the song "Startving."

He wrote the music and co-wrote the book and lyrics for the 2012 musical Bumbug the Musical.

Chakrabarti has also composed the theme song "Dhol Beat" for Loins of Punjab, and Sundaram Tagore's Natvar Bhavsar: Poetics of Color.

== Filmography ==
Year	Title	Role	Notes
2003	Arya	Raj Singh	
2004	She Hate Me	Ahmad	
2005	The War Within	Pakistani Interrogator	
2005	Homecoming	Ben	
2006	The Bong Connection	Rakesh	Bengali film
2007	Loins of Punjab Presents	Trance Sen	
2007	Karma Calling	Rohit Rao	
2007	Kissing Cousins	Amir	
2009	Homecoming	Ben	
2009	Bombay Summer	Jaidev	
2010	Ashes	Rishi	
2010	Gangor	Ujan	
2011	Desperate Endeavors	Adesh	Short film
2012	Midnight's Children	Wee Willie Winkie	
2012	Price Check	Eddie	
2013	Vishwaroopam	Deepak Chatterjee	Tamil film
2013	Vishwaroop	Deepak Chatterjee	Hindi film
2014	The Ladies of the House	Derek	
2014	Unfreedom	Anees	
2015	Beyond the Mask	Basil	
2016	Wiener-Dog	Dr. Farhard Rahman	
2017	Viceroy's House	Moshin	
2018	The Kindergarten Teacher	Sanjay Roy	
2018	Nancy	Raj	
2018	Vishwaroopam 2	Deepak Chatterjee	Tamil film
2018	Vishwaroop 2	Deepak Chatterjee	Hindi film
2019	Stray Dolls	Sal	
2020	I'll Meet You There	Dr. Sahil Khan	
2021	Leylak	Abdul	Short film
2025	Didn't Die	Hari	

== Television roles ==
Year	Title	Role	Notes
2004	The Sopranos (HBO)	Dr. Onkar Singh	Episode: "Marco Polo"
2004	Law & Order (NBC)	Hydar Raheem	Episode: "Enemy"
2004	Hope and Faith (ABC)	DJ	Episode: "Jack's Back"
2006	Love Monkey (CBS)	Engineer	Episode: "Opportunity Knocks"
2007	Law & Order: Criminal Intent (NBC)	Tariq Amir	Episode: "World's Fair"
2008	All My Children (ABC)	Saad Pertiwi	Episode: #1.10018
2009	Damages (FX)	Manu Singh	Episodes: "They Had to Tweeze That Out of My Kidney" and "New York Sucks"
2009	Celebrity Ghost Stories (The Biography Channel)	Pharmacist	(TV Series documentary)
2010	Bored to Death (HBO)	Akhil	Episode: "Forty-Two Down!"
2010	In Treatment (HBO)	Arun Sanyal	Episode: "Sunil: Week One"
2010	30 Rock (NBC)	Ramesh	Episode: "College"
2013	The Carrie Diaries (The CW)	Doc	Episode: "I Heard a Rumor"
2013	Blue Bloods (CBS)	Parmar Hameed	Episode: "Mistaken Identity"
2014	Law & Order: Special Victims Unit (NBC)	Mr. Salim	Episode: "Criminal Stories"
2015	Mr. Robot (USA Network)	Rohit "Ron" Mehta	Episode: eps1.0_hellofriend.mov
2016	NCIS: New Orleans (CBS)	Jenner Blye	Episode: "Sister City: Part 1"
2016	NCIS (CBS)	Jenner Blye	Episode: "Sister City: Part 2"
2017	Bull (CBS)	Sean Laheri	Episode: "What's Your Number?"
2017	The Problem with Apu (TruTV)	Himself	Documentary
2020	Homeland (Showtime)	Ambassador Rashad	Episode: "Designated Driver"
2020	Little Voice (Apple TV+)	Anil	5 episodes
2021	Bull (CBS)	Jai	Episode: "The Boy Who Cried Murder"

== Videogames ==
Year	Title	Role
2005	SOCOM 3 U.S. Navy SEALs	Additional South Asia AO voices
2005	Grand Theft Auto: Liberty City Stories	—N/a
2005	SOCOM U.S. Navy SEALs: Fireteam Bravo	Additional South Asia AO voices
2013	Grand Theft Auto V	The Local Population
2014	Far Cry 4	Additional voices
