= Ubisoft Film & Television =

Film and television production company

- Formerly: Ubisoft Motion Pictures (2011–2019)
- Type: Subsidiary
- Industry: Filmed entertainment
- Founded: 2011; 15 years ago
- Headquarters: Montreuil, France; Los Angeles, United States
- Key people: Gérard Guillemot (CEO); Hélène Juguet (Managing Director, French branch)
- Parent: Ubisoft
- Website: ubisoft.com/en-us/entertainment/film-tv

Ubisoft Film & Television (formerly known as Ubisoft Motion Pictures) is a French-American film and television production company and a subsidiary of video game publisher Ubisoft based in Montreuil and Los Angeles. The company was founded in 2011, and is in charge of producing films and television shows based on Ubisoft franchises and inspired by Ubisoft's worlds and video game culture.

== History ==
Ubisoft Film & Television was established as Ubisoft Motion Pictures in 2011 as the film production branch of the video game company Ubisoft. Its mission is to bring Ubisoft's games into new areas of entertainment and share original stories set in the world, culture, and community of gaming.

In 2012 and 2013, Ubisoft Film & Television announced a lineup of movie adaptations, including Assassin's Creed. The studio released its first television series, Rabbids Invasion in 2013. The show, which premiered on Nickelodeon and France 3, was renewed for a second season in December 2013 and a third one in 2015. A fourth season was announced in July 2018 and was broadcast on Netflix worldwide.

Following the success of Rabbids Invasion, Ubisoft Film & Television and the French theme park Futuroscope opened the Raving Rabbids–based attraction The Time Machine in December 2013. The attraction, which has been awarded the Themed Entertainment Association Award for "Outstanding Achievement" in 2014, takes visitors for a trip through the great moments in History.

The company's first feature film, Assassin's Creed, opened in theaters in 2016 and starred Michael Fassbender and Marion Cotillard. The same year, GameSpot reported that Ubisoft was in talks with Netflix for a television series based on their video games.

Tom Clancy's The Division is in development as a feature film for Netflix with David Leitch, Jake Gyllenhaal, and Jessica Chastain attached. Additional feature films that were announced in development include Just Dance, Rabbids, and Tom Clancy's Ghost Recon.

The studio has expanded its television series lineup. Several animated projects were announced in September 2019, and a first live-action television series Mythic Quest was launched on Apple TV+. This project is also the first not to be attached to any Ubisoft game franchise. The series, which stars an ensemble cast that includes Rob McElhenney and Charlotte Nicdao, has been renewed for a second season.

In June 2021, Netflix announced that they had picked up Captain Laserhawk: A Blood Dragon Remix from Adi Shankar as well as Splinter Cell: Deathwatch and a Far Cry animated series.

== Films ==
=== Released ===
Title	Director(s)	Release date	Franchise	Co-producers	Distributor(s)
Assassin's Creed	Justin Kurzel	21 December 2016	Assassin's Creed	New Regency; DMC Film; The Kennedy/Marshall Company	20th Century Fox
Werewolves Within	Josh Ruben	25 June 2021	Werewolves Within	Vanishing Angle	IFC Films

==== Reception ====
Film	Critical		Budget	Gross
Film	Rotten Tomatoes	Metacritic	Budget	Gross
Assassin's Creed	19%	36	$130 million	$240.7 million
Werewolves Within	86%	66	$6.5 million	$991,828

=== Upcoming ===
Title	Director(s)	Release date	Franchise	Co-producers	Distributor(s)
Watch Dogs	Mathieu Turi	TBA	Watch Dogs	Regency Enterprises	TBA

=== In development ===
Title	Director(s)	Franchise	Co-producers	Distributor(s)	Ref(s)
Beyond Good & Evil	Rob Letterman	Beyond Good & Evil	TBA	Netflix	
Just Dance	TBA	Just Dance	Screen Gems; Olive Bridge Entertainment	Sony Pictures Releasing	
Rabbids	Todd Strauss-Schulson	Rabbids	Mandeville Films; Stoopid Buddy Stoodios	Lionsgate	
Riders Republic	Adil El Arbi; Bilall Fallah	Riders Republic	Gaumont	TBA	
Tom Clancy's The Division	Rawson Marshall Thurber	Tom Clancy's The Division	Nine Stories Productions; Freckle Films; 87North Productions	Netflix	
Tom Clancy's Ghost Recon	Michael Bay	Tom Clancy's Ghost Recon	Platinum Dunes	Warner Bros. Pictures	
Tom Clancy's Splinter Cell	Doug Liman	Tom Clancy's Splinter Cell	New Regency; Bay Films	Warner Bros. Pictures	

== Television series ==
=== Released ===
Title	Release date		Franchise/Inspired by	Co-producers	Network(s)
Title	Premiere date	End date	Franchise/Inspired by	Co-producers	Network(s)
Rabbids Invasion	3 August 2013	26 December 2018	Rabbids	TeamTO; Anima; France Télévisions	France 3 (France); Nickelodeon (U.S.); Netflix (Worldwide)
Mythic Quest	7 February 2020	26 March 2025	Mythic Quest	RCG Productions; 3 Arts Entertainment; Lionsgate Television	Apple TV+
Captain Laserhawk: A Blood Dragon Remix	19 October 2023		Far Cry 3: Blood Dragon; Various other Ubisoft IPs	Bobbypills; Bootleg Universe	Netflix
Side Quest	26 March 2025		Mythic Quest	RCG Productions; 3 Arts Entertainment; Lionsgate Television	Apple TV+
Splinter Cell: Deathwatch	14 October 2025	present	Tom Clancy's Splinter Cell	Tradecraft; Sun Creature Studio; FOST Studio	Netflix

==== Specials ====
Title	Release date	Franchise/Inspired by	Co-producers	Network(s)
Mythic Quest: Quarantine	22 May 2020	Mythic Quest	RCG Productions; 3 Arts Entertainment; Lionsgate Television	Apple TV+
Mythic Quest: Everlight	16 April 2021	Mythic Quest	RCG Productions; 3 Arts Entertainment; Lionsgate Television	Apple TV+
Rabbids Invasion: Mission to Mars	29 September 2021	Rabbids	TeamTO; Anima; France Télévisions	France 3 (France); Netflix (Worldwide)

==== Shorts ====
Title	Release date	Franchise/Inspired by	Co-producers	Network(s)
Rabbids Short Stories	13 November 2019	Rabbids	Various animation studios	YouTube

=== Upcoming ===
Title	Franchise/Inspired by	Co-producers	Network(s)	Ref(s)
Assassin's Creed	Assassin's Creed	TBA	Netflix	
Far Cry	Far Cry	More Better Productions; 26 Keys Productions; 3 Arts Entertainment; FX Productions	FX	

=== In development ===
Title	Franchise/Inspired by	Co-producers	Network(s)	Ref(s)
Starpets	Rabbids	TBA	TBA	
Skull & Bones	Skull and Bones	Atlas Entertainment	Netflix	
