= Laura Goode =

American novelist and screenwriter

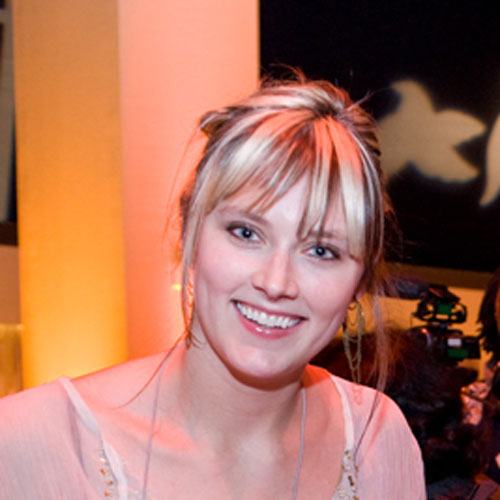
- Born: November 25, 1983 (age 42); Edina, Minnesota, U.S.
- Education: Edina High School; Columbia College (BA); Columbia University School of the Arts (MFA)
- Occupations: Author; screenwriter; poet
- Writing career
- Notable works: Sister Mischief, Farah Goes Bang, Become a Name, Pitch Craft
- Website: www.lauragoode.com

Laura Goode (born November 25, 1983) is an American author, essayist, poet, screenwriter, producer, and feminist. She currently serves as associate director for Student Programs for the Public Humanities Initiative at Stanford University, where she teaches in the English department and Feminist, Gender, and Sexuality Studies program. She is the author of the young adult novel Sister Mischief and the poetry collection Become a Name, and the co-writer and producer of the feature film Farah Goes Bang. Her nonfiction craft book, Pitch Craft: The Writer's Guide to Getting Agented, Published, and Paid, is forthcoming in fall 2025. In December 2024, she launched the newsletter Re/Definitions. She lives in San Francisco, California.

== Early life and education ==
Goode was raised in Edina, Minnesota, a suburb of Minneapolis–Saint Paul which provided the inspiration for Sister Mischief's fictional setting of Holyhill, Minnesota. From 1995 to 1998, Goode competed in Minnesota's regional and state spelling bees. She graduated from Edina High School in 2002, received her B.A. in English and Comparative Literature from Columbia College, Columbia University in 2006, and received her M.F.A. in Writing from Columbia's School of the Arts in 2008.

== Career ==
=== Literary work ===
Laura Goode's debut young adult novel, Sister Mischief, was published by Candlewick Press in 2011. The novel follows Esme, a Jewish lesbian teenager who forms a hip-hop group with her friends in the fictional town of Holyhill, Minnesota. Goode has cited her "love for young people" and her "frustration with the lack of strong literary role models for young women of all different cultural backgrounds and sexual identities" as motivations for writing the book. Sister Mischief was a 2012 Best of the Bay pick by the San Francisco Bay Guardian, a top 10 selection of the American Library Association's Rainbow List for excellence in GLBTQ YA literature, and a selection of the ALA's Amelia Bloomer List for excellence in feminist YA literature.

Goode's essays, poems, and short fiction have appeared in numerous publications, including ELLE, BuzzFeed, Refinery29, New Republic, New York Magazine, the Los Angeles Review of Books, Glamour, InStyle, and Publishers Weekly.

Her collection of poems Become A Name was released by Fathom Books in October 2016.

Her nonfiction craft book Pitch Craft: The Writer's Guide to Getting Agented, Published, and Paid is forthcoming from Ten Speed Press, a division of Penguin Random House, in fall 2025.

=== Film ===
While an undergraduate at Columbia, Goode met and became friends with Meera Menon, who starred in a play Goode wrote. Later, Goode and Menon co-wrote the feature film Farah Goes Bang, which Menon directed and Goode produced. Farah Goes Bang premiered at the 2013 Tribeca Film Festival, where it was awarded the inaugural $25,000 Nora Ephron Prize by Tribeca and Vogue. Farah Goes Bang also won the Comcast Narrative Competition at CAAMFest. Goode designed and executed a Kickstarter campaign for the movie, which raised $81,160 for production of the film. Farah Goes Bang's distribution was facilitated by Seed&Spark and released at retail in April 2015.

=== Academic and public humanities work ===
Since 2019, Goode has served as associate director for Student Programs at the Public Humanities Initiative at Stanford University. In this role, she helped launch the flagship speaker series What Is a Public Intellectual Today, which has featured authors such as Jia Tolentino, Tressie McMillan Cottom, Alexander Chee, Anne Helen Petersen, Wesley Morris, and Maggie Nelson.

Goode is also the co-host of The Feminist Present, a podcast produced with Adrian Daub and supported by the Michelle R. Clayman Institute for Gender Research. Guests have included Judith Butler, Angela Garbes, Melissa Febos, Jeanette Winterson, Merve Emre, Susan Stryker, Evette Dionne, and Cheryl Strayed.

From 2017 to 2023, Goode served on the board of directors for San Francisco Women Against Rape, a long-standing organization recognized for its rape crisis services and commitment to women of color leadership.

== Personal life ==
Goode was previously married and finalized her divorce in August 2024. She has two sons.

== Works ==
- Sister Mischief (young adult novel, 2011)
- Farah Goes Bang (screenplay, 2013)
- Become A Name (poetry, 2016)
- Pitch Craft: The Writer's Guide to Getting Agented, Published, and Paid (non-fiction, 2025)

== Awards ==
- For Sister Mischief
  - Best of the Bay, San Francisco Bay Guardian 2012
  - Top 10 selection of American Library Association's Rainbow List for excellence in GLBTQ YA literature 2012
- For Farah Goes Bang
  - Norah Ephron Prize, Tribeca Film Festival 2013
  - Comcast Narrative Competition, CAAMFest
  - Bud Abbott Award for Feature Length Comedy, Garden State Film Festival 2014
  - Best Narrative Feature, Austin Asian American Film Festival 2014
- For non-fiction
  - Steinbeck Fellowship at San José State University 2018–2019
  - Bread Loaf Writers' Conference at Middlebury College 2019
