= Didn't Die =

- Film poster
- Directed by: Meera Menon
- Written by: Meera Menon; Paul Gleason
- Produced by: Joe Camerota; Erica Fishman; Paul Gleason; Meera Menon
- Starring: Kiran Deol; Vishal Vijayakumar; Samrat Chakrabarti; Katie McCuen; George Basil
- Cinematography: Paul Gleason
- Edited by: Geoff Boothby
- Music by: Samuel Jones
- Distributed by: Level 33 Entertainment
- Release dates: January 28, 2025 (Sundance); March 6, 2026
- Running time: 89 minutes
- Country: United States
- Language: English

Didn't Die is a 2025 American black and white zombie film written and directed by Meera Menon. It premiered at the 2025 Sundance Film Festival.

Menon's husband, Paul Gleason, was the film's co-writer and cinematographer.

== Plot ==
Vinita Malhotra, an Indian American podcaster celebrating her 100th episode, discovers the world has descended into a zombie apocalypse.

== Critical reception ==
On the review aggregator website Rotten Tomatoes, 61% of 41 critics' reviews are positive. The website's consensus reads: "Didn't Die mixes lo-fi visuals, humor, and horror effectively, but uneven pacing and a slight premise keep its drama from fully landing."

Josiah Teal of Film Threat described the film as "a hopeful zombie narrative with more than a few heartwarming moments and just enough quirk to earn its laughs. Menon has crafted a sweet zombie film without ever losing its gruesome edge."

Michael Dunaway and Alisha Patterson, in an interview with the film's cast for Paste, called "An impressive achievement for Menon and her actors."

Ritesh Mehta of Filmmaker wrote that it was a "delightfully desi zombie film—probably the first of its kind?—with characters enjoying dosa in the apocalypse, sipping 'chai tea' and joking about the wackiness of having a Hindu wedding in July."

In a review for Collider, Emma Kiely wrote that "The horror and zombie aspects of Didn't Die are merely distractions from where Menon's talents truly lie — capturing the quiet subtleties that make us human."

Siddhant Adlakha of Variety gave the film a mixed review, writing that the film "almost works. Ironically, it narrowly misses cohesion, and the spark of life, because its premise keeps centering the dead."
