= Audiomatic =

Indian podcast network

Audiomatic, India’s first podcast network, launched in April, 2015. The podcasts are either weekly or fortnightly, and offer content in genres such as food, science, culture, current affairs, entertainment and humor.

Among their podcasts are: The Real Food Podcast, The Intersection, Ask Aakar Anything, Our Last Week, and more. The Real Food Podcast is hosted by food writer Vikram Doctor, who explores ingredients and Indian food habits and obsessions. The Intersection is a science and culture-based podcast, which is hosted by journalists Samanth Subramanium and Padmaparna Ghosh. The podcast offers a mix of science, culture and history. Ask Aakar Anything is hosted by journalist and columnist Aakar Patel. The program is an opinion-based podcast and features Aakar Patel answering questions posed by the show’s listeners. Our Last Week is a comedy podcast that is hosted by stand-up comic Anuvab Pal and actor and director Kunaal Roy Kapur. The show features observational comedy and follows a conversational format.

== Reception ==
According to an interview of one of the founders in the Mumbai-based daily Mid-Day, Audiomatic garnered 80,000 listeners in the first three weeks of its launch. Audiomatic has been praised for the high quality of production that its podcasts feature. Dustin Silgardo, in Mint Lounge, business newspaper Mint’s weekend edition, said that the music is used cleverly in the background and also noted that the “nuanced observations” on Our Last Week are “refreshing”. The Intersection has been particularly praised for its quality of research and for its ability to create a narrative. The New Indian Express appreciated the “heavy dose of wit and charm” that the podcast features.
