= Amol Rathod =

Indian cinematographer

- Born: India
- Occupation: Cinematographer
- Years active: July 2004–present
- Known for: Bombay Summer

Amol Rathod is an Indian cinematographer who primarily works for Tollywood and Bollywood. His first film as a cinematographer was Oh, My God in 2008.

== Career ==
Rathod began his career as an assistant to cinematographer Amit Roy, in films directed by Ram Gopal Varma.

He was the cinematographer for the 2009 film Bombay Summer.

== Filmography ==
Year	Film	Language	Notes
2009	Oh, My God	Hindi	Debut
2009	Bombay Summer	English	
2010	Rakta Charitra	Hindi	
2010	Rakta Charitra 2	Hindi	
2011	Nenu Naa Rakshasi	Telugu	
2011	A Decent Arrangement	English	
2011	Bbuddah... Hoga Terra Baap	Hindi	
2013	Iddarammayilatho	Telugu	
2014	Heart Attack	Telugu	
2014	I Am That Change	Telugu	Short film
2015	Akhil	Telugu	
2017	Sarkar 3	Hindi	
2017	Meri Beti Sunny Leone Banna Chaahti Hai	Hindi	Short film
2018	Dil Juunglee	Hindi	
2019	Laddoo	Hindi	
2019	Raid	Hindi	TV film
2021	12 'O' Clock	Hindi	
2021	Six	Hindi	Web series on Disney+Hotstar
2023	Gandeevadhari Arjuna	Telugu	

=== Other roles ===
Year	Film	Language	Notes
2004	Dil Maange More	Hindi	Assistant cinematographer
2005	Sarkar	Hindi	Assistant cinematographer
2007	Nishabd	Hindi	First assistant cinematographer
2007	Aag	Hindi	First assistant cinematographer
2007	Darling	Hindi	First assistant cinematographer
2008	Sarkar Raj	Hindi	First assistant cinematographer
2010	Rann	Hindi	Second unit only
