= Bombay Summer =

- Film poster
- Directed by: Joseph Mathew
- Written by: Joseph Mathew
- Starring: Tannishtha Chatterjee; Samrat Chakrabarti; Jatin Goswami; Gaurav Dwivedi
- Cinematography: Amol Rathod
- Release date: 2009
- Country: United States
- Languages: English; Hindi

Bombay Summer is 2009 film starring Tannishtha Chatterjee and Samrat Chakrabarti and directed by Joseph Mathew with cinematography by Amol Rathod.

== Plot ==
A close friendship between three young people in India, Jaidev, a writer, Geeta, his girlfriend, and Madan, a drug dealing artist, blooms and eventually disintegrates in the face of betrayal.

== Critical reception ==
The New York Times, "It’s the rare film set in India that speaks the melancholy language of the international art house."

/Film, "Bombay Summer feels a little without consequence, an exercise in fetishizing the city or in filling up the gaps between the classes with startling gloss."

The Village Voice, "Bombay Summer’s keen sense of nostalgia for a fleeting present is the real heartbreaker."
