= Man Underground =

- Directed by: Michael Borowiec; Sam Marine
- Written by: Michael Borowiec; Sam Marine
- Starring: George Basil; Andy Rocco; Pamela Fila
- Distributed by: Indican Pictures
- Release date: July 22, 2016 (Fantasia International Film Festival)
- Country: United States
- Language: English

Man Underground is a 2016 science fiction film written and directed by Michael Borowiec and Sam Marine.

== Cast ==
- George Basil as Willem Koda
- Andy Rocco as Todd Muckle
- Pamela Fila as Flossie Ferguson
- Felix Hagen as Francis
- Stephen Girasuolo as Stan Bowman
- Eleanor Hutchins as Lorraine

== Plot ==
A conspiracy theorist enlists people from his small town to help him make a film about his experiences encountering aliens while working as a US government geologist.
