= Scooby-Doo! in Where's My Mummy? =

- UK DVD cover
- Directed by: Joe Sichta
- Screenplay by: George Doty IV; Ed Scharlach; Joe Sichta
- Story by: Catherine Trillo; Thommy Wojciechowski
- Based on: Scooby-Doo by Joe Ruby and Ken Spears
- Produced by: Margaret M. Dean; Joe Sichta
- Starring: Frank Welker; Casey Kasem; Mindy Cohn; Grey DeLisle-Griffin; Christine Baranski; Oded Fehr; Ajay Naidu; Ron Perlman; Jeremy Piven; Wynton Marsalis; Virginia Madsen
- Edited by: Rob Desales
- Music by: Thomas Chase Jones
- Production company: Warner Bros. Animation
- Distributed by: Kidtoon Films (theatrical); Warner Home Video (home video)
- Release dates: May 13, 2005 (Theatrical); November 24, 2005 (Cartoon Network); December 13, 2005 (Home Video)
- Running time: 75 minutes
- Country: United States
- Language: English

Scooby-Doo! in Where's My Mummy? is a 2005 American animated fantasy adventure film, and the ninth in a series of direct-to-video animated films based on the Scooby-Doo Saturday morning cartoons. The film had a limited theatrical release in the United States on May 13, 2005. The film was first aired on Cartoon Network in the United States on November 24, 2005. It was released on VHS and DVD in the United States and Canada on December 13, 2005. It was produced by Warner Bros. Animation, though it featured a logo and copyright for Hanna-Barbera Cartoons, Inc. at the end. This is the last Scooby-Doo film to have a VHS release.

== Plot ==
In a flashback to 41 B.C.E, following her losses at the Battle of Actium and Battle of Alexandria, Cleopatra visits her tomb beneath the Sphinx to bury a treasure and form an undead army of her fallen soldiers to protect it. As she prepares for her own death, she casts a curse upon the treasure to protect it.

In the present day, Velma Dinkley works with an archaeological team led by Prince Omar to restore the Sphinx, during which they find an ancient necklace and stumble onto Cleopatra's tomb. Meanwhile, Velma's friends in Mystery Inc. travel to Egypt for a surprise visit. Though their van, the Mystery Machine, breaks down in the desert, they receive help in reaching the Sphinx from Amahl Ali Akbar and his hawk Horus. Upon their arrival, they also encounter Rock Rivers, the host of Fear Facers whose show was recently cancelled after he was caught faking footage and who came to Egypt to investigate Cleopatra's curse. Eventually, the gang reunite with Velma before they are interrupted by a group of treasure hunters led by a heavy-handed archeologist named Dr. Amelia Von Butch. Over Velma's pleas of Cleopatra's curse, which says all who enter will be turned to stone, Amelia's group use explosives to detonate the entrance. Suddenly, a sandstorm forces everyone inside, where Mystery Inc. find a petrified Omar. Despite this, Amelia's group press on while Fred Jones opts to solve the mystery. Velma reluctantly agrees and the gang follow Amelia, only to activate a trap that separates Shaggy Rogers and his dog Scooby-Doo from them.

As the undead army attacks all three groups, Velma is found seemingly petrified. Rivers, Fred, and Daphne Blake retrieve the necklace from her and eventually find Amelia's group, whereupon they are all attacked by Cleopatra, who has risen as a revenant. Though Fred and Daphne escape outside and reach a bazaar, Amelia catches up to them, steals the necklace, and knocks them out. Amahl finds the pair and offers to help them find their friends. Concurrently, Scooby and Shaggy end up in a hidden lost city, where they are mistaken by its inhabitants for their pharaoh, Ascoobis, and his manservant Shagankhamen respectively. While reaping the benefits, the city's high priest Hotep arranges to have them sacrificed to the "Spirit of the Sand", but the pair expose it as a giant robot before Fred, Daphne, and Amahl arrive. After exposing Hotep as a disgraced civil engineer named Armin Granger, who is wanted for illegally damming the Nile, and seeing him arrested by local authorities, the trio tell Shaggy and Scooby what happened to Velma before Fred formulates a plan to stop Amelia.

Returning to the main chamber, Mystery Inc. find Amelia captured by Cleopatra's army while her team has been petrified. Per Fred's plan, Daphne dresses as Cleopatra and leads the lost city's citizens into battle against the undead army. In the chaos, Amelia steals Cleopatra's crown, but causes the Nile to burst into the tomb, flushing its riches outside. After subduing Amelia, Mystery Inc. discovers the Cleopatra revenant is actually Velma. She reveals that the undead soldiers are Omar and his workers, the petrified victims were statues, and Amelia's team were safely captured. Aware of Amelia's intentions, Omar recruited Velma to help him stop her and hired Rivers to document the experience to gain historical protection for the tomb.

Afterward, Amelia and her group are arrested while Omar's team finish restoring the Sphinx. Though Shaggy accidentally fires a large firecracker at it and destroys its nose, Omar feels the Sphinx looks better without it and everyone shares a laugh.

== Voice cast ==
- Frank Welker as Scooby-Doo and Fred Jones
- Casey Kasem as Shaggy Rogers
- Mindy Cohn as Velma Dinkley
- Grey DeLisle-Griffin as Daphne Blake and Natasha
- Christine Baranski as Amelia Von Butch
- Ajay Naidu as Prince Omar Karam
- Ron Perlman as Armin Granger/Hotep and Ancient One #2
- Jeremy Piven as Rock Rivers
- Wynton Marsalis as Campbell
- Oded Fehr as Amahl Ali Akbar/AAA and Ancient One #1
- Virginia Madsen as Cleopatra

== Reception ==
The film is ranked highly amongst Scooby-Doo films.
