= Onteora Central School District =

School district in the U.S. state of New York

Location
- Boiceville, New York United States

District information
- Grades: K - 12
- Superintendent: Victoria McLaren
- Schools: 5

Other information
- Website: http://www.onteora.k12.ny.us/

Onteora Central School District is a school district in Boiceville, New York, United States.

The superintendent is Victoria McLaren.

== Schools ==
The district operates the following schools:

- Onteora High School
- Onteora Middle School
- Bennett Elementary School
- Phoenicia Elementary School (closed)
- Woodstock Elementary School
