= Anuvab Pal =

Indian stand-up comedian (born 1976)

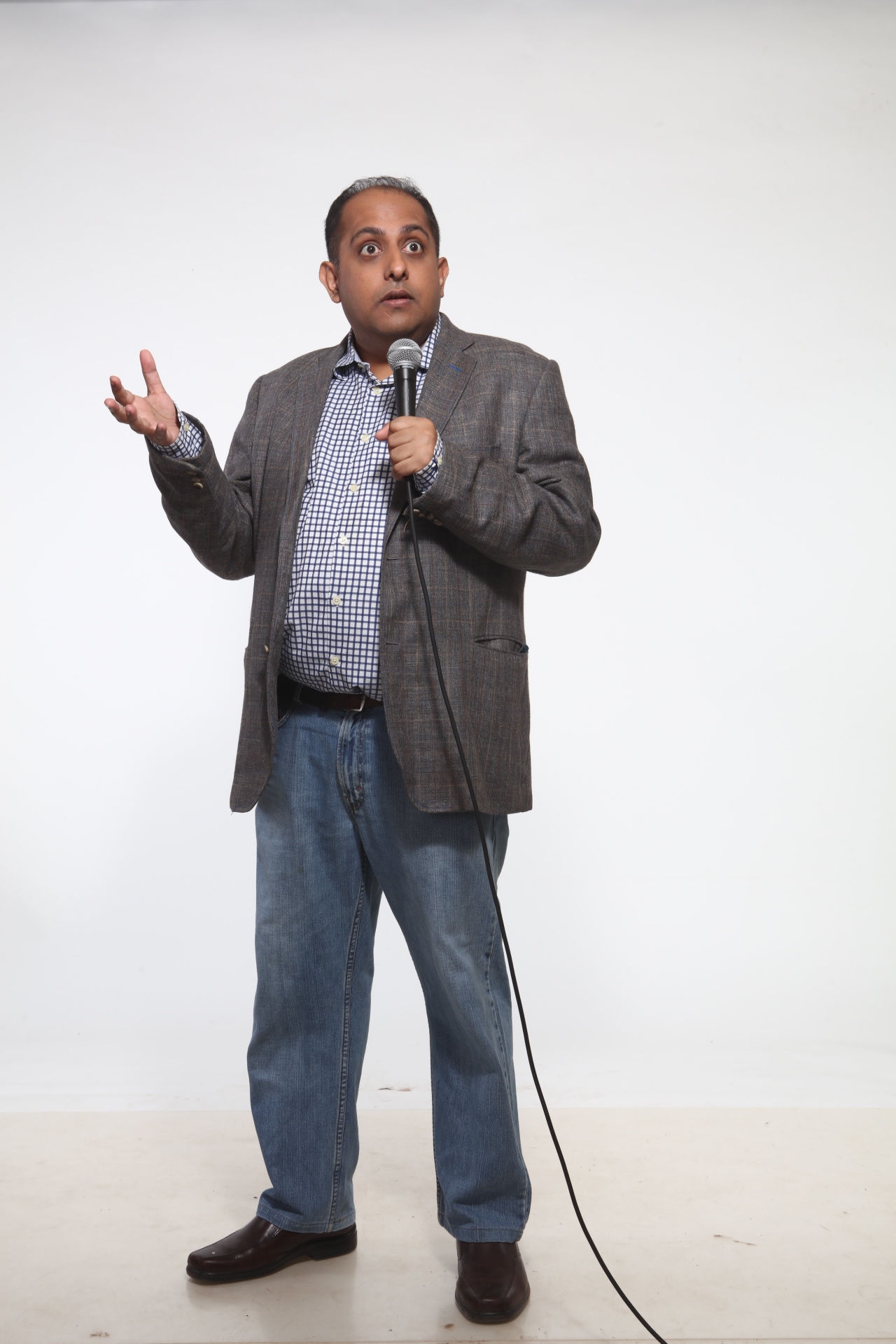
- Born: 27 April 1976 (age 50); Kolkata, India
- Education: La Martiniere Calcutta; Ohio Wesleyan University
- Occupations: Stand up comedian, screenwriter, playwright and novelist

Anuvab Pal (born 27 April 1976) is an Indian stand up comedian, screenwriter, playwright and novelist. He is occasionally featured as a rotating co-host on the fourth season of the podcast The Bugle.

== Career ==
=== 2007-2016: Career beginnings ===
Pal co-wrote the 2007 Indian comedy Loins of Punjab Presents with Manish Acharya, which The New York Times called 'a witty musical comedy'.

In 2009, Pal's play The President Is Coming was made into a Bollywood film, The President Is Coming, made by producer Rohan Sippy.

As a stand-up comedian, Pal started out with the British Comedy Store when it opened in Mumbai in 2010 and has since toured across the nation with his one-man show The Nation Wants To Know in Mumbai, New Delhi, Kolkata, Shillong, Bangalore, and Pune.

Pal's first play, Chaos Theory, a love story between two Indian professors, was written in New York City; it was performed in various productions around the United States. The Los Angeles Times, while writing about the Artwallah Festival, a South Asian cultural festival where the play was performed in 2003, said "Pal's characters are professional immigrants whose questions may not be so much about economic survival as intellectual and spiritual survival." The play received its first professional production in New York City in 2010, starring TV and film actor Rita Wolf, directed by Alexa Kelly and produced by The Pulse Ensemble Theatre.

The Indian production of the play happened in 2008, starring actors Zafar Karachiwala and Anahita Oberoi directed by Rahul Da Cunha and produced by his Rage Productions.

In 2011, Pal was featured in a New York Times video, A Night At The Comedy Club. CNN Go, a travel website of CNN, mentioned him on a list of 20 Mumbai People To Watch.

Pal was also interviewed in the BBC News segment titled Having A Laugh In India and was, along with comedian and presenter Cyrus Broacha, the only Indian comedian on the popular BBC Radio 4 show Just A Minute with Nicholas Parsons. The episode also featured famous British comedians Paul Merton and Marcus Brigstocke.

Pal contributes columns often to magazines like Time Out Mumbai. Three of his plays, Chaos Theory, The President Is Coming and 1 888 Dial India have been published as novels. He has also written a non-fiction book on the Bollywood movie, Disco Dancer.

=== 2017-present: Established comedian ===
Pal released his stand up special, Alive At 40, on Amazon Prime. In 2018, his eight-episode comedy Going Viral starring Kunaal Roy Kapur was also produced by Amazon Prime.

In February 2018, Pal performed his stand up special The Nation Wants To Know at Harvard Business School, as part of the Harvard South Asia Conference.

In May 2018, Pal premiered his next stand up special, The Empire, at London's Soho Theatre. Followed by this, in August he made his debut at Edinburgh Festival Fringe with the same show which was met with good reception.

In 2018, Pal appeared on four different shows for the BBC. He debuted on BBC's Fresh from the Fringe, performing highlights of his Edinburgh Festival show. He made an appearance on BBC 2's Big Asian Stand Up as part of BBC's The British Asian Summer. His two-part radio series with Andy Zaltzman titled Empire-ical Evidence, tracing the legacy of The Empire in London and Kolkata was broadcast on BBC Radio 4 in October 2018. In December 2018, Pal was invited by the BBC World Service Arts Hour to The Arts Hour New Year International Comedy Show. He also appeared on QI, on the third episode of the 17th series, on the topic of "Quarrels".

In late summer 2018, Pal became the first Indian comedian to perform before a sell out crowd at the Lund Comedy Festival in Lund, Sweden.

In 2019, Pal performed for the first time at the Melbourne Comedy Festival in a show titled Indian All-Star Comedy Showcase.

The Victoria and Albert Museum, V&A in London, did a permanent exhibit titled 'Laughing Matters: State Of The Nation' under the heading 'Cruel Brittannia'. It featured clippings and writings from Pal's stand up show 'The Empire'.

In 2020, Pal's long running podcast Our Last Week with Anuvab and Kunaal, also featuring Bollywood actor Kunaal Roy Kapur, produced by Audiomatic, was picked up by Spotify as a Spotify original exclusive for India. The Hindu newspaper, referring to the podcast, called the hosts "The Kings of nonsensical banter" The podcast was also featured by NPR in a show titled Code Switch in August 2016. The segment was titled What's so funny about The Indian Accent?

In 2020, Pal wrote a sitcom for Amazon Prime India directed by Rohan Sippy, with the pandemic as the backdrop. It was titled Wakaalat From Home and starred Sumeet Vyas, Kubbra Sait, Nidhi Singh and Gopal Datt. Indian Express in its review, called it "a must watch show".

In 2020, Pal was also a panelist on the BBC Radio 4 show The News Quiz hosted by Andy Zaltzman

In 2021, according to an article in The Guardian, the BBC announced that Pal's sitcom pilot titled Empire would feature as part of Festival Of Funny, on BBC Radio 2. Empire starred famous British actor, comedian, writer, presenter Stephen Fry.

In 2022, post pandemic, Pal returned to the Soho Theatre with his Edinburgh show Democracy and Disco Dancing, which received a series of four-star reviews. Reviewers said the show was a "laugh a minute" and "hilariously absurd".

Pal also appeared as a panelist in a number of BBC radio shows including The BBC Radio Scotland show The Good, The Bad and The Unexpected and Comedians Vs The News on BBC World Service.

As an actor, Pal played Mr. Mukherjee in the Mira Nair directorial A Suitable Boy, based on the novel of the same name by Vikram Seth for BBC 1.

Chortle, the British comedy website, announced on 22 December 2021, that Anuvab Pal and Mark Watson would be part of a Soho Theatre line up of stand up comedy specials on Amazon Prime Video UK. Pal's show The Empire was recorded at the Soho Theatre in London in January 2021 for release on 6 May 2022.

In June 2023, Broadway's The Roundabout Theatre Company in New York City, did a staged reading of Chaos Theory starring American-Indian actors Manu Narayan and Rita Wolf directed by Arpita Mukherjee as part of 2023 Refocus Projects.

In September 2023, Pal was featured in a Sky History documentary titled Why Does Everyone Hate The British Empire hosted by comedian Al Murray. In a Daily Telegraph review of the show, Anita Singh, said Mr. Pal was 'witty'.

In 2024, Anuvab featured in the TV series, Freedom at Midnight, produced by SonyLIV, and created by Bollywood director Nikkhil Advani, where he played the controversial Chief Minister of pre-independence Bengal, Huseyn Suhrawardy.

In June 2024, Pal's 16-city UK tour of his new stand-up special The Department of Britishness (ending with a sold out run at London’s Soho Theatre), earned him recognition; The Guardian called him ‘one of the founding fathers of Indian stand-up’ and The Daily Telegraph, in their profile of him, calling him ‘lovably modest’.
