= Emile Brunel Studio and Sculpture Garden =

- U.S. National Register of Historic Places
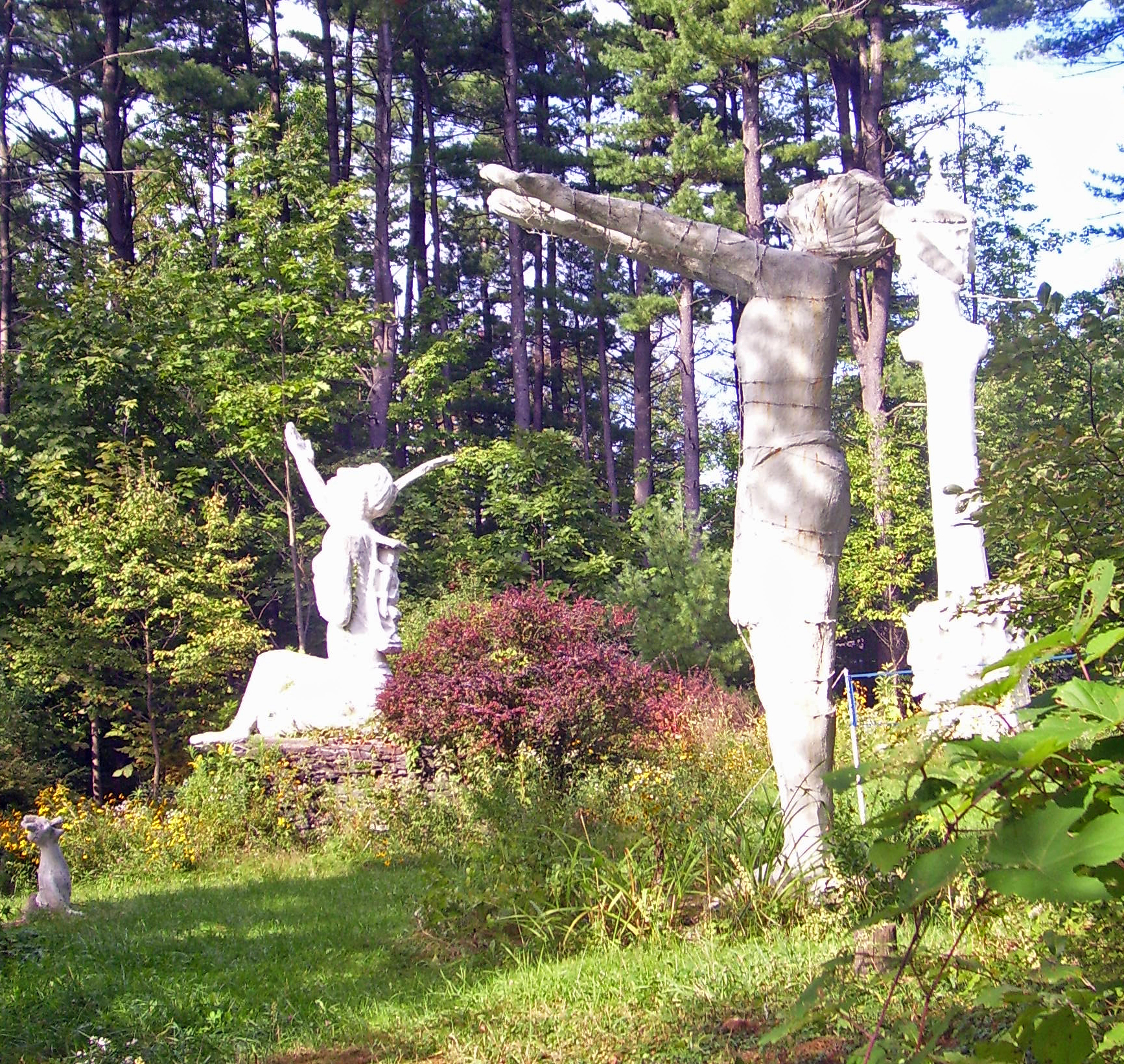
- Natache (left), Moon Haw Haw and Great White Spirit, 2008

- Location within New York Location within the United States
- Location: Boiceville, New York
- Nearest city: Kingston
- Coordinates: 41°59′59″N 74°15′50″W
- Area: 1.3 acres (5,300 m^{2})
- Built: 1918–47
- Architect: Emile Brunel
- Architectural style: Arts and Crafts
- NRHP reference No.: 99000909
- Added to NRHP: August 10, 1999

The Emile Brunel Sculpture Garden and Studio, also known as the Totem Indian Trading Post, Le Chalet Indien, and Brunel Park, is located on Da Silva Road, just off the NY 28 state highway, in Boiceville, Town of Olive, New York, United States. It consists of seven sculptures and three buildings.

Brunel was a French immigrant and artist who had become fascinated by the Native American tribes of the West during his travels there in the early 20th century. After a successful career as a photographer he bought a tract of land in the Catskills and built a studio residence and a resort on it, decorated with sculptures inspired by the Native American art he had seen. The resort closed and the statues were relocated soon thereafter when Route 28 was widened through it at the end of World War II, but the sculpture garden remained a popular roadside attraction afterwards.

In 1929 Brunel began construction of a studio residence on the site in the "neo-rustic" or French Arts and Craft style. His wife and daughter (both named Gladyse) kept the sculpture garden maintained after his death in 1944, operating a nearby souvenir shop until 1985. The artist's home and studio remain intact, and were listed on the National Register of Historic Places in 1999.

== Property ==
The studio and sculpture garden are located on a 1.3-acre (5,300 m^{2}) lot at the intersection of Da Silva and Route 28, approximately a half-mile (1 km) south of the small hamlet of Boiceville. The area is primarily wooded, with the land generally sloping westward towards Esopus Creek. There are some other houses on the former resort property uphill and to the east, and along Route 28 to the south. The land across the highway is undeveloped since it is owned by the New York City Department of Environmental Protection as a buffer for Ashokan Reservoir to the south.

There are nine resources on the property. Seven (the sculptures and totem poles) are art objects and three are buildings: the studio, a shed and a log cabin fronting on Da Silva. The latter was built in 1960 to serve as a souvenir store and is thus not old enough to be considered a contributing resource to the National Register listing.

=== Studio ===
The studio, on the west side of Da Silva, is a two-story frame building with exposed basement, sided in rough stucco with carved reliefs of Native American scenes and a profile of Brunel and his wife with the legend "Le don de Dieu" (French for "the gift of God"). Its gabled roof, with broad overhanging eaves, is pierced on the south (front) by two gabled dormer windows. Fenestration is irregular and asymmetrical.

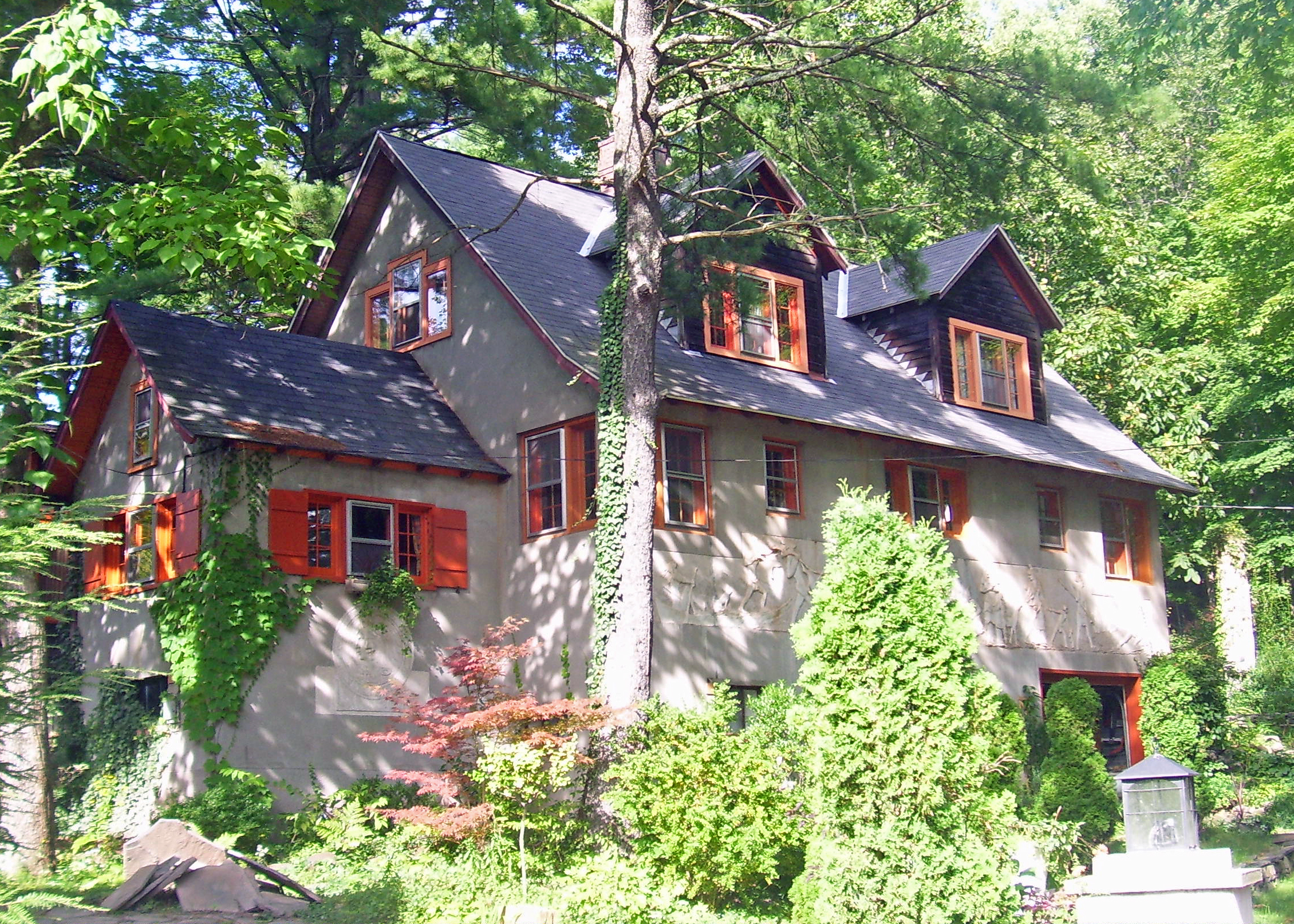
South elevation and west profile of studio, 2008

Inside it has a garage and storage room on the first story, a living room, kitchen and dining room on the second, and bedrooms in the attic. The first floor fireplace has a stucco surround with carvings of large birds, and birds are also painted on the windows. Finishes of fiberboard sheathing, simple moldings, beamed ceilings and built-in cabinetry are original.

=== Sculpture garden ===
A short path west of the house climbs a gentle rise a short distance to the sculpture garden. It is dominated by three large sculptures created by shaped wire mesh filled with rocks and then covered in concrete. On the south of the garden is the 30-foot–tall (10 m) Moon Haw Haw, a male figure with a single feather at the rear of his head looking skywards towards the Burroughs Range to the west with both arms outstretched, palms facing upwards. It is complemented by Natache, a similarly attired seated female figure with one hand held aloft. On her back is a child in a papoose.

The third sculpture, The Great White Spirit, is located in the north corner. It is a tree with spreading roots, of the same height as Moon Haw Haw. At its top are four faces representing Buddhism, Christianity, Islam and Judaism. They are complemented by four faces at the base, representing the vices of jealousy, greed, hate and lust. Alternatively the four faces at the base represent the anti-thesis of those on top: Jesus and Satan; Moses and Pharaoh; Buddha and Mara, the king of Demons; and Mohammed and Bacchus, the god of wine. The work was Brunel's last and also serves as his monument, as his ashes are interred within it.

There are also two large totem poles made by the same method. A third which collapsed and was partially buried was resurrected in 2002. Smaller sculptures, including a nesting pelican and seated chief, which serves as a bbq chimney are also located around the garden.

== History ==
A native of Châteauneuf, Brunel came to the U.S. in 1904 at the age of 30. He set out for the West, where for several years he made a living as an itinerant painter, focusing on scenes of the vanishing frontier life and painting signs and broadsides for traveling circuses and whiskey makers. Shortly after his arrival he met his future wife, Gladyse McCloud, a 14-year-old girl working as a caricaturist at one of the circuses. He promised to return for her when he had become successful.

He began turning to photography, using newer camera equipment and finding Native Americans a major subject. His photographs began to sell, and he returned to New York. There he became involved with the early film industry, where he met and later worked for Cecil B. DeMille. He produced and directed a film, The Hand of God, founded the New York Institute of Photography and perfected one-hour film processing, an advance which allowed dailies to become part of the filmmaking process.

Building on this, he established himself as a photojournalist for the New York Times Magazine, and started a chain of photo studios in the upscale commercial districts in Manhattan, including studios in Tiffany's and Bloomingdales. He had achieved success, and called for Gladyse, still not yet out of her teens. She returned, and the couple married.

His success allowed him to start purchasing the land around an existing hotel in the Catskills in 1918. Eventually he acquired 77 acres (31 ha) around the current property, which became the Chalet Indien resort. He added tennis and croquet courts, bridle paths, and what local lore claims was the first Olympic-size swimming pool in Ulster County.

The resort was very successful, with many celebrity guests, due to its location on Route 28's C-shaped course up through the Catskills into the Adirondacks, in an era when auto touring was just beginning. During WWII it was a choice vacation spot among New York's European cultural elite. It was listed as the summer time residence of Broadway producer Harold Prince, father and son abstract painters Max and Jimmy Ernst, the Austrian composer Karol Rathaus, and the architect Frederick John Kiesler. Jimmy Ernst painted one of his very first mural's for the hotel's parlor. Edward the VII and Mrs. Simpson also were known to be frequent guests as were Enrico Caruso and George M. Cohan. Brunel also counted the Roosevelt's amongst his many friends. Eleanor Roosevelt once wrote to him: "I have long since ceased caring about what other people may think."

Brunel exhibited Native art and artifacts he had collected out west along with his own sculptures that he had started making in the years after he had bought the land. In 1929 he built a home and studio in an Arts and Crafts style evoking the farmhouses of his native France. It was an unusual house for the area, where most older houses reflect Dutch and English building traditions

Chalet Indien continued to prosper over the next two decades. In 1944, two events led to its demise. The state announced plans to reroute Route 28 in a way that compromised the future of the resort, and Brunel died. Before World War II ended the following year, it would close.

Gladyse and the Brunels' daughter continued to operate the trading post on the property, selling goods manufactured by local tribes. They sold off parcels of the resort and consolidated the sculptures in their present garden and built the log cabin for the store around 1960, nine years after Gladyse died. Her daughter continued to run the store until her death in 1985; after that, her own daughter kept it going for another ten years before selling it. It closed around the end of the 20th century. In 1997 the property was sold to the current owners who have been preserving the home and restoring the gardens in keeping with the original style, spirit and unrealized plans for both.

== See also ==
- National Register of Historic Places listings in Ulster County, New York
