= Loins of Punjab Presents =

- Movie poster for Loins of Punjab Presents
- Directed by: Manish Acharya
- Written by: Manish Acharya; Anuvab Pal
- Produced by: Manish Acharya
- Starring: Shabana Azmi; Ayesha Dharker; Ajay Naidu
- Cinematography: Arvind Kannabiran
- Edited by: Chris Dillon
- Music by: Michael Cohen
- Distributed by: Horn OK Please Entertainment
- Release date: 21 September 2007
- Countries: India; United States
- Language: English

Loins of Punjab Presents is a 2007 Indian film directed by Manish Acharya. It stars Shabana Azmi, Ayesha Dharker and Ajay Naidu. The film marked Acharya's feature directorial debut.

== Plot ==
A New Jersey town catches Bollywood fever when five Indian-Americans and one Jewish Indophile compete in an amateur Indian Idol-style singing contest. Loins of Punjab Presents satirizes non-resident Indians and Bollywood fans as they vie for the title of "Desi Idol."

== Cast ==
- Shabana Azmi as Rrita Kapoor
- Ayesha Dharker as Opama Menon
- Ajay Naidu as Turbanotorious B.D.G.
- Manish Acharya as Vikram Jaiswal
- Jameel Khan as Mr. Amit Bokade
- Darshan Jariwala as Sanjeev Patel
- Loveleen Mishra as Alpa Patel
- Ishita Sharma as Preeti Patel
- Kunaal Roy Kapur as Raghav White
- Michael Raimondi as Josh Cohen
- Samrat Chakrabarti as Trance Sen
- Alexx ONell as Wesminton
- Seema Rahmani as Sanya Rehman
- Yusuf Hussain as Mr. Faiz Rehman

== Music ==
1. "Dhol Beat" - Ajay Naidu, Samrat Chakrabarti
2. "Dhol Beat (DJ Suketu feat. Aks remix)" - Ajay Naidu, Samrat Chakrabarti
