= Dhruvi Acharya =

Indian artist

- Born: 1971 (age 54–55); India
- Education: Sophia Polytechnic, Maryland Institute College of Art
- Known for: Painting
- Spouse: Manish Acharya
- Children: 2
- Website: dhruvi.com

Dhruvi Acharya (born in 1971) is an Indian artist known for her psychologically complex and visually layered paintings. She has recently started creating ceramics. She is based in Mumbai, India.

== Early life and education ==
Dhruvi Acharya was born in 1971 in India and she was raised in Mumbai. She attended Walsingham House School, a private girls school in Mumbai.

Acharya received her undergraduate degree in 1993 in Applied Arts at the Sophia Polytechnic in Mumbai. She went on to receive a Master of Fine Arts (MFA) degree in 1998 from the Hoffberger School of Painting at Maryland Institute College of Art (MICA) in Baltimore, Maryland. At MICA, she studied with painter Grace Hartigan.

She was married to filmmaker Manish Acharya, with whom she had two sons. Manish Acharya died in 2010 in an accident.

== Work ==
Acharya was featured in India Today news magazine in January 2005 as one of the 50 Indians under 35 years of age that are on the "fast track to success."

She has exhibited with the Queens Museum of Art in New York, the San Jose Museum of Art, the National Gallery of Modern Art in Mumbai, the Chhatrapati Shivaji Maharaj Vastu Sangrahalaya museum in Mumbai, Griffith University, Webster University in St. Louis, Brisbane and the former Spazio Oberdan in Milan. In 2017 Acharya participated in the panel Post-Boom: Artists and Their Practices at the Asia Society India Centre in Mumbai.

Acharya's special projects include "painting as performance", with Chitra Ganesh at the India Art Fair in 2015 and "JSW", a 32-foot mural for the Jindal Steel Works Center, Mumbai. Installation titled "what once was, still is, but isn't..." where Acharya submerged the gallery room with cotton fabrics at Morte gallery, Delhi.

Ever since the lockdown in India during Covid-19 pandemic, Acharya painted compulsively and used her watercolours to generate funds and resources for those impacted through Chemould Prescott Road's online viewing room and her own social media handles

== Awards ==
Acharya has been the recipient of the 2014 YFLO Young Women Achiever's Awards.
