= Walsingham House School =

Private school in India

Coordinates: 18.95377°N 72.79624°E

Walsingham House School is a private girls' school founded in 1940 and located in a former palace of the Maharajah of Kutch in South Bombay, India.

== History ==
The school was founded in 1940 by Mrs. Tree and Mrs. Adcock at Oomer Park. Mrs. Tree was the first school principal. In 1950 it moved to Breach Candy, and in 1965 it moved to its current premises which is currently located on L.J Road (Nepean Sea Road). The school is now at Dariya Mahal.

Since 1970, the school is managed by the Mittal Trust, and serving approximately 1,500 students and 103 faculty and staff members.

== Activities ==
In 2015, the school hosted Banganga Tank cleaning project.

== Notable alumni ==
- Swati Piramal, Indian scientist and industrialist
- Dhruvi Acharya, artist
- Kalpana Morparia, banker
- Tarana Raja, actress, dancer, television anchor, and radio host.
