= Bumbug the Musical =

- Promotional poster for limited engagement
- Music: Samrat Chakrabarti
- Lyrics: Samrat Chakrabarti; Sanjiv Jhaveri
- Book: Samrat Chakrabarti; Sanjiv Jhaveri
- Setting: A New York City delicatessen
- Basis: A Christmas Carol
- Premiere: December 5, 2012: The Clurman Theatre

Bumbug the Musical is a 2012 rock musical and contemporary update of Charles Dickens' A Christmas Carol.

The show’s book and lyrics were by creators Samrat Chakrabarti and Sanjiv Jhaveri with music by Chakrabarti.

== Plot ==
During Christmastime in New York City, Scroogewala, a disillusioned Indian immigrant and delicatessen owner that hates the holidays is visited by spirits who guide him toward redemption.

== History ==
The show premiered at The Clurman Theatre in New York City on December 5, 2012.

Show creator Samrat Chakrabarti told The Wall Street Journal, "We wanted to explore the immigrant experience of leaving their country with hopes and dreams, then something happens and they become closed. What makes a scrooge? Someone has to be closed and then open up again."

Bumbug the Musical was reported in the media as being the first full length musical produced and authored by the Indian American diaspora in New York City.

== Critical reception ==
The New York Times, "Mostly the music is straight-ahead theater rock, pleasant but undistinguished," adding, "The show, directed by Mercedes Murphy, feels thin from the start."

Bibi Magazine, "This rock opera is what A Christmas Carol would look like after it got thrown in a blender along with MTV, ABC, NBC and Indian ITV all strained through the mistletoe of immigrant life in modern day America. Presented by LAUGHistan, Bumbug the Musical is a Must-See this holiday season."
