= Manish Acharya =

Indian film director and actor (1967–2010)

Manish G. Acharya
- Born: 14 June 1967
- Died: 4 December 2010 (aged 43); Matheran, Maharashtra
- Occupations: Film director, actor

Manish G. Acharya (14 June 1967 – 4 December 2010) was an Indian film director and actor. Acharya was best known for Loins of Punjab Presents, the film he co-wrote with Anuwab Pal, directed, acted in, and co-produced. Released theatrically to great critical acclaim in 2007 in India and the US, the film starred Shabana Azmi, Ayesha Dharkar and Ajay Naidu among others. Manish Acharya's other film credits include a cameo in the 2009 Zoya Akhtar film Luck by Chance and narration in Nina Paley's animation feature film Sita Sings the Blues.

== Education and career ==
Acharya completed his Undergraduate Studies from Grinnell College in Iowa, USA, with a major in Physics. He then received a Master's degree from Iowa State University in Industrial Relations. Acharya worked in the US corporate world as Head of Marketing at MicroStrategy, and was featured on the cover of Marketing Magazine at the age of 27. At the age of 30, Manish left corporate America to study film directing, and received his Master of Fine Arts degree from New York University (NYU)'s prestigious Tisch School of the Arts. Loins Of Punjab Presents was his first feature film as well as his thesis film, and it became the highest grossing English language comedy in India. It won several awards, including the IFFLA's 2008 Audience Choice Award for Best Feature and Sapporo Asian Film Festival of Dallas's 2008 Best Narrative Feature Award.

== Death ==
Acharya was critically injured in a horse riding accident on 4 December 2010, in Matheran, India. He was quickly transported to Ambani Hospital in Nerul; however, the doctors declared him dead. He is survived by his wife, artist Dhruvi Acharya and their two children Malhar and Aman.
