= Werewolves Within =

2016 video game

- Developer: Red Storm Entertainment
- Publisher: Ubisoft
- Platforms: Microsoft Windows, PlayStation 4
- Release: 6 December 2016
- Genre: Social deduction
- Mode: Multiplayer

Werewolves Within is a multiplayer social-deduction VR game for Oculus Rift, Windows, and PlayStation VR, developed by Red Storm Entertainment, published by Ubisoft, and released on 6 December 2016.

Werewolves Within received positive reviews from critics.

== Gameplay ==
The game is set in a medieval-fantasy town that is being attacked by a werewolf, and players are tasked to guess which of the townsfolk is the werewolf in disguise in a Mafia-style format.

== Reception ==
Reception

Aggregate score
Aggregator	Score
Metacritic	PS4: 76/100

Review scores
Publication	Score
GameSpot	7/10
IGN	6.0/10

Werewolves Within received "generally favorable" reviews, according to Metacritic.

The Official UK PlayStation Magazine listed it as the ninth best PS VR game.

== Film adaptation ==
In October 2018, it was announced Werewolves Within was being developed as a feature film, with Mishna Wolff set to write the screenplay for the film, while Ubisoft Motion Pictures would produce. In January 2020, it was announced Sam Richardson had joined the cast of the film and would serve as a producer, with Josh Ruben to direct. In February 2020, Michael Chernus, Michaela Watkins, Cheyenne Jackson, Milana Vayntrub, George Basil, Sarah Burns, Catherine Curtin, Wayne Duvall, Harvey Guillén and Rebecca Henderson joined the cast of the film.

Principal photography began in February 2020.
