= Farah Goes Bang =

2013 American film directed by Meera Menon

- Film poster
- Directed by: Meera Menon
- Written by: Meera Menon; Laura Goode
- Produced by: Danielle Firoozi; Erica Fishman; Laura Goode; Liz Singh
- Starring: Nikohl Boosheri
- Release date: April 9, 2013 (Tribeca)
- Running time: 92 minutes
- Language: English

Farah Goes Bang is a 2013 American road-trip comedy directed by Meera Menon, and written by Menon and Laura Goode. The film was produced by Goode, Erica Fishman, Danielle Firoozi, and Liz Singh. The film was Menon's feature film debut and premiered at the 2013 Tribeca Film Festival where it won The Nora Ephron Prize. The film was picked up for distribution by Seed&Spark, and received a VOD release in April 2015.

== Plot ==
Three best friends and recent grads, Farah, Roopa and K.J., embark on a cross-country trip across America to canvas for John Kerry in 2004. Though the plan is to travel from Los Angeles where they live, to Ohio in order to campaign the girls decide to campaign on their road trip anyway.

Farah (Nikohl Boosheri) is the only one among her friends who is still a virgin, despite having had the opportunity to have sex in the past. Her friends encourage her to have sex on the trip and along the way speak to their experiences losing their virginity. After K.J. tells Farah that she bled after having sex for the first time, Farah penetrates herself with a toy gun in order to rip her hymen so that she won't bleed when she chooses to have sex.

In Ohio the friends try to register voters. They also witness Barack Obama's 2004 Democratic National Convention keynote address on the TV and, along with other Ohio canvassers talk about their desire to inspire change in their country.

On election day the friends go to a bar in order to wait out the results. While K.J. and Roopa set off some fireworks together, Farah leaves with a handsome stranger she encounters, who turns out to be a veteran of the War in Afghanistan. Farah and the stranger sleep together and she then returns to her friends. They congratulate Farah for having sex and the three of them set off the final firework together.

In the morning Farah awakens to see Kerry's concession speech. Heartbroken the friends head out to the lake once more and admit that Kerry was not that great of a candidate.

== Cast ==
- Nikohl Boosheri - Farah Mahtab
- George Basil - Jared
- Kiran Deol - Roopa Raj
- Kandis Erickson - K.J. Lux
- Julie Lake - Campaigner

== Reception ==
The film received praise from The Hollywood Reporter, which noted the "film’s warm-hearted treatment of its central characters."
