= Touch and Go (1986 film) =

1986 film by Robert Mandel

- Theatrical release poster
- Directed by: Robert Mandel
- Written by: Alan Ormsby; Bob Sand; Harry Colomby
- Produced by: Stephen J. Friedman
- Starring: Michael Keaton; María Conchita Alonso; Ajay Naidu
- Cinematography: Richard H. Kline
- Edited by: Walt Mulconery
- Music by: Georges Delerue; Sylvester Levay
- Production company: Kings Road Entertainment
- Distributed by: Tri-Star Pictures
- Release date: August 22, 1986
- Running time: 101 minutes
- Country: United States
- Language: English
- Budget: $10 million
- Box office: $1,254,040

Touch and Go is a 1986 American romantic comedy-drama film directed by Robert Mandel, starring Michael Keaton, María Conchita Alonso and Ajay Naidu.

== Plot ==
Bobby Barbato is a pro ice hockey player in Chicago. As always, he expects cheering crowds and beautiful women coming after him. But one day, a gang of youths begin to mug him but he manages to fend them off and then catches the youngest member of the gang, Louis DeLeon. He then gives Louis a ride home and meets the boy's mother, a Hispanic woman named Denise. After a fight, Bobby moves on with his life but then he and Denise begin to fall for each other and Louis eventually becomes close friends with the hockey player.

== Cast ==
- Michael Keaton as Bobby Barbato
- María Conchita Alonso as Denise DeLeon
- Ajay Naidu as Louis DeLeon
- John Reilly as Jerry Pepper
- Richard Venture as Gower
- Lara Jill Miller as Courtney
- Cynthia Cypert as 2nd Girl in Bar

== Production ==
The film was wrapped in late 1984 and intended for a 1985 release but then shelved, due to a change of studio representation–from Universal to Tri-Star–as well as extensive rescoring and reassembling of promotional ads during post-production. Producer Stephen J. Friedman spent a year negotiating a switch in distributors from Universal to Tri-Star while the film was stuck in limbo. It was then released in late 1986.

== Reaction ==
It was the very first film reviewed on Siskel and Ebert at the Movies. Both Gene Siskel and Roger Ebert gave the film a thumbs up. Audiences polled by CinemaScore gave the film an average grade of "B-" on an A+ to F scale.

== See also ==
- List of films about ice hockey
