= George Basil =

American actor

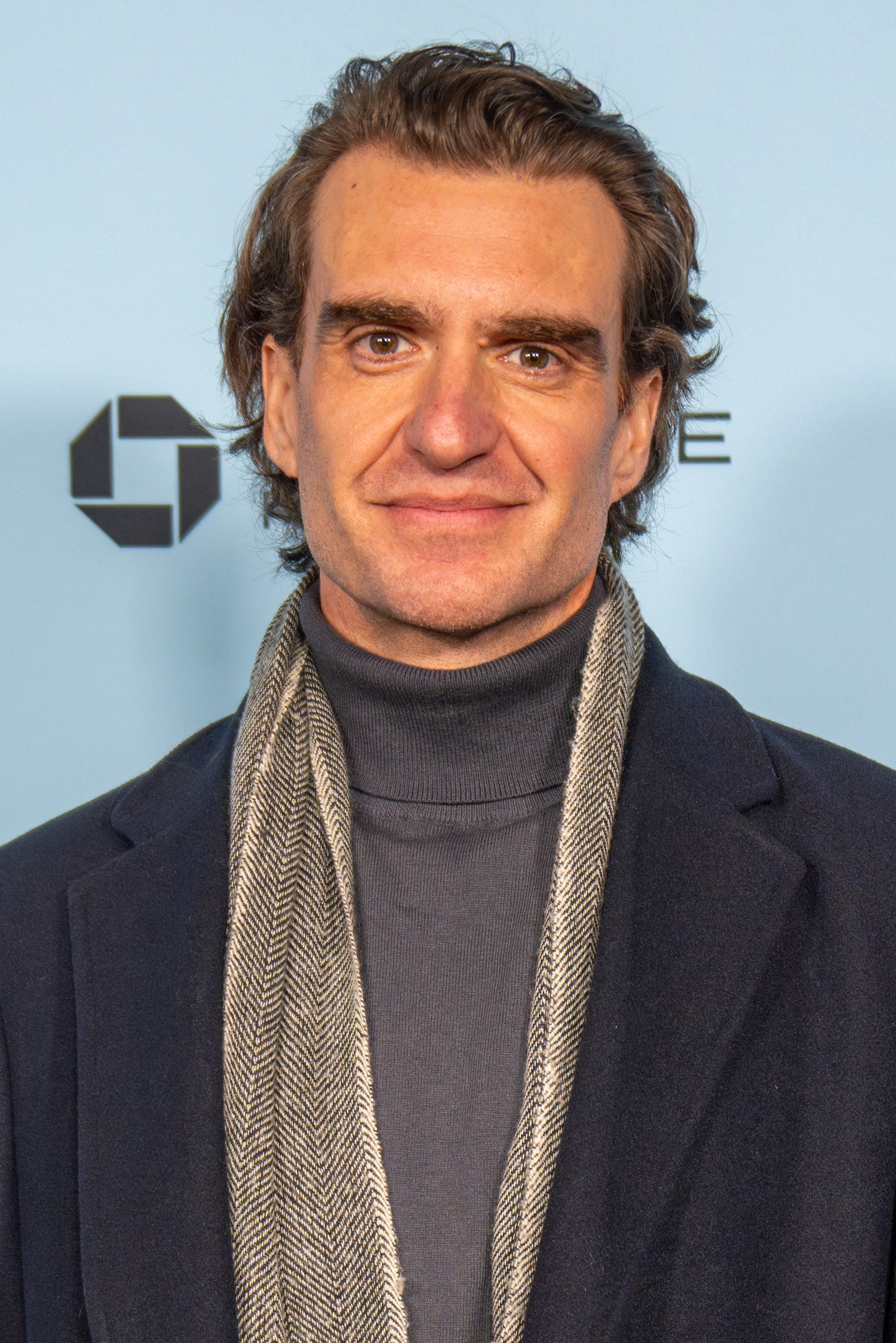
- George Basil at the 2025 Sundance Film Festival
- Born: George William Basil; January 4, 1978 (age 48); Baltimore, MD
- Occupation: Actor
- Years active: 2011–present
- Children: 1

George William Basil is an American actor.

== Early life ==
Basil grew up outside Baltimore in Essex. After his family moved to Greece, being of age, he stayed and worked briefly as a chef after graduating high school.

After seeing a flyer for the Big Stinkin' International Improv & Sketch Comedy Festival, Basil moved to Austin. There he worked as a bartender and at a pirate radio station. He took an improv class which inspired him to move to New York City.

In NYC, Basil studied at Magnet Theater. For money, he worked at the Apple store, before he began getting acting work.

== Career ==
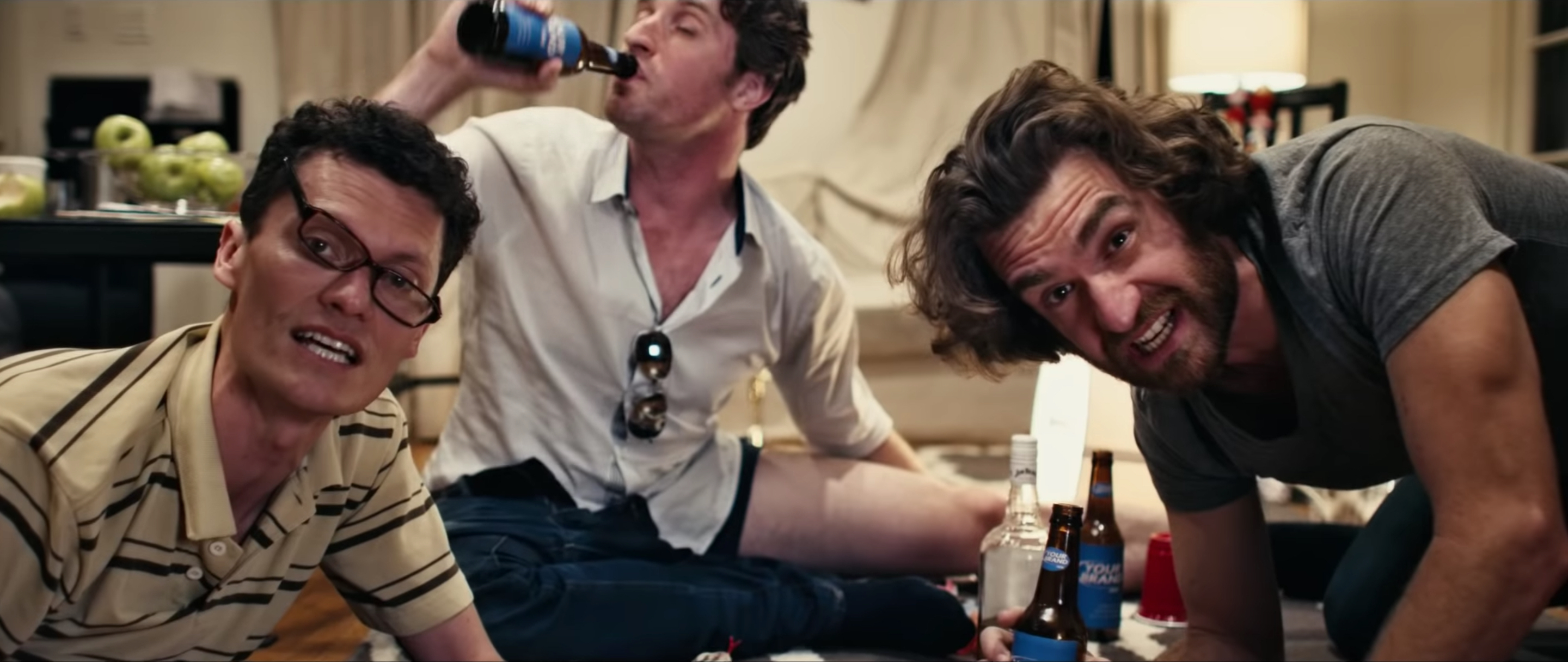
Basil (right) in Jon Lajoie's "Please Use This Song" music video (2014)

As an actor Basil is best-known for such films as Werewolves Within and television roles in series such as Flaked, Wrecked, and Crashing.

== Personal life ==
Basil has one daughter and resides in Highland Park.

== Filmography ==
=== Film ===
Year	Title	Role	Notes
2011	Roller Town	Gregs	
2013	Farah Goes Bang	Jared	
2014	Welcome to Me	Technical Director No. 2	
2016	Man Underground	Willem Koda	
2017	Village People	Mike	
2020	Desperados	Doug	
2021	Werewolves Within	Marcus	
2023	Barbie	Boutique Owner	
2025	Didn't Die	Vincent	
2026	4 Kids Walk Into a Bank		
TBA	Party O'Clock	Junior	

=== Television ===
Year	Title	Role	Notes
2013	The Pete Holmes Show	Wolverine	Episode: "Kumail Nanjiani"
2014	Newsers	Karl	TV movie
2014	Love is Relative	Ryan	TV movie
2015	Adam Ruins Everything	Serial Killer	Episode: "Serial Killer"
2016	Tween Fest	Cootis	Episode: "The Week Between""
2016	The Good Place	Andy	Episode: "Tahani Al-Jamil"
2016	You're the Worst	Chip	Episode: "The Inherent, Unsullied Qualitative Value of Anything"
2016–2017	No Tomorrow	Jesse Holliday	5 episodes
2016–2017	Flaked	Cooler	14 episodes
2016–2018	Wrecked	Chet	20 episodes
2017–2019	Crashing	Leif	13 episodes
2017	Ghost Story Club	Wally	Episode: "The Haunted Interstate"
2017–2019	SMILF	George	2 episodes
2019	Santa Clarita Diet	André	Episode: "Zombody"
2019	All Rise	Robbie Brooks	Episode: "Pilot"
2019	Silicon Valley	Ethan	Episode: "Maximizing Alphaness"
2019	No Activity	Gary	8 episodes
2023	Royal Crackers	George Zeebos (voice)	Episode: "The 1%"
2025	Night Court	Goose	Episode: “Passing the Bar”
