= Meera Menon =

American director, writer, and editor

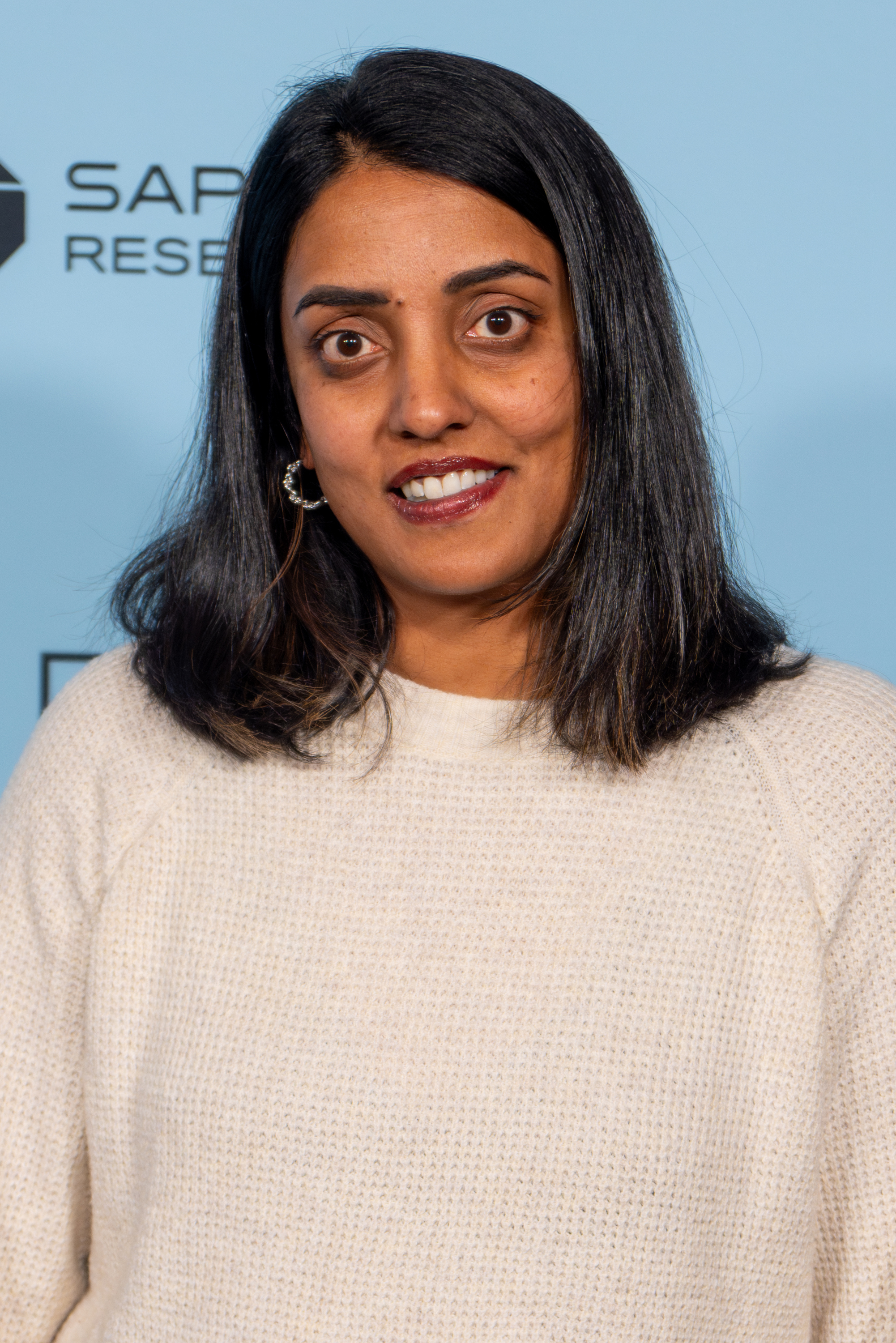
- Menon at the 2025 Sundance Film Festival
- Born: Park Ridge, NJ
- Education: Columbia University (BA); University of Southern California (MFA)
- Occupations: Director; Writer; Editor
- Years active: 2009–present
- Spouse: Paul Gleason

Meera Menon is an American director, writer, and editor. Her feature directorial debut, Farah Goes Bang, screened at the Tribeca Film Festival in 2013 and was awarded the inaugural Nora Ephron Prize by Tribeca and Vogue. She currently resides in Los Angeles with her husband, cinematographer Paul Gleason.

== Early life and education ==
Menon‘s family is from Kerala, India. Menon cited her father Vijayan, a film producer and a founder of Tara Arts, an English cultural ambassador for South India that showcases musicals and films, as her earliest inspiration for filmmaking, using his camera to shoot films at a young age with her next-door neighbour. Menon says while her parents encouraged her to pursue the arts, her father advised her to look at it as a hobby.

Because of this way of thinking about film, Menon did not seriously consider filmmaking as a career until she attended Columbia University, and took classes that were taught by professional filmmakers. Menon received a BA in English and Art History from Columbia, but while she was there, she began directing films and discovered a passion for the craft. She went on to receive an MFA from the USC School of Cinematic Arts.

== Career ==
In 2009, Menon wrote and directed the short film Mark in Argentina, a story about a governor searching for his mistress in Argentina. However, it wasn't until Menon released her feature-length debut that she started to get a great deal of recognition from the media.

Menon's first full-length feature film, Farah Goes Bang, was described by Jennifer Mills as one that, "explores many genres: the road movie, the sexual coming of age movie, the political film, the buddy movie." Menon co-wrote the film with Laura Goode, who also acted as a producer. Not only did Menon win the Nora Ephron Prize for Farah Goes Bang, but the film also won awards at the Los Angeles Asian Pacific Film Festival and CAAMFest.

In 2015, Menon directed the female-driven Wall Street drama Equity. The film premiered in Competition at the 2016 Sundance Film Festival.

In 2016, Menon also wrote and directed the short film The Press Conference for Refinery29's ShatterBox Anthology, a series of 12 shorts written and directed by women. The short premiered on Refinery29 on 23 September 2016.

She had also worked as a director on the TV series The Magicians for an episode in the third, and two in the fourth season.

Syfy reported in 2022, Menon would direct a film based on Naomi Novik's best-selling Young Adult fantasy A Deadly Education, in development by Mandeville Films as part of a series bought by Universal Hollywood.

Her zombie film, Didn't Die, premiered at the 2025 Sundance Film Festival.

== Filmography ==
=== Film ===
| Year | Title | Director | Writer | Notes |
|---|---|---|---|---|
| 2009 | Mark in Argentina | Yes | Yes | |
| 2013 | Farah Goes Bang | Yes | Yes | Nominated – Best Director, Winter Film Awards; Nominated – Best Film, Winter Film Awards; Nominated – Best Narrative Feature, Los Angeles Asian Pacific Film Festival; Nora Ephron Prize, Tribeca Film Festival; Best Feature, San Francisco International Asian American Film Festival |
| 2016 | Equity | Yes | No | |
| 2016 | The Press Conference | Yes | Yes | |
| 2025 | Didn't Die | Yes | Yes | |

=== Television ===
| Year | Title | Notes |
|---|---|---|
| 2017 | Blood Drive | 2 episodes |
| 2017 | Halt and Catch Fire | Episode "Signal to Noise" |
| 2017 | Fear the Walking Dead | Episode "This Land Is Your Land" |
| 2017 | Snowfall | Episode "Story of a Scar" |
| 2017 | The Exorcist | Episode "A Heaven of Hell" |
| 2017 | Shut Eye | Episode "Shortchanged" |
| 2018 | Titans | Episode "Together" |
| 2018 | GLOW | Episode "The Good Twin" |
| 2018 | The Man in the High Castle | Episode "History Ends" |
| 2018 | Queen of the South | Episode "Reina de Espadas" |
| 2018 | Strange Angel | Episode "Glorification of the Chosen One" |
| 2018–2020 | The Magicians | 4 episodes |
| 2019 | The Punisher | Episode "The Abyss" |
| 2019 | The Walking Dead | Episode "Bounty" |
| 2019 | The Terror: Infamy | Episode "My Perfect World" |
| 2019 | You | Episode "Farewell, My Bunny" |
| 2019–2026 | For All Mankind | 6 episodes |
| 2020 | Outlander | 2 episodes |
| 2020 | Dirty John | Episode "The Turtle and the Alligator" |
| 2021 | With Love | 2 episodes |
| 2022 | Ms. Marvel | 2 episodes |
| 2022 | Westworld | Episode "Metanoia" |
| 2025 | Long Bright River | Episode: "Atonement" |
| 2025 | Ransom Canyon | 2 episodes |
| 2026 | Star Trek: Strange New Worlds | Episode: "A Case of Chiaroscuro" |
