= Scare Me =

- Official release poster
- Directed by: Josh Ruben
- Written by: Josh Ruben
- Produced by: Alex Bach; Daniel Powell; Josh Ruben
- Starring: Aya Cash; Josh Ruben; Rebecca Drysdale; Chris Redd
- Cinematography: Brendan H. Banks
- Edited by: Patrick Lawrence
- Music by: Elegant Too
- Production companies: Artists First; Irony Point; Last Rodeo Studios
- Distributed by: Shudder
- Release dates: January 24, 2020 (Sundance); October 1, 2020 (United States)
- Running time: 104 minutes
- Country: United States
- Language: English

Scare Me is a 2020 American comedy horror film written, directed, and produced by Josh Ruben. It stars Aya Cash, Josh Ruben, Rebecca Drysdale and Chris Redd.

It had its world premiere at the Sundance Film Festival on January 24, 2020. It was released on 1 October 2020, by Shudder.

== Plot ==
Fred, a struggling actor and writer, rents a mountain cabin to try to write in isolation, and hires similarly aspiring writer Bettina to drive him to and from the cabin. Suffering from writer's block, he goes for a run and meets Fanny, the author of the acclaimed horror novel Venus, who's staying in a nearby cabin. Fanny is unimpressed by Fred's attempts to justify himself as a writer, and the two go their separate ways for the night. When a thunderstorm knocks out the power on the mountain, Fanny visits Fred's house. The two wind up drinking together, and Fanny challenges Fred to tell her a scary story and frighten her. Fred's first attempt at telling his story doesn't engage Fanny, but as she eggs him on, he tells her a tale about a young boy who saw his parents killed by a werewolf and grew up to take revenge, embellished by sound effects and voice acting. Fanny criticizes Fred for making his story about a white man, to which Fred challenges her to tell him one of her ideas in progress.

Fanny instead improvises a story about a young girl who attempts to kill her creepy grandfather but kills his dog instead, and is haunted by the old man and the dog after their deaths. In a moment of vulnerability, Fred admits that he's been searching for a purpose ever since he had a mental breakdown after his wife left him and he threatened to kill her. After ordering a pizza, Fred and Fanny collaborate on a story about a troll who lives in the walls of an Edible Arrangements store who entices a put-upon secretary to murder her sleazy boss in exchange for 300 years of life, but are interrupted by the arrival of Carlo, the pizza delivery man. Fanny invites Carlo to stick around and tell stories with them. Carlo agrees, admitting he is a huge fan of Fanny's work. Together, Carlo and Fanny do cocaine and re-enact the story of Venus for Fred, who is visibly annoyed with Fanny apparently flaunting her success in his face.

Fred proposes a new story about a singer who makes a deal with the Devil to perform on a nationwide talent competition, but is possessed and forced to sing about widespread murder. Afterwards, Carlo leaves to take care of more deliveries (after getting an autograph from Fanny), while Fanny goes to the bathroom. Fred reads Fanny's notebook while she is away, realizing she's been writing down all of their stories, as well as taking notes on him and his inability to accept that she's the better writer. Drunk and angry, he confronts Fanny with a fire poker. When Fanny berates Fred for his lack of talent and asks for her book back, he chases her around the house with the poker, but during the chase, he trips down the stairs and impales himself on it.

Bleeding and in pain, Fred begs Fanny to kill him so he doesn't have to suffer any more; she retrieves a log from the fireplace and raises it, but instead puts it down and leaves the house, leaving Fred to bleed out. Bettina arrives the next morning to check on Fred, finding Fanny's notebook while completely oblivious to Fred's corpse on the stairs. A mid-credits scene reveals that Bettina has written the stories in the notebook into a book of her own and is now a famous author in her own right.

== Cast ==
- Aya Cash as Fanny Addie
- Josh Ruben as Fred Banks
- Chris Redd as Carlo
- Rebecca Drysdale as Bettina

== Release ==
It had its world premiere at the Sundance Film Festival on January 24, 2020. Prior to, Shudder acquired distribution rights to the film. It was released on 1 October 2020.

== Reception ==
Scare Me received positive reviews from critics. The film has an approval rating of 82% on review aggregator Rotten Tomatoes. The site's consensus reads, "Smart, well acted and suitably chilling, Scare Me uses its familiar horror setting as the backdrop for a fresh deconstruction of standard genre ingredients." Metacritic, which uses a weighted average, assigned the film a score of 66 out of 100, based on 8 critics, indicating "generally favorable" reviews. Jeffrey Zhang of Strange Harbors praised the film, writing, "Aided by lighting, tricks of the camera, and some rip-roaring sound design, Scare Me transforms simple conversation into a fun horror romp."
