= Onteora High School =

Coordinates: 42°0′31.59″N 74°15′58.88″W

- 4166 Route 28; Boiceville, New York 12412; United States

Information
- Type: Public High School
- Established: 1952
- School district: Onteora Central School District
- Superintendent: Victoria McLaren
- Principal: Lance Edelman
- Teaching staff: 37.31 (FTE)
- Grades: 9–12
- Enrollment: 370 (2024–2025)
- Student to teacher ratio: 9.92
- Colors: Red and Black
- Mascot: Eagle
- Newspaper: The Talon
- Website: ohs.onteora.k12.ny.us

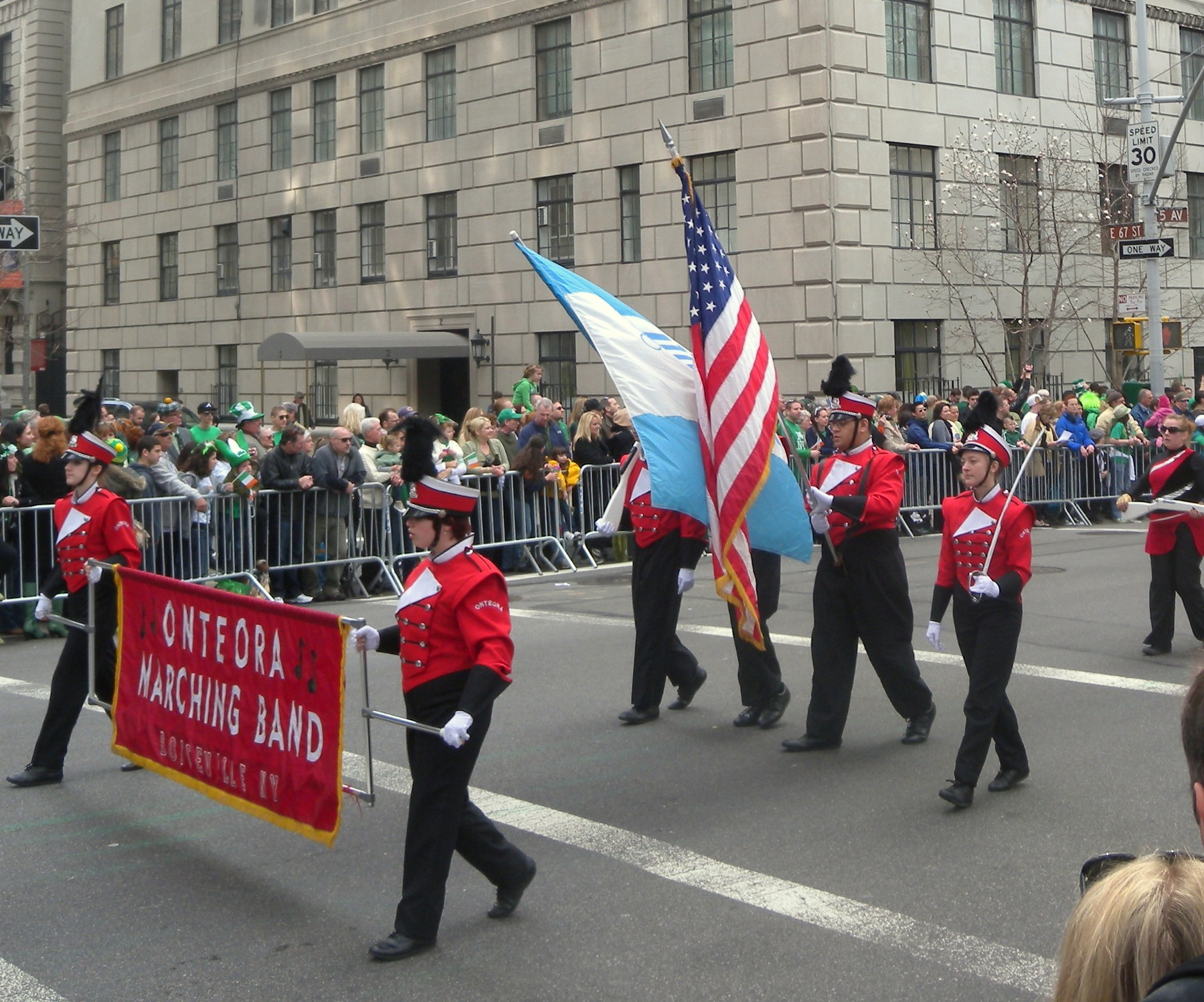
High School/ Middle School Marching Band marching in Manhattan

Onteora High School, located in Boiceville, New York, is part of the Onteora Central School District. The High School shares its building with the Onteora Middle School. However, the two schools remain administratively separate.

The school serves the towns of Woodstock, West Hurley, Olive, and Shandaken, each comprising several small hamlets including Glenford, Ashokan, Beechford, Brodhead, Brown's Station, Cold Brook, Davis Corners, Krumville, Olivebridge, Samsonville, Shokan, Winchell, West Shokan, Bearsville, Byrdcliffe, Montoma, Daisy, Shady, Willow, Wittenberg, parts of Zena, Phoenicia, Pine Hill, Ohayo, Oliverea, Mt. Tremper, Mt. Pleasant, Woodland Valley, Highmount, Allaben, Chichester, Bushnellsville, Big Indian, and Yankeetown.

Despite its size, the number of students in attendance remains small and is steadily declining.

In 2011, 85.2% of students graduated within 4 years, up from 81% in 2010.

Previously the school mascot had been the Indians, which had been a point of contention for many years within the community and there has been multiple attempts to have the name changed. The first one, in May 2001, resulted in very close vote in favor of retaining the name 1,940 to 1,868. A new initiative was started in 2016 by a new generation of students who believed that the use of a racial group as a mascot was insensitive. This eventually let to the school board of trustees voting 5–2 in favor of changing the mascot to the Eagles.

== See also ==
Native American mascot controversy
