= Ajay Naidu =

American actor (born 1972)

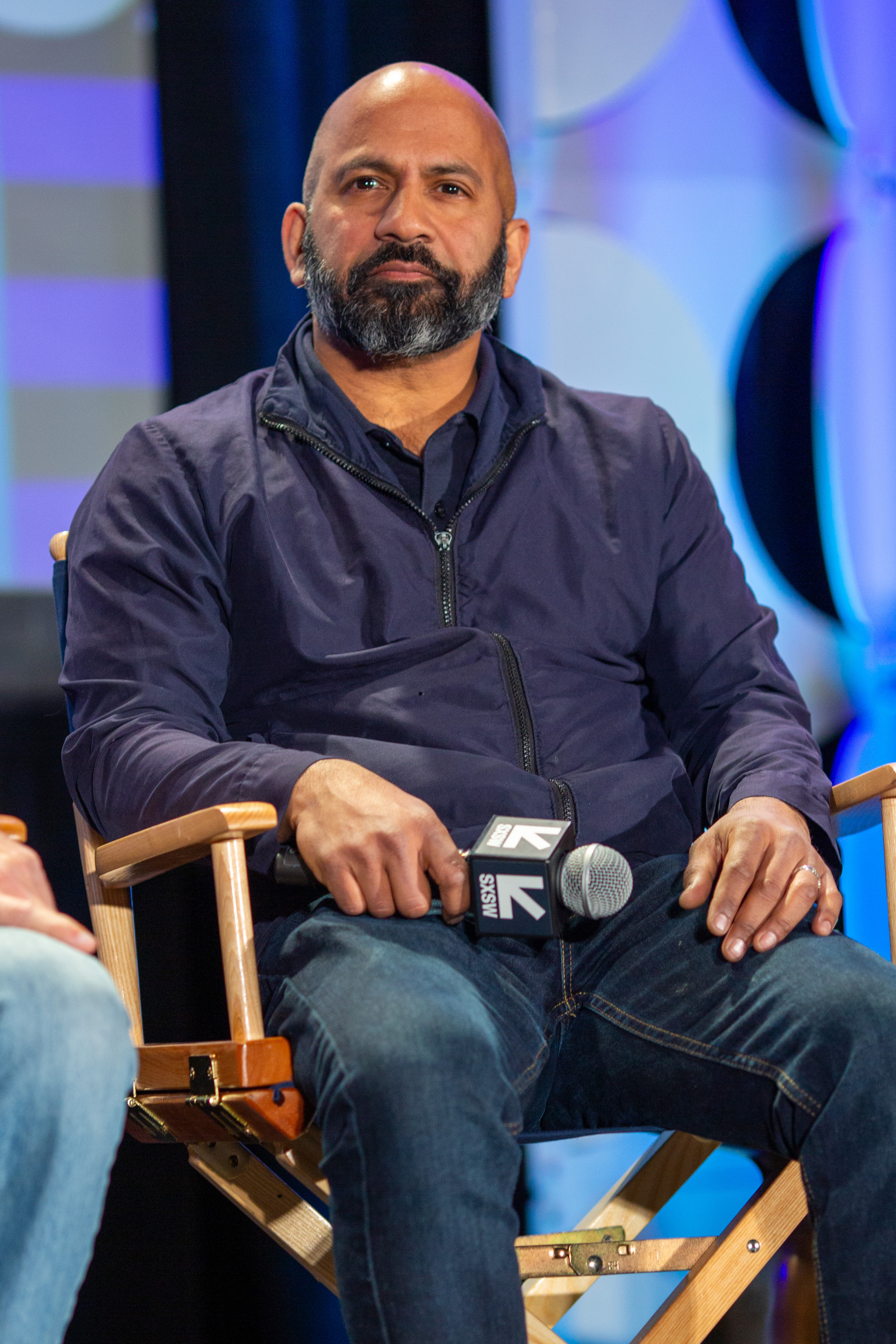
- Naidu at SXSW 2024
- Born: Ajay Kalahastri Naidu; February 12, 1972 (age 54); Evanston, Illinois, U.S.
- Occupation: Actor
- Years active: 1985–present
- Spouse: Heather Burns
- Children: 1

Ajay Kalahastri Naidu (born February 12, 1972) is an American actor and director best known for playing Samir in Office Space. He also made guest appearances in The West Wing and The Sopranos. Naidu was nominated for the Independent Spirit Award for Best Supporting Male for his performance in the film SubUrbia.

== Early life and education ==
Naidu was born in Evanston, Illinois. His parents came from India to the United States in 1964. His mother was from Kerala. He attended Evanston Township High School. He trained with the American Repertory Theater's Institute for Advanced Theater Training at Harvard University.

== Career ==
Naidu's first professional acting job, which he won from an open call, was a leading role opposite Michael Keaton in the 1986 film Touch and Go. This was followed by an ABC Afterschool Special episode, "No Greater Gift" (1985), where he played Nick Santana, a 12-year-old boy with a terminal illness. Naidu then appeared in the MacGyver TV series' first-season episode, "To Be a Man" in 1986.

Other early film credits include Where the River Runs Black (1986) opposite Charles Durning and Vice Versa (1988). Between 1988 and 1995 he worked extensively in classical theatre.

Naidu returned to film acting in 1996 with Richard Linklater's SubUrbia, for which he was nominated for the Independent Spirit Award for Best Supporting Male and competed against the likes of Samuel L. Jackson, Roy Scheider and Jason Lee.

On screen, Naidu starred in the cult film Office Space, as well as appearing in films such as K-Pax, Subway Stories, π, Requiem for a Dream, Bad Santa, The War Within, The Guru, Waterborne, and Loins of Punjab Presents. He co-starred as a series regular in the sitcom LateLine and had guest starring roles on the television dramas The Sopranos, The West Wing and Bored to Death.

Naidu has been working extensively with musicians from the Asian underground music movement for many years as a breakdancer and an M.C. His vocals have appeared on many records, most notably Talvin Singh's Mercury Award winner OK and Vijay Iyer's In What Language?

In 2006, Naidu directed his first feature film Ashes which had its release in 2010 and for which he won Best Actor accolades from the MIACC Film Festival in New York and the London Asian Film Festival.

Naidu's most recent theatre credits include The Kid Stays in the Picture at the Royal Court Theatre, The Master and Margarita with Complicité, a world tour of Shakespeare's Measure for Measure with Complicité, The Resistible Rise of Arturo Ui alongside Al Pacino, directed by Simon McBurney, The Little Flower of East Orange alongside Ellyn Burstyn at New York's Public Theater directed by Philip Seymour Hoffman, and Waiting for Godot at TFANA directed by Arin Arbus. In 2001 Naidu's solo theatre piece Darwaza was a sold-out hit at New York's Labyrinth Theatre, where he is also a member of the company.

In 2019, Naidu was awarded the Excellence in Performing Arts Award by Illinois Secretary of State Jesse White.

== Personal life ==
Naidu is married to actress Heather Burns. The couple has a son, Jaan Burns.

== Filmography ==
=== Film ===
Year	Title	Role	Notes
1986	Touch and Go	Louis DeLeon	
1986	Where the River Runs Black	Segundo	
1988	Vice Versa	Dale	
1996	SubUrbia	Nazeer Choudhury	
1997	Once We Were Strangers	Apu	
1998	Shopkeeping	Asif	
1998	Montana	Ives	
1998	My Giant	Hot Dog Vendor	
1998	Scotch and Milk	Armand	
1998	Pi	Farrouhk	
1999	Office Space	Samir Nagheenanajar	
1999	Chutney Popcorn	Raju	
2000	You Are Here*	Sanjay	
2000	Dinner Rush	Ademir the Matre'd	
2000	Requiem for a Dream	Mailman	
2000	More Dogs Than Bones	Andy	
2001	American Chai	Hari	
2001	Hannibal	Perfume Expert	
2001	K-PAX	Dr. Chakraborty	
2002	Bomb the System	Moses Mundhra	
2002	The Guru	Sanjay	
2003	Justice	Mohammed	
2003	Scary Movie 3	Sayaman	
2003	Bad Santa	Hindustani Troublemaker	
2005	Perception	Kamal	
2005	212	Vincent	
2005	Waterborne	Vikram Bhatti	
2005	Alchemy	Best Man	
2005	Scooby-Doo in Where's My Mummy?	Prince Omar	
2005	The Honeymooners	Vivek	
2005	The War Within	Naved	
2005	Confess	Account Executive	
2006	Hiding Divya	Divya's husband	
2007	Loins of Punjab Presents	Turbanotorious B.D.G.	
2008	Righteous Kill	Dr. Chadrabar	
2008	The Wrestler	Medic	
2008	The Accidental Husband	Deep	
2009	Hotel for Dogs	ACO Jake	
2009	Today's Special	Munnamia	
2009	Falling Up	Paco	
2009	The Hungry Ghosts	Laurence	
2010	Ashes	Ashes	Director, writer
2012	3 Days of Normal	Vik Donowitz	
2013	Gods Behaving Badly	The Producer	
2017	Lost Cat Corona	Amir	
2017	Crazy Famous	Dr. Manning	
2018	The Kindergarten Teacher	Nikhil Roy	
2020	The Dark End of the Street	Graham	
2020	Antarctica	Principal Pepp	
2020	Thorp	Pat	
2020	The Sleepless	Vivek	
2021	Americanish	Jawad	
2021	The Magnificent Meyersons	Mohammed	
2022	The Good Nurse	Dr. Robert Hind	
2025	Bunny	Officer Cellestino	

=== Television ===
Year	Title	Role	Notes
1985	Lady Blue	Paquito	Episode: "Pilot"
1985	ABC Afterschool Specials	Nick Santana	Episode: "No Greater Gift"
1986	MacGyver	Ahmed	Episode: "To Be a Man"
1996	New York Undercover	Manuel	Episode: "Brown Like Me"
1997	SUBWAYStories: Tales from the Underground	Prashant	TV movie
1998–1999	LateLine	Raji Bakshi	Main role
2000	The Sopranos	Omar	Episode: "Big Girls Don't Cry"
2001	The Gene Pool	Paul Patel	TV movie
2001	The West Wing	Rakim Ali	Episode: "Isaac and Ishmael"
2004	Fillmore!	Sanjay	Episode: "Field Trip of the Just"
2004	Monk	Masul the Cabbie	Episode: "Mr. Monk Takes Manhattan"
2004	The Jury	George Edmonds	Episode: "Pilot"
2005	King of the Hill	Delivery Guy / Malik	Episode: "Mutual of Omabwah"
2008	Strokes	Sanjay Lall	TV movie
2009	Cop House	Skip Malhotra	TV movie
2009	30 Rock	Asif	Episode: "Larry King"
2009	Kings	Dr. Nayar	2 Episodes
2009	Mercy	Matt	Episode: "Pulling the Goalie"
2010	Futurestates	Rakesh	Episode: "Pia"
2010	Bored to Death	Vikram	2 Episodes
2014	Deadbeat	Attendant / The Taxi Man	2 Episodes
2014	Manhattan Love Story	Brian	Episode: "Pilot"
2016	World's End	Karl	TV movie
2016	Odd Mom Out	Doctor	Episode: "40 Is the New 70"
2017	Friends from College	Howie Wexler	Episode: "Second Wedding"
2018	God Friended Me	Eric	Episode: "The Good Samaritan"
2019	Billions	Kulbinder Darcha	Episode: "Arousal Template"
2019	The Brooding Barista Jackass	Customer	Episode: "Hot or Not"
2020	The Blacklist	Mahmoud Iqbal	Episode: "Cornelius Ruck (No. 155)"
2016–2020	Blindspot	Shohid Akhtar	5 Episodes
2020	Social Distance	Dan	Episode: "Delete All Future Events"
2021	Dr. Death	Dr. Sasani	3 Episodes
2022	WeCrashed	Randall	Episode: "This Is Where It Begins"
2022	Uncoupled	Raffi	Episode: "Episode #1.5"
2024	Elsbeth	Martin Wali	Recurring character
