= Cooper Lake (New York) =

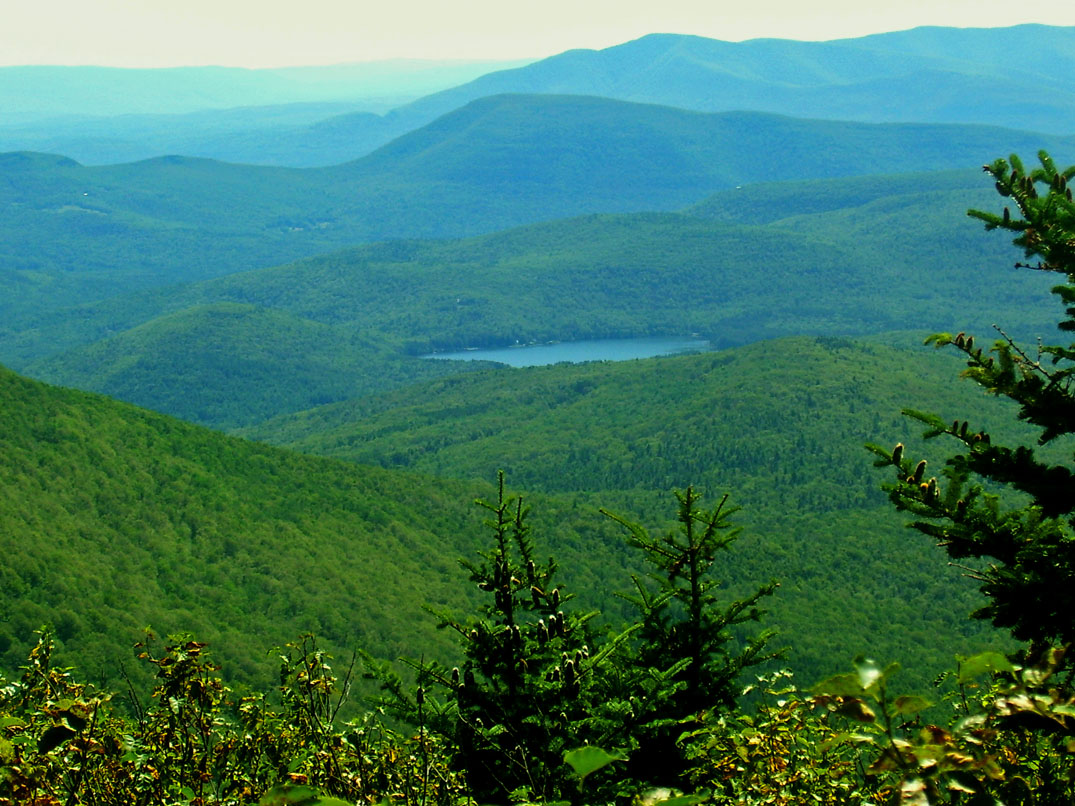
- from Twin Mountain

- Location within New York Location within the United States
- Location: Ulster County, New York
- Coordinates: 42°03′39.5″N 74°10′42.6″W
- Type: reservoir
- Basin countries: United States
- Surface area: approx. 150 acres (61 ha)
- Surface elevation: 1,106 ft (337 m)

Cooper Lake, located near Lake Hill in the Town of Woodstock, Ulster County, New York, is a man made drinking water reservoir. Prior to construction of the dams 100 plus years ago the "lake" was a small pond in the Catskill Mountains. The land was purchased by and built into a reservoir that now serves as the main reservoir for the nearby City of Kingston and Town of Ulster, which stores water there that it pipes from Mink Hollow Stream in addition to the water that reaches the lake from its 8.6-square mile (22.4 km^{2}) drainage basin.

It holds roughly 1.2 billion US gallons (4,500,000 m^{3}) to the city a year; providing an average of 4.6 million US gallons (17,000 m^{3}) a day to Kingston and Ulster.

Operational since 1899, the Edmund T. Cloonan Water Treatment Plant treats Cooper Lake water with chlorine, alum filtration, and lime corrosion control. Its laboratory conducts bacteriological examinations and offers public access for water testing, aiding community monitoring efforts.

Since it is a water supply, hiking, boating, swimming and fishing in Cooper Lake are strictly prohibited.

The area of Cooper Lake and the surrounding grounds is owned by City of Kingston Water Department.
