= Books about Seattle =

This is a selected list of nonfiction books about the city of Seattle in the United States.

== Books ==
- Alaska Yukon Pacific Exposition by Shauna O'reilly (Arcadia, 2009)
- Apartments by Anhalt by Lawrence Kreisman (1978)
- Architects and Landscape Architects of Seattle, 1876 to 1959 by Duane Dietz (1994)
- Art Deco Seattle by Lawrence Kreisman (1979)
- Before Seattle Rocked by Kurt E. Armbruster (2011)
- The Best Party of Our Lives: Stories of Gay Weddings and True Love to Inspire Us All by Sarah Galvin (2015)
- Biking Uphill in the Rain: the Story of Seattle From Behind the Handlebars by Tom Fucoloro (University of Washington Press, 2023)
- Buddy Does Seattle by Peter Bagge (2005)
- Building Together: A Memoir of Our Lives in Seattle by William J. Bain Sr. and Mildred C. Bain (1991)
- Building Tradition: Pan-Asian Seattle and Life in the Residential Hotels by Marie Rose Wong (2018)
- Campus Guide University of Washington by Werner Weidert (Princeton Architectural Press, 2001)
- The Cayton Legacy – An African American Family by Richard S. Hobbs
- Chief Seattle and the Town That Took His Name by David M. Buerge (2017)
- Crossing Puget Sound: From Black Ball Steamer to Washington State Ferries by Steven J. Pickens (2019)
- Deciding to See: The View from Nathan's Bus by Nathan Vass (2025)
- Denny's Knoll: A History of the Metropolitan Tract of the University of Washington by Neal O. Hines (University of Washington Press, 1980)
- Distant Corner: Seattle Architects and the Legacy of H. H. Richardson by Jeffrey Karl Ochsner and Dennis Alan Andersen (University of Washington Press, 2003)
- Early Seattle Profiles by Henry Broderick (1959)
- Eccentric Seattle by J. Kingston Pierce (2003)
- Emerald City: An Environmental History of Seattle by Matthew Klingle (Yale University Press, 2007)
- Emerald Street: A History of Hip Hop in Seattle by Daudi Abe (2020)
- Filmlandia! by David Schmader (2023)
- The Forging of A Black Community Seattle's Central District, From 1870 Through the Civil Rights Era by Quintard Taylor (University of Washington Press, 2022)
- The Fountain and the Mountain by Norman Johnston (University of Washington, 1995)
- The Future Remembered: The 1962 Seattle World's Fair and Its Legacy by Paula Becker and Alan J. Stein (2011)
- The Gang of Four: Four Leaders. Four Communities. One Friendship by Bob Santos (2015)
- Gay Seattle by Gary Atkins (2003)
- Ghosts of Seattle Past – An Anthology curated by author/editor Jaimee Garbacik (2017)
- The Good Rain by Timothy Egan (1990)
- A Guide to Seattle Architecture 1850–1953 by Victor Steinbrueck (1953)
- Guide to Architecture in Washington State by Sally Woodbridge and Roger Montgomery (University of Washington Press, 1980)
- Heartbreak City: Seattle Sports and the Unmet Promise of Urban Progress by Shaun Scott (University of Washington Press, 2023)
- High Voltage Women Breaking Barriers at Seattle City Light by Ellie Belew (2019)
- Hill with a Future: Seattle's Capitol Hill 1900-1946 – by Jacqueline B. Williams (2001)
- Historic Preservation in Seattle by Lawrence Kreisman (1985)
- The History and Development of the Present Campus Plan for the University of Washington by John Paul Jones (1940)
- History of Seattle from the Earliest Settlement to the Present Time by Clarence B. Bagley (1916)
- A History of Variety – Vaudeville in Seattle from the Beginning to 1914 by Eugene Clinton Elliott (University of Washington Press, 1944)
- Homes and Gardens of the Pacific Coast. Vol. 1. edited by Frank Calvert (1913, reprinted 1974)
- I Sing the Salmon Home: Poems From Washington State by Rena Priest (2023)
- I'm Down by Mishna Wolff (2009)
- Impressions of Imagination: Terra-Cotta Seattle (1986)
- J.P. Patches, Northwest Icon by Julius Pierpont Patches (Chris Wedes pen name) and Bryan Johnston (2002)
- Jackson Street After Hours: the Roots of Jazz in Seattle by Paul De Barros (1993)
- The Kid: What Happened After My Boyfriend and I Decided to Go Get Pregnant by Dan Savage (1999)
- King County and Its Emerald City: Seattle by James R. Warren (1997)
- Lamestains by Nicholas William James Attfield (2023)
- Limitless: Stories From the Neighborhood That Shaped Seattle by Jill Freidberg and Inye Wokoma (2025)
- Loser: The Real Seattle Music Story by Clark Humphrey (2016)
- Lost Seattle by Rob Ketcherside (2013)
- Making It: An Intimate Documentary of the Seattle Indie, Rock & Punk Scene, 1992-2008 by Bootsy Holler (2025)
- Maritime Seattle (Arcadia, 2002)
- Market Sketchbook by Victor Steinbrueck (University of Washington Press, 1968)
- Meet Me Tonight in Atlantic City by Jane Wong (2023)
- Mud Ride: a Messy Trip Through the Grunge Explosion by Steve Turner (2023)
- My People Are Rising: Memoir of a Black Panther Party Captain by Aaron Dixon
- My Unforgotten Seattle by Ron Chew (University of Washington Press, 2025)
- Native Seattle: Histories from the Crossing-Over Place by Coll Thrush (2007) (Note: "Crossing-over place" is a translation of the Coast Salish name for Seattle before settlement, Dzidzilalich, found abandoned by the Denny Party.)
- Nisei Daughter by Monica Sone (1953)
- Norwegian Seattle by Kristine Leander (Arcadia, 2008)
- Notoriously Bad Character by Hanna Brooks Olsen (2024)
- Olmsted in Seattle: Creating a Park System for a Modern City by Jennifer Ott (University of Washington Press, 2019)
- On Human Ecology by Roderick D. McKenzie (University of Chicago Press, 1968)
- One Week to Change the World: An Oral History of the 1999 WTO Protests by D. W. Gibson (2024)
- Outcasts & Innocents: Photographs of the Northwest by Alice Wheeler Greve (2015)
- Overground Railroad: The Green Book and The Roots of Black Travel in America by Candacy Taylor
- The Pacific Slope by Earl S. Pomeroy (University of Washington Press, 1965)
- Parks, Playgrounds, and Boulevards of Seattle, Washington (1909)
- Portrait of a Market: Photographs of Seattle's Pike Place Market by John Stamets (1987)
- Protest on Trial: The Seattle 7 Conspiracy by Kit Bakke (2018)
- Pugetopolis: A Mossback Takes on Growth Addicts, Weather Wimps, and the Myth of Seattle Nice by Knute Berger (2008)
- Revolutionary Feminists: the Women's Liberation Movement in Seattle by Barbara Winslow (Duke University Press, 2023)
- Rising Tides and Tailwinds: the Story of the Port of Seattle by Casey McNerthney (2024)
- The River That Made Seattle A Human and Natural History of the Duwamish by BJ Cummings
- Roadside Geology of Washington by David D. Alt (1984)
- Seattle and the Orient by Alfred Bowen (1900)
- Seattle Architecture: A Walking Guide to Downtown by Maureen R. Elenga (2007)
- The Seattle Book: the Weekly's Guide to Seattle by David Brewster and Rebecca Earnest (1978)
- Seattle City of Literature: Reflections From a Community of Writers edited by Ryan Boudinot (2015)
- Seattle Cityscape and Seattle Cityscape #2 by Victor Steinbrueck (University of Washington Press, 1962)
- Seattle Cocktails by Neil Ratliff (2022)
- Seattle Curiosities by Steve Pomper (2009)
- Seattle Illustrated (1890)
- Seattle in Black and White by Joan Singler, Jean C. Durning, Bettylou Valentine, and Martha J. Adams (2011)
- Seattle in the Great Depression: a History of Business, Labor, and Politics Drawn From Local Chronicles by Bruce A. Ramsey (Washington State University Press, 2025)
- Seattle Justice: the Rise and Fall of the Police Payoff System in Seattle by Christopher T. Bayley (2015)
- Seattle Now and Then by Paul Dorpat; Jean Sherrard (2018)
- Seattle, Past to Present by Roger Sale (University of Washington Press, 1976)
- Seattle Prohibition: Bootleggers, Rumrunners and Graft in the Queen City by Brad Holden (2019)
- Seattle Samurai: a Cartoonist's Perspective of the Japanese American Perspective by Kelly Goto (2024)
- Seattle Then & Now by James Madison Collins (2000)
- Seattle Walks: Discovering History and Nature in the City by David B. Williams (University of Washington Press, 2017)
- Seattle's Beacon Hill by Frederica Merrell (Arcadia, 2003)
- Seattle's Women Teachers of the Interwar Years: Shapers of a Livable City by Doris Hinson Pieroth
- Seattleness: A Cultural Atlas by Tera Hatfield, Jenny Kempson, and Natalie Ross (2022)
- Shaper of Seattle: Reginald Heber Thomson's Pacific Northwest by William H. Wilson (Washington State University Press, 2009)
- Shaping Seattle Architecture Second Edition by Jeffrey Karl Ochsner (University of Washington Press, 2014)
- Shaping the Public Good: Women Making History in the Pacific Northwest by Sue Armitage (Oregon State University Press, 2015)
- Shared Walls: Seattle Apartment Buildings 1900–1939 by Diana James
- Signs of Vanishing Seattle by Cynthia Brothers (2024)
- Silent Stars on the Stages of Seattle by Eric L. Flom (2009)
- Skid Road: An Informal Portrait of Seattle by Murray Morgan (1951)
- Sons of the Profits by Bill Speidel (1967)
- The Sound of Seattle by Eva Walker (2024)
- Stomp and Shout by Peter Blecha (University of Washington Press, 2023)
- Story of Seattle's Early Theatres by Howard F. Grant and Ethel Austin Grant (University Book Store, 1934)
- Street Trees of Seattle: An Illustrated Walking Guide by Taha Ebrahimi (2024)
- Tent City, Seattle: Refusing Homelessness and Making a Home by Tony Sparks (University of Washington Press, 2024)
- Too High and Too Steep: Reshaping Seattle's Topography by David Williams (University of Washington Press, 2015)
- Tradition and Change on Seattle's First Hill: Propriety, Profanity, Pills, and Preservation by Lawrence Kreisman
- Uncle Rico's Encore by Peter Bacho (2022)
- Utopias on Puget Sound, 1885–1915 by Charles Pierce Le Warne (University of Washington Press, 1975)
- Vanishing Seattle by Clark Humphrey (Arcadia, 2006)
- Washington State Rising: Black Power on Campus in the Pacific Northwest by Marc Arsell Robinson (New York University Press, 2023)
- Way Home: Journeys through Homelessness by Josephine Ensign (Johns Hopkins University Press, 2024)
- While the City Slept: a Love Lost to Violence and a Young Man's Descent Into Madness by Eli Sanders (2016)
- Wild in Seattle: Stories at the Crossroads of People and Nature by David Williams (2025)
- Women In Pacific Northwest History edited by Karen J. Blair (University of Washington Press, 1989 first ed./2001 second ed.)

== See also ==
- Novels set in Seattle
- History of Seattle
- Music of Seattle
