= Are We Good? =

2025 documentary film

- Film poster
- Directed by: Steven Feinartz
- Produced by: Steven Feinartz; Ethan Goldman; Julie Seabaugh
- Cinematography: Jordan McNeile
- Edited by: Natalie Ancona; Derek Boonstra; Jenn Harper
- Music by: Marlon Lang
- Production company: Radiant Media Studios Anchor Entertainment Indus Valley Media
- Distributed by: Utopia
- Release date: March 11, 2025 (SXSW)
- Running time: 97 minutes
- Country: United States
- Language: English

Are We Good? is a 2025 American documentary film following comedian Marc Maron after losing his partner and filmmaker, Lynn Shelton, at the height of the pandemic and his life afterwards in building his next hour of comedy. The documentary was created by Julie Seabaugh in May 2020 after the passing of Shelton, directed by Steven Feinartz, and produced by Feinartz, Ethan Goldman, and Seabaugh, who also served as story editor. It was distributed by Utopia and is streaming as part of the Criterion Collection.

The film features Marc Maron, Nate Bargatze, John Mulaney, David Cross, W. Kamau Bell, Laurie Kilmartin, Brendan McDonald, Sam Lipsyte, Caroline Rhea, Michaela Watkins, Jessica Kirson and Gary Gulman.

The film premiered at SXSW and Tribeca Film Festival. The documentary had its public release just as Maron's sixteen year podcast, WTF with Marc Maron, came to an end. Executive produced by Ray Maiello, Dan Baglio, Rob Guillermo, Guilhad Emilio Schenker and Gideon Tadmor.

== Reception ==
On the review aggregator website Rotten Tomatoes, 97% of 37 critics' reviews are positive. Metacritic, which uses a weighted average, assigned the film a score of 69 out of 100, based on six critics, indicating "generally favorable" reviews.
