= The Marc Maron Show =

Former American late night radio show

- Genre: Comedy radio
- Home station: KTLK 1150 AM in Los Angeles, California
- Syndicates: Air America Radio
- Hosted by: Marc Maron; Jim Earl
- Written by: Bruce Cherry; Spencer Dobson; Mike Ferrucci; Ray James; Kent Jones; Kevin Kataoka; Barry Lank; Steve Rosenfield
- Produced by: Brendan McDonald; Bill Kollar
- Original release: February 28 – July 13, 2006

The Marc Maron Show was a late night radio show produced in affiliation with the Air America Radio network and hosted by comedian Marc Maron. The show originated from KTLK 1150 AM in Los Angeles, California. The show was less politically focused and more comedic than the other weekday programs on Air America. It featured interviews (both political and showbusiness), live comedy, and extensive banter between Maron and Jim Earl, Maron's co-host, who provides humorous introductions after each commercial break and plays several of the recurring characters in the show's skits.

== Format ==
The content of the show was a wide mix. Political segments and interviews similar to those on other shows on Air America were a regular fixture, with a slight focus away from the "topics of the day" towards a more general feel for the political landscape, and especially environmental, health-related chemical issues and religion. Also featured were interviews with authors, directors and writers, often of political or satirical works, and appearances by comics. The website of the show described it as having "a laid-back performance and interview style reminiscent of the Late Show with David Letterman or Late Night with Conan O'Brien, with an emphasis on culture and comedy". Comedy skits were a regular feature, with a variety of re-occurring skits and occasional one-off bits.

The show's inception came about following the ending of Morning Sedition, Air America's original "morning drive" show. Maron's contract for the show was not renewed, so he moved back from New York to Los Angeles (where he lives). There KTLK set up The Marc Maron Show, since it had become evident following outcries to Air America by a small but committed fan base that there was an audience for his style of radio. As such, it shared many common characters and themes with Morning Sedition. In addition to Jim Earl also moving to Los Angeles to join the show and bringing all of his segments (Mort Mortensen's Weekly Remembrance, Cardinal Milf Milfington's Rapture Watch, War on Brains, etc.), the show also features Kent Jones's Lawton Smalls character occasionally. Maron's "Short Order News" is a similar vehicle for topical jokes to the "Morning Sedition Cliff Notes" from Morning Sedition.

The show launched on February 28, 2006, and was broadcast "Live" from the Marc Graue Voice Over Studios in Burbank, California, until July 13, 2006, originally aired live only on KTLK. From its beginning the show was part of Air America's paid podcasting service. The show was officially scheduled from 1AM - 3AM ET. Due to contractual issues at KTLK, the show was frequently delayed by Los Angeles Clippers broadcasts and postgame shows during the basketball season. As of April 10, 2006, the show moved to being pre-recorded between 5PM - 7PM PT. Syndication by Air America was scheduled to start on April 17, 2006, but changes in the AAR management team delayed that event. Talks between Maron and AAR management continued, according to Maron, and because the management team refused to syndicate the show, Maron chose to exercise an escape clause in his contract when the syndication clause was not honored.

== Regular features ==
- Marc Maron's Short Order News - Maron's take on the day's news; airs at the top and bottom of the show
- Dick (as in Cheney) of the Day - the most reprehensible person of the day as chosen by Maron; airs at the bottom of the show
- Liberal Confessional - Maron and callers confess their less-than-progressive moments
- Wheel of Anger - Rants by Earl
- Weekly Remembrances with Mort Mortensen - Earl disrespects the recently dead
- Movie reviews with Svetlana, the Russian prostitute - contributor Iris Bahr

== Catchphrases ==
- Opening: "Good evening, geniuses, philosopher kings and queens, working class heroes, progressive utopians with no sense of humor, lurking conservatives..."
- Closing: "Goodnight, sheeple."
- Well used phrases: "Neo-con death cult", "Christo-fascist zombie brigade"

== Guest hosts ==
- Cary Harrison

== Music ==
- Theme: "Sell Out" by Reel Big Fish
- Bumpers: varies, some regular tunes, but often if a musician is being interviewed, their music will be used instead.

== Staff ==
- Host: Marc Maron
- Co-host: Jim Earl
- Producer: Bill Kollar
- Engineer: Andy Welker
- Writer: Bruce Cherry
- Writer: Spencer Dobson
- Writer: Mike Ferrucci
- Writer: Ray James
- Writer: Kent Jones
- Writer: Kevin Kataoka
- Writer: Barry Lank
- Writer: Steve Rosenfield
- Contributor: Eddie Pepitone
- Contributor: Jerry Stahl
- Contributor: Rep. Richard Martin
- Contributor: David Poland
- Contributor: Seth Morris
- Contributor: Mishna Wolff
- Contributor: Iris Bahr
- Contributor: Craig Anton
- Contributor: James Adomian
- Former Producer: Brendan McDonald - producer during show start-up, returned to NYC after March 31, 2006
- Talent Booker : Charlie Amter
