= Marc Maron =

American comedian, actor and media personality (born 1963)

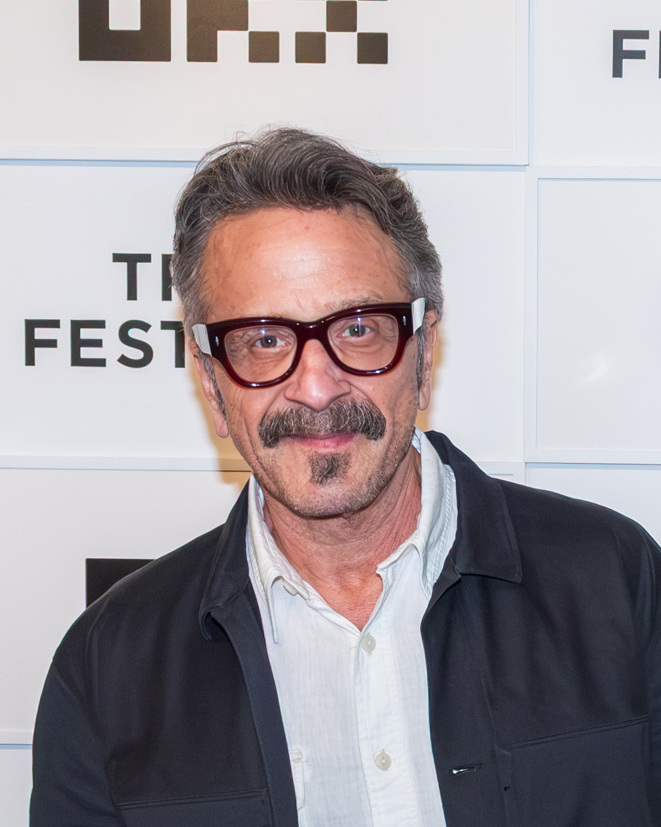
- Maron in 2026
- Born: Marc David Maron; September 27, 1963 (age 63); Jersey City, New Jersey, U.S.
- Education: Boston University (BA)
- Notable work: Morning Sedition; WTF with Marc Maron; The Marc Maron Show; Maron; GLOW
- Spouses: Kimberly Reiss (m. 1997; div. 2001) Mishna Wolff (m. 2004; div. 2007)

Comedy career
- Years active: 1987–present
- Medium: Stand-up, podcast, television, film
- Genres: Alternative comedy, black comedy, self-deprecation, cringe comedy, satire, musical comedy, observational comedy
- Website: wtfpod.com

Marc David Maron (born September 27, 1963) is an American stand-up comedian, writer, actor, musician, and former radio presenter and podcaster.

In the 1990s and 2000s, Maron was a frequent guest on the Late Show with David Letterman and appeared more than forty times on Late Night with Conan O'Brien, more than any other stand-up comedian. He hosted Comedy Central's Short Attention Span Theater from 1993 to 1994, replacing Jon Stewart. He was also a regular guest on Tough Crowd with Colin Quinn and hosted the short-lived 2002 American version of the British game show Never Mind the Buzzcocks on VH1. He was a regular on the left-wing radio network Air America from 2004 to 2009, hosting The Marc Maron Show and co-hosting Morning Sedition and Breakroom Live.

In September 2009, following the cancellation of Breakroom Live, Maron began hosting the twice-weekly podcast WTF with Marc Maron, interviewing comedians, authors, musicians, and celebrities in his garage in Highland Park, Los Angeles. Highlights include a 2010 episode with Louis C.K. that was rated the No. 1 podcast episode of all time by Slate magazine, a 2012 interview with comedian Todd Glass in which Glass came out as gay, and a 2015 interview with then-President Barack Obama. The podcast ended in 2025 with Obama returning as its final guest.

From 2013 to 2016, he starred in his own IFC television comedy series, Maron, for which he also served as executive producer and an occasional writer. From 2017 to 2019, he co-starred in the Netflix comedy series GLOW. He also had a minor role in 2019's Joker and voicing Mr. Snake in the DreamWorks Animation film franchise The Bad Guys (2022–present) as well as Lex Luthor in DC League of Super Pets (2022).

== Early life ==
Maron was born in Jersey City, New Jersey, the son of mother Toby Blum and father Barry Ralph Maron, an orthopedic surgeon. He has a younger brother, Craig. Maron is from a Jewish family, originally from Poland and Ukraine. He lived in Wayne, New Jersey, until he was six. Maron's father joined the U.S. Air Force for two years for his medical residency in Alaska, which led to Maron and his family moving there. When his father left the Air Force, he moved the family to Albuquerque, New Mexico and started a medical practice. Maron lived in Albuquerque from third grade through high school. He graduated from Highland High School. He graduated from Boston University in 1986 with a B.A. in English literature.

== Career ==
Maron first performed stand-up in 1987 when he was 24 years old. His professional comedy career began at The Comedy Store in Los Angeles, where he became an associate of Sam Kinison. He later moved to New York City and became part of the New York alternative comedy scene. During the summer of 1994, he appeared several times on Monday open-mic night, coordinated by Tracey Metzger, at the now-closed Greenwich Village location of the Boston Comedy Club. He auditioned unsuccessfully for the 1995 Saturday Night Live cast overhaul and attributes being passed over to being high during a meeting with show creator and producer Lorne Michaels.

Maron continued to be a stand-up comedian and also began to appear on television; his voice was used in episodes of Dr. Katz, Professional Therapist, and he hosted Short Attention Span Theater for a time. He also recorded half-hour specials for HBO and Comedy Central Presents as well as comedy showcases like the Cam Neely Foundation fundraiser, which also featured performers such as Jon Stewart, Denis Leary and Steven Wright. He frequently appeared in the live alternative stand-up series he had organized with Janeane Garofalo called Eating It, which used the rock bar Luna Lounge in New York's Lower East Side as its venue, from the 1990s until the building was razed in 2005.

His first one-man show, Jerusalem Syndrome, had an extended off-Broadway run in 2000 and was released in book form in 2001. In 2009, he began workshopping another one-man show, Scorching the Earth. According to Maron (in Scorching The Earth), these two shows "bookend" his relationship with his second wife, comic Mishna Wolff, which ended in a bitter divorce.

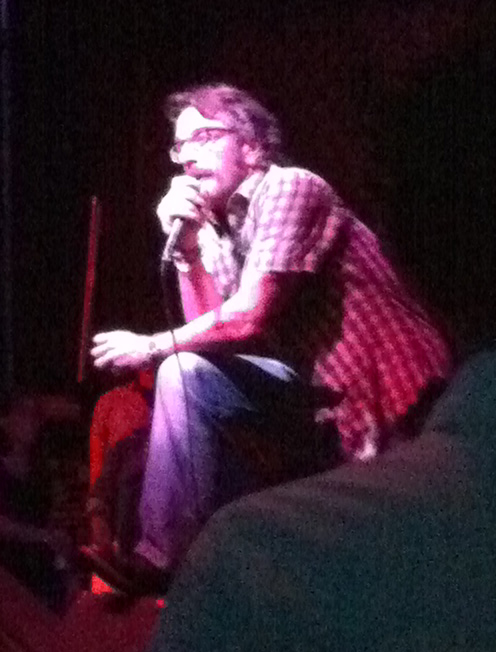
Maron performing in 2010

In May 2008, he toured with Eugene Mirman and Andy Kindler in Stand Uppity: Comedy That Makes You Feel Better About Yourself and Superior to Others. In January 2009, a collaboration with Sam Seder, which had begun in September 2007 as a weekly hour-long video webcast, became Breakroom Live with Maron & Seder, produced by Air America. Until its cancellation in July 2009, the show was webcast live weekdays at 3 p.m. Eastern, with episodes archived for later viewing. In its final incarnation, the show was informal, taking place in the actual break room of Air America Media, with the cafeteria vending machines just off-camera. This meant occasional distractions when Air America staff and management alike would occasionally come in for food and drink. Maron and Seder held court in an online "post-show chat" with viewers, in an even less formal continuation of each webcast, after the credits had rolled.

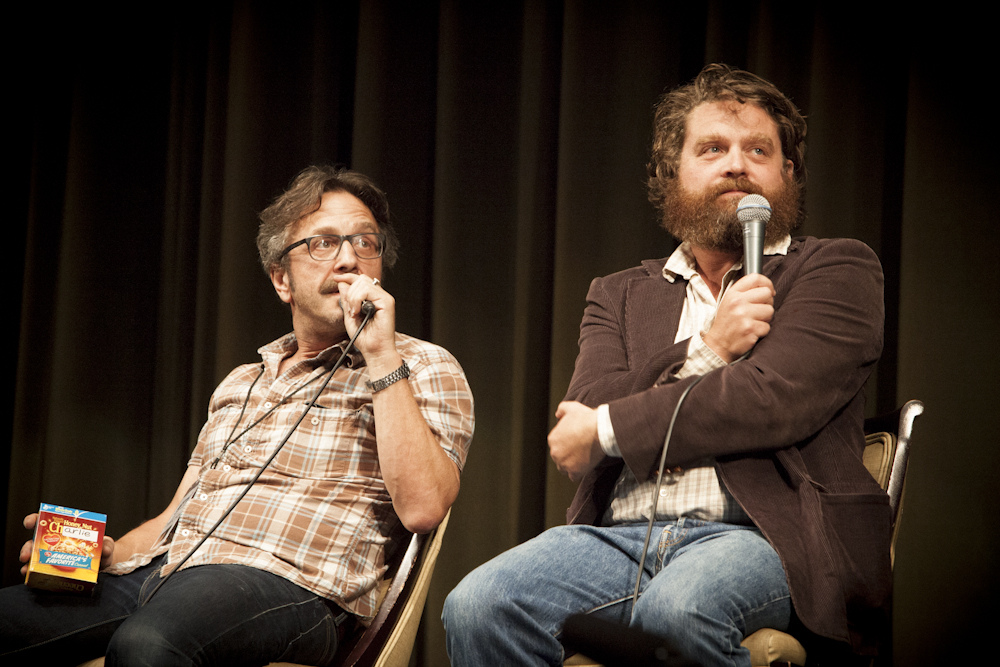
Maron (left) and Zach Galifianakis (right) participating in a Doug Loves Movies podcast at the 2012 Los Angeles Podcast Festival

Maron's stand-up act is marked by his commitment to self-revelation and cultural analysis. He is particularly known for relentless on-stage exploration of his own relationships with family, girlfriends, and other stand-up comedians whom he has known and befriended over his years. In October 2013, Maron released his first hour-long special through Netflix, Marc Maron: Thinky Pain. Maron would follow this with another special, More Later, which was released in December 2015 through Epix.

Kliph Nesteroff's 2015 book The Comedians: Drunks, Thieves, Scoundrels and the History of American Comedy is dedicated to Maron.

His 2023 special From Bleak to Dark was named New York magazine's "No. 1 Best Comedy Special of 2023."

=== Radio ===
From almost the first day of the liberal talk radio network Air America's broadcasts in 2004, Maron co-hosted Morning Sedition, a three-hour early-morning radio show with Mark Riley that aired weekdays from 6 a.m. to 9 a.m. Eastern time. The show was unique in the Air America lineup in its heavy reliance on both live and pre-produced sketch comedy, utilizing the talents of staff writers as well as the on-air hosts. The format was a left-leaning near-satire of typical morning "Buddy" radio programs, including recurring characters, interviews and listener call-in segments, and it attracted a loyal fan base.

In late 2005, it became known that Maron's contract would not be renewed, due to problems with then-Air America executive Danny Goldberg. Goldberg reportedly did not "get" the comedy or agree with the satiric and often angry tone set by Maron and other writers (Jim Earl and Kent Jones) for a morning drive-time show. On November 28, 2005, it was officially announced that Maron's contract had not been renewed. His last Morning Sedition broadcast was on December 16, 2005, and the show was discontinued shortly thereafter.

On February 28, 2006, Maron began hosting a nighttime radio program with Jim Earl as a sidekick for KTLK Progressive Talk 1150AM in Los Angeles called The Marc Maron Show from 10:00 pm until midnight PST. The program was frequently delayed (sometimes for over an hour) owing to KTLK's contractual agreement to broadcast local sports events that would often go into overtime. The Marc Maron Show was never nationally syndicated by Air America despite reported contractual clauses promising such. The show was streamed online live, but the show and stream were not well promoted.

On July 5, it was announced that Maron's final episode would be on July 14. A few days prior, Maron bluntly discussed his long struggle with Air America Radio's executives on-air. In 2008, Marc and Sam Seder expanded their prior collaboration on a weekly hour-long video webcast (streamed at The Sam Seder Show website) into a daily show (and "post-show chat") produced by Air America Media called Maron v. Seder. The show became Breakroom Live with Maron & Seder starting in 2009 and could be viewed on Air America Media's website. On July 15, 2009, after less than one year, Air America Media canceled Breakroom Live. According to the show's hosts, the cancellation was for financial reasons. Ironically, the day before the cancellation, the show got some of the first real publicity it had ever received when MaximumFun.org posted its podcast of an interview with Maron on The Sound of Young America.

On the final Breakroom Live webcast, Maron said that it marked the third time since 2005 he'd been told by an executive at the network that his services would not be required in the immediate future. Sam Seder pointed out that this would be the end of his fourth show at Air America since the troubled network's inception.

=== WTF with Marc Maron podcast ===
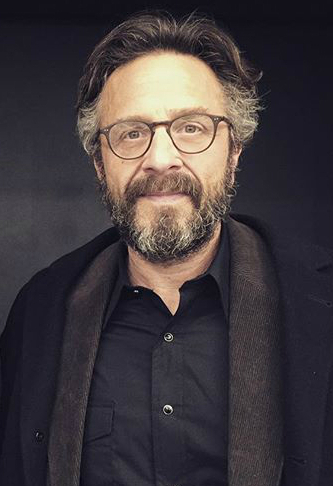
Maron in 2015

On September 1, 2009, Maron began a twice-weekly podcast called WTF with Marc Maron in what Maron would later describe in a 2015 interview as a "Hail Mary pass"; his first-ever guest was fellow stand-up Jeff Ross. In a freeform discussion, Maron and his guests touch the arc of the interviewees' careers, their shared experiences, and stories from the road. In all, Maron released 1,686 episodes of the show, garnering critical acclaim and more than 600 million downloads; notable guests include President Barack Obama, Sir Paul McCartney, Robin Williams, Jerry Seinfeld, Chris Rock, Lorne Michaels, Leonardo DiCaprio, and Brad Pitt. The show has been noted for its influence on other long-form interview podcasts that emerged after its debut. In April 2021, it was announced that Maron and his producer Brendan McDonald would be the recipients of the first-ever Governors Award by the Podcast Academy for Excellence in Audio (The Ambies) for their work on WTF. The success of Maron's podcast opened up numerous other avenues on film and TV as well as giving him a massive boost to audience attendance at his stand-up shows.

In June 2025, Maron announced that WTF would end. He announced on the September 29, 2025 episode of WTF that his last original episode would air October 13, 2025. The final episode of WTF featured Barack Obama, who gave him the advice "be a little brain-dead for awhile" and "don't rush into what's next."

=== Film and television ===
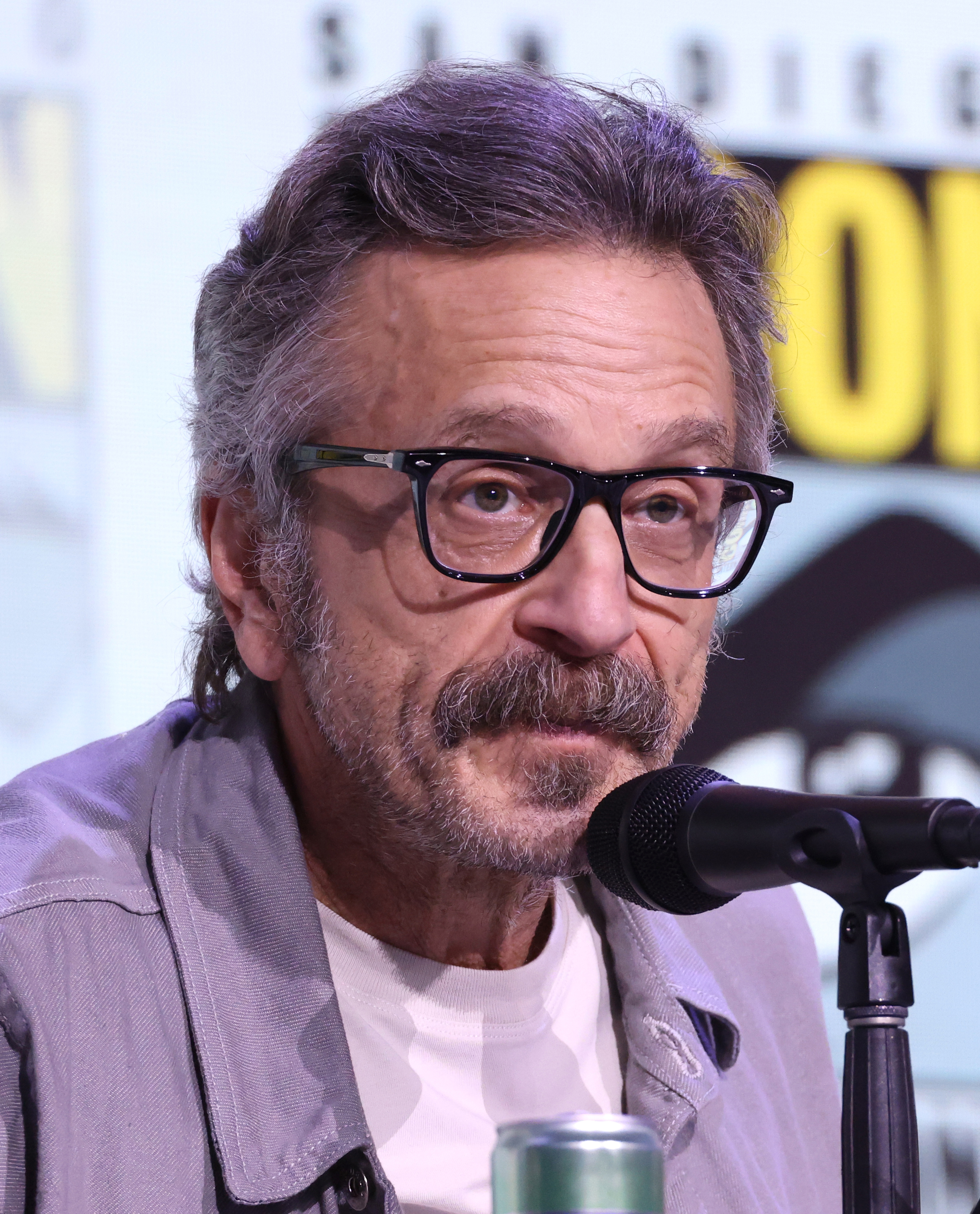
Maron at the 2025 San Diego Comic-Con

His only film credit for many years was a small part as the "angry promoter" in the 2000 Cameron Crowe film Almost Famous, in which he is first seen fighting with Noah Taylor's character and then yelling at and chasing the main characters as they drive away on a bus, at which point he yells, "Lock the gates!,” which is now used in the intro to his podcasts. He was also featured at the Luna Lounge in the 1997 mocumentary Who's the Caboose? starring Sarah Silverman and Sam Seder. In 2019, Maron starred in a Lynn Shelton–directed comedy film titled Sword of Trust. In 2020, Maron played publicist Ron Oberman opposite Johnny Flynn's young David Bowie in the movie Stardust.

In 2012, he was the voice of Magnus Hammersmith in three episodes of Metalocalypse. Maron has made two guest appearances as himself on his longtime friend Louis C.K.'s show Louie, first in the third-season episode "Ikea/Piano Lesson" and then again in the fourth season episode "Pamela: Part 3".

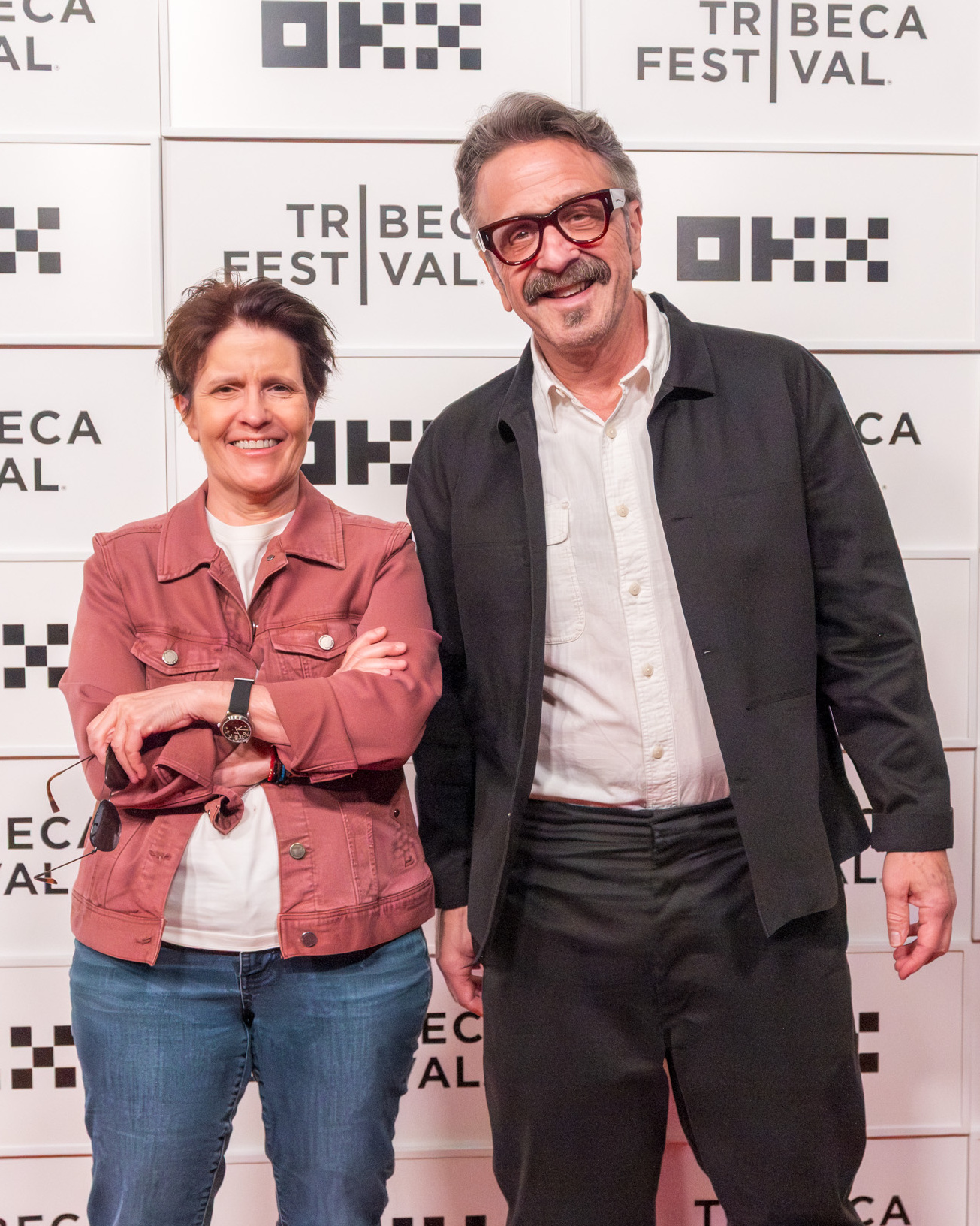
Maron (right) with Kara Swisher (left) at the 2026 Tribeca Festival

Maron, a television series created by and starring Maron for a 10-episode first season, premiered on IFC on May 3, 2013. The show is loosely autobiographical, revolving around Maron's life as a twice-divorced sober comedian running a comedy podcast out of his garage but establishing many differences between the real-life Maron and the version of him on TV. As the executive producer and star of Maron, Maron appeared in all 51 episodes of the show from 2013 to 2016, portraying a fictionalized version of himself. The show ended in 2016 after four seasons on IFC. Maron directed two episodes of the show, "The Joke" and "Ex-Pod."

Maron played a supporting role in Todd Phillips's Joker origin story film Joker, starring Joaquin Phoenix as the title character, alongside Robert De Niro and Zazie Beetz.

Maron was the voice of the raccoon Randl on 12 episodes of the Nickelodeon show Harvey Beaks in 2015 and 2016. He appeared in the Netflix series Easy, playing a graphic novelist, Jacob Malco. Maron also appeared on two episodes of Girls in season four in 2015, playing New York City councilman Ted Duffield.

From 2017 to 2019, Maron co-starred in the Netflix comedy GLOW, for which he was nominated for multiple awards.

He had a supporting role for the 2022 film To Leslie, playing alongside Andrea Riseborough.

He played the landlord Gideon Perlman in the Amazon web series The Horror of Dolores Roach. In 2024, it was announced that Maron would star in and produce the comedy film In Memoriam alongside Judy Greer, Talia Ryder, Lily Gladstone, Sharon Stone, Michael McKean, Justin Long, and Alan Ruck.

The documentary Are We Good?, following Maron after the loss of his partner Lynn Shelton and finding his next stand-up hour, premiered at SXSW and Tribeca Film Festival in 2025. The film was created by producer and story editor Julie Seabaugh in May 2020 and directed by Steven Feinartz.

In June of 2025, Maron co-starred with Owen Wilson in “Stick”, an Apple TV+ series about a former pro golfer that takes a young prodigy under his wing to turn his life around. Stick was renewed for a second season that started on November 4, 2026. https://en.wikipedia.org/wiki/Stick_(TV_series)?wprov=sfti1

=== Music ===
In 2013, Maron played a guitar solo on the protest song and charity single "Party at the NSA" by electropop music duo Yacht. Inspired by the 2013 global surveillance disclosures, "Party at the NSA" critiques the state of governmental surveillance programs in the United States. Proceeds from the single benefit the international non-profit digital rights group Electronic Frontier Foundation. Previously, Maron said he was a fan of the band.

In an interview with KCRW, Maron stated, "I have no idea why they asked me to play guitar on the track. I'm only good at one thing on the guitar. It just so happens it was exactly the thing they needed."

Reviews for the solo were positive. IFC's Melissa Locker said "Marc Maron plays a mean guitar." Spin's Chris Martins called the guitar solo a "shredfest" as well as "angular." The Stranger called it "a frequency-fraying guitar solo that's better than you'd expect, although it won't make J Mascis jealous."

Maron wrote and performed on the score for his film Sword of Trust.

== Personal life ==
Maron lived in Astoria, Queens, through the 1990s and most of the 2000s, but moved back to Los Angeles in late 2009. Maron also speaks openly of his caring for numerous stray cats that he takes into his home. This has led him to refer to his home, on the WTF podcast, as the "Cat Ranch". After his cat Boomer went missing, Maron began incorporating the catchphrase "Boomer lives!" to the end of each podcast. Since then, he has one addition to the "Cat Ranch" by the name of Buster Kitten. LaFonda died in December 2019. After she passed, Maron briefly replaced "Boomer lives!" with "LaFonda lives!" for a few episodes of his podcast. Monkey died in August 2020. He now usually concludes his podcast with some guitar playing and the phrase "Boomer lives... Monkey and LaFonda... Cat angels everywhere!" As of 2021, Maron lives in Glendale, California, with his two cats, Buster and Sammy.

Maron has spoken openly, in his act and on his podcast, about his alcohol and drug abuse during the 1990s. Maron has been sober since August 9, 1999, but says he has struggled with an eating disorder he developed during childhood. Maron had a turbulent long-time friendship with fellow standup Louis C.K.; after the November 2017 confirmation of C.K.'s sexual misconduct, Maron said C.K. had previously lied to him about the allegations.

Maron has been married twice, to Kimberly Reiss and Mishna Wolff, a former stand-up comedian. Both relationships have figured prominently in his act. During numerous appearances at the Edinburgh Fringe festival in 2007, Maron riffed on his then-recent separation and divorce from Wolff.

On the October 14, 2013, episode of his podcast, Maron announced that he had broken up with his former fiancée, Jessica Sanchez. He then had a five-month relationship with Moon Zappa.

Starting in late 2019, he began making reference to his relationship with director Lynn Shelton, a director on GLOW. She was a guest on his podcast in 2015 and 2018, and directed the 2019 film Sword of Trust, which stars Maron and Michaela Watkins. Maron and Shelton were together until Shelton's death in 2020.

As of 2023, Maron is dating a woman named Kit.

In 2025, Maron commented on the then-upcoming Riyadh Comedy Festival in Saudi Arabia on one of the final episodes of his WTF podcast, and criticized the involvement of many fellow comedians: "I mean, how do you even promote that? 'From the folks that brought you 9/11. Two weeks of laughter in the desert, don’t miss it!' I mean, the same guy that’s gonna pay them is the same guy that paid that guy to bone-saw Jamal Khashoggi and put him in a fucking suitcase. But don’t let that stop the yucks, it’s gonna be a good time!"

== Works or publications ==
Books

- Maron, Marc. The Jerusalem Syndrome: My Life As a Reluctant Messiah. New York: Broadway Books, 2001. ISBN 978-0-7679-0810-8
- Maron, Marc. Attempting Normal. New York: Spiegel & Grau, 2014. ISBN 978-0-812-98278-7
- Maron, Marc and Brendan McDonald. Waiting for the Punch: Words to Live by from the WTF Podcast. New York: Flatiron Books, 2017. ISBN 978-1-250-08888-8

Comedy albums

- Maron, Marc. Not Sold Out. [Minneapolis, MN]: Stand Up! Records, 2002.
- Maron, Marc. Tickets Still Available. [Richland, MN]: Stand Up! Records, 2006.
- Maron, Marc. Final Engagement. [Minneapolis, MN.]: Stand Up! Records, 2009.
- Maron, Marc. This Has to Be Funny. [New York City]: Comedy Central Records, 2011.
- Maron, Marc, Lance Bangs and Kathy Welch. Thinky Pain. [Burbank, CA]: New Wave Dynamics, 2013.
- Maron, Marc. Too Real. [Minneapolis, MN]: 800 Pound Gorilla Records, 2018.
- Maron, Marc. More Later. [Chicago]: 800 Pound Gorilla Records, 2020.
- Maron, Marc. From Bleak to Dark [New York City]: Craft Recordings, 2024.

Comedy specials

- HBO Comedy Half-Hour (1995) (Season 2, episode 5)
- Comedy Central Presents New York City, New York: 1998 (Season 1, episode 2)
- Comedy Central Presents (2007) (Season 11, episode 1)
- Thinky Pain (2013)
- More Later (2015)
- Too Real (2017)
- End Times Fun (2020)
- From Bleak to Dark (2023)
- Panicked (2025)

Music recordings

- Maron, Marc and Paige Stark. "Signed D.C." Love, LA. Org Music. Written by Arthur Lee. Released April 20, 2024.

Podcasts

- WTF with Marc Maron (2009–2025)

== Filmography ==
=== Film ===
Year	Title	Role	Notes
1993	Caesar's Salad	—N/a	Composer
1994	D2: The Mighty Ducks	Valet	Deleted scene
1997	Who's the Caboose?	Comedian	
1999	Los Enchiladas!	Devin	
2000	Almost Famous	Angry Promoter	
2002	Stalker Guilt Syndrome	Marc	
2008	A Bad Situationist	Mikel	
2012	Sleepwalk with Me	Marc Mulheren	
2012	G. Redford Considers	G. Redford (voice)	Short film; also producer
2012	All Wifed Out	Stan	
2015	Flock of Dudes	Richtman	
2015	Frank and Cindy	Gilbert	
2016	Get a Job	Hotel Manager	
2016	Mike and Dave Need Wedding Dates	Randy	
2019	Sword of Trust	Mel	
2019	Joker	Gene Ufland	
2020	Worth	Bart Cuthbert	
2020	Spenser Confidential	Wayne Cosgrove	
2020	Stardust	Ron Oberman	
2021	Respect	Jerry Wexler	
2022	To Leslie	Sweeney	
2022	The Bad Guys	Mr. Snake (voice)	
2022	DC League of Super-Pets	Lex Luthor (voice)	
2023	Genie	Lenny	
2024	The Order	Alan Berg	
2025	Are We Good?	Self	Documentary
2025	The Bad Guys 2	Mr. Snake (voice)	
2025	Springsteen: Deliver Me from Nowhere	Chuck Plotkin	
2026	In Memoriam	Langston Stanfield	Also producer

=== Television ===
Year	Title	Role	Notes
1993	Short Attention Span Theater	Himself (host)	
1996	Dr. Katz, Professional Therapist	Marc (voice)	2 episodes
2002	Never Mind the Buzzcocks	Himself (host)	5 episodes
2004	Pilot Season	Marc Victor	2 episodes
2010–2011	The Life & Times of Tim	Various voices	2 episodes
2012	Metalocalypse	Magnus Hammersmith (voice)	3 episodes
2012	Adventure Time	Squirrel (voice)	Episode: "Up a Tree"
2012–2014	Louie	Himself	2 episodes
2013–2016	Maron	Marc Maron	49 episodes; also creator, writer, executive producer, and directed 2 episodes
2015	Girls	Ted Duffield	2 episodes
2015–2017	Harvey Beaks	Randl (voice)	16 episodes
2016	Animals.	Marc (voice)	Episode: "Rats."
2016	Roadies	Himself	Episode: "Longest Days"
2016–2019	Easy	Jacob	3 episodes
2017–2019	GLOW	Sam Sylvia	28 episodes
2017	Penn Zero: Part-Time Hero	Piv (voice)	2 episodes
2019	The Simpsons	Himself (voice)	Episode: "The Clown Stays in the Picture"
2020	The Comedy Store	Himself	4 episodes
2022	Reservation Dogs	Gene	Episode: "Stay Gold Cheesy Boy"
2023	The Horror of Dolores Roach	Gideon Pearlman	2 episodes
2023–2025	Adventure Time: Fionna and Cake	Squirrel, additional voices (voice)	4 episodes
2025–present	Stick	Mitts	10 episodes
2026	The Terrors of Jordan Mendoza	Marc Maron Clone	Episode: "Sometimes I Feel Haunted."

=== Music videos ===
Year	Title	Artist(s)	Ref.
2012	"Sensitive Man"	Nick Lowe	
2013	"Like a Rolling Stone"	Bob Dylan	

== Accolades ==
In 2022, Maron's WTF podcast episode featuring Robin Williams from April 26, 2010, was selected by the Library of Congress for preservation in the US National Recording Registry as being "culturally, historically, or aesthetically significant."

Marc Maron award nominations
Year	Award	Category	Nominated work	Result
2018	Gold Derby Awards	Comedy Supporting Actor	GLOW	Nominated
2018	Gold Derby Awards	Ensemble of the Year	GLOW	Nominated
2018	Broadcast Film Critics Association Awards	Best Supporting Actor in a Comedy Series	GLOW	Nominated
2018	Screen Actors Guild Awards	Outstanding Performance by a Male Actor in a Comedy Series	GLOW	Nominated
2018	Screen Actors Guild Awards	Outstanding Performance by an Ensemble in a Comedy Series	GLOW	Nominated
2019	Screen Actors Guild Awards	Outstanding Performance by an Ensemble in a Comedy Series	GLOW	Nominated
2019	Gijón International Film Festival	Best Actor	Sword of Trust	Won
2021	Critics' Choice Television Awards	Best Comedy Special	End Times Fun	Nominated
2021	Inaugural Governors Award by the Podcast Academy	Excellence in Audio	WTF with Marc Maron	Won
2023	Good Grief Award from Our House Grief Support Center	Honors individuals who portray the grief process with honesty and dignity	From Bleak to Dark	Won
2024	Writers Guild Awards	Comedy/Variety Specials	From Bleak to Dark	Nominated
2026	Writers Guild Awards	Comedy/Variety Specials	Panicked	Won
