= Jim Earl =

American cartoonist

Jim Earl is a stage and radio comedian, comedy writer, musician and cartoonist from California.

Earl received a degree in Art History from the University of California, Berkeley, in 1984, and then he began his comedy career in the stand-up comedy team of "Lank and Earl" with his high-school friend Barry Lank. In 2001, he appeared in the film Pootie Tang as the character 'Eddie', directed by Louis C.K, he later became a writer for The Daily Show, winning the 2001 Emmy Award for "Outstanding Writing For A Variety, Music Or Comedy Program" and a 2000 Peabody award. After leaving the show, he wrote and performed for a number of Air America Radio's radio shows: The Randi Rhodes Show, Unfiltered with Lizz Winstead, The Rachel Maddow Radio Show, and Morning Sedition, where he performed his regular bits: "War on Brains", "Rapture Watch", "Morning Remembrance", "Sammy the Stem Cell", "Todd Brad: Policy Analyst", and "The 5 W's Plus 3 of Journalism." His comedy for the former show is now available for download on his own site, jimearl.com. Upon returning to California, Earl reunited with a former Morning Sedition host, Marc Maron, on The Marc Maron Show, which premiered on Air America Radio on February 28, 2006, and had its last show on July 14, 2006.

In December 2006, Earl went on to become head writer for the Friday ITch, a "comedy-news program for nerds", broadcast on Techweb.com. In 2007, Jim also became a staff writer for "Talkshow with Spike Feresten" on Fox TV.

Jim is currently a featured performer on both Marc Maron's podcast, WTF, and David Feldman's podcast David Feldman Show, where he regularly performs with his band, The Clutter Family. Their eponymous debut was released in April 2010.
