= Waiting for the Punch =

2017 book by Marc Maron

Waiting for the Punch: Words to Live by from the WTF Podcast
- Author: Marc Maron and Brendan McDonald
- Language: English
- Publisher: Flatiron Books
- Publication date: October 10, 2017
- Publication place: United States
- Pages: 416
- ISBN: 1-250-08888-7
- OCLC: 967867053

Waiting for the Punch: Words to Live by from the WTF Podcast is a book written by American comedian, actor and podcaster Marc Maron and published on October 10, 2017 by Flatiron Books that contains transcriptions from over 800 episodes of his interview podcast WTF with Marc Maron.

== Background ==
The 416-page book was co-written by Maron and Brendan McDonald (who produced the podcast and a former Air America colleague of Maron's) and was published on October 10, 2017 by the Macmillan Publishers imprint Flatiron Books. The book's foreword was written by British-American comedian and Last Week Tonight host John Oliver. The book contains transcriptions from over 800 interviews that Maron has done with guests on his podcast WTF with Marc Maron. Each chapter has a theme and is introduced by a short explanation about what stage of life Maron was going through at the time of the interview. The Toronto Star noted that the interviewees tend to be male comedians. Waiting for the Punch is Maron's third book following his autobiographical books Jerusalem Syndrome and Attempting Normal.

== Reception ==
The Publishers Weekly review of the book called it "deeply moving, inspirational, and witty". Barry Wightman wrote in the Washington Independent Review of Books that he hadn't heard of most of the interviewees and wading through so many disjointed transcriptions made him want "to throw the book across the room" in frustration. Canadian Broadcasting Corporation praised the book saying it is "At once laugh-out-loud funny, heartbreakingly honest, joyous, tragic and powerful". John Warner wrote in the Chicago Tribune that while the book tends to be funny it also has its awkward moments.
