= Breakroom Live with Maron & Seder =

Former weekly webcast

Breakroom Live with Maron & Seder was an hourlong webcast that aired weekdays at 3 p.m. Eastern. Marc Maron and Sam Seder hosted the show from the actual break room at Air America Media in New York; the show was evocative of past shows done by Maron and Seder on the network—political commentary interspersed with comedic elements. Unlike the other shows the two have done (The Majority Report, The Marc Maron Show), no calls were taken; however, the two did chat with viewers during and after the show via email and instant messaging.

Breakroom Live was canceled abruptly on July 15, 2009. The show's cancellation was announced on Sam Seder's and Marc Maron's Twitter accounts.
