= Kent Jones (writer) =

American radio personality (born 1964)

Thomas Kenton Jones (born June 12, 1964) is an American writer and performer on MSNBC's The Rachel Maddow Show. He is a comedy writer who also wrote and performed at Air America Radio.

== Career ==
A Missouri native, Kent moved to New York City in 1986 and held a variety of journalism jobs working at InStyle and People and contributing freelance humor articles to various publications.

=== The Daily Show ===
In 1996, he discovered the 'far more legitimate field of fake news' at The Daily Show on Comedy Central, where he was a writer for five years. Around this time, Jones was a writer on the TV special Unauthorized Biography: Milo, Death of a Supermodel.

In 2000, Kent and his fellow writers won the Emmy Award for Outstanding Writing for a Comedy, Variety or Special, as well as the Peabody Award for Excellence in Broadcasting. Kent then moved to Los Angeles and worked as a producer on shows at Oxygen and ABC.

=== Air America and The Rachel Maddow Show ===
In 2004 Kent moved back to New York to become part of the launch of Air America Radio. He wrote for Unfiltered with Lizz Winstead, Chuck D and Rachel Maddow where he delivered the "Unfiltered News". He also wrote extensively for Morning Sedition where he performed several characters including Foreign Correspondent Angus McFarquhar, Bill from Harlem and, most frequently, Planet Bush Bureau Chief Lawton Smalls. After the cancellation of Morning Sedition in December 2005, Kent continued to write and perform on The Marc Maron Show until its cancellation in July 2006. He appeared on The Rachel Maddow Show, with daily Sports and "Kent Jones Now" segments and additional co-hosting, especially during her "Ask Dr. Maddow" and "Pet Story" segments. The Lawton Smalls character made "calls" to The Sam Seder Show and was on the November 7, 2006 live webcam election coverage with Rachel Maddow. Jones left Air America on Friday, December 14, 2007, as a result of a "business decision" by the management.

Jones became a regular contributor to The Rachel Maddow Show on MSNBC in September 2008. His regular segment "Just Enough" aired for several years during the last few minutes of the show and focused on pop culture news, before being quietly dropped. He now serves as a producer for the show, appearing occasionally on air as correspondent and in other segments. He also contributes humor pieces to the show's blog, The Maddowblog.

The show and its entire staff won an Emmy award in 2011 for Outstanding news and discussion analysis.
