= Mark Riley (American radio host) =

American journalist and commentator (born 1951)

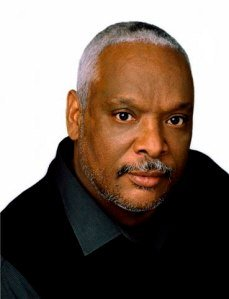
- Born: September 22, 1951 (age 74)
- Occupations: Journalist, commentator, radio personality
- Website: markrileymedia.com

Mark Riley (born September 22, 1951) is an American journalist and commentator. He is the former host/presenter of WWRL 1600 AM's morning drive talk program. He hosted a four-hour evening news, interview, comment, and culture program, "The Air Americans," on the now-defunct liberal talk radio network Air America Radio. His work at Air America also included co-hosting the network's morning-drive show, "Morning Sedition" with stand-up comic Marc Maron.

Riley was also employed by WLIB 1190AM in New York City, where he worked as a broadcast journalist, program director and air personality. He has also worked with Richard Bey co-hosting the morning drive program at WWRL 1600AM New York.

== Career ==
Riley’s first radio opportunity was as host of the public affairs program Urban Notebook, which skyrocketed in popularity throughout the New York tri-state area. In 1986, Riley moved to the prime time morning slot and broadcast live from the famous Apollo Theater in Harlem. Since that time, Riley has worked his way up through a spectrum of roles including writer, editor, managing editor, executive editor, and program director.

During his 1992-1996 tenure as program director of New York's WLIB (1190 AM), Riley identified the diversity of the WLIB audience and set out to establish more balance between the African American and Caribbean dimensions of the station's programming. Riley also pioneered the station's efforts to enhance listener awareness in the political arena, airing full coverage of all Democratic and Republican conventions since 1990, as well as coverage of both Democratic Inaugurals in Haiti.

In March 2004, Air America Radio began broadcasting from New York, with WLIB as its flagship station. Riley was one of the few holdovers from the WLIB staff, and co-hosted the morning drive program Morning Sedition. In December 2005, he began hosting The Mark Riley Show (also on Air America), a two-hour morning news program. This show ended on May 11, 2007, so that Riley and his producers could prepare for the launch of The Air Americans. After the cancellation of the show, Riley and Richard Bey became cohosts at WWRL's morning show.

On October 3, 2009, Riley launched Working New York, a weekly radio program airing Saturdays on WWRL.

In addition to radio presenting, Riley is a TV political analyst with frequent appearances on The Road to City Hall on New York 1 News.

Riley has also appeared as a commentator on BET, CNN, The Charles Grodin Show, CNN’s Reporters Roundtable, the Fox News Channel’s Hannity & Colmes, The CBS Early Show, and MSNBC. International credits include work as a frequent contributor for BBC Radio and a documentary producer for the BBC2 in London.TV Credits (Political Pundit): The Lou Dobbs Show/CNN * WCBS Mornings * The Fox News Channel * New York 1 News * BBC Radio London * BBC Up All Night * BBC Live at Five * Channel 4 UK * The Tavis Smiley Show/BET * Both Sides with Jesse Jackson * The Charles Grodin Show * Caribbean Lifestyles TV

Mark Riley is a co-Founder of For The Record (1978), the successor of The New York Record Pool. From this capacity he has built extensive accolades as a Club Music aficionado and is often aligned with some of the most iconic names in the history of Club/Dance Music globally: The Loft, The Garage, David Mancuso, Larry Levan, Frankie Knuckles, David Morales, Joey Llanos.

== Education ==
Riley studied English at New York University and is also a graduate of The Gunnery School in Connecticut.
