= I'm Down (book) =

Memoir by Mishna Wolff

- Author: Mishna Wolff
- Audio read by: Mishna Wolff
- Language: English
- Published: 2009
- Publisher: St. Martin's Press
- Publication place: United States
- Media type: Print, ebook, audiobook
- Pages: 288 pages
- ISBN: 0312378556 First edition, hardback

I'm Down is a memoir by the American author Mishna Wolff, originally published by St. Martin's Press in 2009. In the book, she relates her experience of being white while growing up in a predominantly African-American neighborhood and having a different financial situation and culture than the other white children at her gifted student public school program filled with mostly white kids.

== Plot summary ==
Mishna Wolff is a little girl growing up in two households of divorced parents with two very different personalities and cultures. Her father lives in Rainier Valley, Seattle. Rainier Valley is a predominantly black and minority neighborhood and Mishna has a difficult time making friends, primarily because she is white. So are her father and mother. Her father, however, grew up with black friends in a black neighborhood and basically grew up black. His only friends were black and if you asked, he would probably tell you he was black. He wanted his children to act black. This set up Mishna for an interesting childhood as she watched Anora, her sister, make more friends with people on their street than Mishna could understand.

She fights for acceptance in her neighborhood as she is perceived as "too white" while she struggles with acceptance (and accepting others) in her prestigious school. Mishna has trouble dealing with bullying from her peers, meeting the expectations her father sets for her (no matter how unusual they seem), the pressure she puts on herself, and learning who she is while society is pushing and pulling her into what they want her to be. She competes with the children in her neighborhood to be the funniest, the meanest, and the toughest while she strives to be rich, successful, and seemingly carefree like her school friends. When she returns home to her father and his many girlfriends and potential wives, she suppresses her school side to impress her father, while at her mom's house and at school she suppresses her neighborhood life to appeal to her mother.

== Release ==
I'm Down was first published in hardback in the United States on May 26, 2009 through St. Martin's Press.

== Reception ==
Entertainment Weekly and the Seattle Times both praised I'm Down, with the Seattle Times writing that "The book stops being a comedy about halfway in. After that, it’s still funny — Wolff, like Chris Rock, has a way with presenting brutal truths — but there’s too much real life, and too little reconciliation between Mishna and her dad for “I’m Down” to fit neatly into any bookstore’s “humor” section."
