= David Williams (natural history writer) =

American writer

David B. Williams
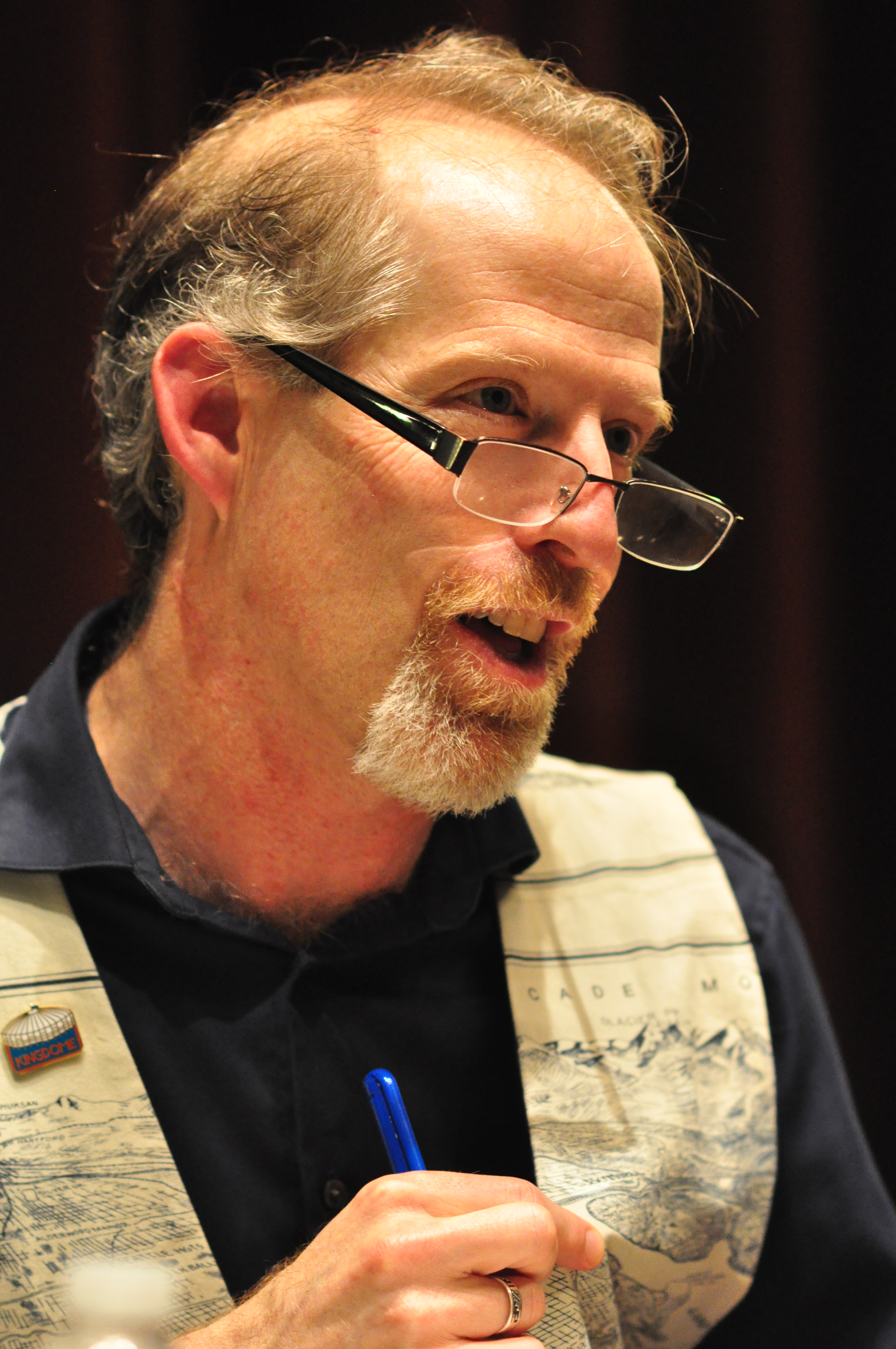
- Williams in 2015
- Education: B.A. geology
- Alma mater: Colorado College
- Occupation: Freelance writer
- Writing career
- Language: English
- Genre: Natural history
- Notable work: Stories in Stone
- Notable awards: Washington State Book Award finalist (2010); Northwest Writers Fund grant (2014)

David B. Williams is an American freelance writer in Seattle.

== Biography ==
Originally raised in Seattle, David B. Williams attended college in Colorado, where he initially studied physics but switched to geology. He received a Bachelor of Arts in geology from Colorado College and worked as a park ranger at Arches National Park in Utah.

Williams returned to Seattle to be a writer of natural history books and occasional urban geology tour guide. He was employed at Seattle's Burke Museum as of 2014. He writes a biweekly newsletter, Street Smart Naturalist: Notes on People, Place, and the PNW. One local bookseller wrote, "When it comes to books about Seattle and its surroundings, there's one must-read writer as far as I'm concerned, and that's David B. Williams."

Williams' interest in urban geology was sparked by the use of stone in the Downtown Seattle Transit Tunnel.

== Bibliography ==
- David B. Williams; Stanley L. Welsh (1990). Grand Views of Canyon Country: A Driving Guide (third ed.). Canyonlands Natural History Association. ISBN 9780937407004.
- David B. Williams; Damian Fagan (1994). A Naturalist's Guide to the White Rim Trail. Wingate Ink. ISBN 9780964417304.
- David B. Williams (2000). A Naturalist's Guide to Canyon Country. Globe Pequot. ISBN 9781560447832.
- David B. Williams (2000). The Seattle Street-Smart Naturalist: Field Notes from the City. Westwinds Press. ISBN 9781558688599. alternate title The Street-Smart Naturalist: Field Notes from Seattle
- David B. Williams (2009). Stories in Stone. Walker Books. ISBN 9780802716224. (Washington State Book Award finalist)
- David B. Williams (2012). Cairns: Messengers in Stone. The Mountaineers Books. ISBN 978-1-59485-681-5.
- David B. Williams (2015). Too High and Too Steep: Reshaping Seattle's Topography. University of Washington Press. ISBN 978-0295995045. (funded by University of Washington Press Northwest Writers Fund grant)
- Williams, David B. (2017). Seattle Walks: Discovering History and Nature in the City. University of Washington Press. ISBN 978-0295741284. OCLC 963736198.
- Williams, David B. (2021). Homewaters: A Human and Natural History of Puget Sound. University of Washington Press. ISBN 9780295748603.
- Williams, David B. (2025). Wild in Seattle: Stories at the Crossroads of People and Nature. Illustrated by Elizabeth Person. Mountaineers Books. ISBN 9781680517651.
- Williams, David B.; Ott, Jennifer (2026). Seattle's Locks and Ship Canal: A History and Guide. University of Washington Press copublished with HistoryLink. ISBN 9780295754949. (March 2026)
