= Mishna Wolff =

American humorist

- Born: United States
- Occupations: Writer, humorist, screenwriter, memoirist
- Spouse(s): Marc Maron (divorced); Jeremy Doner
- Children: 2
- Writing career
- Language: English
- Genres: Comedy, screenwriting, non-fiction
- Website: mishnawolff.com

Mishna Wolff is an American writer, humorist, and screenwriter best known for her 2009 memoir I'm Down, which chronicles her experience growing up white in a predominantly African-American Seattle neighborhood and has become widely taught in U.S. schools.

== Early life ==
Wolff grew up in Seattle, Washington. She claims that when her parents divorced, her father expected her to integrate into the black community the way he had. She later wrote about these experiences in her memoir, I'm Down.

== Career ==
After having a humorous piece published in BlackBook Magazine, Wolff began performing on stage at Luna Lounge and the Upright Citizens Brigade. There she honed her comedic skills and performed personal essays in the LA storytelling series "Sit 'n Spin". She has been featured on VH1, Comedy Central, Air America and NPR. Her one-person show I'm Down was the basis of her memoir of the same name. Mishna Wolff was one of the 2009 Sundance Screenwriting Lab Fellows.

Wolff wrote the screenplay for the 2021 comedy horror film Werewolves Within.

=== I'm Down ===
Wolff's I'm Down: A Memoir was published by St. Martin's Press in 2009 and was a national best seller.

In 2011, KCBD of Lubbock, Texas, ran a story about I'm Down's being littered with profanity and inappropriate for Lubbock County English students. The book was removed from classrooms pending formal school district review. The school board voted unanimously to continue teaching it. One of the principals even assigned it to all his administrators.

I'm Down was chosen as Florida International University's Common Reader 2012–2013, and the Common Reader for Colorado Mountain College for 2013-2014. Wolff was a guest speaker at both colleges.

She received a Sundance-Indian Paintbrush screenwriting fellowship in 2012.

== Personal life ==
Wolff was married to comic Marc Maron, and their divorce was the subject of his one-man show Scorching the Earth. The marriage was a frequent topic in his stand-up, podcasts, and one-man shows. Maron characterized his own behavior during their marriage as emotionally abusive.

She later married screenwriter Jeremy Doner; the couple have two children.
