= Morning Sedition =

American radio program

- Genre: Politics, interviews, comedy
- Running time: 3 hours
- Country of origin: United States
- Language: English
- Home station: Air America Radio
- Hosted by: Marc Maron; Mark Riley; Sue Ellicott
- Original release: April 1, 2004 – December 16, 2005

Morning Sedition was an American three-hour radio program that premiered April 1, 2004 and ran until December 16, 2005.

It was hosted by comedian Marc Maron and New York radio veteran Mark Riley. Prior to June 2004, the show was also hosted by radio and television journalist Sue Ellicott. The show combined live interview, call-in and commentary with a liberal slant. The name is a parody of the popular NPR program Morning Edition.

The show aired from 6:00 to 9:00 am Eastern Time from Monday to Friday, with a "Best of Morning Sedition" on Saturdays from 6:00 to 10:00 am Eastern Time on Air America Radio (AAR). It was available via Internet streaming through Windows Media Player or the RealPlayer. The show was also available in MP3 podcast format for use with iTunes and the iPod.

Co-hosts Marc Maron and Mark Riley (a.k.a. Marc and Mark), mixed a fast paced dialogue with discussion and interviews. With Mark Riley playing straight man to Marc Maron, serious political issues were framed by comedy.

Rachel Maddow and Wayne Gilman split news reader chairs at the top of the hour. The show was produced by current Doing Time with Ron Kuby producer Dan Pashman.

== Recurring sketches ==
Morning Sedition featured daily comedic skits by former Daily Show writers.

- "INews 5000 WiFi Headline Translator", Marc cranked up this high tech gizmo daily. It translates headlines to get to the truth behind the headlines.
- "Recovery Corner", which was an "advice" column to "recovering alcoholic George W. Bush." (This routine was retired in advance of the show's cancellation.)
- "Liberal Confessional", in which callers sought atonement from the hosts for transgressions they've committed against the liberal philosophy.
- "Palm Pilot", which was the official schedule of Washington politicos that a page, Ramon, brought in. (This routine was retired in advance of the show's cancellation.)
- "Marc's Dream Diary" in which Maron detailed the haunting, sometimes surreal dreams he has, all usually involving right-wing reactionaries lurking in his slumber.
- "Marc, the Shark" in which a call-in from right winger "Ted from Nebraska" triggered Marc's Jekyll and Hyde transformation into gravelly-voiced Marc, "the Shark" Maron on a radio show entitled "Right-and-Early" from Radio Halliburton. It included his famous opening "Good Morning Neo-cons!"
- "Planet Bush correspondent Lawton Smalls." Occasionally Marc would call 'Lawton Smalls' - the 'Planet Bush Correspondent.' (played by Kent Jones) Typically Marc Maron introduced premises to Lawton, and then Lawton responded with an extreme right-wing Christian response. Lawton would then break down into tears after several premises, and he appeared to accept what Marc Maron had said. However, after a bout of strong coughing, Lawton would return to his original explanations.
- "Morning Sedition Radio Theater", Marc Maron battled the forces of evil in each action-adventure radio play the show held. Performances included "The Shadow Government" and "Marc Maron and the Temple of Doom". Both series were written by staff writers Barry Lank and Mike Ferrucci.
- "The Liberal Agenda", as a parody, it was a list of daily liberal marching orders from "The Streisand Compound."
- "Morning Edition CliffsNotes", a wry recap of the news and guest interviews from earlier in the show.
- "Rapture Watch", where 'Milf Cardinal Milfington' (staff writer Jim Earl), with florid pseudo-religious gobbledegook (including tongues), cited actual events that portend the End of Days.
- "Weekly Remembrance", where 'Mort Mortenson' (staff writer Jim Earl) tearfully (although he claimed he had allergies, and was NOT crying) presented wry obituaries for the recently deceased.
- "War on Brains", where 'Mort Milfington' (staff writer Jim Earl) methodically dissected anti-environmental, anti-science, and anti-education trends of the Bush administration.
- "Sammy the Stem Cell", played by Jim Earl in a squeaky voice, was occasionally brought into the studio to clear up the issue of stem cell research, but proceeded to berate everything in sight. He ordinarily excused his behavior with the claim that he was sacred life.
- "Future Marc". Marc Maron from the far future regularly phoned in with sage advice for Marc. Says Marc, "I love that guy!"
- "Angus McFahrquar" (Kent Jones) traveled the world to report from forefront civil disruptions. Unfortunately, Angus had a tendency to get carried away with things, often contributing to and even inciting the violence.
- "Johnny K-Street", Morning Sedition's very own odds maker, often dropped in to give everybody the morning line on things political. Played by comedy writer Mike Ferrucci, with the verve of someone who writes lines for Triumph the Insult Comic Dog.
- "Pendejo, the Revolutionary". A routine sadly retired from the show (in retrospect, an early retirement since everything else since has been a forced retirement). Played by comedy writer Tom Johnson.
- "The Stalker". An anonymous annoying guy (writer Tom Johnson) in desperate need of attention.
- "Todd Brad", Morning Sedition's Bush policy analyst, with a particular scorn (and appetite!) for babies. Played by Jim Earl. Who else? "Is there a baby in here?"
- "Bruce Cherry's Pitch of the Week", The earnest staff-writer without a recurring character to play. He relentlessly pitched his ideas weekly, never gaining a foothold with any of them. Played by staff writer "Bruce Cherry".
- "Slander Minute", The incompetent investigative journalist "Ted Fields" lies, distorts, and libels everything he touches, thereby performing admirably compared to 99% of the mainstream media. Played by staff writer Barry Lank.
- "Iraq, Birth of a Nation", Marc Maron would address Iraq as a whole, offering his advice to the fledgling nation only to be answered by expressive gunfire.
- "Al Jazeera's Morning Zoo", Two dudes from the Al Jazeera network do the morning zoo routine. Played by Mike Ferucci and Barry Lank.
- Polluck, the conspiracy guy, played by Bruce Cherry.

== Cancellation ==
On Monday, November 28, 2005, Marc Maron announced that Morning Sedition would last air on December 16. There was a great outpouring from Morning Sedition fans, including thousands of e-mails to AAR CEO Danny Goldberg, other AAR hosts, and AAR board members. Additionally, over 6,300 fans signed an online petition calling for the renewal of Maron's contract and the Morning Sedition program.

Nevertheless, Morning Sedition was replaced with a four-hour program, Air America Mornings, with Riley hosting the first two hours (5–7 am) and Maddow hosting the second two hours (7–9 am), in an effort to bolster Air America's ratings for its morning programming. Maron had a new show, The Marc Maron Show, that debuted February 28, 2006. The show was broadcast from Burbank, California, on KTLK, Progressive Talk 1150 AM. Its time slot was 10:00 am – 12:00 noon, Pacific Standard Time, and the show included several sketches that had previously appeared on Morning Sedition.
