= WTF with Marc Maron =

American comedy podcast

- Podcast artwork
- Genre: Comedy; Interview
- Country of origin: United States
- Language: American English

Cast and voices
- Hosted by: Marc Maron

Production
- Production: Brendan McDonald
- Length: 60–120 minutes

Technical specifications
- Audio format: MP3

Publication
- No. of episodes: 1,686
- Original release: September 1, 2009 – October 13, 2025
- Provider: Acast
- Updates: Semiweekly: Mon. & Thurs.

Reception
- Ratings: 4.19/5

Related
- Website: www.wtfpod.com

WTF with Marc Maron is a podcast and syndicated radio show that was hosted by the American stand-up comedian and actor Marc Maron. It was launched on September 1, 2009 and ended on October 13, 2025 after 1,686 episodes, and aired weekly on Mondays and Thursdays. The show was produced by Maron's former Air America colleague Brendan McDonald.

== Background ==
The show's title stems from the slang abbreviation WTF (for "What the fuck?"). WTF launched in September 2009 following the cancellation of Maron's Air America terrestrial radio program Breakroom Live with Maron & Seder. Maron retained his Air America building keycard and, without permission, used their studios to record the first several episodes of WTF.

After the first episodes, Maron moved from New York to the San Francisco Bay area in California. Most episodes were generally recorded in Maron's home garage, nicknamed "the Cat Ranch", in Los Angeles. He ended most podcasts with the phrase "Boomer lives" in honor of a cat he brought from New York who went missing. The phrase became a hashtag and his production company name.

Occasionally shows were recorded in Maron's various hotel rooms (while on the road performing stand-up), the offices of his guests, or other locations. Every show opened with an audio sample of one of Maron's lines from the film Almost Famous: "Lock the gates!"

WTF began being distributed to radio by Public Radio Exchange in 2012. On the episode released on June 2, 2025, Maron announced that WTF would end later that year. Maron interviewed Barack Obama again for the final episode, released on October 13, 2025.

== Reception ==
WTF has received generally positive reviews, including positive write-ups in The New York Times and Entertainment Weekly. On average, it receives over 443,000 downloads per episode, with the show purportedly surpassing 600 million downloads by July 2022. In 2014, Rolling Stone listed WTF #1 on their list of The 20 Best Comedy Podcasts Right Now. In 2022, the episode featuring Robin Williams from April 26, 2010, was selected by the Library of Congress for preservation in the United States National Recording Registry as being "culturally, historically, or aesthetically significant," becoming the first recording from the 2010s to be inducted.

=== Awards ===
| Year | Award | Category | Result | Ref. |
|---|---|---|---|---|
| 2015 | Academy of Podcasters | Best Comedy Podcast | Finalist | |
| 2016 | Academy of Podcasters | Best Comedy Podcast | Won | |
| 2017 | Academy of Podcasters | Best Comedy Podcast | Finalist | |
| 2019 | iHeartRadio Podcast Awards | Best Comedy Podcast | Nominated | |
| 2021 | Ambies | Governors' Award | Won | |

== Notable podcasts ==
Episode 67: Robin Williams (April 26, 2010),
Remembering Robin Williams (August 11, 2014):
Williams discusses contemplating suicide. In response to the news of Williams' death on August 11, 2014, Maron reposted the original conversation later that day—complete with new host segments describing how much the episode had shaped the entire show and impacted his own personal life. In 2022, this episode was inducted into the National Recording Registry by the Library of Congress.
Episode 75: Carlos Mencia (May 24, 2010),
Episode 76: Willie Barcena / Steve Treviño / Carlos responds (May 27, 2010):
Mencia discusses the accusations of plagiarism that had been following him since a 2005 post by Joe Rogan. After the recording session, Maron thought that "something didn't feel right," and the very next episode began with interviews with comedians Willie Barcena and Steve Treviño, who both offered accounts of Mencia stealing material. Maron contacted Mencia for a rebuttal prior to its release and he immediately returned for a reprise which aired as the last segment of that episode. In it, he admits to "having an agenda" when recording the initial interview, and discusses the allegations and his reputation in a much less guarded and more forthright manner.
Episode 111: Louis CK part 1 (October 4, 2010),
Episode 112: Louis CK part 2 (October 7, 2010):
A two-episode interview during which Louis C.K. and Maron publicly reveal that they previously had a falling out, then discuss and eventually rekindle their old friendship. During the podcast, C.K. became audibly emotional when talking about the birth of his first daughter. Slate called the interview the greatest podcast episode of all time in a 2014 list.
Episode 141: Kevin Smith (January 17, 2011):
Smith details his acrimonious working relationship with Bruce Willis on the set of his film Cop Out, which triggered a public feud between the two of them.
Episode 145: Gallagher (January 31, 2011):
Gallagher walks out mid-interview after Maron broaches the subject of the recent accusations of Gallagher's material as being racist and homophobic, which sparked a heated argument.
Episode 190: Todd Hanson (July 7, 2011):
Hanson gives a detailed account of his suicide attempt in a Brooklyn hotel room and speaks about his lifelong struggle with depression.
Episode 245: Todd Glass (January 16, 2012):
Glass comes out publicly for the first time as gay.
Episode 477: Kevin Macdonald / Kevin McDonald (March 10, 2014):
When Maron's assistant gauges his interest in interviewing "Kevin McDonald" for an upcoming episode, Maron, an avowed fan of The Kids In The Hall comedy troupe quickly gives his assent. However on the day of the interview, Maron is greeted by a publicist who informs him that her client is participating primarily to promote his movie. Though surprised, he thinks little of it, as he rarely researches or prepares extensively before interviews. His surprise is justified when the interviewee that arrives a short time later is not the Canadian comedian he'd expected, but instead a Scottish film director he'd never heard of: Kevin Macdonald.

Since the director had arrived early, Maron excused himself to research and prepare in private and therein learned that the man's filmography included The Last King of Scotland, which he had seen, and another he'd heard of, Being Mick, and set about using what he'd learned as a starting point for the conversation.The resulting interview was shorter than a typical episode, however, and did not air immediately. Later, while performing in Los Angeles, Maron had a chance encounter with Kevin McDonald and personally invited him to interview, proposing that it serve as a second segment of the same episode. McDonald agreed, noting that he had never met the director but they were both represented by William Morris Agency, and this was not their first mix up (the Internal Revenue Service had previously made the same mistake).
Episode 613: President Barack Obama (June 22, 2015):
Obama records an episode in Maron's garage after the Charleston church shooting, receiving extra attention due to Obama's use of the word "nigger" when discussing racism in America.
Episode 653: Lorne Michaels (November 9, 2015):
The two-hour interview with the creator of Saturday Night Live had added significance owing to Maron's frequent references throughout the podcast to SNL and its creators, along with the impact of his own rejection from being hired for SNL in the mid-1990s.
Remembering Jerry Lewis (August 20, 2017):
A previously unreleased recording of an interview with Jerry Lewis from the prior August that had been planned as a full episode. When Lewis abruptly ended the show without explanation after less than a half-hour had elapsed, Maron opted not to release any of it to spare the elderly comic any humiliation. After Lewis' death was announced on August 20, 2017, the full recording was released as a special episode of the podcast later that day.
Episode 849: Pete Davidson (September 25, 2017):
Saturday Night Live cast member Pete Davidson publicly acknowledges his diagnosis and treatment for borderline personality disorder for the first time.
Episode 995: Mandy Moore (February 18, 2019):
Actress and singer Mandy Moore admits that her marriage to musician Ryan Adams that ended in divorce in 2015 had an "entirely unhealthy dynamic" and subjected her to frequent emotional abuse.
Episode 1,091: Josh Klinghoffer (January 23, 2020):
In his first public interview since leaving the Red Hot Chili Peppers, former lead guitarist Josh Klinghoffer discusses the circumstances surrounding his abrupt ouster after a dozen years as part of the popular rock band.
Episode 1,299: Peter Dinklage (January 24, 2022):
Dinklage's appearance attracted media attention as a result of his criticism of Disney's then-upcoming remake of Snow White, commenting on the "backwards" depiction of the Seven Dwarfs and accusing them of hypocrisy in using the film to promote progressive values.
Episode 1,686: Barack Obama (October 13, 2025):
In the last episode, Obama returned to the program, this time recorded at Washington, D.C. Over the course of an hour-long interview, the two spoke about the state of the world and how to stay optimistic amid political strife and chaos.
